= Ron Anderson =

Ron Anderson may refer to:

== Sportspeople ==
- Ron Anderson (basketball, born 1958), American NBA player
- Ron Anderson (basketball, born 1989), American basketball player and son of the above
- Ron Anderson (ice hockey, born 1945), NHL player (Detroit, LA, St. Louis, Buffalo) and WHA player (Edmonton) born in Alberta
- Ron Anderson (ice hockey, born 1948), WHA player (Chicago, Cleveland) born in Ontario
- Ron Anderson (ice hockey, born 1950), NHL player (Washington Capitals) born in New Brunswick
- Ron Anderson (sailor), American competitor in events such as the Star World Championship
- Ronnie Anderson (footballer) (1922-1984), English footballer, see List of Bury F.C. players (1–24 appearances)

== Others ==
- Ronald K. Anderson (1934–2023), American trumpeter and teacher
- Ronald Anderson (1941–2020), American sociologist
- Ron Anderson (singer) (born 1945), American singer
- Ron Anderson (voice coach) (1946–2021), American voice coach
- Ron Anderson (musician) (born 1959), American musician, composer, frequent collaborator with Tatsuya Yoshida
- Ron Anderson (The Walking Dead), a character from The Walking Dead (TV series)

== See also ==
- Ron Andersen (1941–1997), American bridge player
- Ronnie Anderson (born 1974), American NFL wide receiver
