= 1985–86 Milwaukee Bucks season =

NBA professional basketball team season

- Division champions
- Head coach: Don Nelson
- General manager: Don Nelson
- Owner: Herb Kohl
- Arena: MECCA Arena

Results
- Record: 57–25 (.695)
- Place: Division: 1st (Central); Conference: 2nd (Eastern)
- Playoff finish: Conference finals (lost to Celtics 0–4)
- Stats at Basketball Reference

Local media
- Television: WVTV
- Radio: WTMJ

The 1985–86 Milwaukee Bucks season was the 18th season for the Bucks. Prior to the season, the Bucks dropped red from their color scheme; they would keep their uniform (which depicts multiple shades of green on the side) until the 1992-93 season. Milwaukee posted a 57–25 record but lost to the Boston Celtics in the Eastern Conference finals.

== Draft picks ==
Round	Pick	Player	Position	Nationality	School/Club team
1	22	Jerry Reynolds	SG/SF	United States	Louisiana State
3	68	Eugene McDowell	PF/C	United States	Florida
4	91	Cozell McQueen	F	United States	North Carolina State
5	114	Ray Knight		United States	Providence
6	137	Quentin Anderson		United States	Texas Tech
7	160	Mario Elie	SG/SF	United States	American International

== Roster ==
1985–86 Milwaukee Bucks roster
Players

Pos.	No.	Player	Height	Weight	DOB	From
C	45	Randy Breuer	7 ft 3 in (2.21 m)	230 lb (104 kg)	1960–10–11	Minnesota
PF	34	Terry Cummings	6 ft 9 in (2.06 m)	220 lb (100 kg)	1961–03–15	DePaul
SF	23	Charles Davis	6 ft 7 in (2.01 m)	215 lb (98 kg)	1958–10–05	Vanderbilt
SF	54	Kenny Fields	6 ft 5 in (1.96 m)	220 lb (100 kg)	1962–02–09	UCLA
PG	10	Mike Glenn	6 ft 2 in (1.88 m)	175 lb (79 kg)	1955–09–10	Southern Illinois
SG	15	Craig Hodges	6 ft 2 in (1.88 m)	190 lb (86 kg)	1960–06–27	Long Beach State
C	53	Alton Lister	7 ft 0 in (2.13 m)	240 lb (109 kg)	1958–10–01	Arizona State
C	44	Paul Mokeski	7 ft 0 in (2.13 m)	250 lb (113 kg)	1957–01–03	Kansas
PG	4	Sidney Moncrief	6 ft 3 in (1.91 m)	180 lb (82 kg)	1957–09–21	Arkansas
SG	22	Ricky Pierce	6 ft 4 in (1.93 m)	205 lb (93 kg)	1959–08–19	Rice
SF	25	Paul Pressey	6 ft 5 in (1.96 m)	185 lb (84 kg)	1958–12–24	Tulsa
G/F	35	Jerry Reynolds	6 ft 8 in (2.03 m)	200 lb (91 kg)	1962–12–23	LSU

Coaches
Head coach
- Don Nelson
Assistant(s)
- Mike Schuler
- Garry St. Jean

Legend
- (DP) Unsigned draft pick
- (FA) Free agent
- (S) Suspended
- Injured

== Regular season ==
=== Season standings ===
Central Division	W	L	PCT	GB	Home	Road	Div
y-Milwaukee Bucks	57	25	.695	–	33–8	24–17	21–9
x-Atlanta Hawks	50	32	.610	7	34–7	16–25	21–9
x-Detroit Pistons	46	36	.561	11	31–10	15–26	18–12
x-Chicago Bulls	30	52	.366	27	22–19	8–33	10–20
Cleveland Cavaliers	29	53	.354	28	16–25	13–28	10–19
Indiana Pacers	26	56	.317	31	19–22	7–34	9–20

#	Eastern Conference				
#	Team	W	L	PCT	GB
1	z-Boston Celtics	67	15	.817	–
2	y-Milwaukee Bucks	57	25	.695	10
3	x-Philadelphia 76ers	54	28	.659	13
4	x-Atlanta Hawks	50	32	.610	17
5	x-Detroit Pistons	46	36	.561	21
6	x-Washington Bullets	39	43	.476	28
7	x-New Jersey Nets	39	43	.476	28
8	x-Chicago Bulls	30	52	.366	37
9	Cleveland Cavaliers	29	53	.354	38
10	Indiana Pacers	26	56	.317	41
11	New York Knicks	23	59	.280	44

z – clinched division title
y – clinched division title
x – clinched playoff spot

=== Game log ===
1985–86 game log
Total: 57–25 (home: 33–8; road: 24–17)
October: 2–2 (home: 2–0; road: 0–2)

Game	Date	Team	Score	High points	High rebounds	High assists	Location Attendance	Record
1	October 25, 1985	@ Detroit	L 116–118				Pontiac Silverdome	0–1
2	October 26, 1985; 8:00 p.m. CDT	Atlanta	W 117–91	Moncrief (20)	Breuer (7)	Pressey (7)	MECCA Arena; 10,237	1–1
3	October 29, 1985	Philadelphia	W 119–117				MECCA Arena	2–1
4	October 30; 6:30 p.m. CST	@ Boston	L 106–117	Pierce (26)	Cummings (12)	Pressey(6)	Boston Garden; 14,890	2–2

November: 13–4 (home: 6–0; road: 7–4)

Game	Date	Team	Score	High points	High rebounds	High assists	Location Attendance	Record
5	November 2, 1985	New Jersey	W 136–113				MECCA Arena	3–2
6	November 3, 1985	@ Cleveland	W 120–110				Richfield Coliseum	4–2
7	November 5, 1985	San Antonio	W 126–97				MECCA Arena	5–2
8	November 7, 1985	@ New York	W 92–88				Madison Square Garden	6–2
9	November 9, 1985	@ New Jersey	L 123–126				Brendan Byrne Arena	6–3
10	November 10, 1985	@ Philadelphia	L 97–105				The Spectrum	6–4
11	November 12, 1985	@ Chicago	W 132–103				Chicago Stadium	7–4
12	November 13, 1985	Detroit	W 137–118				MECCA Arena	8–4
13	November 15, 1985	Chicago	W 118–103				MECCA Arena	9–4
14	November 17, 1985	@ Portland	W 117–104				Memorial Coliseum	10–4
15	November 20, 1985	@ Seattle	W 116–106				Seattle Center Coliseum	11–4
16	November 21, 1985	@ Sacramento	W 131–97				ARCO Arena	12–4
17	November 23, 1985	@ L.A. Clippers	L 112–116				Los Angeles Memorial Sports Arena	12–5
18	November 24, 1985	@ Phoenix	W 140–138 (OT)				Arizona Veterans Memorial Coliseum	13–5
19	November 27, 1985; 7:30 p.m. CST	Atlanta	W 114–96	Cummings (19)	Cummings (9)	Pressey (8)	MECCA Arena; 10,879	14–5
20	November 29, 1985	@ Detroit	L 102–111				Pontiac Silverdome	14–6
21	November 30, 1985	Indiana	W 111–94				MECCA Arena	15–6

December: 8–6 (home: 6–3; road: 2–3)

Game	Date	Team	Score	High points	High rebounds	High assists	Location Attendance	Record
22	December 3; 7:30 p.m. CST	Boston	L 109–112	Pressey (28)	Breuer (10)	Pressey (10)	MECCA Arena; 11,052	15–7
23	December 5, 1985	@ New York	W 105–95				Madison Square Garden	16–7
24	December 6, 1985; 6:30 p.m. CST	@ Atlanta	L 93–94	Moncrief (23)	Cummings (13)	Hodges, Pressey (4)	The Omni; 5,562	16–8
25	December 10, 1985	Seattle	W 117–98				MECCA Arena	17–8
26	December 12, 1985	@ Washington	L 108–110 (OT)				Capital Centre	17–9
27	December 13, 1985	Cleveland	L 124–128				MECCA Arena	17–10
28	December 15, 1985	Sacramento	W 140–82				MECCA Arena	18–10
29	December 18; 7:30 p.m. CST	L.A. Lakers	L 105–107	Cummings (23)	Cummings, Moncrief (10)	Moncrief (11)	MECCA Arena; 11,052	18–11
30	December 20, 1985	@ Indiana	L 102–114				Market Square Arena	19–11
31	December 21, 1985	Dallas	W 132–107				MECCA Arena	19–12
32	December 26, 1985	Indiana	W 105–87				MECCA Arena	20–12
33	December 28, 1985	@ Cleveland	W 114–112 (OT)				Richfield Coliseum	21–12
34	December 30, 1985	Detroit	W 121–110				MECCA Arena	22–12

January: 10–4 (home: 5–1; road: 5–3)

Game	Date	Team	Score	High points	High rebounds	High assists	Location Attendance	Record
35	January 3, 1986	@ Washington	W 107–100				Capital Centre	23–12
36	January 4, 1986	New York	W 119–86				MECCA Arena	23–13
37	January 7, 1986	Cleveland	W 110–101				MECCA Arena	24–13
38	January 8, 1986	@ New Jersey	L 99–106				Brendan Byrne Arena	25–13
39	January 10, 1986	Portland	W 95–89				MECCA Arena	26–13
40	January 13, 1986	Denver	L 115–119				MECCA Arena	26–14
41	January 16, 1986	Washington	W 114–98				MECCA Arena	27–14
42	January 19, 1986	Golden State	W 122–109				MECCA Arena	28–14
43	January 20, 1986; 6:30 p.m. CST	@ Atlanta	L 98–101	Moncrief, Pressey (23)	Breuer (14)	Moncrief (7)	The Omni; 9,467	28–15
44	January 24, 1986	@ Indiana	W 117–92				Market Square Arena	29–15
45	January 25, 1986	@ New York	W 104–88				Madison Square Garden	30–15
46	January 27, 1986	@ Utah	W 127–103				Salt Palace Acord Arena	31–15
47	January 28; 9:30 p.m. CST	@ L.A. Lakers	L 115–125	Pressey (24)	Cummings (6)	Moncrief (9)	The Forum; 17,505	31–16
48	January 30, 1986	@ Golden State	W 120–108				Oakland-Alameda County Coliseum Arena	32–16

February: 10–2 (home: 5–1; road: 5–1)

Game	Date	Team	Score	High points	High rebounds	High assists	Location Attendance	Record
49	February 1, 1986	@ Denver	L 113–116				McNichols Sports Arena	32–17
50	February 4; 7:30 p.m. CST	Boston	L 93–112	Cummings (24)	Cummings (13)	Pressey (6)	MECCA Arena; 11,052	32–18
51	February 6, 1986	Chicago	W 117–97				MECCA Arena	33–18
All-Star Break
52	February 12, 1986	@ Indiana	W 103–97				Market Square Arena	34–18
53	February 13, 1986	Utah	W 113–106				MECCA Arena	35–18
54	February 15, 1986	New Jersey	W 112–94				MECCA Arena	36–18
55	February 17, 1986	@ Philadelphia	W 111–106				The Spectrum	37–18
56	February 19, 1986	@ Dallas	W 124–107				Reunion Arena	38–18
57	February 20; 7:30 p.m. CST	@ Houston	W 120–113	Moncrief (28)	Breuer, Cummings (12)	Pressey (6)	The Summit; 14,448	39–18
58	February 22, 1986	@ San Antonio	W 120–115				HemisFair Arena	40–18
59	February 25, 1986	L.A. Clippers	W 114–99				MECCA Arena	41–18
60	February 28, 1986	Washington	W 102–84				MECCA Arena	42–18

March: 10–6 (home: 7–2; road: 3–4)

Game	Date	Team	Score	High points	High rebounds	High assists	Location Attendance	Record
61	March 2, 1986	@ Washington	L 104–125				Capital Centre	42–19
62	March 3, 1986	New York	W 115–108				MECCA Arena	43–19
63	March 5, 1986	@ New Jersey	W 119–106				Brendan Byrne Arena	44–19
64	March 7, 1986	Philadelphia	W 125–95				MECCA Arena	45–19
65	March 8, 1986; 6:30 p.m. CST	@ Atlanta	L 109–111	Pressey (30)	Lister (10)	Hodges (5)	The Omni; 15,822	45–20
66	March 12, 1986	Phoenix	L 126–127 (OT)				MECCA Arena	45–21
67	March 14, 1986	Indiana	L 104–114				MECCA Arena	45–22
68	March 15, 1986	@ Chicago	W 125–116 (OT)				Chicago Stadium	46–22
69	March 18, 1986	Washington	W 116–87				MECCA Arena	47–22
70	March 20; 7:30 p.m. CST	Houston	W 116–106	Cummings (25)	Cummings (15)	Pressey (10)	MECCA Arena; 11,052	48–22
71	March 22, 1986; 8:00 p.m. CST	Atlanta	W 113–98	Lister (18)	Cummings (9)	Pressey (8)	MECCA Arena; 11,052	48–23
72	March 25, 1986	New Jersey	W 118–105				MECCA Arena	49–23
73	March 26; 6:30 p.m. CST	@ Boston	L 115–121	Cummings (31)	Cummings (15)	Pressey(7)	Boston Garden; 14,890	50–23
74	March 28, 1986	@ Philadelphia	W 116–94				The Spectrum	51–23
75	March 29, 1986	Detroit	W 130–121				MECCA Arena	52–23

April: 5–2 (home: 3–1; road: 2–1)

Game	Date	Team	Score	High points	High rebounds	High assists	Location Attendance	Record
76	April 1, 1986	Chicago	W 116–107				MECCA Arena	53–23
77	April 3, 1986	Cleveland	W 114–93				MECCA Arena	54–23
78	April 4, 1986	@ Detroit	W 115–108				Pontiac Silverdome	55–23
79	April 7, 1986	@ Chicago	L 101–107				Chicago Stadium	55–24
80	April 8; 7:30 p.m. CST	Boston	L 114–126	Cummings (22)	Cummings (9)	Moncrief (5)	MECCA Arena; 11,052	55–25
81	April 10, 1986	@ Cleveland	W 102–101				Richfield Coliseum	56–25
82	April 12, 1986	New York	W 116–78				MECCA Arena	57–25

1985–86 schedule

== Playoffs ==
1986 playoff game log
First Round: 3–0 (home: 2–0; road: 1–0)

Game	Date	Team	Score	High points	High rebounds	High assists	Location Attendance	Series
1	April 18, 1986	New Jersey	W 119–107	Craig Hodges (25)	Alton Lister (10)	Paul Pressey (10)	MECCA Arena; 11,052	1–0
2	April 20, 1986	New Jersey	W 111–97	Terry Cummings (28)	Terry Cummings (7)	Paul Pressey (7)	MECCA Arena; 11,052	2–0
3	April 22, 1986	@ New Jersey	W 118–113	Terry Cummings (23)	Terry Cummings (11)	Sidney Moncrief (5)	Brendan Byrne Arena; 7,784	3–0

Conference semifinals: 4–3 (home: 3–1; road: 1–2)

Game	Date	Team	Score	High points	High rebounds	High assists	Location Attendance	Series
1	April 29, 1986	Philadelphia	L 112–118	Terry Cummings (23)	Terry Cummings (7)	Paul Pressey (13)	MECCA Arena; 11,052	0–1
2	May 1, 1986	Philadelphia	W 119–107	Terry Cummings (30)	Terry Cummings (15)	Paul Pressey (7)	MECCA Arena; 11,052	1–1
3	May 3, 1986	@ Philadelphia	L 103–107	Terry Cummings (27)	Cummings, Lister (9)	Paul Pressey (9)	The Spectrum; 14,611	1–2
4	May 5, 1986	@ Philadelphia	W 109–104	Cummings, Pierce (19)	Terry Cummings (13)	three players tied (4)	The Spectrum; 17,941	2–2
5	May 7, 1986	Philadelphia	W 113–108	Pressey, Cummings (23)	Terry Cummings (11)	Paul Pressey (16)	MECCA Arena; 11,052	3–2
6	May 9, 1986	@ Philadelphia	L 108–126	Craig Hodges (22)	Alton Lister (10)	Terry Cummings (5)	The Spectrum; 15,287	3–3
7	May 11, 1986	Philadelphia	W 113–112	Terry Cummings (27)	Terry Cummings (8)	Paul Pressey (15)	MECCA Arena; 11,052	4–3

Eastern Conference Finals: 0–4 (home: 0–2; road: 0–2)

Game	Date	Team	Score	High points	High rebounds	High assists	Location Attendance	Series
1	May 13; 7:00 p.m. CDT	@ Boston	L 96–128	Fields (18)	Cummings (11)	Cummings, Fields, Hodges (3)	Boston Garden; 14,890	0–1
2	May 15; 7:00 p.m. CDT	@ Boston	L 111–122	Cummings (23)	Lister (7)	Pressey (9)	Boston Garden; 14,890	0–2
3	May 17; 1:00 p.m. CDT	Boston	L 107–111	Cummings (27)	Cummings (18)	Pressey (9)	MECCA Arena; 11,052	0–3
4	May 18; 2:30 p.m. CDT	Boston	L 98–111	Moncrief (27)	Lister (12)	Moncrief (8)	MECCA Arena; 11,052	0–4

1986 schedule

== Player statistics ==
Legend
GP	Games played	GS	Games started	MPG	Minutes per game
FG%	Field-goal percentage	3P%	3-point field-goal percentage	FT%	Free-throw percentage
RPG	Rebounds per game	APG	Assists per game	SPG	Steals per game
BPG	Blocks per game	PPG	Points per game

=== Season ===
Player	GP	GS	MPG	FG%	3FG%	FT%	RPG	APG	SPG	BPG	PPG
Sidney Moncrief	73	72	35.2	48.9	32.0	85.9	4.6	4.9	1.4	0.2	20.2
Terry Cummings	82	82	32.5	47.4	0.0	65.6	8.5	2.4	1.5	0.6	19.8
Paul Pressey	80	80	33.8	48.8	18.2	80.6	5.0	7.8	2.1	0.9	14.3
Ricky Pierce	81	8	26.5	53.8	13.0	85.8	2.9	2.2	1.0	0.1	13.9
Craig Hodges	66	66	26.3	50.0	45.1	87.2	1.8	3.5	1.1	0.0	10.8
Alton Lister	81	19	22.4	55.1	0.0	60.2	7.3	1.2	0.6	1.8	9.8
Randy Breuer	82	63	21.9	47.7	0.0	71.2	5.6	1.4	0.6	1.4	8.4
Charles Davis	57	7	15.3	47.4	12.5	81.3	3.0	1.0	0.5	0.1	7.7
Kenny Fields	78	3	14.4	51.3	0.0	68.9	2.6	1.0	0.7	0.2	6.4
Jeff Lamp	44	1	15.9	44.9	23.1	85.9	2.8	1.5	0.5	0.1	6.3
Mike Glenn	38	1	15.1	49.5	0.0	95.9	1.5	1.0	0.2	0.1	6.2
Jerry Reynolds	55	8	9.2	44.4	50.0	55.8	1.5	1.6	0.8	0.3	3.7
Paul Mokeski	45	0	11.6	42.4	0.0	73.5	3.1	0.7	0.1	0.1	3.2
Bryan Warrick	5	0	5.4	40.0	50.0	100.0	0.6	1.2	0.4	0.0	2.0
Derrick Rowland	2	0	4.5	33.3	0.0	50.0	0.5	0.5	0.0	0.0	1.5
Earl Jones	12	0	3.6	41.7	0.0	75.0	0.8	0.3	0.0	0.1	1.1

=== Playoffs ===
Player	GP	GS	MPG	FG%	3FG%	FT%	RPG	APG	SPG	BPG	PPG
Terry Cummings	14	14	36.4	51.4	0.0	69.4	9.9	3.0	1.4	1.1	21.6
Sidney Moncrief	9	9	36.3	42.6	28.6	69.8	4.6	4.9	0.6	0.6	16.9
Paul Pressey	14	14	37.9	48.4	33.3	76.1	4.3	7.9	1.3	0.9	16.1
Craig Hodges	14	14	32.9	51.0	45.2	79.4	1.8	4.5	2.3	0.1	13.5
Alton Lister	14	1	23.9	64.1	0.0	60.3	6.9	0.9	0.5	1.6	11.9
Ricky Pierce	13	0	24.8	46.0	0.0	88.9	2.8	1.5	0.6	0.2	11.1
Randy Breuer	14	14	22.7	53.5	0.0	68.4	4.3	0.8	0.8	1.3	8.4
Kenny Fields	12	4	13.2	55.1	33.3	52.2	2.3	0.8	0.7	0.0	7.4
Charles Davis	12	0	12.1	36.2	0.0	90.0	2.1	0.5	0.3	0.0	5.0
Mike Glenn	10	0	11.4	36.1	0.0	83.3	1.1	0.8	0.1	0.0	3.6
Jerry Reynolds	7	0	5.7	41.2	0.0	54.5	1.3	0.6	0.6	0.4	2.9
Paul Mokeski	14	0	7.2	51.9	0.0	66.7	1.7	0.6	0.4	0.2	2.4

== Awards and records ==
- Sidney Moncrief, All-NBA Second Team
- Sidney Moncrief, NBA All-Defensive First Team
- Paul Pressey, NBA All-Defensive First Team

== Transactions ==
=== Trades ===
August 9, 1985
To Milwaukee Bucks----
- Mark McNamara
To Sacramento Kings----
- 1986 4th round pick (Bob Beecher)

=== Free agents ===
Player	Signed	Former team
Jeff Lamp	September 28, 1985	Portland Trail Blazers
