= 1985–86 Los Angeles Lakers season =

NBA professional basketball team season

- Division champions
- Head coach: Pat Riley
- General manager: Jerry West
- Owners: Jerry Buss
- Arena: The Forum

Results
- Record: 62–20 (.756)
- Place: Division: 1st (Pacific); Conference: 1st (Western)
- Playoff finish: Conference finals (lost to Rockets 1–4)
- Stats at Basketball Reference

Local media
- Television: KHJ-TV; Prime Ticket
- Radio: KLAC

The 1985–86 Los Angeles Lakers season was the 40th season of the franchise, 38th in the National Basketball Association (NBA) and 26th in Los Angeles. The Lakers entered the season as the defending NBA champions, having defeated the previous NBA champion and rival Boston Celtics in the 1985 NBA Finals in six games, having finally defeated the Celtics in the NBA Finals after having lost to them 8 consecutive times in the championship series. The Lakers looked to repeat as NBA Champions, after sweeping the San Antonio Spurs in three games in the First Round, and then defeating the Dallas Mavericks in six games in the Semi-finals in the playoffs, but were unable to defend their title, as they lost to the Houston Rockets in the conference finals in five games after winning the first game, but proceeded to lose the following four. The Rockets would go on to lose to the Boston Celtics in the NBA Finals in six games.

== NBA draft ==
The 1985 NBA draft took place on June 18, 1985. It was also the first NBA Draft of the "Lottery" era. The lottery was put into place so teams did not have to intentionally lose games to receive the number one pick.

Round	Pick	Player	Position	Nationality	School/Club team
1	23	A.C. Green	Forward	United States	Oregon State

== Roster ==
1985–86 Los Angeles Lakers roster
Players

Pos.	No.	Player	Height	Weight	DOB	From
C	33	Kareem Abdul-Jabbar	7 ft 2 in (2.18 m)	225 lb (102 kg)	1947-04-16	UCLA
SG	21	Michael Cooper	6 ft 5 in (1.96 m)	170 lb (77 kg)	1956-04-15	New Mexico
PF	45	A.C. Green	6 ft 9 in (2.06 m)	220 lb (100 kg)	1963-10-04	Oregon State
C	34	Pétur Guðmundsson	7 ft 2 in (2.18 m)	260 lb (118 kg)	1958-10-30	Washington
PG	32	Magic Johnson	6 ft 9 in (2.06 m)	215 lb (98 kg)	1959-08-14	Michigan State
PF	25	Mitch Kupchak	6 ft 9 in (2.06 m)	230 lb (104 kg)	1954-05-24	North Carolina
PF	20	Maurice Lucas	6 ft 9 in (2.06 m)	215 lb (98 kg)	1952-02-18	Marquette
SF	40	Mike McGee	6 ft 5 in (1.96 m)	190 lb (86 kg)	1959-07-29	Michigan
PF	31	Kurt Rambis	6 ft 8 in (2.03 m)	213 lb (97 kg)	1958-02-25	Santa Clara
SG	4	Byron Scott	6 ft 3 in (1.91 m)	195 lb (88 kg)	1961-03-28	Arizona State
SF	35	Larry Spriggs	6 ft 7 in (2.01 m)	230 lb (104 kg)	1959-09-08	Howard
SF	42	James Worthy	6 ft 9 in (2.06 m)	225 lb (102 kg)	1961-02-27	North Carolina

Coaches
Head coach
- Pat Riley
Assistant(s)
- Bill Bertka
- Randy Pfund
- Gary Vitti (trainer)

Legend
- (DP) Unsigned draft pick
- (FA) Free agent
- (S) Suspended
- Injured

Roster
Updated: March 19, 1986

== Regular season ==
- On Wednesday, December 4, 1985, Maurice Lucas made a 60-foot shot at the regulation buzzer to send the game into overtime. The Lakers would go on to defeat the Utah Jazz 131–127.
- The Lakers started the season 19–2.
- On Wednesday, January 22, 1986, the Boston Celtics (31–8) defeated the defending champion Lakers (32–8) 110–95 in a matchup of the league's two best teams.
- On Friday, January 24, 1986, the Boston Celtics (32–8) overtook the Los Angeles Lakers (32–9) as the team with the best record in the NBA. The Celtics maintained the league's best record for the remainder of the season.
- On Thursday, February 6, 1986, Kareem Abdul-Jabbar scored 46 points in a game against the Houston Rockets, his highest single-game total since a 48-point performance against the Portland Trail Blazers on November 26, 1975. The Lakers defeated the Rockets 117–95.
- On Sunday, February 16, 1986, in the season's second matchup between the Celtics and Lakers, this time in the Forum. Boston won again, 105-99 despite not having All-Star Kevin McHale in the lineup.

=== Season standings ===
Pacific Division	W	L	PCT	GB	Home	Road	Div
y-Los Angeles Lakers	62	20	.756	–	35–6	27–14	23–7
x-Portland Trail Blazers	40	42	.488	22	27–14	13–28	18–12
Phoenix Suns	32	50	.390	30	23–18	9–32	16–14
Los Angeles Clippers	32	50	.390	30	22–19	10–31	10–20
Seattle SuperSonics	31	51	.378	31	24–17	7–34	11–19
Golden State Warriors	30	52	.366	32	24–17	6–35	12–18

#	Western Conference				
#	Team	W	L	PCT	GB
1	c-Los Angeles Lakers	62	20	.756	–
2	y-Houston Rockets	51	31	.622	11
3	x-Denver Nuggets	47	35	.573	15
4	x-Dallas Mavericks	44	38	.537	18
5	x-Utah Jazz	42	40	.512	20
6	x-Portland Trail Blazers	40	42	.488	22
7	x-Sacramento Kings	37	45	.451	25
8	x-San Antonio Spurs	35	47	.427	27
9	Phoenix Suns	32	50	.390	30
10	Los Angeles Clippers	32	50	.390	30
11	Seattle SuperSonics	31	51	.378	31
12	Golden State Warriors	30	52	.366	32

== Game log ==
=== Regular season ===
1985–86 game log
Total: 62–20 (home: 35–6; road: 27–14)
October: 3–0 (home: 0–0; road: 3–0)

Game	Date	Team	Score	High points	High rebounds	High assists	Location Attendance	Record
1	October 26	@ San Antonio	W 121–116 (2OT)	James Worthy (24)	Maurice Lucas (10)	Michael Cooper (15)	HemisFair Arena; 10,875	1–0
2	October 29	@ Dallas	W 133–115	James Worthy (21)	A.C. Green (16)	Michael Cooper (11)	Reunion Arena; 17,007	2–0
3	October 31	@ Phoenix	W 144–107	Byron Scott (31)	Johnson & Rambis (7)	Michael Cooper (15)	Arizona Veterans Memorial Coliseum; 11,661	3–0

November: 11–2 (home: 7–1; road: 4–1)

Game	Date	Team	Score	High points	High rebounds	High assists	Location Attendance	Record
4	November 2	@ Golden State	W 120–116	Kareem Abdul-Jabbar (31)	Kurt Rambis (9)	Magic Johnson (13)	Oakland-Alameda County Coliseum Arena; 14,401	4–0
5	November 5	Cleveland	L 111–129	Magic Johnson (23)	Magic Johnson (8)	Cooper & Johnson (8)	The Forum; 17,505	4–1
6	November 7	@ Utah	W 116–106	James Worthy (26)	Maurice Lucas (12)	Magic Johnson (12)	Salt Palace; 12,631	5–1
7	November 8	Denver	W 128–99	Byron Scott (29)	Magic Johnson (10)	Magic Johnson (12)	The Forum; 16,573	6–1
8	November 12	Utah	W 119–110	Kareem Abdul-Jabbar (25)	A.C. Green (8)	Magic Johnson (10)	The Forum; 14,496	7–1
9	November 14	Portland	W 114–102	Magic Johnson (30)	3 players tied (9)	Magic Johnson (12)	The Forum; 14,713	8–1
10	November 15	@ L.A. Clippers	W 127–96	Mike McGee (19)	Magic Johnson (9)	Magic Johnson (14)	Los Angeles Memorial Sports Arena; 11,380	9–1
11	November 17	New Jersey	W 138–119	Mike McGee (26)	Kupchak & Lucas (8)	Magic Johnson (15)	The Forum; 16,101	10–1
12	November 20	L.A. Clippers	W 122–107	Magic Johnson (22)	Maurice Lucas (11)	Magic Johnson (20)	The Forum; 15,214	11–1
13	November 21	@ Denver	L 120–121	Kareem Abdul-Jabbar (32)	Abdul-Jabbar & Lucas (10)	Magic Johnson (18)	McNichols Sports Arena; 17,022	11–2
14	November 23	@ Portland	W 130–113	James Worthy (25)	Kurt Rambis (12)	Magic Johnson (14)	Memorial Coliseum; 12,666	12–2
15	November 24	San Antonio	W 118–102	Magic Johnson (23)	Kurt Rambis (11)	Magic Johnson (13)	The Forum; 15,259	13–2
16	November 29	Seattle	W 108–107	Kareem Abdul-Jabbar (31)	Magic Johnson (16)	Magic Johnson (17)	The Forum; 17,505	14–2

December: 11–3 (home: 5–1; road: 6–2)

Game	Date	Team	Score	High points	High rebounds	High assists	Location Attendance	Record
17	December 1	Chicago	W 117–113	James Worthy (33)	Maurice Lucas (11)	Magic Johnson (17)	The Forum; 17,505	15–2
18	December 4	@ Utah	W 131–127 (OT)	Magic Johnson (29)	Magic Johnson (9)	Magic Johnson (8)	Salt Palace; 12,287	16–2
19	December 6, 1985; 7:30 p.m. PST	Houston	W 120–112	Abdul-Jabbar (35)	Green, Lucas (9)	Johnson (14)	The Forum; 17,505	17–2
20	December 8	Dallas	W 125–119	Byron Scott (30)	Green & Rambis (9)	Magic Johnson (15)	The Forum; 15,810	18–2
21	December 12	Phoenix	W 127–102	Kareem Abdul-Jabbar (35)	Green & Kupchak (7)	Magic Johnson (20)	The Forum; 14,558	19–2
22	December 13	@ Denver	L 120–124	James Worthy (37)	Magic Johnson (11)	Kareem Abdul-Jabbar (7)	McNichols Sports Arena; 17,022	19–3
23	December 15	Detroit	W 132–119	James Worthy (25)	Kurt Rambis (11)	Magic Johnson (15)	The Forum; 17,505	20–3
24	December 17	@ New York	W 105–99	Kareem Abdul-Jabbar (26)	Maurice Lucas (10)	Magic Johnson (12)	Madison Square Garden; 19,591	21–3
25	December 18, 1985; 5:30 p.m. PST	@ Milwaukee	W 107–105	Abdul-Jabbar (31)	Rambis (13)	Cooper, Johnson (8)	MECCA Arena; 11,052	22–3
26	December 20	@ Cleveland	W 128–116	Kareem Abdul-Jabbar (29)	Kareem Abdul-Jabbar (9)	Magic Johnson (14)	Richfield Coliseum; 20,900	23–3
27	December 21	@ Washington	W 96–84	Kareem Abdul-Jabbar (29)	Abdul-Jabbar & Johnson (8)	Magic Johnson (13)	Capital Centre; 19,123	24–3
28	December 26	@ San Antonio	L 91–109	Kareem Abdul-Jabbar (24)	Kurt Rambis (6)	Magic Johnson (8)	HemisFair Arena; 15,786	24–4
29	December 28	@ Sacramento	W 133–111	James Worthy (31)	Lucas & Worthy (7)	Magic Johnson (13)	ARCO Arena I 10,333	25–4
30	December 29	Golden State	L 122–130	Magic Johnson (30)	James Worthy (8)	Magic Johnson (12)	The Forum; 17,505	25–5

January: 10–5 (home: 8–1; road: 2–4)

Game	Date	Team	Score	High points	High rebounds	High assists	Location Attendance	Record
31	January 3	Utah	W 110–101	Kareem Abdul-Jabbar (25)	Abdul-Jabbar & Worthy (7)	Michael Cooper (9)	The Forum; 17,505	26–5
32	January 5	Washington	W 118–88	A.C. Green (20)	A.C. Green (10)	Magic Johnson (17)	The Forum; 17,505	27–5
33	January 8	Portland	W 125–121	James Worthy (30)	James Worthy (10)	Magic Johnson (16)	The Forum; 16,481	28–5
34	January 10	Indiana	W 124–102	Kareem Abdul-Jabbar (31)	Kurt Rambis (13)	Magic Johnson (11)	The Forum; 17,505	29–5
35	January 11	@ Seattle	L 99–105	James Worthy (26)	Maurice Lucas (9)	Magic Johnson (16)	Seattle Center Coliseum; 14,230	29–6
36	January 14	Phoenix	W 143–122	James Worthy (23)	Magic Johnson (9)	Magic Johnson (19)	The Forum; 14,615	30–6
37	January 16	L.A. Clippers	W 112–96	Kareem Abdul-Jabbar (26)	Maurice Lucas (14)	Michael Cooper (13)	The Forum; 17,505	31–6
38	January 19	@ Detroit	L 115–118	Kareem Abdul-Jabbar (38)	Maurice Lucas (12)	Magic Johnson (18)	Pontiac Silverdome; 28,548	31–7
39	January 20	@ Chicago	W 133–118	James Worthy (33)	Maurice Lucas (12)	Magic Johnson (14)	Chicago Stadium; 17,284	32–7
40	January 22, 1986; 5:00 p.m. PST	@ Boston	L 95–110	Abdul-Jabbar (17)	Green, Lucas (10)	Johnson (6)	Boston Garden; 14,890	32–8
41	January 24	@ L.A. Clippers	L 109–120	James Worthy (26)	James Worthy (11)	Michael Cooper (13)	Los Angeles Memorial Sports Arena; 14,858	32–9
42	January 25	Denver	L 115–127	Kareem Abdul-Jabbar (26)	Kurt Rambis (10)	Kareem Abdul-Jabbar (9)	The Forum; 17,505	32–10
43	January 28, 1986; 7:30 p.m. PST	Milwaukee	W 125–115	Abdul-Jabbar (32)	Lucas (8)	Cooper (11)	The Forum; 17,505	33–10
44	January 30	@ Portland	W 118–94	Kareem Abdul-Jabbar (25)	Kareem Abdul-Jabbar (9)	Michael Cooper (12)	Memorial Coliseum; 12,666	34–10
45	January 31	Philadelphia	W 134–100	Byron Scott (24)	Kurt Rambis (8)	Michael Cooper (13)	The Forum; 17,505	35–10

February: 8–5 (home: 3–2; road: 5–3)

Game	Date	Team	Score	High points	High rebounds	High assists	Location Attendance	Record
46	February 2	New York	L 96–103	Kareem Abdul-Jabbar (40)	Kurt Rambis (10)	Michael Cooper (11)	The Forum; 17,505	35–11
47	February 4	Dallas	W 110–102	Abdul-Jabbar & McGee (21)	Maurice Lucas	Abdul-Jabbar & Johnson (8)	The Forum; 16,275	36–11
48	February 6, 1986; 5:30 p.m. PST	@ Houston	W 117–95	Abdul-Jabbar (46)	Worthy (13)	Cooper (9)	The Summit; 16,016	37–11
All-Star Break
49	February 11	@ Golden State	L 113–137	James Worthy (21)	Lucas & Rambis (10)	Magic Johnson (10)	Oakland-Alameda County Coliseum Arena; 15,011	37–12
50	February 12	@ Phoenix	W 126–100	Mike McGee (34)	Kurt Rambis (11)	Magic Johnson (11)	Arizona Veterans Memorial Coliseum; 12,048	38–12
51	February 14	Atlanta	W 141–117	Kareem Abdul-Jabbar (25)	Kurt Rambis (12)	Magic Johnson (16)	The Forum; 17,505	39–12
52	February 16, 1986; 12:30 p.m. PST	Boston	L 99–105	Worthy (35)	Abdul-Jabbar (9)	Johnson (12)	The Forum; 17,505	39–13
53	February 19	@ Indiana	W 90–81	Abdul-Jabbar & Johnson (21)	Maurice Lucas (10)	Magic Johnson (10)	Market Square Arena; 16,904	40–13
54	February 21	@ New Jersey	L 106–121	Kareem Abdul-Jabbar (28)	Maurice Lucas (8)	Magic Johnson (10)	Brendan Byrne Arena; 20,149	40–14
55	February 23	@ Philadelphia	W 117–111 (OT)	Magic Johnson (34)	Maurice Lucas (8)	Magic Johnson (11)	The Spectrum; 17,941	41–14
56	February 24	@ Atlanta	L 93–102	Johnson & Lucas (23)	Kareem Abdul-Jabbar (12)	Magic Johnson (5)	Omni Coliseum; 16,522	41–15
57	February 26	@ Dallas	W 119–116	Kareem Abdul-Jabbar (25)	3 players tied (7)	Magic Johnson (9)	Reunion Arena; 17,007	42–15
58	February 28	Phoenix	W 115–103	Kareem Abdul-Jabbar (25)	Kurt Rambis (8)	Magic Johnson (12)	The Forum; 17,505	43–15

March: 14–3 (home: 9–0; road: 5–3)

Game	Date	Team	Score	High points	High rebounds	High assists	Location Attendance	Record
59	March 1	@ Phoenix	L 106–123	Maurice Lucas (23)	Maurice Lucas (12)	Magic Johnson (9)	Arizona Veterans Memorial Coliseum; 14,013	43–16
60	March 3	Golden State	W 127–117	Kareem Abdul-Jabbar (34)	Kurt Rambis (16)	Magic Johnson (16)	The Forum; 16,045	44–16
61	March 5	Utah	W 130–84	Mike McGee (20)	Kurt Rambis (11)	Magic Johnson (8)	The Forum; 16,640	45–16
62	March 6	@ Golden State	W 112–111	Magic Johnson (30)	Kurt Rambis (12)	Magic Johnson (14)	Oakland-Alameda County Coliseum Arena; 15,011	46–16
63	March 8	Sacramento	W 122–121 (2OT)	Magic Johnson (33)	Kurt Rambis (11)	Magic Johnson (17)	The Forum; 17,505	47–16
64	March 9	@ Seattle	W 108–106	Magic Johnson (32)	Byron Scott (9)	Magic Johnson (9)	Seattle Center Coliseum; 10,312	48–16
65	March 11	L.A. Clippers	W 129–108	Kareem Abdul-Jabbar (19)	A.C. Green (11)	Magic Johnson (16)	The Forum; 15,656	49–16
66	March 13	Seattle	W 105–92	Magic Johnson (27)	Green & Rambis (8)	Magic Johnson (13)	The Forum; 17,505	50–16
67	March 16, 1986; 7:30 p.m. PST	Houston	W 116–111	Abdul-Jabbar (43)	Johnson (12)	Johnson (12)	The Forum; 17,505	51–16
68	March 18	Portland	W 128–122	Magic Johnson (26)	Abdul-Jabbar & Johnson (6)	Magic Johnson (11)	The Forum; 17,505	52–16
69	March 19	@ L.A. Clippers	L 114–115	Kareem Abdul-Jabbar (34)	Maurice Lucas (7)	Magic Johnson (11)	Los Angeles Memorial Sports Arena; 12,723	52–17
70	March 21	@ San Antonio	W 117–109	Magic Johnson (27)	Maurice Lucas (11)	Magic Johnson (10)	HemisFair Arena; 13,860	53–17
71	March 22	@ Sacramento	W 115–113	James Worthy (32)	Maurice Lucas (9)	Magic Johnson (14)	ARCO Arena I 10,333	54–17
72	March 24	San Antonio	W 124–102	Kareem Abdul-Jabbar (20)	Maurice Lucas (14)	Magic Johnson (12)	The Forum; 17,505	55–17
73	March 25	@ Denver	W 121–115	James Worthy (30)	James Worthy (10)	Magic Johnson (19)	McNichols Sports Arena; 17,022	56–17
74	March 29	@ Seattle	L 87–88	Magic Johnson (20)	James Worthy (7)	Magic Johnson (12)	Seattle Center Coliseum; 14,230	56–18
75	March 30	Golden State	W 124–117	James Worthy (34)	Kareem Abdul-Jabbar (10)	Magic Johnson (19)	The Forum; 17,505	56–19

April: 5–2 (home: 3–1; road: 2–1)

Game	Date	Team	Score	High points	High rebounds	High assists	Location Attendance	Record
76	April 1	Seattle	W 109–104	Kareem Abdul-Jabbar (25)	Kurt Rambis (13)	Magic Johnson (6)	The Forum; 17,505	57–19
77	April 3	Sacramento	W 135–105	Byron Scott (24)	Maurice Lucas (11)	Magic Johnson (16)	The Forum; 17,505	58–19
78	April 6, 1986; 12:30 p.m. PST	@ Houston	L 103–109	Johnson (20)	Abdul-Jabbar (7)	Johnson (20)	The Summit; 16,016	59–19
79	April 8	@ Portland	W 120–114	Kareem Abdul-Jabbar (26)	James Worthy (6)	Magic Johnson (10)	Memorial Coliseum; 12,666	60–19
80	April 10, 1986; 7:30 p.m. PST	Houston	W 117–113	Johnson (26)	Worthy (14)	Johnson (16)	The Forum; 17,505	61–19
81	April 12	@ Sacramento	W 105–92	Byron Scott (22)	Maurice Lucas (10)	Magic Johnson (8)	ARCO Arena I 10,333	62–19
82	April 13	Dallas	L 104–127	Byron Scott (24)	A.C. Green (10)	Michael Cooper (10)	The Forum; 17,505	62–20

1985–86 schedule

=== Playoffs ===
1986 playoff game log
Total: 8–6 (home: 6–2; road: 2–4)
First Round: 3–0 (home: 2–0; road: 1–0)

Game	Date	Team	Score	High points	High rebounds	High assists	Location Attendance	Series
1	April 17	San Antonio	W 135–88	Byron Scott (24)	Kurt Rambis (8)	Magic Johnson (18)	The Forum; 17,505	1–0
2	April 19	San Antonio	W 122–94	Magic Johnson (30)	Abdul-Jabbar & Lucas (10)	Magic Johnson (13)	The Forum; 17,505	2–0
3	April 23	@ San Antonio	W 114–94	Kareem Abdul-Jabbar (25)	Kurt Rambis (14)	Magic Johnson (17)	HemisFair Arena; 7,918	3–0

Conference semifinals: 4–2 (home: 3–0; road: 1–2)

Game	Date	Team	Score	High points	High rebounds	High assists	Location Attendance	Series
1	April 27	Dallas	W 130–116	Kareem Abdul-Jabbar (28)	Maurice Lucas (8)	Magic Johnson (14)	The Forum; 17,505	1–0
2	April 30	Dallas	W 117–113	Kareem Abdul-Jabbar (26)	Maurice Lucas (11)	Magic Johnson (9)	The Forum; 17,505	2–0
3	May 2	@ Dallas	L 108–110	Kareem Abdul-Jabbar (28)	Kareem Abdul-Jabbar (12)	Magic Johnson (14)	Reunion Arena; 17,007	2–1
4	May 4	@ Dallas	L 118–120	Kareem Abdul-Jabbar (33)	Magic Johnson (15)	Magic Johnson (14)	Reunion Arena; 17,007	2–2
5	May 6	Dallas	W 116–113	Kareem Abdul-Jabbar (34)	Kurt Rambis (10)	Magic Johnson (14)	The Forum; 17,505	3–2
6	May 8	@ Dallas	W 120–107	Kareem Abdul-Jabbar (27)	Maurice Lucas (8)	Magic Johnson (17)	Reunion Arena; 17,007	4–2

Western Conference Finals: 1–4 (home: 1–2; road: 0–2)

Game	Date	Team	Score	High points	High rebounds	High assists	Location Attendance	Series
1	May 10, 1986; 12:30 p.m. PDT	Houston	W 119–107	Abdul-Jabbar (31)	Johnson, Lucas (7)	Johnson (18)	The Forum; 17,505	1–0
2	May 13, 1986; 7:30 p.m. PDT	Houston	L 102–112	Johnson (24)	Rambis (9)	Johnson (19)	The Forum; 17,505	1–1
3	May 16, 1986; 6:30 p.m. PDT	@ Houston	L 109–117	Abdul-Jabbar (33)	Johnson, Lucas (8)	Johnson (20)	The Summit; 16,016	1–2
4	May 18, 1986; 12:30 p.m. PDT	@ Houston	L 95–105	Worthy (26)	Johnson (12)	Johnson (11)	The Summit; 16,016	1–3
5	May 21, 1986; 8:30 p.m. PDT	Houston	L 112–114	Abdul-Jabbar (26)	Abdul-Jabbar (13)	Johnson (13)	The Forum; 17,505	1–4

1986 schedule

== Player statistics ==
Note: GP= Games played; MPG= Minutes per Game; REB = Rebounds; AST = Assists; STL = Steals; BLK = Blocks; PTS = Points; PPG = Points per Game

=== Season ===
Player	GP	MPG	REB	AST	STL	BLK	PTS	PPG
Kareem Abdul-Jabbar	79	33.3	478	280	67	130	1846	23.4
James Worthy	75	32.7	387	201	82	77	1500	20.0
Magic Johnson	72	35.8	426	907	113	16	1354	18.8
Byron Scott	76	28.8	189	164	85	15	1174	15.4
Maurice Lucas	77	22.7	566	84	45	24	785	10.2
Michael Cooper	82	27.7	244	466	89	43	758	9.2
Mike McGee	71	17.1	140	83	53	7	587	8.3
A.C. Green	82	18.8	381	54	49	49	521	6.4
Kurt Rambis	74	21.3	517	69	66	33	408	5.5
Mitch Kupchak	55	14.2	191	17	12	7	332	6.0
Larry Spriggs	43	11.0	81	49	18	9	214	5.0
Ronnie Lester	27	8.2	10	54	9	3	67	2.5
Pétur Guðmundsson	8	16.0	38	3	3	4	58	7.3
Chuck Nevitt	4	6.3	7	2	2	2	10	2.5
Jerome Henderson	1	3.0	1	0	0	0	4	4.0

== Award winners ==
- Michael Cooper, J. Walter Kennedy Citizenship Award
- Magic Johnson, All-NBA First Team
- Kareem Abdul-Jabbar, All-NBA First Team
- Michael Cooper, NBA All-Defensive Second Team
