= Ben McDonald (basketball) =

American basketball player (born 1962)

Personal information
- Born: July 20, 1962 (age 64) Torrance, California, U.S.
- Listed height: 6 ft 8 in (2.03 m)
- Listed weight: 210 lb (95 kg)

Career information
- High school: Long Beach Polytechnic (Long Beach, California)
- College: UC Irvine (1980–1984)
- NBA draft: 1984: 3rd round, 50th overall pick
- Drafted by: Cleveland Cavaliers
- Playing career: 1984–1994
- Position: Power forward / small forward
- Number: 33, 30
- Coaching career: 1996–present

Career history

Playing
- 1984–1985: CB Collado Villalba
- 1985: Magia Huesca
- 1985–1986: Cleveland Cavaliers
- 1986–1989: Golden State Warriors
- 1988–1989: Hapoel Holon
- 1989–1990: Real Madrid Baloncesto
- 1990–1991: San Jose Jammers
- 1991: Albany Patroons
- 1992: Oklahoma City Cavalry
- 1992–1994: Gießen 46ers
- 1994: FC Porto

Coaching
- 1996–1997: Cal State Dominguez Hills (assistant)
- 2001–2004: Indiana (assistant)
- 2008–2014: Erie BayHawks (assistant)
- 2014–2015: Reno Bighorns (assistant)

Career highlights
- 2× First-team All-PCAA (1983, 1984); Second-team All-PCAA (1982); PCAA Freshman of the Year (1981)
- Stats at NBA.com
- Stats at Basketball Reference

Benjamin McDonald (born July 20, 1962) is an American former professional basketball player and former assistant coach for the Reno Bighorns of the NBA Development League. He played college basketball for the California-Irvine Anteaters. After graduating, he played for the Cleveland Cavaliers for one season and the Golden State Warriors for three seasons. In 176 games, he averaged 21.0 minutes and 6.0 points per game. After his NBA career, McDonald played for Israeli team Hapoel Holon, and also played two seasons in the Continental Basketball Association for the Albany Patroons, San Jose Jammers and Oklahoma City Cavalry. For his CBA career, McDonald averaged 7.6 points and 5.8 rebounds in 70 games.

== Career statistics ==
Legend
GP	Games played	GS	Games started	MPG	Minutes per game
FG%	Field goal percentage	3P%	3-point field goal percentage	FT%	Free throw percentage
RPG	Rebounds per game	APG	Assists per game	SPG	Steals per game
BPG	Blocks per game	PPG	Points per game	**Bold**	Career high

=== NBA ===
==== Regular season ====
Year	Team	GP	GS	MPG	FG%	3P%	FT%	RPG	APG	SPG	BPG	PPG
1985–86	Cleveland	21	0	12.7	.483	.000	.625	1.8	.4	.3	.0	2.9
1986–87	Golden State	63	34	20.4	.456	.125	.632	2.9	1.3	.4	**.1**	5.6
1987–88	Golden State	**81**	**41**	**25.2**	.467	**.257**	**.784**	**4.1**	**1.7**	**.5**	**.1**	**7.6**
1988–89	Golden State	11	0	9.4	**.684**	–	.600	1.1	.5	.4	.0	3.2
Career		176	75	21.0	.468	.227	.727	3.2	1.3	.4	.1	6.0

==== Playoffs ====
Year	Team	GP	GS	MPG	FG%	3P%	FT%	RPG	APG	SPG	BPG	PPG
1987	Golden State	**5**	0	**9.0**	.091	.000	–	1.2	**1.8**	.4	.0	.4
1989	Golden State	**5**	0	8.0	**.200**	.000	**.500**	**1.6**	.2	**.6**	**.2**	**1.2**
Career		10	0	8.5	.143	.000	.500	1.4	1.0	.5	.1	.8
