= 1985–86 Philadelphia 76ers season =

NBA professional basketball team season

- Head coach: Matt Guokas
- General manager: Pat Williams
- Arena: The Spectrum

Results
- Record: 54–28 (.659)
- Place: Division: 2nd (Atlantic); Conference: 3rd (Eastern)
- Playoff finish: Conference semifinals (lost to Bucks 3–4)
- Stats at Basketball Reference

Local media
- Television: WPHL-TV; PRISM
- Radio: WIP

The 1985–86 Philadelphia 76ers season was the 76ers 37th season in the NBA and 23rd season in Philadelphia. After a slow 12-12 start to the season, the Sixers would go 42-16 the rest of the way to end the regular season with a 54–28 record. In the first round off the playoffs they would beat the Washington Bullets in five games, but then lost a tough seven-game series to the Milwaukee Bucks, a team that the Sixers had beaten in the playoffs in 1981, 1982, 1983, and 1985.

This would be the last season for Bobby Jones, who would retire, and the last season for Moses Malone in a Philadelphia uniform, who was dealt away in the Summer of 1986. Due to an eye injury sustained towards the end of the regular season, Malone did not participate in the 1986 NBA playoffs. Andrew Toney only played in six regular season games due to a foot injury and never was able to make it back to his previous All-Star form. The team also added forward/center Bob McAdoo, who won 2 championships with the Lakers in 1982 and 1985.

== Draft picks ==
Round	Pick	Player	Position	Nationality	College
1	21	Terry Catledge	PF	United States	South Alabama
2	33	Greg Stokes	PF/C	United States	Iowa
2	44	Voise Winters		United States	Bradley
3	67	Steve Black		United States	La Salle
4	90	Derrick Gervin	SF	United States	Texas-San Antonio
5	113	Carl Wright		United States	Southern Methodist
6	136	Daryl Lloyd		United States	Drake
7	159	Jaye Andrews		United States	Bucknell

== Roster ==
1985–86 Philadelphia 76ers roster
Players

Pos.	No.	Player	Height	Weight	DOB	From
F	34	Charles Barkley	6 ft 6 in (1.98 m)	252 lb (114 kg)	1963–02–20	Auburn
F	23	Terry Catledge	6 ft 8 in (2.03 m)	220 lb (100 kg)	1963-08-22	South Alabama
G	10	Maurice Cheeks	6 ft 1 in (1.85 m)	180 lb (82 kg)	1956–09–08	West Texas A&M
F	6	Julius Erving	6 ft 6 in (1.98 m)	210 lb (95 kg)	1950-02-22	UMass
F	21	Kenny Green	6 ft 6 in (1.98 m)	210 lb (95 kg)	1964–10–11	Wake Forest
C	45	Clemon Johnson	6 ft 10 in (2.08 m)	240 lb (109 kg)	1956–09–12	Florida A&M
F	24	Bobby Jones	6 ft 9 in (2.06 m)	210 lb (95 kg)	1951–12–18	North Carolina
C	2	Moses Malone (injured)	6 ft 11 in (2.11 m)	235 lb (107 kg)	1955–03–23	Petersburg High School
C	11	Bob McAdoo	6 ft 9 in (2.06 m)	210 lb (95 kg)	1951–09–25	USC
G	9	Perry Moss	6 ft 2 in (1.88 m)	185 lb (84 kg)	1958-11-11	Northeastern
F	41	Greg Stokes	6 ft 10 in (2.08 m)	220 lb (100 kg)	1963-08-05	Iowa
F	44	Paul Thompson	6 ft 6 in (1.98 m)	210 lb (95 kg)	1961-05-25	Tulane
G	3	Sedale Threatt	6 ft 2 in (1.88 m)	175 lb (79 kg)	1961–09–10	West Virginia Tech
G	22	Andrew Toney (injured)	6 ft 3 in (1.91 m)	178 lb (81 kg)	1957–11–23	Louisiana
F	8	Michael Young	6 ft 7 in (2.01 m)	220 lb (100 kg)	1961–01–02	Houston

Coaches
Head coach
- Matt Guokas

Legend
- (DP) Unsigned draft pick
- (FA) Free agent
- (S) Suspended
- Injured

== Regular season ==
=== Season standings ===
Atlantic Division	W	L	PCT	GB	Home	Road	Div
y-Boston Celtics	67	15	.817	–	40–1	27–14	18–6
x-Philadelphia 76ers	54	28	.659	13	31–10	23–18	15–9
x-Washington Bullets	39	43	.476	28	26–15	13–28	11–13
x-New Jersey Nets	39	43	.476	28	26–15	13–28	11–13
New York Knicks	23	59	.280	44	15–26	8–33	5–19

#	Eastern Conference				
#	Team	W	L	PCT	GB
1	z-Boston Celtics	67	15	.817	–
2	y-Milwaukee Bucks	57	25	.695	10
3	x-Philadelphia 76ers	54	28	.659	13
4	x-Atlanta Hawks	50	32	.610	17
5	x-Detroit Pistons	46	36	.561	21
6	x-Washington Bullets	39	43	.476	28
7	x-New Jersey Nets	39	43	.476	28
8	x-Chicago Bulls	30	52	.366	37
9	Cleveland Cavaliers	29	53	.354	38
10	Indiana Pacers	26	56	.317	41
11	New York Knicks	23	59	.280	44

z – clinched division title
y – clinched division title
x – clinched playoff spot

== Game log ==
=== Regular season ===
1985–86 game log
Total: 54-28 (home: 31-10; road: 23-18)
October: 2–1 (home: 1–0; road: 1–1)

Game	Date	Team	Score	High points	High rebounds	High assists	Location Attendance	Record
1	October 26, 1985	@ New York	W 99–89				Madison Square Garden	1–0
2	October 29, 1985	@ Milwaukee	L 117–119				MECCA Arena	1–1
3	October 30, 1985	Detroit	W 132–125 (OT)				The Spectrum	2–1

November: 7–7 (home: 4–3; road: 3–4)

Game	Date	Team	Score	High points	High rebounds	High assists	Location Attendance	Record
4	November 1, 1985	@ New Jersey	L 102–106				Brendan Byrne Arena	2–2
5	November 2, 1985; 7:30 p.m. EST	@ Atlanta	L 113–114 (OT)	Barkley (21)	Malone (15)	Barkley (6)	The Omni; 12,214	2–3
6	November 6, 1985	Indiana	W 105–97				The Spectrum	3–3
7	November 8, 1985	San Antonio	L 95–107				The Spectrum	3–4
8	November 10, 1985	Milwaukee	W 105–97				The Spectrum	4–4
9	November 13, 1985	Chicago	W 110–106				The Spectrum	5–4
10	November 16, 1985	@ Washington	L 97–118				Capital Centre	5–5
11	November 20, 1985	Golden State	W 117–113				The Spectrum	6–5
12	November 22, 1985	@ Boston	L 103–110				Boston Garden	6–6
13	November 23, 1985	Detroit	L 114–119				The Spectrum	6–7
14	November 26, 1985	Boston	L 91–98				The Spectrum	6–8
15	November 27, 1985	@ New Jersey	W 111–100				Brendan Byrne Arena	7–8
16	November 29, 1985	@ Indiana	W 110–109				Market Square Arena	8–8
17	November 30, 1985	@ New York	W 115–95				Madison Square Garden	9–8

December: 10–4 (home: 5–2; road: 5–2)

Game	Date	Team	Score	High points	High rebounds	High assists	Location Attendance	Record
18	December 3, 1985	@ Detroit	W 127–107				Pontiac Silverdome	10–8
19	December 4, 1985	Washington	W 115–110 (OT)				The Spectrum	11–8
20	December 6, 1985	Denver	L 121–123				The Spectrum	11–9
21	December 8, 1985	Seattle	L 100–105				The Spectrum	11–10
22	December 11, 1985	Cleveland	W 125–110				The Spectrum	12–10
23	December 12, 1985	@ Chicago	L 102–106				Chicago Stadium	12–11
24	December 14, 1985; 7:30 p.m. EST	@ Atlanta	L 103–107	Malone (30)	Malone (11)	Cheeks (5)	The Omni; 4,638	12–12
25	December 17, 1985	@ Indiana	W 102–96				Market Square Arena	13–12
26	December 18, 1985	Houston	W 126–108				The Spectrum	14–12
27	December 20, 1985	Utah	W 112–105				The Spectrum	15–12
28	December 21, 1985	Boston	W 108–102				The Spectrum	16–12
29	December 26, 1985	@ L.A. Clippers	W 117–108				Los Angeles Memorial Sports Arena	17–12
30	December 28, 1985	@ Phoenix	W 100–98				Arizona Veterans Memorial Coliseum	18–12
31	December 30, 1985	@ Sacramento	W 87–84				ARCO Arena	19–12

January: 11–5 (home: 4–1; road: 7–4)

Game	Date	Team	Score	High points	High rebounds	High assists	Location Attendance	Record
32	January 1, 1986	@ Portland	W 121–119 (OT)				Memorial Coliseum	20–12
33	January 4, 1986	@ Houston	L 100–115				The Summit	20–13
34	January 6, 1986	@ San Antonio	W 108–102				HemisFair Arena	21–13
35	January 8, 1986	L.A. Clippers	W 116–114				The Spectrum	22–13
36	January 10, 1986	Sacramento	W 113–102				The Spectrum	23–13
37	January 11, 1986	@ Detroit	W 102–101				Pontiac Silverdome	24–13
38	January 14, 1986	@ New Jersey	W 123–105				Brendan Byrne Arena	25–13
39	January 15, 1986	New Jersey	L 89–123				The Spectrum	25–14
40	January 17, 1986	@ Chicago	W 120–118 (OT)				Chicago Stadium	26–14
41	January 20, 1986	New York	W 103–93				The Spectrum	27–14
42	January 22, 1986	Phoenix	W 118–111				The Spectrum	28–14
43	January 24, 1986	@ Cleveland	W 121–114				Richfield Coliseum	29–14
44	January 26, 1986	@ Boston	L 103–105				Boston Garden	29–15
45	January 28, 1986	@ Seattle	W 106–99				Seattle Center Coliseum	30–15
46	January 29, 1986	@ Utah	L 86–107				Salt Palace Acord Arena	30–16
47	January 31, 1986	@ L.A. Lakers	L 100–134				The Forum	30–17

February: 8–4 (home: 4–2; road: 4–2)

Game	Date	Team	Score	High points	High rebounds	High assists	Location Attendance	Record
48	February 1, 1986	@ Golden State	L 121–125				Oakland-Alameda County Coliseum Arena	30–18
49	February 5, 1986	New Jersey	W 142–107				The Spectrum	31–18
50	February 6, 1986	@ Cleveland	W 111–103				Richfield Coliseum	32–18
All-Star Break
51	February 12, 1986	Chicago	W 106–98				The Spectrum	33–18
52	February 13, 1986	@ New York	W 95–92				Madison Square Garden	34–18
53	February 15, 1986	@ Detroit	L 133–134 (OT)				Pontiac Silverdome	34–19
54	February 17, 1986	Milwaukee	L 106–111				The Spectrum	34–20
55	February 19, 1986	Portland	W 153–133				The Spectrum	35–20
56	February 21, 1986	Washington	W 97–87				The Spectrum	36–20
57	February 23, 1986	L.A. Lakers	L 111–117 (OT)				The Spectrum	36–21
58	February 25, 1986	@ Chicago	W 122–108				Chicago Stadium	37–21
59	February 28, 1986	@ Dallas	W 123–120				Reunion Arena	38–21

March: 11–6 (home: 8–2; road: 3–4)

Game	Date	Team	Score	High points	High rebounds	High assists	Location Attendance	Record
60	March 1, 1986	@ Denver	W 118–107				McNichols Sports Arena	39–21
61	March 4, 1986; 7:30 p.m. EST	@ Atlanta	L 121–128	Malone (35)	Barkley (16)	Barkley, Cheeks (6)	The Omni; 13,315	39–22
62	March 5, 1986; 7:30 p.m. EST	Atlanta	L 114–122 (OT)	Malone (29)	Malone (20)	Cheeks (8)	The Spectrum; 15,192	39–23
63	March 7, 1986	@ Milwaukee	L 95–125				MECCA Arena	39–24
64	March 9, 1986	Indiana	W 120–102				The Spectrum	40–24
65	March 11, 1986	@ Indiana	W 101–91				Market Square Arena	41–24
66	March 12, 1986	New York	W 105–95				The Spectrum	42–24
67	March 14, 1986	Cleveland	W 109–100				The Spectrum	43–24
68	March 16, 1986	@ Boston	L 101–118				Boston Garden	43–25
69	March 17, 1986	@ Cleveland	W 118–112 (OT)				Richfield Coliseum	44–25
70	March 19, 1986	Chicago	W 118–112				The Spectrum	45–25
71	March 21, 1986	Washington	W 112–105				The Spectrum	46–25
72	March 22, 1986	New Jersey	W 123–115				The Spectrum	47–25
73	March 24, 1986	@ Washington	L 93–100				Capital Centre	47–26
74	March 26, 1986; 7:30 p.m. EST	Atlanta	W 112–103	Malone (32)	Barkley (19)	Cheeks (11)	The Spectrum; 14,125	48–26
75	March 28, 1986	Milwaukee	L 94–116				The Spectrum	48–27
76	March 30, 1986	Dallas	W 114–113				The Spectrum	49–27

April: 5–1 (home: 5–0; road: 0–1)

Game	Date	Team	Score	High points	High rebounds	High assists	Location Attendance	Record
77	April 2, 1986	New York	W 93–87				The Spectrum	50–27
78	April 4, 1986	Cleveland	W 122–102				The Spectrum	51–27
79	April 6, 1986	Boston	W 95–94				The Spectrum	52–27
80	April 8, 1986	Detroit	W 116–112				The Spectrum	53–27
81	April 11, 1986	Indiana	W 130–122				The Spectrum	54–27
82	April 13, 1986	@ Washington	L 97–98				Capital Centre	54–28

1985–86 schedule

=== Playoffs ===
1986 playoff game log
First Round: 3–2 (home: 2–1; road: 1–1)

Game	Date	Team	Score	High points	High rebounds	High assists	Location Attendance	Series
1	April 18, 1986	Washington	L 94–95	Charles Barkley (26)	Charles Barkley (22)	Charles Barkley (9)	The Spectrum; 9,148	0–1
2	April 20, 1986	Washington	W 102–97	Charles Barkley (27)	Charles Barkley (20)	Charles Barkley (6)	The Spectrum; 9,057	1–1
3	April 22, 1986	@ Washington	W 91–86	Julius Erving (22)	Charles Barkley (14)	Julius Erving (6)	Capital Centre; 17,137	2–1
4	April 24, 1986	@ Washington	L 111–116	Maurice Cheeks (30)	Charles Barkley (15)	Charles Barkley (7)	Capital Centre; 12,588	2–2
5	April 27, 1986	Washington	W 134–109	Terry Catledge (27)	Charles Barkley (15)	Charles Barkley (12)	The Spectrum; 15,162	3–2

Conference semifinals: 3–4 (home: 2–1; road: 1–3)

Game	Date	Team	Score	High points	High rebounds	High assists	Location Attendance	Series
1	April 29, 1986	@ Milwaukee	W 118–112	Charles Barkley (31)	Charles Barkley (20)	Cheeks, Threatt (7)	MECCA Arena; 11,052	1–0
2	May 1, 1986	@ Milwaukee	L 107–119	Charles Barkley (26)	Charles Barkley (15)	Maurice Cheeks (8)	MECCA Arena; 11,052	1–1
3	May 3, 1986	Milwaukee	W 107–103	Charles Barkley (29)	Charles Barkley (13)	Maurice Cheeks (10)	The Spectrum; 14,611	2–1
4	May 5, 1986	Milwaukee	L 104–109	Charles Barkley (37)	Charles Barkley (14)	Maurice Cheeks (10)	The Spectrum; 17,941	2–2
5	May 7, 1986	@ Milwaukee	L 108–113	Charles Barkley (29)	Clemon Johnson (9)	Barkley, Erving (5)	MECCA Arena; 11,052	2–3
6	May 9, 1986	Milwaukee	W 126–108	Jones, Barkley (23)	Charles Barkley (21)	Maurice Cheeks (13)	The Spectrum; 15,287	3–3
7	May 11, 1986	@ Milwaukee	L 112–113	Sedale Threatt (28)	Charles Barkley (12)	Maurice Cheeks (6)	MECCA Arena; 11,052	3–4

1986 schedule

== Player statistics ==
Legend
GP	Games played	GS	Games started	MPG	Minutes per game
FG%	Field-goal percentage	3P%	3-point field-goal percentage	FT%	Free-throw percentage
RPG	Rebounds per game	APG	Assists per game	SPG	Steals per game
BPG	Blocks per game	PPG	Points per game

== Awards and records ==
- Charles Barkley, All-NBA Second Team
- Maurice Cheeks, NBA All-Defensive First Team

== See also ==
- 1985–86 NBA season
