= Bernard Thompson =

American basketball player (born 1962)

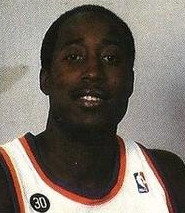
- Thompson in 1987

Personal information
- Born: August 30, 1962 (age 64) Phoenix, Arizona, U.S.
- Listed height: 6 ft 6 in (1.98 m)
- Listed weight: 210 lb (95 kg)

Career information
- High school: South Mountain (Phoenix, Arizona)
- College: Fresno State (1980–1984)
- NBA draft: 1984: 1st round, 19th overall pick
- Drafted by: Portland Trail Blazers
- Playing career: 1984–2001
- Position: Small forward / shooting guard
- Number: 5, 7, 25
- Coaching career: 2001–2008

Career history

Playing
- 1984–1985: Portland Trail Blazers
- 1985–1988: Phoenix Suns
- 1988–1989: Houston Rockets
- 1989: Columbus Horizon
- 1989–1990: Grand Rapids Hoops
- 1990: Rockford Lightning
- 1990–1991: Maccabi Haifa
- 1991–1992: Oklahoma City Cavalry
- 1992–1993: Tokyo Kumajei Gumi
- 1993: Fargo–Moorhead Fever
- 1993–1994: Oklahoma City Cavalry
- 1994: Swift Mighty Meaty Hotdogs
- 1994–1995: TBB Trier
- 1995–1996: Universidad de Concepción
- 1996–2001: TBB Trier

Coaching
- 2001–2003: UC Santa Cruz
- 2002–2004: TBB Trier
- 2005–2008: Arizona Rhinos

Career highlights
- As player: German League Top Scorer (1995); 2× First-team All-PCAA (1983, 1984); Second-team All-PCAA (1982)
- Stats at NBA.com
- Stats at Basketball Reference

Bernard Thompson (born August 30, 1962) is an American former professional basketball player. The 6 ft 7 in (2.01 m) swingman is from Phoenix, Arizona. Thompson played five seasons in the National Basketball Association (NBA), from 1984 to 1989.

== College career ==
After attending South Mountain High School, in Phoenix, Thompson played college basketball for the Fresno State Bulldogs, from 1980 to 1984.

== Professional career ==
Thompson who was selected by the Portland Trail Blazers, in the first round (19th pick overall) of the 1984 NBA draft. Thompson played for the Blazers, Phoenix Suns and Houston Rockets. Thompson's best year as a pro came during the 1985–86 season, as a member of the Suns, as he appeared in 61 games and averaged 8.5 points per game.

After the close of his NBA career, Thompson played four seasons in the Continental Basketball Association (CBA), with the Columbus Horizon, Grand Rapids Hoops, Rockford Lightning, Oklahoma City Cavalry and Fargo-Moorhead Fever. He averaged 18.4 points and 4.7 rebounds per game during his CBA career.

== Coaching career ==
Thompson was the assistant coach of the Arizona Rhinos, of the ABA, for two years.

== Career statistics ==
Legend
GP	Games played	GS	Games started	MPG	Minutes per game
FG%	Field goal percentage	3P%	3-point field goal percentage	FT%	Free throw percentage
RPG	Rebounds per game	APG	Assists per game	SPG	Steals per game
BPG	Blocks per game	PPG	Points per game	**Bold**	Career high

=== NBA ===
==== Regular season ====
Year	Team	GP	GS	MPG	FG%	3P%	FT%	RPG	APG	SPG	BPG	PPG
1984–85	Portland	59	0	9.1	.373	.000	.765	1.3	.9	.5	**.2**	3.3
1985–86	Phoenix	**61**	**20**	**21.0**	**.489**	.000	.809	**2.3**	**2.2**	**.8**	**.2**	**8.5**
1986–87	Phoenix	24	2	13.8	.400	.000	.818	1.3	.8	.5	**.2**	4.6
1987–88	Phoenix	37	7	15.3	.465	.000	.717	2.1	1.2	.6	.0	5.2
1988–89	Houston	23	0	9.7	.339	.000	**.846**	1.2	.6	.6	.0	2.7
Career		204	29	14.4	.439	.000	.789	1.7	1.3	.6	.1	5.3

==== Playoffs ====
Year	Team	GP	GS	MPG	FG%	3P%	FT%	RPG	APG	SPG	BPG	PPG
1985	Portland	2	0	5.0	.000	–	1.000	1.5	1.0	.0	.5	1.0
