= Charles Jones (basketball, born 1962) =

American basketball player (born 1962)

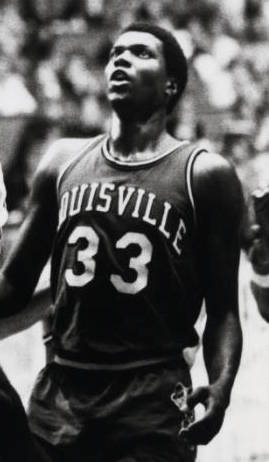
- Jones with the Louisville Cardinals

Personal information
- Born: January 12, 1962 (age 64) Scooba, Mississippi, U.S.
- Listed height: 6 ft 8 in (2.03 m)
- Listed weight: 215 lb (98 kg)

Career information
- High school: East Kemper (Scooba, Mississippi)
- College: Louisville (1980–1984)
- NBA draft: 1984: 2nd round, 36th overall pick
- Drafted by: Phoenix Suns
- Playing career: 1984–1991
- Position: Power forward
- Number: 34, 8, 51

Career history

Playing
- 1984–1986: Phoenix Suns
- 1987–1988: Portland Trail Blazers
- 1988–1989: Washington Bullets
- 1989–1990: Viola Reggio Calabria
- 1990–1991: Kleenex Pistoia

Coaching
- 2020–present: Spalding (women's assistant)

Career highlights
- Mississippi Mr. Basketball (1980)
- Stats at NBA.com
- Stats at Basketball Reference

Charles Alexander Jones (born January 12, 1962) is an American former professional basketball player and current college basketball coach who played for four seasons in the National Basketball Association. Primarily a forward, he played for the Phoenix Suns, Portland Trail Blazers, and Washington Bullets during his NBA career.

Jones was born and raised in Scooba, Mississippi, where he attended East Kemper High School. An outstanding leaper, Jones still holds the rebound record for the Mississippi High School All-Star Game. He grabbed 29 rebounds in the 1980 Mississippi All-Star contest. Jones went on to the University of Louisville from 1980 to 1984, appearing in two Final Fours with the school during his career. He was named the most valuable player in the 1982 Mid-East Regional of the NCAA Tournament held in Birmingham, Alabama. He averaged over eleven points and nearly ten rebounds in his senior year.

In the 1984 NBA draft, Jones was selected in the second round by the Phoenix Suns. As a rookie, he appeared in 78 games, starting 14 of them, while averaging nearly eight-and-a-half points and over five rebounds per game. In his second season, he played in only 43 games, while starting 18 of them, in a season which saw his per-game numbers go down. After the season, he was released by Phoenix.

After not being on a roster during most of the 1986–87 NBA season, Jones was signed to a contract by the Portland Trail Blazers with two games remaining in their season. He did not make an appearance with the Blazers during those final two games, nor during the postseason. He remained on the Blazers' roster for the 1987–88 season, but appeared sparingly, averaging only five minutes per game. At the end of the season, Portland released Jones.

In October 1988, Jones signed a contract with the Washington Bullets. To avoid confusion with the Bullets' starting center also named Charles Jones, he was known as Charles A. Jones while in Washington. He was waived at the end of the preseason, but was re-signed in December. As a Bullet, he appeared in 43 games, primarily serving as the team's 12th man. After a season in Washington, he went to Europe and played two seasons of basketball in Italy before retiring from the sport.

After retiring from basketball, Jones moved to the Louisville area and became an officer with the Louisville Metro Police Department.

Following his 2019 retirement from the LMPD, Jones took a position as a security officer with Spalding University, a small Catholic school in Louisville. In 2020, he took a second position as an assistant coach of Spalding's women's basketball team. According to a 2021 story published by local TV station WDRB, Jones was recruited "not so subtly" by newly hired Spalding head coach Kylee Gorby, who recalled telling Jones, "I came over there one day with some women’s basketball gear and some paperwork and I said, 'Hey, no pressure at all, but these shirts are yours regardless, and here’s the paperwork.'" Jones himself told WDRB, "I think ... probably after the 10th or 12th time (she asked), I said, I’ll do it." He would add in the interview, "The game has changed. It’s not the same game that I played, especially playing at the level I played. I’m not saying this is not a good level. It’s just different. I had been away from it for awhile, so it took a little getting used to being out there. But I enjoy it."

== Career statistics ==
Legend
GP	Games played	GS	Games started	MPG	Minutes per game
FG%	Field goal percentage	3P%	3-point field goal percentage	FT%	Free throw percentage
RPG	Rebounds per game	APG	Assists per game	SPG	Steals per game
BPG	Blocks per game	PPG	Points per game	**Bold**	Career high

=== NBA ===
==== Regular season ====
Year	Team	GP	GS	MPG	FG%	3P%	FT%	RPG	APG	SPG	BPG	PPG
1984–85	Phoenix	**78**	14	**20.1**	**.520**	.000	**.648**	**5.1**	**1.6**	.6	**.8**	**8.4**
1985–86	Phoenix	43	**18**	17.3	.457	.000	.510	4.5	1.2	**.7**	.6	4.7
1987–88	Portland	37	0	5.0	.400	.000	.576	.8	.2	.1	.2	1.4
1988–89	Washington	43	0	12.0	.463	**.333**	.623	3.3	.4	.4	.4	2.6
Career		201	32	15.0	.493	.111	.611	3.8	1.0	.5	.5	5.0

==== Playoffs ====
Year	Team	GP	GS	MPG	FG%	3P%	FT%	RPG	APG	SPG	BPG	PPG
1985	Phoenix	**2**	0	**17.0**	**.600**	–	**1.000**	**1.5**	**1.5**	.0	**1.5**	**6.0**
1988	Portland	**2**	0	1.0	.000	–	–	.5	.0	.0	.0	.0
Career		4	0	9.0	.500	–	1.000	1.0	.8	.0	.8	3.0
