= Ron Anderson (basketball, born 1958) =

American basketball player

Personal information
- Born: October 15, 1958 (age 68) Chicago, Illinois, U.S.
- Listed height: 6 ft 7 in (2.01 m)
- Listed weight: 215 lb (98 kg)

Career information
- High school: Bowen (Chicago, Illinois)
- College: Santa Barbara CC (1980–1982); Fresno State (1982–1984)
- NBA draft: 1984: 2nd round, 27th overall pick
- Drafted by: Cleveland Cavaliers
- Playing career: 1984–2010
- Position: Small forward
- Number: 25, 15, 20, 35

Career history
- 1984–1985: Cleveland Cavaliers
- 1985–1988: Indiana Pacers
- 1988–1993: Philadelphia 76ers
- 1993: New Jersey Nets
- 1993–1994: Rochester Renegade
- 1994: Washington Bullets
- 1994–1995: Montpellier Basket
- 1995–1996: Maccabi Tel Aviv
- 1996: Atlantic City Seagulls
- 1996–1997: Le Mans Sarthe Basket
- 1997–1999: Montpellier Basket
- 1999–2010: La Séguinière

Career highlights
- LNB Pro A Best Scorer (1995); First-team All-PCAA (1984); Second-team All-PCAA (1983); NM3 winner (2003)

Career NBA statistics
- Points: 7,056 (10.6 ppg)
- Rebounds: 2,312 (3.5 rpg)
- Assists: 952 (1.4 apg)
- Stats at NBA.com
- Stats at Basketball Reference

Ronald Gene Anderson (born October 15, 1958) is an American former professional basketball player, best known for his spell with the National Basketball Association's Philadelphia 76ers. Following his NBA career, he moved to France where he continued to play until the age of 52.

== College career ==
Listed at 6'7", and playing as a guard-forward, Anderson, after graduating from Chicago's Bowen High School, played college basketball for the Fresno State Bulldogs, after beginning at Santa Barbara City College.

== Professional career ==
Anderson was selected by the Cleveland Cavaliers, in the second round of the 1984 NBA draft. Although he played the normal four years in college, and immediately started playing in the league, Anderson arrived there at age 26. He spent ten seasons (1984–1994) playing with the Cavaliers in which he would be the last Cavalier to wear #25 before Mark Price in which was retired in honor of, Indiana Pacers, Philadelphia 76ers, New Jersey Nets and Washington Bullets (he split 1993–94 between these two teams, appearing for the Continental Basketball Association's Rochester Renegade in between).

Having had his best years with the Sixers, playing alongside Charles Barkley, he scored in double figures four of the five seasons he spent in Philadelphia, with a best output of 16.2 points per game in 1988–89. Anderson finished his NBA career with totals of 7,056 points (10.6 average), 2,312 rebounds (3.5) and 952 assists (1.4). He played at a top level until the age of 41, successively representing Montpellier Basket (1994–95, 1997–99), Maccabi Tel Aviv (1995–96), Le Mans SB (1996–97) and Angers BC 49 in the French and Israeli professional leagues. He also played with the Atlantic City Seagulls during 1995–96. He was the top scorer in France's Pro A top division in 1995. Injury and a failed knee operation while playing for Maccabi slowed him down subsequently.

Anderson settled, got married and started a family in France. He continued to play semi-professionally with the basketball team of La Séguinière, helping that team win the Nationale Masculine 3 in 2003 and subsequently playing in the Nationale Masculine 2. In 2009, Anderson was inducted into the Fresno County Athletic Hall of Fame. At age 51, he scored 23 points in a game against Tourcoing in league play of France's second division. At age 52, he announced his final retirement on November 16, 2010, with his team sending him off at a last home game on November 27, 2010.

== NBA career statistics ==
Legend
GP	Games played	GS	Games started	MPG	Minutes per game
FG%	Field goal percentage	3P%	3-point field goal percentage	FT%	Free throw percentage
RPG	Rebounds per game	APG	Assists per game	SPG	Steals per game
BPG	Blocks per game	PPG	Points per game	**Bold**	Career high

=== Regular season ===
Year	Team	GP	GS	MPG	FG%	3P%	FT%	RPG	APG	SPG	BPG	PPG
1984–85	Cleveland	36	7	14.4	.431	**.500**	.820	2.4	0.9	0.3	0.2	5.8
1985–86	Cleveland	17	3	12.2	**.500**	.000	.750	1.5	0.5	0.1	0.0	5.1
1985–86	Indiana	60	**27**	24.5	.493	.250	.658	4.1	**2.3**	0.9	0.1	10.4
1986–87	Indiana	63	0	11.4	.473	.000	.787	2.4	0.9	0.5	0.0	5.8
1987–88	Indiana	74	1	14.8	.498	.000	.766	2.9	1.1	0.6	0.1	7.3
1988–89	Philadelphia	**82**	12	**31.9**	.491	.182	.856	**5.0**	1.7	0.9	**0.3**	**16.2**
1989–90	Philadelphia	78	3	26.8	.451	.143	.838	3.8	1.8	0.9	0.2	11.9
1990–91	Philadelphia	**82**	13	28.5	.485	.209	.833	4.5	1.4	0.8	0.2	14.6
1991–92	Philadelphia	**82**	11	29.7	.465	.331	**.877**	3.4	1.6	**1.0**	0.1	13.7
1992–93	Philadelphia	69	0	18.3	.414	.325	.809	2.7	1.3	0.4	0.1	8.1
1993–94	New Jersey	11	2	16.0	.349	.333	.833	2.4	0.5	0.5	0.2	4.0
1993–94	Washington	10	0	18.0	.465	.214	.818	2.7	1.1	0.3	0.1	5.2
Career		664	79	22.8	.471	.287	.814	3.5	1.4	0.7	0.1	10.6

=== Playoffs ===
Year	Team	GP	GS	MPG	FG%	3P%	FT%	RPG	APG	SPG	BPG	PPG
1985	Cleveland	2	0	4.5	.000	–	–	1.5	0.0	0.0	0.0	0.0
1987	Indiana	4	0	6.0	.500	–	–	0.8	0.0	0.0	0.0	1.0
1989	Philadelphia	3	0	**36.3**	**.569**	.000	.800	**5.3**	**4.3**	0.3	**0.7**	**20.7**
1990	Philadelphia	**10**	0	25.6	.430	**.600**	**.967**	3.7	1.4	0.4	0.0	11.2
1991	Philadelphia	8	0	27.9	.398	.200	.895	2.6	2.4	**0.8**	0.0	11.0
Career		27	0	23.0	.444	.364	.926	3.0	1.7	0.4	0.1	9.9

== Personal life ==
His son Ron Anderson Jr. played for South Florida for the 2010–11 and 2011–12 seasons, after transferring from Kansas State, and later professionally in France.
