= 1985–86 Cleveland Cavaliers season =

NBA professional basketball team season

- Head coach: George Karl (fired); Gene Littles (interim)
- General manager: Harry Weltman
- Owners: Gordon Gund; George Gund III
- Arena: Coliseum at Richfield

Results
- Record: 29–53 (.354)
- Place: Division: 5th (Central); Conference: 9th (Eastern)
- Playoff finish: Did not qualify
- Stats at Basketball Reference

Local media
- Television: WUAB
- Radio: WWWE

The 1985–86 Cleveland Cavaliers season was the Cavaliers' 16th season in the NBA.

The season saw the team draft Charles Oakley and John "Hot Rod" Williams with the 9th and 45th picks in the 1985 NBA draft, respectively. Oakley's draft rights were traded to the Chicago Bulls. Williams played in the United States Basketball League during the 1986 season, as he was unable to play in the NBA due to a trial in which he was charged for sports bribery and conspiracy. However, Williams would later spend nine seasons with the Cavaliers franchise starting in the 1986–87 season.

The Cavaliers finished the season with a 29–53 record, missing the playoffs.

== NBA draft ==
Round	Pick	Player	Position	Nationality	School/Club team
1	9	Charles Oakley	PF/C	United States	Virginia Union
2	30	Calvin Duncan		United States	Virginia Commonwealth
2	45	Hot Rod Williams	PF/C	United States	Tulane
3	55	Herb Johnson	PF/C	United States	Tulsa
4	79	Mark Davis	F	United States	Old Dominion
5	101	Gunther Behnke		Germany	
6	125	Ricky Johnson		United States	Illinois State
7	147	Buzz Peterson		United States	North Carolina

== Roster ==
1985–86 Cleveland Cavaliers roster
Players

Pos.	No.	Player	Height	Weight	DOB	From
PG	5	John Bagley	6 ft 0 in (1.83 m)	185 lb (84 kg)	1960-04-23	Boston College
SG	10	Ron Brewer	6 ft 4 in (1.93 m)	180 lb (82 kg)	1955-07-16	Arkansas
SG	21	World B. Free	6 ft 2 in (1.88 m)	185 lb (84 kg)	1953-12-09	Guilford
SF	32	Roy Hinson	6 ft 9 in (2.06 m)	210 lb (95 kg)	1961-05-02	Rutgers
SF	35	Phil Hubbard	6 ft 8 in (2.03 m)	215 lb (98 kg)	1956-12-13	Michigan
SG	3	Eddie Johnson, Jr.	6 ft 2 in (1.88 m)	180 lb (82 kg)	1955-02-24	Auburn
PF	44	Edgar Jones	6 ft 10 in (2.08 m)	225 lb (102 kg)	1956-06-17	Nevada
PF	24	Keith Lee	6 ft 10 in (2.08 m)	215 lb (98 kg)	1962-12-28	Memphis
SF	33	Ben McDonald	6 ft 8 in (2.03 m)	210 lb (95 kg)	1962-07-20	UC Irvine
PG	14	Dirk Minniefield	6 ft 3 in (1.91 m)	180 lb (82 kg)	1961-01-17	Kentucky
PF	50	Ben Poquette	6 ft 9 in (2.06 m)	235 lb (107 kg)	1955-05-07	Central Michigan
PF	8	Lonnie Shelton	6 ft 8 in (2.03 m)	240 lb (109 kg)	1955-10-19	Oregon State
C	54	Melvin Turpin	6 ft 11 in (2.11 m)	240 lb (109 kg)	1960-12-28	Kentucky
C	41	Mark West	6 ft 10 in (2.08 m)	230 lb (104 kg)	1960-11-05	Old Dominion

Coaches
Head coach
- George Karl (fired)
- Gene Littles (interim)
Assistant(s)
- Herman Kull
- Morris McHone

Legend
- (DP) Unsigned draft pick
- (FA) Free agent
- (S) Suspended
- Injured

Roster
Updated: March 16, 1986

== Regular season ==
Central Division	W	L	PCT	GB	Home	Road	Div
y-Milwaukee Bucks	57	25	.695	–	33–8	24–17	21–9
x-Atlanta Hawks	50	32	.610	7	34–7	16–25	21–9
x-Detroit Pistons	46	36	.561	11	31–10	15–26	18–12
x-Chicago Bulls	30	52	.366	27	22–19	8–33	10–20
Cleveland Cavaliers	29	53	.354	28	16–25	13–28	10–19
Indiana Pacers	26	56	.317	31	19–22	7–34	9–20

#	Eastern Conference				
#	Team	W	L	PCT	GB
1	z-Boston Celtics	67	15	.817	–
2	y-Milwaukee Bucks	57	25	.695	10
3	x-Philadelphia 76ers	54	28	.659	13
4	x-Atlanta Hawks	50	32	.610	17
5	x-Detroit Pistons	46	36	.561	21
6	x-Washington Bullets	39	43	.476	28
7	x-New Jersey Nets	39	43	.476	28
8	x-Chicago Bulls	30	52	.366	37
9	Cleveland Cavaliers	29	53	.354	38
10	Indiana Pacers	26	56	.317	41
11	New York Knicks	23	59	.280	44

Notes
z - clinched division title
y - clinched division title
x - clinched playoff spot

=== Game log ===
1985–86 game log
Total: 29–53 (Home: 16–25; Road: 13–28)
October: 1–3 (home: 0–2; road: 1–1)

Game	Date	Team	Score	High points	High rebounds	High assists	Location Attendance	Record
1	October 25, 1985	@ Chicago						
2	October 26, 1985	Boston						

November: 6–7 (home: 2–3; road: 4–4)

Game	Date	Team	Score	High points	High rebounds	High assists	Location Attendance	Record
11	November 16, 1985	@ Chicago						
12	November 19, 1985	Golden State						
15	November 24, 1985	Atlanta	W 98–90				Coliseum at Richfield; 6,145	6–9
16	November 26, 1985	@ Detroit						

December: 7–8 (home: 4–6; road: 3–2)

Game	Date	Team	Score	High points	High rebounds	High assists	Location Attendance	Record
20	December 7, 1985	Denver						
21	December 10, 1985	Detroit						
24	December 14, 1985	Boston						
25	December 17, 1985	Houston						
28	December 22, 1985	Dallas						
30	December 27, 1985	@ Detroit						
32	December 30, 1985	Chicago						

January: 4–11 (home: 4–3; road: 0–8)

Game	Date	Team	Score	High points	High rebounds	High assists	Location Attendance	Record
36	January 8, 1986	@ Boston						
39	January 16, 1986	@ Atlanta	L 99–116				The Omni; 4,961	16–23
42	January 22, 1986	Detroit						
44	January 27, 1986	@ Denver						
45	January 28, 1986	@ Houston						
47	January 31, 1986	@ Dallas						

February: 5–7 (home: 4–4; road: 1–3)

Game	Date	Team	Score	High points	High rebounds	High assists	Location Attendance	Record
48	February 4, 1986	Atlanta	L 104–105				Coliseum at Richfield; 6,702	18–30
55	February 20, 1986	Detroit						
58	February 26, 1986	@ Atlanta	L 109–129				The Omni; 6,504	23–35
59	February 28, 1986	@ Chicago						

March: 5–10 (home: 1–5; road: 4–5)

Game	Date	Team	Score	High points	High rebounds	High assists	Location Attendance	Record
63	March 8, 1986	@ Golden State						
69	March 18, 1986	vs. Boston (at Hartford, CT)						
71	March 22, 1986	Chicago						
72	March 25, 1986	Atlanta	L 91–97				Coliseum at Richfield; 7,178	26–46
74	March 29, 1986	@ Atlanta	W 123–105				The Omni; 9,056	28–46

April: 1–7 (home: 1–2; road: 0–5)

Game	Date	Team	Score	High points	High rebounds	High assists	Location Attendance	Record
75	April 1, 1986	Boston						
79	April 7, 1986	@ Detroit						
81	April 11, 1986	@ Boston						
82	April 13, 1986	Chicago						

1985–86 schedule

== Player stats ==
Legend
GP	Games played	GS	Games started	MPG	Minutes per game
FG%	Field-goal percentage	3P%	3-point field-goal percentage	FT%	Free-throw percentage
RPG	Rebounds per game	APG	Assists per game	SPG	Steals per game
BPG	Blocks per game	PPG	Points per game

Player	GP	GS	MPG	FG%	3FG%	FT%	RPG	APG	SPG	BPG	PPG
World B. Free	75	75	33.8	45.5	42.0	78.0	2.9	4.2	1.2	0.3	23.4
Roy Hinson	82	82	34.6	53.2	0.0	71.9	7.8	1.2	0.8	1.4	19.6
Melvin Turpin	80	69	28.7	54.4	0.0	81.1	7.0	0.7	0.8	1.3	13.7
John Bagley	78	77	31.7	42.3	24.3	79.1	3.5	9.4	1.6	0.1	11.7
Phil Hubbard	23	21	27.8	47.0	0.0	67.9	5.2	1.3	0.9	0.1	11.4
Eddie Johnson	32	4	19.2	44.0	36.9	73.3	1.4	3.6	0.3	0.0	9.8
Edgar Jones	53	6	19.1	50.5	30.4	74.2	3.9	0.8	0.6	0.7	9.7
Keith Lee	58	38	20.6	46.6	22.2	78.1	6.1	1.2	0.5	0.6	7.4
Johnny Davis	39	0	15.7	43.0	18.2	84.8	0.9	2.7	0.6	0.1	7.0
Dirk Minniefield	76	2	14.9	48.1	27.0	78.5	1.7	3.5	0.9	0.0	5.5
Ron Brewer	40	3	13.8	38.6	29.4	89.2	1.3	1.0	0.4	0.2	5.1
Ron Anderson	17	3	12.2	50.0	0.0	75.0	1.5	0.5	0.1	0.0	5.1
Ben Poquette	81	3	18.5	47.7	20.0	72.0	4.6	1.0	0.4	0.4	5.0
Lonnie Shelton	44	1	15.5	48.9	0.0	87.5	3.3	1.4	0.5	0.1	4.5
Mark West	67	26	17.5	54.1	0.0	52.4	4.8	0.3	0.4	0.9	4.2
Ben McDonald	21	0	12.7	48.3	0.0	62.5	1.8	0.4	0.3	0.0	2.9
Ennis Whatley	8	0	8.3	47.4	0.0	57.1	0.9	1.6	0.6	0.0	2.8

Player statistics citation:

== Transactions ==
=== Trades ===
June 18, 1985 (Draft day)	To Cleveland Cavaliers Draft rights to Keith Lee; Ennis Whatley	To Chicago Bulls Draft rights to Charles Oakley; Draft rights to Calvin Duncan
December 10, 1985	To Cleveland Cavaliers 1987 fourth-round pick	To Indiana Pacers Ron Anderson
February 10, 1986	To Cleveland Cavaliers Eddie Johnson	To Atlanta Hawks Johnny Davis
June 16, 1986	To Cleveland Cavaliers 1986 first-round pick	To Philadelphia 76ers Roy Hinson; Cash considerations

=== Free agents ===
Additions
Player	Date signed	Former team
Derrick Rowland	September 5	N/A
Dirk Minniefield	September 11	Louisville Catbirds (CBA)
Ron Brewer	January 11	Chicago Bulls
Ben McDonald	March 4	Magia Huesca (Spain)

Subtractions
Player	Reason Left	New team
Mark Davis	Waived	Pensacola Tornados (CBA)
Kevin Williams	Waived	Tampa Bay Thrillers (CBA)
Derrick Rowland	Waived	Milwaukee Bucks
Ennis Whatley	Waived	Washington Bullets
