= Craig Hodges =

American basketball player-coach (born 1960)

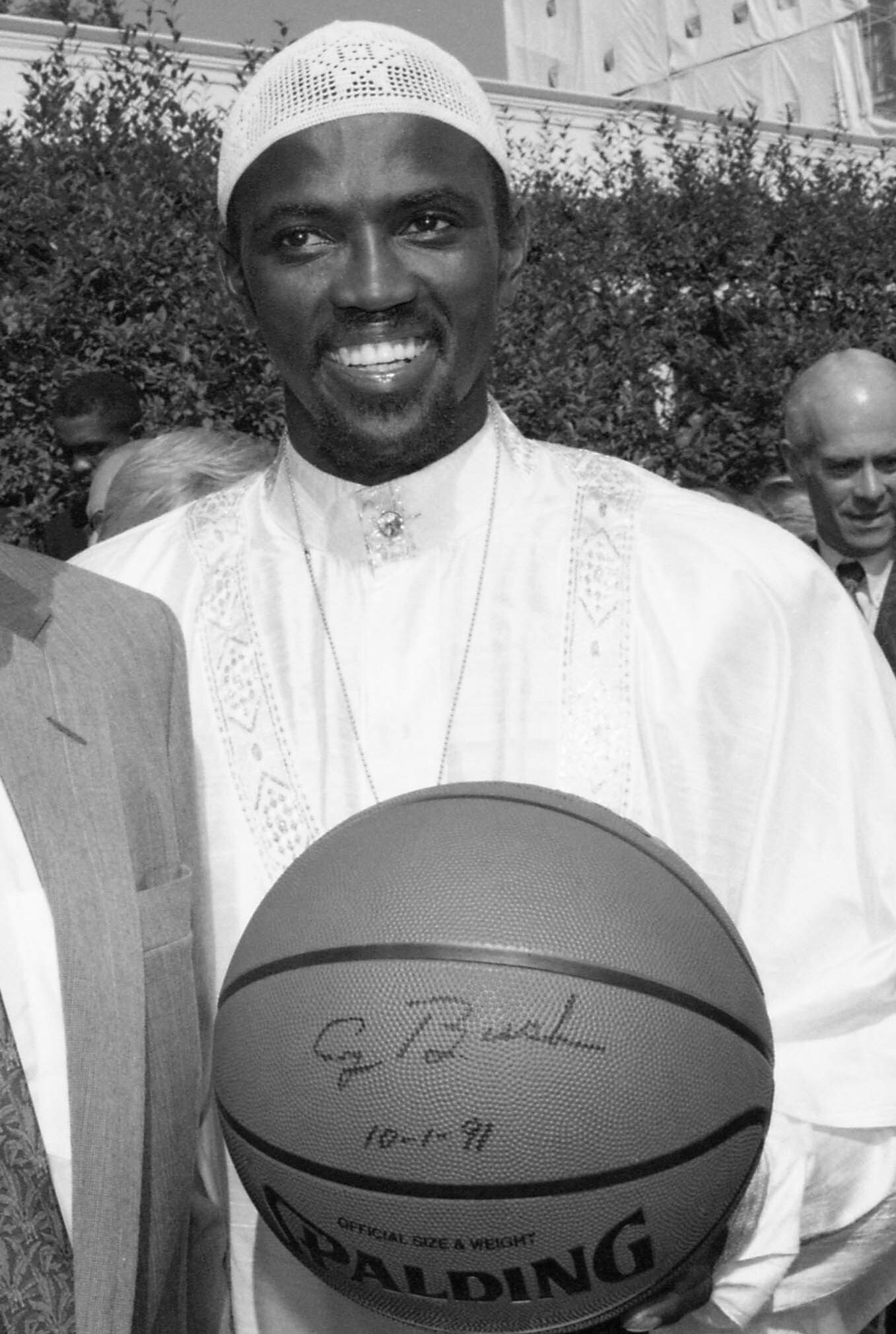
- Hodges in 1991

Personal information
- Born: June 27, 1960 (age 66) Park Forest, Illinois, U.S.
- Listed height: 6 ft 2 in (1.88 m)
- Listed weight: 190 lb (86 kg)

Career information
- High school: Rich East (Park Forest, Illinois)
- College: Long Beach State (1978–1982)
- NBA draft: 1982: 3rd round, 48th overall pick
- Drafted by: San Diego Clippers
- Playing career: 1982–1998
- Position: Shooting guard / point guard
- Number: 24, 15, 25, 14
- Coaching career: 1994–present

Career history

Playing
- 1982–1984: San Diego Clippers
- 1984–1988: Milwaukee Bucks
- 1988: Phoenix Suns (Note: Hodges played in parts of two seasons in Phoenix, but only during the 1988 calendar year. He was traded from Milwaukee on February 25, 1988, during the 1987–88 season, and traded to Chicago on December 14, 1988, during the 1988–89 season.)
- 1988–1992: Chicago Bulls
- 1993: Shampoo Clear Cantù
- 1994–1995: Galatasaray
- 1995–1996: Rockford Lightning
- 1997–1998: Jämtland Ambassadors Östersund

Career highlights
- As player: 2× NBA champion (1991, 1992); 3× NBA Three-Point Contest champion (1990–1992); Turkish Cup champion (1995); First-team All-PCAA (1982); As assistant coach: 2× NBA champion (2009, 2010)

Career NBA statistics
- Points: 5,940 (8.5 ppg)
- Rebounds: 937 (1.3 rpg)
- Assists: 1,769 (2.5 apg)
- Stats at NBA.com
- Stats at Basketball Reference

Craig Anthony Hodges (born June 27, 1960) is an American former professional basketball player and former head coach of the Westchester Knicks of the NBA Development League. He played in the NBA for 10 seasons and is one of only 6 players to lead the league in 3-point shooting percentage multiple times. He won two NBA championships with the Chicago Bulls and, along with Larry Bird and Damian Lillard, is one of only three players to win three Three Point Contests at the National Basketball Association All-Star Weekend, winning the competition in 1990, 1991, and 1992. Hodges also holds the Three Point Contest records for the most consecutive shots made with 19, set in 1991, and the most points scored in a single round at 25, set in 1986. He was later a head coach at Chicago State University, an assistant coach for the Los Angeles Lakers and head coach of the Halifax Rainmen of the National Basketball League of Canada. A political activist, he called on other players to use their fame to advance political causes.

== Playing career ==
Born in Park Forest, Illinois, Hodges played college basketball at Long Beach State from 1978 to 1982. He played under Tex Winter, who later coached him again as an assistant to Phil Jackson with the Chicago Bulls.

During his career in the NBA, Hodges played for the San Diego Clippers, Milwaukee Bucks, Phoenix Suns, and Chicago Bulls. On December 12, 1985, Hodges led the Bucks in scoring with a career high 29 points, including a 27-foot three-point jump shot to force the game into overtime, in a 110–108 loss to the Washington Bullets. That postseason, Hodges played a key role in the Bucks advancing past the Philadelphia 76ers in the Eastern Conference Semifinals, averaging 14.1 points, 4.6 assists, and 3.3 steals per game during the seven-game series, which included 24 points and the game-winning basket in game seven. The following round, in a pattern familiar for the 1980s Bucks, the team would ultimately fall short of reaching the NBA Finals, being eliminated by the Boston Celtics. Hodges then played for the Bulls from 1988 to 1992, and helped them win two NBA Championships in 1991 and 1992. He was waived by the Bulls after the 1991–92 season.

After sitting out the NBA season, he played a season with Clear Cantù in the Italian league.

=== Three Point Contest ===
Hodges appeared in the first eight NBA All-Star Three Point Contests from 1986 to 1993, and won the contest three times, in 1990, 1991, and 1992. He reached the final round on two other occasions, in 1986 when he lost to Larry Bird, and in 1989, when he lost to Dale Ellis.

Hodges holds the Three Point Contest records for the most consecutive shots made with 19 (1991) and is tied with Jason Kapono for most points scored in a single round at 25 (1986). He is tied with Hubert Davis for the highest score in the semifinal round at 24 (1991) and with six other players for the most bonus balls made with five (1989). Hodges has the second highest three-round combined score with 61 (1991).

Hodges competed in the Three Point Contest at the 1993 NBA All-Star Weekend as a free agent after he was waived by the Bulls in 1992 and did not sign with an NBA team for the 1992–93 season. The NBA initially left him off the field of contestants as he was not on an NBA roster at the time, but eventually allowed him to defend his 1992 title. Hodges wore a generic "NBA" jersey in the contest. Hodges was eliminated after the semifinal, finishing behind eventual winner Mark Price and Terry Porter.

Career Three Point Contest record

- 1986: Runner-up
- 1987: First round
- 1988: First round
- 1989: Runner-up
- 1990: Winner
- 1991: Winner
- 1992: Winner
- 1993: Semi-finalist

== NBA career statistics ==
Legend
GP	Games played	GS	Games started	MPG	Minutes per game
FG%	Field goal percentage	3P%	3-point field goal percentage	FT%	Free throw percentage
RPG	Rebounds per game	APG	Assists per game	SPG	Steals per game
BPG	Blocks per game	PPG	Points per game	**Bold**	Career high
†	Won an NBA championship	*	Led the league

=== Regular season ===
Year	Team	GP	GS	MPG	FG%	3P%	FT%	RPG	APG	SPG	BPG	PPG
1982–83	San Diego	76	48	26.6	.452	.222	.723	1.6	3.6	1.1	**0.1**	9.9
1983–84	San Diego	76	28	20.7	.450	.217	.750	1.1	1.5	0.8	0.0	7.8
1984–85	Milwaukee	**82***	63	**30.4**	.490	.348	.815	**2.3**	**4.3**	**1.2**	0.0	10.6
1985–86	Milwaukee	66	**66**	26.3	**.500**	.451*	.872	1.8	3.5	1.1	0.0	**10.8**
1986–87	Milwaukee	78	43	27.5	.462	.373	.891	1.8	3.1	1.0	**0.1**	**10.8**
1987–88	Milwaukee	43	0	22.9	.449	.466*	.821	1.1	2.5	0.7	0.0	9.2
1987–88	Phoenix	23	0	20.1	.489	**.544***	.844	1.4	1.9	0.7	**0.1**	10.1
1988–89	Phoenix	10	0	9.2	.444	.333	.750	0.5	0.8	0.2	0.0	3.9
1988–89	Chicago	49	6	22.7	.475	.423	.849	1.7	2.8	0.8	**0.1**	10.0
1989–90	Chicago	63	0	16.7	.438	.481	.909	0.8	1.7	0.5	0.0	6.5
1990–91†	Chicago	73	0	11.5	.424	.383	**.963**	0.6	1.3	0.5	0.0	5.0
1991–92†	Chicago	56	2	9.9	.384	.375	.941	0.4	1.0	0.3	0.0	4.3
Career		695	256	21.7	.461	.400	.828	1.3	2.5	0.8	0.0	8.5

=== Playoffs ===
Year	Team	GP	GS	MPG	FG%	3P%	FT%	RPG	APG	SPG	BPG	PPG
1984–85	Milwaukee	8	8	27.0	.364	.174	.800	1.6	3.3	1.5	0.1	8.0
1985–86	Milwaukee	14	14	**32.9**	.510	**.452**	.794	**1.8**	**4.5**	**2.3**	0.1	**13.5**
1986–87	Milwaukee	12	0	18.8	**.519**	.294	**.909**	**1.8**	1.7	0.8	**0.2**	7.9
1988–89	Chicago	**17***	**17**	32.6	.412	.398	.714	1.5	3.6	1.3	**0.2**	11.2
1989–90	Chicago	16	1	15.9	.378	.293	.750	1.1	1.1	0.3	0.0	4.4
1990–91†	Chicago	**17**	0	12.3	.423	.393	.750	0.2	0.6	0.6	0.0	4.7
1991–92†	Chicago	**17**	0	8.1	.390	.450	.500	0.2	0.3	0.3	0.0	2.5
Career		101	40	20.4	.436	.363	.784	1.1	2.0	0.9	0.1	7.2

== Coaching career ==
From 1994 to 1996, Hodges coached college basketball at Chicago State University, and was fired in 1996 with a win–loss record of 8–51 over two-plus seasons.

In September 2005, Hodges joined the Los Angeles Lakers as a special assistant coach under his former Bulls coach, Phil Jackson. He worked with individual players on offensive skills, primarily shooting. Jackson retired after the 2010–11 season, and Hodges' contract with the Lakers expired as well. Hodges also coached the Halifax Rainmen in the Canadian Basketball League for half a season, and during his time as head coach of the Rainmen, was invited by Dennis Rodman to play in North Korea, but he was denied entry into that country, citing "I was looking forward to the opportunity of going and helping Dennis, as far as the basketball end of things", and saying "I'm for human rights, and so going to North Korea wasn't a matter of me going to rub political shoulders with the man that's in power. It was as a goodwill gesture, as a brotherhood — a brotherhood of sport,"

After serving as an assistant coach for the Westchester Knicks during the 2014–15 D-League season, he was named the team's interim coach for the final four games of the season on March 30, 2015, after head coach Kevin Whitted was fired.

Hodges is currently head coach of Rich East High School in his hometown of Park Forest, Illinois.

== Political activism ==
External videos
- Interview with Hodges on his book Long Shot: The Struggles and Triumphs of an NBA Freedom Fighter, May 13, 2016, C-SPAN

When the Chicago Bulls visited the White House after winning the 1991 NBA Championship, Hodges dressed in a dashiki and delivered a hand-written letter addressed to then-President George H. W. Bush, urging his administration to re-examine its approach toward African Americans. The book The Jordan Rules relates how Hodges opposed the Gulf War but mainly discussed his issues with teammates and coaches, who mostly disagreed with him but did not shun him for his views.

Hodges also criticized his Bulls teammate Michael Jordan for not using his fame to draw attention to social and political issues, and said Jordan was "bailing out" for not being politically outspoken. In a 2022 podcast series on The Ringer hosted by Jackie MacMullan that covered "NBA Icons", MacMullan quoted Hodges as having asked Jordan to leave Nike and form a new athletic-wear company that would be staffed by minorities, and also that Hodges asked Jordan and Magic Johnson to lead a boycott of the 1991 NBA Finals to protest the beating of Rodney King by the LAPD. Jordan ignored the former call and bluntly told Hodges (along with Magic) that the boycott idea was a non-starter.

In 1996, Hodges filed an unsuccessful $40 million lawsuit against the NBA and its then 29 teams, claiming they blackballed him for his association with Louis Farrakhan and criticism of "African-American professional athletes who failed to use their considerable wealth and influence to assist the poor and disenfranchised." The lawsuit claimed that Bulls assistant coach Jim Cleamons told him that the team was troubled by his criticism of players' lack of involvement in inner-city communities. The suit also claimed Billy McKinney, the director of player personnel for the Seattle SuperSonics, initially showed interest in Hodges in 1992, and then shortly after backed away, telling Hodges he could do nothing because "brothers have families, if you know what I mean." While a Bulls official said Hodges was waived as he was getting old and could not play defense, head coach Phil Jackson said:

"I also found it strange that not a single team called to inquire about him. Usually, I get at least one call about a player we've decided not to sign. And yes, he couldn't play much defense, but a lot of guys in the league can't, but not many can shoot from his range, either."

In 2014, Hodges was named to a team assembled by Dennis Rodman as part of his "basketball diplomacy" effort in North Korea with the job of playing an exhibition match against the North Korea men's national basketball team to celebrate the birthday of Kim Jong-Un. He failed to make it into the country as his flight from Canada to Beijing was delayed, causing him to miss the connecting flight to Pyongyang and prompting the Chinese government to send him immediately back to Canada.

Hodges is the father of Jamaal, Noah (who is an actor, golfer and musician) and Jibril (who also played at Long Beach State).
