= Derrick Rowland =

American basketball player and coach

Albany Patroons
- Title: Head coach
- League: TBL

Personal information
- Born: July 21, 1959 (age 67) Brookhaven, New York, U.S.
- Listed height: 6 ft 5 in (1.96 m)
- Listed weight: 195 lb (88 kg)

Career information
- High school: Brentwood (Brentwood, New York)
- College: SUNY Potsdam (1977–1981)
- NBA draft: 1981: 10th round, 211th overall pick
- Drafted by: Denver Nuggets
- Playing career: 1981–1992
- Position: Shooting guard
- Number: 12
- Coaching career: 2006–present

Career history

Playing
- 1981–1982: Rochester Zeniths
- 1982–1989: Albany Patroons
- 1986: Milwaukee Bucks
- 1991: Long Island Surf
- 1991–1992: Albany Patroons

Coaching
- 2006–2007: Albany Patroons
- 2007–2008: Rio Grande Valley Silverados
- 2008–2009: Albany Patroons

Career highlights
- French League Best Scorer (1990); 2× CBA champion (1984, 1988); All-CBA Second Team (1986); CBA All-Defensive Team (1988); CBA All-Defensive First Team (1987); 2× CBA All-Defensive Second Team (1985, 1986)
- Stats at NBA.com
- Stats at Basketball Reference

Derrick Rowland (born June 21, 1959) is a retired American professional basketball player who is in his second stint as the head coach of the Albany Patroons of The Basketball League (TBL). He previously worked as the head coach of the Potawatomi Fire of TBL in the Fire's inaugural season (2022). Born in Brookhaven, New York, during his playing career, he was a 6'5" tall, 195-pound shooting guard.

== College career ==
Rowland completed college at State University of New York at Potsdam. He averaged 18.7 points and 8.8 rebounds to power Potsdam State to the NCAA Division III championship during the 1980–81 season.

== Professional career ==
Rowland was picked in the tenth round of the 1981 NBA draft by the Denver Nuggets, in the National Basketball Association (NBA) draft. When he failed to make the Denver lineup, Rowland drifted to the Continental League, where he played for the Albany Patroons, for seven years. He won CBA championships with the Patroons in 1984 and 1988. He was selected to the All-CBA Second Team in 1986, All-Defensive Team in 1988, All-Defensive First Team in 1987 and All-Defensive Second Team in 1985.

In 1981–82, Rowland averaged 7.3 points for the Rochester Zeniths, and was cut the next campaign, after playing only four games with the Albany club. In March 1986, he was signed by the Milwaukee Bucks, as a free agent, and played 2 games with the Bucks, in the 1985-86 NBA season.

=== Philippine stint ===
Rowland was one of the two American reinforcements, along with the late Bobby Parks, who played for Shell Rimula X, during the Third Conference of the 1988 Philippine Basketball Association (PBA) season. He scored a high of 51 points, on October 11, 1988, and led his team all the way to the finals.

== Coaching career ==
Rowland was head coach of the Albany Patroons in the Continental Basketball Association (CBA) and United States Basketball League (USBL) from 2006 to 2007. He was head coach of the Rio Grande Valley Silverados in the CBA during the 2007–08 season. Rowland returned to the Patroons in the CBA during the 2008–09 season.

== NBA career statistics ==
Legend
GP	Games played	GS	Games started	MPG	Minutes per game
FG%	Field goal percentage	3P%	3-point field goal percentage	FT%	Free throw percentage
RPG	Rebounds per game	APG	Assists per game	SPG	Steals per game
BPG	Blocks per game	PPG	Points per game	**Bold**	Career high

=== Regular season ===
Year	Team	GP	GS	MPG	FG%	3P%	FT%	RPG	APG	SPG	BPG	PPG
1985-86	Milwaukee	2	0	4.5	.333	.000	.500	0.5	0.5	0.0	0.0	1.5
Career		2	0	4.5	.333	.000	.500	0.5	0.5	0.0	0.0	1.5
