= Ron Anderson (basketball, born 1989) =

American basketball player

No. 5 – Poitiers Basket 86
- Position: Forward
- League: Pro B

Personal information
- Born: September 12, 1989 (age 37) Upper Marlboro, Maryland
- Listed height: 6 ft 8 in (2.03 m)
- Listed weight: 260 lb (118 kg)

Career information
- High school: McCallie School (Chattanooga, Tennessee)
- College: Kansas State (2007–2009); South Florida (2010–2012)
- NBA draft: 2012: undrafted
- Playing career: 2012–present

Career history
- 2012–2013: Tulsa 66ers
- 2013: Estudiantes Concordia
- 2013–2014: Tulsa 66ers / Oklahoma City Blue
- 2014–2015: Westchester Knicks
- 2015: Texas Legends
- 2015–2016: ABBR Opale Sud
- 2018–present: Poitiers 86
- Stats at Basketball Reference

Ron Anderson Jr. (born September 12, 1989) is an American professional basketball player who formerly played for ABBR Opale Sud of the Championnat de France de basketball de Nationale masculine 1 (NM1), the third tier of French basketball. He is the son of former NBA player Ron Anderson.

== High school career ==
Anderson attended McCallie School in Chattanooga, Tennessee. As a senior, he averaged 15.1 points, 11.6 rebounds and 2.8 blocks per game while helping the Blue Tornadoes to a school-record 24–5 overall mark and an appearance in the semifinals of the Division II State Tournament.

== College career ==
=== South Florida ===
In 2009, Anderson transferred to South Florida and subsequently sat out the 2009–10 season due to NCAA transfer rules.

In his redshirted junior season, his 6.4 rebounds and 2.4 offensive rebounds was 14th and 10th in the BIG EAST respectively. He was also fifth on the team in scoring at 7.0 points per game.

In his senior season, he played 36 games, averaging 6.9 points, 5.5 rebounds and 1.1 assists per game.

== Professional career ==
Anderson went undrafted in the 2012 NBA draft. On November 2, 2012, he was selected in the fourth round of the 2012 NBA D-League draft by the Tulsa 66ers.

In July 2013, he joined the Oklahoma City Thunder for the 2013 NBA Summer League. In October 2013, he joined Estudiantes Concordia of Argentina for the 2013–14 season. In December 2013, he left Estudiantes after 16 games. On December 19, 2013, he was re-acquired by the Tulsa 66ers.

In July 2014, he re-joined the Oklahoma City Thunder for the 2014 NBA Summer League. On November 4, 2014, he was acquired by the Oklahoma City Blue. On December 26, 2014, he was traded to the Westchester Knicks in exchange for a 2015 third-round pick. On February 17, 2015, he was released by the Knicks. On March 22 he was acquired by the Texas Legends.

On July 31, 2015, Anderson signed with ABBR Opale Sud.

=== The Basketball Tournament ===
In 2017, Anderson played for the Tampa Bulls of The Basketball Tournament. Anderson's team made it to the Sweet 16 before they were defeated by eventual tournament champ, Overseas Elite. Anderson averaged 6.7 PPG and 5.3 RPG for the tournament.
