= 1985–86 Indiana Pacers season =

NBA professional basketball team season

- Head coach: George Irvine
- Arena: Market Square Arena

Results
- Record: 26–56 (.317)
- Place: Division: 6th (Central); Conference: 10th (Eastern)
- Playoff finish: Did not qualify
- Stats at Basketball Reference

Local media
- Television: WTTV (Eddie Doucette, Bobby "Slick" Leonard)
- Radio: WNDE (Greg Papa)

The 1985–86 Indiana Pacers season was Indiana's tenth season in the NBA and 19th season as a franchise.

== Offseason ==
=== Draft picks ===
This table only lists picks through the second round.

Round	Pick	Player	Position	Nationality	College
1	2	Wayman Tisdale	PF/C	United States	Oklahoma
2	26	Bill Martin	F	United States	Georgetown
2	27	Dwayne McClain	SG/SF	United States	Villanova

== Roster ==
1985–86 Indiana Pacers roster
Players

Pos.	No.	Player	Height	Weight	DOB	From
SF	15	Ron Anderson	6 ft 7 in (2.01 m)	215 lb (98 kg)		Fresno State
PG	10	Vern Fleming	6 ft 5 in (1.96 m)	185 lb (84 kg)		Georgia
PF	20	Bill Garnett	6 ft 9 in (2.06 m)	225 lb (102 kg)		Wyoming
C	55	Stuart Gray	7 ft 0 in (2.13 m)	235 lb (107 kg)		UCLA
PF	33	Clark Kellogg (injured)	6 ft 7 in (2.01 m)	225 lb (102 kg)		Ohio State
SF	22	Bill Martin	6 ft 7 in (2.01 m)	205 lb (93 kg)		Georgetown
SF	44	Dwayne McClain	6 ft 6 in (1.98 m)	185 lb (84 kg)		Villanova
SG	4	Clint Richardson	6 ft 3 in (1.91 m)	195 lb (88 kg)		Seattle
SG	43	Terence Stansbury	6 ft 5 in (1.96 m)	170 lb (77 kg)		Temple
C	40	Steve Stipanovich	6 ft 11 in (2.11 m)	245 lb (111 kg)		Missouri
PF	23	Wayman Tisdale	6 ft 9 in (2.06 m)	240 lb (109 kg)		Oklahoma
PG	21	Bryan Warrick	6 ft 5 in (1.96 m)	195 lb (88 kg)		Saint Joseph's
C	32	Herb Williams	6 ft 10 in (2.08 m)	242 lb (110 kg)		Ohio State

Coaches
Head coach
- George Irvine
Assistant(s)
- Mel Daniels
- Donnie Walsh

Legend
- (DP) Unsigned draft pick
- (FA) Free agent
- (S) Suspended
- Injured

== Regular season ==
=== Season standings ===
Central Division	W	L	PCT	GB	Home	Road	Div
y-Milwaukee Bucks	57	25	.695	–	33–8	24–17	21–9
x-Atlanta Hawks	50	32	.610	7	34–7	16–25	21–9
x-Detroit Pistons	46	36	.561	11	31–10	15–26	18–12
x-Chicago Bulls	30	52	.366	27	22–19	8–33	10–20
Cleveland Cavaliers	29	53	.354	28	16–25	13–28	10–19
Indiana Pacers	26	56	.317	31	19–22	7–34	9–20

#	Eastern Conference				
#	Team	W	L	PCT	GB
1	z-Boston Celtics	67	15	.817	–
2	y-Milwaukee Bucks	57	25	.695	10
3	x-Philadelphia 76ers	54	28	.659	13
4	x-Atlanta Hawks	50	32	.610	17
5	x-Detroit Pistons	46	36	.561	21
6	x-Washington Bullets	39	43	.476	28
7	x-New Jersey Nets	39	43	.476	28
8	x-Chicago Bulls	30	52	.366	37
9	Cleveland Cavaliers	29	53	.354	38
10	Indiana Pacers	26	56	.317	41
11	New York Knicks	23	59	.280	44

z - clinched division title
y - clinched division title
x - clinched playoff spot

== Player statistics ==
=== Regular season ===
Player	POS	GP	GS	MP	REB	AST	STL	BLK	PTS	MPG	RPG	APG	SPG	BPG	PPG
Clint Richardson	SG	82	61	2,224	251	372	58	8	794	27.1	3.1	4.5	.7	.1	9.7
Wayman Tisdale	PF	81	60	2,277	584	79	32	44	1,192	28.1	7.2	1.0	.4	.5	14.7
Vern Fleming	PG	80	77	2,870	386	505	131	5	1,136	35.9	4.8	6.3	1.6	.1	14.2
Bill Garnett	PF	80	2	1,197	275	95	39	22	340	15.0	3.4	1.2	.5	.3	4.3
Steve Stipanovich	C	79	65	2,397	623	206	75	69	1,076	30.3	7.9	2.6	.9	.9	13.6
Herb Williams	C	78	74	2,770	710	174	50	184	1,549	35.5	9.1	2.2	.6	2.4	19.9
Terence Stansbury	SG	74	17	1,331	139	206	59	8	498	18.0	1.9	2.8	.8	.1	6.7
Stuart Gray	C	67	3	423	118	15	8	11	155	6.3	1.8	.2	.1	.2	2.3
Bill Martin	SF	66	0	691	102	52	21	7	332	10.5	1.5	.8	.3	.1	5.0
Ron Anderson^{†}	SF	60	27	1,469	248	136	55	6	621	24.5	4.1	2.3	.9	.1	10.4
Dwayne McClain	SF	45	4	461	30	67	38	4	157	10.2	.7	1.5	.8	.1	3.5
Quinn Buckner	PG	32	3	419	51	86	40	3	117	13.1	1.6	2.7	1.3	.1	3.7
Bryan Warrick^{†}	PG	31	5	658	66	109	25	2	217	21.2	2.1	3.5	.8	.1	7.0
Clark Kellogg	PF	19	12	568	168	57	28	8	335	29.9	8.8	3.0	1.5	.4	17.6

- ^{†} Denotes player spent time with another team in the season. Stats reflect time with the Pacers only.

== See also ==
- 1985-86 NBA season
