= 1985–86 Phoenix Suns season =

NBA team season

- Head coach: John MacLeod
- General manager: Jerry Colangelo
- Owners: Karl Eller, Don Pitt, Don Diamond, Bhavik Darji, Marvin Meyer, Richard L. Bloch
- Arena: Arizona Veterans Memorial Coliseum

Results
- Record: 32–50 (.390)
- Place: Division: 3rd (Pacific); Conference: 9th (Western)
- Playoff finish: Did not qualify
- Stats at Basketball Reference

Local media
- Television: KNXV-TV
- Radio: KTAR

The 1985–86 Phoenix Suns season was the 18th season for the Phoenix Suns of the National Basketball Association. The Suns finished the regular season tied with their third-worst record to that point, going just 32–50. Coupled with every team in the Western Conference's Midwest division finishing with a better record than all but two teams from the Pacific division, and the Suns were out of the playoffs for the first time in eight seasons, ending a then-franchise record streak for consecutive playoff berths. The Suns were led by head coach John MacLeod, in his 13th year with the Suns, and played all home games in Arizona Veterans Memorial Coliseum.

Walter Davis bounced back from injury that caused him to miss the majority of the previous season, leading the Suns in scoring at 22 points per game, his highest output since his 1978–79 season with the Suns. Phoenix boasted a pair of 20–20 scorers, as Larry Nance continued to increase his scoring each season since being drafted five seasons ago by Phoenix, with a 20.2 average a game for the season. Nance would finish the season ranked third in the NBA in field goal percentage and lead the Suns in rebounds. Mike Sanders came off the bench and appeared in all 82 regular season games, averaging a career-high 11.0 points a game.

== Offseason ==
=== NBA draft ===
Round	Pick	Player	Position	Nationality	College / Club
1	10	Ed Pinckney	Forward	United States	Villanova
2	32	Nick Vanos	Center	United States	Santa Clara
3	56	Jerry Everett	Guard	United States	Lamar
4	78	Granger Hall	Forward	United States	Temple
5	102	Shawn Campbell	Center	United States	Weber State
6	124	Charles Rayne	Guard	United States	Temple
7	148	Georgi Glouchkov	Forward	Bulgaria	(Bulgaria) Akademik Varna

== Roster ==
1985–86 Phoenix Suns roster
Players

Pos.	No.	Player	Height	Weight	DOB	From
F/C	33	Alvan Adams	6 ft 9 in (2.06 m)	210 lb (95 kg)	1954-07-19	Oklahoma
G/F	6	Walter Davis	6 ft 6 in (1.98 m)	193 lb (88 kg)	1954-09-09	North Carolina
C	53	James Edwards (injured)	7 ft 0 in (2.13 m)	225 lb (102 kg)	1955-11-22	Washington
G	10	Rod Foster	6 ft 1 in (1.85 m)	160 lb (73 kg)	1960-10-10	UCLA
F	16	Georgi Glouchkov	6 ft 8 in (2.03 m)	235 lb (107 kg)	1960-01-10	Bulgaria
G	24	Jay Humphries	6 ft 3 in (1.91 m)	185 lb (84 kg)	1962-10-17	Colorado
F	34	Charles Jones	6 ft 8 in (2.03 m)	215 lb (98 kg)	1962-01-12	Louisville
F/C	22	Larry Nance	6 ft 10 in (2.08 m)	205 lb (93 kg)	1959-02-12	Clemson
F	54	Ed Pinckney	6 ft 9 in (2.06 m)	195 lb (88 kg)	1963-03-27	Villanova
F	32	Charles Pittman	6 ft 8 in (2.03 m)	220 lb (100 kg)	1958-03-23	Maryland
C	8	Rick Robey	6 ft 11 in (2.11 m)	230 lb (104 kg)	1956-01-30	Kentucky
G/F	11	Mike Sanders	6 ft 6 in (1.98 m)	210 lb (95 kg)	1960-05-07	UCLA
G/F	7	Bernard Thompson	6 ft 6 in (1.98 m)	210 lb (95 kg)	1962-08-30	Fresno State
G	15	Sedric Toney	6 ft 2 in (1.88 m)	178 lb (81 kg)	1962-04-13	Dayton
C	30	Nick Vanos	7 ft 1 in (2.16 m)	255 lb (116 kg)	1963-04-13	Santa Clara

Coaches
Head coach
- John MacLeod (Bellarmine)
Assistant(s)
- Al Bianchi (Bowling Green)
- John Wetzel (Virginia Tech)

Legend
- (DP) Unsigned draft pick
- (FA) Free agent
- (S) Suspended
- Injured

== Regular season ==
- The Suns were the last winless team, starting the season 0–9.
- On February 18, 1986, Alvin Robertson recorded the second quadruple-double (double digits in four statistical categories in a single game) in NBA history, when he registered 20 points, 11 rebounds, 10 assists and 10 steals while playing for the Spurs against the Suns. He is also the only player to do so with steals as the fourth category (the other three were with blocks).

=== Standings ===
Pacific Division	W	L	PCT	GB	Home	Road	Div
y-Los Angeles Lakers	62	20	.756	–	35–6	27–14	23–7
x-Portland Trail Blazers	40	42	.488	22	27–14	13–28	18–12
Phoenix Suns	32	50	.390	30	23–18	9–32	16–14
Los Angeles Clippers	32	50	.390	30	22–19	10–31	10–20
Seattle SuperSonics	31	51	.378	31	24–17	7–34	11–19
Golden State Warriors	30	52	.366	32	24–17	6–35	12–18

#	Western Conference				
#	Team	W	L	PCT	GB
1	c-Los Angeles Lakers	62	20	.756	–
2	y-Houston Rockets	51	31	.622	11
3	x-Denver Nuggets	47	35	.573	15
4	x-Dallas Mavericks	44	38	.537	18
5	x-Utah Jazz	42	40	.512	20
6	x-Portland Trail Blazers	40	42	.488	22
7	x-Sacramento Kings	37	45	.451	25
8	x-San Antonio Spurs	35	47	.427	27
9	Phoenix Suns	32	50	.390	30
10	Los Angeles Clippers	32	50	.390	30
11	Seattle SuperSonics	31	51	.378	31
12	Golden State Warriors	30	52	.366	32

== Awards and honors ==
=== Week/Month ===
- Larry Nance was named Player of the Week for games played December 16 through December 22.

=== All-Star ===
This was the first year in franchise history that the Suns were not represented in the All-Star Game.

== Player statistics ==
Legend
GP	Games played	GS	Games started	MPG	Minutes per game
FG%	Field-goal percentage	3P%	3-point field-goal percentage	FT%	Free-throw percentage
RPG	Rebounds per game	APG	Assists per game	SPG	Steals per game
BPG	Blocks per game	PPG	Points per game

=== Season ===
Phoenix Suns statistics
Player	GP	GS	MPG	FG%	3P%	FT%	RPG	APG	SPG	BPG	PPG
Alvan Adams	78	45	25.7	.502	.	.783	6.1	4.2	1.3	.6	10.8
Walter Davis	70	62	32.0	.485	.237	.843	2.9	5.2	1.4	.0	21.8
Devin Durrant	4	0	12.8	.381	.	.250	2.0	1.3	.8	.0	4.3
James Edwards	52	51	25.3	.542	.	.702	5.8	1.4	.4	.6	16.3
Rod Foster	48	0	14.7	.390	.281	.719	1.2	2.5	.5	.0	4.2
Georgi Glouchkov	49	16	15.8	.402	1.000	.574	3.3	0.7	.5	.5	4.9
Mike Holton*	4	0	16.3	.200	.000	.667	0.8	1.8	.5	.0	3.0
Jay Humphries	82	82	33.3	.479	.138	.767	3.2	6.4	1.6	.1	11.0
Charles Jones	43	18	17.3	.457	.000	.510	4.5	1.2	.7	.6	4.7
Larry Nance	73	69	34.0	.581†	.000	.698	8.5	3.3	1.0	1.8	20.2
Ed Pinckney	80	24	20.0	.558	.000	.673	3.9	1.1	.9	.5	8.5
Charles Pittman	69	17	16.4	.583†	.	.702	3.6	0.8	.5	.3	5.1
Rick Robey	46	1	13.7	.377	.000	.688	3.2	1.3	.4	.1	3.8
Mike Sanders	82	5	20.0	.513	.200	.809	3.3	1.8	.9	.4	11.0
Bernard Thompson	61	20	21.0	.489	.000	.809	2.3	2.2	.8	.2	8.5
Sedric Toney*	10	0	20.6	.441	.300	.667	2.3	2.6	.5	.0	7.5
Nick Vanos	11	0	18.4	.319	.	.348	5.5	1.5	.2	.5	4.9

* – Stats with the Suns.
† – Minimum 300 field goals made.

== Transactions ==
=== Trades ===
June 14, 1985	To Portland Trail Blazers 1987 second-round draft pick ( (United States) Nikita Wilson)	To Phoenix Suns (United States) Bernard Thompson
August 19, 1985	To Los Angeles Lakers (United States) Maurice Lucas	To Phoenix Suns 1988 second-round draft pick ( (United States) Steve Kerr) 1989 second-round draft pick ( (United States) Greg Grant)
October 4, 1985	To Chicago Bulls Suns agree to waive their right of first refusal on free agent Kyle Macy	To Phoenix Suns 1986 second-round draft pick ( (United States) Rafael Addison) 1990 second-round draft pick ( (Socialist Federal Republic of Yugoslavia) Miloš Babić)

=== Free agents ===
==== Additions ====
Date	Player	Contract	Old Team
September 26, 1985	Alvin Scott	Re-signed to 1-year contract	Phoenix Suns
October 8, 1985	Devin Durrant	Undisclosed	Indiana Pacers
December 13, 1985	Charles Pittman	Undisclosed	Phoenix Suns
March 29, 1986	Sedric Toney	Undisclosed	Atlanta Hawks

==== Subtractions ====
Date	Player	Reason left	New team
October 4, 1985	Kyle Macy	Free agent	Chicago Bulls
October 14, 1985	Alvin Scott	Waived	RCD Espanyol Bàsquet (Spain)
November 4, 1985	Devin Durrant	Waived	Olympique Antibes (France)
November 4, 1985	Michael Holton	Waived	Florida Stingers (CBA)
December 10, 1985	Charles Pittman	Waived	Phoenix Suns
