= 1985–86 NBA season =

40th NBA season

- League: National Basketball Association
- Sport: Basketball
- Duration: October 25, 1985 – April 13, 1986; April 17 – May 21, 1986 (Playoffs); May 26 – June 8, 1986 (Finals)
- Teams: 23
- TV partner(s): CBS, TBS

Draft
- Top draft pick: Patrick Ewing
- Picked by: New York Knicks

Regular season
- Top seed: Boston Celtics
- Season MVP: Larry Bird (Boston)
- Top scorer: Dominique Wilkins (Atlanta)

Playoffs
- Eastern champions: Boston Celtics
- Eastern runners-up: Milwaukee Bucks
- Western champions: Houston Rockets
- Western runners-up: Los Angeles Lakers

Finals
- Champions: Boston Celtics
- Runners-up: Houston Rockets
- Finals MVP: Larry Bird (Boston)

NBA seasons
- ← 1984–85 1986–87 →

The 1985–86 NBA season was the 40th season of the National Basketball Association. The season ended with the Boston Celtics winning their third NBA championship of the decade, beating the Houston Rockets 4 games to 2 in the NBA Finals. This would be their last championship until winning it again in 2008.

== Notable occurrences ==
Coaching changes
Offseason
Team	1984–85 coach	1985–86 coach
Philadelphia 76ers	Billy Cunningham	Matt Guokas
Chicago Bulls	Kevin Loughery	Stan Albeck
New Jersey Nets	Stan Albeck	Dave Wohl
Seattle SuperSonics	Lenny Wilkens	Bernie Bickerstaff
In-season
Team	Outgoing coach	Incoming coach
Washington Bullets	Gene Shue	Kevin Loughery
Cleveland Cavaliers	George Karl	Gene Littles

- The 1986 NBA All-Star Game was played at Reunion Arena in Dallas, Texas, with the East defeating the West 139–132. Isiah Thomas of the Detroit Pistons wins the game's MVP award. To add to the All-Star Weekend festivities, 5-foot-7-inch Spud Webb of the Atlanta Hawks wins the slam-dunk competition. The first three-point shootout was also held, won by Larry Bird (his first of three consecutive).
- The Kings relocate from Kansas City, Missouri to Sacramento, California. They played their home games at ARCO Arena I for three seasons while ARCO Arena II was under construction.
- The Seattle SuperSonics returned to the Seattle Center Coliseum after a seven season absence. They had moved to the Kingdome in 1978 to try to raise attendance numbers in the larger stadium (one of two teams, along with the Detroit Pistons, to move to a domed stadium that year.)
- The Chicago Bulls are the last Eastern Conference team in NBA history to lose 50 or more games in a season and still make the playoffs.
- The Boston Celtics post an impressive 40–1 (.976) record at home. Their only regular-season home loss occurred on December 6, 1985, to the Portland Trail Blazers, by the score of 121–103. The record would be tied by the San Antonio Spurs in the 2015–16 season. The Celtics won all 10 home games in the postseason, making it 50 home wins total and finished the season with 41 straight home wins.
- This season marks the first time the NBA hands out a Most Improved Player award at the end of a season. Alvin Robertson of the San Antonio Spurs is the first to win the award. Robertson would also set the record for consecutive games with a steal (105), which stood for 22 years.
- In the third game of the season, Chicago Bulls sensation Michael Jordan suffered a broken left foot and missed the next 64 games. In Game 2 of the Eastern Conference First Round series, Jordan scored 63 points against Boston, an NBA playoff record, but his Chicago Bulls would lose in double overtime.
- All Midwest Division teams make the playoffs, the first time an entire division had done this since the 1983–84 season when all Atlantic Division teams made the playoffs.
- The first NBA draft of the Lottery Era was conducted at the Felt Forum of Madison Square Garden in New York City. Patrick Ewing was selected as the first overall pick by the New York Knicks. Ewing, the winner of the NBA Rookie of the Year Award that season, set the record for most games missed (32) for a Rookie of the Year winner.
- Ralph Sampson's off-balanced buzzer-beating shot in Game 5 of the Western Conference Finals sent the Houston Rockets to their second NBA Finals, defeating the erstwhile defending champion Los Angeles Lakers 4–1. This marked the second and last time in the 1980s a team other than the Lakers represented the West in the NBA Finals (1981, also by the Rockets). The Rockets fell in six games to the Boston Celtics, a similar result to their previous meeting five years earlier.
- Detlef Schrempf became the first German player to enter the NBA. He would later become the first European-born player to be named an All-Star in 1993 and had the most number of seasons played for a European player.
- New Jersey Nets guard Micheal Ray Richardson was banned for life by the NBA for his third violation of the league's anti-drug policy. Houston Rockets guard John Lucas was also suspended by the team for a similar violation; had he not been suspended, he would've played in the NBA Finals for the first time.
- On Wednesday, October 30, 1985, forward Georgi Glouchkov arrived in the U.S. from Bulgaria to play for the Phoenix Suns. He was the first player from a former Eastern Bloc country to play in the NBA. He would make his debut on Wednesday, November 6 against the Atlanta Hawks.
- The Los Angeles Clippers surprised the league by starting the season 5–0. The Denver Nuggets were the last undefeated team, starting the season 6–0. The New York Knicks started the season 0–8 in the midst of a 20-game losing streak. The Knicks' last victory was March 22, 1985. The Phoenix Suns were the last winless team, starting the season 0–9.
- On Saturday, November 30, 1985, Cleveland Cavalier World B. Free scored his 16,000th career point.
- On Wednesday, December 4, 1985, Maurice Lucas of the Los Angeles Lakers made a 60-foot shot at the regulation buzzer to send the game into overtime. The Lakers would go on to defeat the Utah Jazz 131–127.
- On Tuesday, December 10, 1985, the Indiana Pacers scored only 64 points in a 64–82 loss to the New York Knicks. It was the fewest points scored by a team in 13 years – since an October 21, 1972 game in which the Buffalo Braves managed only 63 against the Milwaukee Bucks. Indiana's 64 was the fourth lowest total since the NBA implemented the 24-second shot clock in 1954–55.
- The Los Angeles Lakers started the season 19–2.
- On Wednesday, December 25, 1985, in a matchup of one of the worst teams in the league (New York Knicks, 10–19) against one of the best (Boston Celtics, 21–7), the Knicks defeated Boston in double overtime, 113–104. Rookie Patrick Ewing had 32 points and 11 rebounds for the Knicks.
- On Tuesday, January 14, 1986, the Utah Jazz snapped the Houston Rockets' 20-game home winning streak with a 105–102 victory. Both Akeem Olajuwon and Ralph Sampson fouled out of the game.
- On Wednesday, January 15, 1986, the Golden State Warriors scored 150 points in a 150–104 regulation victory over the Utah Jazz. None of Golden State's starters played in the fourth quarter. Eight Golden State players scored in double figures.
- On Wednesday, January 22, 1986, the Boston Celtics (31–8) defeated the defending champion Los Angeles Lakers (32–8) 110–95 in a matchup of the league's two best teams.
- On Friday, January 24, 1986, the Boston Celtics (32–8) overtook the Los Angeles Lakers (32–9) as the team with the best record in the NBA. The Celtics maintained the league's best record for the remainder of the season.
- On Thursday, February 6, 1986, Kareem Abdul-Jabbar of the Los Angeles Lakers scored 46 points in a game against the Houston Rockets, his highest single-game total since a 48-point performance against the Portland Trail Blazers on November 26, 1975. The Lakers defeated the Rockets 117–95.
- On Sunday, February 16, 1986, in the season's second matchup between the Celtics and Lakers, Boston won again, 105–99.
- On Tuesday, February 18, 1986, Alvin Robertson of the San Antonio Spurs recorded the second quadruple-double in NBA history. He scored 20 points, grabbed 11 rebounds, dished 10 assists and stole the ball 10 times in a 114–96 victory over the Phoenix Suns.
- On Sunday, April 6, 1986, the Houston Rockets (50–29) set a franchise record for wins in a season with a 109–103 win over the Los Angeles Lakers. It was also the Rockets' first victory over the Lakers at The Summit (Houston's home arena) since a 107–104 victory on November 12, 1980.
- Backboard height is shortened 6 in (15.2 cm) to the present 42 in (1.067 m).
- Among the notable players retiring this season includes George Gervin, Bob McAdoo, Quinn Buckner, Jamaal Wilkes, and Bobby Jones.

== Final standings ==
=== By division ===
Atlantic Division	W	L	PCT	GB	Home	Road	Div
y-Boston Celtics	67	15	.817	–	40–1	27–14	18–6
x-Philadelphia 76ers	54	28	.659	13	31–10	23–18	15–9
x-Washington Bullets	39	43	.476	28	26–15	13–28	11–13
x-New Jersey Nets	39	43	.476	28	26–15	13–28	11–13
New York Knicks	23	59	.280	44	15–26	8–33	5–19

Central Division	W	L	PCT	GB	Home	Road	Div
y-Milwaukee Bucks	57	25	.695	–	33–8	24–17	21–9
x-Atlanta Hawks	50	32	.610	7	34–7	16–25	21–9
x-Detroit Pistons	46	36	.561	11	31–10	15–26	18–12
x-Chicago Bulls	30	52	.366	27	22–19	8–33	10–20
Cleveland Cavaliers	29	53	.354	28	16–25	13–28	10–19
Indiana Pacers	26	56	.317	31	19–22	7–34	9–20

Midwest Division	W	L	PCT	GB	Home	Road	Div
y-Houston Rockets	51	31	.622	–	36–5	15–26	20–10
x-Denver Nuggets	47	35	.573	4	34–7	13–28	15–15
x-Dallas Mavericks	44	38	.537	7	26–15	18–23	16–14
x-Utah Jazz	42	40	.512	9	27–14	15–26	15–15
x-Sacramento Kings	37	45	.451	14	25–16	12–29	15–15
x-San Antonio Spurs	35	47	.427	16	21–20	14–27	9–21

Pacific Division	W	L	PCT	GB	Home	Road	Div
y-Los Angeles Lakers	62	20	.756	–	35–6	27–14	23–7
x-Portland Trail Blazers	40	42	.488	22	27–14	13–28	18–12
Phoenix Suns	32	50	.390	30	23–18	9–32	16–14
Los Angeles Clippers	32	50	.390	30	22–19	10–31	10–20
Seattle SuperSonics	31	51	.378	31	24–17	7–34	11–19
Golden State Warriors	30	52	.366	32	24–17	6–35	12–18

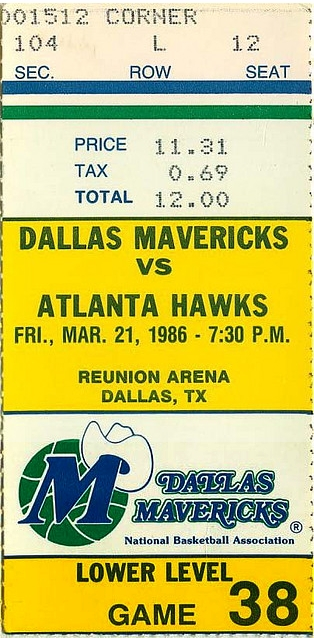
A ticket for a March 1986 game between the Atlanta Hawks and the Dallas Mavericks.

=== By conference ===
#	Eastern Conference				
#	Team	W	L	PCT	GB
1	z-Boston Celtics	67	15	.817	–
2	y-Milwaukee Bucks	57	25	.695	10
3	x-Philadelphia 76ers	54	28	.659	13
4	x-Atlanta Hawks	50	32	.610	17
5	x-Detroit Pistons	46	36	.561	21
6	x-Washington Bullets	39	43	.476	28
7	x-New Jersey Nets	39	43	.476	28
8	x-Chicago Bulls	30	52	.366	37
9	Cleveland Cavaliers	29	53	.354	38
10	Indiana Pacers	26	56	.317	41
11	New York Knicks	23	59	.280	44

#	Western Conference				
#	Team	W	L	PCT	GB
1	c-Los Angeles Lakers	62	20	.756	–
2	y-Houston Rockets	51	31	.622	11
3	x-Denver Nuggets	47	35	.573	15
4	x-Dallas Mavericks	44	38	.537	18
5	x-Utah Jazz	42	40	.512	20
6	x-Portland Trail Blazers	40	42	.488	22
7	x-Sacramento Kings	37	45	.451	25
8	x-San Antonio Spurs	35	47	.427	27
9	Phoenix Suns	32	50	.390	30
10	Los Angeles Clippers	32	50	.390	30
11	Seattle SuperSonics	31	51	.378	31
12	Golden State Warriors	30	52	.366	32

Notes

- z – Clinched home court advantage for the entire playoffs
- c – Clinched home court advantage for the conference playoffs
- y – Clinched division title
- x – Clinched playoff spot

== Playoffs ==
Teams in bold advanced to the next round. The numbers to the left of each team indicate the team's seeding in its conference, and the numbers to the right indicate the number of games the team won in that round. The division champions are marked by an asterisk. Home court advantage does not necessarily belong to the higher-seeded team, but instead the team with the better regular season record; teams enjoying the home advantage are shown in italics.

First Round	Conference Semifinals
**E1**	**Boston***	**3**
E8	Chicago	0
**E1**	**Boston***	**4**
E4	Atlanta	1
**E4**	**Atlanta**	**3**
E5	Detroit	1
**Eastern Conference**
**E3**	**Philadelphia**	**3**
E6	Washington	2
E3	Philadelphia	3
**E2**	**Milwaukee***	**4**
**E2**	**Milwaukee***	**3**
E7	New Jersey	0
**W1**	**LA Lakers***	**3**
W8	San Antonio	0
**W1**	**LA Lakers***	**4**
W4	Dallas	2
**W4**	**Dallas**	**3**
W5	Utah	1
**Western Conference**
**W3**	**Denver**	**3**
W6	Portland	1
W3	Denver	2
**W2**	**Houston***	**4**
**W2**	**Houston***	**3**
W7	Sacramento	0

Conference Finals
**E1**	**Boston***	**4**
E2	Milwaukee*	0
W1	LA Lakers*	1
**W2**	**Houston***	**4**

NBA Finals
**E1**	**Boston***	**4**
W2	Houston*	2

- * Division winner
- **Bold** Series winner
- Italic Team with home-court advantage

== Statistics leaders ==
Category	Player	Team	Stat
Points per game	Dominique Wilkins	Atlanta Hawks	30.3
Rebounds per game	Bill Laimbeer	Detroit Pistons	13.1
Assists per game	Magic Johnson	Los Angeles Lakers	12.6
Steals per game	Alvin Robertson	San Antonio Spurs	3.67
Blocks per game	Manute Bol	Washington Bullets	4.96
FG%	Steve Johnson	San Antonio Spurs	.632
FT%	Larry Bird	Boston Celtics	.896
3FG%	Craig Hodges	Milwaukee Bucks	.451

== NBA awards ==
=== Yearly awards ===
- Most Valuable Player: Larry Bird, Boston Celtics
- Rookie of the Year: Patrick Ewing, New York Knicks
- Defensive Player of the Year: Alvin Robertson, San Antonio Spurs
- Sixth Man of the Year: Bill Walton, Boston Celtics
- Most Improved Player: Alvin Robertson, San Antonio Spurs
- Coach of the Year: Mike Fratello, Atlanta Hawks

- All-NBA First Team:
  - F – Larry Bird, Boston Celtics
  - F – Dominique Wilkins, Atlanta Hawks
  - C – Kareem Abdul-Jabbar, Los Angeles Lakers
  - G – Isiah Thomas, Detroit Pistons
  - G – Magic Johnson, Los Angeles Lakers
- All-NBA Second Team:
  - F – Charles Barkley, Philadelphia 76ers
  - F – Alex English, Denver Nuggets
  - C – Akeem Olajuwon, Houston Rockets
  - G – Sidney Moncrief, Milwaukee Bucks
  - G – Alvin Robertson, San Antonio Spurs

- All-NBA Rookie Team:
  - Joe Dumars, Detroit Pistons
  - Charles Oakley, Chicago Bulls
  - Patrick Ewing, New York Knicks
  - Xavier McDaniel, Seattle SuperSonics
  - Karl Malone, Utah Jazz

- NBA All-Defensive First Team:
  - Paul Pressey, Milwaukee Bucks
  - Kevin McHale, Boston Celtics
  - Mark Eaton, Utah Jazz
  - Sidney Moncrief, Milwaukee Bucks
  - Maurice Cheeks, Philadelphia 76ers
- NBA All-Defensive Second Team:
  - Michael Cooper, Los Angeles Lakers
  - Bill Hanzlik, Denver Nuggets
  - Manute Bol, Washington Bullets
  - Alvin Robertson, San Antonio Spurs
  - Dennis Johnson, Boston Celtics

=== Player of the week ===
The following players were named NBA Player of the Week.

Week	Player
Oct. 25 – Nov. 3	Derek Smith (Los Angeles Clippers)
Nov. 4 – Nov. 10	Buck Williams (New Jersey Nets)
Nov. 11 – Nov. 17	Patrick Ewing (New York Knicks)
Nov. 17 – Nov. 24	Alex English (Denver Nuggets)
Nov. 25 – Dec. 1	Larry Bird (Boston Celtics)
Dec. 2 – Dec. 8	Jeff Ruland (Washington Bullets)
Dec. 9 – Dec. 15	Alvin Robertson (San Antonio Spurs)
Dec. 16 – Dec. 22	Larry Nance (Phoenix Suns)
Dec. 23 – Dec. 29	Dominique Wilkins (Atlanta Hawks)
Dec. 30 – Jan. 5	Clyde Drexler (Portland Trail Blazers)
Jan. 6 – Jan. 12	Calvin Natt (Denver Nuggets)
Jan. 13 – Jan. 19	Larry Bird (Boston Celtics)
Jan. 20 – Jan. 26	Charles Barkley (Philadelphia 76ers)
Jan. 27 – Feb. 2	Alex English (Denver Nuggets)
Feb. 3 – Feb. 16	Larry Bird (Boston Celtics)
Feb. 17 – Feb. 23	Sidney Moncrief (Milwaukee Bucks)
Feb. 24 – Mar. 2	Charles Barkley (Philadelphia 76ers)
Mar. 3 – Mar. 9	Magic Johnson (Los Angeles Lakers)
Mar. 10 – Mar. 16	Larry Bird (Boston Celtics)
Mar. 17 – Mar. 23	Adrian Dantley (Utah Jazz)
Mar. 24 – Mar. 30	Charles Barkley (Philadelphia 76ers)
Mar. 31 – Apr. 6	Herb Williams (Indiana Pacers)
Apr. 7 – Apr. 13	Dominique Wilkins (Atlanta Hawks)

=== Player of the month ===
The following players were named NBA Player of the Month.

Month	Player
November	Akeem Olajuwon (Houston Rockets)
December	Alvin Robertson (San Antonio Spurs)
January	Dominique Wilkins (Atlanta Hawks)
February	Larry Bird (Boston Celtics)
March	Larry Bird (Boston Celtics)

=== Rookie of the month ===
The following players were named NBA Rookie of the Month.

Month	Rookie
November	Patrick Ewing (New York Knicks)
December	Karl Malone (Utah Jazz)
January	Patrick Ewing (New York Knicks)
February	Charles Oakley (Chicago Bulls)
March	Benoit Benjamin (Los Angeles Clippers)

=== Coach of the month ===
The following coaches were named NBA Coach of the Month.

Month	Coach
November	Pat Riley (Los Angeles Lakers)
December	Cotton Fitzsimmons (San Antonio Spurs)
January	Mike Fratello (Atlanta Hawks)
February	Chuck Daly (Detroit Pistons)
March	K.C. Jones (Boston Celtics)

== See also ==
- List of NBA regular season records
