= 1985–86 Detroit Pistons season =

NBA team season

- Head coach: Chuck Daly
- General manager: Jack McCloskey
- Owner: Bill Davidson
- Arena: Pontiac Silverdome

Results
- Record: 46–36 (.561)
- Place: Division: 3rd (Central); Conference: 5th (Eastern)
- Playoff finish: First round (lost to Hawks 1–3)
- Stats at Basketball Reference

Local media
- Television: WKBD-TV; PASS Sports
- Radio: WJR

The 1985–86 Detroit Pistons season was the Detroit Pistons' 38th season in the NBA and 29th season in Detroit. The team played at the Pontiac Silverdome in suburban Pontiac, Michigan.

The year got off to an excellent start as the Pistons drafted future Hall of Famer Joe Dumars with the 18th pick in the first-round of the 1985 NBA draft. The team's steady rise in recent years stalled during the 1985–86 season as the Pistons finished 46–36 (.561), 3rd in the Central Division. The team advanced to the playoffs but were beaten 3–1 by Dominique Wilkins and the rising Atlanta Hawks. When the series ended, Piston guard and team leader Isiah Thomas said, “All I know is something has to change next year.”

The Pistons were led by guard Thomas (20.9 ppg, 10.8 apg, NBA All-Star), center Bill Laimbeer (16.6 ppg, 13.1 rpg), and guard Vinnie "the Microwave" Johnson (13.9 ppg). Dumars (9.4 ppg) was named to the NBA All-Rookie Team. Before the 1986-87 Detroit Pistons season began, driven by Thomas, the Pistons would trade away several key players, including forward Kelly Tripucka, center Kent Benson and guard John Long.

== Draft picks ==
Round	Pick	Player	Position	Nationality	College
1	18	Joe Dumars	G	United States	McNeese State

== Roster ==
Detroit Pistons roster
Players

Pos.	No.	Player	Height	Weight	DOB	From
C	54	Kent Benson	6 ft 10 in (2.08 m)	235 lb (107 kg)		Indiana
SF	00	Tony Campbell	6 ft 7 in (2.01 m)	215 lb (98 kg)		Ohio State
C	42	Ron Crevier	7 ft 0 in (2.13 m)	235 lb (107 kg)		Boston College
F	23	Earl Cureton	6 ft 9 in (2.06 m)	245 lb (111 kg)		Detroit Mercy
SG	4	Joe Dumars	6 ft 3 in (1.91 m)	190 lb (86 kg)		McNeese State
PF	35	Mike Gibson	6 ft 10 in (2.08 m)	205 lb (93 kg)		USC Upstate
SG	15	Vinnie Johnson	6 ft 2 in (1.88 m)	200 lb (91 kg)		Baylor
C	40	Bill Laimbeer	6 ft 11 in (2.11 m)	245 lb (111 kg)		Notre Dame
SG	25	John Long	6 ft 5 in (1.96 m)	195 lb (88 kg)		Detroit Mercy
PF	44	Rick Mahorn	6 ft 10 in (2.08 m)	245 lb (111 kg)		Hampton
C	42	Chuck Nevitt	7 ft 5 in (2.26 m)	217 lb (98 kg)		NC State
PG	33	Walker Russell	6 ft 5 in (1.96 m)	195 lb (88 kg)		Western Michigan
PG	11	Isiah Thomas	6 ft 1 in (1.85 m)	180 lb (82 kg)		Indiana
SF	7	Kelly Tripucka	6 ft 6 in (1.98 m)	220 lb (100 kg)		Notre Dame

Coaches
Head coach
- (United States) Chuck Daly (Bloomsburg)

Legend
- (DP) Unsigned draft pick
- (FA) Free agent
- (S) Suspended
- Injured

Roster

== Regular season ==
=== Season standings ===
Central Division	W	L	PCT	GB	Home	Road	Div
y-Milwaukee Bucks	57	25	.695	–	33–8	24–17	21–9
x-Atlanta Hawks	50	32	.610	7	34–7	16–25	21–9
x-Detroit Pistons	46	36	.561	11	31–10	15–26	18–12
x-Chicago Bulls	30	52	.366	27	22–19	8–33	10–20
Cleveland Cavaliers	29	53	.354	28	16–25	13–28	10–19
Indiana Pacers	26	56	.317	31	19–22	7–34	9–20

#	Eastern Conference				
#	Team	W	L	PCT	GB
1	z-Boston Celtics	67	15	.817	–
2	y-Milwaukee Bucks	57	25	.695	10
3	x-Philadelphia 76ers	54	28	.659	13
4	x-Atlanta Hawks	50	32	.610	17
5	x-Detroit Pistons	46	36	.561	21
6	x-Washington Bullets	39	43	.476	28
7	x-New Jersey Nets	39	43	.476	28
8	x-Chicago Bulls	30	52	.366	37
9	Cleveland Cavaliers	29	53	.354	38
10	Indiana Pacers	26	56	.317	41
11	New York Knicks	23	59	.280	44

z – clinched division title
y – clinched division title
x – clinched playoff spot

== Game log ==
=== Regular season ===
1985–86 game log
Total: 46–36 (home: 31–10; road: 15–26)
October: 2–2 (home: 2–0; road: 0–2)

Game	Date	Team	Score	High points	High rebounds	High assists	Location Attendance	Record
1	October 25, 1985	Milwaukee	W 118–116				Pontiac Silverdome	1–0
2	October 26, 1985	@ Chicago	L 118–121				Chicago Stadium	1–1
3	October 29, 1985	New Jersey	W 124–107				Pontiac Silverdome	2–1
4	October 30, 1985	@ Philadelphia	L 125–132 (OT)				The Spectrum	2–2

November: 10–5 (home: 7–1; road: 3–4)

Game	Date	Team	Score	High points	High rebounds	High assists	Location Attendance	Record
5	November 1, 1985	Indiana	W 124–116				Pontiac Silverdome	3–2
6	November 2, 1985	@ Indiana	W 128–117				Market Square Arena	4–2
7	November 6, 1985	Chicago	W 122–105				Pontiac Silverdome	5–2
8	November 8, 1985	@ Washington	W 117–110				Capital Centre	6–2
9	November 9, 1985	Boston	L 105–124				Pontiac Silverdome	6–3
10	November 12, 1985	Washington	W 124–122 (OT)				Pontiac Silverdome	7–3
11	November 13, 1985	@ Milwaukee	L 118–137				MECCA Arena	7–4
12	November 15, 1985; 7:30 p.m. EST	@ Atlanta	L 118–122	Thomas (26)	Laimbeer (14)	Thomas (14)	The Omni; 12,924	7–5
13	November 20, 1985	New York	W 109–98				Pontiac Silverdome	8–5
14	November 22, 1985	Golden State	W 115–96				Pontiac Silverdome	9–5
15	November 23, 1985	@ Philadelphia	W 119–114				The Spectrum	10–5
16	November 26, 1985	Cleveland	W 113–98				Pontiac Silverdome	11–5
17	November 27, 1985	@ Boston	L 124–132				Boston Garden	11–6
18	November 29, 1985	Milwaukee	W 111–102				Pontiac Silverdome	12–6
19	November 30, 1985	@ Washington	L 119–133				Capital Centre	12–7

December: 3–10 (home: 1–5; road: 2–5)

Game	Date	Team	Score	High points	High rebounds	High assists	Location Attendance	Record
20	December 3, 1985	Philadelphia	L 107–127				Pontiac Silverdome	12–8
21	December 5, 1985	New Jersey	W 113–111				Pontiac Silverdome	13–8
22	December 7, 1985	Sacramento	L 112–122				Pontiac Silverdome	13–9
23	December 10, 1985	@ Cleveland	W 130–120				Richfield Coliseum	14–9
24	December 11, 1985	Washington	L 100–108				Pontiac Silverdome	14–10
25	December 13, 1985	San Antonio	L 113–119				Pontiac Silverdome	14–11
26	December 15, 1985	@ L.A. Lakers	L 119–132				The Forum	14–12
27	December 17, 1985	@ Sacramento	L 121–132				ARCO Arena	14–13
28	December 19, 1985	@ Seattle	W 99–97				Seattle Center Coliseum	15–13
29	December 21, 1985	@ New York	L 110–112				Madison Square Garden	15–14
30	December 26, 1985	@ New Jersey	L 116–124				Brendan Byrne Arena	15–15
31	December 27, 1985	Cleveland	L 105–119				Pontiac Silverdome	15–16
32	December 30, 1985	@ Milwaukee	L 110–121				MECCA Arena	15–17

January: 8–7 (home: 5–2; road: 3–5)

Game	Date	Team	Score	High points	High rebounds	High assists	Location Attendance	Record
33	January 2, 1986	@ Chicago	L 122–131				Chicago Stadium	15–18
34	January 3, 1986; 7:30 p.m. EST	@ Atlanta	L 101–111	Tripucka (26)	Laimbeer (17)	Thomas (5)	The Omni; 15,817	15–19
35	January 7, 1986	Boston	W 113–109				Pontiac Silverdome	16–19
36	January 9, 1986; 7:30 p.m. EST	Atlanta	L 99–110	Dumars (21)	Laimbeer (14)	Thomas (9)	Pontiac Silverdome; 9,400	16–20
37	January 11, 1986	Philadelphia	L 101–102				Pontiac Silverdome	16–21
38	January 15, 1986	Chicago	W 123–115				Pontiac Silverdome	17–21
39	January 17, 1986	Denver	W 129–113				Pontiac Silverdome	18–21
40	January 19, 1986	L.A. Lakers	W 118–115				Pontiac Silverdome	19–21
41	January 20, 1986	@ Indiana	L 99–105				Market Square Arena	19–22
42	January 22, 1986	@ Cleveland	W 107–104				Richfield Coliseum	20–22
43	January 24, 1986	@ Dallas	W 129–120				Reunion Arena	21–22
44	January 25, 1986	@ Houston	L 112–117				The Summit	21–23
45	January 27, 1986	@ San Antonio	W 118–117				HemisFair Arena	22–23
46	January 29, 1986; 7:30 p.m. EST	Atlanta	W 107–94	Johnson (24)	Laimbeer (10)	Thomas (13)	Pontiac Silverdome; 12,386	23–23
47	January 31, 1986; 7:30 p.m. EST	@ Atlanta	L 103–116	Dumars (22)	Laimbeer (16)	Thomas (9)	The Omni; 12,624	23–24

February: 13–1 (home: 10–0; road: 3–1)

Game	Date	Team	Score	High points	High rebounds	High assists	Location Attendance	Record
48	February 1, 1986	Washington	W 116–101				Pontiac Silverdome	24–24
49	February 4, 1986	@ Chicago	W 117–115				Chicago Stadium	25–24
50	February 6, 1986	@ Washington	W 111–109 (OT)				Capital Centre	26–24
All-Star Break
51	February 11, 1986	@ New Jersey	L 122–130				Brendan Byrne Arena	26–25
52	February 12, 1986	New York	W 113–99				Pontiac Silverdome	27–25
53	February 14, 1986	Dallas	W 119–110				Pontiac Silverdome	28–25
54	February 15, 1986	Philadelphia	W 134–133 (OT)				Pontiac Silverdome	29–25
55	February 17, 1986	Utah	W 117–96				Pontiac Silverdome	30–25
56	February 19, 1986	Seattle	W 118–113				Pontiac Silverdome	31–25
57	February 20, 1986	@ Cleveland	W 109–107				Richfield Coliseum	32–25
58	February 22, 1986	Portland	W 113–106				Pontiac Silverdome	33–25
59	February 24, 1986	Chicago	W 110–100				Pontiac Silverdome	34–25
60	February 26, 1986	L.A. Clippers	W 111–104				Pontiac Silverdome	35–25
61	February 28, 1986; 7:30 p.m. EST	Atlanta	W 115–103	Thomas (30)	Laimbeer (11)	Dumars, Thomas (6)	Pontiac Silverdome; 25,888	36–25

March: 6–8 (home: 4–1; road: 2–7)

Game	Date	Team	Score	High points	High rebounds	High assists	Location Attendance	Record
62	March 2, 1986	@ Boston	L 109–129				Boston Garden	36–26
63	March 4, 1986	New Jersey	W 120–103				Pontiac Silverdome	37–26
64	March 7, 1986	@ New Jersey	W 104–102				Brendan Byrne Arena	38–26
65	March 10, 1986	Phoenix	L 109–120				Pontiac Silverdome	38–27
66	March 12, 1986	Indiana	W 111–101				Pontiac Silverdome	39–27
67	March 14, 1986	New York	W 112–89				Pontiac Silverdome	40–27
68	March 16, 1986	@ Portland	L 109–119				Memorial Coliseum	40–28
69	March 17, 1986	@ Utah	L 106–107				Salt Palace Acord Arena	40–29
70	March 19, 1986	@ Denver	L 98–114				McNichols Sports Arena	40–30
71	March 21, 1986	@ Phoenix	L 103–105				Arizona Veterans Memorial Coliseum	40–31
72	March 22, 1986	@ L.A. Clippers	W 119–99				Los Angeles Memorial Sports Arena	41–31
73	March 25, 1986	@ Golden State	L 121–125				Oakland-Alameda County Coliseum Arena	41–32
74	March 28, 1986	Houston	W 116–107				Pontiac Silverdome	42–32
75	March 29, 1986	@ Milwaukee	L 121–130				MECCA Arena	42–33

April: 4–3 (home: 2–1; road: 2–2)

Game	Date	Team	Score	High points	High rebounds	High assists	Location Attendance	Record
76	April 1, 1986	Indiana	W 116–108				Pontiac Silverdome	43–33
77	April 2, 1986	@ Boston	L 106–122				Boston Garden	43–34
78	April 4, 1986	Milwaukee	L 108–115				Pontiac Silverdome	43–35
79	April 5, 1986	@ Indiana	W 115–106				Market Square Arena	44–35
80	April 7, 1986	Cleveland	W 128–104				Pontiac Silverdome	45–35
81	April 8, 1986	@ Philadelphia	L 112–116				The Spectrum	45–36
82	April 11, 1986	@ New York	W 108–95				Madison Square Garden	46–36

1985–86 schedule

=== Playoffs ===
1986 playoff game log
First Round: 1–3 (home: 1–1; road: 0–2)

Game	Date	Team	Score	High points	High rebounds	High assists	Location Attendance	Series
1	April 17, 1986; 8:00 p.m. EST	@ Atlanta	L 122–140	Laimbeer (26)	Laimbeer (17)	Thomas (16)	The Omni; 12,538	0–1
2	April 19, 1986; 3:30 p.m. EST	@ Atlanta	L 125–137	Thomas (36)	Laimbeer (12)	Thomas (9)	The Omni; 12,964	0–2
3	April 22, 1986; 8:00 p.m. EST	Atlanta	W 106–97	Tripucka (33)	Laimbeer (14)	Thomas (11)	Pontiac Silverdome; 13,312	1–2
4	April 25, 1986; 8:00 p.m. EST	Atlanta	L 113–114 (2OT)	Thomas (30)	Laimbeer (13)	Thomas (12)	Pontiac Silverdome; 15,288	1–3

1986 schedule

== Awards and records ==
- Isiah Thomas, All-NBA First Team
- Joe Dumars, NBA All-Rookie Team 1st Team

== See also ==
- 1985-86 NBA season
