= 1985–86 Washington Bullets season =

NBA professional basketball team season

- Head coach: Gene Shue (fired) (32–37); Kevin Loughery (7–6)
- General manager: Bob Ferry
- Owner: Abe Pollin
- Arena: Capital Centre

Results
- Record: 39–43 (.476)
- Place: Division: 3rd (Atlantic); Conference: 6th (Eastern)
- Playoff finish: First round (lost to 76ers 2–3)
- Stats at Basketball Reference

Local media
- Television: WDCA; Home Team Sports
- Radio: WTOP

The 1985–86 Washington Bullets season was the Bullets 25th season in the NBA and their 13th season in the city of Washington, D.C.

== Draft picks ==
Round	Pick	Player	Position	Nationality	College
1	12	Kenny Green	SF	United States	Wake Forest
2	31	Manute Bol	C	Sudan	Bridgeport
3	58	Vernon Moore		United States	Creighton
3	65	Ken Perry		United States	Southern Illinois
4	81	Richie Adams		United States	Nevada-Las Vegas
5	104	Dean Shaffer		United States	Florida State
6	127	Matt England		United States	Houston Baptist
7	150	Keith Gray		United States	Detroit Mercy

== Roster ==
1985–86 Washington Bullets roster
Players

Pos.	No.	Player	Height	Weight	DOB	From
C	10	Manute Bol	7 ft 7 in (2.31 m)	200 lb (91 kg)	1962-10-16	Bridgeport
SG	22	Dudley Bradley	6 ft 6 in (1.98 m)	195 lb (88 kg)	1957-03-19	North Carolina
SF	25	Darren Daye	6 ft 8 in (2.03 m)	220 lb (100 kg)	1960-11-30	UCLA
C	23	Charles Jones	6 ft 9 in (2.06 m)	215 lb (98 kg)	1957-04-03	Albany State
SG	24	Jeff Malone	6 ft 4 in (1.93 m)	205 lb (93 kg)	1961-06-28	Mississippi State
SG	3	Kevin McKenna	6 ft 5 in (1.96 m)	195 lb (88 kg)	1959-01-08	Creighton
C	54	Tom McMillen	6 ft 11 in (2.11 m)	215 lb (98 kg)	1952-05-26	Maryland
SF	4	Cliff Robinson	6 ft 9 in (2.06 m)	220 lb (100 kg)	1960-03-13	USC
PF	5	Dan Roundfield	6 ft 8 in (2.03 m)	205 lb (93 kg)	1953-05-26	Central Michigan
PF	43	Jeff Ruland	6 ft 10 in (2.08 m)	240 lb (109 kg)	1958-12-16	Iona
PG	1	Gus Williams	6 ft 2 in (1.88 m)	175 lb (79 kg)	1953-10-10	USC
PG	32	Leon Wood	6 ft 3 in (1.91 m)	185 lb (84 kg)	1962-03-25	Cal State Fullerton

Coaches
Head coach
- Gene Shue (fired)
- Kevin Loughery
Assistant(s)
- Fred Carter
- Don Moran

Legend
- (DP) Unsigned draft pick
- (FA) Free agent
- (S) Suspended
- Injured

Roster
Updated: May 13, 1986

== Regular season ==
=== Season standings ===
Atlantic Division	W	L	PCT	GB	Home	Road	Div
y-Boston Celtics	67	15	.817	–	40–1	27–14	18–6
x-Philadelphia 76ers	54	28	.659	13	31–10	23–18	15–9
x-Washington Bullets	39	43	.476	28	26–15	13–28	11–13
x-New Jersey Nets	39	43	.476	28	26–15	13–28	11–13
New York Knicks	23	59	.280	44	15–26	8–33	5–19

#	Eastern Conference				
#	Team	W	L	PCT	GB
1	z-Boston Celtics	67	15	.817	–
2	y-Milwaukee Bucks	57	25	.695	10
3	x-Philadelphia 76ers	54	28	.659	13
4	x-Atlanta Hawks	50	32	.610	17
5	x-Detroit Pistons	46	36	.561	21
6	x-Washington Bullets	39	43	.476	28
7	x-New Jersey Nets	39	43	.476	28
8	x-Chicago Bulls	30	52	.366	37
9	Cleveland Cavaliers	29	53	.354	38
10	Indiana Pacers	26	56	.317	41
11	New York Knicks	23	59	.280	44

Notes

- z, y – division champions
- x – clinched playoff spot

== Game log ==
=== Regular season ===
1985–86 game log
Total: 39–43 (home: 26–15; road: 13–28)
October: 2–1 (home: 0–1; road: 2–0)

Game	Date	Team	Score	High points	High rebounds	High assists	Location Attendance	Record
1	October 25, 1985; 7:30 p.m. EDT	@ Atlanta	W 100–91	Robinson (22)	Ruland (14)	Ruland (9)	The Omni; 10,129	1–0
2	October 29, 1985	@ Cleveland	W 97–90				Richfield Coliseum	2–0
3	October 31, 1985	Cleveland	L 107–114				Capital Centre	2–1

November: 5–9 (home: 5–3; road: 0–6)

Game	Date	Team	Score	High points	High rebounds	High assists	Location Attendance	Record
4	November 2, 1985	Boston	L 73–88				Capital Centre	2–2
5	November 5, 1985	@ New Jersey	L 106–112				Brendan Byrne Arena	2–3
6	November 6, 1985	San Antonio	L 80–81				Capital Centre	2–4
7	November 8, 1985	Detroit	L 110–117				Capital Centre	2–5
8	November 12, 1985	@ Detroit	L 122–124 (OT)				Pontiac Silverdome	2–6
9	November 15, 1985	@ Boston	L 114–118				Boston Garden	2–7
10	November 16, 1985	Philadelphia	W 118–97				Capital Centre	3–7
11	November 19, 1985	@ New York	L 94–98				Madison Square Garden	3–8
12	November 20, 1985	Cleveland	W 101–98				Capital Centre	4–8
13	November 22, 1985	New York	W 102–94				Capital Centre	5–8
14	November 24, 1985	Chicago	W 115–106				Capital Centre	6–8
15	November 26, 1985; 8:30 p.m. EST	@ Dallas	L 99–112				Reunion Arena; 17,007	6–9
16	November 27, 1985	@ San Antonio	L 97–104				HemisFair Arena	6–10
17	November 30, 1985	Detroit	W 133–119				Capital Centre	7–10

December: 8–5 (home: 5–4; road: 3–1)

Game	Date	Team	Score	High points	High rebounds	High assists	Location Attendance	Record
18	December 3, 1985	Portland	W 118–115				Capital Centre	8–10
19	December 4, 1985	@ Philadelphia	L 110–115 (OT)				The Spectrum	8–11
20	December 6, 1985	Seattle	W 115–109				Capital Centre	9–11
21	December 8, 1985	Sacramento	W 111–89				Capital Centre	10–11
22	December 11, 1985	@ Detroit	W 108–100				Pontiac Silverdome	11–11
23	December 12, 1985	Milwaukee	W 110–108 (OT)				Capital Centre	12–11
24	December 17, 1985	Utah	L 98–106				Capital Centre	12–12
25	December 19, 1985	@ Chicago	W 98–92				Chicago Stadium	13–12
26	December 21, 1985	L.A. Lakers	L 84–96				Capital Centre	13–13
27	December 22, 1985	New York	L 93–100				Capital Centre	13–14
28	December 27, 1985; 7:30 p.m. EST	Atlanta	W 111–109	Malone (31)	Roundfield (8)	Johnson (7)	Capital Centre; 8,178	14–14
29	December 28, 1985	@ New Jersey	W 98–93				Brendan Byrne Arena	15–14
30	December 30, 1985	Indiana	L 80–97				Capital Centre	15–15

January: 7–8 (home: 5–2; road: 2–6)

Game	Date	Team	Score	High points	High rebounds	High assists	Location Attendance	Record
31	January 2, 1986	@ New York	W 115–109				Madison Square Garden	16–15
32	January 3, 1986	Milwaukee	L 100–107				Capital Centre	16–16
33	January 5, 1986	@ L.A. Lakers	L 88–118				The Forum	16–17
34	January 6, 1986	@ Sacramento	L 87–106				ARCO Arena	16–18
35	January 8, 1986	@ Phoenix	L 97–109				Arizona Veterans Memorial Coliseum	16–19
36	January 9, 1986	@ Utah	W 95–89				Salt Palace Acord Arena	17–19
37	January 11, 1986	@ Houston	L 86–87				The Summit	17–20
38	January 13, 1986	L.A. Clippers	W 90–77				Capital Centre	18–20
39	January 14, 1986	@ Chicago	W 117–113				Chicago Stadium	19–20
40	January 16, 1986	@ Milwaukee	L 98–114				MECCA Arena	19–21
41	January 17, 1986	New Jersey	W 116–96				Capital Centre	20–21
42	January 19, 1986	Chicago	W 112–98				Capital Centre	21–21
43	January 23, 1986	Phoenix	W 114–112				Capital Centre	22–21
44	January 25, 1986; 7:30 p.m. EST	Atlanta	W 111–103	Robinson (38)	Robinson (11)	Williams (6)	Capital Centre; 7,038	23–21
45	January 29, 1986	@ Indiana	L 88–92				Market Square Arena	23–22
46	January 31, 1986	Boston	L 88–97				Capital Centre	23–23

February: 5–9 (home: 2–1; road: 3–8)

Game	Date	Team	Score	High points	High rebounds	High assists	Location Attendance	Record
47	February 1, 1986	@ Detroit	L 101–116				Pontiac Silverdome	23–24
48	February 5, 1986	@ Boston	L 88–103				Boston Garden	23–25
49	February 6, 1986	Detroit	L 109–111 (OT)				Capital Centre	23–26
All-Star Break
50	February 11, 1986	@ Portland	W 124–116				Memorial Coliseum	24–26
51	February 13, 1986	@ Golden State	L 105–109				Oakland–Alameda County Coliseum Arena	24–27
52	February 15, 1986	@ Seattle	L 106–112				Seattle Center Coliseum	24–28
53	February 17, 1986	@ L.A. Clippers	W 96–94				Los Angeles Memorial Sports Arena	25–28
54	February 18, 1986	@ Denver	L 90–101				McNichols Sports Arena	25–29
55	February 21, 1986	@ Philadelphia	L 87–97				The Spectrum	25–30
56	February 22, 1986	@ Cleveland	W 110–102				Richfield Coliseum	26–30
57	February 24, 1986	New Jersey	W 99–89				Capital Centre	27–30
58	February 25, 1986	@ Indiana	L 87–100				Market Square Arena	27–31
59	February 27, 1986	Golden State	W 114–102				Capital Centre	28–31
60	February 28, 1986	@ Milwaukee	L 84–102				MECCA Arena	28–32

March: 7–8 (home: 6–3; road: 1–5)

Game	Date	Team	Score	High points	High rebounds	High assists	Location Attendance	Record
61	March 2, 1986	Milwaukee	W 125–104				Capital Centre	29–32
62	March 4, 1986	@ New York	L 83–119				Madison Square Garden	29–33
63	March 6, 1986	New York	W 113–111 (OT)				Capital Centre	30–33
64	March 8, 1986	Boston	W 110–108 (OT)				Capital Centre	31–33
65	March 12, 1986	@ Cleveland	W 128–114				Richfield Coliseum	32–33
66	March 14, 1986	Denver	L 91–101				Capital Centre	32–34
67	March 15, 1986	@ Indiana	L 100–105				Market Square Arena	32–35
68	March 17, 1986	New Jersey	L 102–130				Capital Centre	32–36
69	March 18, 1986	@ Milwaukee	L 87–116				MECCA Arena	32–37
70	March 21, 1986	@ Philadelphia	L 105–112				The Spectrum	32–38
71	March 22, 1986	Indiana	W 111–110				Capital Centre	33–38
72	March 24, 1986	Philadelphia	W 100–93				Capital Centre	34–38
73	March 26, 1986; 7:30 p.m. EST	Dallas	W 120–112				Capital Centre; 7,582	35–38
74	March 28, 1986	@ Boston	L 97–116				Boston Garden	35–39
75	March 29, 1986	Houston	L 109–114				Capital Centre	35–40

April: 4–3 (home: 3–1; road: 1–2)

Game	Date	Team	Score	High points	High rebounds	High assists	Location Attendance	Record
76	April 1, 1986; 7:30 p.m. EST	@ Atlanta	L 91–107	Malone (32)	Robinson (10)	Malone, Williams (5)	The Omni; 6,835	35–41
77	April 3, 1986	@ New Jersey	W 120–108				Brendan Byrne Arena	36–41
78	April 4, 1986; 7:30 p.m. EST	Atlanta	W 135–129 (OT)	Robinson (31)	Roundfield (16)	Williams (15)	Capital Centre; 9,113	37–41
79	April 6, 1986	Cleveland	W 106–95				Capital Centre	38–41
80	April 8, 1986	Indiana	L 104–111				Capital Centre	38–42
81	April 11, 1986	@ Chicago	L 103–105				Chicago Stadium	38–43
82	April 13, 1986	Philadelphia	W 98–97				Capital Centre	39–43

1985–86 schedule

=== Playoffs ===
1986 playoff game log
First Round: 2–3 (home: 1–1; road: 1–2)

Game	Date	Team	Score	High points	High rebounds	High assists	Location Attendance	Series
1	April 18, 1986	@ Philadelphia	W 95–94	Jeff Malone (21)	Cliff Robinson (8)	Gus Williams (7)	Spectrum; 9,148	1–0
2	April 20, 1986	@ Philadelphia	L 97–102	Jeff Malone (25)	Cliff Robinson (11)	Gus Williams (12)	Spectrum; 9,057	1–1
3	April 22, 1986	Philadelphia	L 86–91	Gus Williams (28)	Bol, Roundfield (10)	Williams, Roundfield (4)	Capital Centre; 17,137	1–2
4	April 24, 1986	Philadelphia	W 116–111	Cliff Robinson (31)	Manute Bol (12)	Jeff Ruland (5)	Capital Centre; 12,588	2–2
5	April 27, 1986	@ Philadelphia	L 109–134	Cliff Robinson (30)	Cliff Robinson (11)	Gus Williams (6)	Spectrum; 15,162	2–3

1986 schedule

== Awards and records ==
- Manute Bol, NBA All-Defensive Second Team

== See also ==
- 1985–86 NBA season
