= 1985–86 Portland Trail Blazers season =

NBA professional basketball team season

- Head coach: Jack Ramsay
- General manager: Stu Inman
- Owner: Larry Weinberg
- Arena: Memorial Coliseum

Results
- Record: 40–42 (.488)
- Place: Division: 2nd (Pacific); Conference: 6th (Western)
- Playoff finish: First round (lost to Nuggets 1–3)
- Stats at Basketball Reference

Local media
- Television: KOIN
- Radio: KEX

The 1985–86 Portland Trail Blazers season was the 16th season of the Portland Trail Blazers in the National Basketball Association (NBA). The Blazers finished 40–42, sixth in the Western Conference, qualifying for the playoffs for the fourth consecutive year.

Despite their losing record, the Blazers were the only team to defeat the eventual NBA champion Boston Celtics at the Boston Garden during the regular season; the Celtics went 40–1 at home, a record that was unmatched until the San Antonio Spurs in the 2015-16 season.

In the 1986 NBA Playoffs, the Blazers were defeated by the Denver Nuggets in their first-round, best-of-five playoff series, three games to one.

== Draft picks ==
Note: This is not a complete list; only the first two rounds are covered, as well as notable post-second round picks.

Round	Pick	Player	Position	Nationality	School/Club team
1	24	Terry Porter	G	United States	Wisconsin–Stevens Point
2	25	Mike Smrek	C	United States	Clemson
2	39	George Montgomery		United States	Illinois

== Roster ==
1985–86 Portland Trail Blazers roster
Players

Pos.	No.	Player	Height	Weight	DOB	From
C	31	Sam Bowie (injured)	7 ft 1 in (2.16 m)	235 lb (107 kg)	1961-03-17	Kentucky
F	34	Kenny Carr	6 ft 7 in (2.01 m)	220 lb (100 kg)	1955-08-15	NC State
G	20	Steve Colter	6 ft 3 in (1.91 m)	165 lb (75 kg)	1962-07-24	New Mexico State
G	22	Clyde Drexler	6 ft 7 in (2.01 m)	210 lb (95 kg)	1962-06-22	Houston
F	00	Ken Johnson	6 ft 8 in (2.03 m)	240 lb (109 kg)	1962-11-07	Michigan State
C	27	Caldwell Jones	6 ft 11 in (2.11 m)	217 lb (98 kg)	1950-08-04	Albany State
F	25	Jerome Kersey	6 ft 7 in (2.01 m)	215 lb (98 kg)	1962-06-26	Longwood
F	21	Brian Martin	6 ft 9 in (2.06 m)	212 lb (96 kg)	1962-08-18	Kansas
G	4	Jim Paxson	6 ft 6 in (1.98 m)	200 lb (91 kg)	1957-07-09	Dayton
G	30	Terry Porter	6 ft 3 in (1.91 m)	195 lb (88 kg)	1963-04-08	UW–Stevens Point
C	43	Mychal Thompson	6 ft 10 in (2.08 m)	226 lb (103 kg)	1955-01-30	Minnesota
F	55	Kiki Vandeweghe	6 ft 8 in (2.03 m)	220 lb (100 kg)	1958-08-01	UCLA

Coaches
Head coach
- Jack Ramsay
Assistant(s)
- Rick Adelman
- Bucky Buckwalter

Legend
- (DP) Unsigned draft pick
- (FA) Free agent
- (S) Suspended
- Injured

Roster
Updated: May 6, 1986

== Regular season ==
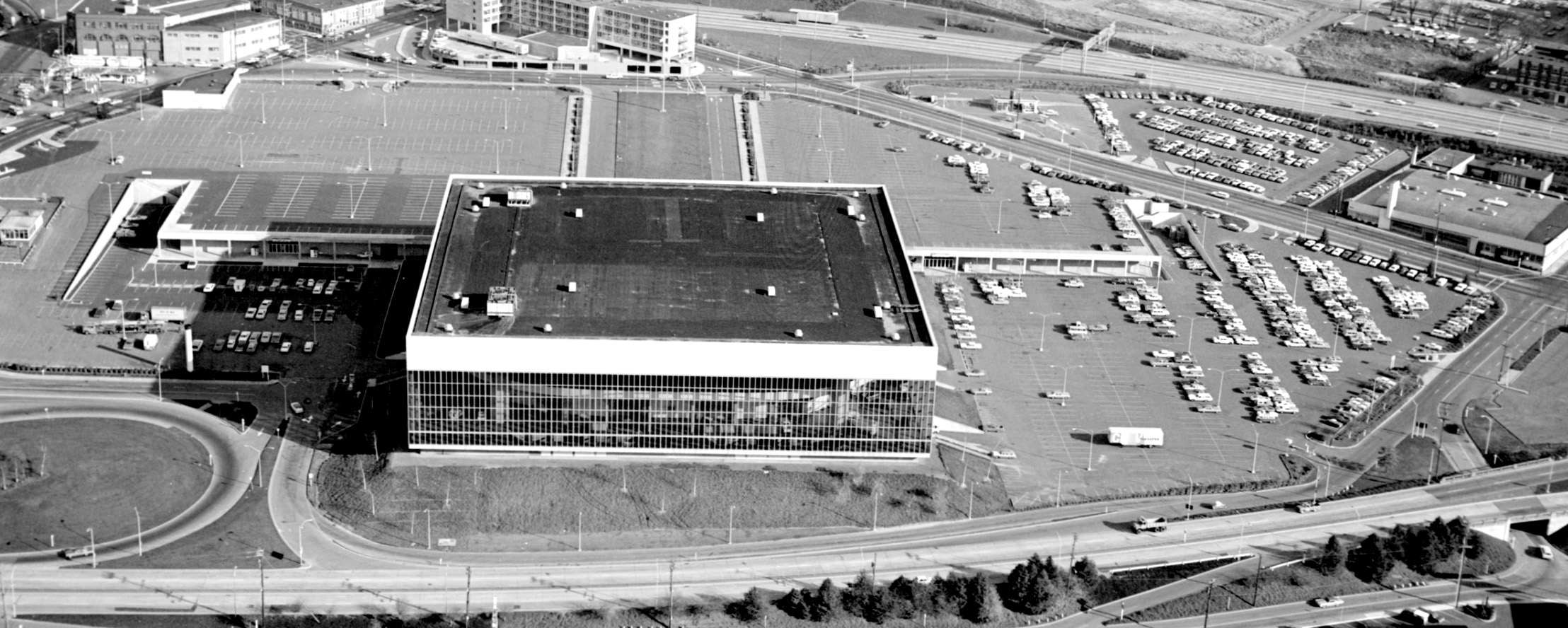
The Trail Blazers played their home games at Veterans Memorial Coliseum.

=== Season standings ===
Pacific Division	W	L	PCT	GB	Home	Road	Div
y-Los Angeles Lakers	62	20	.756	–	35–6	27–14	23–7
x-Portland Trail Blazers	40	42	.488	22	27–14	13–28	18–12
Phoenix Suns	32	50	.390	30	23–18	9–32	16–14
Los Angeles Clippers	32	50	.390	30	22–19	10–31	10–20
Seattle SuperSonics	31	51	.378	31	24–17	7–34	11–19
Golden State Warriors	30	52	.366	32	24–17	6–35	12–18

#	Western Conference				
#	Team	W	L	PCT	GB
1	c-Los Angeles Lakers	62	20	.756	–
2	y-Houston Rockets	51	31	.622	11
3	x-Denver Nuggets	47	35	.573	15
4	x-Dallas Mavericks	44	38	.537	18
5	x-Utah Jazz	42	40	.512	20
6	x-Portland Trail Blazers	40	42	.488	22
7	x-Sacramento Kings	37	45	.451	25
8	x-San Antonio Spurs	35	47	.427	27
9	Phoenix Suns	32	50	.390	30
10	Los Angeles Clippers	32	50	.390	30
11	Seattle SuperSonics	31	51	.378	31
12	Golden State Warriors	30	52	.366	32

z - clinched division title
y - clinched division title
x - clinched playoff spot

== Game log ==
=== Regular season ===
1985–86 game log
Total: 40–42 (home: 27–14; road: 13–28)
October: 2–1 (home: 2–0; road: 0–1)

Game	Date	Team	Score	High points	High rebounds	High assists	Location Attendance	Record
1	October 25, 1985	Phoenix	W 128–123 (OT)				Memorial Coliseum	1–0
2	October 27, 1985	Golden State	W 116–99				Memorial Coliseum	2–0
3	October 29, 1985	@ L.A. Clippers	L 113–119				Los Angeles Memorial Sports Arena	2–1

November: 10–6 (home: 7–3; road: 3–3)

Game	Date	Team	Score	High points	High rebounds	High assists	Location Attendance	Record
4	November 2, 1985	Utah	W 128–108				Memorial Coliseum	3–1
5	November 3, 1985	New York	W 110–96				Memorial Coliseum	4–1
6	November 5, 1985	@ Houston	L 113–127				The Summit	4–2
7	November 6, 1985	@ Dallas	W 111–109				Reunion Arena	5–2
8	November 8, 1985	Seattle	W 92–88				Memorial Coliseum	6–2
9	November 10, 1985	Cleveland	W 110–107				Memorial Coliseum	7–2
10	November 12, 1985	Sacramento	W 126–115				Memorial Coliseum	8–2
11	November 14, 1985	@ L.A. Lakers	L 102–114				The Forum	8–3
12	November 15, 1985	@ Utah	L 118–133				Salt Palace Acord Arena	8–4
13	November 17, 1985	Milwaukee	L 104–117				Memorial Coliseum	8–5
14	November 19, 1985	New Jersey	L 102–108				Memorial Coliseum	8–6
15	November 21, 1985	@ L.A. Clippers	W 112–108				Los Angeles Memorial Sports Arena	9–6
16	November 23, 1985	L.A. Lakers	L 113–130				Memorial Coliseum	9–7
17	November 24, 1985	Houston	W 125–118				Memorial Coliseum	10–7
18	November 27, 1985	@ Phoenix	W 110–93				Arizona Veterans Memorial Coliseum	11–7
19	November 29, 1985	Chicago	W 122–107				Memorial Coliseum	12–7

December: 8–8 (home: 4–1; road: 4–7)

Game	Date	Team	Score	High points	High rebounds	High assists	Location Attendance	Record
20	December 1, 1985	San Antonio	L 106–117				Memorial Coliseum	12–8
21	December 3, 1985	@ Washington	L 111–115				Capital Centre	12–9
22	December 4, 1985; 4:30 p.m. PST	@ Atlanta	L 98–109	Colter (20)	Jones (9)	Porter (4)	The Omni; 4,113	12–10
23	December 6, 1985	@ Boston	W 121–103				Boston Garden	13–10
24	December 7, 1985	@ New Jersey	L 106–118				Brendan Byrne Arena	13–11
25	December 10, 1985	Golden State	W 94–92				Memorial Coliseum	14–11
26	December 11, 1985	@ Utah	L 111–119				Salt Palace Acord Arena	14–12
27	December 13, 1985	@ Golden State	W 127–124 (OT)				Oakland-Alameda County Coliseum Arena	15–12
28	December 17, 1985	@ San Antonio	L 118–126				HemisFair Arena	14–14
29	December 19, 1985	@ Denver	L 118–123				McNichols Sports Arena	15–14
30	December 21, 1985	@ Seattle	W 114–97				Seattle Center Coliseum	16–14
31	December 22, 1985	Denver	W 121–114				Memorial Coliseum	17–14
32	December 25, 1985	L.A. Clippers	W 121–107				Memorial Coliseum	18–14
33	December 27, 1985	@ Dallas	W 142–133 (OT)				Reunion Arena	19–14
34	December 28, 1985	@ Houston	L 108–118				The Summit	19–15
35	December 30, 1985	San Antonio	W 125–110				Memorial Coliseum	20–15

January: 8–7 (home: 4–4; road: 4–3)

Game	Date	Team	Score	High points	High rebounds	High assists	Location Attendance	Record
36	January 1, 1986	Philadelphia	L 119–121 (OT)				Memorial Coliseum	20–16
37	January 3, 1986	Phoenix	W 133–104				Memorial Coliseum	21–16
38	January 5, 1986	Golden State	W 136–120				Memorial Coliseum	22–16
39	January 8, 1986	@ L.A. Lakers	L 121–125				The Forum	22–17
40	January 10, 1986	@ Milwaukee	L 89–95				MECCA Arena	22–18
41	January 11, 1986	@ New York	W 109–106				Madison Square Garden	23–18
42	January 14, 1986	@ Cleveland	W 120–108				Richfield Coliseum	24–18
43	January 15, 1986	@ Indiana	W 109–104				Market Square Arena	25–18
44	January 18, 1986	Phoenix	W 112–87				Memorial Coliseum	26–18
45	January 19, 1986	San Antonio	L 105–116				Memorial Coliseum	26–19
46	January 23, 1986	Seattle	W 117–107 (2OT)				Memorial Coliseum	27–19
47	January 25, 1986	@ Sacramento	W 129–125				ARCO Arena	28–19
48	January 26, 1986	Sacramento	L 116–121				Memorial Coliseum	28–20
49	January 28, 1986	@ Phoenix	L 130–136				Arizona Veterans Memorial Coliseum	28–21
50	January 30, 1986	L.A. Lakers	L 94–118				Memorial Coliseum	28–22

February: 1–12 (home: 1–5; road: 0–7)

Game	Date	Team	Score	High points	High rebounds	High assists	Location Attendance	Record
51	February 1, 1986	L.A. Clippers	W 156–121				Memorial Coliseum	29–22
52	February 4, 1986	@ Denver	L 118–119				McNichols Sports Arena	29–23
53	February 6, 1986	Dallas	L 111–115				Memorial Coliseum	29–24
All-Star Break
54	February 11, 1986	Washington	L 116–124				Memorial Coliseum	29–25
55	February 13, 1986	@ L.A. Clippers	L 113–118				Los Angeles Memorial Sports Arena	29–26
56	February 14, 1986	Boston	L 119–120 (OT)				Memorial Coliseum	29–27
57	February 16, 1986; 5:00 p.m. PST	Atlanta	L 101–110	Vandeweghe (21)	Kersey, Thompson (10)	Drexler, Paxson (6)	Memorial Coliseum; 12,666	29–28
58	February 19, 1986	@ Philadelphia	L 133–153				The Spectrum	29–29
59	February 21, 1986	@ Chicago	L 96–108				Chicago Stadium	29–30
60	February 22, 1986	@ Detroit	L 106–113				Pontiac Silverdome	29–31
61	February 24, 1986	Denver	L 113–119				Memorial Coliseum	29–32
62	February 26, 1986	@ Phoenix	L 112–113				Arizona Veterans Memorial Coliseum	29–33
63	February 27, 1986	@ Seattle	L 94–107				Seattle Center Coliseum	29–34

March: 7–5 (home: 7–0; road: 0–5)

Game	Date	Team	Score	High points	High rebounds	High assists	Location Attendance	Record
64	March 1, 1986	Houston	W 117–112				Memorial Coliseum	30–34
65	March 4, 1986	Indiana	W 102–99				Memorial Coliseum	31–34
66	March 7, 1986	Dallas	W 125–114				Memorial Coliseum	32–34
67	March 8, 1986	Utah	W 104–90				Memorial Coliseum	33–34
68	March 13, 1986	@ Houston	L 118–126				The Summit	33–35
69	March 14, 1986	@ Dallas	L 118–129				Reunion Arena	33–36
70	March 16, 1986	Detroit	W 119–109				Memorial Coliseum	34–36
71	March 18, 1986	@ L.A. Lakers	L 122–128				The Forum	34–37
72	March 21, 1986	Seattle	W 115–108				Memorial Coliseum	35–37
73	March 23, 1986	Sacramento	W 112–102				Memorial Coliseum	36–37
74	March 25, 1986	@ Sacramento	L 99–116				ARCO Arena	36–38
75	March 29, 1986	@ Golden State	L 129–130				Oakland-Alameda County Coliseum Arena	36–39

April: 4–3 (home: 2–1; road: 2–2)

Game	Date	Team	Score	High points	High rebounds	High assists	Location Attendance	Record
76	April 1, 1986	Denver	W 127–110				Memorial Coliseum	37–39
77	April 2, 1986	@ Seattle	W 121–109				Seattle Center Coliseum	38–39
78	April 5, 1986	@ Utah	L 103–114				Salt Palace Acord Arena	38–40
79	April 8, 1986	L.A. Lakers	L 114–120				Memorial Coliseum	38–41
80	April 10, 1986	L.A. Clippers	W 115–100				Memorial Coliseum	39–41
81	April 11, 1986	@ Golden State	W 131–130				Oakland-Alameda County Coliseum Arena	40–41
82	April 13, 1986	@ San Antonio	L 118–123				HemisFair Arena	40–42

1985–86 schedule

=== Playoffs ===
1986 playoff game log
First round: 1–3 (home: 0–2; road: 1–1)

Game	Date	Team	Score	High points	High rebounds	High assists	Location Attendance	Series
1	April 18, 1986	@ Denver	L 126–133	Kiki VanDeWeghe (28)	Kenny Carr (9)	Steve Colter (6)	McNichols Sports Arena; 13,209	0–1
2	April 20, 1986	@ Denver	W 108–106	Kiki VanDeWeghe (36)	Kenny Carr (11)	Clyde Drexler (8)	McNichols Sports Arena; 11,724	1–1
3	April 22, 1986	Denver	L 104–115	Kiki VanDeWeghe (24)	Kenny Carr (15)	Clyde Drexler (7)	Memorial Coliseum; 12,666	1–2
4	April 24, 1986	Denver	L 112–116	Kiki VanDeWeghe (18)	Kenny Carr (18)	Steve Colter (8)	Memorial Coliseum; 12,666	1–3

1986 schedule

== Player statistics ==
Legend
GP	Games played	GS	Games started	MPG	Minutes per game
FG%	Field-goal percentage	3P%	3-point field-goal percentage	FT%	Free-throw percentage
RPG	Rebounds per game	APG	Assists per game	SPG	Steals per game
BPG	Blocks per game	PPG	Points per game

=== Season ===
Player	GP	GS	MPG	FG%	3FG%	FT%	RPG	APG	SPG	BPG	PPG

=== Playoffs ===
Player	GP	GS	MPG	FG%	3FG%	FT%	RPG	APG	SPG	BPG	PPG

== Awards and honors ==
- Clyde Drexler, NBA All-Star
- Clyde Drexler, NBA Player of the Week (December 30–January 5)
