= 1985–86 Seattle SuperSonics season =

NBA professional basketball team season

- Head coach: Bernie Bickerstaff
- General manager: Lenny Wilkens
- Owner: Barry Ackerley
- Arena: Seattle Center Coliseum

Results
- Record: 31–51 (.378)
- Place: Division: 5th (Pacific); Conference: 11th (Western)
- Playoff finish: Did not qualify
- Stats at Basketball Reference

Local media
- Television: KVOS-TV
- Radio: KIRO

The 1985–86 Seattle SuperSonics season was the SuperSonics' 19th season in the NBA.

The SuperSonics finished the season in eleventh place in the Western Conference with a 31–51 record, the same as the previous year.

== Offseason ==
=== Draft ===
Round	Pick	Player	Position	Nationality	College
1	4	Xavier McDaniel	SF/PF	United States	Wichita State
3	53	Rolando Lamb	G	United States	VCU
4	75	Alex Stivrins	SF/PF	United States	Colorado
5	97	Lou Stefanovic	F	Yugoslavia	Illinois State
6	122	Earl Walker	F	United States	Mercer
7	144	Mike Phelps	G	United States	Alcorn State

== Roster ==
Number	Name	Position	Height	Experience	College
33	Frank Brickowski	Center	6–9	1 yr.	Pennysalvania State
24	Tom Chambers	Power forward	6–10	4 yr.	Utah
15	Gerald Henderson	Point guard	6–2	6 yr.	Virginia Commonwealth
55	Rod Higgins	Small forward	6–7	3 yr.	California State, Fresno
52	George Johnson	Center	6–11	12 yr.	Dillard
35	Brian Martin	Power forward	6–9	Rookie	University of Kansas
40	Tim McCormick	Center	6–11	1 yr.	Michigan
34	Xavier McDaniel	Small forward	6–7	Rookie	Wichita State
25	Michael Phelps	Shooting guard	6–4	Rookie	Alcorn State University
51	David Pope	Small forward	6–7	1 yr.	Norfolk State
43	Jack Sikma	Center	6–11	8 yr.	Illinois Wesleyan University
14	Ricky Sobers	Shooting guard	6–3	10 yr.	Nevada, Las Vegas
42	Alex Stivrins	Small forward	6–8	Rookie	Creighton, Colorado
23	Danny Vranes	Small forward	6–7	4 yr.	Utah
4	Al Wood	Shooting guard	6–6	4 yr.	North Carolina
22	Danny Young	Point guard	6–3	1 yr.	Wake Forest

Staff management

- Bob Kloppenburg, Assistant coach
- Lorin Miller, Assistant coach

=== Salaries ===
Player	Salary
Jack Sikma	$1,600,000
Tom Chambers	$800,000
Xavier McDaniel	$525,000
Al Wood	$450,000
Ricky Sobers	$425,000
Danny Vranes	$400,000
Gerald Henderson	$350,000
Tim McCormick	$228,333
Rod Higgins	$190,000
Danny Young	$75,000
George Johnson	$70,000
Michael Phelps	$70,000

== Standings ==
=== Division ===
Pacific Division	W	L	PCT	GB	Home	Road	Div
y-Los Angeles Lakers	62	20	.756	–	35–6	27–14	23–7
x-Portland Trail Blazers	40	42	.488	22	27–14	13–28	18–12
Phoenix Suns	32	50	.390	30	23–18	9–32	16–14
Los Angeles Clippers	32	50	.390	30	22–19	10–31	10–20
Seattle SuperSonics	31	51	.378	31	24–17	7–34	11–19
Golden State Warriors	30	52	.366	32	24–17	6–35	12–18

=== Conference ===
#	Western Conference				
#	Team	W	L	PCT	GB
1	c-Los Angeles Lakers	62	20	.756	–
2	y-Houston Rockets	51	31	.622	11
3	x-Denver Nuggets	47	35	.573	15
4	x-Dallas Mavericks	44	38	.537	18
5	x-Utah Jazz	42	40	.512	20
6	x-Portland Trail Blazers	40	42	.488	22
7	x-Sacramento Kings	37	45	.451	25
8	x-San Antonio Spurs	35	47	.427	27
9	Phoenix Suns	32	50	.390	30
10	Los Angeles Clippers	32	50	.390	30
11	Seattle SuperSonics	31	51	.378	31
12	Golden State Warriors	30	52	.366	32

z - clinched division title
y - clinched division title
x - clinched playoff spot

== Game log ==
#	Date	Opponent	Score	Record
1	October 26	@ Dallas	L 95–101	0–1
2	October 29	@ Houston	L 99–111	0–2
3	October 31	@ Denver	L 73–90	0–3
4	November 2	Chicago	W 118–100	1–3
5	November 5	New York	W 84–80	2–3
6	November 6	@ Golden State	L 101–105	2–4
7	November 8	@ Portland	L 88–92	2–5
8	November 9	@ Sacramento	L 93–98	2–6
9	November 12	Dallas	W 109–90	3–6
10	November 13	@ L. A. Clippers	W 93–89	4–6
11	November 15	@ Phoenix	L 99–117	4–7
12	November 16	@ San Antonio	L 95–97 (OT)	4–8
13	November 20	Milwaukee	L 106–116	4–9
14	November 22	Houston	W 122–103	5–9
15	November 24	Denver	W 110–84	6–9
16	November 26	L. A. Clippers	W 131–99	7–9
17	November 29	@ L. A. Lakers	L 107–108	7–10
18	November 30	@ Denver	W 131–123 (2OT)	8–10
19	December 3	San Antonio	W 123–103	9–10
20	December 5	@ Cleveland	L 97–100	9–11
21	December 6	@ Washington	L 109–115	9–12
22	December 8	@ Philadelphia	W 105–100	10–12
23	December 10	@ Milwaukee	L 98–117	10–13
24	December 11	@ Atlanta	L 97–105	10–14
25	December 13	L. A. Clippers	W 114–95	11–14
26	December 15	@ Golden State	L 105–112	11–15
27	December 17	Phoenix	L 99–104	11–16
28	December 19	Detroit	L 97–99	11–17
29	December 21	Portland	L 97–114	11–18
30	December 27	Golden State	W 114–102	12–18
31	December 28	L. A. Clippers	L 106–111	12–19
32	December 30	@ Utah	L 105–107	12–20
33	January 3	Denver	W 117–107	13–20
34	January 6	Phoenix	L 97–114	13–21
35	January 7	Utah	W 91–84	14–21
36	January 9	@ Denver	L 90–94	14–22
37	January 11	L. A. Lakers	W 105–99	15–22
38	January 13	Dallas	L 89–90	15–23
39	January 15	@ L. A. Clippers	L 103–110	15–24
40	January 17	@ Phoenix	L 100–103	15–25
41	January 18	@ Sacramento	L 96–98 (OT)	15–26
42	January 21	Houston	L 96–100	15–27
43	January 23	@ Portland	L 107–117 (2OT)	15–28
44	January 25	New Jersey	W 106–99	16–28
45	January 28	Philadelphia	L 99–106	16–29
46	January 30	@ New Jersey	W 89–82	17–29
47	January 31	@ Indiana	L 94–101	17–30
48	February 2	@ Boston	L 101–114	17–31
49	February 4	@ Indiana	L 119–124 (OT)	17–32
50	February 6	@ Sacramento	L 106–115	17–33
51	February 11	Utah	W 105–92	18–33
52	February 13	Boston	L 98–107	18–34
53	February 15	Washington	W 112–106	19–34
54	February 17	Atlanta	W 100–87	20–34
55	February 19	@ Detroit	L 113–118	20–35
56	February 21	@ New York	L 104–117	20–36
57	February 22	@ Chicago	L 125–129 (3OT)	20–37
58	February 25	Sacramento	L 100–102	20–38
59	February 27	Portland	W 107–94	21–38
60	March 3	Houston	W 118–105	22–38
61	March 5	Indiana	L 112–120	22–39
62	March 7	Cleveland	W 120–106	23–39
63	March 9	L. A. Lakers	L 106–108	23–40
64	March 10	@ Golden State	W 111–108	24–40
65	March 12	@ L. A. Clippers	L 96–100	24–41
66	March 13	@ L. A. Lakers	L 92–105	24–42
67	March 16	San Antonio	W 129–115	25–42
68	March 18	Utah	L 104–107	25–43
69	March 20	Golden State	W 116–104	26–43
70	March 21	@ Portland	L 108–115	26–44
71	March 23	@ San Antonio	W 107–104	27–44
72	March 24	@ Utah	L 108–116	27–45
73	March 26	@ Phoenix	L 107–120	27–46
74	March 27	Sacramento	L 101–103	27–47
75	March 29	L. A. Lakers	W 88–87	28–47
76	March 30	Phoenix	W 103–89	29–47
77	April 1	@ L. A. Lakers	L 104–109	29–48
78	April 2	Portland	L 109–121	29–49
79	April 5	@ Dallas	W 111–109	30–49
80	April 8	@ Houston	L 95–109	30–50
81	April 10	Dallas	L 109–115	30–51
82	April 12	Golden State	W 121–101	31–51

== Player statistics ==
Legend
GP	Games played	GS	Games started	MPG	Minutes per game
FG%	Field-goal percentage	3P%	3-point field-goal percentage	FT%	Free-throw percentage
RPG	Rebounds per game	APG	Assists per game	SPG	Steals per game
BPG	Blocks per game	PPG	Points per game

Player	GP	GS	MPG	FG%	3FG%	FT%	RPG	APG	SPG	BPG	PPG
Frank Brickowski	40	2	311	.517		.667	6.3	2.4	1.3	0.8	9.0
Tom Chambers	66	26	2019	.466	.271	.836	7.7	2.4	1.0	0.7	21.8
Gerald Henderson	82	82	2568	.482	.346	.830	2.6	6.8	1.9	0.2	15.0
Rod Higgins	12	0	94	.333	.250	.600	4.6	2.3	0.8	0.4	8.4
George Johnson	41	0	264	.522		.688	8.2	1.8	0.8	5.0	4.8
Brian Martin	3	0	7	.500			20.6	0.0	0.0	5.1	10.3
Tim McCormick	77	42	1705	.570	.500	.713	8.5	1.8	0.4	0.6	14.4
Xavier McDaniel	82	80	2706	.490	.200	.687	8.7	2.6	1.3	0.5	18.7
Michael Phelps	70	18	880	.409	.083	.595	3.6	2.9	1.8	0.0	11.4
David Pope	11	0	74	.450	1.000	.500	5.4	1.9	1.0	0.5	10.2
Jack Sikma	80	78	2790	.462	.000	.864	9.7	3.9	1.2	0.9	17.7
Ricky Sobers	78	0	1279	.444	.302	.880	2.8	5.1	1.2	0.1	17.0
Alex Stivrins	3	0	14	.250		.250	7.7	2.6	0.0	0.0	7.7
Danny Vranes	80	19	1569	.461	.000	.520	6.4	1.6	1.4	0.7	6.9
Al Wood	78	34	1749	.435	.135	.782	5.0	2.3	1.2	0.4	18.6
Danny Young	82	29	1901	.506	.324	.849	2.3	5.7	2.1	0.2	10.8

== Awards and records ==
- Xavier McDaniel, All-Rookie 1st Team

== See also ==
- 1985-86 NBA season
