= 1985–86 Utah Jazz season =

NBA professional basketball team season

- Head coach: Frank Layden
- General manager: Frank Layden
- Owners: Sam Battistone; Larry H. Miller
- Arena: Salt Palace Acord Arena

Results
- Record: 42–40 (.512)
- Place: Division: 4th (Midwest); Conference: 5th (Western)
- Playoff finish: First round (lost to Mavericks 1–3)
- Stats at Basketball Reference

Local media
- Television: KSL-TV
- Radio: KSL

The 1985–86 Utah Jazz season saw the Jazz draft Karl Malone. This marked the beginning of the Stockton and Malone era.

== Draft picks ==
Round	Pick	Player	Position	Nationality	College
1	13	Karl Malone	PF	United States	Louisiana Tech
2	37	Carey Scurry	SF	United States	Long Island
4	83	Delaney Rudd	PG	United States	Wake Forest
5	105	Ray Hall		United States	Canisius
6	129	Jim Miller		United States	Virginia
7	151	Mike Wacker		United States	Texas-San Antonio

== Roster ==
Utah Jazz roster
Players

Pos.	No.	Player	Height	Weight	DOB	From
F/C	41	Thurl Bailey	6 ft 11 in (2.11 m)	215 lb (98 kg)		NC State
F/C	45	Jeff Cook	6 ft 10 in (2.08 m)	215 lb (98 kg)		Idaho State
SF	4	Adrian Dantley	6 ft 5 in (1.96 m)	208 lb (94 kg)		Notre Dame
C	53	Mark Eaton	7 ft 4 in (2.24 m)	275 lb (125 kg)		UCLA
PG	14	Rickey Green	6 ft 0 in (1.83 m)	170 lb (77 kg)		Michigan
G	35	Darrell Griffith	6 ft 4 in (1.93 m)	190 lb (86 kg)		Louisville
G	20	Bob Hansen	6 ft 6 in (1.98 m)	190 lb (86 kg)		Iowa
C	50	Steve Hayes	7 ft 0 in (2.13 m)	205 lb (93 kg)		Idaho State
PF	43	Marc Iavaroni	6 ft 8 in (2.03 m)	210 lb (95 kg)		Virginia
F	32	Karl Malone	6 ft 9 in (2.06 m)	250 lb (113 kg)		Louisiana Tech
PF	33	Fred Roberts	6 ft 10 in (2.08 m)	218 lb (99 kg)		BYU
F	22	Carey Scurry	6 ft 7 in (2.01 m)	188 lb (85 kg)		Long Island
G	12	John Stockton	6 ft 1 in (1.85 m)	170 lb (77 kg)		Gonzaga

Coaches
Head coach
- Frank Layden
Assistant(s)
- Jerry Sloan

Legend
- (DP) Unsigned draft pick
- (FA) Free agent
- (S) Suspended
- Injured

== Regular season ==
=== Season standings ===
Midwest Division	W	L	PCT	GB	Home	Road	Div
y-Houston Rockets	51	31	.622	–	36–5	15–26	20–10
x-Denver Nuggets	47	35	.573	4	34–7	13–28	15–15
x-Dallas Mavericks	44	38	.537	7	26–15	18–23	16–14
x-Utah Jazz	42	40	.512	9	27–14	15–26	15–15
x-Sacramento Kings	37	45	.451	14	25–16	12–29	15–15
x-San Antonio Spurs	35	47	.427	16	21–20	14–27	9–21

#	Western Conference				
#	Team	W	L	PCT	GB
1	c-Los Angeles Lakers	62	20	.756	–
2	y-Houston Rockets	51	31	.622	11
3	x-Denver Nuggets	47	35	.573	15
4	x-Dallas Mavericks	44	38	.537	18
5	x-Utah Jazz	42	40	.512	20
6	x-Portland Trail Blazers	40	42	.488	22
7	x-Sacramento Kings	37	45	.451	25
8	x-San Antonio Spurs	35	47	.427	27
9	Phoenix Suns	32	50	.390	30
10	Los Angeles Clippers	32	50	.390	30
11	Seattle SuperSonics	31	51	.378	31
12	Golden State Warriors	30	52	.366	32

== Game log ==
=== Regular season ===
1985–86 game log
Total: 42–40 (home: 27–14; road: 15–26)
October: 1–2 (home: 1–1; road: 0–1)

Game	Date	Team	Score	High points	High rebounds	High assists	Location Attendance	Record
1	October 25, 1985	Houston	L 108–112				Salt Palace Acord Arena	0–1
2	October 29, 1985	@ San Antonio	L 112–124				HemisFair Arena	0–2
3	October 30, 1985	San Antonio	W 102–100				Salt Palace Acord Arena	1–2

November: 11–6 (home: 6–3; road: 5–3)

Game	Date	Team	Score	High points	High rebounds	High assists	Location Attendance	Record
4	November 1, 1985	Phoenix	W 121–110				Salt Palace Acord Arena	2–2
5	November 2, 1985	@ Portland	L 108–128				Memorial Coliseum	2–3
6	November 5, 1985	Golden State	W 118–99				Salt Palace Acord Arena	3–3
7	November 7, 1985	L.A. Lakers	L 106–116				Salt Palace Acord Arena	3–4
8	November 9, 1985	Cleveland	W 121–114				Salt Palace Acord Arena	4–4
9	November 12, 1985	@ L.A. Lakers	L 110–119				The Forum	4–5
10	November 13, 1985	Dallas	L 100–115				Salt Palace Acord Arena	4–6
11	November 15, 1985	Portland	W 133–118				Salt Palace Acord Arena	5–6
12	November 16, 1985	@ Sacramento	W 100–96				ARCO Arena	6–6
13	November 20, 1985	@ Boston	L 106–115 (OT)				Boston Garden	6–7
14	November 22, 1985	@ Cleveland	W 121–113				Richfield Coliseum	7–7
15	November 23, 1985; 5:30 p.m. MST	@ Atlanta	W 116–106	Dantley (41)	Eaton, Malone (10)	Green (6)	The Omni; 6,115	8–7
16	November 25, 1985	@ Indiana	W 102–101				Market Square Arena	9–7
17	November 27, 1985	Chicago	W 114–96				Salt Palace Acord Arena	10–7
18	November 29, 1985	Denver	L 114–129				Salt Palace Acord Arena	10–8
19	November 30, 1985	@ Golden State	W 89–88				Oakland-Alameda County Coliseum Arena	11–8

December: 6–8 (home: 4–2; road: 2–6)

Game	Date	Team	Score	High points	High rebounds	High assists	Location Attendance	Record
20	December 2, 1985	Golden State	W 103–100				Salt Palace Acord Arena	12–8
21	December 4, 1985	L.A. Lakers	L 127–131 (OT)				Salt Palace Acord Arena	12–9
22	December 6, 1985	@ Phoenix	L 92–111				Arizona Veterans Memorial Coliseum	12–10
23	December 7, 1985	@ L.A. Clippers	W 131–91				Los Angeles Memorial Sports Arena	13–10
24	December 10, 1985	@ Houston	L 105–134				The Summit	13–11
25	December 11, 1985	Portland	W 119–111				Salt Palace Acord Arena	14–11
26	December 14, 1985	Houston	W 114–100				Salt Palace Acord Arena	15–11
27	December 17, 1985	@ Washington	W 106–98				Capital Centre	16–11
28	December 18, 1985	@ New Jersey	L 98–113				Brendan Byrne Arena	16–12
29	December 20, 1985	@ Philadelphia	L 105–112				The Spectrum	16–13
30	December 21, 1985	@ Chicago	L 104–117				Chicago Stadium	16–14
31	December 26, 1985	@ Houston	L 99–106				The Summit	16–15
32	December 28, 1985	Boston	L 108–110				Salt Palace Acord Arena	16–16
33	December 30, 1985	Seattle	W 107–105				Salt Palace Acord Arena	17–16

January: 7–9 (home: 5–3; road: 2–6)

Game	Date	Team	Score	High points	High rebounds	High assists	Location Attendance	Record
34	January 3, 1986	@ L.A. Lakers	L 101–110				The Forum	17–17
35	January 4, 1986	@ Dallas	L 106–119				Reunion Arena	17–18
36	January 7, 1986	@ Seattle	L 84–91				Seattle Center Coliseum	17–19
37	January 9, 1986	Washington	L 89–95				Salt Palace Acord Arena	17–20
38	January 11, 1986	@ Denver	L 106–114				McNichols Sports Arena	17–21
39	January 12, 1986	@ San Antonio	W 106–102				HemisFair Arena	18–21
40	January 14, 1986	@ Houston	W 105–102				The Summit	19–21
41	January 15, 1986	@ Golden State	L 104–150				Oakland-Alameda County Coliseum Arena	19–22
42	January 17, 1986	Dallas	W 139–112				Salt Palace Acord Arena	20–22
43	January 18, 1986	@ L.A. Clippers	L 97–131				Los Angeles Memorial Sports Arena	20–23
44	January 21, 1986	Denver	W 117–114 (OT)				Salt Palace Acord Arena	21–23
45	January 23, 1986	New Jersey	L 105–106				Salt Palace Acord Arena	21–24
46	January 25, 1986	L.A. Clippers	W 130–90				Salt Palace Acord Arena	22–24
47	January 27, 1986	Milwaukee	L 103–127				Salt Palace Acord Arena	22–25
48	January 29, 1986	Philadelphia	W 107–86				Salt Palace Acord Arena	23–25
49	January 31, 1986	Sacramento	W 103–101				Salt Palace Acord Arena	24–25

February: 6–5 (home: 5–1; road: 1–4)

Game	Date	Team	Score	High points	High rebounds	High assists	Location Attendance	Record
50	February 2, 1986	@ Dallas	L 97–100				Reunion Arena	24–26
51	February 3, 1986	San Antonio	L 104–112				Salt Palace Acord Arena	24–27
52	February 6, 1986	New York	W 119–101				Salt Palace Acord Arena	25–27
All-Star Break
53	February 11, 1986	@ Seattle	L 92–105				Seattle Center Coliseum	25–28
54	February 13, 1986	@ Milwaukee	L 106–113				MECCA Arena	25–29
55	February 15, 1986	@ New York	W 104–97				Madison Square Garden	26–29
56	February 17, 1986	@ Detroit	L 96–117				Pontiac Silverdome	26–30
57	February 19, 1986; 7:30 p.m. MST	Atlanta	W 109–105	Dantley (31)	Malone (12)	Green, Malone, Scurry (3)	Salt Palace Acord Arena; 12,654	27–30
58	February 22, 1986	Phoenix	W 105–97				Salt Palace Acord Arena	28–30
59	February 25, 1986	Houston	W 100–97				Salt Palace Acord Arena	29–30
60	February 27, 1986	Indiana	W 109–92				Salt Palace Acord Arena	30–30

March: 9–7 (home: 6–2; road: 3–5)

Game	Date	Team	Score	High points	High rebounds	High assists	Location Attendance	Record
61	March 1, 1986	Sacramento	W 110–94				Salt Palace Acord Arena	31–30
62	March 4, 1986	@ Sacramento	L 92–94				ARCO Arena	31–31
63	March 5, 1986	@ L.A. Lakers	L 84–130				The Forum	31–32
64	March 7, 1986	@ Phoenix	W 105–103				Arizona Veterans Memorial Coliseum	32–32
65	March 8, 1986	@ Portland	L 90–104				Memorial Coliseum	32–33
66	March 12, 1986	Golden State	L 111–118				Salt Palace Acord Arena	32–34
67	March 14, 1986	San Antonio	W 146–121				Salt Palace Acord Arena	33–34
68	March 15, 1986	@ Dallas	L 98–108				Reunion Arena	33–35
69	March 17, 1986	Detroit	W 107–106				Salt Palace Acord Arena	34–35
70	March 18, 1986	@ Seattle	W 107–104				Seattle Center Coliseum	35–35
71	March 20, 1986	Dallas	L 107–114				Salt Palace Acord Arena	35–36
72	March 22, 1986	Phoenix	W 119–109				Salt Palace Acord Arena	36–36
73	March 24, 1986	Seattle	W 116–108				Salt Palace Acord Arena	37–36
74	March 26, 1986	Denver	W 116–101				Salt Palace Acord Arena	38–36
75	March 28, 1986	@ Denver	L 120–128				McNichols Sports Arena	38–37
76	March 29, 1986	@ San Antonio	W 110–102				HemisFair Arena	39–37

April: 3–3 (home: 1–2; road: 2–1)

Game	Date	Team	Score	High points	High rebounds	High assists	Location Attendance	Record
77	April 1, 1986	L.A. Clippers	L 109–113				Salt Palace Acord Arena	39–38
78	April 2, 1986	@ L.A. Clippers	L 94–97				Los Angeles Memorial Sports Arena	39–39
79	April 5, 1986	Portland	W 114–103				Salt Palace Acord Arena	40–39
80	April 9, 1986	Sacramento	L 108–113				Salt Palace Acord Arena	40–40
81	April 10, 1986	@ Sacramento	W 119–108				ARCO Arena	41–40
82	April 12, 1986	@ Denver	W 117–99				McNichols Sports Arena	42–40

1985–86 schedule

== Playoffs ==
1986 playoff game log
First Round: 1–3 (home: 1–1; road: 0–2)

Game	Date	Team	Score	High points	High rebounds	High assists	Location Attendance	Series
1	April 18, 1986	@ Dallas	L 93–101	Karl Malone (23)	Karl Malone (13)	Rickey Green (12)	Reunion Arena; 17,007	0–1
2	April 20, 1986	@ Dallas	L 106–113	Karl Malone (31)	Mark Eaton (11)	Rickey Green (8)	Reunion Arena; 17,007	0–2
3	April 23, 1986	Dallas	W 100–98	Rickey Green (32)	Thurl Bailey (14)	Rickey Green (8)	Salt Palace Acord Arena; 11,635	1–2
4	April 25, 1986	Dallas	L 113–117	Thurl Bailey (24)	Mark Eaton (12)	Rickey Green (10)	Salt Palace Acord Arena; 12,683	1–3

1986 schedule

== Player statistics ==
Legend
GP	Games played	GS	Games started	MPG	Minutes per game
FG%	Field-goal percentage	3P%	3-point field-goal percentage	FT%	Free-throw percentage
RPG	Rebounds per game	APG	Assists per game	SPG	Steals per game
BPG	Blocks per game	PPG	Points per game

=== Season ===
Player	GP	GS	MPG	FG%	3FG%	FT%	RPG	APG	SPG	BPG	PPG
Thurl Bailey											
Jeff Cook											
Adrian Dantley											
Mark Eaton											
Rickey Green											
Bob Hansen											
Steve Hayes											
Marc Iavaroni											
Karl Malone											
Pace Mannion											
Fred Roberts											
Carey Scurry											
John Stockton											
Jeff Wilkins											

=== Playoffs ===
Player	GP	GS	MPG	FG%	3FG%	FT%	RPG	APG	SPG	BPG	PPG
Thurl Bailey											
Jeff Cook											
Mark Eaton											
Rickey Green											
Bob Hansen											
Steve Hayes											
Marc Iavaroni											
Karl Malone											
Fred Roberts											
Carey Scurry											
John Stockton											

== Awards and records ==
=== Awards ===
- Mark Eaton, NBA All-Defensive First Team
- Karl Malone, NBA All-Rookie Team 1st Team

== Transactions ==
=== Free Agents ===
==== Additions ====
Player	Signed	Former team

==== Subtractions ====
Player	Left	New team

== See also ==
- 1985-86 NBA season
