= 1985–86 Denver Nuggets season =

NBA professional basketball team season

- Head coach: Doug Moe
- Arena: McNichols Sports Arena

Results
- Record: 47–35 (.573)
- Place: Division: 2nd (Midwest); Conference: 3rd (Western)
- Playoff finish: West Conference Semi-finals (lost to Rockets 2–4)
- Stats at Basketball Reference

Local media
- Television: KWGN-TV
- Radio: KOA

The 1985–86 Denver Nuggets season was the Nuggets' 10th season in the NBA and 19th season as a franchise.

In the playoffs, the Nuggets defeated the Portland Trail Blazers in four games in the First Round before losing to the eventual Western Conference Champion Houston Rockets in six games in the Semi-finals.

== Draft picks ==
| Round | Pick | Player | Position | Nationality | School/Club team |
|---|---|---|---|---|---|
| 1 | 15 | Blair Rasmussen | C | United States | Oregon |
| 2 | 43 | Barry Stevens | SG | United States | Iowa State |
| 4 | 89 | Pete Williams | F | United States | Arizona |
| 5 | 112 | Kenny Brown | | United States | Texas A&M |
| 6 | 135 | Joe Carrabino | | United States | Harvard |
| 7 | 158 | Eddie Smith | | United States | Arizona |

== Roster ==
1985-86 Denver Nuggets roster
Players

| Pos. | No. | Player | Height | Weight | DOB | From |
|---|---|---|---|---|---|---|
| C | 42 | Wayne Cooper | 6 ft 10 in (2.08 m) | 195 lb (88 kg) | | New Orleans |
| SG | 23 | T.R. Dunn | 6 ft 4 in (1.93 m) | 192 lb (87 kg) | | Alabama |
| SF | 2 | Alex English | 6 ft 7 in (2.01 m) | 190 lb (86 kg) | | South Carolina |
| G | 5 | Mike Evans | 6 ft 1 in (1.85 m) | 170 lb (77 kg) | | Kansas State |
| PF | 24 | Bill Hanzlik | 6 ft 7 in (2.01 m) | 185 lb (84 kg) | | Notre Dame |
| G | 12 | Fat Lever | 6 ft 3 in (1.91 m) | 170 lb (77 kg) | | Arizona State |
| PF | 33 | Calvin Natt | 6 ft 6 in (1.98 m) | 220 lb (100 kg) | | Louisiana–Monroe |
| C | 41 | Blair Rasmussen | 7 ft 0 in (2.13 m) | 250 lb (113 kg) | | Oregon |
| C | 34 | Danny Schayes | 6 ft 11 in (2.11 m) | 235 lb (107 kg) | | Syracuse |
| SF | 20 | Elston Turner | 6 ft 5 in (1.96 m) | 190 lb (86 kg) | | Mississippi |
| SG | 10 | Willie White | 6 ft 3 in (1.91 m) | 195 lb (88 kg) | | Chattanooga |
| PF | 31 | Pete Williams | 6 ft 7 in (2.01 m) | 190 lb (86 kg) | | Arizona |

Coaches
Head coach
- (United States) Doug Moe

Legend
- (DP) Unsigned draft pick
- (FA) Free agent
- (S) Suspended
- Injured

== Regular season ==
=== Season standings ===
| Midwest Division | W | L | PCT | GB | Home | Road | Div |
|---|---|---|---|---|---|---|---|
| y-Houston Rockets | 51 | 31 | .622 | – | 36–5 | 15–26 | 20–10 |
| x-Denver Nuggets | 47 | 35 | .573 | 4 | 34–7 | 13–28 | 15–15 |
| x-Dallas Mavericks | 44 | 38 | .537 | 7 | 26–15 | 18–23 | 16–14 |
| x-Utah Jazz | 42 | 40 | .512 | 9 | 27–14 | 15–26 | 15–15 |
| x-Sacramento Kings | 37 | 45 | .451 | 14 | 25–16 | 12–29 | 15–15 |
| x-San Antonio Spurs | 35 | 47 | .427 | 16 | 21–20 | 14–27 | 9–21 |

| # | Western Conference | | | | |
| # | Team | W | L | PCT | GB |
|---|---|---|---|---|---|
| 1 | c-Los Angeles Lakers | 62 | 20 | .756 | – |
| 2 | y-Houston Rockets | 51 | 31 | .622 | 11 |
| 3 | x-Denver Nuggets | 47 | 35 | .573 | 15 |
| 4 | x-Dallas Mavericks | 44 | 38 | .537 | 18 |
| 5 | x-Utah Jazz | 42 | 40 | .512 | 20 |
| 6 | x-Portland Trail Blazers | 40 | 42 | .488 | 22 |
| 7 | x-Sacramento Kings | 37 | 45 | .451 | 25 |
| 8 | x-San Antonio Spurs | 35 | 47 | .427 | 27 |
| 9 | Phoenix Suns | 32 | 50 | .390 | 30 |
| 10 | Los Angeles Clippers | 32 | 50 | .390 | 30 |
| 11 | Seattle SuperSonics | 31 | 51 | .378 | 31 |
| 12 | Golden State Warriors | 30 | 52 | .366 | 32 |

z – clinched division title
y – clinched division title
x – clinched playoff spot

== Game log ==
=== Regular season ===
1985–86 game log
Total: 47–35 (home: 34–7; road: 13–28)
October: 4–0 (home: 2–0; road: 2–0)

| Game | Date | Team | Score | High points | High rebounds | High assists | Location Attendance | Record |
|---|---|---|---|---|---|---|---|---|
| 1 | October 25, 1985 | @ Golden State | W 122–114 | | | | Oakland–Alameda County Coliseum Arena | 1–0 |
| 2 | October 26, 1985 | Sacramento | W 123–112 | | | | McNichols Sports Arena | 2–0 |
| 3 | October 29, 1985 | @ Phoenix | W 142–127 | | | | Arizona Veterans Memorial Coliseum | 3–0 |
| 4 | October 31, 1985 | Seattle | W 90–73 | | | | McNichols Sports Arena | 4–0 |

November: 8–6 (home: 7–2; road: 1–4)

| Game | Date | Team | Score | High points | High rebounds | High assists | Location Attendance | Record |
|---|---|---|---|---|---|---|---|---|
| 5 | November 5, 1985; 7:30 p.m. MST | Atlanta | W 128–113 | English (33) | Schayes (8) | English, Hanzlik, Lever (6) | McNichols Sports Arena; 8,691 | 5–0 |
| 6 | November 7, 1985 | Dallas | W 131–99 | | | | McNichols Sports Arena | 6–0 |
| 7 | November 8, 1985 | @ L.A. Lakers | L 99–128 | | | | The Forum | 6–1 |
| 8 | November 12, 1985 | @ Houston | L 119–127 | | | | The Summit | 6–2 |
| 9 | November 14, 1985 | San Antonio | W 112–109 | | | | McNichols Sports Arena | 7–2 |
| 10 | November 16, 1985 | L.A. Clippers | W 113–109 | | | | McNichols Sports Arena | 8–2 |
| 11 | November 19, 1985 | Houston | W 127–113 | | | | McNichols Sports Arena | 9–2 |
| 12 | November 21, 1985 | L.A. Lakers | W 121–120 | | | | McNichols Sports Arena | 10–2 |
| 13 | November 23, 1985 | Sacramento | W 122–118 | | | | McNichols Sports Arena | 11–2 |
| 14 | November 24, 1985 | @ Seattle | L 84–110 | | | | Seattle Center Coliseum | 11–3 |
| 15 | November 26, 1985 | Chicago | L 123–128 | | | | McNichols Sports Arena | 11–4 |
| 16 | November 27, 1985 | @ Golden State | L 102–104 | | | | Oakland-Alameda County Coliseum Arena | 11–5 |
| 17 | November 29, 1985 | @ Utah | W 129–114 | | | | Salt Palace Acord Arena | 12–5 |
| 18 | November 30, 1985 | Seattle | L 123–131 (2OT) | | | | McNichols Sports Arena | 12–6 |

December: 7–6 (home: 5–1; road: 2–5)

| Game | Date | Team | Score | High points | High rebounds | High assists | Location Attendance | Record |
|---|---|---|---|---|---|---|---|---|
| 19 | December 3, 1985 | @ New York | L 94–111 | | | | Madison Square Garden | 12–7 |
| 20 | December 4, 1985 | @ Indiana | W 119–105 | | | | Market Square Arena | 13–7 |
| 21 | December 6, 1985 | @ Philadelphia | W 123–121 | | | | The Spectrum | 14–7 |
| 22 | December 7, 1985 | @ Cleveland | L 114–124 | | | | Richfield Coliseum | 14–8 |
| 23 | December 11, 1985 | L.A. Clippers | W 134–95 | | | | McNichols Sports Arena | 15–8 |
| 24 | December 13, 1985 | L.A. Lakers | W 124–120 | | | | McNichols Sports Arena | 16–8 |
| 25 | December 14, 1985 | @ Dallas | L 100–127 | | | | Reunion Arena | 16–9 |
| 26 | December 17, 1985 | Golden State | W 122–114 | | | | McNichols Sports Arena | 17–9 |
| 27 | December 19, 1985 | Portland | W 123–118 | | | | McNichols Sports Arena | 18–9 |
| 28 | December 21, 1985 | San Antonio | L 118–128 | | | | McNichols Sports Arena | 18–10 |
| 29 | December 22, 1985 | @ Portland | L 114–121 | | | | Memorial Coliseum | 18–11 |
| 30 | December 28, 1985 | @ San Antonio | L 112–116 | | | | HemisFair Arena | 18–12 |
| 31 | December 30, 1985 | Houston | W 125–122 | | | | McNichols Sports Arena | 19–12 |

January: 8–8 (home: 6–1; road: 2–7)

| Game | Date | Team | Score | High points | High rebounds | High assists | Location Attendance | Record |
|---|---|---|---|---|---|---|---|---|
| 32 | January 3, 1986 | @ Seattle | L 107–117 | | | | Seattle Center Coliseum | 19–13 |
| 33 | January 4, 1986 | @ Sacramento | L 107–112 | | | | ARCO Arena | 19–14 |
| 34 | January 7, 1986 | Dallas | W 132–110 | | | | McNichols Sports Arena | 20–14 |
| 35 | January 9, 1986 | Seattle | W 94–90 | | | | McNichols Sports Arena | 21–14 |
| 36 | January 11, 1986 | Utah | W 114–106 | | | | McNichols Sports Arena | 22–14 |
| 37 | January 13, 1986 | @ Milwaukee | W 119–115 | | | | MECCA Arena | 23–14 |
| 38 | January 15, 1986 | @ Boston | L 100–123 | | | | Boston Garden | 23–15 |
| 39 | January 17, 1986 | @ Detroit | L 113–129 | | | | Pontiac Silverdome | 23–16 |
| 40 | January 18, 1986 | @ New Jersey | L 113–124 | | | | Brendan Byrne Arena | 23–17 |
| 41 | January 21, 1986 | @ Utah | L 114–117 (OT) | | | | Salt Palace Acord Arena | 23–18 |
| 42 | January 22, 1986 | New Jersey | W 137–124 | | | | McNichols Sports Arena | 23–19 |
| 43 | January 24, 1986 | San Antonio | L 98–113 | | | | McNichols Sports Arena | 24–19 |
| 44 | January 25, 1986 | @ L.A. Lakers | W 127–115 | | | | The Forum | 25–19 |
| 45 | January 27, 1986 | Cleveland | W 124–103 | | | | McNichols Sports Arena | 26–19 |
| 46 | January 28, 1986 | @ Sacramento | L 120–125 | | | | ARCO Arena | 26–20 |
| 47 | January 30, 1986 | New York | W 102–97 | | | | McNichols Sports Arena | 27–20 |

February: 9–4 (home: 7–0; road: 2–4)

| Game | Date | Team | Score | High points | High rebounds | High assists | Location Attendance | Record |
|---|---|---|---|---|---|---|---|---|
| 48 | February 1, 1986 | Milwaukee | W 116–113 | | | | McNichols Sports Arena | 28–20 |
| 49 | February 3, 1986 | @ Houston | L 102–104 | | | | The Summit | 28–21 |
| 50 | February 4, 1986 | Portland | W 119–118 | | | | McNichols Sports Arena | 29–21 |
| 51 | February 6, 1986 | @ San Antonio | W 100–95 | | | | HemisFair Arena | 30–21 |
All-Star Break
| 52 | February 12, 1986 | @ Dallas | L 110–117 | | | | Reunion Arena | 30–22 |
| 53 | February 14, 1986 | @ Phoenix | L 95–112 | | | | Arizona Veterans Memorial Coliseum | 30–23 |
| 54 | February 15, 1986 | Golden State | W 113–100 | | | | McNichols Sports Arena | 31–23 |
| 55 | February 18, 1986 | Washington | W 101–90 | | | | McNichols Sports Arena | 32–23 |
| 56 | February 20, 1986 | Boston | W 102–100 | | | | McNichols Sports Arena | 33–23 |
| 57 | February 22, 1986 | Dallas | W 113–106 | | | | McNichols Sports Arena | 34–23 |
| 58 | February 24, 1986 | @ Portland | W 119–113 | | | | Memorial Coliseum | 35–23 |
| 59 | February 25, 1986 | Phoenix | W 112–99 | | | | McNichols Sports Arena | 36–23 |
| 60 | February 27, 1986 | @ Houston | L 111–117 | | | | The Summit | 36–24 |

March: 8–7 (home: 6–2; road: 2–5)

| Game | Date | Team | Score | High points | High rebounds | High assists | Location Attendance | Record |
|---|---|---|---|---|---|---|---|---|
| 61 | March 1, 1986 | Philadelphia | L 107–118 | | | | McNichols Sports Arena | 36–25 |
| 62 | March 4, 1986 | Houston | W 128–115 | | | | McNichols Sports Arena | 37–25 |
| 63 | March 7, 1986 | Indiana | W 134–117 | | | | McNichols Sports Arena | 38–25 |
| 64 | March 9, 1986 | @ L.A. Clippers | W 123–121 | | | | Los Angeles Memorial Sports Arena | 39–25 |
| 65 | March 11, 1986; 5:30 p.m. MST | @ Atlanta | L 116–128 | English (38) | English (9) | Evans (5) | The Omni; 8,905 | 39–26 |
| 66 | March 13, 1986 | @ Chicago | L 102–112 | | | | Chicago Stadium | 39–27 |
| 67 | March 14, 1986 | @ Washington | W 101–91 | | | | Capital Centre | 40–27 |
| 68 | March 16, 1986 | Sacramento | W 119–113 | | | | McNichols Sports Arena | 41–27 |
| 69 | March 18, 1986 | @ Sacramento | L 113–117 | | | | ARCO Arena | 41–28 |
| 70 | March 19, 1986 | Detroit | W 114–98 | | | | McNichols Sports Arena | 42–28 |
| 71 | March 21, 1986 | L.A. Clippers | W 115–104 | | | | McNichols Sports Arena | 43–28 |
| 72 | March 23, 1986 | @ Golden State | L 111–113 | | | | Oakland-Alameda County Coliseum Arena | 43–29 |
| 73 | March 25, 1986 | L.A. Lakers | L 115–121 | | | | McNichols Sports Arena | 43–30 |
| 74 | March 26, 1986 | @ Utah | L 101–116 | | | | Salt Palace Acord Arena | 43–31 |
| 75 | March 28, 1986 | Utah | W 128–120 | | | | McNichols Sports Arena | 44–31 |

April: 3–4 (home: 1–1; road: 2–3)

| Game | Date | Team | Score | High points | High rebounds | High assists | Location Attendance | Record |
|---|---|---|---|---|---|---|---|---|
| 76 | April 1, 1986 | @ Portland | L 110–127 | | | | Memorial Coliseum | 44–32 |
| 77 | April 3, 1986 | @ Dallas | L 114–115 | | | | Reunion Arena | 44–33 |
| 78 | April 6, 1986 | @ San Antonio | W 124–106 | | | | HemisFair Arena | 45–33 |
| 79 | April 7, 1986 | @ Phoenix | W 131–123 | | | | Arizona Veterans Memorial Coliseum | 46–33 |
| 80 | April 9, 1986 | @ L.A. Clippers | L 127–132 | | | | Los Angeles Memorial Sports Arena | 46–34 |
| 81 | April 10, 1986 | Phoenix | W 115–113 | | | | McNichols Sports Arena | 47–34 |
| 82 | April 12, 1986 | Utah | L 99–117 | | | | McNichols Sports Arena | 47–35 |

1985–86 schedule

=== Playoffs ===
1986 playoff game log
First round: 3–1 (home: 1–1; road: 2–0)

| Game | Date | Team | Score | High points | High rebounds | High assists | Location Attendance | Series |
|---|---|---|---|---|---|---|---|---|
| 1 | April 18, 1986 | Portland | W 133–126 | Calvin Natt (40) | Danny Schayes (11) | English, Lever (9) | McNichols Sports Arena; 13,209 | 1–0 |
| 2 | April 20, 1986 | Portland | L 106–108 | Alex English (24) | Blair Rasmussen (9) | Alex English (10) | McNichols Sports Arena; 11,724 | 1–1 |
| 3 | April 22, 1986 | @ Portland | W 115–104 | Blair Rasmussen (15) | Calvin Natt (11) | Fat Lever (5) | Memorial Coliseum; 12,666 | 2–1 |
| 4 | April 24, 1986 | @ Portland | W 116–112 | Fat Lever (30) | T. R. Dunn (11) | Alex English (8) | Memorial Coliseum; 12,666 | 3–1 |

Conference Semi-finals: 2–4 (home: 2–1; road: 0–3)

| Game | Date | Team | Score | High points | High rebounds | High assists | Location Attendance | Series |
|---|---|---|---|---|---|---|---|---|
| 1 | April 26, 1986 | @ Houston | L 119–126 | Alex English (34) | Schayes, Natt (7) | English, Lever (9) | The Summit; 15,448 | 0–1 |
| 2 | April 29, 1986 | @ Houston | L 101–119 | Blair Rasmussen (18) | Wayne Cooper (9) | Mike Evans (7) | The Summit; 16,016 | 0–2 |
| 3 | May 2, 1986 | Houston | W 116–115 | Alex English (33) | Danny Schayes (8) | Alex English (5) | McNichols Sports Arena; 17,022 | 1–2 |
| 4 | May 4, 1986 | Houston | W 114–111 (OT) | Alex English (28) | Wayne Cooper (9) | Turner, Hanzlik (5) | McNichols Sports Arena; 14,152 | 2–2 |
| 5 | May 6, 1986 | @ Houston | L 103–131 | Alex English (27) | Blair Rasmussen (12) | Fat Lever (4) | The Summit; 16,016 | 2–3 |
| 6 | May 8, 1986 | Houston | L 122–126 (2OT) | Alex English (42) | Danny Schayes (14) | Fat Lever (7) | McNichols Sports Arena; 17,022 | 2–4 |

1986 schedule

== Player statistics ==
Legend
| GP | Games played | GS | Games started | MPG | Minutes per game |
| FG% | Field-goal percentage | 3P% | 3-point field-goal percentage | FT% | Free-throw percentage |
| RPG | Rebounds per game | APG | Assists per game | SPG | Steals per game |
| BPG | Blocks per game | PPG | Points per game |

=== Season ===
| Player | GP | GS | MPG | FG% | 3FG% | FT% | RPG | APG | SPG | BPG | PPG |

=== Playoffs ===
| Player | GP | GS | MPG | FG% | 3FG% | FT% | RPG | APG | SPG | BPG | PPG |

== Awards and records ==
- Alex English, All-NBA Second Team
- Bill Hanzlik, NBA All-Defensive Second Team

== See also ==
- 1985–86 NBA season
