= 1985–86 Dallas Mavericks season =

NBA professional basketball team season

- Head coach: Dick Motta
- General manager: Norm Sonju
- Owner: Don Carter
- Arena: Reunion Arena

Results
- Record: 44–38 (.537)
- Place: Division: 3rd (Midwest); Conference: 4th (Western)
- Playoff finish: Conference semifinals (lost to Lakers 2–4)
- Stats at Basketball Reference

Local media
- Television: KTVT; Home Sports Entertainment
- Radio: WBAP

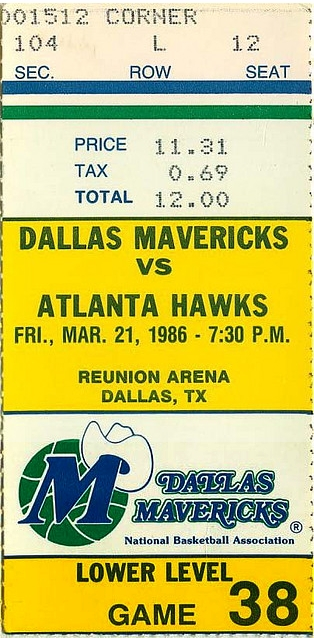
A ticket for a March 1986 game between the Dallas Mavericks and the Atlanta Hawks.

The 1985–86 Dallas Mavericks season was the Mavericks' 6th season in the NBA.

Dallas continued its strong play, finishing the season at 44–38, earning them the number 4 spot. They defeated the Utah Jazz in the opening round, but lost to the defending NBA champion Los Angeles Lakers, losing the series in six games.

== Draft picks ==
Round	Pick	Player	Position	Nationality	College
1	8	Detlef Schrempf	SF/PF	Germany	Washington
1	16	Bill Wennington	C	Canada	St. John's
1	17	Uwe Blab	C	Germany	Indiana
2	40	Mark Acres	PF/C	United States	Oral Roberts
3	50	Leonard Allen		United States	San Diego State
3	63	Harold Keeling	PG	United States	Santa Clara
4	86	Bubba Jennings		United States	Texas Tech
5	109	Tommy Davis		United States	Minnesota
6	132	Carlton Cooper		United States	Texas
7	155	Ed Catchings		United States	Nevada-Las Vegas

== Roster ==
1985–86 Dallas Mavericks roster
Players

Pos.	No.	Player	Height	Weight	DOB	From
SF	24	Mark Aguirre	6 ft 6 in (1.98 m)	232 lb (105 kg)	1959–12–10	DePaul
C	33	Uwe Blab	7 ft 1 in (2.16 m)	252 lb (114 kg)	1962–03–26	Indiana
SG	22	Rolando Blackman	6 ft 6 in (1.98 m)	190 lb (86 kg)	1959–02–26	Kansas State
PG	15	Brad Davis	6 ft 3 in (1.91 m)	180 lb (82 kg)	1955–12–17	Maryland
C	40	James Donaldson	7 ft 2 in (2.18 m)	275 lb (125 kg)	1957–08–16	Washington State
SF	14	Dale Ellis	6 ft 7 in (2.01 m)	205 lb (93 kg)	1960–08–06	Tennessee
PG	12	Derek Harper	6 ft 4 in (1.93 m)	185 lb (84 kg)	1961–10–13	Illinois
SG	43	Harold Keeling	6 ft 4 in (1.93 m)	185 lb (84 kg)	1963–09–18	Santa Clara
PF	44	Sam Perkins	6 ft 9 in (2.06 m)	239 lb (108 kg)	1961–06–14	North Carolina
SF	32	Detlef Schrempf	6 ft 9 in (2.06 m)	214 lb (97 kg)	1963–01–21	Washington
PF	31	Jay Vincent	6 ft 7 in (2.01 m)	220 lb (100 kg)	1959–06–10	Michigan State
C	23	Bill Wennington	7 ft 0 in (2.13 m)	245 lb (111 kg)	1963–12–26	St. John's

Coaches
Head coach
- Dick Motta
Assistant(s)
- Bob Weiss

Legend
- (DP) Unsigned draft pick
- (FA) Free agent
- (S) Suspended
- Injured

Roster
Updated: January 23, 1986

== Regular season ==
=== Season standings ===
Midwest Division	W	L	PCT	GB	Home	Road	Div
y-Houston Rockets	51	31	.622	–	36–5	15–26	20–10
x-Denver Nuggets	47	35	.573	4	34–7	13–28	15–15
x-Dallas Mavericks	44	38	.537	7	26–15	18–23	16–14
x-Utah Jazz	42	40	.512	9	27–14	15–26	15–15
x-Sacramento Kings	37	45	.451	14	25–16	12–29	15–15
x-San Antonio Spurs	35	47	.427	16	21–20	14–27	9–21

#	Western Conference				
#	Team	W	L	PCT	GB
1	c-Los Angeles Lakers	62	20	.756	–
2	y-Houston Rockets	51	31	.622	11
3	x-Denver Nuggets	47	35	.573	15
4	x-Dallas Mavericks	44	38	.537	18
5	x-Utah Jazz	42	40	.512	20
6	x-Portland Trail Blazers	40	42	.488	22
7	x-Sacramento Kings	37	45	.451	25
8	x-San Antonio Spurs	35	47	.427	27
9	Phoenix Suns	32	50	.390	30
10	Los Angeles Clippers	32	50	.390	30
11	Seattle SuperSonics	31	51	.378	31
12	Golden State Warriors	30	52	.366	32

z - clinched division title
y - clinched division title
x - clinched playoff spot

=== Game log ===
1985–86 game log
Total: 44–38 (home: 26–15; road: 18–23)
October: 1–1 (home: 1–1; road: 0–0)

Game	Date	Team	Score	High points	High rebounds	High assists	Location Attendance	Record
1	October 26, 1985	Seattle	W 101–95				Reunion Arena	1–0
2	October 29, 1985	L.A. Lakers	L 115–133				Reunion Arena	1–1

November: 8–6 (home: 7–2; road: 1–4)

Game	Date	Team	Score	High points	High rebounds	High assists	Location Attendance	Record
3	November 1, 1985	@ San Antonio	L 107–116				HemisFair Arena	1–2
4	November 2, 1985	Sacramento	W 119–113				Reunion Arena	2–2
5	November 5, 1985	Portland	L 109–111				Reunion Arena	2–3
6	November 7, 1985	@ Denver	L 99–131				McNichols Sports Arena	2–4
7	November 9, 1985	Houston	L 110–115				Reunion Arena	2–5
8	November 12, 1985	@ Seattle	L 90–109				Seattle Center Coliseum	2–6
9	November 13, 1985	@ Utah	W 115–100				Salt Palace Acord Arena	3–6
10	November 15, 1985	New Jersey	W 110–98				Reunion Arena	4–6
11	November 16, 1985	@ Houston	L 117–122				The Summit	4–7
12	November 19, 1985	Phoenix	W 123–119				Reunion Arena	5–7
13	November 23, 1985	Indiana	W 117–104				Reunion Arena	6–7
14	November 26, 1985; 7:30 p.m. CST	Washington	W 112–99	Harper (21)	Donaldson (11)	Aguirre (6)	Reunion Arena; 17,007	7–7
15	November 29, 1985	Sacramento	W 133–111				Reunion Arena	8–7
16	November 30, 1985	L.A. Clippers	W 124–115				Reunion Arena	9–7

December: 5–8 (home: 2–2; road: 3–6)

Game	Date	Team	Score	High points	High rebounds	High assists	Location Attendance	Record
17	December 3, 1985	@ Golden State	W 107–100				Oakland-Alameda County Coliseum Arena	10–7
18	December 5, 1985	San Antonio	L 116–120				Reunion Arena	10–8
19	December 7, 1985	Golden State	W 120–110				Reunion Arena	11–8
20	December 8, 1985	@ L.A. Lakers	L 119–125				The Forum	11–9
21	December 10, 1985	@ L.A. Clippers	L 118–120				Los Angeles Memorial Sports Arena	11–10
22	December 12, 1985	@ Houston	L 120–123				The Summit	11–11
23	December 14, 1985	Denver	W 127–100				Reunion Arena	12–11
24	December 18, 1985	@ Boston	L 117–137				Boston Garden	12–12
25	December 19, 1985; 6:30 p.m. CST	@ Atlanta	W 120–108	Blackman (31)	Perkins (14)	Davis (12)	The Omni; 5,867	13–12
26	December 21, 1985	@ Milwaukee	L 107–132				MECCA Arena	13–13
27	December 22, 1985	@ Cleveland	L 105–119				Richfield Coliseum	13–14
28	December 26, 1985	@ Phoenix	W 105–98				Arizona Veterans Memorial Coliseum	14–14
29	December 27, 1985	Portland	L 133–142 (OT)				Reunion Arena	14–15

January: 9–6 (home: 7–3; road: 2–3)

Game	Date	Team	Score	High points	High rebounds	High assists	Location Attendance	Record
30	January 4, 1986	Utah	W 119–106				Reunion Arena	15–15
31	January 7, 1986	@ Denver	L 110–132				McNichols Sports Arena	15–16
32	January 10, 1986	Phoenix	W 117–104				Reunion Arena	16–16
33	January 11, 1986	Golden State	W 127–123 (OT)				Reunion Arena	17–16
34	January 13, 1986	@ Seattle	W 90–89				Seattle Center Coliseum	18–16
35	January 15, 1986	New York	L 112–116				Reunion Arena	18–17
36	January 17, 1986	@ Utah	L 112–139				Salt Palace Acord Arena	18–18
37	January 19, 1986	Houston	W 131–96				Reunion Arena	19–18
38	January 21, 1986	@ Sacramento	L 110–119				ARCO Arena	19–19
39	January 22, 1986	L.A. Clippers	L 118–131				Reunion Arena	19–20
40	January 24, 1986	Detroit	L 120–129				Reunion Arena	19–21
41	January 25, 1986	@ San Antonio	W 123–107				HemisFair Arena	20–21
42	January 27, 1986	Chicago	W 124–116				Reunion Arena	21–21
43	January 29, 1986	San Antonio	W 126–114				Reunion Arena	22–21
44	January 31, 1986	Cleveland	W 107–91				Reunion Arena	23–21

February: 6–8 (home: 2–4; road: 4–4)

Game	Date	Team	Score	High points	High rebounds	High assists	Location Attendance	Record
45	February 2, 1986	Utah	W 100–97				Reunion Arena	24–21
46	February 4, 1986	@ L.A. Lakers	L 102–110				The Forum	24–22
47	February 6, 1986	@ Portland	W 115–111				Memorial Coliseum	25–22
All-Star Break
48	February 11, 1986	@ San Antonio	W 121–107				HemisFair Arena	26–22
49	February 12, 1986	Denver	W 117–110				Reunion Arena	27–22
50	February 14, 1986	@ Detroit	L 110–119				Pontiac Silverdome	27–23
51	February 16, 1986	@ Chicago	W 120–114				Chicago Stadium	28–23
52	February 17, 1986	@ New Jersey	W 126–124				Brendan Byrne Arena	29–23
53	February 19, 1986	Milwaukee	L 107–124				Reunion Arena	29–24
54	February 21, 1986	Houston	L 110–115				Reunion Arena	29–25
55	February 22, 1986	@ Denver	L 106–113				McNichols Sports Arena	29–26
56	February 24, 1986	@ Houston	L 105–110				The Summit	29–27
57	February 26, 1986	L.A. Lakers	L 116–119				Reunion Arena	29–28
58	February 28, 1986	Philadelphia	L 120–123				Reunion Arena	29–29

March: 11–5 (home: 5–2; road: 6–3)

Game	Date	Team	Score	High points	High rebounds	High assists	Location Attendance	Record
59	March 1, 1986	Golden State	W 119–110				Reunion Arena	30–29
60	March 3, 1986	@ Phoenix	W 139–138 (2OT)				Arizona Veterans Memorial Coliseum	31–29
61	March 6, 1986	@ L.A. Clippers	W 131–113				Los Angeles Memorial Sports Arena	32–29
62	March 7, 1986	@ Portland	L 114–125				Memorial Coliseum	32–30
63	March 9, 1986	@ Sacramento	W 117–102				ARCO Arena	33–30
64	March 10, 1986	Boston	W 116–115				Reunion Arena	34–30
65	March 12, 1986	Sacramento	L 120–127 (OT)				Reunion Arena	34–31
66	March 14, 1986	Portland	W 129–118				Reunion Arena	35–31
67	March 15, 1986	Utah	W 108–98				Reunion Arena	36–31
68	March 18, 1986	San Antonio	W 120–113				Reunion Arena	37–31
69	March 20, 1986	@ Utah	W 114–107				Salt Palace Acord Arena	38–31
70	March 21, 1986; 7:30 p.m. CST	Atlanta	L 103–107	Blackman (23)	Donaldson (14)	Davis, Harper (6)	Reunion Arena; 17,007	38–32
71	March 24, 1986	@ Indiana	W 126–120				Market Square Arena	39–32
72	March 26, 1986; 6:30 p.m. CST	@ Washington	L 112–120	Blackman (27)	Perkins (13)	Davis (6)	Capital Centre; 7,582	39–33
73	March 27, 1986	@ New York	W 110–105				Madison Square Garden	40–33
74	March 30, 1986	@ Philadelphia	L 113–114				The Spectrum	40–34

April: 4–4 (home: 2–1; road: 2–3)

Game	Date	Team	Score	High points	High rebounds	High assists	Location Attendance	Record
75	April 1, 1986	Phoenix	W 128–98				Reunion Arena	41–34
76	April 3, 1986	Denver	W 115–114				Reunion Arena	42–34
77	April 5, 1986	Seattle	L 109–111				Reunion Arena	42–35
78	April 7, 1986	@ Sacramento	L 115–122				ARCO Arena	42–36
79	April 8, 1986	@ Golden State	L 115–129				Oakland-Alameda County Coliseum Arena	42–37
80	April 10, 1986	@ Seattle	W 115–109				Seattle Center Coliseum	43–37
81	April 12, 1986	@ L.A. Clippers	L 108–115				Los Angeles Memorial Sports Arena	43–38
82	April 13, 1986	@ L.A. Lakers	W 127–104				The Forum	44–38

1985–86 schedule

== Playoffs ==
1986 playoff game log
First Round: 3–1 (home: 2–0; road: 1–1)

Game	Date	Team	Score	High points	High rebounds	High assists	Location Attendance	Series
1	April 18, 1986	Utah	W 101–93	Rolando Blackman (25)	Sam Perkins (15)	Derek Harper (7)	Reunion Arena; 17,007	1–0
2	April 20, 1986	Utah	W 113–106	Mark Aguirre (27)	Sam Perkins (10)	Aguirre, Harper (5)	Reunion Arena; 17,007	2–0
3	April 23, 1986	@ Utah	L 98–100	James Donaldson (17)	James Donaldson (20)	Derek Harper (6)	Salt Palace Acord Arena; 11,635	2–1
4	April 25, 1986	@ Utah	W 117–113	Sam Perkins (29)	Sam Perkins (12)	Mark Aguirre (8)	Salt Palace Acord Arena; 12,683	3–1

Conference semifinals: 2–4 (home: 2–1; road: 0–3)

Game	Date	Team	Score	High points	High rebounds	High assists	Location Attendance	Series
1	April 27, 1986	@ L.A. Lakers	L 116–130	Jay Vincent (18)	James Donaldson (10)	Derek Harper (9)	The Forum; 17,505	0–1
2	April 30, 1986	@ L.A. Lakers	L 113–117	Mark Aguirre (28)	Mark Aguirre (12)	Derek Harper (16)	The Forum; 17,505	0–2
3	May 2, 1986	L.A. Lakers	W 110–108	Mark Aguirre (27)	James Donaldson (14)	Mark Aguirre (8)	Reunion Arena; 17,007	1–2
4	May 4, 1986	L.A. Lakers	W 120–118	Mark Aguirre (39)	James Donaldson (11)	Derek Harper (11)	Reunion Arena; 17,007	2–2
5	May 6, 1986	@ L.A. Lakers	L 113–116	Mark Aguirre (27)	James Donaldson (8)	Derek Harper (9)	The Forum; 17,505	2–3
6	May 8, 1986	L.A. Lakers	L 107–120	Mark Aguirre (28)	James Donaldson (18)	Rolando Blackman (8)	Reunion Arena; 17,007	2–4

1986 schedule

== Player statistics ==
=== Ragular season ===
Player	POS	GP	GS	MP	REB	AST	STL	BLK	PTS	MPG	RPG	APG	SPG	BPG	PPG
Rolando Blackman	SG	82	81	2,787	291	271	79	25	1,762	34.0	3.5	3.3	1.0	.3	21.5
Brad Davis	PG	82	43	1,971	146	467	57	15	764	24.0	1.8	5.7	.7	.2	9.3
Sam Perkins	PF	80	79	2,626	685	153	75	94	1,234	32.8	8.6	1.9	.9	1.2	15.4
Jay Vincent	PF	80	3	1,994	368	180	66	21	1,106	24.9	4.6	2.3	.8	.3	13.8
Derek Harper	PG	79	39	2,150	226	416	153	23	963	27.2	2.9	5.3	1.9	.3	12.2
Mark Aguirre	SF	74	73	2,501	445	339	62	14	1,670	33.8	6.0	4.6	.8	.2	22.6
Dale Ellis	SF	72	1	1,086	168	37	40	9	508	15.1	2.3	.5	.6	.1	7.1
James Donaldson^{†}	C	69	64	2,241	664	84	23	110	573	32.5	9.6	1.2	.3	1.6	8.3
Detlef Schrempf	SF	64	12	969	198	88	23	10	397	15.1	3.1	1.4	.4	.2	6.2
Bill Wennington	C	56	3	562	132	21	11	22	189	10.0	2.4	.4	.2	.4	3.4
Uwe Blab	C	48	0	409	91	17	3	12	124	8.5	1.9	.4	.1	.3	2.6
Harold Keeling	SG	20	0	75	6	10	7	0	44	3.8	.3	.5	.4	.0	2.2
Kurt Nimphius^{†}	PF	13	4	280	60	14	3	12	91	21.5	4.6	1.1	.2	.9	7.0
Wallace Bryant^{†}	C	9	8	154	33	11	3	2	28	17.1	3.7	1.2	.3	.2	3.1

- ^{†} Denotes player spent time with another team in the season. Stats reflect time with the Mavericks only.

=== Playoffs ===
Player	POS	GP	GS	MP	REB	AST	STL	BLK	PTS	MPG	RPG	APG	SPG	BPG	PPG
James Donaldson	C	10	10	410	117	10	6	12	109	41.0	11.7	1.0	.6	1.2	10.9
Rolando Blackman	SG	10	10	371	35	32	8	1	208	37.1	3.5	3.2	.8	.1	20.8
Derek Harper	PG	10	10	348	19	76	23	0	134	34.8	1.9	7.6	2.3	.0	13.4
Sam Perkins	PF	10	10	347	83	24	9	14	149	34.7	8.3	2.4	.9	1.4	14.9
Mark Aguirre	SF	10	10	345	71	54	9	0	247	34.5	7.1	5.4	.9	.0	24.7
Jay Vincent	PF	10	0	204	39	15	4	1	106	20.4	3.9	1.5	.4	.1	10.6
Brad Davis	PG	10	0	163	19	23	3	0	77	16.3	1.9	2.3	.3	.0	7.7
Detlef Schrempf	SF	10	0	120	23	14	2	1	37	12.0	2.3	1.4	.2	.1	3.7
Dale Ellis	SF	7	0	67	7	2	2	2	30	9.6	1.0	.3	.3	.3	4.3
Bill Wennington	C	6	0	18	5	0	0	0	7	3.0	.8	.0	.0	.0	1.2
Uwe Blab	C	1	0	6	1	0	0	0	4	6.0	1.0	.0	.0	.0	4.0
Harold Keeling	SG	1	0	1	0	0	0	0	0	1.0	.0	.0	.0	.0	.0

== Awards and records ==
- Rolando Blackman, NBA All-Star Game

== See also ==
- 1985-86 NBA season
