= Uwe Blab =

German basketball player (born 1962)

Personal information
- Born: March 26, 1962 (age 64) Munich, West Germany
- Listed height: 7 ft 2 in (2.18 m)
- Listed weight: 252 lb (114 kg)

Career information
- High school: Effingham (Effingham, Illinois)
- College: Indiana (1981–1985)
- NBA draft: 1985: 1st round, 17th overall pick
- Drafted by: Dallas Mavericks
- Playing career: 1985–1993
- Position: Center
- Number: 33

Career history
- 1985–1989: Dallas Mavericks
- 1989–1990: Golden State Warriors
- 1990: San Antonio Spurs
- 1990: Basket Napoli
- 1991–1993: ALBA Berlin

Career highlights
- First-team All-Big Ten (1985); Fourth-team Parade All-American (1981)
- Stats at NBA.com
- Stats at Basketball Reference

Uwe Konstantin Blab (born March 26, 1962) is a German former professional basketball player who had a five-year career in the National Basketball Association (NBA). Due to his red hair, Blab was nicknamed “Burning Skyscraper”, especially after becoming, along with Detlef Schrempf, who was drafted the same year, the first German for many years to join the NBA in North America.

== High School and College ==
Blab attended Effingham High School in Illinois, which won second place in the Illinois High School Association (IHSA) State Basketball tournament in 1980. He played college basketball for the Indiana University Hoosiers, averaging 16 points per game in his senior season. He helped IU win the Big Ten championship in 1983 and then advance to the NCAA Tournament's "Elite Eight" the following season.

== National team career ==
Blab was first selected to the West Germany national team for the EuroBasket in 1983. He was also part of the team at the 1984 Summer Olympics, after graduating from Indiana University. A year later, he helped the team to a fifth-place finish at EuroBasket 1985. Seven years later, Blab was able to participate in the 1992 Summer Olympics, this time for a unified Germany.

== NBA ==
Drafted 17th overall by the Dallas Mavericks in the 1985 NBA draft, he never proved to be a significant contributor. His first four seasons were with the Mavericks, and he played for both the Golden State Warriors and the San Antonio Spurs in his final year. He finished with NBA career averages of 2.1 points and 1.8 rebounds per game at the center position. His career high was with the Dallas Mavericks when he scored 14 points in Dallas's road loss against Cleveland on December 22, 1985. Off the court Blab later admitted that he just kind of fell into the basketball world and never really considered it to be a great passion. His true loves were soccer and handball.

== European career ==
After his stint in the NBA, Blab went back overseas to play for Napoli Basket, then known as Jcoplastic Napoli. He played his best basketball in 1990 for Jcoplastic Napoli averaging 11.1 points and 7.1 rebounds. On October 21, 1990, Uwe Blab set his career high in points in an Italy - LBA Serie A game. That day he scored 31 points in Napoli's home win against Torino, 98–85. He also had 15 rebounds, 1 assist, 5 steals and 2 blocks. He shot 13/16 from two, shooting at 81.3% from the field. He also shot 5/5 from the free-throw line. He finished up his basketball career in his home country playing for ALBA Berlin during 1991–1993.

== Career statistics ==
Legend
| GP | Games played | GS | Games started | MPG | Minutes per game |
| FG% | Field goal percentage | 3P% | 3-point field goal percentage | FT% | Free throw percentage |
| RPG | Rebounds per game | APG | Assists per game | SPG | Steals per game |
| BPG | Blocks per game | PPG | Points per game | **Bold** | Career high |

=== NBA ===
==== Regular season ====
| Year | Team | GP | GS | MPG | FG% | 3P% | FT% | RPG | APG | SPG | BPG | PPG |
|---|---|---|---|---|---|---|---|---|---|---|---|---|
| 1985–86 | Dallas | 48 | 0 | 8.5 | .468 | – | .537 | 1.9 | .4 | **.1** | .3 | **2.6** |
| 1986–87 | Dallas | 30 | 0 | 5.3 | .392 | – | .464 | 1.2 | .4 | **.1** | .3 | 1.8 |
| 1987–88 | Dallas | **73** | 1 | 9.0 | .439 | – | .708 | 1.8 | .5 | **.1** | .4 | 2.2 |
| 1988–89 | Dallas | 37 | 0 | 5.6 | .462 | – | **.800** | 1.2 | .3 | **.1** | .4 | 1.8 |
| 1989–90 | Golden State | 40 | **33** | **12.0** | .379 | – | .548 | **2.5** | **.6** | .0 | **.6** | 2.1 |
| 1989–90 | San Antonio | 7 | 0 | 7.1 | **.545** | – | .500 | 1.3 | .1 | .0 | .0 | 2.1 |
| Career | | 235 | 34 | 8.4 | .433 | – | .608 | 1.8 | .4 | .1 | .4 | 2.1 |

==== Playoffs ====
| Year | Team | GP | GS | MPG | FG% | 3P% | FT% | RPG | APG | SPG | BPG | PPG |
|---|---|---|---|---|---|---|---|---|---|---|---|---|
| 1986 | Dallas | 1 | 0 | 6.0 | .667 | – | – | 1.0 | .0 | .0 | .0 | **4.0** |
| 1987 | Dallas | 1 | 0 | **10.0** | **1.000** | – | .250 | **3.0** | .0 | **1.0** | **1.0** | 3.0 |
| 1988 | Dallas | **3** | 0 | 2.7 | .000 | – | **1.000** | .3 | **.3** | .0 | .0 | .7 |
| 1990 | San Antonio | 2 | 0 | 2.5 | .000 | – | .500 | 1.0 | .0 | .0 | .0 | 1.5 |
| Career | | 7 | 0 | 4.1 | .429 | – | .500 | 1.0 | .1 | .1 | .1 | 1.7 |

== Personal life ==
After his active career, Blab moved back to Texas with his family and became a software engineer. One of his sons, Christopher, died in January 2010 resulting from a brawl at a college in San Marcos, Texas, aged 19.
