= 1985–86 Sacramento Kings season =

NBA professional basketball team season

- Head coach: Phil Johnson
- Owners: Joseph Benvenuti; Gregg Lukenbill
- Arena: ARCO Arena I

Results
- Record: 37–45 (.451)
- Place: Division: 5th (Midwest); Conference: 7th (Western)
- Playoff finish: West First Round (eliminated 0–3)
- Stats at Basketball Reference

Local media
- Television: KOVR
- Radio: KFBK

The 1985–86 Sacramento Kings season was the Kings' 37th season in the NBA and first in Sacramento following its relocation from Kansas City. The Kings played their home games at the original ARCO Arena, and finished the season with a record of 37 wins and 45 losses, placing them fifth in the Midwest Division and seventh in the Western Conference. They made the playoffs, but were quickly eliminated in the first round in three straight games by the eventual Western Conference champion Houston Rockets.

On April 16, 1985, the NBA board of governors voted 22–0 for the Kings to be relocated to Sacramento. They moved into the first ARCO Arena, their temporary home for three seasons.

The team performed preseason workouts at Yuba College.

Sacramento did not start the season well, having a 9–22 record on December 31, the worst in the Western Conference.

== Draft picks ==
Round	Pick	Player	Position	Nationality	College
1	6	Joe Kleine	C	United States	Arkansas
3	51	Charlie Bradley	SF	United States	South Florida
3	66	Michael Adams	PG	United States	Boston College
4	76	Willie Simmons		United States	Louisiana Tech
5	98	Bob Lojewski		United States	St. Joseph's
6	120	Charles Valentine		United States	Arkansas
7	145	Alton Lee Gipson		United States	Florida State

== Roster ==
1985–86 Sacramento Kings roster
Players

Pos.	No.	Player	Height	Weight	DOB	From
G	10	Mike Bratz	6 ft 2 in (1.88 m)	185 lb (84 kg)	1955–10–17	Stanford
PG	22	Larry Drew	6 ft 1 in (1.85 m)	170 lb (77 kg)	1958–04–02	Missouri
F	8	Eddie Johnson	6 ft 7 in (2.01 m)	215 lb (98 kg)	1959–05–01	Illinois
C	50	Rich Kelley	7 ft 0 in (2.13 m)	235 lb (107 kg)	1953–03–23	Stanford
C	35	Joe Kleine	6 ft 11 in (2.11 m)	255 lb (116 kg)	1962–01–04	Arkansas
PF	53	Mark Olberding	6 ft 8 in (2.03 m)	225 lb (102 kg)	1956–04–21	Minnesota
G	24	Reggie Theus	6 ft 7 in (2.01 m)	190 lb (86 kg)	1957–10–13	UNLV
PF/C	41	LaSalle Thompson	6 ft 10 in (2.08 m)	245 lb (111 kg)	1961–06–23	Texas
PF	33	Otis Thorpe	6 ft 9 in (2.06 m)	225 lb (102 kg)	1962–08–05	Providence
G/F	40	Terry Tyler	6 ft 7 in (2.01 m)	215 lb (98 kg)	1956–10–30	Detroit Mercy
SG	42	Mike Woodson	6 ft 5 in (1.96 m)	195 lb (88 kg)	1958–03–24	Indiana

Coaches
Head coach
- Phil Johnson
Assistant(s)
- Frank Hamblen

Legend
- (DP) Unsigned draft pick
- (FA) Free agent
- (S) Suspended
- Injured

== Regular season ==
=== Season standings ===
Midwest Division	W	L	PCT	GB	Home	Road	Div
y-Houston Rockets	51	31	.622	–	36–5	15–26	20–10
x-Denver Nuggets	47	35	.573	4	34–7	13–28	15–15
x-Dallas Mavericks	44	38	.537	7	26–15	18–23	16–14
x-Utah Jazz	42	40	.512	9	27–14	15–26	15–15
x-Sacramento Kings	37	45	.451	14	25–16	12–29	15–15
x-San Antonio Spurs	35	47	.427	16	21–20	14–27	9–21

#	Western Conference				
#	Team	W	L	PCT	GB
1	c-Los Angeles Lakers	62	20	.756	–
2	y-Houston Rockets	51	31	.622	11
3	x-Denver Nuggets	47	35	.573	15
4	x-Dallas Mavericks	44	38	.537	18
5	x-Utah Jazz	42	40	.512	20
6	x-Portland Trail Blazers	40	42	.488	22
7	x-Sacramento Kings	37	45	.451	25
8	x-San Antonio Spurs	35	47	.427	27
9	Phoenix Suns	32	50	.390	30
10	Los Angeles Clippers	32	50	.390	30
11	Seattle SuperSonics	31	51	.378	31
12	Golden State Warriors	30	52	.366	32

z – clinched division title
y – clinched division title
x – clinched playoff spot

== Playoffs ==
1986 playoff game log
First round: 0–3 (home: 0–1; road: 0–2)

Game	Date	Team	Score	High points	High rebounds	High assists	Location Attendance	Series
1	April 17	@ Houston	L 87–107	Reggie Theus (18)	LaSalle Thompson (17)	Reggie Theus (4)	The Summit; 15,101	0–1
2	April 19	@ Houston	L 103–111	Reggie Theus (19)	LaSalle Thompson (10)	Reggie Theus (7)	The Summit; 16,016	0–2
3	April 22	Houston	L 98–113	Eddie Johnson (33)	three players tied (8)	Reggie Theus (8)	ARCO Arena I 10,333	0–3

1986 schedule

== See also ==
- 1985–86 NBA season
