= 1985–86 San Antonio Spurs season =

- Head coach: Cotton Fitzsimmons
- General manager: Bob Bass
- Owner: Angelo Drossos
- Arena: HemisFair Arena

Results
- Record: 35–47 (.427)
- Place: Division: 6th (Midwest); Conference: 8th (Western)
- Playoff finish: First round (lost to Lakers 0–3)
- Stats at Basketball Reference

Local media
- Television: KMOL-TV; Home Sports Entertainment
- Radio: WOAI

The 1985–86 San Antonio Spurs season was the Spurs' tenth season in the NBA, the 13th in San Antonio, and the 19th season as a franchise. It was also their first season without George Gervin, who played with the team since 1974 as he was traded to the Chicago Bulls during the offseason.

In his second year, Alvin Robertson led the league in steals and made his first All-Star Game appearance. Robertson earned Defensive Player of the year honors at the end of the season.

== Draft picks ==
Round	Pick	Player	Position	Nationality	College
1	14	Alfredrick Hughes	SF/SG	United States	Loyola (IL)
2	29	Mike Brittain	C	United States	South Carolina
2	35	Tyrone Corbin	SF	United States	DePaul
4	82	Scott Roth	PF	United States	Wisconsin
5	106	Clayton Olivier		United States	Southern California
6	128	Chris Harper		United States	Oregon
7	152	Al Young		United States	Virginia Polytech

== Roster ==
San Antonio Spurs roster
Players

Pos.	No.	Player	Height	Weight	DOB	From
C	40	Mike Brittain	7 ft 0 in (2.13 m)	235 lb (107 kg)		South Carolina
G/F	23	Tyrone Corbin	6 ft 6 in (1.98 m)	210 lb (95 kg)		DePaul
C	53	Artis Gilmore	7 ft 2 in (2.18 m)	240 lb (109 kg)		Jacksonville
F	10	Dave Greenwood	6 ft 9 in (2.06 m)	222 lb (101 kg)		UCLA
G	6	Alfredrick Hughes	6 ft 5 in (1.96 m)	215 lb (98 kg)		Loyola Chicago
F/C	33	Steve Johnson	6 ft 10 in (2.08 m)	235 lb (107 kg)		Oregon State
F	3	Jeff Lamp	6 ft 6 in (1.98 m)	195 lb (88 kg)		Virginia
G	1	Wes Matthews	6 ft 1 in (1.85 m)	170 lb (77 kg)		Wisconsin
F	34	Mike Mitchell	6 ft 7 in (2.01 m)	215 lb (98 kg)		Auburn
G	00	Johnny Moore	6 ft 1 in (1.85 m)	175 lb (79 kg)		Texas
G	21	Alvin Robertson	6 ft 3 in (1.91 m)	185 lb (84 kg)		Arkansas
G	20	Jon Sundvold	6 ft 2 in (1.88 m)	170 lb (77 kg)		Missouri
C	45	Jeff Wilkins	6 ft 11 in (2.11 m)	230 lb (104 kg)		Illinois State

Coaches
Head coach
- Cotton Fitzsimmons (Midwestern State)
Assistant(s)
- Bob Bass (Oklahoma Baptist)

Legend
- (DP) Unsigned draft pick
- (FA) Free agent
- (S) Suspended
- Injured

== Regular season ==
=== Season standings ===
Midwest Division	W	L	PCT	GB	Home	Road	Div
y-Houston Rockets	51	31	.622	–	36–5	15–26	20–10
x-Denver Nuggets	47	35	.573	4	34–7	13–28	15–15
x-Dallas Mavericks	44	38	.537	7	26–15	18–23	16–14
x-Utah Jazz	42	40	.512	9	27–14	15–26	15–15
x-Sacramento Kings	37	45	.451	14	25–16	12–29	15–15
x-San Antonio Spurs	35	47	.427	16	21–20	14–27	9–21

#	Western Conference				
#	Team	W	L	PCT	GB
1	c-Los Angeles Lakers	62	20	.756	–
2	y-Houston Rockets	51	31	.622	11
3	x-Denver Nuggets	47	35	.573	15
4	x-Dallas Mavericks	44	38	.537	18
5	x-Utah Jazz	42	40	.512	20
6	x-Portland Trail Blazers	40	42	.488	22
7	x-Sacramento Kings	37	45	.451	25
8	x-San Antonio Spurs	35	47	.427	27
9	Phoenix Suns	32	50	.390	30
10	Los Angeles Clippers	32	50	.390	30
11	Seattle SuperSonics	31	51	.378	31
12	Golden State Warriors	30	52	.366	32

z - clinched division title
y - clinched division title
x - clinched playoff spot

== Game log ==
=== Regular season ===
1985–86 game log
Total: 35–47 (home: 21–20; road: 14–27)
October: 1–2 (home: 1–1; road: 0–1)

Game	Date	Team	Score	High points	High rebounds	High assists	Location Attendance	Record

November: 8–6 (home: 6–1; road: 2–5)

Game	Date	Team	Score	High points	High rebounds	High assists	Location Attendance	Record

December: 10–5 (home: 4–1; road: 6–4)

Game	Date	Team	Score	High points	High rebounds	High assists	Location Attendance	Record

January: 6–10 (home: 3–6; road: 3–4)

Game	Date	Team	Score	High points	High rebounds	High assists	Location Attendance	Record

February: 5–8 (home: 4–4; road: 1–4)

Game	Date	Team	Score	High points	High rebounds	High assists	Location Attendance	Record

March: 3–13 (home: 2–4; road: 1–9)

Game	Date	Team	Score	High points	High rebounds	High assists	Location Attendance	Record

April: 2–3 (home: 1–3; road: 1–0)

Game	Date	Team	Score	High points	High rebounds	High assists	Location Attendance	Record

1985–86 schedule

== Playoffs ==
1986 playoff game log
First Round: 0–3 (home: 0–1; road: 0–2)

Game	Date	Team	Score	High points	High rebounds	High assists	Location Attendance	Series
1	April 17	@ L.A. Lakers	L 88–135	Mike Mitchell (24)	Mitchell, Johnson (4)	Wes Matthews (10)	The Forum; 17,505	0–1
2	April 19	@ L.A. Lakers	L 94–122	Wes Matthews (30)	David Greenwood (7)	Alvin Robertson (8)	The Forum; 17,505	0–2
3	April 23	L.A. Lakers	L 94–114	Wes Matthews (30)	Artis Gilmore (11)	Wes Matthews (8)	HemisFair Arena; 7,918	0–3

1986 schedule

== Player statistics ==
=== Regular season ===
Player	POS	GP	GS	MP	REB	AST	STL	BLK	PTS	MPG	RPG	APG	SPG	BPG	PPG
Mike Mitchell	SF	82	82	2,970	409	188	56	25	1,921	36.2	5.0	2.3	.7	.3	23.4
Alvin Robertson	SG	82	82	2,878	516	448	301	40	1,392	35.1	6.3	5.5	3.7	.5	17.0
Wes Matthews	PG	75	46	1,853	131	476	87	32	817	24.7	1.7	6.3	1.2	.4	10.9
Artis Gilmore	C	71	71	2,395	600	102	39	108	1,184	33.7	8.5	1.4	.5	1.5	16.7
Steve Johnson	C	71	55	1,828	462	95	44	66	983	25.7	6.5	1.3	.6	.9	13.8
Jon Sundvold	PG	70	4	1,150	80	261	34	0	500	16.4	1.1	3.7	.5	.0	7.1
David Greenwood	PF	68	24	1,910	531	90	37	52	538	28.1	7.8	1.3	.5	.8	7.9
Alfredrick Hughes	SG	68	0	866	113	61	26	5	356	12.7	1.7	.9	.4	.1	5.2
Marc Iavaroni^{†}	PF	42	7	669	132	53	22	14	191	15.9	3.1	1.3	.5	.3	4.5
Jeff Cook^{†}	PF	34	0	356	81	21	13	11	82	10.5	2.4	.6	.4	.3	2.4
Mike Brittain	C	32	2	219	49	5	3	12	54	6.8	1.5	.2	.1	.4	1.7
Jeff Lamp^{†}	SF	30	1	620	79	53	19	1	332	20.7	2.6	1.8	.6	.0	11.1
Johnny Moore	PG	28	23	856	86	252	70	6	363	30.6	3.1	9.0	2.5	.2	13.0
Jeff Wilkins^{†}	C	27	4	522	127	18	8	10	130	19.3	4.7	.7	.3	.4	4.8
Ray Williams^{†}	PG	23	8	397	37	111	28	3	164	17.3	1.6	4.8	1.2	.1	7.1
Tyrone Corbin	SF	16	0	174	25	11	11	2	64	10.9	1.6	.7	.7	.1	4.0
Rod Higgins^{†}	SF	11	0	128	24	12	2	3	47	11.6	2.2	1.1	.2	.3	4.3
Ennis Whatley^{†}	PG	2	1	14	0	3	0	0	2	7.0	.0	1.5	.0	.0	1.0

- ^{†} Denotes player spent time with another team in the season. Stats reflect time with the Spurs only.

=== Playoffs ===
Player	POS	GP	GS	MP	REB	AST	STL	BLK	PTS	MPG	RPG	APG	SPG	BPG	PPG
Wes Matthews	PG	3	3	116	7	24	6	0	76	38.7	2.3	8.0	2.0	.0	25.3
Mike Mitchell	SF	3	3	107	9	10	3	3	47	35.7	3.0	3.3	1.0	1.0	15.7
Artis Gilmore	C	3	3	107	18	3	7	1	40	35.7	6.0	1.0	2.3	.3	13.3
David Greenwood	PF	3	3	101	18	3	3	1	30	33.7	6.0	1.0	1.0	.3	10.0
Alvin Robertson	SG	3	3	98	14	19	7	1	27	32.7	4.7	6.3	2.3	.3	9.0
Steve Johnson	C	3	0	53	6	2	0	1	15	17.7	2.0	.7	.0	.3	5.0
Jeff Lamp	SF	3	0	45	1	7	1	0	15	15.0	.3	2.3	.3	.0	5.0
Jon Sundvold	PG	3	0	43	1	5	0	0	16	14.3	.3	1.7	.0	.0	5.3
Alfredrick Hughes	SG	3	0	18	0	1	1	0	8	6.0	.0	.3	.3	.0	2.7
Jeff Wilkins	C	3	0	16	3	0	0	2	0	5.3	1.0	.0	.0	.7	.0
Tyrone Corbin	SF	1	0	14	1	1	0	0	0	14.0	1.0	1.0	.0	.0	.0
Mike Brittain	C	1	0	2	1	0	0	1	2	2.0	1.0	.0	.0	1.0	2.0

== Awards and records ==
- Alvin Robertson, NBA Most Improved Player Award
- Alvin Robertson, All-NBA Second Team
- Alvin Robertson, NBA All-Defensive Second Team

== See also ==
- 1985-86 NBA season
