= 1985–86 Golden State Warriors season =

NBA professional basketball team season

- Head coach: Johnny Bach
- Arena: Oakland-Alameda County Coliseum Arena

Results
- Record: 30–52 (.366)
- Place: Division: 6th (Pacific); Conference: 12th (Western)
- Playoff finish: Did not qualify
- Stats at Basketball Reference

Local media
- Television: KBHK-TV
- Radio: KNBR

The 1985–86 Golden State Warriors season was the Warriors' 40th season in the NBA and 23rd in the San Francisco Bay Area.

== Draft picks ==
Round	Pick	Player	Position	Nationality	College
1	7	Chris Mullin	SG/SF	United States	St. John's
2	42	Bobby Lee Hurt		United States	Alabama
3	49	Brad Wright		United States	UCLA
4	71	Luster Goodwin		United States	Texas-El Paso
5	95	Greg Cavener		United States	Missouri
6	117	Gerald Crosby		United States	Georgia
7	141	Eric Boyd		United States	North Carolina A&T

== Roster ==
Golden State Warriors roster
Players

Pos.	No.	Player	Height	Weight	DOB	From
F	4	Greg Ballard	6 ft 7 in (2.01 m)	215 lb (98 kg)		Oregon
C	2	Joe Barry Carroll	7 ft 0 in (2.13 m)	225 lb (102 kg)		Purdue
G	32	Lester Conner	6 ft 4 in (1.93 m)	180 lb (82 kg)		Oregon State
G	21	Sleepy Floyd	6 ft 3 in (1.91 m)	170 lb (77 kg)		Georgetown
G	15	Geoff Huston	6 ft 2 in (1.88 m)	175 lb (79 kg)		Texas Tech
G/F	17	Chris Mullin	6 ft 6 in (1.98 m)	200 lb (91 kg)		St. John's
G/F	45	Purvis Short	6 ft 7 in (2.01 m)	210 lb (95 kg)		Jackson State
F	13	Larry Smith	6 ft 8 in (2.03 m)	215 lb (98 kg)		Alcorn State
G/F	20	Terry Teagle	6 ft 5 in (1.96 m)	195 lb (88 kg)		Baylor
F	7	Peter Thibeaux	6 ft 7 in (2.01 m)	210 lb (95 kg)		Saint Mary's
F	50	Pete Verhoeven	6 ft 9 in (2.06 m)	215 lb (98 kg)		Fresno State
C	33	Jerome Whitehead	6 ft 10 in (2.08 m)	220 lb (100 kg)		Marquette

Coaches
Head coach
- Johnny Bach (Fordham)
Assistant(s)
- Bob Zuffelato (Central Connecticut State)

Legend
- (DP) Unsigned draft pick
- (FA) Free agent
- (S) Suspended
- Injured

== Regular season ==
- On Wednesday, January 15, 1986, the Warriors scored 150 points in a 150-104 regulation victory over the Utah Jazz. None of Golden State's starters played in the fourth quarter. Eight Golden State players scored in double figures.

=== Season standings ===
Pacific Division	W	L	PCT	GB	Home	Road	Div
y-Los Angeles Lakers	62	20	.756	–	35–6	27–14	23–7
x-Portland Trail Blazers	40	42	.488	22	27–14	13–28	18–12
Phoenix Suns	32	50	.390	30	23–18	9–32	16–14
Los Angeles Clippers	32	50	.390	30	22–19	10–31	10–20
Seattle SuperSonics	31	51	.378	31	24–17	7–34	11–19
Golden State Warriors	30	52	.366	32	24–17	6–35	12–18

#	Western Conference				
#	Team	W	L	PCT	GB
1	c-Los Angeles Lakers	62	20	.756	–
2	y-Houston Rockets	51	31	.622	11
3	x-Denver Nuggets	47	35	.573	15
4	x-Dallas Mavericks	44	38	.537	18
5	x-Utah Jazz	42	40	.512	20
6	x-Portland Trail Blazers	40	42	.488	22
7	x-Sacramento Kings	37	45	.451	25
8	x-San Antonio Spurs	35	47	.427	27
9	Phoenix Suns	32	50	.390	30
10	Los Angeles Clippers	32	50	.390	30
11	Seattle SuperSonics	31	51	.378	31
12	Golden State Warriors	30	52	.366	32

z - clinched division title
y - clinched division title
x - clinched playoff spot

== Player statistics ==
Legend
GP	Games played	GS	Games started	MPG	Minutes per game
FG%	Field-goal percentage	3P%	3-point field-goal percentage	FT%	Free-throw percentage
RPG	Rebounds per game	APG	Assists per game	SPG	Steals per game
BPG	Blocks per game	PPG	Points per game

== See also ==
- 1985-86 NBA season
