= 1985–86 Los Angeles Clippers season =

NBA professional basketball team season

- Head coach: Don Chaney
- General manager: Carl Scheer
- Owner: Donald Sterling
- Arena: Los Angeles Memorial Sports Arena

Results
- Record: 32–50 (.390)
- Place: Division: 4th (Pacific); Conference: 10th (Western)
- Playoff finish: Did not qualify
- Stats at Basketball Reference

Local media
- Television: KTLA (Phil Stone, Tom Hawkins)
- Radio: KLAC (Ralph Lawler, Ted Green, Pete Arbogast)

The 1985-86 Los Angeles Clippers season was their 16th season in the NBA, their second in Los Angeles.

== Draft picks ==
Round	Pick	Player	Position	Nationality	College
1	3	Benoit Benjamin	Center	United States	Creighton
3	52	Anicet Lavodrama	Forward	Central African Republic	Houston Baptist
4	74	Jim Deines	Center	United States; France	Arizona State
5	99	Wayne Carlander	Forward	United States	USC
6	121	Malcolm Thomas	Forward	United States	Missouri
7	143	Gary Maloncon	Forward	United States	UCLA

== Roster ==
1985–86 Los Angeles Clippers roster
Players

Pos.	No.	Player	Height	Weight	DOB	From
C	00	Benoit Benjamin	7 ft 0 in (2.13 m)	250 lb (113 kg)		Creighton
G	2	Junior Bridgeman	6 ft 5 in (1.96 m)	215 lb (98 kg)		Louisville
F	7	Michael Brooks (injured) (IN)	6 ft 7 in (2.01 m)	220 lb (100 kg)		La Salle
C	31	Wallace Bryant (waived)	7 ft 0 in (2.13 m)	245 lb (111 kg)		San Francisco
F/C	44	Michael Cage	6 ft 9 in (2.06 m)	235 lb (107 kg)		San Diego State
F	38	Jeff Cross	6 ft 10 in (2.08 m)	242 lb (110 kg)		Maine
G	14	Franklin Edwards	6 ft 1 in (1.85 m)	190 lb (86 kg)		Cleveland State
G	4	Lancaster Gordon	6 ft 3 in (1.91 m)	195 lb (88 kg)		Louisville
F	8	Marques Johnson	6 ft 7 in (2.01 m)	224 lb (102 kg)		UCLA
C	20	Ozell Jones	6 ft 11 in (2.11 m)	235 lb (107 kg)		Cal State Fullerton
F	19	Cedric Maxwell	6 ft 8 in (2.03 m)	225 lb (102 kg)		Charlotte
F	46	Jay Murphy (waived)	6 ft 9 in (2.06 m)	220 lb (100 kg)		Boston College
C	40	Kurt Nimphius	6 ft 11 in (2.11 m)	225 lb (102 kg)		Arizona State
G	10	Norm Nixon	6 ft 2 in (1.88 m)	170 lb (77 kg)		Duquesne
G	18	Derek Smith	6 ft 6 in (1.98 m)	218 lb (99 kg)		Louisville
G	21	Jim Thomas (waived)	6 ft 3 in (1.91 m)	190 lb (86 kg)		Indiana
G	1	Darnell Valentine	6 ft 1 in (1.85 m)	183 lb (83 kg)		Kansas
F	22	Rory White	6 ft 8 in (2.03 m)	215 lb (98 kg)		South Alabama
F	52	Jamaal Wilkes	6 ft 7 in (2.01 m)	190 lb (86 kg)		UCLA

Coaches
Head coach
- Don Chaney
Assistant(s)
- Don Casey
- Brad Greenberg

Legend
- (DP) Unsigned draft pick
- (FA) Free agent
- (S) Suspended
- Injured

=== Roster notes ===
- Forward Jamaal Wilkes becomes the 2nd Laker to play with the crosstown rival Clippers.
- Forward Rory White would later serve as an assistant coach for the Clippers under coach Mike Dunleavy Sr. from 2003 to 2008.

== Regular season ==
=== Season standings ===
Pacific Division	W	L	PCT	GB	Home	Road	Div
y-Los Angeles Lakers	62	20	.756	–	35–6	27–14	23–7
x-Portland Trail Blazers	40	42	.488	22	27–14	13–28	18–12
Phoenix Suns	32	50	.390	30	23–18	9–32	16–14
Los Angeles Clippers	32	50	.390	30	22–19	10–31	10–20
Seattle SuperSonics	31	51	.378	31	24–17	7–34	11–19
Golden State Warriors	30	52	.366	32	24–17	6–35	12–18

#	Western Conference				
#	Team	W	L	PCT	GB
1	c-Los Angeles Lakers	62	20	.756	–
2	y-Houston Rockets	51	31	.622	11
3	x-Denver Nuggets	47	35	.573	15
4	x-Dallas Mavericks	44	38	.537	18
5	x-Utah Jazz	42	40	.512	20
6	x-Portland Trail Blazers	40	42	.488	22
7	x-Sacramento Kings	37	45	.451	25
8	x-San Antonio Spurs	35	47	.427	27
9	Phoenix Suns	32	50	.390	30
10	Los Angeles Clippers	32	50	.390	30
11	Seattle SuperSonics	31	51	.378	31
12	Golden State Warriors	30	52	.366	32

z - clinched division title
y - clinched division title
x - clinched playoff spot

== Player statistics ==
Legend
GP	Games played	GS	Games started	MPG	Minutes per game
FG%	Field-goal percentage	3P%	3-point field-goal percentage	FT%	Free-throw percentage
RPG	Rebounds per game	APG	Assists per game	SPG	Steals per game
BPG	Blocks per game	PPG	Points per game

Player	GP	GS	MPG	FG%	3FG%	FT%	RPG	APG	SPG	BPG	PPG
Benoit Benjamin	79	37	26.4	.490	.333	.746	7.6	1.0	0.8	2.6	11.1
Junior Bridgeman	58	14	20.0	.441	.333	.891	2.1	1.9	0.5	0.1	8.8
Wallace Bryant	8	0	8.0	.222	.000	.625	2.5	0.5	0.3	0.4	1.6
Michael Cage	78	12	20.1	.479	.000	.649	5.3	1.0	0.8	0.4	6.7
Jeff Cross	21	0	6.1	.250	.000	.560	1.4	0.0	0.1	0.1	1.2
James Donaldson	14	14	31.5	.512	.000	.814	9.4	0.9	0.4	2.1	10.2
Franklin Edwards	73	19	20.4	.454	.111	.874	1.2	3.5	1.2	0.1	9.0
Lancaster Gordon	60	1	11.7	.377	.250	.804	1.1	1.0	0.6	0.2	5.2
Marques Johnson	75	75	34.7	.510	.067	.760	5.5	3.8	1.4	0.7	20.3
Ozell Jones	3	0	6.0	.000			0.7	0.0	0.7	0.3	0.0
Cedric Maxwell	76	72	32.3	.475	.000	.795	8.2	2.8	0.8	0.4	14.1
Jay Murphy	14	0	7.1	.356	.000	.643	1.1	0.2	0.3	0.2	2.9
Kurt Nimphius	67	62	29.0	.505	.000	.760	5.9	0.7	0.4	1.4	12.0
Norm Nixon	67	62	31.9	.438	.347	.809	2.7	8.6	1.3	0.0	14.6
Derek Smith	11	9	30.8	.552	.500	.690	3.7	2.8	0.8	1.2	23.5
Jim Thomas	6	0	11.5	.400		.500	1.3	2.0	0.8	0.2	2.2
Darnell Valentine	34	2	14.2	.379	.273	.787	1.6	3.1	0.7	0.0	5.9
Rory White	75	30	23.5	.519	.111	.739	2.4	1.0	1.0	0.1	11.7
Jamaal Wilkes	13	1	15.0	.400	.333	.815	2.2	1.2	0.5	0.2	5.8

== Awards, records and milestones ==
=== All-Star ===
Marques Johnson selected as a reserve forward for the Western Conference All-Stars. This would be his fifth and final All-Star Game appearance. With Norm Nixon chosen as an All-Star last year, this would make it the third time in franchise history that the team fielded a different player for back-to-back All-Star Games. The other two times were Bob Kauffman in 1973 then Bob McAdoo in 1974 and Bob McAdoo again in 1977 then Randy Smith in 1978.

== Transactions ==
The Clippers were involved in the following transactions during the 1985–86 season.

=== Trades ===
September 6, 1985
To Los Angeles Clippers

- Cedric Maxwell and 1986 first-round draft pick
To Boston Celtics

- Bill Walton
November 25, 1985
To Los Angeles Clippers

- Kurt Nimphius
To Dallas Mavericks

- James Donaldson
January 14, 1986
To Los Angeles Clippers

- Darnell Valentine
To Portland Trail Blazers

- 1986 first-round draft pick

=== Free agents ===
==== Additions ==== : Player / Signed / Former team	==== Subtractions ==== : Player / Left / New team
