= 1985–86 New York Knicks season =

Season of National Basketball Association team the New York Knicks

- Head coach: Hubie Brown
- General manager: Dave DeBusschere; Gordon Stirling
- Owners: Gulf+Western
- Arena: Madison Square Garden

Results
- Record: 23–59 (.280)
- Place: Division: 5th Conference: 11th
- Playoff finish: Did not qualify
- Stats at Basketball Reference

Local media
- Television: WOR-TV; MSG Network (Jim Karvellas, Butch Beard)
- Radio: WNBC (Marv Albert, John Andariese)

The 1985–86 New York Knicks season was the 40th season of NBA basketball in New York City, New York. The Knicks had won the first overall pick in the 1985 NBA draft in the league's first ever draft lottery, which they used to select Patrick Ewing out of Georgetown, who was regarded as the most sought-after prospect since Kareem Abdul-Jabbar in 1969 by The New York Times. He was signed to a six-year $17 million deal, the richest ever for an NBA rookie.

Despite Ewing struggling with injuries, he was named Rookie of the Year and was selected to play in the All-Star Game, however, he declined to play due to an injury.

Bernard King missed the entire season while recovering from his knee surgery.

== Draft picks ==
Round	Pick	Player	Position	Nationality	School/Club team
1	1	Patrick Ewing	C	United States	Georgetown
2	23	Gerald Wilkins	SG/SF	United States	Tennessee–Chattanooga
4	3	Fred Cofield	G	United States	Eastern Michigan
5	3	Mike Schlegel	C	United States	Virginia Commonwealth
6	3	Kent Lockhart	G	United States	Texas–El Paso
7	3	Ken Bantum	F	United States	Cornell

== Regular season ==
=== Season standings ===
Atlantic Division	W	L	PCT	GB	Home	Road	Div
y-Boston Celtics	67	15	.817	–	40–1	27–14	18–6
x-Philadelphia 76ers	54	28	.659	13	31–10	23–18	15–9
x-Washington Bullets	39	43	.476	28	26–15	13–28	11–13
x-New Jersey Nets	39	43	.476	28	26–15	13–28	11–13
New York Knicks	23	59	.280	44	15–26	8–33	5–19

#	Eastern Conference				
#	Team	W	L	PCT	GB
1	z-Boston Celtics	67	15	.817	–
2	y-Milwaukee Bucks	57	25	.695	10
3	x-Philadelphia 76ers	54	28	.659	13
4	x-Atlanta Hawks	50	32	.610	17
5	x-Detroit Pistons	46	36	.561	21
6	x-Washington Bullets	39	43	.476	28
7	x-New Jersey Nets	39	43	.476	28
8	x-Chicago Bulls	30	52	.366	37
9	Cleveland Cavaliers	29	53	.354	38
10	Indiana Pacers	26	56	.317	41
11	New York Knicks	23	59	.280	44

== Roster ==
New York Knicks roster
Players

Pos.	No.	Player	Height	Weight	DOB	From
PF	20	James Bailey	6 ft 9 in (2.06 m)	220 lb (100 kg)	1957–05–21	Rutgers
PF	1	Ken Bannister	6 ft 9 in (2.06 m)	235 lb (107 kg)	1960–04–01	St. Augustine's
C	25	Bill Cartwright	7 ft 1 in (2.16 m)	245 lb (111 kg)	1957–07–30	San Francisco
PG	35	Fred Cofield	6 ft 3 in (1.91 m)	190 lb (86 kg)	1962–01–04	Eastern Michigan
C	42	Pat Cummings	6 ft 9 in (2.06 m)	230 lb (104 kg)	1956–07–11	Cincinnati
C	33	Patrick Ewing	7 ft 0 in (2.13 m)	240 lb (109 kg)	1962–08–05	Georgetown
PF	3	Ken Green	6 ft 8 in (2.03 m)	215 lb (98 kg)	1959–09–19	Texas–Pan American
SF	18	Ernie Grunfeld	6 ft 6 in (1.98 m)	210 lb (95 kg)	1955–04–24	Tennessee
SF	30	Bernard King (injured)	6 ft 7 in (2.01 m)	205 lb (93 kg)	1956–12–04	Tennessee
PF	14	Chris McNealy	6 ft 7 in (2.01 m)	210 lb (95 kg)	1961–07–15	San José State
SF	55	Louis Orr	6 ft 8 in (2.03 m)	175 lb (79 kg)	1958–05–07	Syracuse
PG	2	Rory Sparrow	6 ft 2 in (1.88 m)	175 lb (79 kg)	1958–06–12	Villanova
PF	23	Bob Thornton	6 ft 10 in (2.08 m)	225 lb (102 kg)	1962–07–10	UC Irvine
SG	6	Trent Tucker	6 ft 5 in (1.96 m)	193 lb (88 kg)	1959–12–20	Minnesota
PG	4	Darrell Walker	6 ft 4 in (1.93 m)	180 lb (82 kg)	1961–03–09	Arkansas
SG	21	Gerald Wilkins	6 ft 6 in (1.98 m)	185 lb (84 kg)	1963–09–11	Chattanooga

Coaches
Head coach
- Hubie Brown
Assistant(s)
- Bob Hill

Legend
- (DP) Unsigned draft pick
- (FA) Free agent
- (S) Suspended
- Injured

== Player statistics ==
Legend
GP	Games played	GS	Games started	MPG	Minutes per game
FG%	Field-goal percentage	3P%	3-point field-goal percentage	FT%	Free-throw percentage
RPG	Rebounds per game	APG	Assists per game	SPG	Steals per game
BPG	Blocks per game	PPG	Points per game

== Awards and records ==
- Patrick Ewing, NBA All-Star Game Appearance
- Patrick Ewing, NBA Rookie of the Year
- Patrick Ewing, NBA All-Rookie Team

== See also ==
- 1985-86 NBA season
