= 1989–90 Atlanta Hawks season =

NBA professional basketball team season

- Head coach: Mike Fratello
- General manager: Pete Babcock
- Owners: Ted Turner / Turner Broadcasting System
- Arena: Omni Coliseum

Results
- Record: 41–41 (.500)
- Place: Division: 6th (Central); Conference: 9th (Eastern)
- Playoff finish: Did not qualify
- Stats at Basketball Reference

Local media
- Television: WTBS and TBS (Ron Thulin and Kevin Loughery)
- Radio: WCNN (Steve Holman)

The 1989–90 Atlanta Hawks season was the 41st season for the Atlanta Hawks in the National Basketball Association, and their 22nd season in Atlanta, Georgia.

== Season summary ==
=== Regular season ===
With Kevin Willis back after missing all of the previous season due to a foot injury, the Hawks lost their first three games of the regular season, but later on posted a seven-game winning streak between November and December, leading to a 13–6 start to the season. However, the team struggled posting two six-game losing streaks between January and February, as Doc Rivers only played just 48 games due to a herniated disk in his back. The Hawks fell below .500 in winning percentage, and held a 22–24 record at the All-Star break.

In January, the team signed free agent John Long, then at mid-season, they traded Antoine Carr to the Sacramento Kings in exchange for Kenny Smith. The Hawks continued to play around .500, as the team won ten of their final 15 games of the season, finishing in sixth place in the Central Division with a 41–41 record; however, they missed the NBA playoffs by finishing just one game behind the 8th–seeded Indiana Pacers.

Dominique Wilkins averaged 26.7 points, 6.5 rebounds and 1.6 steals per game, but was not named to an All-NBA Team at season's end, while Moses Malone averaged 18.9 points and 10.0 rebounds per game, and Rivers provided the team with 12.5 points, 5.5 assists and 2.4 steals per game. In addition, Willis averaged 12.4 points and 8.0 rebounds per game, while John Battle contributed 10.9 points per game, and Spud Webb provided with 9.2 points, 5.8 assists and 1.3 steals per game. Meanwhile, Long contributed 8.4 points per game, Cliff Levingston averaged 6.9 points and 4.3 rebounds per game, rookie small forward Alexander Volkov contributed 5.0 points per game, and Jon Koncak provided with 3.7 points and 4.2 rebounds per game.

During the NBA All-Star weekend at the Miami Arena in Miami, Florida, Wilkins was selected for the 1990 NBA All-Star Game, as a member of the Eastern Conference All-Star team. In addition, Wilkins also won the NBA Slam Dunk Contest for the second time; before the mid-season trade, Smith also participated in the Slam Dunk Contest while playing for the Kings, and finished second behind Wilkins. The Hawks finished 18th in the NBA in home-game attendance, with an attendance of 573,711 at the Omni Coliseum during the regular season.

=== Aftermath ===
Following the season, Smith was traded to the Houston Rockets, while Levingston signed as a free agent with the Chicago Bulls, Long retired, and head coach Mike Fratello resigned after coaching the Hawks for seven seasons.

== Draft picks ==
Round	Pick	Player	Position	Nationality	College
1	23	Roy Marble	SG/SF	United States	Iowa
2	49	Haywoode Workman	PG	United States	Oral Roberts

== Roster ==
1989–90 Atlanta Hawks roster
Players

Pos.	No.	Player	Height	Weight	DOB	From
G	10	John Battle	6 ft 2 in (1.88 m)	175 lb (79 kg)	1962–11–09	Rutgers
F	33	Duane Ferrell	6 ft 7 in (2.01 m)	208 lb (94 kg)	1965–02–28	Georgia Tech
C	32	Jon Koncak	7 ft 0 in (2.13 m)	250 lb (113 kg)	1963–05–17	SMU
F	53	Cliff Levingston	6 ft 8 in (2.03 m)	210 lb (95 kg)	1961–01–04	Wichita State
G	34	John Long	6 ft 5 in (1.96 m)	195 lb (88 kg)	1956–08–28	Detroit Mercy
F/C	2	Moses Malone	6 ft 10 in (2.08 m)	260 lb (118 kg)	1955–02–23	Petersburg HS (VA)
G	22	Roy Marble	6 ft 6 in (1.98 m)	190 lb (86 kg)	1966–12–13	Iowa
G	25	Doc Rivers	6 ft 4 in (1.93 m)	185 lb (84 kg)	1961–10–13	Marquette
G	31	Kenny Smith	6 ft 3 in (1.91 m)	170 lb (77 kg)	1965–03–08	North Carolina
C	8	Alexander Volkov	6 ft 10 in (2.08 m)	218 lb (99 kg)	1964–03–28	Ukraine
G	4	Spud Webb	5 ft 6 in (1.68 m)	133 lb (60 kg)	1963–07–13	NC State
F	21	Dominique Wilkins	6 ft 7 in (2.01 m)	200 lb (91 kg)	1960–01–12	Georgia
F/C	42	Kevin Willis	7 ft 0 in (2.13 m)	220 lb (100 kg)	1962–09–06	Michigan State

Coaches
Head coach
- Mike Fratello
Assistant(s)
- Brian Hill
- Cazzie Russell

Legend
- (DP) Unsigned draft pick
- (FA) Free agent
- (S) Suspended
- Injured

Roster
Updated: March 15, 1990

== Regular season ==
=== Season standings ===
Central Division	W	L	PCT	GB	Home	Road	Div
y-Detroit Pistons	59	23	.720	–	35–6	24–17	22–8
x-Chicago Bulls	55	27	.671	4	36–5	19–22	20–10
x-Milwaukee Bucks	44	38	.537	15	27–14	17–24	14–16
x-Cleveland Cavaliers	42	40	.512	17	27–14	15–26	14–16
x-Indiana Pacers	42	40	.512	17	28–13	14–27	16–14
Atlanta Hawks	41	41	.500	18	25–16	16–25	15–15
Orlando Magic	18	64	.220	41	12–29	6–35	4–26

#	Eastern Conference				
#	Team	W	L	PCT	GB
1	c-Detroit Pistons	59	23	.720	–
2	y-Philadelphia 76ers	53	29	.646	6
3	x-Chicago Bulls	55	27	.671	4
4	x-Boston Celtics	52	30	.634	7
5	x-New York Knicks	45	37	.549	14
6	x-Milwaukee Bucks	44	38	.537	15
7	x-Cleveland Cavaliers	42	40	.512	17
8	x-Indiana Pacers	42	40	.512	17
9	Atlanta Hawks	41	41	.500	18
10	Washington Bullets	31	51	.378	28
11	Miami Heat	18	64	.220	41
12	Orlando Magic	18	64	.220	41
13	New Jersey Nets	17	65	.207	42

z - clinched division title
y - clinched division title
x - clinched playoff spot

== Player statistics ==
Legend
GP	Games played	GS	Games started	MPG	Minutes per game
FG%	Field-goal percentage	3P%	3-point field-goal percentage	FT%	Free-throw percentage
RPG	Rebounds per game	APG	Assists per game	SPG	Steals per game
BPG	Blocks per game	PPG	Points per game

Player	GP	GS	MPG	FG%	3P%	FT%	RPG	APG	SPG	BPG	PPG
Dominique Wilkins	80	79	36.1	48.4	32.2	80.7	6.5	2.5	1.6	0.6	26.7
Moses Malone	81	81	33.8	48.0	11.1	78.1	10.0	1.6	0.6	1.0	18.9
Doc Rivers	48	44	31.8	45.4	36.4	81.2	4.2	5.5	2.4	0.5	12.5
Kevin Willis	81	51	28.1	51.9	28.6	68.3	8.0	0.7	0.8	0.6	12.4
John Battle	60	48	24.6	50.6	15.4	75.6	1.7	2.6	0.5	0.1	10.9
Spud Webb	82	46	26.6	47.7	5.3	87.1	2.5	5.8	1.3	0.1	9.2
John Long	48	19	21.5	45.3	34.5	83.6	1.7	1.8	0.9	0.1	8.4
Kenny Smith	33	5	20.4	48.0	16.7	84.6	1.1	4.3	0.7	0.0	7.7
Antoine Carr	44	0	18.3	51.6	0.0	77.5	3.4	1.2	0.3	0.8	7.6
Cliff Levingston	75	5	22.7	50.9	20.0	68.0	4.3	1.1	0.7	0.5	6.9
Alexander Volkov	72	4	13.0	48.2	38.2	58.3	1.7	1.2	0.5	0.3	5.0
Wes Matthews	1	0	13.0	33.3	0.0	100.0	0.0	5.0	0.0	0.0	4.0
Jon Koncak	54	28	18.1	61.4	0.0	53.2	4.2	0.4	0.7	0.6	3.7
Sedric Toney	32	0	8.9	41.7	53.8	84.0	0.4	1.6	0.3	0.0	2.8
Roy Marble	24	0	6.8	27.6	0.0	65.5	1.0	0.5	0.3	0.0	2.1
Haywoode Workman	6	0	2.7	66.7	0.0	100.0	0.5	0.3	0.5	0.0	1.0
Duane Ferrell	14	0	2.1	35.7	0.0	33.3	0.5	0.1	0.1	0.0	0.9
Mike Williams	5	0	2.8	0.0	0.0	0.0	0.2	0.0	0.0	0.0	0.0

Player statistics citation:

== See also ==
- 1989-90 NBA season
