= 1990–91 Atlanta Hawks season =

NBA professional basketball team season

- Head coach: Bob Weiss
- General manager: Pete Babcock
- Owners: Ted Turner / Turner Broadcasting System
- Arena: Omni Coliseum

Results
- Record: 43–39 (.524)
- Place: Division: 4th (Central); Conference: 6th (Eastern)
- Playoff finish: First round (lost to Pistons 2–3)
- Stats at Basketball Reference

Local media
- Television: WTBS; WGNX; SportSouth; TBS (Skip Caray and Rick Barry)

The 1990–91 Atlanta Hawks season was the 42nd season for the Atlanta Hawks in the National Basketball Association, and their 23rd season in Atlanta, Georgia.

== Season summary ==
=== Off-season ===
The Hawks received the tenth overall pick in the 1990 NBA draft from the Golden State Warriors via trade, and selected point guard Rumeal Robinson from the University of Michigan. During the off-season, the team signed free agent and former All-Star guard Sidney Moncrief, who came out of his retirement after a one-year absence from the NBA; Moncrief previously played for the Milwaukee Bucks, and retired after the 1988–89 season due to knee problems. The team also hired Bob Weiss as their new head coach.

=== Regular season ===
Under Weiss, and with the addition of Robinson and Moncrief, the Hawks won four of their first five games of the regular season, but then struggled posting a nine-game losing streak afterwards, posting a 4–10 record in November. However, the team soon recovered and played above .500 in winning percentage for the remainder of the season, winning 20 of their next 25 games, including a seven-game winning streak between December and January, and holding a 26–21 record at the All-Star break. The Hawks continued to play around .500 for the remainder of the season, and finished in fourth place in the Central Division with a 43–39 record, earning the sixth seed in the Eastern Conference, and returning to the NBA playoffs after a one-year absence.

Dominique Wilkins averaged 25.9 points, 9.0 rebounds and 1.5 steals per game, and was named to the All-NBA Second Team. In addition, Doc Rivers averaged 15.2 points, 4.3 assists and 1.9 steals per game, while Spud Webb provided the team with 13.4 points, 5.6 assists and 1.6 steals per game, and Kevin Willis provided with 13.1 points and 8.8 rebounds per game. Off the bench, John Battle contributed 13.6 points per game, while Moses Malone played a sixth man role, averaging 10.6 points and 8.1 rebounds per game, Duane Ferrell averaged 6.1 points per game, Robinson provided with 5.6 points and 2.8 assists per game, Moncrief contributed 4.7 points per game, and starting center Jon Koncak averaged 4.1 points and 4.9 rebounds per game.

During the NBA All-Star weekend at the Charlotte Coliseum in Charlotte, North Carolina, Wilkins was selected for the 1991 NBA All-Star Game, as a member of the Eastern Conference All-Star team; he was also selected to participate in the NBA Slam Dunk Contest, but withdrew and was replaced with Blue Edwards of the Utah Jazz. Wilkins finished in eighth place in Most Valuable Player voting, while Malone finished tied in sixth place in Sixth Man of the Year voting, and Webb finished tied in eighth place in Most Improved Player voting.

The Hawks finished 19th in the NBA in home-game attendance, with an attendance of 529,161 at the Omni Coliseum during the regular season.

=== NBA playoffs ===
In the Eastern Conference First Round of the 1991 NBA playoffs, the Hawks faced off against the 3rd–seeded, and 2-time defending NBA champion Detroit Pistons, who were led by the All-Star trio of Isiah Thomas, Joe Dumars, and Defensive Player of the Year, Dennis Rodman. The Hawks managed to win Game 1 over the Pistons on the road, 103–98 at The Palace of Auburn Hills, but then lost the next two games as the Pistons took a 2–1 series lead. The Hawks won Game 4 over the Pistons at home, 123–111 at the Omni Coliseum to even the series. However, the Hawks lost Game 5 to the Pistons at The Palace of Auburn Hills, 113–81, thus losing in a hard-fought five-game series.

=== Aftermath ===
Following the season, Rivers was traded to the Los Angeles Clippers on draft day after eight seasons with the Hawks, while Webb was traded to the Sacramento Kings, Malone signed as a free agent with the Milwaukee Bucks, Battle signed with the Cleveland Cavaliers, and Moncrief retired for the second time.

== Draft picks ==
Round	Pick	Player	Position	Nationality	College
1	10	Rumeal Robinson	PG	United States	Michigan
2	36	Trevor Wilson	SF	United States	UCLA
2	41	Steve Bardo	SG	United States	Illinois

== Roster ==
1990–91 Atlanta Hawks roster
Players

Pos.	No.	Player	Height	Weight	DOB	From
G	10	John Battle	6 ft 2 in (1.88 m)	175 lb (79 kg)	1962–11–09	Rutgers
F	33	Duane Ferrell	6 ft 7 in (2.01 m)	208 lb (94 kg)	1965–02–28	Georgia Tech
C	32	Jon Koncak	7 ft 0 in (2.13 m)	250 lb (113 kg)	1963–05–17	SMU
C	34	Gary Leonard	7 ft 1 in (2.16 m)	250 lb (113 kg)	1967–02–16	Missouri
F/C	2	Moses Malone	6 ft 10 in (2.08 m)	260 lb (118 kg)	1955–03–23
C	40	Tim McCormick	6 ft 11 in (2.11 m)	240 lb (109 kg)	1962–03–10	Michigan
G	15	Sidney Moncrief	6 ft 3 in (1.91 m)	180 lb (82 kg)	1957–09–21	Arkansas
G	25	Doc Rivers	6 ft 4 in (1.93 m)	185 lb (84 kg)	1961–10–13	Marquette University
G	22	Rumeal Robinson	6 ft 2 in (1.88 m)	195 lb (88 kg)	1966–11–13	Michigan
G	4	Spud Webb	5 ft 6 in (1.68 m)	133 lb (60 kg)	1963–07–13	NC State
F	21	Dominique Wilkins	6 ft 7 in (2.01 m)	200 lb (91 kg)	1960–01–12	Georgia
F/C	42	Kevin Willis	7 ft 0 in (2.13 m)	220 lb (100 kg)	1962–09–06	Michigan State

Coaches
Head coach
- Bob Weiss
Assistant(s)
- Johnny Davis
- Kevin Loughery

Legend
- (DP) Unsigned draft pick
- (FA) Free agent
- (S) Suspended
- Injured

== Regular season ==
=== Season standings ===
Central Division	W	L	PCT	GB	Home	Road	Div
y-Chicago Bulls	61	21	.744	—	35–6	26–15	25–5
x-Detroit Pistons	50	32	.610	11	32–9	18–23	19–11
x-Milwaukee Bucks	48	34	.585	13	33–8	15–26	16–14
x-Atlanta Hawks	43	39	.524	18	29–12	14–27	11–19
x-Indiana Pacers	41	41	.500	20	29–12	12–29	15–15
Cleveland Cavaliers	33	49	.402	28	23–18	10–31	11–19
Charlotte Hornets	26	56	.317	35	17–24	9–32	8–22

y – clinched division title
x – clinched playoff spot

#	Eastern Conference				
#	Team	W	L	PCT	GB
1	c-Chicago Bulls	61	21	.744	–
2	y-Boston Celtics	56	26	.683	5
3	x-Detroit Pistons	50	32	.610	11
4	x-Milwaukee Bucks	48	34	.585	13
5	x-Philadelphia 76ers	44	38	.537	17
6	x-Atlanta Hawks	43	39	.524	18
7	x-Indiana Pacers	41	41	.500	20
8	x-New York Knicks	39	43	.476	22
9	Cleveland Cavaliers	33	49	.402	28
10	Washington Bullets	30	52	.366	31
11	New Jersey Nets	26	56	.317	35
12	Charlotte Hornets	26	56	.317	35
13	Miami Heat	24	58	.293	37

z – clinched division title
y – clinched division title
x – clinched playoff spot

== Game logs ==
=== Regular season ===
1990–91 game log
Total: 43–39 (home: 29–12; road: 14–27)
November: 4–10 (home: 2–5; road: 2–5)

Game	Date	Team	Score	High points	High rebounds	High assists	Location Attendance	Record
1	November 2	Orlando	W 115–111	D. Wilkins (32)	K. Willis (11)	D. Wilkins, R. Robinson (8)	Omni Coliseum; 13,593	1–0
2	November 3	Indiana	W 121–120	D. Wilkins (30)	M. Malone (14)	R. Robinson (10)	Omni Coliseum; 10,330	2–0
3	November 6	@ Sacramento	W 102–85	D. Wilkins (24)	K. Willis (9)	D. Wilkins (6)	ARCO Arena; 17,014	3–0
4	November 9	@ Golden State	L 128–143	D. Wilkins (21)	K. Willis (10)	M. Malone (6)	Oakland–Alameda County Coliseum Arena; 15,025	3–1
5	November 10	@ L.A. Clippers	W 112–94	G. Rivers (23)	K. Willis (16)	G. Rivers (9)	Los Angeles Memorial Sports Arena; 13,228	4–1
6	November 13	Cleveland	L 128–143	D. Wilkins (27)	K. Willis (13)	M. Malone (6)	Omni Coliseum; 15,025	4–2
7	November 14	@ Philadelphia	L 104–112	K. Willis (28)	M. Malone (13)	J. Battle (5)	The Spectrum; 13,613	4–3
8	November 16	Charlotte	L 109–119	D. Wilkins (27)	K. Willis (11)	J. Battle (6)	Omni Coliseum; 11,042	4–4
9	November 17	@ Detroit	L 83–91	J. Battle (16)	K. Willis (10)	A. Webb (5)	The Palace of Auburn Hills; 21,454	4–5
10	November 20	@ Charlotte	L 121–128	D. Wilkins (29)	D. Wilkins (10)	D. Wilkins (7)	Charlotte Coliseum; 23,901	4–6
11	November 21	@ Milwaukee	L 93–105	M. Malone (22)	K. Willis (10)	D. Wilkins (6)	Bradley Center; 15,279	4–7
12	November 24	Philadelphia	L 121–124	D. Wilkins (39)	M. Malone (11)	A. Webb (14)	Omni Coliseum; 15,594	4–8
13	November 27	Detroit	L 97–120	K. Willis, A. Webb (16)	K. Willis (8)	A. Webb (4)	Omni Coliseum; 13,718	4–9
14	November 30	Cleveland	L 93–101	D. Wilkins (25)	D. Wilkins (11)	A. Webb (7)	Omni Coliseum; 11,996	4–10

December: 11–3 (home: 6–1; road: 5–2)

Game	Date	Team	Score	High points	High rebounds	High assists	Location Attendance	Record
15	December 4	@ Houston	W 113–110	G. Rivers (26)	D. Wilkins, M. Malone, J. Koncak (7)	A. Webb (8)	The Summit; 13,578	5–10
16	December 5	@ San Antonio	W 110–108	G. Rivers (25)	K. Willis (8)	G. Rivers (7)	HemisFair Arena; 15,908	6–10
17	December 7	Milwaukee	L 103–104	G. Rivers (24)	T. McCormick (8)	G. Rivers, A. Webb (5)	Omni Coliseum; 9,586	6–11
18	December 8	New York	W 99–86	D. Wilkins (26)	G. Rivers, J. Koncak (9)	D. Wilkins (8)	Omni Coliseum; 14,142	7–11
19	December 12	@ Miami	W 118–93	D. Wilkins (28)	D. Wilkins (14)	A. Webb (11)	Miami Arena; 15,008	8–11
20	December 13	New Jersey	W 106–97	D. Wilkins (23)	K. Willis, M. Malone (10)	J. Battle (7)	Omni Coliseum; 9,107	9–11
21	December 15	Washington	W 125–113	J. Battle (28)	K. Willis (8)	G. Rivers (6)	Omni Coliseum; 10,830	10–11
22	December 17	@ Cleveland	W 109–98	D. Wilkins (32)	J. Koncak (13)	G. Rivers (10)	Coliseum at Richfield; 11,822	11–11
23	December 20	Utah	W 105–87	D. Wilkins (20)	K. Willis (11)	A. Webb (7)	Omni Coliseum; 10,504	12–11
24	December 21	@ Detroit	L 87–113	J. Battle (22)	D. Wilkins (7)	T. Wilson, R. Robinson (3)	The Palace of Auburn Hills; 21,454	12–12
25	December 23	@ Boston	L 104–132	J. Battle (16)	D. Ferrell (10)	T. Wilson, J. Koncak, G. Rivers, J. Battle (3)	Boston Garden; 14,890	12–13
26	December 26	@ New Jersey	W 113–111	K. Willis (26)	K. Willis (15)	D. Wilkins, J. Battle (4)	Brendan Byrne Arena; 11,455	13–13
27	December 28	Boston	W 131–114	G. Rivers (36)	M. Malone (9)	A. Webb (8)	Omni Coliseum; 16,390	14–13
28	December 29	Golden State	W 134–130	D. Wilkins (45)	D. Wilkins (14)	A. Webb (13)	Omni Coliseum; 11,860	15–13

January: 9–7 (home: 8–0; road: 1–7)

Game	Date	Team	Score	High points	High rebounds	High assists	Location Attendance	Record
29	January 2	L.A. Clippers	W 120–107	D. Wilkins (35)	D. Wilkins (16)	G. Rivers (11)	Omni Coliseum; 8,733	16–13
30	January 4	Indiana	W 111–96	D. Wilkins (36)	M. Malone (11)	G. Rivers, R. Robinson (5)	Omni Coliseum; 10,124	17–13
31	January 5	Minnesota	W 117-112 (OT)	J. Battle (27)	K. Willis (19)	J. Koncak (7)	Omni Coliseum; 10,988	18–13
32	January 8	San Antonio	W 109–98	D. Wilkins (40)	K. Willis (9)	G. Rivers (10)	Omni Coliseum; 12,608	19–13
33	January 11	@ Chicago	L 96–99	D. Wilkins (23)	D. Wilkins (12)	J. Battle (7)	Chicago Stadium; 18,676	19–14
34	January 12	@ New York	L 92–99	D. Wilkins (22)	G. Rivers (8)	G. Rivers, R. Robinson (6)	Madison Square Garden; 17,457	19–15
35	January 14	New York	W 96–82	D. Wilkins (26)	D. Wilkins (16)	J. Battle, S. Moncrief (4)	Omni Coliseum; 12,612	20–15
36	January 15	@ Indiana	W 117–106	D. Wilkins (28)	D. Wilkins (12)	J. Battle (8)	Market Square Arena; 9,531	21–15
37	January 18	Chicago	W 114–105	D. Wilkins (34)	M. Malone (12)	G. Rivers (5)	Omni Coliseum; 16,390	22–15
38	January 19	New Jersey	W 114–84	K. Willis (24)	K. Willis (17)	A. Webb (6)	Omni Coliseum; 15,758	23–15
39	January 22	Miami	W 118–107	K. Willis (29)	K. Willis (10)	G. Rivers, A. Webb, D. Wilkins (7)	Omni Coliseum; 10,440	24–15
40	January 23	@ Washington	L 99–104	D. Wilkins (27)	D. Wilkins (13)	G. Rivers (7)	Capital Centre; 9,830	24–16
41	January 26	@ Seattle	L 102–103	D. Wilkins (43)	D. Wilkins (10)	A. Webb (9)	Seattle Center Coliseum; 12,792	24–17
42	January 28	@ Portland	L 111–116	D. Wilkins (34)	K. Willis (10)	A. Webb (11)	Memorial Coliseum; 12,884	24–18
43	January 29	@ Utah	L 105–116	D. Wilkins (24)	D. Wilkins (14)	A. Webb (4)	Salt Palace; 12,616	24–19
44	January 31	@ L.A. Lakers	L 103–116	D. Wilkins (19)	M. Malone (9)	G. Rivers (4)	Great Western Forum; 17,505	24–20

February: 8–5 (home: 7–0; road: 1–5)

Game	Date	Team	Score	High points	High rebounds	High assists	Location Attendance	Record
45	February 2	@ Denver	L 125–126	D. Wilkins (34)	D. Wilkins (12)	D. Wilkins (7)	McNichols Sports Arena; 14,683	24–21
46	February 5	Cleveland	W 118–114	D. Wilkins (40)	D. Wilkins (13)	G. Rivers (12)	Omni Coliseum; 11,354	25–21
47	February 7	Charlotte	W 127–114	M. Malone (25)	J. Koncak (11)	A. Webb (6)	Omni Coliseum; 10,671	26–21
48	February 12	@ Chicago	L 113–122	D. Wilkins (37)	D. Wilkins, M.Malone (11)	A. Webb (9)	Chicago Stadium; 18,595	26–22
49	February 13	@ New Jersey	L 106–140	D. Wilkins (24)	K. Willis (8)	A. Webb (3)	Brendan Byrne Arena; 10,583	26–23
50	February 16	Seattle	W 122–113	D. Wilkins (36)	D. Wilkins (10)	A. Webb (14)	Omni Coliseum; 15,924	27–23
51	February 19	@ New York	W 110–102	D. Wilkins (32)	M. Malone (13)	G. Rivers (9)	Madison Square Garden; 13,791	28–23
52	February 20	@ New York	L 89–97	D. Wilkins (19)	M. Malone (10)	A. Webb (6)	The Palace of Auburn Hills; 21,454	28–24
53	February 22	L.A. Lakers	W 111–102	D. Wilkins (34)	M. Malone (13)	A. Webb (6)	Omni Coliseum; 16,371	29–24
54	February 23	Dallas	W 122–107	D. Wilkins (31)	D. Wilkins (14)	A. Webb (7)	Omni Coliseum; 12,376	30–24
55	February 23	Sacramento	W 96–88	D. Wilkins (31)	D. Wilkins (19)	J. Battle (4)	Omni Coliseum; 10,461	31–24
56	February 27	@ Philadelphia	L 103–107	D. Wilkins (26)	M. Malone (17)	A. Webb (10)	The Spectrum; 16,121	31–25
57	February 28	Portland	W 117–109	J. Battle (26)	D. Wilkins (14)	G. Rivers (8)	Omni Coliseum; 14,297	32–25

March: 6–9 (home: 3–4; road: 3–5)

Game	Date	Team	Score	High points	High rebounds	High assists	Location Attendance	Record
58	March 3	@ Milwaukee	W 115–106	D. Wilkins (25)	D. Wilkins, M. Malone (11)	A. Webb (5)	Bradley Center; 16,341	33–25
59	March 5	Denver	W 139–127	A. Webb (32)	D. Wilkins (18)	J. Battle (5)	Omni Coliseum; 13,500	34–25
60	March 7	Phoenix	L 104–106	D. Wilkins (27)	M. Malone (19)	G. Rivers, A. Webb, D. Wilkins(4)	Omni Coliseum; 12,184	34–26
61	March 8	@ Miami	W 102–96	G. Rivers (19)	Kevin Willis (12)	D. Wilkins (6)	Miami Arena; 15,008	35–26
62	March 10	Chicago	L 87–122	A. Webb (18)	D. Wilkins (8)	A. Webb (8)	Omni Coliseum; 16,371	35–27
63	March 12	Philadelphia	L 129–133 (2 OT)	D. Wilkins (29)	K. Willis (14)	G. Rivers (9)	Omni Coliseum; 13,372	35–28
64	March 15	@ Dallas	W 127–117	J. Battle (28)	M. Malone (14)	A. Webb (6)	Reunion Arena; 17,007	36–28
65	March 16	@ Phoenix	L 116–128	D. Wilkins (29)	D. Wilkins (10)	G. Rivers, A. Webb, D. Wilkins (5)	Arizona Veterans Memorial Coliseum; 14,487	36–29
66	March 19	Boston	W 104–92	A. Webb (26)	M. Malone (11)	A. Webb (5)	Omni Coliseum; 15,793	37–29
67	March 20	@ Chicago	L 107–129	D. Wilkins (28)	M. Malone (10)	G. Rivers (7)	Chicago Stadium; 18,439	37–30
68	March 22	@ Washington	L 116–121	D. Wilkins (26)	K. Willis (10)	A. Webb (4)	Capital Centre; 10,409	37–31
69	March 23	Miami	W 108–93	D. Wilkins (26)	J. Koncak, M. Malone, D. Wilkins (9)	G. Rivers, D. Wilkins (4)	Omni Coliseum; 14,159	38–31
70	March 26	@ Indiana	L 113–123	D. Wilkins (34)	J. Koncak (10)	A. Webb (7)	Market Square Arena; 10,178	38–32
71	March 28	Houston	L 111–112	D. Wilkins (28)	K. Willis (17)	A. Webb (7)	Omni Coliseum; 13,208	38–33
72	March 30	@ Milwaukee	L 96–104	D. Wilkins (27)	J. Koncak, D. Wilkins (13)	D. Wilkins (5)	Bradley Center; 17,683	38–34

April: 5–5 (home: 3–2; road: 2–3)

Game	Date	Team	Score	High points	High rebounds	High assists	Location Attendance	Record
73	April 4	@ Charlotte	L 91–98	D. Wilkins (26)	J. Koncak (12)	A. Webb (6)	Charlotte Coliseum; 23,901	38–35
74	April 6	Indiana	W 137–110	D. Wilkins (30)	K. Willis (13)	A. Webb (9)	Omni Coliseum; 14,931	39–35
75	April 8	Washington	W 105–94	D. Wilkins (29)	M. Malone (9)	A. Webb (7)	Omni Coliseum; 13,339	40–35
76	April 9	@ Cleveland	W 104–98	D. Wilkins (25)	K. Willis (14)	A. Webb (9)	Coliseum at Richfield; 15,235	41–35
77	April 11	@ Minnesota	W 98–112	A. Webb (23)	K. Willis (8)	G. Rivers (5)	Target Center; 19,006	41–36
78	April 13	Milwaukee	W 97–91	A. Webb (23)	M. Malone (11)	A. Webb (6)	Omni Coliseum; 14,687	42–36
79	April 16	@ Orlando	L 106–113	D. Wilkins (19)	D. Wilkins (8)	R. Robinson (6)	Orlando Arena; 15,077	42–37
80	April 17	Charlotte	L 111–123	D. Wilkins (20)	K. Willis (16)	A. Webb (5)	Omni Coliseum; 12,783	42–38
81	April 19	Detroit	L 120–126	D. Wilkins (38)	M. Malone (12)	A. Webb (5)	Omni Coliseum; 16,390	42–39
82	April 21	@ Boston	W 117–105	D. Wilkins (24)	D. Wilkins (9)	G. Rivers, A. Webb (5)	Boston Garden; 14,890	43–39

1990–91 season schedule

=== Playoffs ===
1991 playoff game log
First round: 2–3 (home: 1–1; road: 1–2)

Game	Date	Team	Score	High points	High rebounds	High assists	Location Attendance	Series
1	April 26	@ Detroit	W 103–98	Dominique Wilkins (32)	Kevin Willis (8)	Battle, Webb (3)	The Palace of Auburn Hills; 21,454	1–0
2	April 28	@ Detroit	L 88–101	Dominique Wilkins (20)	Kevin Willis (9)	Dominique Wilkins (5)	The Palace of Auburn Hills; 21,454	1–1
3	April 30	Detroit	L 91–103	Kevin Willis (24)	Kevin Willis (10)	Spud Webb (9)	Omni Coliseum; 13,571	1–2
4	May 2	Detroit	W 123–111	Doc Rivers (34)	Wilkins, Malone (11)	Spud Webb (7)	Omni Coliseum; 9,854	2–2
5	May 5	@ Detroit	L 81–113	Kevin Willis (13)	Kevin Willis (13)	Jon Koncak (4)	The Palace of Auburn Hills; 21,454	2–3

1991 schedule

== Player statistics ==
Legend
GP	Games played	GS	Games started	MPG	Minutes per game
FG%	Field-goal percentage	3P%	3-point field-goal percentage	FT%	Free-throw percentage
RPG	Rebounds per game	APG	Assists per game	SPG	Steals per game
BPG	Blocks per game	PPG	Points per game

=== Season ===
Player	GP	GS	MPG	FG%	3P%	FT%	RPG	APG	SPG	BPG	PPG
John Battle	79	2	23.6	.461	.286	.854	2.0	2.7	0.6	0.1	13.6
Duane Ferrell	78	2	14.9	.489	.667	.801	2.3	0.7	0.4	0.3	6.1
Jon Koncak	77	61	25.1	.436	.125	.593	4.9	1.6	1.0	1.0	4.1
Gary Leonard*	4	0	2.3	.000	.000	.500	0.5	0.0	0.0	0.3	0.5
Moses Malone	82	15	23.3	.468	.000	.831	8.1	0.8	0.4	0.9	10.6
Tim McCormick	56	7	12.3	.497	.000	.733	2.9	0.6	0.2	0.3	4.5
Sidney Moncrief	72	3	15.2	.488	.328	.781	1.8	1.4	0.7	0.1	4.7
Doc Rivers	79	79	32.7	.435	.336	.844	3.2	4.3	1.9	0.6	15.2
Rumeal Robinson	47	16	14.3	.446	.182	.588	1.5	2.8	0.7	0.2	5.6
Spud Webb	75	64	29.3	.447	.321	.868	2.3	5.6	1.6	0.1	13.4
Dominique Wilkins	81	81	38.0	.470	.341	.829	9.0	3.3	1.5	0.8	25.9
Kevin Willis	80	80	29.7	.504	.400	.668	8.8	1.2	0.8	0.5	13.1
Trevor Wilson*	25	0	6.5	.300	.000	.500	1.6	0.4	0.2	0.0	2.2
Howard Wright*	4	0	5.0	.667	.000	1.000	1.5	0.0	0.0	0.0	1.3

*Statistics with the Atlanta Hawks

=== Playoffs ===
Player	GP	GS	MPG	FG%	3P%	FT%	RPG	APG	SPG	BPG	PPG
John Battle	5	0	21.4	.364	.400	.960	2.0	2.2	0.2	0.0	2.2
Duane Ferrell	5	0	14.6	.444	.000	.667	3.4	0.6	0.0	0.0	4.8
Jon Koncak	5	5	26.6	.286	.000	1.000	4.6	1.4	0.4	0.8	1.4
Gary Leonard	2	0	2.5	1.000	.000	.000	1.0	0.0	0.0	0.0	2.0
Moses Malone	5	0	16.8	.200	.000	.929	6.2	0.6	0.6	0.2	4.2
Tim McCormick	2	0	6.5	.286	.000	.667	2.9	1.0	0.0	0.0	3.0
Sidney Moncrief	5	0	18.2	.500	.167	.813	3.2	0.4	0.6	0.0	7.2
Doc Rivers	5	5	34.6	.469	.091	.895	4.0	3.0	1.0	0.4	15.6
Rumeal Robinson	2	0	6.5	.250	.000	.000	0.5	0.5	0.5	0.0	1.0
Spud Webb	5	5	30.8	.439	.417	.688	4.4	4.8	1.4	0.2	13.2
Dominique Wilkins	5	5	39.0	.372	.133	.914	6.4	2.6	1.8	1.0	20.8
Kevin Willis	5	5	31.8	.403	.667	.700	9.0	1.0	0.6	0.2	15.4

Player statistics citation:

== Awards ==
=== Season ===
- Dominique Wilkins was named to the All-NBA Second Team

=== All-Star ===
- Dominique Wilkins was selected to his 6th All-Star Game.

== Transactions ==
=== Trades ===
June 27, 1990	To Atlanta Hawks The 10th pick in the 1990 NBA draft (Rumeal Robinson) The 36th pick in the 1990 NBA draft (Trevor Wilson) The 41st pick in the 1990 NBA draft (Steve Bardo)	To Golden State Warriors The 11th pick in the 1990 NBA draft (Tyrone Hill) The 28th pick in the 1990 NBA draft (Les Jepsen)
September 27, 1990	To Atlanta Hawks John Lucas II Tim McCormick	To Houston Rockets Roy Marble Kenny Smith

=== Free agents ===
==== Additions ====
Player	Signed	Former team
Howard Wright	September 24	free agent
Sidney Moncrief	October 4	Milwaukee Bucks
Scott Haffner	October 4	Miami Heat
Duane Ferrell	November 2	re-signed
Gary Leonard	January 7	Minnesota Timberwolves (re-signed on March 1, 1991)

==== Subtractions ====
Player	Left	New team
Haywoode Workman	September 25	Washington Bullets
Cliff Levingston	October 3	Chicago Bulls

=== Waivings ===
Player	Left
Steve Bardo	October 19
Scott Haffner	October 22
Howard Wright	November 13
Trevor Wilson	April 1

Player Transactions Citation:

== See also ==
- 1990–91 NBA season
