= Cliff Levingston =

American basketball player-coach

Las Vegas Stars
- Title: Head coach
- League: The Basketball League

Personal information
- Born: January 4, 1961 (age 65) San Diego, California, U.S.
- Listed height: 6 ft 8 in (2.03 m)
- Listed weight: 210 lb (95 kg)

Career information
- High school: Samuel F. B. Morse (San Diego, California)
- College: Wichita State (1979–1982)
- NBA draft: 1982: 1st round, 9th overall pick
- Drafted by: Detroit Pistons
- Playing career: 1982–1995
- Position: Power forward
- Number: 53
- Coaching career: 2000–present

Career history

Playing
- 1982–1984: Detroit Pistons
- 1984–1990: Atlanta Hawks
- 1990–1992: Chicago Bulls
- 1992–1993: PAOK
- 1993–1994: Buckler Bologna
- 1994–1995: Denver Nuggets

Coaching
- 2000–2001: Fort Wayne Fury (assistant)
- 2001–2002: Dodge City Legend (assistant)
- 2002–2003: Dodge City Legend
- 2003–2004: Harlem Globetrotters (assistant)
- 2004–2005: St. Louis Flight
- 2005–2006: Gary Steelheads (assistant)
- 2006: Kansas Cagerz (assistant)
- 2007: Gary Steelheads
- 2007–2011: Oklahoma Cavalry
- 2011–2012: Michigan City Marquette High School
- 2012–2013: Rochester Razorsharks
- 2020–2023: Kokomo BobKats
- 2024–2025: Santa Anna Thunder
- 2025–present: Las Vegas Stars

Career highlights
- 2× NBA champion (1991, 1992); Italian League champion (1994); 2× First-team All-MVC (1981, 1982); Second-team All-MVC (1980); No. 54 retired by Wichita State Shockers

Career NBA statistics
- Points: 5,888 (7.1 ppg)
- Rebounds: 4,307 (5.2 rpg)
- Assists: 752 (0.9 apg)
- Stats at NBA.com
- Stats at Basketball Reference

Clifford Eugene Levingston (born January 4, 1961) is an American professional basketball coach and former player.

== Professional playing career ==
A former power forward, Levingston played in the National Basketball Association (NBA). Levingston starred at Wichita State University, before being drafted by the Detroit Pistons in the 1982 NBA draft. After two seasons with the Pistons, he was traded to the Atlanta Hawks, with whom he would spend most of his career.

In 1986, while playing for the Hawks, Levingston had the rare distinction of "fouling into" an NBA game. In a game where Dominique Wilkins and Antoine Carr were injured, Kevin Willis, Scott Hastings, Jon Koncak, Spud Webb, and Levingston fouled out of the game. After Doc Rivers was ejected, the Hawks were down to only four players. Under NBA Rule 3-I-b, Levingston, the last player to foul out, was allowed to come back into the game, under the player foul penalty situation, resulting in a non-unsportsmanlike conduct technical foul.

After six seasons with the Hawks, Levingston joined the Chicago Bulls, with whom he won two championship rings in 1991 and 1992. From 1992 to 1994, he played with PAOK of the Greek Basket League, and as such he played in the final four of FIBA European League (now called EuroLeague). In 1993, he moved to Virtus Bologna of the Italian Serie A, where he won the national title in 1994. In 1994, he returned to the United States, and joined the Denver Nuggets. He retired from the league in 1995, with career totals of 5,888 points, 4,307 rebounds, and 593 blocked shots.

== Coaching career ==
In 2000, Levingston began his coaching career as an assistant basketball coach with the Fort Wayne Fury of the CBA. In 2001, he served as an assistant coach with the Dodge City Legend of the USBL. In 2002, he returned to Dodge City, to serve his first stint as a professional league head coach; that year the Legends won the USBL title, and Levingston was named the USBL Coach of the Year.

From 2003 to 2004, Levingston served as an assistant coach for the Harlem Globetrotters. In 2004, he coached the St. Louis Flight of the ABA.

In 2005, Levingston was hired as an assistant coach of the Gary Steelheads of the CBA; that year, the Steelheads played their best season in franchise history, though they lost the championship game. In 2006, he briefly served as an assistant coach for the Kansas Cagerz, and in November, he was officially hired by the Gary Steelheads (of the USBL), as head coach for the 2007 season.

In the fall of 2007, Micheal Ray Richardson was fired by the Oklahoma Cavalry of the CBA. Levingston was hired to replace him.

In the fall of 2011, Levingston became an assistant coach for Michigan City Marquette High School, in northern Indiana.

In 2012, Levingston was named the 2nd head coach of the Rochester Razorsharks of the Premier Basketball League. He coached the Sharks for one season.

In 2020, Levingston was named the 1st head coach of the Kokomo BobKats of the TBL.

== Personal life ==
In 2003, Levingston was sentenced to four months in prison, for failure to pay child support.

Levingston is a cousin of NBA player Cory Carr. He is also a cousin of retired MLB player Mark McLemore, and the late Harlem Globetrotter Kelvin Hildreth.

He is a San Diego native.

== Career statistics ==
Legend
GP	Games played	GS	Games started	MPG	Minutes per game
FG%	Field goal percentage	3P%	3-point field goal percentage	FT%	Free throw percentage
RPG	Rebounds per game	APG	Assists per game	SPG	Steals per game
BPG	Blocks per game	PPG	Points per game	**Bold**	Career high
†	Won an NBA championship	*	Led the league

=== NBA ===
==== Regular season ====
Year	Team	GP	GS	MPG	FG%	3P%	FT%	RPG	APG	SPG	BPG	PPG
1982–83	Detroit	62	5	14.2	.485	.000	.571	3.7	.8	.4	.6	5.6
1983–84	Detroit	80	24	21.8	.525	.000	.672	6.8	**1.4**	.6	**1.0**	7.3
1984–85	Atlanta	74	**53**	**27.3**	.527	.000	.653	**7.6**	**1.4**	.9	.9	9.8
1985–86	Atlanta	81	35	24.0	.534	.000	.678	6.6	.9	.9	.5	9.3
1986–87	Atlanta	**82***	10	22.5	.506	.000	.731	6.5	.5	.6	.8	8.0
1987–88	Atlanta	**82**	32	26.0	**.557**	**.500**	**.772**	6.1	.9	.6	**1.0**	**10.0**
1988–89	Atlanta	80	52	**27.3**	.528	.200	.696	6.2	.9	**1.2**	.9	9.2
1989–90	Atlanta	75	5	22.7	.509	.200	.680	4.3	1.1	.7	.5	6.9
1990–91†	Chicago	78	0	13.0	.450	.250	.648	2.9	.7	.4	.6	4.0
1991–92†	Chicago	79	0	12.9	.498	.167	.625	2.9	.8	.3	.6	3.9
1994–95	Denver	57	0	8.2	.423	.000	.422	2.2	.5	.2	.4	2.3
Career		830	216	20.4	.516	.152	.676	5.2	.9	.6	.7	7.1

==== Playoffs ====
Year	Team	GP	GS	MPG	FG%	3P%	FT%	RPG	APG	SPG	BPG	PPG
1984	Detroit	5		**20.2**	**.789**	–	.625	**4.8**	.2	.2	.4	**8.0**
1986	Atlanta	9	0	20.0	.595	**1.000**	.778	4.6	.3	.4	**1.0**	5.8
1987	Atlanta	9	0	12.0	.389	.000	.778	3.8	.3	.0	.3	3.1
1988	Atlanta	12	0	13.6	.480	–	.750	2.2	**.6**	.4	.4	5.0
1989	Atlanta	5	0	15.4	.273	**1.000**	**.900**	3.4	.4	.0	.6	3.2
1991†	Chicago	17	0	11.3	.512	–	.500	2.4	.4	.6	.4	2.6
1992†	Chicago	**22***	0	8.7	.439	.000	.500	1.9	.4	.2	.3	2.9
1995	Denver	3	0	11.7	.500	–	.500	3.0	.3	**1.0**	.7	2.3
Career		82	0	12.8	.502	.500	.667	2.8	.4	.3	.5	3.8
