= Steve Holman =

Steve Holman may refer to:

- Steve Holman (athlete) (born 1970), American middle-distance runner
- Steve Holman (broadcaster) (born 1954), American sports radio broadcaster
