= 1987–88 Atlanta Hawks season =

NBA professional basketball team season

- Head coach: Mike Fratello
- General manager: Stan Kasten
- Owners: Ted Turner / Turner Broadcasting System
- Arena: The Omni

Results
- Record: 50–32 (.610)
- Place: Division: 3rd (Central); Conference: 4th (Eastern)
- Playoff finish: Conference Semi-finals (lost to Celtics 3–4)
- Stats at Basketball Reference

Local media
- Television: WGNX (John Sterling, Butch Beard)
- Radio: WGST (John Sterling, Steve Holman)

The 1987–88 Atlanta Hawks season was the 39th season for the Atlanta Hawks in the National Basketball Association, and their 20th season in Atlanta, Georgia.

== Season summary ==
=== Regular season ===
In December, the Hawks traded Mike McGee to the Sacramento Kings, and acquired second-year center Chris Washburn from the Golden State Warriors. The Hawks got off to a 6–5 start to the regular season, then won 16 of their next 18 games, while posting a 13–2 record in December, and later on held a 30–15 record at the All-Star break. The team posted a seven-game winning streak between March and April, but then lost six of their final nine games of the season. The Hawks finished in third place in the Central Division with a 50–32 record, and earned the fourth seed in the Eastern Conference.

Dominique Wilkins averaged 30.7 points, 6.4 rebounds and 1.3 steals per game, and was named to the All-NBA Second Team, while Doc Rivers averaged 14.2 points, 9.3 assists and 1.8 steals per game. In addition, Kevin Willis provided the team with 11.6 points and 7.3 rebounds per game, while Randy Wittman contributed 10.0 points and 3.7 assists per game, Cliff Levingston provided with 10.0 points and 6.1 rebounds per game, and Tree Rollins averaged 4.4 points, 6.0 rebounds and led the team with 1.7 blocks per game. Off the bench, John Battle contributed 10.6 points per game, while Antoine Carr averaged 8.8 points and 3.6 rebounds per game, and Spud Webb provided with 6.0 points and 4.1 assists per game.

During the NBA All-Star weekend at the Chicago Stadium in Chicago, Illinois, Wilkins and Rivers were both selected for the 1988 NBA All-Star Game, as members of the Eastern Conference All-Star team, while head coach Mike Fratello was selected to coach the Eastern Conference; it was Rivers' first and only All-Star appearance. Wilkins scored 29 points as the Eastern Conference defeated the Western Conference, 138–133. In addition, Wilkins and Webb both participated in the NBA Slam Dunk Contest. Wilkins also finished in sixth place in Most Valuable Player voting, while Battle finished tied in eighth place in Most Improved Player voting.

The Hawks finished eighth in the NBA in home-game attendance, with an attendance of 572,460 at the Omni Coliseum during the regular season; as of 2026, this would be the final season in which the Hawks finished in the top ten in home-game attendance.

=== NBA playoffs ===
In the Eastern Conference First Round of the 1988 NBA playoffs, the Hawks faced off against the 5th–seeded Milwaukee Bucks, a team that featured Terry Cummings, Jack Sikma, and sixth man Ricky Pierce. The Hawks won the first two games over the Bucks at home at the Omni Coliseum, and took a 2–0 series lead. However, the team lost the next two games on the road, which included a Game 4 loss to the Bucks at the MECCA Arena, 105–99. With the series tied at 2–2, the Hawks won Game 5 over the Bucks at the Omni Coliseum, 121–111 to win in a hard-fought five-game series.

In the Eastern Conference Semi-finals, the Hawks faced off against the top-seeded, and Atlantic Division champion Boston Celtics, who were led by the All-Star quartet of Larry Bird, Kevin McHale, Robert Parish and Danny Ainge. The Hawks lost the first two games to the Celtics on the road at the Boston Garden, but then managed to win the next three games, including a Game 5 road win over the Celtics at the Boston Garden, 112–104 to take a 3–2 series lead. However, the Hawks lost Game 6 at the Omni Coliseum, 102–100, and then lost Game 7 to the Celtics at the Boston Garden, 118–116, despite a 47-point performance from Wilkins, thus losing in a hard-fought seven-game series; this was the closest Wilkins had ever gotten to advancing to the Eastern Conference Finals.

=== Aftermath ===
Following the season, Wittman was traded to the Sacramento Kings, while Rollins signed as a free agent with the Cleveland Cavaliers, and Washburn was released to free agency.

== Draft picks ==
Round	Pick	Player	Position	Nationality	College
1	21	Dallas Comegys	PF	United States	DePaul
2	42	Terrance Bailey		United States	Wagner
2	44	Terry Coner		United States	Alabama
3	67	Song Tao		China	
4	90	Theofanis Christodoulou		Greece	
5	113	Jose Antonio Montero		Spain	
6	136	Riccardo Morandotti		Italy	
7	159	Franjo Arapovic		Croatia	

== Roster ==
1987–88 Atlanta Hawks roster
Players

Pos.	No.	Player	Height	Weight	DOB	From
G	12	John Battle	6 ft 2 in (1.88 m)	175 lb (79 kg)	1962–11–09	Rutgers
F	35	Antoine Carr	6 ft 9 in (2.06 m)	225 lb (102 kg)	1961–07–23	Wichita State
F	44	Scott Hastings	6 ft 10 in (2.08 m)	235 lb (107 kg)	1960–06–03	Arkansas
C	32	Jon Koncak	7 ft 0 in (2.13 m)	250 lb (113 kg)	1963–05–17	SMU
F	53	Cliff Levingston	6 ft 8 in (2.03 m)	210 lb (95 kg)	1961–01–04	Wichita State
G	25	Doc Rivers	6 ft 4 in (1.93 m)	185 lb (84 kg)	1961–10–13	Marquette
C	30	Tree Rollins	7 ft 1 in (2.16 m)	235 lb (107 kg)	1955–06–16	Clemson
C	50	Chris Washburn	6 ft 11 in (2.11 m)	225 lb (102 kg)	1965–05–13	NC State
G	4	Spud Webb	5 ft 6 in (1.68 m)	133 lb (60 kg)	1963–07–13	NC State
F	21	Dominique Wilkins	6 ft 7 in (2.01 m)	200 lb (91 kg)	1960–01–12	Georgia
F	42	Kevin Willis	7 ft 0 in (2.13 m)	220 lb (100 kg)	1962–09–06	Michigan State
G	10	Randy Wittman	6 ft 6 in (1.98 m)	210 lb (95 kg)	1959–10–28	Indiana
G	1	Leon Wood	6 ft 3 in (1.91 m)	185 lb (84 kg)	1962–03–25	Cal State Fullerton

Coaches
Head coach
- Mike Fratello
Assistant(s)
- Don Chaney
- Brian Hill
- Brendan Suhr

Legend
- (DP) Unsigned draft pick
- (FA) Free agent
- (S) Suspended
- Injured

Roster
Updated: March 25, 1988

== Regular season ==
=== Season standings ===
Central Division	W	L	PCT	GB	Home	Road	Div
y-Detroit Pistons	54	28	.659	–	34–7	20–21	20–10
x-Chicago Bulls	50	32	.610	4	30–11	20–21	16–13
x-Atlanta Hawks	50	32	.610	4	30-11	20-21	16–13
x-Milwaukee Bucks	42	40	.512	12	30–11	12–29	13–17
x-Cleveland Cavaliers	42	40	.512	12	31–10	11–30	11–19
Indiana Pacers	38	44	.463	16	25–16	13–28	13–17

#	Eastern Conference				
#	Team	W	L	PCT	GB
1	c-Boston Celtics	57	25	.695	–
2	y-Detroit Pistons	54	28	.659	3
3	x-Chicago Bulls	50	32	.610	7
4	x-Atlanta Hawks	50	32	.610	7
5	x-Milwaukee Bucks	42	40	.512	15
6	x-Cleveland Cavaliers	42	40	.512	15
7	x-Washington Bullets	38	44	.463	19
8	x-New York Knicks	38	44	.463	19
9	Indiana Pacers	38	44	.463	19
10	Philadelphia 76ers	36	46	.439	21
11	New Jersey Nets	19	63	.232	38

z - clinched division title
y - clinched division title
x - clinched playoff spot

=== Record vs. opponents ===
==== vs. Eastern Conference ====
vs. Atlantic Division

1987–88 NBA records
Team	BOS	NJN	NYK	PHI	WSB	Total
Atlanta	2–4	5–0	3–3	6–0	3–3	19–10
Chicago	3–3	5–1	3–2	4–2	3–3	18–11
Cleveland	3–2	5–1	2–4	3–2	6–0	19–9
Detroit	3–3	5–1	4–2	4–1	3–2	19–9
Indiana	0–5	6–0	2–3	2–4	2–4	12–16
Milwaukee	3–3	3–2	3–3	2–4	4–1	15–13

vs. Central Division

1987–88 NBA records
Team	ATL	CHI	CLE	DET	IND	MIL	Total
Atlanta	—	2–3	5–1	2–4	3–3	4–2	16–13
Chicago	3–2	—	3–3	2–4	3–3	5–1	16–13
Cleveland	1–5	3–3	—	1–5	4–2	2–4	11–19
Detroit	4–2	4–2	5–1	—	3–3	4–2	20–10
Indiana	2–4	3–3	2–4	3–3	—	3–3	13–17
Milwaukee	3–3	1–5	4–2	2–4	3–3	—	13–17

==== vs. Western Conference ====
vs. Midwest Division

1987–88 NBA records
Team	DAL	DEN	HOU	SAC	SAS	UTA	Total
Atlanta	2–0	1–1	1–1	1–1	2–0	1–1	8–4
Chicago	0–2	1–1	2–0	1–1	1–1	2–0	7–5
Cleveland	1–1	1–1	1–1	2–0	2–0	0–2	7–5
Detroit	1–1	1–1	1–1	2–0	1–1	2–0	8–4
Indiana	0–2	1–1	0–2	2–0	2–0	1–1	6–6
Milwaukee	0–2	1–1	0–2	2–0	1–1	1–1	5–7

vs. Pacific Division

1987–88 NBA records
Team	GSW	LAC	LAL	PHO	POR	SEA	Total
Atlanta	2–0	2–0	0–2	1–1	0–2	2–0	7–5
Chicago	2–0	2–0	1–1	2–0	1–1	1–1	9–3
Cleveland	0–2	1–1	1–1	1–1	1–1	1–1	5–7
Detroit	2–0	1–1	0–2	2–0	1–1	1–1	7–5
Indiana	2–0	1–1	1–1	2–0	0–2	1–1	7–5
Milwaukee	2–0	2–0	2–0	1–1	1–1	1–1	9–3

=== Game log ===
1987–88 game log
Total: 50–32 (home: 30–11; road: 20–21)
November: 7–5 (home: 6–1; road: 1–4)

Game	Date	Team	Score	High points	High rebounds	High assists	Location Attendance	Record
1	November 6, 1987; 7:30 p.m. EST	Washington	W 114–97	Wilkins (34)	Wilkins (14)	Webb (10)	The Omni; 16,064	1–0
2	November 7, 1987; 7:30 p.m. EST	Cleveland	W 113–105	Rivers (23)	Willis (11)	Rivers (9)	The Omni; 11,455	2–0
3	November 10, 1987; 8:00 p.m. EST	Chicago	L 95–105	Wilkins (35)	Koncak (10)	Webb (10)	The Omni; 16,451	2–1
5	November 15, 1987; 8:30 p.m. EST	@ Milwaukee	L 103–112	Willis (21)	Willis (10)	Rivers, Wilkins (5)	MECCA Arena; 11,052	4–2
8	November 20, 1987; 8:30 p.m. EST	@ Chicago	L 92–94	Wilkins (36)	Koncak (15)	Rivers (9)	Chicago Stadium; 18,423	5–3
10	November 25, 1987; 7:30 p.m. EST	@ Boston	L 102–117	Wilkins (22)	Willis (14)	Rivers (9)	Boston Garden; 14,890	6–4

December: 13–2 (home: 5–0; road: 8–2)

Game	Date	Team	Score	High points	High rebounds	High assists	Location Attendance	Record
13	December 1, 1987; 7:30 p.m. EST	Boston	W 120–106	Wilkins (22)	Carr, Rollins (10)	Webb (9)	The Omni; 16,451	8–5
14	December 3, 1987; 7:30 p.m. EST	@ Washington	W 102–94	Willis (23)	Rollins (16)	Levingston (6)	Capital Centre; 6,464	9–5
21	December 18, 1987; 9:00 p.m. EST	@ Milwaukee	W 94–87	Wilkins (23)	Koncak (11)	Webb (8)	MECCA Arena; 11,052	15–6
22	December 19, 1987; 7:30 p.m. EST	Utah	W 130–124 (OT)	Wilkins (46)	Rollins (12)	Battle (6)	The Omni; 12,215	16–6
26	December 29, 1987; 8:30 p.m. EST	@ Chicago	W 108–98	Rivers (29)	Rivers (14)	Rivers (12)	Chicago Stadium; 18,676	19–7
27	December 30, 1987; 7:30 p.m. EST	@ Cleveland	W 117–110	Wilkins (33)	Koncak (8)	Rivers (14)	Richfield Coliseum; 19,029	20–7

January: 9–7 (home: 6–1; road: 3–6)

Game	Date	Team	Score	High points	High rebounds	High assists	Location Attendance	Record
29	January 5, 1988; 8:00 p.m. EST	Detroit	W 81–71	Levingston (15)	Levingston (14)	Rivers (7)	The Omni; 16,451	22–7
30	January 6, 1988; 7:30 p.m. EST	@ Detroit	L 87–90	Rivers (22)	Rollins (7)	Rivers (6)	Pontiac Silverdome; 25,749	22–8
31	January 8, 1988; 7:30 p.m. EST	Cleveland	W 101–97	Wilkins (34)	Levingston (11)	Wilkins (8)	The Omni; 11,408	23–8
32	January 9, 1988; 7:30 p.m. EST	Denver	W 113–105	Wilkins (33)	Koncak (12)	Rivers (11)	The Omni; 14,986	24–8
34	January 14, 1988; 9:30 p.m. EST	@ Denver	L 112–115	Wilkins (34)	Levingston (10)	Rivers (8)	McNichols Sports Arena; 14,944	25–9
35	January 16, 1988; 1:30 p.m. EST	@ Dallas	W 101–98	Wilkins (34)	Wilkins (14)	Rivers (13)	Reunion Arena; 17,007	26–9
37	January 19, 1988; 8:00 p.m. EST	Chicago	W 106–94	Wilkins (41)	Levingston (13)	Wittman (12)	The Omni; 16,451	27–10
38	January 21, 1988; 7:30 p.m. EST	@ Cleveland	W 101–93	Wilkins (28)	Rollins (8)	Rivers (12)	Richfield Coliseum; 10,129	28–10
39	January 22, 1988; 8:00 p.m. EST	@ Boston	L 106–124	Wilkins (23)	Koncak, Rivers (9)	Battle (6)	Boston Garden; 14,890	28–11
41	January 26, 1988; 7:30 p.m. EST	Boston	L 97–102	Wilkins (38)	Willis (15)	Rivers (12)	The Omni; 16,451	29–12
42	January 29, 1988; 10:30 p.m. EST	@ L.A. Lakers	L 107–117	Rivers (27)	Willis (12)	Rivers (9)	The Forum; 17,505	29–13
43	January 30, 1988; 9:30 p.m. EST	@ Utah	L 109–115	Wilkins (35)	Rollins (9)	Rivers (6)	Salt Palace; 12,212	29–14

February: 6–6 (home: 4–3; road: 2–3)

Game	Date	Team	Score	High points	High rebounds	High assists	Location Attendance	Record
All-Star Break
47	February 12, 1988; 8:00 p.m. EST	@ Detroit	L 92–108	Wilkins (31)	Rollins (11)	Rivers (8)	Pontiac Silverdome; 35,884	31–16
48	February 13, 1988; 7:30 p.m. EST	Washington	W 105–103	Wilkins (45)	Rollins (13)	Rivers (15)	The Omni; 16,451	32–16
49	February 15, 1988; 1:30 p.m. EST	@ Chicago	L 107–126	Wilkins (25)	Levingston (7)	Rivers (10)	Chicago Stadium; 17,704	32–17
51	February 19, 1988; 8:00 p.m. EST	L.A. Lakers	L 119–126 (OT)	Wilkins (38)	Levingston (16)	Rivers (15)	The Omni; 16,451	32–19

March: 8–6 (home: 6–2; road: 2–4)

Game	Date	Team	Score	High points	High rebounds	High assists	Location Attendance	Record
56	March 1, 1988; 7:30 p.m. EST	Detroit	L 104–117	Wilkins (50)	Rivers (8)	Rivers (8)	The Omni; 16,451	35–21
57	March 5, 1988; 7:30 p.m. EST	Milwaukee	L 101–104	Wilkins (24)	Willis (15)	Rivers (7)	The Omni; 16,451	35–22
60	March 13, 1988; 12 Noon EST	@ Boston	L 100–117	Wilkins (26)	Willis (12)	Webb (5)	Boston Garden; 14,890	37–23
64	March 21, 1988; 7:30 p.m. EST	Milwaukee	W 115–105	Wilkins (35)	Rollins (9)	Rivers (11)	The Omni; 13,702	40–24
65	March 22, 1988; 8:30 p.m. EST	@ Milwaukee	L 98–111	Wilkins (25)	Willis (8)	Wittman (6)	MECCA Arena; 11,052	40–25
66	March 24, 1988; 7:30 p.m. EST	@ Washington	L 91–94	Wilkins (28)	Levingston (7)	Rivers (6)	Capital Centre; 13,629	40–26
67	March 26, 1988; 7:30 p.m. EST	Cleveland	W 109–102	Wilkins (37)	Willis (10)	Rivers (9)	The Omni; 16,418	41–26
68	March 29, 1988; 8:00 p.m. EST	Dallas	W 120–106	Wilkins (40)	Willis (8)	Rivers (17)	The Omni; 14,583	42–26
69	March 30, 1988; 7:30 p.m. EST	@ Detroit	W 103–102	Wittman (20)	Rivers, Rollins (10)	Rivers, Wittman (6)	Pontiac Silverdome; 47,692	43–26

April: 7–6 (home: 3–4; road: 4–2)

Game	Date	Team	Score	High points	High rebounds	High assists	Location Attendance	Record
72	April 5, 1988; 7:30 p.m. EDT	Milwaukee	W 121–110	Wilkins (39)	Wilkins (11)	Rivers (16)	The Omni; 15,442	46–26
74	April 9, 1988; 7:30 p.m. EDT	Detroit	L 102–115	Wilkins (36)	Wilkins (9)	Rivers (12)	The Omni; 16,451	47–27
75	April 11, 1988; 7:30 p.m. EDT	Washington	L 85–86	Wilkins (17)	Willis (18)	Battle, Webb (5)	The Omni; 10,473	47–28
76	April 12, 1988; 7:30 p.m. EDT	@ Cleveland	L 103–116	Wilkins (28)	Levingston, Willis (5)	Rivers (7)	Richfield Coliseum; 12,418	47–29
81	April 22, 1988; 7:30 p.m. EDT	Boston	W 133–106	Wilkins (35)	Willis (8)	Rivers (10)	The Omni; 16,451	50–31
82	April 23, 1988; 7:30 p.m. EDT	@ Washington	L 96–106	Wilkins (19)	Willis (9)	Rivers (6)	Capital Centre; 15,638	50–32

1987–88 schedule

== Playoffs ==
1988 playoff game log
Eastern Conference First Round: 3–2 (home: 3–0; road: 0–2)

Game	Date	Team	Score	High points	High rebounds	High assists	Location Attendance	Series
1	April 29, 1988; 7:30 p.m. EDT	Milwaukee	W 110–107	Wilkins (26)	Willis (9)	Rivers (6)	The Omni; 11,517	1–0
2	May 1, 1988; 7:00 p.m. EDT	Milwaukee	W 104–97	Wilkins (43)	Willis (10)	Rivers (8)	The Omni; 11,777	2–0
3	May 4, 1988; 8:30 p.m. EDT	@ Milwaukee	L 115–123	Wilkins (22)	Wilkins (14)	Wittman (8)	MECCA Arena; 11,052	2–1
4	May 6, 1988; 8:30 p.m. EDT	@ Milwaukee	L 99–105	Wilkins (31)	Willis (8)	Rivers (9)	MECCA Arena; 11,052	2–2
5	May 8, 1988; 7:00 p.m. EDT	Milwaukee	W 121–111	Wilkins (33)	Wilkins (10)	Rivers (15)	The Omni; 12,190	3–2

Eastern Conference Semifinals: 3–4 (home: 2–1; road: 1–3)

Game	Date	Team	Score	High points	High rebounds	High assists	Location Attendance	Series
1	May 11, 1988; 8:30 p.m. EDT	@ Boston	L 101–110	Wilkins (25)	Rivers (9)	Battle, Rivers, Webb (5)	Boston Garden; 14,890	0–1
2	May 13, 1988; 8:00 p.m. EDT	@ Boston	L 97–108	Wilkins (22)	Rollins (9)	Rivers (6)	Boston Garden; 14,890	0–2
3	May 15, 1988; 1:00 p.m. EDT	Boston	W 110–92	Wilkins (25)	Willis (13)	Webb (13)	The Omni; 16,451	1–2
4	May 16, 1988; 8:00 p.m. EDT	Boston	W 118–109	Wilkins (40)	Rollins (12)	Rivers (22)	The Omni; 16,451	2–2
5	May 18, 1988; 8:00 p.m. EDT	@ Boston	W 112–104	Willis (27)	Willis (14)	Rivers (7)	Boston Garden; 14,890	3–2
6	May 20, 1988; 1:00 p.m. EDT	Boston	L 100–102	Wilkins (35)	Rollins, Willis (11)	Webb (7)	The Omni; 16,451	3–3
7	May 22, 1988; 1:00 p.m. EDT	@ Boston	L 116–118	Wilkins (47)	Willis (11)	Rivers (18)	Boston Garden; 14,890	3–4

1988 schedule

== Player statistics ==
Legend
GP	Games played	GS	Games started	MPG	Minutes per game
FG%	Field-goal percentage	3P%	3-point field-goal percentage	FT%	Free-throw percentage
RPG	Rebounds per game	APG	Assists per game	SPG	Steals per game
BPG	Blocks per game	PPG	Points per game

=== Season ===
Player	GP	GS	MPG	FG%	3FG%	FT%	RPG	APG	SPG	BPG	PPG
Dominique Wilkins	78	76	37.8	46.4	29.5	82.6	6.4	2.9	1.3	0.6	30.7
Doc Rivers	80	80	31.3	45.3	27.3	75.8	4.6	9.3	1.8	0.5	14.2
Kevin Willis	75	55	27.9	51.8	0.0	64.9	7.3	0.4	0.9	0.5	11.6
John Battle	67	1	18.3	45.4	39.0	75.0	1.7	2.4	0.5	0.1	10.6
Randy Wittman	82	82	29.4	47.8	0.0	79.8	2.1	3.7	0.6	0.2	10.0
Cliff Levingston	82	32	26.0	55.7	50.0	77.2	6.1	0.9	0.6	1.0	10.0
Antoine Carr	80	2	18.5	54.4	25.0	78.0	3.6	1.3	0.5	1.0	8.8
Spud Webb	82	1	16.4	47.5	5.3	81.7	1.8	4.1	0.8	0.1	6.0
Jon Koncak	49	22	21.9	48.3	0.0	61.0	6.8	0.4	0.7	1.1	5.7
Mike McGee	11	0	10.6	42.3	26.3	33.3	1.5	1.2	0.5	0.0	4.6
Tree Rollins	76	59	23.2	51.2	0.0	87.5	6.0	0.3	0.4	1.7	4.4
Leon Wood	14	0	5.6	53.3	47.4	87.5	0.4	1.4	0.3	0.0	3.4
Ennis Whatley	5	0	4.8	44.4	0.0	75.0	0.8	0.4	0.4	0.0	2.2
Scott Hastings	55	0	7.3	48.8	41.7	92.6	1.8	0.3	0.1	0.2	2.0
Chris Washburn	29	0	6.0	44.9	0.0	56.5	1.9	0.1	0.1	0.3	2.0

=== Playoffs ===
Player	GP	GS	MPG	FG%	3FG%	FT%	RPG	APG	SPG	BPG	PPG
Dominique Wilkins	12	12	39.4	45.7	22.2	76.8	6.4	2.8	1.3	0.5	31.2
Kevin Willis	12	12	38.5	58.0	0.0	68.0	9.0	0.9	0.8	0.8	16.2
Doc Rivers	12	12	34.1	51.1	31.8	90.7	4.9	9.6	2.1	0.2	15.7
Randy Wittman	12	12	28.7	54.1	0.0	71.4	2.2	3.6	0.6	0.1	11.4
Spud Webb	12	0	17.6	43.2	25.0	91.9	1.7	4.7	0.8	0.0	8.8
Antoine Carr	12	0	17.5	52.9	0.0	64.3	3.4	1.3	0.3	1.4	6.8
John Battle	12	0	13.8	47.8	0.0	68.0	1.7	2.2	0.2	0.0	6.8
Cliff Levingston	12	0	13.6	48.0	0.0	75.0	2.2	0.6	0.4	0.4	5.0
Tree Rollins	12	12	27.8	55.6	0.0	86.7	5.9	0.5	0.8	1.6	4.4
Scott Hastings	11	0	9.4	64.3	0.0	100.0	1.5	0.3	0.3	0.1	2.4
Leon Wood	4	0	1.0	100.0	100.0	0.0	0.0	0.3	0.0	0.0	0.8
Chris Washburn	1	0	2.0	0.0	0.0	0.0	0.0	0.0	0.0	0.0	0.0

Player statistics citation:

== Awards and records ==
- Dominique Wilkins, All-NBA Second Team

== See also ==
- 1987-88 NBA season
