= Sedric Toney =

American basketball player (born 1962)

Personal information
- Born: April 13, 1962 (age 64) Columbus, Mississippi, U.S.
- Listed height: 6 ft 2 in (1.88 m)
- Listed weight: 178 lb (81 kg)

Career information
- High school: Wilbur Wright (Dayton, Ohio)
- College: Western Nebraska CC (1981–1983); Dayton (1983–1985)
- NBA draft: 1985: 3rd round, 59th overall pick
- Drafted by: Atlanta Hawks
- Playing career: 1985–1994
- Position: Point guard
- Number: 12, 15, 11, 4

Career history
- 1985: Atlanta Hawks
- 1986: Phoenix Suns
- 1988: New York Knicks
- 1989: Indiana Pacers
- 1989–1990: Atlanta Hawks
- 1990: Sacramento Kings
- 1992–1993: Columbus Horizon
- 1993–1994: Cleveland Cavaliers
- Stats at NBA.com
- Stats at Basketball Reference

Sedric Andre Toney (born April 13, 1962) is an American former National Basketball Association (NBA) player. He was selected by the Atlanta Hawks with the 59th overall pick (third round) of the 1985 NBA draft.

Born in Columbus, Mississippi, he played in five NBA seasons for six teams: Atlanta Hawks, Phoenix Suns, New York Knicks, Indiana Pacers, Sacramento Kings, and Cleveland Cavaliers.

Toney also played college basketball at Phillips BC and Western Nebraska Community College for one season each and the University of Dayton for two more seasons.

He currently works for ESPN as a color commentator for college basketball games.

== Career statistics ==
Legend
GP	Games played	GS	Games started	MPG	Minutes per game
FG%	Field goal percentage	3P%	3-point field goal percentage	FT%	Free throw percentage
RPG	Rebounds per game	APG	Assists per game	SPG	Steals per game
BPG	Blocks per game	PPG	Points per game	**Bold**	Career high

=== NBA ===
==== Regular season ====
Year	Team	GP	GS	MPG	FG%	3P%	FT%	RPG	APG	SPG	BPG	PPG
1985–86	Atlanta	3	0	8.0	.286	–	**1.000**	.7	.0	.3	.0	1.7
1985–86	Phoenix	10	0	20.6	**.441**	.300	.667	**2.3**	2.6	.5	.0	**7.5**
1987–88	New York	21	0	6.6	.438	.357	.909	.4	1.1	.4	.0	2.7
1988–89	Indiana	2	0	4.5	.200	.000	.000	1.0	.0	.0	.0	1.0
1989–90	Atlanta	**32**	0	8.9	.417	**.538**	.840	.4	1.6	.3	.0	2.8
1989–90	Sacramento	**32**	**9**	**21.3**	.320	.320	.793	1.4	**3.8**	**.7**	.0	5.5
1993–94	Cleveland	12	0	5.3	.167	.000	**1.000**	.3	.9	.0	.0	.5
Career		112	9	12.6	.365	.341	.781	.9	2.1	.4	.0	3.7

==== Playoffs ====
Year	Team	GP	GS	MPG	FG%	3P%	FT%	RPG	APG	SPG	BPG	PPG
1988	New York	3	0	5.0	.500	.500	1.000	.0	.7	.3	0	3.7
