= John Battle (basketball) =

American basketball player (born 1962)

Personal information
- Born: November 9, 1962 (age 64) Washington, D.C., U.S.
- Listed height: 6 ft 2 in (1.88 m)
- Listed weight: 175 lb (79 kg)

Career information
- High school: McKinley (Washington, D.C.)
- College: Rutgers (1981–1985)
- NBA draft: 1985: 4th round, 84th overall pick
- Drafted by: Atlanta Hawks
- Playing career: 1985–1995
- Position: Shooting guard
- Number: 12, 10

Career history
- 1985–1991: Atlanta Hawks
- 1991–1995: Cleveland Cavaliers

Career highlights
- 2× First-team All-Atlantic 10 (1984, 1985)

Career NBA statistics
- Points: 5,338 (8.7 ppg)
- Rebounds: 824 (1.3 rpg)
- Assists: 1,257 (2.1 apg)
- Stats at NBA.com
- Stats at Basketball Reference

John Sidney Battle (born November 9, 1962) is an American former professional basketball player and pastor. A 6-foot-2-inch (1.88 m) guard from Rutgers University, Battle was selected in the fourth round of the 1985 NBA draft by the Atlanta Hawks. He ended his career with 5,338 points. Battle had three nicknames: "J.B.," "Cricket," and "Pickle." Battle is married to R&B singer/recording artist Regina Belle.

== NBA career statistics ==
Legend
GP	Games played	GS	Games started	MPG	Minutes per game
FG%	Field goal percentage	3P%	3-point field goal percentage	FT%	Free throw percentage
RPG	Rebounds per game	APG	Assists per game	SPG	Steals per game
BPG	Blocks per game	PPG	Points per game	**Bold**	Career high

=== Regular season ===
Year	Team	GP	GS	MPG	FG%	3P%	FT%	RPG	APG	SPG	BPG	PPG
1985–86	Atlanta	64	0	10.0	.455	.000	.728	1.0	1.2	0.4	0.0	4.3
1986–87	Atlanta	64	8	12.6	.457	.000	.738	0.9	1.9	0.5	**0.1**	6.0
1987–88	Atlanta	67	1	18.3	.454	**.390**	.750	1.7	2.4	0.5	**0.1**	10.6
1988–89	Atlanta	**82**	0	20.4	.457	.324	.815	1.7	2.4	0.5	**0.1**	9.5
1989–90	Atlanta	60	**48**	**24.6**	**.506**	.154	.756	1.7	2.6	0.5	**0.1**	10.9
1990–91	Atlanta	79	2	23.6	.461	.286	**.854**	**2.0**	**2.7**	**0.6**	**0.1**	**13.6**
1991–92	Cleveland	76	2	21.5	.480	.118	.848	1.5	2.1	0.5	**0.1**	10.3
1992–93	Cleveland	41	0	12.1	.415	.167	.778	0.7	1.3	0.2	**0.1**	5.4
1993–94	Cleveland	51	1	16.0	.476	.263	.753	0.8	1.6	0.4	0.0	6.6
1994–95	Cleveland	28	0	10.0	.377	.355	.731	0.4	1.3	0.3	0.0	4.1
Career		612	62	17.8	.464	.273	.793	1.3	2.1	0.4	0.1	8.7

=== Playoffs ===
Year	Team	GP	GS	MPG	FG%	3P%	FT%	RPG	APG	SPG	BPG	PPG
1986	Atlanta	6	0	4.5	.364	.000	.750	0.7	0.3	0.3	0.0	1.8
1987	Atlanta	8	0	9.8	.441	**.400**	.913	1.3	1.0	0.1	0.0	6.6
1988	Atlanta	12	0	13.8	.478	.000	.680	1.7	2.2	0.2	0.0	6.8
1989	Atlanta	5	0	**23.6**	.435	.000	.750	**2.6**	**3.2**	**0.4**	0.0	9.8
1991	Atlanta	5	0	21.4	.364	**.400**	**.960**	2.0	2.2	0.2	0.0	**11.6**
1992	Cleveland	**15**	0	13.5	.415	.000	.913	0.8	1.0	0.3	**0.1**	5.9
1993	Cleveland	1	0	6.0	.000	–	–	1.0	1.0	0.0	0.0	0.0
1994	Cleveland	1	0	8.0	**1.000**	–	–	2.0	0.0	0.0	0.0	2.0
1995	Cleveland	2	0	3.5	.667	.000	–	0.0	0.5	0.0	0.0	2.0
Career		55	0	13.1	.429	.182	.848	1.3	1.5	0.2	0.0	6.3

== Personal life ==
In 1991, Battle married singer Regina Belle.
