= 1985–86 Atlanta Hawks season =

Season of National Basketball Association team the Atlanta Hawks

- Head coach: Mike Fratello
- General manager: Stan Kasten
- Owners: Ted Turner / Turner Broadcasting System
- Arena: The Omni

Results
- Record: 50–32 (.610)
- Place: Division: 2nd (Central); Conference: 4th (Eastern)
- Playoff finish: Conference semifinals (lost to Celtics 1–4)
- Stats at Basketball Reference

Local media
- Television: WVEU
- Radio: WSB

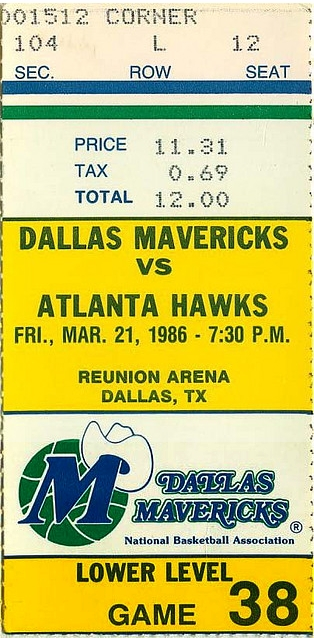
A ticket for a March 1986 game between the Atlanta Hawks and the Dallas Mavericks.

The 1985–86 Atlanta Hawks season was the franchise's thirty-seventh season in the National Basketball Association and the eighteenth in Atlanta, Georgia. The Hawks entered the season with rookies Jon Koncak and Spud Webb. The Hawks were transformed into one of the youngest teams in the NBA. The Hawks were led by "The Human Highlight Reel" Dominique Wilkins. He would have an outstanding year as he led the NBA in scoring with an average of 30.3 points per game. One of the highlights of the season came when Webb (measuring five feet, seven inches) won the NBA Slam Dunk contest during All-Star Weekend. In the second half of the season, the Hawks would be one of the strongest teams in the league. The club won 35 of their final 52 games to finish the season with a record of 50 wins and 32 losses. In the playoffs, the Hawks would eliminate the Detroit Pistons in 4 games. In the 2nd round, the Hawks would be defeated by the Boston Celtics in 5 games.

== Draft picks ==
Round	Pick	Player	Position	Nationality	College
1	5	Jon Koncak	C	United States	Southern Methodist
2	41	Lorenzo Charles	SF	United States	North Carolina State
3	59	Sedric Toney	PG	United States	Dayton
4	77	Arvydas Sabonis	C	Lithuania	
4	84	John Battle	PG	United States	Rutgers
5	100	Larry Hampton		United States	Hampton
6	123	Tony Duckett		United States	Lafayette
7	146	Bob Ferry	PF/C	United States	Harvard

== Roster ==
1985–86 Atlanta Hawks roster
Players

Pos.	No.	Player	Height	Weight	DOB	From
SG	12	John Battle	6 ft 2 in (1.88 m)	175 lb (79 kg)	1962-11-09	Rutgers
PF	33	Antoine Carr	6 ft 9 in (2.06 m)	225 lb (102 kg)	1961-07-23	Wichita State
SF	43	Lorenzo Charles	6 ft 7 in (2.01 m)	225 lb (102 kg)	1963-11-25	NC State
SG	16	Johnny Davis	6 ft 2 in (1.88 m)	170 lb (77 kg)	1955-10-21	Dayton
PF	44	Scott Hastings	6 ft 10 in (2.08 m)	235 lb (107 kg)	1960-06-03	Arkansas
SG	3	Eddie Johnson	6 ft 2 in (1.88 m)	180 lb (82 kg)	1955-02-24	Auburn
C	32	Jon Koncak	7 ft 0 in (2.13 m)	250 lb (113 kg)	1963-05-17	SMU
PF	53	Cliff Levingston	6 ft 8 in (2.03 m)	210 lb (95 kg)	1961-01-04	Wichita State
PG	25	Doc Rivers	6 ft 4 in (1.93 m)	185 lb (84 kg)	1961-10-13	Marquette
C	30	Tree Rollins	7 ft 1 in (2.16 m)	235 lb (107 kg)	1955-06-16	Clemson
PG	4	Spud Webb	5 ft 6 in (1.68 m)	133 lb (60 kg)	1963-07-13	NC State
SF	21	Dominique Wilkins	6 ft 7 in (2.01 m)	200 lb (91 kg)	1960-01-12	Georgia
PG	1	Ray Williams	6 ft 3 in (1.91 m)	188 lb (85 kg)	1954-10-14	Minnesota
PF	42	Kevin Willis	7 ft 0 in (2.13 m)	220 lb (100 kg)	1962-09-06	Michigan State
SG	10	Randy Wittman	6 ft 6 in (1.98 m)	210 lb (95 kg)	1959-10-28	Indiana

Coaches
Head coach
- Mike Fratello
Assistant(s)
- Willis Reed
- Ron Rothstein
- Brendan Suhr

Legend
- (DP) Unsigned draft pick
- (FA) Free agent
- (S) Suspended
- Injured

Roster
Updated: February 10, 1986

== Regular season ==
=== Season standings ===
Central Division	W	L	PCT	GB	Home	Road	Div
y-Milwaukee Bucks	57	25	.695	–	33–8	24–17	21–9
x-Atlanta Hawks	50	32	.610	7	34–7	16–25	21–9
x-Detroit Pistons	46	36	.561	11	31–10	15–26	18–12
x-Chicago Bulls	30	52	.366	27	22–19	8–33	10–20
Cleveland Cavaliers	29	53	.354	28	16–25	13–28	10–19
Indiana Pacers	26	56	.317	31	19–22	7–34	9–20

#	Eastern Conference				
#	Team	W	L	PCT	GB
1	z-Boston Celtics	67	15	.817	–
2	y-Milwaukee Bucks	57	25	.695	10
3	x-Philadelphia 76ers	54	28	.659	13
4	x-Atlanta Hawks	50	32	.610	17
5	x-Detroit Pistons	46	36	.561	21
6	x-Washington Bullets	39	43	.476	28
7	x-New Jersey Nets	39	43	.476	28
8	x-Chicago Bulls	30	52	.366	37
9	Cleveland Cavaliers	29	53	.354	38
10	Indiana Pacers	26	56	.317	41
11	New York Knicks	23	59	.280	44

z - clinched division title
y - clinched division title
x - clinched playoff spot

== Game log ==
=== Regular season ===
1985–86 game log
Total: 50–32 (home: 34–7; road: 16–25)
October: 1–2 (home: 1–1; road: 0–1)

Game	Date	Team	Score	High points	High rebounds	High assists	Location Attendance	Record
1	October 25, 1985; 7:30 p.m. EDT	Washington	L 91-100	Wilkins (32)	Rollins (9)	Webb (10)	The Omni; 10,129	0–1
2	October 26, 1985; 9:00 p.m. EDT	@ Milwaukee	L 91–117	Wilkins (18)	Levingston (9)	Williams (7)	MECCA Arena; 10,237	0–2
3	October 29	New York	W 102-87	Dominique Wilkins (22)	Dominique Wilkins (13)	Ray Williams (8)	Omni Coliseum; 9,901	1–2

November: 7–9 (home: 5–2; road: 2–7)

Game	Date	Team	Score	High points	High rebounds	High assists	Location Attendance	Record
4	November 1, 1985; 7:30 p.m. EST	@ Boston	L 105–109	Wilkins (40)	Wilkins (10)	Wittman (5)	Boston Garden; 14,890	1–3
5	November 2, 1985; 7:30 p.m. EST	Philadelphia	W 114–113 (OT)	Wilkins (28)	Levingston, Koncak (9)	Webb (11)	The Omni; 12,214	2–3
6	November 5, 1985; 9:30 p.m. EST	@ Denver	L 113–128	Koncak (21)	Kevin Willis (10)	Johnson (6)	McNichols Sports Arena; 8,691	2–4
7	November 6	@ Phoenix	W 114-106	Dominique Wilkins (34)	Dominique Wilkins (9)	Spud Webb (5)	Arizona Veterans Memorial Coliseum; 9,805	3–4
8	November 8	@ Golden State	L 119-130	Cliff Levingston (23)	Levingston, Jon Koncak, Kevin Willis (6)	Ray Williams, Eddie Johnson, Webb (5)	Oakland-Alameda County Coliseum Arena; 14,780	3–5
9	November 9	@ L.A. Clippers	W 97-94	Cliff Levingston (20)	Dominique Wilkins (14)	Eddie Johnson (8)	Los Angeles Memorial Sports Arena; 8,716	4–5
10	November 13	Phoenix	W 108-101	Cliff Levingston (23)	Cliff Levingston (11)	Eddie Johnson (10)	Omni Coliseum; 4,608	5–5
11	November 15, 1985; 7:30 p.m. EST	Detroit	W 122–118	Wilkins (30)	Levingston (10)]	Johnson, Wittman (6)	The Omni; 12,924	6–5
12	November 16	@ New York	L 96-103	Dominique Wilkins (19)	Tree Rollins (8)	Eddie Johnson (7)]	Madison Square Garden; 15,422	6–6
13	November 20	Chicago	W 116-101	Dominique Wilkins (28)	Cliff Levingston (17)	Eddie Johnson (7)	Omni Coliseum; 7,179	7–6
14	November 23, 1985; 7:30 p.m. EST	Utah	L 106–116	Wilkins (31)	Wilkins, Koncak, Rollins (7)	Johnson (8)	The Omni; 6,115	7–7
15	November 24	@ Cleveland	L 90-98	Cliff Levingston (17)	Cliff Levingston (11)	Randy Wittman (8)	Richfield Coliseum; 6,145	7–8
16	November 26	New York	W 104-94	Dominique Wilkins (35)	Dominique Wilkins (9)	Randy Wittman (5)	Omni Coliseum; 7,488	8–8
17	November 27, 1985; 8:30 p.m. EST	@ Milwaukee	L 96–114	Johnson (24)	Tree Rollins (8)	Johnson (8)	MECCA Arena; 10,879	8–9
18	November 29	@ New Jersey	L 97-107	Dominique Wilkins (30)	Dominique Wilkins (9)	Eddie Johnson (5)	Brenden Byrne Arena; 10,329	8–10
19	November 30, 1985; 7:30 p.m. EST	Boston	L 97–102	Wilkins (24)	Willis (12)	Battle (5)	The Omni; 13,101	8–11

December: 7–4 (home: 6–1; road: 1–3)

Game	Date	Team	Score	High points	High rebounds	High assists	Location Attendance	Record
20	December 4, 1985; 7:30 p.m. EST	Portland	W 109–98	Wilkins (31)	Rollins (12)	Rivers (10)	The Omni; 4,113	9–11
21	December 6, 1985; 7:30 p.m. EST	Milwaukee	W 94–93	Wilkins (29)	Wilkins (15)	Rivers (10)	The Omni; 5,562	10–11
22	December 10, 1985; 7:30 p.m. EST	@ Boston (at Hartford, CT)	L 110–114	Wilkins (32)	Wilkins (9)	Rivers (7)	Hartford Civic Center; 14,493	10–12
23	December 11	Seattle						
24	December 13	@ Indiana						
25	December 14, 1985; 7:30 p.m. EST	Philadelphia	W 107–103	Wilkins (29)	Wilkins, Willis (8)	Johnson (9)	The Omni; 4,638	12–13
26	December 17	New Jersey						
27	December 19, 1985; 7:30 p.m. EST	Dallas	L 108–120	Wilkins (29)	Levingston, Willis (10)	Rivers (10)	The Omni; 5,867	13–14
28	December 21, 1985; 7:30 p.m. EST	Houston	W 123–122	Wilkins (49)	Wilkins (11)	Rivers (10)	The Omni; 8,563	14–14
29	December 27, 1985; 7:30 p.m. EST	@ Washington	L 109–111	Wilkins (35)	Wilkins (14)	Rivers (5)	Capital Centre; 8,178	14–15
30	December 28	@ New York						

January: 11–4 (home: 9–1; road: 2–3)

Game	Date	Team	Score	High points	High rebounds	High assists	Location Attendance	Record
31	January 3, 1986; 7:30 p.m. EST	Detroit	W 111–101	Wilkins (32)	Willis (13)	Rivers (13)	The Omni; 15,817	16–15
32	January 4	@ Chicago						
33	January 7	L.A. Clippers						
34	January 9, 1986; 7:30 p.m. EST	@ Detroit	W 110–99	Rivers (29)	Wilkins, Willis (11)	Rivers (6)	Pontiac Silverdome; 9,400	19–15
35	January 10, 1986; 7:30 p.m. EST	@ Boston	L 108–115	Wilkins (34)	Willis (13)	Webb (6)	Boston Garden; 14,890	19–16
36	January 14	Sacramento						
37	January 16	Cleveland						
38	January 18, 1986; 7:30 p.m. EST	Boston	L 122–125 (OT)	Wilkins (36)	Koncak (10)	Johnson (9)	The Omni; 16,522	21–17
39	January 20, 1986; 7:30 p.m. EST	Milwaukee	W 101–98	Wilkins (33)	Willis (17)	Johnson (11)	The Omni; 9,467	22–17
40	January 22	Golden State						
41	January 24	New York						
42	January 25, 1986; 7:30 p.m. EST	@ Washington	L 103–111	Wilkins (35)	Willis (12)	Battle (5)	Capital Centre; 7,038	24–18
43	January 28	Indiana						
44	January 29, 1986; 7:30 p.m. EST	@ Detroit	L 94–107	Wilkins (30)	Willis (12)	Rivers (12)	Pontiac Silverdome; 12,386	25–19
45	January 31, 1986; 7:30 p.m. EST	Detroit	W 116–103	Wilkins (36)	Koncak, Willis (9)	Rivers (11)	The Omni; 12,624	26–19

February: 8–6 (home: 4–0; road: 4–6)

Game	Date	Team	Score	High points	High rebounds	High assists	Location Attendance	Record
46	February 1	@ New Jersey						
47	February 4	@ Cleveland						
48	February 6	@ Indiana						
All-Star Break
49	February 11, 1986; 8:30 p.m. EST	@ Houston	L 100–113	Levingston, Webb, Wilkins (13)	Koncak, Willis (9)	Battle (5)	The Summit; 16,016	28–21
50	February 13	@ Sacramento						
51	February 14, 1986; 10:30 p.m. EST	@ L.A. Lakers	L 117–141	Wilkins (29)	Wilkins (8)	Rivers (6)	The Forum; 17,505	29–22
52	February 16, 1986; 8:00 p.m. EST	@ Portland	W 110–101	Levingston (25)	Levingston, Willis (11)	Rivers (10)	Memorial Coliseum; 12,666	30–22
53	February 17	@ Seattle						
54	February 19, 1986; 9:30 p.m. EST	@ Utah	L 105–109	Wittman (23)	Levingston (9)	Rivers (7)	Salt Palace Acord Arena; 12,654	30–24
55	February 21	Indiana						
56	February 22	New Jersey						
57	February 24, 1986; 7:30 p.m. EST	L.A. Lakers	W 102–93	Wilkins (33)	Willis (18)	Webb (13)	The Omni; 16,522	33–24
58	February 26	Cleveland						
59	February 28, 1986; 7:30 p.m. EST	@ Detroit	L 103–115	Wilkins (35)	Levingston (14)	Rivers (8)	Pontiac Silverdome; 25,888	34–25

March: 12–5 (home: 5–2; road: 7–3)

Game	Date	Team	Score	High points	High rebounds	High assists	Location Attendance	Record
60	March 1	San Antonio						
61	March 4, 1986; 7:30 p.m. EST	Philadelphia	W 128–121	Wilkins (32)	Willis (9)	Rivers (21)	The Omni; 13,315	36–25
62	March 5, 1986; 7:30 p.m. EST	@ Philadelphia	W 122–114 (OT)	Wilkins (37)	Willis (12)	Wittman (9)	The Spectrum; 15,192	37–25
63	March 7	@ Chicago						
64	March 8, 1986; 7:30 p.m. EST	Milwaukee	W 111–109	Wilkins (29)	Willis (12)	Rivers (11)	The Omni; 15,822	39–25
65	March 11, 1986; 7:30 p.m. EST	Denver	W 128–116	Willis (39)	Willis (21)	Wittman (5)	The Omni; 8,905	40–25
66	March 12	@ New Jersey						
67	March 14, 1986; 7:30 p.m. EST	Boston	L 114–121	Wilkins (42)	Rollins (10)	Webb (9)	The Omni; 16,522	41–26
68	March 15	@ New York						
69	March 17	Chicago						
70	March 19	@ San Antonio						
71	March 21, 1986; 8:30 p.m. EST	@ Dallas	W 107–103	Wilkins (28)	Rollins (10)	Webb (10)	Reunion Arena; 17,007	44–27
72	March 22, 1986; 9:00 p.m. EST	@ Milwaukee	L 98–113	Wittman (18)	Levingston (9)	Davis (10)	MECCA Arena; 11,052	44–28
73	March 25	@ Cleveland						
74	March 26, 1986; 7:30 p.m. EST	@ Philadelphia	L 103–112	Wilkins (31)	Wilkins (7)	Rivers (8)	The Spectrum; 14,125	45–29
75	March 28	@ Indiana						
76	March 29	Cleveland						

April: 4–2 (home: 4–0; road: 0–2)

Game	Date	Team	Score	High points	High rebounds	High assists	Location Attendance	Record
77	April 1, 1986; 7:30 p.m. EST	Washington	W 107–91	Wilkins (33)	Willis (16)	Rivers (10)	The Omni; 6,835	47–30
78	April 4, 1986; 7:30 p.m. EST	@ Washington	L 129–135 (OT)	Wilkins (46)	Rollins (14)	Wittman (7)	Capital Centre; 9,113	47–31
79	April 5	@ Chicago						
80	April 8	Chicago						
81	April 10	New Jersey						
82	April 12	Indiana						

1985–86 schedule

=== Playoffs ===
1986 playoff game log
First Round: 3–1 (home: 2–0; road: 1–1)

Game	Date	Team	Score	High points	High rebounds	High assists	Location Attendance	Series
1	April 17, 1986; 8:00 p.m. EST	Detroit	W 140–122	Wilkins (28)	Rollins, Levingston (8)	Rivers (16)	The Omni; 12,538	1--0
2	April 19, 1986; 3:30 p.m. EST	Detroit	W 137–125	Wilkins (50)	Rollins (14)	Webb (18)	The Omni; 12,964	2–0
3	April 22, 1986; 8:00 p.m. EST	@ Detroit	L 97–106	Wilkins (21)	Wilkins, Levingston (7)	Rivers (8)	Pontiac Silverdome; 13,312	2–1
4	April 25, 1986; 8:00 p.m. EST	@ Detroit	W 114–113 (2OT)	Wilkins (38)	Rivers (13)	Rivers (9)	Pontiac Silverdome; 15,288	3–1

Conference semifinals: 1–4 (home: 1–1; road: 0–3)

Game	Date	Team	Score	High points	High rebounds	High assists	Location Attendance	Series
1	April 27, 1986; 1:00 p.m. EDT	@ Boston	L 91–103	Willis (18)	Willis (8)	Webb (5)	Boston Garden; 14,890	0–1
2	April 29, 1986; 8:30 p.m. EDT	@ Boston	L 108–119	Willis (23)	Willis, Rollins (10)	Rivers (7)	Boston Garden; 14,890	0–2
3	May 2, 1986; 7:30 p.m. EDT	Boston	L 107–111	Wilkins (38)	Willis (12)	Rivers (14)	The Omni; 12,357	0–3
4	May 4, 1986; 1:00 p.m. EDT	Boston	W 106–94	Wilkins (37)	Rollins (16)	Webb (12)	The Omni; 12,357	1–3
5	May 6, 1986; 7:30 p.m. EDT	@ Boston	L 99–132	Webb (15)	Rollins (8)	Webb (8)	Boston Garden; 14,890	1–4

1986 schedule

== Player statistics ==
Legend
GP	Games played	GS	Games started	MPG	Minutes per game
FG%	Field-goal percentage	3P%	3-point field-goal percentage	FT%	Free-throw percentage
RPG	Rebounds per game	APG	Assists per game	SPG	Steals per game
BPG	Blocks per game	PPG	Points per game

=== Season ===
Player	GP	GS	MPG	FG%	3FG%	FT%	RPG	APG	SPG	BPG	PPG
Dominique Wilkins	78	78	39.1	46.8	18.6	81.8	7.9	2.6	1.8	0.6	30.3
Randy Wittman	81	79	34.1	53.0	31.3	77.0	2.1	3.8	1.0	0.2	12.9
Kevin Willis	82	59	28.0	51.7	0.0	65.4	8.6	0.5	0.8	0.5	12.3
Doc Rivers	53	50	29.6	47.4	0.0	60.8	3.1	8.4	2.3	0.2	11.5
Eddie Johnson	39	5	22.1	47.3	25.0	71.8	1.9	5.6	0.3	0.0	10.1
Cliff Levingston	81	35	24.0	53.4	0.0	67.8	6.6	0.9	0.9	0.5	9.3
Ray Williams	19	13	19.3	39.9	36.4	85.4	2.4	3.5	1.5	0.1	8.4
Jon Koncak	82	15	20.7	50.7	0.0	60.7	5.7	0.7	0.5	0.8	8.3
Spud Webb	79	8	15.6	48.3	18.2	78.5	1.6	4.3	1.0	0.1	7.8
Antoine Carr	17	0	15.2	52.7	0.0	66.7	3.1	0.8	0.4	0.9	6.8
Tree Rollins	74	61	24.1	49.9	0.0	76.7	6.2	0.6	0.5	2.3	5.6
Johnny Davis	27	7	14.9	43.0	50.0	86.4	0.7	4.1	0.5	0.0	5.3
John Battle	64	0	10.0	45.5	0.0	72.8	1.0	1.2	0.4	0.0	4.3
Lorenzo Charles	36	0	7.6	55.7	0.0	66.7	1.1	0.2	0.1	0.2	3.4
Scott Hastings	62	0	10.5	40.9	75.0	85.7	2.0	0.4	0.2	0.1	3.1
Sedric Toney	3	0	8.0	28.6	0.0	100.0	0.7	0.0	0.3	0.0	1.7

=== Playoffs ===
Player	GP	GS	MPG	FG%	3FG%	FT%	RPG	APG	SPG	BPG	PPG
Dominique Wilkins	9	9	40.0	43.3	20.0	86.1	6.0	2.8	1.0	0.2	28.6
Randy Wittman	9	9	38.7	52.6	0.0	69.2	2.7	3.3	1.1	0.1	17.8
Kevin Willis	9	9	31.1	56.1	0.0	65.2	7.2	0.6	0.8	0.9	13.9
Doc Rivers	9	9	29.1	43.5	50.0	73.8	4.7	8.7	2.0	0.0	12.7
Spud Webb	9	0	20.3	51.9	0.0	78.8	3.4	7.2	0.4	0.1	12.2
Tree Rollins	9	9	27.6	55.3	0.0	63.6	8.7	0.3	0.2	1.7	6.6
Jon Koncak	9	0	21.4	48.3	0.0	56.5	3.8	0.6	0.7	1.1	6.0
Cliff Levingston	9	0	20.0	59.5	100.0	77.8	4.6	0.3	0.4	1.0	5.8
Scott Hastings	9	0	5.4	78.6	25.0	45.5	1.1	0.2	0.2	0.0	3.1
Johnny Davis	8	0	8.1	36.0	0.0	100.0	0.8	1.9	0.3	0.0	2.8
John Battle	6	0	4.5	36.4	0.0	75.0	0.7	0.3	0.3	0.0	1.8
Lorenzo Charles	4	0	3.8	75.0	0.0	100.0	0.5	0.5	0.0	0.0	1.8

Player statistics citation:

== Awards and records ==
=== Awards ===
- Mike Fratello, NBA Coach of the Year Award
- Stan Kasten, NBA Executive of the Year Award
- Dominique Wilkins, All-NBA First Team

== See also ==
- 1985-86 NBA season
