= Alexander Volkov (basketball) =

Ukrainian professional basketball player

Oleksandr Volkov
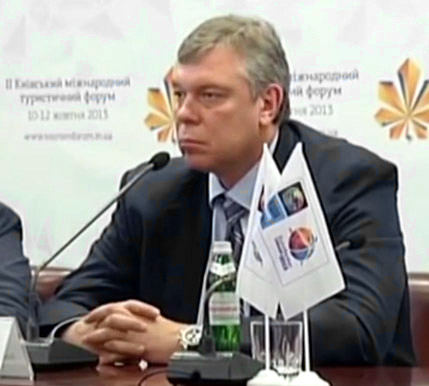
- Volkov in 2013

Personal information
- Born: 28 March 1964 (age 62) Omsk, Russian SFSR, Soviet Union
- Listed height: 6 ft 10 in (2.08 m)
- Listed weight: 243 lb (110 kg)

Career information
- NBA draft: 1986: 6th round, 134th overall pick
- Drafted by: Atlanta Hawks
- Playing career: 1981–2002
- Position: Power forward / center
- Number: 8

Career history
- 1981–1986: Stroitel
- 1986–1988: CSKA Moscow
- 1988–1989: Stroitel
- 1989–1992: Atlanta Hawks
- 1992–1993: Reggio Calabria
- 1993–1994: Panathinaikos
- 1994–1995: Olympiacos
- 2000–2002: Kyiv

Career highlights
- Greek League champion (1995); Greek All-Star Game (1994 II); 2× Soviet League champion (1988, 1989); Soviet League MVP (1989); Italian All-Star Game (1992); FIBA's 50 Greatest Players (1991); Order of Friendship (Russia) (2006); Order of Merit (Ukraine) (2011)
- Stats at NBA.com
- Stats at Basketball Reference
- FIBA Hall of Fame
Medals
Men's basketball
Representing the Soviet Union
Olympic Games
Gold medal – first place	1988 Seoul
FIBA World Cup
Silver medal – second place	1986 Spain
Silver medal – second place	1990 Argentina
EuroBasket
Gold medal – first place	1985 West Germany
Silver medal – second place	1987 Greece
Bronze medal – third place	1989 Yugoslavia

Oleksandr Anatoliyovych Volkov (Ukrainian: Олександр Анатолійович Волков; born 29 March 1964), commonly known as Sasha Volkov, is a Ukrainian former professional basketball player. He was born in Omsk, Russian SFSR, Soviet Union. At 6 ft 10 in (2.08 m) tall, he played at the power forward and center positions. He was versatile with the ball and quick on his feet, which made him a very sought after player.

== Professional career ==
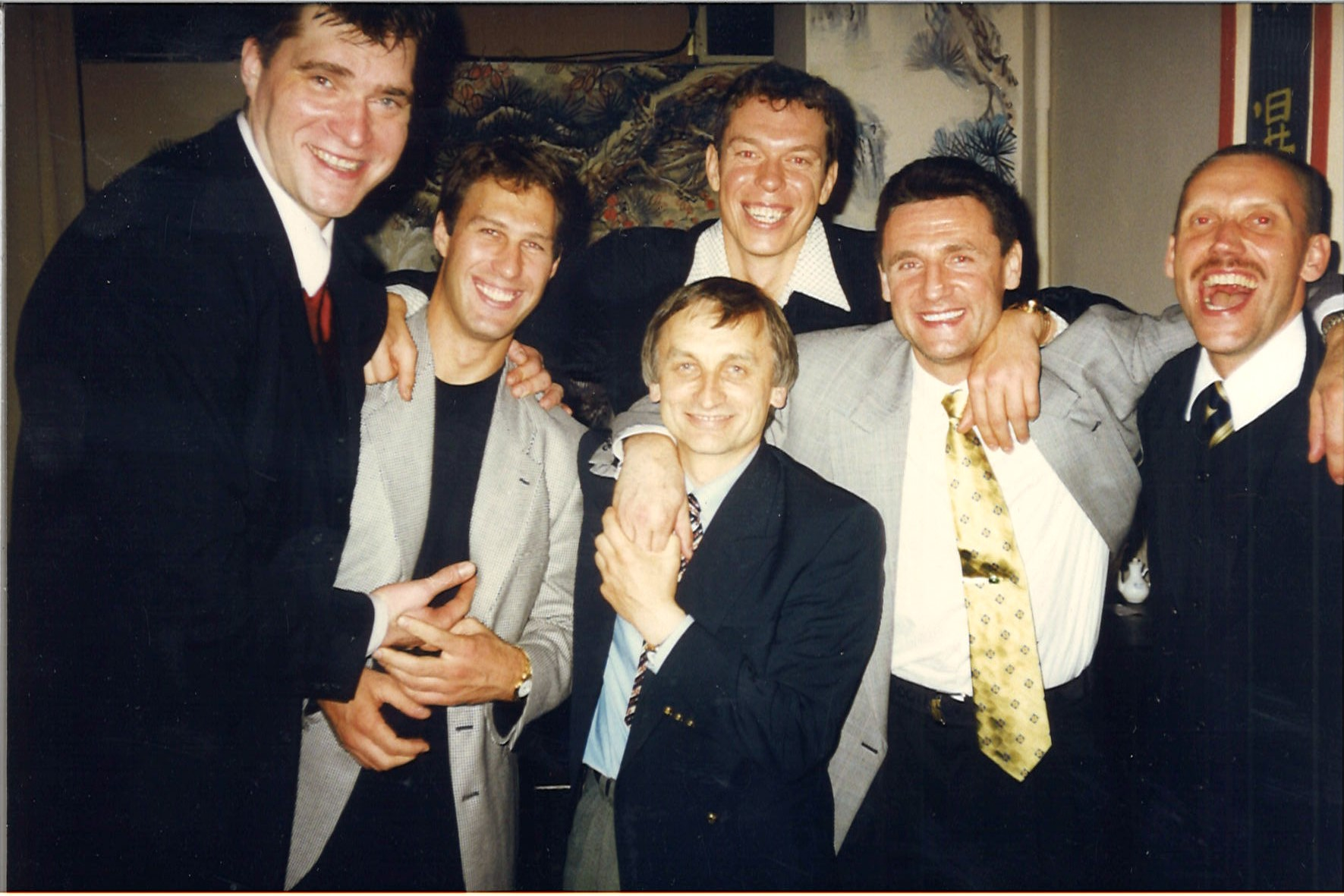
Volkov (upper center) with his former Soviet Union men's national basketball team teammates with who he won the 1988 Summer Olympics basketball tournament

Volkov played professionally for Stroitel (1981–1986; 1988–1989), CSKA Moscow (1986–1988), Atlanta Hawks (1989–1992), Panasonic Reggio Calabria (1992–1993), Panathinaikos (1993–1994), Olympiacos (1994–1995), and Kyiv (2000–2002).

In the USSR, he was also selected MVP in 1989, and was one of the key players on the Soviet national team since 1985, winning the gold medal at the 1988 Seoul Games.

In 1986, he was drafted by the Atlanta Hawks in the 6th round, together with CSKA Moscow teammate Valeri Tikhonenko. Fellow Soviet player Arvydas Sabonis was also drafted late in the first round. This was the second NBA draft when Soviet players were selected, after Alexander Belov was drafted in 1975. Volkov signed with the Hawks three years later on 1 August 1989. His brief career in NBA was hampered by injury as well as competition from several all-star front-men: Dominique Wilkins, Kevin Willis and Moses Malone. Volkov averaged 5 points and close to 2 rebounds per game during his first (89–90) season. After missing the whole next season, he came back stronger, roughly doubling his statistical output on the floor and even starting in 27 games. Afterwards, he chose to continue his career in Europe.

He was one of the founders of BC Kyiv. Volkov, who had already retired from playing in 1995, returned to play several games, to help the newly found team in 2000. He later also served as the team's president.

== National team career ==
Volkov won a gold medal at the 1988 Summer Olympics, as a member of the senior Soviet Union national basketball team. He also briefly came out of retirement, to play for the senior Ukrainian national basketball team, in 1998.

== NBA career statistics ==
Legend
GP	Games played	GS	Games started	MPG	Minutes per game
FG%	Field goal percentage	3P%	3-point field goal percentage	FT%	Free throw percentage
RPG	Rebounds per game	APG	Assists per game	SPG	Steals per game
BPG	Blocks per game	PPG	Points per game	**Bold**	Career high

=== Regular season ===
Year	Team	GP	GS	MPG	FG%	3P%	FT%	RPG	APG	SPG	BPG	PPG
1989–90	Atlanta	72	4	13.0	**.482**	**.382**	.583	1.7	1.2	.5	.3	5.0
1991–92	Atlanta	**77**	**27**	**19.7**	.441	.318	**.631**	**3.4**	**3.2**	**.9**	**.4**	**8.6**
Career		149	31	16.5	.455	.333	.613	2.6	2.2	.7	.3	6.8

== Political career ==
From 1999 to 2000, Volkov served as a chairman of the State Committee on Sports in Ukraine. In June 2007, he was elected the head of the Ukrainian Basketball Federation.

Volkov was elected to the Ukrainian Parliament in 2006 on the party list of the Our Ukraine Bloc. But against the will of his faction, he joined the Anti-Crisis Coalition, which prompted early elections. In the early parliamentary elections in 2007 he was reelected to Parliament through the Party of Regions. Volkov was again elected through the Party of Regions to the Ukrainian Parliament in 2012. But left this party's faction in parliament on 17 April 2014. and joined the (then new) faction Economic Development one week later. In the 2014 Ukrainian parliamentary election Volkov failed to get reelected into parliament; he was number 9 on the election list of Strong Ukraine, but the party won only one constituency parliamentary seat.

== Personal life ==
In 2022, following the Russian invasion of Ukraine, Volkov joined Ukrainian volunteers fighting against Russian forces. Volkov's family home in Chernihiv was destroyed by the bombings.

Preceded by Ivan Fedorenko	Chairman of the State Committee on Physical Culture and Sports; 1999–2000	Succeeded by Ivan Fedorenko (Chairman of the State Committee of Youth, Sports, and Tourism)
