= Duane Ferrell =

American basketball player (born 1965)

Personal information
- Born: February 28, 1965 (age 61) Baltimore, Maryland, U.S.
- Listed height: 6 ft 7 in (2.01 m)
- Listed weight: 215 lb (98 kg)

Career information
- High school: Calvert Hall College (Towson, Maryland)
- College: Georgia Tech (1984–1988)
- NBA draft: 1988: undrafted
- Playing career: 1988–1999
- Position: Shooting guard / small forward
- Number: 27, 33

Career history
- 1988–1989: Atlanta Hawks
- 1989–1990: Topeka Sizzlers
- 1990–1994: Atlanta Hawks
- 1994–1997: Indiana Pacers
- 1997–1999: Golden State Warriors

Career highlights
- All-CBA Second Team (1990); CBA Newcomer of the Year (1990); 2× Second-team All-ACC (1987, 1988); ACC Rookie of the Year (1985); Second-team Parade All-American (1984); McDonald's All-American (1984)

Career statistics
- Points: 3,704 (6.4 ppg)
- Rebound: 1,132 (1.9 rpg)
- Assists: 509 (0.9 apg)
- Stats at NBA.com
- Stats at Basketball Reference

Duane Ferrell (born February 28, 1965) is an American former professional basketball player. He played 11 seasons in the National Basketball Association (NBA) for the Atlanta Hawks, Indiana Pacers and Golden State Warriors. He played college basketball for the Georgia Tech Yellow Jackets, twice earning All-Atlantic Coast Conference (ACC) honors.

== Early life and college career ==
Ferrell attended high school at Calvert Hall College in Towson, Maryland where he was part of the 1982 National Championship team, the number one rated high school team in the country during his sophomore year. He then attended Georgia Tech from 1984 to 1988. Ferrell was named the 1985 Atlantic Coast Conference Rookie of the Year and went on to average 18.6 points per game during his senior year at Georgia Tech.

== Professional basketball career ==
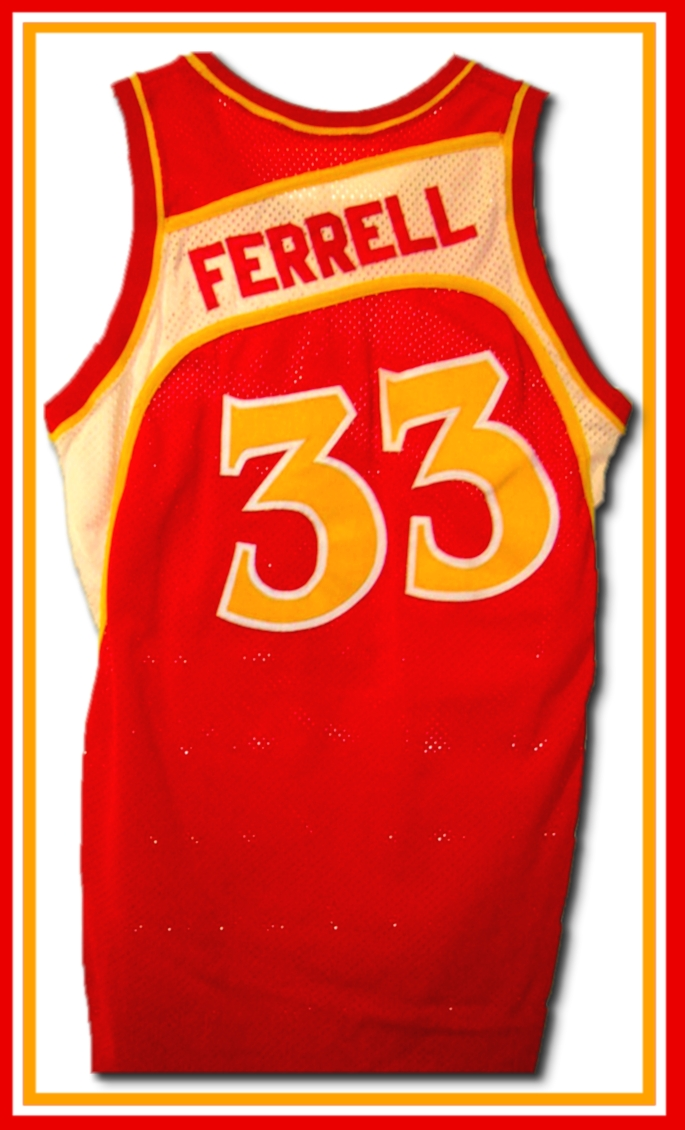
Ferrell enjoyed his most productive seasons in the NBA as a member of the Hawks

Duane Ferrell was never drafted but found his way into the NBA after being signed as a free agent by the Atlanta Hawks in 1988. Ferrell would go on to play in six seasons with the Hawks in the reserve role. His best season came in 1991–92, where he produced a career high of 12.7 points per game while averaging 24.2 minutes per game with Atlanta. In the 1989–90 season, Ferrell started the year playing 40 games for the Topeka Sizzlers in the Continental Basketball Association, averaging 24.3 points per game and earning CBA Newcomer of the Year honors. His performance earned him a return trip to the Hawks to end the season.

Ferrell became a free agent at the end of the 1993–94 NBA season and was signed by the Indiana Pacers on September 30, 1994.

After three seasons in Indiana, Ferrell and Pacers teammate Erick Dampier were traded to the Golden State Warriors for All-Star veteran Chris Mullin on August 12, 1997. Ferrell finished his NBA career with the Warriors, amassing a total of 11 seasons in the league with five NBA Playoffs runs (three times with the Hawks and twice with the Pacers). In 1999, he was traded back to the Hawks alongside Bimbo Coles in a deal that sent Mookie Blaylock to the Warriors. Ferrell was waived by the Hawks, ending his career.

He also worked as the Player Relations and Programs Manager for the Atlanta Hawks and Washington Wizards. Ferrell is also involved with On Court Player Development, a basketball academy and community organization that seeks to develop grassroots basketball programs.

Ferrell has had the nickname "Paco" since his college playing days.

== Career statistics ==
Legend
GP	Games played	GS	Games started	MPG	Minutes per game
FG%	Field goal percentage	3P%	3-point field goal percentage	FT%	Free throw percentage
RPG	Rebounds per game	APG	Assists per game	SPG	Steals per game
BPG	Blocks per game	PPG	Points per game	**Bold**	Career high

=== NBA ===
==== Regular season ====
Year	Team	GP	GS	MPG	FG%	3P%	FT%	RPG	APG	SPG	BPG	PPG
1988–89	Atlanta	41	0	5.6	.422	–	.682	1.0	.2	.2	.1	2.4
1989–90	Atlanta	14	0	2.1	.357	.000	.333	.5	.1	.1	.0	.9
1990–91	Atlanta	78	2	14.9	.489	**.667**	**.801**	2.3	.7	.4	**.3**	6.1
1991–92	Atlanta	66	12	**24.2**	**.524**	.333	.761	**3.2**	1.4	**.7**	**.3**	**12.7**
1992–93	Atlanta	**82**	15	21.2	.470	.250	.779	2.3	**1.6**	**.7**	.2	10.2
1993–94	Atlanta	72	13	16.0	.485	.111	.783	1.8	.9	.6	.2	7.1
1994–95	Indiana	56	1	10.8	.480	.167	.753	1.6	.6	.5	.1	4.1
1995–96	Indiana	54	6	10.9	.482	.000	.737	1.7	.6	.4	.1	3.7
1996–97	Indiana	62	**18**	18.0	.472	.409	.617	2.3	1.1	.6	.1	6.4
1997–98	Golden State	50	5	9.2	.369	.000	.545	.9	.5	.4	.1	1.9
1998–99	Golden State	8	0	5.8	.071	–	.750	.8	.0	.1	.1	.6
Career		583	72	15.0	.480	.288	.750	1.9	.9	.5	.2	6.4

==== Playoffs ====
Year	Team	GP	GS	MPG	FG%	3P%	FT%	RPG	APG	SPG	BPG	PPG
1991	Atlanta	5	0	14.6	.444	–	.667	**3.4**	.6	.0	.0	4.8
1993	Atlanta	3	0	**18.0**	**.609**	.333	**.800**	1.7	.3	.0	.0	**11.0**
1994	Atlanta	**11**	0	17.0	.397	.250	.750	2.8	**1.5**	.5	**.3**	7.1
1995	Indiana	10	0	8.5	.333	**.500**	.625	1.1	1.3	.0	.2	2.7
1996	Indiana	5	0	13.8	.368	–	.500	1.8	.6	**.8**	.0	3.6
Career		34	0	13.8	.422	.333	.688	2.1	1.1	.3	.1	5.3
