= Antoine Carr =

American basketball player (born 1961)

Personal information
- Born: July 23, 1961 (age 65) Oklahoma City, Oklahoma, U.S.
- Listed height: 6 ft 9 in (2.06 m)
- Listed weight: 225 lb (102 kg)

Career information
- High school: Wichita Heights (Wichita, Kansas)
- College: Wichita State (1979–1983)
- NBA draft: 1983: 1st round, 8th overall pick
- Drafted by: Detroit Pistons
- Playing career: 1983–2002
- Position: Power forward / center
- Number: 33, 35, 55

Career history
- 1983–1984: Olimpia Milano
- 1984–1990: Atlanta Hawks
- 1990–1991: Sacramento Kings
- 1991–1994: San Antonio Spurs
- 1994–1998: Utah Jazz
- 1999: Houston Rockets
- 1999–2000: Vancouver Grizzlies
- 2000–2001: Kansas City Knights
- 2001–2002: Ionikos NF

Career highlights
- Greek All-Star (2002); Third-team All-American – AP (1983); MVC Player of the Year (1983); 2× First-team All-MVC (1982, 1983); 2× Second-team All-MVC (1980, 1981); No. 35 retired by Wichita State Shockers; McDonald's All-American (1979); Second-team Parade All-American (1979)

Career NBA statistics
- Points: 9,176 (9.3 ppg)
- Rebounds: 3,384 (3.4 rpg)
- Blocks: 925 (0.9 bpg)
- Stats at NBA.com
- Stats at Basketball Reference
Medals
Representing United States
World Championships
Silver medal – second place	1982 Colombia	National team

Antoine Labotte Carr (born July 23, 1961) is an American former basketball player. Nicknamed "Big Dawg", he played power forward (and sometimes center) for six different teams in the National Basketball Association across 16 seasons.

== Early life ==
Antoine Carr was born in Oklahoma City and was a star basketball player at Wichita Heights High School (class of 1979). He accepted a scholarship to play locally at Wichita State University. A four-year player, Carr was a major contributor on a team that included future NBA players Xavier McDaniel and Cliff Levingston, averaging 17 points per game while shooting over 55% during his college career. In his final college game, he scored a school-record 47 points against Southern Illinois on March 5, 1983.

He played for the US national team in the 1982 FIBA World Championship, winning the silver medal.

== Professional career ==
Coming off a senior season where he'd averaged 22.5 points and 7.6 rebounds a game in a strong college program, Carr was selected by the Detroit Pistons in the first round (eighth pick overall) of the 1983 NBA draft. Carr was unable to agree to a contract with the Pistons and played the 1983–84 season in Italy with Simac Milano after the club offered him a $200,000 contract for the year. Returning to the NBA in the 1984–85 season, he played six full seasons with the Atlanta Hawks, who had acquired his rights, before moving to the Sacramento Kings in the middle of the 1989–90 campaign. While in Sacramento, Carr averaged 20 points per game and was one of the team's stars. He scored 1,551 points that season, his only time topping 1,000 points and by far his best scoring season. Carr also played for the San Antonio Spurs, where he led the team in field goal percentage. He also played a notable first-round series in 1992 against the Phoenix Suns. Carr was filling in for an injured David Robinson, who had a fractured hand. Carr put on what could be considered the best games of his career, but the Spurs still lost the series 0–3. Carr was signed as a free agent by the Utah Jazz on October 29, 1994, where he was a periodic starter at the center position beside power forward Karl Malone. When not starting, he settled into his role as the energetic and jovial sixth man. Coach Jerry Sloan utilized Carr extensively during the two years that the Jazz reached the NBA finals – relying on his experience and ability to control the ball. Carr helped the Jazz to victory in Game 5 of the 1998 Finals against the Chicago Bulls with several clutch jump shots. Carr finished his career with the Houston Rockets and Vancouver Grizzlies, playing 18 games with Houston and 21 with Vancouver in a reserve role.

Carr scored 9,176 points in his NBA career. Carr had a strong ability to manage the ball down low, even as a small center. He was known for his power and dunking, and his ability to hit medium to long jump shots under pressure. He made 50% of his attempts from the floor and shot 78% from the free-throw line. After receiving an eye injury, Carr wore orange-tinted protective glasses for the rest of his NBA career.

Following his final season with Vancouver, Carr played one season for the Kansas City Knights of the ABA, and one season with the Greek club Ionikos NF.

His younger brother Henry Carr played for Wichita State, and was drafted in 1987 by the Los Angeles Clippers.

== NBA career statistics ==
Legend
GP	Games played	GS	Games started	MPG	Minutes per game
FG%	Field goal percentage	3P%	3-point field goal percentage	FT%	Free throw percentage
RPG	Rebounds per game	APG	Assists per game	SPG	Steals per game
BPG	Blocks per game	PPG	Points per game	**Bold**	Career high

=== Regular season ===
Year	Team	GP	GS	MPG	FG%	3P%	FT%	RPG	APG	SPG	BPG	PPG
1984–85	Atlanta	62	15	19.3	.528	**.333**	.789	3.7	1.3	0.5	**1.3**	8.0
1985–86	Atlanta	17	0	15.2	.527	–	.667	3.1	0.8	0.4	0.9	6.8
1986–87	Atlanta	65	2	10.7	.506	**.333**	.709	2.4	0.5	0.2	0.7	5.3
1987–88	Atlanta	80	2	18.5	**.544**	.250	.780	3.6	1.3	0.5	1.0	8.8
1988–89	Atlanta	78	12	19.1	.480	.000	**.855**	3.5	1.2	0.4	0.8	7.5
1989–90	Atlanta	44	0	18.3	.516	.000	.775	3.4	1.2	0.3	0.8	7.6
1989–90	Sacramento	33	4	28.0	.482	.000	.806	5.2	2.0	0.5	1.0	18.6
1990–91	Sacramento	77	**48**	**32.8**	.511	.000	.758	**5.5**	**2.5**	**0.6**	**1.3**	**20.1**
1991–92	San Antonio	81	27	23.0	.490	.200	.764	4.3	2.8	1.4	1.2	10.9
1992–93	San Antonio	71	46	27.4	.538	.000	.777	**5.5**	1.4	0.5	1.2	13.1
1993–94	San Antonio	34	0	13.7	.488	.000	.724	1.5	0.4	0.3	0.6	5.8
1994–95	Utah	78	4	21.5	.531	.250	.821	3.4	0.9	0.3	0.9	9.6
1995–96	Utah	80	0	19.2	.457	.000	.792	2.5	0.9	0.4	0.8	7.3
1996–97	Utah	**82**	0	17.8	.483	.000	.780	2.4	0.9	0.3	0.8	7.4
1997–98	Utah	66	8	16.5	.465	–	.776	2.0	0.7	0.2	0.8	5.7
1998–99	Houston	18	0	8.4	.404	.000	.714	1.7	0.5	0.1	0.6	2.6
1999–00	Vancouver	21	0	10.5	.438	–	.786	1.5	0.3	0.1	0.3	3.2
Career		987	168	20.0	.503	.130	.780	3.4	1.1	0.4	0.9	9.3

=== Playoffs ===
Year	Team	GP	GS	MPG	FG%	3P%	FT%	RPG	APG	SPG	BPG	PPG
1987	Atlanta	9	0	18.0	**.696**	–	.813	3.0	**1.4**	0.3	0.9	11.6
1988	Atlanta	12	0	17.5	.529	.000	.643	3.4	1.3	0.3	1.4	6.8
1989	Atlanta	5	0	16.2	.619	–	.727	1.6	**1.4**	0.0	0.8	6.8
1992	San Antonio	3	3	**36.3**	.545	**.500**	.625	**7.7**	1.0	**0.7**	**3.7**	**19.7**
1993	San Antonio	8	**8**	21.4	.527	–	.600	4.8	1.1	0.4	1.1	10.5
1994	San Antonio	3	0	12.3	.455	–	**.889**	0.3	1.0	0.3	0.7	6.0
1995	Utah	5	0	22.8	.452	–	.833	3.0	1.4	0.6	1.0	9.6
1996	Utah	18	0	18.8	.474	–	.680	1.9	1.2	0.2	0.8	6.1
1997	Utah	**20**	0	14.0	.482	–	.750	2.0	0.5	0.3	0.5	4.9
1998	Utah	**20**	0	14.6	.456	–	.750	2.1	0.6	0.1	0.6	4.4
1999	Houston	4	0	9.3	.364	–	–	1.8	1.0	0.0	0.3	2.0
Career		107	11	17.1	.514	.333	.740	2.6	1.0	0.3	0.9	6.8
