= Jon Koncak =

American basketball player (born 1963)

Personal information
- Born: May 17, 1963 (age 63) Cedar Rapids, Iowa, U.S.
- Listed height: 7 ft 0 in (2.13 m)
- Listed weight: 250 lb (113 kg)

Career information
- High school: Center (Kansas City, Missouri)
- College: SMU (1981–1985)
- NBA draft: 1985: 1st round, 5th overall pick
- Drafted by: Atlanta Hawks
- Playing career: 1985–1996
- Position: Center / power forward
- Number: 32, 45

Career history
- 1985–1995: Atlanta Hawks
- 1995–1996: Orlando Magic

Career highlights
- Consensus second-team All-American (1985); 2× First-team All-SWC (1984, 1985)

Career NBA statistics
- Points: 3,520 (4.5 ppg)
- Rebounds: 3,856 (4.9 rpg)
- Blocks: 791 (1.0 bpg)
- Stats at NBA.com
- Stats at Basketball Reference
Medals
Men's basketball
Representing the United States
Olympic Games
Gold medal – first place	1984 Los Angeles	Team competition

Jon Francis Koncak (born May 17, 1963) is an American former professional basketball player. A 7 ft (2.1 m) center / power forward from Southern Methodist University (SMU), Koncak was selected with the fifth pick in the 1985 NBA draft by the Atlanta Hawks. Koncak spent ten seasons with the Hawks (1985–1995), mainly in a reserve role, then concluded his career with the Orlando Magic. He retired in 1996 with career totals of 3,520 points and 3,856 rebounds.

Koncak received a six-year, $13 million contract from the Hawks in 1989 – an unprecedented total for a reserve. Since he was a restricted free agent at the time, the Atlanta Hawks matched this offer from the Detroit Pistons. As a result, he earned the derisive nickname Jon Contract.

On February 23, 2008, SMU retired Koncak's jersey. Koncak is an Eagle Scout.

Koncak also won a gold medal at the 1984 Summer Olympics as a part of the US men's basketball team.

== Career statistics ==
Legend
GP	Games played	GS	Games started	MPG	Minutes per game
FG%	Field goal percentage	3P%	3-point field goal percentage	FT%	Free throw percentage
RPG	Rebounds per game	APG	Assists per game	SPG	Steals per game
BPG	Blocks per game	PPG	Points per game	**Bold**	Career high
*	Led the league

=== NBA ===
==== Regular season ====
Year	Team	GP	GS	MPG	FG%	3P%	FT%	RPG	APG	SPG	BPG	PPG
1985–86	Atlanta	**82**	15	20.7	.507	.000	.607	5.7	.7	.5	.8	**8.3**
1986–87	Atlanta	**82***	19	20.5	.480	.000	.654	6.0	.4	.6	.9	5.6
1987–88	Atlanta	49	22	21.9	.483	.000	.610	**6.8**	.4	.7	1.1	5.7
1988–89	Atlanta	74	22	20.7	.524	.000	.553	6.1	.8	.7	1.3	4.7
1989–90	Atlanta	54	28	18.1	**.614**	.000	.532	4.2	.4	.7	.6	3.7
1990–91	Atlanta	77	61	25.1	.436	.125	.593	4.9	1.6	**1.0**	1.0	4.1
1991–92	Atlanta	77	14	19.3	.391	.000	.655	3.4	1.7	.6	.9	3.1
1992–93	Atlanta	78	65	**25.3**	.464	**.375**	.480	5.5	**1.8**	**1.0**	1.3	3.5
1993–94	Atlanta	**82***	**78**	22.2	.431	.000	**.667**	4.5	1.2	.8	**1.5**	4.2
1994–95	Atlanta	62	20	15.2	.412	.333	.542	3.0	.8	.6	.7	2.9
1995–96	Orlando	67	35	19.2	.480	.333	.561	4.1	.8	.4	.7	3.0
Career		784	379	20.9	.470	.226	.597	4.9	1.0	.7	1.0	4.5

==== Playoffs ====
Year	Team	GP	GS	MPG	FG%	3P%	FT%	RPG	APG	SPG	BPG	PPG
1986	Atlanta	9	0	21.4	.483	–	.565	3.8	.6	.7	1.1	6.0
1987	Atlanta	8	0	10.8	.538	–	.750	3.1	.4	.4	.5	2.5
1989	Atlanta	5	5	**38.4**	**.621**	–	.848	**9.6**	.8	.4	1.6	**12.8**
1991	Atlanta	5	5	26.6	.286	–	**1.000**	4.6	**1.4**	.4	.8	2.0
1993	Atlanta	3	3	29.7	.100	–	.500	8.0	1.3	**1.0**	**1.7**	1.0
1994	Atlanta	11	**11**	17.7	.409	–	.400	2.7	1.2	.5	1.1	5.3
1996	Orlando	**12**	3	11.7	.571	–	.429	1.9	.3	.4	.3	.9
Career		53	27	19.4	.446	–	.648	3.9	.7	.5	.9	4.2
