= Spud Webb =

American basketball player (born 1963)

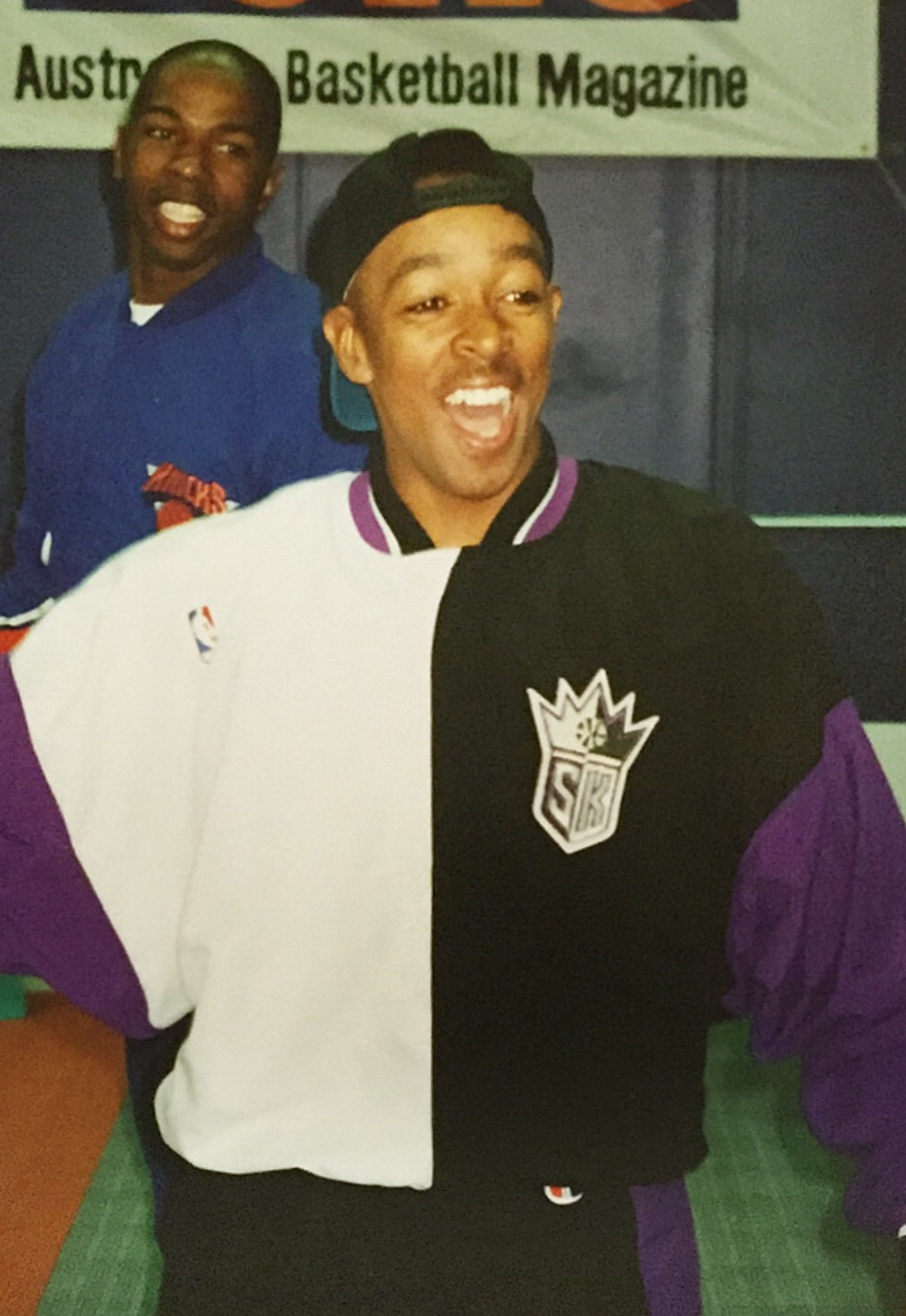
- Webb at an Australian basketball exhibition in 1994

Texas Legends
- Title: President of basketball operations
- League: NBA G League

Personal information
- Born: July 13, 1963 (age 63) Dallas, Texas, U.S.
- Listed height: 5 ft 7 in (1.70 m)
- Listed weight: 133 lb (60 kg)

Career information
- High school: Wilmer-Hutchins (Dallas, Texas)
- College: Midland (1981–1983); NC State (1983–1985)
- NBA draft: 1985: 4th round, 87th overall pick
- Drafted by: Detroit Pistons
- Playing career: 1985–1998
- Position: Point guard
- Number: 4

Career history
- 1985: Rhode Island Gulls
- 1985–1991: Atlanta Hawks
- 1991–1995: Sacramento Kings
- 1995–1996: Atlanta Hawks
- 1996: Minnesota Timberwolves
- 1996–1997: Mash J. Verona
- 1998: Orlando Magic
- 1998: Idaho Stampede

Career highlights
- NBA Slam Dunk Contest champion (1986); USBL All-Star Game (1985)

Career NBA statistics
- Points: 8,072 (9.9 ppg)
- Rebounds: 1,742 (2.1 rpg)
- Assists: 4,342 (5.3 apg)
- Stats at NBA.com
- Stats at Basketball Reference

Anthony Jerome "Spud" Webb (born July 13, 1963) is an American former professional basketball player. A 5 ft 7 in (170 cm) point guard, Webb played college basketball at Midland College and at North Carolina State University. He then played for four teams in the National Basketball Association (NBA) in a professional career that spanned from 1985 to 1998. Webb also played professional basketball in the United States Basketball League, in the Continental Basketball Association, and in Italy.

Webb is one of the shortest players in NBA history. He is known for having won the 1986 NBA Slam Dunk Contest. Webb has served as president of basketball operations for the Texas Legends, the NBA G League affiliate of the Dallas Mavericks, since 2010.

== Early years ==
Webb was born into poverty in Dallas, Texas. He received his nickname when he was a newborn baby in the hospital and a visitor remarked to his parents that his round head resembled the Sputnik satellite. By the time he was brought home from the hospital, "Sputnik" had been shortened to "Spud."

Webb was raised in a small two-bedroom apartment and saw basketball as an inspiration. Webb was not tall, but he used his quickness and jumping ability to outplay bigger kids. Starting in the seventh grade, Webb was told that he was too short to play basketball. He got a chance to play on his junior high team only after two players did not complete physical exam requirements in time for the first game. Webb scored 22 points in his first game. He could dunk the ball when he was 5 ft 3 in (1.60 m) tall. At Wilmer-Hutchins High School, he played on the junior varsity team and made a large impact; when he made the varsity team, he averaged 26 points per game as a senior.

== College career ==
=== Midland College ===
Despite his impressive high school record, Webb attracted little interest from colleges. He was recruited by North Texas Basketball Coach Bill Blakeley (who would later become his agent throughout his NBA career) but received his first opportunity to play on a college basketball team at Midland College (in Midland, Texas), where he led the Chaparrals to the junior college national title in 1982. In the championship game, Midland defeated top-ranked and previously unbeaten Miami-Dade North of Florida, 93–88, in double overtime. Webb led all scorers in with 36 points, shooting 10–15 from the floor and 16–18 from the line. His performance at the tournament earned Webb a write-up in Sports Illustrated and national attention. In 1983, he was named an NJCAA All-American by the National Junior College Athletic Association.

=== North Carolina State University ===
Webb was planning to transfer to North Texas to play for Bill Blakeley, but Blakeley was fired in May 1983. Webb prepared to go work with his dad at Webb's Soul Mart near Fair Park in Dallas. Coach Blakeley reached out to his friend, Tom Abatemarco, an assistant coach at North Carolina State University, and took him to watch Webb play in a summer league game at MLK Recreation Center. Abatemarco was impressed and arranged for Webb to meet head coach Jim Valvano, who offered Webb a scholarship. In college, his vertical leap was measured at 42 inches (1.1 m). He played for NC State in the 1983–84 and 1984–85 seasons, averaging 10.4 points and 5.7 assists.

== Professional career ==
=== Atlanta Hawks (1985–1991) ===
Most scouts predicted that Webb would end up playing in either Europe or for the Harlem Globetrotters because of his height (5 ft 6 in (168 cm)). However, Webb was drafted in the 4th round of the 1985 NBA draft by the Detroit Pistons. After the guard-loaded Pistons released Webb before the preseason even started, his agent, Bill Blakeley, arranged for a tryout with the Atlanta Hawks where Webb beat out several seasoned guards to make the opening roster.

On March 5, 1991, Webb scored a then-career-best 32 points to lead the Hawks to a 139–127 win over the Denver Nuggets.

==== 1986 NBA Slam Dunk Contest ====
Webb was the shortest person to compete in the NBA Slam Dunk Contest, winning the event in 1986 at Dallas' Reunion Arena. His participation surprised the media; including his teammate and defending dunk champion Dominique Wilkins, who had "never seen me dunk before", Webb said. His dunks included the elevator two-handed double pump dunk, the off-the-backboard one-handed jam, a 360-degree helicopter one-handed dunk, a reverse double-pump slam, and finally, the reverse two-handed jam from a lob bounce off the floor. He defeated Wilkins with two perfect 50-point scores in the final round. Atlanta coach Mike Fratello said, "Spud kind of duped him. He told Wilkins he never had anything prepared, didn't practice for it. So, Wilkins maybe thought his normal assortment would be good enough to get through".

The 1986 Slam Dunk victory, along with his play as a rookie and fan favorite, helped Webb to garner dozens of national endorsements from companies such as Pony Shoes, Coca-Cola, Church's Fried Chicken, Baden Basketball, Hardee's Hamburgers, Sunkist Oranges, Southland Corp and Chips Ahoy!

=== Sacramento Kings (1991–1995) ===
Webb played his first six seasons with the Atlanta Hawks before he was traded to the Sacramento Kings for Travis Mays, where he had his best years statistically and played as a starter from 1992 to 1995. Webb posted career highs of 16.0 points and 7.1 assists per game in his first season with the Kings. He also led the NBA in free throw shooting in his last season in Sacramento, shooting 93.4 percent in 1994–95 (after shooting 81.3 percent the previous season).

=== Return to Atlanta (1995–1996) ===
In 1995, Webb was traded back to the Atlanta Hawks for Tyrone Corbin.

=== Minnesota Timberwolves (1996) ===
Webb played half of the 1995–96 season with the Hawks before he was traded with Andrew Lang to the Minnesota Timberwolves for Christian Laettner and Sean Rooks.

=== Orlando Magic (1998) ===
Webb finished his career after one season with the Orlando Magic, ultimately retiring from professional basketball in 1998.

=== Career accomplishments and legacy ===
Webb had over 50 games with 20 points or more, including a career high 34 points against the Golden State Warriors on April 21, 1993, while with the Kings and a career high 18 assists against the Detroit Pistons on April 19, 1986, while with the Hawks. Webb played 814 games in his 12-year NBA career, averaging 9.9 points per game, scoring 8,072 points, and registering 4,342 assists.

As of the 2024–25 NBA season, Webb is tied with Mel Hirsch for being the third-shortest player in NBA history. Only two NBA players have been shorter than him: 5-foot-3-inch (1.60 m) Muggsy Bogues and 5-foot-5-inch (1.65 m) Earl Boykins.

== Later endeavors ==
Twenty years after Webb's victory in the Slam Dunk contest, he trained New York Knicks point guard Nate Robinson (who stands at 5 feet 9 inches tall) to win the event. Webb tossed the ball to Robinson, who leaped over Webb and dunked, earning 50 points from the judges. Robinson went on to win, making him and Webb the only two people in NBA history under six feet tall to win a slam dunk contest.

Webb was a judge for the 2010 Dunk contest in Dallas, held at the American Airlines Center. The 2010 dunk contest marked the first time the event had been held in Dallas since Webb's victory in 1986.

In February 2010, the Dallas Morning News reported that Webb had been hired as president of basketball operations by a new NBA Development League team to be based in Frisco, Texas. That team would become known as the Texas Legends. As of June 2026, Webb remains the president of basketball operations for the Legends, who compete in the NBA G League and are affiliated with the Dallas Mavericks of the NBA.

== NBA career statistics ==
Legend
GP	Games played	GS	Games started	MPG	Minutes per game
FG%	Field goal percentage	3P%	3-point field goal percentage	FT%	Free throw percentage
RPG	Rebounds per game	APG	Assists per game	SPG	Steals per game
BPG	Blocks per game	PPG	Points per game	**Bold**	Career high
*	Led the league

=== Regular season ===
Year	Team	GP	GS	MPG	FG%	3P%	FT%	RPG	APG	SPG	BPG	PPG
1985–86	Atlanta	79	8	15.6	**.483**	.182	.785	1.6	4.3	1.0	.1	7.8
1986–87	Atlanta	33	0	16.1	.438	.167	.762	1.8	5.1	1.0	.1	6.8
1987–88	Atlanta	**82**	1	16.4	.475	.053	.817	1.8	4.1	.8	.1	6.0
1988–89	Atlanta	81	6	15.0	.459	.045	.867	1.5	3.5	.9	.1	3.9
1989–90	Atlanta	**82***	46	26.6	.477	.053	.871	2.5	5.8	1.3	.1	9.2
1990–91	Atlanta	75	64	29.3	.447	.321	.868	2.3	5.6	1.6	.1	13.4
1991–92	Sacramento	77	**77**	**35.4**	.445	.367	.859	**2.9**	**7.1**	**1.6**	**.3**	**16.0**
1992–93	Sacramento	69	68	33.8	.433	.274	.851	2.8	7.0	1.5	.1	14.5
1993–94	Sacramento	79	62	32.5	.460	.335	.813	2.3	6.7	1.2	**.3**	12.7
1994–95	Sacramento	76	76	32.3	.438	.331	.934*	2.3	6.2	1.0	.1	11.6
1995–96	Atlanta	51	0	16.0	.468	.316	.851	1.2	2.7	.5	.0	5.9
1995–96	Minnesota	26	21	24.8	.394	**.403**	.879	1.5	5.9	1.0	.2	9.4
1997–98	Orlando	4	0	8.5	.417	.000	**1.000**	.8	1.3	.3	.0	3.0
Career		814	429	24.9	.452	.314	.848	2.1	5.3	1.1	.1	9.9

=== Playoffs ===
Year	Team	GP	GS	MPG	FG%	3P%	FT%	RPG	APG	SPG	BPG	PPG
1986	Atlanta	9	0	20.3	**.519**	.000	.738	3.4	**7.2**	.4	.1	12.2
1987	Atlanta	8	1	15.3	.474	.000	.765	1.0	4.8	.8	.0	3.9
1988	Atlanta	**12**	0	17.6	.432	.250	.919	1.7	4.7	.8	.0	8.8
1989	Atlanta	5	0	11.0	.273	–	**1.000**	.8	3.0	.8	.0	1.6
1991	Atlanta	5	**5**	**30.8**	.439	**.417**	.688	**4.4**	4.8	**1.4**	**.2**	**13.2**
Career		39	6	18.6	.458	.304	.819	2.2	5.1	.8	.1	8.2

== See also ==
- List of shortest players in National Basketball Association history
