= Pete Babcock =

American sports team administrator

Peter Babcock is a former NBA executive, who served as general manager of the San Diego Clippers (1983 to 1985), the Denver Nuggets (1985 to 1990), where he also served as president and minority shareholder his last two seasons, and the Atlanta Hawks (1990 to 2003). His Nuggets and Hawks teams appeared in the playoffs 14 out of 15 seasons.

Over a 42-year career, he also served in several different capacities with the New Orleans Jazz, Los Angeles Lakers, Milwaukee Bucks, Toronto Raptors and Cleveland Cavaliers, including scouting, coaching, and player personnel roles.

Babcock directed the NBA Pre-Draft Camp for over twenty years and served on the NBA's Competition and Rules Committee and Steering Committee.

He was a member of the USA Basketball's Men's Selection Committee that picked the 1996 Olympic team and head coach.

In 2023, Babcock was nominated to the Naismith Basketball Hall of Fame in the Contributor category for the Class of 2024.

== Career ==
=== Denver Nuggets ===
Babcock was with the Denver Nuggets from 1985 to 1990. Under his leadership, the team made the playoffs six out of six years, won two division championships, and went to the Western Conference Finals in 1985.

During his time in Denver, he initiated the "Fast Break for Life Tour,” which had NBA players visit annually with young people at Native American reservations throughout the country. He continued the program for the 15 years. President Ronald Reagan honored Babcock and Alex English for this work in a Rose Garden ceremony. In 1988, Babcock testified before Congress about the need to increase youth substance abuse research.

=== Atlanta Hawks ===
From 1990 to 1993, Babcock rebuilt the Atlanta team, which made the playoffs two of three seasons and finished the 1993–94 season with the Eastern Conference's best record and the division championship. He added Mookie Blaylock, Steve Smith, Dikembe Mutombo, Craig Ehlo, Grant Long, and Christian Laettner as players and hired Hall of Fame coach Lenny Wilkens. The team had a six-year run averaging over 50 wins per season.

Babcock initiated a "Life Experience Program” to enhance players’ exposure to a robust life off the court. Players visited a variety of important historical, government, and cultural sites, including Ford's Theater in Washington DC, NORAD in Colorado Springs, the Black Cowboy Museum in Denver, Ground Zero in NYC just months after 9/11, and the Pentagon. The players heard from a variety of speakers, including Congressman John Lewis, former UCLA basketball coach John Wooden, and U.S. Ambassador to the U.N. Andrew Young.

While in Atlanta, Babcock was recognized for his community involvement. The Georgia Special Olympics named him Sports Personality of the Year, the Atlanta Public Schools gave him the Golden Apple Award, and the Atlanta Mayor honored him with the prestigious Phoenix Award.

Although the Hawks finished the lockout season of 1999 only two games off the best record in the East and lost to the New York Knicks in the second round, the team decided to rebuild again. They followed Babcock's usual methods, trading, signing free agents, and using draft picks, usually later in the first round, as role players. They traded Steve Smith for Isaiah Rider and Dikembe Mutombo for Theo Ratliff, Nazr Mohammed, Toni Kukoč and Pepe Sanchez. The Hawks's performance did not improve, and Babcock was fired in April 2003.

=== Toronto Raptors ===
After leaving the Hawks, Babcock joined the Toronto Raptors, where his brother, Rob Babcock, was the general manager. He left after two years.

=== Cleveland Cavaliers ===
In 2007, the Cleveland Cavaliers hired Babcock as a scout. He served in that capacity for ten years, retiring in 2016 after the Cavaliers won the NBA championship. While with Cleveland, the National Cystic Fibrosis Foundation in Washington, DC, honored him with the Hitchcock Humanitarian Award for his community service during his NBA career.

He currently teaches as an adjunct professor at Emory University in Atlanta and was nominated to the 2023 class of the Naismith Basketball Hall of Fame.
