= Steve Holman (broadcaster) =

American sports broadcaster

Steve Holman (born March 5, 1954, in Lawrence, Massachusetts) is an American sports broadcaster, most noted for his work as the play-by-play radio broadcaster for the Atlanta Hawks of the National Basketball Association.

Holman began his NBA career in the early 1970s as a broadcast assistant to legendary Boston Celtics’ play-by-play voice Johnny Most. He first filled in for Most in 1976 when Most went hoarse during a game. His first radio job was at WCCM in Lawrence, where he was hired by station owner Curt Gowdy. He has since broadcast 2,648 consecutive games as of 2020.

Holman also covered the 1996 Olympic Games in Atlanta, calling radio play-by-play action for the United States men's and women's Gold Medal basketball teams, as well as boxing the only year the United States won gold.
