= 1986 NBA playoffs =

Postseason tournament

Tournament details
- Dates: April 17–June 8, 1986
- Season: 1985–86
- Teams: 16

Final positions
- Champions: Boston Celtics (16th title)
- Runners-up: Houston Rockets
- Semifinalists: Los Angeles Lakers; Milwaukee Bucks

Tournament statistics
- Scoring leader(s): Hakeem Olajuwon (Rockets) (26.9 PPG)

Awards
- MVP: Larry Bird (Celtics)

The 1986 NBA playoffs was the postseason tournament of the National Basketball Association's 1985–86 season. The tournament concluded with the Eastern Conference champion Boston Celtics defeating the Western Conference champion Houston Rockets 4 games to 2 in the NBA Finals. Larry Bird was named NBA Finals MVP for the second time.

This was the second NBA Finals meeting between the Celtics and Rockets; they met in the 1981 NBA Finals with the same result. It was the third of four straight Eastern Conference championships for Boston, who won 67 games that year, and went 40–1 at home. The Rockets, meanwhile had won just their second conference title in franchise history.

Second-year player Michael Jordan put on a record-setting performance in Game 2 of the Bulls' first-round series against the Celtics, scoring 63 points in a 2-OT loss, which surpassed Elgin Baylor's 61-point performance from the 1962 NBA Finals and still stands as the NBA Playoff scoring record. Jordan averaged 43.7 points per game in the series but was unable to prevent the Bulls from being swept by a more experienced, more talented Celtics team. The Bulls set a dubious mark by posting the second worst record for a playoff-qualifying team in history, going just 30–52 during the season. Game 2, where the record was set, was ranked by TV Guide as the 26th Most Memorable Moment in Television History, and is credited with boosting the NBA's popularity surge and eventual rise to near the top of the United States television sports market, trailing only football by the mid-90s.

The 1986 playoffs marked the third time in four years that the Milwaukee Bucks advanced to the Eastern Conference Finals, but it would be their last appearance in the series until 2001. The Celtics avenged their 1983 sweep by sweeping the Bucks in four games.

As for the Philadelphia 76ers, this was the last time they would play in a Game 7 until 2001. After their first round loss to the Atlanta Hawks, the Detroit Pistons would advance past the first round in each of the next five seasons (1987, 1988, 1989, 1990, 1991), which include all appearances in the conference finals, three NBA Finals, and two championships.

After moving from Kansas City, where the franchise played its previous thirteen seasons, the Sacramento Kings made their first postseason appearance in their first season in its new city.

== Bracket ==
First Round	Conference Semifinals
E1	Boston*	3
E8	Chicago	0
E1	Boston*	4
E4	Atlanta	1
E4	Atlanta	3
E5	Detroit	1
Eastern Conference
E3	Philadelphia	3
E6	Washington	2
E3	Philadelphia	3
E2	Milwaukee*	4
E2	Milwaukee*	3
E7	New Jersey	0
W1	LA Lakers*	3
W8	San Antonio	0
W1	LA Lakers*	4
W4	Dallas	2
W4	Dallas	3
W5	Utah	1
Western Conference
W3	Denver	3
W6	Portland	1
W3	Denver	2
W2	Houston*	4
W2	Houston*	3
W7	Sacramento	0

Conference Finals
E1	Boston*	4
E2	Milwaukee*	0
W1	LA Lakers*	1
W2	Houston*	4

NBA Finals
E1	Boston*	4
W2	Houston*	2

- * Division winner
- Bold Series winner
- Italic Team with home-court advantage

== First round ==
=== Eastern Conference first round ===
==== (1) Boston Celtics vs. (8) Chicago Bulls ====
April 17

Boxscore

Chicago Bulls 104, Boston Celtics 123
Scoring by quarter: 35–27, 24–34, 25–33, 20–29
Pts: Michael Jordan 49; Rebs: Charles Oakley 10; Asts: Macy, Paxson 4 each	Pts: Larry Bird 30; Rebs: McHale, Parish 10 each Asts: Larry Bird 8
Boston leads series, 1–0

Boston Garden, Boston, Massachusetts
Attendance: 14,890
Referees: Jack Madden, Paul Mihalak

April 20

Boxscore

Chicago Bulls 131, Boston Celtics 135 (2OT)
Scoring by quarter: 33–25, 25–26, 33–37, 25–28, Overtime: 9–9, 6–10
Pts: Michael Jordan 63; Rebs: Charles Oakley 14; Asts: Michael Jordan 6	Pts: Larry Bird 36; Rebs: McHale, Walton 15 each Asts: Bird, Johnson 8 each
Boston leads series, 2–0

Boston Garden, Boston, Massachusetts
Attendance: 14,890
Referees: Jake O'Donnell, Ed Middleton, Jack Nies

- Michael Jordan hits the game-tying free throws with no time left in regulation to force the first OT; Danny Ainge hits the game-tying lay-up with 12 seconds left in the first OT to force the second OT.
- Michael Jordan's 63 points scored is an NBA playoff record
- As it turned out, this was George Gervin's final NBA game, as he played in Europe for a few seasons afterwards.

April 22

Boxscore

Boston Celtics 122, Chicago Bulls 104
Scoring by quarter: 33–23, 33–29, 33–19, 23–33
Pts: Kevin McHale 31; Rebs: Bill Walton 9 Asts: Larry Bird 8	Pts: John Paxson 23; Rebs: Dave Corzine 15; Asts: Michael Jordan 9
Boston wins series, 3–0

Chicago Stadium, Chicago, Illinois
Attendance: 18,968
Referees: Lee Jones, Ed Rush

Regular-season series
Boston won 5–1 in the regular-season series

December 15, 1985

Recap

Chicago Bulls 104, Boston Celtics 109

Boston Garden, Boston

December 17, 1985

Recap

Boston Celtics 108, Chicago Bulls 116

Chicago Stadium, Chicago

January 30, 1986

Recap

Boston Celtics 101, Chicago Bulls 91

Chicago Stadium, Chicago

March 4, 1986

Recap

Boston Celtics 106, Chicago Bulls 94

Chicago Stadium, Chicago

March 5, 1986

Recap

Chicago Bulls 97, Boston Celtics 108

Boston Garden, Boston

March 21, 1986

Recap

Chicago Bulls 105, Boston Celtics 126

Boston Garden, Boston

This was the second playoff meeting between these two teams, with the Celtics winning the first meeting.

Previous playoff series
Boston leads 1–0 in all-time playoff series

1981

Boston Celtics 4, Chicago Bulls 0

1981 Eastern Conference Semifinals

==== (2) Milwaukee Bucks vs. (7) New Jersey Nets ====
April 18

Boxscore

New Jersey Nets 107, Milwaukee Bucks 119
Scoring by quarter: 29–34, 29–24, 26–28, 23–33
Pts: Buck Williams 27; Rebs: Buck Williams 14; Asts: Birdsong, Cook 7 each	Pts: Craig Hodges 25; Rebs: Alton Lister 10; Asts: Paul Pressey 10
Milwaukee leads series, 1–0

MECCA Arena, Milwaukee, Wisconsin
Attendance: 11,052
Referees: Earl Strom, Hue Hollins

April 20

Boxscore

New Jersey Nets 97, Milwaukee Bucks 111
Scoring by quarter: 23–26, 23–23, 25–36, 26–26
Pts: Mike Gminski 28; Rebs: Mike Gminski 13; Asts: Darwin Cook 7	Pts: Terry Cummings 28; Rebs: Terry Cummings 7 Asts: Paul Pressey 7
Milwaukee leads series, 2–0

MECCA Arena, Milwaukee, Wisconsin
Attendance: 11,052
Referees: Darrell Garretson, Dick Bavetta

April 22

Boxscore

Milwaukee Bucks 118, New Jersey Nets 113
Scoring by quarter: 24–36, 31–37, 36–22, 27–18
Pts: Terry Cummings 23; Rebs: Terry Cummings 11; Asts: Sidney Moncrief 5	Pts: Otis Birdsong 28; Rebs: Buck Williams 10; Asts: Kelvin Ransey 4
Milwaukee wins series, 3–0

Brendan Byrne Arena, East Rutherford, New Jersey
Attendance: 7,784
Referees: Hugh Evans, Ed Middleton, Dick Bavetta

Regular-season series
Milwaukee won 4–2 in the regular-season series

November 2, 1985

Recap

New Jersey Nets 113, Milwaukee Bucks 136

MECCA Arena, Milwaukee

November 9, 1985

Recap

Milwaukee Bucks 123, New Jersey Nets 126

Brendan Byrne Arena, East Rutherford, New Jersey

January 8, 1986

Recap

Milwaukee Bucks 99, New Jersey Nets 106

Brendan Byrne Arena, East Rutherford, New Jersey

February 15, 1986

Recap

New Jersey Nets 94, Milwaukee Bucks 112

MECCA Arena, Milwaukee

March 5, 1986

Recap

Milwaukee Bucks 119, New Jersey Nets 106

Brendan Byrne Arena, East Rutherford, New Jersey

March 25, 1986

Recap

New Jersey Nets 105, Milwaukee Bucks 118

MECCA Arena, Milwaukee

This was the second playoff meeting between these two teams, with the Bucks winning the first meeting.

Previous playoff series
Milwaukee leads 1–0 in all-time playoff series

1984

Milwaukee Bucks 4, New Jersey Nets 2

1984 Eastern Conference Semifinals

==== (3) Philadelphia 76ers vs. (6) Washington Bullets ====
April 18

Boxscore

Washington Bullets 95, Philadelphia 76ers 94
Scoring by quarter: 25–22, 19–23, 24–25, 27–24
Pts: Jeff Malone 21; Rebs: Cliff Robinson 8 Asts: Gus Williams 7	Pts: Charles Barkley 26; Rebs: Charles Barkley 22; Asts: Charles Barkley 9
Washington leads series, 1–0

Spectrum, Philadelphia, Pennsylvania
Attendance: 9,148
Referees: Jack Madden, Ed Middleton

- Dudley Bradley hits the game-winning 3 capping off a rally from 17 points down.

April 20

Boxscore

Washington Bullets 97, Philadelphia 76ers 102
Scoring by quarter: 26–22, 23–27, 30–26, 18–27
Pts: Jeff Malone 25; Rebs: Cliff Robinson 11; Asts: Gus Williams 12	Pts: Charles Barkley 27; Rebs: Charles Barkley 20; Asts: Charles Barkley 6
Series tied, 1–1

Spectrum, Philadelphia, Pennsylvania
Attendance: 9,057
Referees: Earl Strom, Hue Hollins

April 22

Boxscore

Philadelphia 76ers 91, Washington Bullets 86
Scoring by quarter: 26–27, 18–26, 22–18, 25–15
Pts: Julius Erving 22; Rebs: Charles Barkley 14; Asts: Julius Erving 6	Pts: Gus Williams 28; Rebs: Bol, Roundfield 10 each Asts: Williams, Roundfield 4 each
Philadelphia leads series, 2–1

Capital Centre, Landover, Maryland
Attendance: 17,137
Referees: Jess Kersey, Mike Mathis

April 24

Boxscore

Philadelphia 76ers 111, Washington Bullets 116
Scoring by quarter: 31–27, 27–33, 26–31, 27–25
Pts: Maurice Cheeks 30; Rebs: Charles Barkley 15; Asts: Charles Barkley 7	Pts: Cliff Robinson 31; Rebs: Manute Bol 12; Asts: Jeff Ruland 5
Series tied, 2–2

Capital Centre, Landover, Maryland
Attendance: 12,588
Referees: Hugh Evans, Joe Crawford

April 27

Boxscore

Washington Bullets 109, Philadelphia 76ers 134
Scoring by quarter: 22–40, 30–30, 33–27, 24–37
Pts: Cliff Robinson 30; Rebs: Cliff Robinson 11; Asts: Gus Williams 6	Pts: Terry Catledge 27; Rebs: Charles Barkley 15; Asts: Charles Barkley 12
Philadelphia wins series, 3–2

Spectrum, Philadelphia, Pennsylvania
Attendance: 15,162
Referees: Jake O'Donnell, Darrell Garretson

Regular-season series
Tied 3–3 in the regular-season series

November 16, 1985

Recap

Philadelphia 76ers 97, Washington Bullets 118

Capital Centre, Landover, Maryland

December 4, 1985

Recap

Washington Bullets 110, Philadelphia 76ers 115 (OT)

Spectrum, Philadelphia

February 21, 1986

Recap

Washington Bullets 87, Philadelphia 76ers 97

Spectrum, Philadelphia

March 21, 1986

Recap

Washington Bullets 105, Philadelphia 76ers 112

Spectrum, Philadelphia

March 24, 1986

Recap

Philadelphia 76ers 93, Washington Bullets 100

Capital Centre, Landover, Maryland

April 13, 1986

Recap

Philadelphia 76ers 97, Washington Bullets 98

Capital Centre, Landover, Maryland

This was the fifth playoff meeting between these two teams, with each team winning two of the first four meetings.

Previous playoff series
Tied 2–2 in all-time playoff series

1971

Philadelphia 76ers 3, Baltimore Bullets 4

1971 Eastern Conference Semifinals

1978

Philadelphia 76ers 2, Washington Bullets 4

1978 Eastern Conference Finals

1980

Philadelphia 76ers 2, Washington Bullets 0

1980 Eastern Conference First Round

1985

Philadelphia 76ers 3, Washington Bullets 1

1985 Eastern Conference First Round

==== (4) Atlanta Hawks vs. (5) Detroit Pistons ====
April 17

Boxscore

Detroit Pistons 122, Atlanta Hawks 140
Scoring by quarter: 34–30, 27–41, 29–32, 32–37
Pts: Bill Laimbeer 26; Rebs: Bill Laimbeer 17; Asts: Isiah Thomas 16	Pts: Dominique Wilkins 28; Rebs: Rollins, Levingston 8 each Asts: Doc Rivers 16
Atlanta leads series, 1–0

Omni Coliseum, Atlanta, Georgia
Attendance: 12,538
Referees: Jake O'Donnell, Dick Bavetta

April 19

Boxscore

Detroit Pistons 125, Atlanta Hawks 137
Scoring by quarter: 34–29, 32–39, 30–33, 29–36
Pts: Isiah Thomas 36; Rebs: Bill Laimbeer 12; Asts: Isiah Thomas 9	Pts: Dominique Wilkins 50; Rebs: Tree Rollins 14; Asts: Spud Webb 18
Atlanta leads series, 2–0

Omni Coliseum, Atlanta, Georgia
Attendance: 12,964
Referees: Ed Rush, Walter Rooney, Jim Capers

April 22

Boxscore

Atlanta Hawks 97, Detroit Pistons 106
Scoring by quarter: 24–33, 23–25, 21–26, 29–22
Pts: Dominique Wilkins 21; Rebs: Wilkins, Levingston 7 each Asts: Doc Rivers 8	Pts: Kelly Tripucka 33; Rebs: Bill Laimbeer 14; Asts: Isiah Thomas 11
Atlanta leads series, 2–1

Pontiac Silverdome, Pontiac, Michigan
Attendance: 13,312
Referees: Jack Madden, Joe Crawford

April 25

Boxscore

Atlanta Hawks 114, Detroit Pistons 113 (2OT)
Scoring by quarter: 25–28, 24–18, 24–26, 19–20, Overtime: 11–11, 11–10
Pts: Dominique Wilkins 38; Rebs: Doc Rivers 13; Asts: Doc Rivers 9	Pts: Isiah Thomas 30; Rebs: Bill Laimbeer 13; Asts: Isiah Thomas 12
Atlanta wins series, 3–1

Pontiac Silverdome, Pontiac, Michigan
Attendance: 15,288
Referees: Darell Garretson, Jess Kersey

Regular-season series
Atlanta won 4–2 in the regular-season series

November 15, 1985

Recap

Detroit Pistons 118, Atlanta Hawks 122

The Omni, Atlanta

January 3, 1986

Recap

Detroit Pistons 101, Atlanta Hawks 111

The Omni, Atlanta

January 9, 1986

Recap

Atlanta Hawks 110, Detroit Pistons 99

Pontiac Silverdome, Pontiac, Michigan

January 29, 1986

Recap

Atlanta Hawks 94, Detroit Pistons 107

Pontiac Silverdome, Pontiac, Michigan

January 31, 1986

Recap

Detroit Pistons 103, Atlanta Hawks 116

The Omni, Atlanta

February 28, 1986

Recap

Atlanta Hawks 103, Detroit Pistons 115

Pontiac Silverdome, Pontiac, Michigan

This was the fourth playoff meeting between these two teams, with the Hawks winning two of the first three meetings while in St. Louis.

Previous playoff series
Atlanta/ St. Louis leads 2–1 in all-time playoff series

1956

Fort Wayne Pistons 3, St. Louis Hawks 2

1956 Western Division Finals

1958

Detroit Pistons 1, St. Louis Hawks 4

1958 Western Division Finals

1963

Detroit Pistons 1, St. Louis Hawks 3

1963 Western Division Semifinals

=== Western Conference first round ===
==== (1) Los Angeles Lakers vs. (8) San Antonio Spurs ====
April 17

Boxscore

San Antonio Spurs 88, Los Angeles Lakers 135
Scoring by quarter: 23–33, 22–34, 31–30, 12–38
Pts: Mike Mitchell 24; Rebs: Mitchell, S. Johnson 4 each Asts: Wes Matthews 10	Pts: Byron Scott 24; Rebs: Kurt Rambis 8 Asts: Magic Johnson 18
LA Lakers lead series, 1–0

The Forum, Inglewood, California
Attendance: 17,505
Referees: Darell Garretson, Bill Oakes

April 19

Boxscore

San Antonio Spurs 94, Los Angeles Lakers 122
Scoring by quarter: 28–27, 21–26, 18–33, 27–36
Pts: Wes Matthews 30; Rebs: David Greenwood 7 Asts: Alvin Robertson 8	Pts: Magic Johnson 30; Rebs: Abdul-Jabbar, Lucas 10 each Asts: Magic Johnson 13
LA Lakers lead series, 2–0

The Forum, Inglewood, California
Attendance: 17,505
Referees: Lee Jones, Joe Crawford

April 23

Boxscore

Los Angeles Lakers 114, San Antonio Spurs 94
Scoring by quarter: 27–20, 29–28, 28–15, 30–31
Pts: Kareem Abdul-Jabbar 25; Rebs: Kurt Rambis 14; Asts: Magic Johnson 17	Pts: Wes Matthews 30; Rebs: Artis Gilmore 11; Asts: Wes Matthews 8
LA Lakers win series, 3–0

HemisFair Arena, San Antonio, Texas
Attendance: 7,918
Referees: Jake O'Donnell, Tommy Nunez Sr.

Regular-season series
Los Angeles won 4–1 in the regular-season series

October 26, 1985

Recap

Los Angeles Lakers 121, San Antonio Spurs 116 (2OT)

HemisFair Arena, San Antonio

November 24, 1985

Recap

San Antonio Spurs 102, Los Angeles Lakers 118

The Forum, Inglewood, California

December 26, 1985

Recap

Los Angeles Lakers 91, San Antonio Spurs 109

HemisFair Arena, San Antonio

March 21, 1986

Recap

Los Angeles Lakers 117, San Antonio Spurs 109

HemisFair Arena, San Antonio

March 24, 1986

Recap

San Antonio Spurs 102, Los Angeles Lakers 124

The Forum, Inglewood, California

This was the third playoff meeting between these two teams, with the Lakers winning the first two meetings.

Previous playoff series
Los Angeles leads 2–0 in all-time playoff series

1982

Los Angeles Lakers 4, San Antonio Spurs 0

1982 Western Conference Finals

1983

Los Angeles Lakers 4, San Antonio Spurs 2

1983 Western Conference Finals

==== (2) Houston Rockets vs. (7) Sacramento Kings ====
April 17

Boxscore

Sacramento Kings 87, Houston Rockets 107
Scoring by quarter: 22–31, 15–24, 25–26, 25–26
Pts: Reggie Theus 18; Rebs: LaSalle Thompson 17; Asts: Reggie Theus 4	Pts: Hakeem Olajuwon 29; Rebs: Hakeem Olajuwon 15; Asts: Rodney McCray 7
Houston leads series, 1–0

The Summit, Houston, Texas
Attendance: 15,101
Referees: Hugh Evans, Tommy Nunez Sr.

April 19

Boxscore

Sacramento Kings 103, Houston Rockets 111
Scoring by quarter: 21–34, 23–22, 26–30, 33–25
Pts: Reggie Theus 19; Rebs: LaSalle Thompson 10; Asts: Reggie Theus 7	Pts: Robert Reid 29; Rebs: Ralph Sampson 8 Asts: Reid, Sampson 6 each
Houston leads series, 2–0

The Summit, Houston, Texas
Attendance: 16,016
Referees: Mike Mathis, Jess Kersey

April 22

Boxscore

Houston Rockets 113, Sacramento Kings 98
Scoring by quarter: 23–26, 32–25, 32–22, 26–25
Pts: Lloyd, Sampson 25 each Rebs: Hakeem Olajuwon 13; Asts: Lloyd, McCray 7 each	Pts: Eddie Johnson 33; Rebs: three players 8 each Asts: Reggie Theus 8
Houston wins series, 3–0

ARCO Arena I, Sacramento, California
Attendance: 10,333
Referees: Darell Garretson, Paul Mihalak

Regular-season series
Houston won 4–2 in the regular-season series

October 31, 1985

Recap

Houston Rockets 116, Sacramento Kings 122

ARCO Arena I, Sacramento, California

November 30, 1985

Recap

Sacramento Kings 114, Houston Rockets 131

The Summit, Houston

January 23, 1986

Recap

Sacramento Kings 107, Houston Rockets 124

The Summit, Houston

January 30, 1986

Recap

Houston Rockets 111, Sacramento Kings 109

ARCO Arena I, Sacramento, California

February 18, 1986

Recap

Houston Rockets 105, Sacramento Kings 115

ARCO Arena I, Sacramento, California

March 6, 1986

Recap

Sacramento Kings 105, Houston Rockets 116

The Summit, Houston

This was the second playoff meeting between these two teams, with the Rockets winning the first meeting.

Previous playoff series
Houston leads 1–0 in all-time playoff series

1981

Houston Rockets 4, Kansas City Kings 1

1981 Western Conference Finals

==== (3) Denver Nuggets vs. (6) Portland Trail Blazers ====
April 18

Boxscore

Portland Trail Blazers 126, Denver Nuggets 133
Scoring by quarter: 28–28, 34–38, 33–36, 31–31
Pts: Kiki VanDeWeghe 28; Rebs: Kenny Carr 9 Asts: Steve Colter 6	Pts: Calvin Natt 40; Rebs: Danny Schayes 11; Asts: English, Lever 9 each
Denver leads series, 1–0

McNichols Sports Arena, Denver, Colorado
Attendance: 13,209
Referees: Mike Mathis, Jess Kersey

April 20

Boxscore

Portland Trail Blazers 108, Denver Nuggets 106
Scoring by quarter: 36–25, 18–21, 26–30, 28–30
Pts: Kiki VanDeWeghe 36; Rebs: Kenny Carr 11; Asts: Clyde Drexler 8	Pts: Alex English 24; Rebs: Blair Rasmussen 9 Asts: Alex English 10
Series tied, 1–1

McNichols Sports Arena, Denver, Colorado
Attendance: 11,724
Referees: Joe Crawford, Paul Mihalak

April 22

Boxscore

Denver Nuggets 115, Portland Trail Blazers 104
Scoring by quarter: 23–28, 26–22, 32–21, 34–33
Pts: Blair Rasmussen 15; Rebs: Calvin Natt 11; Asts: Fat Lever 5	Pts: Kiki VanDeWeghe 24; Rebs: Kenny Carr 15; Asts: Clyde Drexler 7
Denver leads series, 2–1

Memorial Coliseum, Portland, Oregon
Attendance: 12,666
Referees: Earl Strom, Bill Oakes

April 24

Boxscore

Denver Nuggets 116, Portland Trail Blazers 112
Scoring by quarter: 24–33, 28–30, 37–30, 27–19
Pts: Fat Lever 30; Rebs: T. R. Dunn 11; Asts: Alex English 8	Pts: Kiki VanDeWeghe 18; Rebs: Kenny Carr 18; Asts: Steve Colter 8
Denver wins series, 3–1

Memorial Coliseum, Portland, Oregon
Attendance: 12,666
Referees: Jack Madden, Hue Hollins

- This is the most recent playoff series between the Nuggets & Trail Blazers until 2019.

Regular-season series
Denver won 3–2 in the regular-season series

December 19, 1985

Recap

Portland Trail Blazers 118, Denver Nuggets 123

McNichols Sports Arena, Denver, Colorado

December 22, 1985

Recap

Denver Nuggets 114, Portland Trail Blazers 121

Memorial Coliseum, Portland, Oregon

February 4, 1986

Recap

Portland Trail Blazers 118, Denver Nuggets 119

McNichols Sports Arena, Denver, Colorado

February 24, 1986

Recap

Denver Nuggets 119, Portland Trail Blazers 113

Memorial Coliseum, Portland, Oregon

April 1, 1986

Recap

Denver Nuggets 110, Portland Trail Blazers 127

Memorial Coliseum, Portland, Oregon

This was the second playoff meeting between these two teams, with the Trail Blazers winning the first meeting.

Previous playoff series
Portland leads 1–0 in all-time playoff series

1977

Denver Nuggets 2, Portland Trail Blazers 4

1977 Western Conference Semifinals

==== (4) Dallas Mavericks vs. (5) Utah Jazz ====
April 18

Boxscore

Utah Jazz 93, Dallas Mavericks 101
Scoring by quarter: 25–26, 30–34, 24–25, 14–16
Pts: Karl Malone 23; Rebs: Karl Malone 13; Asts: Rickey Green 12	Pts: Rolando Blackman 25; Rebs: Sam Perkins 15; Asts: Derek Harper 7
Dallas leads series, 1–0

Reunion Arena, Dallas, Texas
Attendance: 17,007
Referees: Hugh Evans, Tommy Nunez Sr.

April 20

Boxscore

Utah Jazz 106, Dallas Mavericks 113
Scoring by quarter: 28–31, 29–32, 28–27, 21–23
Pts: Karl Malone 31; Rebs: Mark Eaton 11; Asts: Rickey Green 8	Pts: Mark Aguirre 27; Rebs: Sam Perkins 10; Asts: Aguirre, Harper 5 each
Dallas leads series, 2–0

Reunion Arena, Dallas, Texas
Attendance: 17,007
Referees: Ed Rush, Lee Jones

April 23

Boxscore

Dallas Mavericks 98, Utah Jazz 100
Scoring by quarter: 23–29, 24–22, 31–25, 20–24
Pts: James Donaldson 17; Rebs: James Donaldson 20; Asts: Derek Harper 6	Pts: Rickey Green 32; Rebs: Thurl Bailey 14; Asts: Rickey Green 8
Dallas leads series, 2–1

Salt Palace, Salt Lake City, Utah
Attendance: 11,635
Referees: Earl Strom, Hue Hollins

April 25

Boxscore

Dallas Mavericks 117, Utah Jazz 113
Scoring by quarter: 24–29, 31–25, 29–26, 33–33
Pts: Sam Perkins 29; Rebs: Sam Perkins 12; Asts: Mark Aguirre 8	Pts: Thurl Bailey 24; Rebs: Mark Eaton 12; Asts: Rickey Green 10
Dallas wins series, 3–1

Salt Palace, Salt Lake City, Utah
Attendance: 12,683
Referees: Mike Mathis, Jack Madden

Regular-season series
Dallas won 5–1 in the regular-season series

November 13, 1985

Recap

Dallas Mavericks 115, Utah Jazz 100

Salt Palace, Salt Lake City

January 4, 1986

Recap

Utah Jazz 106, Dallas Mavericks 119

Reunion Arena, Dallas

January 17, 1986

Recap

Dallas Mavericks 112, Utah Jazz 139

Salt Palace, Salt Lake City

February 2, 1986

Recap

Utah Jazz 97, Dallas Mavericks 100

Reunion Arena, Dallas

March 15, 1986

Recap

Utah Jazz 98, Dallas Mavericks 108

Reunion Arena, Dallas

March 20, 1986

Recap

Dallas Mavericks 114, Utah Jazz 107

Salt Palace, Salt Lake City

This was the first playoff meeting between the Jazz and the Mavericks.

== Conference semifinals ==
=== Eastern Conference semifinals ===
==== (1) Boston Celtics vs. (4) Atlanta Hawks ====
April 27

Boxscore

Atlanta Hawks 91, Boston Celtics 103
Scoring by quarter: 23–30, 23–22, 17–34, 28–17
Pts: Kevin Willis 18; Rebs: Kevin Willis 8 Asts: Spud Webb 5	Pts: Kevin McHale 24; Rebs: Larry Bird 12; Asts: Dennis Johnson 14
Boston leads series, 1–0

Boston Garden, Boston, Massachusetts
Attendance: 14,890
Referees: Hugh Evans, Mike Mathis

April 29

Boxscore

Atlanta Hawks 108, Boston Celtics 119
Scoring by quarter: 31–36, 20–29, 31–29, 26–25
Pts: Kevin Willis 23; Rebs: Willis, Rollins 10 each Asts: Doc Rivers 7	Pts: Larry Bird 36; Rebs: Kevin McHale 9 Asts: Dennis Johnson 9
Boston leads series, 2–0

Boston Garden, Boston, Massachusetts
Attendance: 14,890
Referees: Earl Strom, Bill Oakes

May 2

Boxscore

Boston Celtics 111, Atlanta Hawks 107
Scoring by quarter: 34–31, 30–29, 24–27, 23–20
Pts: Larry Bird 28; Rebs: Robert Parish 14; Asts: Larry Bird 12	Pts: Dominique Wilkins 38; Rebs: Kevin Willis 12; Asts: Doc Rivers 14
Boston leads series, 3–0

Omni Coliseum, Atlanta, Georgia
Attendance: 12,357
Referees: Jake O'Donnell, Joe Crawford, Tommy Nunez Sr.

May 4

Boxscore

Boston Celtics 94, Atlanta Hawks 106
Scoring by quarter: 24–29, 27–21, 23–29, 20–27
Pts: Kevin McHale 26; Rebs: Kevin McHale 12; Asts: Larry Bird 5	Pts: Dominique Wilkins 37; Rebs: Tree Rollins 16; Asts: Spud Webb 12
Boston leads series, 3–1

Omni Coliseum, Atlanta, Georgia
Attendance: 12,357
Referees: Darrell Garretson, Paul Mihalak

May 6

Boxscore

Atlanta Hawks 99, Boston Celtics 132
Scoring by quarter: 27–32, 28–34, 6–36, 38–30
Pts: Spud Webb 15; Rebs: Tree Rollins 8 Asts: Spud Webb 8	Pts: Larry Bird 36; Rebs: Robert Parish 13; Asts: Dennis Johnson 8
Boston wins series, 4–1

Boston Garden, Boston, Massachusetts
Attendance: 14,890
Referees: Jack Madden, Ed Middleton

- Hawks only scored 1 field goal in the third quarter.

Regular-season series
Boston won 6–0 in the regular-season series

November 1, 1985

Recap

Atlanta Hawks 105, Boston Celtics 109

Boston Garden, Boston

November 30, 1985

Recap

Boston Celtics 102, Atlanta Hawks 97

The Omni, Atlanta

December 10, 1985

Recap

Atlanta Hawks 110, Boston Celtics 114

Hartford Civic Center, Hartford, Connecticut

January 10, 1986

Recap

Atlanta Hawks 108, Boston Celtics 115

Boston Garden, Boston

January 18, 1986

Recap

Boston Celtics 125, Atlanta Hawks 122 (OT)

The Omni, Atlanta

March 14, 1986

Recap

Boston Celtics 121, Atlanta Hawks 114

The Omni, Atlanta

This was the eighth playoff meeting between these two teams, with the Celtics winning six of the first seven meetings.

Previous playoff series
Boston leads 6–1 in all-time playoff series

1957

Boston Celtics 4, St. Louis Hawks 3

1957 NBA Finals

1958

Boston Celtics 2, St. Louis Hawks 4

1958 NBA Finals

1960

Boston Celtics 4, St. Louis Hawks 3

1960 NBA Finals

1961

Boston Celtics 4, St. Louis Hawks 1

1961 NBA Finals

1972

Atlanta Hawks 2, Boston Celtics 4

1972 Eastern Conference Semifinals

1973

Atlanta Hawks 2, Boston Celtics 4

1973 Eastern Conference Semifinals

1983

Atlanta Hawks 1, Boston Celtics 2

1983 Eastern Conference First Round

==== (2) Milwaukee Bucks vs. (3) Philadelphia 76ers ====
April 29

Boxscore

Philadelphia 76ers 118, Milwaukee Bucks 112
Scoring by quarter: 29–32, 24–33, 35–28, 30–19
Pts: Charles Barkley 31; Rebs: Charles Barkley 20; Asts: Cheeks, Threatt 7 each	Pts: Terry Cummings 23; Rebs: Terry Cummings 7 Asts: Paul Pressey 13
Philadelphia leads series, 1–0

MECCA Arena, Milwaukee, Wisconsin
Attendance: 11,052
Referees: Ed Rush, Lee Jones

May 1

Boxscore

Philadelphia 76ers 107, Milwaukee Bucks 119
Scoring by quarter: 23–30, 32–31, 21–30, 31–28
Pts: Charles Barkley 26; Rebs: Charles Barkley 15; Asts: Maurice Cheeks 8	Pts: Terry Cummings 30; Rebs: Terry Cummings 15; Asts: Paul Pressey 7
Series tied, 1–1

MECCA Arena, Milwaukee, Wisconsin
Attendance: 11,052
Referees: Jack Madden, Hue Hollins

May 3

Boxscore

Milwaukee Bucks 103, Philadelphia 76ers 107
Scoring by quarter: 27–18, 20–35, 26–26, 30–28
Pts: Terry Cummings 27; Rebs: Cummings, Lister 9 each Asts: Paul Pressey 9	Pts: Charles Barkley 29; Rebs: Charles Barkley 13; Asts: Maurice Cheeks 10
Philadelphia leads series, 2–1

Spectrum, Philadelphia, Pennsylvania
Attendance: 14,611
Referees: Mike Mathis, Jess Kersey

May 5

Boxscore

Milwaukee Bucks 109, Philadelphia 76ers 104
Scoring by quarter: 27–27, 33–33, 24–20, 25–24
Pts: Cummings, Pierce 19 each Rebs: Terry Cummings 13; Asts: three players 4 each	Pts: Charles Barkley 37; Rebs: Charles Barkley 14; Asts: Maurice Cheeks 10
Series tied, 2–2

Spectrum, Philadelphia, Pennsylvania
Attendance: 17,941
Referees: Jake O'Donnell, Joe Crawford

May 7

Boxscore

Philadelphia 76ers 108, Milwaukee Bucks 113
Scoring by quarter: 26–33, 28–27, 30–26, 24–27
Pts: Charles Barkley 29; Rebs: Clemon Johnson 9 Asts: Barkley, Erving 5 each	Pts: Pressey, Cummings 23 each Rebs: Terry Cummings 11; Asts: Paul Pressey 16
Milwaukee leads series, 3–2

MECCA Arena, Milwaukee, Wisconsin
Attendance: 11,052
Referees: Paul Mihalak, Hugh Evans

May 9

Boxscore

Milwaukee Bucks 108, Philadelphia 76ers 126
Scoring by quarter: 28–35, 26–27, 21–32, 33–32
Pts: Craig Hodges 22; Rebs: Alton Lister 10; Asts: Terry Cummings 5	Pts: Jones, Barkley 23 each Rebs: Charles Barkley 21; Asts: Maurice Cheeks 13
Series tied, 3–3

Spectrum, Philadelphia, Pennsylvania
Attendance: 15,287
Referees: Ed Rush, Darell Garretson

May 11

Boxscore

Philadelphia 76ers 112, Milwaukee Bucks 113
Scoring by quarter: 32–30, 26–33, 28–27, 26–23
Pts: Sedale Threatt 28; Rebs: Charles Barkley 12; Asts: Maurice Cheeks 6	Pts: Terry Cummings 27; Rebs: Terry Cummings 8 Asts: Paul Pressey 15
Milwaukee wins series, 4–3

MECCA Arena, Milwaukee, Wisconsin
Attendance: 11,052
Referees: Jake O'Donnell, Jack Madden

- Charles Barkley's goaltending on Craig Hodges with 29 seconds left; Bob McAdoo's and Bobby Jones' final NBA game.

Regular-season series
Milwaukee won 4–1 in the regular-season series

October 29, 1985

Recap

Philadelphia 76ers 117, Milwaukee Bucks 119

MECCA Arena, Milwaukee

November 10, 1985

Recap

Milwaukee Bucks 97, Philadelphia 76ers 105

Spectrum, Philadelphia

February 17, 1986

Recap

Milwaukee Bucks 111, Philadelphia 76ers 106

Spectrum, Philadelphia

March 7, 1986

Recap

Philadelphia 76ers 95, Milwaukee Bucks 125

MECCA Arena, Milwaukee

March 28, 1986

Recap

Milwaukee Bucks 116, Philadelphia 76ers 94

Spectrum, Philadelphia

This was the sixth playoff meeting between these two teams, with the 76ers winning four of the first five meetings.

Previous playoff series
Philadelphia leads 4–1 in all-time playoff series

1970

Milwaukee Bucks 4, Philadelphia 76ers 1

1970 Eastern Division Semifinals

1981

Milwaukee Bucks 3, Philadelphia 76ers 4

1981 Eastern Conference Semifinals

1982

Milwaukee Bucks 2, Philadelphia 76ers 4

1982 Eastern Conference Semifinals

1983

Milwaukee Bucks 1, Philadelphia 76ers 4

1983 Eastern Conference Finals

1985

Milwaukee Bucks 0, Philadelphia 76ers 4

1985 Eastern Conference Semifinals

=== Western Conference semifinals ===
==== (1) Los Angeles Lakers vs. (4) Dallas Mavericks ====
April 27

Boxscore

Dallas Mavericks 116, Los Angeles Lakers 130
Scoring by quarter: 17–30, 31–36, 32–29, 36–35
Pts: Jay Vincent 18; Rebs: James Donaldson 10; Asts: Derek Harper 9	Pts: Kareem Abdul-Jabbar 28; Rebs: Maurice Lucas 8 Asts: Magic Johnson 14
LA Lakers lead series, 1–0

The Forum, Inglewood, California
Attendance: 17,505
Referees: Ed Rush, Ed Middleton

April 30

Boxscore

Dallas Mavericks 113, Los Angeles Lakers 117
Scoring by quarter: 30–27, 33–29, 24–28, 26–33
Pts: Mark Aguirre 28; Rebs: Mark Aguirre 12; Asts: Derek Harper 16	Pts: Kareem Abdul-Jabbar 26; Rebs: Maurice Lucas 11; Asts: Magic Johnson 9
LA Lakers lead series, 2–0

The Forum, Inglewood, California
Attendance: 17,505
Referees: Hugh Evans, Paul Mihalak

May 2

Boxscore

Los Angeles Lakers 108, Dallas Mavericks 110
Scoring by quarter: 23–26, 32–24, 28–31, 25–29
Pts: Kareem Abdul-Jabbar 28; Rebs: Kareem Abdul-Jabbar 12; Asts: Magic Johnson 14	Pts: Mark Aguirre 27; Rebs: James Donaldson 14; Asts: Mark Aguirre 8
LA Lakers lead series, 2–1

Reunion Arena, Dallas, Texas
Attendance: 17,007
Referees: Jack Madden, Hue Hollins

- Derek Harper redeemed himself from his 1984 mistake by hitting the game-winning 3 with 3 seconds left.

May 4

Boxscore

Los Angeles Lakers 118, Dallas Mavericks 120
Scoring by quarter: 33–45, 25–22, 29–31, 31–22
Pts: Kareem Abdul-Jabbar 33; Rebs: Magic Johnson 15; Asts: Magic Johnson 14	Pts: Mark Aguirre 39; Rebs: James Donaldson 11; Asts: Derek Harper 11
Series tied, 2–2

Reunion Arena, Dallas, Texas
Attendance: 17,007
Referees: Jake O'Donnell, Lee Jones

May 6

Boxscore

Dallas Mavericks 113, Los Angeles Lakers 116
Scoring by quarter: 25–29, 26–25, 28–30, 34–32
Pts: Mark Aguirre 27; Rebs: James Donaldson 8 Asts: Derek Harper 9	Pts: Kareem Abdul-Jabbar 34; Rebs: Kurt Rambis 10; Asts: Magic Johnson 14
LA Lakers lead series, 3–2

The Forum, Inglewood, California
Attendance: 17,505
Referees: Jess Kersey, Mike Mathis

May 8

Boxscore

Los Angeles Lakers 120, Dallas Mavericks 107
Scoring by quarter: 33–28, 36–23, 19–30, 32–26
Pts: Kareem Abdul-Jabbar 27; Rebs: Maurice Lucas 8 Asts: Magic Johnson 17	Pts: Mark Aguirre 28; Rebs: James Donaldson 18; Asts: Rolando Blackman 8
LA Lakers win series, 4–2

Reunion Arena, Dallas, Texas
Attendance: 17,007
Referees: Ed Rush, Joe Crawford

Regular-season series
Los Angeles won 4–1 in the regular-season series

October 29, 1985

Recap

Los Angeles Lakers 133, Dallas Mavericks 115

Reunion Arena, Dallas

December 8, 1985

Recap

Dallas Mavericks 119, Los Angeles Lakers 125

The Forum, Inglewood, California

February 4, 1986

Recap

Dallas Mavericks 102, Los Angeles Lakers 110

The Forum, Inglewood, California

February 26, 1986

Recap

Los Angeles Lakers 119, Dallas Mavericks 116

Reunion Arena, Dallas

April 13, 1986

Recap

Dallas Mavericks 127, Los Angeles Lakers 104

The Forum, Inglewood, California

This was the second playoff meeting between these two teams, with the Lakers winning the first meeting.

Previous playoff series
Los Angeles leads 1–0 in all-time playoff series

1984

Dallas Mavericks 1, Los Angeles Lakers 4

1984 Western Conference Semifinals

==== (2) Houston Rockets vs. (3) Denver Nuggets ====
April 26

Boxscore

Denver Nuggets 119, Houston Rockets 126
Scoring by quarter: 32–32, 29–23, 30–39, 28–32
Pts: Alex English 34; Rebs: Schayes, Natt 7 each Asts: English, Lever 9 each	Pts: Hakeem Olajuwon 38; Rebs: Hakeem Olajuwon 16; Asts: Robert Reid 9
Houston leads series, 1–0

The Summit, Houston, Texas
Attendance: 15,448
Referees: Jake O'Donnell, Ed Middleton

April 29

Boxscore

Denver Nuggets 101, Houston Rockets 119
Scoring by quarter: 22–26, 21–27, 28–35, 30–31
Pts: Blair Rasmussen 18; Rebs: Wayne Cooper 9 Asts: Mike Evans 7	Pts: Ralph Sampson 27; Rebs: Hakeem Olajuwon 14; Asts: Rodney McCray 10
Houston leads series, 2–0

The Summit, Houston, Texas
Attendance: 16,016
Referees: Joe Crawford, Jess Kersey

May 2

Boxscore

Houston Rockets 115, Denver Nuggets 116
Scoring by quarter: 29–30, 29–33, 29–34, 28–19
Pts: Hakeem Olajuwon 31; Rebs: Hakeem Olajuwon 11; Asts: McCray, Lloyd 8 each	Pts: Alex English 33; Rebs: Danny Schayes 8 Asts: Alex English 5
Houston leads series, 2–1

McNichols Sports Arena, Denver, Colorado
Attendance: 17,022
Referees: Hugh Evans, Paul Mihalak

May 4

Boxscore

Houston Rockets 111, Denver Nuggets 114 (OT)
Scoring by quarter: 32–27, 19–24, 29–23, 24–30, Overtime: 7–10
Pts: Ralph Sampson 28; Rebs: Ralph Sampson 13; Asts: Robert Reid 7	Pts: Alex English 28; Rebs: Wayne Cooper 9 Asts: Turner, Hanzlik 5 each
Series tied, 2–2

McNichols Sports Arena, Denver, Colorado
Attendance: 14,152
Referees: Hue Hollins, Ed Rush

May 6

Boxscore

Denver Nuggets 103, Houston Rockets 131
Scoring by quarter: 26–32, 20–40, 38–32, 19–27
Pts: Alex English 27; Rebs: Blair Rasmussen 12; Asts: Fat Lever 4	Pts: Hakeem Olajuwon 36; Rebs: Hakeem Olajuwon 19; Asts: Robert Reid 12
Houston leads series, 3–2

The Summit, Houston, Texas
Attendance: 16,016
Referees: Darell Garretson, Lee Jones

May 8

Boxscore

Houston Rockets 126, Denver Nuggets 122 (2OT)
Scoring by quarter: 21–33, 25–24, 31–24, 31–27, Overtime: 8–8, 10–6
Pts: Hakeem Olajuwon 28; Rebs: Ralph Sampson 18; Asts: Rodney McCray 7	Pts: Alex English 42; Rebs: Danny Schayes 14; Asts: Fat Lever 7
Houston wins series, 4–2

McNichols Sports Arena, Denver, Colorado
Attendance: 17,022
Referees: Mike Mathis, Jack Madden

Regular-season series
Tied 3–3 in the regular-season series

November 12, 1985

Recap

Denver Nuggets 119, Houston Rockets 127

The Summit, Houston

November 19, 1985

Recap

Houston Rockets 113, Denver Nuggets 127

McNichols Sports Arena, Denver

December 30, 1985

Recap

Houston Rockets 122, Denver Nuggets 125

McNichols Sports Arena, Denver

February 3, 1986

Recap

Denver Nuggets 102, Houston Rockets 104

The Summit, Houston

February 27, 1986

Recap

Denver Nuggets 111, Houston Rockets 117

The Summit, Houston

March 4, 1986

Recap

Houston Rockets 115, Denver Nuggets 128

McNichols Sports Arena, Denver

This was the first playoff meeting between the Nuggets and the Rockets.

== Conference finals ==
=== Eastern Conference finals ===
==== (1) Boston Celtics vs. (2) Milwaukee Bucks ====
May 13

Boxscore

Milwaukee Bucks 96, Boston Celtics 128
Scoring by quarter: 12–29, 26–31, 30–33, 28–35
Pts: Kenny Fields 18; Rebs: Terry Cummings 11; Asts: three players 3 each	Pts: Larry Bird 26; Rebs: Danny Ainge 10; Asts: Jerry Sichting 8
Boston leads series, 1–0

Boston Garden, Boston, Massachusetts
Attendance: 14,890
Referees: Mike Mathis, Jess Kersey

May 15

Boxscore

Milwaukee Bucks 111, Boston Celtics 122
Scoring by quarter: 29–36, 26–27, 25–26, 31–33
Pts: Terry Cummings 23; Rebs: Alton Lister 7 Asts: Paul Pressey 9	Pts: Larry Bird 26; Rebs: Robert Parish 9 Asts: Larry Bird 9
Boston leads series, 2–0

Boston Garden, Boston, Massachusetts
Attendance: 14,890
Referees: Darell Garretson, Lee Jones

May 17

Boxscore

Boston Celtics 111, Milwaukee Bucks 107
Scoring by quarter: 32–35, 21–25, 29–27, 29–20
Pts: Kevin McHale 29; Rebs: Larry Bird 16; Asts: Larry Bird 13	Pts: Terry Cummings 27; Rebs: Terry Cummings 18; Asts: Paul Pressey 9
Boston leads series, 3–0

MECCA Arena, Milwaukee, Wisconsin
Attendance: 11,052
Referees: Jake O'Donnell, Ed Middleton

May 18

Boxscore

Boston Celtics 111, Milwaukee Bucks 98
Scoring by quarter: 25–28, 37–30, 17–24, 32–16
Pts: Larry Bird 30; Rebs: Kevin McHale 11; Asts: Ainge, Bird 5 each	Pts: Sidney Moncrief 27; Rebs: Alton Lister 12; Asts: Sidney Moncrief 8
Boston wins series, 4–0

MECCA Arena, Milwaukee, Wisconsin
Attendance: 11,052
Referees: Ed Rush, Joe Crawford

Regular-season series
Boston won 5–0 in the regular-season series

October 30, 1985

Recap

Milwaukee Bucks 106, Boston Celtics 117

Boston Garden, Boston

December 3, 1985

Recap

Boston Celtics 112, Milwaukee Bucks 109

MECCA Arena, Milwaukee

February 4, 1986

Recap

Boston Celtics 112, Milwaukee Bucks 93

MECCA Arena, Milwaukee

March 26, 1986

Recap

Milwaukee Bucks 115, Boston Celtics 121

Boston Garden, Boston

April 8, 1986

Recap

Boston Celtics 126, Milwaukee Bucks 114

MECCA Arena, Milwaukee

This was the fourth playoff meeting between these two teams, with the Celtics winning two of the first three meetings.

Previous playoff series
Boston leads 2–1 in all-time playoff series

1974

Boston Celtics 4, Milwaukee Bucks 3

1974 NBA Finals

1983

Boston Celtics 0, Milwaukee Bucks 4

1983 Eastern Conference Semifinals

1984

Boston Celtics 4, Milwaukee Bucks 1

1984 Eastern Conference Finals

=== Western Conference finals ===
==== (1) Los Angeles Lakers vs. (2) Houston Rockets ====
May 10

Boxscore

Houston Rockets 107, Los Angeles Lakers 119
Scoring by quarter: 32–34, 26–30, 24–30, 25–25
Pts: Hakeem Olajuwon 28; Rebs: Hakeem Olajuwon 16; Asts: Robert Reid 8	Pts: Kareem Abdul-Jabbar 31; Rebs: Johnson, Lucas 7 each Asts: Magic Johnson 18
LA Lakers lead series, 1–0

The Forum, Inglewood, California
Attendance: 17,505
Referees: Hue Hollins, Hugh Evans

May 13

Boxscore

Houston Rockets 112, Los Angeles Lakers 102
Scoring by quarter: 18–25, 36–28, 33–24, 25–25
Pts: Sampson, Lloyd 24 each Rebs: Ralph Sampson 16; Asts: Rodney McCray 11	Pts: Magic Johnson 24; Rebs: Kurt Rambis 9 Asts: Magic Johnson 19
Series tied, 1–1

The Forum, Inglewood, California
Attendance: 17,505
Referees: Jake O'Donnell, Paul Mihalak

May 16

Boxscore

Los Angeles Lakers 109, Houston Rockets 117
Scoring by quarter: 38–37, 21–23, 32–30, 18–27
Pts: Kareem Abdul-Jabbar 33; Rebs: Johnson, Lucas 8 each Asts: Magic Johnson 20	Pts: Hakeem Olajuwon 40; Rebs: Hakeem Olajuwon 12; Asts: Robert Reid 12
Houston leads series, 2–1

The Summit, Houston, Texas
Attendance: 16,016
Referees: Jack Madden, Joe Crawford, Mike Mathis

May 18

Boxscore

Los Angeles Lakers 95, Houston Rockets 105
Scoring by quarter: 29–32, 24–18, 26–30, 16–25
Pts: James Worthy 26; Rebs: Magic Johnson 12; Asts: Magic Johnson 11	Pts: Hakeem Olajuwon 35; Rebs: Jim Petersen 13; Asts: Rodney McCray 6
Houston leads series, 3–1

The Summit, Houston, Texas
Attendance: 16,016
Referees: Darell Garretson, Mike Mathis, Lee Jones

May 21

Boxscore

Houston Rockets 114, Los Angeles Lakers 112
Scoring by quarter: 23–35, 31–26, 31–26, 29–25
Pts: Hakeem Olajuwon 30; Rebs: Hakeem Olajuwon 7 Asts: Rodney McCray 11	Pts: Kareem Abdul-Jabbar 26; Rebs: Kareem Abdul-Jabbar 13; Asts: Magic Johnson 13
Houston wins series, 4–1

The Forum, Inglewood, California
Attendance: 17,505
Referees: Earl Strom, Jess Kersey

- Ralph Sampson hits the famous off-balanced series winner at the buzzer; Hakeem Olajuwon was ejected in the fourth quarter for fighting Lakers forward Mitch Kupchak.

Regular-season series
Los Angeles won 4–1 in the regular-season series

December 6, 1985

Recap

Houston Rockets 112, Los Angeles Lakers 120

The Forum, Inglewood, California

February 6, 1986

Recap

Los Angeles Lakers 117, Houston Rockets 95

The Summit, Houston

March 16, 1986

Recap

Houston Rockets 111, Los Angeles Lakers 116

The Forum, Inglewood, California

April 6, 1986

Recap

Los Angeles Lakers 103, Houston Rockets 109

The Summit, Houston

April 10, 1986

Recap

Houston Rockets 113, Los Angeles Lakers 117

The Forum, Inglewood, California

This was the second playoff meeting between these two teams, with the Rockets winning the first meeting.

Previous playoff series
Houston leads 1–0 in all-time playoff series

1981

Houston Rockets 2, Los Angeles Lakers 1

1981 Western Conference First Round

== NBA Finals: (E1) Boston Celtics vs. (W2) Houston Rockets ==
May 26

Boxscore

Houston Rockets 100, Boston Celtics 112
Scoring by quarter: 28–34, 31–27, 17–30, 24–21
Pts: Hakeem Olajuwon 33; Rebs: Hakeem Olajuwon 12; Asts: Robert Reid 8	Pts: Robert Parish 23; Rebs: Dennis Johnson 11; Asts: Larry Bird 13
Boston leads series, 1–0

Boston Garden, Boston, Massachusetts
Attendance: 14,890
Referees: Ed T. Rush, Jack Madden

May 29

Boxscore

Houston Rockets 95, Boston Celtics 117
Scoring by quarter: 30–31, 20–29, 19–34, 26–23
Pts: Hakeem Olajuwon 21; Rebs: Hakeem Olajuwon 10; Asts: McCray, Reid 5 each	Pts: Larry Bird 31; Rebs: Larry Bird 8 Asts: Larry Bird 7
Boston leads series, 2–0

Boston Garden, Boston, Massachusetts
Attendance: 14,890
Referees: Jess Kersey, Hugh Evans

June 1

Boxscore

Boston Celtics 104, Houston Rockets 106
Scoring by quarter: 29–33, 30–29, 25–18, 20–26
Pts: Kevin McHale 28; Rebs: Larry Bird 15; Asts: Larry Bird 11	Pts: Ralph Sampson 24; Rebs: Ralph Sampson 22; Asts: Robert Reid 9
Boston leads series, 2–1

The Summit, Houston, Texas
Attendance: 16,016
Referees: Joe Crawford, Jake O'Donnell

June 3

Boxscore

Boston Celtics 106, Houston Rockets 103
Scoring by quarter: 30–30, 33–34, 23–21, 20–18
Pts: Robert Parish 22; Rebs: Robert Parish 15; Asts: Larry Bird 10	Pts: Ralph Sampson 25; Rebs: Hakeem Olajuwon 14; Asts: Ralph Sampson 9
Boston leads series, 3–1

The Summit, Houston, Texas
Attendance: 16,016
Referees: Darell Garretson, Earl Strom

June 5

Boxscore

Boston Celtics 96, Houston Rockets 111
Scoring by quarter: 28–26, 19–32, 18–28, 31–25
Pts: Kevin McHale 33; Rebs: Kevin McHale 8 Asts: Danny Ainge 5	Pts: Hakeem Olajuwon 32; Rebs: Hakeem Olajuwon 14; Asts: Robert Reid 17
Boston leads series, 3–2

The Summit, Houston, Texas
Attendance: 16,016
Referees: Hugh Evans, Jack Madden

June 8

Boxscore

Houston Rockets 97, Boston Celtics 114
Scoring by quarter: 23–29, 15–26, 23–27, 36–32
Pts: Hakeem Olajuwon 21; Rebs: Hakeem Olajuwon 10; Asts: McCray, Reid 5 each	Pts: Larry Bird 29; Rebs: Larry Bird 11; Asts: Larry Bird 12
Boston wins series, 4–2

Boston Garden, Boston, Massachusetts
Attendance: 14,890
Referees: Jake O'Donnell, Darrell Garretson

Regular-season series
Boston won 2–0 in the regular-season series

March 11, 1986

Recap

Boston Celtics 116, Houston Rockets 104

The Summit, Houston

March 24, 1986

Recap

Houston Rockets 107, Boston Celtics 114

Boston Garden, Boston

This was the fourth playoff meeting between these two teams, with the Celtics winning the first three meetings.

Previous playoff series
Boston leads 3–0 in all-time playoff series

1975

Boston Celtics 4, Houston Rockets 1

1975 Eastern Conference Semifinals

1980

Boston Celtics 4, Houston Rockets 0

1980 Eastern Conference Semifinals

1981

Boston Celtics 4, Houston Rockets 2

1981 NBA Finals

== Statistical leaders ==
Category	Game high			Average			
Category	Player	Team	High	Player	Team	Avg.	GP
Points	Michael Jordan	Chicago Bulls	63	Michael Jordan	Chicago Bulls	43.7	3
Rebounds	Ralph Sampson; Charles Barkley	Houston Rockets; Philadelphia 76ers	22	Charles Barkley	Philadelphia 76ers	15.8	12
Assists	Magic Johnson	Los Angeles Lakers	20	Magic Johnson	Los Angeles Lakers	15.1	14
Steals	Craig Hodges	Milwaukee Bucks	8	Artis Gilmore; Michael Jordan; Alvin Robertson	San Antonio Spurs; Chicago Bulls; San Antonio Spurs	2.3	3
Blocks	Manute Bol	Washington Bullets	9	Manute Bol	Washington Bullets	5.8	5
