= Yvon Joseph =

Haitian basketball player (born 1957)

Personal information
- Born: October 31, 1957 (age 69) Cap-Haïtien, Haiti
- Listed height: 6 ft 11 in (2.11 m)
- Listed weight: 245 lb (111 kg)

Career information
- High school: Collège Notre-Dame (Cap-Haïtien, Haiti)
- College: Miami Dade (1980–1982); Georgia Tech (1982–1985)
- NBA draft: 1985: 2nd round, 36th overall pick
- Drafted by: New Jersey Nets
- Position: Center
- Number: 40

Career history
- 1985: New Jersey Nets
- Stats at NBA.com
- Stats at Basketball Reference

Yvon Joseph (born October 31, 1957) is a Haitian former basketball player. He played collegiately at Georgia Tech and appeared in one game in the National Basketball Association. Joseph was the first native Haitian to play NCAA Division I college basketball in the United States.

Joseph, a 6'11" center from Cap-Haïtien, Haiti, had never played organized basketball in 1980 when he was discovered by a coach from Miami Dade College and was offered a scholarship to the school. A former volleyball player, Joseph then helped lead the team to an undefeated regular season in his sophomore campaign and reaching the NJCAA Tournament final, falling to Spud Webb and Midland College in overtime. He then moved to Georgia Tech to play for coach Bobby Cremins, where he played from 1982 to 1985. He teamed with future NBA players Mark Price and John Salley to lead the Yellow Jackets to their first Atlantic Coast Conference title and the regional finals of the 1985 NCAA Tournament. For his Georgia Tech career, Joseph scored 758 points (11.7 per game) and 446 rebounds (6.9 per game).

After the close of his college career, Joseph was selected by the New Jersey Nets in the second round of the 1985 NBA draft (36th pick overall). He played only one game in the NBA, scoring two points and committing a personal foul in five minutes of action against the Indiana Pacers on October 26, 1985.

After basketball, Joseph became a businessman who provides water-purification systems to developing countries.

== Career statistics ==
Legend
GP	Games played	GS	Games started	MPG	Minutes per game
FG%	Field goal percentage	3P%	3-point field goal percentage	FT%	Free throw percentage
RPG	Rebounds per game	APG	Assists per game	SPG	Steals per game
BPG	Blocks per game	PPG	Points per game	**Bold**	Career high

=== NBA ===
==== Regular season ====
Year	Team	GP	GS	MPG	FG%	3P%	FT%	RPG	APG	SPG	BPG	PPG
1985–86	New Jersey	1	0	5.0	–	–	1.000	.0	.0	.0	.0	2.0
