= Robert Parish =

American basketball player (born 1953)

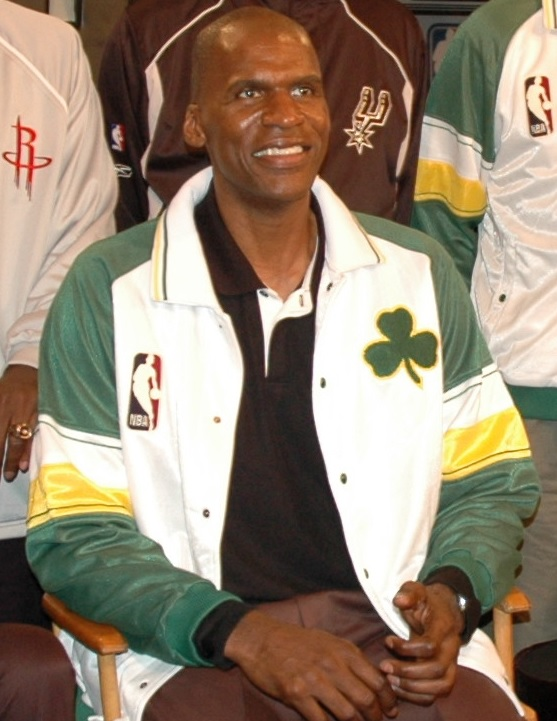
- Parish in 2005

Personal information
- Born: August 30, 1953 (age 73) Shreveport, Louisiana, U.S.
- Listed height: 7 ft 1 in (2.16 m)
- Listed weight: 244 lb (111 kg)

Career information
- High school: Woodlawn (Shreveport, Louisiana)
- College: Centenary (1972–1976)
- NBA draft: 1976: 1st round, 8th overall pick
- Drafted by: Golden State Warriors
- Playing career: 1976–1997
- Position: Center
- Number: 00

Career history

Playing
- 1976–1980: Golden State Warriors
- 1980–1994: Boston Celtics
- 1994–1996: Charlotte Hornets
- 1996–1997: Chicago Bulls

Career highlights
- As player: 4× NBA champion (1981, 1984, 1986, 1997); 9× NBA All-Star (1981–1987, 1990, 1991); All-NBA Second Team (1982); All-NBA Third Team (1989); NBA anniversary team (50th, 75th); No. 00 retired by Boston Celtics; Second-team All-American – AP (1976); First-team Parade All-American (1972); As coach: USBL Coach of the Year (2001)

Career statistics
- Points: 23,334 (14.5 ppg)
- Rebounds: 14,715 (9.1 rpg)
- Blocks: 2,361 (1.5 bpg)
- Stats at NBA.com
- Stats at Basketball Reference
- Basketball Hall of Fame
- Collegiate Basketball Hall of Fame
Medals
Representing United States
Men's basketball
Pan American Games
Gold medal – first place	1975 Mexico City	Team competition

Robert Lee Parish (born August 30, 1953), nicknamed "the Chief", is an American former professional basketball player. A 7-foot-1-inch (2.16 m) center, he played 21 seasons in the National Basketball Association (NBA) for the Golden State Warriors, Boston Celtics, Charlotte Hornets, and Chicago Bulls, helping the Celtics win three NBA championships while teaming with Hall-of-Fame forwards Larry Bird and Kevin McHale, and won a fourth championship with the Bulls prior to his retirement.

During his college career at Centenary College, Parish racked up impressive enough numbers to be drafted three times—twice by teams from the ABA and once in 1976 by the Golden State Warriors of the NBA. Parish played four seasons for the Warriors. In 1980, he was traded to the Boston Celtics along with a draft pick that the Celtics would use to select forward Kevin McHale. Parish and McHale joined star forward Larry Bird on the Celtics. Known as the Big Three, the trio won three NBA championships together. Parish left the Celtics as a free agent following the 1993–1994 season and went on to play two more seasons with the Charlotte Hornets and one with the Chicago Bulls, winning an NBA title with the Bulls in 1997 before retiring from the NBA at age 43.

Parish played 1,611 games in his career, ranking second of all-time in the NBA, behind only LeBron James. He played in 21 NBA seasons, a 5-way tie for third-most in league history. Aside from his career longevity, Parish is known for his strong defense, rebounding and high-trajectory jump shot. He is a nine-time NBA All-Star, a four-time NBA champion and he was named to the NBA's 50th and 75th anniversary teams. The Celtics retired his jersey in 1998. Parish was inducted into the Naismith Basketball Hall of Fame in 2003.

== Early life ==
Robert is the son of Robert Sr. and Ada Parish. He is the oldest of their four children.

Parish was already 6 ft 6 in (1.98 m) tall in the seventh grade (age 12–13) when junior high coach Coleman Kidd first noticed him and encouraged him to play basketball, which was new to him. Coleman would come to the Parish family home if Robert missed a practice and gave Parish a basketball to practice with. It was at this time that Parish started wearing his uniform No. 00. The players got to choose their jerseys in order of perceived ability and since Parish was viewed as the worst player, he received the last remaining jersey, which was number 00. Parish stuck with the jersey throughout his college and professional career.

"I really didn't like basketball growing up." Parish said, talking about how he focused instead on football, baseball and track."[Coach] Coleman would come to my house and take me to practice every day until I had to start showing up myself so I give all the credit to him."

Parish attended Woodlawn High School in Shreveport, Louisiana, where he played for Coach Ken Ivy. He previously attended Union High School until it was closed due to desegregation. Named All-American, All-State, All-District and All-City in 1972, Parish led Woodlawn High School to the 1972 Louisiana High School Athletic Association Class AAAA state championship.

== College career ==
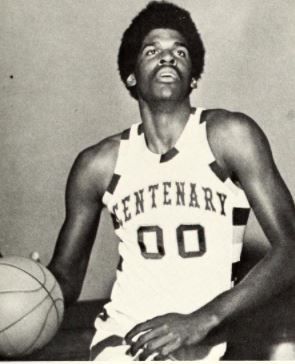
Parish as a junior at Centenary.

Parish attended Centenary College of Louisiana. "The reason why I chose Centenary is because of their coaches," Parish said. "I was very impressed with the coaches." However, he received virtually no notice because of one of the most severe penalties ever levied by the National Collegiate Athletic Association.

Beginning in 1965, the NCAA used a formula to determine the academic eligibility of incoming freshmen seeking to play varsity sports. (At that time, freshmen were generally ineligible to play varsity athletics. The NCAA allowed freshmen to play varsity sports other than football and basketball in 1968 and extended freshman varsity eligibility to those sports in 1972.) Parish took a standardized test that did not fit the NCAA's eligibility formula. Centenary converted his score to an equivalent that fit the formula, which it had done for 12 other athletes in the previous two years. This action violated NCAA regulations, however the NCAA had not paid any attention to the school's moves prior to Parish's recruitment.

Shortly before Parish was to enroll, the NCAA notified Centenary that he and four other basketball players whose test scores had been converted were ineligible to play varsity basketball. The NCAA added that the school would not be penalized if it rescinded the five scholarships. When Centenary refused to pull the scholarships, the NCAA placed Centenary's basketball program on probation for six years. During the six-year probation period, the college was barred from postseason play: its results and statistics were excluded from weekly summaries and its existence was not acknowledged in the NCAA's annual press guides.

Within days of its decision, the NCAA repealed the 1.6 rule but refused to make the five Centenary players eligible. All five, including Parish, sued the NCAA to challenge its eligibility decision but lost. The decision made Parish a sort of "invisible man" who racked up huge statistical totals in virtual obscurity. In his four years at Centenary, the Gents went 87-21 and spent 14 weeks in the AP Top 20 poll, mostly during his senior season in 1975–76. While he averaged 21.6 points and 16.9 rebounds per game during his Centenary career and Centenary recognized his records, the NCAA would not include Parish's statistics in its record books.

=== Team USA 1975 ===
Between his junior and senior years at Centenary, Parish played for Team USA at the 1975 Pan American Games. His issues with the NCAA indirectly led to his not being recommended for a spot on the team. Centenary paid his way to Salt Lake City to enable him to try out for Team USA. Parish made the team, was unanimously elected captain and led the team to a gold medal.

=== College legacy ===
Throughout his time at Centenary, Parish chose not to escape anonymity by either jumping to the National Basketball Association or American Basketball Association (the latter of which existed until the ABA–NBA merger in 1976) or by transferring to another college, even though the professional ranks offered him potential riches and a transfer would have given him eligibility and far more publicity. At the time, professional scouts did not question his physical skills but were divided about whether his decision to stay at Centenary was a show of loyalty or evidence of poor decision-making. For his part, Parish said, "I didn't transfer because Centenary did nothing wrong. And I have no regrets. None."

Overall, Parish averaged 21.6 points and 16.9 rebounds in his 108-game career at Centenary and 24.8 points and 18 rebounds as a senior. The Sporting News named him a first-team All-American as a senior.

In 2018, following a formal appeal from Centenary College, the NCAA announced that Parish's records would be recognized and placed into the NCAA Record Book.

== Professional career ==
=== Golden State Warriors (1976–1980) ===
After college, Parish was drafted in the first round of the 1976 NBA draft by the Golden State Warriors. He had also been drafted by the Utah Stars in the 1973 ABA Special Circumstances draft and by the Spurs in the 1975 ABA draft. Parish signed with the Warriors. The Warriors were NBA champions in 1975 (two seasons prior to Parish's rookie campaign). However, when Parish joined Golden State, their decline had begun so they missed the playoffs completely from 1978 to 1980.

"I was seriously thinking about having a very short basketball career before the trade because of all the losing that I experienced with the Warriors and being blamed for the Warriors demise." Parish said of his time with Golden State. "I understand that because I was the No. 1 player taken (by the team in the 1976 draft) and the blame falls on my shoulders. But basketball is not an individual sport. It's a team sport and I just feel like the team was an assembly of misfits and too much independent thinking. Guys were thinking about themselves as opposed to the team."

In 307 games over four seasons, Parish averaged 13.8 points, 9.5 rebounds and 1.8 blocks with the Warriors.

=== Boston Celtics (1980–1994) ===
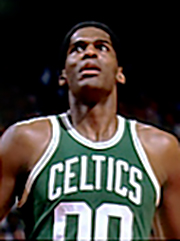
Parish, during his 14 year tenure with the Celtics, received 9 All-Star selections.

Heading into the 1980 NBA draft, the Boston Celtics lost Dave Cowens to retirement and had Larry Bird ready to start his second NBA season. The Celtics held the number one overall pick in the draft.

On June 9, 1980 in a pre-draft trade, Celtics president Red Auerbach dealt the top overall pick and an additional first-round pick to the Warriors for Parish and the Warriors' first-round pick, the third overall. With that pick, the Celtics chose Kevin McHale. The Warriors then selected Joe Barry Carroll with the first pick.

Reflecting on the trade after his retirement, Parish said, "I was surprised initially. But once I hung up from the Warriors after they called me and told me I was being traded to the Boston Celtics, I cheered and I jumped up and down ... because I went from the (penitentiary) to the penthouse in my opinion... Being traded to the Celtics changed the trajectory of my career."

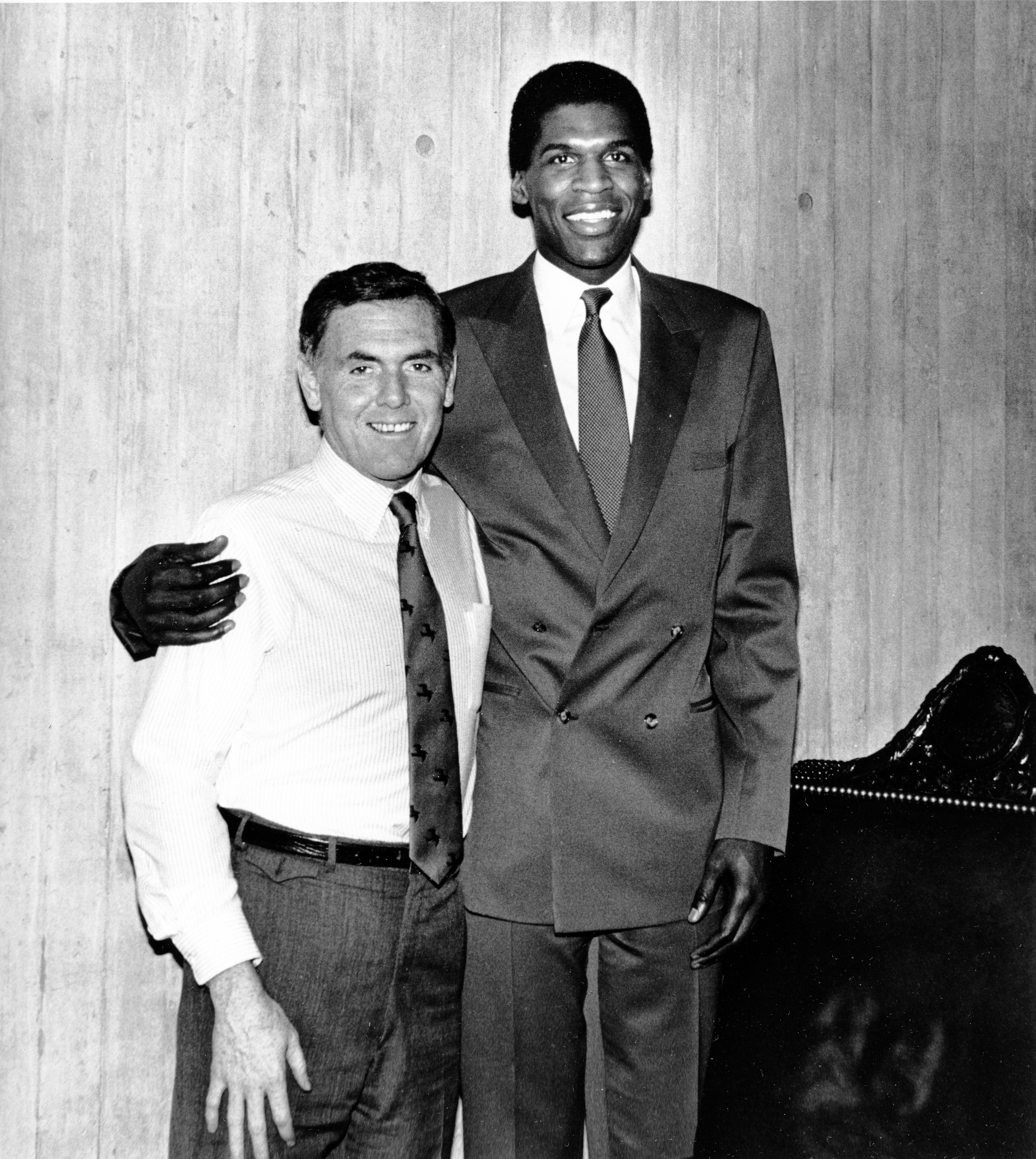
Parish (right) with Boston mayor Raymond Flynn (c. 1984 – c. 1987)

Playing 14 years with the Celtics from 1980 to 1994, Parish won three NBA titles (1981, 1984 and 1986) while teamed with Bird and McHale. The trio came to be known as "The Big Three", and is regarded as one of the greatest frontcourts in NBA history. Parish, Bird, and McHale were all named to the NBA's 50th Anniversary All-Time Team.

Parish was nicknamed "the Chief" after the fictitious Chief Bromden, a silent, giant Native American character in the film One Flew Over the Cuckoo's Nest. According to Parish, former Celtics forward Cedric Maxwell gave him this nickname because of his stoic nature.

Parish was named to the All-NBA Second Team in 1981–82 and to the All-NBA Third Team in 1988–89.

Parish is the Celtics' all-time leader in blocked shots (1,703), offensive rebounds (3,450) and defensive rebounds (7,601). In 14 seasons and 1106 games with the Celtics, Parish averaged a double-double of 16.5 points, 10.0 rebounds and 1.5 blocks, shooting 55.2% from the floor.

=== Charlotte Hornets (1994–1996) ===
On August 4, 1994, at age 41, Parish left the Celtics and signed as an unrestricted free agent with the Charlotte Hornets. Parish spent two seasons with the Hornets, playing as a backup to Alonzo Mourning for the 1994-95 season, and starting 34 games during the 1995-96 season.

=== Chicago Bulls (1996–1997) ===
On September 25, 1996, Parish signed as a free agent with the Chicago Bulls after his release from Charlotte. With Chicago, Parish joined a team coming off a fourth championship with fellow Hall of Famers Michael Jordan, Scottie Pippen, Toni Kukoč and Dennis Rodman.

Playing his final NBA season with the Chicago Bulls in 1996–97, he won his fourth NBA title. Parish played a reserve role for the Bulls. He remained in the NBA until the age of 43. On August 25, 1997, Parish retired from the NBA.

=== Career statistics and records ===
As of 2026, Parish is second on the list of National Basketball Association career games played leaders with 1,611 games played, behind only LeBron James, and is tied for second-most seasons played in NBA history with 21. He is the oldest player to win an NBA championship, having been a member of the NBA champion Chicago Bulls in 1997 at the age of 43. He is also the third-oldest player to ever play an NBA game (the two oldest players to have played in the NBA are Nat Hickey and Kevin Willis).

Overall, in 1,611 NBA games, Parish averaged 14.5 points, 9.1 rebounds, and 1.5 blocks, shooting 53.7% from the field. In 184 career playoff games, Parish averaged 15.3 points, 9.6 rebounds, and 1.7 blocks, shooting 50.6% from the field.

As of 2023, Parish ranks fifth in NBA history in career defensive rebounds with 10,117 and fourth in playoff career offensive rebounds with 571.

== Legacy ==
The Celtics retired Parish's No. 00 in 1998.

Parish is known for his defense, his rebounding, his shot blocking and his ability to run the fast break. Fellow Hall-of-Famer and teammate Bill Walton once called Parish "probably the best medium-range shooting big man in the history of the game". His trademark was his jump shot, which traversed a very high arc before falling.

"There was no showmanship to Robert's game," said Walton. "There was the rebounding. There was the defense. There was the scoring. There was the setting of screens. There was the way he ran the floor. How many centers in today's NBA do any of that"? Another part of Parish’s legacy is his longevity and durability he only missed 73 games throughout his 21 year career, putting him at the top of many NBA statistics involving game played. he later admitted that one of his keys to longevity was never playing basketball during the offseason.

Parish was inducted into the Centenary College Athletics Hall of Fame in 1988, the Louisiana Sports Hall of Fame in 2001, and the College Basketball Hall of Fame in 2006.

In 1996, Parish, along with teammates Larry Bird, Kevin McHale, Nate Archibald and Bill Walton, was selected as one of the 50 Greatest Players in NBA History. On January 18, 1998, the Celtics retired Parish's famous #00 jersey at halftime of a Celtics–Indiana Pacers game with Bird (who was then head coach of the Pacers) and McHale present for the ceremony. He was inducted into the Basketball Hall of Fame in 2003. In October 2021, Parish was again honored as one of the league's greatest players of all time by being named to the NBA 75th Anniversary Team. To commemorate the NBA's 75th Anniversary, The Athletic ranked their top 75 players of all time and chose Parish as the 74th greatest player in NBA history.

"He was there for every practice," McHale said of Parish. "For every game. He very seldom missed anything, including assignments on the floor. His longevity is unbelievable but his dependability was just as impressive".

== Coaching career ==
In 2001, Parish served as the head coach of the Maryland Mustangs, an expansion team in the United States Basketball League (USBL). Parish coached the team to a USBL Northern Division-best 19 wins and 11 losses (.633 win percentage). The team lost a quarterfinal playoff game against the Dodge City Legend, 109–106. Parish was named the USBL Coach of the Year, but the Mustangs folded after one season.

Unlike his Celtics teammates Larry Bird, Danny Ainge and Kevin McHale, Parish has not attained a coaching, executive, or commentary position in the NBA. McHale, who served as the general manager of the Minnesota Timberwolves, said he tried to hire Parish shortly before his departure from the team but was unable to do so because of a lack of available positions. In 2013, Parish said that he considered himself a potential NBA coach and explained that his role during the final three years of his playing career was essentially a coaching role.

As of 2016, Parish was a Celtics consultant, acting as a mentor for the team's big men.

== Personal life ==
Parish was divorced from his wife, Nancy Saad, in 1990. In 1990, Saad sued Parish, accusing him of having physically abused her throughout their marriage. Saad stated that she was hospitalized following a 1987 beating from Parish. Parish denied Saad's accusations; in 2013, however, he admitted to having pushed Saad on June 2, 1987.

Authorities found marijuana in Parish's home in February 1993. Later that month, Parish pleaded guilty to a misdemeanor drug possession charge and was given six months' probation.

During his career, Parish is reputed to have incorporated martial arts, yoga, and vegetarianism into his training and conditioning. In a 2022 interview, Parish stated he was never a vegetarian; he eats chicken and fish, but avoids red meat.

Parish maintains a low profile however he has done work in the local community, working with the Boys & Girls Clubs of Boston.

In 2025, Parish released his autobiography The Chief - the story of the Boston Celtics most enigmatic icon. Co-authored alongside Jacob Uitti, the book mainly focuses on his time with the Celtics but also touches upon his time before and after with the Celtics.

In 2026, Parish served as the grand marshal of the Krewe of Centaur parade in his hometown of Shreveport, Louisiana.

== Career statistics ==
Legend
GP	Games played	GS	Games started	MPG	Minutes per game
FG%	Field goal percentage	3P%	3-point field goal percentage	FT%	Free throw percentage
RPG	Rebounds per game	APG	Assists per game	SPG	Steals per game
BPG	Blocks per game	PPG	Points per game	**Bold**	Career high
†	Won an NBA championship

*	Led NCAA Division I

=== College ===
Year	Team	GP	GS	MPG	FG%	3P%	FT%	RPG	APG	SPG	BPG	PPG
1972–73	Centenary	27	27	32.8	.579	–	.610	**18.7**	.9	–	–	23.0
1973–74	Centenary	25	25	33.6	.523	–	.628	15.3	1.4	–	–	19.9
1974–75	Centenary	**29**	**29**	31.0	.560	–	.661	15.4*	1.5	–	–	18.9
1975–76	Centenary	27	27	**34.8**	**.589**	–	**.694**	18.0*	**1.8**	–	–	**24.8**
Career		108	108	33.0	.564	–	.655	16.9	1.4	–	–	21.6

=== NBA ===
==== Regular season ====
Year	Team	GP	GS	MPG	FG%	3P%	FT%	RPG	APG	SPG	BPG	PPG
1976–77	Golden State	77	1	18.0	.503	—	.708	7.1	1.0	.7	1.2	9.1
1977–78	Golden State	**82**	37	24.0	.472	—	.625	8.3	1.2	1.0	1.5	12.5
1978–79	Golden State	76	75	31.7	.499	—	.698	12.1	1.5	**1.3**	**2.9**	17.2
1979–80	Golden State	72	69	29.4	.507	.000	.715	10.9	1.7	.8	1.6	17.0
1980–81†	Boston	**82**	78	28.0	.545	.000	.710	9.5	1.8	1.0	2.6	18.9
1981–82	Boston	80	78	31.7	.542	—	.710	10.8	1.8	.8	2.4	**19.9**
1982–83	Boston	78	76	31.5	.550	.000	.698	10.6	1.8	1.0	1.9	19.3
1983–84†	Boston	80	79	35.8	.546	—	.745	10.7	1.7	.7	1.5	19.0
1984–85	Boston	79	78	36.1	.542	—	.743	10.6	1.6	.7	1.3	17.6
1985–86†	Boston	81	80	31.7	.549	—	.731	9.5	1.8	.8	1.4	16.1
1986–87	Boston	80	80	**37.4**	.556	.000	.735	10.6	**2.2**	.8	1.8	17.5
1987–88	Boston	74	73	31.2	.589	.000	.734	8.5	1.6	.7	1.1	14.3
1988–89	Boston	80	80	35.5	.570	—	.719	**12.5**	**2.2**	1.0	1.5	18.6
1989–90	Boston	79	78	30.3	.580	—	.747	10.1	1.3	.5	.9	15.7
1990–91	Boston	81	81	30.1	**.598**	.000	.767	10.6	.8	.8	1.3	14.9
1991–92	Boston	79	79	28.9	.535	—	**.772**	8.9	.9	.9	1.2	14.1
1992–93	Boston	79	79	27.2	.535	—	.689	9.4	.8	.7	1.4	12.6
1993–94	Boston	74	74	26.9	.491	—	.740	7.3	1.1	.6	1.3	11.7
1994–95	Charlotte	81	4	16.7	.427	—	.703	4.3	.5	.3	.4	4.8
1995–96	Charlotte	74	34	14.7	.498	—	.704	4.1	.4	.3	.7	3.9
1996–97†	Chicago	43	3	9.4	.490	—	.677	2.1	.5	.1	.4	3.7
Career		1,611	1,320	28.4	.537	.000	.721	9.1	1.4	.8	1.5	14.5
All-Star		9	1	15.8	.529	—	.667	5.9	.9	.4	.9	9.6

==== Playoffs ====
Year	Team	GP	GS	MPG	FG%	3P%	FT%	RPG	APG	SPG	BPG	PPG
1977	Golden State	10	0	23.9	.481	—	.654	10.3	1.1	.7	1.1	12.1
1981†	Boston	17	17	28.9	.493	.000	.672	8.6	1.1	1.2	2.3	15.0
1982	Boston	12	12	35.5	.488	.000	.680	**11.3**	1.5	.4	**4.0**	**21.3**
1983	Boston	7	7	35.6	.483	.000	.850	10.6	1.3	.7	1.3	14.7
1984†	Boston	**23**	**23**	37.8	.478	.000	.646	10.8	1.2	1.0	1.8	14.9
1985	Boston	21	21	**38.2**	.493	.000	.784	10.4	1.5	1.0	1.6	17.1
1986†	Boston	18	18	32.8	.471	.000	.652	8.8	1.4	.5	1.7	15.0
1987	Boston	21	21	35.0	.567	.000	.767	9.4	1.3	.9	1.7	18.0
1988	Boston	17	17	36.8	.532	.000	.820	9.9	1.2	.6	1.1	14.7
1989	Boston	3	3	37.3	.455	.000	.778	8.7	2.0	**1.3**	.7	15.7
1990	Boston	5	5	34.0	.574	.000	**.944**	10.0	**2.6**	1.0	1.4	15.8
1991	Boston	10	10	29.6	**.598**	.000	.689	9.2	.6	.8	.7	15.8
1992	Boston	10	10	33.5	.495	.000	.714	9.7	1.4	.7	1.5	12.0
1993	Boston	4	4	36.5	.544	.000	.857	9.5	1.3	.2	1.5	17.0
1995	Charlotte	4	0	17.8	.545	.000	.400	2.3	.3	.0	.8	3.5
1997†	Chicago	2	0	9.0	.143	.000	.000	2.0	.0	.0	1.5	1.0
Career		184	168	33.6	.506	.000	.722	9.6	1.3	.8	1.7	15.3

== Career highlights and awards ==
NBA

- NBA champion: 1981, 1984, 1986, 1997
- NBA All-Star: 1981, 1982, 1983, 1984, 1985, 1986, 1987, 1988, 1990, 1991
- All-NBA Second Team: 1982
- All-NBA Third Team: 1989
- 50th Anniversary Team: 1996
- No. 00 retired by Boston Celtics: 1998
- 75th Anniversary Team: 2021

College

- Sporting News first-team All-American: 1976
- James J. Corbett Memorial Award (as Louisiana’s Top College athlete): 1975

International

- Pan American Games Gold Medalist: 1975

Halls of Fame

- Centenary College Athletics Hall of Fame: class of 1998
- Louisiana Sports Hall of Fame: class of 2001
- Naismith Memorial Basketball Hall of Fame: class of 2003
- College Basketball Hall of Fame: class of 2006

Other

- Basketball Legacy Award from The Sports Museum at TD Garden: 2012

== See also ==
- List of NBA career games played leaders
- List of NBA career scoring leaders
- List of NBA career rebounding leaders
- List of NBA career blocks leaders
- List of NBA career turnovers leaders
- List of NBA career personal fouls leaders
- List of NBA career minutes played leaders
- List of NBA career playoff rebounding leaders
- List of NBA career playoff blocks leaders
- List of NBA career playoff turnovers leaders
- List of NBA career playoff games played leaders
- List of NBA single-game rebounding leaders
- List of NBA single-game blocks leaders
- List of NBA seasons played leaders
- List of oldest and youngest NBA players
