= 1985–86 New Jersey Nets season =

NBA professional basketball team season

- Head coach: Dave Wohl
- General manager: Lewis Schaffel
- Owners: Secaucus Seven (led by Alan N. Cohen and Joseph Taub)
- Arena: Brendan Byrne Arena

Results
- Record: 39–43 (.476)
- Place: Division: 3rd (Atlantic); Conference: 7th (Eastern)
- Playoff finish: First round (lost to Bucks 0–3)
- Stats at Basketball Reference

Local media
- Television: WOR-TV; SportsChannel New York
- Radio: WNBC

The 1985–86 New Jersey Nets season was the Nets' 10th season in the NBA. After starting the first half of the season strong with a 23–14 record, the Nets lost star Micheal Ray Richardson due to a lifetime ban from the NBA due to repeated drug offenses and Darryl Dawkins to injuries, and then stumbled and went 16–29, finishing with a 39–43 record and barely making it into the playoffs.

== Draft picks ==
Round	Pick	Player	Position	Nationality	College
2	36	Yvon Joseph		Haiti	Georgia Tech
2	38	Fernando Martín	C/PF	Spain	
3	62	Nigel Manuel		United States	UCLA
5	108	Kelly Blaine		United States	South Alabama
6	130	George Almones		United States	Louisiana–Lafayette
7	154	Gary McLain	PG	United States	Villanova

== Roster ==
1985–86 New Jersey Nets roster
Players

Pos.	No.	Player	Height	Weight	DOB	From
SG	10	Otis Birdsong	6 ft 3 in (1.91 m)	190 lb (86 kg)	1955-12-09	Houston
PF	45	Bobby Cattage	6 ft 9 in (2.06 m)	250 lb (113 kg)	1958-08-17	Auburn
PG	12	Darwin Cook	6 ft 3 in (1.91 m)	184 lb (83 kg)	1958-08-06	Portland
C	53	Darryl Dawkins	6 ft 11 in (2.11 m)	251 lb (114 kg)	1957-01-11	Maynard Evans HS (FL)
C	42	Mike Gminski	6 ft 11 in (2.11 m)	250 lb (113 kg)	1959-08-03	Duke
PF	43	Mickey Johnson	6 ft 10 in (2.08 m)	190 lb (86 kg)	1952-08-31	Aurora
SF	55	Albert King	6 ft 6 in (1.98 m)	190 lb (86 kg)	1959-12-17	Maryland
SF	31	Mike O'Koren	6 ft 7 in (2.01 m)	207 lb (94 kg)	1958-02-07	North Carolina
PG	14	Kelvin Ransey	6 ft 1 in (1.85 m)	170 lb (77 kg)	1958-05-03	Ohio State
PF	35	Jeff Turner	6 ft 9 in (2.06 m)	230 lb (104 kg)	1962-04-09	Vanderbilt
PF	52	Buck Williams	6 ft 8 in (2.03 m)	215 lb (98 kg)	1960-03-08	Maryland
SG	13	Ray Williams	6 ft 3 in (1.91 m)	188 lb (85 kg)	1954-10-14	Minnesota

Coaches
Head coach
- Dave Wohl

Legend
- (DP) Unsigned draft pick
- (FA) Free agent
- (S) Suspended
- Injured

Roster

Roster notes

- The Nets let F Rod Higgins's 10-day contract expire.
- C Yvon Joseph was waived after playing 1 game in the NBA.
- G Micheal Ray Richardson received a lifetime ban on February 25 after he violated the league's drug policy three times.

== Regular season ==
=== Season standings ===
Atlantic Division	W	L	PCT	GB	Home	Road	Div
y-Boston Celtics	67	15	.817	–	40–1	27–14	18–6
x-Philadelphia 76ers	54	28	.659	13	31–10	23–18	15–9
x-Washington Bullets	39	43	.476	28	26–15	13–28	11–13
x-New Jersey Nets	39	43	.476	28	26–15	13–28	11–13
New York Knicks	23	59	.280	44	15–26	8–33	5–19

#	Eastern Conference				
#	Team	W	L	PCT	GB
1	z-Boston Celtics	67	15	.817	–
2	y-Milwaukee Bucks	57	25	.695	10
3	x-Philadelphia 76ers	54	28	.659	13
4	x-Atlanta Hawks	50	32	.610	17
5	x-Detroit Pistons	46	36	.561	21
6	x-Washington Bullets	39	43	.476	28
7	x-New Jersey Nets	39	43	.476	28
8	x-Chicago Bulls	30	52	.366	37
9	Cleveland Cavaliers	29	53	.354	38
10	Indiana Pacers	26	56	.317	41
11	New York Knicks	23	59	.280	44

== Playoffs ==
1986 playoff game log
First round: 0–3 (home: 0–1; road: 0–2)

Game	Date	Team	Score	High points	High rebounds	High assists	Location Attendance	Series
1	April 18	@ Milwaukee	L 107–119	Buck Williams (27)	Buck Williams (14)	Birdsong, Cook (7)	MECCA Arena; 11,052	0–1
2	April 20	@ Milwaukee	L 97–111	Mike Gminski (28)	Mike Gminski (13)	Darwin Cook (7)	MECCA Arena; 11,052	0–2
3	April 22	Milwaukee	L 113–118	Otis Birdsong (28)	Buck Williams (10)	Kelvin Ransey (4)	Brendan Byrne Arena; 7,784	0–3

1986 schedule

== See also ==
- 1985–86 NBA season
