= Mike Gminski =

American basketball player (born 1959)

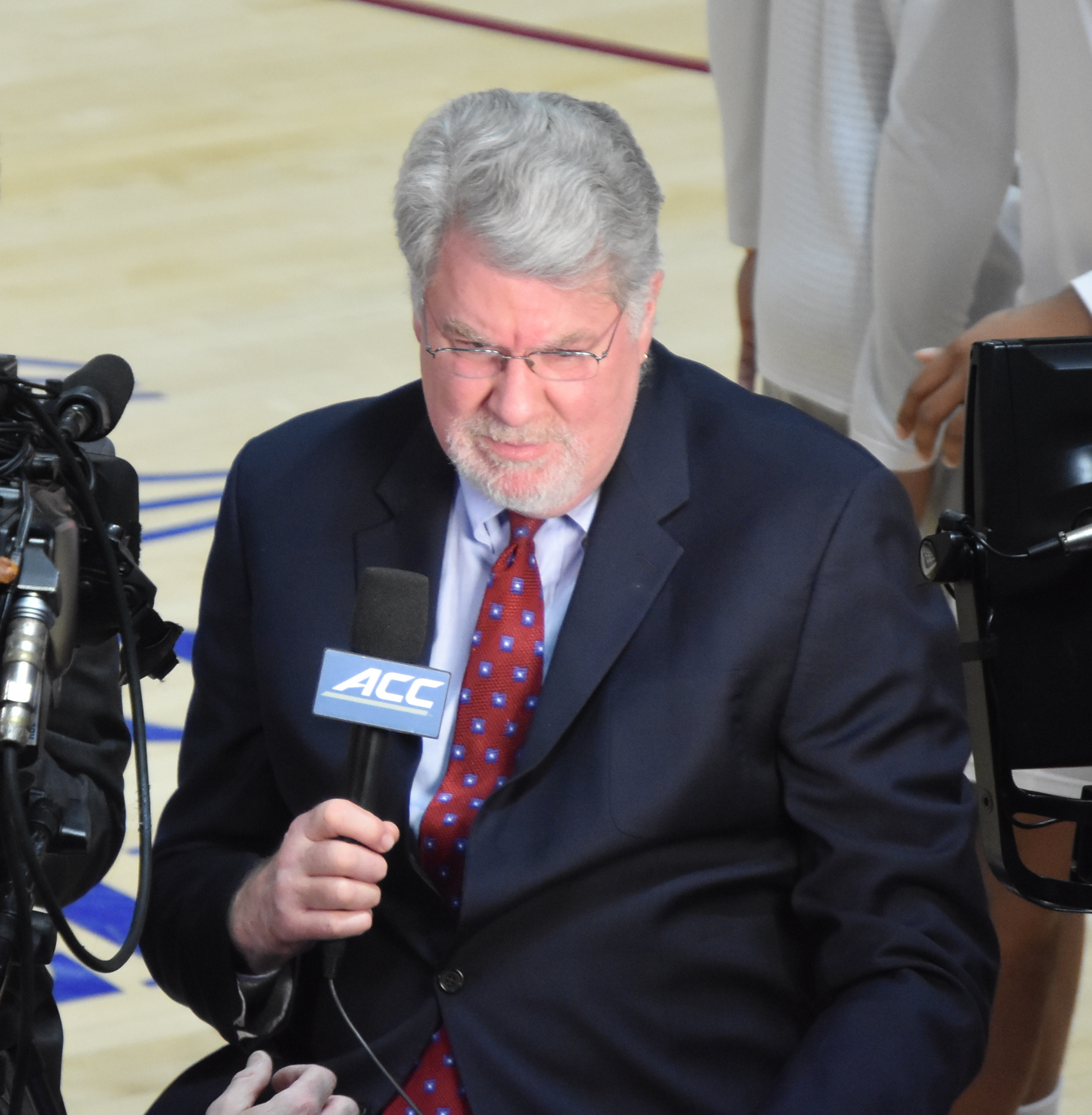
- Gminski at a 2020 college basketball game

Personal information
- Born: August 3, 1959 (age 67) Monroe, Connecticut, U.S.
- Listed height: 6 ft 11 in (2.11 m)
- Listed weight: 250 lb (113 kg)

Career information
- High school: Masuk (Monroe, Connecticut)
- College: Duke (1976–1980)
- NBA draft: 1980: 1st round, 7th overall pick
- Drafted by: New Jersey Nets
- Playing career: 1980–1994
- Position: Center
- Number: 42, 43

Career history
- 1980–1988: New Jersey Nets
- 1988–1991: Philadelphia 76ers
- 1991–1994: Charlotte Hornets
- 1994: Milwaukee Bucks

Career highlights
- Consensus first-team All-American (1979); Consensus second-team All-American (1980); ACC Player of the Year (1979); 3× First-team All-ACC (1978–1980); ACC co-Rookie of the Year (1977); No. 43 retired by Duke Blue Devils

Career NBA statistics
- Points: 10,953 (11.7 ppg)
- Rebounds: 6,480 (6.9 rpg)
- Assists: 1,203 (1.3 apg)
- Stats at NBA.com
- Stats at Basketball Reference

Michael Thomas Gminski (born August 3, 1959) is an American former professional basketball player and a college basketball TV analyst for the ACC Network, ACC on The CW and CBS Sports. In 2003, Gminski, of Polish descent, was inducted into the National Polish American Sports Hall of Fame.

== Early career ==
Gminski played his high school ball for Masuk High School in Monroe, CT, where he graduated in three years. He is considered a pioneer in reclassifying, graduating early to jump start his college basketball career.

== College career ==
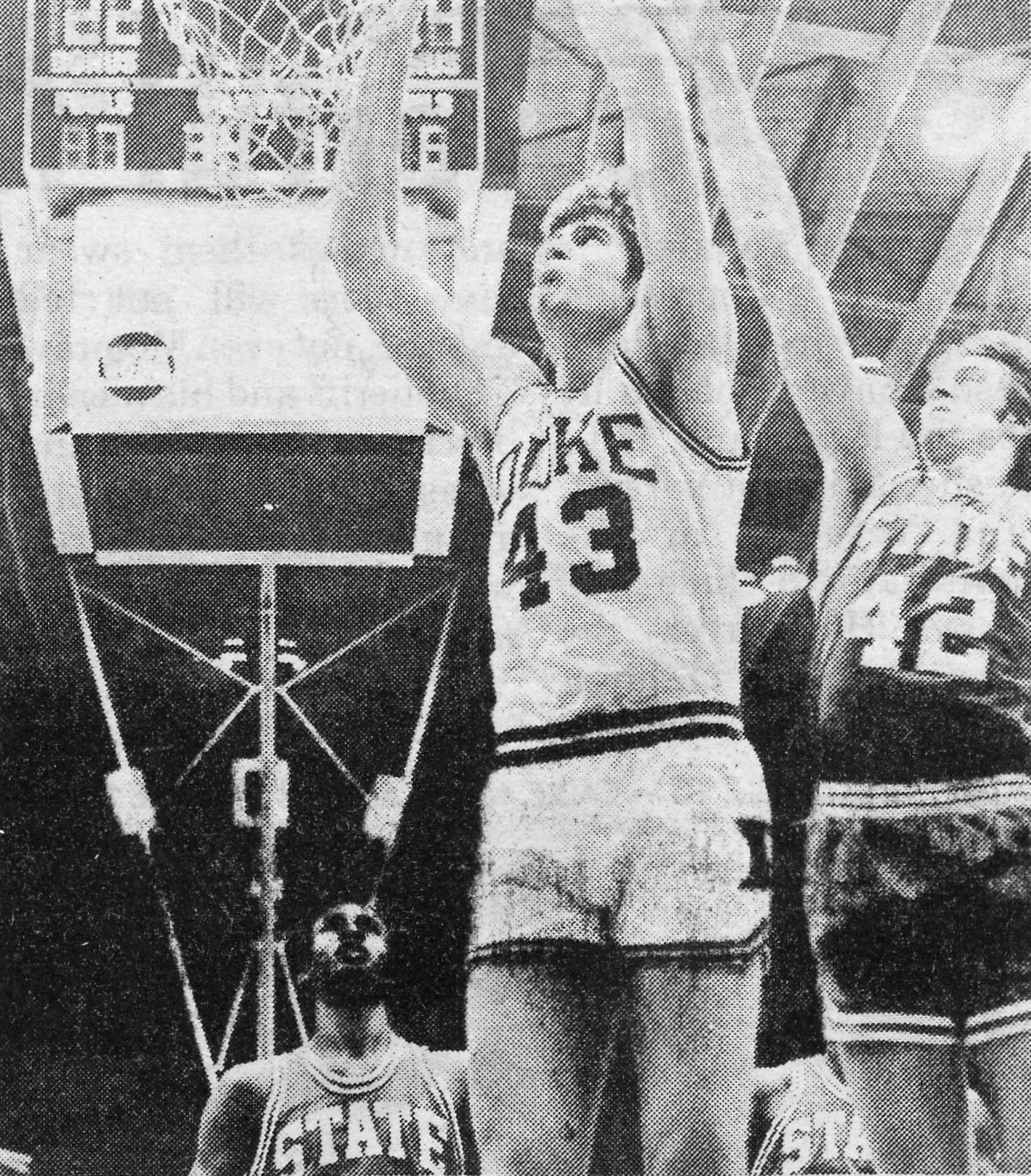
Gminski at Duke

From there he played four seasons with the Duke Blue Devils, from 1977 to 1980. He led the team in scoring during his junior and senior years. Gminski was named the ACC Rookie of the Year (tied) in 1977, first team All-ACC three years, 1978, 1979, and 1980, and ACC Player of the Year in 1979. He was also named an AP Second Team All-American in 1979 and 1980, and a UPI First Team All-American in 1979 and Second Team All-American in 1980.

At the time of graduation, he was the Duke career leader in points (2,323), rebounds (1,242), and blocked shots (345). As of early 2020, he is eighth all time in the ACC in points and rebounds. He is sixth in blocked shots all-time in the ACC and second in Duke history. He is also second in Duke career rebounds behind Shelden Williams and fifth in points behind JJ Redick, Johnny Dawkins, Christian Laettner, and Kyle Singler. His jersey number 43 is retired by the Duke men's basketball team. In 2002, Gminski was named to the ACC 50th Anniversary men's basketball team as one of the 50 greatest players in Atlantic Coast Conference history.

== NBA career ==
Gminski was drafted in the first round by the New Jersey Nets of the NBA. He played for the Nets from 1980 to 1988. One of the best games of Gminski's career was one of his first, January 7th, 1981, when he logged 27 points, 13 rebounds, 4 assists, two steals and blocked three shots against Indiana. Gminski played in the Summer Pro League in 1981, where during a game he was elbowed in the back which caused an infection and blood clot. He went on to play with the Philadelphia 76ers, as well as the Charlotte Hornets and Milwaukee Bucks. He wore jersey No 42 throughout his career and only got to wear No 43 (his Duke number) in his final 8 games with the Milwaukee Bucks. He scored 10 points in his final NBA game.

In a remarkable start to the 1990 season, Gminski and teammates made a pact that if the Sixers won 10 in a row, they would each get their ears pierced. When the team pulled off 12 in a row, he, Rick Mahorn and the others were sporting diamond earrings to commemorate the feat.

Gminski was an exceptional free throw shooter, especially compared to other big men (Gminski was listed at 6 ft 11 in (2.11 m)). During his career, he converted over 84% of his attempts.

== Career statistics ==
Legend
GP	Games played	GS	Games started	MPG	Minutes per game
FG%	Field goal percentage	3P%	3-point field goal percentage	FT%	Free throw percentage
RPG	Rebounds per game	APG	Assists per game	SPG	Steals per game
BPG	Blocks per game	PPG	Points per game	**Bold**	Career high
*	Led the league

=== Regular season ===
Year	Team	GP	GS	MPG	FG%	3P%	FT%	RPG	APG	SPG	BPG	PPG
1980–81	New Jersey	56	—	28.2	.423	.000	.767	7.5	1.3	**1.0**	**1.8**	13.2
1981–82	New Jersey	64	6	11.6	.441	—	.822	2.9	.6	.3	.8	5.2
1982–83	New Jersey	80	1	15.7	.500	.000	.778	4.8	.8	.4	1.5	7.5
1983–84	New Jersey	**82***	2	20.2	.513	.000	.799	5.3	1.1	.5	.9	7.6
1984–85	New Jersey	81	54	29.9	.465	.000	.841	7.8	**2.0**	.5	1.1	12.8
1985–86	New Jersey	81	78	31.2	**.517**	.000	.893	8.2	1.6	.7	.9	16.5
1986–87	New Jersey	72	66	31.6	.457	—	.846	8.8	1.4	.7	1.0	16.4
1987–88	New Jersey	34	34	35.1	.454	.000	.861	9.4	1.6	.8	1.0	16.9
1987–88	Philadelphia	47	47	**37.6**	.445	—	**.938**	**10.5**	1.8	.8	**1.8**	16.9
1988–89	Philadelphia	**82***	**82**	33.4	.477	.000	.871	9.4	1.7	.6	1.3	**17.2**
1989–90	Philadelphia	81	81	32.8	.457	.176	.821	8.5	1.6	.5	1.3	13.7
1990–91	Philadelphia	30	29	26.4	.384	.125	.841	6.7	1.1	.5	1.1	9.1
1990–91	Charlotte	50	50	28.1	.473	.167	.789	7.6	1.2	.5	.4	11.4
1991–92	Charlotte	35	10	14.3	.452	**.333**	.750	3.4	.9	.3	.5	5.8
1992–93	Charlotte	34	0	7.4	.506	—	.900	2.5	.2	.0	.3	2.7
1993–94	Charlotte	21	6	12.1	.392	—	.786	2.8	.5	.6	.6	3.5
1993–94	Milwaukee	8	1	6.8	.208	—	.750	1.9	.0	.0	.4	1.6
Career		938	547	25.6	.465	.122	.843	6.9	1.3	.5	1.1	11.7

=== Playoffs ===
Year	Team	GP	GS	MPG	FG%	3P%	FT%	RPG	APG	SPG	BPG	PPG
1982	New Jersey	1	—	10.0	**.667**	—	.500	2.0	.0	.0	0	5.0
1983	New Jersey	2	—	14.5	**.667**	—	.750	4.5	.5	.0	2.0	7.5
1984	New Jersey	**11**	—	20.3	.580	—	.692	5.0	.5	.6	1.4	8.5
1985	New Jersey	3	0	27.0	.545	—	**1.000**	6.3	1.3	1.0	1.7	14.0
1986	New Jersey	3	3	36.3	.372	—	.963	**10.0**	**1.7**	**1.3**	.7	**19.3**
1989	Philadelphia	3	3	**39.3**	.396	—	.688	7.7	.7	.0	**2.7**	16.3
1990	Philadelphia	10	**10**	34.2	.487	.000	.933	5.4	1.1	.8	2.3	12.8
1993	Charlotte	2	0	2.5	.500	—	—	.5	.0	.0	.0	1.0
Career		35	16	26.2	.485	.000	.795	5.5	.8	.6	1.6	11.2

== See also ==
- List of NCAA Division I men's basketball players with 2,000 points and 1,000 rebounds
