= Darwin Cook =

American basketball player and coach (born 1958)

Personal information
- Born: August 6, 1958 (age 68) Los Angeles, California, U.S.
- Listed height: 6 ft 3 in (1.91 m)
- Listed weight: 184 lb (83 kg)

Career information
- High school: Crenshaw (Los Angeles, California)
- College: Portland (1976–1980)
- NBA draft: 1980: 4th round, 70th overall pick
- Drafted by: Detroit Pistons
- Playing career: 1980–1992
- Position: Point guard / shooting guard
- Number: 12, 1

Career history

Playing
- 1980–1986: New Jersey Nets
- 1986–1987: Washington Bullets
- 1987–1988: La Crosse Catbirds
- 1988: Scavolini Pesaro
- 1988–1989: San Antonio Spurs
- 1989: Denver Nuggets
- 1989–1991: Scavolini Pesaro
- 1991–1992: Quad City Thunder

Coaching
- 2017–2019: Antelope Valley

Career highlights
- 2× Italian League champion (1988, 1990)

Career NBA statistics
- Points: 5,820 (9.5 ppg)
- Rebounds: 1,308 (2.1 spg)
- Assists: 2,248 (3.7 rpg)
- Stats at NBA.com
- Stats at Basketball Reference

Darwin Louis Cook (born August 6, 1958) is an American basketball coach and former player.

== Playing career ==
Cook played college basketball for the Portland Pilots from 1976 to 1980, and was selected by the Detroit Pistons with the 70th overall pick in the 1980 NBA draft.

Cook's NBA career lasted from 1980 to 1989, and he played for the New Jersey Nets, Washington Bullets, Denver Nuggets, and San Antonio Spurs. In 1987, he signed a one-year contract with Scavolini Pesaro of the Italian Serie A1 before returning to the NBA for one more season, playing for the Nuggets and the Spurs. After his NBA career, in 1989, he returned to Italy and signed a two-year contract with Scavolini.

== Coaching career ==
On May 19, 2017, Cook was named a head coach of the University of Antelope Valley's Pioneers men's basketball team.

== Career playing statistics ==
Legend
GP	Games played	GS	Games started	MPG	Minutes per game
FG%	Field goal percentage	3P%	3-point field goal percentage	FT%	Free throw percentage
RPG	Rebounds per game	APG	Assists per game	SPG	Steals per game
BPG	Blocks per game	PPG	Points per game	**Bold**	Career high
*	Led the league

=== NBA ===
==== Regular season ====
Year	Team	GP	GS	MPG	FG%	3P%	FT%	RPG	APG	SPG	BPG	PPG
1980–81	New Jersey	81		24.4	.468	**.240**	.733	**2.9**	3.7	1.7	.4	11.2
1981–82	New Jersey	**82**	17	25.5	**.482**	.226	.728	1.9	3.9	1.8	.3	11.0
1982–83	New Jersey	**82**	**47**	**32.0**	.449	.211	.769	**2.9**	**5.5**	**2.4**	**.6**	**13.2**
1983–84	New Jersey	**82***	31	22.8	.443	.239	.754	1.9	4.3	2.0	.4	8.7
1984–85	New Jersey	58	9	18.3	.468	.087	**.870**	1.6	2.8	1.3	.2	8.2
1985–86	New Jersey	79	33	24.9	.426	.208	.757	2.2	4.9	2.0	.3	8.0
1986–87	Washington	**82***	2	17.3	.426	.087	.796	1.8	1.8	1.2	.2	7.5
1988–89	San Antonio	36	0	21.0	.467	.194	.821	1.6	2.3	1.2	.1	9.6
1988–89	Denver	30	4	12.9	.436	.200	.773	1.6	1.4	.9	.2	5.4
Career		612	143	23.1	.453	.196	.764	2.1	3.7	1.7	.3	9.5

==== Playoffs ====
Year	Team	GP	GS	MPG	FG%	3P%	FT%	RPG	APG	SPG	BPG	PPG
1982	New Jersey	2		**43.0**	.394	.000	.333	1.5	4.5	1.0	**1.0**	**14.0**
1983	New Jersey	2		31.5	.333	.000	**1.000**	3.0	5.0	.5	.0	10.0
1984	New Jersey	**11**		16.8	.366	.308	.708	1.6	2.8	1.4	.0	7.4
1985	New Jersey	1	0	7.0	**.750**	–	–	.0	1.0	.0	.0	6.0
1986	New Jersey	3	0	25.7	.448	.000	.333	2.3	**5.7**	**1.7**	.7	9.3
1987	Washington	3	0	13.7	.250	**.500**	.500	2.3	1.0	1.3	.0	4.7
1989	Denver	3	**3**	22.0	.500	**.500**	**1.000**	**4.3**	3.7	1.0	.0	10.3
Career		25	3	21.0	.386	.240	.652	2.2	3.3	1.2	.2	8.3

== See also ==
- List of National Basketball Association single-game steals leaders
