= Kelvin Ransey =

American basketball player (born 1958)

Personal information
- Born: May 3, 1958 (age 68) Toledo, Ohio, U.S.
- Listed height: 6 ft 1 in (1.85 m)
- Listed weight: 170 lb (77 kg)

Career information
- High school: Macomber (Toledo, Ohio)
- College: Ohio State (1976–1980)
- NBA draft: 1980: 1st round, 4th overall pick
- Drafted by: Chicago Bulls
- Playing career: 1980–1990
- Position: Point guard
- Number: 14

Career history
- 1980–1982: Portland Trail Blazers
- 1982–1983: Dallas Mavericks
- 1983–1986: New Jersey Nets
- 1989–1990: Columbus Horizon

Career highlights
- NBA All-Rookie First Team (1981); Consensus second-team All-American (1980); Third-team All-American – UPI (1979); 3× First-team All-Big Ten (1978–1980)

Career NBA statistics
- Points: 5,380 (11.4 ppg)
- Rebounds: 901 (1.9 rpg)
- Assists: 2,480 (5.2 apg)
- Stats at NBA.com
- Stats at Basketball Reference

Kelvin Ransey (born May 3, 1958) is an American former professional basketball player in the National Basketball Association (NBA) in the 1980s.

Ransey attended Toledo's Macomber High School in the mid-1970s. He was a four-year starter playing college basketball for the Ohio State Buckeyes from 1976 to 1979 where he played both point and shooting guard.

The 6-foot-1-inch (1.85 m) Ransey was the fourth overall pick in the 1980 NBA draft, by the Chicago Bulls. He was traded to the Portland Trail Blazers before the season began. He was runner-up by one vote for NBA Rookie of the Year (to Darrell Griffith) in 1980–81. Ransey played for six years in the NBA for 3 teams, averaging 11.4 points and 5.2 assists per game. His best season, statistically, was his second, when he averaged over 16 points and 7 assists.

Ransey retired following the 1985–86 season, returning to Toledo to become a preacher. He attempted a comeback in the 1989–90 season, playing 25 games for the Columbus Horizon of the Continental Basketball Association. He averaged 13.9 points per game for the Horizon. In 2000, he moved to Tupelo, Mississippi. Twice married, he has six children.

Ransey's younger brother, Clinton Ransey, played college basketball at Cleveland State from 1983 to 1987. Clinton was a teammate of Ken "The Mouse" McFadden for part of his college career.

== Career statistics ==
Legend
GP	Games played	GS	Games started	MPG	Minutes per game
FG%	Field goal percentage	3P%	3-point field goal percentage	FT%	Free throw percentage
RPG	Rebounds per game	APG	Assists per game	SPG	Steals per game
BPG	Blocks per game	PPG	Points per game	**Bold**	Career high

=== NBA ===
==== Regular season ====
Year	Team	GP	GS	MPG	FG%	3P%	FT%	RPG	APG	SPG	BPG	PPG
1980–81	Portland	80		30.4	.452	.097	.749	**2.4**	6.9	1.1	**.1**	15.2
1981–82	Portland	78	**68**	**31.0**	**.460**	**.079**	.761	**2.4**	**7.1**	**1.2**	**.1**	**16.1**
1982–83	Dallas	76	4	21.1	**.460**	.125	.764	1.9	3.7	.8	**.1**	11.1
1983–84	New Jersey	80	50	24.2	.434	**.219**	.792	1.6	6.0	1.1	**.1**	9.5
1984–85	New Jersey	**81**	29	20.9	.459	.182	**.859**	1.6	4.4	1.1	**.1**	8.9
1985–86	L.A. Lakers	79	15	19.0	.457	.125	.818	1.5	3.2	.6	**.1**	7.4
Career		474	166	24.4	.454	.132	.782	1.9	5.2	1.0	.1	11.4

==== Playoffs ====
Year	Team	GP	GS	MPG	FG%	3P%	FT%	RPG	APG	SPG	BPG	PPG
1981	Portland	3		**43.7**	.354	.000	.500	**4.0**	**8.3**	**2.0**	**.3**	**16.3**
1984	New Jersey	**5**		8.8	.429	**1.000**	–	.2	2.0	.0	.2	2.6
1985	New Jersey	3	**3**	21.0	.375	–	**1.000**	1.7	5.7	.7	**.3**	5.7
1986	New Jersey	3	**3**	22.7	.455	.333	.750	2.3	4.0	.3	.0	9.0
Career		14	6	21.9	.385	.400	.737	1.8	4.6	.6	.2	7.6
