= Blair Rasmussen =

American basketball player

Personal information
- Born: November 13, 1962 (age 64) Auburn, Washington, U.S.
- Listed height: 7 ft 0 in (2.13 m)
- Listed weight: 250 lb (113 kg)

Career information
- High school: Auburn (Auburn, Washington)
- College: Oregon (1981–1985)
- NBA draft: 1985: 1st round, 15th overall pick
- Drafted by: Denver Nuggets
- Playing career: 1985–1993
- Position: Center
- Number: 41

Career history
- 1985–1991: Denver Nuggets
- 1991–1993: Atlanta Hawks

Career highlights
- 3× First-team All-Pac-10 (1983–1985); Fourth-team Parade All-American (1981)

Career NBA statistics
- Points: 5,119 (9.6 ppg)
- Rebounds: 3,006 (5.7 rpg)
- Stats at NBA.com
- Stats at Basketball Reference

Blair Allen Rasmussen (born November 13, 1962) is a retired American professional basketball player who was selected by the Denver Nuggets in the first round (15th pick overall) of the 1985 NBA draft. A 7'0" center from the University of Oregon, Rasmussen played for eight seasons in the NBA, from 1985 to 1993.

He played for the Nuggets from 1985 to 1991 and for the Atlanta Hawks from 1991 to 1993. The best year of Rasmussen's professional career came during the 1990–91 season as a member of the Nuggets, when he appeared in 70 games (69 starts), and averaged 12.5 points per game and 1.9 blocks per game.

== Career statistics ==
Legend
GP	Games played	GS	Games started	MPG	Minutes per game
FG%	Field goal percentage	3P%	3-point field goal percentage	FT%	Free throw percentage
RPG	Rebounds per game	APG	Assists per game	SPG	Steals per game
BPG	Blocks per game	PPG	Points per game	**Bold**	Career high

=== NBA ===
==== Regular season ====
Year	Team	GP	GS	MPG	FG%	3P%	FT%	RPG	APG	SPG	BPG	PPG
1985–86	Denver	48	1	6.9	.407	–	.795	2.0	.3	.1	.2	3.2
1986–87	Denver	74	23	19.2	.470	–	.732	6.3	.8	.3	.8	9.5
1987–88	Denver	79	45	22.5	.492	–	.776	5.5	1.0	.3	1.0	**12.7**
1988–89	Denver	77	22	17.0	.445	–	**.852**	3.7	.6	.4	.5	7.6
1989–90	Denver	**81**	55	24.6	**.497**	.000	.828	7.3	1.0	.5	1.3	12.4
1990–91	Denver	70	**69**	**33.2**	.458	**.400**	.677	**9.7**	1.0	**.7**	**1.9**	12.5
1991–92	Atlanta	**81**	61	24.3	.478	.217	.750	4.9	**1.3**	.4	.6	9.0
1992–93	Atlanta	22	3	12.9	.375	.333	.692	2.5	.2	.2	.5	3.2
Career		532	282	21.4	.472	.257	.767	5.7	.9	.4	.9	9.6

==== Playoffs ====
Year	Team	GP	GS	MPG	FG%	3P%	FT%	RPG	APG	SPG	BPG	PPG
1986	Denver	10	4	17.5	.406	–	.805	6.0	1.0	.5	.9	11.1
1987	Denver	3	3	**30.7**	**.489**	–	.500	7.7	**2.3**	**.7**	.7	**16.3**
1988	Denver	**11**	**11**	25.2	.472	–	**.900**	6.5	.6	.1	1.1	12.5
1989	Denver	2	.0	2.0	–	–	–	.0	.0	.0	.0	.0
1990	Denver	3	0	28.0	.396	–	**.900**	'**8.7**	.3	**.7**	**1.3**	15.3
Career		29	18	21.8	.443	–	.802	6.2	.9	.3	.9	11.9
