= 1985–86 Boston Celtics season =

NBA basketball team season (won NBA championship)

- NBA champions
- Conference champions
- Division champions
- Head coach: K. C. Jones
- General manager: Jan Volk
- Owners: Don Gaston; Alan N. Cohen; Paul Dupee
- Arena: Boston Garden; Hartford Civic Center

Results
- Record: 67–15 (.817)
- Place: Division: 1st (Atlantic); Conference: 1st (Eastern)
- Playoff finish: NBA champions (Defeated Rockets 4–2)
- Stats at Basketball Reference

Local media
- Television: WLVI (Gil Santos, Bob Cousy); SportsChannel New England (Mike Gorman, Tom Heinsohn)
- Radio: WRKO (Johnny Most, Glenn Ordway)

The 1985–86 Boston Celtics season was the 40th season of the Boston Celtics in the National Basketball Association (NBA). They finished with the best record in the league at 67–15, including a 40–1 record at home (37–1 at the Boston Garden, 3–0 at the Hartford Civic Center). Those 40 home wins set an NBA record which would only be matched by the San Antonio Spurs in 2016. Arguably considered the best Celtics team ever, and widely regarded among the greatest teams in NBA history, their 67 total wins were one win shy of tying their franchise record of 68 wins set in 1973, and tied for fifth all-time.

Larry Bird won his third consecutive MVP award and Bill Walton won the Sixth Man of the Year Award. The team was anchored by the "Big Three" frontcourt of Bird, Kevin McHale and Robert Parish, which is frequently ranked among the best frontcourts in NBA history.

In the playoffs, the Celtics swept the Chicago Bulls in three games in the First Round, then defeated the Atlanta Hawks in five games in the Semi-finals, before sweeping the Milwaukee Bucks in four games in the Conference Finals to reach the NBA Finals for a third consecutive season. In the NBA Finals, the Celtics faced off against the Houston Rockets in a rematch of the 1981 NBA Finals, which the Celtics won in six games, winning every home game in the playoffs. The Celtics would go on to win their 16th championship and the last for 22 years, defeating the Houston Rockets in six games in the NBA Finals, and had won 82 combined regular season and playoff games, a record that stood until the Chicago Bulls racked up 87 combined wins en route to a title in 1996 (with the Golden State Warriors later breaking that record in 2016 with 88 combined wins, including a 73–9 regular season record, although they infamously lost in the finals that season after leading the series 3–1). HoopsHype later ranked this squad as the team with the 17th easiest path to the NBA Finals in 2024 due to the 30–52 record of their first round opponent, the Chicago Bulls.

== NBA draft ==
The 1985 NBA draft took place on June 18, 1985. It was also the first NBA Draft of the "Lottery" era. The lottery was put into place so teams could not intentionally lose games to receive the number one pick.

Round	Pick	Player	Position	Nationality	School/Club team
1	20	Sam Vincent	Guard	United States	Michigan State
3	70	Andre Battle	Guard	United States	Loyola (IL)
4	93	Cliff Webber	Forward	United States	Liberty Baptist
5	116	Albert Butts	Forward	United States	La Salle
6	139	Ralph Lewis	Guard	United States	La Salle
7	162	Chris Remly		United States	Rutgers

== Season Synopsis ==
The Celtics were coming from a 6-game NBA Finals series against their arch-rival the Los Angeles Lakers. They ended with a record 63-19 during the regular season, a league-best record, earning home court advantage throughout the playoffs.

=== October/November ===
They started their 1985–86 season campaign with a 109-113 OT loss to the New Jersey Nets, despite a near quadruple-double performance from Larry Bird, who recorded 21 points, 12 rebounds, 10 assists and 8 steals for the Celtics. The next day, Kevin McHale's 26 points and 15 rebounds led the Celtics towards a 105–100 road win over the Cavaliers. Four days later, the Celtics defeated the visiting Bucks, 117–106, with Bird, McHale, Parish and Johnson, all scoring at least 20 points. They ended the month of October with a 2–1 record, and were 15-2 at the end of November.

== Regular season ==
- Under head coach K. C. Jones, the 1985–86 Boston Celtics finished the regular season with a record of 67–15. This team is generally considered to be the best of Larry Bird's career. In addition to longtime Celtics Kevin McHale and Robert Parish, the franchise was joined on the front line by former NBA MVP Bill Walton. Despite a career plagued by a series of serious injuries to his knees, ankles and feet, Walton would win the NBA Sixth Man of the Year Award. Walton had missed essentially the past two seasons and the Los Angeles Clippers put him on the trade bloc as his contract ran out. The Los Angeles Lakers and the Celtics were both interested, but the Lakers wanted Walton to be cleared by their team doctor before making any trade. The Celtics, on the other hand, were willing to trade former Finals MVP Cedric Maxwell for Walton-based solely on his word that he felt he was healthy enough to play. Walton appeared in a career high 80 games. The backcourt was led by the MVP of the 1979 NBA Finals, defensive stopper Dennis Johnson, and former Toronto Blue Jays baseball player, shooting guard Danny Ainge. Off the bench, the Celtics featured former All-Star Scott Wedman and recent acquisition (from the Indiana Pacers) Jerry Sichting.

=== Season standings ===
Atlantic Division	W	L	PCT	GB	Home	Road	Div
y-Boston Celtics	67	15	.817	–	40–1	27–14	18–6
x-Philadelphia 76ers	54	28	.659	13	31–10	23–18	15–9
x-Washington Bullets	39	43	.476	28	26–15	13–28	11–13
x-New Jersey Nets	39	43	.476	28	26–15	13–28	11–13
New York Knicks	23	59	.280	44	15–26	8–33	5–19

#	Eastern Conference				
#	Team	W	L	PCT	GB
1	z-Boston Celtics	67	15	.817	–
2	y-Milwaukee Bucks	57	25	.695	10
3	x-Philadelphia 76ers	54	28	.659	13
4	x-Atlanta Hawks	50	32	.610	17
5	x-Detroit Pistons	46	36	.561	21
6	x-Washington Bullets	39	43	.476	28
7	x-New Jersey Nets	39	43	.476	28
8	x-Chicago Bulls	30	52	.366	37
9	Cleveland Cavaliers	29	53	.354	38
10	Indiana Pacers	26	56	.317	41
11	New York Knicks	23	59	.280	44

=== Game log ===
1985–86 game log
Total: 67–15 (Home: 40–1; Road: 27–14)
October: 2–1 (home: 1–0; road: 1–1)

Game	Date	Team	Score	High points	High rebounds	High assists	Location Attendance	Record
1	October 25, 1985	@ New Jersey	L 109–113 (OT)	Bird (21)	Bird (12)	Bird (10)	Brendan Byrne Arena; 13,095	0–1
2	October 26, 1985	@ Cleveland	W 105–100	McHale (21)	McHale (15)	Johnson (5)	Richfield Coliseum; 20,900	1–1
3	October 30, 1985; 7:30 p.m. EST	Milwaukee	W 117–106	McHale (25)	Parish (13)	Ainge, Bird (5)	Boston Garden; 14,890	2–1

November: 13–1 (home: 8–0; road: 5–1)

Game	Date	Team	Score	High points	High rebounds	High assists	Location Attendance	Record
4	November 1, 1985	Atlanta	W 109–105	Bird (25)	McHale (10)	Johnson (9)	Boston Garden; 14,890	3–1
5	November 2, 1985	@ Washington	W 88–73	Ainge (20)	Parish (10)	Bird (8)	Capital Centre; 17,488	4–1
6	November 8, 1985	Phoenix	W 125–101	Parish (25)	Parish (10)	Bird (10)	Boston Garden; 14,890	5–1
7	November 9, 1985	@ Detroit	W 124–105	Bird (29)	McHale (11)	Johnson (7)	Pontiac Silverdome; 25,148	6–1
8	November 13, 1985	Indiana	W 118–114	Johnson (30)	Bird (15)	Bird (7)	Boston Garden; 14,890	7–1
9	November 15, 1985	Washington	W 118–114	Ainge (24)	Bird (11)	Ainge (9)	Boston Garden; 14,890	8–1
10	November 16, 1985	@ Indiana	L 109–111	Bird (33)	Parish (10)	Ainge (7)	Market Square Arena; 16,904	8–2
11	November 20, 1985	Utah	W 115–106 (OT)	Bird (27)	Parish (17)	Ainge (7)	Boston Garden; 14,890	9–2
12	November 22, 1985	Philadelphia	W 110–103	McHale (32)	Parish (12)	Bird (6)	Boston Garden; 14,890	10–2
13	November 23, 1985	@ New York	W 113–104	Parish (27)	Parish (12)	Bird (10)	Madison Square Garden; 19,591	11–2
14	November 26, 1985	@ Philadelphia	W 98–91	Parish (22)	McHale (13)	Bird (11)	The Spectrum; 17,921	12–2
15	November 27, 1985	Detroit	W 132–124	Bird (47)	Bird (12)	Ainge, Johnson (5)	Boston Garden; 14,890	13–2
16	November 29, 1985	New York	W 94–88	Bird (31)	Bird (15)	Johnson (7)	Boston Garden; 14,890	14–2
17	November 30, 1985	@ Atlanta	W 102–97	Bird (28)	McHale (8)	Johnson (8)	The Omni; 13,101	15–2

December: 8–5 (home: 4–1; road: 4–4)

Game	Date	Team	Score	High points	High rebounds	High assists	Location Attendance	Record
18	December 3, 1985; 8:30 p.m. EST	@ Milwaukee	W 112–109	McHale (29)	McHale (10)	Ainge (6)	MECCA Arena; 11,052	16–2
19	December 4, 1985	@ New Jersey	W 130–111	Johnson (23)	Walton (13)	Ainge, Bird, McHale (5)	Brendan Byrne Arena; 15,169	17–2
20	December 6, 1985	Portland	L 103–121	Bird (20)	Bird (11)	Ainge (9)	Boston Garden; 14,890	17–3
21	December 10, 1985	Atlanta (at Hartford, Connecticut)	W 114–110	McHale, Parish (24)	Parish (10)	Johnson (9)	Hartford Civic Center; 14,493	18–3
22	December 11, 1985	Sacramento	W 118–101	Bird (24)	Bird (7)	Ainge, Bird (5)	Boston Garden; 14,890	19–3
23	December 14, 1985	@ Cleveland	L 99–109	Bird (31)	McHale (12)	Ainge (9)	Richfield Coliseum; 15,349	19–4
24	December 15, 1985	Chicago	W 109–104	Bird (34)	Parish (15)	Ainge (9)	Boston Garden; 14,890	20–4
25	December 17, 1985	@ Chicago	L 108–116	Johnson (25)	Parish (15)	Johnson (8)	Chicago Stadium; 13,786	20–5
26	December 18, 1985	Dallas	W 137–117	Bird (35)	McHale (10)	Ainge (13)	Boston Garden; 14,890	21–5
27	December 21, 1985	@ Philadelphia	L 102–108	McHale (34)	McHale (10)	Ainge (9)	The Spectrum; 17,941	21–6
28	December 25, 1985	@ New York	L 104–113 (2OT)	McHale (29)	Parish (18)	Ainge (8)	Madison Square Garden; 17,480	21–7
29	December 28, 1985	@ Utah	W 110–108	Bird, McHale (24)	Parish (10)	Bird (8)	Salt Palace; 12,702	22–7
30	December 30, 1985	@ L.A. Clippers	W 125–103	McHale (22)	McHale (18)	Bird (8)	Los Angeles Memorial Sports Arena; 14,977	23–7

January: 12–1 (home: 7–0; road: 5–1)

Game	Date	Team	Score	High points	High rebounds	High assists	Location Attendance	Record
31	January 2, 1986	@ Indiana	W 122–104	Johnson (29)	Bird (13)	Bird (8)	Market Square Arena; 14,974	24–7
32	January 3, 1986	New Jersey	W 129–117	Bird (29)	Bird (10)	Johnson (8)	Boston Garden; 14,890	25–7
33	January 7, 1986	@ Detroit	L 109–113	McHale (29)	Bird (12)	Bird (8)	Pontiac Silverdome; 17,421	25–8
34	January 8, 1986	Cleveland	W 126–95	Bird (25)	McHale (13)	Bird (7)	Boston Garden; 14,890	26–8
35	January 10, 1986	Atlanta	W 115–108	Bird (29)	Parish (15)	Johnson (8)	Boston Garden; 14,890	27–8
36	January 15, 1986	Denver	W 123–100	McHale (33)	Bird (14)	Bird (9)	Boston Garden; 14,890	28–8
37	January 17, 1986	@ Indiana	W 123–105	McHale (28)	Bird (9)	Bird (8)	Market Square Arena; 16,904	29–8
38	January 18, 1986	@ Atlanta	W 125–122 (OT)	Bird (41)	McHale (12)	Ainge (12)	The Omni; 16,522	30–8
39	January 22, 1986; 8:00 p.m. EST	L.A. Lakers	W 110–95	Johnson (22)	Bird (12)	Ainge (8)	Boston Garden; 14,890	31–8
40	January 24, 1986	Golden State	W 135–114	Bird (25)	Wedman (13)	Johnson (7)	Boston Garden; 14,890	32–8
41	January 26, 1986	Philadelphia	W 105–103	Bird (28)	Bird (14)	Bird (6)	Boston Garden; 14,890	33–8
42	January 30, 1986	@ Chicago	W 101–91	Bird (26)	Parish (16)	Johnson (8)	Chicago Stadium; 15,207	34–8
43	January 31, 1986	@ Washington	W 97–88	Wedman (24)	Parish (14)	Ainge (9)	Capital Centre; 19,123	35–8

February: 11–3 (home: 5–0; road: 6–3)

Game	Date	Team	Score	High points	High rebounds	High assists	Location Attendance	Record
44	February 2, 1986	Seattle	W 114–101	Johnson (24)	Bird (11)	Johnson (7)	Boston Garden; 14,890	36–8
45	February 4, 1986; 8:30 p.m. EST	@ Milwaukee	W 112–93	Bird (24)	Bird (9)	Johnson (8)	MECCA Arena; 11,052	37–8
46	February 5, 1986	Washington	W 103–88	Bird (26)	Walton (17)	Bird, Johnson (6)	Boston Garden; 14,890	38–8
All-Star Break
47	February 11, 1986	@ Sacramento	L 100–105	Bird (29)	Parish (15)	Johnson (5)	ARCO Arena; 10,333	38–9
48	February 13, 1986	@ Seattle	W 107–98	Bird (31)	Bird (15)	Bird (11)	Seattle Center Coliseum; 14,230	39–9
49	February 14, 1986	@ Portland	W 120–119 (OT)	Bird (47)	Bird (14)	Ainge (12)	Memorial Coliseum; 12,666	40–9
50	February 16, 1986; 3:30 p.m. EST	@ L.A. Lakers	W 105–99	Johnson (23)	Bird (18)	Bird (7)	The Forum; 17,505	41–9
51	February 17, 1986	@ Phoenix	L 101–108	Johnson (24)	Parish (11)	Bird, Carlisle, Johnson (3)	Arizona Veterans Memorial Coliseum; 14,519	41–10
52	February 19, 1986	@ Golden State	W 115–100	Bird (36)	Parish (13)	Bird (11)	Oakland-Alameda County Coliseum Arena; 15,011	42–10
53	February 20, 1986	@ Denver	L 100–102	Bird (27)	Bird (16)	Ainge (8)	McNichols Sports Arena; 17,022	42–11
54	February 23, 1986	Indiana (at Hartford, Connecticut)	W 113–98	Bird (30)	Parish (15)	Bird (12)	Hartford Civic Center; 15,124	43–11
55	February 25, 1986	@ New York	W 91–74	Bird (24)	Bird (18)	Bird (13)	Madison Square Garden; 18,329	44–11
56	February 26, 1986	San Antonio	W 120–100	Parish (27)	Parish (10)	Bird (9)	Boston Garden; 14,890	45–11
57	February 28, 1986	L.A. Clippers	W 124–108	Parish (26)	Bird (13)	Bird (12)	Boston Garden; 14,890	46–11

March: 15–2 (home: 11–0; road: 4–2)

Game	Date	Team	Score	High points	High rebounds	High assists	Location Attendance	Record
58	March 2, 1986	Detroit	W 129–109	Bird (35)	Bird (9)	Johnson (8)	Boston Garden; 14,890	47–11
59	March 4, 1986	@ Chicago	W 106–94	McHale (23)	Parish (11)	Johnson (8)	Chicago Stadium; 14,172	48–11
60	March 5, 1986	Chicago	W 108–97	Bird (26)	Parish (15)	Ainge (10)	Boston Garden; 14,890	49–11
61	March 7, 1986	New York	W 115–108	McHale (20)	Walton (12)	Ainge, Bird (8)	Boston Garden; 14,890	50–11
62	March 8, 1986	@ Washington	L 108–110 (OT)	Bird (24)	Parish (25)	Bird (8)	Capital Centre; 19,123	50–12
63	March 10, 1986	@ Dallas	L 115–116	Bird (50)	Parish (16)	Johnson (6)	Reunion Arena; 17,007	50–13
64	March 11, 1986; 8:30 p.m. EST	@ Houston	W 116–104	Bird (31)	Walton (16)	Bird (10)	The Summit; 16,016	51–13
65	March 13, 1986	@ San Antonio	W 135–119	Bird (33)	Bird (11)	Johnson (7)	HemisFair Arena; 14,180	52–13
66	March 14, 1986	@ Atlanta	W 121–114	Bird (26)	McHale (12)	Johnson (9)	The Omni; 16,522	53–13
67	March 16, 1986	Philadelphia	W 118–101	Bird (36)	Bird (14)	Johnson (7)	Boston Garden; 14,890	54–13
68	March 18, 1986	Cleveland (at Hartford, Connecticut)	W 126–96	Bird (43)	Parish (12)	Johnson (11)	Hartford Civic Center; 15,134	55–13
69	March 19, 1986	Indiana	W 127–108	Parish (28)	Parish (17)	Johnson (8)	Boston Garden; 14,890	56–13
70	March 21, 1986	Chicago	W 126–105	Bird (32)	Parish (14)	Johnson (9)	Boston Garden; 14,890	57–13
71	March 24, 1986; 8:00 p.m. EST	Houston	W 114–107	Bird (36)	Johnson, McHale, Parish (8)	Johnson (12)	Boston Garden; 14,890	58–13
72	March 26, 1986; 7:30 p.m. EST	Milwaukee	W 121–115	Bird (35)	Bird (12)	Bird, Johnson (6)	Boston Garden; 14,890	59–13
73	March 28, 1986	Washington	W 116–97	Bird (27)	Bird, Walton (12)	Johnson (9)	Boston Garden; 14,890	60–13
74	March 30, 1986	New Jersey	W 122–117	Bird (40)	Parish (14)	Johnson (10)	Boston Garden; 14,890	61–13

April: 6–2 (home: 4–0; road: 2–2)

Game	Date	Team	Score	High points	High rebounds	High assists	Location Attendance	Record
75	April 1, 1986	@ Cleveland	W 123–105	Johnson (21)	Walton (11)	Johnson (7)	Richfield Coliseum; 17,495	62–13
76	April 2, 1986	Detroit	W 122–106	Parish (30)	Parish (18)	Bird (13)	Boston Garden; 14,890	63–13
77	April 4, 1986	New York	W 119–98	McHale (25)	McHale (11)	Bird (8)	Boston Garden; 14,890	64–13
78	April 6, 1986	@ Philadelphia	L 94–95	Johnson (22)	Parish (11)	Bird (10)	The Spectrum; 17,941	64–14
79	April 8, 1986; 8:30 p.m. EST	@ Milwaukee	W 126–114	Walton (22)	Bird (14)	Bird (7)	MECCA Arena; 11,052	65–14
80	April 9, 1986	@ New Jersey	L 98–108	McHale (18)	Bird (10)	McHale (8)	Brendan Byrne Arena; 18,092	65–15
81	April 11, 1986	Cleveland	W 117–104	McHale (30)	Parish (9)	Bird (8)	Boston Garden; 14,890	66–15
82	April 13, 1986	New Jersey	W 135–107	Bird (26)	Parish (13)	Ainge, Johnson (4)	Boston Garden; 14,890	67–15

1985–86 schedule

== Player stats ==
Note: GP= Games played; REB= Rebounds; AST= Assists; STL = Steals; BLK = Blocks; PTS = Points; AVG = Average

Player	GP	REB	AST	STL	BLK	PTS	AVG
Larry Bird	82	805	557	166	51	2115	25.8
Kevin McHale	68	551	181	29	134	1448	21.3
Robert Parish	81	770	145	65	116	1305	16.1
Dennis Johnson	78	268	456	110	35	1213	15.6
Danny Ainge	80	235	405	94	7	855	10.7
Scott Wedman	79	192	82	38	22	634	8.0
Bill Walton	80	544	165	38	106	606	7.6
Jerry Sichting	82	104	188	50	0	537	6.5
David Thirdkill	49	70	15	11	3	163	3.3
Sam Vincent	57	48	69	17	4	184	3.2
Sly Williams	6	15	2	1	1	17	2.8
Rick Carlisle	77	77	104	19	4	199	2.6
Greg Kite	64	128	17	3	28	83	1.3

== Playoffs ==
1986 playoff game log
Eastern Conference First Round: 3–0 (home: 2–0; road: 1–0)

Game	Date	Team	Score	High points	High rebounds	High assists	Location Attendance	Series
1	April 17, 1986	Chicago	W 123–104	Bird (30)	McHale, Parish (10)	Bird (8)	Boston Garden; 14,890	1–0
2	April 20, 1986	Chicago	W 135–131 (2OT)	Bird (36)	McHale, Walton (15)	Bird, Johnson (8)	Boston Garden; 14,890	2–0
3	April 22, 1986	@ Chicago	W 122–104	McHale (31)	Walton (9)	Bird (8)	Chicago Stadium; 18,968	3–0

Eastern Conference Semifinals: 4–1 (home: 3–0; road: 1–1)

Game	Date	Team	Score	High points	High rebounds	High assists	Location Attendance	Series
1	April 27, 1986; 1:00 p.m. EDT	Atlanta	W 103–91	McHale (24)	Bird (12)	Johnson (14)	Boston Garden; 14,890	1–0
2	April 29, 1986; 8:30 p.m. EDT	Atlanta	W 119–108	Bird (36)	McHale (9)	Johnson (9)	Boston Garden; 14,890	2–0
3	May 2, 1986; 7:30 p.m. EDT	@ Atlanta	W 111–107	Bird (28)	Parish (14)	Bird (12)	The Omni; 12,357	3–0
4	May 4, 1986; 1:00 p.m. EDT	@ Atlanta	L 94–106	McHale (26)	McHale (12)	Bird (5)	The Omni; 12,357	3–1
5	May 6, 1986; 7:30 p.m. EDT	Atlanta	W 132–99	Bird (36)	Parish (13)	Johnson (8)	Boston Garden; 14,890	4–1

Eastern Conference Finals: 4–0 (home: 2–0; road: 2–0)

Game	Date	Team	Score	High points	High rebounds	High assists	Location Attendance	Series
1	May 13, 1986; 8:00 p.m. EDT	Milwaukee	W 128–96	Bird (26)	Ainge (10)	Sichting (8)	Boston Garden; 14,890	1–0
2	May 15, 1986; 8:00 p.m. EDT	Milwaukee	W 122–111	Bird (26)	Parish (9)	Bird (9)	Boston Garden; 14,890	2–0
3	May 17, 1986; 2:00 p.m. EDT	@ Milwaukee	W 111–107	McHale (29)	Bird (16)	Bird (13)	MECCA Arena; 11,052	3–0
4	May 18, 1986; 3:30 p.m. EDT	@ Milwaukee	W 111–98	Bird (30)	McHale (11)	Ainge, Bird (5)	MECCA Arena; 11,052	4–0

NBA Finals: 4–2 (home: 3–0; road: 1–2)

Game	Date	Team	Score	High points	High rebounds	High assists	Location Attendance	Series
1	May 26, 1986; 3:00 p.m. EDT	Houston	W 112–100	Parish (23)	Johnson (11)	Bird (13)	Boston Garden; 14,890	1–0
2	May 29, 1986; 9:00 p.m. EDT	Houston	W 117–95	Bird (31)	Bird (8)	Bird (7)	Boston Garden; 14,890	2–0
3	June 1, 1986; 3:30 p.m. EDT	@ Houston	L 104–106	McHale (28)	Bird (15)	Bird (11)	The Summit; 16,016	2–1
4	June 3, 1986; 9:00 p.m. EDT	@ Houston	W 106–103	Parish (22)	Parish (15)	Bird (10)	The Summit; 16,016	3–1
5	June 5, 1986; 9:00 p.m. EDT	@ Houston	L 96–111	McHale (33)	McHale (8)	Ainge (5)	The Summit; 16,016	3–2
6	June 8, 1986; 1:00 p.m. EDT	Houston	W 114–97	Bird (29)	Bird (11)	Bird (12)	Boston Garden; 14,890	4–2

1986 schedule

Following the conclusion of the 1986 NBA Finals, a video documentary of the 1986 NBA season, known as Sweet Sixteen, was released. David Perry was the narrator after Dick Stockton had narrated the last three NBA season documentaries.

== Roster ==
1985–86 Boston Celtics roster
Players

Pos.	No.	Player	Height	Weight	DOB	From
SG	44	Danny Ainge	6 ft 5 in (1.96 m)	175 lb (79 kg)	1959-03-17	BYU
SF	33	Larry Bird	6 ft 9 in (2.06 m)	220 lb (100 kg)	1956-12-07	Indiana State
SG	34	Rick Carlisle	6 ft 5 in (1.96 m)	210 lb (95 kg)	1959-10-27	Virginia
PG	3	Dennis Johnson	6 ft 4 in (1.93 m)	185 lb (84 kg)	1954-09-18	Pepperdine
C	50	Greg Kite	6 ft 11 in (2.11 m)	250 lb (113 kg)	1961-08-05	BYU
PF	32	Kevin McHale	6 ft 10 in (2.08 m)	210 lb (95 kg)	1957-12-19	Minnesota
C	00	Robert Parish	7 ft 1 in (2.16 m)	230 lb (104 kg)	1953-08-30	Centenary
PG	12	Jerry Sichting	6 ft 1 in (1.85 m)	168 lb (76 kg)	1956-11-29	Purdue
SF	45	David Thirdkill	6 ft 7 in (2.01 m)	195 lb (88 kg)	1960-04-12	Bradley
PG	11	Sam Vincent	6 ft 2 in (1.88 m)	185 lb (84 kg)	1963-05-18	Michigan State
C	5	Bill Walton	6 ft 11 in (2.11 m)	235 lb (107 kg)	1952-11-05	UCLA
SF	8	Scott Wedman	6 ft 7 in (2.01 m)	215 lb (98 kg)	1952-07-29	Colorado
SG	35	Sly Williams	6 ft 7 in (2.01 m)	210 lb (95 kg)	1958-01-26	Rhode Island

Coaches
Head coach
- K. C. Jones
Assistant(s)
- Ed Badger
- Chris Ford
- Jimmy Rodgers

Legend
- (DP) Unsigned draft pick
- (FA) Free agent
- (S) Suspended
- Injured

Roster

== Award winners ==
- Larry Bird, Associated Press Athlete of the Year
- Larry Bird, NBA Most Valuable Player Award
- Larry Bird, NBA Finals Most Valuable Player Award
- Larry Bird, All-NBA First Team
- Kevin McHale, All-NBA Defensive First Team
- Dennis Johnson, All-NBA Defensive Second Team
- Bill Walton, NBA Sixth Man of the Year Award
- Larry Bird, NBA 3-Point Shootout champion
- Larry Bird, three-point field goal leader
