= Micheal Williams =

American basketball player (born 1966)

Personal information
- Born: July 23, 1966 (age 60) Dallas, Texas, U.S.
- Listed height: 6 ft 2 in (1.88 m)
- Listed weight: 175 lb (79 kg)

Career information
- High school: David W. Carter (Dallas, Texas)
- College: Baylor (1984–1988)
- NBA draft: 1988: 2nd round, 48th overall pick
- Drafted by: Detroit Pistons
- Playing career: 1988–1999
- Position: Point guard
- Number: 24, 21, 4, 14

Career history
- 1988–1989: Detroit Pistons
- 1989: Phoenix Suns
- 1989–1990: Rapid City Thrillers
- 1990: Charlotte Hornets
- 1990–1992: Indiana Pacers
- 1992–1998: Minnesota Timberwolves
- 1999: Toronto Raptors

Career highlights
- NBA champion (1989); NBA All-Defensive Second Team (1992); 2× First-team All-SWC (1987, 1988)

Career statistics
- Points: 4,533 (11.0 ppg)
- Assists: 2,385 (5.8 apg)
- Steals: 717 (1.7 spg)
- Stats at NBA.com
- Stats at Basketball Reference

Micheal Douglas Williams (born July 23, 1966) is an American former professional basketball player who played the point guard position in the National Basketball Association (NBA). He holds the NBA record for most consecutive free throws made with 97.

== NBA career ==
Out of Baylor University, Williams was selected with the 48th overall pick in the 1988 NBA draft by the Detroit Pistons with whom he played 49 games in his rookie season, averaging 2.4 points and 1.4 assists per game. The Pistons won the NBA championship in his rookie year.

Williams was traded by Detroit to the Phoenix Suns on draft day of 1989, along with the Pistons' first-round draft pick (27th overall) of the 1989 NBA draft, Kenny Battle, in exchange for the Suns' first-round draft choice (24th overall pick), Anthony Cook. That NBA season was spent split between the Phoenix Suns and the Charlotte Hornets averaging 5.6 points and 2.9 assists per game. He also played 23 games for the Rapid City Thrillers of the Continental Basketball Association (CBA). He was acquired by the Indiana Pacers in 1990.

He thrived during his two seasons in Indiana, averaging 13.2 points, 6.5 assists and shooting 87.5% from the free-throw line. Prior to the 1992–93 season, he was traded along with Chuck Person to the Minnesota Timberwolves in exchange for Sam Mitchell and Pooh Richardson. He continued his solid play in Minnesota for the following two seasons but, due to various injuries, in his final four years with the Wolves he participated in just 35 games (including missing the entire 1996–97 season). On January 21, 1999, Minnesota traded him, along with Željko Rebrača, to the Toronto Raptors in a three-team deal. By then his career was on the decline, and he only played two games for the Raptors before retiring that year.

At the conclusion of 1992–93, Williams ranked fourth in the league in free-throw accuracy at 90.7 percent after making his final 84 attempts. In the process, he broke Calvin Murphy's 1981 record of 78 successive free throws, continuing his streak into the following season (1993–94), making his first 13 attempts. As of 2025 he still holds the NBA record for consecutive free throws made during the regular season at 97, spanning 19 regular-season games from March 24 to November 9, 1993.

== Career statistics ==
Legend
GP	Games played	GS	Games started	MPG	Minutes per game
FG%	Field goal percentage	3P%	3-point field goal percentage	FT%	Free throw percentage
RPG	Rebounds per game	APG	Assists per game	SPG	Steals per game
BPG	Blocks per game	PPG	Points per game	**Bold**	Career high
†	Won an NBA championship

=== NBA ===
==== Regular season ====
Year	Team	GP	GS	MPG	FG%	3P%	FT%	RPG	APG	SPG	BPG	PPG
1988–89†	Detroit	49	0	7.3	.364	.222	.660	.6	1.4	.3	.1	2.6
1989–90	Phoenix	6	0	4.3	.200	—	.500	.2	.7	.0	.0	.8
1989–90	Charlotte	22	1	13.8	**.532**	.000	.795	1.4	3.5	1.0	.0	6.9
1990–91	Indiana	73	37	23.4	.499	.143	.879	2.4	4.8	2.1	.2	11.1
1991–92	Indiana	**79**	**76**	34.8	.490	.242	.871	**3.6**	8.2	**2.9**	**.3**	15.0
1992–93	Minnesota	76	**76**	**35.0**	.446	.243	.907	**3.6**	**8.7**	2.2	**.3**	**15.1**
1993–94	Minnesota	71	66	31.1	.457	.222	.839	3.1	7.2	1.7	**.3**	13.7
1994–95	Minnesota	1	1	28.0	.250	—	.800	1.0	3.0	2.0	.0	6.0
1995–96	Minnesota	9	7	21.0	.325	**.333**	.848	2.6	3.4	.6	**.3**	6.1
1997–98	Minnesota	25	0	6.4	.333	.000	**.970**	.6	1.3	.4	.1	2.6
1998–99	Toronto	2	0	7.5	.200	—	—	.5	.0	.0	.0	1.0
Career		413	264	25.2	.464	.227	.868	2.5	5.8	1.7	.2	11.0

==== Playoffs ====
Year	Team	GP	GS	MPG	FG%	3P%	FT%	RPG	APG	SPG	BPG	PPG
1989†	Detroit	4	0	1.5	—	—	**1.000**	.5	.5	.3	.0	.5
1991	Indiana	**5**	**5**	**36.6**	**.462**	.000	.896	**3.2**	**8.4**	2.8	.0	**20.6**
1992	Indiana	3	3	35.3	.419	.333	.733	2.7	8.0	**3.0**	.0	16.7
1998	Minnesota	4	0	14.3	.400	**.500**	.778	2.3	2.8	.8	**.3**	5.0
Career		16	8	22.0	.439	.333	.851	2.2	4.9	1.7	.1	10.9

== See also ==
- List of NBA career free throw percentage leaders
- List of NBA single-season steals per game leaders
