= 1991–92 Miami Heat season =

NBA professional basketball team season

- Head coach: Kevin Loughery
- General manager: Lewis Schaffel
- Owners: Ted Arison; Billy Cunningham; Lewis Schaffel
- Arena: Miami Arena

Results
- Record: 38–44 (.463)
- Place: Division: 4th (Atlantic); Conference: 8th (Eastern)
- Playoff finish: First round (lost to Bulls 0–3)
- Stats at Basketball Reference

Local media
- Television: WBFS-TV; SportsChannel Florida (Eric Reid, Dave Wohl)
- Radio: WQAM (Eric Reid, Dave Wohl); WRFM (Jose Paneda, Jorge Cunill)

The 1991–92 Miami Heat season was the fourth season for the Miami Heat in the National Basketball Association.

== Season summary ==
=== Off-season ===
The Heat received the fifth overall pick in the 1991 NBA draft, and selected shooting guard Steve Smith out of Michigan State University. During the off-season, the team hired Kevin Loughery as their new head coach.

=== Regular season ===
Under Loughery and with the addition of Smith, the Heat got off to a fast start by winning seven of their first ten games of the regular season. However, the team soon fell below .500 in winning percentage by losing eight of their next nine games, as Sherman Douglas only played just five games due to poor conditioning; the Heat soon traded Douglas to the Boston Celtics in exchange for Brian Shaw in January. With the addition of Shaw, the team continued to play below .500 as they held a 23–25 record at the All-Star break. However, despite playing under .500 for the remainder of the season, the Heat finished in fourth place in the Atlantic Division with a 38–44 record, winning a tie-breaker for the eighth seed in the Eastern Conference over the Atlanta Hawks, and qualifying for their first ever NBA playoff appearance in franchise history.

Glen Rice averaged 22.3 points and 5.0 rebounds per game, and led the Heat with 155 three-point field goals, while Rony Seikaly averaged 16.4 points, 11.8 rebounds and 1.5 blocks per game, and Grant Long provided the team with 14.8 points, 8.4 rebounds and 1.7 steals per game. In addition, Smith contributed 12.0 points and 4.6 assists per game, and was named to the NBA All-Rookie First Team, while second-year forward Willie Burton provided with 11.2 points per game. Off the bench, Kevin Edwards averaged 10.1 points and 1.2 steals per game, while second-year guard Bimbo Coles contributed 10.1 points and 4.5 assists per game, second-year forward Alec Kessler provided with 5.3 points and 4.1 rebounds per game, and second-year forward Keith Askins averaged 3.7 points per game.

The Heat also posted a very successful 28–13 home record at the Miami Arena during the regular season, but struggled on the road with a 10–31 record away from home. Despite a stellar season, Rice was not selected for the 1992 NBA All-Star Game in Orlando, Florida. Rice finished tied in fourth place in Most Improved Player voting, while Long finished tied in eighth place, and Loughery finished tied in ninth place in Coach of the Year voting.

The Heat finished 15th in the NBA in home-game attendance, with an attendance of 613,583 at the Miami Arena during the regular season.

=== NBA playoffs ===
In the Eastern Conference First Round of the 1992 NBA playoffs, the Heat faced off against the top–seeded, and defending NBA champion Chicago Bulls, who won the Central Division title, and were led by the trio of All-Star guard, and Most Valuable Player of the Year, Michael Jordan, All-Star forward Scottie Pippen, and Horace Grant. The Heat lost the first two games to the Bulls on the road at the Chicago Stadium, before losing Game 3 at home, 119–114 at the Miami Arena, in which Jordan scored 56 points; the Heat lost the series to the Bulls in a three-game sweep.

The Bulls would go on to defeat the Portland Trail Blazers in six games in the 1992 NBA Finals, winning their second consecutive NBA championship.

=== Notable highlights ===
On December 17, 1991, the Heat suffered a 68-point road loss to the Cleveland Cavaliers, 148–80 at the Coliseum at Richfield, as the Cavaliers had set an NBA record with the second largest margin of victory in a game.

=== Aftermath ===
Following the season, Jon Sundvold was released to free agency.

== Draft picks ==
Round	Pick	Player	Position	Nationality	School/Club team
1	5	Steve Smith	SG	United States	Michigan State
2	29	George Ackles	C/PF	United States	UNLV

== Roster ==
1991–92 Miami Heat roster
Players

Pos.	No.	Player	Height	Weight	DOB	From
SF	2	Keith Askins	6 ft 7 in (2.01 m)	197 lb (89 kg)	1967–12–15	Alabama
SF	30	Winston Bennett	6 ft 7 in (2.01 m)	210 lb (95 kg)	1965–02–09	Kentucky
SF	34	Willie Burton	6 ft 8 in (2.03 m)	210 lb (95 kg)	1968–05–26	Minnesota
PG	12	Bimbo Coles	6 ft 1 in (1.85 m)	180 lb (82 kg)	1968–04–22	Virginia Tech
PG	21	Kevin Edwards	6 ft 3 in (1.91 m)	190 lb (86 kg)	1965–10–30	DePaul
C	33	Alec Kessler	6 ft 11 in (2.11 m)	230 lb (104 kg)	1967–01–13	Georgia
PF	43	Grant Long	6 ft 8 in (2.03 m)	225 lb (102 kg)	1966–03–12	Eastern Michigan
PG	23	John Morton	6 ft 3 in (1.91 m)	180 lb (82 kg)	1967–05–18	Seton Hall
C	53	Alan Ogg	7 ft 2 in (2.18 m)	240 lb (109 kg)	1967–07–05	UAB
SF	41	Glen Rice	6 ft 7 in (2.01 m)	215 lb (98 kg)	1967–05–28	Michigan
C	4	Rony Seikaly	6 ft 11 in (2.11 m)	230 lb (104 kg)	1965–05–10	Syracuse
SG	22	Brian Shaw	6 ft 6 in (1.98 m)	190 lb (86 kg)	1966–03–22	UC Santa Barbara
SG	3	Steve Smith	6 ft 7 in (2.01 m)	200 lb (91 kg)	1969–03–31	Michigan State
PG	20	Jon Sundvold	6 ft 2 in (1.88 m)	170 lb (77 kg)	1961–07–02	Missouri

Coaches
Head coach
- Kevin Loughery
Assistant(s)
- Alvin Gentry
- Bob Staak

Legend
- (DP) Unsigned draft pick
- (FA) Free agent
- (S) Suspended
- Injured

Roster
Updated: April 10, 1992

== Regular season ==
=== Season standings ===
Atlantic Division	W	L	PCT	GB	Home	Road	Div
y-Boston Celtics	51	31	.622	—	34–7	17–24	19–9
x-New York Knicks	51	31	.622	—	30–11	21–20	20–8
x-New Jersey Nets	40	42	.488	11	25–16	15–26	15–13
x-Miami Heat	38	44	.463	13	28–13	10–31	14–14
Philadelphia 76ers	35	47	.427	16	23–18	12–29	15–13
Washington Bullets	25	57	.305	26	14–27	11–30	7–21
Orlando Magic	21	61	.256	30	13–28	8–33	8–20

y – clinched division title
x – clinched playoff spot

#	Eastern Conference				
#	Team	W	L	PCT	GB
1	z-Chicago Bulls	67	15	.817	–
2	y-Boston Celtics	51	31	.622	16
3	x-Cleveland Cavaliers	57	25	.695	10
4	x-New York Knicks	51	31	.622	16
5	x-Detroit Pistons	48	34	.585	19
6	x-New Jersey Nets	40	42	.488	27
7	x-Indiana Pacers	40	42	.488	27
8	x-Miami Heat	38	44	.463	29
9	Atlanta Hawks	38	44	.463	29
10	Philadelphia 76ers	35	47	.427	32
11	Milwaukee Bucks	31	51	.378	36
12	Charlotte Hornets	31	51	.378	36
13	Washington Bullets	25	57	.305	42
14	Orlando Magic	21	61	.256	46

z – clinched division title
y – clinched division title
x – clinched playoff spot

== Playoffs ==
1992 playoff game log
First Round: 0–3 (home: 0–1; road: 0–2)

Game	Date	Team	Score	High points	High rebounds	High assists	Location Attendance	Series
1	April 24	@ Chicago	L 94–113	Steve Smith (19)	Rony Seikaly (11)	Steve Smith (7)	Chicago Stadium; 18,676	0–1
2	April 26	@ Chicago	L 90–120	Rony Seikaly (26)	Rony Seikaly (7)	Bimbo Coles (4)	Chicago Stadium; 18,676	0–2
3	April 29	Chicago	L 114–119	Glen Rice (25)	Rony Seikaly (12)	Shaw, Smith (6)	Miami Arena; 15,008	0–3

1992 schedule

== Player statistics ==
=== Ragular season ===
Player	POS	GP	GS	MP	REB	AST	STL	BLK	PTS	MPG	RPG	APG	SPG	BPG	PPG
Grant Long	PF	82	82	3,063	691	225	139	40	1,212	37.4	8.4	2.7	1.7	.5	14.8
Bimbo Coles	PG	81	28	1,976	189	366	73	13	816	24.4	2.3	4.5	.9	.2	10.1
Kevin Edwards	PG	81	1	1,840	211	170	99	20	819	22.7	2.6	2.1	1.2	.2	10.1
Glen Rice	SF	79	79	3,007	394	184	90	35	1,765	38.1	5.0	2.3	1.1	.4	22.3
Rony Seikaly	C	79	78	2,800	934	109	40	121	1,296	35.4	11.8	1.4	.5	1.5	16.4
Alec Kessler	PF	77	4	1,197	314	34	17	32	410	15.5	4.1	.4	.2	.4	5.3
Willie Burton	SF	68	50	1,585	244	123	46	37	762	23.3	3.6	1.8	.7	.5	11.2
Steve Smith	SG	61	59	1,806	188	278	59	19	729	29.6	3.1	4.6	1.0	.3	12.0
Keith Askins	SF	59	4	843	142	38	40	15	219	14.3	2.4	.6	.7	.3	3.7
Brian Shaw^{†}	PG	46	23	987	135	161	45	12	320	21.5	2.9	3.5	1.0	.3	7.0
Alan Ogg	C	43	0	367	74	7	5	28	108	8.5	1.7	.2	.1	.7	2.5
John Morton^{†}	SF	21	0	216	19	27	12	1	92	10.3	.9	1.3	.6	.0	4.4
Miloš Babić	C	9	0	35	11	6	1	0	18	3.9	1.2	.7	.1	.0	2.0
Sherman Douglas^{†}	PG	5	2	98	6	19	4	0	37	19.6	1.2	3.8	.8	.0	7.4
Jon Sundvold	PG	3	0	8	0	2	0	0	3	2.7	.0	.7	.0	.0	1.0
Winston Bennett^{†}	SF	2	0	2	1	0	0	0	2	1.0	.5	.0	.0	.0	1.0

- ^{†} Denotes player spent time with another team in the season. Stats reflect time with the Heat only.

=== Playoffs ===
Player	POS	GP	GS	MP	REB	AST	STL	BLK	PTS	MPG	RPG	APG	SPG	BPG	PPG
Grant Long	PF	3	3	120	15	8	5	0	37	40.0	5.0	2.7	1.7	.0	12.3
Glen Rice	SF	3	3	119	10	5	2	0	57	39.7	3.3	1.7	.7	.0	19.0
Rony Seikaly	C	3	3	117	30	4	1	5	62	39.0	10.0	1.3	.3	1.7	20.7
Steve Smith	SG	3	3	100	6	15	4	1	48	33.3	2.0	5.0	1.3	.3	16.0
Brian Shaw	PG	3	3	85	13	12	2	0	36	28.3	4.3	4.0	.7	.0	12.0
Kevin Edwards	PG	3	0	55	7	7	2	0	15	18.3	2.3	2.3	.7	.0	5.0
Keith Askins	SF	3	0	48	9	3	1	0	13	16.0	3.0	1.0	.3	.0	4.3
Bimbo Coles	PG	3	0	45	7	6	3	0	23	15.0	2.3	2.0	1.0	.0	7.7
Alan Ogg	C	3	0	15	1	0	1	3	3	5.0	.3	.0	.3	1.0	1.0
Alec Kessler	PF	2	0	12	1	0	0	0	2	6.0	.5	.0	.0	.0	1.0
John Morton	SF	1	0	2	0	0	0	0	2	2.0	.0	.0	.0	.0	2.0
Jon Sundvold	PG	1	0	2	0	0	0	0	0	2.0	.0	.0	.0	.0	.0

== Awards and records ==
- Steve Smith, NBA All-Rookie Team 1st Team
