= 1991–92 Orlando Magic season =

NBA professional basketball team season

- Head coach: Matt Guokas
- Arena: Orlando Arena

Results
- Record: 21–61 (.256)
- Place: Division: 7th (Atlantic); Conference: 14th (Eastern)
- Playoff finish: Did not qualify
- Stats at Basketball Reference

Local media
- Television: WKCF; Sunshine Network (Chip Caray, Jack Givens, Paul Kennedy)
- Radio: WWZN (David Steele)

The 1991–92 Orlando Magic season was the third season for the Orlando Magic in the National Basketball Association. The city of Orlando, Florida hosted the NBA All-Star weekend at the Orlando Arena this season, which featured the 1992 NBA All-Star Game.

== Season summary ==
=== Off-season ===
After playing in the Midwest Division in the Western Conference the previous season, the Magic returned to the Eastern Conference, and moved into the Atlantic Division this season. The team received the tenth overall pick in the 1991 NBA draft, and selected center Brian Williams from the University of Arizona, and also selected center Stanley Roberts out of Louisiana State University with the 23rd overall pick. In December, the team signed free agent Anthony Bowie, then later on signed Sean Higgins at mid-season.

=== Regular season ===
With the addition of Williams and Roberts, the Magic got off to a fast start by winning their first three games of the regular season, but then lost eight of their next eleven games, leading to a 6–8 start at the end of November. The team soon struggled by posting a dreadful 17-game losing streak between December and January, while suffering a winless month in December losing all 15 games that month, and later on held a 12–36 record at the All-Star break. Second-year star Dennis Scott only played just 18 games due to a right leg injury, which included an inflamed tendon that stretched from his hip to his knee, as he later on underwent season-ending knee surgery. Meanwhile, Nick Anderson only played 60 games due to two broken bones near his right eye, after being punched at a rap concert at the Orlando Arena in February. The Magic posted a seven-game losing streak between February and March, and finished in last place in the Atlantic Division with a 21–61 record.

Anderson averaged 19.9 points, 6.4 rebounds and 1.6 steals per game, while Scott also averaged 19.9 points per game, and Terry Catledge provided the team with 14.8 points and 7.0 rebounds per game. In addition, Bowie contributed 14.6 points per game, while Scott Skiles provided with 12.1 points and 7.3 assists per game, Jerry Reynolds averaged 12.1 points per game in 46 games, and Sam Vincent contributed 10.5 points and 3.8 assists per game in 39 games. Meanwhile, Roberts averaged 10.4 points, 6.1 rebounds and 1.5 blocks per game in 55 games, and was named to the NBA All-Rookie Second Team, Williams provided with 9.1 points and 5.7 rebounds per game in 49 games, Higgins contributed 8.6 points per game in 32 games, Jeff Turner averaged 7.1 points and 3.3 rebounds per game, and Otis Smith contributed 5.6 points per game. On the defensive side, Greg Kite averaged 3.2 points and 5.6 rebounds per game, and Mark Acres provided with 3.1 points and 3.7 rebounds per game.

During the NBA All-Star weekend at the Orlando Arena in Orlando, Anderson participated in the NBA Slam Dunk Contest. The Magic finished 13th in the NBA in home-game attendance, with an attendance of 621,191 at the Orlando Arena during the regular season.

=== Aftermath ===
Following the season, Roberts was traded to the Los Angeles Clippers in a three-team trade, while Vincent was traded to the Milwaukee Bucks, and Reynolds, Smith and Acres were all released to free agency.

== Draft picks ==
Round	Pick	Player	Position	Nationality	School/Club team
1	10	Brian Williams	PF/C	United States	Arizona
1	23	Stanley Roberts	C	United States	LSU
2	36	Chris Corchiani	PG	United States	North Carolina State

== Roster ==
1991–92 Orlando Magic roster
Players

Pos.	No.	Player	Height	Weight	DOB	From
C	42	Mark Acres	6 ft 11 in (2.11 m)	220 lb (100 kg)	1962–11–15	Oral Roberts
SG	25	Nick Anderson	6 ft 6 in (1.98 m)	205 lb (93 kg)	1968–01–20	Illinois
SG	14	Anthony Bowie	6 ft 6 in (1.98 m)	190 lb (86 kg)	1963–11–09	Oklahoma
PF	33	Terry Catledge	6 ft 8 in (2.03 m)	220 lb (100 kg)	1963–08–22	South Alabama
PG	13	Chris Corchiani	6 ft 0 in (1.83 m)	185 lb (84 kg)	1968–03–28	NC State
SF	15	Sean Higgins	6 ft 9 in (2.06 m)	205 lb (93 kg)	1968–12–30	Michigan
C	34	Greg Kite	6 ft 11 in (2.11 m)	250 lb (113 kg)	1961–08–05	BYU
SF	35	Jerry Reynolds	6 ft 8 in (2.03 m)	200 lb (91 kg)	1962–12–23	LSU
C	53	Stanley Roberts	7 ft 0 in (2.13 m)	285 lb (129 kg)	1970–02–07	LSU
SF	3	Dennis Scott (injured)	6 ft 8 in (2.03 m)	229 lb (104 kg)	1968–09–05	Georgia Tech
PG	4	Scott Skiles	6 ft 1 in (1.85 m)	180 lb (82 kg)	1964–03–05	Michigan State
SG	32	Otis Smith	6 ft 5 in (1.96 m)	210 lb (95 kg)	1964–01–30	Jacksonville
PF	31	Jeff Turner	6 ft 9 in (2.06 m)	230 lb (104 kg)	1962–04–09	Vanderbilt
PF	8	Brian Williams	6 ft 11 in (2.11 m)	260 lb (118 kg)	1969–04–06	Arizona
PG	11	Sam Vincent	6 ft 2 in (1.88 m)	185 lb (84 kg)	1963–05–18	Michigan State

Coaches
Head coach
- Matt Guokas
Assistant(s)
- John Gabriel
- Brian Hill

Legend
- (DP) Unsigned draft pick
- (FA) Free agent
- (S) Suspended
- Injured

Roster
Updated: April 18, 1992

== Regular season ==
=== Season standings ===
Atlantic Division	W	L	PCT	GB	Home	Road	Div
y-Boston Celtics	51	31	.622	—	34–7	17–24	19–9
x-New York Knicks	51	31	.622	—	30–11	21–20	20–8
x-New Jersey Nets	40	42	.488	11	25–16	15–26	15–13
x-Miami Heat	38	44	.463	13	28–13	10–31	14–14
Philadelphia 76ers	35	47	.427	16	23–18	12–29	15–13
Washington Bullets	25	57	.305	26	14–27	11–30	7–21
Orlando Magic	21	61	.256	30	13–28	8–33	8–20

y – clinched division title
x – clinched playoff spot

#	Eastern Conference				
#	Team	W	L	PCT	GB
1	z-Chicago Bulls	67	15	.817	–
2	y-Boston Celtics	51	31	.622	16
3	x-Cleveland Cavaliers	57	25	.695	10
4	x-New York Knicks	51	31	.622	16
5	x-Detroit Pistons	48	34	.585	19
6	x-New Jersey Nets	40	42	.488	27
7	x-Indiana Pacers	40	42	.488	27
8	x-Miami Heat	38	44	.463	29
9	Atlanta Hawks	38	44	.463	29
10	Philadelphia 76ers	35	47	.427	32
11	Milwaukee Bucks	31	51	.378	36
12	Charlotte Hornets	31	51	.378	36
13	Washington Bullets	25	57	.305	42
14	Orlando Magic	21	61	.256	46

z – clinched division title
y – clinched division title
x – clinched playoff spot

== Player statistics ==
=== Regular season ===
Player	POS	GP	GS	MP	REB	AST	STL	BLK	PTS	MPG	RPG	APG	SPG	BPG	PPG
Terry Catledge	PF	78	67	2,430	549	109	58	16	1,154	31.2	7.0	1.4	.7	.2	14.8
Scott Skiles	PG	75	63	2,377	202	544	74	5	1,057	31.7	2.7	7.3	1.0	.1	14.1
Jeff Turner	SF	75	42	1,591	246	92	24	16	530	21.2	3.3	1.2	.3	.2	7.1
Greg Kite	C	72	44	1,479	402	44	30	57	228	20.5	5.6	.6	.4	.8	3.2
Mark Acres	C	68	6	926	252	22	25	15	208	13.6	3.7	.3	.4	.2	3.1
Nick Anderson	SG	60	59	2,203	384	163	97	33	1,196	36.7	6.4	2.7	1.6	.6	19.9
Stanley Roberts	C	55	34	1,118	336	39	22	83	573	20.3	6.1	.7	.4	1.5	10.4
Otis Smith	SG	55	5	877	116	57	36	13	310	15.9	2.1	1.0	.7	.2	5.6
Anthony Bowie	SG	52	26	1,721	245	163	55	38	758	33.1	4.7	3.1	1.1	.7	14.6
Chris Corchiani	PG	51	1	741	78	141	45	2	255	14.5	1.5	2.8	.9	.0	5.0
Bison Dele	PF	48	2	905	272	33	41	53	437	18.9	5.7	.7	.9	1.1	9.1
Jerry Reynolds	SG	46	16	1,159	149	151	63	17	555	25.2	3.2	3.3	1.4	.4	12.1
Sam Vincent	PG	39	18	885	101	148	35	4	411	22.7	2.6	3.8	.9	.1	10.5
Sean Higgins^{†}	PF	32	12	580	94	37	14	6	276	18.1	2.9	1.2	.4	.2	8.6
Dennis Scott	SF	18	15	608	66	35	20	9	359	33.8	3.7	1.9	1.1	.5	19.9
Morlon Wiley^{†}	PG	9	0	90	7	13	4	0	21	10.0	.8	1.4	.4	.0	2.3
Stephen Thompson^{†}	SG	1	0	15	1	1	0	0	2	15.0	1.0	1.0	.0	.0	2.0

- ^{†} Denotes player spent time with another team in the season. Stats reflect time with the Magic only.

== Awards and records ==
- Stanley Roberts – All-Rookie 2nd Team

== Transactions ==
Date	Type	Transaction
9/26/1991	Signing	Signed Donald Royal as a free agent.
10/28/1991	Waiver	Waived Donald Royal.
12/4/1991	Waiver	Waived Morlon Wiley.
12/31/1991	Signing	Signed Anthony Bowie as a free agent.
1/2/1992	Signing	Signed Stephen Thompson as a free agent.
1/7/2010	Waiver	Waived Stephen Thompson.
1/10/1992	Signing	Signed Sean Higgins to 10-day contract.
1/30/1992	Signing	Signed Sean Higgins to 10-day contract.
4/18/1992	Signing	Signed Howard Wright as a free agent.

Player Transactions Citation:
