= Frank Hamblen =

American basketball coach and scout

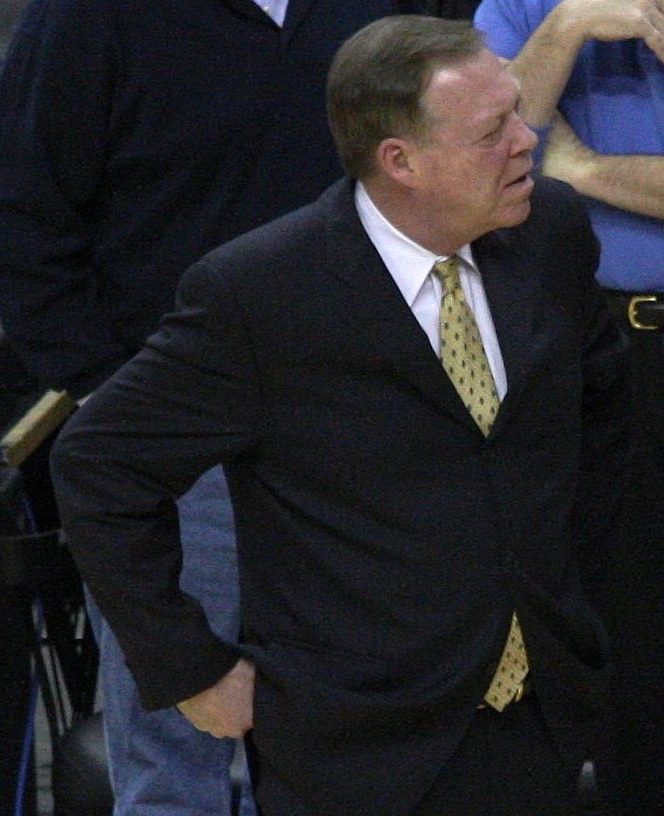
- Hamblen in 2008

Personal information
- Born: April 16, 1947 Terre Haute, Indiana, U.S.
- Died: September 30, 2017 (aged 70) San Diego, California, U.S.
- Listed height: 6 ft 3 in (1.91 m)

Career information
- High school: Garfield (Terre Haute, Indiana)
- College: Syracuse (1966–1969)
- NBA draft: 1969: undrafted
- Position: Guard
- Coaching career: 1969–2011

Career history

Coaching
- 1969–1972: San Diego / Houston Rockets (assistant)
- 1972–1977: Denver Rockets / Nuggets (assistant)
- 1977–1987: Kansas City / Sacramento Kings (assistant)
- 1987–1996: Milwaukee Bucks (assistant)
- 1991–1992: Milwaukee Bucks (interim)
- 1996–1999: Chicago Bulls (assistant)
- 1999–2011: Los Angeles Lakers (assistant)
- 2005: Los Angeles Lakers (interim)

Career highlights
- 7× NBA champion (1997, 1998, 2000–2002, 2009, 2010); Indiana Basketball Hall of Fame (2007)

Frank Alan Hamblen II (April 16, 1947 – September 30, 2017) was an American basketball coach and scout. He played college basketball at Syracuse. He served as an NBA coach for various teams from 1969 to 2011, including stints as the interim head coach of the Milwaukee Bucks (1991–1992) and the Los Angeles Lakers (2005).

== Early life ==
Born in Terre Haute, Indiana in 1947, Hamblen graduated from Garfield High School in Terre Haute in 1965. As a Sophomore, he was a reserve guard on the 1963 IHSAA State Finals team that was defeated by South Bend Central, 72–45 in the first game of the semi-final round. He finished as the Purple Eagles' #3 scorer behind 3-time All-American Terry Dischinger and Hall of Famer Clyde Lovellette. Hamblen was recognized among the top 12 high school basketball players in Indiana and 25 years later was named to the Silver Anniversary Team in 1990 by the Indiana Sports Hall of Fame.

== College career ==
Hamblen graduated from Syracuse University in 1969. On the Syracuse Orange men's basketball team, Hamblen earned three letters and was team captain as a senior. Hamblen averaged 4.6 points per game as a senior.

== Coaching career ==
Hamblen served as an interim head coach for two different teams – the Milwaukee Bucks in 1991–1992 and the Los Angeles Lakers in 2005. He also has served as an assistant coach on six NBA teams (Kansas City/Sacramento Kings, Milwaukee Bucks, Chicago Bulls, Los Angeles Lakers), often alongside Phil Jackson. Hamblen has been an assistant coach on seven championship teams, two with Jackson's Bulls and five with Jackson's Lakers. Jackson retired after the 2010–11 season, and Hamblen's contract with the Lakers expired as well.

== Head coaching record ==
Legend
Regular season	G	Games coached	W	Games won	L	Games lost	W–L %	Win–loss %
Playoffs	PG	Playoff games	PW	Playoff wins	PL	Playoff losses	PW–L %	Playoff win–loss %

Team	Year	G	W	L	W–L%	Finish	PG	PW	PL	PW–L%	Result
Milwaukee	1991–92	65	23	42	.354	6th in Central	—	—	—	—	Missed playoffs
L.A. Lakers	2004–05	39	10	29	.256	4th in Pacific	—	—	—	—	Missed playoffs
Career		104	33	71	.317		—	—	—	—	
