= 1991–92 Indiana Pacers season =

NBA professional basketball team season

- Head coach: Bob Hill
- General manager: Donnie Walsh
- Owner: Herbert Simon
- Arena: Market Square Arena

Results
- Record: 40–42 (.488)
- Place: Division: 4th (Central); Conference: 7th (Eastern)
- Playoff finish: First round (lost to Celtics 0–3)
- Stats at Basketball Reference

Local media
- Television: WTTV; Prime Sports Midwest (Jerry Baker, Clark Kellogg, Kristi Lee)
- Radio: WNDE (Mark Boyle, Bobby "Slick" Leonard)

The 1991–92 Indiana Pacers season was the 16th season for the Indiana Pacers in the National Basketball Association, and their 25th season as a franchise.

== Season summary ==
=== Off-season ===
The Pacers had the 13th overall pick in the 1991 NBA draft, and selected power forward Dale Davis out of Clemson University.

=== Regular season ===
With the addition of Davis, the Pacers struggled losing 9 of their first 13 games of the regular season. After ten games, the team released Mike Sanders to free agency; Sanders would later on re-sign with his former team, the Cleveland Cavaliers in March. The Pacers continued to struggle with a 15–28 record as of January 25, 1992, and later on held a 19–29 record at the All-Star break. However, the team played above .500 in winning percentage for the remainder of the season, winning 25 of their final 39 games. The Pacers finished in fourth place in the Central Division with a mediocre 40–42 record, and earned the seventh seed in the Eastern Conference.

Reggie Miller averaged 20.7 points, 3.8 assists and 1.3 steals per game, and contributed 129 three-point field goals, while Chuck Person averaged 18.5 points, 5.3 rebounds and 4.7 assists per game, and led the Pacers with 132 three-point field goals, and sixth man Detlef Schrempf provided the team with 17.3 points, 9.6 rebounds and 3.9 assists per game off the bench, and was named the NBA Sixth Man of the Year for the second consecutive year. In addition, Michael Williams contributed 15.0 points, 8.2 assists and 2.9 steals per game, and was named to the NBA All-Defensive Second Team, while Rik Smits provided with 13.8 points, 5.6 rebounds and 1.4 blocks per game. Off the bench, Vern Fleming averaged 8.9 points and 3.2 assists per game, while George McCloud contributed 6.6 points per game, but only played 51 games due to a thumb injury, Davis averaged 6.2 points, 6.4 rebounds and 1.2 blocks per game, and LaSalle Thompson provided with 4.9 points and 4.8 rebounds per game.

Schrempf finished tied in 16th place in Most Valuable Player voting, while Williams finished tied in eleventh place in Most Improved Player voting. The Pacers finished 24th in the NBA in home-game attendance, with an attendance of 517,352 at the Market Square Arena during the regular season, which was the fourth-lowest in the league.

=== NBA playoffs ===
In the Eastern Conference First Round of the 1992 NBA playoffs, and for the second consecutive year, the Pacers faced off against the 2nd–seeded, and Atlantic Division champion Boston Celtics, who were led by All-Star guard Reggie Lewis, All-Star center Robert Parish, and All-Star forward and sixth man Kevin McHale. The Celtics were without All-Star forward Larry Bird, who was out due to a back injury. The Pacers lost the first two games to the Celtics on the road at the Boston Garden, before losing Game 3 at home, 102–98 at the Market Square Arena, thus losing the series in a three-game sweep.

=== Aftermath ===
Following the season, Person and Williams were both traded to the Minnesota Timberwolves, after Person spent six seasons with the Pacers.

== Draft picks ==
Round	Pick	Player	Position	Nationality	College
1	13	Dale Davis	PF	United States	Clemson
2	41	Sean Green	SG	United States	Iona

== Roster ==
1991–92 Indiana Pacers roster
Players

Pos.	No.	Player	Height	Weight	DOB	From
PF	32	Dale Davis	6 ft 11 in (2.11 m)	230 lb (104 kg)	1969–03–25	Clemson
C	54	Greg Dreiling	7 ft 1 in (2.16 m)	250 lb (113 kg)	1962–11–07	Kansas
PG	10	Vern Fleming	6 ft 5 in (1.96 m)	185 lb (84 kg)	1962–02–04	Georgia
SG	23	Sean Green	6 ft 5 in (1.96 m)	210 lb (95 kg)	1970–02–02	Iona
SF	43	Jerome Lane	6 ft 6 in (1.98 m)	230 lb (104 kg)	1966–12–04	Pittsburgh
SG	20	George McCloud	6 ft 6 in (1.98 m)	205 lb (93 kg)	1967–05–27	Florida State
SG	31	Reggie Miller	6 ft 7 in (2.01 m)	185 lb (84 kg)	1965–08–24	UCLA
PF	45	Chuck Person	6 ft 8 in (2.03 m)	220 lb (100 kg)	1964–06–27	Auburn
SF	11	Detlef Schrempf	6 ft 9 in (2.06 m)	214 lb (97 kg)	1963–01–21	Washington
C	24	Rik Smits	7 ft 4 in (2.24 m)	250 lb (113 kg)	1966–08–23	Marist
C	41	LaSalle Thompson	6 ft 10 in (2.08 m)	245 lb (111 kg)	1961–06–23	Texas
PF	44	Kenny Williams	6 ft 9 in (2.06 m)	205 lb (93 kg)	1969–06–09	Elizabeth City State
PG	4	Micheal Williams	6 ft 2 in (1.88 m)	175 lb (79 kg)	1966–07–23	Baylor
SG	14	Randy Wittman	6 ft 6 in (1.98 m)	210 lb (95 kg)	1959–10–28	Indiana

Coaches
Head coach
- Bob Hill
Assistant(s)
- Mel Daniels
- George Irvine
- Billy Knight
- Bob Ociepka

Legend
- (DP) Unsigned draft pick
- (FA) Free agent
- (S) Suspended
- Injured

== Regular season ==
=== Season standings ===
Central Division	W	L	PCT	GB	Home	Road	Div
y-Chicago Bulls	67	15	.817	—	36–5	31–10	22–6
x-Cleveland Cavaliers	57	25	.695	10	35–6	22–19	21–7
x-Detroit Pistons	48	34	.585	19	25–16	23–18	15–13
x-Indiana Pacers	40	42	.488	27	26–15	14–27	13–15
Atlanta Hawks	38	44	.463	29	23–18	15–26	7–21
Milwaukee Bucks	31	51	.378	36	25–16	6–35	10–18
Charlotte Hornets	31	51	.378	36	22–19	9–32	10–18

y - clinched division title
x - clinched playoff spot

#	Eastern Conference				
#	Team	W	L	PCT	GB
1	z-Chicago Bulls	67	15	.817	–
2	y-Boston Celtics	51	31	.622	16
3	x-Cleveland Cavaliers	57	25	.695	10
4	x-New York Knicks	51	31	.622	16
5	x-Detroit Pistons	48	34	.585	19
6	x-New Jersey Nets	40	42	.488	27
7	x-Indiana Pacers	40	42	.488	27
8	x-Miami Heat	38	44	.463	29
9	Atlanta Hawks	38	44	.463	29
10	Philadelphia 76ers	35	47	.427	32
11	Milwaukee Bucks	31	51	.378	36
12	Charlotte Hornets	31	51	.378	36
13	Washington Bullets	25	57	.305	42
14	Orlando Magic	21	61	.256	46

z - clinched division title
y - clinched division title
x - clinched playoff spot

== Game log ==
=== Regular season ===
1991–92 game log
Total: 40–42 (home: 26–15; road: 14–27)
November: 6–10 (home: 5–2; road: 1–8)

Game	Date	Team	Score	High points	High rebounds	High assists	Location Attendance	Record
1	November 1, 1991	Washington	L 103–109				Market Square Arena	0–1
2	November 2, 1991	Utah	W 127–112				Market Square Arena	1–1
3	November 5, 1991	@ Phoenix	W 111–105				Arizona Veterans Memorial Coliseum	2–1
4	November 6, 1991	@ Sacramento	L 102–112				ARCO Arena	2–2
5	November 8, 1991	@ Portland	L 96–121				Memorial Coliseum	2–3
6	November 9, 1991	@ Seattle	L 111–118				Seattle Center Coliseum	2–4
7	November 11, 1991	@ L.A. Clippers	L 97–106				Los Angeles Memorial Sports Arena	2–5
8	November 13, 1991	New York	W 110–107				Market Square Arena	3–5
9	November 15, 1991	Seattle	L 108–124				Market Square Arena	3–6
10	November 16, 1991	@ Cleveland	L 117–127				Richfield Coliseum	3–7
11	November 18, 1991	Detroit	W 118–101				Market Square Arena	4–7
12	November 20, 1991	@ Boston	L 101–116				Boston Garden	4–8
13	November 22, 1991	@ Charlotte	L 110–112				Charlotte Coliseum	4–9
14	November 23, 1991	Miami	W 119–83				Market Square Arena	5–9
15	November 27, 1991	@ Dallas	L 106–113				Reunion Arena	5–10
16	November 29, 1991	Houston	W 141–121				Market Square Arena	6–10
17	November 30, 1991	@ Milwaukee	K 119–137				Bradley Center	6–11

December: 6–7 (home: 5–4; road: 1–3)

Game	Date	Team	Score	High points	High rebounds	High assists	Location Attendance	Record
18	December 3, 1991	@ Detroit	W 108–99				The Palace of Auburn Hills	7–11
19	December 4, 1991	Phoenix	L 108–114				Market Square Arena	7–12
20	December 6, 1991	Milwaukee	W 126–106				Market Square Arena	8–12
21	December 7, 1991	Portland	L 112–115				Market Square Arena	8–13
22	December 10, 1991	San Antonio	W 109–102				Market Square Arena	9–13
23	December 13, 1991	Dallas	W 124–108				Market Square Arena	10–13
24	December 14, 1991	Denver	W 129–108				Market Square Arena	11–13
25	December 17, 1991	@ Atlanta	L 113–117				The Omni	11–14
26	December 18, 1991	@ Miami	L 112–118 (OT)				Miami Arena	11–15
27	December 21, 1991	New Jersey	W 118–109 (OT)				Market Square Arena	12–15
28	December 26, 1991	Philadelphia	L 110–113				Market Square Arena	12–16
29	December 28, 1991	@ New York	L 106–115 (OT)				Madison Square Garden	12–17
30	December 30, 1991	Chicago	L 104–109				Market Square Arena	12–18

January: 5–9 (home: 3–4; road: 2–5)

Game	Date	Team	Score	High points	High rebounds	High assists	Location Attendance	Record
31	January 3, 1992	@ L.A. Lakers	W 114–87				Great Western Forum	13–18
32	January 4, 1992	@ Golden State	L 121–140				Oakland-Alameda County Coliseum Arena	13–19
33	January 6, 1992	@ Utah	L 108–124				Delta Center	13–20
34	January 8, 1992	L.A. Clippers	L 102–104				Market Square Arena	13–21
35	January 11, 1992	Atlanta	W 138–115				Market Square Arena	14–21
36	January 14, 1992	@ Washington	L 118–127 (2OT)				Capital Centre	14–22
37	January 15, 1992	Detroit	L 104–118				Market Square Arena	14–23
38	January 17, 1992	Orlando	L 120–127				Market Square Arena	14–24
39	January 18, 1992	Miami	W 127–103				Market Square Arena	15–24
40	January 20, 1992	@ New York	L 97–105				Madison Square Garden	15–25
41	January 22, 1992	@ Cleveland	L 115–119 (OT)				Richfield Coliseum	15–26
42	January 24, 1992	Cleveland	L 102–104				Market Square Arena	15–27
43	January 25, 1992	@ Charlotte	L 105–107				Charlotte Coliseum	15–28
44	January 29, 1992	@ Philadelphia	W 115–90				The Spectrum	16–28
45	January 31, 1992	Atlanta	W 115–106 (OT)				Market Square Arena	17–28

February: 9–5 (home: 5–1; road: 4–4)

Game	Date	Team	Score	High points	High rebounds	High assists	Location Attendance	Record
46	February 2, 1992	@ Denver	W 128–122				Market Square Arena	18–28
47	February 3, 1992	@ Houston	L 111–122				The Summit	18–29
48	February 6, 1992	@ San Antonio	W 117–106				HemisFair Arena	19–29
All-Star Break
49	February 11, 1992	@ Orlando	W 100–98				Orlando Arena	20–29
50	February 12, 1992	New York	L 104–111				Market Square Arena	20–30
51	February 14, 1992	Milwaukee	W 107–100				Market Square Arena	21–30
52	February 15, 1992	@ Minnesota	W 117–101				Target Center	22–30
53	February 17, 1992	Charlotte	W 128–117				Market Square Arena	23–30
54	February 19, 1992	Sacramento	W 129–115				Market Square Arena	24–30
55	February 21, 1992	@ New Jersey	L 101–105				Brendan Byrne Arena	24–31
56	February 23, 1992	Boston	W 102–95				Market Square Arena	25–31
57	February 26, 1992	@ Boston	L 109–130				Boston Garden	25–32
58	February 28, 1992	Orlando	W 114–109				Market Square Arena	26–32
59	February 29, 1992	@ Charlotte	L 119–121				Charlotte Coliseum	26–33

March: 9–5 (home: 5–1; road: 4–4)

Game	Date	Team	Score	High points	High rebounds	High assists	Location Attendance	Record
60	March 3, 1992	@ Chicago	W 103–101				Chicago Stadium	27–33
61	March 4, 1992	@ Detroit	L 107–110 (OT)				The Palace of Auburn Hills	27–34
62	March 6, 1992	@ Atlanta	W 115–113 (OT)				The Omni	28–34
63	March 7, 1992	Minnesota	W 108–97				Market Square Arena	29–34
64	March 10, 1992	Washington	W 101–91				Market Square Arena	30–34
65	March 11, 1992	@ Philadelphia	L 93–111				The Spectrum	30–35
66	March 13, 1992	@ Orlando	L 97–98				Orlando Arena	30–36
67	March 16, 1992	L.A. Lakers	W 98–85				Market Square Arena	31–36
68	March 18, 1992	@ Miami	W 116–111 (OT)				Miami Arena	32–36
69	March 20, 1992	Milwaukee	W 102–97 (OT)				Market Square Arena	33–36
70	March 22, 1992	Philadelphia	W 108–100				Market Square Arena	34–36
71	March 24, 1992	@ Cleveland	L 113–128				Richfield Coliseum	34–37
72	March 25, 1992	@ Washington	W 131–109				Capital Centre	35–37
73	March 27, 1992	Golden State	L 117–125				Market Square Arena	35–38

April: 5–4 (home: 3–3; road: 2–1)

Game	Date	Team	Score	High points	High rebounds	High assists	Location Attendance	Record
74	April 1, 1992	Atlanta	W 137–117				Market Square Arena	36–38
75	April 3, 1992	Boston	W 101–97				Market Square Arena	37–38
76	April 5, 1992	New Jersey	L 120–128				Market Square Arena	37–39
77	April 8, 1992	@ Milwaukee	W 122–107				Bradley Center	38–39
78	April 10, 1992	Chicago	L 96–108				Market Square Arena	38–40
79	April 11, 1992	@ Chicago	L 106–108				Chicago Stadium	38–41
80	April 14, 1992	Charlotte	W 123–96				Market Square Arena	39–41
81	April 16, 1992	@ New Jersey	W 119–113				Brendan Byrne Arena	40–41
82	April 17, 1992	Cleveland	L 102–107				Market Square Arena	40–42

1991–92 schedule

== Playoffs ==
1992 playoff game log
Eastern Conference First Round: 0–3 (home: 0–1; road: 0–2)

Game	Date	Team	Score	High points	High rebounds	High assists	Location Attendance	Series
1	April 23, 1992	@ Boston	L 113–124	Reggie Miller (29)	Detlef Schrempf (11)	Micheal Williams (6)	Boston Garden; 14,890	0–1
2	April 25, 1992	@ Boston	L 112–119 (OT)	Chuck Person (32)	LaSalle Thompson (9)	Micheal Williams (7)	Boston Garden; 14,890	0–2
3	April 27, 1992	Boston	L 98–102	Reggie Miller (32)	Dale Davis (13)	Micheal Williams (11)	Market Square Arena; 16,530	0–3

1992 schedule

== Player statistics ==
=== Ragular season ===
Player	POS	GP	GS	MP	REB	AST	STL	BLK	PTS	MPG	RPG	APG	SPG	BPG	PPG
Reggie Miller	SG	82	82	3,120	318	314	105	26	1,695	38.0	3.9	3.8	1.3	.3	20.7
Vern Fleming	PG	82	6	1,737	209	266	56	7	726	21.2	2.5	3.2	.7	.1	8.9
Chuck Person	SF	81	81	2,923	426	382	68	18	1,497	36.1	5.3	4.7	.8	.2	18.5
LaSalle Thompson	C	80	49	1,299	381	102	52	34	394	16.2	4.8	1.3	.7	.4	4.9
Detlef Schrempf	PF	80	4	2,605	770	312	62	37	1,380	32.6	9.6	3.9	.8	.5	17.3
Micheal Williams	PG	79	76	2,750	282	647	233	22	1,188	34.8	3.6	8.2	2.9	.3	15.0
Rik Smits	C	74	55	1,772	417	116	29	100	1,024	23.9	5.6	1.6	.4	1.4	13.8
Dale Davis	PF	64	23	1,301	410	30	27	74	395	20.3	6.4	.5	.4	1.2	6.2
Greg Dreiling	C	60	23	509	96	25	10	16	117	8.5	1.6	.4	.2	.3	2.0
Kenny Williams	SF	60	6	565	129	40	20	41	252	9.4	2.2	.7	.3	.7	4.2
George McCloud	SF	51	5	892	132	116	26	11	338	17.5	2.6	2.3	.5	.2	6.6
Sean Green	SG	35	0	256	42	22	13	6	141	7.3	1.2	.6	.4	.2	4.0
Randy Wittman	SG	24	0	115	9	11	2	0	17	4.8	.4	.5	.1	.0	.7
Mike Sanders^{†}	SF	10	0	81	8	11	2	1	27	8.1	.8	1.1	.2	.1	2.7
Jerome Lane^{†}	PF	3	0	30	18	4	0	0	6	10.0	6.0	1.3	.0	.0	2.0

- ^{†} Denotes player spent time with another team in the season. Stats reflect time with the Pacers only.

=== Playoffs ===
Player	POS	GP	GS	MP	REB	AST	STL	BLK	PTS	MPG	RPG	APG	SPG	BPG	PPG
Reggie Miller	SG	3	3	130	7	14	4	0	81	43.3	2.3	4.7	1.3	.0	27.0
Chuck Person	SF	3	3	118	9	7	2	0	51	39.3	3.0	2.3	.7	.0	17.0
Micheal Williams	PG	3	3	106	8	24	9	0	50	35.3	2.7	8.0	3.0	.0	16.7
LaSalle Thompson	C	3	3	63	13	4	1	4	16	21.0	4.3	1.3	.3	1.3	5.3
Rik Smits	C	3	1	28	6	0	2	1	10	9.3	2.0	.0	.7	.3	3.3
Detlef Schrempf	PF	3	0	120	39	7	2	1	63	40.0	13.0	2.3	.7	.3	21.0
Dale Davis	PF	3	0	69	19	2	0	5	8	23.0	6.3	.7	.0	1.7	2.7
Vern Fleming	PG	3	0	51	2	6	3	0	21	17.0	.7	2.0	1.0	.0	7.0
George McCloud	SF	2	2	53	2	6	2	1	23	26.5	1.0	3.0	1.0	.5	11.5
Greg Dreiling	C	1	0	3	0	0	0	0	0	3.0	.0	.0	.0	.0	.0
Sean Green	SG	1	0	3	0	0	0	0	0	3.0	.0	.0	.0	.0	.0
Kenny Williams	SF	1	0	1	0	0	1	0	0	1.0	.0	.0	1.0	.0	.0

== Awards and records ==
- Detlef Schrempf, NBA Sixth Man of the Year Award
- Micheal Williams, NBA All-Defensive Second Team

== See also ==
- 1991-92 NBA season
