= 1991–92 Milwaukee Bucks season =

NBA professional basketball team season

- Head coach: Del Harris (resigned); Frank Hamblen (interim)
- General manager: Del Harris
- Owner: Herb Kohl
- Arena: Bradley Center

Results
- Record: 31–51 (.378)
- Place: Division: 6th (Central); Conference: 11th (Eastern)
- Playoff finish: Did not qualify
- Stats at Basketball Reference

Local media
- Television: WCGV-TV; Prime Sports Upper Midwest (Jim Paschke, Jon McGlocklin)
- Radio: WTMJ

The 1991–92 Milwaukee Bucks season was the 24th season for the Milwaukee Bucks in the National Basketball Association.

== Season summary ==
=== Off-season ===
During the off-season, the Bucks signed free agent and former All-Star forward Moses Malone.

=== Regular season ===
With the addition of Malone, the Bucks got off to an 8–9 start to the regular season, as head coach Del Harris resigned and was replaced with assistant coach Frank Hamblen as an interim coach. Under Hamblen, the Bucks played around .500 in winning percentage for the first half of the season, holding a 22–24 record at the All-Star break. However, the team struggled posting an 11-game losing streak between March and April, and lost 14 of their final 15 games of the season. The Bucks finished tied in last place in the Central Division with a disappointing 31–51 record, and failed to qualify for the NBA playoffs for the first time since the 1978–79 season, ending a 12-year playoff streak.

Malone averaged 15.6 points and 9.1 rebounds per game, while off the bench, sixth man Dale Ellis led the Bucks with 15.7 points per game and 138 three-point field goals, and Jay Humphries provided the team with 14.0 points, 6.6 assists and 1.7 steals per game. In addition, Alvin Robertson averaged 12.3 points, 4.4 assists and 2.6 steals per game, while Frank Brickowski provided with 11.4 points and 5.3 rebounds per game, and Fred Roberts contributed 9.6 points per game. Off the bench, Larry Krystkowiak averaged 9.0 points and 5.4 rebounds per game, while Jeff Grayer contributed 9.0 points per game, Brad Lohaus provided with 5.8 points and 3.6 rebounds per game, Danny Schayes averaged 5.6 points and 3.9 rebounds per game, and Lester Conner contributed 3.5 points, 3.6 assists and 1.2 steals per game.

The Bucks finished eleventh in the NBA in home-game attendance, with an attendance of 635,515 at the Bradley Center during the regular season.

=== Aftermath ===
Following the season, Ellis was traded to the San Antonio Spurs in a three-team trade, while Humphries and Krystkowiak were both traded to the Utah Jazz on draft day. Meanwhile, Grayer signed as a free agent with the Golden State Warriors, Conner was released to free agency, and Hamblen was fired as head coach.

== Draft picks ==
Round	Pick	Player	Position	Nationality	College
1	18	Kevin Brooks	SF	United States	Southwestern Louisiana
2	45	Bobby Phills	SG	United States	Southern

== Roster ==
1991–92 Milwaukee Bucks roster
Players

Pos.	No.	Player	Height	Weight	DOB	From
PF	40	Frank Brickowski	6 ft 9 in (2.06 m)	240 lb (109 kg)	1959–08–14	Penn State
PG	15	Lester Conner	6 ft 4 in (1.93 m)	180 lb (82 kg)	1959–09–17	Oregon State
SF	3	Dale Ellis	6 ft 7 in (2.01 m)	205 lb (93 kg)	1960–08–06	Tennessee
SG	20	Jeff Grayer	6 ft 5 in (1.96 m)	200 lb (91 kg)	1965–12–17	Iowa State
PG	12	Steve Henson	5 ft 11 in (1.80 m)	177 lb (80 kg)	1968–02–02	Kansas State
PG	24	Jay Humphries	6 ft 3 in (1.91 m)	185 lb (84 kg)	1962–10–17	Colorado
SF	42	Larry Krystkowiak	6 ft 9 in (2.06 m)	220 lb (100 kg)	1964–09–23	Montana
PF	54	Brad Lohaus	6 ft 11 in (2.11 m)	230 lb (104 kg)	1964–09–29	Iowa
C	8	Moses Malone	6 ft 10 in (2.08 m)	260 lb (118 kg)	1955–03–23	Petersburg HS (VA)
PF	50	Dave Popson	6 ft 10 in (2.08 m)	220 lb (100 kg)	1964–05–17	North Carolina
PF	44	Fred Roberts	6 ft 10 in (2.08 m)	218 lb (99 kg)	1960–08–14	BYU
SG	21	Alvin Robertson	6 ft 3 in (1.91 m)	185 lb (84 kg)	1962–07–22	Arkansas
C	10	Danny Schayes	6 ft 11 in (2.11 m)	235 lb (107 kg)	1959–05–10	Syracuse

Coaches
Head coach
- Frank Hamblen
Assistant(s)
- Mack Calvin
- Larry Riley

Legend
- (DP) Unsigned draft pick
- (FA) Free agent
- (S) Suspended
- Injured

== Regular season ==
=== Season standings ===
Central Division	W	L	PCT	GB	Home	Road	Div
y-Chicago Bulls	67	15	.817	—	36–5	31–10	22–6
x-Cleveland Cavaliers	57	25	.695	10	35–6	22–19	21–7
x-Detroit Pistons	48	34	.585	19	25–16	23–18	15–13
x-Indiana Pacers	40	42	.488	27	26–15	14–27	13–15
Atlanta Hawks	38	44	.463	29	23–18	15–26	7–21
Milwaukee Bucks	31	51	.378	36	25–16	6–35	10–18
Charlotte Hornets	31	51	.378	36	22–19	9–32	10–18

#	Eastern Conference				
#	Team	W	L	PCT	GB
1	z-Chicago Bulls	67	15	.817	–
2	y-Boston Celtics	51	31	.622	16
3	x-Cleveland Cavaliers	57	25	.695	10
4	x-New York Knicks	51	31	.622	16
5	x-Detroit Pistons	48	34	.585	19
6	x-New Jersey Nets	40	42	.488	27
7	x-Indiana Pacers	40	42	.488	27
8	x-Miami Heat	38	44	.463	29
9	Atlanta Hawks	38	44	.463	29
10	Philadelphia 76ers	35	47	.427	32
11	Milwaukee Bucks	31	51	.378	36
12	Charlotte Hornets	31	51	.378	36
13	Washington Bullets	25	57	.305	42
14	Orlando Magic	21	61	.256	46

z - clinched division title
y - clinched division title
x - clinched playoff spot

=== Game log ===
1991–92 game log
Total: 31–51 (Home: 25—16; Road: 6–35)
November: 7–9 (home: 5–2; road: 2–7)

Game	Date	Team	Score	High points	High rebounds	High assists	Location Attendance	Record
1	November 1, 1991	@ Detroit	W 109—99	Dale Ellis (24)			The Palace of Auburn Hills; 21,454	1–0
2	November 2, 1991	Chicago	W 109–107	Alvin Robertson (29)	Alvin Robertson (8)	Jay Humphries (9)	Bradley Center; 18,633	2–0
3	November 5, 1991	@ New York	L 85–113	Dale Ellis, Jay Humphries (14)			Madison Square Garden; 15,768	2–1
4	November 6, 1991	Golden State	L 114–120	Jeff Grayer (27)			Bradley Center; 14,591	2–2
5	November 8, 1991	@ Charlotte	W 125—122 OT	Moses Malone (23)	Brad Lohaus, Moses Malone (8)		Charlotte Coliseum; 23,698	3–2
6	November 9, 1991	Dallas	W 111–95	Jay Humphries (24)	Moses Malone (11)		Bradley Center; 15,175	4–2
7	November 11, 1991	@ Philadelphia	L 99–102				The Spectrum; 12,132	4–3
8	November 12, 1991	@ Cleveland	L 113–119				Richfield Coliseum; 14,267	4–4
9	November 15, 1991	@ Chicago	L 101–114				Chicago Stadium; 18,686	4–5
10	November 16, 1991	Miami	L 116–120 OT				Bradley Center; 15,621	4–6
11	November 19, 1991	Charlotte	W 127–104				Bradley Center; 14,183	5–6
12	November 21, 1991	Washington	W 112–87				Bradley Center; 14,671	6–6
13	November 23, 1991	@ Golden State	L 115–120				Oakland–Alameda County Coliseum Arena; 15,025	6–7
14	November 24, 1991	@ L. A. Lakers	L 97–102				Great Western Forum; 16,820	6–8
15	November 26, 1991	@ Portland	L 98–107 OT				Memorial Coliseum; 12,888	6–9
16	November 30, 1991	Indiana	W 137–119				Bradley Center; 14,623	7–9

December: 7–5 (home: 5–2; road: 2–3)

Game	Date	Team	Score	High points	High rebounds	High assists	Location Attendance	Record
17	December 3, 1991	L. A. Lakers	W 126–94				Bradley Center; 17,739	8–9
18	December 5, 1991	New Jersey	L 101–109				Bradley Center; 13,884	8–10
19	December 6, 1991	@ Indiana	L 106–126				Market Square Arena; 10,132	8–11
20	December 8, 1991	San Antonio	W 102–83				Bradley Center; 14,581	9–11
21	December 10, 1991	@ Atlanta	L 104—118				The Omni; 10,093	9–12
22	December 12, 1991	@ Washington	W 104—97				Capital Centre; 7,213	10–12
23	December 14, 1991	Minnesota	W 103–92				Bradley Center; 14,911	11–12
24	December 18, 1991	@ Boston	L 117—131				Boston Garden; 14,890	11–13
25	December 19, 1991	@ Orlando	W 95—87				Orlando Arena; 15,151	12–13
26	December 21, 1991	Philadelphia	W 110–97				Bradley Center; 15,191	13–13
27	December 26, 1991	Cleveland	L 94–111				Bradley Center; 16,184	13–14
28	December 29, 1991	Houston	W 110–100				Bradley Center; 15,191	14–14

January: 5–6 (home: 4–1; road: 1–5)

Game	Date	Team	Score	High points	High rebounds	High assists	Location Attendance	Record
29	January 2, 1992	@ Minnesota	W 92—91				Target Center; 19,006	15–14
30	January 3, 1992	Chicago	W 113–109				Bradley Center; 18,633	16–14
31	January 8, 1992	Utah	W 99–98				Bradley Center; 15,406	17–14
32	January 10, 1992	@ New Jersey	L 97—104				Brendan Byrne Arena; 9,230	17–15
33	January 11, 1992	Sacramento	L 105–106				Bradley Center; 17,319	17–16
34	January 14, 1992	@ Atlanta	L 88—93				The Omni; 9,390	17–17
35	January 15, 1992	@ Miami	L 115—134				Miami Arena; 15,008	17–18
36	January 17, 1992	New York	W 90–85				Bradley Center; 15,364	18–18
37	January 19, 1992	Orlando	W 108–98				Bradley Center; 14,276	19–18
38	January 21, 1992	@ Houston	L 107—117				The Summit; 12,989	19–19
39	January 22, 1992	@ Dallas	L 116—118				Reunion Arena; 14,299	19–20

February: 0–0 (home: 0–0; road: 0–0)

Game	Date	Team	Score	High points	High rebounds	High assists	Location Attendance	Record

March: 0–0 (home: 0–0; road: 0–0)

Game	Date	Team	Score	High points	High rebounds	High assists	Location Attendance	Record

April: 0–0 (home: 0–0; road: 0–0)

Game	Date	Team	Score	High points	High rebounds	High assists	Location Attendance	Record

1991–92 schedule

== Player statistics ==
Legend
GP	Games played	GS	Games started	MPG	Minutes per game
FG%	Field-goal percentage	3P%	3-point field-goal percentage	FT%	Free-throw percentage
RPG	Rebounds per game	APG	Assists per game	SPG	Steals per game
BPG	Blocks per game	PPG	Points per game

Player	GP	GS	MPG	FG%	3FG%	FT%	RPG	APG	SPG	BPG	PPG
Dale Ellis	81	11	27.0	46.9	41.9	77.4	3.1	1.3	0.7	0.2	15.7
Moses Malone	82	77	30.6	47.4	37.5	78.6	9.1	1.1	0.9	0.8	15.6
Jay Humphries	71	71	31.8	46.9	29.2	78.3	2.6	6.6	1.7	0.2	14.0
Alvin Robertson	82	79	30.0	43.0	31.9	76.3	4.3	4.4	2.6	0.4	12.3
Frank Brickowski	65	60	23.9	52.4	50.0	76.7	5.3	1.9	0.9	0.4	11.4
Fred Roberts	80	63	21.8	48.2	51.4	74.9	3.2	1.5	0.7	0.5	9.6
Larry Krystkowiak	79	16	23.4	44.4	0.0	75.7	5.4	1.4	0.7	0.2	9.0
Jeff Grayer	82	11	20.2	44.8	28.8	66.7	3.1	1.8	0.8	0.2	9.0
Brad Lohaus	70	8	15.4	45.0	39.6	65.9	3.6	1.1	0.6	1.0	5.8
Danny Schayes	43	4	16.9	41.7	0.0	77.1	3.9	0.8	0.4	0.4	5.6
Lester Conner	81	9	17.5	43.1	0.0	70.4	2.3	3.6	1.2	0.1	3.5
Steve Henson	50	1	7.7	36.1	47.9	79.3	0.8	1.6	0.3	0.0	3.0
Jerome Lane	2	0	3.0	100.0	0.0	50.0	2.0	0.0	0.0	0.0	1.5
Dave Popson	5	0	5.2	42.9	0.0	50.0	1.0	0.6	0.4	0.2	1.4

Player statistics citation:

== Transactions ==
=== Trades ===
July 1, 1991	To Milwaukee Bucks Anthony Avent	To Atlanta Hawks Blair Rasmussen; 1993 2nd round draft pick To Denver Nuggets Kevin Brooks; 1994 2nd round draft pick

=== Free agents ===
Player	Signed	Former team
Moses Malone	July 10, 1991	Atlanta Hawks
Billy Thompson	October 5, 1991	Miami Heat
Dave Popson	March 4, 1992	Atlanta Hawks

== See also ==
- 1991-92 NBA season
