= 1991–92 New York Knicks season =

Season of National Basketball Association team the New York Knicks

- Head coach: Pat Riley
- General manager: Ernie Grunfeld
- Owners: Paramount Communications, Inc.
- Arena: Madison Square Garden

Results
- Record: 51–31 (.622)
- Place: Division: 2nd (Atlantic); Conference: 4th (Eastern)
- Playoff finish: Conference semifinals (lost to Bulls 3–4)
- Stats at Basketball Reference

Local media
- Television: MSG Network (Marv Albert, John Andariese, Al Trautwig, Bruce Beck)
- Radio: WFAN (Jim Karvellas, Walt "Clyde" Frazier, Mike Breen)

The 1991–92 New York Knicks season was the 46th season for the New York Knicks in the National Basketball Association.

== Season summary ==
=== Off-season ===
During the off-season, the Knicks hired Pat Riley as their new head coach; Riley previously coached the Los Angeles Lakers two years ago. The team also acquired former All-Star forward Xavier McDaniel from the Phoenix Suns, and signed free agent Anthony Mason. In addition, the Knicks selected point guard Greg Anthony from the University of Nevada, Las Vegas with the twelfth overall pick in the 1991 NBA draft.

=== Regular season ===
Under Riley and with the addition of McDaniel, Mason and Anthony, the Knicks struggled with a 4–5 start to the regular season, but then posted a six-game winning streak between November and December afterwards, and later on held a 30–16 record at the All-Star break. At mid-season, the team traded Brian Quinnett to the Dallas Mavericks in exchange for former All-Star center James Donaldson. The Knicks posted a seven-game winning streak in March, and finished in second place in the Atlantic Division with a 51–31 record, earning the fourth seed in the Eastern Conference; the team qualified for the NBA playoffs for the fifth consecutive year.

Patrick Ewing averaged 24.0 points, 11.2 rebounds and 3.0 blocks per game, and was named to the All-NBA Second Team, and to the NBA All-Defensive Second Team. In addition, John Starks played an increased role as the team's sixth man, averaging 13.9 points and 1.3 steals per game off the bench, while McDaniel provided the Knicks with 13.7 points and 5.6 rebounds per game, Gerald Wilkins contributed 12.4 points per game, and Mark Jackson provided with 11.3 points, 8.6 assists and 1.4 steals per game. Meanwhile, Mason also played a sixth man role off the bench, averaging 7.0 points and rebounds per game each, Charles Oakley averaged 6.2 points and 8.5 rebounds per game, Kiki Vandeweghe contributed 7.0 points per game, and Anthony provided the Knicks with 5.5 points and 3.8 assists per game.

During the NBA All-Star weekend at the Orlando Arena in Orlando, Florida, Ewing was selected for the 1992 NBA All-Star Game, as a member of the Eastern Conference All-Star team, while Starks participated in the NBA Slam Dunk Contest. Ewing also finished in fifth place in Most Valuable Player voting, while Starks finished tied in fourth place in Sixth Man of the Year voting, and also finished tied in sixth place in Most Improved Player voting, and Riley finished in second place in Coach of the Year voting, behind Don Nelson of the Golden State Warriors.

The Knicks finished sixth in the NBA in home-game attendance, with an attendance of 726,608 at Madison Square Garden during the regular season.

=== NBA playoffs ===
In the Eastern Conference First Round of the 1992 NBA playoffs, the Knicks faced off against the 5th–seeded Detroit Pistons, who were led by the All-Star trio of Isiah Thomas, Joe Dumars, and rebound-specialist Dennis Rodman. The Knicks took a 2–1 series lead before losing Game 4 to the Pistons on the road, 86–82 at The Palace of Auburn Hills. With the series tied at 2–2, the Knicks won Game 5 over the Pistons at home, 94–87 at Madison Square Garden to win in a hard-fought five-game series.

In the Eastern Conference Semi-finals, and for the second consecutive year, the team faced off against the top–seeded, and defending NBA champion Chicago Bulls, who won the Central Division title, and were led by the trio of All-Star guard, and Most Valuable Player of the Year, Michael Jordan, All-Star forward Scottie Pippen, and Horace Grant. The Knicks frustrated the Bulls with their physical play, winning Game 1 on the road, 94–89 at the Chicago Stadium, but then lost the next two games. With the Bulls holding a 3–2 series lead, the Knicks managed to win Game 6 at Madison Square Garden, 100–86 to tie the series at 3–3. However, the Knicks lost Game 7 to the Bulls at the Chicago Stadium, 110–81, thus losing in a hard-fought seven-game series, as the Bulls–Knicks rivalry was born.

The Bulls would go on to defeat the Portland Trail Blazers in six games in the 1992 NBA Finals, winning their second consecutive NBA championship.

=== Aftermath ===
Following the season, McDaniel signed as a free agent with the Boston Celtics after only one season with the Knicks, while Jackson was traded to the Los Angeles Clippers in a three-team trade, Vandeweghe signed as a free agent with the Clippers, Wilkins signed with the Cleveland Cavaliers, and Donaldson was released to free agency.

== Draft picks ==
Round	Pick	Player	Position	Nationality	School/Club team
1	12	Greg Anthony	PG	United States	UNLV

== Roster ==
1991–92 New York Knicks roster
Players

Pos.	No.	Player	Height	Weight	DOB	From
PG	2	Greg Anthony	6 ft 0 in (1.83 m)	176 lb (80 kg)	1967–11–15	UNLV
C	35	James Donaldson	7 ft 2 in (2.18 m)	275 lb (125 kg)	1957–08–16	Washington State
C	33	Patrick Ewing	7 ft 0 in (2.13 m)	240 lb (109 kg)	1962–08–05	Georgetown
PG	13	Mark Jackson	6 ft 1 in (1.85 m)	180 lb (82 kg)	1965–04–01	St. John's
SF	14	Anthony Mason	6 ft 7 in (2.01 m)	250 lb (113 kg)	1966–12–14	Tennessee State
C	40	Tim McCormick	6 ft 11 in (2.11 m)	240 lb (109 kg)	1962–03–10	Michigan
SF	32	Xavier McDaniel	6 ft 7 in (2.01 m)	205 lb (93 kg)	1963–06–04	Wichita State
PF	34	Charles Oakley	6 ft 8 in (2.03 m)	225 lb (102 kg)	1963–12–18	Virginia Union
SG	3	John Starks	6 ft 3 in (1.91 m)	180 lb (82 kg)	1965–08–10	Oklahoma State
PF	55	Kiki Vandeweghe	6 ft 8 in (2.03 m)	220 lb (100 kg)	1958–08–01	UCLA
SG	21	Gerald Wilkins	6 ft 6 in (1.98 m)	185 lb (84 kg)	1963–09–11	Chattanooga
SF	20	Kennard Winchester	6 ft 5 in (1.96 m)	210 lb (95 kg)	1966–09–03	Averett

Coaches
Head coach
- Pat Riley
Assistant(s)
- Dick Harter
- Paul Silas
- Jeff Van Gundy
- Bob Salmi

Legend
- (DP) Unsigned draft pick
- (FA) Free agent
- (S) Suspended
- Injured

Roster
Updated: February 20, 1992

== Regular season ==
=== Season standings ===
Atlantic Division	W	L	PCT	GB	Home	Road	Div
y-Boston Celtics	51	31	.622	—	34–7	17–24	19–9
x-New York Knicks	51	31	.622	—	30–11	21–20	20–8
x-New Jersey Nets	40	42	.488	11	25–16	15–26	15–13
x-Miami Heat	38	44	.463	13	28–13	10–31	14–14
Philadelphia 76ers	35	47	.427	16	23–18	12–29	15–13
Washington Bullets	25	57	.305	26	14–27	11–30	7–21
Orlando Magic	21	61	.256	30	13–28	8–33	8–20

y – clinched division title
x – clinched playoff spot

#	Eastern Conference				
#	Team	W	L	PCT	GB
1	z-Chicago Bulls	67	15	.817	–
2	y-Boston Celtics	51	31	.622	16
3	x-Cleveland Cavaliers	57	25	.695	10
4	x-New York Knicks	51	31	.622	16
5	x-Detroit Pistons	48	34	.585	19
6	x-New Jersey Nets	40	42	.488	27
7	x-Indiana Pacers	40	42	.488	27
8	x-Miami Heat	38	44	.463	29
9	Atlanta Hawks	38	44	.463	29
10	Philadelphia 76ers	35	47	.427	32
11	Milwaukee Bucks	31	51	.378	36
12	Charlotte Hornets	31	51	.378	36
13	Washington Bullets	25	57	.305	42
14	Orlando Magic	21	61	.256	46

z – clinched division title
y – clinched division title
x – clinched playoff spot

== Playoffs ==
1992 playoff game log
First Round: 3–2 (home: 2–1; road: 1–1)

Game	Date	Team	Score	High points	High rebounds	High assists	Location Attendance	Series
1	April 24	Detroit	W 109–75	Patrick Ewing (24)	Patrick Ewing (12)	Mark Jackson (6)	Madison Square Garden; 19,081	1–0
2	April 26	Detroit	L 88–89	Xavier McDaniel (24)	Charles Oakley (18)	Mark Jackson (10)	Madison Square Garden; 18,793	1–1
3	April 28	@ Detroit	W 90–87 (OT)	Patrick Ewing (32)	Ewing, McDaniel (13)	Mark Jackson (7)	The Palace of Auburn Hills; 21,454	2–1
4	May 1	@ Detroit	L 82–86	Ewing, McDaniel (18)	Charles Oakley (16)	Greg Anthony (6)	The Palace of Auburn Hills; 21,454	2–2
5	May 3	Detroit	W 94–87	Patrick Ewing (31)	Patrick Ewing (19)	Mark Jackson (5)	Madison Square Garden; 19,135	3–2

Conference semifinals: 3–4 (home: 2–1; road: 1–3)

Game	Date	Team	Score	High points	High rebounds	High assists	Location Attendance	Series
1	May 5	@ Chicago	W 94–89	Patrick Ewing (34)	Patrick Ewing (16)	Patrick Ewing (5)	Chicago Stadium; 18,676	1–0
2	May 7	@ Chicago	L 78–86	Patrick Ewing (16)	Patrick Ewing (16)	Wilkins, Anthony (4)	Chicago Stadium; 18,676	1–1
3	May 9	Chicago	L 86–94	Patrick Ewing (27)	Patrick Ewing (11)	Mark Jackson (8)	Madison Square Garden; 19,763	1–2
4	May 10	Chicago	W 93–86	Xavier McDaniel (24)	Charles Oakley (12)	John Starks (5)	Madison Square Garden; 19,763	2–2
5	May 12	@ Chicago	L 88–96	Xavier McDaniel (26)	Ewing, Oakley (7)	Mark Jackson (12)	Chicago Stadium; 18,676	2–3
6	May 14	Chicago	W 100–86	Patrick Ewing (27)	Xavier McDaniel (11)	Mark Jackson (15)	Madison Square Garden; 19,763	3–3
7	May 17	@ Chicago	L 81–100	Patrick Ewing (22)	Charles Oakley (10)	Mark Jackson (11)	Chicago Stadium; 18,676	3–4

1992 schedule

== Player statistics ==
Legend
GP	Games played	GS	Games started	MPG	Minutes per game
FG%	Field-goal percentage	3P%	3-point field-goal percentage	FT%	Free-throw percentage
RPG	Rebounds per game	APG	Assists per game	SPG	Steals per game
BPG	Blocks per game	PPG	Points per game

=== Regular season ===
Player	GP	GS	MPG	FG%	3P%	FT%	RPG	APG	SPG	BPG	PPG
Greg Anthony	82	1	18.4	.370	.145	.741	1.7	3.8	.7	.1	5.5
James Donaldson^{†}	14	0	5.8	.278		1.000	1.4	.1	.0	.4	.9
Patrick Eddie	4	0	3.3	.222			.3	.0	.0	.0	1.0
Patrick Ewing	82	82	38.4	.522	.167	.738	11.2	1.9	1.1	3.0	24.0
Mark Jackson	81	81	30.4	.491	.256	.770	3.8	8.6	1.4	.2	11.3
Anthony Mason	82	0	26.8	.509		.642	7.0	1.3	.6	.2	7.0
Tim McCormick	22	0	4.9	.424		.667	1.5	.4	.1	.0	1.9
Xavier McDaniel	82	82	28.6	.478	.308	.714	5.6	1.8	.7	.3	13.7
Carlton McKinney	2	0	4.5	.222			.5	.0	.0	.0	2.0
Charles Oakley	82	82	28.2	.522	.000	.735	8.5	1.6	.8	.2	6.2
Brian Quinnett^{†}	24	0	7.9	.384	.385	.571	1.0	.3	.3	.3	3.1
John Starks	82	0	25.8	.449	.348	.778	2.3	3.4	1.3	.2	13.9
Kiki VanDeWeghe	67	0	14.3	.491	.394	.802	1.3	.9	.2	.1	7.0
Gerald Wilkins	82	82	28.6	.447	.352	.730	2.5	2.7	.9	.2	12.4
Kennard Winchester^{†}	15	0	4.3	.444	.500	.800	1.0	.5	.1	.1	2.2

=== Playoffs ===
Player	GP	GS	MPG	FG%	3P%	FT%	RPG	APG	SPG	BPG	PPG
Greg Anthony	12	0	17.8	.413	.417	.606	1.4	3.4	1.3	.1	5.3
James Donaldson	2	0	5.5	1.000			2.0	.0	.0	.5	2.0
Patrick Ewing	12	12	40.2	.456	.000	.740	11.1	2.3	.6	2.6	22.7
Mark Jackson	12	12	30.7	.402	.190	.815	2.3	7.2	.8	.0	8.3
Anthony Mason	12	0	24.0	.442		.786	6.3	.8	.2	.7	5.0
Tim McCormick	1	0	6.0	.000			3.0	.0	.0	.0	.0
Xavier McDaniel	12	12	38.2	.477	.250	.735	7.2	1.9	.8	.2	18.8
Charles Oakley	12	12	29.5	.379		.741	9.0	.7	.7	.4	5.3
John Starks	12	0	24.6	.374	.239	.808	2.5	3.2	1.4	.0	12.1
Kiki VanDeWeghe	8	0	9.4	.542	.800	.857	.8	.5	.3	.1	4.5
Gerald Wilkins	12	12	28.7	.413	.077	.696	2.5	2.8	.4	.1	8.9
Kennard Winchester	3	0	3.7	.600		.000	.0	.7	.0	.0	2.0

- ^{†} Denotes player spent time with another team in the season. Stats reflect time with the Knicks only.

Player statistics citation:

== Awards and records ==
- Patrick Ewing, All-NBA Second Team Selection
- Patrick Ewing, NBA All-Defensive Second Team Selection

== See also ==
- 1991–92 NBA season
