= 1991–92 Atlanta Hawks season =

NBA professional basketball team season

- Head coach: Bob Weiss
- Owners: Ted Turner
- Arena: The Omni

Results
- Record: 38–44 (.463)
- Place: Division: 5th (Central); Conference: 9th (Eastern)
- Playoff finish: Did not qualify
- Stats at Basketball Reference

Local media
- Television: TBS; WGNX; SportSouth
- Radio: WGST

The 1991–92 Atlanta Hawks season was the 43rd season for the Atlanta Hawks in the National Basketball Association, and their 24th season in Atlanta, Georgia.

== Season summary ==
=== Off-season ===
The Hawks received the ninth overall pick in the 1991 NBA draft from the Los Angeles Clippers via trade, and selected small forward Stacey Augmon from the University of Nevada, Las Vegas. During the off-season, the team acquired former All-Star guard Maurice Cheeks from the New York Knicks, acquired second-year guard Travis Mays from the Sacramento Kings, and acquired Blair Rasmussen from the Denver Nuggets. However, Mays would only play in just two games due to two ruptured tendons in his right ankle.

=== Regular season ===
With the addition of Augmon, Rasmussen and Cheeks, the Hawks got off to a 10–8 start to the regular season, posted a six-game winning streak between December and January, and later on held a 24–23 record at the All-Star break. However, with a 22–20 record as of January 28, 1992, Dominique Wilkins suffered an Achilles tendon injury, and was out for the remainder of the season after 42 games. Without Wilkins, the Hawks struggled and fell below .500 in winning percentage, losing 24 of their final 40 games of the season, including a seven-game losing streak in March. The Hawks finished in fifth place in the Central Division with a 38–44 record, missing the NBA playoffs, and losing a tie-breaker for the eighth seed in the Eastern Conference to the Miami Heat.

Wilkins averaged 28.1 points, 7.0 rebounds and 3.8 assists per game, while Kevin Willis averaged 18.3 points and 15.5 rebounds per game, and was named to the All-NBA Third Team, and Augmon provided the team with 13.3 points and 1.5 steals per game, and was named to the NBA All-Rookie First Team. In addition, second-year guard Rumeal Robinson showed improvement becoming the team's starting point guard, averaging 13.0 points, 5.5 assists and 1.3 steals per game, while Rasmussen provided with 9.0 points and 4.9 rebounds per game. Off the bench, Duane Ferrell contributed 12.7 points per game, while rookie shooting guard Paul Graham contributed 10.1 points and 1.2 steals per game, second-year forward Alexander Volkov became the team's starting small forward in Wilkins' absence, averaging 8.6 points and 3.2 assists per game, Cheeks contributed 4.6 points, 3.3 assists and 1.5 steals per game, and Jon Koncak provided with 3.1 points and 3.4 rebounds per game.

During the NBA All-Star weekend at the Orlando Arena in Orlando, Florida, Wilkins and Willis were both selected for the 1992 NBA All-Star Game, as members of the Eastern Conference All-Star team, although Wilkins did not participate due to injury; it was Willis's first and only All-Star appearance. Meanwhile, Augmon participated in the NBA Slam Dunk Contest. Willis also finished in third place in Most Improved Player voting.

The Hawks finished 25th in the NBA in home-game attendance, with an attendance of 511,803 at the Omni Coliseum during the regular season, which was the third-lowest in the league.

=== Aftermath ===
Following the season, Robinson was traded to the New Jersey Nets, and Cheeks and Volkov were both released to free agency.

== Draft picks ==
Round	Pick	Player	Position	Nationality	College
1	9	Stacey Augmon	SG/SF	United States	UNLV
1	15	Anthony Avent	PF	United States	Seton Hall
2	30	Rodney Monroe	SG	United States	NC State

== Roster ==
1991–92 Atlanta Hawks roster
Players

Pos.	No.	Player	Height	Weight	DOB	From
SG	2	Stacey Augmon	6 ft 8 in (2.03 m)	205 lb (93 kg)	1968–08–01	UNLV
PG	10	Maurice Cheeks	6 ft 1 in (1.85 m)	180 lb (82 kg)	1956–09–08	West Texas A&M
SF	33	Duane Ferrell	6 ft 7 in (2.01 m)	208 lb (94 kg)	1965–02–28	Georgia Tech
SG	25	Paul Graham	6 ft 6 in (1.98 m)	200 lb (91 kg)	1967–11–28	Ohio
C	32	Jon Koncak	7 ft 0 in (2.13 m)	250 lb (113 kg)	1963–05–17	SMU
SG	1	Travis Mays (injured)	6 ft 2 in (1.88 m)	190 lb (86 kg)	1968–06–19	Texas
PG	12	Rodney Monroe	6 ft 3 in (1.91 m)	185 lb (84 kg)	1968–04–16	NC State
C	41	Blair Rasmussen	7 ft 0 in (2.13 m)	250 lb (113 kg)	1962–11–13	Oregon
PG	22	Rumeal Robinson	6 ft 2 in (1.88 m)	195 lb (88 kg)	1966–11–13	Michigan
SF	34	Jeff Sanders	6 ft 8 in (2.03 m)	225 lb (102 kg)	1966–01–14	Georgia Southern
PF	8	Alexander Volkov	6 ft 10 in (2.08 m)	218 lb (99 kg)	1964–03–28	Ukraine
SG	11	Morlon Wiley	6 ft 4 in (1.93 m)	185 lb (84 kg)	1966–09–24	Long Beach State
SF	21	Dominique Wilkins (injured)	6 ft 7 in (2.01 m)	200 lb (91 kg)	1960–01–12	Georgia
PF	42	Kevin Willis	7 ft 0 in (2.13 m)	220 lb (100 kg)	1962–09–06	Michigan State

Coaches
Head coach
- Bob Weiss
Assistant(s)
- Johnny Davis
- Bob Weinhauer

Legend
- (DP) Unsigned draft pick
- (FA) Free agent
- (S) Suspended
- Injured

== Regular season ==
=== Season standings ===
Central Division	W	L	PCT	GB	Home	Road	Div
y-Chicago Bulls	67	15	.817	—	36–5	31–10	22–6
x-Cleveland Cavaliers	57	25	.695	10	35–6	22–19	21–7
x-Detroit Pistons	48	34	.585	19	25–16	23–18	15–13
x-Indiana Pacers	40	42	.488	27	26–15	14–27	13–15
Atlanta Hawks	38	44	.463	29	23–18	15–26	7–21
Milwaukee Bucks	31	51	.378	36	25–16	6–35	10–18
Charlotte Hornets	31	51	.378	36	22–19	9–32	10–18

y - clinched division title
x - clinched playoff spot

#	Eastern Conference				
#	Team	W	L	PCT	GB
1	z-Chicago Bulls	67	15	.817	–
2	y-Boston Celtics	51	31	.622	16
3	x-Cleveland Cavaliers	57	25	.695	10
4	x-New York Knicks	51	31	.622	16
5	x-Detroit Pistons	48	34	.585	19
6	x-New Jersey Nets	40	42	.488	27
7	x-Indiana Pacers	40	42	.488	27
8	x-Miami Heat	38	44	.463	29
9	Atlanta Hawks	38	44	.463	29
10	Philadelphia 76ers	35	47	.427	32
11	Milwaukee Bucks	31	51	.378	36
12	Charlotte Hornets	31	51	.378	36
13	Washington Bullets	25	57	.305	42
14	Orlando Magic	21	61	.256	46

z - clinched division title
y - clinched division title
x - clinched playoff spot

== Player statistics ==
Legend
GP	Games played	GS	Games started	MPG	Minutes per game
FG%	Field-goal percentage	3P%	3-point field-goal percentage	FT%	Free-throw percentage
RPG	Rebounds per game	APG	Assists per game	SPG	Steals per game
BPG	Blocks per game	PPG	Points per game

=== Season ===
Player	GP	GS	MPG	FG%	3P%	FT%	RPG	APG	SPG	BPG	PPG
Dominique Wilkins	42	42	38.1	46.4	28.9	83.5	7.0	3.8	1.2	0.6	28.1
Kevin Willis	81	80	36.6	48.3	16.2	80.4	15.5	2.1	0.9	0.7	18.3
Stacey Augmon	82	82	30.5	48.9	16.7	66.6	5.1	2.5	1.5	0.3	13.3
Rumeal Robinson	81	64	27.4	45.6	32.7	63.6	2.7	5.5	1.3	0.3	13.0
Duane Ferrell	66	12	24.2	52.4	33.3	76.1	3.2	1.4	0.7	0.3	12.7
Paul Graham	78	9	22.0	44.7	39.0	74.1	3.0	2.2	1.2	0.3	10.1
Blair Rasmussen	81	61	24.3	47.8	21.7	75.0	4.9	1.3	0.4	0.6	9.0
Alexander Volkov	77	27	19.7	44.1	31.8	63.1	3.4	3.2	0.9	0.4	8.6
Travis Mays	2	0	16.0	42.9	50.0	100.0	1.0	0.5	0.0	0.0	8.5
Maurice Cheeks	56	0	19.4	46.2	50.0	60.5	1.7	3.3	1.5	0.0	4.6
Morlon Wiley	41	19	18.7	44.4	36.8	70.0	1.8	4.0	1.0	0.1	4.3
Jeff Sanders	12	0	9.8	44.4	0.0	77.8	2.2	0.8	0.4	0.3	3.9
Rodney Monroe	38	0	8.2	36.8	22.2	82.6	0.9	0.7	0.3	0.1	3.4
Jon Koncak	77	14	19.3	39.1	0.0	65.5	3.4	1.7	0.6	0.9	3.1
Gary Leonard	5	0	2.6	66.7	0.0	100.0	1.0	0.2	0.2	0.0	2.0

Player statistics citation:

== Awards ==
- Kevin Willis, All-NBA Third Team
- Stacey Augmon, NBA All-Rookie Team 1st Team

== See also ==
- 1991–92 NBA season
