= 1991–92 Charlotte Hornets season =

NBA professional basketball team season

- Head coach: Allan Bristow
- General manager: Dave Twardzik
- Owner: George Shinn
- Arena: Charlotte Coliseum

Results
- Record: 31–51 (.378)
- Place: Division: 7th (Central); Conference: 12th (Eastern)
- Playoff finish: Did not qualify
- Stats at Basketball Reference

Local media
- Television: WCCB; SportSouth (Steve Martin, Gerry Vaillancourt)
- Radio: WBT (Matt Pinto, Gil McGregor)

The 1991–92 Charlotte Hornets season was the fourth season for the Charlotte Hornets in the National Basketball Association.

== Season summary ==
=== Off-season ===
The Hornets won the NBA draft lottery, and selected power forward Larry Johnson from the University of Nevada, Las Vegas with the first overall pick in the 1991 NBA draft. During the off-season, the team signed free agent Anthony Frederick and hired Allan Bristow as their new head coach.

=== Regular season ===
Under Bristow and with the addition of Johnson, the Hornets struggled losing eight of their first nine games of the regular season, and later on held a 14–33 record at the All-Star break. At mid-season, the team traded Rex Chapman to the Washington Bullets in exchange for Tom Hammonds; however, Hammonds was out due to a season-ending groin injury he sustained with the Bullets. The Hornets won 9 of their 13 games in February, while posting a five-game winning streak between February and March, but lost seven of their final eight games of the season, finishing tied in last place in the Central Division with a 31–51 record, which was a five-game improvement over the previous season.

Second-year star Kendall Gill averaged 20.5 points, 5.1 rebounds, 4.2 assists and 1.9 steals per game, while Johnson averaged 19.2 points, 11.0 rebounds and 3.6 assists per game, and was named the NBA Rookie of the Year, and was also named to the NBA All-Rookie First Team. In addition, sixth man Dell Curry provided the team with 15.7 points per game off the bench, while Johnny Newman contributed 15.3 points per game, but only played 55 games due to injury, and Kenny Gattison averaged 12.7 points and 7.1 rebounds per game. Meanwhile, J.R. Reid provided with 11.0 points and 6.2 rebounds per game, but only played 51 games also due to injury, Muggsy Bogues contributed 8.9 points, 9.1 assists and 2.1 steals per game, and Frederick averaged 5.9 points per game. Mike Gminski provided with 5.8 points and 3.4 rebounds per game, but only appeared in just 35 games due to injury, and rookie shooting guard, and second-round draft pick Kevin Lynch contributed 4.1 points per game.

During the NBA All-Star weekend at the Orlando Arena in Orlando, Florida, Johnson participated in the NBA Slam Dunk Contest, while Curry participated in the NBA Three-Point Shootout. Gill finished tied in eighth place in Most Improved Player voting. The Hornets led the NBA in home-game attendance for the third time in four seasons, which an attendance of 971,618 at the Charlotte Coliseum during the regular season.

=== Aftermath ===
Following the season, Frederick was released to free agency.

== Draft picks ==
| Round | Pick | Player | Position | Nationality | College |
|---|---|---|---|---|---|
| 1 | 1 | Larry Johnson | PF | United States | UNLV |
| 2 | 28 | Kevin Lynch | SG | United States | Minnesota |

== Roster ==
1991–92 Charlotte Hornets roster
Players

| Pos. | No. | Player | Height | Weight | DOB | From |
|---|---|---|---|---|---|---|
| PF | 54 | Michael Ansley | 6 ft 7 in (2.01 m) | 225 lb (102 kg) | 1967–02–08 | Alabama |
| PG | 1 | Muggsy Bogues | 5 ft 3 in (1.60 m) | 136 lb (62 kg) | 1965–01–09 | Wake Forest |
| SG | 30 | Dell Curry | 6 ft 4 in (1.93 m) | 190 lb (86 kg) | 1964–06–25 | Virginia Tech |
| SF | 24 | Anthony Frederick | 6 ft 7 in (2.01 m) | 205 lb (93 kg) | 1964–12–07 | Pepperdine |
| PF | 33 | Kenny Gattison | 6 ft 8 in (2.03 m) | 225 lb (102 kg) | 1964–05–23 | Old Dominion |
| SF | 13 | Kendall Gill | 6 ft 5 in (1.96 m) | 195 lb (88 kg) | 1968–05–25 | Illinois |
| C | 42 | Mike Gminski | 6 ft 11 in (2.11 m) | 250 lb (113 kg) | 1959–08–03 | Duke |
| PF | 12 | Tom Hammonds (IN) | 6 ft 9 in (2.06 m) | 215 lb (98 kg) | 1967–03–27 | Georgia Tech |
| PF | 2 | Larry Johnson | 6 ft 6 in (1.98 m) | 250 lb (113 kg) | 1969–03–14 | UNLV |
| C | 45 | Eric Leckner | 6 ft 11 in (2.11 m) | 265 lb (120 kg) | 1966–05–27 | Wyoming |
| PG | 9 | Kevin Lynch | 6 ft 5 in (1.96 m) | 195 lb (88 kg) | 1968–12–24 | Minnesota |
| SF | 22 | Johnny Newman | 6 ft 7 in (2.01 m) | 190 lb (86 kg) | 1963–11–28 | Richmond |
| PG | 21 | Elliot Perry | 6 ft 0 in (1.83 m) | 150 lb (68 kg) | 1969–03–28 | Memphis |
| C | 34 | J. R. Reid | 6 ft 9 in (2.06 m) | 247 lb (112 kg) | 1968–03–31 | North Carolina |

Coaches
Head coach
- Allan Bristow
Assistant(s)
- T. R. Dunn
- Bill Hanzlik

Legend
- (DP) Unsigned draft pick
- (FA) Free agent
- (S) Suspended
- (IN) Inactive
- Injured

Roster
Updated: February 20, 1992

=== Roster notes ===
- Power forward Tom Hammonds was acquired by the Hornets from the Washington Bullets in a mid-season trade, but was placed on the injured reserve list due to a groin injury he sustained with the Bullets, and did not play with the Hornets this season.

== Regular season ==
=== Season standings ===
| Central Division | W | L | PCT | GB | Home | Road | Div |
|---|---|---|---|---|---|---|---|
| y-Chicago Bulls | 67 | 15 | .817 | — | 36–5 | 31–10 | 22–6 |
| x-Cleveland Cavaliers | 57 | 25 | .695 | 10 | 35–6 | 22–19 | 21–7 |
| x-Detroit Pistons | 48 | 34 | .585 | 19 | 25–16 | 23–18 | 15–13 |
| x-Indiana Pacers | 40 | 42 | .488 | 27 | 26–15 | 14–27 | 13–15 |
| Atlanta Hawks | 38 | 44 | .463 | 29 | 23–18 | 15–26 | 7–21 |
| Milwaukee Bucks | 31 | 51 | .378 | 36 | 25–16 | 6–35 | 10–18 |
| Charlotte Hornets | 31 | 51 | .378 | 36 | 22–19 | 9–32 | 10–18 |

| # | Eastern Conference | | | | |
| # | Team | W | L | PCT | GB |
|---|---|---|---|---|---|
| 1 | z-Chicago Bulls | 67 | 15 | .817 | – |
| 2 | y-Boston Celtics | 51 | 31 | .622 | 16 |
| 3 | x-Cleveland Cavaliers | 57 | 25 | .695 | 10 |
| 4 | x-New York Knicks | 51 | 31 | .622 | 16 |
| 5 | x-Detroit Pistons | 48 | 34 | .585 | 19 |
| 6 | x-New Jersey Nets | 40 | 42 | .488 | 27 |
| 7 | x-Indiana Pacers | 40 | 42 | .488 | 27 |
| 8 | x-Miami Heat | 38 | 44 | .463 | 29 |
| 9 | Atlanta Hawks | 38 | 44 | .463 | 29 |
| 10 | Philadelphia 76ers | 35 | 47 | .427 | 32 |
| 11 | Milwaukee Bucks | 31 | 51 | .378 | 36 |
| 12 | Charlotte Hornets | 31 | 51 | .378 | 36 |
| 13 | Washington Bullets | 25 | 57 | .305 | 42 |
| 14 | Orlando Magic | 21 | 61 | .256 | 46 |

z – clinched division title
y – clinched division title
x – clinched playoff spot

== Player statistics ==
=== Ragular season ===
| Player | POS | GP | GS | MP | REB | AST | STL | BLK | PTS | MPG | RPG | APG | SPG | BPG | PPG |
|---|---|---|---|---|---|---|---|---|---|---|---|---|---|---|---|
| Larry Johnson | PF | 82 | 77 | 3,047 | 899 | 292 | 81 | 51 | 1,576 | 37.2 | 11.0 | 3.6 | 1.0 | .6 | 19.2 |
| Kenny Gattison | PF | 82 | 71 | 2,223 | 580 | 131 | 59 | 69 | 1,042 | 27.1 | 7.1 | 1.6 | .7 | .8 | 12.7 |
| Muggsy Bogues | PG | 82 | 69 | 2,790 | 235 | 743 | 170 | 6 | 730 | 34.0 | 2.9 | 9.1 | 2.1 | .1 | 8.9 |
| Kendall Gill | SG | 79 | 79 | 2,906 | 402 | 329 | 154 | 46 | 1,622 | 36.8 | 5.1 | 4.2 | 1.9 | .6 | 20.5 |
| Dell Curry | SG | 77 | 0 | 2,020 | 259 | 177 | 93 | 20 | 1,209 | 26.2 | 3.4 | 2.3 | 1.2 | .3 | 15.7 |
| Anthony Frederick | SF | 66 | 26 | 852 | 144 | 71 | 40 | 26 | 389 | 12.9 | 2.2 | 1.1 | .6 | .4 | 5.9 |
| Eric Leckner | C | 59 | 2 | 716 | 206 | 31 | 9 | 18 | 196 | 12.1 | 3.5 | .5 | .2 | .3 | 3.3 |
| Johnny Newman | SF | 55 | 55 | 1,651 | 179 | 146 | 70 | 14 | 839 | 30.0 | 3.3 | 2.7 | 1.3 | .3 | 15.3 |
| Kevin Lynch | SG | 55 | 3 | 819 | 85 | 83 | 37 | 9 | 224 | 14.9 | 1.5 | 1.5 | .7 | .2 | 4.1 |
| J. R. Reid | C | 51 | 7 | 1,257 | 317 | 81 | 49 | 23 | 560 | 24.6 | 6.2 | 1.6 | 1.0 | .5 | 11.0 |
| Elliot Perry^{†} | PG | 40 | 0 | 371 | 32 | 64 | 25 | 2 | 113 | 9.3 | .8 | 1.6 | .6 | .1 | 2.8 |
| Mike Gminski | C | 35 | 10 | 499 | 118 | 31 | 11 | 16 | 202 | 14.3 | 3.4 | .9 | .3 | .5 | 5.8 |
| Rex Chapman^{†} | PG | 21 | 11 | 545 | 54 | 86 | 14 | 8 | 260 | 26.0 | 2.6 | 4.1 | .7 | .4 | 12.4 |
| Greg Grant^{†} | PG | 13 | 0 | 57 | 4 | 18 | 8 | 0 | 1 | 4.4 | .3 | 1.4 | .6 | .0 | .1 |
| Ronnie Grandison | PF | 3 | 0 | 25 | 11 | 1 | 1 | 1 | 10 | 8.3 | 3.7 | .3 | .3 | .3 | 3.3 |
| Tony Massenburg^{†} | PF | 3 | 0 | 13 | 4 | 0 | 1 | 0 | 1 | 4.3 | 1.3 | .0 | .3 | .0 | .3 |
| Michael Ansley^{†} | SF | 2 | 0 | 13 | 2 | 0 | 0 | 0 | 6 | 6.5 | 1.0 | .0 | .0 | .0 | 3.0 |
| Cedric Hunter | PG | 1 | 0 | 1 | 0 | 0 | 0 | 0 | 0 | 1.0 | .0 | .0 | .0 | .0 | .0 |

- ^{†} Denotes player spent time with another team in the season. Stats reflect time with the Hornets only.

== Awards and records ==
- Larry Johnson, NBA Rookie of the Year Award
- Larry Johnson, NBA All-Rookie Team 1st Team

== Transactions ==
- July 15, 1991

Waived Randolph Keys.

- September 4, 1991

Signed Anthony Frederick as a free agent.

- October 10, 1991

Signed Scott Haffner as a free agent.

- October 11, 1991

Waived Scott Haffner.

- October 31, 1991

Claimed Greg Grant on waivers from the Indiana Pacers.

- November 5, 1991

Waived Kevin Lynch.

- December 9, 1991

Signed Elliot Perry as a free agent.

Waived Greg Grant.

- December 11, 1991

Signed Tony Massenburg as a free agent.

- December 30, 1991

Signed Ron Grandison as a free agent.

- January 1, 1992

Signed Ron Grandison to the first of two 10-day contracts.

- January 2, 1992

Released Michael Ansley.

- January 7, 1992

Waived Ron Grandison.

Waived Tony Massenburg.

- January 10, 1992

Signed Michael Ansley to a 10-day contract.

- February 15, 1992

Signed Cedric Hunter to a 10-day contract.

- February 19, 1992

Traded Rex Chapman to the Washington Bullets for Tom Hammonds.

- February 20, 1992

Waived Cedric Hunter.
