= 1991–92 New Jersey Nets season =

Nets' 25th season in the National Basketball Association

- Head coach: Bill Fitch
- Arena: Brendan Byrne Arena

Results
- Record: 40–42 (.488)
- Place: Division: 3rd (Atlantic); Conference: 6th (Eastern)
- Playoff finish: First round (lost to Cavaliers 1–3)
- Stats at Basketball Reference

Local media
- Television: WWOR-TV; SportsChannel New York
- Radio: WNEW

The 1991–92 New Jersey Nets season was the Nets' 25th season in the National Basketball Association, and 16th season in East Rutherford, New Jersey.

== Season summary ==
=== Off-season ===
The Nets received the second overall pick in the 1991 NBA draft, and selected point guard Kenny Anderson out of Georgia Tech University. However, Anderson held out early into the regular season due to a contract dispute, and Roy Hinson would miss the entire season due to a knee injury.

For the season, the Nets redesigned their road uniforms, replacing the light blue-to-white gradient uniforms from the previous season with royal blue uniforms, which featured a red and white trim and red side panels on their jerseys and shorts; these uniforms would remain in use until 1997.

=== Regular season ===
With the addition of Anderson, the Nets struggled losing 11 of their first 13 games of the regular season, and later on held a 7–18 start to the season. The team posted a five-game winning streak in January, and later on held a 19–28 record at the All-Star break. The Nets posted an eight-game losing streak between January and February, but won nine of their final twelve games of the season, finishing in third place in the Atlantic Division with a 40–42 record, and earning the sixth seed in the Eastern Conference; the team qualified for the NBA playoffs for the first time since the 1985–86 season.

Dražen Petrović showed improvement becoming the team's starting shooting guard, averaging 20.6 points and 1.3 steals per game, and also leading the Nets with 123 three-point field goals, while second-year star Derrick Coleman averaged 19.8 points, 9.5 rebounds and 1.5 blocks per game, and Sam Bowie provided the team with 15.0 points, 8.1 rebounds and 1.7 blocks per game. In addition, Mookie Blaylock contributed 13.8 points, 6.8 assists and 2.4 steals per game, while Chris Morris provided with 11.4 points, 6.4 rebounds and 1.7 steals per game. Off the bench, second-year forward Terry Mills averaged 9.0 points and 5.5 rebounds per game, while Anderson played a role as backup point guard for Blaylock, averaging 7.0 points and 3.2 assists per game, second-year guard Tate George contributed 6.0 points per game, Rafael Addison provided with 5.8 points per game, and Chris Dudley averaged 5.6 points, 9.0 rebounds and 2.2 blocks per game.

During the NBA All-Star weekend at the Orlando Arena in Orlando, Florida, Petrović participated in the NBA Three-Point Shootout; he also finished in second place in Most Improved Player voting, behind Pervis Ellison of the Washington Bullets, while Blaylock finished tied in eleventh place, and head coach Bill Fitch finished in sixth place in Coach of the Year voting. The Nets finished 23rd in the NBA in home-game attendance, with an attendance of 517,356 at the Brendan Byrne Arena during the regular season, which was the fifth-lowest in the league.

=== NBA playoffs ===
In the Eastern Conference First Round of the 1992 NBA playoffs, the Nets faced off against the 3rd–seeded Cleveland Cavaliers, who were led by the trio of All-Star center Brad Daugherty, All-Star guard Mark Price, and Larry Nance. The Nets lost the first two games to the Cavaliers on the road at the Coliseum at Richfield, but managed to win Game 3 at home, 109–104 at the Brendan Byrne Arena. However, the Nets lost Game 4 to the Cavaliers at home, 98–89, thus losing the series in four games.

=== Aftermath ===
Following the season, Blaylock and Hinson were both traded to the Atlanta Hawks, while Mills signed as a free agent with the Detroit Pistons, and Fitch resigned as head coach after clashing with his young stars.

== Draft picks ==
Round	Pick	Player	Position	Nationality	College
1	2	Kenny Anderson	PG	United States	Georgia Tech
2	53	Von McDade	SG	United States	Milwaukee

== Roster ==
1991–92 New Jersey Nets roster
Players

Pos.	No.	Player	Height	Weight	DOB	From
SF	21	Rafael Addison	6 ft 7 in (2.01 m)	215 lb (98 kg)	1964-07-22	Syracuse
PG	7	Kenny Anderson	6 ft 0 in (1.83 m)	168 lb (76 kg)	1970-10-09	Georgia Tech
PG	10	Mookie Blaylock	6 ft 0 in (1.83 m)	180 lb (82 kg)	1967-03-20	Oklahoma
C	31	Sam Bowie	7 ft 1 in (2.16 m)	235 lb (107 kg)	1961-03-17	Kentucky
PF	44	Derrick Coleman	6 ft 10 in (2.08 m)	230 lb (104 kg)	1967-06-21	Syracuse
C	22	Chris Dudley	6 ft 11 in (2.11 m)	235 lb (107 kg)	1965-02-22	Yale
C	54	Dave Feitl	6 ft 11 in (2.11 m)	235 lb (107 kg)	1962-06-08	UTEP
SG	12	Tate George	6 ft 5 in (1.96 m)	190 lb (86 kg)	1968-05-29	Connecticut
PF	6	Roy Hinson (injured) (IN)	6 ft 9 in (2.06 m)	210 lb (95 kg)	1961-05-02	Rutgers
SG	20	Doug Lee	6 ft 5 in (1.96 m)	200 lb (91 kg)	1964-10-24	Purdue
PF	5	Terry Mills	6 ft 10 in (2.08 m)	230 lb (104 kg)	1967-12-21	Michigan
SF	34	Chris Morris	6 ft 8 in (2.03 m)	210 lb (95 kg)	1966-01-20	Auburn
SG	3	Dražen Petrović	6 ft 5 in (1.96 m)	195 lb (88 kg)	1964-10-22	Croatia

Coaches
Head coach
- Bill Fitch
Assistant(s)
- Rick Carlisle
- Tom Newell

Legend
- (DP) Unsigned draft pick
- (FA) Free agent
- (S) Suspended
- (IN) Inactive
- Injured

=== Roster notes ===
- Power forward Roy Hinson was on the injured reserve list due to a knee injury, and missed the entire regular season.

== Regular season ==
=== Season standings ===
Atlantic Division	W	L	PCT	GB	Home	Road	Div
y-Boston Celtics	51	31	.622	—	34–7	17–24	19–9
x-New York Knicks	51	31	.622	—	30–11	21–20	20–8
x-New Jersey Nets	40	42	.488	11	25–16	15–26	15–13
x-Miami Heat	38	44	.463	13	28–13	10–31	14–14
Philadelphia 76ers	35	47	.427	16	23–18	12–29	15–13
Washington Bullets	25	57	.305	26	14–27	11–30	7–21
Orlando Magic	21	61	.256	30	13–28	8–33	8–20

y – clinched division title
x – clinched playoff spot

#	Eastern Conference				
#	Team	W	L	PCT	GB
1	z-Chicago Bulls	67	15	.817	–
2	y-Boston Celtics	51	31	.622	16
3	x-Cleveland Cavaliers	57	25	.695	10
4	x-New York Knicks	51	31	.622	16
5	x-Detroit Pistons	48	34	.585	19
6	x-New Jersey Nets	40	42	.488	27
7	x-Indiana Pacers	40	42	.488	27
8	x-Miami Heat	38	44	.463	29
9	Atlanta Hawks	38	44	.463	29
10	Philadelphia 76ers	35	47	.427	32
11	Milwaukee Bucks	31	51	.378	36
12	Charlotte Hornets	31	51	.378	36
13	Washington Bullets	25	57	.305	42
14	Orlando Magic	21	61	.256	46

z – clinched division title
y – clinched division title
x – clinched playoff spot

=== Game log ===
1991–92 game log
Total: 40–42
November

Game	Date	Team	Score	High points	High rebounds	High assists	Location Attendance	Record
1	November 2	@ Charlotte	W 116–108					1–0
2	November 6	@ Philadelphia	L 105–107					1–1
3	November 7	Miami	L 89–111					1–2
4	November 9	Detroit	L 100–110					1–3
5	November 12	@ New York	L 96–98					1–4
6	November 13	Utah	L 92–98					1–5
7	November 15	Washington	L 111–116 (OT)					1–6
8	November 16	@ Orlando	L 100–102					1–7
9	November 19	Sacramento	W 122–118					2–7
10	November 21	@ Cleveland	L 112–116					2–8
11	November 23	Boston	L 107–125					2–9
12	November 26	@ Houston	L 109–118					2–10
13	November 27	@ San Antonio	L 100–106					2–11
14	November 29	@ Dallas	W 97–91					3–11
15	November 30	@ Denver	L 97–107					3–12

December

Game	Date	Team	Score	High points	High rebounds	High assists	Location Attendance	Record
16	December 3	Philadelphia	W 88–86					4–12
17	December 5	@ Milwaukee	W 109–101					5–12
18	December 6	L. A. Lakers	L 89–98					5–13
19	December 10	New York	L 88–114					5–14
20	December 12	Denver	W 121–81					6–14
21	December 14	Charlotte	L 102–109					6–15
22	December 17	@ New York	L 94–102					6–16
23	December 18	Cleveland	W 102–93					7–16
24	December 20	Chicago	L 98–115					7–17
25	December 21	@ Indiana	L 109–118 (OT)					7–18
26	December 23	Atlanta	W 105–93					8–18
27	December 26	Houston	W 99–93					9–18
28	December 27	@ Charlotte	W 136–120					10–18
29	December 30	Orlando	W 122–112					11–18

January

Game	Date	Team	Score	High points	High rebounds	High assists	Location Attendance	Record
30	January 3	Washington	L 108–112					11–19
31	January 4	@ Chicago	L 96–140					11–20
32	January 6	L. A. Clippers	W 105–90					12–20
33	January 8	Minnesota	W 103–97					13–20
34	January 10	Milwaukee	W 104–97					14–20
35	January 11	@ Detroit	L 88–90					14–21
36	January 14	Dallas	W 97–88					15–21
37	January 15	@ Boston	W 130–120					16–21
38	January 18	@ Minnesota	W 112–100					17–21
39	January 22	Phoenix	W 106–104					18–21
40	January 24	Miami	W 123–117					19–21
41	January 25	@ Philadelphia	L 94–115					19–22
42	January 28	@ Sacramento	L 118–124					19–23
43	January 29	@ Phoenix	L 95–128					19–24
44	January 31	@ Portland	L 108–113					19–25

February

Game	Date	Team	Score	High points	High rebounds	High assists	Location Attendance	Record
45	February 1	@ L. A. Clippers	L 88–99					19–26
46	February 5	Seattle	L 85–95					19–27
47	February 6	@ Washington	L 108–124					19–28
48	February 11	@ Chicago	L 113–133					19–29
49	February 12	@ Philadelphia	W 102–87					20–29
50	February 14	Philadelphia	W 107–99					21–29
51	February 15	@ Cleveland	L 92–128					21–30
52	February 19	Detroit	W 106–102					22–30
53	February 21	Indiana	W 105–101					23–30
54	February 22	@ Atlanta	L 107–119					23–31
55	February 25	Boston	W 109–95					24–31
56	February 27	Portland	W 98–96					25–31
57	February 29	@ Detroit	W 99–90					26–31

March

Game	Date	Team	Score	High points	High rebounds	High assists	Location Attendance	Record
58	March 1	New York	W 90–75					27–31
59	March 4	@ L. A. Lakers	L 92–101					27–32
60	March 6	@ Utah	L 96–117					27–33
61	March 7	@ Seattle	L 98–109					27–34
62	March 10	@ Golden State	L 122–129					27–35
63	March 13	@ Boston	W 110–108					28–35
64	March 14	@ New York	W 96–94 (OT)					29–35
65	March 17	Chicago	L 79–90					29–36
66	March 20	Washington	W 99–96					30–36
67	March 22	@ Miami	L 100–107					30–37
68	March 23	Charlotte	W 123–120					31–37
69	March 25	Boston	L 110–118					31–38
70	March 28	Golden State	L 148–153 (OT)					31–39
71	March 30	San Antonio	W 117–109					32–39

April

Game	Date	Team	Score	High points	High rebounds	High assists	Location Attendance	Record
72	April 1	@ Milwaukee	W 121–117					33–39
73	April 3	Milwaukee	W 122–103					34–39
74	April 5	@ Indiana	W 128–120					35–39
75	April 7	Atlanta	L 97–104					35–40
76	April 8	@ Washington	W 109–103					36–40
77	April 10	Cleveland	W 110–86					37–40
78	April 11	@ Atlanta	L 98–118					37–41
79	April 13	@ Orlando	W 110–104					38–41
80	April 14	@ Miami	W 105–100					39–41
81	April 16	Indiana	L 113–119					39–42
82	April 18	Orlando	W 127–111					40–42

== Playoffs ==
1992 playoff game log
First Round: 1–3 (home: 1–1; road: 0–2)

Game	Date	Team	Score	High points	High rebounds	High assists	Location Attendance	Series
1	April 23	@ Cleveland	L 113–120	Dražen Petrović (40)	Derrick Coleman (11)	Derrick Coleman (9)	Richfield Coliseum; 16,512	0–1
2	April 25	@ Cleveland	L 96–118	Derrick Coleman (24)	Derrick Coleman (9)	Mookie Blaylock (6)	Richfield Coliseum; 20,273	0–2
3	April 28	Cleveland	W 109–104	Chris Morris (28)	Derrick Coleman (11)	Mookie Blaylock (12)	Brendan Byrne Arena; 15,258	1–2
4	April 30	Cleveland	L 89–98	Coleman, Morris (22)	Derrick Coleman (14)	Derrick Coleman (6)	Brendan Byrne Arena; 13,071	1–3

1992 schedule

== Player statistics ==
Legend
GP	Games played	GS	Games started	MPG	Minutes per game
FG%	Field-goal percentage	3P%	3-point field-goal percentage	FT%	Free-throw percentage
RPG	Rebounds per game	APG	Assists per game	SPG	Steals per game
BPG	Blocks per game	PPG	Points per game

=== Season ===
Player	GP	GS	MPG	FG%	3P%	FT%	RPG	APG	SPG	BPG	PPG
Dražen Petrović	82	82	36.9	.508	.444	.808	3.1	3.1	1.3	0.1	20.6
Derrick Coleman	65	58	34.0	.504	.303	.763	9.5	3.2	0.8	1.5	19.8
Sam Bowie	71	61	30.7	.445	.320	.757	8.1	2.6	0.6	1.7	15.0
Mookie Blaylock	72	67	35.4	.432	.222	.712	3.7	6.8	2.4	0.6	13.8
Chris Morris	77	74	31.1	.477	.200	.714	6.4	2.6	1.7	1.1	11.4
Terry Mills	82	24	20.9	.463	.348	.750	5.5	1.0	0.6	0.5	9.0
Kenny Anderson	64	13	17.0	.390	.231	.745	2.0	3.2	1.0	0.1	7.0
Tate George	70	2	14.8	.427	.167	.821	1.5	2.3	0.6	0.0	6.0
Rafael Addison	76	8	15.5	.433	.286	.737	2.2	0.9	0.4	0.4	5.8
Chris Dudley	82	21	23.2	.403		.468	9.0	0.7	0.5	2.2	5.6
Jud Buechler	2	0	14.5	.500			1.0	1.0	1.0	0.5	4.0
Doug Lee	46	0	6.7	.431	.270	.526	0.8	0.5	0.2	0.0	2.6
Dave Feitl	34	0	5.1	.429		.842	1.8	0.2	0.1	0.1	2.4

=== Playoffs ===
Player	GP	GS	MPG	FG%	3P%	FT%	RPG	APG	SPG	BPG	PPG
Dražen Petrović	4	4	40.8	.539	.333	.846	2.5	3.3	1.0	0.3	24.3
Derrick Coleman	4	4	40.5	.486	.167	.762	11.3	5.3	1.8	1.0	22.3
Chris Morris	4	4	33.8	.552	.400	.778	5.0	1.3	1.8	1.8	18.8
Mookie Blaylock	4	4	37.0	.309	.167	.750	4.0	7.8	3.8	0.5	9.5
Sam Bowie	4	4	28.0	.424	.500	.667	4.8	2.3	0.8	0.8	9.3
Terry Mills	4	0	19.3	.370	.000	.636	6.0	2.0	0.3	0.5	6.8
Rafael Addison	1	0	9.0	.286	.500		0.0	1.0	0.0	0.0	5.0
Tate George	4	0	11.0	.304		.333	0.0	2.0	0.8	0.3	3.8
Chris Dudley	4	0	19.3	.357		.500	6.3	0.8	0.5	2.5	3.5
Kenny Anderson	3	0	8.0	.333		1.000	1.0	1.0	0.3	0.0	2.7
Dave Feitl	1	0	3.0	.500			1.0	0.0	0.0	0.0	2.0
Doug Lee	2	0	3.0	.000	.000		0.0	0.5	0.0	0.5	0.0

Player statistics citation:
