= 1991–92 Washington Bullets season =

NBA professional basketball team season

- Head coach: Wes Unseld
- Arena: Capital Centre (37 games); Baltimore Arena (4 games)

Results
- Record: 25–57 (.305)
- Place: Division: 6th (Atlantic); Conference: 12th (Eastern)
- Playoff finish: Did not qualify
- Stats at Basketball Reference

Local media
- Television: WDCA; Home Team Sports
- Radio: WTOP

The 1991–92 Washington Bullets season was the 31st season for the Washington Bullets in the National Basketball Association, and their 19th season in Washington, D.C.

== Season summary ==
=== Off-season ===
The Bullets had the 19th overall pick in the 1991 NBA draft, and selected shooting guard LaBradford Smith from the University of Louisville; the Bullets originally had the eighth overall pick in the draft, but traded it to the Denver Nuggets in exchange for former Bullets guard Michael Adams. During the off-season, the team signed free agents David Wingate, Andre Turner, and undrafted rookie small forward Larry Stewart.

However, Bernard King would miss the entire regular season due to a right knee injury; to make matters worse, Hot Plate Williams was suspended for the entire season due to continuing weight problems.

=== Regular season ===
With the addition of Adams, Wingate and Stewart, and the loss of King and Williams, the Bullets got off to a 6–9 start to the regular season, but then posted an eight-game losing streak in December afterwards. The team managed to win six of their next seven games, but then posted another eight-game losing streak in January, and later on held a 16–30 record at the All-Star break. At mid-season, the team traded Tom Hammonds to the Charlotte Hornets in exchange for Rex Chapman; however, Chapman would only play in the final game of the season due to a strained left heel injury he sustained with the Hornets. The Bullets posted a six-game losing streak between February and March, posted a seven-game losing streak in March, and another six-game losing streak in April. The Bullets lost 15 of their final 18 games of the season, and finished in sixth place in the Atlantic Division with a 25–57 record.

Pervis Ellison showed improvement averaging 20.0 points, 11.2 rebounds and 2.7 blocks per game, and was named the NBA Most Improved Player of the Year, while Adams averaged 18.1 points, 7.6 assists and 1.9 steals per game, and led the Bullets with 125 three-point field goals. In addition, Harvey Grant provided the team with 18.0 points and 6.8 rebounds per game, while Ledell Eackles contributed 13.2 points per game, and second-year guard A.J. English provided with 10.9 points per game. Meanwhile, Stewart averaged 10.4 points and 5.9 rebounds per game, and was named to the NBA All-Rookie Second Team, becoming the first undrafted NBA player to be named to an NBA All-Rookie Team. Wingate averaged 7.9 points and 1.5 steals per game, while Smith contributed 5.1 points per game, but only played just 48 games due to injury, Turner provided with 4.4 points and 2.5 assists per game, and defensive center Charles Jones averaged 1.1 points, 4.2 rebounds and 1.2 blocks per game; Jones struggled only shooting .367 in field-goal percentage.

During the NBA All-Star weekend at the Orlando Arena in Orlando, Florida, Adams was selected for the 1992 NBA All-Star Game, as a member of the Eastern Conference All-Star team; it was his first and only All-Star appearance. The Bullets finished 26th in the NBA in home-game attendance, with an attendance of 505,988 at the Capital Centre during the regular season, which was the second-lowest in the league.

=== Aftermath ===
Following the season, Williams signed as a free agent with the Los Angeles Clippers, while Wingate signed with the Charlotte Hornets during the following season, and English and Turner were both released to free agency.

== Draft picks ==
Round	Pick	Player	Position	Nationality	College
1	19	LaBradford Smith	SG	United States	Louisville

== Roster ==
1991–92 Washington Bullets roster
Players

Pos.	No.	Player	Height	Weight	DOB	From
PG	10	Michael Adams	5 ft 10 in (1.78 m)	162 lb (73 kg)	1963–01–19	Boston College
PF	31	Mark Alarie (injured) (IN)	6 ft 8 in (2.03 m)	217 lb (98 kg)	1963–12–11	Duke
SG	3	Rex Chapman	6 ft 4 in (1.93 m)	185 lb (84 kg)	1967–10–05	Kentucky
SF	21	Ledell Eackles	6 ft 5 in (1.96 m)	220 lb (100 kg)	1966–11–24	LSU New Orleans
C	43	Pervis Ellison	6 ft 9 in (2.06 m)	210 lb (95 kg)	1967–04–03	Louisville
SG	14	A. J. English	6 ft 3 in (1.91 m)	175 lb (79 kg)	1967–07–11	Virginia Union
PF	42	Greg Foster	6 ft 11 in (2.11 m)	240 lb (109 kg)	1968–10–03	UTEP
PF	44	Harvey Grant	6 ft 8 in (2.03 m)	195 lb (88 kg)	1965–07–04	Oklahoma
PG	32	Byron Irvin	6 ft 5 in (1.96 m)	190 lb (86 kg)	1966–12–02	Missouri
C	23	Charles Jones	6 ft 9 in (2.06 m)	215 lb (98 kg)	1957–04–03	Albany State
SG	22	LaBradford Smith	6 ft 3 in (1.91 m)	200 lb (91 kg)	1969–04–03	Louisville
PF	33	Larry Stewart	6 ft 8 in (2.03 m)	220 lb (100 kg)	1968–09–21	Coppin State
PF	35	Derek Strong	6 ft 8 in (2.03 m)	220 lb (100 kg)	1968–02–09	Xavier
PG	1	Andre Turner	5 ft 11 in (1.80 m)	160 lb (73 kg)	1964–12–13	Memphis
SG	55	David Wingate	6 ft 5 in (1.96 m)	185 lb (84 kg)	1963–12–15	Georgetown

Coaches
Head coach
- Wes Unseld
Assistant(s)
- Bill Blair
- Jeff Bzdelik

Legend
- (DP) Unsigned draft pick
- (FA) Free agent
- (S) Suspended
- (IN) Inactive
- Injured

Roster
Updated: March 13, 1992

=== Roster Notes ===
- Power forward Mark Alarie was on the injured reserve list due to a knee injury, and missed the entire regular season.
- Small forward Bernard King was on the injured reserve list due to a right knee injury, and missed the entire regular season.
- Power forward John "Hot Plate" Williams was suspended indefinitely due to weight problems, and not maintaining playing shape.

== Regular season ==
=== Season standings ===
Atlantic Division	W	L	PCT	GB	Home	Road	Div
y-Boston Celtics	51	31	.622	—	34–7	17–24	19–9
x-New York Knicks	51	31	.622	—	30–11	21–20	20–8
x-New Jersey Nets	40	42	.488	11	25–16	15–26	15–13
x-Miami Heat	38	44	.463	13	28–13	10–31	14–14
Philadelphia 76ers	35	47	.427	16	23–18	12–29	15–13
Washington Bullets	25	57	.305	26	14–27	11–30	7–21
Orlando Magic	21	61	.256	30	13–28	8–33	8–20

y - clinched division title
x - clinched playoff spot

#	Eastern Conference				
#	Team	W	L	PCT	GB
1	z-Chicago Bulls	67	15	.817	–
2	y-Boston Celtics	51	31	.622	16
3	x-Cleveland Cavaliers	57	25	.695	10
4	x-New York Knicks	51	31	.622	16
5	x-Detroit Pistons	48	34	.585	19
6	x-New Jersey Nets	40	42	.488	27
7	x-Indiana Pacers	40	42	.488	27
8	x-Miami Heat	38	44	.463	29
9	Atlanta Hawks	38	44	.463	29
10	Philadelphia 76ers	35	47	.427	32
11	Milwaukee Bucks	31	51	.378	36
12	Charlotte Hornets	31	51	.378	36
13	Washington Bullets	25	57	.305	42
14	Orlando Magic	21	61	.256	46

z - clinched division title
y - clinched division title
x - clinched playoff spot

== Game log ==
=== Regular season ===
1991–92 game log
Total: 25–57 (home: 14–27; road: 11–30)
November: 6–9 (home: 2–5; road: 4–4)

Game	Date	Team	Score	High points	High rebounds	High assists	Location Attendance	Record

December : 5–9 (home: 2–4; road: 3–5)

Game	Date	Team	Score	High points	High rebounds	High assists	Location Attendance	Record

January : 3–11 (home: 2–7; road: 1–4)

Game	Date	Team	Score	High points	High rebounds	High assists	Location Attendance	Record

February : 4–10 (home: 2–5; road: 2–5)

Game	Date	Team	Score	High points	High rebounds	High assists	Location Attendance	Record
All-Star Break

March : 5–10 (home: 4–4; road: 1–6)

Game	Date	Team	Score	High points	High rebounds	High assists	Location Attendance	Record

April : 2–8 (home: 2–2; road: 0–6)

Game	Date	Team	Score	High points	High rebounds	High assists	Location Attendance	Record

1991–92 schedule

== Player statistics ==
Legend
GP	Games played	GS	Games started	MPG	Minutes per game
FG%	Field-goal percentage	3P%	3-point field-goal percentage	FT%	Free-throw percentage
RPG	Rebounds per game	APG	Assists per game	SPG	Steals per game
BPG	Blocks per game	PPG	Points per game

=== Regular season ===
Washington Bullets statistics
Player	GP	GS	MPG	FG%	3P%	FT%	RPG	APG	SPG	BPG	PPG
Michael Adams	78	78	35.8	.393	.324	.869	4.0	7.6	1.9	.1	18.1
Rex Chapman^{†}	1	0	22.0	.417	.000		4.0	3.0	1.0	.0	10.0
Ledell Eackles	65	25	22.5	.468	.200	.743	2.7	1.9	.7	.1	13.2
Pervis Ellison	66	64	38.0	.539	.333	.728	11.2	2.9	.9	2.7	20.0
A. J. English	81	6	20.6	.433	.176	.841	2.1	1.8	.4	.1	10.9
Greg Foster	49	3	11.2	.461	.000	.714	3.0	.7	.1	.2	4.3
Harvey Grant	64	60	37.3	.478	.125	.800	6.8	2.7	1.2	.4	18.0
Tom Hammonds	37	19	26.6	.488	.000	.610	5.0	1.0	.6	.4	11.9
Charles Jones	75	32	18.2	.367		.500	4.2	.8	.6	1.2	1.1
Albert King	6	0	9.8	.367	.286	.875	1.8	.8	.5	.0	5.2
Ralph Sampson	10	0	10.8	.310	.000	.667	3.0	.4	.3	.8	2.2
LaBradford Smith	48	5	14.8	.407	.095	.804	1.7	2.1	.9	.0	5.1
Larry Stewart	76	43	29.3	.514	.000	.807	5.9	1.6	.7	.6	10.4
Derek Strong	1	0	12.0	.000		.750	5.0	1.0	.0	.0	3.0
Andre Turner	70	3	12.4	.425	.063	.792	1.3	2.5	.8	.0	4.1
David Wingate	81	72	26.3	.465	.056	.719	3.3	3.0	1.5	.3	7.9

- ^{†} Denotes player spent time with another team in the season. Stats reflect time with the Bullets only.

Player statistics citation:

== Awards and records ==
- Pervis Ellison, NBA Most Improved Player Award
- Larry Stewart, NBA All-Rookie Team 2nd Team

== See also ==
- 1991–92 NBA season
