= 1991–92 Detroit Pistons season =

- Head coach: Chuck Daly
- General manager: Jack McCloskey
- Owners: William Davidson
- Arena: The Palace of Auburn Hills

Results
- Record: 48–34 (.585)
- Place: Division: 3rd (Central); Conference: 5th (Eastern)
- Playoff finish: First round (lost to Knicks 2–3)
- Stats at Basketball Reference

Local media
- Television: WKBD-TV; PASS Sports
- Radio: WWJ

The 1991–92 Detroit Pistons season was the 44th season for the Detroit Pistons in the National Basketball Association, and their 35th season in Detroit, Michigan.

== Season summary ==
=== Off-season ===
During the off-season, the Pistons acquired Orlando Woolridge from the Denver Nuggets, and acquired Darrell Walker from the Washington Bullets.

=== Regular season ===
With the addition of Woolridge and Walker, the Pistons struggled with a 10–14 start to the regular season, but then won 12 of their next 14 games, and later on held a 28–20 record at the All-Star break. The team posted a seven-game winning streak in March, and then posted a six-game winning streak in April. The Pistons finished in third place in the Central Division with a 48–34 record, and earned the fifth seed in the Eastern Conference; the team qualified for the NBA playoffs for the ninth consecutive year.

Joe Dumars averaged 19.9 points and 4.6 assists per game, while Isiah Thomas averaged 18.5 points, 7.2 assists and 1.5 steals per game, and Woolridge provided the team with 14.0 points per game. In addition, sixth man Mark Aguirre contributed 11.3 points per game off the bench, while Bill Laimbeer provided with 9.7 points and 5.6 rebounds per game, and Dennis Rodman averaged 9.8 points, and led the league with 18.7 rebounds per game. Meanwhile, off the bench, John Salley provided with 9.5 points, 4.1 rebounds and 1.5 blocks per game, and Walker contributed 5.2 points and 2.8 assists per game.

During the NBA All-Star weekend at the Orlando Arena in Orlando, Florida, Dumars, Thomas and Rodman were all selected for the 1992 NBA All-Star Game, as members of the Eastern Conference All-Star team; it was Rodman's second and final All-Star appearance. Dumars and Rodman were both named to the NBA All-Defensive First Team, while Rodman was named to the All-NBA Third Team. Rodman finished in second place in Defensive Player of the Year voting, behind David Robinson of the San Antonio Spurs, while Dumars finished in fifth place; Rodman also finished in tenth place in Most Valuable Player voting, and head coach Chuck Daly finished tied in ninth place in Coach of the Year voting.

The Pistons finished second in the NBA in home-game attendance behind the Charlotte Hornets, with an attendance of 879,614 at The Palace of Auburn Hills during the regular season. Throughout the regular season, speculation that it was Daly's last season as head coach of the Pistons lingered in the media, intensifying as the season went out and well into the NBA playoffs.

=== NBA playoffs ===
In the Eastern Conference First Round of the 1992 NBA playoffs, the Pistons faced off against the 4th–seeded New York Knicks, who were led by All-Star center Patrick Ewing, Xavier McDaniel, and sixth man John Starks. The Knicks took a 2–1 series lead before the Pistons won Game 4 at home, 86–82 at The Palace of Auburn Hills to even the series. However, the Pistons lost Game 5 to the Knicks on the road, 94–87 at Madison Square Garden, thus losing in a hard-fought five-game series, as the "Bad Boys" era was fading. The Pistons would not return to the NBA playoffs again until the 1995–96 season.

=== Notable incidents ===
One notable incident of the regular season occurred on December 14, 1991, during a road game against the Utah Jazz at the Delta Center. Early in the first quarter, All-Star forward Karl Malone committed a flagrant foul on Thomas, in which Malone hit Thomas's forehead with his elbow; Thomas had to receive 40 stitches, while Malone was suspended for one game. The Pistons lost to the Jazz by a score of 102–100.

Prior to the regular season, the Bulls–Pistons rivalry took another ugly turn, as Thomas was left off the Dream Team for the 1992 Summer Olympics coached by Daly, reportedly at the request of All-Star guard Michael Jordan.

=== Aftermath ===
Following the season, Daly resigned and left to coach the New Jersey Nets, and Salley was traded to the Miami Heat.

== Draft picks ==
Round	Pick	Player	Position	Nationality	College
2	40	Doug Overton	PG	United States	La Salle

== Roster ==
1991–92 Detroit Pistons roster
Players

Pos.	No.	Player	Height	Weight	DOB	From
SF	23	Mark Aguirre	6 ft 6 in (1.98 m)	232 lb (105 kg)	1959–12–10	DePaul
C	50	William Bedford	7 ft 0 in (2.13 m)	225 lb (102 kg)	1963–12–14	Memphis
SG	32	Lance Blanks	6 ft 4 in (1.93 m)	190 lb (86 kg)	1966–09–09	Texas
SG	4	Joe Dumars	6 ft 3 in (1.91 m)	190 lb (86 kg)	1963–05–24	McNeese State
PG	12	Gerald Henderson	6 ft 2 in (1.88 m)	175 lb (79 kg)	1956–01–16	VCU
C	40	Bill Laimbeer	6 ft 11 in (2.11 m)	245 lb (111 kg)	1957–05–19	Notre Dame
PF	30	Bob McCann	6 ft 6 in (1.98 m)	244 lb (111 kg)	1964–04–22	Morehead State
PF	10	Dennis Rodman	6 ft 7 in (2.01 m)	210 lb (95 kg)	1961–05–13	SE Oklahoma State
PF	22	John Salley	6 ft 11 in (2.11 m)	230 lb (104 kg)	1964–05–16	Georgia Tech
C	2	Brad Sellers	7 ft 0 in (2.13 m)	210 lb (95 kg)	1962–12–17	Ohio State
PG	14	Charles Thomas	6 ft 3 in (1.91 m)	175 lb (79 kg)	1969–10–03	Eastern Michigan
PG	11	Isiah Thomas	6 ft 1 in (1.85 m)	180 lb (82 kg)	1961–04–30	Indiana
SG	5	Darrell Walker	6 ft 4 in (1.93 m)	180 lb (82 kg)	1961–03–09	Arkansas
PF	6 /0	Orlando Woolridge	6 ft 9 in (2.06 m)	215 lb (98 kg)	1959–12–16	Notre Dame

Coaches
Head coach
- Chuck Daly
Assistant(s)
- Brendan Malone
- Brendan Suhr

Legend
- (DP) Unsigned draft pick
- (FA) Free agent
- (S) Suspended
- Injured

== Regular season ==
=== Season standings ===
Central Division	W	L	PCT	GB	Home	Road	Div
y-Chicago Bulls	67	15	.817	—	36–5	31–10	22–6
x-Cleveland Cavaliers	57	25	.695	10	35–6	22–19	21–7
x-Detroit Pistons	48	34	.585	19	25–16	23–18	15–13
x-Indiana Pacers	40	42	.488	27	26–15	14–27	13–15
Atlanta Hawks	38	44	.463	29	23–18	15–26	7–21
Milwaukee Bucks	31	51	.378	36	25–16	6–35	10–18
Charlotte Hornets	31	51	.378	36	22–19	9–32	10–18

y - clinched division title
x - clinched playoff spot

#	Eastern Conference				
#	Team	W	L	PCT	GB
1	z-Chicago Bulls	67	15	.817	–
2	y-Boston Celtics	51	31	.622	16
3	x-Cleveland Cavaliers	57	25	.695	10
4	x-New York Knicks	51	31	.622	16
5	x-Detroit Pistons	48	34	.585	19
6	x-New Jersey Nets	40	42	.488	27
7	x-Indiana Pacers	40	42	.488	27
8	x-Miami Heat	38	44	.463	29
9	Atlanta Hawks	38	44	.463	29
10	Philadelphia 76ers	35	47	.427	32
11	Milwaukee Bucks	31	51	.378	36
12	Charlotte Hornets	31	51	.378	36
13	Washington Bullets	25	57	.305	42
14	Orlando Magic	21	61	.256	46

z - clinched conference title
y - clinched division title
x - clinched playoff spot

== Playoffs ==
1992 playoff game log
First Round: 2–3 (home: 1–1; road: 1–2)

Game	Date	Team	Score	High points	High rebounds	High assists	Location Attendance	Series
1	April 24	@ New York	L 75–109	Joe Dumars (13)	John Salley (5)	Joe Dumars (5)	Madison Square Garden; 19,081	1–0
2	April 26	@ New York	W 89–88	Joe Dumars (21)	Bill Laimbeer (12)	Isiah Thomas (6)	Madison Square Garden; 18,793	1–1
3	April 28	New York	L 87–90 (OT)	John Salley (20)	Dennis Rodman (14)	Isiah Thomas (11)	The Palace of Auburn Hills; 21,454	2–1
4	May 1	New York	W 86–82	Joe Dumars (23)	Dennis Rodman (17)	Isiah Thomas (12)	The Palace of Auburn Hills; 21,454	2–2
5	May 3	@ New York	L 87–94	Isiah Thomas (31)	Isiah Thomas (10)	Isiah Thomas (6)	Madison Square Garden; 19,135	3–2

1992 schedule

== Player statistics ==
Legend
GP	Games played	GS	Games started	MPG	Minutes per game
FG%	Field-goal percentage	3P%	3-point field-goal percentage	FT%	Free-throw percentage
RPG	Rebounds per game	APG	Assists per game	SPG	Steals per game
BPG	Blocks per game	PPG	Points per game

=== Season ===
Player	GP	GS	MPG	FG%	3P%	FT%	RPG	APG	SPG	BPG	PPG
Mark Aguirre	75	12	21.1	.431	.211	.687	3.1	1.7	0.68	0.15	11.3
William Bedford	32	8	11.3	.413	.000	.636	2.0	0.4	0.19	0.56	3.6
Lance Blanks	43	0	4.4	.455	.375	.727	0.5	0.4	0.33	0.02	1.5
Joe Dumars	82	82	38.9	.448	.408	.867	2.3	4.6	0.87	0.15	19.9
Gerald Henderson	8	0	7.8	.381	.600	1.000	0.8	0.6	0.38	0.00	3.0
Bill Laimbeer	81	46	27.6	.470	.376	.893	5.6	2.0	0.63	0.67	9.7
Bob McCann	26	0	5.0	.394	.000	.308	1.2	0.2	0.23	0.15	1.2
Dennis Rodman	82	80	40.3	.539	.317	.600	18.7	2.3	0.83	0.85	9.8
John Salley	72	38	24.6	.512	.000	.715	4.1	1.6	0.68	1.53	9.5
Brad Sellers	43	1	5.3	.466	.000	.769	1.0	0.3	0.02	0.23	2.4
Charles Thomas	36	0	4.3	.353	.118	.667	0.6	0.6	0.11	0.03	1.3
Isiah Thomas	78	78	37.4	.446	.291	.772	3.2	7.2	1.51	0.19	18.5
Darrell Walker	74	4	20.8	.423	.000	.619	3.2	2.8	0.85	0.24	5.2
Orlando Woolridge	82	61	25.8	.498	.111	.683	3.2	1.1	0.50	0.40	14.0

=== Playoffs ===
Player	GP	GS	MPG	FG%	3P%	FT%	RPG	APG	SPG	BPG	PPG
Mark Aguirre	5	0	22.6	.333	.200	.750	1.8	2.4	.4	.2	9.0
William Bedford	1	0	9.0	.500			2.0	.0	1.0	.0	6.0
Lance Blanks	1	0	10.0	.500			1.0	3.0	3.0	.0	2.0
Joe Dumars	5	5	44.2	.471	.500	.789	1.6	3.2	1.0	.2	16.8
Bill Laimbeer	5	4	29.0	.370	.200	1.000	6.6	1.6	.8	.2	8.2
Bob McCann	1	0	13.0	.500			2.0	.0	.0	1.0	6.0
Dennis Rodman	5	5	31.2	.593	.000	.500	10.2	1.8	.8	.4	7.2
John Salley	5	1	29.8	.455	.000	.821	6.0	2.8	.6	2.8	12.6
Brad Sellers	2	0	6.5	.500		1.000	.0	1.0	.0	1.0	3.0
Isiah Thomas	5	5	40.0	.338	.364	.786	5.2	7.4	1.0	.0	14.0
Darrell Walker	5	0	13.6	.333		1.000	2.4	.8	.2	.0	2.0
Orlando Woolridge	5	5	25.6	.442		.563	2.0	.6	.2	.2	11.0

Player statistics citation:

== Awards and records ==
- Dennis Rodman, All-NBA Third Team
- Joe Dumars, NBA All-Defensive First Team
- Dennis Rodman, NBA All-Defensive First Team

== See also ==
- 1991–92 NBA season
