= 1991–92 Philadelphia 76ers season =

Season of National Basketball Association team the Philadelphia 76ers

- Head coach: Jim Lynam
- General manager: Gene Shue
- Owner: Harold Katz
- Arena: The Spectrum

Results
- Record: 35–47 (.427)
- Place: Division: 5th (Atlantic); Conference: 10th (Eastern)
- Playoff finish: Did not qualify
- Stats at Basketball Reference

Local media
- Television: WPHL-TV; SportsChannel Philadelphia; PRISM
- Radio: WIP

The 1991–92 Philadelphia 76ers season was the 43rd season for the Philadelphia 76ers in the National Basketball Association, and their 29th season in Philadelphia, Pennsylvania.

== Season summary ==
=== Off-season ===
During the off-season, the 76ers signed free agents Charles Shackleford and Greg Grant. For the season, the 76ers redesigned their home and road uniforms. The team added the city name "Philadelphia" and the team nickname "Sixers", along with red, white and blue stars and a slated blue-to-white background gradient on the front of their jerseys; they also added their primary logo to the right leg of their shorts. The white home uniforms featured a red trim, while the red road uniforms featured a slated blue trim.

The team's new uniforms would remain in use until 1994.

=== Regular season ===
For the season, All-Star forward Charles Barkley changed his jersey number from #34 to #32, in honor of Los Angeles Lakers All-Star guard Magic Johnson, who retired early into the regular season due to his HIV infection; however, the 76ers had retired that number in honor of Billy Cunningham, who then un-retired it for Barkley to wear. Despite the loss of Rick Mahorn, who left to play overseas in Italy, the 76ers won seven of their first ten games of the regular season, but then struggled posting a seven-game losing streak between November and December afterwards, and later on held a 23–24 record at the All-Star break. After holding a 29–31 record as of March 6, 1992, the team continued to struggle losing 16 of their final 22 games of the season. The 76ers finished in fifth place in the Atlantic Division with a disappointing 35–47 record, and failed to qualify for the NBA playoffs.

Barkley averaged 23.1 points, 11.1 rebounds, 4.1 assists and 1.8 steals per game, while Hersey Hawkins averaged 19.0 points and 1.9 steals per game, and Armen Gilliam provided the team with 16.9 points and 8.1 rebounds per game. In addition, sixth man Ron Anderson contributed 13.7 points per game off the bench, while Johnny Dawkins provided with 12.0 points and 6.9 assists per game, Shackleford averaged 6.6 points and 5.8 rebounds per game, Grant contributed 4.1 points and 3.6 assists per game, and Manute Bol provided with 1.5 points, 3.1 rebounds and 2.9 blocks per game.

During the NBA All-Star weekend at the Orlando Arena in Orlando, Florida, Barkley was selected for the 1992 NBA All-Star Game, as a member of the Eastern Conference All-Star team. Johnson briefly returned to score 25 points along with 5 rebounds, 9 assists, 2 steals, and made all 3 of his three-point field goals attempts; Johnson was named the NBA All-Star Game Most Valuable Player, as the Western Conference defeated the Eastern Conference, 153–113. Barkley also finished tied in twelfth place in Most Valuable Player voting.

The 76ers finished 20th in the NBA in home-game attendance, with an attendance of 574,137 at The Spectrum during the regular season.

=== Aftermath ===
Following the season, Barkley was traded to the Phoenix Suns after eight seasons with the 76ers, while Mahorn would later on sign as a free agent with the New Jersey Nets, second-year forward Jayson Williams was traded to the Nets, and head coach Jim Lynam was fired.

== Draft picks ==
Round	Pick	Player	Position	Nationality	School/Club team
2	44	Álvaro Teherán	C	Colombia	Houston

== Roster ==
1991–92 Philadelphia 76ers roster
Players

Pos.	No.	Player	Height	Weight	DOB	From
SF	20	Ron Anderson	6 ft 7 in (2.01 m)	215 lb (98 kg)	1958–10–15	Fresno State
PF	32	Charles Barkley	6 ft 6 in (1.98 m)	252 lb (114 kg)	1963–02–20	Auburn
C	11	Manute Bol	7 ft 7 in (2.31 m)	200 lb (91 kg)	1962–10–16	Bridgeport
PG	12	Johnny Dawkins	6 ft 2 in (1.88 m)	165 lb (75 kg)	1963–09–28	Duke
SF	35	Armen Gilliam	6 ft 9 in (2.06 m)	230 lb (104 kg)	1964–05–28	UNLV
PG	3	Greg Grant	5 ft 7 in (1.70 m)	140 lb (64 kg)	1966–08–29	TCNJ
SG	33	Hersey Hawkins	6 ft 3 in (1.91 m)	190 lb (86 kg)	1966–09–29	Bradley
C	40	Dave Hoppen	6 ft 11 in (2.11 m)	235 lb (107 kg)	1964–03–13	Nebraska
SG	31	Brian Oliver	6 ft 4 in (1.93 m)	210 lb (95 kg)	1968–06–01	Georgia Tech
SF	21	Kenny Payne	6 ft 8 in (2.03 m)	195 lb (88 kg)	1966–11–25	Louisville
C	43	Jeff Ruland	6 ft 10 in (2.08 m)	240 lb (109 kg)	1958–12–16	Iona
C	14	Charles Shackleford	6 ft 10 in (2.08 m)	225 lb (102 kg)	1966–04–22	NC State
PG	23	Mitchell Wiggins	6 ft 4 in (1.93 m)	185 lb (84 kg)	1959–09–28	Florida State
PF	55	Jayson Williams	6 ft 9 in (2.06 m)	240 lb (109 kg)	1968–02–22	St. John's

Coaches
Head coach
- Jim Lynam
Assistant(s)
- Buzz Braman
- Fred Carter

Legend
- (DP) Unsigned draft pick
- (FA) Free agent
- (S) Suspended
- Injured

== Regular season ==
=== Season standings ===
Atlantic Division	W	L	PCT	GB	Home	Road	Div
y-Boston Celtics	51	31	.622	—	34–7	17–24	19–9
x-New York Knicks	51	31	.622	—	30–11	21–20	20–8
x-New Jersey Nets	40	42	.488	11	25–16	15–26	15–13
x-Miami Heat	38	44	.463	13	28–13	10–31	14–14
Philadelphia 76ers	35	47	.427	16	23–18	12–29	15–13
Washington Bullets	25	57	.305	26	14–27	11–30	7–21
Orlando Magic	21	61	.256	30	13–28	8–33	8–20

y - clinched division title
x - clinched playoff spot

#	Eastern Conference				
#	Team	W	L	PCT	GB
1	z-Chicago Bulls	67	15	.817	–
2	y-Boston Celtics	51	31	.622	16
3	x-Cleveland Cavaliers	57	25	.695	10
4	x-New York Knicks	51	31	.622	16
5	x-Detroit Pistons	48	34	.585	19
6	x-New Jersey Nets	40	42	.488	27
7	x-Indiana Pacers	40	42	.488	27
8	x-Miami Heat	38	44	.463	29
9	Atlanta Hawks	38	44	.463	29
10	Philadelphia 76ers	35	47	.427	32
11	Milwaukee Bucks	31	51	.378	36
12	Charlotte Hornets	31	51	.378	36
13	Washington Bullets	25	57	.305	42
14	Orlando Magic	21	61	.256	46

z - clinched division title
y - clinched division title
x - clinched playoff spot

== Player statistics ==
Legend
GP	Games played	GS	Games started	MPG	Minutes per game
FG%	Field-goal percentage	3P%	3-point field-goal percentage	FT%	Free-throw percentage
RPG	Rebounds per game	APG	Assists per game	SPG	Steals per game
BPG	Blocks per game	PPG	Points per game

=== Regular season ===
Player	GP	GS	MPG	FG%	3P%	FT%	RPG	APG	SPG	BPG	PPG
Ron Anderson	82	11	29.7	.465	.331	.877	3.4	1.6	1.0	.1	13.7
Michael Ansley^{†}	8	0	4.0	.455		.833	.5	.3	.0	.0	1.9
Charles Barkley	75	75	38.4	.552	.234	.695	11.1	4.1	1.8	.6	23.1
Manute Bol	71	2	17.8	.383	.000	.462	3.1	.3	.2	2.9	1.5
Johnny Dawkins	82	82	34.3	.437	.356	.882	2.8	6.9	1.1	.1	12.0
Armen Gilliam	81	81	34.2	.511	.000	.807	8.1	1.5	.6	1.0	16.9
Greg Grant^{†}	55	0	15.2	.456	.389	.864	1.2	3.6	.7	.0	4.1
Hersey Hawkins	81	81	37.2	.462	.397	.874	3.3	3.1	1.9	.5	19.0
Dave Hoppen	11	0	3.6	.286		.500	.9	.2	.0	.0	.8
Tharon Mayes^{†}	21	0	10.2	.298	.359	.667	.7	1.5	.7	.0	4.3
Brian Oliver	34	0	8.2	.330	.000	.682	.9	.6	.3	.1	2.4
Kenny Payne	49	3	7.2	.448	.417	.692	1.1	.3	.3	.2	2.9
Jeff Ruland	13	5	16.1	.526		.688	3.6	.4	.5	.3	3.9
Charles Shackleford	72	62	19.4	.486	.000	.663	5.8	.6	.5	.7	6.6
Mitchell Wiggins	49	0	11.6	.384	.000	.686	1.9	.4	.4	.0	4.3
Jayson Williams	50	8	12.9	.364		.636	2.9	.2	.4	.4	4.1

- ^{†} Denotes player spent time with another team in the season. Stats reflect time with the 7ers only.

Player statistics citation:

== Awards and records ==
- Charles Barkley, All-NBA Second Team

== See also ==
- 1991–92 NBA season
