= 1991–92 Seattle SuperSonics season =

NBA basketball team season

- Head coach: K. C. Jones (fired); Bob Kloppenburg (interim); George Karl
- General manager: Bob Whitsitt
- Arena: Seattle Center Coliseum

Results
- Record: 47–35 (.573)
- Place: Division: 4th (Pacific); Conference: 6th (Western)
- Playoff finish: West Conference Semi-finals (lost to Jazz 1–4)
- Stats at Basketball Reference

Local media
- Television: KING-TV; Prime Sports Northwest
- Radio: KJR

The 1991–92 Seattle SuperSonics season was the 24th season for the Seattle SuperSonics in the National Basketball Association.

== Season summary ==
=== Off-season ===
The SuperSonics had the 14th overall pick in the 1991 NBA draft, and selected center Rich King from the University of Nebraska–Lincoln.

=== Regular season ===
The SuperSonics won seven of their first ten games of the regular season, but then lost eight of their next twelve games. Head coach K. C. Jones was fired after an 18–18 start to the season; after four games under assistant coach Bob Kloppenburg as an interim coach, the SuperSonics hired George Karl, who returned after a four-year absence from coaching in the NBA. Under Karl, the SuperSonics held a 24–24 record at the All-Star break, and finished in fourth place in the Pacific Division with a 47–35 record, earning the sixth seed in the Western Conference.

Ricky Pierce led the SuperSonics in scoring averaging 21.7 points per game, while sixth man Eddie Johnson averaged 17.1 points per game off the bench, and Shawn Kemp played most of the regular season off the bench averaging 15.5 points, 10.4 rebounds and 1.9 blocks per game. In addition, Derrick McKey provided the team with 14.9 points and 5.2 rebounds per game, but only played 52 games due to a thumb injury, while Benoit Benjamin provided with 14.0 points, 8.1 rebounds and 1.9 blocks per game, only playing in 63 games due to a broken hand injury, and second-year guard Gary Payton contributed 9.4 points, 6.2 assists and 1.8 steals per game. Meanwhile, Michael Cage averaged 8.8 points and 8.9 rebounds per game, Dana Barros contributed 8.3 points per game, and Nate McMillan provided with 6.0 points, 5.0 assists and 1.8 steals per game.

During the NBA All-Star weekend at the Orlando Arena in Orlando, Florida, Kemp participated in the NBA Slam Dunk Contest for the third consecutive year. Despite a stellar season, Pierce was not selected for the 1992 NBA All-Star Game. Karl finished in 13th place in Coach of the Year voting. The SuperSonics finished 19th in the NBA in home-game attendance, with an attendance of 588,928 at the Seattle Center Coliseum during the regular season.

=== NBA playoffs ===
In the Western Conference First Round of the 1992 NBA playoffs, the SuperSonics faced off against the 3rd–seeded Golden State Warriors, who were led by the trio of All-Star forward Chris Mullin, All-Star guard Tim Hardaway, and sixth man Šarūnas Marčiulionis. The SuperSonics managed to win Game 1 over the Warriors on the road, 117–109 at the Oakland-Alameda County Coliseum Arena, before losing Game 2 on the road by a score of 115–101, as the Warriors evened the series. The SuperSonics won the next two games at home, which included a Game 4 win over the Warriors at the Seattle Center Coliseum, 119–116 to win the series in four games.

In the Western Conference Semi-finals, the team faced off against the 2nd–seeded, and Midwest Division champion Utah Jazz, who were led by the trio of All-Star forward Karl Malone, All-Star guard John Stockton, and Jeff Malone. The SuperSonics lost the first two games to the Jazz on the road at the Delta Center, before winning Game 3 at the Seattle Center Coliseum, 104–98. However, the SuperSonics lost the next two games, including a Game 5 road loss to the Jazz at the Delta Center, 111–100, thus losing the series in five games.

== Draft picks ==
Round	Pick	Player	Position	Nationality	College
1	14	Rich King	C	United States	Nebraska

== Roster ==
1991–92 Seattle SuperSonics roster
Players

Pos.	No.	Player	Height	Weight	DOB	From
PG	11	Dana Barros	5 ft 11 in (1.80 m)	163 lb (74 kg)	1967–04–13	Boston College
C	00	Benoit Benjamin	7 ft 0 in (2.13 m)	250 lb (113 kg)	1964–11–22	Creighton
SF	21	Tony Brown	6 ft 6 in (1.98 m)	185 lb (84 kg)	1960–07–29	Arkansas
C	44	Michael Cage	6 ft 9 in (2.06 m)	224 lb (102 kg)	1962–01–28	San Diego State
C	24	Marty Conlon	6 ft 10 in (2.08 m)	224 lb (102 kg)	1968–01–19	Providence
SG	8	Eddie Johnson	6 ft 7 in (2.01 m)	215 lb (98 kg)	1959–05–01	Illinois
PF	40	Shawn Kemp	6 ft 10 in (2.08 m)	230 lb (104 kg)	1969–11–26	Trinity Valley CC
C	25	Rich King	7 ft 2 in (2.18 m)	260 lb (118 kg)	1969–04–04	Nebraska
SG	23	Bart Kofoed	6 ft 4 in (1.93 m)	210 lb (95 kg)	1964–03–24	Nebraska–Kearney
SF	31	Derrick McKey	6 ft 9 in (2.06 m)	205 lb (93 kg)	1966–10–10	Alabama
PG	10	Nate McMillan	6 ft 5 in (1.96 m)	195 lb (88 kg)	1964–08–03	NC State
PG	20	Gary Payton	6 ft 4 in (1.93 m)	180 lb (82 kg)	1968–07–23	Oregon State
SG	22	Ricky Pierce	6 ft 4 in (1.93 m)	205 lb (93 kg)	1959–08–19	Rice

Coaches
Head coach
- George Karl
Assistant(s)
- Bob Kloppenburg
- Kip Motta
- Gary Wortman

Legend
- (DP) Unsigned draft pick
- (FA) Free agent
- (S) Suspended
- Injured

== Regular season ==
=== Season standings ===
Pacific Division	W	L	PCT	GB	Home	Road	Div
y-Portland Trail Blazers	57	25	.695	—	33–8	24–17	21–9
x-Golden State Warriors	55	27	.671	2	31–10	24–17	19–11
x-Phoenix Suns	53	29	.646	4	36–5	17–24	17–13
x-Seattle SuperSonics	47	35	.573	10	28–13	19–22	16–14
x-Los Angeles Clippers	45	37	.549	12	29–12	16–25	13–17
x-Los Angeles Lakers	43	39	.524	14	24–17	19–22	13–17
Sacramento Kings	29	53	.354	28	21–20	8–33	6–24

y – clinched division title
x – clinched playoff spot

#	Western Conference				
#	Team	W	L	PCT	GB
1	c-Portland Trail Blazers	57	25	.695	–
2	y-Utah Jazz	55	27	.671	2
3	x-Golden State Warriors	55	27	.671	2
4	x-Phoenix Suns	53	29	.646	4
5	x-San Antonio Spurs	47	35	.573	10
6	x-Seattle SuperSonics	47	35	.573	10
7	x-Los Angeles Clippers	45	37	.549	12
8	x-Los Angeles Lakers	43	39	.524	14
9	Houston Rockets	42	40	.512	15
10	Sacramento Kings	29	53	.354	28
11	Denver Nuggets	24	58	.293	33
12	Dallas Mavericks	22	60	.268	35
13	Minnesota Timberwolves	15	67	.183	42

z – clinched division title
y – clinched division title
x – clinched playoff spot

=== Game log ===
1991–92 game log
Total: 47–35 (home: 28–13; road: 19–22)
November: 8–7 (home: 3–3; road: 5–4)

Game	Date	Team	Score	High points	High rebounds	High assists	Location Attendance	Record
1	November 1	Phoenix	L 95–99	Ricky Pierce (25)	Michael Cage (13)	Gary Payton (7)	Seattle Center Coliseum; 12,863	0–1
2	November 3	San Antonio	L 98–106	Derrick McKey (23)	Michael Cage (9)	Nate McMillan (10)	Seattle Center Coliseum; 12,863	0–2
3	November 5	Sacramento	W 98–87	Derrick McKey (20)	Michael Cage (16)	Gary Payton (9)	Seattle Center Coliseum; 9,343	1–2
4	November 7	@ Utah	W 103–95	Benoit Benjamin (22)	Benoit Benjamin (13)	Gary Payton (5)	Delta Center; 18,700	2–2
5	November 9	Indiana	W 118–111	Michael Cage (23)	Michael Cage (22)	Gary Payton (7)	Seattle Center Coliseum; 11,930	3–2
6	November 14	@ Cleveland	L 109-115 (OT)	Ricky Pierce (29)	Michael Cage (10)	Gary Payton (12)	Coliseum at Richfield; 10,838	3–3
7	November 15	@ Indiana	W 124–108	Ricky Pierce (34)	Michael Cage (14)	Gary Payton (15)	Market Square Arena; 10,877	4–3
8	November 17	@ Minnesota	W 101–91	Ricky Pierce (28)	Michael Cage (11)	Gary Payton (9)	Target Center; 19,006	5–3
9	November 19	@ Washington	W 113–106	Gary Payton (22)	Michael Cage (20)	Gary Payton (7)	Capital Centre; 7,015	6–3
10	November 20	@ Detroit	W 91–86	Ricky Pierce (18)	Michael Cage (9)	Nate McMillan, Gary Payton (4)	The Palace of Auburn Hills; 21,454	7–3
11	November 22	Chicago	L 109–112 (OT)	Ricky Pierce (30)	Benjamin, Cage (12)	Gary Payton (7)	Kingdome; 38,067	7–4
12	November 24	@ L. A. Clippers	L 86–89	Ricky Pierce (28)	Benoit Benjamin (15)	Benjamin, McMillan (5)	Los Angeles Memorial Sports Arena; 9,196	7–5
13	November 26	Golden State	W 136–130 (OT)	Eddie Johnson (29)	Derrick McKey (15)	Nate McMillan (9)	Seattle Center Coliseum; 11,743	8–5
14	November 29	@ Denver	L 90–101	Eddie Johnson (20)	Michael Cage (13)	Gary Payton (4)	McNichols Sports Arena; 10,613	8–6
15	November 30	@ San Antonio	L 101–119	Eddie Johnson (21)	Nate McMillan (10)	Gary Payton (5)	HemisFair Arena; 16,057	8–7

December : 8–6 (home: 7–1; road: 1–5)

Game	Date	Team	Score	High points	High rebounds	High assists	Location Attendance	Record
16	December 3	Washington	W 91–90	Ricky Pierce (26)	Shawn Kemp (12)	Gary Payton (5)	Seattle Center Coliseum; 10,957	9–7
17	December 6	Minnesota	W 96–94	Ricky Pierce (29)	Michael Cage (23)	Payton, Pierce (5)	Seattle Center Coliseum; 9,796	10–7
18	December 7	Dallas	W 104–101	Ricky Pierce (27)	Michael Cage (14)	Nate McMillan (6)	Seattle Center Coliseum; 12,313	11–7
19	December 10	@ Chicago	L 103–108	Ricky Pierce (30)	Michael Cage (13)	Kemp, Payton (5)	Chicago Stadium; 18,061	11–8
20	December 11	@ New York	L 87–96	Ricky Pierce (25)	Benjamin, Kemp (9)	Ricky Pierce (7)	Madison Square Garden; 14,934	11–9
21	December 13	@ Boston	L 97–117	Ricky Pierce (21)	Benoit Benjamin (8)	Nate McMillan (8)	Boston Garden; 14,890	11–10
22	December 14	@ Philadelphia	L 95–104	Benoit Benjamin (23)	Benoit Benjamin (9)	Nate McMillan (8)	The Spectrum; 12,395	11–11
23	December 17	L. A. Clippers	W 116–99	Benoit Benjamin (20)	Michael Cage (13)	Nate McMillan (6)	Seattle Center Coliseum; 10,357	12–11
24	December 19	Denver	W 119–106	Ricky Pierce (29)	Michael Cage (15)	McKey, McMillan, Payton (4)	Seattle Center Coliseum; 10,663	13–11
25	December 21	Golden State	W 120–112	Ricky Pierce (34)	Gary Payton (11)	Gary Payton (12)	Seattle Center Coliseum; 14,180	14–11
26	December 22	@ Portland	L 87–96	Benoit Benjamin (18)	Michael Cage (9)	Kofoed, Payton (5)	Memorial Coliseum; 12,888	14–12
27	December 26	@ Sacramento	W 115–106 (OT)	Ricky Pierce (27)	Benoit Benjamin (13)	Gary Payton (5)	ARCO Arena; 17,014	15–12
28	December 27	Boston	L 87–110	Ricky Pierce (26)	Derrick McKey (7)	Gary Payton (4)	Kingdome; 37,175	15–13

January : 7–10 (home: 3–6; road: 4–4)

Game	Date	Team	Score	High points	High rebounds	High assists	Location Attendance	Record
29	January 2	Miami	W 113–109 (OT)	Ricky Pierce (34)	Benoit Benjamin (15)	McMillan, Payton (4)	Seattle Center Coliseum; 10,787	16–13
30	January 4	Philadelphia	L 93–112	Derrick McKey (24)	Cage, Kemp (7)	Gary Payton (7)	Seattle Center Coliseum; 14,166	16–14
31	January 7	@ Denver	W 106–99	Ricky Pierce (28)	Shawn Kemp (11)	Gary Payton (4)	McNichols Sports Arena; 8,877	17–14
32	January 8	Orlando	L 103–104	Benoit Benjamin (24)	Shawn Kemp (8)	Gary Payton (9)	Seattle Center Coliseum; 9,958	17–15
33	January 10	@ Dallas	W 94–82	Eddie Johnson (19)	Shawn Kemp (13)	Gary Payton (9)	Reunion Arena	18–15
34	January 11	@ Houston	L 115–119	Eddie Johnson (28)	Benjamin, Cage (7)	Nate McMillan (8)	The Summit; 15,458	18–16
35	January 13	@ L. A. Clippers	L 94–98	Eddie Johnson (20)	Benjamin, Johnson, Kemp (10)	Gary Payton (8)	Los Angeles Memorial Sports Arena; 10,087	18–17
36	January 14	Charlotte	L 116–117 (OT)	Ricky Pierce (20)	Shawn Kemp (12)	Bart Kofoed (9)	Seattle Center Coliseum; 9,132	18–18
37	January 16	L. A. Clippers	W 101–98	Ricky Pierce (26)	Shawn Kemp (19)	Gary Payton (6)	Seattle Center Coliseum; 10,408	19–18
38	January 18	L. A. Lakers	W 112–108	Ricky Pierce (28)	Michael Cage (10)	Benoit Benjamin (4)	Seattle Center Coliseum; 14,533	20–18
39	January 20	@ L. A. Lakers	L 110–116	Eddie Johnson (29)	Shawn Kemp (15)	Gary Payton (6)	Great Western Forum; 17,236	20–19
40	January 21	Atlanta	L 119–128	Ricky Pierce (29)	Shawn Kemp (13)	Gary Payton (10)	Seattle Center Coliseum; 11,436	20–20
41	January 23	Portland	L 109–113	Shawn Kemp (26)	Johnson, Kemp (9)	Ricky Pierce (8)	Seattle Center Coliseum; 14,457	20–21
42	January 25	Utah	L 103–104	Benjamin, Pierce (22)	Shawn Kemp (12)	Gary Payton (8)	Seattle Center Coliseum; 14,084	20–22
43	January 28	@ Orlando	W 102–97	Eddie Johnson (39)	Eddie Johnson (11)	Gary Payton (7)	Orlando Arena; 15,151	21–22
44	January 29	@ Miami	L 114–119	Ricky Pierce (28)	Shawn Kemp (16)	Gary Payton (11)	Miami Arena; 14,728	21–23
45	January 31	@ Charlotte	W 122–105	Eddie Johnson (30)	Shawn Kemp (21)	Nate McMillan (8)	Charlotte Coliseum; 23,698	22–23

February : 9–3 (home: 5–0; road: 4–3)

Game	Date	Team	Score	High points	High rebounds	High assists	Location Attendance	Record
46	February 2	@ Milwaukee	L 106–122	Benoit Benjamin (19)	Benoit Benjamin (13)	Tony Brown (4)	Bradley Center; 17,832	22–24
47	February 3	@ Atlanta	W 112–110	Ricky Pierce (26)	Shawn Kemp (15)	Gary Payton (12)	Omni Coliseum; 9,951	23–24
48	February 5	@ New Jersey	W 95–85	Ricky Pierce (19)	Benoit Benjamin (10)	Nate McMillan (4)	Brendan Byrne Arena; 9,328	24–24
49	February 11	Houston	W 105–99	Ricky Pierce (31)	Shawn Kemp (10)	Johnson, McMillan, Payton (4)	Seattle Center Coliseum; 12,676	25–24
50	February 14	San Antonio	W 108–91	Ricky Pierce (23)	Michael Cage (10)	Nate McMillan (8)	Seattle Center Coliseum; 12,126	26–24
51	February 15	@ Golden State	L 122–140	Eddie Johnson (28)	Benoit Benjamin (11)	Gary Payton (10)	Oakland-Alameda County Arena; 15,025	26–25
52	February 17	Phoenix	W 98–96	Shawn Kemp (24)	Shawn Kemp (14)	Gary Payton (8)	Seattle Center Coliseum; 11,144	27–25
53	February 20	L. A. Lakers	W 105–103	Eddie Johnson (24)	Michael Cage (14)	Gary Payton (7)	Kingdome; 30,847	28–25
54	February 22	Portland	W 113–104	Eddie Johnson (29)	Benoit Benjamin (13)	McMillan, Payton (8)	Kingdome; 38,610	29–25
55	February 24	@ Minnesota	W 106–91	Eddie Johnson (26)	Shawn Kemp (15)	Nate McMillan (8)	Target Center; 18,082	30–25
56	February 27	@ Utah	W 130–124 (OT)	Eddie Johnson (32)	Shawn Kemp (9)	Nate McMillan, Gary Payton (7)	Delta Center; 19,911	31–25
57	February 29	@ Sacramento	L 110–115	Eddie Johnson (21)	Benoit Benjamin (8)	Gary Payton (7)	ARCO Arena; 17,014	31–26

March : 10–6 (home: 7–3; road: 3–3)

Game	Date	Team	Score	High points	High rebounds	High assists	Location Attendance	Record
58	March 1	Cleveland	W 113–107	Johnson, Pierce (22)	Benjamin, Cage (14)	Ricky Pierce (6)	Seattle Center Coliseum; 13,647	32–26
59	March 3	Denver	W 111–92	Shawn Kemp (21)	Shawn Kemp (13)	Gary Payton (9)	Seattle Center Coliseum; 9,865	33–26
60	March 5	@ Phoenix	L 105–118	Ricky Pierce (23)	Shawn Kemp (19)	Gary Payton (12)	Arizona Veterans Memorial Coliseum; 14,496	33–27
61	March 7	New Jersey	W 109–98	Ricky Pierce (27)	Michael Cage (13)	Nate McMillan (7)	Seattle Center Coliseum; 13,419	34–27
62	March 8	@ Portland	L 97–109	Ricky Pierce (28)	Ricky Pierce (10)	Gary Payton (7)	Memorial Coliseum; 12,888	34–28
63	March 10	Detroit	L 92–98	Gary Payton (19)	Shawn Kemp (9)	Nate McMillan (5)	Seattle Center Coliseum; 13,098	34–29
64	March 11	@ L. A. Clippers	W 104–96	Ricky Pierce (19)	Benjamin, Cage (6)	Gary Payton (9)	Los Angeles Memorial Sports Arena; 10,912	35–29
65	March 15	Dallas	W 109–100	Ricky Pierce (23)	Shawn Kemp (15)	Gary Payton (8)	Seattle Center Coliseum; 12,163	36–29
66	March 17	Golden State	L 107–119	Ricky Pierce (24)	Shawn Kemp (15)	Ricky Pierce (5)	Seattle Center Coliseum; 13,163	36–30
67	March 19	@ Houston	W 112–91	Ricky Pierce (22)	Cage, Kemp (14)	Gary Payton (11)	The Summit; 15,122	37–30
68	March 21	@ San Antonio	L 96–101	Eddie Johnson (23)	Shawn Kemp (13)	Barros, Cage, McMillan (4)	HemisFair Arena; 16,057	37–31
69	March 22	@ Dallas	W 113–105	Eddie Johnson (31)	Shawn Kemp (17)	Nate McMillan (8)	Reunion Arena; 14,345	38–31
70	March 24	Houston	W 128–106	Derrick McKey (23)	Cage, Kemp (11)	McMillan, Payton (7)	Seattle Center Coliseum; 11,377	39–31
71	March 27	Milwaukee	W 96–95	Eddie Johnson (21)	Nate McMillan (7)	Nate McMillan (6)	Seattle Center Coliseum; 11,450	40–31
72	March 28	New York Knicks	L 87–92	Shawn Kemp (27)	Shawn Kemp (12)	Nate McMillan (6)	Seattle Center Coliseum; 14,812	40–32
73	March 31	Utah	W 122–103	Barros, Johnson (18)	Kemp, Payton (10)	Payton (13)	Seattle Center Coliseum; 12,242	41–32

April : 6–3 (home: 4–0; road: 2–3)

Game	Date	Team	Score	High points	High rebounds	High assists	Location Attendance	Record
74	April 2	@ Sacramento	W 111–103	Eddie Johnson (28)	Shawn Kemp (11)	Ricky Pierce (9)	ARCO Arena; 17,014	42–32
75	April 3	@ L. A. Lakers	W 96–91	Eddie Johnson (24)	Shawn Kemp (14)	Nate McMillan (11)	Great Western Forum; 17,070	43–32
76	April 7	L. A. Lakers	117–88	Johnson, Gary Payton (18)	Shawn Kemp (12)	Gary Payton (7)	Seattle Center Coliseum; 12,335	44–32
77	April 9	Phoenix	119–104	Shawn Kemp (17)	Shawn Kemp (14)	Nate McMillan (12)	Seattle Center Coliseum; 11,223	45–32
78	April 10	@ Portland	L 103–113	Eddie Johnson (36)	Shawn Kemp (9)	Nate McMillan (12)	Memorial Coliseum; 12,888	45–33
79	April 12	Minnesota	W 126–116	Ricky Pierce (21)	Shawn Kemp (16)	Nate McMillan (10)	Seattle Center Coliseum; 11,391	46–33
80	April 14	@ Phoenix	L 100–122	Shawn Kemp (26)	Shawn Kemp (11)	Gary Payton (6)	Arizona Veterans Memorial Coliseum; 14,496	46–34
81	April 17	Sacramento	W 130–106	Shawn Kemp (24)	Shawn Kemp (14)	Nate McMillan (9)	Seattle Center Coliseum; 12,129	47–34
82	April 19	@ Golden State	L 106–108	Shawn Kemp (23)	Shawn Kemp (19)	Nate McMillan (9)	Oakland–Alameda County Coliseum Arena; 15,025	47–35

1991–92 season schedule

== Playoffs ==
1992 playoff game log
First round: 3–1 (home: 2–0; road: 1–1)

Game	Date	Team	Score	High points	High rebounds	High assists	Location Attendance	Series
1	April 23	@ Golden State	W 117–109	Kemp, Pierce (28)	Shawn Kemp (16)	Gary Payton (12)	Oakland–Alameda County Coliseum Arena; 15,025	1–0
2	April 25	@ Golden State	L 101–115	Eddie Johnson (22)	Shawn Kemp (19)	Ricky Pierce (7)	Oakland–Alameda County Coliseum Arena; 15,025	1–1
3	April 28	Golden State	W 129–128	Derrick McKey (27)	Shawn Kemp (10)	Nate McMillan (10)	Seattle Center Coliseum; 14,252	2–1
4	April 30	Golden State	W 119–116	Ricky Pierce (27)	Shawn Kemp (20)	Nate McMillan (10)	Seattle Center Coliseum; 14,252	3–1

Conference Semi-finals: 1–4 (home: 1–1; road: 0–3)

Game	Date	Team	Score	High points	High rebounds	High assists	Location Attendance	Series
1	May 6	@ Utah	L 100–108	Derrick McKey (20)	Shawn Kemp (15)	Nate McMillan (8)	Delta Center; 19,911	0–1
2	May 8	@ Utah	L 97–103	Eddie Johnson (26)	Shawn Kemp (9)	Payton, Pierce (3)	Delta Center; 19,911	0–2
3	May 10	Utah	W 104–98	Ricky Pierce (31)	Benoit Benjamin (8)	McMillan, Payton (6)	Seattle Center Coliseum; 14,104	1–2
4	May 12	Utah	L 83–89	Ricky Pierce (21)	Shawn Kemp (11)	Nate McMillan (9)	Seattle Center Coliseum; 14,252	1–3
5	May 14	@ Utah	L 100–111	Eddie Johnson (26)	Michael Cage (11)	Nate McMillan (12)	Delta Center; 19,911	1–4

1992 schedule

== Player statistics ==
Legend
GP	Games played	GS	Games started	MPG	Minutes per game
FG%	Field-goal percentage	3P%	3-point field-goal percentage	FT%	Free-throw percentage
RPG	Rebounds per game	APG	Assists per game	SPG	Steals per game
BPG	Blocks per game	PPG	Points per game

=== Season ===
Player	GP	GS	MPG	FG%	3P%	FT%	RPG	APG	SPG	BPG	PPG
Dana Barros	75	1	17.7	.483	.446	.759	1.1	1.7	0.7	0.1	8.3
Benoit Benjamin	63	61	30.8	.478	.000	.687	8.1	1.2	0.6	1.9	14.0
Tony Brown*	35	2	11.5	.394	.293	.811	1.6	0.9	0.5	0.1	4.8
Michael Cage	82	69	30.0	.566	.000	.620	8.9	1.1	1.2	0.7	8.8
Marty Conlon	45	1	8.5	.475	.000	.750	1.5	0.3	0.2	0.2	2.7
Quintin Dailey*	11	1	8.9	.243	.000	.813	1.1	0.4	0.5	0.1	2.8
Eddie Johnson	81	19	29.2	.459	.252	.861	3.6	2.0	0.7	0.1	17.1
Shawn Kemp	64	23	28.3	.504	.000	.748	10.4	1.3	1.1	1.9	15.5
Rich King	40	2	5.3	.380	.000	.756	1.2	0.3	0.1	0.1	2.2
Bart Kofoed	44	0	5.4	.472	.143	.577	0.6	1.2	0.0	0.0	1.5
Derrick McKey	52	44	33.8	.472	.380	.847	5.2	2.3	1.2	0.9	14.9
Nate McMillan	72	30	22.9	.437	.276	.643	3.5	5.0	1.8	0.4	6.0
Gary Payton	81	79	31.5	.451	.130	.669	3.6	6.2	1.8	0.3	9.4
Ricky Pierce	78	78	34.1	.475	.268	.916	3.0	3.1	1.1	0.3	21.7

* Statistics with the Seattle SuperSonics.

=== Playoffs ===
Player	GP	GS	MPG	FG%	3P%	FT%	RPG	APG	SPG	BPG	PPG
Dana Barros	7	0	13.7	.525	.588	.000	1.0	1.1	0.6	0.0	7.4
Benoit Benjamin	9	4	17.9	.561	.000	.500	5.1	0.6	0.6	1.4	6.1
Tony Brown	5	0	4.4	.333	.250	.571	0.4	0.4	0.0	0.0	1.8
Michael Cage	9	4	21.9	.559	.000	1.000	5.7	0.4	0.7	0.9	4.3
Marty Conlon	1	0	1.0	.000	.000	1.000	1.0	0.0	0.0	0.0	2.0
Eddie Johnson	9	0	27.4	.474	.182	.941	3.0	0.9	0.3	0.3	18.4
Shawn Kemp	9	9	37.6	.475	.000	.763	12.2	0.4	0.6	1.6	17.4
Derrick McKey	9	9	35.0	.525	.313	.844	4.9	2.7	0.8	1.3	16.3
Nate McMillan	9	2	27.3	.422	.231	.714	3.7	7.0	1.8	0.3	9.6
Gary Payton	8	8	27.6	.466	.000	.583	2.6	4.8	1.0	0.3	7.6
Ricky Pierce	9	9	35.1	.481	.273	.870	2.4	3.1	0.6	0.1	19.6

Player statistics citation:

== Awards and records ==
=== Records ===
- Michael Cage finished the season with a franchise record .566 in field goal percentage.

== Transactions ==
=== Overview ===
Players added

Via draft

- Rich King

Via free agency

- Bart Kofoed
- Marty Conlon
- Tony Brown
Players Lost

Via trade

- Sedale Threatt

Via waivers

- Quintin Dailey

=== Trades ===
October 2, 1991	To Seattle SuperSonics Conditional 1993, 1995 and 1996 second-round picks	To Los Angeles Lakers Sedale Threatt

=== Free agents ===
==== Additions ====
Player	Signed	Former team
Bart Kofoed	August 23, 1991	Utah Jazz
Marty Conlon	October 1, 1991	
Tony Brown	February 20, 1992	

=== Waivings ===
Player	Left
Quintin Dailey	December 10, 1991

Player Transactions Citation:

== See also ==
- 1991–92 NBA season
