= 1991–92 Dallas Mavericks season =

NBA professional basketball team season

- Head coach: Richie Adubato
- General manager: Norm Sonju
- Owner: Don Carter
- Arena: Reunion Arena

Results
- Record: 22–60 (.268)
- Place: Division: 5th (Midwest); Conference: 12th (Western)
- Playoff finish: Did not qualify
- Stats at Basketball Reference

Local media
- Television: KTVT; Home Sports Entertainment (Allen Stone, Bill Walton)
- Radio: WBAP (Allen Stone, Bill Walton)

The 1991–92 Dallas Mavericks season was the 12th season for the Dallas Mavericks in the National Basketball Association.

== Season summary ==
=== Off-season ===
The Mavericks received the sixth overall pick in the 1991 NBA draft, and selected power forward Doug Smith from the University of Missouri. During the off-season, the team signed free agent Terry Davis. Prior to the start of the regular season, Roy Tarpley was banned from the NBA for violating the league's substance abuse policy for a third time.

=== Regular season ===
With the addition of Smith and Davis, the Mavericks got off to a 12–15 start to the season, but then struggled posting an 11-game losing streak afterwards, as Fat Lever only played just 31 games due to injury. The team posted an eight-game losing streak between January and February, and held a 13–34 record at the All-Star break. At mid-season, the team signed undrafted rookie shooting guard Tracy Moore, and then traded James Donaldson to the New York Knicks in exchange for Brian Quinnett. The Mavericks suffered a 15-game losing streak in March, and finished in fifth place in the Midwest Division with a 22–60 record.

Rolando Blackman led the Mavericks in scoring with 18.3 points per game, while Derek Harper averaged 17.7 points, 5.7 assists and 1.6 steals per game, and Herb Williams provided the team with 11.5 points, 6.1 rebounds and 1.3 blocks per game. In addition, Lever contributed 11.2 points, 5.2 rebounds, 3.5 assists and 1.5 steals per game, while Davis provided with 10.2 points and 9.9 rebounds per game, and rookie point guard, and second-round draft pick Mike Iuzzolino contributed 9.3 points and 3.7 assists per game. Meanwhile, Rodney McCray averaged 9.0 points and 6.2 rebounds per game, Smith provided with 8.8 points and 5.1 rebounds per game, Moore contributed 8.5 points per game in 42 games, rookie center, and second-round draft pick Donald Hodge averaged 8.4 points and 5.4 rebounds per game, and Randy White provided with 6.4 points and 3.6 rebounds per game.

The Mavericks finished twelfth in the NBA in home-game attendance, with an attendance of 634,380 at the Reunion Arena during the regular season.

=== Aftermath ===
Following the season, Blackman was traded to the New York Knicks on draft day, while Williams signed as a free agent with the Knicks, McCray was traded to the Chicago Bulls in a three-team trade, Quinnett was released to free agency, and Brad Davis, the last of the original Mavericks, retired. This was also the final season in which the Mavericks sported green primary road uniforms.

== Draft picks ==
Round	Pick	Player	Position	Nationality	College
1	6	Doug Smith	PF	United States	Missouri
2	33	Donald Hodge	C	United States	Temple
2	35	Mike Iuzzolino	PG	United States	St. Francis (PA)

== Roster ==
1991–92 Dallas Mavericks roster
Players

Pos.	No.	Player	Height	Weight	DOB	From
SF	22	Rolando Blackman	6 ft 6 in (1.98 m)	190 lb (86 kg)	1959–02–26	Kansas State
PG	15	Brad Davis	6 ft 3 in (1.91 m)	180 lb (82 kg)	1955–12–17	Maryland
PF	43	Terry Davis	6 ft 9 in (2.06 m)	225 lb (102 kg)	1967–06–17	Virginia Union
SG	12	Derek Harper	6 ft 4 in (1.93 m)	185 lb (84 kg)	1961–10–13	Illinois
C	35	Donald Hodge	7 ft 0 in (2.13 m)	230 lb (104 kg)	1969–02–25	Temple
SF	41	Brian Howard	6 ft 6 in (1.98 m)	204 lb (93 kg)	1967–10–19	NC State
PG	55	Mike Iuzzolino	5 ft 10 in (1.78 m)	175 lb (79 kg)	1968–01–22	Saint Francis (PA)
PG	21	Fat Lever (injured)	6 ft 3 in (1.91 m)	170 lb (77 kg)	1960–08–18	Arizona State
SF	1	Rodney McCray	6 ft 7 in (2.01 m)	220 lb (100 kg)	1961–08–29	Louisville
SF	20	Tracy Moore	6 ft 4 in (1.93 m)	200 lb (91 kg)	1965–12–28	Tulsa
SF	23	Brian Quinnett	6 ft 8 in (2.03 m)	235 lb (107 kg)	1966–05–30	Washington State
PF	34	Doug Smith	6 ft 10 in (2.08 m)	220 lb (100 kg)	1969–09–17	Missouri
PF	33	Randy White	6 ft 8 in (2.03 m)	240 lb (109 kg)	1967–11–04	Louisiana Tech
C	32	Herb Williams	6 ft 10 in (2.08 m)	242 lb (110 kg)	1958–02–16	Ohio State

Coaches
Head coach
- Richie Adubato
Assistant(s)
- Gar Heard
- Clifford Ray
- Bob Zuffelato

Legend
- (DP) Unsigned draft pick
- (FA) Free agent
- (S) Suspended
- (L) On leave from the team
- Injured

Roster
Updated: March 22, 1992

== Regular season ==
=== Season standings ===
Midwest Division	W	L	PCT	GB	Home	Road	Div
y-Utah Jazz	55	27	.671	—	37–4	18–23	20–6
x-San Antonio Spurs	47	35	.573	8	31–10	16–25	18–8
Houston Rockets	42	40	.512	13	28–13	14–27	12–14
Denver Nuggets	24	58	.293	31	18–23	6–35	8–18
Dallas Mavericks	22	60	.268	33	15–26	7–34	11–15
Minnesota Timberwolves	15	67	.183	40	9–32	6–35	9–17

y - clinched division title
x - clinched playoff spot

#	Western Conference				
#	Team	W	L	PCT	GB
1	c-Portland Trail Blazers	57	25	.695	–
2	y-Utah Jazz	55	27	.671	2
3	x-Golden State Warriors	55	27	.671	2
4	x-Phoenix Suns	53	29	.646	4
5	x-San Antonio Spurs	47	35	.573	10
6	x-Seattle SuperSonics	47	35	.573	10
7	x-Los Angeles Clippers	45	37	.549	12
8	x-Los Angeles Lakers	43	39	.524	14
9	Houston Rockets	42	40	.512	15
10	Sacramento Kings	29	53	.354	28
11	Denver Nuggets	24	58	.293	33
12	Dallas Mavericks	22	60	.268	35
13	Minnesota Timberwolves	15	67	.183	42

z - clinched division title
y - clinched division title
x - clinched playoff spot

=== Game log ===
1991–92 game log
Total: 22–60 (Home: 0–0; Road: 0–0)
November: 0–0 (home: 0–0; road: 0–0)

Game	Date	Team	Score	High points	High rebounds	High assists	Location Attendance	Record

December: 0–0 (home: 0–0; road: 0–0)

Game	Date	Team	Score	High points	High rebounds	High assists	Location Attendance	Record

January: 0–0 (home: 0–0; road: 0–0)

Game	Date	Team	Score	High points	High rebounds	High assists	Location Attendance	Record

February: 0–0 (home: 0–0; road: 0–0)

Game	Date	Team	Score	High points	High rebounds	High assists	Location Attendance	Record

March: 0–0 (home: 0–0; road: 0–0)

Game	Date	Team	Score	High points	High rebounds	High assists	Location Attendance	Record

April: 0–0 (home: 0–0; road: 0–0)

Game	Date	Team	Score	High points	High rebounds	High assists	Location Attendance	Record

1991–92 schedule

== Player statistics ==
=== Regular season ===
Player	POS	GP	GS	MP	REB	AST	STL	BLK	PTS	MPG	RPG	APG	SPG	BPG	PPG
Doug Smith	PF	76	32	1,707	391	129	62	34	671	22.5	5.1	1.7	.8	.4	8.8
Rolando Blackman	SG	75	74	2,527	239	204	50	22	1,374	33.7	3.2	2.7	.7	.3	18.3
Rodney McCray	SF	75	48	2,106	468	219	48	30	677	28.1	6.2	2.9	.6	.4	9.0
Herb Williams	C	75	26	2,040	454	94	35	98	859	27.2	6.1	1.3	.5	1.3	11.5
Terry Davis	PF	68	67	2,149	672	57	26	29	693	31.6	9.9	.8	.4	.4	10.2
Derek Harper	PG	65	64	2,252	170	373	101	17	1,152	34.6	2.6	5.7	1.6	.3	17.7
Randy White	PF	65	12	1,021	236	31	31	22	418	15.7	3.6	.5	.5	.3	6.4
Mike Iuzzolino	PG	52	21	1,280	98	194	33	1	486	24.6	1.9	3.7	.6	.0	9.3
Donald Hodge	PF	51	27	1,058	275	39	25	23	426	20.7	5.4	.8	.5	.5	8.4
James Donaldson^{†}	C	44	32	994	270	31	8	44	273	22.6	6.1	.7	.2	1.0	6.2
Tracy Moore	SF	42	2	782	82	48	32	4	355	18.6	2.0	1.1	.8	.1	8.5
Brad Davis	PG	33	0	429	33	66	11	3	92	13.0	1.0	2.0	.3	.1	2.8
Fat Lever	SG	31	5	884	161	107	46	12	347	28.5	5.2	3.5	1.5	.4	11.2
Brian Howard	SF	27	0	318	51	14	11	8	131	11.8	1.9	.5	.4	.3	4.9
Brian Quinnett^{†}	SG	15	0	136	27	5	9	2	41	9.1	1.8	.3	.6	.1	2.7
Tom Garrick^{†}	SG	6	0	63	6	17	8	0	10	10.5	1.0	2.8	1.3	.0	1.7
João Vianna	SF	1	0	9	0	2	0	0	2	9.0	.0	2.0	.0	.0	2.0

- ^{†} Denotes player spent time with another team in the season. Stats reflect time with the Mavericks only.

== See also ==
- 1991-92 NBA season
