= 1991–92 Denver Nuggets season =

NBA professional basketball team season

- Head coach: Paul Westhead
- President: Bernie Bickerstaff
- General manager: Bernie Bickerstaff
- Arena: McNichols Sports Arena

Results
- Record: 24–58 (.293)
- Place: Division: 5th (Midwest); Conference: 11th (Western)
- Playoff finish: Did not qualify
- Stats at Basketball Reference

Local media
- Television: KWGN-TV; Prime Sports Rocky Mountain
- Radio: KOA

The 1991–92 Denver Nuggets season was the 16th season for the Denver Nuggets in the National Basketball Association, and their 25th season as a franchise.

== Season summary ==
=== Off-season ===
The Nuggets received the fourth overall pick in the 1991 NBA draft, and selected 7' 2" center Dikembe Mutombo out of Georgetown University; the team also selected shooting guard Mark Macon out of Temple University with the eighth overall pick, which was acquired from the Washington Bullets via trade. Mutombo was a native of Zaire, and spoke nine languages (English, French, Portuguese, Spanish, and five African dialects). During the off-season, the Nuggets re-signed former All-Star guard Walter Davis after a brief stint with the Portland Trail Blazers, and acquired Winston Garland from the Los Angeles Clippers on draft day.

=== Regular season ===
With the addition of Mutombo, Macon and Garland, the Nuggets showed improvement playing around .500 in winning percentage with an 8–8 start to the regular season. However, the team soon fell below .500, and later on held a 17–29 record at the All-Star break. The Nuggets struggled posting a six-game losing streak between January and February, then posted a nine-game losing streak between February and March, and then posted an 11-game losing streak between March and April. The Nuggets lost 29 of their final 36 games of the season after the All-Star break, and finished in fourth place in the Midwest Division with a 24–58 record.

Reggie Williams averaged 18.2 points, 5.0 rebounds and 1.8 steals per game, while Mutombo averaged 16.6 points, 12.3 rebounds and 3.0 blocks per game, and was named to the NBA All-Rookie First Team. In addition, Greg Anderson provided the team with 11.5 points and rebounds per game each, while Macon contributed 10.6 points and 2.0 steals per game, and was named to the NBA All-Rookie Second Team, but only shot .375 in field-goal percentage, and Garland provided with 10.8 points, 5.3 assists and 1.3 steals per game. Off the bench, second-year guard Chris Jackson contributed 10.3 points and 2.4 assists per game, while second-year forward Marcus Liberty averaged 9.3 points and 4.1 rebounds per game, Davis provided with 9.9 points per game, Todd Lichti contributed 6.6 points per game, and Joe Wolf averaged 3.8 points and 3.6 rebounds per game; Wolf struggled shooting .361 in field-goal percentage.

During the NBA All-Star weekend at the Orlando Arena in Orlando, Florida, Mutombo was selected for the 1992 NBA All-Star Game, as a member of the Western Conference All-Star team; it was his first ever All-Star appearance. Mutombo also finished in second place in Rookie of the Year voting, behind Larry Johnson of the Charlotte Hornets, while Williams finished tied in fourth place in Most Improved Player voting.

The Nuggets finished 21st in the NBA in home-game attendance, with an attendance of 534,323 at the McNichols Sports Arena during the regular season.

=== Aftermath ===
Following the season, Davis retired, while Anderson, Garland and Wolf were all released to free agency, and head coach Paul Westhead was fired.

== Draft picks ==
Round	Pick	Player	Position	Nationality	School/Club team
1	4	Dikembe Mutombo	C	Zaire	Georgetown
1	8	Mark Macon	SG	United States	Temple

== Roster ==
1991–92 Denver Nuggets roster
Players

Pos.	No.	Player	Height	Weight	DOB	From
PF	33	Greg Anderson	6 ft 10 in (2.08 m)	230 lb (104 kg)	1964–06–22	Houston
SF	43	Kevin Brooks	6 ft 8 in (2.03 m)	210 lb (95 kg)	1969–10–12	Louisiana
PF	45	Anthony Cook	6 ft 9 in (2.06 m)	205 lb (93 kg)	1967–03–19	Arizona
SG	6	Walter Davis	6 ft 6 in (1.98 m)	193 lb (88 kg)	1954–09–09	North Carolina
PG	12	Winston Garland	6 ft 2 in (1.88 m)	170 lb (77 kg)	1964–12–19	Missouri State
PF	10	Scott Hastings	6 ft 10 in (2.08 m)	235 lb (107 kg)	1960–06–03	Arkansas
PG	3	Chris Jackson	6 ft 1 in (1.85 m)	162 lb (73 kg)	1969–03–09	LSU
SF	30	Marcus Liberty	6 ft 8 in (2.03 m)	205 lb (93 kg)	1968–10–27	Illinois
SG	21	Todd Lichti	6 ft 4 in (1.93 m)	205 lb (93 kg)	1967–01–08	Stanford
SG	1	Mark Macon	6 ft 4 in (1.93 m)	185 lb (84 kg)	1969–04–14	Temple
C	55	Dikembe Mutombo	7 ft 2 in (2.18 m)	245 lb (111 kg)	1966–06–25	Georgetown
C	50	Steve Scheffler	6 ft 9 in (2.06 m)	250 lb (113 kg)	1967–09–03	Purdue
SF	34	Reggie Williams	6 ft 7 in (2.01 m)	190 lb (86 kg)	1964–03–05	Georgetown
C	42	Joe Wolf	6 ft 11 in (2.11 m)	230 lb (104 kg)	1964–12–17	North Carolina

Coaches
Head coach
- Paul Westhead
Assistant(s)
- Jim Boyle
- Mike Evans
- Judas Prada

Legend
- (DP) Unsigned draft pick
- (FA) Free agent
- (S) Suspended
- Injured

Roster
Updated: March 17, 1992

== Regular season ==
=== Season standings ===
Midwest Division	W	L	PCT	GB	Home	Road	Div
y-Utah Jazz	55	27	.671	—	37–4	18–23	20–6
x-San Antonio Spurs	47	35	.573	8	31–10	16–25	18–8
Houston Rockets	42	40	.512	13	28–13	14–27	12–14
Denver Nuggets	24	58	.293	31	18–23	6–35	8–18
Dallas Mavericks	22	60	.268	33	15–26	7–34	11–15
Minnesota Timberwolves	15	67	.183	40	9–32	6–35	9–17

y - clinched division title
x - clinched playoff spot

#	Western Conference				
#	Team	W	L	PCT	GB
1	c-Portland Trail Blazers	57	25	.695	–
2	y-Utah Jazz	55	27	.671	2
3	x-Golden State Warriors	55	27	.671	2
4	x-Phoenix Suns	53	29	.646	4
5	x-San Antonio Spurs	47	35	.573	10
6	x-Seattle SuperSonics	47	35	.573	10
7	x-Los Angeles Clippers	45	37	.549	12
8	x-Los Angeles Lakers	43	39	.524	14
9	Houston Rockets	42	40	.512	15
10	Sacramento Kings	29	53	.354	28
11	Denver Nuggets	24	58	.293	33
12	Dallas Mavericks	22	60	.268	35
13	Minnesota Timberwolves	15	67	.183	42

z - clinched division title
y - clinched division title
x - clinched playoff spot

== Player statistics ==
Legend
GP	Games played	GS	Games started	MPG	Minutes per game
FG%	Field-goal percentage	3P%	3-point field-goal percentage	FT%	Free-throw percentage
RPG	Rebounds per game	APG	Assists per game	SPG	Steals per game
BPG	Blocks per game	PPG	Points per game

=== Regular season ===
Player	GP	GS	MPG	FG%	3FG%	FT%	RPG	APG	SPG	BPG	PPG
Reggie Williams	81	80	32.4	.471	.359	.803	5.0	2.9	1.8	0.8	18.2
Dikembe Mutombo	71	71	38.3	.493		.642	12.3	2.2	0.6	3.0	16.6
Greg Anderson	82	82	34.1	.456	.000	.623	11.5	1.0	1.1	0.8	11.5
Winston Garland	78	67	28.3	.444	.321	.859	2.4	5.3	1.3	0.3	10.8
Mark Macon	76	67	30.3	.375	.133	.730	2.9	2.2	2.0	0.2	10.6
Mahmoud Abdul-Rauf	81	11	19.0	.421	.330	.870	1.4	2.4	0.5	0.0	10.3
Walter Davis	46	0	16.1	.459	.313	.872	1.5	1.5	0.6	0.0	9.9
Marcus Liberty	75	13	20.4	.443	.340	.728	4.1	0.8	0.9	0.4	9.3
Todd Lichti	68	10	17.3	.460	.111	.839	1.7	1.1	0.6	0.2	6.6
Joe Wolf	67	0	17.3	.361	.091	.803	3.6	0.9	0.5	0.2	3.8
Jerome Lane	9	5	15.7	.250		.421	4.9	1.4	0.2	0.1	3.1
Kevin Brooks	37	0	7.3	.443	.182	.810	1.1	0.3	0.2	0.1	2.8
Steve Scheffler	7	0	6.6	.571		.667	1.6	0.0	0.4	0.0	1.7
Scott Hastings	40	4	10.5	.340	.000	.857	2.5	0.7	0.3	0.4	1.5
Anthony Cook	22	0	5.2	.600		.667	1.5	0.1	0.2	0.2	1.5

Player statistics citation:

== Awards, records, and honors ==
- Dikembe Mutombo, NBA All-Rookie Team 1st Team
- Mark Macon, NBA All-Rookie Team 2nd Team
