= Rich King (basketball) =

American basketball player (born 1969)

Personal information
- Born: April 4, 1969 (age 57) Lincoln, Nebraska, U.S.
- Listed height: 7 ft 2 in (2.18 m)
- Listed weight: 260 lb (118 kg)

Career information
- High school: Harry A. Burke (Omaha, Nebraska)
- College: Nebraska (1987–1991)
- NBA draft: 1991: 1st round, 14th overall pick
- Drafted by: Seattle SuperSonics
- Playing career: 1991–2004
- Position: Center
- Number: 25, 45

Career history
- 1991–1995: Seattle SuperSonics
- 1995–1998, 2003–2004: Sioux Falls Skyforce

Career highlights
- CBA champion (1996)
- Stats at NBA.com
- Stats at Basketball Reference

Thomas Richard King (born April 4, 1969) is an American former professional basketball player who was selected by the Seattle SuperSonics in the first round (14th pick overall) of the 1991 NBA draft out of the University of Nebraska–Lincoln. Born in Lincoln and raised in Omaha, King was a high school standout in Nebraska. A 7'2", 260-lb. center, King played four seasons with the Sonics, appearing in a total of 72 games and averaging 1.9 ppg. King's professional career was cut short by injuries, undergoing 6 surgeries over his 7 years in the NBA.

King won a Continental Basketball Association (CBA) championship with the Sioux Falls Skyforce in 1996.

After his playing career ended, King continued to reside in Seattle, working in real estate. He now works for Amazon as Director of Business Development for their Amazon Alexa division. He has expressed interest in becoming a minority owner in the Seattle NBA team if one returns to the city.

== Career statistics ==
Legend
GP	Games played	GS	Games started	MPG	Minutes per game
FG%	Field goal percentage	3P%	3-point field goal percentage	FT%	Free throw percentage
RPG	Rebounds per game	APG	Assists per game	SPG	Steals per game
BPG	Blocks per game	PPG	Points per game	**Bold**	Career high

=== NBA ===
==== Regular season ====
Year	Team	GP	GS	MPG	FG%	3P%	FT%	RPG	APG	SPG	BPG	PPG
1991–92	Seattle	**40**	**2**	**5.3**	.380	.000	.756	1.2	**.3**	**.1**	**.1**	**2.2**
1992–93	Seattle	3	0	4.0	.400	–	**1.000**	**1.7**	**.3**	.0	.0	2.0
1993–94	Seattle	27	0	2.9	**.441**	.000	.500	.7	**.3**	.0	**.1**	1.5
1994–95	Seattle	2	0	3.0	.000	–	.000	.0	.0	.0	.0	.0
Career		72	2	4.3	.393	.000	.662	1.0	.3	.1	.1	1.9
