= 1991–92 Los Angeles Clippers season =

NBA professional basketball team season

- Head coach: Mike Schuler (fired); Mack Calvin (interim); Larry Brown
- Owners: Donald Sterling
- Arena: Los Angeles Memorial Sports Arena

Results
- Record: 45–37 (.549)
- Place: Division: 5th (Pacific); Conference: 7th (Western)
- Playoff finish: West First Round (lost to Jazz 2–3)
- Stats at Basketball Reference

Local media
- Television: KCOP-TV (Ralph Lawler, Mike Fratello); SportsChannel Los Angeles (Joel Meyers, Jerry Tarkanian)
- Radio: KRLA (Rich Marotta)

The 1991–92 Los Angeles Clippers season was the 22nd season for the Los Angeles Clippers in the National Basketball Association, and their eighth season in Los Angeles, California.

== Season summary ==
=== Off-season ===
During the off-season, the Clippers acquired Doc Rivers from the Atlanta Hawks on draft day, and acquired James Edwards from the Detroit Pistons.

=== Regular season ===
With the addition of Rivers and Edwards, the Clippers won five of their first seven games of the regular season. The team posted a six-game losing streak afterwards, but soon posted an eight-game winning streak between November and December, which led them to a 14–10 start to the season. However, the Clippers struggled and soon fell below .500 in winning percentage with a 21–24 record as head coach Mike Schuler was fired. After two games under assistant coach Mack Calvin as an interim coach, and holding a 22–25 record at the All-Star break, the team hired Larry Brown, who resigned as head coach of the San Antonio Spurs a few weeks earlier.

Under Brown, the Clippers won 23 of their final 35 games of the season, and finished in fifth place in the Pacific Division with a 45–37 record, earning the seventh seed in the Western Conference. The team qualified for their first NBA playoff appearance since the 1975–76 season, when they were known as the Buffalo Braves, and ending a fifteen-year playoff drought. This season was also their first to finish with a winning record above .500 since the 1978–79 season, when they were known as the San Diego Clippers, and also marked the first time that they finished with a better record than their crosstown rival, the Los Angeles Lakers, who finished two games behind them with a 43–39 record.

Danny Manning averaged 19.2 points, 6.9 rebounds, 3.5 assists, 1.6 steals and 1.5 blocks per game, while Ron Harper averaged 18.2 points, 5.5 rebounds, 5.1 assists and 1.9 steals per game, and Charles D. Smith provided the team with 14.6 points, 6.1 rebounds and 2.0 blocks per game, but only played just 49 games due to a knee injury. In addition, Ken Norman contributed 12.1 points and 5.8 rebounds per game, while Rivers provided with 10.9 points, 3.9 assists and 1.9 steals per game, Olden Polynice averaged 8.1 points and 7.1 rebounds per game, and Gary Grant contributed 7.8 points, 6.9 assists and 1.8 steals per game. Meanwhile, Edwards averaged 9.7 points per game off the bench, and second-year forward Loy Vaught provided with 7.6 points and 6.5 rebounds per game.

Manning finished tied in 16th place in Most Valuable Player voting, while Brown finished in fourth place in Coach of the Year voting. The Clippers finished last in the NBA in home-game attendance, with an attendance of 500,200 at the Los Angeles Memorial Sports Arena during the regular season, which was 27th in the league.

=== NBA playoffs ===
In the Western Conference First Round of the 1992 NBA playoffs, the Clippers faced off against the 2nd–seeded, and Midwest Division champion Utah Jazz, who were led by the trio of All-Star forward Karl Malone, All-Star guard John Stockton, and Jeff Malone. The Clippers lost the first two games to the Jazz on the road at the Delta Center, before winning Game 3 at home, 98–88 at the Los Angeles Memorial Sports Arena. Game 4 of the series was played at the Anaheim Convention Center in Anaheim, California, due to the 1992 Los Angeles riots; the Clippers defeated the Jazz by a score of 115–107 to even the series. However, the Clippers lost Game 5 to the Jazz at the Delta Center, 98–89, thus losing in a hard-fought five-game series.

=== Aftermath ===
Following the season, Smith, Rivers, and second-year guard Bo Kimble were all traded to the New York Knicks in a three-team trade, while Edwards signed as a free agent with the Los Angeles Lakers, and Polynice was traded to the Detroit Pistons on draft day.

== Draft picks ==
Round	Pick	Player	Position	Nationality	College
1	22	LeRon Ellis	C/PF	United States	Syracuse
2	37	Elliot Perry	PG	United States	Memphis
2	38	Joe Wylie	PF	United States	Miami (FL)

== Roster ==
1991–92 Los Angeles Clippers roster
Players

Pos.	No.	Player	Height	Weight	DOB	From
C	53	James Edwards	7 ft 0 in (2.13 m)	225 lb (102 kg)	1955–11–22	Washington
PF	22	LeRon Ellis	6 ft 10 in (2.08 m)	240 lb (109 kg)	1969–04–28	Syracuse
PG	23	Gary Grant	6 ft 3 in (1.91 m)	185 lb (84 kg)	1965–04–21	Michigan
SG	4	Ron Harper	6 ft 6 in (1.98 m)	185 lb (84 kg)	1964–01–20	Miami (OH)
SG	30	Bo Kimble	6 ft 4 in (1.93 m)	190 lb (86 kg)	1966–04–09	Loyola Marymount
PF	5	Danny Manning	6 ft 10 in (2.08 m)	230 lb (104 kg)	1966–05–17	Kansas
SF	3	Ken Norman	6 ft 8 in (2.03 m)	215 lb (98 kg)	1964–09–05	Illinois
C	0	Olden Polynice	6 ft 11 in (2.11 m)	220 lb (100 kg)	1964–11–21	Virginia
PG	32	David Rivers	6 ft 0 in (1.83 m)	180 lb (82 kg)	1965–01–20	Notre Dame
PG	25	Doc Rivers	6 ft 4 in (1.93 m)	185 lb (84 kg)	1961–10–13	Marquette
PF	54	Charles D. Smith	6 ft 10 in (2.08 m)	230 lb (104 kg)	1965–07–16	Pittsburgh
SF	35	Loy Vaught	6 ft 9 in (2.06 m)	230 lb (104 kg)	1968–02–27	Michigan
SG	21	Danny Young	6 ft 4 in (1.93 m)	175 lb (79 kg)	1962–07–26	Wake Forest

Coaches
Head coach
- Larry Brown
Assistant(s)
- Mack Calvin
- John Hammond

Legend
- (DP) Unsigned draft pick
- (FA) Free agent
- (S) Suspended
- Injured

=== Roster notes ===
- Forward Tony Brown became the 5th former Laker to play with the crosstown rival Clippers. He would later serve as an assistant coach for the team under coaches Mike Dunleavy, Sr. and Kim Hughes from 2008 to 2010
- This is point guard David Rivers's second tour of duty with the franchise. He previously played for the team in 1989–1990.

== Regular season ==
=== Season standings ===
Pacific Division	W	L	PCT	GB	Home	Road	Div
y-Portland Trail Blazers	57	25	.695	—	33–8	24–17	21–9
x-Golden State Warriors	55	27	.671	2	31–10	24–17	19–11
x-Phoenix Suns	53	29	.646	4	36–5	17–24	17–13
x-Seattle SuperSonics	47	35	.573	10	28–13	19–22	16–14
x-Los Angeles Clippers	45	37	.549	12	29–12	16–25	13–17
x-Los Angeles Lakers	43	39	.524	14	24–17	19–22	13–17
Sacramento Kings	29	53	.354	28	21–20	8–33	6–24

y – clinched division title
x – clinched playoff spot

#	Western Conference				
#	Team	W	L	PCT	GB
1	c-Portland Trail Blazers	57	25	.695	–
2	y-Utah Jazz	55	27	.671	2
3	x-Golden State Warriors	55	27	.671	2
4	x-Phoenix Suns	53	29	.646	4
5	x-San Antonio Spurs	47	35	.573	10
6	x-Seattle SuperSonics	47	35	.573	10
7	x-Los Angeles Clippers	45	37	.549	12
8	x-Los Angeles Lakers	43	39	.524	14
9	Houston Rockets	42	40	.512	15
10	Sacramento Kings	29	53	.354	28
11	Denver Nuggets	24	58	.293	33
12	Dallas Mavericks	22	60	.268	35
13	Minnesota Timberwolves	15	67	.183	42

z – clinched division title
y – clinched division title
x – clinched playoff spot

== Playoffs ==
1992 playoff game log
First round: 2–3 (home: 2–0; road: 0–3)

Game	Date	Team	Score	High points	High rebounds	High assists	Location Attendance	Series
1	April 24	@ Utah	L 97–115	Doc Rivers (23)	Charles Smith (9)	Doc Rivers (5)	Delta Center; 19,911	0–1
2	April 26	@ Utah	L 92–103	Danny Manning (22)	Ken Norman (14)	Doc Rivers (6)	Delta Center; 19,911	0–2
3	April 28	Utah	W 98–88	Danny Manning (17)	Ron Harper (12)	three players tied (5)	Los Angeles Memorial Sports Arena; 14,086	1–2
4	May 3	Utah	W 115–107	Danny Manning (33)	Danny Manning (10)	Norman, Grant (6)	Anaheim Convention Center; 7,148	2–2
5	May 4	@ Utah	L 89–98	Danny Manning (24)	Ken Norman (10)	Ron Harper (7)	Delta Center; 19,911	2–3

1992 schedule

== Player statistics ==
Legend
GP	Games played	GS	Games started	MPG	Minutes per game
FG%	Field-goal percentage	3P%	3-point field-goal percentage	FT%	Free-throw percentage
RPG	Rebounds per game	APG	Assists per game	SPG	Steals per game
BPG	Blocks per game	PPG	Points per game

=== Season ===
Player	GP	GS	MPG	FG%	3P%	FT%	RPG	APG	SPG	BPG	PPG
Tony Brown	22	0	11.5	.438	.318	.621	1.3	.7	.5	.0	4.7
Lanard Copeland	10	0	4.8	.304	.000	1.000	.7	.5	.2	.0	1.6
James Edwards	72	11	20.0	.465	.000	.731	2.8	.7	.3	.5	9.7
LeRon Ellis	29	0	3.6	.340	—	.474	.8	.0	.2	.3	1.5
Gary Grant	78	53	26.3	.462	.294	.815	2.4	6.9	1.8	.2	7.8
Ron Harper	82	82	38.3	.440	.303	.736	5.5	5.1	1.9	.9	18.2
Bo Kimble	34	0	8.1	.396	.308	.645	.9	.5	.3	.2	3.3
Danny Manning	82	82	35.4	.542	.000	.725	6.9	3.5	1.6	1.5	19.3
Tharon Mayes	3	0	13.3	.400	.500	.667	.3	1.0	.7	.3	3.0
Ken Norman	77	24	26.1	.490	.143	.535	5.8	1.6	.7	.9	12.1
Elliot Perry	10	0	6.6	.400	.000	.500	.7	1.4	.9	.1	1.3
Olden Polynice	76	65	24.1	.519	.000	.622	7.1	.6	.6	.3	8.1
David Rivers	15	0	8.1	.333	.000	.909	1.3	1.4	.5	.1	2.0
Doc Rivers	59	25	28.1	.424	.283	.832	2.5	3.9	1.9	.3	10.9
Charles Smith	49	25	26.7	.466	.000	.785	6.1	1.1	.8	2.0	14.6
Loy Vaught	79	38	21.4	.492	.800	.797	6.5	.9	.5	.4	7.6
Danny Young	44	5	20.2	.391	.333	.887	1.5	3.5	.9	.1	5.3

=== Playoffs ===
Player	GP	GS	MPG	FG%	3P%	FT%	RPG	APG	SPG	BPG	PPG
James Edwards	5	0	17.4	.417	—	.632	2.6	.6	.2	.2	6.4
LeRon Ellis	1	0	2.0	—	—	—	.0	.0	.0	.0	.0
Gary Grant	5	1	15.4	.476	.000	1.000	.8	3.6	.6	.4	4.4
Ron Harper	5	5	41.2	.448	.111	.786	6.4	4.6	1.0	.8	18.0
Bo Kimble	3	0	1.7	.000	—	—	.0	.3	.0	.0	.0
Danny Manning	5	5	38.8	.568	.333	.645	5.6	2.8	1.0	.8	22.6
Ken Norman	5	5	36.8	.509	.000	.529	9.8	3.0	.8	.6	12.6
Olden Polynice	5	0	12.6	.583	—	.333	3.4	.6	.2	.2	3.2
Doc Rivers	5	4	37.4	.446	.500	.815	3.8	4.2	1.2	.0	15.2
Charles Smith	5	5	29.6	.393	—	.933	5.6	1.8	.8	2.4	11.6
Loy Vaught	5	0	7.2	.636	1.000	1.000	2.4	.8	.2	.2	3.4
Danny Young	3	0	3.7	.500	.000	—	.0	.3	.0	.0	1.3

Player statistics citation:

== Transactions ==
The Clippers were involved in the following transactions during the 1991–92 season.

=== Trades ===
June 26, 1991
To Los Angeles Clippers

- Doc Rivers
To Atlanta Hawks

- 1991 first-round draft pick & 1993 and 1994 second-round draft picks
June 26, 1991
To Los Angeles Clippers

- 1996 or 1997 second-round draft pick
To Denver Nuggets

- Winston Garland
September 22, 1991
To Los Angeles Clippers

- James Edwards
To Detroit Pistons

- Jeff Martin & 1995 second-round draft pick

Player Transactions Citation:
