= 1991–92 Phoenix Suns season =

NBA team season

- Head coach: Cotton Fitzsimmons
- General manager: Jerry Colangelo
- Owner: Jerry Colangelo
- Arena: Arizona Veterans Memorial Coliseum

Results
- Record: 53–29 (.646)
- Place: Division: 3rd (Pacific); Conference: 4th (Western)
- Playoff finish: Conference semifinals (lost to Trail Blazers 1–4)
- Stats at Basketball Reference

Local media
- Television: KUTP; ASPN
- Radio: KTAR

The 1991–92 Phoenix Suns season was the 24th season for the Phoenix Suns in the National Basketball Association.

== Season summary ==
=== Off-season ===
This was the Suns' final season in which they played their home games at the Arizona Veterans Memorial Coliseum. During the off-season, the team acquired three-point specialist Trent Tucker from the New York Knicks; however, Tucker never played for the Suns as he was released to free agency, and later on signed with the San Antonio Spurs.

=== Regular season ===
After a 3–2 start to the regular season, the Suns struggled posting a six-game losing streak, which led to a 3–8 start to the season. However, the team soon recovered by posting a nine-game winning streak between November and December, then later on posting a seven-game winning streak in January, and holding a 32–16 record at the All-Star break. The Suns posted a six-game winning streak between March and April, and finished in third place in the Pacific Division with a 53–29 record, which earned them the fourth seed in the Western Conference.

Jeff Hornacek averaged 20.1 points, 5.0 rebounds, 5.1 assists and 2.0 steals per game, while Kevin Johnson averaged 19.7 points, 10.7 assists and 1.5 steals per game, and was named to the All-NBA Third Team, and sixth man Dan Majerle provided the team with 17.3 points, 5.9 rebounds and 1.6 steals per game off the bench. In addition, Tom Chambers contributed 16.3 points and 5.8 rebounds per game, while Tim Perry showed improvement becoming the team's starting small forward averaging 12.3 points, 6.9 rebounds and 1.5 blocks per game, and Andrew Lang replaced Mark West as the team's starting center this season, averaging 7.7 points, 6.7 rebounds and leading the team with 2.5 blocks per game. Meanwhile, second-year forward Cedric Ceballos contributed 7.2 points per game, West averaged 6.1 points and 4.5 rebounds per game, and second-year guard Negele Knight provided with 5.8 points and 2.7 assists per game.

During the NBA All-Star weekend at the Orlando Arena in Orlando, Florida, Hornacek and Majerle were both selected for the 1992 NBA All-Star Game, as members of the Western Conference All-Star team; it was the first All-Star appearance for both players, and the only All-Star appearance for Hornacek. In addition, Hornacek also participated in the NBA Three-Point Shootout, and Ceballos won the NBA Slam Dunk Contest. Johnson finished in 15th place in Most Valuable Player voting, while Majerle finished in third place in Sixth Man of the Year voting, and Perry finished tied in sixth place in Most Improved Player voting.

The Suns finished 17th in the NBA in home-game attendance, with an attendance of 594,327 at the Arizona Veterans Memorial Coliseum during the regular season.

=== NBA playoffs ===
In the Western Conference First Round of the 1992 NBA playoffs, the Suns faced off against the 5th–seeded Spurs, who were led by Terry Cummings, Sean Elliott and Rod Strickland. The Spurs were without All-Star center, and Defensive Player of the Year, David Robinson, who was out due to a season-ending thumb injury. The Suns won the first two games over the Spurs at home at the Arizona Veterans Memorial Coliseum, before winning Game 3 on the road, 101–92 at the HemisFair Arena to win the series in a three-game sweep.

In the Western Conference Semi-finals, the team faced off against the top–seeded, and Pacific Division champion Portland Trail Blazers, a team that featured All-Star guard Clyde Drexler, All-Star guard Terry Porter, and Jerome Kersey. The Trail Blazers took a 2–0 series lead, but the Suns managed to win Game 3 at home, 124–117 at the Arizona Veterans Memorial Coliseum. After losing Game 4 at home in double-overtime, 153–151, the Suns lost Game 5 to the Trail Blazers on the road, 118–106 at the Memorial Coliseum, thus losing the series in five games.

The Trail Blazers would lose in six games to the defending NBA champion Chicago Bulls in the 1992 NBA Finals.

=== Aftermath ===
Following the season, Hornacek, Perry and Lang were all traded to the Philadelphia 76ers, after Hornacek spent six seasons with the Suns, and head coach Cotton Fitzsimmons resigned, ending his four-season second stint as coach of the Suns.

== Draft picks ==
Round	Pick	Player	Position	Nationality	College
2	32	Chad Gallagher	Center	United States	Creighton
2	46	Richard Dumas	Forward	United States	Oklahoma State
2	50	Joey Wright	Guard	United States	Texas

None of the three players that the Suns selected in the 1991 NBA draft would play with the Suns this season. Both Chad Gallagher and Joey Wright were cut from the team before the regular season began, while Richard Dumas showcased promising talents early on in training camp, but was suspended from the team for the entire season due to substance abuse violations. Dumas would, however, return to the Suns to play what became his proper rookie season the following season afterward.

== Roster ==
1991–92 Phoenix Suns roster
Players

Pos.	No.	Player	Height	Weight	DOB	From
PG	15	Steve Burtt	6 ft 2 in (1.88 m)	185 lb (84 kg)	1962–11–05	Iona
SF	23	Cedric Ceballos	6 ft 6 in (1.98 m)	190 lb (86 kg)	1969–08–02	Cal State Fullerton
PF	24	Tom Chambers	6 ft 10 in (2.08 m)	220 lb (100 kg)	1959–06–21	Utah
SF	21	Richard Dumas (S)	6 ft 7 in (2.01 m)	200 lb (91 kg)	1969–05–19	Oklahoma State
SG	14	Jeff Hornacek	6 ft 3 in (1.91 m)	190 lb (86 kg)	1963–05–03	Iowa State
PG	7	Kevin Johnson	6 ft 1 in (1.85 m)	180 lb (82 kg)	1966–03–04	California
PG	32	Negele Knight	6 ft 1 in (1.85 m)	175 lb (79 kg)	1967–03–06	Dayton
C	28	Andrew Lang	6 ft 11 in (2.11 m)	245 lb (111 kg)	1966–06–28	Arkansas
SF	9	Dan Majerle	6 ft 6 in (1.98 m)	215 lb (98 kg)	1965–09–09	Central Michigan
PF	0	Jerrod Mustaf	6 ft 10 in (2.08 m)	238 lb (108 kg)	1969–10–28	Maryland
SF	45	Ed Nealy	6 ft 7 in (2.01 m)	238 lb (108 kg)	1960–02–19	Kansas State
PF	34	Tim Perry	6 ft 9 in (2.06 m)	200 lb (91 kg)	1965–06–04	Temple
PF	31	Kurt Rambis	6 ft 8 in (2.03 m)	213 lb (97 kg)	1958–02–25	Santa Clara
C	41	Mark West	6 ft 10 in (2.08 m)	230 lb (104 kg)	1960–11–05	Old Dominion

Coaches
Head coach
- Cotton Fitzsimmons
Assistant(s)
- Lionel Hollins
- Scotty Robertson
- Paul Westphal

Legend
- (DP) Unsigned draft pick
- (FA) Free agent
- (S) Suspended
- Injured

Roster
Updated: April 23, 1992

=== Roster Notes ===
- Rookie small forward Richard Dumas was suspended for violating the NBA's substance abuse policy.

== Regular season ==
=== Season standings ===
Pacific Division	W	L	PCT	GB	Home	Road	Div
y-Portland Trail Blazers	57	25	.695	—	33–8	24–17	21–9
x-Golden State Warriors	55	27	.671	2	31–10	24–17	19–11
x-Phoenix Suns	53	29	.646	4	36–5	17–24	17–13
x-Seattle SuperSonics	47	35	.573	10	28–13	19–22	16–14
x-Los Angeles Clippers	45	37	.549	12	29–12	16–25	13–17
x-Los Angeles Lakers	43	39	.524	14	24–17	19–22	13–17
Sacramento Kings	29	53	.354	28	21–20	8–33	6–24

y – clinched division title
x – clinched playoff spot

#	Western Conference				
#	Team	W	L	PCT	GB
1	c-Portland Trail Blazers	57	25	.695	–
2	y-Utah Jazz	55	27	.671	2
3	x-Golden State Warriors	55	27	.671	2
4	x-Phoenix Suns	53	29	.646	4
5	x-San Antonio Spurs	47	35	.573	10
6	x-Seattle SuperSonics	47	35	.573	10
7	x-Los Angeles Clippers	45	37	.549	12
8	x-Los Angeles Lakers	43	39	.524	14
9	Houston Rockets	42	40	.512	15
10	Sacramento Kings	29	53	.354	28
11	Denver Nuggets	24	58	.293	33
12	Dallas Mavericks	22	60	.268	35
13	Minnesota Timberwolves	15	67	.183	42

z – clinched division title
y – clinched division title
x – clinched playoff spot

== Playoffs ==
=== Game log ===
1992 playoff game log
First Round: 3–0 (home: 2–0; road: 1–0)

Game	Date	Team	Score	High points	High rebounds	High assists	Location Attendance	Series
1	April 24	San Antonio	W 117–111	Dan Majerle (25)	Cedric Ceballos (9)	Kevin Johnson (17)	Arizona Veterans Memorial Coliseum; 14,496	1–0
2	April 26	San Antonio	W 119–107	Hornacek, Perry (31)	Lang, Perry (10)	Kevin Johnson (19)	Arizona Veterans Memorial Coliseum; 14,496	2–0
3	April 29	@ San Antonio	W 101–92	Hornacek, Johnson (22)	Tim Perry (9)	Kevin Johnson (11)	HemisFair Arena; 14,853	3–0

Conference semifinals: 1–4 (home: 1–1; road: 0–3)

Game	Date	Team	Score	High points	High rebounds	High assists	Location Attendance	Series
1	May 5	@ Portland	L 111–113	Kevin Johnson (24)	Chambers, Johnson (8)	Jeff Hornacek (12)	Memorial Coliseum; 12,888	0–1
2	May 7	@ Portland	L 119–126	Kevin Johnson (35)	Jeff Hornacek (11)	Dan Majerle (6)	Memorial Coliseum; 12,888	0–2
3	May 9	Portland	W 124–117	Jeff Hornacek (30)	Majerle, Perry (9)	Kevin Johnson (16)	Arizona Veterans Memorial Coliseum; 14,496	1–2
4	May 11	Portland	L 151–153 (2OT)	Kevin Johnson (35)	Dan Majerle (11)	Kevin Johnson (14)	Arizona Veterans Memorial Coliseum; 14,496	1–3
5	May 14	@ Portland	L 106–118	Chambers, Perry (19)	Tom Chambers (8)	Kevin Johnson (6)	Memorial Coliseum; 12,888	1–4

1992 schedule

== Awards and honors ==
=== Week/Month ===
- Jeff Hornacek was named Player of the Month for December.
- Cotton Fitzsimmons was named Coach of the Month for December.

=== All-Star ===
- Jeff Hornacek was selected as a reserve for the Western Conference in the All-Star Game. It was his first and only All-Star selection. Hornacek finished seventh in voting among Western Conference guards with 271,180 votes.
- Dan Majerle was selected as a reserve for the Western Conference in the All-Star Game. It was his first All-Star selection.
- Other Suns players receiving All-Star votes were Tom Chambers (406,185) and Kevin Johnson (309,820).
- Cedric Ceballos won the Slam Dunk Contest, winning the competition with the famous "Hocus Pocus" blindfolded dunk.
- Jeff Hornacek participated in the Three-Point Shootout, losing to champion and former Suns teammate Craig Hodges.

=== Season ===
- Kevin Johnson was named to the All-NBA Third Team. Johnson also finished 15th in MVP voting.
- Dan Majerle finished third in Sixth Man of the Year voting.

== Player statistics ==
Legend
GP	Games played	GS	Games started	MPG	Minutes per game
FG%	Field-goal percentage	3P%	3-point field-goal percentage	FT%	Free-throw percentage
RPG	Rebounds per game	APG	Assists per game	SPG	Steals per game
BPG	Blocks per game	PPG	Points per game

=== Season ===
Player	GP	GS	MPG	FG%	3P%	FT%	RPG	APG	SPG	BPG	PPG
Steve Burtt	31	2	11.5	.463	.167	.704	1.1	1.9	.5	.1	6.0
Cedric Ceballos	64	4	11.3	.482	.167	.736	2.4	0.8	.3	.2	7.2
Tom Chambers	69	66	28.2	.431	.367	.830	5.8	2.1	.8	.5	16.3
Jeff Hornacek	81	81	38.0	.512	.439	.886	5.0	5.1	2.0	.4	20.1
Kevin Johnson	78	78	37.2	.479	.217	.807	3.7	10.7	1.5	.3	19.7
Negele Knight	42	1	15.0	.475	.308	.688	1.1	2.7	.6	.1	5.8
Andrew Lang	81	71	24.3	.522	.000	.768	6.7	0.5	.6	2.5	7.7
Dan Majerle	82	15	34.8	.478	.382	.756	5.9	3.3	1.6	.5	17.3
Jerrod Mustaf	52	3	10.5	.477	.	.690	2.8	0.9	.4	.3	4.5
Ed Nealy	52	4	9.7	.512	.400	.667	2.1	0.7	.3	.0	3.1
Tim Perry	80	69	31.0	.523	.375	.712	6.9	1.7	.6	1.5	12.3
Kurt Rambis	28	5	13.6	.463	.	.778	3.8	1.3	.4	.5	3.2
Mark West	82	11	17.5	.632	.	.637	4.5	0.3	.2	1.0	6.1

=== Playoffs ===
Player	GP	GS	MPG	FG%	3P%	FT%	RPG	APG	SPG	BPG	PPG
Steve Burtt	8	0	13.0	.421	.000	.857	1.5	1.8	.6	.0	6.3
Cedric Ceballos	8	8	23.5	.550	.	.667	6.4	1.5	.8	.8	13.5
Tom Chambers	7	0	27.7	.459	.571^	.844	4.4	2.7	.3	.7	15.6
Jeff Hornacek	8	8	42.9	.484	.471^	.912	6.4	5.3	1.8	.3	20.4
Kevin Johnson	8	8	41.9	.484	.500^	.861	4.1	11.6	1.5	.3	23.6
Andrew Lang	8	8	24.0	.375	.	.789	4.0	0.3	.4	1.9	5.6
Dan Majerle	7	0	38.0	.432	.273	.962+	6.3	2.9	1.4	.0	18.6
Ed Nealy	8	0	8.4	.389	.385	1.000+	2.3	0.5	.4	.0	2.9
Tim Perry	8	8	23.1	.603†	.	.719	4.9	1.4	.4	.8	12.4
Mark West	8	0	12.0	.737†	.	.500	2.1	0.3	.3	.5	4.0

† – Minimum 20 field goals made.
^ – Minimum 5 three-pointers made.
+ – Minimum 10 free throws made.

Player statistics citation:

== Transactions ==
=== Trades ===
June 27, 1991	To Cleveland Cavaliers Rights to (Socialist Federal Republic of Yugoslavia) Miloš Babić	To Phoenix Suns Rights to (Italy) Stefano Rusconi
October 1, 1991	To New York Knicks (United States) Xavier McDaniel	To Phoenix Suns (United States) Jerrod Mustaf (United States) Trent Tucker 1992 second-round draft pick ( (United States) Brian Davis) 1994 second-round draft pick ( (United States) Anthony Goldwire)

=== Free agents ===
==== Additions ====
Date	Player	Contract	Old Team
February 14, 1992	Steve Burtt	Signed two 10-day contracts	Oklahoma City Cavalry (CBA)
March 5, 1992	Steve Burtt	Signed for rest of season	Phoenix Suns

==== Subtractions ====
Date	Player	Reason left	New team
August 6, 1991	Ian Lockhart	Free agent	Cholet Basket (France)
October 29, 1991	Joey Wright	Waived	Pensacola HotShots (GBA)
October 30, 1991	Joe Barry Carroll	Waived	—N/a (Retired)
November 15, 1991	Trent Tucker	Waived	San Antonio Spurs

Player Transactions Citation:

== See also ==
- 1991–92 NBA season
