= 1991–92 Houston Rockets season =

- Head coach: Don Chaney (fired); Rudy Tomjanovich
- General manager: Steve Patterson
- Owner: Charlie Thomas
- Arena: The Summit

Results
- Record: 42–40 (.512)
- Place: Division: 3rd (Midwest); Conference: 9th (Western)
- Playoff finish: Did not qualify
- Stats at Basketball Reference

Local media
- Television: KTXH; Home Sports Entertainment
- Radio: KTRH

The 1991–92 Houston Rockets season was the 25th season for the Houston Rockets in the National Basketball Association, and their 21st season in Houston, Texas.

== Season summary ==
=== Off-season ===
For the season, the Rockets slightly updated their primary logo, removing the white line between the left side of the golden yellow basketball and the red outline, and widening the white seams on the basketball. The logo would remain in use until 1995.

=== Regular season ===
The Rockets started the regular season by defeating the Los Angeles Lakers at home at The Summit in double-overtime, 126–121 on November 1, 1991. The Rockets got off to a fast start by winning nine of their first twelves games of the regular season, but then posted a five-game losing streak afterwards, and later on held a 25–22 record at the All-Star break. By February 17, 1992, the team hovered at .500 in winning percentage with a mediocre 26–26 record when head coach Don Chaney was fired, and replaced with assistant coach Rudy Tomjanovich.

Under Tomjanovich, the Rockets won 11 of their first 15 games, but then struggled losing 10 of their final 15 games of the season, which included a six-game losing streak in March; Hakeem Olajuwon missed twelve games due to a hamstring injury, which the Rockets' management accused him of faking because of a contract dispute, and suspended him. The Rockets lost their final three games to close the season, finishing in third place in the Midwest Division with a 42–40 record, and missing the NBA playoffs by just one game behind the 8th-seeded Lakers, who were without All-Star guard Magic Johnson, who had retired due to his HIV infection. It was the first time that the Rockets failed to qualify for the playoffs since the 1983–84 season.

Olajuwon averaged 21.6 points, 12.1 rebounds, 1.8 steals and 4.3 blocks per game, while Otis Thorpe averaged 17.3 points and 10.5 rebounds per game, and Vernon Maxwell provided the team with 17.2 points, 4.1 assists and 1.3 steals per game, and also led the league with 162 three-point field goals. In addition, Kenny Smith contributed 14.0 points, 6.9 assists and 1.3 steals per game, while sixth man Sleepy Floyd provided with 9.1 points and 2.9 assists per game off the bench, and Buck Johnson contributed 8.6 points per game. Meanwhile, second-year forward Matt Bullard contributed 6.4 points per game, rookie power forward Carl Herrera provided with 4.4 points per game, and defensive forward Larry Smith averaged 2.3 points and 5.7 rebounds per game.

During the NBA All-Star weekend at the Orlando Arena in Orlando, Florida, Olajuwon and Thorpe were both selected for the 1992 NBA All-Star Game, as members of the Western Conference All-Star team; it was Thorpe's first and only All-Star appearance. Olajuwon also finished tied in sixth place in Defensive Player of the Year voting. The Rockets finished 18th in the NBA in home-game attendance, with an attendance of 592,790 at The Summit during the regular season.

=== Aftermath ===
Following the season, Johnson signed as a free agent with the Washington Bullets, and Larry Smith signed with the San Antonio Spurs.

== Draft picks ==
Round	Pick	Player	Position	Nationality	School or club team
1	20	John Turner	PF	United States	Phillips
2	47	Keith Hughes	PF	United States	Rutgers
2	51	Žan Tabak	C	Croatia	KK Split (Croatia)

== Roster ==
1991–92 Houston Rockets roster
Players

Pos.	No.	Player	Height	Weight	DOB	From
PF	50	Matt Bullard	6 ft 10 in (2.08 m)	215 lb (98 kg)	1967–06–05	Iowa
SG	21	Sleepy Floyd	6 ft 3 in (1.91 m)	170 lb (77 kg)	1960–03–06	Georgetown
PF	7	Carl Herrera	6 ft 9 in (2.06 m)	215 lb (98 kg)	1966–12–14	Houston
SG	32	Dave Jamerson	6 ft 5 in (1.96 m)	190 lb (86 kg)	1967–08–13	Ohio
PG	6	Avery Johnson	5 ft 10 in (1.78 m)	175 lb (79 kg)	1965–03–25	Southern
SF	1	Buck Johnson	6 ft 7 in (2.01 m)	190 lb (86 kg)	1964–01–03	Alabama
SF	11	Vernon Maxwell	6 ft 4 in (1.93 m)	180 lb (82 kg)	1965–09–12	Florida
C	34	Hakeem Olajuwon	7 ft 0 in (2.13 m)	255 lb (116 kg)	1963–01–21	Houston
C	15	Tree Rollins	7 ft 1 in (2.16 m)	255 lb (116 kg)	1955–06–16	Clemson
PG	30	Kenny Smith	6 ft 3 in (1.91 m)	170 lb (77 kg)	1965–03–08	North Carolina
PF	13	Larry Smith	6 ft 8 in (2.03 m)	215 lb (98 kg)	1958–01–18	Alcorn State
PF	33	Otis Thorpe	6 ft 9 in (2.06 m)	225 lb (102 kg)	1962–08–05	Providence
PF	40	John Turner	6 ft 8 in (2.03 m)	245 lb (111 kg)	1967–11–30	Phillips

Coaches
Head coach
- Rudy Tomjanovich
Assistant(s)
- Carroll Dawson
- John Killilea
- Calvin Murphy

Legend
- (DP) Unsigned draft pick
- (FA) Free agent
- (S) Suspended
- Injured

Roster
Updated: January 30, 1992

== Regular season ==
=== Season standings ===
Midwest Division	W	L	PCT	GB	Home	Road	Div
y-Utah Jazz	55	27	.671	—	37–4	18–23	20–6
x-San Antonio Spurs	47	35	.573	8	31–10	16–25	18–8
Houston Rockets	42	40	.512	13	28–13	14–27	12–14
Denver Nuggets	24	58	.293	31	18–23	6–35	8–18
Dallas Mavericks	22	60	.268	33	15–26	7–34	11–15
Minnesota Timberwolves	15	67	.183	40	9–32	6–35	9–17

y – clinched division title
x – clinched playoff spot

#	Western Conference				
#	Team	W	L	PCT	GB
1	c-Portland Trail Blazers	57	25	.695	–
2	y-Utah Jazz	55	27	.671	2
3	x-Golden State Warriors	55	27	.671	2
4	x-Phoenix Suns	53	29	.646	4
5	x-San Antonio Spurs	47	35	.573	10
6	x-Seattle SuperSonics	47	35	.573	10
7	x-Los Angeles Clippers	45	37	.549	12
8	x-Los Angeles Lakers	43	39	.524	14
9	Houston Rockets	42	40	.512	15
10	Sacramento Kings	29	53	.354	28
11	Denver Nuggets	24	58	.293	33
12	Dallas Mavericks	22	60	.268	35
13	Minnesota Timberwolves	15	67	.183	42

z – clinched division title
y – clinched division title
x – clinched playoff spot

== Game log ==
=== Regular season ===
1991–92 game log
Total: 42–40 (Home: 28–13; Road: 14–27)
November: 9–4 (home: 7–0; road: 2–4)

Game	Date	Team	Score	High points	High rebounds	High assists	Location Attendance	Record
3	November 5	Portland	W 106–99				The Summit	2–1
4	November 7	Cleveland	W 105–86				The Summit	3–1
5	November 9	Phoenix	W 96–95				The Summit	4–1
9	November 19	New York	W 90–79				The Summit	7–2

December: 7–9 (home: 2–5; road: 5–4)

Game	Date	Team	Score	High points	High rebounds	High assists	Location Attendance	Record
17	December 7	Utah	L 91–96				The Summit	9–8
18	December 10	@ Portland	W 108–106				Memorial Coliseum	10–8
29	December 30	@ Cleveland	L 89–121				Richfield Coliseum	16–13

January: 8–6 (home: 6–2; road: 2–4)

Game	Date	Team	Score	High points	High rebounds	High assists	Location Attendance	Record
35	January 11	Seattle	W 119–115				The Summit	19–16
38	January 18	@ Utah	L 80–108				Delta Center	20–18
41	January 25	@ Chicago	L 100–114				Chicago Stadium	22–19
43	January 30	Chicago	W 105–102				The Summit	24–19

February: 6–8 (home: 5–1; road: 1–7)

Game	Date	Team	Score	High points	High rebounds	High assists	Location Attendance	Record
44	February 1	@ Phoenix	L 92–106				Arizona Veterans Memorial Coliseum	24–20
46	February 5	@ Boston	L 85–98				Boston Garden	25–21
47	February 6	@ New York	L 85–102				Madison Square Garden	25–22
48	February 11	@ Seattle	L 99–105				Seattle Center Coliseum	25–23
50	February 14	Boston	W 105–99				The Summit	26–24
54	February 21	@ Utah	L 97–124				Delta Center	27–27

March: 7–9 (home: 5–3; road: 2–6)

Game	Date	Team	Score	High points	High rebounds	High assists	Location Attendance	Record
59	March 3	@ Phoenix	L 107–112 (2OT)				Arizona Veterans Memorial Coliseum	31–28
66	March 15	Utah	W 106–97				The Summit	36–30
68	March 19	Seattle	L 91–112				The Summit	37–31
70	March 24	@ Seattle	L 106–128				Seattle Center Coliseum	37–33
72	March 28	@ Portland	L 95–115				Memorial Coliseum	37–35

April: 5–4 (home: 3–2; road: 2–2)

Game	Date	Team	Score	High points	High rebounds	High assists	Location Attendance	Record
79	April 14	Portland	W 108–96				The Summit	42–37
80	April 15	@ Utah	L 98–130				Delta Center	42–38
82	April 19	Phoenix	L 97–100				The Summit	42–40

1991–92 schedule

== Player statistics ==
Legend
GP	Games played	GS	Games started	MPG	Minutes per game
FG%	Field-goal percentage	3P%	3-point field-goal percentage	FT%	Free-throw percentage
RPG	Rebounds per game	APG	Assists per game	SPG	Steals per game
BPG	Blocks per game	PPG	Points per game

Player	GP	GS	MPG	FG%	3FG%	FT%	RPG	APG	SPG	BPG	PPG
Matt Bullard	80	7	16.0	.459	.386	.760	2.8	.9	.3	.3	6.4
Sleepy Floyd	82	3	20.3	.406	.301	.794	1.8	2.9	.7	.3	9.1
Dan Godfread	1	0	2.0				.0	.0	.0	.0	.0
Gerald Henderson^{†}	8	0	4.3	.364	.000	.667	.3	.6	.0	.0	1.5
Carl Herrera	43	7	13.2	.516	.000	.568	2.3	.6	.4	.6	4.4
Dave Jamerson	48	0	7.9	.414	.286	.926	.9	.7	.4	.0	4.0
Avery Johnson^{†}	49	1	15.8	.464	.300	.609	.9	3.4	.8	.1	5.1
Buck Johnson	80	69	27.5	.458	.111	.727	3.9	2.0	.9	.6	8.6
Vernon Maxwell	80	80	33.8	.413	.342	.772	3.0	4.1	1.3	.4	17.2
Hakeem Olajuwon	70	69	37.7	.502	.000	.766	12.1	2.2	1.8	4.3	21.6
Tree Rollins	59	5	11.8	.535		.867	2.9	.3	.2	1.1	2.0
Kenny Smith	81	80	33.8	.475	.394	.866	2.2	6.9	1.3	.1	14.0
Larry Smith	45	7	17.8	.543	.000	.364	5.7	.7	.5	.2	2.3
Otis Thorpe	82	82	37.3	.592	.000	.657	10.5	3.0	.6	.5	17.3
John Turner	42	0	8.2	.439		.525	1.9	.3	.1	.1	2.8
Kennard Winchester^{†}	4	0	4.3	.333			.0	.0	.0	.0	.5

Player statistics citation:

== See also ==
- 1991–92 NBA season
