= 1991–92 Sacramento Kings season =

NBA professional basketball team season

- Head coach: Dick Motta (fired); Rex Hughes (interim)
- Owners: Joseph Benvenuti; Gregg Lukenbill
- Arena: ARCO Arena

Results
- Record: 29–53 (.354)
- Place: Division: 7th (Pacific); Conference: 10th (Western)
- Playoff finish: Did not qualify
- Stats at Basketball Reference

Local media
- Television: KRBK-TV; SportsChannel Pacific
- Radio: KRAK

The 1991–92 Sacramento Kings season was the 43rd season for the Sacramento Kings in the National Basketball Association, and their seventh season in Sacramento, California.

== Season summary ==
=== Off-season ===
The Kings received the third overall pick in the 1991 NBA draft, and selected small forward Billy Owens out of Syracuse University; however, the team later on traded Owens to the Golden State Warriors in exchange for Mitch Richmond on the first day of the regular season, which began on November 1, 1991. During the off-season, the Kings acquired Spud Webb from the Atlanta Hawks, and traded Bob Hansen to the Chicago Bulls in exchange for Dennis Hopson after the first two games of the season.

=== Regular season ===
With the addition of Richmond, Webb and Hopson, the Kings continued to struggle losing nine of their first twelve games of the regular season. The team's road-game losing streak reached to 43 consecutive road losses before defeating the Orlando Magic, 95–93 at the Orlando Arena on November 23, 1991. After a 7–18 start to the season, head coach Dick Motta was fired and replaced with assistant coach Rex Hughes as an interim coach. Under Hughes, the Kings held a 16–31 record at the All-Star break, and later on posted a 10-game losing streak in March, but managed to win five of their final seven games of the season, finishing in last place in the Pacific Division with a 29–53 record. The team missed the NBA playoffs for the sixth consecutive year.

Richmond averaged 22.5 points and 5.1 assists per game, and led the Kings with 103 three-point field goals, while second-year star Lionel Simmons averaged 17.1 points, 8.1 rebounds, 4.3 assists, 1.7 steals and 1.7 blocks per game, and Wayman Tisdale provided the team with 16.6 points and 6.5 rebounds per game. In addition, Webb contributed 16.0 points, 7.1 assists and 1.6 steals per game, while Hopson contributed 10.7 points per game, second-year forward Anthony Bonner provided with 9.4 points and 6.1 rebounds per game, and second-year center Duane Causwell averaged 8.0 points, 7.3 rebounds and 2.7 blocks per game.

During the NBA All-Star weekend at the Orlando Arena in Orlando, Florida, Richmond and Jim Les both participated in the NBA Three-Point Shootout. The Kings finished eighth in the NBA in home-game attendance, with an attendance of 697,574 at the ARCO Arena II during the regular season.

=== Aftermath ===
Following the season, Hopson retired after only five seasons in the NBA.

== Draft picks ==
Round	Pick	Player	Position	Nationality	College
1	3	Billy Owens	SF	United States	Syracuse
1	27	Pete Chilcutt	PF	United States	North Carolina
2	31	Randy Brown	PG	United States	New Mexico State
2	42	Steve Hood	SF	United States	James Madison

== Roster ==
1991–92 Sacramento Kings roster
Players

Pos.	No.	Player	Height	Weight	DOB	From
PF	24	Anthony Bonner	6 ft 8 in (2.03 m)	215 lb (98 kg)	1968–06–08	Saint Louis
PG	3	Randy Brown	6 ft 2 in (1.88 m)	190 lb (86 kg)	1968–05–22	New Mexico State
C	31	Duane Causwell	7 ft 0 in (2.13 m)	240 lb (109 kg)	1968–05–31	Temple
PF	32	Pete Chilcutt	6 ft 10 in (2.08 m)	230 lb (104 kg)	1968–09–14	North Carolina
SG	20	Dennis Hopson	6 ft 5 in (1.96 m)	200 lb (91 kg)	1965–04–22	Ohio State
C	51	Les Jepsen	7 ft 0 in (2.13 m)	237 lb (108 kg)	1967–06–24	Iowa
PG	33	Jim Les	5 ft 11 in (1.80 m)	165 lb (75 kg)	1963–08–18	Bradley
SG	2	Mitch Richmond	6 ft 5 in (1.96 m)	215 lb (98 kg)	1965–06–30	Kansas State
C	45	Steve Scheffler	6 ft 9 in (2.06 m)	250 lb (113 kg)	1967–09–03	Purdue
C	42	Dwayne Schintzius	7 ft 1 in (2.16 m)	260 lb (118 kg)	1968–10–14	Florida
SF	22	Lionel Simmons	6 ft 7 in (2.01 m)	210 lb (95 kg)	1968–11–14	La Salle
SG	5	Stephen Thompson	6 ft 4 in (1.93 m)	185 lb (84 kg)	1968–12–02	Syracuse
PF	23	Wayman Tisdale	6 ft 9 in (2.06 m)	240 lb (109 kg)	1964–06–09	Oklahoma
PG	4	Spud Webb	5 ft 6 in (1.68 m)	133 lb (60 kg)	1963–07–13	NC State

Coaches
Head coach
- Rex Hughes
Assistant(s)
- Bill Berry
- Mike Bratz

Legend
- (DP) Unsigned draft pick
- (FA) Free agent
- (S) Suspended
- Injured

== Regular season ==
=== Season standings ===
Pacific Division	W	L	PCT	GB	Home	Road	Div
y-Portland Trail Blazers	57	25	.695	—	33–8	24–17	21–9
x-Golden State Warriors	55	27	.671	2	31–10	24–17	19–11
x-Phoenix Suns	53	29	.646	4	36–5	17–24	17–13
x-Seattle SuperSonics	47	35	.573	10	28–13	19–22	16–14
x-Los Angeles Clippers	45	37	.549	12	29–12	16–25	13–17
x-Los Angeles Lakers	43	39	.524	14	24–17	19–22	13–17
Sacramento Kings	29	53	.354	28	21–20	8–33	6–24

y - clinched division title
x - clinched playoff spot

#	Western Conference				
#	Team	W	L	PCT	GB
1	c-Portland Trail Blazers	57	25	.695	–
2	y-Utah Jazz	55	27	.671	2
3	x-Golden State Warriors	55	27	.671	2
4	x-Phoenix Suns	53	29	.646	4
5	x-San Antonio Spurs	47	35	.573	10
6	x-Seattle SuperSonics	47	35	.573	10
7	x-Los Angeles Clippers	45	37	.549	12
8	x-Los Angeles Lakers	43	39	.524	14
9	Houston Rockets	42	40	.512	15
10	Sacramento Kings	29	53	.354	28
11	Denver Nuggets	24	58	.293	33
12	Dallas Mavericks	22	60	.268	35
13	Minnesota Timberwolves	15	67	.183	42

z - clinched division title
y - clinched division title
x - clinched playoff spot

== Player statistics ==
Legend
GP	Games played	GS	Games started	MPG	Minutes per game
FG%	Field-goal percentage	3P%	3-point field-goal percentage	FT%	Free-throw percentage
RPG	Rebounds per game	APG	Assists per game	SPG	Steals per game
BPG	Blocks per game	PPG	Points per game

=== Regular season ===
Player	GP	GS	MPG	FG%	3P%	FT%	RPG	APG	SPG	BPG	PPG
Mitch Richmond	80	80	38.7	.468	.384	.813	4.0	5.1	1.2	.4	22.5
Duane Causwell	80	77	28.6	.549	.000	.613	7.3	.7	.6	2.7	8.0
Anthony Bonner	79	18	28.9	.447	.250	.627	6.1	1.6	1.2	.3	9.4
Lionel Simmons	78	78	37.1	.454	.200	.770	8.1	4.3	1.7	1.7	17.1
Spud Webb	77	77	35.4	.445	.367	.859	2.9	7.1	1.6	.3	16.0
Wayman Tisdale	72	71	35.0	.500	.000	.763	6.5	1.5	.8	1.1	16.6
Pete Chilcutt	69	2	11.8	.452	1.000	.821	2.7	.6	.5	.2	3.6
Dennis Hopson^{†}	69	0	18.9	.465	.255	.708	3.0	1.5	1.0	.6	10.7
Jim Les	62	5	11.5	.385	.344	.809	1.0	2.3	.5	.0	3.7
Randy Brown	56	0	9.6	.456	.000	.655	1.2	1.1	.6	.2	3.4
Dwayne Schintzius	33	0	12.1	.427	.000	.833	3.6	.6	.2	.8	3.3
Les Jepsen	31	0	2.8	.375	.000	.636	1.0	.0	.0	.2	.8
Stephen Thompson^{†}	18	0	4.2	.382	.000	.375	1.0	.4	.3	.2	1.6
Steve Scheffler^{†}	4	0	3.8	1.000		.833	.8	.0	.0	.3	2.3
Bob Hansen^{†}	2	2	20.0	.444	.000		2.0	.5	.5	.0	4.0
Carl Thomas	1	0	31.0	.417	.500	.500	.0	1.0	1.0	.0	12.0

- ^{†} Denotes player spent time with another team in the season. Stats reflect time with the Kings only.

Player statistics citation:
