= 1991–92 San Antonio Spurs season =

- Head coach: Larry Brown (fired); Bob Bass (interim)
- General manager: Bob Bass
- Owner: Red McCombs
- Arena: HemisFair Arena

Results
- Record: 47–35 (.573)
- Place: Division: 2nd (Midwest); Conference: 5th (Western)
- Playoff finish: First round (lost to Suns 0–3)
- Stats at Basketball Reference

Local media
- Television: KSAT-TV; KABB; Home Sports Entertainment
- Radio: WOAI

The 1991–92 San Antonio Spurs season was the 16th season for the San Antonio Spurs in the National Basketball Association, and their 25th season as a franchise.

== Season summary ==
=== Off-season ===
During the off-season, the Spurs acquired Antoine Carr from the Sacramento Kings, and then signed free agent Vinnie Johnson in December.

=== Regular season ===
With the addition of Carr, the Spurs won seven of their first eight games of the regular season, and held a 10–3 record at the end of November. However, the team struggled with mediocrity holding a 21–17 record as of January 19, 1992, as head coach Larry Brown was fired, and soon took a coaching job with the Los Angeles Clippers; Brown was replaced with General Manager Bob Bass as an interim coach. At mid-season, the team signed three-point specialist Trent Tucker. Under Bass, the Spurs held a 27–19 record at the All-Star break, and finished in second place in the Midwest Division with a 47–35 record, earning the fifth seed in the Western Conference.

David Robinson averaged 23.2 points, 12.2 rebounds, 2.3 steals and 4.5 blocks per game, and was named the NBA Defensive Player of the Year, and was also named to the All-NBA First Team, and to the NBA All-Defensive First Team. In addition, Terry Cummings averaged 17.3 points and 9.0 rebounds per game, while Sean Elliott provided the team with 16.3 points and 5.4 rebounds per game, Rod Strickland provided with 13.8 points, 8.6 assists and 2.1 steals per game, and Willie Anderson contributed 13.1 points and 5.3 rebounds and assists per game each. Off the bench, Carr averaged 10.9 points and 4.3 rebounds per game, while Johnson contributed 8.0 points per game, Tucker provided with 6.5 points per game, but only played just 25 games, Sidney Green averaged 4.6 points and 4.3 rebounds per game, and Donald Royal contributed 4.2 points per game.

During the NBA All-Star weekend at the Orlando Arena in Orlando, Florida, Robinson was selected for the 1992 NBA All-Star Game, as a member of the Western Conference All-Star team; he also finished in third place in Most Valuable Player voting, behind Michael Jordan of the Chicago Bulls, and Clyde Drexler of the Portland Trail Blazers. The Spurs finished tenth in the NBA in home-game attendance, with an attendance of 658,337 at the HemisFair Arena during the regular season.

=== NBA playoffs ===
In the Western Conference First Round of the 1992 NBA playoffs, the Spurs faced off against the 4th–seeded Phoenix Suns, who were led by the All-Star trio of Kevin Johnson, Jeff Hornacek, and sixth man Dan Majerle. However, late during the regular season, Robinson suffered a season-ending thumb injury in March, and would not be available for the team's first-round series against the Suns. Without their star center, the Spurs lost the first two games to the Suns on the road at the Arizona Veterans Memorial Coliseum, before losing Game 3 at home, 101–92 at the HemisFair Arena, thus losing the series in a three-game sweep.

=== Aftermath ===
Following the season, Strickland signed as a free agent with the Portland Trail Blazers, while Bass was fired as head coach, Tucker signed with the Chicago Bulls, and Johnson retired.

== Draft picks ==
Round	Pick	Player	Position	Nationality	College
2	49	Greg Sutton	PG	United States	Oral Roberts

== Roster ==
1991–92 San Antonio Spurs roster
Players

Pos.	No.	Player	Height	Weight	DOB	From
SG	40	Willie Anderson	6 ft 7 in (2.01 m)	190 lb (86 kg)	1967–01–08	Georgia
PF	35	Antoine Carr	6 ft 9 in (2.06 m)	225 lb (102 kg)	1961–07–23	Wichita State
C	30	Tom Copa	6 ft 10 in (2.08 m)	275 lb (125 kg)	1964–10–30	Marquette
PF	34	Terry Cummings	6 ft 9 in (2.06 m)	220 lb (100 kg)	1961–03–15	DePaul
SF	32	Sean Elliott	6 ft 8 in (2.03 m)	205 lb (93 kg)	1968–02–02	Arizona
PF	21	Sidney Green	6 ft 9 in (2.06 m)	220 lb (100 kg)	1961–01–04	UNLV
PG	15	Vinnie Johnson	6 ft 2 in (1.88 m)	200 lb (91 kg)	1956–09–01	Baylor
SF	8	Paul Pressey	6 ft 5 in (1.96 m)	185 lb (84 kg)	1958–12–24	Tulsa
C	50	David Robinson (injured)	7 ft 1 in (2.16 m)	235 lb (107 kg)	1965–08–06	Navy
SF	5	Donald Royal	6 ft 8 in (2.03 m)	210 lb (95 kg)	1966–05–22	Notre Dame
PG	1	Rod Strickland	6 ft 3 in (1.91 m)	175 lb (79 kg)	1966–07–11	DePaul
PG	23	Greg Sutton	6 ft 2 in (1.88 m)	170 lb (77 kg)	1967–12–03	Oral Roberts
SG	6	Trent Tucker	6 ft 5 in (1.96 m)	193 lb (88 kg)	1959–12–20	Minnesota

Coaches
Head coach
- Bob Bass
Assistant(s)
- R. C. Buford
- Gregg Popovich

Legend
- (DP) Unsigned draft pick
- (FA) Free agent
- (S) Suspended
- Injured

== Regular season ==
=== Season standings ===
Midwest Division	W	L	PCT	GB	Home	Road	Div
y-Utah Jazz	55	27	.671	—	37–4	18–23	20–6
x-San Antonio Spurs	47	35	.573	8	31–10	16–25	18–8
Houston Rockets	42	40	.512	13	28–13	14–27	12–14
Denver Nuggets	24	58	.293	31	18–23	6–35	8–18
Dallas Mavericks	22	60	.268	33	15–26	7–34	11–15
Minnesota Timberwolves	15	67	.183	40	9–32	6–35	9–17

y - clinched division title
x - clinched playoff spot

#	Western Conference				
#	Team	W	L	PCT	GB
1	c-Portland Trail Blazers	57	25	.695	–
2	y-Utah Jazz	55	27	.671	2
3	x-Golden State Warriors	55	27	.671	2
4	x-Phoenix Suns	53	29	.646	4
5	x-San Antonio Spurs	47	35	.573	10
6	x-Seattle SuperSonics	47	35	.573	10
7	x-Los Angeles Clippers	45	37	.549	12
8	x-Los Angeles Lakers	43	39	.524	14
9	Houston Rockets	42	40	.512	15
10	Sacramento Kings	29	53	.354	28
11	Denver Nuggets	24	58	.293	33
12	Dallas Mavericks	22	60	.268	35
13	Minnesota Timberwolves	15	67	.183	42

z - clinched division title
y - clinched division title
x - clinched playoff spot

== Playoffs ==
1992 playoff game log
First Round: 0–3 (home: 0–1; road: 0–2)

Game	Date	Team	Score	High points	High rebounds	High assists	Location Attendance	Series
1	April 24	@ Phoenix	L 111–117	Terry Cummings (30)	Terry Cummings (12)	Rod Strickland (9)	Arizona Veterans Memorial Coliseum; 14,496	0–1
2	April 26	@ Phoenix	L 107–119	Terry Cummings (31)	Terry Cummings (10)	Rod Strickland (10)	Arizona Veterans Memorial Coliseum; 14,496	0–2
3	April 29	Phoenix	L 92–101	Antoine Carr (20)	Cummings, Carr (12)	three players tied (5)	HemisFair Arena; 14,853	0–3

1992 schedule

== Player statistics ==
=== Ragular season ===
Player	POS	GP	GS	MP	REB	AST	STL	BLK	PTS	MPG	RPG	APG	SPG	BPG	PPG
Sean Elliott	SF	82	82	3,120	439	214	84	29	1,338	38.0	5.4	2.6	1.0	.4	16.3
Antoine Carr	PF	81	27	1,867	346	63	32	96	881	23.0	4.3	.8	.4	1.2	10.9
Sidney Green	PF	80	1	1,127	342	36	29	11	367	14.1	4.3	.5	.4	.1	4.6
Terry Cummings	PF	70	67	2,149	631	102	58	34	1,210	30.7	9.0	1.5	.8	.5	17.3
David Robinson	C	68	68	2,564	829	181	158	305	1,578	37.7	12.2	2.7	2.3	4.5	23.2
Greg Sutton	PG	67	2	601	47	91	26	9	246	9.0	.7	1.4	.4	.1	3.7
Vinnie Johnson	SG	60	23	1,350	182	145	41	14	478	22.5	3.0	2.4	.7	.2	8.0
Donald Royal	SF	60	4	718	124	34	25	7	252	12.0	2.1	.6	.4	.1	4.2
Willie Anderson	SG	57	55	1,889	300	302	54	51	744	33.1	5.3	5.3	.9	.9	13.1
Rod Strickland	PG	57	54	2,053	265	491	118	17	787	36.0	4.6	8.6	2.1	.3	13.8
Paul Pressey	SG	56	7	759	95	142	29	19	151	13.6	1.7	2.5	.5	.3	2.7
Tom Copa	C	33	1	132	36	3	2	6	48	4.0	1.1	.1	.1	.2	1.5
Trent Tucker	SG	24	0	415	37	27	21	3	155	17.3	1.5	1.1	.9	.1	6.5
Avery Johnson^{†}	PG	20	14	463	35	100	21	3	135	23.2	1.8	5.0	1.1	.2	6.8
Tom Garrick^{†}	SG	19	5	374	41	63	21	1	98	19.7	2.2	3.3	1.1	.1	5.2
Jud Buechler^{†}	SF	11	0	140	22	11	8	3	33	12.7	2.0	1.0	.7	.3	3.0
Sean Higgins^{†}	SF	6	0	36	8	4	2	0	15	6.0	1.3	.7	.3	.0	2.5
Morlon Wiley^{†}	PG	3	0	13	1	1	0	0	6	4.3	.3	.3	.0	.0	2.0
Tony Massenburg^{†}	PF	1	0	9	0	0	0	0	2	9.0	.0	.0	.0	.0	2.0
Stephen Bardo	SG	1	0	1	1	0	0	0	0	1.0	1.0	.0	.0	.0	.0

- ^{†} Denotes player spent time with another team in the season. Stats reflect time with the Spurs only.

=== Playoffs ===
Player	POS	GP	GS	MP	REB	AST	STL	BLK	PTS	MPG	RPG	APG	SPG	BPG	PPG
Sean Elliott	SF	3	3	137	13	8	3	4	59	45.7	4.3	2.7	1.0	1.3	19.7
Terry Cummings	PF	3	3	122	34	7	4	4	78	40.7	11.3	2.3	1.3	1.3	26.0
Antoine Carr	PF	3	3	109	23	3	2	11	59	36.3	7.7	1.0	.7	3.7	19.7
Donald Royal	SF	3	2	57	12	0	2	2	15	19.0	4.0	.0	.7	.7	5.0
Paul Pressey	SG	3	2	46	3	3	3	1	13	15.3	1.0	1.0	1.0	.3	4.3
Vinnie Johnson	SG	3	0	69	8	7	5	1	25	23.0	2.7	2.3	1.7	.3	8.3
Sidney Green	PF	3	0	47	11	2	0	0	9	15.7	3.7	.7	.0	.0	3.0
Trent Tucker	SG	3	0	38	3	2	0	0	14	12.7	1.0	.7	.0	.0	4.7
Rod Strickland	PG	2	2	80	7	19	3	2	31	40.0	3.5	9.5	1.5	1.0	15.5
Greg Sutton	PG	2	0	15	0	2	1	1	7	7.5	.0	1.0	.5	.5	3.5

== Awards and records ==
- David Robinson, NBA All-Star
- David Robinson, NBA Defensive Player of the Year Award
- David Robinson, All-NBA First Team
- David Robinson, NBA All-Defensive First Team

== See also ==
- 1991-92 NBA season
