= 1991–92 Minnesota Timberwolves season =

NBA professional basketball team season

- Head coach: Jimmy Rodgers
- Arena: Target Center

Results
- Record: 15–67 (.183)
- Place: Division: 6th (Midwest); Conference: 13th (Western)
- Playoff finish: Did not qualify
- Stats at Basketball Reference

Local media
- Television: KSTP-TV/KITN-TV (Kevin Harlan, Quinn Buckner, Chet Coppock, Tom Hanneman); Prime Sports Upper Midwest (Jerry Schemmel, Greg Kelser, Robb Leer)
- Radio: KFAN (Kevin Harlan, Chad Hartman)

The 1991–92 Minnesota Timberwolves season was the third season for the Minnesota Timberwolves in the National Basketball Association.

== Season summary ==
=== Off-season ===
The Timberwolves received the seventh overall pick in the 1991 NBA draft, and selected Australian center Luc Longley from the University of New Mexico. During the off-season, the team hired Jimmy Rodgers as their new head coach.

=== Regular season ===
Under Rodgers and with the addition of Longley, the Timberwolves struggled losing nine of their first ten games of the regular season. In late November, the team traded Tyrone Corbin to the Utah Jazz in exchange for Thurl Bailey. Despite the addition of Bailey, the Timberwolves posted an eight-game losing streak between November and December, then posted an 11-game losing streak between January and February, and later on held an 8–38 record at the All-Star break. The team suffered a 16-game losing streak between February and March, and then posted a seven-game losing streak in April, finishing in last place in the Midwest Division with a league-worst 15–67 record, .183 in winning percentage, which remains the equal lowest winning percentage in the franchise's history, alongside the 2009–10 Timberwolves.

Tony Campbell averaged 16.8 points per game, while Pooh Richardson averaged 16.5 points, 8.4 assists and 1.5 steals per game, and Doug West showed improvement, providing the team with 14.0 points and 3.5 assists per game. In addition, Bailey provided with 11.7 points, 5.7 rebounds and 1.4 blocks per game, while Gerald Glass contributed 11.5 points per game, Sam Mitchell averaged 10.1 points and 5.8 rebounds per game, and second-year center Felton Spencer averaged 6.6 points, 7.1 rebounds and 1.3 blocks per game. Meanwhile, Randy Breuer provided with 5.4 points, 4.2 rebounds and 1.5 blocks per game, Scott Brooks contributed 5.1 points and 2.5 assists per game, and Longley averaged 4.3 points and 3.9 rebounds per game.

During the NBA All-Star weekend at the Orlando Arena in Orlando, Florida, West participated in the NBA Slam Dunk Contest. The Timberwolves finished fourth in the NBA in home-game attendance, with an attendance of 769,035 at the Target Center during the regular season.

=== Aftermath ===
Following the season, Campbell was traded to the New York Knicks, while Richardson and Mitchell were both traded to the Indiana Pacers, Brooks was dealt to the Houston Rockets, and Breuer was released to free agency.

== Draft picks ==
Round	Pick	Player	Position	Nationality	College
1	7	Luc Longley	C	Australia	New Mexico
2	34	Myron Brown	G	United States	Slippery Rock

== Roster ==
1991–92 Minnesota Timberwolves roster
Players

Pos.	No.	Player	Height	Weight	DOB	From
PF	41	Thurl Bailey	6 ft 11 in (2.11 m)	215 lb (98 kg)	––	NC State
C	45	Randy Breuer	7 ft 3 in (2.21 m)	230 lb (104 kg)	––	Minnesota
PG	1	Scott Brooks	5 ft 11 in (1.80 m)	165 lb (75 kg)	––	UC Irvine
SF	19	Tony Campbell	6 ft 7 in (2.01 m)	215 lb (98 kg)	––	Ohio State
SG	4	Gerald Glass	6 ft 5 in (1.96 m)	221 lb (100 kg)	––	Mississippi
C	13	Luc Longley	7 ft 2 in (2.18 m)	265 lb (120 kg)	––	New Mexico
PF	42	Sam Mitchell	6 ft 6 in (1.98 m)	210 lb (95 kg)	––	Mercer
PF	9	Tod Murphy	6 ft 9 in (2.06 m)	220 lb (100 kg)	––	UC Irvine
PF	52	Mark Randall	6 ft 8 in (2.03 m)	235 lb (107 kg)	––	Kansas
PG	24	Pooh Richardson	6 ft 1 in (1.85 m)	180 lb (82 kg)	––	UCLA
C	50	Felton Spencer	7 ft 0 in (2.13 m)	265 lb (120 kg)	––	Louisville
SG	5	Doug West	6 ft 6 in (1.98 m)	200 lb (91 kg)	––	Villanova

Coaches
Head coach
- Jimmy Rodgers
Assistant(s)
- Jim Brewer
- Sidney Lowe

Legend
- (DP) Unsigned draft pick
- (FA) Free agent
- (S) Suspended
- Injured

== Regular season ==
=== Season standings ===
Midwest Division	W	L	PCT	GB	Home	Road	Div
y-Utah Jazz	55	27	.671	—	37–4	18–23	20–6
x-San Antonio Spurs	47	35	.573	8	31–10	16–25	18–8
Houston Rockets	42	40	.512	13	28–13	14–27	12–14
Denver Nuggets	24	58	.293	31	18–23	6–35	8–18
Dallas Mavericks	22	60	.268	33	15–26	7–34	11–15
Minnesota Timberwolves	15	67	.183	40	9–32	6–35	9–17

y - clinched division title
x - clinched playoff spot

#	Western Conference				
#	Team	W	L	PCT	GB
1	c-Portland Trail Blazers	57	25	.695	–
2	y-Utah Jazz	55	27	.671	2
3	x-Golden State Warriors	55	27	.671	2
4	x-Phoenix Suns	53	29	.646	4
5	x-San Antonio Spurs	47	35	.573	10
6	x-Seattle SuperSonics	47	35	.573	10
7	x-Los Angeles Clippers	45	37	.549	12
8	x-Los Angeles Lakers	43	39	.524	14
9	Houston Rockets	42	40	.512	15
10	Sacramento Kings	29	53	.354	28
11	Denver Nuggets	24	58	.293	33
12	Dallas Mavericks	22	60	.268	35
13	Minnesota Timberwolves	15	67	.183	42

z - clinched division title
y - clinched division title
x - clinched playoff spot

== Player statistics ==
=== Ragular season ===
Player	POS	GP	GS	MP	REB	AST	STL	BLK	PTS	MPG	RPG	APG	SPG	BPG	PPG
Pooh Richardson	PG	82	82	2,922	301	685	119	25	1,350	35.6	3.7	8.4	1.5	.3	16.5
Sam Mitchell	PF	82	63	2,151	473	94	53	39	825	26.2	5.8	1.1	.6	.5	10.1
Scott Brooks	PG	82	0	1,082	99	205	66	7	417	13.2	1.2	2.5	.8	.1	5.1
Doug West	SG	80	72	2,540	257	281	66	26	1,116	31.8	3.2	3.5	.8	.3	14.0
Tony Campbell	SF	78	41	2,441	286	229	84	31	1,307	31.3	3.7	2.9	1.1	.4	16.8
Gerald Glass	SF	75	41	1,822	260	175	66	30	859	24.3	3.5	2.3	.9	.4	11.5
Thurl Bailey^{†}	PF	71	18	1,777	407	59	30	102	829	25.0	5.7	.8	.4	1.4	11.7
Randy Breuer	C	67	25	1,176	281	89	27	99	363	17.6	4.2	1.3	.4	1.5	5.4
Luc Longley	C	66	3	991	257	53	35	64	281	15.0	3.9	.8	.5	1.0	4.3
Felton Spencer	C	61	54	1,481	435	53	27	79	405	24.3	7.1	.9	.4	1.3	6.6
Tod Murphy	PF	47	3	429	110	11	9	8	98	9.1	2.3	.2	.2	.2	2.1
Mark Randall^{†}	PF	39	0	374	62	26	12	3	145	9.6	1.6	.7	.3	.1	3.7
Tom Garrick^{†}	SG	15	0	112	9	18	7	3	29	7.5	.6	1.2	.5	.2	1.9
Tyrone Corbin^{†}	SF	11	8	344	69	33	12	6	158	31.3	6.3	3.0	1.1	.5	14.4
Tellis Frank	PF	10	0	140	26	8	5	4	46	14.0	2.6	.8	.5	.4	4.6
Myron Brown	PG	4	0	23	3	6	1	0	9	5.8	.8	1.5	.3	.0	2.3

- ^{†} Denotes player spent time with another team in the season. Stats reflect time with the Timberwolves only.

== See also ==
- 1991-92 NBA season
