= 1991–92 Golden State Warriors season =

NBA professional basketball team season

- Head coach: Don Nelson
- Arena: Oakland–Alameda County Coliseum Arena

Results
- Record: 55–27 (.671)
- Place: Division: 2nd (Pacific); Conference: 3rd (Western)
- Playoff finish: West First Round (lost to SuperSonics 1–3)
- Stats at Basketball Reference

Local media
- Television: KPIX-TV; KICU-TV; SportsChannel Pacific
- Radio: KNBR

The 1991–92 Golden State Warriors season was the 46th season for the Golden State Warriors in the National Basketball Association, and their 29th season in the San Francisco Bay Area.

== Season summary ==
=== Off-season ===
The Warriors had the 16th overall pick in the 1991 NBA draft, and selected power forward Chris Gatling out of Old Dominion University; the team also selected center Victor Alexander out of Iowa State University with the 17th overall pick.

=== Regular season ===
On the first day of the regular season on November 1, 1991, the Run TMC trio was broken up when the Warriors traded star guard Mitch Richmond to the Sacramento Kings in exchange for rookie small forward, and first-round draft pick Billy Owens out of Syracuse University; Owens was drafted by the Kings as the third overall pick in the NBA draft. Owen's additional height at 6' 8" compared to Richmond's 6' 5" height was the size that head coach, and General Manager Don Nelson believed would complete the team; Nelson said he was "under pressure to get (the team) bigger" to improve the Warriors from a good team to a great one, and stated that he would "never make that trade again".

With the addition of Owens, the Warriors won nine of their first twelve games of the regular season, and later on held a 29–15 record at the All-Star break. The team won 11 of their 15 games in February, which included an eight-game winning streak, and won 11 of their final 15 games of the season. The Warriors finished in second place in the Pacific Division with a 55–27 record, which was the most wins in a season for the franchise since the 1975–76 season, and earned the third seed in the Western Conference. Nelson was named the NBA Coach of the Year, after leading the Warriors to an 11-game improvement over the previous season.

Chris Mullin averaged 25.6 points, 5.6 rebounds and 2.1 steals per game, and was named to the All-NBA First Team, while Tim Hardaway averaged 23.4 points, 10.0 assists and 2.0 steals per game, led the Warriors with 127 three-point field goals, and was named to the All-NBA Second Team, and sixth man Šarūnas Marčiulionis contributed 18.9 points and 1.6 steals per game off the bench. In addition, Owens provided the team with 14.3 points and 8.0 rebounds per game, and was named to the NBA All-Rookie First Team, while Rod Higgins contributed 10.2 points per game off the bench, but only played just 25 games due to a wrist injury, second-year forward Tyrone Hill averaged 8.2 points and 7.2 rebounds per game, second-year guard Mario Elie provided with 7.8 points per game, Alexander averaged 7.4 points and 4.2 rebounds per game, and Vincent Askew contributed 6.2 points per game.

During the NBA All-Star weekend at the Orlando Arena in Orlando, Florida, Mullin and Hardaway were both selected for the 1992 NBA All-Star Game, as members of the Western Conference All-Star team, while Nelson was selected to coach the Western Conference. Mullin also finished in sixth place in Most Valuable Player voting, with Hardaway finishing in eighth place, while Owens finished in third place in Rookie of the Year voting, and Marčiulionis finished in second place in Sixth Man of the Year voting, behind Detlef Schrempf of the Indiana Pacers, and also finished tied in eighth place in Most Improved Player voting.

The Warriors finished 14th in the NBA in home-game attendance, with an attendance of 616,025 at the Oakland-Alameda County Coliseum Arena during the regular season.

=== NBA playoffs ===
In the Western Conference First Round of the 1992 NBA playoffs, the Warriors faced off against the 6th–seeded Seattle SuperSonics, a team that featured All-Star guard Ricky Pierce, sixth man Eddie Johnson, and Shawn Kemp. The Warriors lost Game 1 to the SuperSonics at home, 117–109 at the Oakland-Alameda County Coliseum Arena, but managed to win Game 2 at home, 115–104 to even the series. However, the Warriors lost the next two games on the road, which included a Game 4 loss to the SuperSonics at the Seattle Center Coliseum, 119–116, thus losing the series in four games.

=== Aftermath ===
Following the season, Higgins signed as a free agent with the Sacramento Kings during the next season, and Elie signed with the Portland Trail Blazers.

== Draft picks ==
Round	Pick	Player	Position	Nationality	College
1	16	Chris Gatling	PF	United States	Old Dominion
1	17	Victor Alexander	C	United States	Iowa State
1	25	Shaun Vandiver	PF	United States	Colorado
2	43	Lamont Strothers	SG	United States	Christopher Newport

== Roster ==
1991–92 Golden State Warriors roster
Players

Pos.	No.	Player	Height	Weight	DOB	From
C	52	Victor Alexander	6 ft 9 in (2.06 m)	265 lb (120 kg)	1969–08–31	Iowa State
SG	4	Vincent Askew	6 ft 6 in (1.98 m)	210 lb (95 kg)	1966–02–28	Memphis
SF	35	Jud Buechler	6 ft 6 in (1.98 m)	220 lb (100 kg)	1968–06–19	Arizona
SG	20	Mario Elie	6 ft 5 in (1.96 m)	210 lb (95 kg)	1963–11–26	American International
PF	25	Chris Gatling	6 ft 10 in (2.08 m)	220 lb (100 kg)	1967–09–03	Old Dominion
PG	10	Tim Hardaway	6 ft 0 in (1.83 m)	175 lb (79 kg)	1966–09–01	UTEP
SF	22	Rod Higgins	6 ft 7 in (2.01 m)	200 lb (91 kg)	1960–01–31	Fresno State
PF	32	Tyrone Hill	6 ft 9 in (2.06 m)	240 lb (109 kg)	1968–03–19	Xavier
SF	11	Jaren Jackson	6 ft 4 in (1.93 m)	190 lb (86 kg)	1967–10–27	Georgetown
C	53	Alton Lister	7 ft 0 in (2.13 m)	240 lb (109 kg)	1958–10–01	Arizona State
SG	13	Šarūnas Marčiulionis	6 ft 5 in (1.96 m)	200 lb (91 kg)	1964–06–13	Lithuania
SF	17	Chris Mullin	6 ft 6 in (1.98 m)	200 lb (91 kg)	1963–07–30	St. John's
SF	30	Billy Owens	6 ft 8 in (2.03 m)	220 lb (100 kg)	1969–05–01	Syracuse
PF	43	Jim Petersen	6 ft 10 in (2.08 m)	235 lb (107 kg)	1962–02–22	Minnesota
SF	3	Tom Tolbert	6 ft 7 in (2.01 m)	235 lb (107 kg)	1965–10–16	Arizona

Coaches
Head coach
- Don Nelson
Assistant(s)
- Garry St. Jean
- Donnie Nelson

Legend
- (DP) Unsigned draft pick
- (FA) Free agent
- (S) Suspended
- Injured

Roster
Updated: March 9, 1992

== Regular season ==
=== Season standings ===
Pacific Division	W	L	PCT	GB	Home	Road	Div
y-Portland Trail Blazers	57	25	.695	—	33–8	24–17	21–9
x-Golden State Warriors	55	27	.671	2	31–10	24–17	19–11
x-Phoenix Suns	53	29	.646	4	36–5	17–24	17–13
x-Seattle SuperSonics	47	35	.573	10	28–13	19–22	16–14
x-Los Angeles Clippers	45	37	.549	12	29–12	16–25	13–17
x-Los Angeles Lakers	43	39	.524	14	24–17	19–22	13–17
Sacramento Kings	29	53	.354	28	21–20	8–33	6–24

y – clinched division title
x – clinched playoff spot

#	Western Conference				
#	Team	W	L	PCT	GB
1	c-Portland Trail Blazers	57	25	.695	–
2	y-Utah Jazz	55	27	.671	2
3	x-Golden State Warriors	55	27	.671	2
4	x-Phoenix Suns	53	29	.646	4
5	x-San Antonio Spurs	47	35	.573	10
6	x-Seattle SuperSonics	47	35	.573	10
7	x-Los Angeles Clippers	45	37	.549	12
8	x-Los Angeles Lakers	43	39	.524	14
9	Houston Rockets	42	40	.512	15
10	Sacramento Kings	29	53	.354	28
11	Denver Nuggets	24	58	.293	33
12	Dallas Mavericks	22	60	.268	35
13	Minnesota Timberwolves	15	67	.183	42

z – clinched division title
y – clinched division title
x – clinched playoff spot

== Playoffs ==
1992 playoff game log
First round: 1–3 (home: 1–1; road: 0–2)

Game	Date	Team	Score	High points	High rebounds	High assists	Location Attendance	Series
1	April 23	Seattle	L 109–117	Billy Owens (25)	Billy Owens (11)	Tim Hardaway (6)	Oakland–Alameda County Coliseum Arena; 15,025	0–1
2	April 25	Seattle	W 115–101	Tim Hardaway (23)	Billy Owens (12)	Chris Mullin (6)	Oakland–Alameda County Coliseum Arena; 15,025	1–1
3	April 28	@ Seattle	L 128–129	Sarunas Marciulionis (27)	Billy Owens (7)	Hardaway, Marciulionis (8)	Seattle Center Coliseum; 14,252	1–2
4	April 30	@ Seattle	L 116–119	Tim Hardaway (27)	Chris Gatling (12)	Tim Hardaway (11)	Seattle Center Coliseum; 14,252	1–3

1992 schedule

== Player statistics ==
Legend
GP	Games played	GS	Games started	MPG	Minutes per game
FG%	Field-goal percentage	3P%	3-point field-goal percentage	FT%	Free-throw percentage
RPG	Rebounds per game	APG	Assists per game	SPG	Steals per game
BPG	Blocks per game	PPG	Points per game

=== Regular season ===
Player	GP	GS	MPG	FG%	3P%	FT%	RPG	APG	SPG	BPG	PPG
Tyrone Hill	82	75	23.0	.522	.000	.694	7.2	.6	.9	.5	8.2
Chris Mullin	81	81	41.3	.524	.366	.833	5.6	3.5	2.1	.8	25.6
Tim Hardaway	81	81	41.1	.461	.338	.766	3.8	10.0	2.0	.2	23.4
Billy Owens	80	77	31.4	.525	.111	.654	8.0	2.4	1.1	.8	14.3
Victor Alexander	80	28	16.9	.529	.000	.691	4.2	.4	.6	.8	7.4
Vincent Askew	80	10	18.7	.509	.100	.694	2.9	2.4	.6	.3	6.2
Mario Elie	79	32	21.2	.521	.329	.852	2.9	2.2	.9	.2	7.8
Šarūnas Marčiulionis	72	5	29.4	.538	.300	.788	2.9	3.4	1.6	.1	18.9
Chris Gatling	54	1	11.3	.568	.000	.661	3.4	.3	.6	.7	5.7
Tom Tolbert	35	0	8.9	.384	.250	.550	1.6	.6	.3	.2	2.6
Jim Petersen	27	2	6.3	.450	.000	.700	1.7	.3	.2	.2	1.6
Alton Lister	26	12	11.3	.557		.424	3.5	.5	.2	.6	3.9
Rod Higgins	25	6	21.4	.412	.347	.814	3.4	.9	.6	.5	10.2
Jud Buechler^{†}	15	0	8.1	.303	.000	.750	1.9	.7	.6	.2	1.9
Kenny Battle^{†}	8	0	5.8	.615	.000	.500	.9	.5	.1	.3	2.3
Tony Massenburg^{†}	7	0	3.1	.625		.667	1.7	.0	.0	.0	2.3
Jaren Jackson	5	0	10.8	.478		.667	2.0	.6	.4	.0	5.2
Mike Smrek	2	0	1.5				.5	.0	.0	.0	.0
Billy Thompson	1	0	1.0				.0	.0	.0	.0	.0

=== Playoffs ===
Player	GP	GS	MPG	FG%	3P%	FT%	RPG	APG	SPG	BPG	PPG
Tim Hardaway	4	4	44.0	.400	.345	.649	3.8	7.3	3.3	.0	24.5
Chris Mullin	4	4	42.0	.429	.333	.929	3.0	3.0	1.3	.5	17.8
Billy Owens	4	4	39.3	.526		.630	8.3	3.3	2.0	.5	19.3
Alton Lister	4	3	11.8	.400		.800	2.8	.3	.0	1.0	4.0
Mario Elie	4	2	20.0	.639	1.000	.667	5.5	2.5	1.3	.0	12.5
Tyrone Hill	4	1	11.8	.429		.000	2.0	.3	.5	.0	1.5
Šarūnas Marčiulionis	4	0	33.3	.532	.500	.829	2.3	5.0	.8	.3	21.3
Chris Gatling	4	0	20.3	.621		.636	6.3	.0	.5	2.5	12.5
Vincent Askew	4	0	7.5	.125			1.0	1.3	.0	.0	.5
Victor Alexander	4	0	6.0	.600		1.000	1.5	.3	.5	.0	1.8
Rod Higgins	2	2	8.5	.400	.000	1.000	.0	.5	.5	.0	3.0

- ^{†} Denotes player spent time with another team in the season. Stats reflect time with the Warriors only.

Player statistics citation:

== Awards and records ==
- Chris Mullin, NBA All-Star Game
- Tim Hardaway, NBA All-Star Game
- Don Nelson, NBA Coach of the Year Award
- Chris Mullin, All-NBA First Team
- Tim Hardaway, All-NBA Second Team
- Billy Owens, NBA All-Rookie Team 1st Team

== See also ==
- 1991–92 NBA season
