= Marty Conlon =

American basketball player (born 1968)

Personal information
- Born: January 19, 1968 (age 58) The Bronx, New York, U.S.
- Listed height: 6 ft 10 in (2.08 m)
- Listed weight: 224 lb (102 kg)

Career information
- High school: Archbishop Stepinac (White Plains, New York)
- College: Providence (1986–1990)
- NBA draft: 1990: undrafted
- Playing career: 1990–2005
- Position: Power forward / center
- Number: 24, 25, 7, 50, 30, 40, 31

Career history
- 1990–1991: Rockford Lightning
- 1991: Le Mans
- 1991–1992: Seattle SuperSonics
- 1992–1993: Sacramento Kings
- 1994: Charlotte Hornets
- 1994: Washington Bullets
- 1994–1996: Milwaukee Bucks
- 1996–1997: Boston Celtics
- 1997: Fortitudo Bologna
- 1998–1999: Miami Heat
- 1999–2000: Los Angeles Clippers
- 2000: Jabones Pardo Fuenlabrada
- 2000–2001: Scaligera Basket Verona
- 2001–2002: Maroussi BC
- 2002–2003: Pompea Napoli
- 2004: Polaris World CB Murcia
- 2005: Carpisa Napoli

Career highlights
- Third-team All-Big East (1990)
- Stats at NBA.com
- Stats at Basketball Reference

Martin McBride Conlon (born January 19, 1968) is an Irish-American former professional basketball player whose career in the National Basketball Association (NBA) lasted from 1992 through 2000. Conlon started his basketball career at Archbishop Stepinac High School in White Plains, New York. In his freshman year in college he played on the Providence College team that went to the Final Four. His coach that year was Rick Pitino. He played for eight different teams during his NBA career.

Conlon played for the Seattle SuperSonics, the Sacramento Kings, the Charlotte Hornets, the Washington Bullets, the Milwaukee Bucks, the Boston Celtics, the Miami Heat, and the Los Angeles Clippers.

After his NBA career came to an end, he continued to play professional basketball in Europe, where he played in Italy, Greece, Spain, and Ireland where he was the captain of the Irish national basketball team.

== Season with Celtics ==
The only season he spent with the Celtics came in the 1996–97 season. The Celtics only won 15 games. Conlon was an important member of that team for 74 games (starting 15) averaging around 7.5 ppg and 4.5 rebounds for 21 minutes per game.

== NBA career statistics ==
Legend
| GP | Games played | GS | Games started | MPG | Minutes per game |
| FG% | Field goal percentage | 3P% | 3-point field goal percentage | FT% | Free throw percentage |
| RPG | Rebounds per game | APG | Assists per game | SPG | Steals per game |
| BPG | Blocks per game | PPG | Points per game | **Bold** | Career high |
| * | Led the league |

=== Regular season ===
| Year | Team | GP | GS | MPG | FG% | 3P% | FT% | RPG | APG | SPG | BPG | PPG |
|---|---|---|---|---|---|---|---|---|---|---|---|---|
| 1991–92 | Seattle | 45 | 1 | 8.5 | .475 | .000 | .750 | 1.5 | 0.3 | 0.2 | 0.2 | 2.7 |
| 1992–93 | Sacramento | 46 | 0 | 10.2 | .474 | .000 | .704 | 2.7 | 0.8 | 0.3 | 0.1 | 4.8 |
| 1993–94 | Charlotte | 16 | 8 | 23.6 | **.606** | .000 | .816 | **5.6** | **1.8** | 0.3 | **0.4** | **10.2** |
| 1993–94 | Washington | 14 | 1 | 14.4 | .518 | .000 | .800 | 3.6 | 0.4 | 0.3 | 0.1 | 5.0 |
| 1994–95 | Milwaukee | **82*** | 3 | **25.2** | .532 | **.276** | .613 | 5.2 | 1.3 | 0.5 | 0.2 | 9.9 |
| 1995–96 | Milwaukee | 74 | 1 | 12.9 | .468 | .167 | .764 | 2.4 | 0.9 | 0.3 | 0.1 | 5.3 |
| 1996–97 | Boston | 74 | **15** | 21.8 | .471 | .200 | .842 | 4.4 | 1.4 | **0.6** | 0.2 | 7.8 |
| 1997–98 | Miami | 18 | 0 | 11.6 | .452 | .000 | .727 | 2.6 | 0.7 | 0.5 | 0.3 | 4.9 |
| 1998–99 | Miami | 7 | 0 | 5.0 | .231 | .000 | **1.000** | 0.7 | 0.1 | 0.0 | 0.1 | 1.1 |
| 1999–00 | Los Angeles | 3 | 0 | 3.0 | .500 | .000 | .000 | 0.7 | 0.0 | 0.0 | 0.0 | 0.7 |
| Career | | 379 | 29 | 16.7 | .498 | .200 | .735 | 3.5 | 1.0 | 0.4 | 0.2 | 6.5 |

=== Playoffs ===
| Year | Team | GP | GS | MPG | FG% | 3P% | FT% | RPG | APG | SPG | BPG | PPG |
|---|---|---|---|---|---|---|---|---|---|---|---|---|
| 1991–92 | Seattle | 1 | 0 | 1.0 | .000 | .000 | **1.000** | 1.0 | 0.0 | 0.0 | 0.0 | 2.0 |
| 1997–98 | Miami | **3** | 0 | **15.3** | **.429** | .000 | .500 | **1.3** | **1.0** | **0.3** | **0.3** | **2.3** |
| Career | | 4 | 0 | 11.8 | .375 | .000 | .750 | 1.3 | 0.8 | 0.3 | 0.3 | 2.3 |

== Personal life ==
Conlon was born to parents who had immigrated from County Mayo in Ireland to New York. He was raised in Ireland and Yonkers, New York.
