= Craig Ehlo =

American basketball player (born 1961)

- Ehlo with the Cleveland Cavaliers in 1987

Personal information
- Born: August 11, 1961 (age 65) Lubbock, Texas, U.S.
- Listed height: 6 ft 6 in (1.98 m)
- Listed weight: 180 lb (82 kg)

Career information
- High school: Monterey (Lubbock, Texas)
- College: Odessa College (1979–1981); Washington State (1981–1983)
- NBA draft: 1983: 3rd round, 48th overall pick
- Drafted by: Houston Rockets
- Playing career: 1983–1997
- Position: Shooting guard
- Number: 3

Career history

Playing
- 1983–1986: Houston Rockets
- 1986: Mississippi Jets
- 1987–1993: Cleveland Cavaliers
- 1993–1996: Atlanta Hawks
- 1996–1997: Seattle SuperSonics

Coaching
- 2011–2013: Eastern Washington (assistant)

Career NBA statistics
- Points: 7,492 (8.6 ppg)
- Rebounds: 3,139 (3.6 rpg)
- Assists: 2,456 (2.8 apg)
- Stats at NBA.com
- Stats at Basketball Reference

Joel Craig Ehlo (/ˈiːloʊ/; born August 11, 1961) is an American former basketball player. He played fifteen seasons in the National Basketball Association (NBA) with four teams, amassing career totals of 7,492 points, 2,456 assists and 3,139 rebounds.

== Playing career ==
A 6 ft 6 in (1.98 m) guard/forward from Odessa Junior College and Washington State University, and led the Cougars to the NCAA tournament in his senior season. Ehlo was selected in the third round of the 1983 NBA draft by the Houston Rockets, and went with the Rockets to the 1986 NBA Finals in a losing cause to the Boston Celtics.

Ehlo spent the majority of his career with the Cleveland Cavaliers, and was originally signed when Mark Price went down with an injury. With Cleveland, he tallied 5,130 points, 2,285 assists, and 2,267 rebounds in seven seasons (1987–1993). Ehlo is perhaps best remembered for being the victim of one of Chicago Bulls star Michael Jordan's greatest performances. On May 7, 1989, Ehlo was defending Jordan when he made "The Shot", the series-clinching jumper in the first round of the NBA Playoffs in front of a Cleveland home crowd, then considered an upset as the Cavaliers were the third seed in the east and Chicago was the sixth. Ehlo's career high in points was 31, achieved three times: v. Michael Jordan, Dominique Wilkins, and Ron Harper.

Ehlo spent the second half of his career with the Atlanta Hawks as Steve Smith's backup. Before the 1996–97 season, he signed with the Seattle SuperSonics, but was used sparingly and did not play during the playoffs. He was waived by the SuperSonics in October that year before the start of the 1997–98 season.

== Post-retirement ==
Ehlo worked as an analyst on Gonzaga men's basketball games for five seasons, then became an assistant coach for Eastern Washington University in 2011. He coached at EWU for two years, until resigning on July 11, 2013. Later that year, Ehlo underwent drug treatment owing to an addiction to prescription painkillers following back surgery.

In July 2019, Ehlo was hired as a color analyst on all Washington State Cougars men's basketball home games during the 2019–20 season.

== NBA career statistics ==
Legend
GP	Games played	GS	Games started	MPG	Minutes per game
FG%	Field goal percentage	3P%	3-point field goal percentage	FT%	Free throw percentage
RPG	Rebounds per game	APG	Assists per game	SPG	Steals per game
BPG	Blocks per game	PPG	Points per game	**Bold**	Career high

=== Regular season ===
Year	Team	GP	GS	MPG	FG%	3P%	FT%	RPG	APG	SPG	BPG	PPG
1983–84	Houston	7	0	9.0	.407	—	**1.000**	1.3	.9	.4	.0	3.3
1984–85	Houston	45	0	4.2	**.493**	.000	.633	.6	.6	.2	.1	1.9
1985–86	Houston	36	0	5.5	.429	.333	.793	1.3	.8	.3	.1	2.7
1986–87	Cavaliers	44	15	20.2	.414	.172	.707	3.7	2.1	.9	**.7**	6.2
1987–88	Cavaliers	79	27	21.6	.466	.344	.674	3.2	2.6	1.0	.4	7.1
1988–89	Cavaliers	**82**	4	22.8	.475	.390	.607	3.6	3.2	1.3	.2	7.4
1989–90	Cavaliers	81	64	**35.7**	.464	**.419**	.681	**5.4**	**4.6**	1.6	.3	**13.6**
1990–91	Cavaliers	**82**	68	33.7	.445	.329	.679	4.7	**4.6**	1.5	.4	10.1
1991–92	Cavaliers	63	62	32.0	.453	.413	.707	4.9	3.8	1.2	.3	12.3
1992–93	Cavaliers	**82**	**73**	31.2	.490	.381	.717	4.9	3.1	1.3	.3	11.6
1993–94	Atlanta	**82**	0	26.2	.446	.348	.727	3.4	3.3	**1.7**	.3	10.0
1994–95	Atlanta	49	0	23.8	.453	.381	.620	3.0	2.3	.9	.1	9.7
1995–96	Atlanta	79	8	22.3	.428	.371	.786	3.2	1.7	1.1	.1	8.5
1996–97	Seattle	62	0	13.7	.351	.284	.500	1.8	1.1	.6	.1	3.5
Career		873	321	24.1	.453	.369	.689	3.6	2.8	1.1	.3	8.6

=== Playoffs ===
Year	Team	GP	GS	MPG	FG%	3P%	FT%	RPG	APG	SPG	BPG	PPG
1985	Houston	3	0	2.0	**1.000**	—	**1.000**	5.0	.5	.3	**.5**	1.3
1986	Houston	10	0	3.8	.500	.000	.800	.3	.6	.4	.1	2.0
1988	Cavaliers	5	1	25.6	.425	.000	.625	3.6	3.4	1.0	.0	8.8
1989	Cavaliers	4	1	24.8	.436	.385	.818	1.5	3.3	.8	.3	12.0
1990	Cavaliers	5	5	**39.2**	.419	.333	.632	**6.4**	**6.4**	1.2	.0	**13.8**
1992	Cavaliers	**17**	**14**	32.5	.414	**.412**	.762	4.5	4.5	1.2	.3	9.6
1993	Cavaliers	9	9	32.1	.418	.385	.800	3.4	2.8	**1.3**	.4	10.9
1994	Atlanta	11	0	28.8	.424	.348	.708	2.7	3.6	1.0	.0	11.4
1995	Atlanta	3	0	16.3	.167	.167	**1.000**	2.3	1.0	.7	.0	3.0
1996	Atlanta	9	0	19.0	.293	.304	.714	2.0	1.0	1.0	.2	4.0
Career		76	30	24.3	.409	.343	.734	2.9	2.9	1.0	.2	8.1
