= Larry Nance =

American basketball player (born 1959)

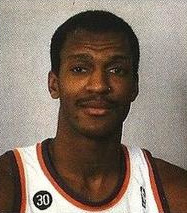
- Nance with the Phoenix Suns in 1987

Personal information
- Born: February 12, 1959 (age 67) Anderson, South Carolina, U.S.
- Listed height: 6 ft 10 in (2.08 m)
- Listed weight: 205 lb (93 kg)

Career information
- High school: McDuffie (Anderson, South Carolina)
- College: Clemson (1977–1981)
- NBA draft: 1981: 1st round, 20th overall pick
- Drafted by: Phoenix Suns
- Playing career: 1981–1994
- Position: Power forward
- Number: 22, 6

Career history
- 1981–1988: Phoenix Suns
- 1988–1994: Cleveland Cavaliers

Career highlights
- 3× NBA All-Star (1985, 1989, 1993); NBA All-Defensive First Team (1989); 2× NBA All-Defensive Second Team (1992, 1993); NBA Slam Dunk Contest champion (1984); No. 22 retired by Cleveland Cavaliers; Second-team All-ACC (1981)

Career NBA statistics
- Points: 15,687 (17.1 ppg)
- Rebounds: 7,067 (8.0 rpg)
- Blocks: 2,027 (2.2 bpg)
- Stats at NBA.com
- Stats at Basketball Reference

Larry Donnell Nance Sr. (born February 12, 1959) is an American former professional basketball player. A power forward from Clemson University, Nance played 13 seasons in the National Basketball Association (NBA) as a member of the Phoenix Suns and Cleveland Cavaliers. He was a three-time NBA All-Star.

Nance scored 15,687 career points and grabbed 7,067 career rebounds, but he is perhaps best known for his acrobatic leaping ability. A talent that earned him the first NBA Slam Dunk Contest championship in 1984, and the nickname "The High-Ayatolla of Slamola". Nance was a model of consistency throughout his NBA career. He averaged over 16 points and 8 rebounds per game for all eleven seasons as a starter. His best scoring-average season was in the 1986–1987, when he averaged 22.5 points per game. Always among the highest in field goal percentage, Nance was an excellent mid-range shooter as well as a talented inside player. He currently resides in Novelty, Ohio.

== College career ==
Nance played power forward for the Clemson Tigers, who made it to the Elite Eight in his junior year. He was All-ACC in 1981.

== Professional career ==
=== Phoenix Suns (1981-1988) ===
Nance was taken by the Phoenix Suns as the 20th pick in this first round of the 1981 NBA draft.

He was involved in a trade between the Suns and the Cavaliers in 1988. Nance's stint in Phoenix came to an end on February 25, 1988, when, with the Suns struggling to a 16–35 mark, he was traded with Mike Sanders and Detroit's 1st round pick (No. 22 overall) in 1988 (used to select Randolph Keys) to Cleveland for Kevin Johnson, Mark West, Tyrone Corbin and Cleveland's first and second round picks in 1988 (used to select Dan Majerle and Dean Garrett) respectively) and the Lakers' second round pick in 1989 (used to select Greg Grant).

=== Cleveland Cavaliers (1988-1994) ===
The trade worked out for both teams, as Nance proved to be the missing piece Cleveland needed to contend for a title in the East, while at the same time playing the role of frontcourt post partner to center Brad Daugherty before a series of back injuries forced the five-time All-Star to retire at just 29. For the Suns, Johnson, Majerle and West became key players in the team's late 1980s and early 1990s success, including a trip to the 1993 NBA Finals.

Nance missed most of the 1993–1994 season, including the playoffs, due to a knee injury which required two arthroscopic knee surgeries. After the knee did not respond to treatment during the offseason, he announced his retirement in September 1994 at 35.

Nance was a 3-time NBA All-Star (1985, 1989, and 1993), an NBA All-Defensive Team First Team member in 1989, and a Second Team Member in 1992 and 1993. He was also consistently one of the league's better shot blockers, averaging 2.2 blocks per game during his career. Upon his retirement, he held the NBA record for most blocked shots by a non-center in NBA history.

== NBA career statistics ==
Legend
GP	Games played	GS	Games started	MPG	Minutes per game
FG%	Field goal percentage	3P%	3-point field goal percentage	FT%	Free throw percentage
RPG	Rebounds per game	APG	Assists per game	SPG	Steals per game
BPG	Blocks per game	PPG	Points per game	**Bold**	Career high

=== Regular season ===
Year	Team	GP	GS	MPG	FG%	3P%	FT%	RPG	APG	SPG	BPG	PPG
1981–82	Phoenix	80	0	14.8	.521	.000	.641	3.2	1.0	.5	.9	6.6
1982–83	Phoenix	**82**	**82**	35.5	.550	.333	.672	8.7	2.4	1.2	2.6	16.7
1983–84	Phoenix	**82**	**82**	35.4	.576	.000	.707	8.3	2.6	1.0	2.1	17.7
1984–85	Phoenix	61	55	36.1	**.587**	.500	.709	8.8	2.6	**1.4**	1.7	19.9
1985–86	Phoenix	73	69	34.0	.581	.000	.698	8.5	3.3	1.0	1.8	20.2
1986–87	Phoenix	69	67	**37.2**	.551	.200	.773	8.7	**3.4**	1.2	2.1	**22.5**
1987–88	Phoenix	40	34	36.9	.531	.400	.751	**9.9**	3.1	1.1	2.4	21.1
1987–88	Cleveland	27	26	33.6	.526	.000	**.830**	7.9	3.1	.7	2.3	16.2
1988–89	Cleveland	73	72	34.6	.539	.000	.799	8.0	2.2	.8	2.8	17.2
1989–90	Cleveland	62	53	33.3	.511	**1.000**	.778	8.3	2.6	.9	2.0	16.3
1990–91	Cleveland	80	78	36.6	.524	.250	.803	8.6	3.0	.8	2.5	19.2
1991–92	Cleveland	81	81	35.6	.539	.000	.822	8.3	2.9	1.0	**3.0**	17.0
1992–93	Cleveland	77	77	35.8	.549	.000	.818	8.7	2.9	.7	2.6	16.5
1993–94	Cleveland	33	19	27.5	.487	.000	.753	6.9	1.5	.8	1.7	11.2
Career		920	795	33.4	.546	.145	.755	8.0	2.6	.9	2.2	17.1
All-Star		3	0	14.7	.714	.000	.750	4.7	.7	.7	1.3	11.0

=== Playoffs ===
Year	Team	GP	GS	MPG	FG%	3P%	FT%	RPG	APG	SPG	BPG	PPG
1982	Phoenix	7	0	18.3	**.610**	.000	.500	4.6	1.0	**1.4**	1.6	7.7
1983	Phoenix	3	0	34.3	.400	.000	.800	8.3	1.0	1.0	2.0	12.0
1984	Phoenix	**17**	0	37.2	.590	.000	.671	8.7	2.4	.9	2.0	16.9
1988	Cleveland	5	5	40.0	.531	.000	**.889**	7.2	**3.6**	.4	2.2	16.8
1989	Cleveland	5	5	39.0	.551	.000	.656	7.8	3.2	.6	2.4	**19.4**
1990	Cleveland	5	5	31.8	.578	.000	.750	4.8	2.4	.6	2.0	12.2
1992	Cleveland	**17**	**17**	**40.1**	.494	.000	.829	**9.2**	2.5	.8	**2.7**	18.0
1993	Cleveland	9	9	36.6	.565	.000	.767	8.2	2.3	.9	1.6	16.1
Career		68	41	35.7	.541	.000	.742	7.9	2.4	.9	2.1	15.7

== Personal life ==
Nance's elder son, Larry Nance Jr., played college basketball for Wyoming before being selected in the 1st round of the 2015 NBA draft (with the 27th overall pick) by the Los Angeles Lakers. He played two and a half seasons in LA before being traded to the Cleveland Cavaliers in February 2018. Nance granted the Cavaliers permission to let his son wear his retired no. 22 jersey.

Nance's daughter, Casey, played college basketball for Dayton.

Another son, Pete, played for the Northwestern Wildcats and University of North Carolina Tar Heels, and was signed by the Cavaliers in January 2024, making him Nance's second son to play for the Cavs.

Nance owns a 1967 Camaro NHRA drag racer, "Catch 22", which his team races on weekends.

== See also ==
- List of NBA career blocks leaders
- List of NBA career field goal percentage leaders
- List of NBA single-game blocks leaders
