= Phills =

Phills may refer to:

- a nickname for the Philadelphia Phillies, a Major League Baseball team
- Bobby Phills (1969–2000), an American basketball player
