= Brad Daugherty =

American basketball player (born 1965)

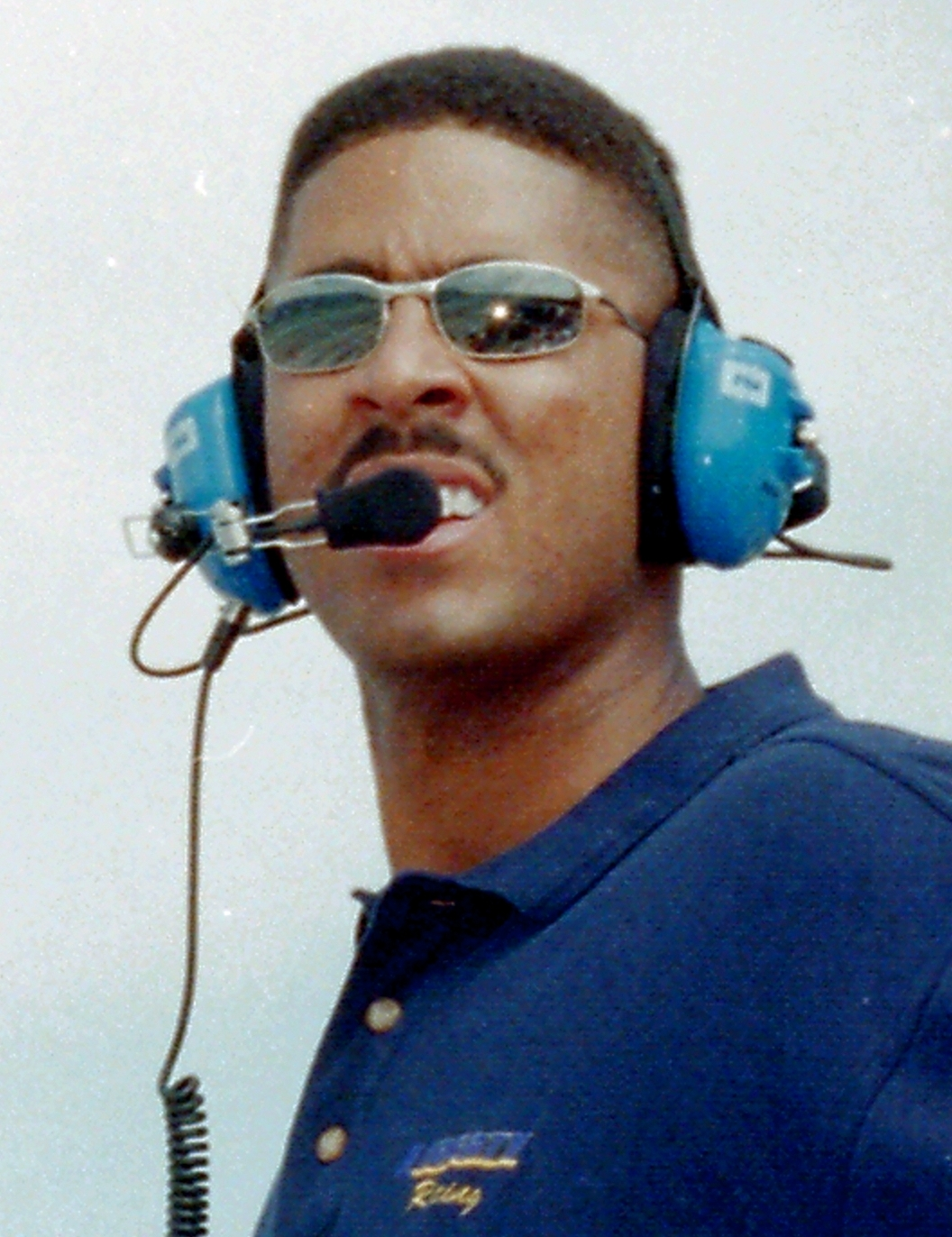
- Daugherty in 1999

Personal information
- Born: October 19, 1965 (age 61) Black Mountain, North Carolina, U.S.
- Listed height: 7 ft 0 in (2.13 m)
- Listed weight: 245 lb (111 kg)

Career information
- High school: Charles D. Owen (Black Mountain, North Carolina)
- College: North Carolina (1982–1986)
- NBA draft: 1986: 1st round, 1st overall pick
- Drafted by: Cleveland Cavaliers
- Playing career: 1986–1994
- Position: Center
- Number: 43

Career history
- 1986–1994: Cleveland Cavaliers

Career highlights
- 5× NBA All-Star (1988, 1989, 1991–1993); All-NBA Third Team (1992); NBA All-Rookie First Team (1987); No. 43 retired by Cleveland Cavaliers; Consensus second-team All-American (1986); 2× First-team All-ACC (1985, 1986); No. 42 honored by North Carolina Tar Heels; First-team Parade All-American (1982); McDonald's All-American (1982)

Career NBA statistics
- Points: 10,389 (19.0 ppg)
- Rebounds: 5,227 (9.5 rpg)
- Assists: 2,028 (3.7 apg)
- Stats at NBA.com
- Stats at Basketball Reference

Bradley Lee Daugherty (born October 19, 1965), nicknamed "Big Train" and "El Gato Grande", is an American former professional basketball player. He played college basketball for the North Carolina Tar Heels and professionally with the Cleveland Cavaliers of the National Basketball Association (NBA).

Daugherty is a co-owner of NASCAR Cup Series team Hyak Motorsports. Daugherty's race teams have won in the Truck Series, O'Reilly Auto Parts Series and the Cup Series, including the 2023 Daytona 500. Daugherty is the two-time Emmy Award Winning Color Analyst for the Cleveland Cavaliers of the NBA.

== Amateur career ==
Daugherty played basketball at Charles D. Owen High School in Black Mountain, North Carolina, where he led the Warhorses to the 1982 state finals. Daugherty accepted a scholarship to play at the University of North Carolina under legendary college basketball coach Dean Smith.

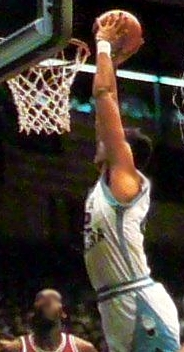
Daugherty playing for North Carolina in 1985.

Daugherty was one of the greatest big men ever to play at the University of North Carolina. He entered college as a 16-year-old freshman and was a two-time All-ACC first team selection, and a first team All-American in 1986. He was named to the ACC 50th Anniversary men's basketball team in 2002 and was inducted into the North Carolina Sports Hall of Fame. Daugherty averaged more than twenty points per game in his senior season.

== Professional career ==
=== Cleveland Cavaliers (1986–1994) ===
Daugherty was taken as the first overall pick by the Cleveland Cavaliers in the 1986 NBA draft. Cleveland had obtained the rights to the first pick in a trade with the Philadelphia 76ers for Roy Hinson and cash. The Cavaliers also drafted Ron Harper with the eighth pick in the 1986 draft and obtained the rights to Mark Price (in a trade with the Dallas Mavericks) with the 25th pick (second round). Harper, Price and Daugherty, along with fellow rookie John "Hot Rod" Williams immediately began to pay dividends for Cleveland. Daugherty, Williams, and Harper were all named to the 1986–87 All-Rookie team.

Daugherty averaged nineteen points and ten rebounds per game over eight seasons in the NBA and retired as the Cavaliers all-time leading scorer (10,389 points) and rebounder (5,227). Daugherty's all time-leading scorer record stood until March 21, 2008, when LeBron James broke the point record against the Toronto Raptors. His leading rebounder record stood until December 9, 2008, when Žydrūnas Ilgauskas broke the rebound record, again against the Raptors. He played in 41 postseason games and led the Cavaliers as far as the Eastern Conference Finals in 1992. He was a five time All-Star (1988, 1989, 1991, 1992, 1993). As part of the Cavaliers' 30th anniversary in 1999–2000, Daugherty was a unanimous selection to the All-Time Cleveland Cavalier team.

1987-88 Headshot

Daugherty's career in the NBA was cut short at the age of 28 because of recurring back troubles. He never played another game after the 1993–94 season, though he did make one appearance in uniform for the Whoopi Goldberg movie Eddie along with teammates Hot Rod Williams, John Battle, Terrell Brandon, and Bobby Phills. After two consecutive seasons of inactivity, he announced his retirement after the 1995–96 season. His #43 jersey, a number he picked as a tribute to NASCAR legend Richard Petty (whom Daugherty lists as his favorite sportsman) was retired by the Cavaliers on March 1, 1997.

== Career statistics ==
Legend
GP	Games played	GS	Games started	MPG	Minutes per game
FG%	Field goal percentage	3P%	3-point field goal percentage	FT%	Free throw percentage
RPG	Rebounds per game	APG	Assists per game	SPG	Steals per game
BPG	Blocks per game	PPG	Points per game	**Bold**	Career high

=== College ===
Year	Team	GP	GS	MPG	FG%	3P%	FT%	RPG	APG	SPG	BPG	PPG
1982–83	North Carolina	35	–	23.3	.558	.000	.663	5.2	.9	.3	1.0	8.2
1983–84	North Carolina	30	–	27.4	.610	–	.678	5.6	1.4	.6	1.0	10.5
1984–85	North Carolina	**36**	–	**34.7**	.625	–	**.742**	**9.7**	**2.1**	.8	**1.3**	17.3
1985–86	North Carolina	34	**34**	32.0	**.648**	–	.684	9.0	1.8	**1.0**	1.1	**20.2**
Career		135	34	29.4	.620	.000	.700	7.4	1.6	.7	1.1	14.2

=== NBA ===
==== Regular season ====
Year	Team	GP	GS	MPG	FG%	3P%	FT%	RPG	APG	SPG	BPG	PPG
1986–87	Cleveland	**80**	**80**	33.7	.538	.000	.696	8.1	3.8	0.6	0.8	15.7
1987–88	Cleveland	79	78	37.4	.510	.000	.716	8.4	4.2	0.6	0.7	18.7
1988–89	Cleveland	78	78	36.2	.538	.333	.737	9.2	3.7	0.8	0.5	18.9
1989–90	Cleveland	41	40	35.1	.479	.000	.704	9.1	3.2	0.7	0.5	16.8
1990–91	Cleveland	76	76	**38.8**	.524	.000	.751	**10.9**	3.3	**1.0**	0.6	**21.6**
1991–92	Cleveland	73	73	36.2	.570	.000	.777	10.4	3.6	0.9	**1.1**	21.5
1992–93	Cleveland	71	71	37.9	**.571**	**.500**	**.795**	10.2	**4.4**	0.7	0.8	20.2
1993–94	Cleveland	50	50	36.8	.488	.000	.785	10.2	3.0	0.8	0.7	17.0
Career		548	546	36.5	.532	.143	.747	9.5	3.7	0.8	0.7	19.0

==== Playoffs ====
Year	Team	GP	GS	MPG	FG%	3P%	FT%	RPG	APG	SPG	BPG	PPG
1988	Cleveland	5	5	**40.8**	.460	.000	.677	9.2	3.2	0.4	**1.4**	15.8
1989	Cleveland	5	5	33.4	.362	.000	.600	9.2	2.4	**1.2**	1.0	11.0
1990	Cleveland	5	5	37.2	**.586**	.000	.696	9.6	**4.0**	0.4	0.8	**22.8**
1992	Cleveland	**17**	**17**	40.4	.528	.000	**.814**	10.2	3.4	0.6	1.0	21.5
1993	Cleveland	9	9	39.6	.557	.000	.800	**11.7**	3.4	0.7	0.8	18.7
Career		41	41	39.0	.519	.000	.756	10.2	3.3	0.7	1.0	19.1

== Post-basketball career ==
Daugherty's business interests include car dealerships, waste management and commercial real estate. He is also an NBA analyst and is a NASCAR broadcaster for NBC. He is active in many charities including Headlock on Hunger which address any need for residents of WNC, primarily heating, clothing, medicine and food. At UNC, he has given to the Sonja Haynes Stone Center for Black Culture and History and has served on the Board of Visitors and the athletic council of the General Alumni Association Board.

Following his retirement from the NBA, Daugherty co-owned the NASCAR Craftsman Truck Series team Liberty Racing, featuring such drivers as Kenny Irwin Jr. and Kevin Harvick. In 1997 Irwin won two Craftsman Truck Series races driving for Daugherty (Homestead-Miami Speedway in March and Texas Motor Speedway in June). Daugherty joined ESPN's return to NASCAR racing telecasts in 2007. He was an analyst on the weekly topical show Inside NASCAR on Showtime, and on NASCAR Now, a nightly newscast on the sport. He is also part owner of Hyak Motorsports, which owns the No. 47 Camaro ZL1 1LE driven by Ricky Stenhouse Jr. The team's first win came in 2014 at Watkins Glen International with A.J. Allmendinger driving the No. 47 Chevrolet. Their second win came in the 2023 Daytona 500 with Ricky Stenhouse Jr. winning. With the win, Daugherty became the first black principal owner to win the Daytona 500.

In November 2014, Daugherty began as an NBA and college basketball analyst for ESPN.

After years of animosity for the team's handling of his close friend and former General Manager Wayne Embry, Daugherty joined Fox Sports Ohio for select Cavaliers telecasts in the 2019–20 season as part of the franchise's 50th season celebration.

On July 28, 2020, Daugherty became an analyst for NASCAR on NBC from the first Michigan International Speedway race onwards. Daugherty also served as a roaming reporter for CBS Sports coverage of the 2021 SRX Series.

On August 20, 2020, Daugherty represented the Cleveland Cavaliers in the 2020 NBA draft Lottery.

As of the 2023–24 season, Daugherty is currently a part of the Cavaliers broadcast team alongside his NASCAR team ownership. Brad serves on various boards including OCTAGON which is the largest marketing firm in the world.
