= 1990–91 Cleveland Cavaliers season =

NBA professional basketball team season

- Head coach: Lenny Wilkens
- General manager: Wayne Embry
- Owners: Gordon Gund; George Gund III
- Arena: Richfield Coliseum

Results
- Record: 33–49 (.402)
- Place: Division: 6th (Central); Conference: 10th (Eastern)
- Playoff finish: Did not qualify
- Stats at Basketball Reference

Local media
- Television: SportsChannel Ohio; WOIO
- Radio: WWWE

The 1990–91 Cleveland Cavaliers season was the 21st season for the Cleveland Cavaliers in the National Basketball Association.

== Season summary ==
=== Off-season ===
After playing overseas in Italy the previous season, Danny Ferry made his debut in the NBA, signing a contract with the Cavaliers; the Cavaliers had acquired Ferry from the Los Angeles Clippers, who selected him as the second overall pick in the 1989 NBA draft. During the off-season, the team signed free agent Gerald Paddio.

=== Regular season ===
With the addition of Ferry, the Cavaliers lost their first two games of the regular season, but then won six of their next seven games, and held a 9–7 record at the end of November. However, after only just 16 games, Mark Price sustained a torn ACL in his left knee, and was out for the remainder of the season, while sixth man Hot Rod Williams only played just 43 games due to a left foot injury. In December, the team re-signed free agent Darnell Valentine as their starting point guard in Price's absence, and also signed undrafted rookie small forward Henry James.

Without Price and Williams, and after a 10–8 start to the season, the Cavaliers struggled falling below .500 in winning percentage, losing 17 of their next 18 games, posting a six-game losing streak in December, and then posting an 11-game losing streak between December and January, as the team held a 15–32 record at the All-Star break. However, the team played above .500 for the remainder of the season, winning eight of their eleven games in April, including a four-game winning streak to close the season. The Cavaliers finished in sixth place in the Central Division with a disappointing 33–49 record, and failed to qualify for the NBA playoffs.

Brad Daugherty averaged 21.6 points and 10.9 rebounds per game, while Larry Nance averaged 19.2 points, 8.6 rebounds and 2.5 blocks per game, and Price provided the team with 16.9 points, 10.4 assists and 2.6 steals per game. In addition, Williams provided with 11.7 points, 6.7 rebounds and 1.6 blocks per game, while Craig Ehlo contributed 10.1 points, 4.6 assists and 1.5 steals per game, and Valentine contributed 9.4 points, 5.4 assists and 1.5 steals per game. Meanwhile, Ferry averaged 8.6 points and 3.5 rebounds per game, second-year forward Chucky Brown provided with 8.5 points per game, James contributed 8.1 points per game in 37 games, Paddio averaged 7.2 points per game, John Morton provided with 5.4 points and 3.7 assists per game, and Steve Kerr contributed 4.8 points and 2.3 assists per game.

During the NBA All-Star weekend at the Charlotte Coliseum in Charlotte, North Carolina, Daugherty was selected for the 1991 NBA All-Star Game, as a member of the Eastern Conference All-Star team. The Cavaliers finished twelfth in the NBA in home-game attendance, with an attendance of 623,735 at the Coliseum at Richfield during the regular season.

=== Aftermath ===
Following the season, Valentine and Paddio were both released to free agency.

== Draft picks ==
Round	Pick	Player	Position	Nationality	School/Club team
2	52	Stefano Rusconi	Center	Italy	Ranger Varese

- 1st round pick (#13) traded to Los Angeles Clippers in Danny Ferry deal. Used to draft Loy Vaught.

== Roster ==
1990–91 Cleveland Cavaliers roster
Players

Pos.	No.	Player	Height	Weight	DOB	From
F	00	Miloš Babić	7 ft 0 in (2.13 m)	240 lb (109 kg)	1968–11–23	Tennessee Tech
F	20	Winston Bennett	6 ft 7 in (2.01 m)	210 lb (95 kg)	1965–02–09	Kentucky
F	52	Chucky Brown	6 ft 7 in (2.01 m)	214 lb (97 kg)	1968–02–29	NC State
F	33	Derrick Chievous	6 ft 7 in (2.01 m)	195 lb (88 kg)	1967–07–03	Missouri
C	43	Brad Daugherty	7 ft 0 in (2.13 m)	245 lb (111 kg)	1965–10–19	North Carolina
G	3	Craig Ehlo	6 ft 6 in (1.98 m)	180 lb (82 kg)	1961–08–11	Washington State
F	35	Danny Ferry	6 ft 10 in (2.08 m)	230 lb (104 kg)	1966–10–17	Duke
F	32	Henry James	6 ft 8 in (2.03 m)	220 lb (100 kg)	1965–07–29	Saint Mary's
G	5	Steve Kerr	6 ft 3 in (1.91 m)	175 lb (79 kg)	1965–09–27	Arizona
F	23	John Morton	6 ft 3 in (1.91 m)	180 lb (82 kg)	1967–05–18	Seton Hall
F	22	Larry Nance	6 ft 10 in (2.08 m)	205 lb (93 kg)	1959–02–12	Clemson
F	24	Gerald Paddio	6 ft 7 in (2.01 m)	205 lb (93 kg)	1965–04–21	UNLV
G	25	Mark Price	6 ft 0 in (1.83 m)	170 lb (77 kg)	1964–02–15	Georgia Tech
G	1	Darnell Valentine	6 ft 1 in (1.85 m)	183 lb (83 kg)	1959–02–03	Kansas
C	18	Hot Rod Williams	6 ft 11 in (2.11 m)	215 lb (98 kg)	1962–08–09	Tulane

Coaches
Head coach
- Lenny Wilkens
Assistant(s)
- Dick Helms
- Brian Winters

Legend
- (DP) Unsigned draft pick
- (FA) Free agent
- (S) Suspended
- Injured

Roster
Updated: January 21, 1991

== Regular season ==
=== Season standings ===
Central Division	W	L	PCT	GB	Home	Road	Div
y-Chicago Bulls	61	21	.744	—	35–6	26–15	25–5
x-Detroit Pistons	50	32	.610	11	32–9	18–23	19–11
x-Milwaukee Bucks	48	34	.585	13	33–8	15–26	16–14
x-Atlanta Hawks	43	39	.524	18	29–12	14–27	11–19
x-Indiana Pacers	41	41	.500	20	29–12	12–29	15–15
Cleveland Cavaliers	33	49	.402	28	23–18	10–31	11–19
Charlotte Hornets	26	56	.317	35	17–24	9–32	8–22

y - clinched division title
x - clinched playoff spot

#	Eastern Conference				
#	Team	W	L	PCT	GB
1	c-Chicago Bulls	61	21	.744	–
2	y-Boston Celtics	56	26	.683	5
3	x-Detroit Pistons	50	32	.610	11
4	x-Milwaukee Bucks	48	34	.585	13
5	x-Philadelphia 76ers	44	38	.537	17
6	x-Atlanta Hawks	43	39	.524	18
7	x-Indiana Pacers	41	41	.500	20
8	x-New York Knicks	39	43	.476	22
9	Cleveland Cavaliers	33	49	.402	28
10	Washington Bullets	30	52	.366	31
11	New Jersey Nets	26	56	.317	35
12	Charlotte Hornets	26	56	.317	35
13	Miami Heat	24	58	.293	37

z - clinched division title
y - clinched division title
x - clinched playoff spot

=== Game log ===
1990–91 game log
Total: 33–49 (Home: 23–18; Road: 10–31)
November: 9–7 (home: 5–2; road: 4–5)

Game	Date	Team	Score	High points	High rebounds	High assists	Location Attendance	Record
7	November 13, 1990	@ Atlanta	W 121–104				The Omni; 10,645	4–3
16	November 30, 1990	@ Atlanta	W 101–93				The Omni; 11,996	9–7

December: 2–10 (home: 2–6; road: 0–4)

Game	Date	Team	Score	High points	High rebounds	High assists	Location Attendance	Record
24	December 17, 1990	Atlanta	L 98–109				Richfield Coliseum; 11,622	10–14

January: 3–11 (home: 2–3; road: 1–8)

Game	Date	Team	Score	High points	High rebounds	High assists	Location Attendance	Record

February: 6–7 (home: 5–4; road: 1–3)

Game	Date	Team	Score	High points	High rebounds	High assists	Location Attendance	Record
46	February 5, 1991	@ Atlanta	L 114–118				The Omni; 11,354	15–31

March: 5–10 (home: 3–1; road: 2–9)

Game	Date	Team	Score	High points	High rebounds	High assists	Location Attendance	Record

April: 8–3 (home: 6–1; road: 2–2)

Game	Date	Team	Score	High points	High rebounds	High assists	Location Attendance	Record
76	April 9, 1991	Atlanta	L 98–104				Richfield Coliseum; 15,235	28–48

1990–91 schedule

== Player stats ==
Legend
GP	Games played	GS	Games started	MPG	Minutes per game
FG%	Field-goal percentage	3P%	3-point field-goal percentage	FT%	Free-throw percentage
RPG	Rebounds per game	APG	Assists per game	SPG	Steals per game
BPG	Blocks per game	PPG	Points per game

Player	GP	GS	MPG	FG%	3P%	FT%	RPG	APG	SPG	BPG	PPG
Brad Daugherty	76	76	38.8	52.4	0.0	75.1	10.9	3.3	1.0	0.6	21.6
Larry Nance	80	78	36.6	52.4	25.0	80.3	8.6	3.0	0.8	2.5	19.2
Mark Price	16	16	35.7	49.7	34.0	95.2	2.8	10.4	2.6	0.1	16.9
Hot Rod Williams	43	14	30.1	46.3	0.0	65.2	6.7	2.3	0.8	1.6	11.7
Craig Ehlo	82	68	33.7	44.5	32.9	67.9	4.7	4.6	1.5	0.4	10.1
Darnell Valentine	65	60	28.3	46.4	24.0	83.1	2.6	5.4	1.5	0.2	9.4
Danny Ferry	81	2	20.5	42.8	29.9	81.6	3.5	1.8	0.5	0.3	8.6
Chucky Brown	74	51	20.1	52.4	0.0	70.1	2.9	1.1	0.4	0.3	8.5
Henry James	37	4	13.6	44.1	40.0	72.2	2.1	0.9	0.4	0.1	8.1
Gerald Paddio	70	22	16.9	41.9	25.0	79.6	1.7	1.3	0.3	0.1	7.2
John Morton	66	2	18.3	43.8	33.3	81.3	1.6	3.7	0.9	0.3	5.4
Steve Kerr	57	4	15.9	44.4	45.2	84.9	0.6	2.3	0.5	0.1	4.8
Winston Bennett	27	13	12.4	37.4	0.0	74.5	2.4	1.0	0.3	0.1	4.3
Mike Woodson	4	0	11.5	21.7	0.0	100.0	0.5	1.3	0.0	0.3	2.8
Derrick Chievous	18	0	6.1	37.0	0.0	56.3	1.0	0.1	0.2	0.1	2.4
Milos Babic	12	0	4.3	31.6	0.0	58.3	0.8	0.3	0.1	0.1	1.6

Player statistics citation:
