= List of NBA career free throw percentage leaders =

This article contains a list of the top 50 players with the highest all-time free throw percentage in the history of the National Basketball Association (NBA).

The list only includes regular season games and only includes players with at least 1,200 free throws made.

== Free throw percentage leaders ==
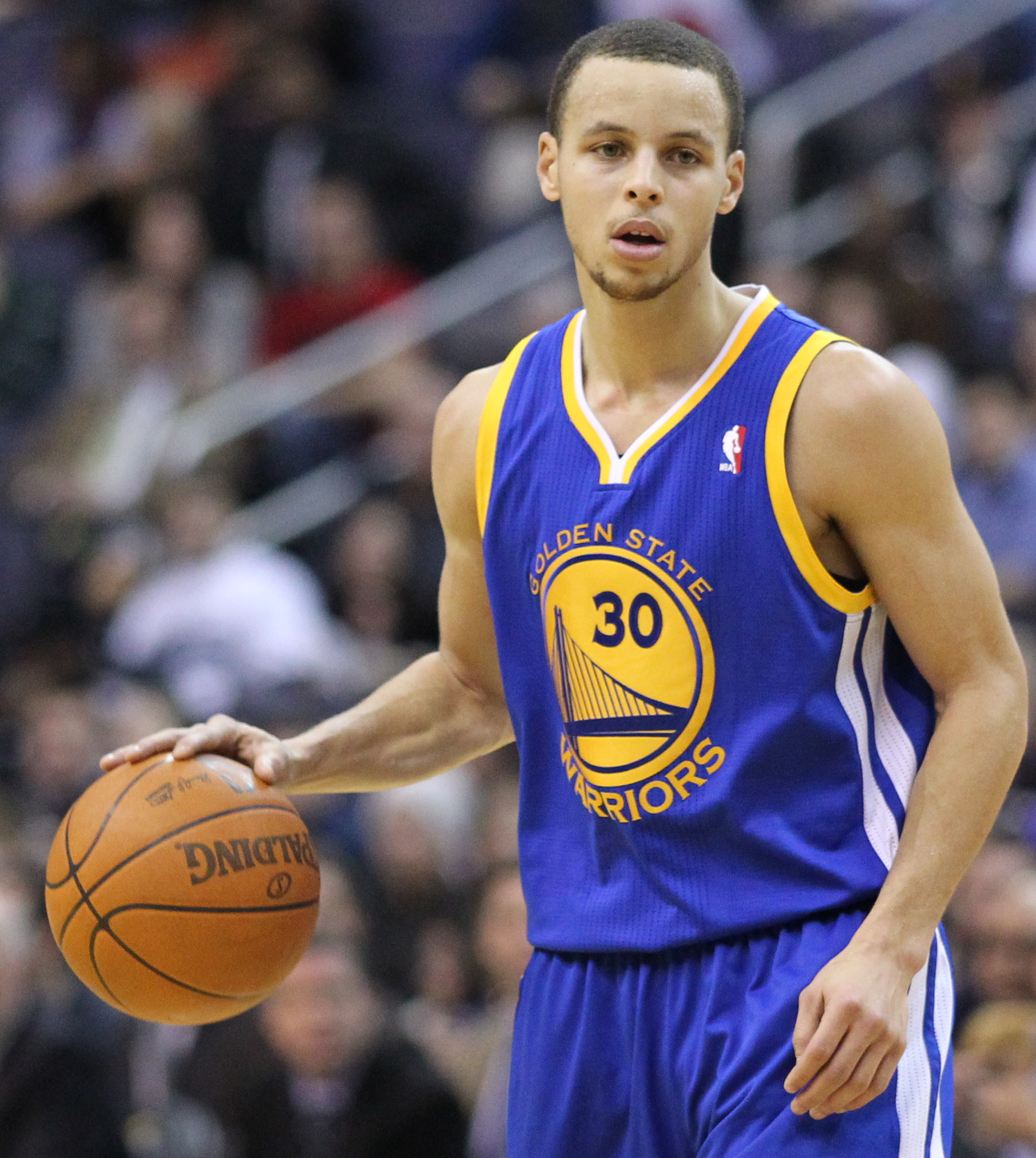
Stephen Curry has the highest free throw percentage in the NBA.

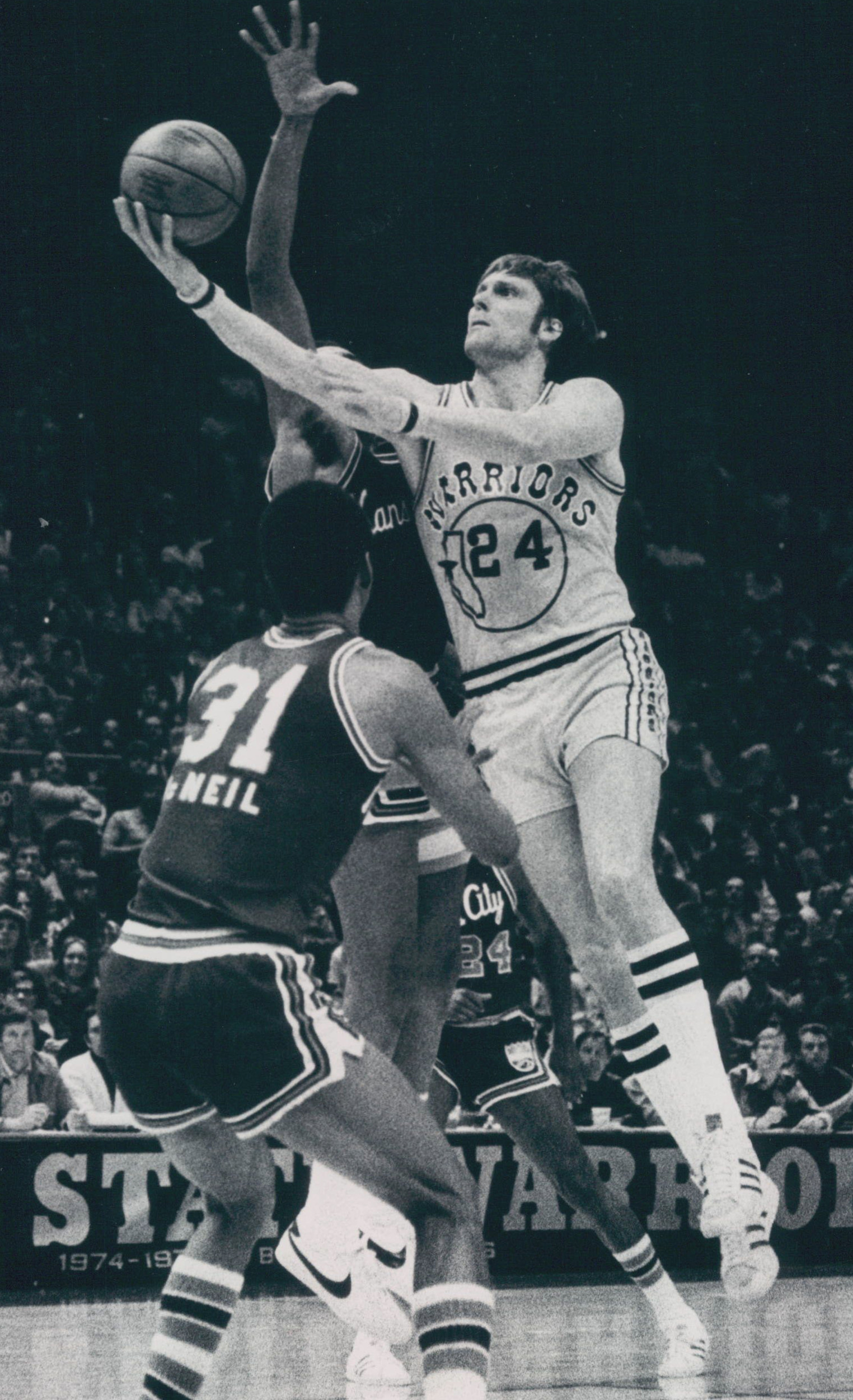
Rick Barry has the highest free throw percentage by a non-guard in NBA history thanks to his mastery of the unorthodox underhand shooting technique.

Statistics accurate as of November 15, 2026.

^	Active NBA player
*	Inducted into the Naismith Memorial Basketball Hall of Fame
†	Not yet eligible for Hall of Fame consideration (Note: A player is not eligible for induction into the Naismith Memorial Basketball Hall of Fame until he has been fully retired for two calendar years.)
§	1st time eligible for Hall of Fame in 2027

Rank	Player	Pos	Team(s) played for (years) (Note: American Basketball Association (ABA) teams other than those admitted into the NBA in 1976 are not included; each year is linked to an article about that particular NBA season.)	Free throws percentage	Free throws made	Free throws attempted
1	Stephen Curry^	PG	Golden State Warriors (2009–present)	.9132	4,311	4,721
2	Steve Nash*	PG	Phoenix Suns (1996–1998, 2004–2012); Dallas Mavericks (1998–2004); Los Angeles Lakers (2012–2014)	.9043	3,060	3,384
3	Mark Price	PG	Cleveland Cavaliers (1986–1995); Washington Bullets (1996); Golden State Warriors (1996–1997); Orlando Magic (1997–1998)	.9039	2,135	2,362
4	Rick Barry*	SF	San Francisco/Golden State Warriors (1965–1967, 1972–1978); Houston Rockets (1978–1980)	.8998	3,818	4,243
5	Damian Lillard^	PG	Portland Trail Blazers (2012–2023, 2026–present); Milwaukee Bucks (2023–2025)	.8989	5,332	5,932
6	Peja Stojaković	SF	Sacramento Kings (1999–2006); Indiana Pacers (2006); New Orleans/Oklahoma City/New Orleans Hornets (2006–2010); Toronto Raptors (2010–2011); Dallas Mavericks (2011)	.8948	2,237	2,500
7	Chauncey Billups*	PG	Boston Celtics (1997–1998); Toronto Raptors (1998); Denver Nuggets (1999, 2008–2011); Minnesota Timberwolves (2000–2002); Detroit Pistons (2002–2008, 2013–2014); New York Knicks (2011); Los Angeles Clippers (2011–2013)	.8940	4,496	5,029
8	Ray Allen*	SG	Milwaukee Bucks (1996–2003); Seattle SuperSonics (2003–2007); Boston Celtics (2007–2012); Miami Heat (2012–2014)	.8939	4,398	4,920
9	JJ Redick	SG	Orlando Magic (2006–2013); Milwaukee Bucks (2013); Los Angeles Clippers (2013–2017); Philadelphia 76ers (2017–2019); New Orleans Pelicans (2019–2021); Dallas Mavericks (2021)	.8918	2,060	2,310
10	Calvin Murphy*	PG/SG	San Diego/Houston Rockets (1970–1983)	.8916	3,445	3,864
11	Scott Skiles	PG	Milwaukee Bucks (1986); Indiana Pacers (1987–1989); Orlando Magic (1989–1994); Washington Bullets (1994–1995); Philadelphia 76ers (1995–1996)	.8891	1,548	1,741
12	Reggie Miller*	SG	Indiana Pacers (1987–2005)	.8877	6,237	7,026
13	Kyrie Irving^	PG	Cleveland Cavaliers (2011–2017); Boston Celtics (2017–2019); Brooklyn Nets (2019–2023); Dallas Mavericks (2023–present)	.8875	3,014	3,396
14	Larry Bird*	SF/PF	Boston Celtics (1979–1992)	.8857	3,960	4,471
15	Bill Sharman*	SG	Washington Capitols (1950–1951); Boston Celtics (1951–1961)	.8831	3,143	3,559
16	Kevin Durant^	SF/PF	Seattle SuperSonics/Oklahoma City Thunder (2007–2016); Golden State Warriors (2016–2019); Brooklyn Nets (2020–2023); Phoenix Suns (2023–2025); Houston Rockets (2025–present)	.8816	7,800	8,848
17	Dirk Nowitzki*	PF	Dallas Mavericks (1999–2019)	.8788	7,240	8,239
18	Jordan Poole^	SG	Golden State Warriors (2019–2023); Washington Wizards (2023–2025); New Orleans Pelicans (2025–present)	.8786	1,375	1,565
19	Khris Middleton^	SF	Detroit Pistons (2012–2013); Milwaukee Bucks (2013–2025); Washington Wizards (2025–2026, 2026–present); Dallas Mavericks (2026)	.8781	2,240	2,551
20	Jeff Hornacek	SG/PG	Phoenix Suns (1986–1992); Philadelphia 76ers (1992–1994); Utah Jazz (1994–2000)	.8770	2,973	3,390
21	Kyle Korver	SG/SF	Philadelphia 76ers (2003–2007); Utah Jazz (2007–2010, 2018–2019); Chicago Bulls (2010–2012); Atlanta Hawks (2012–2017); Cleveland Cavaliers (2017–2018); Milwaukee Bucks (2019–2020)	.8769	1,297	1,479
22	Danilo Gallinari^{§}	SF/PF	New York Knicks (2008–2011); Denver Nuggets (2011–2017); Los Angeles Clippers (2017–2019); Oklahoma City Thunder (2019–2020); Atlanta Hawks (2020–2022); Washington Wizards (2023–2024); Detroit Pistons (2024); Milwaukee Bucks (2024)	.8764	3,077	3,511
23	Earl Boykins	PG/SG	New Jersey Nets (1999); Cleveland Cavaliers (1999, 2000); Orlando Magic (1999); Los Angeles Clippers (2000–2002); Golden State Warriors (2002–2003); Denver Nuggets (2003–2007); Milwaukee Bucks (2007, 2010–2011); Charlotte Bobcats (2008); Washington Wizards (2009–2010); Houston Rockets (2012)	.8758	1,255	1,433
24	Ricky Pierce	SG/PG	Detroit Pistons (1982–1983); San Diego Clippers (1983–1984); Milwaukee Bucks (1985–1991, 1997–1998); Seattle SuperSonics (1991–1994); Golden State Warriors (1994–1995); Indiana Pacers (1995–1996); Denver Nuggets (1996–1997); Charlotte Hornets (1997)	.8755	3,389	3,871
25	Devin Booker^	SG	Phoenix Suns (2015–present)	.8745	4,054	4,636
26	Terrell Brandon	PG	Cleveland Cavaliers (1991–1997); Milwaukee Bucks (1997–1999); Minnesota Timberwolves (1999–2002)	.8732	1,784	2,043
27	Jamal Murray^	PG	Denver Nuggets (2016–present)	.8726	1,774	2,033
28	Isaiah Thomas^{§}	PG	Sacramento Kings (2011–2014); Phoenix Suns (2014–2015, 2024); Boston Celtics (2015–2017); Cleveland Cavaliers (2017–2018); Los Angeles Lakers (2018, 2021); Denver Nuggets (2018–2019); Washington Wizards (2019–2020); New Orleans Pelicans (2021); Dallas Mavericks (2021–2022); Charlotte Hornets (2022)	.8721	2,339	2,682
29	Tyrese Maxey^	PG	Philadelphia 76ers (2020–present)	.8721	1,493	1,712
30	Kiki VanDeWeghe	SF/PF	Denver Nuggets (1980–1984); Portland Trail Blazers (1984–1989); New York Knicks (1989–1992); Los Angeles Clippers (1992–1993)	.8717	3,484	3,997
31	Trae Young^	PG	Atlanta Hawks (2018–2026); Washington Wizards (2026–present)	.8716	3,381	3,879
32	Darrell Armstrong	PG	Orlando Magic (1995–2003); New Orleans Hornets (2003–2004); Dallas Mavericks (2004–2006); Indiana Pacers (2006–2007); New Jersey Nets (2007–2008)	.8713	1,463	1,679
33	Jeff Malone	SG	Washington Bullets (1983–1990); Utah Jazz (1990–1994); Philadelphia 76ers (1994–1995); Miami Heat (1996)	.8711	2,947	3,383
34	Mo Williams	PG/SG	Utah Jazz (2003–2004, 2012–2013); Milwaukee Bucks (2004–2008); Cleveland Cavaliers (2008–2011, 2015–2016); Los Angeles Clippers (2011–2012); Portland Trail Blazers (2013–2014); Minnesota Timberwolves (2014–2015); Charlotte Hornets (2015)	.8708	1,563	1,795
35	Lauri Markkanen^	PF	Chicago Bulls (2017–2021); Cleveland Cavaliers (2021–2022); Utah Jazz (2022–present)	.8707	1,677	1,926
36	Chris Paul^{†}	PG	New Orleans/Oklahoma City/New Orleans Hornets (2005–2011); Los Angeles Clippers (2011–2017, 2025–2026); Houston Rockets (2017–2019); Oklahoma City Thunder (2019–2020); Phoenix Suns (2020–2023); Golden State Warriors (2023–2024); San Antonio Spurs (2024–2025)	.8704	4,858	5,581
37	Kevin Martin	SG/PG	Sacramento Kings (2004–2010); Houston Rockets (2010–2012); Oklahoma City Thunder (2012–2013); Minnesota Timberwolves (2013–2016); San Antonio Spurs (2016)	.8704	3,561	4,091
38	Hersey Hawkins	SG	Philadelphia 76ers (1988–1993); Charlotte Hornets (1993–1995, 2000–2001); Seattle SuperSonics (1995–1999); Chicago Bulls (1999–2000)	.8698	3,466	3,985
39	Mike Newlin	SG	Houston Rockets (1971–1979); New Jersey Nets (1979–1981); New York Knicks (1981–1982)	.8695	3,005	3,456
40	Micheal Williams	PG	Detroit Pistons (1988–1989); Phoenix Suns (1989); Charlotte Hornets (1990); Indiana Pacers (1990–1992); Minnesota Timberwolves (1992–1998); Toronto Raptors (1999)	.8680	1,545	1,780
41	Austin Reaves^	PG	Los Angeles Lakers (2021–present)	.8677	1,279	1,474
42	D. J. Augustin	PG	Charlotte Bobcats (2008–2012); Indiana Pacers (2012–2013); Toronto Raptors (2013); Chicago Bulls (2013–2014); Detroit Pistons (2014–2015); Oklahoma City Thunder (2015–2016); Denver Nuggets (2016); Orlando Magic (2016–2020); Milwaukee Bucks (2020–2021); Houston Rockets (2021–2022); Los Angeles Lakers (2022)	.8671	2,009	2,317
43	Chris Mullin*	SF/SG	Golden State Warriors (1985–1997, 2000–2001); Indiana Pacers (1997–2000)	.8655	3,616	4,178
44	Shai Gilgeous-Alexander^	PG	Los Angeles Clippers (2018–2019); Oklahoma City Thunder (2019–present)	.8644	3,430	3,968
45	Kawhi Leonard^	SF	San Antonio Spurs (2011–2018); Toronto Raptors (2018–2019, 2026–present); Los Angeles Clippers (2019–2026)	.8637	3,224	3,733
46	Allan Houston	SG	Detroit Pistons (1993–1996); New York Knicks (1996–2005)	.8634	2,572	2,979
47	James Harden^	SG/PG	Oklahoma City Thunder (2009–2012); Houston Rockets (2012–2021); Brooklyn Nets (2021–2022); Philadelphia 76ers (2022–2023); Los Angeles Clippers (2023–2026); Cleveland Cavaliers (2026–present)	.8625	8,689	10,074
48	Luke Ridnour	PG/SG	Seattle SuperSonics (2003–2008); Milwaukee Bucks (2008–2010, 2013–2014); Minnesota Timberwolves (2010–2013); Charlotte Bobcats (2014); Orlando Magic (2014–2015)	.8623	1,290	1,496
49	John Long	SG	Detroit Pistons (1978–1986, 1989, 1991); Indiana Pacers (1986–1989); Atlanta Hawks (1990); Toronto Raptors (1996–1997)	.8622	1,814	2,104
50	Jamal Crawford	SG	Chicago Bulls (2000–2004); New York Knicks (2004–2008); Golden State Warriors (2008–2009); Atlanta Hawks (2009–2011); Portland Trail Blazers (2011–2012); Los Angeles Clippers (2012–2017); Minnesota Timberwolves (2017–2018); Phoenix Suns (2018–2019); Brooklyn Nets (2020)	.8619	3,694	4,286

== Progressive list of free throw percentage leaders ==
This is a progressive list of free throw percentage leaders showing how the record has increased through the years.

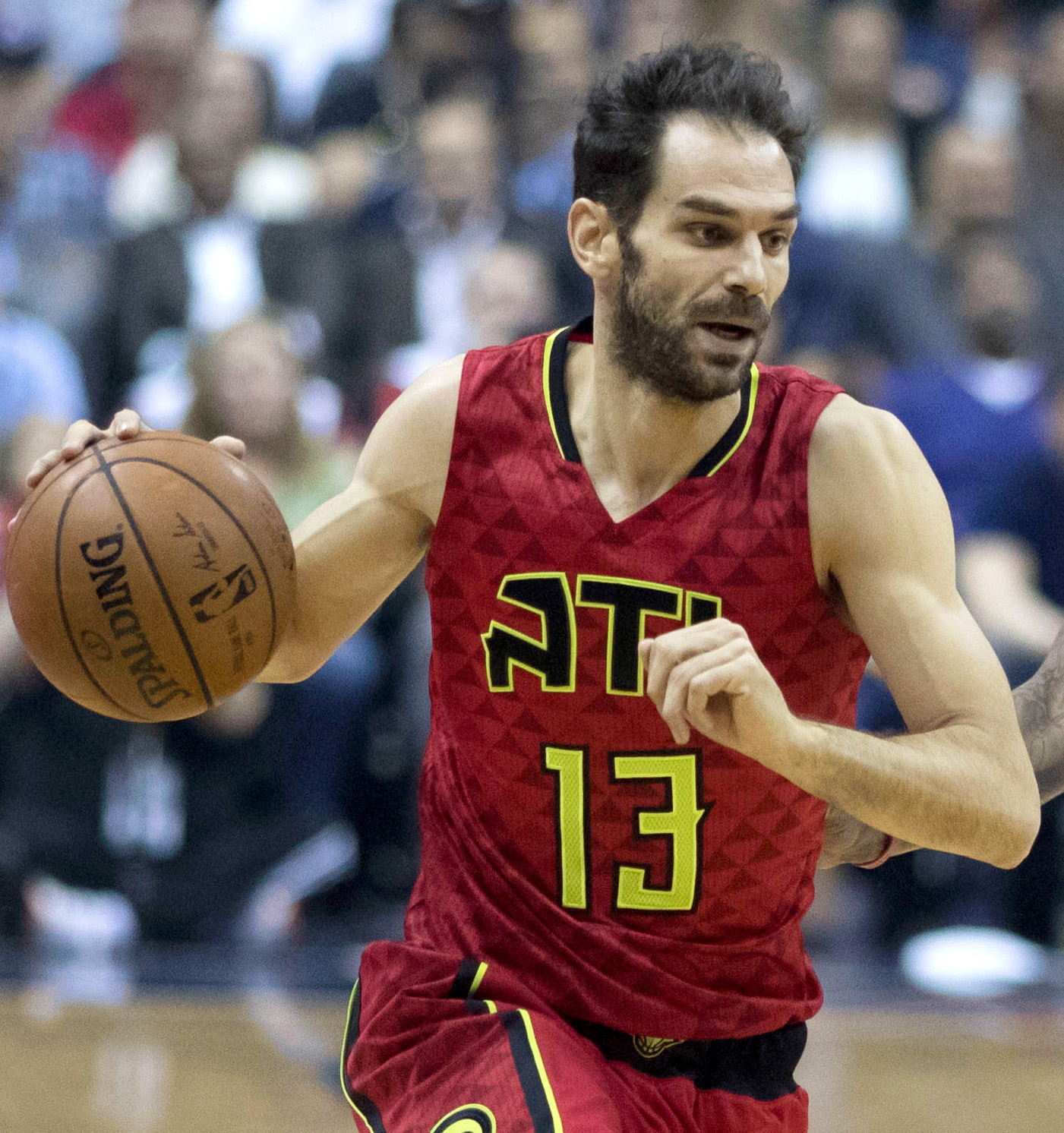
José Calderón has the highest free throw percentage in a single NBA season, making 151 of his 154 attempts during the 2008–09 NBA season for the Toronto Raptors.

Statistics accurate as of November 15, 2026.

^	Active NBA player
*	Inducted into the Naismith Memorial Basketball Hall of Fame
†	Not yet eligible for Hall of Fame consideration

Team AbbreviationsTeam listed is the one player was on when he established the record.
ATL	Atlanta Hawks	DAL	Dallas Mavericks	NOH	New Orleans Hornets	ROC	Rochester Royals
BLB	Baltimore Bullets (1944–1954)	DEN	Denver Nuggets	NOP	New Orleans Pelicans	SAC	Sacramento Kings
BAL	Baltimore Bullets (1963–1973)	FTW	Fort Wayne Pistons	NYK	New York Knicks	SDR	San Diego Rockets
BOS	Boston Celtics	GSW	Golden State Warriors	OKC	Oklahoma City Thunder	SFW	San Francisco Warriors
BUF	Buffalo Braves	HOU	Houston Rockets	ORL	Orlando Magic	SYR	Syracuse Nationals
CHI	Chicago Bulls	IND	Indiana Pacers	PHI	Philadelphia 76ers	TOR	Toronto Raptors
CHS	Chicago Stags	LAL	Los Angeles Lakers	PHW	Philadelphia Warriors	UTA	Utah Jazz
CIN	Cincinnati Royals	MIA	Miami Heat	PHX	Phoenix Suns	WSB	Washington Bullets
CLE	Cleveland Cavaliers	MIL	Milwaukee Bucks	POR	Portland Trail Blazers	WSC	Washington Capitols

Progressive free throw percentage leaders
Season	Year-by-year leader	FT%	Active player leader	FT%	Career record	FT%	Single-season record	FT%	Season
1946–47	Fred ScolariWSC	.8111	N/A		N/A		Fred ScolariWSC	.8111	1946–47
1947–48	Bob FeerickWSC	.7875	N/A		N/A		Fred ScolariWSC	.8111	1947–48
1948–49	Bob FeerickWSC	.8591	Joe Fulks*PHW	.7600	Joe Fulks*PHW	.7600	Bob FeerickWSC	.8591	1948–49
1949–50	Max ZaslofskyCHS	.8425	Joe Fulks*PHW	.7468	Joe Fulks*PHW	.7468	Bob FeerickWSC	.8591	1949–50
1950–51	Joe Fulks*PHW	.8552	Max ZaslofskyNYK	.8015	Max ZaslofskyNYK	.8015	Bob FeerickWSC	.8591	1950–51
1951–52	Bobby Wanzer*ROC	.9041	Fred ScolariBLB	.8155	Fred ScolariBLB	.8155	Bobby Wanzer*ROC	.9041	1951–52
1952–53	Bill Sharman*BOS	.8504	Bobby Wanzer*ROC	.8399	Bobby Wanzer*ROC	.8399	Bobby Wanzer*ROC	.9041	1952–53
1953–54	Bill Sharman*BOS	.8444	Fred SchausFTW & NYK	.8229	Fred SchausFTW & NYK	.8229	Bobby Wanzer*ROC	.9041	1953–54
1954–55	Bill Sharman*BOS	.8966	Bill Sharman*BOS	.8648	Bill Sharman*BOS	.8648	Bobby Wanzer*ROC	.9041	1954–55
1955–56	Bill Sharman*BOS	.8668	Bill Sharman*BOS	.8652	Bill Sharman*BOS	.8652	Bobby Wanzer*ROC	.9041	1955–56
1956–57	Bill Sharman*BOS	.9050	Bill Sharman*BOS	.8724	Bill Sharman*BOS	.8724	Bill Sharman*BOS	.9050	1956–57
1957–58	Dolph Schayes*SYR	.9037	Bill Sharman*BOS	.8750	Bill Sharman*BOS	.8750	Bill Sharman*BOS	.9050	1957–58
1958–59	Bill Sharman*BOS	.9319	Bill Sharman*BOS	.8819	Bill Sharman*BOS	.8819	Bill Sharman*BOS	.9319	1958–59
1959–60	Dolph Schayes*SYR	.8928	Bill Sharman*BOS	.8805	Bill Sharman*BOS	.8805	Bill Sharman*BOS	.9319	1959–60
1960–61	Bill Sharman*BOS	.9211	Bill Sharman*BOS	.8831	Bill Sharman*BOS	.8831	Bill Sharman*BOS	.9319	1960–61
1961–62	Dolph Schayes*SYR	.8965	Dolph Schayes*SYR	.8487	Bill Sharman*BOS	.8831	Bill Sharman*BOS	.9319	1961–62
1962–63	Larry Costello*SYR	.8807	Dolph Schayes*SYR	.8495	Bill Sharman*BOS	.8831	Bill Sharman*BOS	.9319	1962–63
1963–64	Oscar Robertson*CIN	.8529	Dolph Schayes*SYR	.8492	Bill Sharman*BOS	.8831	Bill Sharman*BOS	.9319	1963–64
1964–65	Larry Costello*PHI	.8773	Larry Costello*PHI	.8386	Bill Sharman*BOS	.8831	Bill Sharman*BOS	.9319	1964–65
1965–66	Larry SiegfriedBOS	.8810	Oscar Robertson*CIN	.8288	Bill Sharman*BOS	.8831	Bill Sharman*BOS	.9319	1965–66
1966–67	Adrian SmithCIN	.9026	Rick Barry*SFW	.8743	Bill Sharman*BOS	.8831	Bill Sharman*BOS	.9319	1966–67
1967–68	Oscar Robertson*CIN	.8727	Larry Costello*PHI	.8412	Bill Sharman*BOS	.8831	Bill Sharman*BOS	.9319	1967–68
1968–69	Larry SiegfriedBOS	.8638	Larry Siegfried; BOS 1968–70; SDR 1970–71; HOU 1971; ATL 1971–72	.8545	Bill Sharman*BOS	.8831	Bill Sharman*BOS	.9319	1968–69
1969–70	Flynn RobinsonMIL	.8978	Larry Siegfried; BOS 1968–70; SDR 1970–71; HOU 1971; ATL 1971–72	.8547	Bill Sharman*BOS	.8831	Bill Sharman*BOS	.9319	1969–70
1970–71	Chet Walker*CHI	.8587	Larry Siegfried; BOS 1968–70; SDR 1970–71; HOU 1971; ATL 1971–72	.8543	Bill Sharman*BOS	.8831	Bill Sharman*BOS	.9319	1970–71
1971–72	Jack MarinBAL	.8945	Larry Siegfried; BOS 1968–70; SDR 1970–71; HOU 1971; ATL 1971–72	.8545	Bill Sharman*BOS	.8831	Bill Sharman*BOS	.9319	1971–72
1972–73	Rick Barry*GSW	.9018	Rick Barry*; GSW 1972–78; HOU 1978–80	.8800	Bill Sharman*BOS	.8831	Bill Sharman*BOS	.9319	1972–73
1973–74	Ernie DiGregorioBUF	.9015	Rick Barry*; GSW 1972–78; HOU 1978–80	.8837	Rick Barry*; GSW 1973–78; HOU 1978–80	.8837	Bill Sharman*BOS	.9319	1973–74
1974–75	Rick Barry*GSW	.9037	Rick Barry*; GSW 1972–78; HOU 1978–80	.8868	Rick Barry*; GSW 1973–78; HOU 1978–80	.8868	Bill Sharman*BOS	.9319	1974–75
1975–76	Rick Barry*GSW	.9228	Rick Barry*; GSW 1972–78; HOU 1978–80	.8904	Rick Barry*; GSW 1973–78; HOU 1978–80	.8904	Bill Sharman*BOS	.9319	1975–76
1976–77	Ernie DiGregorioBUF	.9452	Rick Barry*; GSW 1972–78; HOU 1978–80	.8932	Rick Barry*; GSW 1973–78; HOU 1978–80	.8932	Ernie DiGregorioBUF	.9452	1976–77
1977–78	Rick Barry*; GSW 1977–78; HOU 1978–80	.9242	Rick Barry*; GSW 1972–78; HOU 1978–80	.8964	Rick Barry*; GSW 1973–78; HOU 1978–80	.8964	Ernie DiGregorioBUF	.9452	1977–78
1978–79	Rick Barry*; GSW 1977–78; HOU 1978–80	.9467	Rick Barry*; GSW 1972–78; HOU 1978–80	.8985	Rick Barry*; GSW 1973–78; HOU 1978–80	.8985	Rick Barry*HOU	.9467	1978–79
1979–80	Rick Barry*; GSW 1977–78; HOU 1978–80	.9346	Rick Barry*; GSW 1972–78; HOU 1978–80	.8998	Rick Barry*; GSW 1973–78; HOU 1978–80	.8998	Rick Barry*HOU	.9467	1979–80
1980–81	Calvin Murphy*HOU	.9581	Calvin Murphy*HOU	.8898	Rick Barry*; GSW 1973–78; HOU 1978–80	.8998	Calvin Murphy*HOU	.9581	1980–81
1981–82	Kyle MacyPHX	.8994	Calvin Murphy*HOU	.8904	Rick Barry*; GSW 1973–78; HOU 1978–80	.8998	Calvin Murphy*HOU	.9581	1981–82
1982–83	Calvin Murphy*HOU	.9200	Calvin Murphy*HOU	.8916	Rick Barry*; GSW 1973–78; HOU 1978–80	.8998	Calvin Murphy*HOU	.9581	1982–83
1983–84	Larry Bird*BOS	.8884	Larry Bird*BOS	.8584	Rick Barry*; GSW 1973–78; HOU 1978–80	.8998	Calvin Murphy*HOU	.9581	1983–84
1984–85	Kyle MacyPHX	.9071	Kiki VanDeWeghePOR	.8648	Rick Barry*; GSW 1973–78; HOU 1978–80	.8998	Calvin Murphy*HOU	.9581	1984–85
1985–86	Larry Bird*BOS	.8963	Larry Bird*BOS	.8687	Rick Barry*; GSW 1973–78; HOU 1978–80	.8998	Calvin Murphy*HOU	.9581	1985–86
1986–87	Larry Bird*BOS	.9099	Larry Bird*BOS	.8744	Rick Barry*; GSW 1973–78; HOU 1978–80	.8998	Calvin Murphy*HOU	.9581	1986–87
1987–88	Jack Sikma*MIL	.9224	Larry Bird*BOS	.8794	Rick Barry*; GSW 1973–78; HOU 1978–80	.8998	Calvin Murphy*HOU	.9581	1987–88
1988–89	Magic Johnson*LAL	.9112	Larry Bird*BOS	.8797	Rick Barry*; GSW 1973–78; HOU 1978–80	.8998	Calvin Murphy*HOU	.9581	1988–89
1989–90	Larry Bird*BOS	.9300	Larry Bird*BOS	.8839	Rick Barry*; GSW 1973–78; HOU 1978–80	.8998	Calvin Murphy*HOU	.9581	1989–90
1990–91	Reggie Miller*IND	.9183	Larry Bird*BOS	.8842	Rick Barry*; GSW 1973–78; HOU 1978–80	.8998	Calvin Murphy*HOU	.9581	1990–91
1991–92	Mark PriceCLE	.9474	Mark Price; CLE 1991–95; WSB 1995–96; GSW 1996–97; ORL 1997–98	.8995	Rick Barry*; GSW 1973–78; HOU 1978–80	.8998	Calvin Murphy*HOU	.9581	1991–92
1992–93	Mark PriceCLE	.9475	Mark Price; CLE 1991–95; WSB 1995–96; GSW 1996–97; ORL 1997–98	.9084	Mark Price; CLE 1992–95; WSB 1995–96; GSW 1996–97; ORL 1997–98	.9084	Calvin Murphy*HOU	.9581	1992–93
1993–94	Mahmoud Abdul-RaufDEN	.9563	Mark Price; CLE 1991–95; WSB 1995–96; GSW 1996–97; ORL 1997–98	.9055	Mark Price; CLE 1992–95; WSB 1995–96; GSW 1996–97; ORL 1997–98	.9055	Calvin Murphy*HOU	.9581	1993–94
1994–95	Spud WebbSAC	.9339	Mark Price; CLE 1991–95; WSB 1995–96; GSW 1996–97; ORL 1997–98	.9062	Mark Price; CLE 1992–95; WSB 1995–96; GSW 1996–97; ORL 1997–98	.9062	Calvin Murphy*HOU	.9581	1994–95
1995–96	Mahmoud Abdul-RaufDEN	.9299	Mark Price; CLE 1991–95; WSB 1995–96; GSW 1996–97; ORL 1997–98	.9066	Mark Price; CLE 1992–95; WSB 1995–96; GSW 1996–97; ORL 1997–98	.9066	Calvin Murphy*HOU	.9581	1995–96
1996–97	Mark PriceGSW	.9064	Mark Price; CLE 1991–95; WSB 1995–96; GSW 1996–97; ORL 1997–98	.9066	Mark Price; CLE 1992–95; WSB 1995–96; GSW 1996–97; ORL 1997–98	.9066	Calvin Murphy*HOU	.9581	1996–97
1997–98	Chris Mullin*IND	.9390	Mark Price; CLE 1991–95; WSB 1995–96; GSW 1996–97; ORL 1997–98	.9039	Mark Price; CLE 1992–95; WSB 1995–96; GSW 1996–97; ORL 1997–98	.9039	Calvin Murphy*HOU	.9581	1997–98
1998–99	Reggie Miller*IND	.9150	Reggie Miller*IND	.8785	Mark Price; CLE 1992–95; WSB 1995–96; GSW 1996–97; ORL 1997–98	.9039	Calvin Murphy*HOU	.9581	1998–99
1999–00	Jeff HornacekUTA	.9500	Reggie Miller*IND	.8814	Mark Price; CLE 1992–95; WSB 1995–96; GSW 1996–97; ORL 1997–98	.9039	Calvin Murphy*HOU	.9581	1999–00
2000–01	Reggie Miller*IND	.9282	Reggie Miller*IND	.8841	Mark Price; CLE 1992–95; WSB 1995–96; GSW 1996–97; ORL 1997–98	.9039	Calvin Murphy*HOU	.9581	2000–01
2001–02	Reggie Miller*IND	.9108	Reggie Miller*IND	.8854	Mark Price; CLE 1992–95; WSB 1995–96; GSW 1996–97; ORL 1997–98	.9039	Calvin Murphy*HOU	.9581	2001–02
2002–03	Allan HoustonNYK	.9190	Reggie Miller*IND	.8859	Mark Price; CLE 1992–95; WSB 1995–96; GSW 1996–97; ORL 1997–98	.9039	Calvin Murphy*HOU	.9581	2002–03
2003–04	Peja StojakovićSAC	.9271	Steve Nash*; DAL 2003–04; PHX 2004–12; LAL 2012–14	.8928	Mark Price; CLE 1992–95; WSB 1995–96; GSW 1996–97; ORL 1997–98	.9039	Calvin Murphy*HOU	.9581	2003–04
2004–05	Reggie Miller*IND	.9328	Steve Nash*; DAL 2003–04; PHX 2004–12; LAL 2012–14	.8919	Mark Price; CLE 1992–95; WSB 1995–96; GSW 1996–97; ORL 1997–98	.9039	Calvin Murphy*HOU	.9581	2004–05
2005–06	Steve Nash*PHX	.9212	Steve Nash*; DAL 2003–04; PHX 2004–12; LAL 2012–14	.8962	Mark Price; CLE 1992–95; WSB 1995–96; GSW 1996–97; ORL 1997–98	.9039	Calvin Murphy*HOU	.9581	2005–06
2006–07	Kyle KorverPHI	.9139	Steve Nash*; DAL 2003–04; PHX 2004–12; LAL 2012–14	.8965	Mark Price; CLE 1992–95; WSB 1995–96; GSW 1996–97; ORL 1997–98	.9039	Calvin Murphy*HOU	.9581	2006–07
2007–08	Peja StojakovićNOH	.9286	Steve Nash*; DAL 2003–04; PHX 2004–12; LAL 2012–14	.8974	Mark Price; CLE 1992–95; WSB 1995–96; GSW 1996–97; ORL 1997–98	.9039	Calvin Murphy*HOU	.9581	2007–08
2008–09	José CalderónTOR	.9805	Steve Nash*; DAL 2003–04; PHX 2004–12; LAL 2012–14	.9003	Mark Price; CLE 1992–95; WSB 1995–96; GSW 1996–97; ORL 1997–98	.9039	José CalderónTOR	.9805	2008–09
2009–10	Steve Nash*PHX	.9378	Steve Nash*; DAL 2003–04; PHX 2004–12; LAL 2012–14	.9033	Mark Price; CLE 1992–95; WSB 1995–96; GSW 1996–97; ORL 1997–98	.9039	José CalderónTOR	.9805	2009–10
2010–11	Stephen Curry^GSW	.9339	Steve Nash*; DAL 2003–04; PHX 2004–12; LAL 2012–14	.9039	Steve Nash*PHX	.9039	José CalderónTOR	.9805	2010–11
2011–12	Jamal CrawfordPOR	.9272	Steve Nash*; DAL 2003–04; PHX 2004–12; LAL 2012–14	.9035	Mark Price; CLE 1992–95; WSB 1995–96; GSW 1996–97; ORL 1997–98	.9039	José CalderónTOR	.9805	2011–12
2012–13	Kevin Durant^OKC	.9053	Steve Nash*; DAL 2003–04; PHX 2004–12; LAL 2012–14	.9042	Steve Nash*LAL	.9042	José CalderónTOR	.9805	2012–13
2013–14	Brian RobertsNOP	.9398	Steve Nash*; DAL 2003–04; PHX 2004–12; LAL 2012–14	.9043	Steve Nash*LAL	.9043	José CalderónTOR	.9805	2013–14
2014–15	Stephen Curry^GSW	.9140	Stephen Curry^GSW	.9000	Steve Nash*LAL	.9043	José CalderónTOR	.9805	2014–15
2015–16	Stephen Curry^GSW	.9075	Stephen Curry^GSW	.9016	Steve Nash*LAL	.9043	José CalderónTOR	.9805	2015–16
2016–17	CJ McCollum^POR	.9116	Stephen Curry^GSW	.9010	Steve Nash*LAL	.9043	José CalderónTOR	.9805	2016–17
2017–18	Stephen Curry^GSW	.9205	Stephen Curry^GSW	.9033	Steve Nash*LAL	.9043	José CalderónTOR	.9805	2017–18
2018–19	Malcolm BrogdonMIL	.9276	Stephen Curry^GSW	.9047	Stephen Curry^GSW	.9047	José CalderónTOR	.9805	2018–19
2019–20	Brad WanamakerBOS	.9265	Stephen Curry^GSW	.9055	Stephen Curry^GSW	.9055	José CalderónTOR	.9805	2019–20
2020–21	Chris Paul^{†}PHX	.9337	Stephen Curry^GSW	.9069	Stephen Curry^GSW	.9069	José CalderónTOR	.9805	2020–21
2021–22	Jordan Poole^GSW	.9248	Stephen Curry^GSW	.9082	Stephen Curry^GSW	.9082	José CalderónTOR	.9805	2021–22
2022–23	Tyler Herro^MIA	.9341	Stephen Curry^GSW	.9087	Stephen Curry^GSW	.9087	José CalderónTOR	.9805	2022–23
2023–24	Klay Thompson^GSW	.9270	Stephen Curry^GSW	.9098	Stephen Curry^GSW	.9098	José CalderónTOR	.9805	2023–24
2024–25	Stephen Curry^GSW	.9331	Stephen Curry^GSW	.9114	Stephen Curry^GSW	.9114	José CalderónTOR	.9805	2024–25
2025–26	Cam Spencer^MEM	.9403	Stephen Curry^GSW	.9120	Stephen Curry^GSW	.9120	José CalderónTOR	.9805	2025–26
2026–27	Derrick White^BOS	1.000	Stephen Curry^GSW	.9132	Stephen Curry^GSW	.9132	José CalderónTOR	.9805	2026–27
Season	Year-by-year leader	FT%	Active player leader	FT%	Career record	FT%	Single-season record	FT%	Season

== See also ==
- NBA records
- List of NBA annual free throw percentage leaders
- List of NBA career free throw scoring leaders
- List of NBA career 3-point scoring leaders
- List of NBA career 3-point field goal percentage leaders
- List of WNBA career free throw percentage leaders
