= 1991–92 Cleveland Cavaliers season =

NBA professional basketball team season

- Head coach: Lenny Wilkens
- General manager: Wayne Embry
- Owners: Gordon Gund; George Gund III
- Arena: Richfield Coliseum

Results
- Record: 57–25 (.695)
- Place: Division: 2nd (Central); Conference: 3rd (Eastern)
- Playoff finish: Eastern Conference finals (lost to Bulls 2–4)
- Stats at Basketball Reference

Local media
- Television: WOIO; SportsChannel Ohio
- Radio: WWWE

The 1991–92 Cleveland Cavaliers season was the 22nd season for the Cleveland Cavaliers in the National Basketball Association.

== Season summary ==
=== Off-season ===
After missing the NBA playoffs the previous season, the Cavaliers received the eleventh overall pick in the 1991 NBA draft, and selected point guard Terrell Brandon from the University of Oregon. During the off-season, the team signed free agent John Battle.

=== Regular season ===
After two straight seasons of injuries, and with the addition of Brandon and Battle, the Cavaliers struggled losing four of their first five games of the regular season, but later on posted an 11-game winning streak between December and January, and held a 31–14 record at the All-Star break. In March, the team re-signed former Cavaliers forward Mike Sanders; Sanders was previously released by the Indiana Pacers. The Cavaliers finished in second place in the Central Division with a 57–25 record, earning the third seed in the Eastern Conference, and returning to the playoffs after a one-year absence; the team's record was tied with their franchise-high record set in the 1988–89 season.

Brad Daugherty averaged 21.5 points, 10.4 rebounds and 3.6 assists per game, while Mark Price averaged 17.3 points, 7.4 assists and 1.3 steals per game, and also led the Cavaliers with 101 three-point field goals, as both players were named to the All-NBA Third Team. In addition, Larry Nance provided the team with 17.0 points, 8.3 rebounds and 3.0 blocks per game, and was named to the NBA All-Defensive Second Team, while Craig Ehlo contributed 12.3 points and 3.8 assists per game. Off the bench, sixth man Hot Rod Williams provided with 11.9 points, 7.6 rebounds and 2.3 blocks per game, while Battle contributed 10.3 points per game, Brandon averaged 7.4 points and 3.9 assists per game, and was named to the NBA All-Rookie Second Team, Steve Kerr provided with 6.6 points per game, second-year forward Henry James contributed 6.4 points per game, and second-year forward Danny Ferry averaged 5.1 points and 3.1 rebounds per game.

During the NBA All-Star weekend at the Orlando Arena in Orlando, Florida, Daugherty and Price were both selected for the 1992 NBA All-Star Game, as members of the Eastern Conference All-Star team. Meanwhile, Ehlo participated in the NBA Three-Point Shootout, and Brandon was selected to participate in the NBA Slam Dunk Contest, but withdrew due to a sore knee injury. Price also finished in seventh place in Most Valuable Player voting, while Daugherty finished in eleventh place, and head coach Lenny Wilkens finished in fifth place in Coach of the Year voting.

The Cavaliers finished ninth in the NBA in home-game attendance, with an attendance of 677,408 at the Coliseum at Richfield during the regular season.

=== NBA playoffs ===
In the Eastern Conference First Round of the 1992 NBA playoffs, the Cavaliers faced off against the 6th–seeded New Jersey Nets, a team that featured Dražen Petrović, second-year star Derrick Coleman, and Chris Morris. The Cavaliers won the first two games over the Nets at home at the Coliseum at Richfield, before losing Game 3 on the road, 109–104 at the Brendan Byrne Arena. The Cavaliers won Game 4 over the Nets on the road, 98–89 to win the series in four games.

In the Eastern Conference Semi-finals, the team faced off against the 2nd–seeded, and Atlantic Division champion Boston Celtics, who were led by the All-Star quartet of Larry Bird, Reggie Lewis, Robert Parish, and sixth man Kevin McHale. Despite the Celtics winning the Atlantic Division title, the Cavaliers had home-court advantage in the series, since they finished with a better regular-season record. The Cavaliers won Game 1 over the Celtics at the Coliseum at Richfield, 101–76, but then lost the next two games, including a Game 3 loss on the road, 110–107 at the Boston Garden, as the Celtics took a 2–1 series lead. The Cavaliers won the next two games before losing Game 6 to the Celtics, 122–91 at the Boston Garden. With the series tied at 3–3, the Cavaliers won Game 7 over the Celtics at the Coliseum at Richfield, 122–104 to win in a hard-fought seven-game series.

In the Eastern Conference Finals, the Cavaliers then faced off against the top–seeded, and defending NBA champion Chicago Bulls, who won the Central Division title, and were led by the trio of All-Star guard, and Most Valuable Player of the Year, Michael Jordan, All-Star forward Scottie Pippen, and Horace Grant. After losing Game 1 on the road, 103–89 at the Chicago Stadium, the Cavaliers managed to defeat the Bulls on the road in Game 2 by a 26-point margin, 107–81 to even the series. With the series tied at 2–2, the Cavaliers lost the next two games, including a Game 6 home loss to the Bulls at the Coliseum at Richfield, 99–94, thus losing the series in six games.

The Bulls would go on to defeat the Portland Trail Blazers in six games in the 1992 NBA Finals, winning their second consecutive NBA championship.

=== Notable highlights ===
One notable highlight of the regular season occurred on December 17, 1991, in which the Cavaliers set an NBA record by winning with the second largest margin of victory of any game, defeating the Miami Heat at home, 148–80 (68 points), at the Coliseum at Richfield.

=== Aftermath ===
Following the season, James was released to free agency.

== Draft picks ==
Round	Pick	Player	Position	Nationality	School/Club team
1	11	Terrell Brandon	Guard	United States	Oregon
2	39^{*}	Jimmy Oliver	Guard	United States	Purdue

^{*}2nd round pick acquired from New York via Charlotte in Randolph Keys deal.

- 2nd round pick (#38) traded to Los Angeles Clippers in Danny Ferry deal. Used to draft Joe Wylie.
- 2nd round pick (#51) traded to New Jersey in Chris Dudley deal, then to Boston and Houston. Used to draft Žan Tabak.

== Roster ==
1991–92 Cleveland Cavaliers roster
Players

Pos.	No.	Player	Height	Weight	DOB	From
SG	10	John Battle	6 ft 2 in (1.88 m)	175 lb (79 kg)	1962–11–09	Rutgers
PG	11	Terrell Brandon	5 ft 11 in (1.80 m)	180 lb (82 kg)	1970–05–20	Oregon
C	43	Brad Daugherty	7 ft 0 in (2.13 m)	245 lb (111 kg)	1965–10–19	North Carolina
SG	3	Craig Ehlo	6 ft 6 in (1.98 m)	180 lb (82 kg)	1961–08–11	Washington State
PF	35	Danny Ferry	6 ft 10 in (2.08 m)	230 lb (104 kg)	1966–10–17	Duke
SF	32	Henry James	6 ft 8 in (2.03 m)	220 lb (100 kg)	1965–07–29	Saint Mary's
PG	4	Steve Kerr	6 ft 3 in (1.91 m)	175 lb (79 kg)	1965–09–27	Arizona
PF	22	Larry Nance	6 ft 10 in (2.08 m)	205 lb (93 kg)	1959–02–12	Clemson
SG	24	Jimmy Oliver	6 ft 5 in (1.96 m)	205 lb (93 kg)	1969–07–12	Purdue
SG	14	Bobby Phills	6 ft 5 in (1.96 m)	210 lb (95 kg)	1969–12–20	Southern
PG	25	Mark Price	6 ft 0 in (1.83 m)	170 lb (77 kg)	1964–02–15	Georgia Tech
SF	33	Mike Sanders	6 ft 6 in (1.98 m)	210 lb (95 kg)	1960–05–07	UCLA
C	18	Hot Rod Williams	6 ft 11 in (2.11 m)	215 lb (98 kg)	1962–08–09	Tulane

Coaches
Head coach
- Lenny Wilkens
Assistant(s)
- Dick Helm
- Brian Winters

Legend
- (DP) Unsigned draft pick
- (FA) Free agent
- (S) Suspended
- Injured

Roster
Updated: March 29, 1992

== Regular season ==
=== Season standings ===
Central Division	W	L	PCT	GB	Home	Road	Div
y-Chicago Bulls	67	15	.817	—	36–5	31–10	22–6
x-Cleveland Cavaliers	57	25	.695	10	35–6	22–19	21–7
x-Detroit Pistons	48	34	.585	19	25–16	23–18	15–13
x-Indiana Pacers	40	42	.488	27	26–15	14–27	13–15
Atlanta Hawks	38	44	.463	29	23–18	15–26	7–21
Milwaukee Bucks	31	51	.378	36	25–16	6–35	10–18
Charlotte Hornets	31	51	.378	36	22–19	9–32	10–18

y – clinched division title
x – clinched playoff spot

#	Eastern Conference				
#	Team	W	L	PCT	GB
1	z-Chicago Bulls	67	15	.817	–
2	y-Boston Celtics	51	31	.622	16
3	x-Cleveland Cavaliers	57	25	.695	10
4	x-New York Knicks	51	31	.622	16
5	x-Detroit Pistons	48	34	.585	19
6	x-New Jersey Nets	40	42	.488	27
7	x-Indiana Pacers	40	42	.488	27
8	x-Miami Heat	38	44	.463	29
9	Atlanta Hawks	38	44	.463	29
10	Philadelphia 76ers	35	47	.427	32
11	Milwaukee Bucks	31	51	.378	36
12	Charlotte Hornets	31	51	.378	36
13	Washington Bullets	25	57	.305	42
14	Orlando Magic	21	61	.256	46

z – clinched division title
y – clinched division title
x – clinched playoff spot

=== Game log ===
1991–92 game log
Total: 57–25 (home: 35–6; road: 22–19)
November: 9–5 (home: 7–0; road: 2–5)

Game	Date	Team	Score	High points	High rebounds	High assists	Location Attendance	Record
1	November 1, 1991	@ Portland	L 106–117				Memorial Coliseum	0–1
2	November 2, 1991	@ L.A. Clippers						
3	November 5, 1991	@ Dallas						
4	November 7, 1991	@ Houston						
5	November 8, 1991	@ San Antonio						
6	November 12, 1991	Milwaukee						
7	November 14, 1991	Seattle						
8	November 16, 1991	Indiana						
9	November 20, 1991	@ Charlotte						
10	November 21, 1991	New Jersey						
11	November 23, 1991	Detroit						
12	November 26, 1991	@ Philadelphia						
13	November 27, 1991	Philadelphia						
14	November 29, 1991	Orlando						

December: 10–4 (home: 7–1; road: 3–3)

Game	Date	Team	Score	High points	High rebounds	High assists	Location Attendance	Record
15	December 4, 1991	@ Chicago	L 102–108				Chicago Stadium	9–6
16	December 5, 1991	@ Detroit						
17	December 7, 1991	Washington						
18	December 11, 1991	@ Miami						
19	December 12, 1991; 7:30 pm EST	Atlanta	W 134–107	Nance (26)	Daugherty (15)	Brandon, Price (7)	Richfield Coliseum; 11,429	12–7
20	December 14, 1991	Dallas						
21	December 17, 1991	Miami						
22	December 18, 1991	@ New Jersey						
23	December 20, 1991; 7:30 pm EST	@ Atlanta	W 122–99	Brandon (19)	Daugherty (10)	Brandon, Daugherty (7)	The Omni; 10,384	14–9
24	December 21, 1991	Charlotte						
25	December 23, 1991	Utah						
26	December 26, 1991	@ Milwaukee						
27	December 27, 1991	San Antonio						
28	December 30, 1991	Houston						

January: 10–4 (home: 4–3; road: 6–1)

Game	Date	Team	Score	High points	High rebounds	High assists	Location Attendance	Record
29	January 2, 1992	@ New York						
30	January 3, 1992	@ Boston						
31	January 7, 1992	@ Minnesota						
32	January 9, 1992	@ Washington						
33	January 11, 1992	Philadelphia						
34	January 14, 1992	Portland	L 114–121				Richfield Coliseum	24–10
35	January 16, 1992	Chicago	L 85–100				Richfield Coliseum	24–11
36	January 18, 1992	New York						
37	January 20, 1992	Boston						
38	January 22, 1992	Indiana						
39	January 24, 1992	@ Indiana						
40	January 25, 1992	@ Orlando						
41	January 29, 1992	@ Detroit						
42	January 30, 1992	Orlando						

February: 8–5 (home: 4–1; road: 4–4)

Game	Date	Team	Score	High points	High rebounds	High assists	Location Attendance	Record
43	February 2, 1992	Minnesota						
44	February 5, 1992	@ Philadelphia						
45	February 6, 1992	Detroit						
All-Star Break
46	February 11, 1992	@ Utah						
47	February 12, 1992	@ Denver						
48	February 15, 1992	New Jersey						
49	February 17, 1992	@ Chicago	W 113–112				Chicago Stadium	33–16
50	February 18, 1992	@ Milwaukee						
51	February 20, 1992	@ New York						
52	February 21, 1992	Sacramento						
53	February 23, 1992	Milwaukee						
54	February 26, 1992	@ Phoenix						
55	February 28, 1992	@ L.A. Lakers						

March: 12–4 (home: 7–0; road: 5–4)

Game	Date	Team	Score	High points	High rebounds	High assists	Location Attendance	Record
56	March 1, 1992	@ Seattle						
57	March 4, 1992	@ Sacramento						
58	March 5, 1992	@ Golden State						
59	March 7, 1992; 7:30 pm EST	@ Atlanta	W 110–94	Nance (35)	Nance (12)	Price (8)	The Omni; 13,950	44–21
60	March 10, 1992	Phoenix						
61	March 13, 1992	L.A. Lakers						
62	March 15, 1992	Denver						
63	March 16, 1992	@ Washington						
64	March 18, 1992	@ Boston						
65	March 20, 1992	Golden State						
66	March 22, 1992; 12 Noon EST	Atlanta	W 123–80	Daugherty (22)	Ferry (16)	Brandon (13)	Richfield Coliseum; 15,406	45–21
67	March 24, 1992	Indiana						
68	March 25, 1992	@ Orlando						
69	March 27, 1992	@ Charlotte						
70	March 28, 1992	@ Chicago	L 102–126				Chicago Stadium	48–22
71	March 31, 1992	Miami						

April: 8–3 (home: 6–1; road: 2–2)

Game	Date	Team	Score	High points	High rebounds	High assists	Location Attendance	Record
72	April 2, 1992	L.A. Clippers						
73	April 3, 1992	@ Miami						
74	April 5, 1992	New York						
75	April 7, 1992	Boston						
76	April 9, 1992	Charlotte						
77	April 10, 1992	@ New Jersey						
78	April 12, 1992	Washington						
79	April 14, 1992	Chicago	W 115–100				Richfield Coliseum	55–24
80	April 15, 1992	@ Charlotte						
81	April 17, 1992	@ Indiana						
82	April 19, 1992; 7:30 pm EDT	Atlanta	W 112–108	Price (22)	Nance (12)	Price (6)	Richfield Coliseum; 17,296	57–25

1991–92 schedule

== Playoffs ==
1992 playoff game log
Eastern Conference First Round: 3–1 (home: 2–0; road: 1–1)

Game	Date	Team	Score	High points	High rebounds	High assists	Location Attendance	Series
1	April 23	New Jersey	W 120–113	Brad Daugherty (40)	Brad Daugherty (16)	Mark Price (10)	Richfield Coliseum; 16,512	1–0
2	April 25	New Jersey	W 118–96	Brad Daugherty (29)	Hot Rod Williams (9)	Mark Price (15)	Richfield Coliseum; 20,273	2–0
3	April 28	@ New Jersey	L 104–109	Larry Nance (28)	Larry Nance (14)	Mark Price (12)	Brendan Byrne Arena; 15,258	2–1
4	April 30	@ New Jersey	W 98–89	Hot Rod Williams (20)	Brad Daugherty (14)	Craig Ehlo (7)	Brendan Byrne Arena; 13,071	3–1

Conference Semifinals: 4–3 (home: 3–1; road: 1–2)

Game	Date	Team	Score	High points	High rebounds	High assists	Location Attendance	Series
1	May 2	Boston	W 101–76	Brad Daugherty (26)	Brad Daugherty (17)	Mark Price (7)	Richfield Coliseum; 17,496	1–0
2	May 4	Boston	L 98–104	Brad Daugherty (22)	three players tied (9)	Mark Price (8)	Richfield Coliseum; 20,273	1–1
3	May 8	@ Boston	L 107–110	Mark Price (27)	Larry Nance (12)	Mark Price (10)	Boston Garden; 14,890	1–2
4	May 10	@ Boston	W 114–112 (OT)	Larry Nance (32)	Craig Ehlo (9)	Mark Price (12)	Boston Garden; 14,890	2–2
5	May 13	Boston	W 114–98	Brad Daugherty (28)	Brad Daugherty (9)	Craig Ehlo (13)	Richfield Coliseum; 20,273	3–2
6	May 15	@ Boston	L 91–122	Hot Rod Williams (18)	Hot Rod Williams (11)	Mark Price (5)	Boston Garden; 14,890	3–3
7	May 17	Boston	W 122–104	Brad Daugherty (28)	Nance, Daugherty (9)	Nance, Price (8)	Richfield Coliseum; 20,273	4–3

Conference Finals: 2–4 (home: 1–2; road: 1–2)

Game	Date	Team	Score	High points	High rebounds	High assists	Location Attendance	Series
1	May 19	@ Chicago	L 89–103	Brad Daugherty (23)	Larry Nance (12)	Mark Price (9)	Chicago Stadium; 18,676	0–1
2	May 21	@ Chicago	W 107–81	Brad Daugherty (28)	Brad Daugherty (9)	Ehlo, Price (7)	Chicago Stadium; 18,676	1–1
3	May 23	Chicago	L 96–105	Craig Ehlo (20)	Brad Daugherty (10)	Daugherty, Ehlo (5)	Richfield Coliseum; 20,273	1–2
4	May 25	Chicago	W 99–85	Larry Nance (22)	Brad Daugherty (14)	Brad Daugherty (6)	Richfield Coliseum; 20,273	2–2
5	May 27	@ Chicago	L 89–112	Mark Price (24)	Hot Rod Williams (11)	Ehlo, Price (3)	Chicago Stadium; 18,676	2–3
6	May 29	Chicago	L 94–99	Larry Nance (25)	Larry Nance (16)	Mark Price (8)	Richfield Coliseum; 20,273	2–4

1992 schedule

== Player statistics ==
Legend
GP	Games played	GS	Games started	MPG	Minutes per game
FG%	Field-goal percentage	3P%	3-point field-goal percentage	FT%	Free-throw percentage
RPG	Rebounds per game	APG	Assists per game	SPG	Steals per game
BPG	Blocks per game	PPG	Points per game

=== Season ===
Player	GP	GS	MPG	FG%	3P%	FT%	RPG	APG	SPG	BPG	PPG
John Battle	76	2	21.5	.480	.118	.848	1.5	2.1	.5	.1	10.3
Winston Bennett^{†}	52	45	16.0	.378	.000	.700	3.1	.7	.4	.2	3.7
Terrell Brandon	82	9	19.6	.419	.043	.806	2.0	3.9	1.0	.3	7.4
Chucky Brown^{†}	6	0	8.3	.500		.625	1.0	.5	.5	.0	2.5
Brad Daugherty	73	73	36.2	.570	.000	.777	10.4	3.6	.9	1.1	21.5
Craig Ehlo	63	62	32.0	.453	.413	.707	4.9	3.8	1.2	.3	12.3
Danny Ferry	68	1	13.8	.409	.354	.836	3.1	1.1	.3	.2	5.1
Henry James	65	5	13.3	.407	.322	.803	1.7	.4	.2	.2	6.4
Steve Kerr	48	20	17.6	.511	.432	.833	1.6	2.3	.6	.2	6.6
John Morton^{†}	4	0	13.5	.250	.000	.889	1.8	1.3	.3	.0	3.5
Larry Nance	81	81	35.6	.539	.000	.822	8.3	2.9	1.0	3.0	17.0
Jimmy Oliver	27	8	9.3	.398	.111	.773	1.0	.7	.3	.1	3.6
Bobby Phills	10	0	6.5	.429	.000	.636	.8	.4	.3	.1	3.1
Mark Price	72	72	29.7	.488	.387	.947	2.4	7.4	1.3	.2	17.3
Mike Sanders^{†}	21	20	26.3	.583	.333	.756	4.2	2.0	1.0	.4	9.2
John Williams	80	12	30.4	.503	.000	.752	7.6	2.5	.8	2.3	11.9

=== Playoffs ===
Player	GP	GS	MPG	FG%	3P%	FT%	RPG	APG	SPG	BPG	PPG
John Battle	15	0	13.5	.415	.000	.913	.8	1.0	.3	.1	5.9
Terrell Brandon	12	0	13.1	.400	.000	.750	1.8	2.5	.3	.1	3.9
Brad Daugherty	17	17	40.4	.528	.000	.814	10.2	3.4	.6	1.0	21.5
Craig Ehlo	17	14	32.5	.414	.412	.762	4.5	4.5	1.2	.3	9.6
Danny Ferry	9	0	6.1	.467	.333	1.000	1.8	.1	.1	.1	2.1
Henry James	8	0	2.8	.100	.000	.500	.3	.3	.1	.0	.5
Steve Kerr	12	3	12.4	.439	.273	1.000	.5	.8	.4	.0	3.7
Larry Nance	17	17	40.1	.494	.000	.829	9.2	2.5	.8	2.7	18.0
Bobby Phills	5	0	2.4	.444	.000	.750	1.2	1.0	.2	.0	2.2
Mark Price	17	17	35.5	.496	.362	.904	2.5	7.5	1.4	.2	19.2
Mike Sanders	17	17	24.6	.487	.333	.810	3.2	2.2	.9	.7	7.6
John Williams	17	0	33.4	.545		.798	7.6	2.5	1.4	1.0	15.0

Player statistics citation:

== Awards and records ==
- Wayne Embry, NBA Executive of the Year Award
- Mark Price, All-NBA Third Team
- Brad Daugherty, All-NBA Third Team
- Larry Nance, NBA All-Defensive Second Team
- Terrell Brandon, NBA All-Rookie Team 2nd Team
