= Danny Ferry =

American basketball player and executive (born 1966)

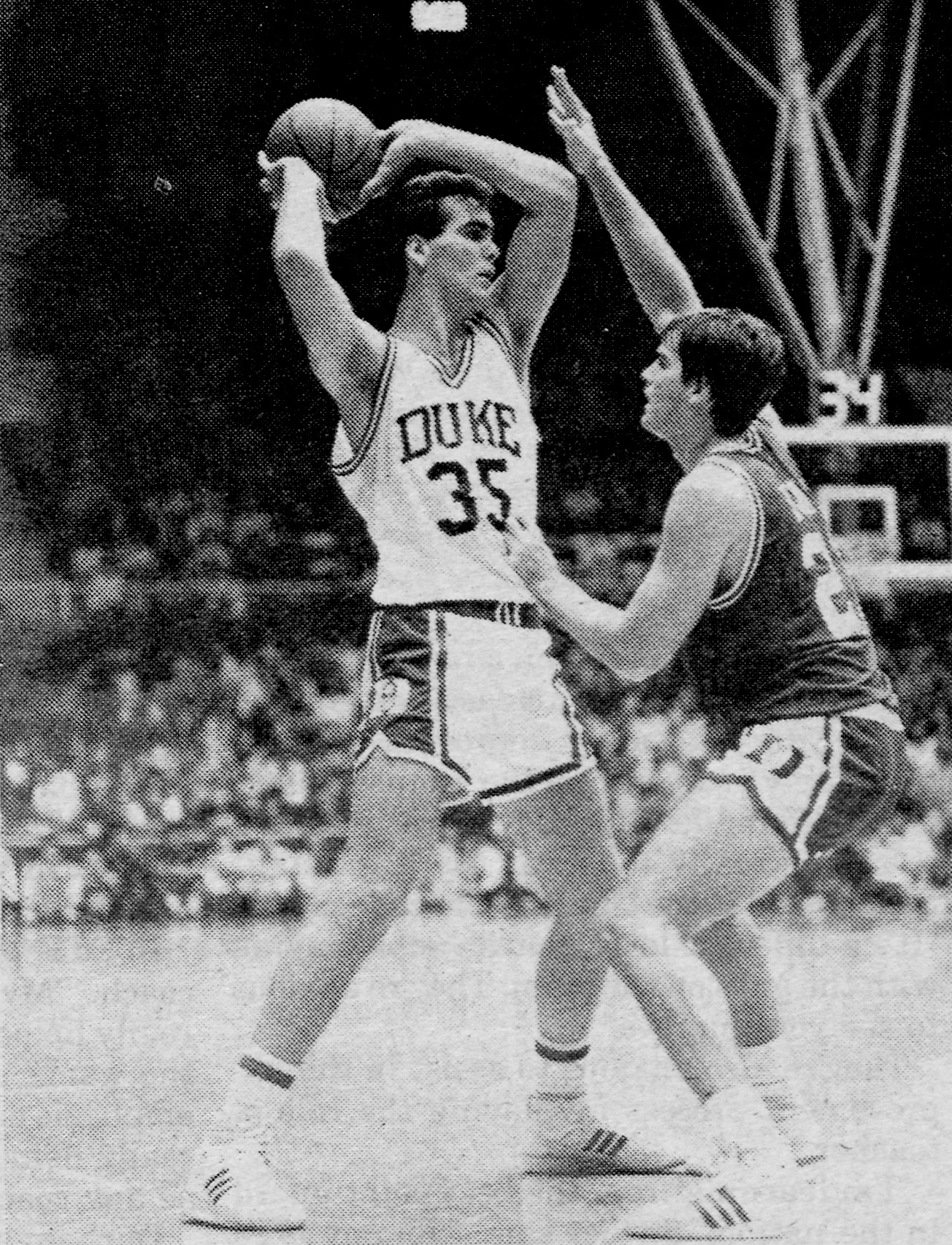
- Ferry playing for Duke, circa 1985

Personal information
- Born: October 17, 1966 (age 60) Hyattsville, Maryland, U.S.
- Listed height: 6 ft 10 in (2.08 m)
- Listed weight: 235 lb (107 kg)

Career information
- High school: DeMatha Catholic (Hyattsville, Maryland)
- College: Duke (1985–1989)
- NBA draft: 1989: 1st round, 2nd overall pick
- Drafted by: Los Angeles Clippers
- Playing career: 1989–2003
- Position: Power forward / small forward
- Number: 35

Career history
- 1989–1990: Il Messaggero Roma
- 1990–2000: Cleveland Cavaliers
- 2000–2003: San Antonio Spurs

Career highlights
- NBA champion (2003); Naismith College Player of the Year (1989); USBWA Player of the Year (1989); UPI College Player of the Year (1989); Consensus first-team All-American (1989); Consensus second-team All-American (1988); 2× ACC Player of the Year (1988, 1989); 2× First-team All-ACC (1988, 1989); Second-team All-ACC (1987); 2× ACC Athlete of the Year (1988, 1989); No. 35 retired by Duke Blue Devils; National high school player of the year (1985); McDonald's All-American (1985); First-team Parade All-American (1985); Second-team Parade All-American (1984)

Career NBA statistics
- Points: 6,439 (7.0 ppg)
- Rebounds: 2,550 (2.8 rpg)
- Assists: 1,185 (1.3 apg)
- Stats at NBA.com
- Stats at Basketball Reference
Medals
Men's basketball
Representing United States
Summer Universiade
Silver medal – second place	1987 Zagreb	National team

Daniel John Willard Ferry (born October 17, 1966) is an American executive and former professional basketball player who played the forward position.

Considered one of the most celebrated basketball players in the United States from the high school graduating class of 1985, Ferry chose to attend Duke University. Ferry led the Duke Blue Devils to three Final Four appearances while setting many school records and earning several national player of the year awards. In 2002, Ferry was named to the Atlantic Coast Conference (ACC) 50th Anniversary men's basketball team honoring the fifty greatest players in conference history.

Drafted into the NBA in 1989 as the second overall pick, Ferry played one season for Italian league's Il Messaggero (now Virtus Roma) after refusing to play for the Los Angeles Clippers. He went on to spend the majority of his career with the Cleveland Cavaliers, where he played from 1990 to 2000. In the NBA, Ferry was a role player known for his three-point shooting. Ferry finished his playing career with the San Antonio Spurs, winning an NBA championship in the 2002–03 season before retiring.

After Ferry's playing career ended, he became an executive. Ferry has served as vice president of basketball operations for the San Antonio Spurs and as general manager of the Atlanta Hawks and the Cleveland Cavaliers. He was hired as a consultant to the Spurs in 2020.

== Early life and family ==
Ferry was born in Hyattsville, Maryland to former NBA center and NBA executive Bob Ferry and his wife, Rita Ferry. Ferry is of Irish descent; his great-great-grandfather, Peter Ferry, was born in Ireland in 1828 and emigrated to St. Louis, Missouri. The younger Ferry began his basketball career in earnest at DeMatha Catholic High School in Maryland where he excelled at the high school level under Morgan Wootten. The two-time All-American was ranked as one of the country's top high school basketball centers while at DeMatha and earned Parade Magazine's prep Player of the Year in 1985. Ferry was one of the most highly recruited high school seniors in the nation before committing to Duke University.

Ferry and his wife, Tiffany, have five children.

== College career ==
Ferry attended Duke University and played basketball for the school over four seasons from 1985 to 1989. During his college career, he helped lead the Blue Devils to the Final Four in 1986, 1988 and 1989, twice winning the MVP award for the East Regional. Known for his outside shooting, rebounding abilities, and full-court vision, Ferry was selected to the first team All-America in 1989 and second-team All-America in 1988. As of 2024, Ferry still held Duke's all-time single game scoring record, having scored 58 points against Miami (FL) on December 10, 1988. He has been described as one of Duke's greatest players of all time. Ferry became the first player in Atlantic Coast Conference (ACC) history to collect more than 2,000 points, 1,000 rebounds and 500 assists in his collegiate career. He left Duke with several national player of the year awards under his belt, including the Naismith College Player of the Year, USBWA College Player of the Year (Oscar Robertson Trophy) and the UPI player of the year awards. Ferry's number 35 was retired in 1989 at the end of his senior season. In 2002, Ferry was named to the ACC 50th Anniversary men's basketball team honoring the fifty greatest players in ACC history.

== Professional career ==
=== Italy ===
After college, Ferry was drafted by the Los Angeles Clippers in the first round (second overall pick) of the 1989 NBA draft. He did not want to play with the Clippers; instead, he accepted an offer to play for the Italian league's Il Messaggero (now Virtus Roma). Ferry averaged 23 points per game during the 1989–90 season, leading the Italian club into the playoffs. The Clippers traded Ferry's rights on November 16, 1989, along with Reggie Williams, to the Cleveland Cavaliers in exchange for guard Ron Harper, two first-round draft picks and a second-round pick.

=== Cleveland Cavaliers ===
In the summer of 1990, the Cavaliers signed Ferry to a 10-year guaranteed contract for $34 million. Ferry struggled with knee problems in the 1990–91 season. He never lived up to the expectations created by his collegiate success and his large contract, and he was considered a draft bust. While Ferry became a reliable role player in the NBA who was known for his three-point shooting, he did not become a regular starter for the Cavaliers until 1996. In the 1995–96 NBA season, Ferry averaged 13.3 points per game. He had only one other season in his career (1996–1997) in which he averaged more than 10 points per game. During Ferry's 10 years in Cleveland, the team made the NBA playoffs six times. Ferry became the team's all-time leader in games played (723 games) before Žydrūnas Ilgauskas surpassed his record on December 2, 2009.

=== San Antonio Spurs ===
Ferry signed a one-year, $1 million contract with the San Antonio Spurs as a free agent on August 10, 2000. Ferry played for San Antonio for three seasons, amassing a three-point field goal percentage of 42.5%. He won an NBA championship with the Spurs in the 2002–03 season before being traded to the Indiana Pacers in a three-team trade involving the Sacramento Kings. Ferry was waived by the Pacers and he retired in 2003 with a career average of 7.0 points per game. Over the course of his career, Ferry shot 39.3% from three-point range.

== Management career ==
From 2003 to 2005, Ferry worked in the Spurs' front office.

On June 27, 2005, Ferry became the Cavaliers' eighth general manager. Ferry began his management tenure with the Cavaliers overseeing a series of less-than-optimal transactions. Nonetheless, the team flourished with superstar LeBron James and newly installed head coach Mike Brown at the helm as the team made a series of serious postseason runs beginning in 2006. Ferry, Brown, and Cavaliers majority owner Dan Gilbert began to add talent and depth to the Cavs' roster, notably acquiring one-time All-Star guard Mo Williams, former All-Star center Shaquille O'Neal, starting shooting guard Anthony Parker, forward Leon Powe, and former All-Star Antawn Jamison between 2008 and 2010. The Cavaliers reached the NBA Finals for the first time in 2007.

On June 4, 2010, it was announced that Ferry and the Cavaliers had come to a mutual agreement to part ways. The Cavaliers went 272–138 during Ferry's tenure. In August 2010, Ferry returned to the Spurs as vice president of basketball operations.

On June 25, 2012, Ferry accepted a position as president of basketball operations and general manager for the Atlanta Hawks. In June 2014, Ferry read aloud verbatim an "offensive and racist comment" written in a scouting report during a conference call about Miami Heat player Luol Deng. Hawks co-owner Michael Gearon Jr. called for him to resign or be dismissed. On September 9, Hawks CEO Steve Koonin announced that the team had decided not to dismiss Ferry and that they were instead going to discipline him. A few days later, Ferry asked to take—and was approved for—an immediate, indefinite leave of absence. In June 2015, an independent investigation reported that Ferry's actions were not motivated by racism. According to UPI, "[the] investigation, which included 19 witness interviews and reviewed the contents of more than 24,000 emails, made clear that the offensive language was not Ferry's and none of Ferry's remarks or behavior during the call were motivated by racial or ethnic animus, or by a person's country of origin. To the contrary, the investigation found Ferry shared his own opinion of Deng, recommended him both personally and professionally and ultimately tried to sign him to the team." Following the release of the investigation results, Ferry reached a buyout agreement with the Hawks.

Ferry became a special advisor to the general manager of the New Orleans Pelicans in June 2016. After the firing of general manager Dell Demps on February 15, 2019, Ferry was named the team's interim general manager. He held that role for the rest of the season before being removed from his position on April 17 with the hiring of David Griffin as Executive Vice President of Basketball Operations.

Ferry was hired as a consultant to the Spurs in 2020.

== NBA career statistics ==
Legend
GP	Games played	GS	Games started	MPG	Minutes per game
FG%	Field goal percentage	3P%	3-point field goal percentage	FT%	Free throw percentage
RPG	Rebounds per game	APG	Assists per game	SPG	Steals per game
BPG	Blocks per game	PPG	Points per game	**Bold**	Career high
†	Won an NBA championship	*	Led the league

=== Regular season ===
Year	Team	GP	GS	MPG	FG%	3P%	FT%	RPG	APG	SPG	BPG	PPG
1990–91	Cleveland	81	2	20.5	.428	.299	.816	3.5	1.8	.5	.3	8.6
1991–92	Cleveland	68	1	13.8	.409	.354	.836	3.1	1.1	.3	.2	5.1
1992–93	Cleveland	76	1	19.2	.479	.415	.876	3.7	1.8	.4	**.6**	7.5
1993–94	Cleveland	70	1	13.8	.446	.275	.884	2.0	1.1	.4	.3	5.0
1994–95	Cleveland	**82***	6	15.7	.446	.403	.881	1.7	1.2	.3	.3	7.5
1995–96	Cleveland	**82**	**79**	**32.7**	.459	.394	.769	3.8	**2.3**	**.7**	.5	**13.3**
1996–97	Cleveland	**82**	48	32.1	.429	.401	.851	**4.1**	1.8	**.7**	.4	10.6
1997–98	Cleveland	69	3	15.0	.395	.333	.800	1.7	.9	.4	.2	4.2
1998–99	Cleveland	50*	10	21.2	.476	.333	.879	2.0	1.1	.5	.2	7.0
1999–00	Cleveland	63	3	21.0	**.497**	.440	.912	3.8	1.1	.3	.4	7.3
2000–01	San Antonio	80	29	21.1	.475	**.449**	.733	2.8	.9	.4	.3	5.6
2001–02	San Antonio	50	2	16.0	.429	.434	**.944**	1.8	1.0	.3	.2	4.6
2002–03†	San Antonio	64	1	9.4	.355	.350	.769	1.2	.3	.1	.1	1.9
Career		917	186	19.8	.446	.393	.840	2.8	1.3	.4	.3	7.0

=== Playoffs ===
Year	Team	GP	GS	MPG	FG%	3P%	FT%	RPG	APG	SPG	BPG	PPG
1992	Cleveland	9	0	6.1	.467	.333	**1.000**	1.8	.1	.1	.1	2.1
1993	Cleveland	8	0	14.8	.382	.444	.900	3.1	1.8	.5	.4	4.9
1994	Cleveland	1	0	4.0	–	–	–	.0	1.0	.0	.0	.0
1995	Cleveland	4	0	16.8	**.520**	**.533**	.667	.8	1.5	.5	.0	9.5
1996	Cleveland	3	3	**39.0**	.341	.063	–	**5.0**	**3.0**	**1.0**	**.7**	**9.7**
1998	Cleveland	3	0	3.3	.000	.000	–	.3	.0	.0	.0	.0
2001	San Antonio	13	**11**	25.7	.397	.457	–	3.2	1.3	.3	.1	5.8
2002	San Antonio	10	0	15.7	.303	.350	.250	2.0	.8	.0	.1	2.8
2003†	San Antonio	**16**	1	6.3	.286	.286	–	1.4	.4	.1	.0	1.3
Career		67	15	14.4	.374	.368	.750	2.1	.9	.2	.1	3.7

== See also ==
- List of NCAA Division I men's basketball players with 2000 points and 1000 rebounds
- List of second-generation NBA players
