= Joe Marelle =

American basketball coach (born 1951)

Joe Marelle Sr.
- Born: March 17, 1951 (age 74); Memphis, Tennessee, U.S.
- Occupation: Head coach (retired)
- Spouse: Kathy Marelle
- Children: Joey Marelle, Mary Pat Marelle, Tony Marelle

Joseph Marelle Sr. (born March 17, 1951) is an American former high school basketball coach and motivational speaker. He is one of the most successful high school basketball coaches in Georgia. After surviving both non-Hodgkin's lymphoma and acute leukemia, Marelle started speaking publicly about his experience in Georgia and the national high school and college basketball communities.

== Career and education ==
Marelle was named head basketball coach at Duluth High School in 1981, where he coached for 19 seasons. He also was the school's athletic director from 1991 to 2001. During his tenure, his teams won four Georgia state sub-region championships, and in 1985 he led his team to the semifinals of the Georgia Class AA tournament. Marelle was named the Gwinnett County Coach of the Year in 1985, 1986, and 1995.

Marelle also worked as the head coach of Mount Pisgah Christian School from 2005 to 2007, a tenure that included a Class AAA state championship in his first year as head coach, and a 30-9 record over that span.

After working at Mount Pisgah, Marelle transitioned to an assistant coaching role at Greater Atlanta Christian School, where he coached from 2009 to 2014 and helped the school compile a 121-9 record during those years.

Marelle graduated from the University of North Florida with a degree in physical education and earned a master's degree from the University of Tennessee in 1975.

== Cancer diagnosis ==
Marelle was first diagnosed with cancer in 1998 after experiencing severe pain during a trip to San Antonio, Texas, where he was a coach at the National Basketball Coaches Association's Final Four. He was diagnosed with a supposedly incurable form of stage 4 non-Hodgkin lymphoma and given only six months to live. He underwent six years of chemotherapy treatments which eventually put his lymphoma into remission, but which also contributed to his second cancer diagnosis of acute leukemia.

Marelle was given a life-saving experimental bone marrow transplant from his oldest son and was able to return to coaching in 2005 as head coach at Mount Pisgah Christian School.

== Motivational speaking & philanthropy ==
After his cancer's remission, Marelle was approached by Coaches vs. Cancer, a nationwide collaboration between the American Cancer Society and the National Association of Basketball Coaches, to give a speech about his life. He accepted the invitation and went on to host a Coaches vs. Cancer fundraiser, auctioning pieces of sports memorabilia. The auction raised more than $10,000 for the American Cancer Society.

Marelle's experiences were the subject of the book Coaching To Defeat Cancer, which discusses the success stories of nine basketball coaches and cancer survivors.

Marelle's wife Kathy Marelle helped to plan "Brylee's Bash in the Park", a fundraiser for another Duluth family with a family member undergoing cancer treatment.

Marelle sent a letter to Larry Shyatt, then the head coach at Clemson University, in which he relayed his health situation and urged Shyatt and his players to keeping fighting hard in the midst of an eight-game losing streak during the 2000 to 2001 season. Shyatt read the letter to his team before their first game. A few days later, Clemson upset number-one ranked North Carolina for the second time in the school's history.

== Awards and recognition ==
Marelle was presented an autographed ball from the American Cancer Society for his involvement with Coaches vs. Cancer awareness.

Representative Brooks Coleman initiated a resolution in the Georgia State House of Representatives to commend Marelle for his outstanding coaching career and for inspiring others with his approach to battling cancer.

The Gwinnett Country Tip Off Club named an annual award after Marelle, calling it the Joe Marelle Courage Award. The award is presented to an outstanding player who has overcome health problems or other obstacles.

In 2003, a new gym at Duluth High School was dedicated and named in honor of Marelle.

The American Cancer Society's Coaches vs. Cancer named Marelle their "National Coach of the Year" in 2004, and Marelle spoke at the 2004 NCAA Final Four tournament to both coaches and players.

Marelle was named the 2005 to 2006 Georgia Independent School Association (GISA) Coach of the Year.

== Notable players coached ==
- Nick Green, American former professional baseball infielder
- Brian McCann, World Series winning American professional baseball catcher for the Houston Astros
- Malcolm Brogdon, 2016–2017 NBA Rookie of the Year and player for the Milwaukee Bucks
- Isaiah Wilkins, University of Virginia men's basketball player featured by Sports Illustrated in March 2018, and stepson of NBA legend Dominique Wilkins
