= Henry James (basketball) =

American basketball player (born 1965)

Personal information
- Born: July 29, 1965 (age 60) Centreville, Alabama, U.S.
- Listed height: 6 ft 8 in (2.03 m)
- Listed weight: 220 lb (100 kg)

Career information
- High school: North Side (Fort Wayne, Indiana)
- College: South Plains (1984–1986); St. Mary's (Texas) (1986–1988)
- NBA draft: 1988: undrafted
- Playing career: 1988–2003
- Position: Power forward / small forward
- Number: 32, 51, 22, 21, 42

Career history
- 1988–1989; 1990–1991: Wichita Falls Texans
- 1990–1992: Cleveland Cavaliers
- 1992: Scavolini Pesaro
- 1992–1993: Utah Jazz
- 1992–1994: Wichita Falls Texans
- 1993: Sacramento Kings
- 1993–1994: Los Angeles Clippers
- 1994–1997: Sioux Falls Skyforce
- 1995–1996: Houston Rockets
- 1996–1997: Atlanta Hawks
- 1997–1998: Cleveland Cavaliers
- 1998–1999: Sioux Falls Skyforce
- 2001: Lakeland Blue Ducks
- 2001–2002: Gary Steelheads
- 2001–2003: Sioux Falls Skyforce
- 2002: St. Joseph Express

Career highlights
- CBA champion (1996); CBA Playoff/Finals MVP (1996); All-CBA First Team (1994); 2× All-CBA Second Team (1993, 1996)
- Stats at NBA.com
- Stats at Basketball Reference

Henry Charles James (born July 29, 1965) is an American retired professional basketball player out of St. Mary's University, Texas. He played parts of seven seasons in the National Basketball Association (NBA), as well as in several other leagues.

The 6'8" small forward signed with the Cleveland Cavaliers during the 1990–91 season and in 37 games, averaged 8.1 points per game. He played with six other teams throughout his career, and once in 1996–97 as a member of the Atlanta Hawks, hit a then-record tying seven three-pointers in a quarter. He also had a career in the Philippine Basketball Association and spent parts of 10 seasons in the Continental Basketball Association for the Wichita Falls Texans, Sioux Falls Skyforce and Gary Steelheads. He won a CBA championship with the Skyforce in 1996. James was selected as the CBA Playoff/Finals Most Valuable Player in 1996, and named to the All-CBA First Team in 1994 and All-CBA Second Team in 1993 and 1996.

On September 7, 2006, James was charged with two counts of the felony for selling a total of $750 in crack cocaine to an undercover police officer on August 30 and September 7. His six children (all under the age of 11) were present during his last deal. In May 2007, James, of Fort Wayne, Indiana, was sentenced to serve five years in federal prison after pleading guilty to a charge of distribution of a controlled substance.
