= Bobby Phills =

American basketball player (1969–2000)

Personal information
- Born: December 20, 1969 Baton Rouge, Louisiana, U.S.
- Died: January 12, 2000 (aged 30) Charlotte, North Carolina, U.S.
- Listed height: 6 ft 5 in (1.96 m)
- Listed weight: 210 lb (95 kg)

Career information
- High school: Southern Laboratory School (Baton Rouge, Louisiana)
- College: Southern (1987–1991)
- NBA draft: 1991: 2nd round, 45th overall pick
- Drafted by: Milwaukee Bucks
- Playing career: 1991–2000
- Position: Shooting guard
- Number: 14, 13

Career history
- 1991–1992: Sioux Falls Skyforce
- 1992–1997: Cleveland Cavaliers
- 1993: Banco Natwest Zaragoza
- 1997–2000: Charlotte Hornets

Career highlights
- NBA All-Defensive Second Team (1996); No. 13 retired by Charlotte Hornets; CBA All-Rookie Team (1992); First-team All-SWAC (1991); No. 34 retired by Southern Jaguars

Career NBA statistics
- Points: 5,153 (11.0 ppg)
- Assists: 1,246 (2.7 apg)
- Steals: 592 (1.3 spg)
- Stats at NBA.com
- Stats at Basketball Reference

Bobby Ray Phills II (December 20, 1969 – January 12, 2000) was an American professional basketball player. He played shooting guard and small forward for the National Basketball Association's Cleveland Cavaliers and Charlotte Hornets.

A native of Baton Rouge, Louisiana, Phills attended Baton Rouge's Southern University. He was a member of Alpha Phi Alpha. He was selected by the Milwaukee Bucks in the 1991 NBA draft (45th overall).

After being cut in December 1991 without playing a game for the Bucks, Phills had a stint with the Sioux Falls Skyforce of the Continental Basketball Association (CBA) and was named to the All-Rookie Team in 1992. He was signed by the Cavaliers and rejoined the NBA late in the 1991–92 season. Over his nine-year career, he averaged 11.0 points, 3.1 rebounds, and 2.7 assists per game. He was known as a defensive stopper, averaging 1.3 steals per game for his career, and ranks in the NBA's top 100 all-time with his career three pointer percentage of 39.0%. In 2000, he was killed in an automobile accident.

== College ==
Phills attended Southern University in Baton Rouge, Louisiana, and was a member of the Alpha Phi Alpha fraternity. He led the NCAA in three-point field goals per game (4.39) his senior year.

== Player profile ==
Though he made a name for himself as a shooter during his college career, Phills became known as a tenacious wing defender in the NBA. At 6' 5" and 220 pounds, he was said to more resemble an NFL linebacker than a basketball player. In 1996, Michael Jordan remarked that Phills was the toughest defender he had ever faced.

== Death ==
On January 12, 2000, while a member of the Charlotte Hornets, Phills was killed in a car accident in Charlotte, North Carolina. Phills was traveling behind teammate David Wesley at over 100 mph (160 km/h) when his Porsche 911 spun off, crossed into oncoming traffic and collided head-on with an Oldsmobile, which in turn was struck in the rear by a minivan. The drivers of the other two vehicles recovered, while Phills was pronounced dead at the scene. A police report said Phills and Wesley were driving "in an erratic, reckless, careless, negligent or aggressive manner." Wesley was later convicted of reckless driving after being cleared of a racing charge.

== Personal life ==
Phills was survived by his parents, his wife Kendall, and three children; a daughter Brittany Dickson, a son Bobby Ray Phills III, known as Trey and a daughter Kerstie. Trey gained statewide recognition in North Carolina while playing for Charlotte Christian School. He played college basketball for the Yale Bulldogs and now plays for the Greensboro Swarm of the NBA G League. After starting her college career at Wagner, Kerstie transferred and is currently a redshirt sophomore for Florida Gulf Coast University.

== Legacy ==
The Charlotte Hornets retired Phills' #13 jersey on February 9, 2000, during halftime of a game against Phills' former team, the Cleveland Cavaliers. It was the first number that the Hornets franchise had retired. The Hornets also wore a patch bearing his #13 on their jerseys for the remainder of the 1999–2000 season. Phills' jersey hung from the rafters of the Charlotte Coliseum until the team relocated to New Orleans in 2002; it was then displayed in the New Orleans Arena until 2013. In 2004, the NBA added an expansion team, the Charlotte Bobcats. The Bobcats did not issue number 13 out of respect to Phills.

In 2013, the New Orleans Hornets changed their name to the New Orleans Pelicans. The following year, the Bobcats also re-branded, bringing the Hornets name back to Charlotte. Additionally, the original Charlotte Hornets' history from 1988 to 2002 was transferred to the renamed team. On November 1, 2014, the Charlotte Hornets retired Phills' jersey number a second time; it currently hangs from the rafters of the Spectrum Center.

The Pelicans have since returned the number 13 to circulation; the 2016–17 season saw Cheick Diallo become the first Pelicans player to wear the number after its reactivation.

== Career statistics ==
Legend
GP	Games played	GS	Games started	MPG	Minutes per game
FG%	Field goal percentage	3P%	3-point field goal percentage	FT%	Free throw percentage
RPG	Rebounds per game	APG	Assists per game	SPG	Steals per game
BPG	Blocks per game	PPG	Points per game	**Bold**	Career high

=== NBA ===
==== Regular season ====
Year	Team	GP	GS	MPG	FG%	3P%	FT%	RPG	APG	SPG	BPG	PPG
1991–92	Cleveland	10	0	6.5	.429	.000	.636	.8	.4	.3	.1	3.1
1992–93	Cleveland	31	0	4.5	.463	.400	.600	.5	.3	.3	.1	3.0
1993–94	Cleveland	72	53	21.3	**.471**	.083	.720	2.9	1.8	.9	.2	8.3
1994–95	Cleveland	**80**	**79**	31.3	.414	.345	**.779**	3.3	2.3	1.4	.3	11.0
1995–96	Cleveland	72	69	35.1	.467	**.441**	.775	3.6	**3.8**	1.4	.4	**14.6**
1996–97	Cleveland	69	65	34.4	.428	.394	.718	3.6	3.4	**1.6**	.3	12.6
1997–98	Charlotte	62	61	30.4	.446	.386	.757	3.5	3.0	1.3	.3	10.4
1998–99	Charlotte	43	43	**36.6**	.433	.395	.685	**4.0**	3.5	1.4	**.6**	14.3
1999–00	Charlotte	28	9	29.5	.454	.330	.723	2.5	2.8	1.5	.3	13.6
Career		467	379	28.7	.443	.390	.738	3.1	2.7	1.3	.3	11.0

==== Playoffs ====
Year	Team	GP	GS	MPG	FG%	3P%	FT%	RPG	APG	SPG	BPG	PPG
1992	Cleveland	5	0	2.4	**.444**	.000	.750	1.2	1.0	.2	.0	2.2
1993	Cleveland	2	0	4.5	.333	–	**1.000**	.0	.0	.0	.0	2.0
1994	Cleveland	3	2	22.7	.375	**1.000**	.500	**4.7**	2.3	.7	.0	6.7
1995	Cleveland	4	4	**36.5**	.442	.571	.750	3.0	1.5	**2.3**	.0	**14.3**
1996	Cleveland	3	3	32.0	.371	.200	.250	**4.7**	2.0	.7	**.3**	9.7
1998	Charlotte	**9**	**9**	29.9	.391	.294	.250	2.6	**2.7**	1.1	.2	6.3
Career		26	18	23.1	.399	.333	.600	2.7	1.8	.9	.1	6.8

== See also ==
- List of basketball players who died during their careers
- List of NCAA Division I men's basketball season 3-point field goal leaders
