= 1992 NBA Finals =

1992 basketball championship series

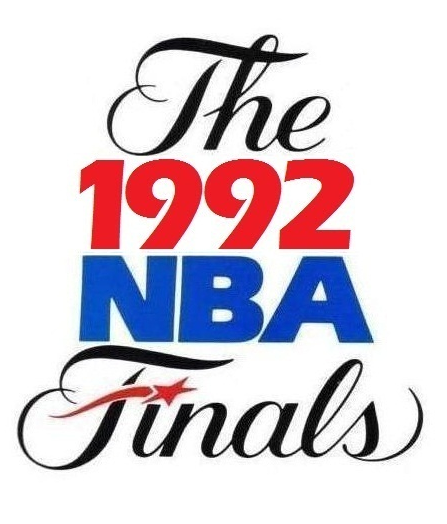
| Team | Coach | Wins |
|---|---|---|
| Chicago Bulls | Phil Jackson | 4 |
| Portland Trail Blazers | Rick Adelman | 2 |
- Dates: June 3–14
- MVP: Michael Jordan (Chicago Bulls)
- Hall of Famers: Trail Blazers: Clyde Drexler (2004); Bulls: Michael Jordan (2009); Scottie Pippen (2010); Coaches: Rick Adelman (2021); Phil Jackson (2007); Tex Winter (2011); Officials: Dick Bavetta (2015); Hugh Evans (2022); Darell Garretson (2016)
- Eastern finals: Bulls defeated Cavaliers, 4–2
- Western finals: Trail Blazers defeated Jazz, 4–2

The 1992 NBA Finals was the championship series of the National Basketball Association's (NBA) 1991–92 season, and the conclusion of the season's playoffs. The defending NBA champion and Eastern Conference champion Chicago Bulls took on the Western Conference champion Portland Trail Blazers for the title, with Chicago having home court advantage, as they had the best record in the NBA that season.

The two teams appeared headed to face each other for most of the season and comparisons were made between Clyde Drexler and Michael Jordan throughout the season. A month earlier Sports Illustrated had even listed Drexler as Jordan's "No. 1 rival" on a cover the two appeared on together before the playoffs. The media, hoping to recreate a Magic Johnson–Larry Bird type rivalry in Jordan-Drexler, compared the two throughout the pre-Finals hype.

The Bulls went on to win the series in six games, becoming the fourth NBA team to win back-to-back championships after the Boston Celtics, Los Angeles Lakers, and Detroit Pistons. Michael Jordan was named Finals Most Valuable Player for the second year in a row, to go with his sixth straight regular season scoring title.

== Background ==
=== Chicago Bulls ===
The Bulls won their first NBA championship the previous season and finished the 1991–92 season with a 67–15 record, surpassing last season's record by six games. Jordan won his second consecutive MVP award with a 30.1 points/6.4 assists/6.1 rebounds season.

After sweeping the Miami Heat in the opening round, they played the New York Knicks, who were now coached by Pat Riley and won in seven games. Then they played the Cleveland Cavaliers, whom they had beaten in two prior postseason meetings, in the conference finals. The Bulls won in six games.

=== Portland Trail Blazers ===
Coming off an NBA Finals loss to the Detroit Pistons the previous season, the 1990–91 Trail Blazers won a franchise record 63 games and, as the top seed in the Western Conference, appeared destined to meet the Bulls for the championship. However, the Los Angeles Lakers upended the narrative, defeating Portland in a six-game Conference Finals. However, the Lakers would lose to the Bulls in the Finals. Of note, the upset marked a final hurrah for the "Showtime"-era Lakers, as Kareem Abdul-Jabbar had retired two years prior, and Magic Johnson would retire unexpectedly in the first week of the 1991–92 season, after learning he had tested positive for HIV.

For the 1991–92 season, the Blazers retained the same core from the previous two seasons; the team won the Pacific Division title with a 57–25 record. In the first round of the playoffs, they avenged the previous year's loss, dispatching a weakened Lakers team, 3–1. Portland followed that up with a five-game defeat of the Phoenix Suns in the second round, before booking another trip to the Finals with a six-game elimination of the Utah Jazz in the Conference Finals.

=== Road to the Finals ===
| Portland Trail Blazers (Western Conference champion) | | Chicago Bulls (Eastern Conference champion) |
|---|---|---|
| # / Western Conference; # / Team / W / L / PCT / GB; 1 / c-Portland Trail Blazers / 57 / 25 / .695 / –; 2 / y-Utah Jazz / 55 / 27 / .671 / 2; 3 / x-Golden State Warriors / 55 / 27 / .671 / 2; 4 / x-Phoenix Suns / 53 / 29 / .646 / 4; 5 / x-San Antonio Spurs / 47 / 35 / .573 / 10; 6 / x-Seattle SuperSonics / 47 / 35 / .573 / 10; 7 / x-Los Angeles Clippers / 45 / 37 / .549 / 12; 8 / x-Los Angeles Lakers / 43 / 39 / .524 / 14; 9 / Houston Rockets / 42 / 40 / .512 / 15; 10 / Sacramento Kings / 29 / 53 / .354 / 28; 11 / Denver Nuggets / 24 / 58 / .293 / 33; 12 / Dallas Mavericks / 22 / 60 / .268 / 35; 13 / Minnesota Timberwolves / 15 / 67 / .183 / 42; 1st seed in the West, 2nd best league record | Regular season | # / Eastern Conference; # / Team / W / L / PCT / GB; 1 / z-Chicago Bulls / 67 / 15 / .817 / –; 2 / y-Boston Celtics / 51 / 31 / .622 / 16; 3 / x-Cleveland Cavaliers / 57 / 25 / .695 / 10; 4 / x-New York Knicks / 51 / 31 / .622 / 16; 5 / x-Detroit Pistons / 48 / 34 / .585 / 19; 6 / x-New Jersey Nets / 40 / 42 / .488 / 27; 7 / x-Indiana Pacers / 40 / 42 / .488 / 27; 8 / x-Miami Heat / 38 / 44 / .463 / 29; 9 / Atlanta Hawks / 38 / 44 / .463 / 29; 10 / Philadelphia 76ers / 35 / 47 / .427 / 32; 11 / Milwaukee Bucks / 31 / 51 / .378 / 36; 12 / Charlotte Hornets / 31 / 51 / .378 / 36; 13 / Washington Bullets / 25 / 57 / .305 / 42; 14 / Orlando Magic / 21 / 61 / .256 / 46; 1st seed in the East, best league record |
| Defeated the (8) Los Angeles Lakers, 3–1 | First round | Defeated the (8) Miami Heat, 3–0 |
| Defeated the (4) Phoenix Suns, 4–1 | Conference semifinals | Defeated the (4) New York Knicks, 4–3 |
| Defeated the (2) Utah Jazz, 4–2 | Conference finals | Defeated the (3) Cleveland Cavaliers, 4–2 |

=== Regular season series ===
The Chicago Bulls won both games in the regular season series:

November 29, 1991

Chicago Bulls 116, Portland Trail Blazers 114 (2OT)

Memorial Coliseum, Portland, Oregon

March 1, 1992

Portland Trail Blazers 91, Chicago Bulls 111

Chicago Stadium, Chicago, Illinois

Nationally televised on NBC, the two teams met on March 1 at Chicago Stadium in a highly anticipated matchup. The Bulls blew out the Trail Blazers, 111–91, but pre-game comments made by Phil Jackson was the most important story of the game. Jackson stated in an interview with NBC that Portland had a reputation of self-destructing down the stretch in close games. Before the start of the Finals, Buck Williams called the comments by Jackson in March "sort of derogatory" and Portland's head coach Rick Adelman stated the only way for the narrative around his team would go away was to win the championship. In the opening montage before the Game 1, NBC's pre-game host Bob Costas highlighted this point. Jackson's comments would prove to be prophetic for the 1992 Finals, as the Blazers blew a 79–64 lead at the start of the fourth quarter in the clinching Game 6 for the Bulls.

== Team rosters ==
=== Chicago Bulls ===
1991–92 Chicago Bulls roster
Players

| Pos. | No. | Player | Height | Weight | DOB | From |
|---|---|---|---|---|---|---|
| PG | 10 | B. J. Armstrong | 6 ft 2 in (1.88 m) | 175 lb (79 kg) | 1967–09–09 | Iowa |
| C | 24 | Bill Cartwright | 7 ft 1 in (2.16 m) | 245 lb (111 kg) | 1957–07–30 | San Francisco |
| PF | 54 | Horace Grant | 6 ft 10 in (2.08 m) | 245 lb (111 kg) | 1965–07–04 | Clemson |
| SG | 20 | Bobby Hansen | 6 ft 6 in (1.98 m) | 190 lb (86 kg) | 1961–01–18 | Iowa |
| SG | 14 | Craig Hodges | 6 ft 2 in (1.88 m) | 190 lb (86 kg) | 1960–06–27 | Long Beach State |
| SG | 23 | Michael Jordan | 6 ft 6 in (1.98 m) | 215 lb (98 kg) | 1963–02–17 | North Carolina |
| PF | 21 | Stacey King | 6 ft 11 in (2.11 m) | 230 lb (104 kg) | 1967–01–29 | Oklahoma |
| PF | 53 | Cliff Levingston | 6 ft 8 in (2.03 m) | 230 lb (104 kg) | 1961–01–04 | Wichita State |
| C | 25 | Chuck Nevitt | 7 ft 5 in (2.26 m) | 217 lb (98 kg) | 1960–02–19 | Kansas State |
| PG | 5 | John Paxson | 6 ft 2 in (1.88 m) | 185 lb (84 kg) | 1959–06–13 | Notre Dame |
| C | 32 | Will Perdue | 7 ft 0 in (2.13 m) | 240 lb (109 kg) | 1965–08–29 | Vanderbilt |
| SF | 33 | Scottie Pippen | 6 ft 7 in (2.01 m) | 220 lb (100 kg) | 1965–09–25 | Central Arkansas |
| PF | 52 | Mark Randall | 6 ft 8 in (2.03 m) | 235 lb (107 kg) | 1967–09–30 | Kansas |
| PF | 42 | Scott Williams | 6 ft 10 in (2.08 m) | 230 lb (104 kg) | 1968–03–21 | North Carolina |

Coaches
Head coach
- Phil Jackson
Assistant(s)
- Johnny Bach
- Jim Cleamons
- Tex Winter

Legend
- (DP) Unsigned draft pick
- (FA) Free agent
- (S) Suspended
- Injured

=== Portland Trail Blazers ===
1991–92 Portland Trail Blazers roster
Players

| Pos. | No. | Player | Height | Weight | DOB | From |
|---|---|---|---|---|---|---|
| PF | 31 | Alaa Abdelnaby | 6 ft 10 in (2.08 m) | 240 lb (109 kg) | 1968–06–24 | Duke |
| SG | 9 | Danny Ainge | 6 ft 4 in (1.93 m) | 175 lb (79 kg) | 1959–03–17 | BYU |
| PF | 2 | Mark Bryant | 6 ft 9 in (2.06 m) | 245 lb (111 kg) | 1965–04–25 | Seton Hall |
| C | 42 | Wayne Cooper | 6 ft 10 in (2.08 m) | 220 lb (100 kg) | 1956–11–16 | LSU New Orleans |
| SG | 22 | Clyde Drexler | 6 ft 7 in (2.01 m) | 210 lb (95 kg) | 1962–06–22 | Houston |
| C | 00 | Kevin Duckworth | 7 ft 0 in (2.13 m) | 275 lb (125 kg) | 1964–04–01 | Eastern Illinois |
| SF | 25 | Jerome Kersey | 6 ft 7 in (2.01 m) | 215 lb (98 kg) | 1962–06–26 | Longwood |
| PG | 14 | Robert Pack | 6 ft 2 in (1.88 m) | 180 lb (82 kg) | 1969–02–03 | USC |
| PG | 30 | Terry Porter | 6 ft 3 in (1.91 m) | 195 lb (88 kg) | 1963–04–08 | UW–Stevens Point |
| PF | 3 | Clifford Robinson | 6 ft 10 in (2.08 m) | 225 lb (102 kg) | 1966–12–16 | Connecticut |
| SG | 12 | Lamont Strothers | 6 ft 4 in (1.93 m) | 190 lb (86 kg) | 1968–05–10 | Christopher Newport |
| PG | 8 | Ennis Whatley | 6 ft 3 in (1.91 m) | 177 lb (80 kg) | 1962–08–11 | Alabama |
| PF | 52 | Buck Williams | 6 ft 8 in (2.03 m) | 215 lb (98 kg) | 1960–03–08 | Maryland |

Coaches
Head coach
- Rick Adelman
Assistant(s)
- Jack Schalow
- John Wetzel

Legend
- (DP) Unsigned draft pick
- (FA) Free agent
- (S) Suspended
- Injured

== Series summary ==
| Game | Date | Road team | Result | Home team |
|---|---|---|---|---|
| Game 1 | June 3 | Portland Trail Blazers | 89–122 (0–1) | Chicago Bulls |
| Game 2 | June 5 | Portland Trail Blazers | 115–104 (OT) (1–1) | Chicago Bulls |
| Game 3 | June 7 | Chicago Bulls | 94–84 (2–1) | Portland Trail Blazers |
| Game 4 | June 10 | Chicago Bulls | 88–93 (2–2) | Portland Trail Blazers |
| Game 5 | June 12 | Chicago Bulls | 119–106 (3–2) | Portland Trail Blazers |
| Game 6 | June 14 | Portland Trail Blazers | 93–97 (2–4) | Chicago Bulls |

=== Game 1 ===
NBC

June 3
9:00et

Portland Trail Blazers 89, Chicago Bulls 122
Scoring by quarter: 30–33, 21–33, 17–38, 21–18
| Pts: Drexler, Robinson 16 each Rebs: Jerome Kersey 7 Asts: Clyde Drexler 7 | Pts: Michael Jordan 39; Rebs: Pippen, Williams 9 each Asts: Michael Jordan 11 |
Chicago leads the series, 1–0

Chicago Stadium, Chicago, Illinois
Attendance: 18,676
Referees:
- No. 11 Jake O'Donnell
- No. 42 Hue Hollins
- No. 27 Dick Bavetta

Michael Jordan dominated from the beginning, breaking the record for most points in a first half in the playoffs once held by Elgin Baylor (Jordan had 35, Baylor had 33). This included six first-half threes (also a record). It was after the sixth three-pointer that Jordan turned towards the broadcast table and famously shrugged to indicate his surprise (Urban legend is Jordan and Magic Johnson were playing cards the night before and Johnson bet Jordan about shooting 3 pointers. The shrug was supposedly in Johnson's direction, who was on the NBC announce team). Jordan's shrug became a highlight reel mainstay. Portland held their final lead at 45–44 in the second quarter before Chicago went on a 22–6 run to grab a 66–51 halftime lead and take control. The Bulls finished with a 122–89 win over the Portland Trail Blazers.

=== Game 2 ===
NBC

June 5
9:00et

Portland Trail Blazers 115, Chicago Bulls 104 (OT)
Scoring by quarter: 31–23, 23–22, 16–32, 27–20, Overtime: 18–7
| Pts: Clyde Drexler 26; Rebs: Buck Williams 14; Asts: Clyde Drexler 8 | Pts: Michael Jordan 39; Rebs: Horace Grant 12; Asts: Jordan, Pippen 10 each |
Series tied, 1–1

Chicago Stadium, Chicago, Illinois
Attendance: 18,676
Referees:
- No. 25 Hugh Evans
- No. 20 Jess Kersey
- No. 22 Paul Mihalik

With the Chicago Blackhawks playing for the Stanley Cup when the Bulls reached the Finals, Game 2 would have had conflict with Game 6 of the Blackhawks' series, as both teams would have played on the same day at Chicago Stadium. However, the Blackhawks series ended in 4 games, so no rescheduling was needed.

Portland built an eight-point lead in the first quarter, and held a nine-point lead at the half. However, as in Game 1, their lead started to disappear as the Bulls made their run – Jordan scored 14 points while Paxson scored 9, taking a seven-point lead by the end of the third quarter. Chicago was looking to take a commanding 2–0 lead in the series when Clyde Drexler fouled out with 4:36 remaining. With the Bulls up by 10, Jordan started to lose his poise, committing a foul and then a technical foul. This helped Portland build a 15–5 run, pushing the game into overtime after Jordan narrowly missed at the buzzer. In overtime, Portland dominated, especially Ainge, who scored six points with one minute remaining as the Blazers won 115–104 – the Bulls' worst home defeat in an NBA Finals game.

=== Game 3 ===
NBC

June 7
7:00et

Chicago Bulls 94, Portland Trail Blazers 84
Scoring by quarter: 34–26, 20–19, 16–15, 24–24
| Pts: Michael Jordan 26; Rebs: Grant, Pippen 8 each Asts: Scottie Pippen 7 | Pts: Clyde Drexler 32; Rebs: Jerome Kersey 12; Asts: Terry Porter 4 |
Chicago leads the series, 2–1

Memorial Coliseum, Portland, Oregon
Attendance: 12,888
Referees:
- No. 4 Ed T. Rush
- No. 13 Mike Mathis
- No. 21 Bill Oakes

Chicago had lost home court advantage, but dominated Portland, holding them to numerous franchise playoff lows: 84 points in a game, 39 second-half points and 28 field goals. Chicago would go on a 30–13 run in the first half to gain a 44–30 lead which Portland would cut to three with 7:09 left in the third before the Bulls went to another 12–3 run. Portland would then go on a field goal drought, not scoring from the 4:33 mark in the third quarter until the 9:36 mark of the fourth, a 6:57 stretch.

=== Game 4 ===
NBC

June 10
9:00et

Chicago Bulls 88, Portland Trail Blazers 93
Scoring by quarter: 26–18, 22–27, 21–21, 19–27
| Pts: Michael Jordan 32; Rebs: Horace Grant 10; Asts: Jordan, Pippen 6 each | Pts: Drexler, Kersey 21 each Rebs: Kevin Duckworth 11; Asts: Clyde Drexler 9 |
Series tied, 2–2

Memorial Coliseum, Portland, Oregon
Attendance: 12,888
Referees:
- No. 10 Darell Garretson
- No. 17 Joey Crawford
- No. 27 Dick Bavetta

Portland was still playing as they were during Game 3, not scoring for four minutes and finding themselves down 10–0. The Bulls were up 22–9 before the Blazers rallied and cut the deficit to three at the half, but found themselves down again in the third quarter. While Jordan scored 13 points in the third quarter, he would not score in the game's final 10:26. Portland went on a 15–6 run to even the series at two games apiece.

=== Game 5 ===
NBC

June 12
9:00et

Chicago Bulls 119, Portland Trail Blazers 106
Scoring by quarter: 39–26, 27–28, 28–24, 25–28
| Pts: Michael Jordan 46; Rebs: Scottie Pippen 11; Asts: Scottie Pippen 9 | Pts: Clyde Drexler 30; Rebs: Jerome Kersey 12; Asts: Terry Porter 8 |
Chicago leads the series, 3–2

Memorial Coliseum, Portland, Oregon
Attendance: 12,888
Referees:
- No. 11 Jake O'Donnell
- No. 20 Jess Kersey
- No. 42 Hue Hollins

The Bulls jumped out to a 10–2 lead and never looked back, answering every Blazers comeback attempt with a run of their own. Chicago opened the second half on a 16–8 run to give the Bulls a 20-point lead. Portland didn't pull back within single digits until less than four minutes were left in the game, and ended up losing 119–106.

Michael Jordan, who briefly sat with a bad ankle, finished with 46 points on 14-of-23 from the field and 16-of-19 from the line. Scottie Pippen fell just short of a triple-double, with 24 points, 11 rebounds and nine assists. Clyde Drexler scored 30 points to lead six Portland players in double figures. However, Portland had 18 turnovers and shot just 43.8 percent from the field, compared to 54.8 percent for the Bulls.

Game 5 remains the most recent NBA Finals game played in Portland to date.

=== Game 6 ===
NBC

June 14
7:30et

Portland Trail Blazers 93, Chicago Bulls 97
Scoring by quarter: 25–19, 25–25, 29–20, 14–33
| Pts: Drexler, Kersey 24 each Rebs: Jerome Kersey 9 Asts: Terry Porter 8 | Pts: Michael Jordan 33; Rebs: Scott Williams 8 Asts: Horace Grant 5 |
Chicago wins the NBA Finals, 4–2

Chicago Stadium, Chicago, Illinois
Attendance: 18,676
Referees:
- No. 25 Hugh Evans
- No. 4 Ed T. Rush
- No. 13 Mike Mathis

Portland started strongly as they held Michael Jordan scoreless for the game's first 11 minutes, and took a 43–28 lead midway through the second quarter before Chicago went on a 16–7 run and cut the deficit to only six points. Portland also dominated the third quarter, building a 79–64 lead. Phil Jackson went with four reserves and Scottie Pippen to start the fourth quarter, cutting Portland's lead to three after only three minutes. Jordan returned and had two steals and converted them to hoops to give Chicago a permanent lead. With 11.8 seconds left and the Bulls up by 2, Jordan virtually clinched the title by hitting 2 free throws bringing him to 12 points in the fourth quarter. Kersey then missed a 3 which was rebounded by Paxson who dribbled out the clock. The Bulls' defense held Portland to only six points in the final four minutes, leading the Bulls to their second straight championship. Jordan finished with 33 points and was named Finals MVP for the second consecutive year.

== Player statistics ==
Legend
| GP | Games played | GS | Games started | MPG | Minutes per game |
| FG% | Field-goal percentage | 3P% | 3-point field-goal percentage | FT% | Free-throw percentage |
| RPG | Rebounds per game | APG | Assists per game | SPG | Steals per game |
| BPG | Blocks per game | PPG | Points per game |

Chicago Bulls

Chicago Bulls statistics
| Player | GP | GS | MPG | FG% | 3P% | FT% | RPG | APG | SPG | BPG | PPG |
|---|---|---|---|---|---|---|---|---|---|---|---|
| B. J. Armstrong | 6 | 0 | 17.8 | .429 | .250 | .571 | 0.8 | 2.3 | 0.3 | 0.0 | 5.8 |
| Bill Cartwright | 6 | 6 | 25.2 | .500 | .000 | .500 | 4.0 | 1.5 | 0.5 | 0.2 | 6.3 |
| Horace Grant | 6 | 6 | 37.8 | .561 | .000 | .529 | 7.8 | 4.0 | 0.8 | 2.3 | 9.2 |
| Bob Hansen | 5 | 0 | 8.0 | .600 | .750 | .500 | 0.4 | 0.6 | 0.2 | 0.0 | 3.2 |
| Craig Hodges | 2 | 0 | 3.0 | 1.000 | .000 | .000 | 0.0 | 0.0 | 0.5 | 0.0 | 1.0 |
| Michael Jordan | 6 | 6 | 42.3 | .526 | .429 | .891 | 4.8 | 6.5 | 1.7 | 0.3 | 35.8 |
| Stacey King | 4 | 0 | 12.0 | .333 | .000 | .667 | 2.5 | 0.0 | 0.3 | 0.3 | 4.5 |
| Cliff Levingston | 6 | 0 | 10.8 | .450 | .000 | .500 | 2.2 | 0.7 | 0.2 | 0.2 | 3.8 |
| John Paxson | 6 | 6 | 30.8 | .520 | .389 | .750 | 0.8 | 2.7 | 1.3 | 0.0 | 10.3 |
| Will Perdue | 3 | 0 | 3.3 | .333 | .000 | .000 | 1.0 | 0.0 | 0.0 | 0.0 | 0.7 |
| Scottie Pippen | 6 | 6 | 40.7 | .484 | .222 | .786 | 8.3 | 7.7 | 1.5 | 0.7 | 20.8 |
| Scott Williams | 6 | 0 | 21.3 | .542 | .000 | .778 | 6.2 | 1.0 | 0.2 | 1.3 | 5.5 |

Portland Trail Blazers

Portland Trail Blazers statistics
| Player | GP | GS | MPG | FG% | 3P% | FT% | RPG | APG | SPG | BPG | PPG |
|---|---|---|---|---|---|---|---|---|---|---|---|
| Alaa Abdelnaby | 1 | 0 | 6.0 | .000 | .000 | .500 | 2.0 | 0.0 | 0.0 | 0.0 | 1.0 |
| Danny Ainge | 6 | 0 | 23.0 | .434 | .235 | .714 | 2.0 | 2.5 | 0.8 | 0.2 | 10.0 |
| Mark Bryant | 1 | 0 | 21.0 | .625 | .000 | .000 | 5.0 | 0.0 | 0.0 | 0.0 | 10.0 |
| Wayne Cooper | 1 | 0 | 8.0 | .000 | .000 | .000 | 2.0 | 0.0 | 0.0 | 2.0 | 0.0 |
| Clyde Drexler | 6 | 6 | 39.7 | .407 | .150 | .893 | 7.8 | 5.3 | 1.3 | 1.0 | 24.8 |
| Kevin Duckworth | 6 | 6 | 27.3 | .431 | .000 | .706 | 6.8 | 1.5 | 0.5 | 0.7 | 9.3 |
| Jerome Kersey | 6 | 6 | 38.0 | .481 | .000 | .733 | 8.7 | 3.3 | 1.8 | 0.2 | 14.8 |
| Robert Pack | 2 | 0 | 8.0 | .167 | .000 | .750 | 0.5 | 0.5 | 0.5 | 0.0 | 2.5 |
| Terry Porter | 6 | 6 | 43.8 | .471 | .231 | .824 | 4.3 | 4.7 | 1.0 | 0.3 | 16.2 |
| Clifford Robinson | 6 | 0 | 24.3 | .442 | .000 | .593 | 3.0 | 2.2 | 0.8 | 0.7 | 10.3 |
| Ennis Whatley | 5 | 0 | 5.2 | .286 | .000 | .000 | 0.2 | 0.2 | 0.6 | 0.0 | 0.8 |
| Buck Williams | 6 | 6 | 35.2 | .500 | .000 | .938 | 7.3 | 1.0 | 0.8 | 0.5 | 7.8 |

== Media coverage ==
NBC Sports used commentator Marv Albert, analysts Mike Fratello and Magic Johnson, and sideline reporter Ahmad Rashad (both teams' sidelines). Bob Costas and Quinn Buckner hosted the pre-game, halftime and postgame reports.

Just months later, the 1991–92 NBA season documentary Untouchabulls was released. Narrated by Hal Douglas, it recaps the Bulls' championship season. "Jam" by Michael Jackson was used as the theme song for the documentary. That same year, Jordan was featured in Jackson's music video for "Jam".

== Aftermath ==
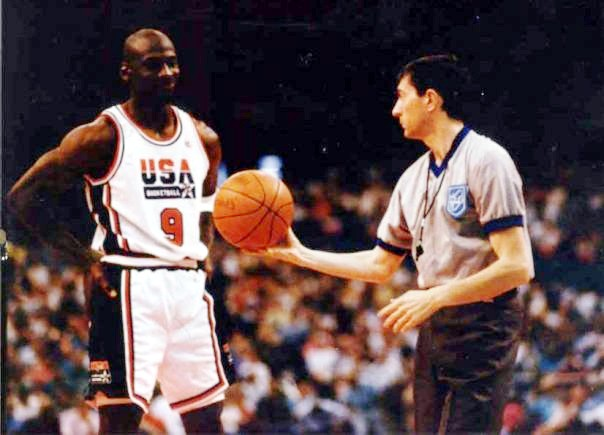
Jordan playing for the 1992 US Men's basketall team (also known as the Dream Team) during the 1992 Olympics in Barcelona.

In the offseason that preceded, Michael Jordan and Scottie Pippen played for the Dream Team that won the gold medal in the Barcelona Olympics, making them the first players to win NBA championship and Olympic gold medal in the same year; Blazers guard Clyde Drexler was also on the team. The 1992 gold medal made Jordan, Patrick Ewing of the New York Knicks and Chris Mullin of the Golden State Warriors the only players to have won Olympic gold medals as both amateurs and professionals, having played for Team USA in Los Angeles. Pippen won a NBA Finals and Olympic gold medal again four years later in Atlanta.

The Bulls won their third straight championship the next year over the Phoenix Suns in six games. They were the first NBA team to win three consecutive since the Boston Celtics won eight in a row from 1959 to 1966.

As of 2026, this is Portland's last appearance in the NBA Finals. In the next three seasons, the Blazers rebuilt the team, hiring general manager Bob Whitsitt in 1994 and lost the core of their 1992 Finals team to free agency and trades, beginning with Kevin Duckworth's departure to the Bullets in the 1993 offseason. The last remaining piece of the team, Clyde Drexler, was traded and went on to win the NBA championship with the Houston Rockets in 1995.

The 1991–92 Bulls, along with the 1995–96 Bulls, were named one of the 10 greatest teams in NBA history during the league's golden anniversary.

The 1992 NBA Finals marked the only time the Bulls won the championship at Chicago Stadium. Following the awarding ceremony by commissioner David Stern, they returned to the court to show their newly won title in front of Bulls fans. This act eventually led to Stern's decision to present the NBA championship to the winning team at center court in front of the fans, starting in 1994; the only exception was when the Lakers won in 2001 at Philadelphia's First Union Center, but decided to hold the ceremony in their locker room. Two other home championship celebrations followed in the 1996 and 1997 Finals, this time at the similarly constructed but bigger (in capacity) United Center.

Rick Adelman and Phil Jackson coached teams would do battle 10 and 17 years later in the playoffs. In the 2002 Western Conference Finals, Jackson's Lakers defeated Adelman's Kings in what is considered one of the best NBA series of all time. In 2009, Jackson's Lakers won another series in seven games over Adelman's Rockets in the Western Conference Semifinals.
