= 1991–92 Portland Trail Blazers season =

NBA professional basketball team season

- Conference champions
- Division champions
- Head coach: Rick Adelman
- Arena: Memorial Coliseum

Results
- Record: 57–25 (.695)
- Place: Division: 1st (Pacific); Conference: 1st (Western)
- Playoff finish: NBA Finals (lost to Bulls 2–4)
- Stats at Basketball Reference

Local media
- Television: KOIN; Prime Sports Northwest
- Radio: KEX

The 1991–92 Portland Trail Blazers season was the 22nd season for the Portland Trail Blazers in the National Basketball Association.

== Season summary ==
=== Off-season ===
During the off-season, the Trail Blazers signed undrafted rookie point guard Robert Pack.

For the season, the Trail Blazers redesigned their primary logo, which featured their original logo of red and black lines curling into each other, next to the team name "Blazers" in black capitalized letters with red shadows. The team also redesigned their home and road uniforms, changing the lowercased team name to capitalized letters on the front of their jerseys, and adding a red trim, and their primary logo to the right leg of their shorts; the white home uniforms featured black and red side panels on the left leg of their shorts, while the black road uniforms featured white and red side panels.

The team's new primary logo, and new uniforms would both remain in use until 2002.

=== Regular season ===
The Trail Blazers struggled losing three of their first four games of the regular season, but soon recovered by winning 11 of their next 14 games. The team posted a six-game winning streak between January and February, and held a 32–14 record at the All-Star break. The Trail Blazers posted a seven-game winning streak in March, and won their second consecutive Pacific Division title with a 57–25 record, which earned them the first seed in the Western Conference; the team qualified for the NBA playoffs for the tenth consecutive year.

Clyde Drexler averaged 25.0 points, 6.6 rebounds, 6.7 assists and 1.8 steals per game, contributed 114 three-point field goals, and was named to the All-NBA First Team. In addition, Terry Porter averaged 18.1 points, 5.8 assists and 1.5 steals per game, and led the Trail Blazers with 128 three-point field goals, while Jerome Kersey provided the team with 12.6 points, 8.2 rebounds and 1.5 steals per game, sixth man Clifford Robinson contributed 12.4 points, 5.1 rebounds and 1.3 blocks per game off the bench, and Buck Williams provided with 11.3 points and 8.8 rebounds per game, and was named to the NBA All-Defensive Second Team. Meanwhile, Kevin Duckworth averaged 10.7 points and 6.1 rebounds per game, while off the bench, Danny Ainge contributed 9.7 points per game, second-year forward Alaa Abdelnaby provided with 6.1 points and 3.7 rebounds per game, Pack contributed 4.6 points per game, and Mark Bryant averaged 4.1 points and 3.6 rebounds per game.

During the NBA All-Star weekend at the Orlando Arena in Orlando, Florida, Drexler was selected for the 1992 NBA All-Star Game, as a member of the Western Conference All-Star team. Drexler also finished in second place in Most Valuable Player voting, behind Michael Jordan of the Chicago Bulls, while Williams finished tied in sixth place in Defensive Player of the Year voting, and head coach Rick Adelman finished tied in ninth place in Coach of the Year voting.

The Trail Blazers finished 22nd in the NBA in home-game attendance, with an attendance of 528,408 at the Memorial Coliseum during the regular season.

=== NBA playoffs ===
In the Western Conference First Round of the 1992 NBA playoffs, and for the second consecutive year, the Trail Blazers faced off against the 8th–seeded Los Angeles Lakers, a team that featured Byron Scott, Sedale Threatt and A.C. Green. The Lakers were without All-Star guard Magic Johnson, who had retired early into the regular season due to his HIV infection, and were also without All-Star forward James Worthy, and Sam Perkins due to season-ending injuries. The Trail Blazers won the first two games over the Lakers at home at the Memorial Coliseum, before losing Game 3 on the road in overtime, 121–119 at the Great Western Forum. Game 4 of the series was played at the Thomas & Mack Center in Paradise, Nevada, home of the NCAA's UNLV Runnin' Rebels basketball team, due to the 1992 Los Angeles riots; the Trail Blazers defeated the Lakers, 102–76 to win the series in four games. It was the first time that the Trail Blazers won an NBA playoff series over the Lakers since 1977, in which the team won an NBA championship; the Lakers had defeated the Trail Blazers in four playoff series since then, including most recently the 1991 Western Conference Finals.

In the Western Conference Semi-finals, the team faced off against the 4th–seeded Phoenix Suns, who were led by the All-Star trio of Kevin Johnson, Jeff Hornacek, and sixth man Dan Majerle. The Trail Blazers took a 2–0 series lead before losing Game 3 to the Suns on the road, 124–117 at the Arizona Veterans Memorial Coliseum. The Trail Blazers won Game 4 over the Suns on the road in double-overtime, 153–151 to take a 3–1 series lead, and then won Game 5 at the Memorial Coliseum, 118–106 to win the series in five games.

In the Western Conference Finals, and also for the second consecutive year, the Trail Blazers faced off against the 2nd–seeded, and Midwest Division champion Utah Jazz, who were led by the trio of All-Star forward Karl Malone, All-Star guard John Stockton, and Jeff Malone. The Trail Blazers won the first two games over the Jazz at the Memorial Coliseum, but then lost the next two games on the road, which included a Game 4 loss to the Jazz at the Delta Center, 121–112 as the Jazz evened the series. After winning Game 5 at the Memorial Coliseum in overtime, 127–121, the Trail Blazers won Game 6 over the Jazz at the Delta Center, 105–97 to win the series in six games, and earn their second trip to the NBA Finals in three years.

In the 1992 NBA Finals, the Trail Blazers faced off against the top–seeded, and defending NBA champion Bulls, who were led by the trio of Jordan, All-Star forward Scottie Pippen, and Horace Grant. The Trail Blazers lost Game 1 to the Bulls on the road, 122–89 at the Chicago Stadium, but managed to win Game 2 on the road in overtime, 115–104 to even the series. However, with the series tied at 2–2, the Trail Blazers lost Game 5 to the Bulls at home, 119–106 at the Memorial Coliseum, and then lost Game 6 at the Chicago Stadium by a score of 97–93, thus losing the series in six games, as the Bulls won their second consecutive NBA championship.

=== Aftermath ===
Following the season, Ainge signed as a free agent with the Phoenix Suns, and Pack was traded to the Denver Nuggets. As of 2026, this was the final season in which the Trail Blazers advanced to the NBA Finals.

== Draft picks ==
Round	Pick	Player	Position	Nationality	School/Club team
2	54	Marcus Kennedy	PF	United States	Eastern Michigan

== Roster ==
1991–92 Portland Trail Blazers roster
Players

Pos.	No.	Player	Height	Weight	DOB	From
C	31	Alaa Abdelnaby	6 ft 10 in (2.08 m)	240 lb (109 kg)	1968–06–24	Duke
SG	9	Danny Ainge	6 ft 4 in (1.93 m)	175 lb (79 kg)	1959–03–17	BYU
PF	2	Mark Bryant	6 ft 9 in (2.06 m)	245 lb (111 kg)	1965–04–25	Seton Hall
C	42	Wayne Cooper	6 ft 10 in (2.08 m)	220 lb (100 kg)	1956–11–16	LSU New Orleans
SG	22	Clyde Drexler	6 ft 7 in (2.01 m)	210 lb (95 kg)	1962–06–22	Houston
C	00	Kevin Duckworth	7 ft 0 in (2.13 m)	275 lb (125 kg)	1964–04–01	Eastern Illinois
SF	25	Jerome Kersey	6 ft 7 in (2.01 m)	215 lb (98 kg)	1962–06–26	Longwood
PG	14	Robert Pack	6 ft 2 in (1.88 m)	180 lb (82 kg)	1969–02–03	USC
PG	30	Terry Porter	6 ft 3 in (1.91 m)	195 lb (88 kg)	1963–04–08	UW–Stevens Point
PF	3	Clifford Robinson	6 ft 10 in (2.08 m)	225 lb (102 kg)	1966–12–16	Connecticut
SG	12	Lamont Strothers	6 ft 4 in (1.93 m)	195 lb (88 kg)	1968–05–10	Christopher Newport
SG	8	Ennis Whatley	6 ft 3 in (1.91 m)	177 lb (80 kg)	1962–08–11	Alabama
PF	52	Buck Williams	6 ft 8 in (2.03 m)	215 lb (98 kg)	1960–03–08	Maryland

Coaches
Head coach
- Rick Adelman
Assistant(s)
- Jack Schalow
- John Wetzel

Legend
- (DP) Unsigned draft pick
- (FA) Free agent
- (S) Suspended
- Injured

== Regular season ==
=== Season standings ===
Pacific Division	W	L	PCT	GB	Home	Road	Div
y-Portland Trail Blazers	57	25	.695	—	33–8	24–17	21–9
x-Golden State Warriors	55	27	.671	2	31–10	24–17	19–11
x-Phoenix Suns	53	29	.646	4	36–5	17–24	17–13
x-Seattle SuperSonics	47	35	.573	10	28–13	19–22	16–14
x-Los Angeles Clippers	45	37	.549	12	29–12	16–25	13–17
x-Los Angeles Lakers	43	39	.524	14	24–17	19–22	13–17
Sacramento Kings	29	53	.354	28	21–20	8–33	6–24

y – clinched division title
x – clinched playoff spot

#	Western Conference				
#	Team	W	L	PCT	GB
1	c-Portland Trail Blazers	57	25	.695	–
2	y-Utah Jazz	55	27	.671	2
3	x-Golden State Warriors	55	27	.671	2
4	x-Phoenix Suns	53	29	.646	4
5	x-San Antonio Spurs	47	35	.573	10
6	x-Seattle SuperSonics	47	35	.573	10
7	x-Los Angeles Clippers	45	37	.549	12
8	x-Los Angeles Lakers	43	39	.524	14
9	Houston Rockets	42	40	.512	15
10	Sacramento Kings	29	53	.354	28
11	Denver Nuggets	24	58	.293	33
12	Dallas Mavericks	22	60	.268	35
13	Minnesota Timberwolves	15	67	.183	42

z – clinched division title
y – clinched division title
x – clinched playoff spot

== Playoffs ==
1992 playoff game log
First round: 3–1 (home: 2–0; road: 1–1)

Game	Date	Team	Score	High points	High rebounds	High assists	Location Attendance	Series
1	April 23	L.A. Lakers	W 115–102	Clifford Robinson (24)	Buck Williams (13)	Clyde Drexler (10)	Memorial Coliseum; 12,888	1–0
2	April 25	L.A. Lakers	W 101–79	Kevin Duckworth (19)	Buck Williams (12)	Terry Porter (6)	Memorial Coliseum; 12,888	2–0
3	April 29	@ L.A. Lakers	L 119–121 (OT)	Clyde Drexler (42)	Buck Williams (13)	Clyde Drexler (12)	Great Western Forum; 16,690	2–1
4	May 3	@ L.A. Lakers	W 102–76	Clyde Drexler (26)	Buck Williams (11)	Clyde Drexler (7)	Thomas & Mack Center; 15,478	3–1

Conference Semi-finals: 4–1 (home: 3–0; road: 1–1)

Game	Date	Team	Score	High points	High rebounds	High assists	Location Attendance	Series
1	May 5	Phoenix	W 113–111	Terry Porter (31)	Clyde Drexler (10)	Terry Porter (7)	Memorial Coliseum; 12,888	1–0
2	May 7	Phoenix	W 126–119	Porter, Drexler (27)	Jerome Kersey (9)	Clyde Drexler (13)	Memorial Coliseum; 12,888	2–0
3	May 9	@ Phoenix	L 117–124	Clyde Drexler (37)	Jerome Kersey (9)	Terry Porter (11)	Arizona Veterans Memorial Coliseum; 14,496	2–1
4	May 11	@ Phoenix	W 153–151 (2OT)	Clyde Drexler (33)	Jerome Kersey (10)	Terry Porter (14)	Arizona Veterans Memorial Coliseum; 14,496	3–1
5	May 14	Phoenix	W 118–106	Clyde Drexler (34)	Kersey, Williams (12)	Drexler, Kersey (8)	Memorial Coliseum; 12,888	4–1

Conference finals: 4–2 (home: 3–0; road: 1–2)

Game	Date	Team	Score	High points	High rebounds	High assists	Location Attendance	Series
1	May 16	Utah	W 113–88	Terry Porter (26)	Buck Williams (8)	Drexler, Porter (8)	Memorial Coliseum; 12,888	1–0
2	May 19	Utah	W 119–102	Terry Porter (41)	Duckworth, Robinson (7)	Clyde Drexler (12)	Memorial Coliseum; 12,888	2–0
3	May 22	@ Utah	L 89–97	Drexler, Kersey (26)	Kersey, Williams (9)	Drexler, Porter (7)	Delta Center; 19,911	2–1
4	May 24	@ Utah	L 112–121	Terry Porter (34)	Jerome Kersey (8)	Terry Porter (7)	Delta Center; 19,911	2–2
5	May 26	Utah	W 127–121 (OT)	Jerome Kersey (29)	Buck Williams (12)	Terry Porter (12)	Memorial Coliseum; 12,888	3–2
6	May 28	@ Utah	W 105–97	three players tied (18)	Buck Williams (8)	Terry Porter (10)	Delta Center; 19,911	4–2

NBA Finals: 2–4 (home: 1–2; road: 1–2)

Game	Date	Team	Score	High points	High rebounds	High assists	Location Attendance	Series
1	June 3	@ Chicago	L 89–122	Drexler, Robinson (16)	Jerome Kersey (7)	Clyde Drexler (7)	Chicago Stadium; 18,676	0–1
2	June 5	@ Chicago	W 115–104 (OT)	Clyde Drexler (26)	Buck Williams (14)	Clyde Drexler (8)	Chicago Stadium; 18,676	1–1
3	June 7	Chicago	L 84–94	Clyde Drexler (32)	Jerome Kersey (12)	Terry Porter (4)	Memorial Coliseum; 12,888	1–2
4	June 10	Chicago	W 93–88	Drexler, Kersey (21)	Kevin Duckworth (11)	Clyde Drexler (9)	Memorial Coliseum; 12,888	2–2
5	June 12	Chicago	L 106–119	Clyde Drexler (30)	Jerome Kersey (12)	Terry Porter (8)	Memorial Coliseum; 12,888	2–3
6	June 14	@ Chicago	L 93–97	Drexler, Kersey (24)	Jerome Kersey (9)	Terry Porter (8)	Chicago Stadium; 18,678	2–4

1992 schedule

== Player statistics ==
Legend
GP	Games played	GS	Games started	MPG	Minutes per game
FG%	Field-goal percentage	3P%	3-point field-goal percentage	FT%	Free-throw percentage
RPG	Rebounds per game	APG	Assists per game	SPG	Steals per game
BPG	Blocks per game	PPG	Points per game

=== Regular season ===
Player	GP	GS	MPG	FG%	3P%	FT%	RPG	APG	SPG	BPG	PPG
Terry Porter	82	82	34.0	.461	.395	.856	3.1	5.8	1.5	.1	18.1
Kevin Duckworth	82	82	27.1	.461	.000	.690	6.1	1.2	.5	.5	10.7
Clifford Robinson	82	7	25.9	.466	.091	.664	5.1	1.7	1.0	1.3	12.4
Danny Ainge	81	6	19.7	.442	.339	.824	1.8	2.5	.9	.2	9.7
Buck Williams	80	80	31.5	.604	.000	.754	8.8	1.4	.8	.5	11.3
Jerome Kersey	77	76	33.2	.467	.125	.664	8.2	3.2	1.5	.9	12.6
Clyde Drexler	76	76	36.2	.470	.337	.794	6.6	6.7	1.8	.9	25.0
Robert Pack	72	0	12.4	.423	.000	.803	1.3	1.9	.6	.1	4.6
Alaa Abdelnaby	71	1	13.2	.493		.752	3.7	.4	.4	.2	6.1
Mark Bryant	56	0	14.3	.480	.000	.667	3.6	.7	.5	.1	4.1
Wayne Cooper	35	0	9.8	.427		.636	2.9	.6	.1	.8	2.2
Ennis Whatley	23	0	9.1	.412	.000	.871	.9	1.5	.6	.1	3.0
Danny Young^{†}	18	0	7.4	.400	.300	.714	.5	1.1	.3	.0	2.5
Lamont Strothers	4	0	4.3	.333	.000	.500	.3	.3	.3	.3	2.5

=== Playoffs ===
Player	GP	GS	MPG	FG%	3P%	FT%	RPG	APG	SPG	BPG	PPG
Terry Porter	21	21	41.4	.516	.474	.832	4.6	6.7	1.0	.1	21.4
Clyde Drexler	21	21	40.3	.466	.235	.807	7.4	7.0	1.5	1.0	26.3
Buck Williams	21	21	36.1	.508		.758	8.5	1.0	1.3	.8	9.6
Jerome Kersey	21	21	36.0	.510	.000	.693	7.7	3.6	2.0	.9	16.2
Kevin Duckworth	21	21	30.8	.495		.660	5.6	2.0	.5	.6	11.9
Clifford Robinson	21	0	24.9	.462	.167	.571	4.2	2.0	1.0	1.0	10.8
Danny Ainge	21	0	21.4	.479	.404	.830	1.9	2.3	.7	.0	10.6
Ennis Whatley	15	0	6.4	.300	.000	1.000	.7	.9	.5	.0	1.1
Robert Pack	14	0	3.7	.222		.750	.4	.5	.4	.1	.8
Mark Bryant	12	0	9.7	.345		.750	2.4	.1	.3	.0	1.9
Alaa Abdelnaby	8	0	3.1	.500		.500	.5	.3	.0	.0	1.5
Wayne Cooper	3	0	9.0	.500			2.7	.0	.0	1.0	1.3

- ^{†} Denotes player spent time with another team in the season. Stats reflect time with the Trail Blazers only.

Player statistics citation:

== Awards and records ==
- Clyde Drexler, All-NBA First Team
- Buck Williams, NBA All-Defensive Second Team
