= Bob Thornton =

American basketball player and coach (born 1962)

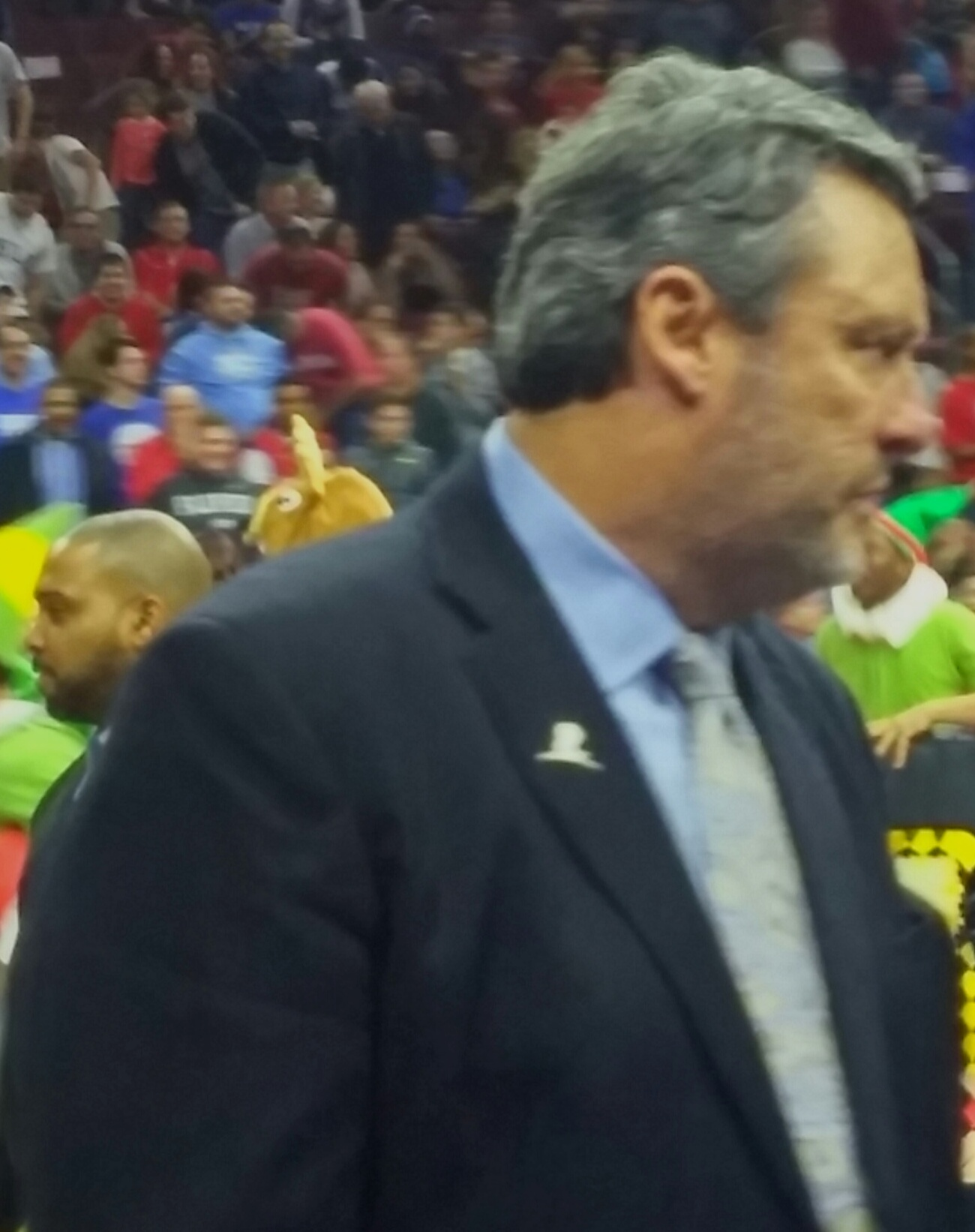

Personal information
- Born: July 10, 1962 (age 64) Los Angeles, California, U.S.
- Listed height: 6 ft 10 in (2.08 m)
- Listed weight: 225 lb (102 kg)

Career information
- High school: Mission Viejo (Mission Viejo, California)
- College: Saddleback College (1980–1981); UC Irvine (1981–1984)
- NBA draft: 1984: 4th round, 87th overall pick
- Drafted by: New York Knicks
- Playing career: 1984–1996
- Position: Power forward / center
- Number: 23, 45, 23, 33, 34
- Coaching career: 1997–present

Career history

Playing
- 1984–1985: Caja Madrid
- 1985–1987: New York Knicks
- 1987–1989: Philadelphia 76ers
- 1990–1991: Minnesota Timberwolves
- 1991–1992: Sioux Falls Skyforce
- 1992: Tissino Assicurazione Siena
- 1992: Utah Jazz
- 1992–1993: Fernet Branca Pavia
- 1993–1994: Olitalia Siena
- 1994: Teorematour Roma
- 1994: Tonno Auriga Trapani
- 1995–1996: Chicago Rockers
- 1996: Washington Bullets

Coaching
- 1997–1998: Chapman (assistant)
- 1998–1999: Cal State Fullerton (assistant)
- 1999–2000: Yakima Sun Kings (assistant)
- 2000–2001: Quad City Thunder
- 2001–2002: Huntsville Flight
- 2002–2004: Chicago Bulls (assistant)
- 2005–2007: Minnesota Timberwolves (assistant)
- 2007–2012: Oklahoma City Thunder (scout)
- 2011–2016: Memphis Grizzlies (assistant)
- 2016–2019: Sacramento Kings (assistant)
- 2021: Perth Wildcats (assistant)
- 2021–2022: Mississippi State (women's assistant)

Career highlights
- As coach: NBL Cup winner (2021)
- Stats at NBA.com
- Stats at Basketball Reference

Robert George Thornton (born July 10, 1962) is an American basketball coach and former player who played nine seasons in the National Basketball Association (NBA). He last served as the lead assistant coach for the Perth Wildcats in the Australian NBL.

Thornton played college basketball at University of California, Irvine and Saddleback Community College, and was selected by the New York Knicks with the 87th pick of the 1984 NBA draft.

Thornton played for five NBA teams (New York Knicks, Philadelphia 76ers, Minnesota Timberwolves, Utah Jazz and Washington Wizards) and averaged 3.0 points and 2.5 rebounds in 283 total games. He also played three seasons in the Italian A-1 league with Rome, Siena and Pavia.

He later held coaching positions with the CBA's Yakima Sun Kings and Quad City Thunder, the NBDL's Huntsville Flight, and the Chicago Bulls and Minnesota Timberwolves. From 2007 to 2011, he worked as an advance scout for the Oklahoma City Thunder. He was hired as an assistant coach by the Memphis Grizzlies on December 5, 2011.

In January 2021, Thornton moved to Australia to become lead assistant coach of the Perth Wildcats.

== Career statistics ==
Legend
GP	Games played	GS	Games started	MPG	Minutes per game
FG%	Field goal percentage	3P%	3-point field goal percentage	FT%	Free throw percentage
RPG	Rebounds per game	APG	Assists per game	SPG	Steals per game
BPG	Blocks per game	PPG	Points per game	**Bold**	Career high

=== NBA ===
==== Regular season ====
Year	Team	GP	GS	MPG	FG%	3P%	FT%	RPG	APG	SPG	BPG	PPG
1985–86	New York	**71**	**23**	**18.6**	.456	–	.531	**4.1**	**.6**	**.4**	.1	**4.7**
1986–87	New York	33	4	8.5	.433	.000	.650	1.7	.2	.1	.1	2.2
1987–88	New York	7	0	12.1	.316	–	.625	1.9	**.6**	.3	.0	2.4
1987–88	Philadelphia	41	2	12.4	**.532**	.000	.617	2.4	.3	.2	.1	3.6
1988–89	Philadelphia	54	0	8.3	.423	**.333**	.533	1.7	.3	.1	.1	2.4
1989–90	Philadelphia	56	0	10.6	.429	**.333**	.510	2.4	.3	**.4**	.2	2.2
1990–91	Minnesota	12	1	9.2	.308	–	.800	1.3	.1	.0	**.3**	1.3
1991–92	Utah	2	0	3.0	.143	–	**1.000**	1.0	.0	.0	.0	2.0
1995–96	Washington	7	0	4.4	.167	–	.500	1.7	.0	.1	.0	.4
Career		283	30	12.0	.444	.222	.558	2.5	.3	.3	.1	3.0

==== Playoffs ====
Year	Team	GP	GS	MPG	FG%	3P%	FT%	RPG	APG	SPG	BPG	PPG
1990	Philadelphia	**9**	0	**9.9**	.389	–	.500	**1.7**	**.4**	**.2**	**.1**	**2.1**
1992	Utah	7	0	4.6	**.400**	–	**.750**	1.3	.1	.0	.0	1.0
Career		16	0	7.6	.391	–	.571	1.5	.3	.1	.1	1.6
