= Buck Williams =

American basketball player & coach (born 1960)

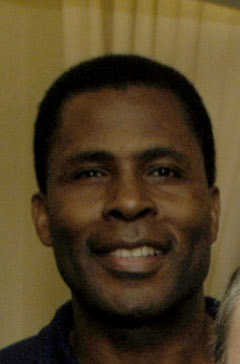
- Williams in 2006

Personal information
- Born: March 8, 1960 (age 66) Rocky Mount, North Carolina, U.S.
- Listed height: 6 ft 8 in (2.03 m)
- Listed weight: 225 lb (102 kg)

Career information
- High school: Rocky Mount (Rocky Mount, North Carolina)
- College: Maryland (1978–1981)
- NBA draft: 1981: 1st round, 3rd overall pick
- Drafted by: New Jersey Nets
- Playing career: 1981–1998
- Position: Power forward
- Number: 52

Career history
- 1981–1989: New Jersey Nets
- 1989–1996: Portland Trail Blazers
- 1996–1998: New York Knicks

Career highlights
- 3× NBA All-Star (1982, 1983, 1986); All-NBA Second Team (1983); 2× NBA All-Defensive First Team (1990, 1991); 2× NBA All-Defensive Second Team (1988, 1992); NBA Rookie of the Year (1982); NBA All-Rookie First Team (1982); No. 52 retired by Brooklyn Nets; 2× Second-team All-ACC (1980, 1981); ACC Rookie of the Year (1979); ACC All-Rookie Team (1979)

Career NBA statistics
- Points: 16,784 (12.8 ppg)
- Rebounds: 13,017 (10.0 rpg)
- Assists: 1,646 (1.3 apg)
- Stats at NBA.com
- Stats at Basketball Reference

Charles Linwood "Buck" Williams (born March 8, 1960) is an American former professional basketball player and former assistant coach for the Portland Trail Blazers. He was well known for his rebounding ability and trademark goggles.

Williams, a 6 ft 8 in (2.03 m) power forward born in Rocky Mount, North Carolina, ranks 16th all-time in National Basketball Association (NBA) career rebounds. His 17-year NBA career was highlighted by three All-Star Game appearances, a Rookie of the Year award, an All-Rookie team selection, an All-NBA second team selection and four selections to the first and second NBA All-Defensive teams. Williams led the Nets in rebounding for most of the 1980s and as of the beginning of 2017, he remains the Nets’ all-time leader in total rebounds (7,576), games played (635), minutes played (23,100), rebounds per game (11.9), and free throws made (2,476).

== High school and college career ==
Williams attended Rocky Mount High School (then called Rocky Mount Senior High) in Rocky Mount, North Carolina before going off to play collegiately at the University of Maryland. While at Rocky Mount, he helped lead the basketball team to the 1978 North Carolina 4A state title and was also named MVP of the state championship game.

He had immediate success in college at Maryland, capturing the ACC Rookie of the Year Award in 1979. Williams led the ACC in rebounding twice (1979 and 1981), while averaging 15.5 points per game in his sophomore and junior years. He earned All-ACC honors in 1980 and 1981. National recognition of his performances came when he was selected to the 1980 USA Olympic basketball team, alongside such players as later two-time NBA champions Isiah Thomas and Mark Aguirre; he, however, never got to represent the national colors in Moscow due to the United States’ boycott.

In 2001, he became a member of the University of Maryland's Athletic Hall of Fame. In 2002, Williams was one of eight former Maryland players to be named to the ACC 50th Anniversary men's basketball team.

== NBA career ==
=== New Jersey Nets (1981–1989) ===
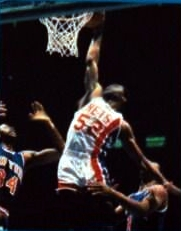
Williams (center) dunking the ball for the New Jersey Nets, circa 1987.

After three years at Maryland, Williams decided to leave for the NBA. The New Jersey Nets selected him third overall in the 1981 NBA draft, behind Olympic teammates Aguirre and Thomas. In his first season with the Nets, he averaged 15.5 points and led the team with 12.3 rebounds per game, helping New Jersey win 20 more games (a 44–38 win–loss record) than the previous year and earning 1982 Rookie of the Year honors. Williams established himself as a premier player at the power forward position over the next eight seasons with the Nets; in six of those he was ranked among the best three rebounders in the league, never averaging less than twelve rebounds per game. 1983–84 featured the Nets’ first playoff second-round appearance since the ABA–NBA merger in 1976, when they lost to the Milwaukee Bucks, and the Nets failed to subsequently get past the first round until 2002 when Jason Kidd led them to an unsuccessful NBA Finals date.

=== Portland Trail Blazers (1989–1996) ===
On June 24, 1989, the Nets traded Williams to the Portland Trail Blazers in exchange for Sam Bowie and a draft pick. In Portland, Williams would continue his solid play and take a complementary frontcourt role to established guard duo Clyde Drexler and Terry Porter. The Blazers’ post-season campaigns ended in the first round four consecutive seasons prior to 1990; contrastingly, Williams’ first three seasons with the Blazers were marked by three Western Conference Finals appearances and two NBA Finals. In 1990 the Blazers succumbed to the powerhouse Detroit Pistons in five games, while in 1992 they fell to the Chicago Bulls in six. Williams was regularly in the starting lineup for the first six of his seven seasons with the Blazers. He is 5th all-time on the franchise career list for both field goal percentage (55.0%) and total rebounds (4861) as of September 2018.

=== New York Knicks (1996–1998) ===
In the twilight of his career, after the 1995–96 season, Williams moved back to the Atlantic Division, signing with the New York Knicks, where he played in a much more limited capacity, behind the frontcourt duo of Patrick Ewing and Charles Oakley. He spent two years with the Knicks, but was forced to miss 41 games during the 1997–98 season due to knee surgery (the first time in his career he missed more than 12 games in a season). Williams announced his retirement on January 27, 1999, holding career averages of 12.8 points and ten rebounds per game and a field goal average of 54.9 percent. During the course of his 17-year NBA career, Williams racked up more than 16,000 points and 13,000 rebounds — the seventh NBA player to reach both marks.

== NBA career statistics ==
Legend
GP	Games played	GS	Games started	MPG	Minutes per game
FG%	Field goal percentage	3P%	3-point field goal percentage	FT%	Free throw percentage
RPG	Rebounds per game	APG	Assists per game	SPG	Steals per game
BPG	Blocks per game	PPG	Points per game	**Bold**	Career high
*	Led the league

=== Regular season ===
Year	Team	GP	GS	MPG	FG%	3P%	FT%	RPG	APG	SPG	BPG	PPG
1981–82	New Jersey	**82**	**82**	34.5	.582	.000	.624	12.3	1.3	1.0	1.0	15.5
1982–83	New Jersey	**82**	**82**	36.1	.588	.000	.620	**12.5**	1.5	**1.1**	1.3	17.0
1983–84	New Jersey	81	81	37.1	.535	.000	.570	12.3	1.6	1.0	**1.5**	15.7
1984–85	New Jersey	**82**	**82**	**38.8**	.530	.250	.625	12.3	**2.0**	.8	1.3	18.2
1985–86	New Jersey	**82**	**82**	37.4	.523	.000	.676	12.0	1.6	.9	1.2	15.9
1986–87	New Jersey	**82**	**82**	36.3	.557	.000	.731	**12.5**	1.6	1.0	1.1	18.0
1987–88	New Jersey	70	70	37.7	.560	**1.000**	.668	11.9	1.6	1.0	.6	**18.3**
1988–89	New Jersey	74	72	33.1	.531	.000	.666	9.4	1.1	.8	.5	13.0
1989–90	Portland	**82**	**82**	34.2	.548	.000	.706	9.8	1.4	.8	.5	13.6
1990–91	Portland	80	80	32.3	.602*	—	.705	9.4	1.2	.6	.6	11.7
1991–92	Portland	80	80	31.5	**.604***	.000	**.754**	8.8	1.4	.8	.5	11.3
1992–93	Portland	**82**	**82**	30.5	.511	.000	.645	8.4	.9	1.0	.7	8.3
1993–94	Portland	81	81	32.5	.555	.000	.679	10.4	1.0	.7	.6	9.7
1994–95	Portland	**82***	**82***	29.5	.512	.500	.673	8.2	1.0	.8	.8	9.2
1995–96	Portland	70	10	23.9	.500	.667	.668	5.8	.6	.6	.7	7.3
1996–97	New York	74	4	20.2	.537	.000	.642	5.4	.7	.5	.5	6.3
1997–98	New York	41	6	18.0	.503	—	732	4.5	.5	.4	.4	4.9
Career		1,307	1,140	32.5	.549	.167	.664	10.0	1.3	.8	.8	12.8
All-Star		3	0	20.3	.526	—	.455	8.0	2.0	.3	.7	8.3

=== Playoffs ===
Year	Team	GP	GS	MPG	FG%	3P%	FT%	RPG	APG	SPG	BPG	PPG
1982	New Jersey	2	—	39.5	.538	—	.467	10.5	1.5	.5	1.0	17.5
1983	New Jersey	2	—	42.5	.500	—	.800	11.5	**2.0**	1.0	1.0	19.0
1984	New Jersey	11	—	**43.0**	.485	—	.556	**14.1**	1.5	1.5	1.5	15.5
1985	New Jersey	3	3	41.0	.650	—	.733	10.7	.3	1.0	**1.7**	**24.7**
1986	New Jersey	3	3	42.0	**.724**	—	.769	10.3	.7	**2.0**	.3	20.7
1990	Portland	**21**	**21**	37.0	.508	—	.676	9.2	1.9	.6	.3	13.0
1991	Portland	16	16	37.0	.500	—	.603	8.9	.9	.6	.3	10.3
1992	Portland	**21**	**21**	36.1	.508	—	.758	8.5	1.0	1.3	.8	9.6
1993	Portland	4	4	36.1	.478	—	.684	7.3	.3	.3	.8	8.8
1994	Portland	4	4	36.1	.679	—	**.867**	8.8	.5	1.0	.5	12.8
1995	Portland	3	3	36.1	.600	—	.636	6.3	.3	1.3	.7	8.3
1996	Portland	5	1	26.6	.391	**.500**	.714	5.0	.2	.2	.8	4.8
1997	New York	10	1	19.3	.486	—	.529	4.0	.6	.3	.4	4.3
1998	New York	3	0	15.0	.444	—	.750	5.3	.3	.0	.3	4.7
Career		108	77	34.4	.520	.500	.672	8.7	1.0	.8	.6	11.2

== After basketball ==
Williams served as the president of the NBA Players Association from 1994 to 1997. The Nets retired his #52 jersey in April 1999. In 2006, he was named as an inductee into the Rocky Mount Twin County Hall of Fame. In 2018, he was named to the Maryland State Athletic Hall of Fame.

== Coaching career ==
In July 2010, Williams was hired by Nate McMillan as an assistant coach for the Portland Trail Blazers.

== See also ==
- List of NBA career games played leaders
- List of NBA career rebounding leaders
- List of NBA career turnovers leaders
- List of NBA career personal fouls leaders
- List of NBA career minutes played leaders
- List of NBA career field goal percentage leaders
