= 1991–92 Utah Jazz season =

NBA professional basketball team season

- Division champions
- Head coach: Jerry Sloan
- General manager: Tim Howells
- Owner: Larry H. Miller
- Arena: Delta Center

Results
- Record: 55–27 (.671)
- Place: Division: 1st (Midwest); Conference: 2nd (Western)
- Playoff finish: Western Conference finals (lost to Trail Blazers 2–4)
- Stats at Basketball Reference

Local media
- Television: KSTU; Prime Sports Intermountain West
- Radio: KSOP

The 1991–92 Utah Jazz season was the 18th season for the Utah Jazz in the National Basketball Association, and their 13th season in Salt Lake City, Utah. It was also the first time since the 1979–80 season that Darrell Griffith was not on the team's opening day roster.

== Season summary ==
=== Off-season ===
For the season, the Jazz moved into their new arena known as the Delta Center. The Jazz had the 21st overall pick in the 1991 NBA draft, and selected point guard Eric Murdock out of Providence College.

=== Regular season ===
The Jazz played around .500 in winning percentage with a 7–6 start to the regular season. In late November, the team traded their long-time forward, and sixth man Thurl Bailey to the Minnesota Timberwolves in exchange for Tyrone Corbin. With the addition of Corbin, the Jazz held a 31–18 record at the All-Star break, posted a six-game winning streak in February, and won their final seven games of the season. The Jazz finished in first place in the Midwest Division with a 55–27 record, and earned the second seed in the Western Conference; the team qualified for the NBA playoffs for the ninth consecutive year.

Karl Malone averaged 28.0 points, 11.2 rebounds and 1.3 steals per game, and was named to the All-NBA First Team, while Jeff Malone finished second on the team in scoring averaging 20.2 points per game, and John Stockton provided the team with 15.8 points, 13.7 assists and 3.0 steals per game, leading the league in assists for the fifth consecutive season, as he was named to the All-NBA Second Team, and to the NBA All-Defensive Second Team. In addition, Blue Edwards contributed 12.6 points per game, while off the bench, Corbin played a sixth man role, averaging 9.0 points and 5.8 rebounds per game in 69 games after the trade, Mike Brown provided with 7.7 points and 5.8 rebounds per game, undrafted rookie small forward David Benoit contributed 5.6 points and 3.8 rebounds per game, and starting center Mark Eaton averaged 3.3 points, 6.1 rebounds and 2.5 blocks per game.

During the NBA All-Star weekend at the Orlando Arena in Orlando, Florida, Karl Malone and Stockton were both selected for the 1992 NBA All-Star Game, as members of the Western Conference All-Star team. In addition, Stockton also participated in the NBA Three-Point Shootout. Karl Malone finished in fourth place in Most Valuable Player voting, while Stockton finished tied in twelfth place; Malone also finished tied in sixth place in Defensive Player of the Year voting, while Corbin finished tied in fourth place in Sixth Man of the Year voting, and head coach Jerry Sloan finished tied in ninth place in Coach of the Year voting.

The Jazz finished third in the NBA in home-game attendance, with an attendance of 806,663 at the Delta Center during the regular season.

=== NBA playoffs ===
In the Western Conference First Round of the 1992 NBA playoffs, the Jazz faced off against the 7th–seeded Los Angeles Clippers, a team that featured Danny Manning, Ron Harper and Doc Rivers. The Jazz won the first two games over the Clippers at home at the Delta Center, before losing Game 3 on the road, 98–88 at the Los Angeles Memorial Sports Arena. Game 4 of the series was played at the Anaheim Convention Center in Anaheim, California, due to the 1992 Los Angeles riots; the Jazz lost to the Clippers by a score of 115–107. With the series tied at 2–2, the Jazz won Game 5 over the Clippers at the Delta Center, 98–89 to win the series in five games.

In the Western Conference Semi-finals, the team faced off against the 6th–seeded Seattle SuperSonics, who were led by All-Star guard Ricky Pierce, sixth man Eddie Johnson, and Shawn Kemp. The Jazz won the first two games at the Delta Center, but then lost Game 3 to the SuperSonics on the road, 104–98 at the Seattle Center Coliseum. The Jazz won the next two games over the SuperSonics, which included a Game 5 home win at the Delta Center, 111–100 to win the series in five games.

In their first appearance in the Western Conference Finals, and for the second consecutive year, the Jazz faced off against the top–seeded, and Pacific Division champion Portland Trail Blazers, a team that featured All-Star guard Clyde Drexler, All-Star guard Terry Porter, and Jerome Kersey. The Jazz lost the first two games to the Trail Blazers on the road at the Memorial Coliseum, but managed to win the next two games at home, including a Game 4 win over the Trail Blazers at the Delta Center, 121–112 to even the series. However, after losing Game 5 at the Memorial Coliseum in overtime, 127–121, the Jazz lost Game 6 to the Trail Blazers at the Delta Center, 105–97, thus losing the series in six games.

The Trail Blazers would lose in six games to the defending NBA champion Chicago Bulls in the 1992 NBA Finals.

=== Notable incidents ===
One notable incident of the regular season occurred on December 14, 1991, during a home game against the Detroit Pistons at the Delta Center. Early in the first quarter, Karl Malone committed a flagrant foul on All-Star guard Isiah Thomas, in which Malone hit Thomas's forehead with his elbow; Thomas had to receive 40 stitches, while Malone was suspended for one game. The Jazz defeated the Pistons by a score of 102–100.

=== Aftermath ===
Following the season, Edwards and Murdock were both traded to the Milwaukee Bucks on draft day.

== Draft picks ==
Round	Pick	Player	Position	Nationality	College
1	21	Eric Murdock	PG	United States	Providence
2	48	Isaac Austin	C	United States	Arizona State

== Roster ==
1991–92 Utah Jazz roster
Players

Pos.	No.	Player	Height	Weight	DOB	From
C	50	Isaac Austin	6 ft 10 in (2.08 m)	255 lb (116 kg)	1969–08–18	Arizona State
SF	21	David Benoit	6 ft 8 in (2.03 m)	220 lb (100 kg)	1968–05–09	Alabama
C	40	Mike Brown	6 ft 9 in (2.06 m)	257 lb (117 kg)	1963–07–19	George Washington
SF	23	Tyrone Corbin	6 ft 6 in (1.98 m)	210 lb (95 kg)	1962–12–31	DePaul
SF	15	Corey Crowder	6 ft 5 in (1.96 m)	214 lb (97 kg)	1969–04–13	Kentucky Wesleyan
C	53	Mark Eaton	7 ft 4 in (2.24 m)	275 lb (125 kg)	1957–01–24	UCLA
SF	30	Blue Edwards	6 ft 4 in (1.93 m)	200 lb (91 kg)	1965–10–31	East Carolina
SG	24	Jeff Malone	6 ft 4 in (1.93 m)	205 lb (93 kg)	1961–06–28	Mississippi State
PF	32	Karl Malone	6 ft 9 in (2.06 m)	250 lb (113 kg)	1963–07–24	Louisiana Tech
PG	14	Eric Murdock	6 ft 1 in (1.85 m)	190 lb (86 kg)	1968–06–14	Providence
SG	11	Delaney Rudd	6 ft 2 in (1.88 m)	180 lb (82 kg)	1962–11–08	Wake Forest
PG	12	John Stockton	6 ft 1 in (1.85 m)	170 lb (77 kg)	1962–03–26	Gonzaga
PF	33	Bob Thornton	6 ft 10 in (2.08 m)	225 lb (102 kg)	1962–07–10	UC Irvine

Coaches
Head coach
- Jerry Sloan
Assistant(s)
- Gordon Chiesa
- David Fredman
- Phil Johnson

Legend
- (DP) Unsigned draft pick
- (FA) Free agent
- (S) Suspended
- Injured

Roster
Updated: April 15, 1992

== Regular season ==
=== Season standings ===
Midwest Division	W	L	PCT	GB	Home	Road	Div
y-Utah Jazz	55	27	.671	—	37–4	18–23	20–6
x-San Antonio Spurs	47	35	.573	8	31–10	16–25	18–8
Houston Rockets	42	40	.512	13	28–13	14–27	12–14
Denver Nuggets	24	58	.293	31	18–23	6–35	8–18
Dallas Mavericks	22	60	.268	33	15–26	7–34	11–15
Minnesota Timberwolves	15	67	.183	40	9–32	6–35	9–17

y – clinched division title
x – clinched playoff spot

#	Western Conference				
#	Team	W	L	PCT	GB
1	c-Portland Trail Blazers	57	25	.695	–
2	y-Utah Jazz	55	27	.671	2
3	x-Golden State Warriors	55	27	.671	2
4	x-Phoenix Suns	53	29	.646	4
5	x-San Antonio Spurs	47	35	.573	10
6	x-Seattle SuperSonics	47	35	.573	10
7	x-Los Angeles Clippers	45	37	.549	12
8	x-Los Angeles Lakers	43	39	.524	14
9	Houston Rockets	42	40	.512	15
10	Sacramento Kings	29	53	.354	28
11	Denver Nuggets	24	58	.293	33
12	Dallas Mavericks	22	60	.268	35
13	Minnesota Timberwolves	15	67	.183	42

z – clinched division title
y – clinched division title
x – clinched playoff spot

== Game log ==
=== Regular season ===
1991–92 game log
Total: 55–27 (home: 37–4; road: 18–23)
November: 9–7 (home: 5–1; road: 4–6)

Game	Date	Team	Score	High points	High rebounds	High assists	Location Attendance	Record
1	November 1	@ Minnesota	W 112–97				Target Center	1–0
2	November 2	@ Indiana	L 112–127				Market Square Arena	1–1
3	November 5	@ Atlanta	L 94–98				The Omni	1–2
4	November 7	Seattle	L 95–103				Delta Center	1–3
5	November 9	L.A. Clippers	W 101–84				Delta Center	2–3
6	November 11	Sacramento	W 106–90				Delta Center	3–3
7	November 13	@ New Jersey	W 98–92				Brendan Byrne Arena	4–3
8	November 15	@ Detroit	L 115–123				Palace of Auburn Hills	4–4
9	November 16	@ Washington	W 107–98				Capital Centre	5–4
10	November 19	@ Miami	L 91–111				Miami Arena	5–5
11	November 20	@ Orlando	W 107–102				Orlando Arena	6–5
12	November 22	Denver	W 121–96				Delta Center	7–5
13	November 23	@ Dallas	L 109–121 (OT)				Reunion Arena	7–6
14	November 27	Charlotte	W 113–107				Delta Center	8–6
15	November 29	Golden State	W 135–108				Delta Center	9–6
16	November 30	@ Phoenix	L 125–134 (OT)				Arizona Veterans Memorial Coliseum	9–7

December: 10–5 (home: 5–0; road: 5–5)

Game	Date	Team	Score	High points	High rebounds	High assists	Location Attendance	Record
17	December 3	@ Golden State	L 103–108				Oakland–Alameda County Coliseum Arena	9–8
18	December 4	Washington	W 101–74				Delta Center	10–8
19	December 6	@ San Antonio	W 93–92				HemisFair Arena	11–8
20	December 7	@ Houston	W 96–91				The Summit	12–8
21	December 10	Orlando	W 122–103				Delta Center	13–8
22	December 11	@ L.A. Lakers	W 101–95				Great Western Forum	14–8
23	December 13	@ L.A. Clippers	L 101–102 (OT)				Los Angeles Memorial Sports Arena	14–9
24	December 14	Detroit	W 102–100				Delta Center	15–9
25	December 17	@ Charlotte	W 122–102				Charlotte Coliseum	16–9
26	December 18	@ Philadelphia	W 107–105				The Spectrum	17–9
27	December 20	@ Boston	L 101–112				Boston Garden	17–10
28	December 21	@ New York	L 97–106				Madison Square Garden	17–11
29	December 23	@ Cleveland	L 112–113				Richfield Coliseum	17–12
30	December 26	L.A. Clippers	W 123–115				Delta Center	18–12
31	December 28	Miami	W 128–103				Delta Center	19–12

January: 10–5 (home: 9–1; road: 1–4)

Game	Date	Team	Score	High points	High rebounds	High assists	Location Attendance	Record
32	January 2	Portland	W 107–103				Delta Center	20–12
33	January 4	Dallas	W 113–78				Delta Center	21–12
34	January 6	Indiana	W 124–108				Delta Center	22–12
35	January 8	@ Milwaukee	L 98–99				Bradley Center	22–13
36	January 10	@ Chicago	L 90–105				Chicago Stadium	22–14
37	January 11	@ Minnesota	L 96–101				Target Center	22–15
38	January 14	Minnesota	W 116–110				Delta Center	23–15
39	January 16	Atlanta	W 116–111				Delta Center	24–15
40	January 18	Houston	W 108–80				Delta Center	25–15
41	January 22	San Antonio	W 100–98				Delta Center	26–15
42	January 23	@ Denver	L 111–115				McNichols Sports Arena	26–16
43	January 25	@ Seattle	W 104–103				Seattle Center Coliseum	26–17
44	January 27	New York	L 80–97				Delta Center	27–17
45	January 29	Sacramento	W 124–105				Delta Center	28–17
46	January 31	Phoenix	W 117–116 (OT)				Delta Center	29–17

February: 9–3 (home: 7–1; road: 2–2)

Game	Date	Team	Score	High points	High rebounds	High assists	Location Attendance	Record
47	February 1	@ Dallas	W 104–90				Reunion Arena	30–17
48	February 3	Chicago	W 126–123 (3OT)				Delta Center	31–17
49	February 5	@ Sacramento	L 98–100				ARCO Arena	31–18
All-Star Break
50	February 11	Cleveland	W 111–109				Delta Center	32–18
51	February 13	L.A. Lakers	W 97–91				Delta Center	33–18
52	February 15	Denver	W 106–93				Delta Center	34–18
53	February 17	Boston	W 88–83				Delta Center	35–18
54	February 19	Dallas	W 118–96				Delta Center	36–18
55	February 21	Houston	W 124–97				Delta Center	37–18
56	February 24	@ Portland	L 107–110				Memorial Coliseum	37–19
57	February 25	@ L.A. Clippers	W 106–101				Los Angeles Memorial Sports Arena	38–19
58	February 27	Seattle	L 124–130 (OT)				Delta Center	38–20

March: 9–5 (home: 6–1; road: 3–4)

Game	Date	Team	Score	High points	High rebounds	High assists	Location Attendance	Record
59	March 1	@ Phoenix	L 109–114				Arizona Veterans Memorial Coliseum	38–21
60	March 3	@ Golden State	W 123–101				Oakland–Alameda County Coliseum Arena	39–21
61	March 4	San Antonio	W 102–93				Delta Center	40–21
62	March 6	New Jersey	W 117–96				Delta Center	41–21
63	March 8	@ Denver	W 112–88				McNichols Sports Arena	42–21
64	March 12	@ Sacramento	W 114–103				ARCO Arena	43–21
65	March 14	@ San Antonio	L 106–113				HemisFair Arena	43–22
66	March 15	@ Houston	L 97–106				The Summit	43–23
67	March 19	Denver	W 115–100				Delta Center	44–23
68	March 21	Portland	W 95–77				Delta Center	45–23
69	March 25	Philadelphia	W 100–94				Delta Center	46–23
70	March 27	L.A. Lakers	L 92–103				Delta Center	46–24
71	March 30	Milwaukee	W 120–100				Delta Center	47–24
72	March 31	@ Seattle	L 103–122				Seattle Center Coliseum	47–25

April: 8–2 (home: 5–0; road: 3–2)

Game	Date	Team	Score	High points	High rebounds	High assists	Location Attendance	Record
73	April 2	@ Portland	L 86–118				Memorial Coliseum	47–26
74	April 3	Phoenix	W 113–94				Delta Center	48–26
75	April 5	@ Minnesota	L 91–93				Target Center	48–27
76	April 7	@ Denver	W 124–101				McNichols Sports Arena	49–27
77	April 9	Dallas	W 113–90				Delta Center	50–27
78	April 11	@ L.A. Lakers	W 93–90				Great Western Forum	51–27
79	April 13	Golden State	W 138–99				Delta Center	52–27
80	April 15	Houston	W 130–98				Delta Center	53–27
81	April 17	Minnesota	W 120–106				Delta Center	54–27
82	April 19	@ San Antonio	W 101–90				HemisFair Arena	55–27

1991–92 schedule

=== Playoffs ===
1992 playoff game log
First Round: 3–2 (home: 3–0; road: 0–2)

Game	Date	Team	Score	High points	High rebounds	High assists	Location Attendance	Series
1	April 24	L.A. Clippers	W 115–97	Karl Malone (32)	Karl Malone (10)	John Stockton (21)	Delta Center; 19,911	1–0
2	April 26	L.A. Clippers	W 103–92	Karl Malone (32)	Karl Malone (13)	John Stockton (19)	Delta Center; 19,911	2–0
3	April 28	@ L.A. Clippers	L 88–98	Karl Malone (22)	Karl Malone (10)	John Stockton (13)	Los Angeles Memorial Sports Arena; 14,086	2–1
4	May 3	@ L.A. Clippers	L 107–115	Karl Malone (44)	Karl Malone (11)	John Stockton (18)	Anaheim Convention Center; 7,148	2–2
5	May 4	L.A. Clippers	W 98–89	Jeff Malone (25)	Karl Malone (16)	John Stockton (9)	Delta Center; 19,911	3–2

Conference semifinals: 4–1 (home: 3–0; road: 1–1)

Game	Date	Team	Score	High points	High rebounds	High assists	Location Attendance	Series
1	May 6	Seattle	W 108–100	Karl Malone (30)	Karl Malone (10)	John Stockton (15)	Delta Center; 19,911	1–0
2	May 8	Seattle	W 103–97	Karl Malone (28)	Karl Malone (12)	John Stockton (14)	Delta Center; 19,911	2–0
3	May 10	@ Seattle	L 98–104	Karl Malone (30)	Karl Malone (8)	John Stockton (11)	Seattle Center Coliseum; 14,104	2–1
4	May 12	@ Seattle	W 89–83	Jeff Malone (24)	Karl Malone (8)	John Stockton (13)	Seattle Center Coliseum; 14,252	3–1
5	May 14	Seattle	W 111–100	Karl Malone (37)	Karl Malone (13)	John Stockton (17)	Delta Center; 19,911	4–1

Conference finals: 2–4 (home: 2–1; road: 0–3)

Game	Date	Team	Score	High points	High rebounds	High assists	Location Attendance	Series
1	May 16	@ Portland	L 88–113	Jeff Malone (15)	K. Malone, Thornton (7)	John Stockton (9)	Memorial Coliseum; 12,888	0–1
2	May 19	@ Portland	L 102–119	Karl Malone (25)	Karl Malone (11)	John Stockton (11)	Memorial Coliseum; 12,888	0–2
3	May 22	Portland	W 97–89	Karl Malone (39)	K. Malone, Eaton (7)	John Stockton (10)	Delta Center; 19,911	1–2
4	May 24	Portland	W 121–112	Karl Malone (33)	Karl Malone (12)	John Stockton (15)	Delta Center; 19,911	2–2
5	May 26	@ Portland	L 121–127 (OT)	Karl Malone (38)	Karl Malone (14)	John Stockton (10)	Memorial Coliseum; 12,888	2–3
6	May 28	Portland	L 97–105	Karl Malone (23)	Karl Malone (19)	John Stockton (12)	Delta Center; 19,911	2–4

1992 schedule

== Player statistics ==
Legend
GP	Games played	GS	Games started	MPG	Minutes per game
FG%	Field-goal percentage	3P%	3-point field-goal percentage	FT%	Free-throw percentage
RPG	Rebounds per game	APG	Assists per game	SPG	Steals per game
BPG	Blocks per game	PPG	Points per game

=== Season ===
Player	GP	GS	MPG	FG%	3FG%	FT%	RPG	APG	SPG	BPG	PPG
Karl Malone	81	81	37.7	.526	.176	.778	11.2	3.0	1.3	0.6	28.0
Jeff Malone	81	81	36.1	.511	.083	.898	2.9	2.2	0.7	0.1	20.2
John Stockton	82	82	36.6	.482	.407	.842	3.3	13.7	3.0	0.3	15.8
Blue Edwards	81	81	28.2	.522	.379	.774	3.7	1.7	1.0	0.6	12.6
Thurl Bailey	13	0	25.2	.386	.000	.800	6.0	1.5	0.4	1.2	9.4
Tyrone Corbin	69	1	27.0	.504	.000	.878	5.8	1.6	1.0	0.2	9.0
Mike Brown	82	1	21.7	.453	.000	.667	5.8	1.0	0.5	0.4	7.7
David Benoit	77	2	15.1	.467	.214	.810	3.8	0.4	0.2	0.6	5.6
Eric Murdock	50	0	9.6	.415	.192	.754	1.1	1.8	0.6	0.1	4.1
Mark Eaton	81	81	25.0	.446		.598	6.1	0.5	0.4	2.5	3.3
Delaney Rudd	65	0	8.3	.399	.234	.762	0.8	1.7	0.2	0.0	3.0
Corey Crowder	51	0	6.4	.384	.433	.833	0.8	0.3	0.1	0.0	2.2
Isaac Austin	31	0	3.6	.457		.633	1.1	0.2	0.1	0.1	2.0
Bob Thornton	2	0	3.0	.143		1.000	1.0	0.0	0.0	0.0	2.0

=== Playoffs ===
Player	GP	GS	MPG	FG%	3FG%	FT%	RPG	APG	SPG	BPG	PPG
Karl Malone	16	16	43.0	.521	.000	.805	11.3	2.6	1.4	1.2	29.1
Jeff Malone	16	16	38.1	.487	.333	.861	2.4	1.9	0.5	0.1	20.7
John Stockton	16	16	38.9	.423	.310	.833	2.9	13.6	2.1	0.3	14.8
Tyrone Corbin	16	0	27.9	.504	.000	.778	5.5	1.1	0.8	0.2	11.3
Blue Edwards	16	7	22.1	.468	.200	.719	3.2	1.1	1.4	0.2	8.1
David Benoit	13	9	19.8	.429	.462	1.000	3.8	0.5	0.5	0.4	6.8
Mike Brown	16	0	17.1	.400		.780	4.1	0.7	0.1	0.1	5.8
Mark Eaton	16	16	29.6	.565		.778	5.6	0.3	0.4	2.3	4.6
Eric Murdock	3	0	3.7	.600	.000	1.000	1.0	0.3	0.3	0.3	2.7
Delaney Rudd	10	0	8.4	.476	.286	.750	0.4	1.9	0.3	0.0	2.5
Corey Crowder	4	0	3.0	.556	.000	.000	0.5	0.3	0.3	0.0	2.5
Bob Thornton	7	0	4.6	.400		.750	1.3	0.1	0.0	0.0	1.0

Player statistics citation:

== Awards and records ==
- Karl Malone, All-NBA First Team
- John Stockton, All-NBA Second Team
- John Stockton, NBA All-Defensive Second Team

== See also ==
- 1991–92 NBA season
