= Jeff Malone =

American basketball player and coach (born 1961)

Personal information
- Born: June 28, 1961 (age 65) Mobile, Alabama, U.S.
- Listed height: 6 ft 4 in (1.93 m)
- Listed weight: 205 lb (93 kg)

Career information
- High school: Southwest (Macon, Georgia)
- College: Mississippi State (1979–1983)
- NBA draft: 1983: 1st round, 10th overall pick
- Drafted by: Washington Bullets
- Playing career: 1983–1997
- Position: Shooting guard
- Number: 24, 25
- Coaching career: 2000–2006

Career history

Playing
- 1983–1990: Washington Bullets
- 1990–1994: Utah Jazz
- 1994–1996: Philadelphia 76ers
- 1996: Miami Heat
- 1997: VAO

Career highlights
- 2× NBA All-Star (1986, 1987); NBA All-Rookie First Team (1984); Third-team All-American – NABC (1983); SEC Player of the Year – UPI (1983); First-team All-SEC (1983); 2× Second-team All-SEC (1981, 1982)

Career NBA statistics
- Points: 17,231 (19.0 ppg)
- Rebounds: 2,364 (2.6 rpg)
- Assists: 2,154 (2.4 apg)
- Stats at NBA.com
- Stats at Basketball Reference

Jeffrey Nigel Malone (born June 28, 1961) is an American former professional basketball player. He played college basketball for the Mississippi State Bulldogs, and is mostly known for his time with the Washington Bullets (1983–1990) of the National Basketball Association (NBA), where he was an NBA All-Star twice, playing the shooting guard position. He also played for the Utah Jazz, Philadelphia 76ers, and Miami Heat.

== Basketball career ==
Malone averaged 19.0 points per game over 13 years in the NBA. He was known for his capable offense, averaging more than 20 points in six full NBA seasons with Washington and Utah. In particular, Malone was adept at running his defender through a pick or series of screens, receiving a pass and hitting a quick mid-range jump shot. Often, these shots were off-balance, either fading sideways or falling backwards away from hoop, but his accuracy remained lethal, even when well-defended. At times, Malone would go on a hot streak and score more than 15 points in a single quarter.

Malone emerged as one of the best scoring guards in the league over in his few years in the league, appearing in the NBA All-Star Game in both 1986 and 1987. He averaged a career-best 24.3 points per game with the Bullets in 1989–90, his last season with the team.

Malone was traded to the Jazz in the off-season, adding another offensive weapon to a team that already featured future Hall of Famers Karl Malone (no relation) and John Stockton. Jeff Malone averaged 18.6 points per game in his first year in Utah, and shot 91.7 percent on free throws, good for second in the league (narrowly losing the free throw title to Indiana's Reggie Miller, who shot 91.8 percent that season). Malone averaged 20.2 points per game the following year, and was named [[NBA Player of the Week for December 8, 1991. His scoring helped the Jazz to the Western Conference Finals that year, at that time the franchise's best-ever performance in the playoffs. During the 1993–94 season, Malone was sent to the Philadelphia 76ers in a trade that brought Jeff Hornacek to Utah.

Jeff was hired as Smokey Gaines' assistant coach for the IBL Stingrays in July 1999.

Malone also coached the NBA Development League's Columbus Riverdragons from 2001 to 2005, compiling a 102–98 record, before the franchise changed ownership and moved to Austin, Texas, renaming the team the Austin Toros and leaving Malone out of a job. He spent some time as the head coach of the Florida Flame until that team ceased operations in 2006, citing a lack of a suitable arena to play in.

== Personal life ==
Malone resides in Chandler, Arizona, with his wife. He has four children; Jay, Joshua, Justin, and Jasmine Malone and one grandson Marshall Knutson-Malone.

Malone is the nephew of the late Vivian Malone Jones, the first African American graduate of the University of Alabama, and Dr. Sharon Malone Holder, wife of U.S. Attorney General Eric Holder.

He is not related to either former Jazz teammate Karl Malone or Moses Malone (with whom he was a teammate in Washington from 1986 to 1988).

== "Maryland Miracle" shot ==
On January 3, 1984, at home against the Detroit Pistons, Malone, a rookie at the time, hit a three point shot with one second left, falling out of bounds on the left sideline, over the backboard, to put the Bullets up 103-102 with one second left. Prior to this, the Bullets trailed 102-97 with 11 seconds, inbounding the ball. On a quick catch-and-shoot, Washington's Ricky Sobers hit a three-point from the top of the key to cut the Pistons' lead to 102-100 with nine seconds remaining. The Pistons then inbounded the ball to John Long, an 86.2% free throw shooter, who was fouled by the Bullets' Frank Johnson and was sent to the free throw line to shoot two shots with seven seconds left, but almost miraculously, Long would miss both shots.

The second shot was rebounded by Washington rookie Darren Daye, who dribbled thrice before passing it down to the corner to Malone, who slipping backwards, threw up an off-balance 3-point shot which went over the backboard and straight in the net with one second left on the clock. The play-by-play announcer's call was "No good! Rebound Daye! Daye with five seconds into the frontcourt goes to Malone in the corner. Malone throws up a brick left side YEEEESSSSSSSS! OH MY GOODNESS WHAT A SHOT! UH!... UH!... Unbelievable shot by Jeff Malone on the left baseline, he was behind the basket! And that gives the Bullets a one-point lead 103-102!" It is considered to be one of the greatest game-winning shots in NBA history. Following a Pistons timeout with a second left, Bill Laimbeer hit a 25-footer, which appeared to give Detroit the victory but it was waived off as it came after the buzzer, and the Bullets won 103-102.

Malone has confirmed that many children he has coached or visited have tried to replicate his shot but they "never made it".

It has widely been considered one of the greatest game winners in NBA history.

== NBA career statistics ==
Legend
GP	Games played	GS	Games started	MPG	Minutes per game
FG%	Field goal percentage	3P%	3-point field goal percentage	FT%	Free throw percentage
RPG	Rebounds per game	APG	Assists per game	SPG	Steals per game
BPG	Blocks per game	PPG	Points per game	**Bold**	Career high

=== Regular season ===
Year	Team	GP	GS	MPG	FG%	3P%	FT%	RPG	APG	SPG	BPG	PPG
1983–84	Washington	**81**	2	24.4	.444	.323	.826	1.9	1.9	.3	**.2**	12.1
1984–85	Washington	76	61	34.4	.499	.208	.844	2.7	2.4	.7	.1	18.9
1985–86	Washington	80	80	**37.4**	.483	.176	.868	**3.6**	2.4	**.9**	**.2**	22.4
1986–87	Washington	80	79	34.5	.457	.154	.885	2.7	**3.7**	**.9**	**.2**	22.0
1987–88	Washington	80	80	33.2	.476	.417	.882	2.6	3.0	.6	**.2**	20.5
1988–89	Washington	76	75	31.8	.480	.053	.871	2.4	2.9	.5	**.2**	21.7
1989–90	Washington	75	74	34.2	.491	.167	.877	2.7	3.2	.6	.1	**24.3**
1990–91	Utah	69	69	35.7	.508	.167	.917	3.0	2.1	.7	.1	18.6
1991–92	Utah	**81**	**81**	36.1	**.511**	.083	.898	2.9	2.2	.7	.1	20.2
1992–93	Utah	79	59	32.4	.494	.333	.852	2.2	1.6	.5	.1	18.1
1993–94	Utah	50	50	33.1	.488	.500	.843	2.3	1.3	.5	.1	16.2
1993–94	Philadelphia	27	23	33.4	.481	**.667**	.809	3.1	2.2	.5	.0	16.8
1994–95	Philadelphia	19	19	34.7	.507	.393	.864	2.9	1.5	.8	.0	18.4
1995–96	Philadelphia	25	3	16.3	.394	.313	**.923**	1.3	.8	.5	.0	6.2
1995–96	Miami	7	0	14.7	.394	—	.833	1.1	1.0	.4	.0	4.4
Career		905	755	32.8	.484	.268	.871	2.6	2.4	.6	.1	19.0
All-Star		2	0	12.5	.600	.000	—	1.5	3.0	.5	.0	6.0

=== Playoffs ===
Year	Team	GP	GS	MPG	FG%	3P%	FT%	RPG	APG	SPG	BPG	PPG
1984	Washington	4	—	17.8	.462	.000	—	1.3	.5	.3	.0	6.0
1985	Washington	4	4	31.5	.482	**.333**	.769	1.5	2.0	1.3	.0	16.3
1986	Washington	5	5	39.4	.408	.000	.897	3.2	**3.4**	**1.4**	.6	22.0
1987	Washington	3	3	35.0	.370	—	**1.000**	2.3	3.0	.3	.0	15.0
1988	Washington	5	5	**39.8**	**.515**	.000	.757	3.4	2.2	1.0	**1.0**	**25.6**
1991	Utah	9	9	39.0	.493	.000	.917	**3.9**	3.2	1.0	.1	20.7
1992	Utah	**16**	**16**	38.1	.487	**.333**	.861	2.4	1.9	.5	.1	20.7
1993	Utah	5	5	30.0	.446	—	.692	3.2	.6	.6	.2	13.4
Career		51	47	35.5	.470	.167	.852	2.8	2.2	.8	.2	18.7

== D-league Head Coach ==
Season	Finish	Wins	Losses	Pct.	Postseason results
Columbus Riverdragons
2001–02	3rd	31	25	.554	Lost Semifinals (Greenville) 1–2
2002–03	6th	23	27	.460	
2003–04	6th	18	28	.391	
2004–05	1st	30	18	.625	Won Semifinals (Roanoke) 96–89; Lost NBDL Finals (Asheville) 67–90
Florida Flame
2005–06	3rd	25	23	.521	Lost Semifinals (Albuquerque) 80–71

== See also ==
- List of National Basketball Association career free throw percentage leaders
