= 1991–92 Chicago Bulls season =

Bulls' 26th season in the National Basketball Association

- NBA champions
- Conference champions
- Division champions
- Head coach: Phil Jackson
- General manager: Jerry Krause
- Owners: Jerry Reinsdorf
- Arena: Chicago Stadium

Results
- Record: 67–15 (.817)
- Place: Division: 1st (Central); Conference: 1st (Eastern)
- Playoff finish: NBA champions (Defeated Trail Blazers 4–2)
- Stats at Basketball Reference

Local media
- Television: WGN-TV (Wayne Larrivee, Johnny "Red" Kerr); SportsChannel Chicago (Tom Dore, Johnny "Red" Kerr)
- Radio: WMAQ (Neil Funk, Tom Boerwinkle); WTAQ (John Morales, Christian Ramos)

The 1991–92 Chicago Bulls season was the 26th season for the Chicago Bulls in the National Basketball Association. The Bulls entered the regular season as the defending NBA champions, having defeated the Los Angeles Lakers in five games in the 1991 NBA Finals, and winning their first ever NBA championship in franchise history.

== Season summary ==
=== Regular season ===
Early into the regular season, the Bulls traded Dennis Hopson to the Sacramento Kings in exchange for Bob Hansen after the first two games. Coming off their first ever championship, the Bulls got off to a 1–2 start to the regular season, but then posted a 14-game winning streak between November and December afterwards. The team later on posted a 13-game winning streak in January, which led them to a 37–5 start to the season, and held a 39–9 record at the All-Star break. The Bulls posted an eight-game winning streak in March, and finished in first place in the Central Division with a league-best 67–15 record, earning the first seed in the Eastern Conference, and qualifying for the NBA playoffs for the eighth consecutive year.

Michael Jordan captured his sixth straight scoring title, averaging 30.1 points, 6.4 rebounds, 6.1 assists and 2.3 steals per game, and was named to the All-NBA First Team, and was also named the NBA Most Valuable Player of the Year for the second consecutive year, and for the third time. In addition, Scottie Pippen averaged 21.0 points, 7.7 rebounds, 7.0 assists and 1.9 steals per game, and was named to the All-NBA Second Team, while Horace Grant provided the team with 14.2 points, 10.0 rebounds and 1.6 blocks per game, and B.J. Armstrong contributed 9.9 points and 3.2 assists per game off the bench. Meanwhile, Bill Cartwright provided with 8.0 points and 5.1 rebounds per game, John Paxson and Stacey King both contributed 7.0 points per game each, and Will Perdue averaged 4.5 points and 4.1 rebounds per game. Jordan and Pippen were also both named to the NBA All-Defensive First Team.

During the NBA All-Star weekend at the Orlando Arena in Orlando, Florida, Jordan and Pippen were both selected for the 1992 NBA All-Star Game, as members of the Eastern Conference All-Star team, while head coach Phil Jackson was selected to coach the Eastern Conference. Meanwhile, three-point specialist Craig Hodges won the NBA Three-Point Shootout for the third consecutive year. Pippen also finished in ninth place in Most Valuable Player voting, and Jordan and Pippen both finished tied in third place in Defensive Player of the Year voting, while Jackson finished in third place in Coach of the Year voting.

The Bulls finished fifth in the NBA in home-game attendance, with an attendance of 759,980 at the Chicago Stadium during the regular season.

=== NBA playoffs ===
In the Eastern Conference First Round of the 1992 NBA playoffs, the Bulls faced off against the 8th–seeded Miami Heat, a team that featured Glen Rice, Rony Seikaly and Grant Long. The Bulls won the first two games over the Heat at home at the Chicago Stadium, before winning Game 3 on the road, 119–114 at the Miami Arena, in which Jordan scored 56 points as the Bulls won the series in a three-game sweep.

In the Eastern Conference Semi-finals, and for the second consecutive year, the team faced off against the 4th–seeded New York Knicks, who were led by All-Star center Patrick Ewing, Xavier McDaniel, and sixth man John Starks, and were also coached by Pat Riley. The Bulls lost Game 1 to the Knicks at the Chicago Stadium, 94–89, but managed to win the next two games, then take a 3–2 series lead, before losing Game 6 to the Knicks on the road, 100–86 at Madison Square Garden. With the series tied at 3–3, the Bulls won Game 7 over the Knicks at the Chicago Stadium, 110–81 to win in a hard-fought seven-game series.

In the Eastern Conference Finals, the Bulls then faced off against the 3rd–seeded Cleveland Cavaliers, who were led by the trio of All-Star center Brad Daugherty, All-Star guard Mark Price, and Larry Nance. After winning Game 1 at the Chicago Stadium, 103–89, the Bulls suffered a 26-point home loss to the Cavaliers in Game 2, 107–81. With the series tied at 2–2, the Bulls won the next two games, including a Game 6 road win over the Cavaliers, 99–94 at the Coliseum at Richfield to win the series in six games, and advance to the NBA Finals for the second consecutive year.

In the 1992 NBA Finals, the Bulls faced off against the top–seeded Portland Trail Blazers, a team that featured All-Star guard Clyde Drexler, All-Star guard Terry Porter, and Jerome Kersey. The Bulls won Game 1 over the Trail Blazers at home, 122–89 at the Chicago Stadium, but then lost Game 2 at home in overtime, 115–104. With the series tied at 2–2, the Bulls won Game 5 over the Trail Blazers on the road, 119–106 at the Memorial Coliseum, and then won Game 6 at the Chicago Stadium, 97–93 to win the series in six games, winning their second consecutive NBA championship, as Jordan was named the NBA Finals Most Valuable Player for the second straight year.

=== Aftermath ===
Following the season, Hodges and Hansen were both released to free agency.

== Draft picks ==
Round	Pick	Player	Position	Nationality	School/Club team
1	26	Mark Randall	PF	United States	Kansas

== Roster ==
1991–92 Chicago Bulls roster
Players

Pos.	No.	Player	Height	Weight	DOB	From
PG	10	BJ Armstrong	6 ft 2 in (1.88 m)	175 lb (79 kg)	1967–09–09	Iowa
C	24	Bill Cartwright	7 ft 1 in (2.16 m)	245 lb (111 kg)	1957–07–30	San Francisco
PF	54	Horace Grant	6 ft 10 in (2.08 m)	245 lb (111 kg)	1965–07–04	Clemson
SG	20	Bobby Hansen	6 ft 6 in (1.98 m)	190 lb (86 kg)	1961–01–18	Iowa
PG	14	Craig Hodges	6 ft 2 in (1.88 m)	190 lb (86 kg)	1960–06–27	Long Beach State
SG	23	Michael Jordan	6 ft 6 in (1.98 m)	215 lb (98 kg)	1963–02–17	North Carolina
PF	21	Stacey King	6 ft 11 in (2.11 m)	230 lb (104 kg)	1967–01–29	Oklahoma
PF	53	Cliff Levingston	6 ft 8 in (2.03 m)	230 lb (104 kg)	1961–01–04	Wichita State
PG	5	John Paxson	6 ft 2 in (1.88 m)	185 lb (84 kg)	1960–09–29	Notre Dame
C	32	Will Perdue	7 ft 0 in (2.13 m)	240 lb (109 kg)	1965–08–29	Vanderbilt
SF	33	Scottie Pippen	6 ft 7 in (2.01 m)	220 lb (100 kg)	1965–09–25	Central Arkansas
PF	42	Scott Williams	6 ft 10 in (2.08 m)	230 lb (104 kg)	1968–03–21	North Carolina

Coaches
Head coach
- Phil Jackson
Assistant(s)
- Johnny Bach
- Jim Cleamons
- Tex Winter

Legend
- (DP) Unsigned draft pick
- (FA) Free agent
- (S) Suspended
- Injured

Roster
Updated: January 2, 1992

== Regular season ==
=== Season standings ===
Central Division	W	L	PCT	GB	Home	Road	Div
y-Chicago Bulls	67	15	.817	—	36–5	31–10	22–6
x-Cleveland Cavaliers	57	25	.695	10	35–6	22–19	21–7
x-Detroit Pistons	48	34	.585	19	25–16	23–18	15–13
x-Indiana Pacers	40	42	.488	27	26–15	14–27	13–15
Atlanta Hawks	38	44	.463	29	23–18	15–26	7–21
Milwaukee Bucks	31	51	.378	36	25–16	6–35	10–18
Charlotte Hornets	31	51	.378	36	22–19	9–32	10–18

y – clinched division title
x – clinched playoff spot

#	Eastern Conference				
#	Team	W	L	PCT	GB
1	z-Chicago Bulls	67	15	.817	–
2	y-Boston Celtics	51	31	.622	16
3	x-Cleveland Cavaliers	57	25	.695	10
4	x-New York Knicks	51	31	.622	16
5	x-Detroit Pistons	48	34	.585	19
6	x-New Jersey Nets	40	42	.488	27
7	x-Indiana Pacers	40	42	.488	27
8	x-Miami Heat	38	44	.463	29
9	Atlanta Hawks	38	44	.463	29
10	Philadelphia 76ers	35	47	.427	32
11	Milwaukee Bucks	31	51	.378	36
12	Charlotte Hornets	31	51	.378	36
13	Washington Bullets	25	57	.305	42
14	Orlando Magic	21	61	.256	46

z – clinched conference
y – clinched division title
x – clinched playoff spot

== Game log ==
=== Regular season ===
1991–92 game log
Total: 67–15 (Home: 36–5; Road: 31–10)
November: 13–2 (home: 5–1; road: 8–1)

Game	Date	Team	Score	High points	High rebounds	High assists	Location Attendance	Record
1	November 1, 1991	Philadelphia	W 110–90	Michael Jordan (26)	Scottie Pippen (8)	John Paxson (9)	Chicago Stadium; 18,676	1–0
2	November 2, 1991	@ Milwaukee	L 107–109	Michael Jordan (46)	Horace Grant (11)	Paxson & Pippen (5)	Bradley Center; 18,633	1–1
3	November 5, 1991	Golden State	L 110–118	Michael Jordan (40)	Scottie Pippen (11)	Scottie Pippen (7)	Chicago Stadium; 18,136	1–2
4	November 6, 1991	@ Boston	W 132–113	Michael Jordan (44)	Bill Cartwright (10)	B. J. Armstrong (9)	Boston Garden; 14,890	2–2
5	November 8, 1991	Dallas	W 108–92	Michael Jordan (26)	Grant & Pippen (10)	Scottie Pippen (8)	Chicago Stadium; 18,120	3–2
6	November 9, 1991	Orlando	W 107–76	Michael Jordan (27)	Horace Grant (10)	Michael Jordan (9)	Chicago Stadium; 18,131	4–2
7	November 12, 1991	Detroit	W 110–93	Michael Jordan (20)	Horace Grant (12)	Scottie Pippen (9)	Chicago Stadium; 18,676	5–2
8	November 13, 1991	@ Charlotte	W 117–95	Michael Jordan (35)	Horace Grant (10)	Scottie Pippen (9)	Charlotte Coliseum; 23,698	6–2
9	November 15, 1991	Milwaukee	W 114–101	Scottie Pippen (23)	Grant & Levingston (8)	Michael Jordan (11)	Chicago Stadium; 18,686	7–2
10	November 20, 1991	@ Golden State	W 112–108	Michael Jordan (35)	Horace Grant (14)	Michael Jordan (7)	Oakland–Alameda County Coliseum Arena; 15,025	8–2
11	November 22, 1991	@ Seattle	W 112–109 (OT)	Michael Jordan (31)	Stacey King (7)	Scottie Pippen (5)	Kingdome; 38,067	9–2
12	November 23, 1991	@ Denver	W 107–100	Michael Jordan (37)	Stacey King (9)	Scottie Pippen (5)	McNichols Sports Arena; 17,022	10–2
13	November 26, 1991	@ L.A. Clippers	W 116–79	Michael Jordan (23)	Michael Jordan (10)	Scottie Pippen (8)	Los Angeles Memorial Sports Arena; 15,800	11–2
14	November 29, 1991	@ Portland	W 116–114 (2OT)	Michael Jordan (40)	Grant & Pippen (11)	Scottie Pippen (8)	Memorial Coliseum; 12,888	12–2
15	November 30, 1991	@ Sacramento	W 118–102	Michael Jordan (30)	Horace Grant (10)	Michael Jordan (8)	ARCO Arena; 17,014	13–2

December: 11–2 (home: 7–1; road: 4–1)

Game	Date	Team	Score	High points	High rebounds	High assists	Location Attendance	Record
16	December 4, 1991	Cleveland	W 108–102	Scottie Pippen (28)	Scottie Pippen (15)	Scottie Pippen (10)	Chicago Stadium; 18,489	14–2
17	December 6, 1991	Charlotte	W 114–96	Michael Jordan (19)	Michael Jordan (11)	Michael Jordan (10)	Chicago Stadium; 18,237	15–2
18	December 7, 1991	@ Philadelphia	L 100–103	Michael Jordan (32)	Michael Jordan (14)	Michael Jordan (9)	The Spectrum; 18,168	15–3
19	December 10, 1991	Seattle	W 108–103	Scottie Pippen (23)	Horace Grant (13)	Scottie Pippen (8)	Chicago Stadium; 18,061	16–3
20	December 13, 1991	New York	W 99–89	Michael Jordan (27)	Grant & Jordan (8)	Jordan & Paxson (6)	Chicago Stadium; 18,676	17–3
21	December 14, 1991	@ Washington	W 113–100	Michael Jordan (29)	Horace Grant (13)	3 players tied (3)	Capital Centre; 18,756	18–3
22	December 17, 1991	L.A. Lakers	L 89–102	Michael Jordan (21)	Horace Grant (10)	Scottie Pippen (8)	Chicago Stadium; 18,676	18–4
23	December 20, 1991	@ New Jersey	W 115–98	Horace Grant (28)	Horace Grant (8)	B. J. Armstrong (6)	Brendan Byrne Arena; 20,049	19–4
24	December 21, 1991	Atlanta	W 117–103	Jordan & Pippen (37)	Michael Jordan (9)	Michael Jordan (10)	Chicago Stadium; 18,676	20–4
25	December 25, 1991	Boston	W 121–99	Scottie Pippen (27)	Horace Grant (12)	Scottie Pippen (8)	Chicago Stadium; 18,676	21–4
26	December 26, 1991	@ Atlanta	W 122–111	Michael Jordan (34)	Horace Grant (18)	Armstrong & Pippen (7)	Omni Coliseum; 16,425	22–4
27	December 28, 1991	Sacramento	W 127–118	Michael Jordan (33)	Scottie Pippen (12)	Scottie Pippen (9)	Chicago Stadium; 18,676	23–4
28	December 30, 1991	@ Indiana	W 109–104	Michael Jordan (29)	Horace Grant (10)	Jordan & Paxson (7)	Market Square Arena; 16,530	24–4

January: 14–3 (home: 9–0; road: 5–3)

Game	Date	Team	Score	High points	High rebounds	High assists	Location Attendance	Record
29	January 3, 1992	@ Milwaukee	L 108–113	Michael Jordan (44)	Horace Grant (8)	Scottie Pippen (8)	Bradley Center; 18,633	24–5
30	January 4, 1992	New Jersey	W 140–96	Michael Jordan (27)	Horace Grant (17)	Scottie Pippen (9)	Chicago Stadium; 18,676	25–5
31	January 7, 1992	Washington	W 102–89	Michael Jordan (21)	Horace Grant (10)	Michael Jordan (9)	Chicago Stadium; 18,236	26–5
32	January 8, 1992	@ Miami	W 108–106	Michael Jordan (40)	Horace Grant (10)	Jordan & Pippen (8)	Miami Arena; 15,008	27–5
33	January 10, 1992	Utah	W 105–90	Michael Jordan (37)	Horace Grant (8)	Scottie Pippen (6)	Chicago Stadium; 18,676	28–5
34	January 11, 1992	Miami	W 108–99	Michael Jordan (30)	Horace Grant (18)	Scottie Pippen (8)	Chicago Stadium; 18,676	29–5
35	January 14, 1992	Philadelphia	W 103–80	Michael Jordan (26)	Horace Grant (12)	Scottie Pippen (7)	Chicago Stadium; 18,338	30–5
36	January 16, 1992	@ Cleveland	W 100–85	Michael Jordan (35)	Horace Grant (12)	Michael Jordan (8)	Richfield Coliseum; 20,273	31–5
37	January 17, 1992	San Antonio	W 102–96	Michael Jordan (31)	Will Perdue (14)	Michael Jordan (8)	Chicago Stadium; 18,676	32–5
38	January 19, 1992	@ Detroit	W 87–85	Michael Jordan (34)	Horace Grant (12)	3 players tied (6)	The Palace of Auburn Hills; 21,454	33–5
39	January 21, 1992	Phoenix Suns	W 108–102	Michael Jordan (30)	Horace Grant (11)	Scottie Pippen (6)	Chicago Stadium; 18,676	34–5
40	January 22, 1992	@ Charlotte	W 115–112	Michael Jordan (23)	Bill Cartwright (10)	Scottie Pippen (8)	Charlotte Coliseum; 23,698	35–5
41	January 24, 1992	Detroit	W 117–93	Scottie Pippen (29)	Stacey King (7)	Armstrong & Pippen (8)	Chicago Stadium; 18,676	36–5
42	January 25, 1992	Houston	W 114–100	Michael Jordan (35)	Grant & Pippen (9)	Scottie Pippen (11)	Chicago Stadium; 18,676	37–5
43	January 28, 1992	@ San Antonio	L 104–109	Michael Jordan (39)	Scottie Pippen (10)	Michael Jordan (7)	HemisFair Arena; 16,057	37–6
44	January 30, 1992	@ Houston	L 102–105	Michael Jordan (22)	Horace Grant (12)	Horace Grant (6)	The Summit; 16,611	37–7
45	January 31, 1992	@ Dallas	W 107–92	Michael Jordan (25)	Michael Jordan (10)	Michael Jordan (9)	Reunion Arena; 17,502	38–7

February: 9–4 (home: 4–1; road: 5–3)

Game	Date	Team	Score	High points	High rebounds	High assists	Location Attendance	Record
46	February 2, 1992	@ L.A. Lakers	W 103–97	Michael Jordan (33)	Horace Grant (11)	Michael Jordan (11)	Great Western Forum; 17,505	39–7
47	February 3, 1992	@ Utah	L 123–126 (3OT)	Michael Jordan (34)	3 players tied (13)	Michael Jordan (8)	Delta Center; 19,911	39–8
48	February 5, 1992	@ Phoenix	L 114–126	Scottie Pippen (26)	Horace Grant (16)	Scottie Pippen (12)	Arizona Veterans Memorial Coliseum; 14,496	39–9
All-Star Break
49	February 11, 1992	New Jersey	W 133–113	Michael Jordan (34)	Grant & Pippen (8)	Scottie Pippen (8)	Chicago Stadium; 18,233	40–9
50	February 13, 1992	@ New York	W 106–85	Horace Grant (18)	Horace Grant (11)	Scottie Pippen (13)	Madison Square Garden; 19,763	41–9
51	February 15, 1992	New York	W 99–98	Michael Jordan (29)	Horace Grant (11)	Scottie Pippen (8)	Chicago Stadium; 18,676	42–9
52	February 17, 1992	Cleveland	L 112–113	Michael Jordan (46)	Horace Grant (11)	Scottie Pippen (7)	Chicago Stadium; 18,676	42–10
53	February 19, 1992	@ Orlando	W 112–99	Michael Jordan (46)	Horace Grant (11)	Scottie Pippen (7)	Orlando Arena; 15,151	43–10
54	February 21, 1992	@ Atlanta	W 103–88	Michael Jordan (33)	Will Perdue (13)	Michael Jordan (14)	Omni Coliseum; 16,531	44–10
55	February 22, 1992	Minnesota	W 105–90	Michael Jordan (30)	Horace Grant (17)	Michael Jordan (8)	Chicago Stadium; 18,676	45–10
56	February 25, 1992	@ Detroit	L 106–108	Scottie Pippen (33)	Horace Grant (13)	Scottie Pippen (9)	The Palace of Auburn Hills; 21,454	45–11
57	February 26, 1992	Washington	W 122–103	Michael Jordan (26)	Pippen & Williams (9)	B. J. Armstrong (7)	Chicago Stadium; 18,104	46–11
58	February 28, 1992	@ Milwaukee	W 109–105	Scottie Pippen (41)	Bill Cartwright (8)	Michael Jordan (6)	Bradley Center; 18,633	47–11

March: 12–2 (home: 5–2; road: 7–0)

Game	Date	Team	Score	High points	High rebounds	High assists	Location Attendance	Record
59	March 1, 1992	Portland	W 111–91	Michael Jordan (31)	Will Perdue (12)	Scottie Pippen (10)	Chicago Stadium; 18,676	48–11
60	March 3, 1992	Indiana	L 101–103	Michael Jordan (27)	Horace Grant (9)	Scottie Pippen (9)	Chicago Stadium; 18,402	48–12
61	March 5, 1992	@ Minnesota	W 113–100	Michael Jordan (33)	Will Perdue (11)	Scottie Pippen (8)	Target Center; 19,006	49–12
62	March 6, 1992	Miami	W 123–81	Michael Jordan (27)	Horace Grant (14)	Armstrong & Pippen (6)	Chicago Stadium; 18,487	50–12
63	March 8, 1992	@ Philadelphia	W 103–99	Michael Jordan (34)	Michael Jordan (11)	Michael Jordan (8)	The Spectrum; 18,168	51–12
64	March 11, 1992	Boston	W 119–85	Michael Jordan (32)	Michael Jordan (13)	Scottie Pippen (11)	Chicago Stadium; 18,676	52–12
65	March 14, 1992	@ Orlando	W 112–96	Michael Jordan (26)	Horace Grant (12)	Michael Jordan (9)	Orlando Arena; 15,151	53–12
66	March 16, 1992	@ Miami	W 116–100	Michael Jordan (37)	Scottie Pippen (13)	Michael Jordan (13)	Miami Arena; 15,008	54–12
67	March 17, 1992	@ New Jersey	W 90–79	Michael Jordan (40)	Horace Grant (12)	Jordan & Pippen (4)	Brendan Byrne Arena; 20,049	55–12
68	March 19, 1992	@ Washington	W 106–100	Michael Jordan (51)	Michael Jordan (11)	Horace Grant (4)	Capital Centre; 18,756	56–12
69	March 21, 1992	Orlando	L 108–111	Scottie Pippen (27)	Michael Jordan (15)	John Paxson (6)	Chicago Stadium; 18,676	56–13
70	March 24, 1992	Denver	W 116–103	Michael Jordan (50)	Horace Grant (20)	Scottie Pippen (13)	Chicago Stadium; 18,382	57–13
71	March 28, 1992	Denver	W 126–102	Michael Jordan (44)	Horace Grant (18)	B. J. Armstrong (7)	Chicago Stadium; 18,676	58–13
72	March 31, 1992	@ New York	W 96–90	Michael Jordan (36)	Scottie Pippen (18)	Scottie Pippen (7)	Madison Square Garden; 19,763	59–13

April: 8–2 (home: 6–0; road: 2–2)

Game	Date	Team	Score	High points	High rebounds	High assists	Location Attendance	Record
73	April 1, 1992	Charlotte	W 100–94	Michael Jordan (31)	Horace Grant (14)	Scottie Pippen (12)	Chicago Stadium; 18,362	60–13
74	April 3, 1992	L.A. Clippers	W 114–103	Scottie Pippen (24)	Scottie Pippen (11)	Jordan & Pippen (7)	Chicago Stadium; 18,676	61–13
75	April 5, 1992	@ Boston	L 86–97	Michael Jordan (26)	Horace Grant (11)	Grant & Pippen (4)	Boston Garden; 14,890	61–14
76	April 7, 1992	Milwaukee	W 116–101	Michael Jordan (30)	3 players tied (8)	Michael Jordan (7)	Chicago Stadium; 18,676	62–14
77	April 10, 1992	@ Indiana	W 108–96	Michael Jordan (35)	Horace Grant (11)	Michael Jordan (6)	Market Square Arena; 16,530	63–14
78	April 11, 1992	Indiana	W 108–106	Michael Jordan (23)	Horace Grant (7)	Michael Jordan (8)	Chicago Stadium; 18,676	64–14
79	April 13, 1992	Atlanta	W 100–93	Scottie Pippen (16)	Scott Williams (11)	Scottie Pippen (8)	Chicago Stadium; 18,676	65–14
80	April 14, 1992	@ Cleveland	L 100–115	Scottie Pippen (24)	Scottie Pippen (10)	B. J. Armstrong (10)	Richfield Coliseum; 20,273	65–15
81	April 17, 1992	@ Atlanta	W 121–95	Michael Jordan (21)	Scott Williams (7)	Michael Jordan (8)	Omni Coliseum; 16,531	66–15
82	April 19, 1992	Detroit	W 103–85	Michael Jordan (32)	Scott Williams (16)	Michael Jordan (7)	Chicago Stadium; 18,676	67–15

1991–92 schedule

=== Playoffs ===
1992 playoff game log
Total: 15–7 (Home: 9–3; Road: 6–4)
First Round: 3–0 (home: 2–0; road: 1–0)

Game	Date	Team	Score	High points	High rebounds	High assists	Location Attendance	Series
1	April 24, 1992	Miami	W 113–94	Michael Jordan (46)	Michael Jordan (11)	Scottie Pippen (11)	Chicago Stadium; 18,676	1–0
2	April 26, 1992	Miami	W 120–90	Michael Jordan (33)	Michael Jordan (13)	Michael Jordan (6)	Chicago Stadium; 18,676	2–0
3	April 29, 1992	@ Miami	W 119–114	Michael Jordan (56)	Grant & Pippen (8)	Jordan & Pippen (5)	Miami Arena; 15,008	3–0

Conference Semifinals: 4–3 (home: 3–1; road: 1–2)

Game	Date	Team	Score	High points	High rebounds	High assists	Location Attendance	Series
1	May 5, 1992	New York	L 89–94	Michael Jordan (31)	Cartwright & Pippen (8)	Scottie Pippen (9)	Chicago Stadium; 18,676	0–1
2	May 7, 1992	New York	W 86–78	Michael Jordan (27)	Horace Grant (11)	John Paxson (7)	Chicago Stadium; 18,676	1–1
3	May 9, 1992	@ New York	W 94–86	Michael Jordan (32)	Horace Grant (13)	John Paxson (4)	Madison Square Garden; 19,763	2–1
4	May 10, 1992	@ New York	L 86–93	Michael Jordan (29)	Scottie Pippen (8)	Scottie Pippen (7)	Madison Square Garden; 19,763	2–2
5	May 12, 1992	New York	W 96–88	Michael Jordan (37)	Scottie Pippen (10)	Scottie Pippen (8)	Chicago Stadium; 18,676	3–2
6	May 14, 1992	@ New York	L 86–100	Michael Jordan (21)	Scottie Pippen (10)	Michael Jordan (8)	Madison Square Garden; 19,763	3–3
7	May 17, 1992	New York	W 110–81	Michael Jordan (42)	Scottie Pippen (11)	Scottie Pippen (11)	Chicago Stadium; 18,676	4–3

Conference Finals: 4–2 (home: 2–1; road: 2–1)

Game	Date	Team	Score	High points	High rebounds	High assists	Location Attendance	Series
1	May 19, 1992	Cleveland	W 103–89	Michael Jordan (33)	Scottie Pippen (12)	Scottie Pippen (9)	Chicago Stadium; 18,676	1–0
2	May 21, 1992	Cleveland	L 81–107	Michael Jordan (20)	Horace Grant (12)	4 players tied (3)	Chicago Stadium; 18,676	1–1
3	May 23, 1992	@ Cleveland	W 105–96	Michael Jordan (36)	Horace Grant (11)	Michael Jordan (9)	Richfield Coliseum; 20,273	2–1
4	May 25, 1992	@ Cleveland	L 85–99	Michael Jordan (35)	Horace Grant (15)	Michael Jordan (6)	Richfield Coliseum; 20,273	2–2
5	May 27, 1992	Cleveland	W 112–89	Michael Jordan (37)	Scottie Pippen (15)	Scottie Pippen (6)	Chicago Stadium; 18,676	3–2
6	May 29, 1992	@ Cleveland	W 99–94	Jordan & Pippen (29)	Scottie Pippen (12)	Michael Jordan (8)	Richfield Coliseum; 20,273	4–2

NBA Finals: 4–2 (home: 2–1; road: 2–1)

Game	Date	Team	Score	High points	High rebounds	High assists	Location Attendance	Series
1	June 3, 1992	Portland	W 122–89	Michael Jordan (39)	Pippen & Williams (9)	Michael Jordan (11)	Chicago Stadium; 18,676	1–0
2	June 5, 1992	Portland	L 104–115 (OT)	Michael Jordan (39)	Horace Grant (12)	Jordan & Pippen (10)	Chicago Stadium; 18,676	1–1
3	June 7, 1992	@ Portland	W 94–84	Michael Jordan (26)	Grant & Pippen (8)	Scottie Pippen (7)	Memorial Coliseum; 12,888	2–1
4	June 10, 1992	@ Portland	L 88–93	Michael Jordan (32)	Horace Grant (10)	Jordan & Pippen (6)	Memorial Coliseum; 12,888	2–2
5	June 12, 1992	@ Portland	W 119–106	Michael Jordan (46)	Scottie Pippen (11)	Scottie Pippen (9)	Memorial Coliseum; 12,888	3–2
6	June 14, 1992	Portland	W 97–93	Michael Jordan (33)	Scott Williams (8)	Horace Grant (5)	Chicago Stadium; 18,678	4–2

1992 schedule

== Player stats ==
Legend
GP	Games played	GS	Games started	MPG	Minutes per game
FG%	Field-goal percentage	3P%	3-point field-goal percentage	FT%	Free-throw percentage
RPG	Rebounds per game	APG	Assists per game	SPG	Steals per game
BPG	Blocks per game	PPG	Points per game

=== Regular season ===
Player	GP	GS	MPG	FG%	3P%	FT%	RPG	APG	SPG	BPG	PPG
B. J. Armstrong	82	3	22.9	.481	.402	.806	1.8	3.2	.56	.06	9.9
Bill Cartwright	64	64	23.0	.467	.000	.604	5.1	1.4	.34	.22	8.0
Horace Grant	81	81	35.3	.578	.000	.741	10.0	2.7	1.23	1.62	14.2
Bob Hansen	66	0	11.7	.444	.280	.364	1.1	1.0	.39	.05	2.5
Craig Hodges	56	2	9.9	.384	.375	.941	.4	1.0	.25	.02	4.2
Dennis Hopson	2	0	5.0	.500	.000	.000	.0	.0	.50	.00	1.0
Michael Jordan	80	80	38.8	.519	.270	.832	6.4	6.1	2.28	.94	30.1
Stacey King	79	12	16.1	.506	.400	.753	2.6	1.0	.27	.32	7.0
Cliff Levingston	79	0	12.9	.498	.167	.625	2.9	.8	.34	.57	3.9
Chuck Nevitt	4	0	2.2	.333	.000	.000	.2	.2	.00	.00	.5
John Paxson	79	79	24.6	.528	.273	.784	1.2	3.1	.62	.11	7.0
Will Perdue	77	7	13.1	.547	.500	.495	4.1	1.0	.21	.56	4.5
Scottie Pippen	82	82	38.6	.506	.200	.760	7.7	7.0	1.89	1.13	21.0
Mark Randall	15	0	4.5	.455	.000	.750	.6	.5	.00	.00	1.7
Rory Sparrow	4	0	4.5	.125	.500	.000	.2	1.0	.00	.00	.8
Scott Williams	63	0	11.0	.483	.000	.649	3.9	.8	.21	.57	3.4

=== Playoffs ===
Player	GP	GS	MPG	FG%	3P%	FT%	RPG	APG	SPG	BPG	PPG
B. J. Armstrong	22		19.7	.453	.294	.789	1.1	2.1	.64	.00	7.3
Bill Cartwright	22	22	27.8	.474	.000	.419	4.5	1.7	.50	.18	5.6
Horace Grant	22	22	38.9	.541	.000	.671	8.8	3.0	1.09	1.77	11.3
Bob Hansen	9		7.7	.409	.500	.333	1.0	1.1	.11	.00	2.4
Craig Hodges	17		8.1	.390	.450	.500	.2	.3	.29	.00	2.5
Michael Jordan	22	22	41.8	.499	.386	.857	6.2	5.8	2.00	.73	34.5
Stacey King	14		7.9	.450	1.000	.652	1.4	.4	.36	.14	3.8
Cliff Levingston	22		8.7	.439	.000	.500	1.9	.4	.18	.27	2.9
John Paxson	22	22	27.2	.525	.444	.842	1.0	2.8	.64	.05	7.9
Will Perdue	18		8.7	.486	.000	.450	2.2	.5	.17	.56	2.5
Scottie Pippen	22	22	40.9	.468	.250	.761	8.8	6.7	1.86	1.14	19.5
Scott Williams	22		14.6	.486	.000	.714	4.3	.3	.27	.82	4.0

Player statistics citation:

=== Impact of the Stanley Cup Final ===
The Chicago Blackhawks were in the Stanley Cup Final at the same time the Bulls won the NBA championship, but got swept by the defending champions, Pittsburgh Penguins, (It would not be until 2010 when the Blackhawks won their first Stanley Cup since 1961, when they beat the Philadelphia Flyers, in-state rivals of the Penguins, winning in Philadelphia). This was the only year that both the Bulls and the Blackhawks reached their respective league's finals. However, the coach of the Blackhawks, Mike Keenan, would see a concurrent finals series in basketball and hockey taking place in the same city again when he coached the New York Rangers to their first Stanley Cup in 54 years two years later.

== Awards and records ==
- Michael Jordan, Associated Press Athlete of the Year
- Michael Jordan, NBA Most Valuable Player Award
- Michael Jordan, All-NBA First Team
- Scottie Pippen, All-NBA Second Team
- Michael Jordan, NBA Finals Most Valuable Player Award
- Michael Jordan, NBA All-Defensive First Team
- Scottie Pippen, NBA All-Defensive First Team

=== NBA All-Star Game ===
- Michael Jordan, Guard
- Scottie Pippen, Forward
