= 1991–92 NBA season =

46th NBA season

- League: National Basketball Association
- Sport: Basketball
- Duration: November 1, 1991 – April 19, 1992; April 23 – May 29, 1992 (Playoffs); June 3 – 14, 1992 (Finals)
- Teams: 27
- TV partner(s): NBC, TBS, TNT

Draft
- Top draft pick: Larry Johnson
- Picked by: Charlotte Hornets

Regular season
- Top seed: Chicago Bulls
- Season MVP: Michael Jordan (Chicago)
- Top scorer: Michael Jordan (Chicago)

Playoffs
- Eastern champions: Chicago Bulls
- Eastern runners-up: Cleveland Cavaliers
- Western champions: Portland Trail Blazers
- Western runners-up: Utah Jazz

Finals
- Champions: Chicago Bulls
- Runners-up: Portland Trail Blazers
- Finals MVP: Michael Jordan (Chicago)

NBA seasons
- ← 1990–91 1992–93 →

The 1991–92 NBA season was the 46th season of the National Basketball Association (NBA). The season ended with the Chicago Bulls winning their second straight NBA championship, beating the Portland Trail Blazers 4 games to 2 in the NBA Finals. This was Larry Bird's final season as a player in the NBA.

== Notable occurrences ==
Coaching changes
Offseason
| Team | 1990–91 coach | 1991–92 coach |
|---|---|---|
| Charlotte Hornets | Gene Littles | Allan Bristow |
| Miami Heat | Ron Rothstein | Kevin Loughery |
| Minnesota Timberwolves | Bill Musselman | Jimmy Rodgers |
| New York Knicks | John MacLeod | Pat Riley |
In-season
| Team | Outgoing coach | Incoming coach |
| Houston Rockets | Don Chaney | Rudy Tomjanovich |
| Los Angeles Clippers | Mike Schuler | Mack Calvin |
| Los Angeles Clippers | Mack Calvin | Larry Brown |
| Milwaukee Bucks | Del Harris | Frank Hamblen |
| Sacramento Kings | Dick Motta | Rex Hughes |
| San Antonio Spurs | Larry Brown | Bob Bass |
| Seattle SuperSonics | K.C. Jones | Bob Kloppenburg |
| Seattle SuperSonics | Bob Kloppenburg | George Karl |

- The game clock and shot clock combo was introduced as of today.
- Magic Johnson of the Los Angeles Lakers announces his retirement early in the season after receiving the news that he had tested positive for HIV.
- The Philadelphia 76ers' Charles Barkley honored Johnson by switching from his usual number 34 to 32, which he wore for the entire season. The 76ers had retired the number in honor of Billy Cunningham, who un-retired it for Barkley to wear.
- Due to back problems, Boston Celtics star Larry Bird retires at the end of the season, and since Bill Russell vs. Wilt Chamberlain it brings one of the most memorable eras in NBA history (Magic vs. Bird) to a close.
- After a season in the Western Conference's Midwest Division, the Orlando Magic move back to the Eastern Conference, playing in the Atlantic Division. The 27 teams of the NBA would remain in the same four divisions until 2004, when the league would realign into six divisions.
- The sport of basketball would celebrate its centennial anniversary of its creation on December 21, 1991.
- The 1992 NBA All-Star Game was played at the Orlando Arena in Orlando, Florida, with the West defeating the East 153–113. In an emotionally charged game, Magic Johnson wins the game's MVP award.
- In the wake of the 1992 Los Angeles riots, the Los Angeles Lakers and Los Angeles Clippers rescheduled and relocated their home first-round playoff games. Game 4 of the Lakers-Blazers series was played at Thomas & Mack Center in Las Vegas, while Game 4 of the Clippers-Jazz series was played at the Anaheim Convention Center.
- Luc Longley, drafted by the Timberwolves, becomes the first Australian to play in the NBA. He would later play in three Bulls championship teams.
- Larry Brown became the first to coach two different NBA teams in a single season after resigning from the San Antonio Spurs to coach the Los Angeles Clippers. Brown led the Clippers to the team's first winning season since their relocation to Los Angeles in addition to ending their fifteen-year playoff drought.
- The season marked the last time the Boston Celtics would win 50 games (they won 51) until the 2008 season.
- Following the first round loss to the New York Knicks, Detroit Pistons head coach Chuck Daly resigned, ending the Pistons' "Bad Boys" era.
- On December 17, the Cleveland Cavaliers crushed the Miami Heat by a score of 148–80. This 68-point win by the Cavaliers stood as a record for nearly three decades until the Memphis Grizzlies defeated the Oklahoma City Thunder by 73 points 152–79 on December 2, 2021.
- Run TMC, consisting of Golden State Warriors players Tim Hardaway, Chris Mullin and Mitch Richmond, was disbanded when Richmond was traded to the Sacramento Kings for Billy Owens.
- The Utah Jazz played their first season at the Delta Center.
- The Phoenix Suns played their final season at the Arizona Veterans Memorial Coliseum.
- The Chicago Bulls set a franchise record with 67 wins in a season (later broken by the 1996 team).
- The NBA Finals and Stanley Cup Final both had their games played in Chicago, causing a potential scheduling conflict with each other. However, this was rendered moot as the Blackhawks were swept in four games by the Pittsburgh Penguins, who ended up winning their second consecutive Stanley Cup.
- Dennis Rodman recorded 1,530 rebounds and averaged 18.7 rebounds per game in the regular season, both of which were the highest figures since 1972. It is the first of an NBA record seven consecutive rebounding titles for Rodman.
- Michael Jordan scored 35 points in the first half of Game 1 of the 1992 NBA Finals, setting records for most points in a Finals half and most three-pointers in a half (six) until the latter was broken by the Houston Rockets' Kenny Smith (seven) in 1995. He also set a new NBA record for the most times a player has won a championship and led the league in scoring in the same season.
- The Miami Heat were the first of the four late 1980s expansion franchises to make it to the playoffs, but were swept in the first round by the Bulls.
- The Milwaukee Bucks failed to qualify for the playoffs for the first time since 1978-79.
- All NBA teams sported patches on their warmups commemorating basketball's centennial anniversary.

== 1991–92 NBA changes ==
- The New Jersey Nets changed their road uniforms to a darker blue color.
- The Philadelphia 76ers changed their uniforms, adding stars to their jerseys.
- The Portland Trail Blazers changed their logo and uniforms.
- The Utah Jazz moved into the Delta Center.

== Standings ==
=== By division ===
Eastern Conference

| Atlantic Division | W | L | PCT | GB | Home | Road | Div |
|---|---|---|---|---|---|---|---|
| y-Boston Celtics | 51 | 31 | .622 | — | 34–7 | 17–24 | 19–9 |
| x-New York Knicks | 51 | 31 | .622 | — | 30–11 | 21–20 | 20–8 |
| x-New Jersey Nets | 40 | 42 | .488 | 11 | 25–16 | 15–26 | 15–13 |
| x-Miami Heat | 38 | 44 | .463 | 13 | 28–13 | 10–31 | 14–14 |
| Philadelphia 76ers | 35 | 47 | .427 | 16 | 23–18 | 12–29 | 15–13 |
| Washington Bullets | 25 | 57 | .305 | 26 | 14–27 | 11–30 | 7–21 |
| Orlando Magic | 21 | 61 | .256 | 30 | 13–28 | 8–33 | 8–20 |

| Central Division | W | L | PCT | GB | Home | Road | Div |
|---|---|---|---|---|---|---|---|
| y-Chicago Bulls | 67 | 15 | .817 | — | 36–5 | 31–10 | 22–6 |
| x-Cleveland Cavaliers | 57 | 25 | .695 | 10 | 35–6 | 22–19 | 21–7 |
| x-Detroit Pistons | 48 | 34 | .585 | 19 | 25–16 | 23–18 | 15–13 |
| x-Indiana Pacers | 40 | 42 | .488 | 27 | 26–15 | 14–27 | 13–15 |
| Atlanta Hawks | 38 | 44 | .463 | 29 | 23–18 | 15–26 | 7–21 |
| Milwaukee Bucks | 31 | 51 | .378 | 36 | 25–16 | 6–35 | 10–18 |
| Charlotte Hornets | 31 | 51 | .378 | 36 | 22–19 | 9–32 | 10–18 |

Western Conference

| Midwest Division | W | L | PCT | GB | Home | Road | Div |
|---|---|---|---|---|---|---|---|
| y-Utah Jazz | 55 | 27 | .671 | — | 37–4 | 18–23 | 20–6 |
| x-San Antonio Spurs | 47 | 35 | .573 | 8 | 31–10 | 16–25 | 18–8 |
| Houston Rockets | 42 | 40 | .512 | 13 | 28–13 | 14–27 | 12–14 |
| Denver Nuggets | 24 | 58 | .293 | 31 | 18–23 | 6–35 | 8–18 |
| Dallas Mavericks | 22 | 60 | .268 | 33 | 15–26 | 7–34 | 11–15 |
| Minnesota Timberwolves | 15 | 67 | .183 | 40 | 9–32 | 6–35 | 9–17 |

| Pacific Division | W | L | PCT | GB | Home | Road | Div |
|---|---|---|---|---|---|---|---|
| y-Portland Trail Blazers | 57 | 25 | .695 | — | 33–8 | 24–17 | 21–9 |
| x-Golden State Warriors | 55 | 27 | .671 | 2 | 31–10 | 24–17 | 19–11 |
| x-Phoenix Suns | 53 | 29 | .646 | 4 | 36–5 | 17–24 | 17–13 |
| x-Seattle SuperSonics | 47 | 35 | .573 | 10 | 28–13 | 19–22 | 16–14 |
| x-Los Angeles Clippers | 45 | 37 | .549 | 12 | 29–12 | 16–25 | 13–17 |
| x-Los Angeles Lakers | 43 | 39 | .524 | 14 | 24–17 | 19–22 | 13–17 |
| Sacramento Kings | 29 | 53 | .354 | 28 | 21–20 | 8–33 | 6–24 |

=== By conference ===
| # | Eastern Conference | | | | |
| # | Team | W | L | PCT | GB |
|---|---|---|---|---|---|
| 1 | z-Chicago Bulls | 67 | 15 | .817 | – |
| 2 | y-Boston Celtics | 51 | 31 | .622 | 16 |
| 3 | x-Cleveland Cavaliers | 57 | 25 | .695 | 10 |
| 4 | x-New York Knicks | 51 | 31 | .622 | 16 |
| 5 | x-Detroit Pistons | 48 | 34 | .585 | 19 |
| 6 | x-New Jersey Nets | 40 | 42 | .488 | 27 |
| 7 | x-Indiana Pacers | 40 | 42 | .488 | 27 |
| 8 | x-Miami Heat | 38 | 44 | .463 | 29 |
| 9 | Atlanta Hawks | 38 | 44 | .463 | 29 |
| 10 | Philadelphia 76ers | 35 | 47 | .427 | 32 |
| 11 | Milwaukee Bucks | 31 | 51 | .378 | 36 |
| 12 | Charlotte Hornets | 31 | 51 | .378 | 36 |
| 13 | Washington Bullets | 25 | 57 | .305 | 42 |
| 14 | Orlando Magic | 21 | 61 | .256 | 46 |

| # | Western Conference | | | | |
| # | Team | W | L | PCT | GB |
|---|---|---|---|---|---|
| 1 | c-Portland Trail Blazers | 57 | 25 | .695 | – |
| 2 | y-Utah Jazz | 55 | 27 | .671 | 2 |
| 3 | x-Golden State Warriors | 55 | 27 | .671 | 2 |
| 4 | x-Phoenix Suns | 53 | 29 | .646 | 4 |
| 5 | x-San Antonio Spurs | 47 | 35 | .573 | 10 |
| 6 | x-Seattle SuperSonics | 47 | 35 | .573 | 10 |
| 7 | x-Los Angeles Clippers | 45 | 37 | .549 | 12 |
| 8 | x-Los Angeles Lakers | 43 | 39 | .524 | 14 |
| 9 | Houston Rockets | 42 | 40 | .512 | 15 |
| 10 | Sacramento Kings | 29 | 53 | .354 | 28 |
| 11 | Denver Nuggets | 24 | 58 | .293 | 33 |
| 12 | Dallas Mavericks | 22 | 60 | .268 | 35 |
| 13 | Minnesota Timberwolves | 15 | 67 | .183 | 42 |

Notes

- z – Clinched home court advantage for the entire playoffs
- c – Clinched home court advantage for the conference playoffs
- y – Clinched division title
- x – Clinched playoff spot

== Playoffs ==
Teams in bold advanced to the next round. The numbers to the left of each team indicate the team's seeding in its conference, and the numbers to the right indicate the number of games the team won in that round. The division champions are marked by an asterisk. Home court advantage does not necessarily belong to the higher-seeded team, but instead the team with the better regular season record; teams enjoying the home advantage are shown in italics.

First round
**E1** | **Chicago*** | **3**
E8 | Miami | 0
**E4** | **New York** | **3**
E5 | Detroit | 2
**E3** | **Cleveland** | **3**
E6 | New Jersey | 1
**E2** | **Boston*** | **3**
E7 | Indiana | 0
**W1** | **Portland*** | **3**
W8 | LA Lakers | 1
**W4** | **Phoenix** | **3**
W5 | San Antonio | 0
W3 | Golden State | 1
**W6** | **Seattle** | **3**
**W2** | **Utah*** | **3**
W7 | LA Clippers | 2

Quarter-finals
**E1** | **Chicago*** | **4**
E4 | New York | 3
**E3** | **Cleveland** | **4**
E2 | Boston* | 3
**W1** | **Portland*** | **4**
W4 | Phoenix | 1
W6 | Seattle | 1
**W2** | **Utah*** | **4**

Semi-finals
**E1** | **Chicago*** | **4**
E3 | Cleveland | 2
**W1** | **Portland*** | **4**
W2 | Utah* | 2

Final
**E1** | **Chicago*** | **4**
W1 | Portland* | 2

- * Division winner
- **Bold** Series winner
- Italic Team with home-court advantage

== Statistics leaders ==
| Category | Player | Team | Stat |
|---|---|---|---|
| Points per game | Michael Jordan | Chicago Bulls | 30.1 |
| Rebounds per game | Dennis Rodman | Detroit Pistons | 18.7 |
| Assists per game | John Stockton | Utah Jazz | 13.7 |
| Steals per game | John Stockton | Utah Jazz | 2.98 |
| Blocks per game | David Robinson | San Antonio Spurs | 4.49 |
| FG% | Buck Williams | Portland Trail Blazers | .604 |
| FT% | Mark Price | Cleveland Cavaliers | .947 |
| 3FG% | Dana Barros | Seattle SuperSonics | .446 |

== NBA awards ==
- Most Valuable Player: Michael Jordan, Chicago Bulls
- Rookie of the Year: Larry Johnson, Charlotte Hornets
- Defensive Player of the Year: David Robinson, San Antonio Spurs
- Sixth Man of the Year: Detlef Schrempf, Indiana Pacers
- Most Improved Player: Pervis Ellison, Washington Bullets
- Coach of the Year: Don Nelson, Golden State Warriors

- All-NBA First Team:
  - F – Karl Malone, Utah Jazz
  - F – Chris Mullin, Golden State Warriors
  - C – David Robinson, San Antonio Spurs
  - G – Michael Jordan, Chicago Bulls
  - G – Clyde Drexler, Portland Trail Blazers

- All-NBA Second Team:
  - F – Scottie Pippen, Chicago Bulls
  - F – Charles Barkley, Philadelphia 76ers
  - C – Patrick Ewing, New York Knicks
  - G – Tim Hardaway, Golden State Warriors
  - G – John Stockton, Utah Jazz

- All-NBA Third Team:
  - F – Dennis Rodman, Detroit Pistons
  - F – Kevin Willis, Atlanta Hawks
  - C – Brad Daugherty, Cleveland Cavaliers
  - G – Mark Price, Cleveland Cavaliers
  - G – Kevin Johnson, Phoenix Suns

- NBA All-Rookie First Team:
  - Steve Smith, Miami Heat
  - Larry Johnson, Charlotte Hornets
  - Billy Owens, Golden State Warriors
  - Stacey Augmon, Atlanta Hawks
  - Dikembe Mutombo, Denver Nuggets

- NBA All-Rookie Second Team:
  - Terrell Brandon, Cleveland Cavaliers
  - Rick Fox, Boston Celtics
  - Mark Macon, Denver Nuggets
  - Stanley Roberts, Orlando Magic
  - Larry Stewart, Washington Bullets

- NBA All-Defensive First Team:
  - Dennis Rodman, Detroit Pistons
  - Scottie Pippen, Chicago Bulls
  - David Robinson, San Antonio Spurs
  - Michael Jordan, Chicago Bulls
  - Joe Dumars, Detroit Pistons

- NBA All-Defensive Second Team:
  - Larry Nance, Cleveland Cavaliers
  - Buck Williams, Portland Trail Blazers
  - Patrick Ewing, New York Knicks
  - John Stockton, Utah Jazz
  - Micheal Williams, Indiana Pacers

== See also ==
- List of NBA regular season records
