= Kevin Gamble =

American basketball player (born 1965)

Personal information
- Born: November 13, 1965 (age 61) Springfield, Illinois, U.S.
- Listed height: 6 ft 5 in (1.96 m)
- Listed weight: 210 lb (95 kg)

Career information
- High school: Lanphier (Springfield, Illinois)
- College: Lincoln (Illinois) (1983–1985); Iowa (1985–1987)
- NBA draft: 1987: 3rd round, 63rd overall pick
- Drafted by: Portland Trail Blazers
- Playing career: 1987–1997
- Position: Small forward / shooting guard
- Number: 35, 34, 40
- Coaching career: 2002–2018

Career history

Playing
- 1987: Portland Trail Blazers
- 1987–1988: Quad City Thunder
- 1988: Añejo Rum 65
- 1988: Chicago Express
- 1988–1994: Boston Celtics
- 1994–1996: Miami Heat
- 1996–1997: Sacramento Kings

Coaching
- 2002–2010: UIS
- 2012–2018: Central Michigan (assistant)

Career NBA statistics
- Points: 6,154 (9.5 ppg)
- Rebounds: 1,457 (2.2 rpg)
- Assists: 1,300 (2.0 apg)
- Stats at NBA.com
- Stats at Basketball Reference

Kevin Douglas Gamble (born November 13, 1965) is an American former professional basketball player in the National Basketball Association (NBA) and currently a scout with the Toronto Raptors. At 6 ft 5 in (1.96 m), he played as both a shooting guard and small forward.

== Early life ==
Gamble was born in Springfield, Illinois and lived in the city's John Hay public-housing projects with his single mother. Gamble entered Springfield's Lanphier High School; by his senior season, Gamble led the Lions to the 1983 Illinois Class AA State Basketball Championship. He scored 67 points in that season's four tournament games, which culminated with a 57–53 win over Peoria High School. Lanphier finished the 1983 season 30–3, while Gamble was the only Lanphier player selected to the All-Tournament team. In 2009 Gamble was named that year's inductee into the Lanphier Hall of Fame.

== Collegiate career ==
Following high school, Gamble enrolled at Lincoln College in Illinois, where he played for two seasons under head coach Alan Pickering. After two seasons at Lincoln, Gamble transferred to the University of Iowa. He was part of a 1985 recruiting class which included B. J. Armstrong, Roy Marble, Les Jepsen and Ed Horton. All five recruits went on to play in the National Basketball Association. Horton and Gamble played together at Lanphier High School.

Under coach George Raveling Gamble played off the bench in his first season at Iowa. After the season, Raveling left Iowa for the University of Southern California. On April 7, 1986, Iowa named Tom Davis as its new head coach. Davis’ arrival reversed Gamble's fortunes, as he became a starter for Iowa in his senior season, and the team began the season with 18 straight wins to earn the #1 ranking in the AP Poll. In the Sweet Sixteen of the 1987 NCAA Division I men's basketball tournament, Gamble hit the winning shot against the University of Oklahoma to send the Hawkeyes to the Elite Eight, where they faced the University of Nevada, Las Vegas. Against UNLV, Gamble attempted a 3-pointer as time expired, but the shot bounced off the rim, ending what was Tom Davis's most successful season at Iowa. Iowa finished with a 30–5 record and a 14-4 mark in the Big Ten Conference.

== Professional career ==
=== Rookie season (1987–1988) ===
Gamble was selected with the 17th pick of the third round (63rd overall) by the Portland Trail Blazers in the 1987 NBA draft. He only played in 19 minutes with Portland before being waived on December 9, 1987.

Gamble then headed to the Continental Basketball Association for the Quad City Thunder, where he averaged 21.1 points per game (ppg) with the team in 1988. Gamble then played in the Philippine Basketball Association for the Añejo Rum 65 in the spring and Chicago Express of the World Basketball League in the summer of 1988.

=== Later career (1988–1996) ===
In the fall of 1988, Gamble returned to the Quad City Thunder and scored 27.8 points in a 12-game stint with the team. On December 15, the Boston Celtics signed Gamble after Larry Bird was injured. Initially a reserve, Gamble started the final six games, where he scored over 15 points and played over 30 minutes per game. In his debut start with the Celtics, a 113–104 win over the Cleveland Cavaliers on April 14, 1989, Gamble had a double-double with 20 points and 10 assists, in addition to grabbing seven rebounds. Gamble played in one playoff game before going down with an injury; the Celtics were swept by the Detroit Pistons in the first round.

Gamble played in 71 games the following season, 1989–1990, averaging 5.1 points in 13.9 minutes-per-game.

After seeing spot duty for two seasons, Gamble assumed a major role with Boston in 1990–91. Gamble played in every game, including 76 starts, and averaged 15.6 points (fourth on the team, behind Bird, Reggie Lewis and Kevin McHale) in 33 minutes per game and helped the Celtics to a 56–26 record and a return to first place in the Atlantic Division. His 58.7% shooting percentage was third-best in the NBA. He also placed second to Scott Skiles of Orlando in the voting for the NBA Most Improved Player Award, the closest finish in the history of the award, with a winning margin of four votes. Gamble's minutes were cut dramatically in the playoffs and he averaged just six points per game against the Indiana Pacers and Detroit Pistons.

Gamble played in all 82 games the next season, starting 77 of them, but the Celtics were eliminated by the Cleveland Cavaliers in the second round of the playoffs. He then saw his starting time drop dramatically in his final two seasons in Boston, playing in 75 games but starting only 29 in 1994. Following the season, Gamble signed a free agent contract with the Miami Heat, playing in 44 games (starting 13) before a late February 1996 trade sent him to the Sacramento Kings. With the Kings, Gamble did not start a game for the remainder of the season. He returned in 1996–97 to play in 62 games and start two, but averaged only five points a game. He did not play for the Kings in 1997–98 and was released by the team on February 20, 1998.

For his NBA career, Gamble averaged 9.5 points with a 50.2% shooting percentage, with a 36% three point percentage and making 81% of free throws. He also averaged 2.2 rebounds and 2.0 assists in 22.4 minutes per game for 649 games.

== Coaching career ==
In 2002, Gamble was named the first head men's basketball coach at the University of Illinois Springfield (UIS), who began play in the American Midwest Conference of the NAIA that season. In his fourth year at the helm, 2005–06, Gamble coached the Prairie Stars to an AMC Tournament championship and a berth in the NAIA National Tournament. The next season, 2006–07, saw the Prairie Stars capture their first AMC regular season title outright, win their second consecutive AMC Tournament and advance to the second round of the NAIA National Tournament. Gamble's team went 11–1 in conference play and 23–9 overall as his continued success earned Gamble his second AMC Coach of the Year honor. Two years later, in 2008–09, the team posted a 21–9 record in their final season of NAIA play. Beginning in 2009–10, the Prairie Stars joined the NCAA's Division II and the Great Lakes Valley Conference. Gamble's team posted an 11–13 record in their first year of NCAA competition.

In June 2010, Gamble resigned as head coach of the University of Illinois Springfield to become the Director of Player Development and Video Operations for Providence College under head coach Keno Davis, whose father Tom Davis formerly coached Gamble at Iowa.

In April 2012, Gamble joined Davis to be an assistant coach at Central Michigan.

On September 5, 2018, it was announced that Gamble was resigning from CMU to take a scouting position with the Toronto Raptors.

== Career playing statistics ==
Legend
GP	Games played	GS	Games started	MPG	Minutes per game
FG%	Field goal percentage	3P%	3-point field goal percentage	FT%	Free throw percentage
RPG	Rebounds per game	APG	Assists per game	SPG	Steals per game
BPG	Blocks per game	PPG	Points per game	**Bold**	Career high
*	Led the league

=== NBA ===
==== Regular season ====
Year	Team	GP	GS	MPG	FG%	3P%	FT%	RPG	APG	SPG	BPG	PPG
1987–88	Portland	9	0	2.1	.000	.000	–	.3	.1	.2	.0	.0
1988–89	Boston	44	6	8.5	.551	.182	.636	1.0	.8	.3	.1	4.3
1989–90	Boston	71	10	13.9	.455	.167	.794	1.6	1.7	.4	.1	5.1
1990–91	Boston	**82***	76	**33.0**	**.587**	.000	.815	3.3	**3.1**	**1.2**	.4	**15.6**
1991–92	Boston	**82**	**77**	30.4	.529	.290	**.885**	**3.5**	2.7	.9	**.5**	13.5
1992–93	Boston	**82**	58	31.0	.507	.374	.826	3.0	2.8	1.0	**.5**	13.3
1993–94	Boston	75	28	25.1	.458	.243	.817	2.1	2.0	.8	.3	11.5
1994–95	Miami	77	0	15.9	.489	.398	.784	1.6	1.5	.7	.1	7.4
1995–96	Miami	44	13	23.5	.394	.418	.868	2.0	1.9	.7	.1	6.9
1995–96	Sacramento	21	0	13.9	.427	.261	.500	1.3	.9	.2	.1	3.9
1996–97	Sacramento	62	2	15.4	.430	**.482**	.700	1.7	1.2	.3	.3	5.0
Career		649	270	22.4	.502	.360	.810	2.2	2.0	.7	.3	9.5

==== Playoffs ====
Year	Team	GP	GS	MPG	FG%	3P%	FT%	RPG	APG	SPG	BPG	PPG
1989	Boston	1	.1	29.0	.364	.000	.000	1.0	2.0	1.0	.0	8.0
1990	Boston	3	0	2.7	**.600**	–	–	.3	.7	.0	.0	2.0
1991	Boston	**11**	**11**	21.6	.483	–	.667	1.2	1.7	.4	.2	6.0
1992	Boston	10	10	33.5	.473	.000	.800	**4.2**	2.3	1.2	**.6**	13.6
1993	Boston	4	4	**35.5**	.548	**.417**	**1.000**	2.3	**2.5**	**1.5**	.3	**13.8**
1996	Sacramento	2	0	1.5	–	–	–	.0	.0	.0	.0	.0
Career		31	26	24.4	.486	.333	.727	2.1	1.8	.7	.3	8.7

== Head coaching record ==
Record table
Season	Team	Overall	Conference	Standing	Postseason
UIS Prairie Stars (NAIA independent) (2002–2003)
2002–03	UIS	13–20			
UIS Prairie Stars (American Midwest Conference) (2003–2009)
2003–04	UIS	12–16	5–7	T–4th	
2004–05	UIS	8–22	4–8	5th	
2005–06	UIS	20–13	9–3	T–1st	NAIA First Round
2006–07	UIS	23–9	11–1	1st	NAIA Second Round
2007–08	UIS	22–10	11–3	T–2nd	
2008–09	UIS	21–9	10–4	T–2nd	
UIS Prairie Stars (Great Lakes Valley Conference) (2009–2010)
2009–10	UIS	11–13	7–10	4th (North)	
UIS:		130–112	57–36		
Total:		130–112			
National champion Postseason invitational champion Conference regular season champion Conference regular season and conference tournament champion Division regular season champion Division regular season and conference tournament champion Conference tournament champion
