= Derek Smith (basketball) =

American basketball player (1961–1996)

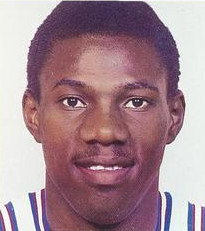
- Smith, circa 1986

Personal information
- Born: November 1, 1961 Hogansville, Georgia, U.S.
- Died: August 9, 1996 (aged 34) On board MS Norwegian Dream
- Listed height: 6 ft 6 in (1.98 m)
- Listed weight: 205 lb (93 kg)

Career information
- High school: Hogansville (Hogansville, Georgia)
- College: Louisville (1978–1982)
- NBA draft: 1982: 2nd round, 35th overall pick
- Drafted by: Golden State Warriors
- Playing career: 1982–1991
- Position: Shooting guard / small forward
- Number: 41, 18, 21, 43
- Coaching career: 1994–1996

Career history

Playing
- 1982–1983: Golden State Warriors
- 1983–1986: San Diego / Los Angeles Clippers
- 1986–1989: Sacramento Kings
- 1989–1990: Philadelphia 76ers
- 1990–1991: Boston Celtics

Coaching
- 1994–1996: Washington Bullets (assistant)

Career highlights
- NCAA champion (1980); Metro Conference co-Player of the Year (1981); 2× First-team All-Metro Conference (1980, 1981)

Career NBA statistics
- Points: 5,232 (12.8 ppg)
- Rebounds: 1,300 (3.2 rpg)
- Assists: 866 (2.1 apg)
- Stats at NBA.com
- Stats at Basketball Reference

Derek Ervin Smith (November 1, 1961 – August 9, 1996) was an American professional basketball player. He won a national championship with the Louisville Cardinals in 1980, and spent nine years in the National Basketball Association (NBA) in a career shortened by a knee injury. Smith went on to become an assistant coach for the Washington Bullets from 1994 until his death two years later.

== Early life ==
Derek Smith grew up in Corinth, Georgia and attended high school in the nearby city of Hogansville. He won two state basketball championships with Hogansville High School, yet was not included in any college recruiting publication.

Smith was first recruited by Louisville Cardinals assistant coach Bill Olsen at the age of 15. He was recommended to Olsen by the college's football player Kenny Robinson, who had also grown up in the Hogansville area.

== College career ==
Smith attended the University of Louisville from 1978 to 1982. Seeing as he had enrolled in primary school early, Smith was only 16 years old at the beginning of his freshman year at college.

Smith was one of the starters for the 1980 University of Louisville Cardinals basketball team which won the NCAA championship, defeating UCLA 59–54.

Smith is sometimes credited with popularizing the term "high five" during the 1979–80 basketball season.

== Professional career ==
=== Golden State Warriors ===
Smith was selected 35th overall, 13th in the second round, by the Golden State Warriors in the 1982 NBA draft. The rookie played sparingly, was used as a power forward and accumulated only 154 minutes in 27 games during his first year in the league. After his rookie season, he was waived by the Warriors and became a free agent.

=== San Diego-Los Angeles Clippers ===
At the request of Portland Trail Blazers general manager Stu Inman, Smith was offered a tryout with the San Diego Clippers. After impressing Clippers head coach Jim Lynam, he was offered a minimum contract for the 1983–84 season. The Georgia native closed out the last 20 games of his season as the team's starting shooting guard and averaged 17.3 points per game.

Smith's play saw considerable improvement in the 1984–85 season, during which he averaged 22.1 points and 5.3 rebounds per game. He received the Player of the Week award three times during the season and was considered a worthy candidate for the 1985 NBA All-Star Game by certain fellow players and journalists. His play also drew praise from Michael Jordan, who called Smith the most underrated player in the NBA.

Smith started off the next season averaging 27.1 points per game in the first nine contests of the season, however, suffered a cartilage tear in his left knee. Smith's season was ultimately limited to 11 games as it was also hampered by mononucleosis.

=== Latter career years ===
With the relationship between Smith and the Clippers souring, the guard signed a 5-year offer sheet with the Sacramento Kings. However, hobbled by injuries and tendinitis in his left knee, Smith struggled to stay on the court and fulfill the expectations the franchise had placed on him.

Smith played for the Kings from 1986 to 1989, for the Philadelphia 76ers in 1989 and 1990, and for the Boston Celtics in 1991, with his statistics declining across the board. Despite only playing in 2 regular season games for the Celtics, he is still remembered by Boston fans for his heroic game 5 performance against the Pacers in the first round of the 1991 playoffs.

In this decisive game, Smith came off the bench to score 12 points and provide rugged defense against Chuck Person. Smith managed to participate in the contest thanks to a knee injection, and his contribution drew heavy praise from teammate Larry Bird.

== Death ==
In August 1996, Smith went on a cruise on the Norwegian Cruise Line ship MS Dreamward for season ticketholders of the Bullets and the Washington Capitals. He took his family along. Smith and then-Bullets player Tim Legler volunteered to hold basketball clinics during the cruise.

On August 9, 1996, while the ship was near Bermuda and returning to New York City, Smith suffered an apparent massive heart attack during a farewell cocktail party in the presence of members of his team. Ship medics attempted to resuscitate him for 25 minutes before declaring him dead.

Smith was buried at Cave Hill Cemetery in Louisville, Kentucky. His funeral was attended by the Bullets team and several former teammates.

== Family ==
Smith was married to Monica, with whom he had two children: a daughter, Sydney, and a son, Nolan. Nolan played college basketball for the Duke Blue Devils and was drafted by the Portland Trail Blazers. In 2010, like his father 30 years before him, Nolan made it to the NCAA D-I tournament; Nolan and his Duke Blue Devils won the National Championship, just as Derek and his Louisville Cardinals had done in 1980. Nolan has a tattoo of his father on his right arm.

In April 2022, Nolan joined the coaching staff at his father's alma mater.

== Career statistics ==
Legend
GP	Games played	GS	Games started	MPG	Minutes per game
FG%	Field goal percentage	3P%	3-point field goal percentage	FT%	Free throw percentage
RPG	Rebounds per game	APG	Assists per game	SPG	Steals per game
BPG	Blocks per game	PPG	Points per game	**Bold**	Career high

=== NBA ===
==== Regular season ====
Year	Team	GP	GS	MPG	FG%	3P%	FT%	RPG	APG	SPG	BPG	PPG
1982–83	Golden State	27	0	5.7	.412	.000	.680	1.4	.1	.0	.1	2.2
1983–84	San Diego	61	20	21.3	.546	.167	.755	2.8	1.3	.5	.4	9.8
1984–85	L.A. Clippers	**80**	**80**	**34.5**	.537	.158	**.794**	**5.3**	2.7	**1.0**	.7	22.1
1985–86	L.A. Clippers	11	9	30.8	**.552**	**.500**	.690	3.7	2.8	.8	**1.2**	**23.5**
1986–87	Sacramento	52	42	31.9	.446	.273	.781	3.5	**3.9**	.9	.4	16.6
1987–88	Sacramento	35	18	25.7	.478	.348	.770	2.9	2.5	.6	.5	12.7
1988–89	Sacramento	29	20	20.7	.402	.200	.674	2.8	2.1	.7	.3	10.0
1988–89	Philadelphia	36	18	19.3	.477	.250	.699	2.4	1.9	.7	.4	7.8
1989–90	Philadelphia	75	7	18.7	.508	.444	.699	2.3	1.5	.5	.3	8.9
1990–91	Boston	2	0	8.0	.250	.000	.750	.0	2.5	.5	.5	2.5
Career		408	214	24.1	.499	.294	.753	3.2	2.1	.6	.4	12.8

==== Playoffs ====
Year	Team	GP	GS	MPG	FG%	3P%	FT%	RPG	APG	SPG	BPG	PPG
1989	Philadelphia	3	**3**	**16.0**	**.643**	–	.500	**2.3**	**1.0**	.3	.0	6.3
1990	Philadelphia	1	0	15.0	.625	.000	.500	.0	**1.0**	**1.0**	.0	**11.0**
1991	Boston	**10**	0	8.6	.429	.000	**.786**	.9	.5	.3	**.1**	2.9
Career		14	3	10.6	.535	.000	.722	1.1	.6	.4	.1	4.2

== See also ==
- List of second-generation NBA players
