= 1990–91 New York Knicks season =

Season of National Basketball Association team the New York Knicks

- Head coach: Stu Jackson (fired) (7–8); John MacLeod (32–35)
- General manager: Al Bianchi; Dave Checketts; Ernie Grunfeld
- Owners: Paramount Communications, Inc.
- Arena: Madison Square Garden

Results
- Record: 39–43 (.476)
- Place: Division: 3rd (Atlantic); Conference: 8th (Eastern)
- Playoff finish: First round (lost to Bulls 0–3)
- Stats at Basketball Reference

Local media
- Television: MSG Network (Marv Albert, John Andariese)
- Radio: WFAN (Jim Karvellas, Walt Frazier)

The 1990–91 New York Knicks season was the 45th season for the Knicks in the National Basketball Association.

== Season summary ==
=== Off-season ===
During the off-season, the Knicks signed free agent John Starks, who played in the Continental Basketball Association the previous season. For the season, the Knicks slightly updated their home and road uniforms, replacing their alternate "NY" logo on the left leg of their shorts with their current primary logo; these uniforms would remain in use until 1992.

=== Regular season ===
The team changed their on-court leadership early in the season, as head coach Stu Jackson was fired, and replaced with John MacLeod after 15 games. The Knicks won six of their first nine games of the regular season, but then lost eight of their next nine games, and later on held a 20–27 record at the All-Star break. However, the team recovered to a 34–33 record near the end of the season, but then went 5–10 in their last 15 games. The Knicks finished in third place in the Atlantic Division with a 39–43 record, and earned the eighth seed in the Eastern Conference for the NBA playoffs.

Patrick Ewing averaged 26.6 points, 11.2 rebounds and 3.2 blocks per game, leading the Knicks in both scoring and blocks, as he was named to the All-NBA Second Team. In addition, Kiki Vandeweghe finished second on the team in scoring, averaging 16.3 points per game, while Gerald Wilkins provided them with 13.8 points per game, and Charles Oakley averaged 11.2 points and led the Knicks with 12.1 rebounds per game. Meanwhile, Maurice Cheeks replaced Mark Jackson as the Knicks' starting point guard this season; Cheeks contributed 7.8 points, 5.7 assists and 1.7 steals per game, while Jackson contributed 8.8 points and 6.3 assists per game off the bench. Also off the bench, Starks provided the Knicks with 7.6 points and 3.3 assists per game, three-point specialist Trent Tucker contributed 7.1 points per game, and Kenny Walker averaged 4.3 points and 2.9 rebounds per game.

During the NBA All-Star weekend at the Charlotte Coliseum in Charlotte, North Carolina, Ewing was selected for the 1991 NBA All-Star Game, as a member of the Eastern Conference All-Star team. Ewing scored 18 points along with 10 rebounds and 4 blocks, as the Eastern Conference defeated the Western Conference, 116–114. Ewing finished in eleventh place in Most Valuable Player voting, and also finished tied in seventh place in Defensive Player of the Year voting. The Knicks finished ninth in the NBA in home-game attendance, with an attendance of 654,962 at Madison Square Garden during the regular season.

=== NBA playoffs ===
In the Eastern Conference First Round of the 1991 NBA playoffs, the Knicks faced off against the top–seeded, and Central Division champion Chicago Bulls, who were led by the trio of All-Star guard and Most Valuable Player of the season Michael Jordan, All-Star forward Scottie Pippen, and Horace Grant. In Game 1, the Knicks suffered a 41-point road loss to the Bulls, 126–85 at Chicago Stadium. After losing Game 2 on the road by a score of 89–79, the Knicks lost Game 3 to the Bulls at home, 103–94 at Madison Square Garden, thus losing the series in a three-game sweep.

The Bulls would advance to the NBA Finals for the first time in franchise history, and defeat the Los Angeles Lakers in five games in the 1991 NBA Finals, winning their first-ever NBA championship.

=== Aftermath ===
Following the season, Cheeks was traded to the Atlanta Hawks, and Tucker was traded to the Phoenix Suns.

== NBA draft ==
Round	Pick	Player	Position	Nationality	College
1	17	Jerrod Mustaf	PF/C	United States	Maryland

== Roster ==
1990–91 New York Knicks roster
Players

Pos.	No.	Player	Height	Weight	DOB	From
G	1	Maurice Cheeks	6 ft 1 in (1.85 m)	180 lb (82 kg)	1956–09–08	West Texas A&M
C	33	Patrick Ewing	7 ft 0 in (2.13 m)	240 lb (109 kg)	1962–08–05	Georgetown
G	14	Greg Grant	5 ft 7 in (1.70 m)	140 lb (64 kg)	1966–08–29	TCNJ
G	13	Mark Jackson	6 ft 1 in (1.85 m)	180 lb (82 kg)	1965–04–01	St. John's
F	32	Jerrod Mustaf	6 ft 10 in (2.08 m)	238 lb (108 kg)	1969–10–28	Maryland
F	34	Charles Oakley	6 ft 8 in (2.03 m)	225 lb (102 kg)	1963–12–18	Virginia Union
G	23	Brian Quinnett	6 ft 8 in (2.03 m)	235 lb (107 kg)	1966–05–30	Washington State
G	3	John Starks	6 ft 3 in (1.91 m)	180 lb (82 kg)	1965–08–10	Oklahoma State
G	6	Trent Tucker	6 ft 5 in (1.96 m)	193 lb (88 kg)	1959–12–20	Minnesota
F	55	Kiki Vandeweghe	6 ft 8 in (2.03 m)	220 lb (100 kg)	1958–08–01	UCLA
F	7	Kenny Walker	6 ft 8 in (2.03 m)	210 lb (95 kg)	1964–08–18	Kentucky
C	45	Eddie Lee Wilkins	6 ft 10 in (2.08 m)	220 lb (100 kg)	1962–05–07	Gardner–Webb
G	21	Gerald Wilkins	6 ft 6 in (1.98 m)	185 lb (84 kg)	1963–09–11	Chattanooga

Coaches
Head coach
- Stu Jackson (fired)
- John MacLeod
Assistant(s)
- Ernie Grunfeld
- Bob Salmi
- Paul Silas
- Jeff Van Gundy

Legend
- (DP) Unsigned draft pick
- (FA) Free agent
- (S) Suspended
- Injured

Roster
Updated: January 23, 1991

== Regular season ==
=== Season standings ===
Atlantic Division	W	L	PCT	GB	Home	Road	Div
y-Boston Celtics	56	26	.683	—	35–6	21–20	20-6
x-Philadelphia 76ers	44	38	.537	12	29-12	15-26	14-12
x-New York Knicks	39	43	.476	17	21-20	18-23	17–9
Washington Bullets	30	52	.366	26	21-20	9-32	10-16
New Jersey Nets	26	56	.317	30	20-21	6–35	8-18
Miami Heat	24	58	.293	32	18-23	6-35	9-17

y – clinched division title
x – clinched playoff spot

#	Eastern Conference				
#	Team	W	L	PCT	GB
1	c-Chicago Bulls	61	21	.744	–
2	y-Boston Celtics	56	26	.683	5
3	x-Detroit Pistons	50	32	.610	11
4	x-Milwaukee Bucks	48	34	.585	13
5	x-Philadelphia 76ers	44	38	.537	17
6	x-Atlanta Hawks	43	39	.524	18
7	x-Indiana Pacers	41	41	.500	20
8	x-New York Knicks	39	43	.476	22
9	Cleveland Cavaliers	33	49	.402	28
10	Washington Bullets	30	52	.366	31
11	New Jersey Nets	26	56	.317	35
12	Charlotte Hornets	26	56	.317	35
13	Miami Heat	24	58	.293	37

z – clinched division title
y – clinched division title
x – clinched playoff spot

== Playoffs ==
1991 playoff game log
First Round: 0–3 (home: 0–1; road: 0–2)

Game	Date	Team	Score	High points	High rebounds	High assists	Location Attendance	Series
1	April 25	@ Chicago	L 85–126	Kiki VanDeWeghe (19)	Charles Oakley (11)	Maurice Cheeks (7)	Chicago Stadium; 18,676	0–1
2	April 28	@ Chicago	L 79–89	Patrick Ewing (24)	Ewing, Oakley (10)	Trent Tucker (3)	Chicago Stadium; 18,676	0–2
3	April 30	Chicago	L 94–103	Ewing, VanDeWeghe (20)	Patrick Ewing (14)	Maurice Cheeks (7)	Madison Square Garden; 18,021	0–3

1991 schedule

== Player statistics ==
Legend
GP	Games played	GS	Games started	MPG	Minutes per game
FG%	Field-goal percentage	3P%	3-point field-goal percentage	FT%	Free-throw percentage
RPG	Rebounds per game	APG	Assists per game	SPG	Steals per game
BPG	Blocks per game	PPG	Points per game

=== Regular season ===
Player	GP	GS	MPG	FG%	3P%	FT%	RPG	APG	SPG	BPG	PPG
Maurice Cheeks	76	64	28.3	.499	.250	.814	2.3	5.7	1.7	.1	7.8
Patrick Ewing	81	81	38.3	.514	.000	.745	11.2	3.0	1.0	3.2	26.6
Greg Grant	22	0	4.9	.370	.333	.833	.5	.9	.4	.0	1.2
Stuart Gray	8	0	4.6	.333		1.000	1.3	.0	.0	.1	1.4
Mark Jackson	72	21	22.2	.492	.255	.731	2.7	6.3	.8	.1	8.8
Jerrod Mustaf	62	5	13.3	.465	.000	.644	2.7	.6	.2	.2	4.3
Charles Oakley	76	74	36.0	.516	.000	.784	12.1	2.7	.8	.2	11.2
Brian Quinnett	68	5	14.9	.459	.349	.722	2.1	.8	.3	.2	4.7
John Starks	61	10	19.2	.439	.290	.752	2.1	3.3	1.0	.3	7.6
Trent Tucker	65	13	18.4	.440	.418	.630	1.6	1.7	.7	.1	7.1
Kiki VanDeWeghe	75	72	32.3	.494	.362	.899	2.4	1.5	.6	.1	16.3
Kenny Walker	54	8	14.3	.435	.000	.780	2.9	.2	.3	.6	4.3
Eddie Lee Wilkins	68	1	9.8	.447	.000	.567	2.6	.2	.3	.1	4.1
Gerald Wilkins	68	56	31.8	.473	.209	.820	3.0	4.0	1.2	.3	13.8

=== Playoffs ===
Player	GP	GS	MPG	FG%	3P%	FT%	RPG	APG	SPG	BPG	PPG
Maurice Cheeks	3	3	33.7	.609	.333	.500	3.0	5.3	1.0	.3	10.0
Patrick Ewing	3	3	36.7	.400		.778	10.0	2.0	.3	1.7	16.7
Mark Jackson	3	0	12.0	.333			.0	2.7	.3	.3	.7
Jerrod Mustaf	3	0	7.3	.800		.800	1.7	.0	.0	.3	4.0
Charles Oakley	3	3	33.3	.476		.500	10.3	1.0	.7	.3	7.7
Brian Quinnett	3	0	12.0	.500	.333		.3	1.0	.3	.0	3.0
John Starks	3	0	9.3	.400		1.000	1.0	2.0	.0	.0	2.0
Trent Tucker	3	2	22.0	.360	.400	1.000	4.0	3.0	.3	.0	8.0
Kiki VanDeWeghe	3	3	33.0	.406	.600	.880	2.7	1.3	.3	.0	17.0
Kenny Walker	3	0	10.3	.500		1.000	2.3	.7	.3	.3	3.3
Eddie Lee Wilkins	1	0	13.0	.667		.500	2.0	.0	.0	.0	9.0
Gerald Wilkins	3	1	26.0	.368	.286	1.000	2.7	1.7	1.7	.3	10.7

== Awards and records ==
- The Knicks won the 1990 McDonald's Open by winning games against Italy's Scavolini Pesaro and Yugoslavia's POP 84.

=== Season ===
- Patrick Ewing was named to the All-NBA Second Team
