= Clinton Smith (basketball) =

American basketball player

Personal information
- Born: January 19, 1964 (age 62) Cleveland, Ohio, U.S.
- Listed height: 6 ft 6 in (1.98 m)
- Listed weight: 210 lb (95 kg)

Career information
- High school: John Adams (Cleveland, Ohio)
- College: Ohio State (1982–1983); Central Arizona CC (1983–1984); Cleveland State (1984–1986)
- NBA draft: 1986: 5th round, 97th overall pick
- Drafted by: Golden State Warriors
- Playing career: 1986–1997
- Position: Small forward
- Number: 11, 22

Career history
- 1986–1987: Golden State Warriors
- 1987–1988: Charleston Gunners
- 1988–1990: Albany Patroons
- 1990: CSP Limoges
- 1990–1991: Albany Patroons
- 1991: Washington Bullets
- 1991: Fort Wayne Fury
- 1991–1992: Albany Patroons
- 1992–1993: Rapid City Thrillers
- 1993–1994: La Crosse Catbirds
- 1995–1997: Fort Wayne Fury

Career highlights
- CBA Defensive Player of the Year (1991); 2× CBA All-Defensive Team (1990, 1991)
- Stats at NBA.com
- Stats at Basketball Reference

Clinton Smith (born January 19, 1964) is an American former basketball player in the National Basketball Association (NBA). A small forward born in Cleveland, Ohio, he went to college at Cleveland State University where he helped lead the 1985–86 team to the Sweet Sixteen. He was drafted in the fifth round by the Golden State Warriors in the 1986 NBA draft and he played two seasons in the NBA.

Smith played in the Continental Basketball Association (CBA) for the Charleston Gunners, Albany Patroons, Fort Wayne Fury, Rapid City Thrillers and La Crosse Catbirds from 1987 to 1997. He was selected as the CBA Defensive Player of the Year in 1991 and named to the All-Defensive Team in 1990 and 1991.

== Career statistics ==
Legend
GP	Games played	GS	Games started	MPG	Minutes per game
FG%	Field goal percentage	3P%	3-point field goal percentage	FT%	Free throw percentage
RPG	Rebounds per game	APG	Assists per game	SPG	Steals per game
BPG	Blocks per game	PPG	Points per game	**Bold**	Career high

=== NBA ===
==== Regular season ====
Year	Team	GP	GS	MPG	FG%	3P%	FT%	RPG	APG	SPG	BPG	PPG
1986–87	Golden State	**41**	0	8.3	.427	.000	**.750**	**1.4**	**1.1**	**.3**	.0	**3.1**
1990–91	Washington	5	0	**9.0**	**.500**	–	.500	.8	.8	.2	.0	1.4
Career		46	0	8.4	.430	.000	.714	1.3	1.1	.3	.0	2.9
