= 1990–91 Washington Bullets season =

NBA professional basketball team season

- Head coach: Wes Unseld
- General manager: John Nash
- Owner: Abe Pollin
- Arena: Capital Centre (37 games); Baltimore Arena (4 games)

Results
- Record: 30–52 (.366)
- Place: Division: 4th (Atlantic); Conference: 10th (Eastern)
- Playoff finish: Did not qualify
- Stats at Basketball Reference

Local media
- Television: WDCA; Home Team Sports
- Radio: WTOP

The 1990–91 Washington Bullets season was the 30th season for the Washington Bullets in the National Basketball Association, and their 18th season in Washington, D.C..

== Season summary ==
=== Off-season ===
During the off-season, the Bullets acquired second-year forward Pervis Ellison from the Sacramento Kings in a three-team trade.

=== Regular season ===
With the addition of Ellison, the Bullets struggled with a 4–10 start to the regular season in November, but later on posted a 9–7 record in January, and held a 21–27 record at the All-Star break. However, the team struggled posting a nine-game losing streak between February and March, and losing ten of their twelve games in February. The Bullets finished in fourth place in the Atlantic Division with a 30–52 record.

Bernard King averaged 28.4 points, 5.0 rebounds and 4.6 assists per game, and was named to the All-NBA Third Team. In addition, Harvey Grant showed improvement averaging 18.2 points and 7.2 rebounds per game, while Ledell Eackles contributed 13.0 points per game, Hot Plate Williams provided with 12.5 points and 5.4 rebounds per game, but only played just 33 games due to a knee injury and weight problems, where he weighed up to 302 lbs. and Ellison averaged 10.4 points, 7.7 rebounds and 2.1 blocks per game. Meanwhile, Darrell Walker averaged 7.8 points, 7.0 rebounds and 6.5 assists per game, while rookie shooting guard A.J. English contributed 8.8 points per game off the bench, and defensive center Charles Jones provided with 2.6 points, 5.8 rebounds and 2.0 blocks per game.

During the NBA All-Star weekend at the Charlotte Coliseum in Charlotte, North Carolina, King was selected for the 1991 NBA All-Star Game, as a member of the Eastern Conference All-Star team; it was his fourth and final All-Star appearance. King finished in 16th place in Most Valuable Player voting, while Grant finished in fourth place in Most Improved Player voting, and with King finishing tied in eighth place. The Bullets finished 26th in the NBA in home-game attendance, with an attendance of 443,683 at the Capital Centre during the regular season, which was the second-lowest in the league.

=== Notable incidents ===
One notable incident of the regular season occurred on April 4, 1991, during a home game against the Portland Trail Blazers at the Capital Centre. Walker, Ellison, head coach Wes Unseld, and the Bullets' mascot "Hoops", were all ejected out of the game by referee Steve Javie, as the Bullets lost to the Trail Blazers, 105–96.

=== Aftermath ===
Following the season, Walker was traded to the Detroit Pistons.

== NBA draft ==
Round	Pick	Player	Position	Nationality	College
2	35	Greg Foster	PF/C	United States	UTEP
2	37	A. J. English	G	United States	Virginia Union

== Roster ==
1990–91 Washington Bullets roster
Players

Pos.	No.	Player	Height	Weight	DOB	From
F	31	Mark Alarie	6 ft 8 in (2.03 m)	217 lb (98 kg)	1963–12–11	Duke
G	21	Ledell Eackles	6 ft 5 in (1.96 m)	220 lb (100 kg)	1966–11–24	LSU New Orleans
C	43	Pervis Ellison	6 ft 9 in (2.06 m)	210 lb (95 kg)	1967–04–03	Louisville
G	14	A. J. English	6 ft 3 in (1.91 m)	175 lb (79 kg)	1967–07–11	Virginia Union
F/C	42	Greg Foster	6 ft 11 in (2.11 m)	240 lb (109 kg)	1968–10–03	UTEP
F	44	Harvey Grant	6 ft 8 in (2.03 m)	195 lb (88 kg)	1965–07–04	Oklahoma
F	12	Tom Hammonds	6 ft 9 in (2.06 m)	215 lb (98 kg)	1967–03–27	Georgia Tech
G	32	Byron Irvin	6 ft 5 in (1.96 m)	190 lb (86 kg)	1966–12–02	Missouri
F/C	23	Charles Jones	6 ft 9 in (2.06 m)	215 lb (98 kg)	1957–04–03	Albany State
F	30	Bernard King	6 ft 7 in (2.01 m)	205 lb (93 kg)	1956–12–04	Tennessee
G	2	Larry Robinson	6 ft 3 in (1.91 m)	180 lb (82 kg)	1968–01–11	Centenary
G	22	Clinton Smith	6 ft 6 in (1.98 m)	210 lb (95 kg)	1964–01–19	Cleveland State
G	5	Darrell Walker	6 ft 4 in (1.93 m)	180 lb (82 kg)	1961–03–09	Arkansas
F	34	John Williams	6 ft 8 in (2.03 m)	235 lb (107 kg)	1966–10–26	LSU
G	3	Haywoode Workman	6 ft 2 in (1.88 m)	180 lb (82 kg)	1966–01–23	Oral Roberts

Coaches
Head coach
- Wes Unseld
Assistant(s)
- Bill Blair
- Jeff Bzdelik

Legend
- (DP) Unsigned draft pick
- (FA) Free agent
- (S) Suspended
- (L) On leave from the team
- Injured

Roster
Updated: April 18, 1991

== Regular season ==
=== Season standings ===
Atlantic Division	W	L	PCT	GB	Home	Road	Div
y-Boston Celtics	56	26	.683	—	35–6	21–20	20-6
x-Philadelphia 76ers	44	38	.537	12	29-12	15-26	14-12
x-New York Knicks	39	43	.476	17	21-20	18-23	17–9
Washington Bullets	30	52	.366	26	21-20	9-32	10-16
New Jersey Nets	26	56	.317	30	20-21	6–35	8-18
Miami Heat	24	58	.293	32	18-23	6-35	9-17

#	Eastern Conference				
#	Team	W	L	PCT	GB
1	c-Chicago Bulls	61	21	.744	–
2	y-Boston Celtics	56	26	.683	5
3	x-Detroit Pistons	50	32	.610	11
4	x-Milwaukee Bucks	48	34	.585	13
5	x-Philadelphia 76ers	44	38	.537	17
6	x-Atlanta Hawks	43	39	.524	18
7	x-Indiana Pacers	41	41	.500	20
8	x-New York Knicks	39	43	.476	22
9	Cleveland Cavaliers	33	49	.402	28
10	Washington Bullets	30	52	.366	31
11	New Jersey Nets	26	56	.317	35
12	Charlotte Hornets	26	56	.317	35
13	Miami Heat	24	58	.293	37

z - clinched division title
y - clinched division title
x - clinched playoff spot

== Player statistics ==
Legend
GP	Games played	GS	Games started	MPG	Minutes per game
FG%	Field-goal percentage	3P%	3-point field-goal percentage	FT%	Free-throw percentage
RPG	Rebounds per game	APG	Assists per game	SPG	Steals per game
BPG	Blocks per game	PPG	Points per game

=== Regular season ===
Washington Bullets statistics
Player	GP	GS	MPG	FG%	3P%	FT%	RPG	APG	SPG	BPG	PPG
Mark Alarie	42	1	14.0	.440	.238	.854	2.8	1.1	.4	.2	5.8
Ledell Eackles	67	17	24.1	.453	.237	.739	1.9	2.0	.7	.1	13.0
Pervis Ellison	76	30	25.6	.513	.000	.650	7.7	1.3	.6	2.1	10.4
A. J. English	70	12	20.6	.439	.097	.707	2.1	2.5	.4	.2	8.8
Greg Foster	54	3	11.2	.460	.000	.689	2.8	.7	.2	.4	4.4
Harvey Grant	77	76	36.9	.498	.133	.743	7.2	2.6	1.2	.8	18.2
Tom Hammonds	70	7	14.6	.461	.000	.722	2.9	.6	.2	.1	5.2
Byron Irvin	33	4	9.6	.465	.200	.820	1.4	.7	.5	.1	5.2
Charles Jones	62	54	24.2	.540		.580	5.8	.8	.8	2.0	2.6
Bernard King	64	64	37.5	.472	.216	.790	5.0	4.6	.9	.3	28.4
Larry Robinson^{†}	12	10	21.3	.418	.000	.583	2.3	2.0	.6	.0	6.9
Clinton Smith	5	0	9.0	.500		.500	.8	.8	.2	.0	1.4
Darrell Walker	71	65	32.5	.430	.000	.604	7.0	6.5	1.1	.5	7.8
John Williams	33	11	28.5	.417	.244	.753	5.4	4.0	1.2	.2	12.5
Haywoode Workman	73	56	27.9	.454	.240	.759	3.3	4.8	1.2	.1	8.0

- ^{†} Denotes player spent time with another team in the season. Stats reflect time with the Bullets only.

Player statistics citation:

== Awards and records ==
- Bernard King, All-NBA Third Team

== See also ==
- 1990–91 NBA season
