= 1989–90 Boston Celtics season =

NBA basketball team season

- Head coach: Jimmy Rodgers
- General manager: Dave Gavitt
- Owners: Don Gaston; Alan N. Cohen; Paul Dupee
- Arena: Boston Garden; Hartford Civic Center

Results
- Record: 52–30 (.634)
- Place: Division: 2nd (Atlantic); Conference: 4th (Eastern)
- Playoff finish: First round (lost to Knicks 2–3)
- Stats at Basketball Reference

Local media
- Television: WLVI (Mike Crispino, Bob Cousy); SportsChannel New England (Mike Gorman, Tom Heinsohn)
- Radio: WEEI (Johnny Most, Glenn Ordway, Doug Brown)

The 1989–90 Boston Celtics season was the 44th season for the Boston Celtics in the National Basketball Association.

== Season summary ==
=== Off-season ===
The Celtics had the 13th overall pick in the 1989 NBA draft, and selected power forward Michael Smith out of Brigham Young University. During the off-season, the team acquired John Bagley from the New Jersey Nets. After only playing just six games in the previous season due to heel injuries, All-Star forward Larry Bird returned to the Celtics. However, last year's first-round draft pick Brian Shaw left the team to play overseas in Italy.

=== Regular season ===
With the return of Bird and despite the loss of Shaw, the Celtics played around .500 in winning percentage with a 7–7 start to the regular season. However, the team won 11 of their next 15 games, and later on held a 28–18 record at the All-Star break. The Celtics won nine of their final ten games, and finished in second place in the Atlantic Division with a solid 52–30 record, earning the fourth seed in the Eastern Conference; the team qualified for the NBA playoffs for the eleventh consecutive year.

Bird averaged 24.3 points, 9.5 rebounds, 7.5 assists and 1.4 steals per game, and was named to the All-NBA Second Team, while sixth man Kevin McHale averaged 20.9 points, 8.3 rebounds and 1.9 blocks per game, and was named to the NBA All-Defensive Second Team, and Reggie Lewis contributed 17.0 points per game. In addition, Robert Parish provided the team with 15.7 points and 10.1 rebounds per game, while Dennis Johnson provided with 7.1 points and 6.5 assists per game. Off the bench, Jim Paxson contributed 6.4 points per game, while Joe Kleine averaged 5.4 points and 4.4 rebounds per game, Kevin Gamble contributed 5.1 points per game, Bagley provided with 4.3 points and 5.5 assists per game, and starting power forward Ed Pinckney averaged 4.7 points and 2.9 rebounds per game.

During the NBA All-Star weekend at the Miami Arena in Miami, Florida, Bird, McHale and Parish were all selected for the 1990 NBA All-Star Game, as members of the Eastern Conference All-Star team; this would be the final All-Star Game Bird would participate in. In addition, Bird also participated in the NBA Three-Point Shootout, and finished tied in tenth place in Most Valuable Player voting.

The Celtics finished 15th in the NBA in home-game attendance, with an attendance of 611,537 at the Boston Garden during the regular season.

=== NBA playoffs ===
In the Eastern Conference First Round of the 1990 NBA playoffs, the Celtics faced off against the 5th–seeded New York Knicks, a team that featured All-Star center Patrick Ewing, Charles Oakley and Maurice Cheeks. The Celtics looked ready to make a serious run, as the team took a 2–0 series lead over the Knicks. In Game 2, the Celtics defeated the Knicks at home, 157–128 at the Boston Garden; the team's 157 points were an NBA playoff record for the most points scored in a game. However, the Celtics lost the next two games to the Knicks on the road, which included a Game 4 loss at Madison Square Garden by a score of 135–108, as the Knicks evened the series. The Celtics lost Game 5 to the Knicks at the Boston Garden, 121–114, thus losing in a hard-fought five-game series.

=== Aftermath ===
Following the season, Johnson and Paxson both retired, and head coach Jimmy Rodgers was fired after coaching the Celtics for two seasons.

== Draft picks ==
Round	Pick	Player	Position	Nationality	College
1	13	Michael Smith	SF/PF	United States	Brigham Young
2	40	Dino Rađa	PF	Yugoslavia	KK Jugoplastika

== Roster ==
1989–90 Boston Celtics roster
Players

Pos.	No.	Player	Height	Weight	DOB	From
G	5	John Bagley	6 ft 0 in (1.83 m)	185 lb (84 kg)	1960–04–23	Boston College
F	33	Larry Bird	6 ft 9 in (2.06 m)	220 lb (100 kg)	1956–12–07	Indiana State
G/F	34	Kevin Gamble	6 ft 5 in (1.96 m)	210 lb (95 kg)	1965–11–13	Iowa
G	3	Dennis Johnson	6 ft 4 in (1.93 m)	185 lb (84 kg)	1954–09–18	Pepperdine
C	53	Joe Kleine	6 ft 11 in (2.11 m)	255 lb (116 kg)	1962–01–04	Arkansas
G	35	Reggie Lewis	6 ft 7 in (2.01 m)	195 lb (88 kg)	1965–11–21	Northeastern
F	32	Kevin McHale	6 ft 10 in (2.08 m)	210 lb (95 kg)	1957–12–19	Minnesota
C	00	Robert Parish	7 ft 0 in (2.13 m)	230 lb (104 kg)	1953–08–30	Centenary
G	4	Jim Paxson	6 ft 6 in (1.98 m)	200 lb (91 kg)	1957–07–09	Dayton
F	54	Ed Pinckney	6 ft 9 in (2.06 m)	195 lb (88 kg)	1963–03–27	Villanova
G	13	Charles Smith	6 ft 1 in (1.85 m)	160 lb (73 kg)	1967–11–29	Georgetown
F	11	Michael Smith	6 ft 10 in (2.08 m)	225 lb (102 kg)	1965–05–19	BYU

Coaches
Head coach
- Jimmy Rodgers
Assistant(s)
- Chris Ford
- Lanny Van Eman

Legend
- (DP) Unsigned draft pick
- (FA) Free agent
- (S) Suspended
- Injured

== Regular season ==
Larry Bird, the Celtics star player, was coming back after surgery to both heels the previous season and later said he never felt the same. Despite the injury, the Celtics were able to rise to 2nd place in the Atlantic Division. By the end of the regular season, the Celtics had scored an average of 110 points per a game, and allowed an average of 106 points per game. During the playoffs against the Knicks that year, the Celtics quickly took the first 2 games of the series, but the New York Knicks would come back and rally to win 3 games in a row, sending the Celtics home.

=== Season standings ===
Atlantic Division	W	L	PCT	GB	Home	Road	Div
y-Philadelphia 76ers	53	29	.646	–	34–7	19–22	19–7
x-Boston Celtics	52	30	.634	1	30–11	22–19	19–7
x-New York Knicks	45	37	.549	8	29–12	16–25	17–9
Washington Bullets	31	51	.378	22	20–21	11–30	10–16
Miami Heat	18	64	.220	35	11–30	7–34	4–22
New Jersey Nets	17	65	.207	36	13–28	4–37	9–17

#	Eastern Conference				
#	Team	W	L	PCT	GB
1	c-Detroit Pistons	59	23	.720	–
2	y-Philadelphia 76ers	53	29	.646	6
3	x-Chicago Bulls	55	27	.671	4
4	x-Boston Celtics	52	30	.634	7
5	x-New York Knicks	45	37	.549	14
6	x-Milwaukee Bucks	44	38	.537	15
7	x-Cleveland Cavaliers	42	40	.512	17
8	x-Indiana Pacers	42	40	.512	17
9	Atlanta Hawks	41	41	.500	18
10	Washington Bullets	31	51	.378	28
11	Miami Heat	18	64	.220	41
12	Orlando Magic	18	64	.220	41
13	New Jersey Nets	17	65	.207	42

== Playoffs ==
1990 playoff game log
First round: 2–3 (home: 2–1; road: 0–2)

Game	Date	Team	Score	High points	High rebounds	High assists	Location Attendance	Series
1	April 26	New York	W 116–105	Larry Bird (24)	Larry Bird (18)	Larry Bird (10)	Boston Garden; 14,890	1–0
2	April 28	New York	W 157–128	Kevin McHale (31)	Robert Parish (16)	Larry Bird (16)	Boston Garden; 14,890	2–0
3	May 2	@ New York	L 99–102	Larry Bird (31)	Robert Parish (10)	Larry Bird (8)	Madison Square Garden; 18,212	2–1
4	May 4	@ New York	L 108–135	Kevin McHale (24)	Larry Bird (8)	Johnson, Bagley (6)	Madison Square Garden; 18,212	2–2
5	May 6	New York	L 114–121	Larry Bird (31)	Bird, Parish (9)	Dennis Johnson (10)	Boston Garden; 14,890	2–3

1990 schedule

== Player statistics ==
Legend
GP	Games played	GS	Games started	MPG	Minutes per game
FG%	Field-goal percentage	3P%	3-point field-goal percentage	FT%	Free-throw percentage
RPG	Rebounds per game	APG	Assists per game	SPG	Steals per game
BPG	Blocks per game	PPG	Points per game

=== Regular season ===
Boston Celtics statistics
Player	GP	GS	MPG	FG%	3P%	FT%	RPG	APG	SPG	BPG	PPG
John Bagley	54	17	20.3	.459	.056	.744	1.6	5.5	.7	.1	4.3
Larry Bird	75	75	39.3	.473	.333	.930	9.5	7.5	1.4	.8	24.3
Kevin Gamble	71	10	13.9	.455	.167	.794	1.6	1.7	.4	.1	5.1
Dennis Johnson	75	65	27.1	.434	.042	.843	2.7	6.5	1.1	.2	7.1
Joe Kleine	81	4	16.9	.480	.000	.830	4.4	.6	.2	.3	5.4
Reggie Lewis	79	54	31.9	.496	.267	.808	4.4	2.8	1.1	.8	17.0
Kevin McHale	82	25	33.2	.549	.333	.893	8.3	2.1	.4	1.9	20.9
Robert Parish	79	78	30.3	.580		.747	10.1	1.3	.5	.9	15.7
Jim Paxson	72	25	17.8	.453	.250	.811	1.1	1.9	.5	.1	6.4
Ed Pinckney	77	50	14.1	.542	.000	.773	2.9	.9	.4	.5	4.7
Charles Smith	60	0	8.7	.444	.000	.697	1.2	1.7	.6	.1	2.9
Michael Smith	65	7	9.5	.476	.071	.828	1.5	1.2	.1	.0	5.0
Kelvin Upshaw^{†}	14	0	9.4	.308	.400	.667	.9	2.0	.1	.1	2.1

=== Playoffs ===
Boston Celtics statistics
Player	GP	GS	MPG	FG%	3P%	FT%	RPG	APG	SPG	BPG	PPG
John Bagley	5	0	14.0	.533	.000	.750	.8	3.4	.8	.2	3.8
Larry Bird	5	5	41.4	.444	.263	.906	9.2	8.8	1.0	1.0	24.4
Kevin Gamble	3	0	2.7	.600			.3	.7	.0	.0	2.0
Dennis Johnson	5	5	32.4	.484	.333	1.000	2.8	5.6	.4	.4	13.8
Joe Kleine	5	0	15.8	.765	.000	.833	2.8	.4	.4	.6	6.2
Reggie Lewis	5	5	40.0	.597	.000	.771	5.0	4.4	1.4	.4	20.2
Kevin McHale	5	5	38.4	.609	.333	.862	7.8	2.6	.4	2.0	22.0
Robert Parish	5	5	34.0	.574		.944	10.0	2.6	1.0	1.4	15.8
Jim Paxson	5	0	12.4	.500	.000	.750	.0	1.4	1.0	.0	3.8
Ed Pinckney	4	0	6.3	.857		.778	1.5	.0	.0	.0	4.8
Charles Smith	3	0	3.0	.500			.3	1.0	.3	.0	.7
Michael Smith	4	0	4.0	.625	.000	1.000	.0	.0	.3	.0	4.3

Player statistics citation:

== Awards and records ==
- Larry Bird, All-NBA Second Team
- Kevin McHale, NBA All-Defensive Second Team

== See also ==
- 1989–90 NBA season
