= 1990–91 Boston Celtics season =

NBA basketball team season

- Division champions
- Head coach: Chris Ford
- General manager: Dave Gavitt
- Owners: Don Gaston; Alan N. Cohen; Paul Dupee
- Arena: Boston Garden; Hartford Civic Center

Results
- Record: 56–26 (.683)
- Place: Division: 1st (Atlantic); Conference: 2nd (Eastern)
- Playoff finish: Conference semifinals (lost to Pistons 2–4)
- Stats at Basketball Reference

Local media
- Television: WFXT (Tom Heinsohn, Bob Cousy); SportsChannel New England (Mike Gorman, Tom Heinsohn)
- Radio: WEEI (Glenn Ordway, Doug Brown)

The 1990–91 Boston Celtics season was the 45th season for the Boston Celtics in the National Basketball Association.

== Season summary ==
=== Off-season ===
The Celtics had the 19th overall pick in the 1990 NBA draft, and selected point guard Dee Brown out of Jacksonville University. During the off-season, the team signed free agent Derek Smith, and hired assistant coach Chris Ford as their new head coach. After playing overseas in Italy the previous season, former Celtics guard Brian Shaw would return to the team after a one-year absence. The Celtics started their season without John Bagley, who would miss the entire regular season due to tendinitis in his right knee; Bagley later on had arthroscopic surgery on his knee in March.

=== Regular season ===
After failing to advance past the first round of the NBA playoffs in the previous two seasons, it appeared that the Celtics were fading as NBA title contenders. However, under Ford and with the addition of Brown, along with the return of Shaw, the Celtics posted two eight-game winning streaks between November and December, and posted a six-game winning streak in January, leading to a 29–5 start to the regular season, reminiscent of their title years of the 1980s, and once again established themselves as contenders. Beginning in January, Larry Bird began to miss significant playing time due to back injuries, missing 22 games as the team struggled in his absence, but managed to hold a 35–12 record at the All-Star break. The Celtics finished in first place in the Atlantic Division with a 56–26 record, and earned the second seed in the Eastern Conference; the team qualified for the NBA playoffs for the twelfth consecutive year.

Bird averaged 19.4 points, 8.5 rebounds, 7.2 assists and 1.8 steals per game, while Reggie Lewis averaged 18.7 points and 5.2 rebounds per game, and sixth man Kevin McHale provided the team with 18.4 points, 7.1 rebounds and 2.1 blocks per game off the bench. In addition, Kevin Gamble contributed 15.6 points per game, while Robert Parish averaged 14.9 points, 10.6 rebounds and 1.3 blocks per game, and Shaw provided with 13.8 points, 7.6 assists and 1.3 steals per game. Off the bench, Brown contributed 8.7 points and 4.2 assists per game, and was named to the NBA All-Rookie First Team, while Ed Pinckney averaged 5.2 points and 4.9 rebounds per game, and Joe Kleine provided with 3.6 points and 3.4 rebounds per game.

During the NBA All-Star weekend at the Charlotte Coliseum in Charlotte, North Carolina, Bird, McHale and Parish were all selected for the 1991 NBA All-Star Game, as members of the Eastern Conference All-Star team, while Ford was selected to coach the Eastern Conference, although Bird did not participate due to injury; it was the final All-Star appearance for both McHale and Parish. Meanwhile, Brown won the NBA Slam Dunk Contest. Bird finished tied in ninth place in Most Valuable Player voting, while Parish finished in 14th place, and McHale finished tied in 19th place; McHale also finished in third place in Sixth Man of the Year voting, while Gamble finished in second place in Most Improved Player voting, behind Scott Skiles of the Orlando Magic, Brown finished in fourth place in Rookie of the Year voting, and Ford finished in third place in Coach of the Year voting.

The Celtics finished 17th in the NBA in home-game attendance, with an attendance of 611,537 at the Boston Garden during the regular season.

=== NBA playoffs ===
In the Eastern Conference First Round of the 1991 NBA playoffs, the Celtics faced off against the 7th–seeded Indiana Pacers, a team that featured All-Star guard Reggie Miller, Chuck Person, and Sixth Man of the Year, Detlef Schrempf. The Celtics took a 2–1 series lead before losing Game 4 to the Pacers on the road, 116–113 at the Market Square Arena as the Pacers evened the series. In Game 5 at the Boston Garden, and during the second quarter, Bird fell down on the court and landed hard on the right side of his face, as he had to go to the locker room; despite the injury, Bird returned to the game and finished with 32 points, as the Celtics defeated the Pacers, 124–121 to win in a hard-fought five-game series.

In the Eastern Conference Semi-finals, the team faced off against the 3rd–seeded, and 2-time defending NBA champion Detroit Pistons, who were led by the All-Star trio of Isiah Thomas, Joe Dumars, and Defensive Player of the Year, Dennis Rodman. However, Bird missed Game 1 due to back spasms as the Pistons defeated the Celtics at the Boston Garden, 86–75. Bird returned for the remainder of the series, as the Celtics won Game 2 at home, 109–103 to even the series, and then won Game 3 over the Pistons on the road by a blowout win, 115–83 at The Palace of Auburn Hills to take a 2–1 series lead. However, the Pistons won the next three games, as the Celtics lost Game 6 at The Palace of Auburn Hills in overtime, 117–113, thus losing the series in six games.

=== Aftermath ===
Following the season, Derek Smith, and second-year forward Michael Smith were both released to free agency.

== Draft picks ==
Round	Pick	Player	Position	Nationality	College
1	19	Dee Brown	SG/PG	United States	Jacksonville

== Roster ==
1990–91 Boston Celtics roster
Players

Pos.	No.	Player	Height	Weight	DOB	From
G	5	John Bagley (injured) (IN)	6 ft 0 in (1.83 m)	185 lb (84 kg)	1960–04–23	Boston College
F	33	Larry Bird	6 ft 9 in (2.06 m)	220 lb (100 kg)	1956–12–07	Indiana State
G	7	Dee Brown	6 ft 1 in (1.85 m)	160 lb (73 kg)	1968–11–29	Jacksonville
G/F	34	Kevin Gamble	6 ft 5 in (1.96 m)	210 lb (95 kg)	1965–11–13	Iowa
C	53	Joe Kleine	6 ft 11 in (2.11 m)	255 lb (116 kg)	1962–01–04	Arkansas
G	35	Reggie Lewis	6 ft 7 in (2.01 m)	195 lb (88 kg)	1965–11–21	Northeastern
F	32	Kevin McHale	6 ft 10 in (2.08 m)	210 lb (95 kg)	1957–12–19	Minnesota
C	00	Robert Parish	7 ft 0 in (2.13 m)	230 lb (104 kg)	1953–08–30	Centenary
F	54	Ed Pinckney	6 ft 9 in (2.06 m)	195 lb (88 kg)	1963–03–27	Villanova
F	42	Dave Popson	6 ft 10 in (2.08 m)	220 lb (100 kg)	1964–05–17	North Carolina
G	20	Brian Shaw	6 ft 6 in (1.98 m)	190 lb (86 kg)	1966–03–22	UC Santa Barbara
G	13	Charles E. Smith	6 ft 1 in (1.85 m)	160 lb (73 kg)	1967–11–29	Georgetown
G	43	Derek Smith	6 ft 6 in (1.98 m)	205 lb (93 kg)	1961–11–01	Louisville
F	11	Michael Smith	6 ft 10 in (2.08 m)	225 lb (102 kg)	1965–05–19	BYU
C	52	Stojko Vranković	7 ft 2 in (2.18 m)	260 lb (118 kg)	1964–01–22	Croatia
G	12	A. J. Wynder	6 ft 2 in (1.88 m)	180 lb (82 kg)	1964–09–11	Fairfield

Coaches
Head coach
- Chris Ford
Assistant(s)
- Don Casey
- Jon Jennings
- Ed Lacerte (trainer)

Legend
- (DP) Unsigned draft pick
- (FA) Free agent
- (S) Suspended
- Injured

Roster
Updated: April 12, 1991

=== Roster notes ===
- Point guard John Bagley was on the injured reserve list due to tendinitis in his right knee, and missed the entire regular season.

== Regular season ==
=== Season standings ===
Atlantic Division	W	L	PCT	GB	Home	Road	Div
y-Boston Celtics	56	26	.683	—	35–6	21–20	20-6
x-Philadelphia 76ers	44	38	.537	12	29-12	15-26	14-12
x-New York Knicks	39	43	.476	17	21-20	18-23	17–9
Washington Bullets	30	52	.366	26	21-20	9-32	10-16
New Jersey Nets	26	56	.317	30	20-21	6–35	8-18
Miami Heat	24	58	.293	32	18-23	6-35	9-17

y – clinched division title
x – clinched playoff spot

#	Eastern Conference				
#	Team	W	L	PCT	GB
1	c-Chicago Bulls	61	21	.744	–
2	y-Boston Celtics	56	26	.683	5
3	x-Detroit Pistons	50	32	.610	11
4	x-Milwaukee Bucks	48	34	.585	13
5	x-Philadelphia 76ers	44	38	.537	17
6	x-Atlanta Hawks	43	39	.524	18
7	x-Indiana Pacers	41	41	.500	20
8	x-New York Knicks	39	43	.476	22
9	Cleveland Cavaliers	33	49	.402	28
10	Washington Bullets	30	52	.366	31
11	New Jersey Nets	26	56	.317	35
12	Charlotte Hornets	26	56	.317	35
13	Miami Heat	24	58	.293	37

z – clinched division title
y – clinched division title
x – clinched playoff spot

=== Game log ===
1990-91 game log
November

Game	Date	Opponent	Score	Location	Record
1	November 2	Cleveland	W 125–101	Boston Garden	1–0
2	November 3	@ New York	W 106–103	Madison Square Garden	2–0
3	November 6	@ Chicago	W 110–108	Chicago Stadium	3–0
4	November 9	Chicago	L 100–120	Boston Garden	3–1
5	November 10	@ New Jersey	W 105–91	Brendan Byrne Arena	4–1
6	November 13	@ Milwaukee	L 91–119	Bradley Center	4–2
7	November 14	Charlotte	W 135–126	Boston Garden	5–2
8	November 16	Utah	W 114–89	Boston Garden	6–2
9	November 17	@ Washington	W 102–90	Capital Centre	7–2
10	November 21	Houston	W 108–95	Boston Garden	8–2
11	November 23	Sacramento	W 115–105	Boston Garden	9–2
12	November 24	@ Cleveland	W 113–102	Richfield Coliseum	10–2
13	November 26	Miami	W 118–101	Hartford Civic Center	11–2
14	November 30	Washington	W 123–95	Boston Garden	12–2

December

Game	Date	Opponent	Score	Location	Record
15	December 1	@ Philadelphia	L 110–116	The Spectrum	12–3
16	December 3	Seattle	W 135–102	Boston Garden	13–3
17	December 5	Denver	W 148–140	Boston Garden	14–3
18	December 7	@ Dallas	W 112–104	Reunion Arena	15–3
19	December 8	@ San Antonio	L 96–102	HemisFair Arena	15–4
20	December 10	@ Houston	W 107–95	The Summit	16–4
21	December 12	Milwaukee	W 129–111	Boston Garden	17–4
22	December 14	Detroit	W 108–100	Boston Garden	18–4
23	December 15	@ Miami	W 114–100	Miami Arena	19–4
24	December 19	Philadelphia	W 115–105	Boston Garden	20–4
25	December 20	@ Charlotte	W 115–96	Charlotte Coliseum	21–4
26	December 23	Atlanta	W 132–104	Boston Garden	22–4
27	December 26	Indiana	W 152–132	Boston Garden	23–4
28	December 28	@ Atlanta	L 114–131	The Omni	23–5

January

Game	Date	Opponent	Score	Location	Record
29	January 2	New York	W 113–86	Boston Garden	24–5
30	January 4	Phoenix	W 132–103	Boston Garden	25–5
31	January 6	Dallas	W 127–110	Boston Garden	26–5
32	January 8	@ New York	W 101–87	Madison Square Garden	27–5
33	January 9	Milwaukee	W 110–102	Boston Garden	28–5
34	January 11	L.A. Clippers	W 109–107	Boston Garden	29–5
35	January 12	@ Washington	L 99–116	Capital Centre	29–6
36	January 16	Golden State	L 105–110	Boston Garden	29–7
37	January 18	New Jersey	L 106–111	Boston Garden	29–8
38	January 21	@ Detroit	L 90–101	The Palace of Auburn Hills	29–9
39	January 23	Detroit	W 111–94	Boston Garden	30–9
40	January 25	@ Philadelphia	L 94–116	The Spectrum	30–10
41	January 27	L.A. Lakers	L 87–104	Boston Garden	30–11
42	January 28	@ Minnesota	W 108–87	Target Center	31–11
43	January 30	Orlando	W 144–102	Boston Garden	32–11

February

Game	Date	Opponent	Score	Location	Record
44	February 1	@ Charlotte	L 91–92	Charlotte Coliseum	32–12
45	February 3	Washington	W 119–101	Boston Garden	33–12
46	February 6	Charlotte	W 133–117	Boston Garden	34–12
47	February 7	@ New York	W 117–101	Madison Square Garden	35–12
48	February 12	@ Seattle	W 114–111	Seattle Center Coliseum	36–12
49	February 14	@ Golden State	W 128–112	Oakland Coliseum	37–12
50	February 15	@ L. A. Lakers	W 98–85	The Forum	38–12
51	February 17	@ Denver	W 126–108	McNichols Sports Arena	39–12
52	February 19	@ Phoenix	L 105–109	Arizona Veterans Memorial Coliseum	39–13
53	February 22	New Jersey	W 111–99	Hartford Civic Center	40–13
54	February 24	@ Indiana	L 109–115	Market Square Arena	40–14
55	February 26	@ Chicago	L 99–129	Chicago Stadium	40–15
56	February 27	Minnesota	W 116–111	Boston Garden	41–15

March

Game	Date	Opponent	Score	Location	Record
57	March 1	San Antonio	W 108–98	Boston Garden	42–15
58	March 3	Portland	L 107–116	Boston Garden	42–16
59	March 4	Indiana	W 126–101	Hartford Civic Center	43–16
60	March 6	Miami	W 126–117	Boston Garden	44–16
61	March 8	@ L. A. Clippers	W 104–98	L.A. Sports Arena	45–16
62	March 10	@ Portland	W 111–109 (OT)	Memorial Coliseum	46–16
63	March 12	@ Sacramento	W 110–95	ARCO Arena	47–16
64	March 13	@ Utah	L 109–112	Salt Palace	47–17
65	March 15	@ Washington	W 94–86	Capital Centre	48–17
66	March 17	Philadelphia	W 110–105	Boston Garden	49–17
67	March 19	@ Atlanta	L 92–104	The Omni	49–18
68	March 20	Washington	W 102–81	Boston Garden	50–18
69	March 22	@ Indiana	L 109–121	Market Square Arena	50–19
70	March 28	@ Miami	L 88–90	Miami Arena	50–20
71	March 29	Cleveland	W 110–108	Boston Garden	51–20
72	March 31	Chicago	W 135–132 (2OT)	Boston Garden	52–20

April

Game	Date	Opponent	Score	Location	Record
73	April 2	@ New Jersey	W 94–77	Brendan Byrne Arena	53–20
74	April 4	New Jersey	W 123–104	Boston Garden	54–20
75	April 6	@ Orlando	L 98–102	Orlando Arena	54–21
76	April 11	@ Milwaukee	L 92–111	Bradley Center	54–22
77	April 12	Miami	W 119–109	Boston Garden	55–22
78	April 14	New York	W 115–102	Boston Garden	56–22
79	April 16	@ Detroit	L 90–118	The Palace of Auburn Hills	56–23
80	April 18	@ Philadelphia	L 97–122	The Spectrum	56–24
81	April 19	@ Cleveland	L 117–124 (OT)	Richfield Coliseum	56–25
82	April 21	Atlanta	L 105–117	Boston Garden	56–26

1990-91 Schedule

== Playoffs ==
1991 playoff game log
First round: 3–2 (home: 2–1; road: 1–1)

Game	Date	Team	Score	High points	High rebounds	High assists	Location Attendance	Series
1	April 26	Indiana	W 127–120	Reggie Lewis (28)	Larry Bird (12)	Larry Bird (12)	Boston Garden; 14,890	1–0
2	April 28	Indiana	L 118–130	Lewis, Shaw (22)	Robert Parish (12)	Larry Bird (10)	Boston Garden; 14,890	1–1
3	May 1	@ Indiana	W 112–105	Kevin McHale (22)	Larry Bird (9)	Brian Shaw (7)	Market Square Arena; 16,530	2–1
4	May 3	@ Indiana	L 113–116	Kevin McHale (24)	Robert Parish (12)	Larry Bird (8)	Market Square Arena; 16,530	2–2
5	May 5	Indiana	W 124–121	Larry Bird (32)	Larry Bird (9)	Brian Shaw (9)	Boston Garden; 14,890	3–2

Conference Semi-finals: 2–4 (home: 1–2; road: 1–2)

Game	Date	Team	Score	High points	High rebounds	High assists	Location Attendance	Series
1	May 7	Detroit	L 75–86	Reggie Lewis (20)	Kevin McHale (10)	Brian Shaw (5)	Boston Garden; 14,890	0–1
2	May 9	Detroit	W 109–103	Reggie Lewis (23)	Robert Parish (13)	Dee Brown (8)	Boston Garden; 14,890	1–1
3	May 11	@ Detroit	W 115–83	Reggie Lewis (21)	Robert Parish (11)	Brown, McHale (6)	The Palace of Auburn Hills; 21,454	2–1
4	May 13	@ Detroit	L 97–104	Kevin McHale (28)	Robert Parish (10)	Brian Shaw (6)	The Palace of Auburn Hills; 21,454	2–2
5	May 15	Detroit	L 111–116	Reggie Lewis (30)	Reggie Lewis (11)	Dee Brown (10)	Boston Garden; 14,890	2–3
6	May 17	@ Detroit	L 113–117 (OT)	Kevin McHale (34)	Ed Pinckney (9)	Reggie Lewis (5)	The Palace of Auburn Hills; 21,454	2–4

1991 schedule

== Player statistics ==
Legend
GP	Games played	GS	Games started	MPG	Minutes per game
FG%	Field-goal percentage	3P%	3-point field-goal percentage	FT%	Free-throw percentage
RPG	Rebounds per game	APG	Assists per game	SPG	Steals per game
BPG	Blocks per game	PPG	Points per game

=== Season ===
Boston Celtics statistics
Player	GP	GS	MPG	FG%	3P%	FT%	RPG	APG	SPG	BPG	PPG
Larry Bird	60	60	38.0	.454	.389	.891	8.5	7.2	1.8	1.0	19.4
Dee Brown	82	5	23.7	.464	.206	.873	2.2	4.2	1.0	0.2	8.7
Kevin Gamble	82	76	33.0	.587	.000	.815	3.3	3.1	1.2	0.4	15.6
Joe Kleine	72	1	11.8	.468	.000	.783	3.4	0.3	0.2	0.2	3.6
Reggie Lewis	79	79	36.4	.491	.077	.826	5.2	2.5	1.2	1.1	18.7
Kevin McHale	68	10	30.4	.553	.405	.829	7.1	1.9	0.4	2.1	18.4
Robert Parish	81	81	30.1	.598	.000	.767	10.6	0.8	0.8	1.3	14.9
Ed Pinckney	70	16	16.6	.539	.000	.897	4.9	0.6	0.9	0.6	5.2
Dave Popson	19	0	3.4	.406	.000	.900	0.7	0.1	0.1	0.1	1.8
Brian Shaw	79	79	35.1	.469	.111	.819	4.7	7.6	1.3	0.4	13.8
Charles E. Smith	5	0	6.0	.429	.000	.600	0.4	1.2	0.2	0.0	1.8
Derek Smith	2	0	8.0	.250	.000	.750	0.0	2.5	0.5	0.5	2.5
Michael Smith	47	3	8.3	.475	.250	.815	1.2	0.9	0.1	0.0	4.6
Stojko Vranković	31	0	5.4	.462	.000	.556	1.6	0.1	0.0	0.9	1.9
A. J. Wynder	6	0	6.5	.250	.000	.750	0.5	1.3	0.2	0.0	2.0

=== Playoffs ===
Boston Celtics statistics
Player	GP	GS	MPG	FG%	3P%	FT%	RPG	APG	SPG	BPG	PPG
Larry Bird	10	10	39.6	.408	.143	.863	7.2	6.5	1.3	0.3	17.1
Dee Brown	11	0	25.8	.491	.000	.824	4.1	3.7	1.0	0.5	12.2
Kevin Gamble	11	11	21.6	.483	.000	.667	1.2	1.7	0.4	0.2	6.0
Joe Kleine	5	1	6.2	.444	.000	.000	2.2	0.2	0.0	0.0	1.6
Reggie Lewis	11	11	42.0	.487	.000	.824	6.2	2.9	1.1	0.5	22.4
Kevin McHale	11	1	34.2	.527	.545	.825	6.5	1.8	0.5	1.3	20.7
Robert Parish	10	10	29.6	.598	.000	.689	9.2	0.6	0.8	0.7	15.8
Ed Pinckney	11	0	15.5	.762	.000	.810	3.6	0.2	0.5	0.2	4.5
Brian Shaw	11	11	28.7	.470	.333	.867	3.5	4.6	0.9	0.1	11.0
Derek Smith	10	0	8.6	.429	.000	.786	0.9	0.5	0.3	0.1	2.9
Michael Smith	2	0	3.0	.500	.000	.000	0.0	0.5	0.0	0.0	1.0
Stojko Vranković	1	0	4.0	1.000	.000	.000	2.0	0.0	0.0	0.0	2.0

Player statistics citation:

== Awards and records ==
- Dee Brown, NBA All-Rookie Team 1st Team

== Transactions ==
Players Added

Draft

- Dee Brown

Free agency

- Dave Popson (August 17, 1990; re-signed December 27, 1990)
- Stojko Vranković (October 2, 1990)
- Derek Smith (December 22, 1990)
- A. J. Wynder (April 12, 1991)
Players Lost

Released

- Jim Paxson (October 6, 1990)
- Dave Popson (June, 1991)

Free agency

- Gerald Paddio (September 27, 1990) (to Cleveland)

Player Transactions Citation:

== See also ==
- 1990–91 NBA season
