= Dave Popson =

American basketball player

Personal information
- Born: May 17, 1964 (age 62) Kingston, Pennsylvania, U.S.
- Listed height: 6 ft 10 in (2.08 m)
- Listed weight: 220 lb (100 kg)

Career information
- High school: Bishop O'Reilly (Kingston, Pennsylvania)
- College: North Carolina (1983–1987)
- NBA draft: 1987: 4th round, 88th overall pick
- Drafted by: Detroit Pistons
- Playing career: 1987–1992
- Position: Power forward
- Number: 45, 41, 42, 50

Career history
- 1987: West Palm Beach Stingrays
- 1987–1988: AS Monaco
- 1988: Los Angeles Clippers
- 1988–1989: Albany Patroons
- 1989: Miami Heat
- 1989: Albany Patroons
- 1989–1990: Oximesa Granada
- 1990–1991: Boston Celtics
- 1991: Albany Patroons
- 1991–1992: Birmingham Bandits
- 1992: Milwaukee Bucks

Career highlights
- McDonald's All-American (1983); First-team Parade All-American (1983); Third-team Parade All-American (1982)
- Stats at NBA.com
- Stats at Basketball Reference

David Gerard Popson (born May 17, 1964) is an American former basketball player who enjoyed a brief National Basketball Association (NBA) career from 1988 until 1992. He played college basketball for the North Carolina Tar Heels.

== Biography ==
Popson, a 6'10" center, played college basketball at the University of North Carolina at Chapel Hill for four years (1983–87). Popson was selected by the Detroit Pistons in the fourth round of the 1987 NBA draft.

Born in Kingston, Pennsylvania, Popson attended Bishop O'Reilly High School where he held nearly all the basketball records.

== Career statistics ==
Legend
GP	Games played	GS	Games started	MPG	Minutes per game
FG%	Field goal percentage	3P%	3-point field goal percentage	FT%	Free throw percentage
RPG	Rebounds per game	APG	Assists per game	SPG	Steals per game
BPG	Blocks per game	PPG	Points per game	**Bold**	Career high

=== NBA ===
Year	Team	GP	GS	MPG	FG%	3P%	FT%	RPG	APG	SPG	BPG	PPG
1988–89	Los Angeles	10	0	**6.8**	**.440**	.000	.500	**1.6**	**0.6**	0.1	**0.2**	**2.3**
1988–89	Miami	7	0	5.4	.333	.000	.500	**1.6**	0.3	0.0	0.1	1.6
1990–91	Boston	**19**	0	3.4	.406	.000	**.900**	0.7	0.1	0.1	0.1	1.8
1991–92	Milwaukee	5	0	5.2	.429	.000	.500	1.0	**0.6**	**0.4**	**0.2**	1.4
Career		41	0	4.8	.405	.000	.750	1.1	0.3	0.1	0.1	1.9

=== College ===
Year	Team	GP	GS	MPG	FG%	3P%	FT%	RPG	APG	SPG	BPG	PPG
1983–84	North Carolina	29	-	6.4	.431	-	.600	1.2	0.4	0.1	0.2	1.9
1984–85	North Carolina	35	-	14.5	.529	-	.738	2.5	0.5	0.2	0.3	6.0
1985–86	North Carolina	34	17	12.1	.504	-	**.846**	2.6	0.6	0.2	0.4	3.9
1986–87	North Carolina	**36**	**34**	**22.3**	**.541**	.000	.771	**4.8**	**1.3**	**0.7**	**0.8**	**10.0**
Career		134	51	14.2	.521	.000	.756	2.9	0.7	0.3	0.4	5.7
