= Reggie Lewis =

American basketball player (1965–1993)

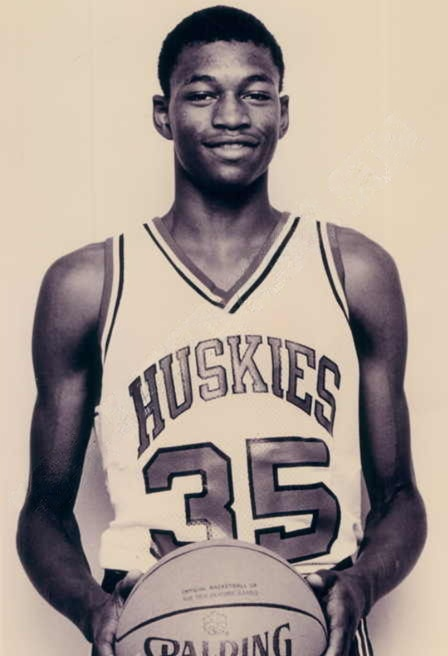
- Lewis with the Northeastern Huskies c. 1984

Personal information
- Born: November 21, 1965 Baltimore, Maryland, U.S.
- Died: July 27, 1993 (aged 27) Waltham, Massachusetts, U.S.
- Listed height: 6 ft 7 in (2.01 m)
- Listed weight: 195 lb (88 kg)

Career information
- High school: Paul Laurence Dunbar (Baltimore, Maryland)
- College: Northeastern (1983–1987)
- NBA draft: 1987: 1st round, 22nd overall pick
- Drafted by: Boston Celtics
- Playing career: 1987–1993
- Position: Shooting guard / small forward
- Number: 35

Career history
- 1987–1993: Boston Celtics

Career highlights
- NBA All-Star (1992); No. 35 retired by Boston Celtics; 3× ECAC North Player of the Year (1985–1987); ECAC North Rookie of the Year (1984); 2× ECAC North tournament MVP (1985, 1987); No. 35 retired by Northeastern Huskies

Career NBA statistics
- Points: 7,902 (17.6 ppg)
- Rebounds: 1,938 (4.3 rpg)
- Assists: 1,153 (2.6 apg)
- Stats at NBA.com
- Stats at Basketball Reference

Reginald C. Lewis (November 21, 1965 – July 27, 1993) was an American professional basketball player for the National Basketball Association's Boston Celtics from 1987 to 1993. Lewis died at the age of 27, and his number was posthumously retired by the team.

== Early life ==
Born in Baltimore, Maryland, Lewis attended high school at Dunbar High School, where he played basketball alongside future NBA players Muggsy Bogues, Reggie Williams and David Wingate. The 1981–82 Dunbar Poets finished the season at 29–0 during Lewis' junior season. The team finished 31–0 during his senior season and was ranked first in the nation by USA Today.

== College career ==
Lewis attended Northeastern University in Boston. Over his four years at Northeastern, Lewis scored 2,708 points, still the all-time record at the university. His Northeastern teams won the ECAC North all four seasons and played in the NCAA men's basketball tournament every year. The 1983–84 Huskies advanced to the second round of the NCAA tournament, falling one point shy of the Sweet 16 when Rolando Lamb scored at the buzzer to lift VCU over the Huskies.

Lewis's uniform number was retired and hangs in tribute in Matthews Arena (the home of Northeastern University's men's basketball team and the Celtics' original home arena in 1946).

== Professional career ==
=== Boston Celtics (1987–1993) ===
Lewis was drafted by the Boston Celtics with the 22nd overall pick in the first round of the 1987 NBA draft. The Celtics were looking to add some youth to the team because its "Big 3" of Larry Bird, Kevin McHale, and Robert Parish was aging. This need became more urgent after the Celtics' Len Bias, the second overall pick in the 1986 NBA draft, died of a cocaine overdose.

As a rookie, Lewis played sporadically, averaging 4.5 points per game. In his second season, Lewis averaged 18.5 points per game.

In 1991, Lewis scored a career-high 42 points during a win against the Miami Heat.

The following season, Lewis was selected to play in his first and only NBA All-Star Game, held in Orlando, Florida. He played 15 minutes, scoring seven points and grabbing four rebounds.

After Larry Bird retired in 1992, Lewis was named the Celtics' captain.

On April 29, 1993, in Game 1 of the Celtics' playoff series against the Charlotte Hornets, Lewis collapsed on the court and remained on the ground for several seconds. After he got up, he looked perplexed and dazed as he headed to the Celtics bench. Lewis briefly returned to the game but was eventually pulled due to dizziness and shortness of breath. He left the game having scored 17 points in 13 minutes of action in what turned out to be his final NBA game.

Lewis averaged 20.8 points per game in each of his last two seasons with the Celtics. In his NBA career, he averaged 17.6 points per contest.

== Personal life ==
Lewis was married to Donna Harris-Lewis. They had two children.

During Lewis's Celtics tenure, he and his family lived in Dedham, Massachusetts.

He was a second cousin of PJ Dozier, who wore the jersey number 35 as a member of the Oklahoma City Thunder in honor of Lewis.

== Illness, death, and aftermath ==
Lewis collapsed on the court during the Celtics' playoff game of April 29, 1993, against the Charlotte Hornets. The following day, he checked into New England Baptist Hospital, where he underwent a series of tests by more than a dozen heart specialists, whom the Celtics called their "dream team" of doctors. Lewis was diagnosed with "focal cardiomyopathy", a disease of the heart muscle that can cause irregular heartbeat and heart failure. Lewis was told his condition was most likely career-ending. However, he later sought a second opinion from Dr. Gilbert Mudge at Brigham and Women's Hospital, who diagnosed Lewis with a less serious condition known as neurocardiogenic syncope. As a result, Lewis began working out in preparation for returning to the Celtics for the 1994–95 season. Mudge was later cleared of any wrongdoing, and he insisted he had never authorized Lewis to resume workouts.

=== Death ===
On July 27, 1993, during off-season practice at Brandeis University in Waltham, Massachusetts, Lewis suffered sudden cardiac death on the basketball court at the age of 27. Two Brandeis University police officers, one of whom was James Crowley, found Lewis and attempted to revive him using mouth-to-mouth resuscitation, but they were unsuccessful.

Lewis's funeral was held on August 2, 1993.

Lewis's death was attributed to hypertrophic cardiomyopathy, a structural heart defect that is the most common cause of death in young athletes.

=== Aftermath ===
Following Lewis' death, questions were raised about whether he had used cocaine and whether cocaine use had contributed to his death. The Wall Street Journal reported that physicians "suspected that cocaine killed Boston Celtics star Reggie Lewis...but they were thwarted by actions of his family and a 'dismissive' policy toward drugs by the NBA." The Journal added the following:

Whether Mr. Lewis died from a heart damaged by cocaine – as many doctors suspected then and now – cannot be definitively shown. What is evident: The official cause of death, a heart damaged by a common-cold virus, is a medically nonsensical finding by a coroner who was under intense pressure from the Lewis family to exclude any implication of drug use.

The Boston Celtics responded by expressing sadness about the "vicious attack on Reggie Lewis and his family" and threatening "to file a $100 million lawsuit against the reporter, The Wall Street Journal, and its parent company, Dow Jones and Co. Inc." Dr. Mudge, who had treated Lewis, was sued for malpractice in connection with Lewis' death; in written responses to questions from the attorneys for Donna Harris-Lewis, Mudge said that "16 days before Lewis collapsed from a heart attack in 1993, he acknowledged having used cocaine, but said he had stopped." On the other hand, the doctor who performed the autopsy on Lewis testified that the scarring on his heart was inconsistent with cocaine use, and other doctors reached the same conclusion though they "stopped short of saying he never used drugs." Also, Lewis's heart tissue tested positive for adenovirus during his autopsy.

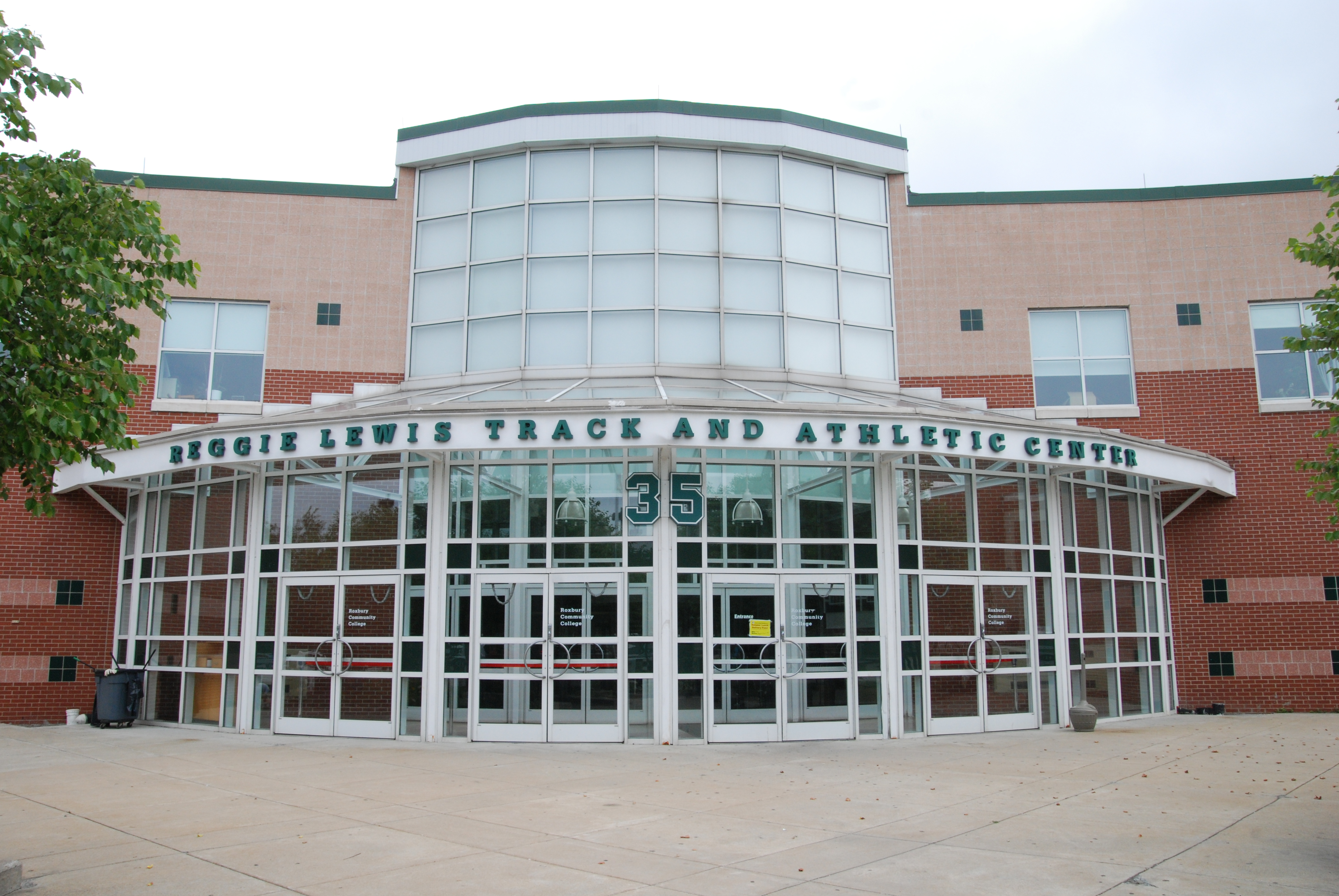
The Reggie Lewis Track and Athletic Center in Boston

On March 22, 1995, the Celtics retired Lewis' jersey. Lewis had worn the number 35 for his entire career. During the ceremony, former teammate Dee Brown made a speech while two other former teammates, Sherman Douglas and Xavier McDaniel, held up Lewis' framed jersey.

Lewis' contract remained on the Celtics' salary cap for two full seasons after his death because at the time the NBA did not have a provision to void contracts if an active player died; NBA Commissioner David Stern suggested that the remaining NBA teams should approve an exemption for Lewis' contract, but the teams refused to do so. The rules were later changed such that a similar case would result in the player's contract being paid by league insurance, as was seen when Chris Bosh had his career truncated in 2017 due to blood clotting issues.

== NBA career statistics ==
Legend
GP	Games played	GS	Games started	MPG	Minutes per game
FG%	Field goal percentage	3P%	3-point field goal percentage	FT%	Free throw percentage
RPG	Rebounds per game	APG	Assists per game	SPG	Steals per game
BPG	Blocks per game	PPG	Points per game	**Bold**	Career high

=== Regular season ===
Year	Team	GP	GS	MPG	FG%	3P%	FT%	RPG	APG	SPG	BPG	PPG
1987–88	Boston	49	0	8.3	.466	.000	.702	1.3	.5	.3	.3	4.5
1988–89	Boston	81	57	32.8	.486	.136	.787	4.7	2.7	**1.5**	.9	18.5
1989–90	Boston	79	54	31.9	.496	**.267**	.808	4.4	2.8	1.1	.8	17.0
1990–91	Boston	79	79	36.4	.491	.077	.826	**5.2**	2.5	1.2	1.1	18.7
1991–92	Boston	**82**	**82**	37.4	**.503**	.238	.851	4.8	2.3	**1.5**	**1.3**	**20.8**
1992–93	Boston	80	80	**39.3**	.470	.233	**.867**	4.3	**3.7**	**1.5**	1.0	**20.8**
Career		450	352	32.6	.488	.200	.824	4.3	2.6	1.3	.9	17.6
All-Star		1	0	15.0	.429	–	.500	4.0	2.0	–	1.0	7.0

=== Playoffs ===
Year	Team	GP	GS	MPG	FG%	3P%	FT%	RPG	APG	SPG	BPG	PPG
1988	Boston	**12**	0	5.8	.382	.000	.600	1.3	.3	.3	.2	2.4
1989	Boston	3	3	41.7	.473	.000	.692	**7.0**	3.7	1.7	.0	20.3
1990	Boston	5	5	40.0	.597	.000	.771	5.0	**4.4**	1.4	.4	20.2
1991	Boston	11	**11**	**42.0**	.487	.000	**.824**	6.2	2.9	1.1	.5	22.4
1992	Boston	10	10	40.8	.528	**.333**	.762	4.3	3.9	**2.4**	.8	**28.0**
1993	Boston	1	1	13.0	**.636**	.000	.750	2.0	1.0	.0	1.0	17.0
Career		42	30	30.4	.510	.133	.777	4.2	2.6	1.2	.5	17.5

== See also ==
- List of basketball players who died during their careers
