= 1991 NBA playoffs =

Postseason tournament

Tournament details
- Dates: April 25–June 12, 1991
- Season: 1990–91
- Teams: 16

Final positions
- Champions: Chicago Bulls (1st title)
- Runners-up: Los Angeles Lakers
- Semifinalists: Detroit Pistons; Portland Trail Blazers

Tournament statistics
- Scoring leader(s): Michael Jordan (Bulls) (31.1 PPG)

Awards
- MVP: Michael Jordan (Bulls)

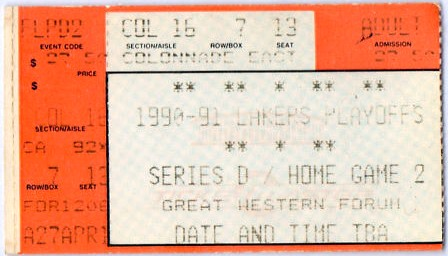
A ticket for Game 2 of the 1991 Western Conference First Round at the Great Western Forum.

The 1991 NBA playoffs was the postseason tournament of the National Basketball Association's 1990–91 season. The tournament concluded with the Eastern Conference champion Chicago Bulls defeating the Western Conference champion Los Angeles Lakers 4 games to 1 in the NBA Finals. Michael Jordan was named NBA Finals MVP.

The Lakers reached the Finals despite not being the top seed in the Western Conference for the first time since 1981, and for just the second time since drafting Magic Johnson first overall in 1979.

After the Detroit Pistons had ended their season the last three years, the Bulls got revenge in the Eastern Conference Finals by sweeping the two-time defending NBA champions. It was the first time the Bulls won a playoff series over the Pistons since 1974, when both teams were still part of the Western Conference. Game 4 ended with some of the Pistons walking off the court before time expired, refusing to shake the Bulls' hands.

This edition marked the first of four consecutive seasons the Bulls and the New York Knicks faced off in the playoffs with the Bulls sweeping the Knicks out of the first round.

The seventh seeded Golden State Warriors stunned the San Antonio Spurs in the first round of the playoffs, defeating them 3 games to 1. It would be Golden State's last playoff series win until 2007.

The 76ers and the Bucks met in the first round of the playoffs where the 76ers swept the series. It would be both teams last playoff appearance until 1999.

Game 4 of the Blazers–Jazz series was the last game ever played at the Salt Palace. The Jazz moved to the Delta Center the following season.

The Spectrum hosted its final NBA playoff game in Game 4 of the Bulls–76ers series. When the 76ers returned to the playoffs in 1999, they had moved to the CoreStates Center, their home since the 1996–97 season.

Game 2 of the Detroit Pistons and Boston Celtics was the last weekday afternoon playoff game until the 2020 NBA bubble. The game was played at 1 PM EST locally.

This was the first year that NBC aired the NBA playoffs.

== Bracket ==
First round	Conference semifinals
E1	Chicago*	3
E8	New York	0
E1	Chicago*	4
E5	Philadelphia	1
E4	Milwaukee	0
E5	Philadelphia	3
Eastern Conference
E3	Detroit	3
E6	Atlanta	2
E3	Detroit	4
E2	Boston*	2
E2	Boston*	3
E7	Indiana	2
W1	Portland*	3
W8	Seattle	2
W1	Portland*	4
W5	Utah	1
W4	Phoenix	1
W5	Utah	3
Western Conference
W3	LA Lakers	3
W6	Houston	0
W3	LA Lakers	4
W7	Golden State	1
W2	San Antonio*	1
W7	Golden State	3

Conference finals
E1	Chicago*	4
E3	Detroit	0
W1	Portland*	2
W3	LA Lakers	4

Finals
E1	Chicago*	4
W3	LA Lakers	1

- * Division winner
- Bold Series winner
- Italic Team with home-court advantage

== First round ==
=== Eastern Conference first round ===
==== (1) Chicago Bulls vs. (8) New York Knicks ====
TNT

April 25
8:00 PM

Boxscore

New York Knicks 85, Chicago Bulls 126
Scoring by quarter: 19–29, 17–36, 21–28, 28–33
Pts: Kiki VanDeWeghe 19; Rebs: Charles Oakley 11; Asts: Maurice Cheeks 7	Pts: Michael Jordan 28; Rebs: Horace Grant 8 Asts: B. J. Armstrong 10
Chicago leads series, 1–0

Chicago Stadium, Chicago, Illinois
Attendance: 18,676
Referees: Nolan Fine, Jess Kersey, Wally Rooney

NBC

April 28
3:30 PM

Boxscore

New York Knicks 79, Chicago Bulls 89
Scoring by quarter: 26–27, 18–15, 19–19, 16–28
Pts: Patrick Ewing 24; Rebs: Ewing, Oakley 10 each Asts: Trent Tucker 3	Pts: Michael Jordan 26; Rebs: Scottie Pippen 8 Asts: Scottie Pippen 7
Chicago leads series, 2–0

Chicago Stadium, Chicago, Illinois
Attendance: 18,676
Referees: Joe Forte, Ron Garretson, Jake O'Donnell

MSG Network

April 30
7:30 PM

Boxscore

Chicago Bulls 103, New York Knicks 94
Scoring by quarter: 25–31, 28–23, 30–17, 20–23
Pts: Michael Jordan 33; Rebs: Scottie Pippen 11; Asts: Michael Jordan 7	Pts: Ewing, VanDeWeghe 20 each Rebs: Patrick Ewing 14; Asts: Maurice Cheeks 7
Chicago wins series, 3–0

Madison Square Garden, New York City, New York
Attendance: 18,021
Referees: Darell Garretson, Steve Javie, Don Vaden

- Michael Jordan's famous dunk on Patrick Ewing.

Regular-season series
Chicago won 4–0 in the regular-season series

December 7, 1990

Recap

New York Knicks 98, Chicago Bulls 108

Chicago Stadium, Chicago, Illinois

February 14, 1991

Recap

Chicago Bulls 102, New York Knicks 92

Madison Square Garden, New York City

April 4, 1991

Recap

Chicago Bulls 101, New York Knicks 91

Madison Square Garden, New York City

April 9, 1991

Recap

New York Knicks 106, Chicago Bulls 108

Chicago Stadium, Chicago, Illinois

This was the third playoff meeting between these two teams, with the Bulls winning the first two meetings.

Previous playoff series
Chicago leads 2–0 in all-time playoff series

1981

Chicago Bulls 2, New York Knicks 0

1981 Eastern Conference First Round

1989

Chicago Bulls 4, New York Knicks 2

1989 Eastern Conference Semifinals

==== (2) Boston Celtics vs. (7) Indiana Pacers ====
TNT

April 26
8:00 PM

Boxscore

Indiana Pacers 120, Boston Celtics 127
Scoring by quarter: 25–36, 31–25, 34–31, 30–35
Pts: Reggie Miller 24; Rebs: Detlef Schrempf 10; Asts: Chuck Person 7	Pts: Reggie Lewis 28; Rebs: Larry Bird 12; Asts: Larry Bird 12
Boston leads series, 1–0

Boston Garden, Boston, Massachusetts
Attendance: 14,890
Referees: Bernie Fryer, Mike Mathis, Bill Saar

NBC

April 28
1:00 PM

Boxscore

Indiana Pacers 130, Boston Celtics 118
Scoring by quarter: 32–36, 32–25, 31–28, 35–29
Pts: Chuck Person 39; Rebs: Dreiling, Schrempf 7 each Asts: Micheal Williams 10	Pts: Lewis, Shaw 22 each Rebs: Robert Parish 12; Asts: Larry Bird 10
Series tied, 1–1

Boston Garden, Boston, Massachusetts
Referees: Darell Garretson, Steve Javie, Ed T. Rush

TNT

May 1
8:00 PM

Boxscore

Boston Celtics 112, Indiana Pacers 105
Scoring by quarter: 29–21, 31–24, 18–24, 34–36
Pts: Kevin McHale 22; Rebs: Larry Bird 9 Asts: Brian Shaw 7	Pts: Miller, Schrempf 20 each Rebs: Detlef Schrempf 10; Asts: Micheal Williams 7
Boston leads series, 2–1

Market Square Arena, Indianapolis, Indiana
Attendance: 16,530
Referees: Bob Delaney, Hugh Evans, Lee Jones

TNT

May 3
8:00 PM

Boxscore

Boston Celtics 113, Indiana Pacers 116
Scoring by quarter: 36–36, 33–28, 26–24, 18–28
Pts: Kevin McHale 24; Rebs: Robert Parish 12; Asts: Larry Bird 8	Pts: Chuck Person 30; Rebs: LaSalle Thompson 7 Asts: Micheal Williams 9
Series tied, 2–2

Market Square Arena, Indianapolis, Indiana
Attendance: 16,530
Referees: Jack Madden, Jack Nies, Bill Oakes

NBC

May 5
1:00 PM

Boxscore

Indiana Pacers 121, Boston Celtics 124
Scoring by quarter: 25–35, 33–23, 33–42, 30–24
Pts: Chuck Person 32; Rebs: LaSalle Thompson 9 Asts: Micheal Williams 10	Pts: Larry Bird 32; Rebs: Larry Bird 9 Asts: Brian Shaw 9
Boston wins series, 3–2

Boston Garden, Boston, Massachusetts
Attendance: 14,890
Referees: Dick Bavetta, Jess Kersey, Ed T. Rush

- Larry Bird came back in the middle of the third quarter despite suffering a concussion in the second and inspired the Celtics' rally.

Regular-season series
Tied 2–2 in the regular-season series

December 26, 1990

Recap

Indiana Pacers 132, Boston Celtics 152

Boston Garden, Boston

February 24, 1991

Recap

Boston Celtics 109, Indiana Pacers 115

Market Square Arena, Indianapolis

March 4, 1991

Recap

Indiana Pacers 101, Boston Celtics 126

Hartford Civic Center, Hartford, Connecticut

March 22, 1991

Recap

Boston Celtics 109, Indiana Pacers 121

Market Square Arena, Indianapolis

This was the first playoff meeting between the Celtics and the Pacers.

==== (3) Detroit Pistons vs. (6) Atlanta Hawks ====
April 26
7:30 PM

Boxscore

Atlanta Hawks 103, Detroit Pistons 98
Scoring by quarter: 26–26, 28–25, 26–19, 23–28
Pts: Dominique Wilkins 32; Rebs: Kevin Willis 8 Asts: Webb, Battle 3 each	Pts: Joe Dumars 20; Rebs: Laimbeer, Rodman 11 each Asts: Isiah Thomas 14
Atlanta leads series, 1–0

The Palace of Auburn Hills, Auburn Hills, Michigan
Attendance: 21,454
Referees: Dan Crawford, Ron Garretson, Jake O'Donnell

TNT

April 28
8:00 PM

Boxscore

Atlanta Hawks 88, Detroit Pistons 101
Scoring by quarter: 18–22, 18–25, 29–29, 23–25
Pts: Dominique Wilkins 20; Rebs: Kevin Willis 9 Asts: Dominique Wilkins 5	Pts: Joe Dumars 28; Rebs: Dennis Rodman 16; Asts: Isiah Thomas 8
Series tied, 1–1

The Palace of Auburn Hills, Auburn Hills, Michigan
Attendance: 21,454
Referees: Bernie Fryer, Mike Mathis, Ronnie Nunn

April 30
7:30 PM

Boxscore

Detroit Pistons 103, Atlanta Hawks 91
Scoring by quarter: 15–30, 29–26, 32–15, 27–20
Pts: Joe Dumars 30; Rebs: Dennis Rodman 13; Asts: Isiah Thomas 13	Pts: Kevin Willis 24; Rebs: Kevin Willis 10; Asts: Spud Webb 9
Detroit leads series, 2–1

Omni Coliseum, Atlanta, Georgia
Attendance: 13,571
Referees: Hue Hollins, Ed T. Rush, Bill Saar

TNT

May 2
8:00 PM

Boxscore

Detroit Pistons 111, Atlanta Hawks 123
Scoring by quarter: 22–25, 37–33, 21–27, 31–38
Pts: Vinnie Johnson 26; Rebs: Dennis Rodman 12; Asts: Isiah Thomas 12	Pts: Doc Rivers 34; Rebs: Wilkins, Malone 11 each Asts: Spud Webb 7
Series tied, 2–2

Omni Coliseum, Atlanta, Georgia
Attendance: 9,854
Referees: Dick Bavetta, Jess Kersey, Tommy Nunez Sr.

NBC

May 5
3:30 PM

Boxscore

Atlanta Hawks 81, Detroit Pistons 113
Scoring by quarter: 21–35, 21–24, 16–31, 23–23
Pts: Kevin Willis 13; Rebs: Kevin Willis 13; Asts: Jon Koncak 4	Pts: Isiah Thomas 26; Rebs: Dennis Rodman 20; Asts: Isiah Thomas 11
Detroit wins series, 3–2

The Palace of Auburn Hills, Auburn Hills, Michigan
Attendance: 21,454
Referees: Joe Crawford, Jack Madden, Bill Oakes

Regular-season series
Detroit won 5–0 in the regular-season series

November 17, 1990

Recap

Atlanta Hawks 83, Detroit Pistons 91

The Palace of Auburn Hills, Auburn Hills, Michigan

November 27, 1990

Recap

Detroit Pistons 120, Atlanta Hawks 97

The Omni, Atlanta

December 21, 1990

Recap

Atlanta Hawks 87, Detroit Pistons 113

The Palace of Auburn Hills, Auburn Hills, Michigan

February 20, 1991

Recap

Atlanta Hawks 89, Detroit Pistons 97

The Palace of Auburn Hills, Auburn Hills, Michigan

April 19, 1991

Recap

Detroit Pistons 126, Atlanta Hawks 120

The Omni, Atlanta

This was the sixth playoff meeting between these two teams, with the Hawks winning three of the first five meetings.

Previous playoff series
Atlanta leads 3–2 in all-time playoff series

1956

Fort Wayne Pistons 3, St. Louis Hawks 2

1956 Western Division Finals

1958

Detroit Pistons 1, St. Louis Hawks 4

1958 Western Division Finals

1963

Detroit Pistons 1, St. Louis Hawks 3

1963 Western Division Semifinals

1986

Atlanta Hawks 3, Detroit Pistons 1

1986 Eastern Conference First Round

1987

Atlanta Hawks 1, Detroit Pistons 4

1987 Eastern Conference Semifinals

==== (4) Milwaukee Bucks vs. (5) Philadelphia 76ers ====
April 25

Boxscore

Philadelphia 76ers 99, Milwaukee Bucks 90
Scoring by quarter: 24–21, 29–20, 25–23, 21–26
Pts: Hersey Hawkins 25; Rebs: Barkley, Mahorn 8 each Asts: Charles Barkley 5	Pts: Frank Brickowski 22; Rebs: Frank Brickowski 9 Asts: Jay Humphries 9
Philadelphia leads series, 1–0

Bradley Center, Milwaukee, Wisconsin
Attendance: 13,587
Referees: Joe Crawford, Lee Jones, Blane Reichelt

TNT

April 27

Boxscore

Philadelphia 76ers 116, Milwaukee Bucks 112 (OT)
Scoring by quarter: 30–24, 20–28, 24–25, 28–25, Overtime: 14–10
Pts: Ron Anderson 24; Rebs: Charles Barkley 13; Asts: Charles Barkley 10	Pts: Alvin Robertson 31; Rebs: Frank Brickowski 12; Asts: Jay Humphries 8
Philadelphia leads series, 2–0

Bradley Center, Milwaukee, Wisconsin
Attendance: 15,623
Referees: Jess Kersey, Paul Mihalak, Don Vaden

- Jay Humphries hits three pointer at the buzzer to force OT.

April 30

Boxscore

Milwaukee Bucks 100, Philadelphia 76ers 121
Scoring by quarter: 24–30, 15–25, 30–27, 31–39
Pts: Alvin Robertson 26; Rebs: Robertson, Brickowski 5 each Asts: Jay Humphries 8	Pts: Charles Barkley 30; Rebs: Charles Barkley 12; Asts: Hawkins, Barkley 6 each
Philadelphia wins series, 3–0

Spectrum, Philadelphia, Pennsylvania
Attendance: 16,239
Referees: Joe Forte, Jack Madden, Ed T. Rush

- Adrian Dantley and Jack Sikma's final NBA game.

Regular-season series
Tied 2–2 in the regular-season series

November 8, 1990

Recap

Philadelphia 76ers 111, Milwaukee Bucks 141

Bradley Center, Milwaukee

December 4, 1990

Recap

Milwaukee Bucks 108, Philadelphia 76ers 109 (OT)

Spectrum, Philadelphia

January 11, 1991

Recap

Philadelphia 76ers 120, Milwaukee Bucks 105

Bradley Center, Milwaukee

April 2, 1991

Recap

Milwaukee Bucks 121, Philadelphia 76ers 104

Spectrum, Philadelphia

This was the eighth playoff meeting between these two teams, with the 76ers winning four of the first seven meetings.

Previous playoff series
Philadelphia leads 4–3 in all-time playoff series

1970

Milwaukee Bucks 4, Philadelphia 76ers 1

1970 Eastern Division Semifinals

1981

Milwaukee Bucks 3, Philadelphia 76ers 4

1981 Eastern Conference Semifinals

1982

Milwaukee Bucks 2, Philadelphia 76ers 4

1982 Eastern Conference Semifinals

1983

Milwaukee Bucks 1, Philadelphia 76ers 4

1983 Eastern Conference Finals

1985

Milwaukee Bucks 0, Philadelphia 76ers 4

1985 Eastern Conference Semifinals

1986

Milwaukee Bucks 4, Philadelphia 76ers 3

1986 Eastern Conference Semifinals

1987

Milwaukee Bucks 3, Philadelphia 76ers 2

1987 Eastern Conference First Round

- This is the most recent playoff series between the 76ers & Bucks until 2001.

=== Western Conference first round ===
==== (1) Portland Trail Blazers vs. (8) Seattle SuperSonics ====
TNT

April 26

Boxscore

Seattle SuperSonics 102, Portland Trail Blazers 110
Scoring by quarter: 23–31, 20–19, 29–28, 30–32
Pts: Eddie Johnson 33; Rebs: Benoit Benjamin 9 Asts: Gary Payton 8	Pts: Clyde Drexler 39; Rebs: Kevin Duckworth 13; Asts: Clyde Drexler 9
Portland leads series, 1–0

Memorial Coliseum, Portland, Oregon
Attendance: 12,884
Referees: Dick Bavetta, Jack Madden, Greg Willard

TNT

April 28

Boxscore

Seattle SuperSonics 106, Portland Trail Blazers 115
Scoring by quarter: 24–29, 25–24, 26–26, 31–36
Pts: Eddie Johnson 28; Rebs: Kemp, Cage 11 each Asts: Payton, McMillan 6 each	Pts: Clyde Drexler 22; Rebs: Kevin Duckworth 10; Asts: Clyde Drexler 10
Portland leads series, 2–0

Memorial Coliseum, Portland, Oregon
Attendance: 12,884
Referees: Bruce Alexander, Tommy Nunez Sr., Ed T. Rush

April 30

Boxscore

Portland Trail Blazers 99, Seattle SuperSonics 102
Scoring by quarter: 24–25, 21–29, 32–25, 22–23
Pts: Clyde Drexler 23; Rebs: Buck Williams 11; Asts: Clyde Drexler 11	Pts: Sedale Threatt 29; Rebs: Shawn Kemp 9 Asts: Nate McMillan 6
Portland leads series, 2–1

Seattle Center Coliseum, Seattle, Washington
Attendance: 14,476
Referees: Mike Mathis, Ed Middleton, Bennett Salvatore

May 2

Boxscore

Portland Trail Blazers 89, Seattle SuperSonics 101
Scoring by quarter: 27–29, 17–23, 28–24, 17–25
Pts: Jerome Kersey 20; Rebs: Williams, Robinson 9 each Asts: Jerome Kersey 5	Pts: Eddie Johnson 34; Rebs: Benjamin, McKey 9 each Asts: Gary Payton 7
Series tied, 2–2

Seattle Center Coliseum, Seattle, Washington
Attendance: 13,367
Referees: Joe Crawford, Paul Mihalak, Ronnie Nunn

NBC

May 4

Boxscore

Seattle SuperSonics 107, Portland Trail Blazers 119
Scoring by quarter: 25–30, 18–33, 25–27, 39–29
Pts: Kemp, Johnson 17 each Rebs: Benoit Benjamin 6 Asts: Gary Payton 7	Pts: Terry Porter 23; Rebs: Buck Williams 12; Asts: Terry Porter 11
Portland wins series, 3–2

Memorial Coliseum, Portland, Oregon
Attendance: 12,884

Regular-season series
Portland won 4–0 in the regular-season series

December 1, 1990

Recap

Portland Trail Blazers 130, Seattle SuperSonics 124 (3OT)

Seattle Center Coliseum, Seattle

January 6, 1991

Recap

Seattle SuperSonics 111, Portland Trail Blazers 114

Memorial Coliseum, Portland, Oregon

March 26, 1991

Recap

Seattle SuperSonics 113, Portland Trail Blazers 126

Memorial Coliseum, Portland, Oregon

March 27, 1991

Recap

Portland Trail Blazers 112, Seattle SuperSonics 107

Tacoma Dome, Tacoma, Washington

This was the fourth playoff meeting between these two teams, with the SuperSonics winning two of the first three meetings.

Previous playoff series
Seattle leads 2–1 in all-time playoff series

1978

Portland Trail Blazers 2, Seattle SuperSonics 4

1978 Western Conference Semifinals

1980

Portland Trail Blazers 1, Seattle SuperSonics 2

1980 Western Conference First Round

1983

Portland Trail Blazers 2, Seattle SuperSonics 0

1983 Western Conference First Round

==== (2) San Antonio Spurs vs. (7) Golden State Warriors ====
April 25

Boxscore

Golden State Warriors 121, San Antonio Spurs 130
Scoring by quarter: 30–24, 23–33, 19–36, 49–37
Pts: Mullin, Richmond 29 each Rebs: Chris Mullin 8 Asts: Tim Hardaway 8	Pts: Willie Anderson 38; Rebs: David Robinson 13; Asts: Rod Strickland 13
San Antonio leads series, 1–0

HemisFair Arena, San Antonio, Texas
Attendance: 15,908
Referees: Hugh Evans, Ronnie Nunn, Bill Oakes

NBC

April 27

Boxscore

Golden State Warriors 111, San Antonio Spurs 98
Scoring by quarter: 27–26, 28–21, 29–20, 27–31
Pts: Chris Mullin 27; Rebs: Chris Mullin 7 Asts: Tim Hardaway 9	Pts: David Robinson 28; Rebs: David Robinson 15; Asts: Rod Strickland 7
Series tied, 1–1

HemisFair Arena, San Antonio, Texas
Attendance: 15,908

TNT

May 1

Boxscore

San Antonio Spurs 106, Golden State Warriors 109
Scoring by quarter: 31–34, 28–31, 25–20, 22–24
Pts: David Robinson 27; Rebs: David Robinson 12; Asts: Rod Strickland 7	Pts: Mitch Richmond 27; Rebs: Tim Hardaway 8 Asts: Tim Hardaway 11
Golden State leads series, 2–1

Oakland–Alameda County Coliseum Arena, Oakland, California
Attendance: 15,025
Referees: Dan Crawford, Terry Durham, Jake O'Donnell

TNT

May 3

Boxscore

San Antonio Spurs 97, Golden State Warriors 110
Scoring by quarter: 28–25, 27–37, 18–20, 24–28
Pts: Sean Elliott 23; Rebs: David Robinson 14; Asts: Rod Strickland 8	Pts: Tim Hardaway 32; Rebs: Mitch Richmond 11; Asts: Tim Hardaway 9
Golden State wins series, 3–1

Oakland–Alameda County Coliseum Arena, Oakland, California
Attendance: 15,025
Referees: Joe Forte, Bernie Fryer, Ed T. Rush

Regular-season series
Tied 2–2 in the regular-season series

November 13, 1990

Recap

San Antonio Spurs 124, Golden State Warriors 128

Oakland–Alameda County Coliseum Arena, Oakland, California

February 5, 1991

Recap

Golden State Warriors 112, San Antonio Spurs 106

HemisFair Arena, San Antonio

March 14, 1991

Recap

San Antonio Spurs 101, Golden State Warriors 99

Oakland–Alameda County Coliseum Arena, Oakland, California

April 8, 1991

Recap

Golden State Warriors 105, San Antonio Spurs 115

HemisFair Arena, San Antonio

This was the first playoff meeting between the Warriors and the Spurs.

==== (3) Los Angeles Lakers vs. (6) Houston Rockets ====
TNT

April 25

Boxscore

Houston Rockets 92, Los Angeles Lakers 94
Scoring by quarter: 18–25, 32–26, 16–20, 26–23
Pts: Hakeem Olajuwon 22; Rebs: Hakeem Olajuwon 16; Asts: Maxwell, K. Smith 5 each	Pts: Byron Scott 20; Rebs: Vlade Divac 11; Asts: Magic Johnson 10
LA Lakers lead series, 1–0

Great Western Forum, Inglewood, California
Attendance: 17,505
Referees: Bruce Alexander, Dick Bavetta, Jack Madden

NBC

April 27

Boxscore

Houston Rockets 98, Los Angeles Lakers 109
Scoring by quarter: 16–23, 25–25, 29–26, 28–35
Pts: Vernon Maxwell 31; Rebs: Hakeem Olajuwon 11; Asts: Kenny Smith 7	Pts: James Worthy 29; Rebs: Vlade Divac 10; Asts: Magic Johnson 21
LA Lakers lead series, 2–0

Great Western Forum, Inglewood, California
Attendance: 17,505

TNT

April 30

Boxscore

Los Angeles Lakers 94, Houston Rockets 90
Scoring by quarter: 23–24, 16–22, 27–19, 28–25
Pts: Magic Johnson 38; Rebs: Sam Perkins 13; Asts: Magic Johnson 7	Pts: Thorpe, Olajuwon 21 each Rebs: Hakeem Olajuwon 17; Asts: Kenny Smith 12
LA Lakers win series, 3–0

The Summit, Houston, Texas
Attendance: 16,611
Referees: Jess Kersey, Tommy Nunez Sr., Wally Rooney

- Byron Scott hits the clutch shot with 15 seconds left.

Regular-season series
Los Angeles won 3–1 in the regular-season series

November 15, 1990

Recap

Los Angeles Lakers 108, Houston Rockets 103 (OT)

The Summit, Houston

January 13, 1991

Recap

Houston Rockets 97, Los Angeles Lakers 116

Great Western Forum, Inglewood, California

February 19, 1991

Recap

Los Angeles Lakers 112, Houston Rockets 103

The Summit, Houston

March 3, 1991

Recap

Houston Rockets 104, Los Angeles Lakers 95

Great Western Forum, Inglewood, California

This was the fourth playoff meeting between these two teams, with the Rockets winning two of the first three meetings.

Previous playoff series
Houston leads 2–1 in all-time playoff series

1981

Houston Rockets 2, Los Angeles Lakers 1

1981 Western Conference First Round

1986

Houston Rockets 4, Los Angeles Lakers 1

1986 Western Conference Finals

1990

Houston Rockets 1, Los Angeles Lakers 3

1990 Western Conference First Round

==== (4) Phoenix Suns vs. (5) Utah Jazz ====
April 25

Boxscore

Utah Jazz 129, Phoenix Suns 90
Scoring by quarter: 26–18, 27–22, 44–26, 32–24
Pts: Karl Malone 27; Rebs: Karl Malone 10; Asts: John Stockton 15	Pts: Negele Knight 18; Rebs: Jeff Hornacek 5 Asts: Kevin Johnson 6
Utah leads series, 1–0

Arizona Veterans Memorial Coliseum, Phoenix, Arizona
Attendance: 14,487
Referees: Darell Garretson, Hue Hollins, Jack Nies

TNT

April 27

Boxscore

Utah Jazz 92, Phoenix Suns 102
Scoring by quarter: 23–23, 18–17, 19–26, 32–36
Pts: Jeff Malone 23; Rebs: Karl Malone 14; Asts: John Stockton 11	Pts: Jeff Hornacek 25; Rebs: Andrew Lang 8 Asts: Kevin Johnson 12
Series tied, 1–1

Arizona Veterans Memorial Coliseum, Phoenix, Arizona
Attendance: 14,487
Referees: Hugh Evans, Ed Middleton, Bill Oakes

TNT

April 30

Boxscore

Phoenix Suns 98, Utah Jazz 107
Scoring by quarter: 27–19, 20–32, 26–23, 25–33
Pts: Tom Chambers 26; Rebs: Jeff Hornacek 10; Asts: Kevin Johnson 10	Pts: Karl Malone 32; Rebs: Mike Brown 11; Asts: John Stockton 12
Utah leads series, 2–1

Salt Palace, Salt Lake City, Utah
Attendance: 12,616
Referees: Joe Crawford, Paul Mihalak, Greg Willard

TNT

May 2

Boxscore

Phoenix Suns 93, Utah Jazz 101
Scoring by quarter: 25–19, 23–24, 18–24, 27–34
Pts: Jeff Hornacek 30; Rebs: Tom Chambers 7 Asts: Kevin Johnson 11	Pts: Karl Malone 38; Rebs: Karl Malone 13; Asts: John Stockton 13
Utah wins series, 3–1

Salt Palace, Salt Lake City, Utah
Attendance: 12,616
Referees: Dan Crawford, Mike Mathis, Bennett Salvatore

Regular-season series
Tied 2–2 in the regular-season series

November 2, 1990

Recap

Phoenix Suns 119, Utah Jazz 96

Tokyo Metropolitan Gymnasium, Tokyo, Japan

November 3, 1990

Recap

Utah Jazz 102, Phoenix Suns 101

Tokyo Metropolitan Gymnasium, Tokyo, Japan

February 6, 1991

Recap

Phoenix Suns 99, Utah Jazz 103

Salt Palace, Salt Lake City

April 2, 1991

Recap

Utah Jazz 117, Phoenix Suns 131

Arizona Veterans Memorial Coliseum, Phoenix, Arizona

This was the third playoff meeting between these two teams, with the Suns winning the first two meetings.

Previous playoff series
Phoenix leads 2–0 in all-time playoff series

1984

Phoenix Suns 4, Utah Jazz 2

1984 Western Conference Semifinals

1990

Phoenix Suns 3, Utah Jazz 2

1990 Western Conference First Round

== Conference semifinals ==
=== Eastern Conference semifinals ===
==== (1) Chicago Bulls vs. (5) Philadelphia 76ers ====
NBC

May 4

Boxscore

Philadelphia 76ers 92, Chicago Bulls 105
Scoring by quarter: 20–34, 22–25, 21–24, 29–22
Pts: Charles Barkley 34; Rebs: Charles Barkley 11; Asts: Hawkins, Anderson 3 each	Pts: Michael Jordan 29; Rebs: Horace Grant 9 Asts: Scottie Pippen 7
Chicago leads series, 1–0

Chicago Stadium, Chicago, Illinois
Attendance: 18,676
Referees: Hugh Evans, Ronnie Nunn, Bennett Salvatore

TNT

May 6

Boxscore

Philadelphia 76ers 100, Chicago Bulls 112
Scoring by quarter: 33–33, 20–29, 20–22, 27–28
Pts: Hersey Hawkins 30; Rebs: Charles Barkley 9 Asts: Hersey Hawkins 7	Pts: Michael Jordan 29; Rebs: Scottie Pippen 11; Asts: Michael Jordan 9
Chicago leads series, 2–0

Chicago Stadium, Chicago, Illinois
Attendance: 18,676
Referees: Bernie Fryer, Darell Garretson, Wally Rooney

TNT

May 10

Boxscore

Chicago Bulls 97, Philadelphia 76ers 99
Scoring by quarter: 26–26, 25–21, 25–28, 21–24
Pts: Michael Jordan 46; Rebs: Scottie Pippen 13; Asts: Pippen, Jordan 6 each	Pts: Hersey Hawkins 29; Rebs: Armen Gilliam 11; Asts: Barkley, Turner 7 each
Chicago leads series, 2–1

Spectrum, Philadelphia, Pennsylvania
Attendance: 18,168
Referees: Hue Hollins, Jack Nies, Ed T. Rush

NBC

May 12

Boxscore

Chicago Bulls 101, Philadelphia 76ers 85
Scoring by quarter: 26–20, 26–18, 21–19, 28–28
Pts: Michael Jordan 25; Rebs: Horace Grant 11; Asts: Michael Jordan 12	Pts: Charles Barkley 25; Rebs: Charles Barkley 14; Asts: Charles Barkley 6
Chicago leads series, 3–1

Spectrum, Philadelphia, Pennsylvania
Attendance: 17,514
Referees: Dan Crawford, Bob Delaney, Jake O'Donnell

- 76ers' final playoff game at the Spectrum.

TNT

May 14

Boxscore

Philadelphia 76ers 95, Chicago Bulls 100
Scoring by quarter: 29–30, 22–28, 20–23, 24–19
Pts: Charles Barkley 30; Rebs: Charles Barkley 8 Asts: Charles Barkley 7	Pts: Michael Jordan 38; Rebs: Michael Jordan 19; Asts: Michael Jordan 7
Chicago wins series, 4–1

Chicago Stadium, Chicago, Illinois
Attendance: 18,676
Referees: Dick Bavetta, Joe Crawford, Joe Forte

Regular-season series
Philadelphia won 3–1 in the regular-season series

November 2, 1990

Recap

Philadelphia 76ers 124, Chicago Bulls 116

Chicago Stadium, Chicago

January 9, 1991

Recap

Chicago Bulls 107, Philadelphia 76ers 99

Spectrum, Philadelphia

March 22, 1991

Recap

Chicago Bulls 90, Philadelphia 76ers 95

Spectrum, Philadelphia

April 7, 1991

Recap

Philadelphia 76ers 114, Chicago Bulls 111 (OT)

Chicago Stadium, Chicago

This was the second playoff meeting between these two teams, with the Bulls winning the first meeting.

Previous playoff series
Chicago leads 1–0 in all-time playoff series

1990

Chicago Bulls 4, Philadelphia 76ers 1

1990 Eastern Conference Semifinals

- This is the most recent playoff series between the Bulls & 76ers until 2012.

==== (2) Boston Celtics vs. (3) Detroit Pistons ====
TNT

May 7

Boxscore

Detroit Pistons 86, Boston Celtics 75
Scoring by quarter: 24–22, 16–15, 24–16, 22–22
Pts: James Edwards 18; Rebs: Dennis Rodman 16; Asts: Isiah Thomas 13	Pts: Reggie Lewis 20; Rebs: Kevin McHale 10; Asts: Brian Shaw 5
Detroit leads series, 1–0

Boston Garden, Boston, Massachusetts
Attendance: 14,890
Referees: Dan Crawford, Jack Nies, Jake O'Donnell

TNT

May 9

Boxscore

Detroit Pistons 103, Boston Celtics 109
Scoring by quarter: 21–26, 27–24, 22–21, 33–38
Pts: Joe Dumars 29; Rebs: Bill Laimbeer 15; Asts: Joe Dumars 6	Pts: Reggie Lewis 23; Rebs: Robert Parish 13; Asts: Dee Brown 8
Series tied, 1–1

Boston Garden, Boston, Massachusetts
Attendance: 14,896
Referees: Mike Mathis, Paul Mihalak, Bill Saar

NBC

May 11

Boxscore

Boston Celtics 115, Detroit Pistons 93
Scoring by quarter: 27–19, 27–22, 36–31, 25–21
Pts: Reggie Lewis 21; Rebs: Robert Parish 11; Asts: Brown, McHale 6 each	Pts: James Edwards 13; Rebs: Laimbeer, Rodman 12 each Asts: Vinnie Johnson 5
Boston leads series, 2–1

The Palace of Auburn Hills, Auburn Hills, Michigan
Attendance: 21,454

TNT

May 13

Boxscore

Boston Celtics 97, Detroit Pistons 104
Scoring by quarter: 28–31, 25–22, 23–29, 21–22
Pts: Reggie Lewis 20; Rebs: Robert Parish 10; Asts: Brian Shaw 6	Pts: Mark Aguirre 34; Rebs: Dennis Rodman 18; Asts: Joe Dumars 8
Series tied, 2–2

The Palace of Auburn Hills, Auburn Hills, Michigan
Attendance: 21,454
Referees: Hue Hollins, Ed T. Rush, Bennett Salvatore

TNT

May 15

Boxscore

Detroit Pistons 116, Boston Celtics 111
Scoring by quarter: 32–31, 33–24, 23–20, 28–36
Pts: Joe Dumars 32; Rebs: Dennis Rodman 10; Asts: Joe Dumars 8	Pts: Reggie Lewis 30; Rebs: Reggie Lewis 11; Asts: Dee Brown 10
Detroit leads series, 3–2

Boston Garden, Boston, Massachusetts
Attendance: 14,890
Referees: Hugh Evans, Lee Jones, Bill Oakes

TNT

May 17

Boxscore

Boston Celtics 113, Detroit Pistons 117 (OT)
Scoring by quarter: 23–29, 27–27, 25–26, 30–23, Overtime: 8–12
Pts: Kevin McHale 34; Rebs: Ed Pinckney 9 Asts: Reggie Lewis	Pts: Joe Dumars 32; Rebs: Bill Laimbeer 14; Asts: Joe Dumars 10
Detroit wins series, 4–2

The Palace of Auburn Hills, Auburn Hills, Michigan
Attendance: 21,454
Referees: Dick Bavetta, Jack Madden, Mike Mathis

Regular-season series
Tied 2–2 in the regular-season series

December 14, 1990

Recap

Detroit Pistons 100, Boston Celtics 108

Boston Garden, Boston

January 21, 1991

Recap

Boston Celtics 90, Detroit Pistons 101

The Palace of Auburn Hills, Auburn Hills, Michigan

January 23, 1991

Recap

Detroit Pistons 94, Boston Celtics 111

Boston Garden, Boston

April 16, 1991

Recap

Boston Celtics 90, Detroit Pistons 118

The Palace of Auburn Hills, Auburn Hills, Michigan

This was the sixth playoff meeting between these two teams, with the Celtics winning three of the first five meetings.

Previous playoff series
Boston leads 3–2 in all-time playoff series

1968

Boston Celtics 4, Detroit Pistons 2

1968 Eastern Division Semifinals

1985

Boston Celtics 4, Detroit Pistons 2

1985 Eastern Conference Semifinals

1987

Boston Celtics 4, Detroit Pistons 3

1987 Eastern Conference Finals

1988

Boston Celtics 2, Detroit Pistons 4

1988 Eastern Conference Finals

1989

Boston Celtics 0, Detroit Pistons 3

1989 Eastern Conference First Round

=== Western Conference semifinals ===
==== (1) Portland Trail Blazers vs. (5) Utah Jazz ====
TNT

May 7

Boxscore

Utah Jazz 97, Portland Trail Blazers 117
Scoring by quarter: 25–30, 28–28, 16–24, 28–35
Pts: John Stockton 23; Rebs: Karl Malone 16; Asts: John Stockton 16	Pts: Clyde Drexler 20; Rebs: Clyde Drexler 15; Asts: Terry Porter 9
Portland leads series, 1–0

Memorial Coliseum, Portland, Oregon
Attendance: 12,884
Referees: Hugh Evans, Steve Javie, Ed Middleton

TNT

May 9

Boxscore

Utah Jazz 116, Portland Trail Blazers 118
Scoring by quarter: 25–28, 16–24, 30–35, 45–31
Pts: Karl Malone 40; Rebs: Karl Malone 16; Asts: John Stockton 12	Pts: Jerome Kersey 34; Rebs: Jerome Kersey 6 Asts: Clyde Drexler 15
Portland leads series, 2–0

Memorial Coliseum, Portland, Oregon
Attendance: 12,884
Referees: Dick Bavetta, Ron Garretson, Jack Madden

NBC

May 11

Boxscore

Portland Trail Blazers 101, Utah Jazz 107
Scoring by quarter: 28–28, 18–21, 19–28, 36–30
Pts: Terry Porter 28; Rebs: Drexler, Kersey 10 each Asts: Clyde Drexler 7	Pts: Karl Malone 30; Rebs: Karl Malone 21; Asts: John Stockton 15
Portland leads series, 2–1

Salt Palace, Salt Lake City, Utah
Attendance: 12,616

TNT

May 12

Boxscore

Portland Trail Blazers 104, Utah Jazz 101
Scoring by quarter: 26–22, 31–22, 25–24, 22–33
Pts: Kevin Duckworth 30; Rebs: Duckworth, Drexler 11 each Asts: Clyde Drexler 10	Pts: Karl Malone 31; Rebs: Karl Malone 12; Asts: John Stockton 16
Portland leads series, 3–1

Salt Palace, Salt Lake City, Utah
Attendance: 12,616
Referees: Jess Kersey, Paul Mihalak, Ronnie Nunn

- This was the last game ever played at the Salt Palace.

May 14

Boxscore

Utah Jazz 96, Portland Trail Blazers 103
Scoring by quarter: 24–20, 28–31, 16–27, 28–25
Pts: Karl Malone 26; Rebs: K. Malone, Eaton 8 each Asts: John Stockton 14	Pts: Drexler, Porter 22 each Rebs: Buck Williams 12; Asts: Clyde Drexler 8
Portland wins series, 4–1

Memorial Coliseum, Portland, Oregon
Attendance: 12,884
Referees: Dan Crawford, Darell Garretson, Jack Nies

Regular-season series
Portland won 3–1 in the regular-season series

December 2, 1990

Recap

Utah Jazz 97, Portland Trail Blazers 101

Memorial Coliseum, Portland, Oregon

January 31, 1991

Recap

Portland Trail Blazers 91, Utah Jazz 105

Salt Palace, Salt Lake City

February 15, 1991

Recap

Utah Jazz 105, Portland Trail Blazers 117

Memorial Coliseum, Portland, Oregon

March 15, 1991

Recap

Portland Trail Blazers 106, Utah Jazz 96

Salt Palace, Salt Lake City

This was the second playoff meeting between these two teams, with the Jazz winning the first meeting.

Previous playoff series
Utah leads 1–0 in all-time playoff series

1988

Portland Trail Blazers 1, Utah Jazz 3

1988 Western Conference First Round

==== (3) Los Angeles Lakers vs. (7) Golden State Warriors ====
TNT

May 5

Boxscore

Golden State Warriors 116, Los Angeles Lakers 126
Scoring by quarter: 25–35, 26–25, 32–36, 33–30
Pts: Tim Hardaway 33; Rebs: Alton Lister 8 Asts: Hardaway, Marciulionis 9 each	Pts: Byron Scott 27; Rebs: Magic Johnson 10; Asts: Magic Johnson 17
LA Lakers lead series, 1–0

Great Western Forum, Inglewood, California
Attendance: 17,505
Referees: Steve Javie, Lee Jones, Mike Mathis

TNT

May 8

Boxscore

Golden State Warriors 125, Los Angeles Lakers 124
Scoring by quarter: 35–32, 23–35, 41–30, 26–27
Pts: Chris Mullin 41; Rebs: Jim Petersen 7 Asts: Tim Hardaway 14	Pts: Magic Johnson 44; Rebs: Magic Johnson 12; Asts: Magic Johnson 9
Series tied, 1–1

Great Western Forum, Inglewood, California
Attendance: 17,505
Referees: Joe Crawford, Tommy Nunez Sr., Bill Oakes

TNT

May 10

Boxscore

Los Angeles Lakers 115, Golden State Warriors 112
Scoring by quarter: 35–24, 22–26, 24–28, 34–34
Pts: James Worthy 36; Rebs: three players 7 each Asts: Magic Johnson 15	Pts: Richmond, Hardaway 24 each Rebs: Chris Mullin 11; Asts: Tim Hardaway 12
LA Lakers lead series, 2–1

Oakland–Alameda County Coliseum Arena, Oakland, California

NBC

May 12

Boxscore

Los Angeles Lakers 123, Golden State Warriors 107
Scoring by quarter: 34–26, 27–30, 28–27, 34–24
Pts: Sam Perkins 27; Rebs: Byron Scott 11; Asts: Magic Johnson 11	Pts: Mitch Richmond 26; Rebs: Richmond, Mullin 6 each Asts: Tim Hardaway 9
LA Lakers lead series, 3–1

Oakland–Alameda County Coliseum Arena, Oakland, California
Attendance: 15,025
Referees: Dick Bavetta, Ron Garretson, Jack Madden

TNT

May 14

Boxscore

Golden State Warriors 119, Los Angeles Lakers 124 (OT)
Scoring by quarter: 27–19, 26–27, 31–29, 24–33, Overtime: 11–16
Pts: Tim Hardaway 27; Rebs: Mullin, Lister 8 each Asts: Tim Hardaway 20	Pts: Magic Johnson 28; Rebs: Magic Johnson 14; Asts: Sam Perkins 15
LA Lakers win series, 4–1

Great Western Forum, Inglewood, California
Attendance: 17,505
Referees: Ronnie Nunn, Jake O'Donnell, Wally Rooney

- Sam Perkins hits the game-tying lay-up with 2.4 seconds left to force OT.
- This is the last playoff match-up between Los Angeles & Golden State until 2023.

Regular-season series
Los Angeles won 3–2 in the regular-season series

November 18, 1990

Recap

Golden State Warriors 93, Los Angeles Lakers 115

Great Western Forum, Inglewood, California

December 15, 1990

Recap

Los Angeles Lakers 111, Golden State Warriors 109

Oakland–Alameda County Coliseum Arena, Oakland, California

January 4, 1991

Recap

Los Angeles Lakers 99, Golden State Warriors 115

Oakland–Alameda County Coliseum Arena, Oakland, California

January 6, 1991

Recap

Golden State Warriors 108, Los Angeles Lakers 135

Great Western Forum, Inglewood, California

April 17, 1991

Recap

Los Angeles Lakers 111, Golden State Warriors 118

Oakland–Alameda County Coliseum Arena, Oakland, California

This was the seventh playoff meeting between these two teams, with the Lakers winning five of the first six meetings.

Previous playoff series
Los Angeles leads 5–1 in all-time playoff series

1967

Los Angeles Lakers 0, San Francisco Warriors 3

1967 Western Division Semifinals

1968

Los Angeles Lakers 4, San Francisco Warriors 0

1968 Western Division Finals

1969

Los Angeles Lakers 4, San Francisco Warriors 2

1969 Western Division Semifinals

1973

Golden State Warriors 1, Los Angeles Lakers 4

1973 Western Conference Finals

1977

Golden State Warriors 3, Los Angeles Lakers 4

1977 Western Conference Semifinals

1987

Golden State Warriors 1, Los Angeles Lakers 4

1987 Western Conference Semifinals

== Conference finals ==
=== Eastern Conference finals ===
==== (1) Chicago Bulls vs. (3) Detroit Pistons ====
NBC

May 19
3:30 PM

Boxscore

Detroit Pistons 83, Chicago Bulls 94
Scoring by quarter: 13–24, 24–21, 28–23, 18–26
Pts: Mark Aguirre 25; Rebs: Dennis Rodman 9 Asts: Isiah Thomas 8	Pts: Michael Jordan 22; Rebs: Horace Grant 10; Asts: three players 6 each
Chicago leads series, 1–0

Chicago Stadium, Chicago, Illinois
Attendance: 18,676
Referees: Jess Kersey, Jack Nies, Jake O'Donnell

TNT

May 21
8:00 PM

Boxscore

Detroit Pistons 97, Chicago Bulls 105
Scoring by quarter: 22–27, 19–22, 20–27, 36–29
Pts: Vinnie Johnson 29; Rebs: Dennis Rodman 11; Asts: Dumars, Thomas 5 each	Pts: Michael Jordan 35; Rebs: Scottie Pippen 10; Asts: Michael Jordan 7
Chicago leads series, 2–0

Chicago Stadium, Chicago, Illinois
Attendance: 18,676
Referees: Dan Crawford, Darell Garretson, Steve Javie

NBC

May 25
3:30 PM

Boxscore

Chicago Bulls 113, Detroit Pistons 107
Scoring by quarter: 24–16, 27–27, 31–31, 31–33
Pts: Michael Jordan 33; Rebs: Scottie Pippen 10; Asts: Michael Jordan 7	Pts: Isiah Thomas 29; Rebs: four players 7 each Asts: Isiah Thomas 6
Chicago leads series, 3–0

The Palace of Auburn Hills, Auburn Hills, Michigan
Attendance: 21,454
Referees: Bernie Fryer, Hue Hollins, Ed T. Rush

NBC

May 27
3:30 PM

Boxscore

Chicago Bulls 115, Detroit Pistons 94
Scoring by quarter: 32–26, 25–24, 30–20, 28–24
Pts: Michael Jordan 29; Rebs: Horace Grant 9 Asts: Scottie Pippen 10	Pts: Isiah Thomas 16; Rebs: Thomas, Johnson 7 each Asts: Isiah Thomas 5
Chicago wins series, 4–0

The Palace of Auburn Hills, Auburn Hills, Michigan
Attendance: 21,454
Referees: Joe Crawford, Mike Mathis, Bennett Salvatore

- In their last show of defiance, Isiah Thomas, Bill Laimbeer, and Mark Aguirre of the Pistons walked off the court with 7.9 seconds left in Game 4 so as not to congratulate the Bulls. Only Joe Dumars and John Salley shook hands with any of the Bulls. The Pistons walked off the court without shaking hands with the Bulls, supposedly due to comments by Michael Jordan in a pre-game interview, where he stated that “The Pistons are undeserving champions”, and that “The Bad Boys are bad for basketball.”

Regular-season series
Chicago won 3–2 in the regular-season series

December 19, 1990

Recap

Chicago Bulls 84, Detroit Pistons 105

The Palace of Auburn Hills, Auburn Hills, Michigan

December 25, 1990

Recap

Detroit Pistons 86, Chicago Bulls 98

Chicago Stadium, Chicago, Illinois

February 7, 1991

Recap

Chicago Bulls 95, Detroit Pistons 93

The Palace of Auburn Hills, Auburn Hills, Michigan

April 12, 1991

Recap

Chicago Bulls 91, Detroit Pistons 95

The Palace of Auburn Hills, Auburn Hills, Michigan

April 21, 1991

Recap

Detroit Pistons 100, Chicago Bulls 108

Chicago Stadium, Chicago, Illinois

This was the fifth playoff meeting between these two teams, with the Pistons winning three of the first four meetings.

Previous playoff series
Detroit leads 3–1 in all-time playoff series

1974

Chicago Bulls 4, Detroit Pistons 3

1974 Western Conference Semifinals

1988

Chicago Bulls 1, Detroit Pistons 4

1988 Eastern Conference Semifinals

1989

Chicago Bulls 2, Detroit Pistons 4

1989 Eastern Conference Finals

1990

Chicago Bulls 3, Detroit Pistons 4

1990 Eastern Conference Finals

=== Western Conference finals ===
==== (1) Portland Trail Blazers vs. (3) Los Angeles Lakers ====
NBC

May 18
3:30 PM

Boxscore

Los Angeles Lakers 111, Portland Trail Blazers 106
Scoring by quarter: 33–27, 22–35, 25–30, 31–14
Pts: James Worthy 28; Rebs: Sam Perkins 15; Asts: Magic Johnson 21	Pts: Clyde Drexler 28; Rebs: Buck Williams 10; Asts: Clyde Drexler 12
LA Lakers lead series, 1–0

Memorial Coliseum, Portland, Oregon
Attendance: 12,884

TNT

May 21
10:30 PM

Boxscore

Los Angeles Lakers 98, Portland Trail Blazers 109
Scoring by quarter: 23–32, 29–24, 25–25, 21–28
Pts: James Worthy 21; Rebs: Sam Perkins 10; Asts: Magic Johnson 12	Pts: Terry Porter 26; Rebs: Buck Williams 11; Asts: Terry Porter 8
Series tied, 1–1

Memorial Coliseum, Portland, Oregon
Attendance: 12,884
Referees: Dick Bavetta, Joe Crawford, Paul Mihalak

TNT

May 24
10:00 PM

Boxscore

Portland Trail Blazers 92, Los Angeles Lakers 106
Scoring by quarter: 22–27, 18–16, 19–27, 33–36
Pts: Jerome Kersey 19; Rebs: Buck Williams 11; Asts: Terry Porter 7	Pts: James Worthy 25; Rebs: Perkins, Green 9 each Asts: Magic Johnson 19
LA Lakers lead series, 2–1

Great Western Forum, Inglewood, California
Attendance: 17,505
Referees: Joe Forte, Hue Hollins, Mike Mathis

NBC

May 26
3:30 PM

Boxscore

Portland Trail Blazers 95, Los Angeles Lakers 116
Scoring by quarter: 23–32, 19–30, 29–31, 24–23
Pts: Jerome Kersey 25; Rebs: Drexler, Williams 8 each Asts: Terry Porter 10	Pts: Magic Johnson 22; Rebs: Magic Johnson 9 Asts: Magic Johnson 9
LA Lakers lead series, 3–1

Great Western Forum, Inglewood, California
Attendance: 17,505

NBC

May 28
9:00 PM

Boxscore

Los Angeles Lakers 84, Portland Trail Blazers 95
Scoring by quarter: 25–23, 25–24, 18–28, 16–20
Pts: Magic Johnson 29; Rebs: A.C. Green 9 Asts: Magic Johnson 7	Pts: Jerome Kersey 20; Rebs: Buck Williams 16; Asts: Clyde Drexler 7
LA Lakers lead series, 3–2

Memorial Coliseum, Portland, Oregon
Attendance: 12,884
Referees: Jess Kersey, Jack Nies, Jake O'Donnell

NBC

May 30
9:00 PM

Boxscore

Portland Trail Blazers 90, Los Angeles Lakers 91
Scoring by quarter: 17–28, 26–22, 22–20, 25–21
Pts: Terry Porter 24; Rebs: Clyde Drexler 8 Asts: Clyde Drexler 6	Pts: Sam Perkins 26; Rebs: Magic Johnson 11; Asts: Magic Johnson 8
LA Lakers win series, 4–2

Great Western Forum, Inglewood, California
Attendance: 17,505
Referees: Dick Bavetta, Darell Garretson, Ed T. Rush

Regular-season series
Portland won 3–2 in the regular-season series

November 6, 1990

Recap

Portland Trail Blazers 125, Los Angeles Lakers 123 (OT)

Great Western Forum, Inglewood, California

January 3, 1991

Recap

Los Angeles Lakers 108, Portland Trail Blazers 104

Memorial Coliseum, Portland, Oregon

February 17, 1991

Recap

Portland Trail Blazers 96, Los Angeles Lakers 106

Great Western Forum, Inglewood, California

March 29, 1991

Recap

Portland Trail Blazers 109, Los Angeles Lakers 105 (OT)

Great Western Forum, Inglewood, California

April 13, 1991

Recap

Los Angeles Lakers 113, Portland Trail Blazers 118

Memorial Coliseum, Portland, Oregon

This was the fifth playoff meeting between these two teams, with the Lakers winning three of the first four meetings.

Previous playoff series
Los Angeles leads 3–1 in all-time playoff series

1977

Los Angeles Lakers 0, Portland Trail Blazers 4

1977 Western Conference Finals

1983

Los Angeles Lakers 4, Portland Trail Blazers 1

1983 Western Conference Semifinals

1985

Los Angeles Lakers 4, Portland Trail Blazers 1

1985 Western Conference Semifinals

1989

Los Angeles Lakers 3, Portland Trail Blazers 0

1989 Western Conference First Round

== NBA Finals: (E1) Chicago Bulls vs. (W3) Los Angeles Lakers ==
June 2

Boxscore

Los Angeles Lakers 93, Chicago Bulls 91
Scoring by quarter: 29–30, 22–23, 24–15, 18–23
Pts: Perkins, Worthy 22 each Rebs: Vlade Divac 14; Asts: Magic Johnson 11	Pts: Michael Jordan 36; Rebs: Horace Grant 10; Asts: Michael Jordan 12
LA Lakers lead series, 1–0

Chicago Stadium, Chicago, Illinois
Attendance: 18,676
Referees: Hugh Evans, Jack Madden, Hue Hollins

- Sam Perkins hits the game-winning 3 with 14 seconds left.

June 5

Boxscore

Los Angeles Lakers 86, Chicago Bulls 107
Scoring by quarter: 23–28, 20–20, 26–38, 17–21
Pts: James Worthy 24; Rebs: Green, Johnson 7 each Asts: Magic Johnson 10	Pts: Michael Jordan 33; Rebs: Jordan, Perdue 7 each Asts: Michael Jordan 13
Series tied, 1–1

Chicago Stadium, Chicago, Illinois
Attendance: 18,676
Referees: Jake O'Donnell, Jess Kersey, Mike Mathis

- Michael Jordan does "The Move".

June 7

Boxscore

Chicago Bulls 104, Los Angeles Lakers 96 (OT)
Scoring by quarter: 25–25, 23–22, 18–25, 26–20, Overtime: 12–4
Pts: Michael Jordan 29; Rebs: Scottie Pippen 13; Asts: Michael Jordan 9	Pts: Sam Perkins 25; Rebs: Sam Perkins 9 Asts: Magic Johnson 10
Chicago leads series, 2–1

Great Western Forum, Inglewood, California
Attendance: 17,506
Referees: Darell Garretson, Joey Crawford, Bill Oakes

- Michael Jordan hits the game-tying shot with 3.4 seconds left to force OT.

June 9

Boxscore

Chicago Bulls 97, Los Angeles Lakers 82
Scoring by quarter: 27–28, 25–16, 22–14, 23–24
Pts: Michael Jordan 28; Rebs: Scottie Pippen 9 Asts: Michael Jordan 13	Pts: Vlade Divac 27; Rebs: Vlade Divac 11; Asts: Magic Johnson 11
Chicago leads series, 3–1

Great Western Forum, Inglewood, California
Attendance: 17,506
Referees: Dick Bavetta, Hugh Evans, Ed T. Rush

June 12

Boxscore

Chicago Bulls 108, Los Angeles Lakers 101
Scoring by quarter: 27–25, 21–24, 32–31, 28–21
Pts: Scottie Pippen 32; Rebs: Scottie Pippen 13; Asts: Michael Jordan 10	Pts: Sam Perkins 22; Rebs: Magic Johnson 11; Asts: Magic Johnson 20
Chicago wins series, 4–1

Great Western Forum, Inglewood, California
Attendance: 17,506
Referees: Jake O'Donnell, Jack Madden, Mike Mathis

Regular-season series
Tied 1–1 in the regular-season series

December 21, 1990

Recap

Los Angeles Lakers 103, Chicago Bulls 114

Chicago Stadium, Chicago, Illinois

February 3, 1991

Recap

Chicago Bulls 86, Los Angeles Lakers 99

Great Western Forum, Inglewood, California

This was the fifth playoff meeting between these two teams, with the Lakers winning the first four meetings.

Previous playoff series
Los Angeles leads 4–0 in all-time playoff series

1968

Chicago Bulls 1, Los Angeles Lakers 4

1968 Western Division Semifinals

1971

Chicago Bulls 3, Los Angeles Lakers 4

1971 Western Conference Semifinals

1972

Chicago Bulls 0, Los Angeles Lakers 4

1972 Western Conference Semifinals

1973

Chicago Bulls 3, Los Angeles Lakers 4

1973 Western Conference Semifinals

== Statistical leaders ==
Category	Game high			Average			
Category	Player	Team	High	Player	Team	Avg.	GP
Points	Michael Jordan	Chicago Bulls	46	Michael Jordan	Chicago Bulls	31.1	17
Rebounds	Karl Malone	Utah Jazz	21	Hakeem Olajuwon	Houston Rockets	14.7	3
Assists	Magic Johnson	Los Angeles Lakers	21	John Stockton	Utah Jazz	13.8	9
Steals	Tim Hardaway	Golden State Warriors	8	Tim Hardaway	Golden State Warriors	3.1	9
Blocks	David Robinson	San Antonio Spurs	8	David Robinson	San Antonio Spurs	3.8	4
