= 1990–91 New Jersey Nets season =

Nets' 24th season in the National Basketball Association

- Head coach: Bill Fitch
- Arena: Brendan Byrne Arena

Results
- Record: 26–56 (.317)
- Place: Division: 5th (Atlantic); Conference: 12th (Eastern)
- Playoff finish: Did not qualify
- Stats at Basketball Reference

Local media
- Television: WWOR-TV; SportsChannel New York
- Radio: WNEW

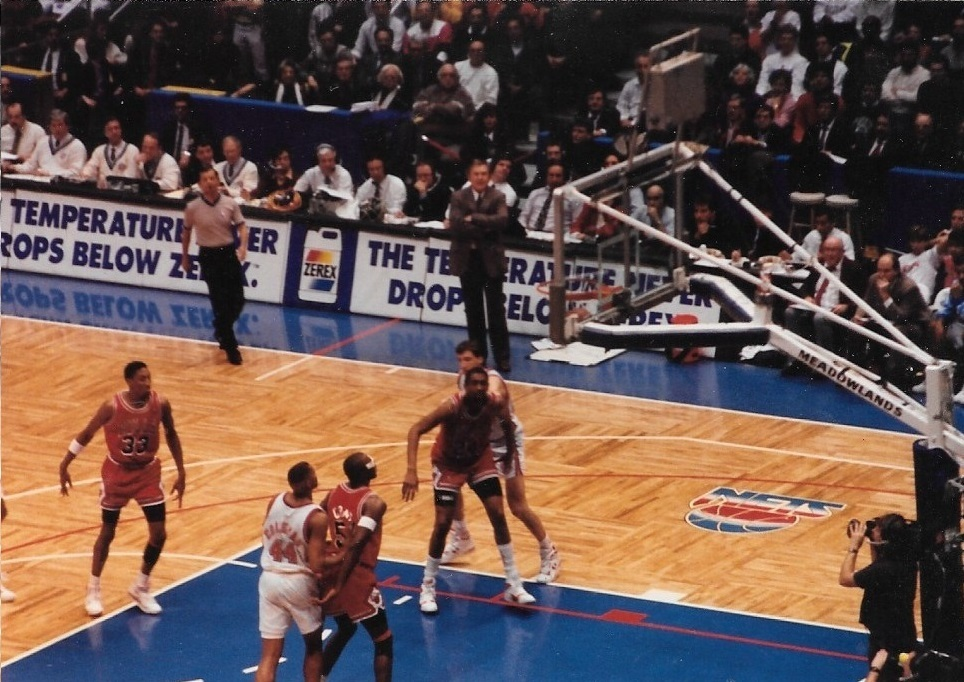
A regular season game between the Nets and the Chicago Bulls at the Brendan Byrne Arena on March 28, 1991

The 1990–91 New Jersey Nets season was the Nets' 24th season in the National Basketball Association, and 15th season in East Rutherford, New Jersey.

== Season summary ==
=== Off-season ===
After finishing with a league-worst 17–65 record the previous season, the Nets won the NBA draft lottery, and selected power forward Derrick Coleman out of Syracuse University with the first overall pick in the 1990 NBA draft. During the off-season, the team acquired Reggie Theus from the Orlando Magic.

For the season, the Nets redesigned their primary logo, which featured the team name "Nets" above a basketball in red, white and blue colors. The team also redesigned their home and road uniforms, adding red side panels to their jerseys and shorts. The white home uniforms featured a red and blue trim, while the road uniforms were changed from blue to a light blue-to-white gradient with a red and white trim; the road uniforms would also be known as the "tie-dye" jerseys.

The team's new primary logo, and new home uniforms would both remain in use until 1997, while the new road uniforms only lasted for just one season, where they would change them to a royal blue color the following season.

=== Regular season ===
With the addition of Coleman and Theus, the Nets continued to struggle losing nine of their first eleven games of the regular season, but managed to win six of their next eight games. However, the team posted an 11-game losing streak between December and January, posted a seven-game losing streak between January and February, and held a 14–34 record at the All-Star break. At mid-season, the Nets acquired second-year Croatian guard Dražen Petrović from the Portland Trail Blazers, and traded Lester Conner to the Milwaukee Bucks in exchange for Greg Anderson. However, after only just one game with the Nets, Anderson was soon traded to the Denver Nuggets in exchange for rookie power forward, and first-round draft pick Terry Mills. The Nets lost 12 of their final 16 games of the season, and finished in fifth place in the Atlantic Division with a 26–56 record; the team missed the NBA playoffs for the fifth consecutive year.

Theus averaged 18.6 points and 4.7 assists per game, while Coleman averaged 18.4 points, 10.3 rebounds and 1.3 blocks per game, and was named the NBA Rookie of the Year, and was also named to the NBA All-Rookie First Team. In addition, second-year guard Mookie Blaylock provided the team with 14.1 points, 6.1 assists and 2.3 steals per game, while Chris Morris contributed 13.2 points, 6.6 rebounds and 1.7 steals per game, and Sam Bowie provided with 12.9 points, 7.7 rebounds and 1.5 blocks per game. Meanwhile, Petrović averaged 12.6 points per game in 43 games after the trade, second-year forward Derrick Gervin contributed 7.6 points per game, Chris Dudley provided with 7.1 points, 8.4 rebounds and 2.5 blocks per game, and Jack Haley averaged 5.6 points and 4.6 rebounds per game.

The Nets finished 24th in the NBA in home-game attendance, with an attendance of 480,786 at the Brendan Byrne Arena during the regular season, which was the fourth-lowest in the league.

=== Aftermath ===
Following the season, Theus retired after only one season with the Nets, and Gervin and Haley were both released to free agency.

== Draft picks ==
Round	Pick	Player	Position	Nationality	College
1	1	Derrick Coleman	PF	United States	Syracuse
1	22	Tate George	SG	United States	Connecticut

== Roster ==
1990–91 New Jersey Nets roster
Players

Pos.	No.	Player	Height	Weight	DOB	From
G	10	Mookie Blaylock	6 ft 0 in (1.83 m)	180 lb (82 kg)	1967-03-20	Oklahoma
C	31	Sam Bowie	7 ft 1 in (2.16 m)	235 lb (107 kg)	1961-03-17	Kentucky
F	35	Jud Buechler	6 ft 6 in (1.98 m)	220 lb (100 kg)	1968-06-19	Arizona
F	44	Derrick Coleman	6 ft 10 in (2.08 m)	230 lb (104 kg)	1967-06-21	Syracuse
C	22	Chris Dudley	6 ft 11 in (2.11 m)	235 lb (107 kg)	1965-02-22	Yale
G	12	Tate George	6 ft 5 in (1.96 m)	190 lb (86 kg)	1968-05-29	Connecticut
F	30	Derrick Gervin	6 ft 8 in (2.03 m)	200 lb (91 kg)	1963-03-28	Texas–San Antonio
F/C	54	Jack Haley	6 ft 10 in (2.08 m)	240 lb (109 kg)	1964-01-27	UCLA
F	6	Roy Hinson	6 ft 9 in (2.06 m)	210 lb (95 kg)	1961-05-02	Rutgers
F	5	Terry Mills	6 ft 10 in (2.08 m)	230 lb (104 kg)	1967-12-21	Michigan
F	34	Chris Morris	6 ft 8 in (2.03 m)	210 lb (95 kg)	1966-01-20	Auburn
G	3	Dražen Petrović	6 ft 5 in (1.96 m)	195 lb (88 kg)	1964-10-22	SFR Yugoslavia
G	24	Reggie Theus	6 ft 7 in (2.01 m)	190 lb (86 kg)	1957-10-13	UNLV

Coaches
Head coach
- Bill Fitch
Assistant(s)
- Rick Carlisle
- Tom Newell

Legend
- (DP) Unsigned draft pick
- (FA) Free agent
- (S) Suspended
- Injured

== Regular season ==
=== Season standings ===
Atlantic Division	W	L	PCT	GB	Home	Road	Div
y-Boston Celtics	56	26	.683	—	35–6	21–20	20-6
x-Philadelphia 76ers	44	38	.537	12	29-12	15-26	14-12
x-New York Knicks	39	43	.476	17	21-20	18-23	17–9
Washington Bullets	30	52	.366	26	21-20	9-32	10-16
New Jersey Nets	26	56	.317	30	20-21	6–35	8-18
Miami Heat	24	58	.293	32	18-23	6-35	9-17

y – clinched division title
x – clinched playoff spot

#	Eastern Conference				
#	Team	W	L	PCT	GB
1	c-Chicago Bulls	61	21	.744	–
2	y-Boston Celtics	56	26	.683	5
3	x-Detroit Pistons	50	32	.610	11
4	x-Milwaukee Bucks	48	34	.585	13
5	x-Philadelphia 76ers	44	38	.537	17
6	x-Atlanta Hawks	43	39	.524	18
7	x-Indiana Pacers	41	41	.500	20
8	x-New York Knicks	39	43	.476	22
9	Cleveland Cavaliers	33	49	.402	28
10	Washington Bullets	30	52	.366	31
11	New Jersey Nets	26	56	.317	35
12	Charlotte Hornets	26	56	.317	35
13	Miami Heat	24	58	.293	37

z – clinched division title
y – clinched division title
x – clinched playoff spot

=== Schedule ===
Game	Date	Opponent	Result	High Ponts	High Rebounds	High Assists	Arena	Record
1	November 2	@ Indiana	L 81–100					0–1
2	November 3	@ Philadelphia	L 110–112					0–2
3	November 6	@ Charlotte	L 105–113					0–3
4	November 8	Miami	W 114–103					1–3
5	November 10	Boston	L 91–105					1–4
6	November 12	Washington	L 92–97					1–5
7	November 14	Milwaukee	W 112–95					2–5
8	November 16	Detroit	L 96–105					2–6
9	November 17	@ Milwaukee	L 99–111					2–7
10	November 20	@ Seattle	L 88–105					2–8
11	November 21	@ L.A. Clippers	L 90–99					2–9
12	November 23	@ Phoenix	W 116–114					3–9
13	November 24	@ Golden State	W 117–113					4–9
14	November 27	Philadelphia	W 98–92					5–9
15	November 28	@ Miami	L 79–97					5–10
16	December 1	Orlando	W 111–92					6–10
17	December 4	Seattle	W 106–102					7–10
18	December 7	Phoenix	L 110–129					7–11
19	December 10	Charlotte	W 121–115					8–11
20	December 13	@ Atlanta	L 97–106					8–12
21	December 15	New York	L 104–125					8–13
22	December 17	Utah	L 98–100					8–14
23	December 19	L.A. Clippers	W 118–105					9–14
24	December 21	Cleveland	W 111–103					10–14
25	December 22	@ New York	L 93–106					10–15
26	December 26	Atlanta	L 111–113					10–16
27	December 28	Houston	L 99–101					10–17
28	December 29	@ Indiana	L 105–114					10–18
29	January 4	San Antonio	L 89–93					10–19
30	January 5	@ Detroit	L 83–99					10–20
31	January 7	Dallas	L 87–88 (OT)					10–21
32	January 8	@ Chicago	L 102–111					10–22
33	January 12	@ Philadelphia	L 99–109					10–23
34	January 13	Portland	L 103–116					10–24
35	January 15	Golden State	L 111–112 (OT)					10–25
36	January 18	@ Boston	W 111–106					11–25
37	January 19	@ Atlanta	L 84–114					11–26
38	January 22	@ Charlotte	W 92–90					12–26
39	January 23	Chicago	W 99–95					13–26
40	January 25	L.A. Lakers	L 103–108					13–27
41	January 26	@ Miami	W 127–105					14–27
42	January 28	@ Sacramento	L 83–101					14–28
43	January 29	@ L.A. Lakers	L 89–110					14–29
44	January 31	@ Denver	L 119–123					14–30
45	February 2	@ Utah	L 103–111					14–31
46	February 4	@ Portland	L 102–117					14–32
47	February 6	Miami	L 119–134					14–33
48	February 7	@ Washington	L 117–124					14–34
49	February 13	Atlanta	W 140–106					15–34
50	February 15	Denver	W 138–110					16–34
51	February 16	@ Chicago	L 87–99					16–35
52	February 19	Sacramento	W 97–83					17–35
53	February 22	@ Boston	L 99–111					17–36
54	February 23	Philadelphia	L 90–103					17–37
55	February 26	Indiana	W 129–104					18–37
56	February 28	Milwaukee	W 98–93					19–37
57	March 2	New York	L 105–115					19–38
58	March 4	@ Dallas	L 100–102					19–39
59	March 5	@ Houston	L 100–112					19–40
60	March 7	@ San Antonio	L 99–111					19–41
61	March 10	@ Miami	L 88–101					19–42
62	March 11	@ New York	L 85–90					19–43
63	March 14	Detroit	W 118–110					20–43
64	March 16	Washington	W 110–86					21–43
65	March 17	Charlotte	L 108–121					21–44
66	March 20	Minnesota	W 118–111 (OT)					22–44
67	March 22	@ Detroit	L 93–109					22–45
68	March 23	@ Cleveland	L 82–108					22–46
69	March 25	@ Washington	L 106–113					22–47
70	March 26	Philadelphia	W 98–95 (OT)					23–47
71	March 28	Chicago	L 94–128					23–48
72	March 30	New York	L 117–130					23–49
73	April 2	Boston	L 77–94					23–50
74	April 4	@ Boston	L 104–123					23–51
75	April 6	@ Milwaukee	L 114–133					23–52
76	April 9	@ Minnesota	L 89–109					23–53
77	April 12	Cleveland	W 104–103					24–53
78	April 13	@ Cleveland	L 98–102					24–54
79	April 16	Indiana	L 126–132					24–55
80	April 18	@ Washington	W 108–103					25–55
81	April 20	Miami	W 118–103					26–55
82	April 21	@ Orlando	L 110–120					26–56

Schedule and Results Citation:

== Player statistics ==
Legend
GP	Games played	GS	Games started	MPG	Minutes per game
FG%	Field-goal percentage	3P%	3-point field-goal percentage	FT%	Free-throw percentage
RPG	Rebounds per game	APG	Assists per game	SPG	Steals per game
BPG	Blocks per game	PPG	Points per game

=== Regular season ===
Player	GP	GS	MPG	FG%	3P%	FT%	RPG	APG	SPG	BPG	PPG
Reggie Theus	81	81	36.5	.468	.361	.851	2.8	4.7	1.0	0.4	18.6
Derrick Coleman	74	68	35.2	.467	.342	.731	10.3	2.2	1.0	1.3	18.4
Mookie Blaylock	72	70	35.9	.416	.154	.790	3.5	6.1	2.3	0.6	14.1
Chris Morris	79	68	32.3	.425	.251	.734	6.6	2.8	1.7	1.2	13.2
Sam Bowie	62	51	30.9	.434	.182	.732	7.7	2.4	0.7	1.5	12.9
Dražen Petrović	43	0	20.5	.500	.373	.861	2.1	1.5	0.9	0.0	12.6
Greg Anderson	1	0	18.0	1.000			6.0	1.0	2.0	0.0	8.0
Derrick Gervin	56	4	13.3	.416	.250	.789	2.0	0.5	0.3	0.3	7.6
Chris Dudley	61	25	25.6	.408		.534	8.4	0.6	0.6	2.5	7.1
Jack Haley	78	18	15.1	.469		.619	4.6	0.4	0.3	0.3	5.6
Terry Mills	38	2	14.2	.464	.000	.705	3.7	0.4	0.5	0.5	4.9
Roy Hinson	9	0	10.1	.513		.333	2.1	0.4	0.0	0.3	4.6
Lester Conner	35	2	14.0	.523	.000	.690	1.6	1.7	1.1	0.0	4.1
Tate George	56	11	10.6	.415	.000	.800	0.8	1.9	0.4	0.1	3.4
Jud Buechler	74	10	11.6	.416	.250	.652	1.9	0.7	0.4	0.2	3.1
Kurk Lee	48	0	5.5	.268	.200	.893	0.6	0.7	0.2	0.0	1.4

Player statistics citation:

== Awards, Records and Honors ==
- Derrick Coleman, NBA Rookie of the Year Award
- Derrick Coleman, NBA All-Rookie Team 1st Team
