= 1990–91 Houston Rockets season =

- Head coach: Don Chaney
- General manager: Steve Patterson
- Owner: Charlie Thomas
- Arena: The Summit

Results
- Record: 52–30 (.634)
- Place: Division: 3rd (Midwest); Conference: 6th (Western)
- Playoff finish: First round (lost to Lakers 0–3)
- Stats at Basketball Reference

Local media
- Television: KTXH; Home Sports Entertainment
- Radio: KTRH

The 1990–91 Houston Rockets season was the 24th season for the Houston Rockets in the National Basketball Association, and their 20th season in Houston, Texas.

== Season summary ==
=== Off-season ===
During the off-season, the Rockets acquired Kenny Smith from the Atlanta Hawks, and signed free agent David Wood.

=== Regular season ===
With the addition of Kenny Smith, the Rockets got off to an 8–7 start to the regular season. The team continued to play around .500 in winning percentage, as Hakeem Olajuwon missed 25 games due to a bone fracture in his right eye. However, the Rockets held a 27–21 record at the All-Star break, and posted a 14–1 record in March, which included a 13-game winning streak. The Rockets finished in third place in the Midwest Division with a 52–30 record, and earned the sixth seed in the Western Conference; the team qualified for the NBA playoffs for the seventh consecutive year. Head coach Don Chaney was named the NBA Coach of the Year, after leading the Rockets to an 11-game improvement over the previous season.

Olajuwon averaged 21.2 points, 13.8 rebounds, 2.2 steals and 3.9 blocks per game in 56 games, and was named to the All-NBA Third Team, and to the NBA All-Defensive Second Team. In addition, Kenny Smith averaged 17.7 points, 7.1 assists and 1.4 steals per game, while Otis Thorpe provided the team with 17.5 points and 10.3 rebounds per game, and Vernon Maxwell contributed 17.0 points and 1.5 steals per game, and led the league with 172 three-point field goals. Meanwhile, Buck Johnson provided with 13.6 points per game, while off the bench, Sleepy Floyd played a sixth man role, averaging 12.3 points, 3.9 assists and 1.2 steals per game, Wood contributed 5.3 points per game, and defensive forward Larry Smith averaged 3.3 points and 8.8 rebounds per game.

During the NBA All-Star weekend at the Charlotte Coliseum in Charlotte, North Carolina, Kenny Smith participated in the NBA Slam Dunk Contest for the second consecutive year; due to his eye injury, Olajuwon was not selected for the 1991 NBA All-Star Game. Kenny Smith finished in 17th place in Most Valuable Player voting, while Olajuwon finished in 18th place; Olajuwon also finished tied in fifth place in Defensive Player of the Year voting, while Kenny Smith finished in third place in Most Improved Player voting, with Larry Smith finishing tied in eighth place, and Larry Smith also finished tied in sixth place in Sixth Man of the Year voting.

The Rockets finished 16th in the NBA in home-game attendance, with an attendance of 613,230 at The Summit during the regular season.

=== NBA playoffs ===
In the Western Conference First Round of the 1991 NBA playoffs, and for the second consecutive year, the Rockets faced off against the 3rd–seeded Los Angeles Lakers, who were led by the trio of All-Star guard Magic Johnson, All-Star forward James Worthy, and Byron Scott. The Rockets lost the first two games to the Lakers on the road at the Great Western Forum, before losing Game 3 at home, 94–90 at The Summit, thus losing the series in a three-game sweep; it was the second consecutive year that the Rockets had their season ended by the Lakers.

The Lakers would lose in five games to the Chicago Bulls in the 1991 NBA Finals.

=== Aftermath ===
Following the season, Wood was released to free agency.

== Draft picks ==
Round	Pick	Player	Position	Nationality	College
1	12	Alec Kessler	PF	United States	Georgia

== Roster ==
1990–91 Houston Rockets roster
Players

Pos.	No.	Player	Height	Weight	DOB	From
F	50	Matt Bullard	6 ft 10 in (2.08 m)	215 lb (98 kg)	1967–06–05	Iowa
F	44	Adrian Caldwell	6 ft 8 in (2.03 m)	265 lb (120 kg)	1966–07–04	Lamar
C	5	Dave Feitl	6 ft 11 in (2.11 m)	235 lb (107 kg)	1962–06–08	UTEP
G	21	Sleepy Floyd	6 ft 3 in (1.91 m)	170 lb (77 kg)	1960–03–06	Georgetown
G	32	Dave Jamerson	6 ft 5 in (1.96 m)	190 lb (86 kg)	1967–08–13	Ohio
F	1	Buck Johnson	6 ft 7 in (2.01 m)	190 lb (86 kg)	1964–01–03	Alabama
G	11	Vernon Maxwell	6 ft 4 in (1.93 m)	180 lb (82 kg)	1965–09–12	Florida
C	34	Hakeem Olajuwon	7 ft 0 in (2.13 m)	255 lb (116 kg)	1963–01–21	Houston
G	30	Kenny Smith	6 ft 3 in (1.91 m)	170 lb (77 kg)	1965–03–08	North Carolina
F	13	Larry Smith	6 ft 8 in (2.03 m)	215 lb (98 kg)	1958–01–18	Alcorn State
F	33	Otis Thorpe	6 ft 9 in (2.06 m)	225 lb (102 kg)	1962–08–05	Providence
F	20	Kennard Winchester	6 ft 5 in (1.96 m)	210 lb (95 kg)	1966–09–03	Averett
F	10	David Wood	6 ft 9 in (2.06 m)	227 lb (103 kg)	1964–11–30	Nevada

Coaches
Head coach
- Don Chaney
Assistant(s)
- Carroll Dawson
- John Killilea
- Calvin Murphy
- Rudy Tomjanovich

Legend
- (DP) Unsigned draft pick
- (FA) Free agent
- (S) Suspended
- Injured

Roster
Updated: December 6, 1990

== Regular season ==
=== Season standings ===
Midwest Division	W	L	PCT	GB	Home	Road	Div
y-San Antonio Spurs	55	27	.671	—	33–8	22–19	20–8
x-Utah Jazz	54	28	.659	1	36–5	18–23	21-7
x-Houston Rockets	52	30	.634	3	31-10	21–20	20-8
Orlando Magic	31	51	.378	24	24-17	7–34	13–15
Minnesota Timberwolves	29	53	.354	26	21-20	8-33	9-19
Dallas Mavericks	28	54	.341	27	20-21	8–33	7-21
Denver Nuggets	20	62	.244	35	17-24	3-38	8–20

y – clinched division title
x – clinched playoff spot

#	Western Conference				
#	Team	W	L	PCT	GB
1	z-Portland Trail Blazers	63	19	.768	–
2	y-San Antonio Spurs	55	27	.671	8
3	x-Los Angeles Lakers	58	24	.707	5
4	x-Phoenix Suns	55	27	.671	8
5	x-Utah Jazz	54	28	.659	9
6	x-Houston Rockets	52	30	.634	11
7	x-Golden State Warriors	44	38	.537	19
8	x-Seattle SuperSonics	41	41	.500	22
9	Orlando Magic	31	51	.378	32
10	Los Angeles Clippers	31	51	.378	32
11	Minnesota Timberwolves	29	53	.354	34
12	Dallas Mavericks	28	54	.341	35
13	Sacramento Kings	25	57	.305	38
14	Denver Nuggets	20	62	.244	43

z – clinched division title
y – clinched division title
x – clinched playoff spot

== Game log ==
=== Regular season ===
1990–91 game log
Total: 52–30 (home: 31–10; road: 21–20)
November: 8–7 (home: 6–1; road: 2–6)

Game	Date	Team	Score	High points	High rebounds	High assists	Location Attendance	Record
1	November 2	@ Portland	L 89–90				Memorial Coliseum	0–1
2	November 3	@ Seattle	L 106–108				Seattle Center Coliseum	0–2
3	November 6	Denver	W 145–135				The Summit	1–2
4	November 8	Orlando	W 103–99				The Summit	2–2
5	November 10	@ San Antonio	L 110–111				HemisFair Arena	2–3
6	November 11	Utah	W 110–90				The Summit	3–3
7	November 13	Minnesota	W 90–88				The Summit	4–3
8	November 15	L.A. Lakers	L 103–108 (OT)				The Summit	4–4
9	November 17	Miami	W 117–100				The Summit	5–4
10	November 20	@ New York	W 115–88				Madison Square Garden	6–4
11	November 21	@ Boston	L 95–108				Boston Garden	6–5
12	November 23	@ Indiana	L 111–112				Market Square Arena	6–6
13	November 25	@ Minnesota	W 107–91				Target Center	7–6
14	November 27	L.A. Clippers	W 107–102				The Summit	8–6
15	November 28	@ Utah	L 92–103				Salt Palace	8–7

December: 8–6 (home: 4–3; road: 4–3)

Game	Date	Team	Score	High points	High rebounds	High assists	Location Attendance	Record
16	December 1	Sacramento	W 117–93				The Summit	9–7
17	December 4	Atlanta	L 110–113				The Summit	9–8
18	December 6	Charlotte	W 116–110				The Summit	10–8
19	December 8	@ Dallas	W 113–107				Reunion Arena	11–8
20	December 10	Boston	L 95–107				The Summit	11–9
21	December 12	@ Philadelphia	W 108–100				The Spectrum	12–9
22	December 14	@ Washington	L 93–106				Capital Centre	12–10
23	December 15	@ Charlotte	W 100–97				Charlotte Coliseum	13–10
24	December 18	San Antonio	L 95–96				The Summit	13–11
25	December 20	Orlando	W 128–126 (OT)				The Summit	14–11
26	December 22	Phoenix	W 122–102				The Summit	15–11
27	December 26	@ Orlando	L 103–109				Orlando Arena	15–12
28	December 28	@ New Jersey	W 101–99				Brendan Byrne Arena	16–12
29	December 29	@ Detroit	L 84–99				The Palace of Auburn Hills	16–13

January: 7–8 (home: 6–3; road: 1–5)

Game	Date	Team	Score	High points	High rebounds	High assists	Location Attendance	Record
30	January 3	Chicago	W 114–92				The Summit	17–13
31	January 5	Indiana	W 112–99				The Summit	18–13
32	January 8	Portland	L 97–123				The Summit	18–14
33	January 10	@ Denver	W 156–133				McNichols Sports Arena	19–14
34	January 11	@ Phoenix	L 110–114				Arizona Veterans Memorial Coliseum	19–15
35	January 13	@ L.A. Lakers	L 97–116				Great Western Forum	19–16
36	January 14	@ L.A. Clippers	L 126–130 (OT)				Los Angeles Memorial Sports Arena	19–17
37	January 17	Detroit	L 91–97 (OT)				The Summit	19–18
38	January 19	L.A. Clippers	W 107–96				The Summit	20–18
39	January 21	@ Sacramento	L 94–97				ARCO Arena	20–19
40	January 22	@ Golden State	L 116–123				Oakland–Alameda County Coliseum Arena	20–20
41	January 24	Minnesota	W 118–94				The Summit	21–20
42	January 26	Cleveland	W 103–97				The Summit	22–20
43	January 29	San Antonio	W 91–89				The Summit	23–20
44	January 31	Seattle	L 94–97				The Summit	23–21

February: 9–3 (home: 4–1; road: 5–2)

Game	Date	Team	Score	High points	High rebounds	High assists	Location Attendance	Record
45	February 2	@ San Antonio	W 100–94 (OT)				HemisFair Arena	24–21
46	February 3	Golden State	W 143–135 (2OT)				The Summit	25–21
47	February 6	@ Milwaukee	W 111–109				Bradley Center	26–21
48	February 7	@ Cleveland	W 96–92				Richfield Coliseum	27–21
49	February 12	@ Utah	L 92–113				Salt Palace	27–22
50	February 14	Washington	W 129–117				The Summit	28–22
51	February 16	Phoenix	W 100–91				The Summit	29–22
52	February 19	L.A. Lakers	L 103–112				The Summit	29–23
53	February 21	Milwaukee	W 92–90				The Summit	30–23
54	February 24	@ Minnesota	W 100–91				Target Center	30–24
55	February 26	@ Denver	W 129–99				McNichols Sports Arena	32–23
56	February 28	@ L.A. Clippers	L 80–83				Los Angeles Memorial Sports Arena	32–24

March: 14–1 (home: 8–0; road: 6–1)

Game	Date	Team	Score	High points	High rebounds	High assists	Location Attendance	Record
57	March 3	@ L.A. Lakers	W 104–95				Great Western Forum	33–24
58	March 5	New Jersey	W 112–100				The Summit	34–24
59	March 7	Dallas	W 122–90				The Summit	35–24
60	March 9	Philadelphia	W 97–80				The Summit	36–24
61	March 12	Seattle	W 93–91				The Summit	37–24
62	March 14	Orlando	W 119–95				The Summit	38–24
63	March 15	@ Phoenix	W 135–128				Arizona Veterans Memorial Coliseum	39–24
64	March 17	Golden State	W 123–119				The Summit	40–24
65	March 19	@ Minnesota	W 98–85				Target Center	41–24
66	March 21	Sacramento	W 98–87				The Summit	42–24
67	March 23	New York	W 111–98				The Summit	43–24
68	March 25	@ Chicago	W 100–90				Chicago Stadium	44–24
69	March 28	@ Atlanta	W 112–111				The Omni	45–24
70	March 30	@ Orlando	L 82–114				Orlando Arena	45–25
71	March 31	@ Miami	W 123–103				Miami Arena	46–25

April: 6–5 (home: 3–2; road: 3–3)

Game	Date	Team	Score	High points	High rebounds	High assists	Location Attendance	Record
72	April 3	Dallas	W 102–86				The Summit	47–25
73	April 5	@ Denver	W 126–120				McNichols Sports Arena	48–25
74	April 6	Utah	W 97–88				The Summit	49–25
75	April 9	Portland	L 93–103				The Summit	49–26
76	April 11	@ Golden State	L 99–111				Oakland–Alameda County Coliseum Arena	49–27
77	April 13	@ Sacramento	W 95–94				ARCO Arena	50–27
78	April 15	@ Seattle	W 97–93				Seattle Center Coliseum	51–27
79	April 16	@ Portland	L 96–115				Memorial Coliseum	51–28
80	April 18	San Antonio	L 95–102				The Summit	51–29
81	April 19	@ Dallas	L 107–113				Reunion Arena	51–30
82	April 21	Denver	W 131–125				The Summit	52–30

1990–91 schedule

== Playoffs ==
1991 playoff game log
First Round: 0–3 (home: 0–1; road: 0–2)

Game	Date	Team	Score	High points	High rebounds	High assists	Location Attendance	Series
1	April 25	@ L.A. Lakers	L 92–94	Hakeem Olajuwon (22)	Hakeem Olajuwon (16)	Maxwell, K. Smith (5)	Great Western Forum; 17,505	0–1
2	April 27	@ L.A. Lakers	L 98–109	Vernon Maxwell (31)	Hakeem Olajuwon (11)	Kenny Smith (7)	Great Western Forum; 17,505	0–2
3	April 30	L.A. Lakers	L 90–94	Thorpe, Olajuwon (21)	Hakeem Olajuwon (17)	Kenny Smith (12)	The Summit; 16,611	0–3

1991 schedule

== Player statistics ==
Legend
GP	Games played	GS	Games started	MPG	Minutes per game
FG%	Field-goal percentage	3P%	3-point field-goal percentage	FT%	Free-throw percentage
RPG	Rebounds per game	APG	Assists per game	SPG	Steals per game
BPG	Blocks per game	PPG	Points per game

=== Season ===
Player	GP	GS	MPG	FG%	3FG%	FT%	RPG	APG	SPG	BPG	PPG
Matt Bullard	18	0	3.5	.452	.000	.647	.8	.1	.2	.0	2.2
Adrian Caldwell	42	0	8.2	.422	.000	.412	2.4	.2	.5	.2	1.8
Dave Feitl	52	2	7.2	.371	.000	.750	1.9	.2	.1	.2	2.6
Sleepy Floyd	82	4	22.6	.411	.273	.752	1.9	3.9	1.2	.2	12.3
Dave Jamerson	37	0	5.5	.381	.263	.815	.8	.7	.2	.0	3.1
Buck Johnson	73	70	31.2	.477	.133	.727	4.5	1.9	1.1	.6	13.6
Vernon Maxwell	82	79	35.0	.404	.337	.733	2.9	3.7	1.5	.2	17.0
Hakeem Olajuwon	56	50	36.8	.508	.000	.769	13.8	2.3	2.2	3.9	21.2
Kenny Smith	78	78	34.6	.520	.363	.844	2.1	7.1	1.4	.1	17.7
Larry Smith	81	28	23.7	.487		.240	8.8	1.1	1.0	.3	3.3
Otis Thorpe	82	82	37.1	.556	.429	.696	10.3	2.4	.9	.2	17.5
Kennard Winchester	64	1	9.5	.400	.400	.778	1.0	.4	.3	.2	3.7
David Wood	82	13	17.3	.424	.311	.812	3.0	1.1	.7	.2	5.3
Mike Woodson^{†}	11	3	11.4	.389	.167	.833	1.0	.9	.5	.4	4.8

=== Playoffs ===
Player	GP	GS	MPG	FG%	3FG%	FT%	RPG	APG	SPG	BPG	PPG
Sleepy Floyd	3	0	13.7	.333	.000		.7	2.3	.7	.3	5.3
Dave Jamerson	2	0	10.5	.385	.000	1.000	1.5	2.0	.5	.0	8.0
Buck Johnson	3	3	28.7	.357		1.000	4.7	2.7	.7	.3	8.0
Vernon Maxwell	3	3	37.7	.411	.333	.500	2.7	3.0	.7	.3	18.7
Hakeem Olajuwon	3	3	43.0	.578	.000	.824	14.7	2.0	1.3	2.7	22.0
Kenny Smith	3	3	37.7	.474	.500	.889	2.7	8.0	1.3	.3	15.3
Larry Smith	3	0	19.0	.250	.000	.000	4.3	1.3	.3	.3	.7
Otis Thorpe	3	3	38.7	.579		.500	8.3	2.7	.7	.0	15.7
David Wood	3	0	14.7	.667	1.000	.500	1.7	1.0	1.0	.0	2.3

Player statistics citation:

== Awards and records ==
- Don Chaney, NBA Coach of the Year Award
- Hakeem Olajuwon, All-NBA Third Team
- Hakeem Olajuwon, NBA All-Defensive Second Team

== See also ==
- 1990–91 NBA season
