= 1990–91 Sacramento Kings season =

NBA professional basketball team season

- Head coach: Dick Motta
- Owners: Joseph Benvenuti; Gregg Lukenbill
- Arena: ARCO Arena

Results
- Record: 25–57 (.305)
- Place: Division: 7th (Pacific); Conference: 13th (Western)
- Playoff finish: Did not qualify
- Stats at Basketball Reference

Local media
- Television: KRBK; SportsChannel Bay Area
- Radio: KFBK

The 1990–91 Sacramento Kings season was the 42nd season for the Sacramento Kings in the National Basketball Association, and their sixth season in Sacramento, California.

== Season summary ==
=== Off-season ===
In the 1990 NBA draft, the Kings became the first team in NBA history to receive four first-round draft picks; the team selected small forward Lionel Simmons out of La Salle University with the seventh overall pick, selected point guard Travis Mays from the University of Texas with the 14th overall pick, selected center Duane Causwell out of Temple University with the 18th overall pick, and selected power forward Anthony Bonner out of Saint Louis University with the 23rd overall pick. During the off-season, the Kings acquired Rory Sparrow from the Miami Heat on draft day, acquired Bob Hansen and Eric Leckner from the Utah Jazz in a three-team trade, and acquired Bill Wennington from the Dallas Mavericks.

For the season, the Kings redesigned their home and road uniforms; removing the side panels from their home jerseys and shorts, and adding their primary logo to the left leg of their shorts for both uniforms. The white home uniforms featured a white and blue trim, while the road uniforms were changed from light blue to royal blue, and featured a blue and white trim. The team's new uniforms would remain in use until 1994.

=== Regular season ===
With the addition of Simmons, Mays and Sparrow, the Kings continued to struggle as the team lost their first seven games of the regular season, on their way to an awful 1–13 start to the season, after a six-game losing streak between November and December. In late December, the team signed free agent Jim Les, and later on traded Leckner to the Charlotte Hornets at mid-season. The Kings held a 13–32 record at the All-Star break, then posted a nine-game losing streak between February and March, and finished in last place in the Pacific Division with a 25–57 record; the team also finished with the worst road record in NBA history at 1–40, while posting a 24–17 home record at the ARCO Arena II, and a record-breaking 37 road-game losing streak during the regular season. The team also missed the NBA playoffs for the fifth consecutive year.

Antoine Carr averaged 20.1 points, 5.5 rebounds and 1.3 blocks per game, while Wayman Tisdale averaged 20.0 points and 7.7 rebounds per game, but only played just 33 games due to a right foot injury, and Simmons provided the team with 18.0 points, 8.8 rebounds, 4.0 assists and 1.4 steals per game, and was named to the NBA All-Rookie First Team. In addition, Mays contributed 14.3 points, 4.0 assists and 1.3 steals per game, and was named to the NBA All-Rookie Second Team, while Sparrow provided with 10.4 points and 4.5 assists per game, Bonner averaged 7.4 points and 4.7 rebounds per game, but only appeared in just 34 games due to injury, and Les contributed 7.2 points and 5.4 assists per game, and shot .461 in three-point field-goal percentage. Meanwhile, Causwell averaged 6.9 points, 5.1 rebounds and 1.9 blocks per game, Hansen contributed 6.4 points per game in 36 games, and Wennington provided with 5.7 points and 4.4 rebounds per game.

Simmons finished in second place in Rookie of the Year voting, behind Derrick Coleman of the New Jersey Nets. The Kings finished fifth in the NBA in home-game attendance, with an attendance of 697,604 at the ARCO Arena II during the regular season.

=== Aftermath ===
Following the season, Carr was traded to the San Antonio Spurs, while Mays was traded to the Atlanta Hawks, and Ralph Sampson was released to free agency.

== Draft picks ==
Round	Pick	Player	Position	Nationality	College
1	7	Lionel Simmons	SF	United States	La Salle
1	14	Travis Mays	PG	United States	Texas
1	18	Duane Causwell	C	United States	Temple
1	23	Anthony Bonner	PF	United States	St. Louis
2	40	Bimbo Coles	PG	United States	Virginia Tech

== Roster ==
1990–91 Sacramento Kings roster
Players

Pos.	No.	Player	Height	Weight	DOB	From
F	24	Anthony Bonner	6 ft 8 in (2.03 m)	215 lb (98 kg)	––	Saint Louis
F	4	Rick Calloway	6 ft 6 in (1.98 m)	180 lb (82 kg)	––	Kansas
F/C	35	Antoine Carr	6 ft 9 in (2.06 m)	225 lb (102 kg)	––	Wichita State
C	31	Duane Causwell	7 ft 0 in (2.13 m)	240 lb (109 kg)	––	Temple
G	21	Steve Colter	6 ft 3 in (1.91 m)	165 lb (75 kg)	––	New Mexico State
F	41	Anthony Frederick	6 ft 7 in (2.01 m)	205 lb (93 kg)	––	Pepperdine
G	20	Bob Hansen	6 ft 6 in (1.98 m)	190 lb (86 kg)	––	Iowa
G	33	Jim Les	5 ft 11 in (1.80 m)	165 lb (75 kg)	––	Bradley
G	1	Travis Mays	6 ft 2 in (1.88 m)	190 lb (86 kg)	––	Texas
C	50	Ralph Sampson	7 ft 4 in (2.24 m)	228 lb (103 kg)	––	Virginia
F	22	Lionel Simmons	6 ft 7 in (2.01 m)	210 lb (95 kg)	––	La Salle
G	2	Rory Sparrow	6 ft 2 in (1.88 m)	175 lb (79 kg)	––	Villanova
F/C	23	Wayman Tisdale	6 ft 9 in (2.06 m)	240 lb (109 kg)	––	Oklahoma
C	34	Bill Wennington	7 ft 0 in (2.13 m)	245 lb (111 kg)	––	St. John's

Coaches
Head coach
- Dick Motta
Assistant(s)
- Bill Berry
- Rex Hughes

Legend
- (DP) Unsigned draft pick
- (FA) Free agent
- (S) Suspended
- Injured

== Regular season ==
=== Season standings ===
Pacific Division	W	L	PCT	GB	Home	Road	Div
y-Portland Trail Blazers	63	19	.768	—	36–5	27–14	18-10
x-Los Angeles Lakers	58	24	.707	5	33–8	25-16	19-9
x-Phoenix Suns	55	27	.671	8	32–9	23-18	17–11
x-Golden State Warriors	44	38	.537	19	30–11	14–27	13–15
x-Seattle SuperSonics	41	41	.500	22	28-13	13–28	12-16
Los Angeles Clippers	31	51	.378	32	23–18	8-33	10-18
Sacramento Kings	25	57	.305	38	24-17	1–40	9–19

y - clinched division title
x - clinched playoff spot

#	Western Conference				
#	Team	W	L	PCT	GB
1	z-Portland Trail Blazers	63	19	.768	–
2	y-San Antonio Spurs	55	27	.671	8
3	x-Los Angeles Lakers	58	24	.707	5
4	x-Phoenix Suns	55	27	.671	8
5	x-Utah Jazz	54	28	.659	9
6	x-Houston Rockets	52	30	.634	11
7	x-Golden State Warriors	44	38	.537	19
8	x-Seattle SuperSonics	41	41	.500	22
9	Orlando Magic	31	51	.378	32
10	Los Angeles Clippers	31	51	.378	32
11	Minnesota Timberwolves	29	53	.354	34
12	Dallas Mavericks	28	54	.341	35
13	Sacramento Kings	25	57	.305	38
14	Denver Nuggets	20	62	.244	43

z - clinched division title
y - clinched division title
x - clinched playoff spot

== Player statistics ==
Legend
GP	Games played	GS	Games started	MPG	Minutes per game
FG%	Field-goal percentage	3P%	3-point field-goal percentage	FT%	Free-throw percentage
RPG	Rebounds per game	APG	Assists per game	SPG	Steals per game
BPG	Blocks per game	PPG	Points per game

=== Regular season ===
Player	GP	GS	MPG	FG%	3P%	FT%	RPG	APG	SPG	BPG	PPG
Rory Sparrow	80	74	29.7	.491	.397	.699	2.3	4.5	1.0	.2	10.4
Lionel Simmons	79	79	37.7	.422	.273	.736	8.8	4.0	1.4	1.1	18.0
Antoine Carr	77	48	32.8	.511	.000	.758	5.5	2.5	.6	1.3	20.1
Bill Wennington	77	23	18.9	.436	.200	.787	4.4	.9	.6	.8	5.7
Duane Causwell	76	55	22.6	.508		.636	5.1	.9	.6	1.9	6.9
Travis Mays	64	55	33.5	.406	.365	.770	2.8	4.0	1.3	.2	14.3
Rick Calloway	64	0	10.6	.391	.000	.696	1.2	1.0	.3	.1	3.2
Jim Les	55	8	25.4	.444	.461	.835	2.0	5.4	1.0	.1	7.2
Bob Hansen	36	24	22.5	.375	.275	.500	2.7	2.5	.6	.1	6.4
Anthony Frederick	35	3	13.6	.399		.717	2.4	1.3	.6	.4	5.1
Anthony Bonner	34	6	22.1	.448		.579	4.7	1.4	1.1	.1	7.4
Wayman Tisdale	33	31	33.8	.483	.000	.800	7.7	2.0	.7	.8	20.0
Eric Leckner^{†}	32	0	11.8	.406		.593	2.7	.6	.1	.3	2.9
Ralph Sampson	25	4	13.9	.366	.200	.263	4.4	.7	.4	.7	3.0
Steve Colter	19	0	13.2	.411	.357	.700	1.4	1.9	.6	.1	3.1
Leon Wood	12	0	18.5	.397	.316	.905	1.6	4.1	.4	.0	6.8
Mike Higgins	7	0	8.7	.600		.571	.7	.3	.0	.3	2.3
Tony Dawson	4	0	4.3	.571	1.000		.5	.0	.0	.0	2.3

- ^{†} Denotes player spent time with another team in the season. Stats reflect time with the Kings only.

== Awards and records ==
- Lionel Simmons, NBA All-Rookie Team 1st Team
- Travis Mays, NBA All-Rookie Team 2nd Team
