= Dave Feitl =

American basketball player (born 1962)

Personal information
- Born: June 8, 1962 (age 64) Butler, Pennsylvania, U.S.
- Listed height: 6 ft 11 in (2.11 m)
- Listed weight: 235 lb (107 kg)

Career information
- High school: Santa Rita (Tucson, Arizona)
- College: UTEP (1982–1986)
- NBA draft: 1986: 2nd round, 43rd overall pick
- Drafted by: Houston Rockets
- Playing career: 1986–1996
- Position: Center
- Number: 5, 22, 45

Career history
- 1986–1987: Houston Rockets
- 1987–1988: Golden State Warriors
- 1988–1989: Washington Bullets
- 1989–1990: Arimo Bologna
- 1990–1991: Houston Rockets
- 1991–1992: New Jersey Nets
- 1995–1996: Chicago Rockers

Career highlights
- First-team All-WAC (1986); 2× Second-team All-WAC (1983, 1985)

Career NBA statistics
- Points: 1,192 (4.3 ppg)
- Stats at NBA.com
- Stats at Basketball Reference

Dave Scott Feitl (born June 8, 1962) is a retired American professional basketball player who was selected by the Houston Rockets in the second round (43rd pick overall) of the 1986 NBA draft. A 6'11" center from the University of Texas at El Paso, Feitl played in 5 National Basketball Association (NBA) seasons for four teams. He played for the Rockets, Golden State Warriors, Washington Bullets and New Jersey Nets.

In his NBA career, Feitl played in 275 games and scored a total of 1,192 points. His best year as a professional came during the 1987–88 season as a member of the Warriors, appearing in 70 games and averaging 6.5 ppg.

== Career statistics ==
Legend
| GP | Games played | GS | Games started | MPG | Minutes per game |
| FG% | Field goal percentage | 3P% | 3-point field goal percentage | FT% | Free throw percentage |
| RPG | Rebounds per game | APG | Assists per game | SPG | Steals per game |
| BPG | Blocks per game | PPG | Points per game | **Bold** | Career high |

=== NBA ===
==== Regular season ====
| Year | Team | GP | GS | MPG | FG% | 3P% | FT% | RPG | APG | SPG | BPG | PPG |
|---|---|---|---|---|---|---|---|---|---|---|---|---|
| 1986–87 | Houston | 62 | 1 | 8.0 | .436 | .000 | .746 | 1.9 | .4 | .1 | .1 | 3.7 |
| 1987–88 | Golden State | **70** | 19 | **16.1** | **.450** | .000 | .701 | **4.8** | **.8** | .2 | .1 | **6.1** |
| 1988–89 | Washington | 57 | **36** | 14.5 | .436 | .000 | .831 | 3.5 | .6 | **.3** | **.3** | 5.0 |
| 1990–91 | Houston | 52 | 2 | 7.2 | .371 | .000 | .750 | 1.9 | .2 | .1 | .2 | 2.6 |
| 1991–92 | New Jersey | 34 | 0 | 5.1 | .429 | – | **.842** | 1.8 | .2 | .1 | .1 | 2.4 |
| Career | | 275 | 58 | 10.9 | .433 | .000 | .751 | 3.0 | .5 | .2 | .2 | 4.3 |

==== Playoffs ====
| Year | Team | GP | GS | MPG | FG% | 3P% | FT% | RPG | APG | SPG | BPG | PPG |
|---|---|---|---|---|---|---|---|---|---|---|---|---|
| 1987 | Houston | **6** | 0 | 1.3 | – | – | **1.000** | .2 | .0 | .0 | .0 | .3 |
| 1992 | New Jersey | 1 | 0 | **3.0** | **.500** | – | – | **1.0** | .0 | .0 | .0 | **2.0** |
| Career | | 7 | 0 | 1.6 | .500 | – | 1.000 | .3 | .0 | .0 | .0 | .6 |
