= 1990–91 Milwaukee Bucks season =

NBA professional basketball team season

- Head coach: Del Harris
- General manager: Del Harris
- Owner: Herb Kohl
- Arena: Bradley Center

Results
- Record: 48–34 (.585)
- Place: Division: 3rd (Central); Conference: 4th (Eastern)
- Playoff finish: First round (lost to 76ers 0–3)
- Stats at Basketball Reference

Local media
- Television: WCGV-TV; Prime Sports Upper Midwest
- Radio: WTMJ

The 1990–91 Milwaukee Bucks season was the 23rd season for the Milwaukee Bucks in the National Basketball Association.

== Season summary ==
=== Off-season ===
During the off-season, the Bucks acquired Frank Brickowski from the San Antonio Spurs, and acquired Danny Schayes from the Denver Nuggets. However, Larry Krystkowiak would miss the entire regular season due to a knee injury.

=== Regular season ===
With the addition of Brickowski and Schayes, the Bucks posted an eight-game winning streak between December and January, which led to a 25–8 start to the regular season. However, the team lost ten of their next twelve games, which included a six-game losing streak in January, and later on held a 30–19 record at the All-Star break. At mid-season, the Bucks traded scoring leader, and sixth man Ricky Pierce to the Seattle SuperSonics in exchange for All-Star guard Dale Ellis. In April, the team signed free agent and former All-Star forward Adrian Dantley, as Ellis suffered a season-ending lower back injury. The Bucks finished in third place in the Central Division with a 48–34 record, and earned the fourth seed in the Eastern Conference. The team also won their first 18 home games of the regular season, posted a 33–8 home record at the Bradley Center, and qualified for the NBA playoffs for the twelfth consecutive year.

Ellis played a sixth man role off the bench, averaging 19.3 points per game in 21 games after the trade, while Jay Humphries averaged 15.2 points, 6.7 assists and 1.6 steals per game, and Alvin Robertson provided the team with 13.6 points, 5.7 rebounds, 5.5 assists and led the league with 3.0 steals per game, and was also named to the NBA All-Defensive First Team. In addition, Brickowski provided with 12.6 points and 5.7 rebounds per game, while Fred Roberts contributed 10.8 points per game, Schayes averaged 10.6 points and 6.5 rebounds per game, and Jack Sikma contributed 10.4 points and 5.7 rebounds per game. Off the bench, Jeff Grayer contributed 6.4 points per game, and Brad Lohaus averaged 5.3 points and 2.7 rebounds per game.

During the NBA All-Star weekend at the Charlotte Coliseum in Charlotte, North Carolina, and before the mid-season trade, Pierce and Robertson were both selected for the 1991 NBA All-Star Game, as members of the Eastern Conference All-Star team; it was Pierce's first and only All-Star appearance, and the fourth and final All-Star appearance for Robertson. Meanwhile, Sikma was selected to participate in the NBA Three-Point Shootout, but withdrew and was replaced with Terry Porter of the Portland Trail Blazers. Robertson also finished in third place in Defensive Player of the Year voting, while head coach Del Harris finished tied in fifth place in Coach of the Year voting.

The Bucks finished eighth in the NBA in home-game attendance, with an attendance of 673,687 at the Bradley Center during the regular season.

=== NBA playoffs ===
In the Eastern Conference First Round of the 1991 NBA playoffs, the Bucks faced off against the 5th–seeded Philadelphia 76ers, a team that featured All-Star forward Charles Barkley, All-Star guard Hersey Hawkins, and Armen Gilliam. After missing the entire regular season due to his knee injury, Krystkowiak returned to play in the team's first-round series against the 76ers; however, without Ellis, the Bucks lost the first two games to the 76ers at home at the Bradley Center, before losing Game 3 on the road, 121–100 at The Spectrum, thus losing the series in a three-game sweep.

This would also be the Bucks' final NBA playoff appearance until the 1998–99 season, as what would follow was a seven-year playoff drought.

=== Aftermath ===
Following the season, Sikma retired.

== Draft picks ==
| Round | Pick | Player | Position | Nationality | College |
|---|---|---|---|---|---|
| 1 | 16 | Terry Mills | PF | United States | Michigan |
| 2 | 44 | Steve Henson | PG | United States | Kansas State |

== Roster ==
1990–91 Milwaukee Bucks roster
Players

| Pos. | No. | Player | Height | Weight | DOB | From |
|---|---|---|---|---|---|---|
| F | 40 | Frank Brickowski | 6 ft 9 in (2.06 m) | 240 lb (109 kg) | 1959–08–14 | Penn State |
| G | 15 | Lester Conner | 6 ft 4 in (1.93 m) | 180 lb (82 kg) | 1959–09–17 | Oregon State |
| F | 7 | Adrian Dantley | 6 ft 5 in (1.96 m) | 208 lb (94 kg) | 1955–02–28 | Notre Dame |
| F | 3 | Dale Ellis (injured) | 6 ft 7 in (2.01 m) | 205 lb (93 kg) | 1960–08–06 | Tennessee |
| G | 20 | Jeff Grayer | 6 ft 5 in (1.96 m) | 200 lb (91 kg) | 1965–12–17 | Iowa State |
| G | 12 | Steve Henson | 5 ft 11 in (1.80 m) | 177 lb (80 kg) | 1968–02–02 | Kansas State |
| G | 24 | Jay Humphries | 6 ft 3 in (1.91 m) | 185 lb (84 kg) | 1962–10–17 | Colorado |
| F | 8 | Frank Kornet | 6 ft 9 in (2.06 m) | 225 lb (102 kg) | 1967–01–27 | Vanderbilt |
| F | 42 | Larry Krystkowiak (injured) (IN) | 6 ft 9 in (2.06 m) | 220 lb (100 kg) | 1964–09–23 | Montana |
| F | 54 | Brad Lohaus | 6 ft 11 in (2.11 m) | 230 lb (104 kg) | 1964–09–29 | Iowa |
| F | 31 | Fred Roberts | 6 ft 10 in (2.08 m) | 218 lb (99 kg) | 1960–08–14 | BYU |
| G | 21 | Alvin Robertson | 6 ft 3 in (1.91 m) | 185 lb (84 kg) | 1962–07–22 | Arkansas |
| C | 10 | Danny Schayes | 6 ft 11 in (2.11 m) | 235 lb (107 kg) | 1959–05–10 | Syracuse |
| C | 43 | Jack Sikma | 6 ft 11 in (2.11 m) | 230 lb (104 kg) | 1955–11–14 | Illinois Wesleyan |
| G | 11 | Everette Stephens | 6 ft 2 in (1.88 m) | 175 lb (79 kg) | 1966–10–21 | Purdue |

Coaches
Head coach
- Del Harris
Assistant(s)
- Mack Calvin
- Frank Hamblen

Legend
- (DP) Unsigned draft pick
- (FA) Free agent
- (S) Suspended
- Injured

=== Roster Notes ===
- Power forward Larry Krystkowiak was on the injured reserve list due to a knee injury, and missed the entire regular season; however, he was activated to play in the NBA playoffs.

== Regular season ==
=== Season standings ===
| Central Division | W | L | PCT | GB | Home | Road | Div |
|---|---|---|---|---|---|---|---|
| y-Chicago Bulls | 61 | 21 | .744 | — | 35–6 | 26–15 | 25–5 |
| x-Detroit Pistons | 50 | 32 | .610 | 11 | 32–9 | 18–23 | 19–11 |
| x-Milwaukee Bucks | 48 | 34 | .585 | 13 | 33–8 | 15–26 | 16–14 |
| x-Atlanta Hawks | 43 | 39 | .524 | 18 | 29–12 | 14–27 | 11–19 |
| x-Indiana Pacers | 41 | 41 | .500 | 20 | 29–12 | 12–29 | 15–15 |
| Cleveland Cavaliers | 33 | 49 | .402 | 28 | 23–18 | 10–31 | 11–19 |
| Charlotte Hornets | 26 | 56 | .317 | 35 | 17–24 | 9–32 | 8–22 |

| # | Eastern Conference | | | | |
| # | Team | W | L | PCT | GB |
|---|---|---|---|---|---|
| 1 | c-Chicago Bulls | 61 | 21 | .744 | – |
| 2 | y-Boston Celtics | 56 | 26 | .683 | 5 |
| 3 | x-Detroit Pistons | 50 | 32 | .610 | 11 |
| 4 | x-Milwaukee Bucks | 48 | 34 | .585 | 13 |
| 5 | x-Philadelphia 76ers | 44 | 38 | .537 | 17 |
| 6 | x-Atlanta Hawks | 43 | 39 | .524 | 18 |
| 7 | x-Indiana Pacers | 41 | 41 | .500 | 20 |
| 8 | x-New York Knicks | 39 | 43 | .476 | 22 |
| 9 | Cleveland Cavaliers | 33 | 49 | .402 | 28 |
| 10 | Washington Bullets | 30 | 52 | .366 | 31 |
| 11 | New Jersey Nets | 26 | 56 | .317 | 35 |
| 12 | Charlotte Hornets | 26 | 56 | .317 | 35 |
| 13 | Miami Heat | 24 | 58 | .293 | 37 |

z - clinched division title
y - clinched division title
x - clinched playoff spot

=== Game log ===
1990–91 game log
Total: 48–34 (home: 0–0; road: 0–0)
November: 2–1 (home: 1–0; road: 1–1)

| Game | Date | Team | Score | High points | High rebounds | High assists | Location Attendance | Record |
|---|---|---|---|---|---|---|---|---|
| 1 | November 2, 1990 | @ Detroit | L 104–115 | | | | The Palace of Auburn Hills; 21,454 | 0–1 |
| 2 | November 3, 1990 | Minnesota | W 111–93 | | | | Bradley Center; 15,102 | 1–1 |
| 3 | November 6, 1990 | @ Miami | W 106–94 | | | | Miami Arena; 15,008 | 2–1 |
| 4 | November 8, 1990 | Philadelphia | W 141–111 | Jay Humphries (25) | Greg Anderson (9) | Alvin Robertson (12) | Bradley Center; 12,476 | 3–1 |
| 5 | November 9, 1990 | @ Washington | W 108–100 | Ricky Pierce (25) | | | Capital Centre; 8,829 | 4–1 |
| 6 | November 13, 1990 | Boston | W 119–91 | | | | Bradley Center; 15,321 | 5–1 |
| 7 | November 14, 1990 | @ New Jersey | L 95–112 | | | | Brendan Byrne Arena; 6,424 | 5–2 |
| 8 | November 16, 1990 | @ Cleveland | L 94–99 | | | | Coliseum at Richfield; 14,430 | 5–3 |
| 9 | November 17, 1990 | New Jersey | W 111–99 | | | | Bradley Center; 14,276 | 6–3 |
| 10 | November 19, 1990 | Utah | W 114–104 | | | | Bradley Center; 13,568 | 7–3 |
| 11 | November 21, 1990 | Atlanta | W 105–93 | | | | Bradley Center; 15,279 | 8–3 |
| 12 | November 24, 1990 | @ New York | W 107–97 | | | | Madison Square Garden; 17,101 | 9–3 |
| 13 | November 27, 1990 | Indiana | W 107–97 | | | | Bradley Center; 13,492 | 10–3 |
| 14 | November 28, 1990 | Charlotte | L 111–118 | | | | Charlotte Coliseum; 23,901 | 10–4 |
| 15 | November 30, 1990 | New York | W 103–97 | | | | Bradley Center; 15,294 | 11–4 |

December: 0–0 (home: 0–0; road: 0–0)

| Game | Date | Team | Score | High points | High rebounds | High assists | Location Attendance | Record |
|---|---|---|---|---|---|---|---|---|
| 16 | December 2, 1990 | @ Indiana | L 103–107 | | | | Market Square Arena; 8,717 | 11–5 |
| 17 | December 4, 1990 | @ Philadelphia | L 108–109 | | | | Spectrum; 10,795 | 11–6 |
| 18 | December 5, 1990 | Cleveland | W 113–109 | | | | Bradley Center; 13,941 | 12–6 |
| 19 | December 7, 1990 | @ Atlanta | W 104–103 | | | | Omni Coliseum; 9,586 | 13–6 |

January: 0–0 (home: 0–0; road: 0–0)

| Game | Date | Team | Score | High points | High rebounds | High assists | Location Attendance | Record |

February: 0–0 (home: 0–0; road: 0–0)

| Game | Date | Team | Score | High points | High rebounds | High assists | Location Attendance | Record |

March: 0–0 (home: 0–0; road: 0–0)

| Game | Date | Team | Score | High points | High rebounds | High assists | Location Attendance | Record |

April: 0–0 (home: 0–0; road: 0–0)

| Game | Date | Team | Score | High points | High rebounds | High assists | Location Attendance | Record |

1990–91 schedule

== Playoffs ==
1991 playoff game log
First Round: 0–3 (home: 0–1; road: 0–2)

| Game | Date | Team | Score | High points | High rebounds | High assists | Location Attendance | Series |
|---|---|---|---|---|---|---|---|---|
| 1 | April 25 | Philadelphia | L 90–99 | Frank Brickowski (22) | Frank Brickowski (9) | Jay Humphries (9) | Bradley Center; 13,587 | 0–1 |
| 2 | April 27 | Philadelphia | L 112–116 (OT) | Alvin Robertson (31) | Frank Brickowski (12) | Jay Humphries (8) | Bradley Center; 15,623 | 0–2 |
| 3 | April 30 | @ Philadelphia | L 100–121 | Alvin Robertson (26) | Robertson, Brickowski (5) | Jay Humphries (8) | Spectrum; 16,239 | 0–3 |

1991 schedule

== Player statistics ==
Legend
| GP | Games played | GS | Games started | MPG | Minutes per game |
| FG% | Field-goal percentage | 3P% | 3-point field-goal percentage | FT% | Free-throw percentage |
| RPG | Rebounds per game | APG | Assists per game | SPG | Steals per game |
| BPG | Blocks per game | PPG | Points per game |

=== Season ===
| Player | GP | GS | MPG | FG% | 3FG% | FT% | RPG | APG | SPG | BPG | PPG |
|---|---|---|---|---|---|---|---|---|---|---|---|
| Ricky Pierce | 46 | 0 | 28.8 | 49.9 | 39.8 | 90.7 | 2.5 | 2.1 | 0.8 | 0.2 | 22.5 |
| Dale Ellis | 21 | 0 | 29.7 | 48.6 | 44.1 | 70.7 | 3.9 | 1.5 | 0.8 | 0.2 | 19.3 |
| Jay Humphries | 80 | 80 | 34.1 | 50.2 | 37.3 | 79.9 | 2.8 | 6.7 | 1.6 | 0.1 | 15.2 |
| Alvin Robertson | 81 | 81 | 32.1 | 48.5 | 36.5 | 75.7 | 5.7 | 5.5 | 3.0 | 0.2 | 13.6 |
| Frank Brickowski | 75 | 73 | 25.5 | 52.7 | 0.0 | 79.8 | 5.7 | 1.7 | 1.1 | 0.6 | 12.6 |
| Fred Roberts | 82 | 82 | 25.8 | 53.3 | 16.0 | 81.3 | 3.4 | 1.6 | 0.8 | 0.4 | 10.8 |
| Danny Schayes | 82 | 38 | 27.2 | 49.9 | 0.0 | 83.5 | 6.5 | 1.2 | 0.7 | 0.7 | 10.6 |
| Jack Sikma | 77 | 44 | 25.2 | 42.7 | 34.1 | 84.3 | 5.7 | 1.9 | 0.8 | 0.8 | 10.4 |
| Jeff Grayer | 82 | 7 | 17.3 | 43.3 | 0.0 | 68.7 | 3.0 | 1.5 | 0.6 | 0.1 | 6.4 |
| Adrian Dantley | 10 | 0 | 12.6 | 38.0 | 33.3 | 69.2 | 1.3 | 0.9 | 0.5 | 0.0 | 5.7 |
| Brad Lohaus | 81 | 3 | 15.0 | 43.1 | 27.7 | 68.5 | 2.7 | 0.9 | 0.6 | 0.9 | 5.3 |
| Steve Henson | 68 | 0 | 10.1 | 41.8 | 33.3 | 90.5 | 0.8 | 1.9 | 0.5 | 0.0 | 3.1 |
| Lester Conner | 39 | 2 | 13.3 | 39.6 | 0.0 | 75.0 | 1.4 | 2.7 | 1.2 | 0.0 | 2.9 |
| Greg Anderson | 26 | 0 | 9.5 | 37.0 | 0.0 | 57.1 | 2.9 | 0.1 | 0.3 | 0.3 | 2.7 |
| Everette Stephens | 3 | 0 | 2.0 | 66.7 | 0.0 | 100.0 | 0.0 | 0.7 | 0.0 | 0.0 | 2.0 |
| Frank Kornet | 32 | 0 | 4.9 | 37.1 | 27.8 | 53.8 | 0.8 | 0.3 | 0.2 | 0.0 | 1.8 |

=== Playoffs ===
| Player | GP | GS | MPG | FG% | 3FG% | FT% | RPG | APG | SPG | BPG | PPG |
|---|---|---|---|---|---|---|---|---|---|---|---|
| Alvin Robertson | 3 | 3 | 39.3 | 59.2 | 33.3 | 76.9 | 6.0 | 5.0 | 2.7 | 0.0 | 23.7 |
| Frank Brickowski | 3 | 3 | 36.7 | 53.3 | 0.0 | 50.0 | 8.7 | 1.0 | 0.3 | 0.7 | 18.3 |
| Jay Humphries | 3 | 3 | 41.0 | 53.1 | 40.0 | 90.0 | 2.0 | 8.3 | 0.7 | 0.0 | 15.0 |
| Fred Roberts | 3 | 3 | 34.3 | 45.7 | 0.0 | 100.0 | 5.0 | 2.3 | 0.7 | 0.3 | 11.3 |
| Danny Schayes | 3 | 3 | 23.7 | 39.1 | 0.0 | 90.9 | 4.0 | 1.0 | 1.0 | 0.3 | 9.3 |
| Steve Henson | 3 | 0 | 13.3 | 50.0 | 66.7 | 75.0 | 1.0 | 1.0 | 0.3 | 0.0 | 5.7 |
| Jeff Grayer | 3 | 0 | 12.3 | 38.5 | 0.0 | 83.3 | 2.0 | 2.0 | 0.3 | 0.0 | 5.0 |
| Jack Sikma | 3 | 0 | 17.0 | 40.0 | 50.0 | 50.0 | 4.0 | 2.0 | 1.7 | 0.3 | 4.7 |
| Brad Lohaus | 3 | 0 | 13.7 | 31.3 | 37.5 | 50.0 | 3.0 | 0.3 | 0.0 | 0.0 | 4.7 |
| Lester Conner | 1 | 0 | 7.0 | 100.0 | 0.0 | 0.0 | 1.0 | 2.0 | 0.0 | 0.0 | 2.0 |
| Adrian Dantley | 3 | 0 | 6.3 | 14.3 | 0.0 | 75.0 | 1.3 | 0.0 | 0.0 | 0.0 | 1.7 |
| Larry Krystkowiak | 3 | 0 | 8.3 | 16.7 | 0.0 | 0.0 | 1.0 | 0.7 | 0.3 | 0.0 | 0.7 |

Player statistics citation:

== Awards and records ==
- Alvin Robertson, NBA All-Defensive First Team

== Transactions ==
=== Trades ===
August 1, 1990
To Milwaukee Bucks----
- Frank Brickowski
To San Antonio Spurs----
- Paul Pressey
August 1, 1990
To Milwaukee Bucks----
- Danny Schayes
To Denver Nuggets----
- Terry Mills
January 16, 1991
To Milwaukee Bucks----
- Lester Conner
To New Jersey Nets----
- Cadillac Anderson
February 15, 1991
To Milwaukee Bucks----
- Dale Ellis
To Seattle SuperSonics----
- Ricky Pierce

=== Free agents ===
| Player | Signed | Former team |
| Adrian Dantley | April 2, 1991 | Dallas Mavericks |

Player Transactions Citation:

== See also ==
- 1990-91 NBA season
