= Buck Johnson (basketball) =

American basketball player (born 1964)

Personal information
- Born: January 3, 1964 (age 62) Birmingham, Alabama, U.S.
- Listed height: 6 ft 7 in (2.01 m)
- Listed weight: 190 lb (86 kg)

Career information
- High school: Hayes (Birmingham, Alabama)
- College: Alabama (1982–1986)
- NBA draft: 1986: 1st round, 20th overall pick
- Drafted by: Houston Rockets
- Playing career: 1986–2006
- Position: Small forward
- Number: 1, 2, 8

Career history
- 1986–1992: Houston Rockets
- 1992–1993: Washington Bullets
- 1993: Wichita Falls Texans
- 1993–1994: Tofaş
- 1994–1995: Hapoel Tel Aviv
- 1995–1996: Apollon Patras
- 1996–1997: Maccabi Tel Aviv
- 1997–1998: Girona
- 1998–2000: Iraklis Thessaloniki
- 2000–2002: Dafni
- 2002: Peristeri
- 2005–2006: Birmingham Magicians

Career highlights
- Spanish League All-Star (1997); 4× Greek League All-Star (1996 I, 1998, 1999, 2001); Israeli League champion (1997); 2× First-team All-SEC (1985, 1986); Second-team Parade All-American (1982); Alabama Mr. Basketball (1982); McDonald's All-American (1982)

Career NBA statistics
- Points: 4,617 (9.1 ppg)
- Rebounds: 1,760 (3.5 rpg)
- Stats at NBA.com
- Stats at Basketball Reference
Medals
Men's basketball
Representing United States
FIBA U19 World Cup
Gold medal – first place	1983 Palma de Mallorca	Under-19

Alfonso "Buck" Johnson Jr. (born January 3, 1964) is an American former professional basketball player. Johnson, a 6'7" small forward, played seven seasons in the National Basketball Association (NBA) for the Houston Rockets and Washington Bullets. After playing in the NBA, he spent his next ten professional seasons playing abroad for various teams, in top leagues around the world.

== High school career ==
Johnson played high school basketball at, and graduated from, Hayes High School in Birmingham, Alabama.

== College career ==
Johnson played college basketball at the University of Alabama, with the Alabama Crimson Tide, from 1982 to 1986.

== Professional career ==
Johnson was drafted by the Houston Rockets in the first round (20th pick overall) of the 1986 NBA draft. Johnson played in seven NBA seasons, from 1986 to 1993. He played for the Rockets from 1986 to 1992, and for the Washington Bullets during the 1992–93 season.

Johnson's best year as a pro came during the 1989–90 season, as a member of the Rockets, when he started all 82 games and averaged 14.8 points per game. In his NBA career, Johnson played in 505 games, and scored a total of 4,617 points (9.1 ppg).

On December 22, 1988, in a game against the Los Angeles Clippers, Johnson took a half-court shot with four seconds left in the third quarter which was successful. One second remained on the clock and the Clippers inbounded the ball to Danny Manning at halfcourt, who took a shot of his own which hit just as the buzzer sounded. Johnson's Houston Rockets team won the game 125-109 as Johnson scored a career-high 24 points. The shot by Manning was his first career successful three-point shot.

== National team career ==
Johnson won a gold medal with Team USA's Under-19 junior national team, at the 1983 FIBA Under-19 World Cup. In eight games played at the tournament, he averaged 15.8 points per game.

== Career statistics ==
Legend
GP	Games played	GS	Games started	MPG	Minutes per game
FG%	Field goal percentage	3P%	3-point field goal percentage	FT%	Free throw percentage
RPG	Rebounds per game	APG	Assists per game	SPG	Steals per game
BPG	Blocks per game	PPG	Points per game	**Bold**	Career high
*	Led the league

=== NBA ===
==== Regular season ====
Year	Team	GP	GS	MPG	FG%	3P%	FT%	RPG	APG	SPG	BPG	PPG
1986–87	Houston	60	3	8.7	.468	.000	.690	1.5	.7	.3	.3	3.8
1987–88	Houston	70	2	12.6	.520	.125	.736	2.4	.7	.4	.4	5.4
1988–89	Houston	67	51	27.6	**.524**	.111	.754	4.3	1.9	1.0	.5	9.6
1989–90	Houston	**82***	**82***	**34.5**	.495	.118	**.759**	**4.6**	**3.1**	**1.3**	**.8**	**14.8**
1990–91	Houston	73	70	31.2	.477	**.133**	.727	4.5	1.9	1.1	.6	13.6
1991–92	Houston	80	69	27.5	.458	.111	.727	3.9	2.0	.9	.6	8.6
1992–93	Washington	73	19	17.6	.479	.000	.730	2.7	1.2	.5	.2	6.5
Career		505	296	23.5	.488	.113	.738	3.5	1.7	.8	.5	9.1

==== Playoffs ====
Year	Team	GP	GS	MPG	FG%	3P%	FT%	RPG	APG	SPG	BPG	PPG
1987	Houston	**5**	0	2.0	.333	–	–	.0	.0	.0	.0	.8
1988	Houston	4	0	5.0	**.667**	–	.500	1.0	.0	.3	.0	1.3
1989	Houston	4	**4**	29.5	.475	.000	.571	3.8	**3.3**	.8	**.5**	11.5
1990	Houston	4	**4**	**37.0**	.417	.000	.846	4.0	2.3	**1.5**	**.5**	**12.8**
1991	Houston	3	3	28.7	.357	–	**1.000**	**4.7**	2.7	.7	.3	8.0
Career		20	11	19.1	.424	.000	.727	2.5	1.5	.6	.3	6.5
