= David Wood (basketball) =

American basketball player (born 1964)

Personal information
- Born: November 30, 1964 (age 61) Spokane, Washington, U.S.
- Listed height: 6 ft 9 in (2.06 m)
- Listed weight: 227 lb (103 kg)

Career information
- High school: Hudson's Bay (Vancouver, Washington)
- College: Skagit Valley (1983–1985); Nevada (1985–1987)
- NBA draft: 1987: undrafted
- Playing career: 1987–2007
- Position: Power forward
- Number: 34, 10, 12, 7

Career history
- 1987–1988: Rockford Lightning
- 1988: Chicago Bulls
- 1988–1989: Rockford Lightning
- 1989: Libertas Livorno
- 1989–1990: FC Barcelona
- 1990–1991: Houston Rockets
- 1991–1992: Saski Baskonia
- 1992–1993: San Antonio Spurs
- 1993–1994: Detroit Pistons
- 1994–1996: Golden State Warriors
- 1996: Phoenix Suns
- 1996: Dallas Mavericks
- 1996–1997: Milwaukee Bucks
- 1997–1998: Rockford Lightning
- 1998: Unicaja Málaga
- 1998–1999: Murcia
- 1999: Limoges CSP
- 2000: Gran Canaria
- 2000–2003: Fuenlabrada
- 2001: Purefoods Tender Juicy Hotdogs
- 2007: Reno Sharpshooters

Career highlights
- CBA All-Star (1989)
- Stats at NBA.com
- Stats at Basketball Reference
Medals
Representing United States
World Championships
Bronze medal – third place	1998 Greece	National team

David Leroy Wood (born November 30, 1964) is an American former professional basketball player, who most notably played in the National Basketball Association (NBA).

His NBA career spanned from 1988 until 1997. He played in the Continental Basketball Association with the Rockford Lightning and the Yakima Sun Kings, and also played professionally in France, Spain, and the Philippines.

He played for the US national team in the 1998 FIBA World Championship, winning the bronze medal.

Following his retirement, Wood became interested in politics. He is a strong supporter of Donald Trump.

His son, Moses, plays basketball professionally.

== Career statistics ==
Legend
GP	Games played	GS	Games started	MPG	Minutes per game
FG%	Field goal percentage	3P%	3-point field goal percentage	FT%	Free throw percentage
RPG	Rebounds per game	APG	Assists per game	SPG	Steals per game
BPG	Blocks per game	PPG	Points per game	**Bold**	Career high
*	Led the league

=== NBA ===
==== Regular season ====
Year	Team	GP	GS	MPG	FG%	3P%	FT%	RPG	APG	SPG	BPG	PPG
1988–89	Chicago	2	0	1.0	.000	.000	.000	0.0	0.0	0.0	0.0	0.0
1990–91	Houston	**82***	**13**	17.3	.424	.311	.812	3.0	**1.1**	**0.7**	**0.2**	5.3
1992–93	San Antonio	64	2	9.3	.444	.238	.836	1.5	0.5	0.2	**0.2**	2.4
1993–94	Detroit	78	3	15.2	.459	**.449**	.756	3.1	0.7	0.5	**0.2**	4.1
1994–95	Golden State	78	**13**	17.1	.469	.341	.778	3.1	0.8	0.4	**0.2**	**5.5**
1995–96	Golden State	21	0	4.6	.500	.333	.875	0.8	0.2	0.1	0.0	1.0
1995–96	Phoenix	4	0	8.5	.167	.000	**1.000**	1.3	0.5	0.3	0.0	1.0
1995–96	Dallas	37	0	**17.4**	.435	.322	.725	**3.6**	0.7	0.4	**0.2**	4.9
1996–97	Milwaukee	46	0	5.2	**.526**	.333	.667	0.6	0.3	0.2	0.1	1.2
Career		412	31	13.5	.449	.338	.785	2.4	0.7	0.4	0.2	3.9

==== Playoffs ====
Year	Team	GP	GS	MPG	FG%	3P%	FT%	RPG	APG	SPG	BPG	PPG
1990–91	Houston	3	0	**14.7**	**.667**	**1.000**	**.500**	**1.7**	**1.0**	**1.0**	0.0	**2.3**
1992–93	San Antonio	**5**	0	4.0	.500	**1.000**	.000	0.6	0.2	0.0	0.0	1.0
Career		8	0	8.0	.571	1.000	.500	1.0	0.5	0.4	0.0	1.5

=== College ===
Year	Team	GP	GS	MPG	FG%	3P%	FT%	RPG	APG	SPG	BPG	PPG
1985–86	Nevada	28	–	28.8	**.516**	**.483**	.662	6.0	**1.5**	0.7	0.3	8.5
1986–87	Nevada	**30**	**30**	**31.7**	.472	.393	**.726**	**9.4**	1.2	**0.8**	**0.8**	**12.1**
Career		58	30	30.3	.488	.416	.702	7.7	1.3	0.7	0.6	10.4
