= 1990–91 Golden State Warriors season =

NBA professional basketball team season

- Head coach: Don Nelson
- General manager: Don Nelson
- Owner: Jim Fitzgerald
- Arena: Oakland-Alameda County Coliseum Arena

Results
- Record: 44–38 (.537)
- Place: Division: 4th (Pacific); Conference: 7th (Western)
- Playoff finish: Conference Semi-finals (lost to Lakers 1–4)
- Stats at Basketball Reference

Local media
- Television: KPIX; KICU; Pacific Sports Network
- Radio: KNBR

The 1990–91 Golden State Warriors season was the 45th season for the Golden State Warriors in the National Basketball Association, and their 28th season in the San Francisco Bay Area.

== Season summary ==
=== Off-season ===
The Warriors received the eleventh overall pick in the 1990 NBA draft, and selected power forward Tyrone Hill out of Xavier University. The trio of Chris Mullin, Mitch Richmond, and second-year star Tim Hardaway were given the name "Run TMC" during the regular season.

=== Regular season ===
In their regular season opener on November 2, 1990, the Warriors defeated the Denver Nuggets on the road, 162–158 at the McNichols Sports Arena; it was the highest-scoring regulation game in NBA history. Despite their scoring prowess, the team was limited defensively. With the addition of Hill, the Warriors got off to a solid start by winning eight of their first eleven games of the season. However, the team later on played around .500 in winning percentage as the season progressed, holding a 26–20 record at the All-Star break. At mid-season, the team signed rookie shooting guard Mario Elie after a brief stint with the Philadelphia 76ers. The Warriors won their final five games of the season, and finished in fourth place in the Pacific Division with a 44–38 record, earning the seventh seed in the Western Conference, and returning to the NBA playoffs after a one-year absence.

Mullin averaged 25.7 points, 5.4 rebounds, 4.0 assists and 2.1 steals per game, and was named to the All-NBA Second Team, while Richmond averaged 23.9 points, 5.9 rebounds and 1.6 steals per game, and Hardaway provided the team with 22.9 points, 9.7 assists and 2.6 steals per game. In addition, second-year guard Sarunas Marciulionis contributed 10.9 points per game off the bench, while sixth man Rod Higgins provided with 9.5 points and 4.3 rebounds per game off the bench, and Tom Tolbert contributed 8.1 points and 4.4 rebounds per game. Meanwhile, Alton Lister averaged 6.4 points, 6.3 rebounds and 1.2 blocks per game, Hill provided with 5.3 points and 5.2 rebounds per game, and Jim Petersen averaged 4.5 points and 3.2 rebounds per game.

During the NBA All-Star weekend at the Charlotte Coliseum in Charlotte, North Carolina, Mullin and Hardaway were both selected for the 1991 NBA All-Star Game, as members of the Western Conference All-Star team; it was Hardaway's first ever All-Star appearance. In addition, Hardaway also participated in the NBA Three-Point Shootout. Despite a stellar season, Richmond was not selected for the NBA All-Star Game. Hardaway finished in fifth place in Most Improved Player voting, and also finished tied in 19th place in Most Valuable Player voting.

The Warriors finished 14th in the NBA in home-game attendance, with an attendance of 616,025 at the Oakland-Alameda County Coliseum Arena during the regular season.

=== NBA playoffs ===
In the Western Conference First Round of the 1991 NBA playoffs, the Warriors faced off against the 2nd–seeded, and Midwest Division champion San Antonio Spurs, who were led by the trio of All-Star center David Robinson, Terry Cummings, and second-year star Sean Elliott. The Warriors lost Game 1 to the Spurs on the road, 130–121 at the HemisFair Arena, but managed to win the next three games, which included a Game 4 win over the Spurs at home, 110–97 at the Oakland-Alameda County Coliseum Arena to win the series in four games. It was the second time in the last three years that the Warriors finished the regular season as the seventh seed, and defeated a second–seeded team in the opening round of the NBA playoffs.

In the Western Conference Semi-finals, the team faced off against the 3rd–seeded Los Angeles Lakers, who were led by the trio of All-Star guard Magic Johnson, All-Star forward James Worthy, and Byron Scott. The Warriors lost Game 1 to the Lakers on the road, 126–116 at the Great Western Forum, but managed to win Game 2 on the road, 125–124 to even the series. However, the Warriors lost the next three games, including a Game 5 loss to the Lakers at the Great Western Forum in overtime, 124–119, thus losing the series in five games.

The Lakers would lose in five games to the Chicago Bulls in the 1991 NBA Finals.

=== Notable highlights ===
On February 26, 1991, the Warriors lost to the Orlando Magic at home, 131–119 at the Oakland-Alameda County Coliseum Arena, despite the "Run TMC" trio each scoring more than 30 points; the rest of the team totaled 21 points.

=== Aftermath ===
Following the season, Richmond was traded to the Sacramento Kings after three seasons with the Warriors.

== Draft picks ==
Round	Pick	Player	Position	Nationality	College
1	11	Tyrone Hill	PF	United States	Xavier
2	28	Les Jepsen	C	United States	Iowa
2	34	Kevin Pritchard	PG	United States	Kansas

== Roster ==
1990–91 Golden State Warriors roster
Players

Pos.	No.	Player	Height	Weight	DOB	From
G	4	Vincent Askew	6 ft 6 in (1.98 m)	210 lb (95 kg)	1966–02–28	Memphis
F	20	Mario Elie	6 ft 5 in (1.96 m)	210 lb (95 kg)	1963–11–26	American International
G	10	Tim Hardaway	6 ft 0 in (1.83 m)	175 lb (79 kg)	1966–09–01	UTEP
F	22	Rod Higgins	6 ft 7 in (2.01 m)	200 lb (91 kg)	1960–01–31	Fresno State
F	32	Tyrone Hill	6 ft 9 in (2.06 m)	240 lb (109 kg)	1968–03–19	Xavier
C	51	Les Jepsen	7 ft 0 in (2.13 m)	237 lb (108 kg)	1967–06–24	Iowa
C	53	Alton Lister	7 ft 0 in (2.13 m)	240 lb (109 kg)	1958–10–01	Arizona State
G	13	Sarunas Marciulionis	6 ft 5 in (1.96 m)	200 lb (91 kg)	1964–06–13	Lithuania
C	44	Paul Mokeski	7 ft 0 in (2.13 m)	250 lb (113 kg)	1957–01–03	Kansas
F	17	Chris Mullin	6 ft 6 in (1.98 m)	200 lb (91 kg)	1963–07–30	St. John's
C	43	Jim Petersen	6 ft 10 in (2.08 m)	235 lb (107 kg)	1962–02–22	Minnesota
G	23	Mitch Richmond	6 ft 5 in (1.96 m)	215 lb (98 kg)	1965–06–30	Kansas State
F	3	Tom Tolbert	6 ft 7 in (2.01 m)	235 lb (107 kg)	1965–10–16	Arizona

Coaches
Head coach
- Don Nelson
Assistant(s)
- Larry Farmer
- Garry St. Jean
- Donnie Nelson

Legend
- (DP) Unsigned draft pick
- (FA) Free agent
- (S) Suspended
- Injured

Roster
Updated: April 6, 1991

== Regular season ==
=== Season standings ===
Pacific Division	W	L	PCT	GB	Home	Road	Div
y-Portland Trail Blazers	63	19	.768	—	36–5	27–14	18-10
x-Los Angeles Lakers	58	24	.707	5	33–8	25-16	19-9
x-Phoenix Suns	55	27	.671	8	32–9	23-18	17–11
x-Golden State Warriors	44	38	.537	19	30–11	14–27	13–15
x-Seattle SuperSonics	41	41	.500	22	28-13	13–28	12-16
Los Angeles Clippers	31	51	.378	32	23–18	8-33	10-18
Sacramento Kings	25	57	.305	38	24-17	1–40	9–19

y - clinched division title
x - clinched playoff spot

#	Western Conference				
#	Team	W	L	PCT	GB
1	z-Portland Trail Blazers	63	19	.768	–
2	y-San Antonio Spurs	55	27	.671	8
3	x-Los Angeles Lakers	58	24	.707	5
4	x-Phoenix Suns	55	27	.671	8
5	x-Utah Jazz	54	28	.659	9
6	x-Houston Rockets	52	30	.634	11
7	x-Golden State Warriors	44	38	.537	19
8	x-Seattle SuperSonics	41	41	.500	22
9	Orlando Magic	31	51	.378	32
10	Los Angeles Clippers	31	51	.378	32
11	Minnesota Timberwolves	29	53	.354	34
12	Dallas Mavericks	28	54	.341	35
13	Sacramento Kings	25	57	.305	38
14	Denver Nuggets	20	62	.244	43

z - clinched division title
y - clinched division title
x - clinched playoff spot

== Playoffs ==
1991 playoff game log
First round: 3–1 (home: 2–0; road: 1–1)

Game	Date	Team	Score	High points	High rebounds	High assists	Location Attendance	Series
1	April 25	@ San Antonio	L 121–130	Mullin, Richmond (29)	Chris Mullin (8)	Tim Hardaway (8)	HemisFair Arena; 15,908	0–1
2	April 27	@ San Antonio	W 111–98	Chris Mullin (27)	Chris Mullin (7)	Tim Hardaway (9)	HemisFair Arena; 15,908	1–1
3	May 1	San Antonio	W 109–106	Mitch Richmond (27)	Tim Hardaway (8)	Tim Hardaway (11)	Oakland–Alameda County Coliseum Arena; 15,025	2–1
4	May 3	San Antonio	W 110–97	Tim Hardaway (32)	Mitch Richmond (11)	Tim Hardaway (9)	Oakland–Alameda County Coliseum Arena; 15,025	3–1

Conference Semi-finals: 1–4 (home: 0–2; road: 1–2)

Game	Date	Team	Score	High points	High rebounds	High assists	Location Attendance	Series
1	May 5	@ L.A. Lakers	L 116–126	Tim Hardaway (33)	Alton Lister (8)	Hardaway, Marciulionis (9)	Great Western Forum; 17,505	0–1
2	May 8	@ L.A. Lakers	W 125–124	Chris Mullin (41)	Jim Petersen (7)	Tim Hardaway (14)	Great Western Forum; 17,505	1–1
3	May 10	L.A. Lakers	L 112–115	Richmond, Hardaway (24)	Chris Mullin (11)	Tim Hardaway (12)	Oakland–Alameda County Coliseum Arena; 15,025	1–2
4	May 12	L.A. Lakers	L 107–123	Mitch Richmond (26)	Richmond, Mullin (6)	Tim Hardaway (9)	Oakland–Alameda County Coliseum Arena	1–3
5	May 14	@ L.A. Lakers	L 119–124 (OT)	Tim Hardaway (27)	Mullin, Lister (8)	Tim Hardaway (20)	Great Western Forum; 17,505	1–4

1991 schedule

== Player statistics ==
Legend
GP	Games played	GS	Games started	MPG	Minutes per game
FG%	Field-goal percentage	3P%	3-point field-goal percentage	FT%	Free-throw percentage
RPG	Rebounds per game	APG	Assists per game	SPG	Steals per game
BPG	Blocks per game	PPG	Points per game

=== Regular season ===
Player	GP	GS	MPG	FG%	3P%	FT%	RPG	APG	SPG	BPG	PPG
Chris Mullin	82	82	40.4	.536	.301	.884	5.4	4.0	2.1	.8	25.7
Tim Hardaway	82	82	39.2	.476	.385	.803	4.0	9.7	2.6	.1	22.9
Rod Higgins	82	9	24.7	.463	.332	.819	4.3	1.4	.6	.5	9.5
Mitch Richmond	77	77	39.3	.494	.348	.847	5.9	3.1	1.6	.4	23.9
Alton Lister	77	65	20.2	.478	.000	.569	6.3	1.2	.3	1.2	6.4
Tyrone Hill	74	22	16.1	.492		.632	5.2	.3	.4	.4	5.3
Tom Tolbert	62	32	22.1	.423	.333	.738	4.4	1.2	.6	.6	8.1
Jim Petersen	62	21	13.5	.483	.250	.658	3.2	.4	.2	.7	4.5
Kevin Pritchard	62	1	12.5	.384	.161	.805	1.0	1.3	.5	.1	3.9
Šarūnas Marčiulionis	50	10	19.7	.501	.167	.724	2.4	1.7	1.2	.1	10.9
Paul Mokeski	36	1	7.1	.356	.333	.800	1.9	.3	.2	.1	1.6
Mario Elie^{†}	30	0	20.8	.507	.375	.851	3.6	1.5	.6	.3	7.7
Steve Johnson	24	8	9.5	.540		.595	2.4	.7	.2	.2	3.8
Larry Robinson^{†}	24	0	7.1	.407		.533	1.0	.5	.4	.0	2.3
Les Jepsen	21	0	5.0	.306	.000	.667	1.8	.0	.0	.1	1.3
Vincent Askew	7	0	12.1	.480		.818	1.6	1.9	.3	.0	4.7
Mike Smrek^{†}	5	0	5.0	.545		.500	1.4	.2	.4	.0	2.8
Bart Kofoed	5	0	4.2	.000		.500	.6	.8	.0	.0	.6

=== Playoffs ===
Player	GP	GS	MPG	FG%	3P%	FT%	RPG	APG	SPG	BPG	PPG
Tim Hardaway	9	9	44.0	.486	.354	.789	3.7	11.2	3.1	.8	25.2
Mitch Richmond	9	9	41.3	.503	.333	.958	5.2	2.4	.6	.7	22.3
Mario Elie	9	7	21.9	.500	1.000	.844	3.6	1.4	.6	.1	9.3
Jim Petersen	9	4	13.0	.706		.625	3.0	.3	.2	.4	3.2
Rod Higgins	9	3	23.8	.426	.308	.821	3.2	2.0	.2	.9	9.2
Šarūnas Marčiulionis	9	0	22.9	.500	.000	.897	2.6	3.0	1.2	.1	13.2
Tom Tolbert	9	0	12.9	.424	.333	.273	2.0	.9	.3	.4	3.6
Tyrone Hill	9	0	8.9	.643	.000	.667	2.6	.2	.3	.4	2.4
Chris Mullin	8	8	45.8	.527	.692	.860	7.3	2.9	1.9	1.5	23.8
Alton Lister	6	5	12.0	.480		.400	4.7	.3	.0	1.2	4.3
Vincent Askew	6	0	6.8	.400		.500	1.8	.3	.3	.0	2.5
Paul Mokeski	3	0	2.7	1.000			.7	.3	.3	.0	.7

- ^{†} Denotes player spent time with another team in the season. Stats reflect time with the Warriors only.

Player statistics citation:

== Awards and records ==
- Chris Mullin, NBA All-Star Game
- Tim Hardaway, NBA All-Star Game
- Chris Mullin, All-NBA Second Team

== See also ==
- 1990-91 NBA season
