= 1990–91 Los Angeles Clippers season =

NBA professional basketball team season

- Head coach: Mike Schuler
- General manager: Elgin Baylor
- Owner: Donald Sterling
- Arena: Los Angeles Memorial Sports Arena

Results
- Record: 31–51 (.378)
- Place: Division: 6th (Pacific); Conference: 10th (Western)
- Playoff finish: Did not qualify
- Stats at Basketball Reference

Local media
- Television: KTLA (Ralph Lawler, Mike Fratello); Prime Ticket (Tom Kelly, Earl Strom)
- Radio: KRLA (Rich Marotta)

The 1990–91 Los Angeles Clippers season was the 21st season for the Los Angeles Clippers in the National Basketball Association, and their seventh season in Los Angeles, California.

== Season summary ==
=== Off-season ===
The Clippers received the eighth overall pick in the 1990 NBA draft, and selected shooting guard Bo Kimble out of Loyola Marymount, and also selected power forward Loy Vaught from the University of Michigan with the 13th overall pick. During the off-season, the team hired Mike Schuler as their new head coach.

=== Regular season ===
Under Schuler, and with the addition of Kimble and Vaught, the Clippers played around .500 in winning percentage with a 10–10 start to the regular season. However, the team continued to struggle losing 12 of their next 13 games, which included a seven-game losing streak between December and January, and later on held a 15–32 record at the All-Star break. Ron Harper only played just 39 games due to a knee injury. At mid-season, the team traded Benoit Benjamin to the Seattle SuperSonics in exchange for Olden Polynice. The Clippers posted a six-game losing streak between January and February, but posted a five-game winning streak in late March, and then lost six of their final seven games of the season. The Clippers finished in sixth place in the Pacific Division with a 31–51 record; the team reached 50 losses for the tenth consecutive season, and also missed the NBA playoffs for the 15th consecutive year.

Charles D. Smith averaged 20.0 points, 8.2 rebounds and 2.0 blocks per game, while Harper averaged 19.6 points, 5.4 assists and 1.7 steals per game, and Ken Norman provided the team with 17.4 points and 7.1 rebounds per game. In addition, Danny Manning provided with 15.9 points, 5.8 rebounds and 1.6 steals per game, while Gary Grant contributed 8.7 points, 8.6 assists and 1.5 steals per game, and Winston Garland contributed 8.2 points, 4.6 assists and 1.4 steals per game. Meanwhile, second-year guard Jeff Martin averaged 7.1 points per game, Kimble contributed 6.9 points per game, Vaught averaged 5.5 points and 4.8 rebounds per game, and Tom Garrick contributed 3.9 points and 3.3 assists per game.

The Clippers finished 21st in the NBA in home-game attendance, with an attendance of 522,111 at the Los Angeles Memorial Sports Arena during the regular season.

=== Aftermath ===
Following the season, Garland was traded to the Denver Nuggets on draft day.

== Draft picks ==
Round	Pick	Player	Position	Nationality	College
1	8	Bo Kimble	SG	United States	Loyola Marymount
1	13	Loy Vaught	PF	United States	Michigan

== Roster ==
1990–91 Los Angeles Clippers roster
Players

Pos.	No.	Player	Height	Weight	DOB	From
F	51	Ken Bannister	6 ft 9 in (2.06 m)	235 lb (107 kg)	1960–04–01	St. Augustine's
G	11	Winston Garland	6 ft 2 in (1.88 m)	170 lb (77 kg)	1964–12–19	Missouri State
G	22	Tom Garrick	6 ft 2 in (1.88 m)	185 lb (84 kg)	1966–07–07	Rhode Island
G	1	Gary Grant	6 ft 3 in (1.91 m)	185 lb (84 kg)	1965–04–21	Michigan
G	4	Ron Harper	6 ft 6 in (1.98 m)	185 lb (84 kg)	1964–01–20	Miami (OH)
G	30	Bo Kimble	6 ft 4 in (1.93 m)	190 lb (86 kg)	1966–04–09	Loyola Marymount
F	5	Danny Manning	6 ft 10 in (2.08 m)	230 lb (104 kg)	1966–05–17	Kansas
G	15	Jeff Martin	6 ft 5 in (1.96 m)	195 lb (88 kg)	1967–01–14	Murray State
F	3	Ken Norman	6 ft 8 in (2.03 m)	215 lb (98 kg)	1964–09–05	Illinois
C	0	Olden Polynice	6 ft 11 in (2.11 m)	220 lb (100 kg)	1964–11–21	Virginia
F	54	Charles D. Smith	6 ft 10 in (2.08 m)	230 lb (104 kg)	1965–07–16	Pittsburgh
C	52	Mike Smrek	7 ft 0 in (2.13 m)	250 lb (113 kg)	1962–08–31	Canisius
F	35	Loy Vaught	6 ft 9 in (2.06 m)	230 lb (104 kg)	1968–02–27	Michigan

Coaches
Head coach
- Mike Schuler
Assistant(s)
- Mack Calvin
- Alvin Gentry
- John Hammond

Legend
- (DP) Unsigned draft pick
- (FA) Free agent
- (S) Suspended
- Injured

=== Roster notes ===
- Center Mike Smrek became the 4th former Laker to play with the crosstown rival Clippers.

== Regular season ==
=== Season standings ===
Pacific Division	W	L	PCT	GB	Home	Road	Div
y-Portland Trail Blazers	63	19	.768	—	36–5	27–14	18-10
x-Los Angeles Lakers	58	24	.707	5	33–8	25-16	19-9
x-Phoenix Suns	55	27	.671	8	32–9	23-18	17–11
x-Golden State Warriors	44	38	.537	19	30–11	14–27	13–15
x-Seattle SuperSonics	41	41	.500	22	28-13	13–28	12-16
Los Angeles Clippers	31	51	.378	32	23–18	8-33	10-18
Sacramento Kings	25	57	.305	38	24-17	1–40	9–19

y - clinched division title
x - clinched playoff spot

#	Western Conference				
#	Team	W	L	PCT	GB
1	z-Portland Trail Blazers	63	19	.768	–
2	y-San Antonio Spurs	55	27	.671	8
3	x-Los Angeles Lakers	58	24	.707	5
4	x-Phoenix Suns	55	27	.671	8
5	x-Utah Jazz	54	28	.659	9
6	x-Houston Rockets	52	30	.634	11
7	x-Golden State Warriors	44	38	.537	19
8	x-Seattle SuperSonics	41	41	.500	22
9	Orlando Magic	31	51	.378	32
10	Los Angeles Clippers	31	51	.378	32
11	Minnesota Timberwolves	29	53	.354	34
12	Dallas Mavericks	28	54	.341	35
13	Sacramento Kings	25	57	.305	38
14	Denver Nuggets	20	62	.244	43

z - clinched division title
y - clinched division title
x - clinched playoff spot

== Player statistics ==
Legend
GP	Games played	GS	Games started	MPG	Minutes per game
FG%	Field-goal percentage	3P%	3-point field-goal percentage	FT%	Free-throw percentage
RPG	Rebounds per game	APG	Assists per game	SPG	Steals per game
BPG	Blocks per game	PPG	Points per game

Player	GP	GS	MPG	FG%	3P%	FT%	RPG	APG	SPG	BPG	PPG
Charles Smith	74	74	36.5	46.9	0.0	79.3	8.2	1.8	1.1	2.0	20.0
Ron Harper	39	34	35.5	39.1	32.4	66.8	4.8	5.4	1.7	0.9	19.6
Ken Norman	70	45	33.0	50.1	18.8	62.9	7.1	2.3	0.9	0.9	17.4
Danny Manning	73	47	30.1	51.9	0.0	71.6	5.8	2.7	1.6	0.8	15.9
Benoit Benjamin	39	38	34.3	49.2	0.0	72.8	12.0	1.9	0.7	2.3	14.9
Olden Polynice	31	30	36.5	57.9	0.0	57.2	9.1	0.8	0.5	0.4	12.3
Gary Grant	68	65	31.0	45.1	23.1	68.9	3.1	8.6	1.5	0.2	8.7
Winston Garland	69	26	24.7	42.6	15.4	75.2	2.9	4.6	1.4	0.1	8.2
Jeff Martin	74	26	18.0	42.2	30.7	68.0	1.8	0.9	0.5	0.4	7.1
Bo Kimble	62	22	16.2	38.0	29.2	77.3	1.9	1.2	0.5	0.1	6.9
Loy Vaught	73	0	16.1	48.7	0.0	66.2	4.8	0.5	0.3	0.3	5.5
Tom Garrick	67	0	14.2	42.4	0.0	75.9	1.9	3.3	0.9	0.0	3.9
Ken Bannister	47	3	7.2	53.1	0.0	38.5	2.0	0.2	0.1	0.1	2.4
Greg Butler	9	0	4.1	26.3	0.0	66.7	1.8	0.1	0.0	0.0	1.6
Cedric Ball	7	0	3.7	37.5	0.0	100.0	1.6	0.0	0.0	0.3	1.1
Mike Smrek	10	0	7.0	18.8	0.0	50.0	1.9	0.3	0.1	0.3	1.0

Player statistics citation:

== Transactions ==
The Clippers were involved in the following transactions during the 1990–91 season.

=== Trades ===
February 20, 1991
To Los Angeles Clippers

- Olden Polynice & 1993 and 1994 first-round draft picks
To Seattle SuperSonics

- Benoit Benjamin

Player Transactions Citation:

== See also ==
- 1990-91 NBA season
