= 1990–91 Utah Jazz season =

NBA professional basketball team season

- Head coach: Jerry Sloan
- General manager: Tim Howells
- Owner: Larry H. Miller
- Arena: Salt Palace

Results
- Record: 54–28 (.659)
- Place: Division: 2nd (Midwest); Conference: 5th (Western)
- Playoff finish: Conference semifinals (lost to Trail Blazers 1–4)
- Stats at Basketball Reference

Local media
- Television: KSTU; Prime Sports Intermountain West
- Radio: KALL

The 1990–91 Utah Jazz season was the 17th season for the Utah Jazz in the National Basketball Association, and their 12th season in Salt Lake City, Utah.

== Season summary ==
=== Off-season ===
During the off-season, the Jazz acquired former All-Star guard Jeff Malone from the Washington Bullets in a three-team trade.

=== Regular season ===
Early into the regular season, the Jazz traveled overseas to Tokyo, Japan to play their first two games against the Phoenix Suns at the Tokyo Metropolitan Gymnasium; this marked the first time that two teams in U.S. professional sports played a regular season game outside of North America. In the first game on November 2, 1990, the Jazz were the home team and lost to the Suns by a score of 119–96; Karl Malone and John Stockton both posted double-doubles, as Malone finished with 33 points and 10 rebounds, while Stockton contributed 16 points and 12 assists. In the second game on November 3, the Jazz were the road team and defeated the Suns by a score of 102–101; Karl Malone posted a double-double of 29 points and 14 rebounds, while Stockton added 15 points, and Thurl Bailey contributed 15 points and 9 rebounds. Both games had an attendance of 10,111 fans at the Tokyo Metropolitan Gymnasium.

With the addition of Jeff Malone, the Jazz struggled losing six of their first nine games of the regular season, but then won eleven of their next twelve games, which included a six-game winning streak in December. The team posted another six-game winning streak between December and January, and later on held a 30–16 record at the All-Star break. The Jazz won eight of their final eleven games of the season, and finished in second place in the Midwest Division with a 54–28 record, earning the fifth seed in the Western Conference; the team qualified for the NBA playoffs for the eighth consecutive year.

Karl Malone averaged 29.0 points and 11.8 rebounds per game, and was named to the All-NBA First Team, while Jeff Malone finished second on the team in scoring with 18.6 points per game, and Stockton provided the team with 17.2 points, 14.2 assists and 2.9 steals per game, and was named to the All-NBA Third Team, and to the NBA All-Defensive Second Team. In addition, Bailey provided with 12.4 points and 5.0 rebounds per game, while second-year guard Blue Edwards contributed 9.3 points per game, Darrell Griffith contributed 5.7 points per game, Mark Eaton averaged 5.1 points, 8.3 rebounds and 2.4 blocks per game, and Mike Brown provided with 4.8 points and 4.1 rebounds per game.

During the NBA All-Star weekend at the Charlotte Coliseum in Charlotte, North Carolina, Karl Malone and Stockton were both selected for the 1991 NBA All-Star Game, as members of the Western Conference All-Star team, while Edwards participated in the NBA Slam Dunk Contest. Karl Malone also finished in fifth place in Most Valuable Player voting, while Stockton finished in twelfth place; Stockton also finished tied in seventh place in Defensive Player of the Year voting, and Bailey finished tied in sixth place in Sixth Man of the Year voting.

The Jazz finished 22nd in the NBA in home-game attendance, with an attendance of 514,751 at the Salt Palace during the regular season.

=== NBA playoffs ===
In the Western Conference First Round of the 1991 NBA playoffs, and for the second consecutive year, the Jazz faced off against the 4th–seeded Suns, a team that featured the trio of All-Star guard Kevin Johnson, All-Star forward Tom Chambers, and Jeff Hornacek. The Jazz won Game 1 over the Suns on the road by a 39-point margin, 129–90 at the Arizona Veterans Memorial Coliseum while shooting .651 in field-goal percentage, before losing Game 2 on the road by a score of 102–92. With the series tied at 1–1, the Jazz won the next two games, which included a Game 4 home win over the Suns, 101–93 at the Salt Palace to win the series in four games.

In the Western Conference Semi-finals, the team faced off against the top–seeded, and Pacific Division champion Portland Trail Blazers, who were led by the All-Star trio of Clyde Drexler, Terry Porter and Kevin Duckworth. The Jazz lost the first two games to the Trail Blazers on the road at the Memorial Coliseum, but managed to win Game 3 at the Salt Palace, 107–101. However, the Jazz lost the next two games, including a Game 5 loss to the Trail Blazers at the Memorial Coliseum, 103–96, thus losing the series in five games.

=== Aftermath ===
This was also the Jazz's final season in which they played their home games at the Salt Palace. Following the season, Griffith was released to free agency and then retired.

== Draft picks ==
Round	Pick	Player	Position	Nationality	College
2	33	Walter Palmer	C/F	United States	Dartmouth

== Roster ==
1990–91 Utah Jazz roster
Players

Pos.	No.	Player	Height	Weight	DOB	From
F	41	Thurl Bailey	6 ft 11 in (2.11 m)	215 lb (98 kg)	1961–04–07	NC State
C	40	Mike Brown	6 ft 9 in (2.06 m)	257 lb (117 kg)	1963–07–19	George Washington
G	21	Tony Brown	6 ft 6 in (1.98 m)	185 lb (84 kg)	1960–07–29	Arkansas
C	53	Mark Eaton	7 ft 4 in (2.24 m)	275 lb (125 kg)	1957–01–24	UCLA
F	30	Blue Edwards	6 ft 4 in (1.93 m)	200 lb (91 kg)	1965–10–31	East Carolina
G	35	Darrell Griffith	6 ft 4 in (1.93 m)	190 lb (86 kg)	1958–06–16	Louisville
G	24	Jeff Malone	6 ft 4 in (1.93 m)	205 lb (93 kg)	1961–06–28	Mississippi State
F	32	Karl Malone	6 ft 9 in (2.06 m)	250 lb (113 kg)	1963–07–24	Louisiana Tech
C	33	Walter Palmer	7 ft 1 in (2.16 m)	215 lb (98 kg)	1968–10–23	Dartmouth
G	11	Delaney Rudd	6 ft 2 in (1.88 m)	180 lb (82 kg)	1962–11–08	Wake Forest
G	12	John Stockton	6 ft 1 in (1.85 m)	170 lb (77 kg)	1962–03–26	Gonzaga
F	5	Andy Toolson	6 ft 6 in (1.98 m)	210 lb (95 kg)	1966–01–19	BYU

Coaches
Head coach
- Jerry Sloan
Assistant(s)
- Gordon Chiesa
- David Fredman
- Phil Johnson

Legend
- (DP) Unsigned draft pick
- (FA) Free agent
- (S) Suspended
- Injured

Roster
Updated: April 1, 1991

== Regular season ==
=== Season standings ===
Midwest Division	W	L	PCT	GB	Home	Road	Div
y-San Antonio Spurs	55	27	.671	—	33–8	22–19	20–8
x-Utah Jazz	54	28	.659	1	36–5	18–23	21-7
x-Houston Rockets	52	30	.634	3	31-10	21–20	20-8
Orlando Magic	31	51	.378	24	24-17	7–34	13–15
Minnesota Timberwolves	29	53	.354	26	21-20	8-33	9-19
Dallas Mavericks	28	54	.341	27	20-21	8–33	7-21
Denver Nuggets	20	62	.244	35	17-24	3-38	8–20

y - clinched division title
x - clinched playoff spot

#	Western Conference				
#	Team	W	L	PCT	GB
1	z-Portland Trail Blazers	63	19	.768	–
2	y-San Antonio Spurs	55	27	.671	8
3	x-Los Angeles Lakers	58	24	.707	5
4	x-Phoenix Suns	55	27	.671	8
5	x-Utah Jazz	54	28	.659	9
6	x-Houston Rockets	52	30	.634	11
7	x-Golden State Warriors	44	38	.537	19
8	x-Seattle SuperSonics	41	41	.500	22
9	Orlando Magic	31	51	.378	32
10	Los Angeles Clippers	31	51	.378	32
11	Minnesota Timberwolves	29	53	.354	34
12	Dallas Mavericks	28	54	.341	35
13	Sacramento Kings	25	57	.305	38
14	Denver Nuggets	20	62	.244	43

z - clinched division title
y - clinched division title
x - clinched playoff spot

== Playoffs ==
1991 playoff game log
First Round: 3–1 (home: 2–0; road: 1–1)

Game	Date	Team	Score	High points	High rebounds	High assists	Location Attendance	Series
1	April 25	@ Phoenix	W 129–90	Karl Malone (27)	Karl Malone (10)	John Stockton (15)	Arizona Veterans Memorial Coliseum; 14,487	1–0
2	April 27	@ Phoenix	L 92–102	Jeff Malone (23)	Karl Malone (14)	John Stockton (11)	Arizona Veterans Memorial Coliseum; 14,487	1–1
3	April 30	Phoenix	W 107–98	Karl Malone (32)	Mike Brown (11)	John Stockton (12)	Salt Palace; 12,616	2–1
4	May 2	Phoenix	W 101–93	Karl Malone (38)	Karl Malone (13)	John Stockton (13)	Salt Palace; 12,616	3–1

Conference semifinals: 1–4 (home: 1–1; road: 0–3)

Game	Date	Team	Score	High points	High rebounds	High assists	Location Attendance	Series
1	May 7	@ Portland	L 97–117	John Stockton (23)	Karl Malone (16)	John Stockton (16)	Memorial Coliseum; 12,884	0–1
2	May 9	@ Portland	L 116–118	Karl Malone (40)	Karl Malone (16)	John Stockton (12)	Memorial Coliseum; 12,884	0–2
3	May 11	Portland	W 107–101	Karl Malone (30)	Karl Malone (21)	John Stockton (15)	Delta Center; 12,616	1–2
4	May 12	Portland	L 101–104	Karl Malone (31)	Karl Malone (12)	John Stockton (16)	Delta Center; 12,616	1–3
5	May 14	@ Portland	L 96–103	Karl Malone (26)	K. Malone, Eaton (8)	John Stockton (14)	Memorial Coliseum; 12,884	1–4

1991 schedule

== Player statistics ==
Legend
GP	Games played	GS	Games started	MPG	Minutes per game
FG%	Field-goal percentage	3P%	3-point field-goal percentage	FT%	Free-throw percentage
RPG	Rebounds per game	APG	Assists per game	SPG	Steals per game
BPG	Blocks per game	PPG	Points per game

=== Season ===
Player	GP	GS	MPG	FG%	3FG%	FT%	RPG	APG	SPG	BPG	PPG
Karl Malone	82	82	40.3	.527	.286	.770	11.8	3.3	1.1	1.0	29.0
Jeff Malone	69	69	35.7	.508	.167	.917	3.0	2.1	0.7	0.1	18.6
John Stockton	82	82	37.8	.507	.345	.836	2.9	14.2	2.9	0.2	17.2
Thurl Bailey	82	22	30.3	.458	.000	.808	5.0	1.5	0.6	1.1	12.4
Blue Edwards	62	56	26.0	.526	.250	.701	3.2	1.7	0.9	0.5	9.3
Darrell Griffith	75	2	13.4	.391	.348	.756	1.2	0.5	0.6	0.1	5.7
Mark Eaton	80	80	32.3	.579		.634	8.3	0.6	0.5	2.4	5.1
Mike Brown	82	2	17.0	.454		.742	4.1	0.6	0.4	0.3	4.8
Delaney Rudd	82	0	10.7	.435	.279	.831	0.8	2.6	0.4	0.0	4.0
Pat Cummings	4	0	6.5	.667		.700	1.3	0.0	0.0	0.0	3.8
Tony Brown	23	0	11.6	.364	.182	.870	1.7	0.6	0.2	0.0	3.4
Andy Toolson	47	15	10.0	.403	.375	.758	1.4	0.7	0.3	0.0	2.9
Walter Palmer	28	0	3.0	.333	.000	.667	0.8	0.2	0.1	0.1	1.4
Chris Munk	11	0	2.6	.429		.583	1.3	0.1	0.1	0.2	1.2
Dan O'Sullivan	21	0	4.0	.438		.636	0.8	0.2	0.0	0.0	1.0

=== Playoffs ===
Player	GP	GS	MPG	FG%	3FG%	FT%	RPG	APG	SPG	BPG	PPG
Karl Malone	9	9	42.6	.455	.000	.846	13.3	3.2	1.0	1.2	29.7
Jeff Malone	9	9	39.0	.493	.000	.917	3.9	3.2	1.0	0.1	20.7
John Stockton	9	9	41.4	.537	.407	.841	4.7	13.8	2.2	0.2	18.2
Blue Edwards	9	9	26.8	.481	.500	.800	3.1	1.8	0.9	0.1	10.1
Mike Brown	9	0	24.8	.482		.842	7.3	0.6	0.3	0.1	9.6
Thurl Bailey	9	0	25.3	.359		.880	3.6	1.0	0.3	0.7	7.6
Mark Eaton	9	9	28.3	.516		.583	6.2	0.6	0.1	1.4	4.3
Darrell Griffith	3	0	3.0	.714			0.7	0.0	0.0	0.0	3.3
Delaney Rudd	9	0	6.4	.429	.333	.500	0.2	1.9	0.3	0.0	2.7
Tony Brown	4	0	7.3	.500	.500		0.8	0.3	0.0	0.0	2.3
Walter Palmer	2	0	3.0	.250			0.5	0.0	0.0	0.0	1.0
Andy Toolson	2	0	2.0	.000	.000		0.0	0.5	0.5	0.0	0.0

Player statistics citation:

== Awards and records ==
- Karl Malone, All-NBA First Team
- John Stockton, All-NBA Third Team
- John Stockton, NBA All-Defensive Second Team

== See also ==
- 1990-91 NBA season
