= 1990–91 Charlotte Hornets season =

NBA professional basketball team season

- Head coach: Gene Littles
- General manager: Allan Bristow
- Owner: George Shinn
- Arena: Charlotte Coliseum

Results
- Record: 26–56 (.317)
- Place: Division: 7th (Central); Conference: 11th (Eastern)
- Playoff finish: Did not qualify
- Stats at Basketball Reference

Local media
- Television: WCCB; SportSouth (Steve Martin, Gerry Vaillancourt)
- Radio: WBT (Matt Pinto, Gil McGregor)

The 1990–91 Charlotte Hornets season was the third season for the Charlotte Hornets in the National Basketball Association. The city of Charlotte, North Carolina hosted the NBA All-Star weekend at the Charlotte Coliseum this season, which featured the 1991 NBA All-Star Game.

== Season summary ==
=== Off-season ===
The Hornets received the fifth overall pick in the 1990 NBA draft, and selected shooting guard Kendall Gill from the University of Illinois. During the off-season, the team signed free agent Johnny Newman. After playing in the Midwest Division in the Western Conference the previous season, the Hornets returned to the Eastern Conference, and moved into the Central Division this season.

=== Regular season ===
With the addition of Newman and Gill, the Hornets started to show improvement playing around .500 in winning percentage, with an 8–7 start to the regular season in November. However, the team continued to struggle as they posted an 11-game losing streak in December afterwards. In January, the team traded Armen Gilliam to the Philadelphia 76ers in exchange for Mike Gminski. The Hornets later on held a 14–33 record at the All-Star break. The franchise improved seven games over the previous season, finishing in last place in the Central Division with a 26–56 record; however, the team finished last place in their division for the third consecutive year.

Newman averaged 16.9 points and 1.2 steals per game, while Rex Chapman averaged 15.7 points and 3.6 assists per game, and Gminski provided the team with 11.4 points and 7.6 rebounds per game in 50 games after the trade. In addition, second-year forward J.R. Reid provided with 11.3 points and 6.3 rebounds per game, while Gill contributed 11.0 points, 3.7 assists and 1.3 steals per game, and was named to the NBA All-Rookie First Team, and Muggsy Bogues provided with 7.0 points, 8.3 assists and 1.7 steals per game. Off the bench, Dell Curry contributed 10.6 points per game, while Kenny Gattison averaged 9.0 points and 5.3 rebounds per game, and Kelly Tripucka provided with 7.0 points per game.

During the NBA All-Star weekend at the Charlotte Coliseum in Charlotte, Chapman and Gill both participated in the NBA Slam Dunk Contest; it was the second consecutive appearance for Chapman in the Slam Dunk Contest. Chapman also finished tied in eighth place in Most Improved Player voting. The Hornets led the NBA in home-game attendance for the second time in three seasons, with an attendance of 978,141 at the Charlotte Coliseum during the regular season.

=== Aftermath ===
Following the season, Tripucka retired, and Gene Littles resigned as head coach.

== Offseason ==
=== NBA draft ===
Round	Pick	Player	Position	Nationality	College
1	5	Kendall Gill	SG/SF	United States	Illinois
2	39	Steve Scheffler	C/PF	United States	Purdue

== Roster ==
1990–91 Charlotte Hornets roster
Players

Pos.	No.	Player	Height	Weight	DOB	From
G	1	Muggsy Bogues	5 ft 3 in (1.60 m)	136 lb (62 kg)	1965–01–09	Wake Forest
G	3	Rex Chapman	6 ft 4 in (1.93 m)	185 lb (84 kg)	1967–10–05	Kentucky
G	30	Dell Curry	6 ft 4 in (1.93 m)	190 lb (86 kg)	1964–06–25	Virginia Tech
F	33	Kenny Gattison	6 ft 8 in (2.03 m)	225 lb (102 kg)	1964–05–23	Old Dominion
G	13	Kendall Gill	6 ft 5 in (1.96 m)	195 lb (88 kg)	1968–05–25	Illinois
C	42	Mike Gminski	6 ft 11 in (2.11 m)	250 lb (113 kg)	1959–08–03	Duke
G	4	Scott Haffner	6 ft 3 in (1.91 m)	180 lb (82 kg)	1966–02–02	Evansville
F	31	Randolph Keys	6 ft 7 in (2.01 m)	195 lb (88 kg)	1966–04–19	Southern Miss
C	45	Eric Leckner	6 ft 11 in (2.11 m)	265 lb (120 kg)	1966–05–27	Wyoming
F	22	Johnny Newman	6 ft 7 in (2.01 m)	190 lb (86 kg)	1963–11–28	Richmond
C	34	J. R. Reid	6 ft 9 in (2.06 m)	247 lb (112 kg)	1968–03–31	North Carolina
C	55	Steve Scheffler	6 ft 9 in (2.06 m)	250 lb (113 kg)	1967–09–03	Purdue
F	7	Kelly Tripucka	6 ft 6 in (1.98 m)	220 lb (100 kg)	1959–02–16	Notre Dame

Coaches
Head coach
- Gene Littles
Assistant(s)
- Tom Nissalke
- Mike Pratt

Legend
- (DP) Unsigned draft pick
- (FA) Free agent
- (S) Suspended
- Injured

Roster
Updated: April 17, 1991

== Regular season ==
=== Season standings ===
Central Division	W	L	PCT	GB	Home	Road	Div
y-Chicago Bulls	61	21	.744	—	35–6	26–15	25–5
x-Detroit Pistons	50	32	.610	11	32–9	18–23	19–11
x-Milwaukee Bucks	48	34	.585	13	33–8	15–26	16–14
x-Atlanta Hawks	43	39	.524	18	29–12	14–27	11–19
x-Indiana Pacers	41	41	.500	20	29–12	12–29	15–15
Cleveland Cavaliers	33	49	.402	28	23–18	10–31	11–19
Charlotte Hornets	26	56	.317	35	17–24	9–32	8–22

#	Eastern Conference				
#	Team	W	L	PCT	GB
1	c-Chicago Bulls	61	21	.744	–
2	y-Boston Celtics	56	26	.683	5
3	x-Detroit Pistons	50	32	.610	11
4	x-Milwaukee Bucks	48	34	.585	13
5	x-Philadelphia 76ers	44	38	.537	17
6	x-Atlanta Hawks	43	39	.524	18
7	x-Indiana Pacers	41	41	.500	20
8	x-New York Knicks	39	43	.476	22
9	Cleveland Cavaliers	33	49	.402	28
10	Washington Bullets	30	52	.366	31
11	New Jersey Nets	26	56	.317	35
12	Charlotte Hornets	26	56	.317	35
13	Miami Heat	24	58	.293	37

z – clinched division title
y – clinched division title
x – clinched playoff spot

== Player statistics ==
=== Ragular season ===
Player	POS	GP	GS	MP	REB	AST	STL	BLK	PTS	MPG	RPG	APG	SPG	BPG	PPG
Kendall Gill	SG	82	36	1,944	263	303	104	39	906	23.7	3.2	3.7	1.3	.5	11.0
Johnny Newman	SF	81	81	2,477	254	188	100	17	1,371	30.6	3.1	2.3	1.2	.2	16.9
Muggsy Bogues	PG	81	46	2,299	216	669	137	3	568	28.4	2.7	8.3	1.7	.0	7.0
J. R. Reid	C	80	80	2,467	502	89	87	47	902	30.8	6.3	1.1	1.1	.6	11.3
Kelly Tripucka	SF	77	1	1,289	176	159	33	13	541	16.7	2.3	2.1	.4	.2	7.0
Dell Curry	SG	76	14	1,515	199	166	75	25	802	19.9	2.6	2.2	1.0	.3	10.6
Kenny Gattison	PF	72	6	1,552	379	44	48	67	650	21.6	5.3	.6	.7	.9	9.0
Rex Chapman	PG	70	68	2,100	191	250	73	16	1,102	30.0	2.7	3.6	1.0	.2	15.7
Mike Gminski^{†}	C	50	50	1,405	381	60	24	22	572	28.1	7.6	1.2	.5	.4	11.4
Randolph Keys	SF	44	0	473	100	18	22	15	140	10.8	2.3	.4	.5	.3	3.2
Eric Leckner^{†}	C	40	2	744	208	21	10	11	230	18.6	5.2	.5	.3	.3	5.8
Steve Scheffler	C	39	0	227	45	9	6	2	59	5.8	1.2	.2	.2	.1	1.5
Armen Gilliam^{†}	PF	25	25	949	234	27	34	21	494	38.0	9.4	1.1	1.4	.8	19.8
Dave Hoppen^{†}	C	19	0	112	30	3	2	1	44	5.9	1.6	.2	.1	.1	2.3
Earl Cureton	PF	9	1	159	36	3	0	3	17	17.7	4.0	.3	.0	.3	1.9
Scott Haffner	PG	7	0	50	4	9	3	1	17	7.1	.6	1.3	.4	.1	2.4
Jeff Sanders	PF	3	0	43	9	1	1	1	13	14.3	3.0	.3	.3	.3	4.3

- ^{†} Denotes player spent time with another team in the season. Stats reflect time with the Hornets only.

== Awards and records ==
- Kendall Gill, NBA All-Rookie Team 1st Team

== Transactions ==
- July 28, 1990

Signed Johnny Newman as an unrestricted free agent.

- August 29, 1990

Signed Jim Les as a free agent.

- September 5, 1990

Waived Brian Rowsom.

- October 23, 1990

Waived Jim Les.

- October 24, 1990

Waived Andre Turner.

- October 30, 1990

Waived Richard Anderson.

Waived Mike Holton.

- January 4, 1991

Traded Armen Gilliam and Dave Hoppen to the Philadelphia 76ers for Mike Gminski.

- January 22, 1991

Signed Scott Haffner to the first of two 10-day contracts.

Signed Jeff Sanders to a 10-day contract.

- January 29, 1991

Traded a 1993 2nd round draft pick (Alex Holcombe was later selected) and a 1995 2nd round draft pick (Dejan Bodiroga was later selected) to the Sacramento Kings for Eric Leckner.

- January 31, 1991

Waived Jeff Sanders.

- February 11, 1991

Signed Scott Haffner to a contract for the rest of the season.

- April 17, 1991

Robert Reid signed as an unrestricted free agent with the Philadelphia 76ers.

- May 31, 1991

Waived Steve Scheffler.

Player Transactions Citation:
