= 1990–91 Orlando Magic season =

NBA professional basketball team season

- Head coach: Matt Guokas
- General manager: Pat Williams
- Owners: William du Pont III; James Hewitt; Robert Hewitt
- Arena: Orlando Arena

Results
- Record: 31–51 (.378)
- Place: Division: 4th (Midwest); Conference: 9th (Western)
- Playoff finish: Did not qualify
- Stats at Basketball Reference

Local media
- Television: WKCF; Sunshine Network
- Radio: WGTO

The 1990–91 Orlando Magic season was the second season for the Orlando Magic in the National Basketball Association.

== Season summary ==
=== Off-season ===
After finishing with an 18–64 record in their inaugural season, the Magic received the fourth overall pick in the 1990 NBA draft, and selected small forward Dennis Scott out of Georgia Tech University. During the off-season, the team signed free agent Greg Kite. After playing in the Central Division in the Eastern Conference the previous season, the Magic moved into the Western Conference, and settled into the Midwest Division this season.

=== Regular season ===
With the addition of Scott and Kite, the Magic continued to struggle in their second season, losing their first six games of the regular season. After a three-game winning streak, the team lost 16 of their next 18 games, which included a seven-game losing streak between November and December, and an eight-game losing streak in December, leading to a 5–22 start to the season. The Magic posted a six-game losing streak in January, and later on held a 14–33 record at the All-Star break. However, the team won eight of their eleven games in February, and played around .500 in winning percentage for the remainder of the season, finishing in fourth place in the Midwest Division with a 31–51 record, which was a 13-game improvement over their inaugural season.

Scott Skiles averaged 17.2 points and 8.4 assists per game, and was named the NBA Most Improved Player of the Year, while Scott averaged 15.7 points per game, led the Magic with 125 three-point field goals, and was named to the NBA All-Rookie First Team, and Terry Catledge provided the team with 14.6 points and 7.0 rebounds per game. In addition, second-year guard Nick Anderson provided with 14.1 points and 5.5 rebounds per game, while Otis Smith contributed 13.9 points and 5.2 rebounds per game, and Jerry Reynolds provided with 12.9 points and 1.2 steals per game. Meanwhile, Jeff Turner averaged 8.6 points and 5.1 rebounds per game, Sam Vincent contributed 8.3 points and 4.0 assists per game, and second-year forward Michael Ansley provided with 5.7 points and 3.8 rebounds per game. On the defensive side, Kite averaged 4.8 points and 7.2 rebounds per game, and Mark Acres contributed 4.2 points and 5.3 rebounds per game.

During the NBA All-Star weekend at the Charlotte Coliseum in Charlotte, North Carolina, Scott participated in the NBA Three-Point Shootout, while Smith participated in the NBA Slam Dunk Contest for the second time. Scott also finished in third place in Rookie of the Year voting, while Reynolds finished tied in sixth place in Sixth Man of the Year voting. The Magic finished 13th in the NBA in home-game attendance, with an attendance of 617,668 at the Orlando Arena during the regular season.

=== Notable highlights ===
One notable highlight of the regular season occurred on December 30, 1990, in a home game against the Denver Nuggets at the Orlando Arena. Skiles scored 22 points, and also set an NBA record of 30 assists in a single game, as the Magic defeated the Nuggets, 155–116.

=== Aftermath ===
Following the season, Ansley was released to free agency.

== Draft picks ==
| Round | Pick | Player | Position | Nationality | College |
|---|---|---|---|---|---|
| 1 | 4 | Dennis Scott | SF | United States | Georgia Tech |

== Roster ==
1990–91 Orlando Magic roster
Players

| Pos. | No. | Player | Height | Weight | DOB | From |
|---|---|---|---|---|---|---|
| C | 42 | Mark Acres | 6 ft 11 in (2.11 m) | 220 lb (100 kg) | 1962–11–15 | Oral Roberts |
| G/F | 25 | Nick Anderson | 6 ft 6 in (1.98 m) | 205 lb (93 kg) | 1968–01–20 | Illinois |
| F | 45 | Michael Ansley | 6 ft 7 in (2.01 m) | 225 lb (102 kg) | 1967–02–08 | Alabama |
| F | 33 | Terry Catledge | 6 ft 8 in (2.03 m) | 220 lb (100 kg) | 1963–08–22 | South Alabama |
| C | 34 | Greg Kite | 6 ft 11 in (2.11 m) | 250 lb (113 kg) | 1961–08–05 | BYU |
| G/F | 35 | Jerry Reynolds | 6 ft 8 in (2.03 m) | 200 lb (91 kg) | 1962–12–23 | LSU |
| G/F | 3 | Dennis Scott | 6 ft 8 in (2.03 m) | 229 lb (104 kg) | 1968–09–05 | Georgia Tech |
| G | 4 | Scott Skiles | 6 ft 1 in (1.85 m) | 180 lb (82 kg) | 1964–03–05 | Michigan State |
| G/F | 32 | Otis Smith | 6 ft 5 in (1.96 m) | 210 lb (95 kg) | 1964–01–30 | Jacksonville |
| F | 31 | Jeff Turner | 6 ft 9 in (2.06 m) | 230 lb (104 kg) | 1962–04–09 | Vanderbilt |
| G | 11 | Sam Vincent | 6 ft 2 in (1.88 m) | 185 lb (84 kg) | 1963–05–18 | Michigan State |
| G | 20 | Morlon Wiley | 6 ft 4 in (1.93 m) | 185 lb (84 kg) | 1966–09–24 | Long Beach State |

Coaches
Head coach
- Matt Guokas
Assistant(s)
- John Gabriel
- Brian Hill

Legend
- (DP) Unsigned draft pick
- (FA) Free agent
- (S) Suspended
- Injured

Roster
Updated: December 12, 1990

== Regular season ==
=== Season standings ===
| Midwest Division | W | L | PCT | GB | Home | Road | Div |
|---|---|---|---|---|---|---|---|
| y-San Antonio Spurs | 55 | 27 | .671 | — | 33–8 | 22–19 | 20–8 |
| x-Utah Jazz | 54 | 28 | .659 | 1 | 36–5 | 18–23 | 21-7 |
| x-Houston Rockets | 52 | 30 | .634 | 3 | 31-10 | 21–20 | 20-8 |
| Orlando Magic | 31 | 51 | .378 | 24 | 24-17 | 7–34 | 13–15 |
| Minnesota Timberwolves | 29 | 53 | .354 | 26 | 21-20 | 8-33 | 9-19 |
| Dallas Mavericks | 28 | 54 | .341 | 27 | 20-21 | 8–33 | 7-21 |
| Denver Nuggets | 20 | 62 | .244 | 35 | 17-24 | 3-38 | 8–20 |

y – clinched division title
x – clinched playoff spot

| # | Western Conference | | | | |
| # | Team | W | L | PCT | GB |
|---|---|---|---|---|---|
| 1 | z-Portland Trail Blazers | 63 | 19 | .768 | – |
| 2 | y-San Antonio Spurs | 55 | 27 | .671 | 8 |
| 3 | x-Los Angeles Lakers | 58 | 24 | .707 | 5 |
| 4 | x-Phoenix Suns | 55 | 27 | .671 | 8 |
| 5 | x-Utah Jazz | 54 | 28 | .659 | 9 |
| 6 | x-Houston Rockets | 52 | 30 | .634 | 11 |
| 7 | x-Golden State Warriors | 44 | 38 | .537 | 19 |
| 8 | x-Seattle SuperSonics | 41 | 41 | .500 | 22 |
| 9 | Orlando Magic | 31 | 51 | .378 | 32 |
| 10 | Los Angeles Clippers | 31 | 51 | .378 | 32 |
| 11 | Minnesota Timberwolves | 29 | 53 | .354 | 34 |
| 12 | Dallas Mavericks | 28 | 54 | .341 | 35 |
| 13 | Sacramento Kings | 25 | 57 | .305 | 38 |
| 14 | Denver Nuggets | 20 | 62 | .244 | 43 |

z – clinched division title
y – clinched division title
x – clinched playoff spot

== Player statistics ==
=== Regular season ===
| Player | POS | GP | GS | MP | REB | AST | STL | BLK | PTS | MPG | RPG | APG | SPG | BPG | PPG |
|---|---|---|---|---|---|---|---|---|---|---|---|---|---|---|---|
| Greg Kite | C | 82 | 82 | 2,225 | 588 | 59 | 25 | 81 | 395 | 27.1 | 7.2 | .7 | .3 | 1.0 | 4.8 |
| Dennis Scott | SG | 82 | 73 | 2,336 | 235 | 134 | 62 | 25 | 1,284 | 28.5 | 2.9 | 1.6 | .8 | .3 | 15.7 |
| Jerry Reynolds | SG | 80 | 9 | 1,843 | 299 | 203 | 95 | 56 | 1,034 | 23.0 | 3.7 | 2.5 | 1.2 | .7 | 12.9 |
| Scott Skiles | PG | 79 | 66 | 2,714 | 270 | 660 | 89 | 4 | 1,357 | 34.4 | 3.4 | 8.4 | 1.1 | .1 | 17.2 |
| Otis Smith | SF | 75 | 39 | 1,885 | 389 | 169 | 85 | 35 | 1,044 | 25.1 | 5.2 | 2.3 | 1.1 | .5 | 13.9 |
| Jeff Turner | PF | 71 | 43 | 1,683 | 363 | 97 | 29 | 10 | 609 | 23.7 | 5.1 | 1.4 | .4 | .1 | 8.6 |
| Nick Anderson | SG | 70 | 42 | 1,971 | 386 | 106 | 74 | 44 | 990 | 28.2 | 5.5 | 1.5 | 1.1 | .6 | 14.1 |
| Mark Acres | C | 68 | 0 | 1,313 | 359 | 25 | 25 | 25 | 285 | 19.3 | 5.3 | .4 | .4 | .4 | 4.2 |
| Michael Ansley | SF | 67 | 1 | 877 | 253 | 25 | 27 | 7 | 379 | 13.1 | 3.8 | .4 | .4 | .1 | 5.7 |
| Terry Catledge | PF | 51 | 38 | 1,459 | 355 | 58 | 34 | 9 | 745 | 28.6 | 7.0 | 1.1 | .7 | .2 | 14.6 |
| Sam Vincent | PG | 49 | 17 | 975 | 107 | 197 | 30 | 5 | 406 | 19.9 | 2.2 | 4.0 | .6 | .1 | 8.3 |
| Morlon Wiley | PG | 34 | 0 | 350 | 17 | 73 | 24 | 0 | 113 | 10.3 | .5 | 2.1 | .7 | .0 | 3.3 |
| Howard Wright^{†} | PF | 8 | 0 | 136 | 37 | 3 | 3 | 5 | 43 | 17.0 | 4.6 | .4 | .4 | .6 | 5.4 |
| Mark McNamara | C | 2 | 0 | 13 | 4 | 0 | 0 | 0 | 0 | 6.5 | 2.0 | .0 | .0 | .0 | .0 |

- ^{†} Denotes player spent time with another team in the season. Stats reflect time with the Magic only.

== Awards and records ==
- Scott Skiles – Most Improved Player
- Dennis Scott – All-Rookie 1st Team
