= Walter Palmer (basketball) =

American basketball player (born 1968)

Personal information
- Born: October 23, 1968 (age 58) Ithaca, New York, U.S.
- Listed height: 7 ft 1 in (2.16 m)
- Listed weight: 215 lb (98 kg)

Career information
- High school: Washington-Lee (Arlington County, Virginia)
- College: Dartmouth (1986–1990)
- NBA draft: 1990: 2nd round, 33rd overall pick
- Drafted by: Utah Jazz
- Playing career: 1990–2003
- Position: Center
- Number: 33, 31

Career history
- 1990–1991: Utah Jazz
- 1991–1992: EnBW Ludwigsburg
- 1992–1993: Dallas Mavericks
- 1993: Argal Huesca
- 1993–1994: EnBW Ludwigsburg
- 1994–1995: Fos-sur-mer Basket
- 1995: Olimpia Stefanel Milano
- 1995–1996: Ferro Carril Oeste
- 1996–1997: Gießen 46ers
- 1997–1999: Brose Baskets
- 1999–2000: Le Mans
- 2000–2001: Skyliners Frankfurt
- 2002–2003: Phantoms Braunschweig

Career highlights
- First-team All-Ivy League (1990)
- Stats at NBA.com
- Stats at Basketball Reference

Walter Scott Palmer (born October 23, 1968) is an American former professional basketball player who was selected by the Utah Jazz in the second round (33rd pick overall) of the 1990 NBA draft. A 7'1" center from Dartmouth College, Palmer played two years in the NBA for the Jazz and Dallas Mavericks. In his NBA career, he appeared in a total of 48 games and scored exactly 100 points, averaging 2.1 points per game.

Palmer later played in basketball leagues in Europe and South America, before transitioning into union activism on behalf of professional athletes in Europe. He co-founded SP.IN, the first basketball players union in Germany, and served as its general secretary. He became general secretary of the UBE, the federation of European basketball player unions and then co-founded and was the general secretary of the European Elite Athletes Association (EU Athletes) which represents over 25,000 athletes in a number of popular sports. He then worked as the Head of Department for UNI Sport PRO (now the World Players Association), a global platform for athlete unions and a sector of UNI Global Union. In 2014 he was hired as the Director for International Relations and Marketing of the NBA Players Association before resigning in June, 2015. He now works as a consultant for different players associations and sports related businesses.
