= 1990–91 Minnesota Timberwolves season =

NBA professional basketball team season

- Head coach: Bill Musselman
- Arena: Target Center

Results
- Record: 29–53 (.354)
- Place: Division: 5th (Midwest); Conference: 11th (Western)
- Playoff finish: Did not qualify
- Stats at Basketball Reference

Local media
- Television: KSTP-TV/KITN-TV (Kevin Harlan, Sidney Lowe, Chet Coppock); Prime Sports Upper Midwest (Jerry Schemmel, Sidney Lowe, Robb Leer)
- Radio: WDGY (Kevin Harlan, Jerry Schemmel)

The 1990–91 Minnesota Timberwolves season was the second season for the Minnesota Timberwolves in the National Basketball Association.

== Season summary ==
=== Off-season ===
After finishing their inaugural season with a 22–60 record, the Timberwolves received the sixth overall pick in the 1990 NBA draft, and selected center Felton Spencer from the University of Louisville. During the off-season, the team acquired Scott Brooks from the Philadelphia 76ers. After playing one season at the Hubert H. Humphrey Metrodome, the Timberwolves moved into their new arena known as the Target Center, which opened on October 13, 1990.

=== Regular season ===
The Timberwolves played their first game at the Target Center in their regular season opener on November 2, 1990, defeating the Dallas Mavericks by a score of 98–85, in front of a sellout crowd of 19,006 fans in attendance. Despite the addition of Spencer, the team continued to struggle in their second season, posting a seven-game losing streak in December, and later on holding a 16–29 record at the All-Star break. The Timberwolves won six of their final eight games of the season, and finished in fifth place in the Midwest Division with a 29–53 record, which was a seven-game improvement over their inaugural season.

Tony Campbell averaged 21.8 points and 1.6 steals per game, while Tyrone Corbin averaged 18.0 points, 7.2 rebounds, 4.2 assists and 2.0 steals per game, and second-year star Pooh Richardson provided the team with 17.1 points, 9.0 assists and 1.6 steals per game. In addition, second-year forward Sam Mitchell contributed 14.6 points and 6.3 rebounds per game, while Spencer provided with 7.1 points, 7.9 rebounds and 1.5 blocks per game, and was named to the NBA All-Rookie Second Team. Meanwhile, rookie shooting guard, and first-round draft pick Gerald Glass contributed 6.9 points per game, Randy Breuer averaged 5.9 points, 4.7 blocks and 1.1 blocks per game, Brooks contributed 5.3 points and 2.6 assists per game, and Tod Murphy provided with 4.8 points and 4.9 rebounds per game.

The Timberwolves finished third in the NBA in home-game attendance, with an attendance of 779,530 at the Target Center during the regular season.

=== Aftermath ===
Following the season, head coach Bill Musselman was fired after two seasons with the franchise.

== Draft picks ==
Round	Pick	Player	Position	Nationality	College
1	6	Felton Spencer	C	United States	Louisville
1	20	Gerald Glass	SG/SF	United States	Ole Miss

== Roster ==
1990–91 Minnesota Timberwolves roster
Players

Pos.	No.	Player	Height	Weight	DOB	From
C	45	Randy Breuer	7 ft 3 in (2.21 m)	230 lb (104 kg)	1960–10–11	Minnesota
G	1	Scott Brooks	5 ft 11 in (1.80 m)	165 lb (75 kg)	1965–07–31	UC Irvine
G/F	19	Tony Campbell	6 ft 7 in (2.01 m)	215 lb (98 kg)	1962–05–07	Ohio State
G/F	33	Richard Coffey	6 ft 7 in (2.01 m)	185 lb (84 kg)	1963–11–17	Minnesota
G/F	23	Tyrone Corbin	6 ft 6 in (1.98 m)	210 lb (95 kg)	1962–12–31	DePaul
F	22	Gerald Glass	6 ft 5 in (1.96 m)	221 lb (100 kg)	1967–11–12	Mississippi
C	52	Dan Godfread	6 ft 10 in (2.08 m)	250 lb (113 kg)	1967–06–14	Evansville
F	42	Sam Mitchell	6 ft 6 in (1.98 m)	210 lb (95 kg)	1963–09–02	Mercer
F	4	Tod Murphy	6 ft 9 in (2.06 m)	220 lb (100 kg)	1963–12–24	UC Irvine
G	24	Pooh Richardson	6 ft 1 in (1.85 m)	180 lb (82 kg)	1966–05–14	UCLA
C	50	Felton Spencer	7 ft 0 in (2.13 m)	265 lb (120 kg)	1968–01–15	Louisville
G	20	Jim Thomas	6 ft 3 in (1.91 m)	190 lb (86 kg)	1960–07–10	Indiana
G/F	5	Doug West	6 ft 6 in (1.98 m)	200 lb (91 kg)	1967–05–27	Villanova

Coaches
Head coach
- Bill Musselman
Assistant(s)
- Eric Musselman
- Tom Thibodeau

Legend
- (DP) Unsigned draft pick
- (FA) Free agent
- (S) Suspended
- Injured

== Regular season ==
=== Season standings ===
Midwest Division	W	L	PCT	GB	Home	Road	Div
y-San Antonio Spurs	55	27	.671	—	33–8	22–19	20–8
x-Utah Jazz	54	28	.659	1	36–5	18–23	21-7
x-Houston Rockets	52	30	.634	3	31-10	21–20	20-8
Orlando Magic	31	51	.378	24	24-17	7–34	13–15
Minnesota Timberwolves	29	53	.354	26	21-20	8-33	9-19
Dallas Mavericks	28	54	.341	27	20-21	8–33	7-21
Denver Nuggets	20	62	.244	35	17-24	3-38	8–20

y - clinched division title
x - clinched playoff spot

#	Western Conference				
#	Team	W	L	PCT	GB
1	z-Portland Trail Blazers	63	19	.768	–
2	y-San Antonio Spurs	55	27	.671	8
3	x-Los Angeles Lakers	58	24	.707	5
4	x-Phoenix Suns	55	27	.671	8
5	x-Utah Jazz	54	28	.659	9
6	x-Houston Rockets	52	30	.634	11
7	x-Golden State Warriors	44	38	.537	19
8	x-Seattle SuperSonics	41	41	.500	22
9	Orlando Magic	31	51	.378	32
10	Los Angeles Clippers	31	51	.378	32
11	Minnesota Timberwolves	29	53	.354	34
12	Dallas Mavericks	28	54	.341	35
13	Sacramento Kings	25	57	.305	38
14	Denver Nuggets	20	62	.244	43

z - clinched division title
y - clinched division title
x - clinched playoff spot

== Game log ==
=== Regular season ===
1990–91 game log
Total: 29–53 (Home: 21–20; Road: 8–33)
November: 5–10 (home: 3–3; road: 2–7)

Game	Date	Team	Score	High points	High rebounds	High assists	Location Attendance	Record
2	November 3	@ Milwaukee						
3	November 6	@ Indiana						
4	November 7	Chicago	L 91–96				Target Center	1–3
7	November 13	@ Houston						
9	November 18	Utah	L 94–103				Target Center	3–6
11	November 21	@ San Antonio						
12	November 25	Houston						
14	November 29	@ Portland	L 92–107				Memorial Coliseum	5–9
15	November 30	@ Utah	L 79–96				Salt Palace	5–10

December: 3–9 (home: 3–4; road: 0–5)

Game	Date	Team	Score	High points	High rebounds	High assists	Location Attendance	Record
17	December 4	Indiana						
18	December 6	L.A. Lakers	L 73–83				Target Center	6–12
20	December 13	New York						
21	December 15	San Antonio						
23	December 19	@ Phoenix						
24	December 22	@ Golden State	L 102–115				Oakland–Alameda County Coliseum Arena	7–17
25	December 23	@ L.A. Lakers	L 94–118				Great Western Forum	7–18
26	December 28	Detroit	L 85–97				Target Center	7–19
27	December 30	Seattle						

January: 6–8 (home: 3–4; road: 3–4)

Game	Date	Team	Score	High points	High rebounds	High assists	Location Attendance	Record
30	January 5	@ Atlanta						
31	January 7	Phoenix						
34	January 15	Portland	L 117–132				Target Center	11–23
35	January 16	@ New York						
36	January 19	Golden State	W 121–113				Target Center	13–23
38	January 24	@ Houston						
39	January 26	@ San Antonio						
40	January 28	Boston	L 87–108				Target Center	13–27

February: 4–10 (home: 4–3; road: 0–7)

Game	Date	Team	Score	High points	High rebounds	High assists	Location Attendance	Record
43	February 3	Philadelphia	W 110–102 (2OT)				Target Center	15–28
44	February 5	Utah	W 94–93				Target Center	16–28
46	February 12	@ Golden State	L 105–126				Oakland–Alameda County Coliseum Arena	16–30
47	February 13	@ L.A. Lakers	L 106–120				Great Western Forum	16–31
49	February 16	@ Utah	L 107–115				Salt Palace	16–33
51	February 20	Golden State	L 105–108				Target Center	17–34
53	February 24	Houston						
54	February 27	@ Boston	L 111–116				Boston Garden	18–37

March: 4–11 (home: 3–4; road: 1–7)

Game	Date	Team	Score	High points	High rebounds	High assists	Location Attendance	Record
57	March 5	L.A. Lakers	W 94–85				Target Center	19–38
58	March 7	Seattle						
59	March 10	Phoenix						
60	March 12	@ Chicago	L 99–131				Chicago Stadium	19–41
62	March 15	@ Seattle						
64	March 19	Houston						
67	March 23	@ Utah	L 89–95				Salt Palace	22–45
68	March 26	@ Phoenix						
69	March 29	@ Seattle						
70	March 30	@ Portland	L 91–121				Memorial Coliseum	22–48

April: 5–7 (home: 5–2; road: 0–5)

Game	Date	Team	Score	High points	High rebounds	High assists	Location Attendance	Record
71	April 2	Portland	L 93–104				Target Center	22–49
73	April 5	@ Detroit	L 82–101				The Palace of Auburn Hills	23–50
74	April 7	San Antonio						
76	April 11	Atlanta						
78	April 14	@ Philadelphia	W 96–88				The Spectrum	26–52
81	April 19	Milwaukee						

1990–91 schedule

== Player statistics ==
=== Ragular season ===
Player	POS	GP	GS	MP	REB	AST	STL	BLK	PTS	MPG	RPG	APG	SPG	BPG	PPG
Tyrone Corbin	SF	82	82	3,196	589	347	162	53	1,472	39.0	7.2	4.2	2.0	.6	18.0
Pooh Richardson	PG	82	82	3,154	286	734	131	13	1,401	38.5	3.5	9.0	1.6	.2	17.1
Sam Mitchell	PF	82	60	3,121	520	133	66	57	1,197	38.1	6.3	1.6	.8	.7	14.6
Felton Spencer	C	81	46	2,099	641	25	48	121	572	25.9	7.9	.3	.6	1.5	7.1
Scott Brooks	PG	80	0	980	72	204	53	5	424	12.3	.9	2.6	.7	.1	5.3
Tony Campbell	SG	77	71	2,893	346	214	121	48	1,678	37.6	4.5	2.8	1.6	.6	21.8
Doug West	SG	75	1	824	136	48	35	23	294	11.0	1.8	.6	.5	.3	3.9
Randy Breuer	C	73	44	1,505	345	73	35	80	429	20.6	4.7	1.0	.5	1.1	5.9
Tod Murphy	PF	52	19	1,063	255	60	25	20	251	20.4	4.9	1.2	.5	.4	4.8
Richard Coffey	SF	52	1	320	79	3	6	4	68	6.2	1.5	.1	.1	.1	1.3
Gerald Glass	SF	51	3	606	102	42	28	9	352	11.9	2.0	.8	.5	.2	6.9
Bob Thornton	PF	12	1	110	15	1	0	3	16	9.2	1.3	.1	.0	.3	1.3
Dan Godfread	C	10	0	20	2	0	1	4	13	2.0	.2	.0	.1	.4	1.3
Jim Thomas	SG	3	0	14	0	1	1	0	2	4.7	.0	.3	.3	.0	.7

== Awards and records ==
- Felton Spencer, NBA All-Rookie Team 2nd Team

== See also ==
- 1990-91 NBA season
