= Scott Haffner =

American basketball player (born 1966)

Personal information
- Born: February 2, 1966 (age 60) Terre Haute, Indiana, U. S.
- Listed height: 6 ft 3 in (1.91 m)
- Listed weight: 180 lb (82 kg)

Career information
- High school: Noblesville (Noblesville, Indiana)
- College: Illinois (1984–1985); Evansville (1986–1989)
- NBA draft: 1989: 2nd round, 45th overall pick
- Drafted by: Miami Heat
- Playing career: 1989–1992
- Position: Point guard
- Number: 3, 4

Career history
- 1989–1990: Miami Heat
- 1991: Charlotte Hornets
- 1991–1992: Quad City Thunder

Career highlights
- MCC Player of the Year (1989); First-team All-MCC (1989); Second-team All-MCC (1987); No. 3 jersey retired by Evansville Purple Aces
- Stats at NBA.com
- Stats at Basketball Reference

Scott Richard Haffner (born February 2, 1966) is an American former professional basketball player. Haffner, a 6-foot-3-inch (1.91 m), 180 lb (81 3/4 kg) point guard, played two years in the National Basketball Association (NBA), for the Miami Heat during the 1989–90 season and for the Charlotte Hornets during the 1990–91 season. His best year as a pro came during his rookie year as a member of the Heat, appearing in 43 games (starting six) and averaging 4.6 ppg. Haffner played collegiately at the University of Illinois and the University of Evansville. Haffner graduated from Noblesville High School in Indiana and was selected by the Heat in the second round (45th pick overall) of the 1989 NBA draft.

Haffner holds Evansville's all-time record for single-game scoring, with 65 points in a 109–83 win over Dayton on February 18, 1989. Only 5 other players have scored more in a single Division 1 game. Haffner won Midwestern Collegiate Conference Player of the Year honors in 1988–89, helping to advance the Purple Aces to the second round of the Division I NCAA men's basketball tournament for the only time in its history. The Aces beat Oregon State 94–90 before falling to Seton Hall 87–73.

Haffner was inducted to the Indiana Basketball Hall of Fame in 2013. In addition to scoring 1,686 points in three seasons at Evansville, he led the Noblesville High School team to an undefeated regular season while averaging 28 points per game his senior year. He set the school's career scoring (1,380), assists, and single-game scoring (43) records. He was a 1984 Indiana All-Star.

== See also ==
- List of NCAA Division I men's basketball players with 60 or more points in a game
