= 1989–90 Phoenix Suns season =

NBA team season

- Head coach: Cotton Fitzsimmons
- General manager: Jerry Colangelo
- Owner: Jerry Colangelo
- Arena: Arizona Veterans Memorial Coliseum

Results
- Record: 54–28 (.659)
- Place: Division: 3rd (Pacific); Conference: 5th (Western)
- Playoff finish: Western Conference finals (lost to Trail Blazers 2–4)
- Stats at Basketball Reference

Local media
- Television: KUTP; ASPN
- Radio: KTAR

The 1989–90 Phoenix Suns season was the 21st season for the Phoenix Suns in the National Basketball Association. Cotton Fitzsimmons returned for his second season in his second stint as head coach of the Suns. The team was coming off a defeat to the Los Angeles Lakers in the Western Conference Finals, where they lost in a four-game sweep.

== Season summary ==
=== Regular season ===
The Suns struggled playing below .500 in winning percentage with a 9–12 start to the regular season. In December, the team traded Armen Gilliam to the Charlotte Hornets in exchange for Kurt Rambis, who won four NBA championships with the Los Angeles Lakers. With the addition of Rambis, the Suns posted a 10-game winning streak in January, and later on held a 28–17 record at the All-Star break. The team posted a nine-game winning streak in February, and then posted an eight-game winning streak in March, finishing in third place in the Pacific Division with a 54–28 record, which earned them the fifth seed in the Western Conference.

Tom Chambers averaged 27.2 points and 7.0 rebounds per game, while last season's Most Improved Player, Kevin Johnson averaged 22.5 points, 11.4 assists and 1.3 steals per game, and Jeff Hornacek provided the team with 17.6 points, 5.0 assists and 1.7 steals per game. In addition, and off the bench, sixth man Eddie Johnson provided with 16.9 points per game off the bench, while second-year guard Dan Majerle contributed 11.1 points, 5.9 rebounds and 1.4 steals per game. Meanwhile, Mark West averaged 10.5 points, 8.9 rebounds and 2.2 blocks per game, Rambis contributed 5.4 points and 7.0 rebounds per game in 58 games after the trade, and second-year center Andrew Lang provided with 3.5 points, 3.7 rebounds and 1.8 blocks per game.

During the NBA All-Star weekend at the Miami Arena in Miami, Florida, Chambers and Kevin Johnson were both selected for the 1990 NBA All-Star Game, as members of the Western Conference All-Star team; it was Johnson's first ever All-Star appearance. Meanwhile, rookie shooting guard Kenny Battle participated in the NBA Slam Dunk Contest. Chambers and Kevin Johnson were both named to the All-NBA Second Team at season's end; Chambers also finished in eighth place in Most Valuable Player voting, while Eddie Johnson finished tied in third place in Sixth Man of the Year voting, and Hornacek finished in fourth place in Most Improved Player voting, with West finishing tied in sixth place.

The Suns finished 17th in the NBA in home-game attendance, with an attendance of 578,661 at the Arizona Veterans Memorial Coliseum during the regular season.

=== NBA playoffs ===
In the Western Conference First Round of the 1990 NBA playoffs, the Suns faced off against the 4th–seeded Utah Jazz, who were led by the trio of All-Star forward Karl Malone, All-Star guard John Stockton, and Thurl Bailey. The Suns lost Game 1 to the Jazz on the road, 113–96 at the Salt Palace, but managed to win the next two games to take a 2–1 series lead. The Suns lost Game 4 at home at the Arizona Veterans Memorial Coliseum, 105–94, as the Jazz evened the series. However, the Suns won Game 5 over the Jazz at the Salt Palace, 104–102 to win in a hard-fought five-game series.

In the Western Conference Semi-finals, the team faced off against the top–seeded, and Pacific Division champion Los Angeles Lakers, who were led by the quartet of All-Star guard, and Most Valuable Player of the Year, Magic Johnson, All-Star forward James Worthy, Byron Scott, and All-Star forward A.C. Green. The Suns managed to win Game 1 over the Lakers on the road, 104–102 at the Great Western Forum, before losing Game 2 on the road by a score of 124–100, as the Lakers evened the series. The Suns won their next two home games at the Arizona Veterans Memorial Coliseum, before winning Game 5 over the Lakers at the Great Western Forum, 106–103 to win the series in five games, upsetting the top–seeded team.

In the Western Conference Finals, the Suns then faced off against the 3rd–seeded Portland Trail Blazers, who were led by the quartet of All-Star guard Clyde Drexler, Terry Porter, All-Star center Kevin Duckworth and Jerome Kersey. The Trail Blazers took a 2–0 series lead, but the Suns managed to win the next two games at home, including a Game 4 win over the Trail Blazers at the Arizona Veterans Memorial Coliseum, 119–107 to even the series. However, after losing Game 5 on the road at the Memorial Coliseum, 120–114, the Suns lost Game 6 to the Trail Blazers at the Arizona Veterans Memorial Coliseum, 112–109, thus losing the series in six games.

The Trail Blazers would advance to the NBA Finals, but would lose to the defending NBA champion Detroit Pistons in five games in the 1990 NBA Finals.

=== Notable highlights ===
Two notable highlights for the Suns occurred during the regular season. On February 18, 1990, Chambers set a franchise record for the most points scored in a single game, as he scored 56 points in a 131–113 road win over the Golden State Warriors at the Oakland-Alameda County Coliseum Arena. Just over a month later on March 24, he broke his own record when he scored 60 points in a home game against his former team, the Seattle SuperSonics; the Suns defeated the SuperSonics by a score of 121–95 at the Arizona Veterans Memorial Coliseum.

Chambers' record would later on be broken by Devin Booker on March 24th, 2017 by scoring 70 points against the Boston Celtics, and technically a second time on January 26th, 2024 against the Indiana Pacers with 62 points.

== NBA draft ==
| Round | Pick | Player | Position | Nationality | College |
|---|---|---|---|---|---|
| 1 | 24 | Anthony Cook | Forward | United States | Arizona |
| 2 | 46 | Ricky Blanton | Forward | United States | Louisiana State |
| 2 | 51 | Mike Morrison | Guard | United States | Loyola (MD) |
| 2 | 52 | Greg Grant | Guard | United States | Trenton State |

The Suns traded first-round pick Anthony Cook on draft night to the Detroit Pistons for 27th pick Kenny Battle and Micheal Williams. Battle played for a season and a half before being waived in January 1991. Micheal Williams would play six games for the Suns before being waived. The Suns received the 46th pick (Ricky Blanton) from the Chicago Bulls when they traded Craig Hodges for Ed Nealy. Blanton, after knee surgery, sat on the bench for the 89–90 season, and was waived shortly after the start of the 90–91 season. Mike Morrison played sparingly in the 89–90 season, and was traded before the start of the 90–91 season. Greg Grant played the season as a backup to Kevin Johnson, before being released in the 1990 offseason.

== Roster ==
1989–90 Phoenix Suns roster
Players

| Pos. | No. | Player | Height | Weight | DOB | From |
|---|---|---|---|---|---|---|
| G | 3 | Kenny Battle | 6 ft 6 in (1.98 m) | 210 lb (95 kg) | 1964–10–10 | Illinois |
| F | 24 | Tom Chambers | 6 ft 10 in (2.08 m) | 220 lb (100 kg) | 1959–06–21 | Utah |
| G | 10 | Greg Grant | 5 ft 7 in (1.70 m) | 140 lb (64 kg) | 1966–08–29 | TCNJ |
| G | 14 | Jeff Hornacek | 6 ft 3 in (1.91 m) | 190 lb (86 kg) | 1963–05–03 | Iowa State |
| F | 8 | Eddie Johnson | 6 ft 7 in (2.01 m) | 215 lb (98 kg) | 1959–05–01 | Illinois |
| G | 7 | Kevin Johnson | 6 ft 1 in (1.85 m) | 180 lb (82 kg) | 1966–03–04 | California |
| C | 28 | Andrew Lang | 6 ft 11 in (2.11 m) | 245 lb (111 kg) | 1966–06–28 | Arkansas |
| G | 9 | Dan Majerle | 6 ft 6 in (1.98 m) | 215 lb (98 kg) | 1965–09–09 | Central Michigan |
| F | 40 | Mike McGee | 6 ft 5 in (1.96 m) | 190 lb (86 kg) | 1959–07–29 | Michigan |
| G | 32 | Mike Morrison | 6 ft 4 in (1.93 m) | 195 lb (88 kg) | 1967–08–16 | Loyola (MD) |
| C | 34 | Tim Perry | 6 ft 9 in (2.06 m) | 200 lb (91 kg) | 1965–06–04 | Temple |
| F | 31 | Kurt Rambis | 6 ft 8 in (2.03 m) | 213 lb (97 kg) | 1958–02–25 | Santa Clara |
| C | 41 | Mark West | 6 ft 10 in (2.08 m) | 230 lb (104 kg) | 1960–11–05 | Old Dominion |

Coaches
Head coach
- Cotton Fitzsimmons
Assistant(s)
- Lionel Hollins
- Scotty Robertson
- Paul Westphal

Legend
- (DP) Unsigned draft pick
- (FA) Free agent
- (S) Suspended
- Injured

Roster
Updated: March 26, 1990

== Regular season ==
=== Standings ===
| Pacific Division | W | L | PCT | GB | Home | Road | Div |
|---|---|---|---|---|---|---|---|
| y-Los Angeles Lakers | 63 | 19 | .768 | – | 37–4 | 26–15 | 22–6 |
| x-Portland Trail Blazers | 59 | 23 | .720 | 4 | 35–6 | 24–17 | 20–8 |
| x-Phoenix Suns | 54 | 28 | .659 | 9 | 32–9 | 22–19 | 20–8 |
| Seattle SuperSonics | 41 | 41 | .500 | 22 | 30–11 | 11–30 | 11–17 |
| Golden State Warriors | 37 | 45 | .451 | 26 | 27–14 | 10–31 | 11–17 |
| Los Angeles Clippers | 30 | 52 | .366 | 33 | 20–21 | 10–31 | 7–21 |
| Sacramento Kings | 23 | 59 | .280 | 40 | 16–25 | 7–34 | 7–21 |

| # | Western Conference | | | | |
| # | Team | W | L | PCT | GB |
|---|---|---|---|---|---|
| 1 | z-Los Angeles Lakers | 63 | 19 | .768 | – |
| 2 | y-San Antonio Spurs | 56 | 26 | .683 | 7 |
| 3 | x-Portland Trail Blazers | 59 | 23 | .720 | 4 |
| 4 | x-Utah Jazz | 55 | 27 | .671 | 8 |
| 5 | x-Phoenix Suns | 54 | 28 | .659 | 9 |
| 6 | x-Dallas Mavericks | 47 | 35 | .573 | 16 |
| 7 | x-Denver Nuggets | 43 | 39 | .524 | 20 |
| 8 | x-Houston Rockets | 41 | 41 | .500 | 22 |
| 9 | Seattle SuperSonics | 41 | 41 | .500 | 22 |
| 10 | Golden State Warriors | 37 | 45 | .451 | 26 |
| 11 | Los Angeles Clippers | 30 | 52 | .366 | 33 |
| 12 | Sacramento Kings | 23 | 59 | .280 | 40 |
| 13 | Minnesota Timberwolves | 22 | 60 | .268 | 41 |
| 14 | Charlotte Hornets | 19 | 63 | .232 | 44 |

== Playoffs ==
The Suns entered the postseason as the fifth seed in the Western Conference, opening the playoffs against the fourth-seeded Utah Jazz. With stomach flu limiting All-Star point guard Kevin Johnson to only 9 minutes, the Jazz took game one with a 17-point victory in Salt Lake City. Johnson returned for game two, leading the Suns to an 18-point victory. After splitting two games in Phoenix, the Suns headed back to Salt Lake for the decisive fifth game. Kevin Johnson sealed the game with a last-second jump shot to give the Suns a 104–102 victory.

The Suns would next face-off against the top-seeded Los Angeles Lakers, who finished the season with a league-best 63–19 record. Coach Cotton Fitzsimmons came into game one with an 0–37 record coaching against the Lakers at the Great Western Forum. The Suns had lost 21 consecutive games at the Forum dating back to 1984. They ended the streak with a 104–102 upset, stealing homecourt advantage. Center Mark West led the Suns with 24 points, 16 rebounds and 7 blocks. The Lakers would recover in game two, blowing out the Suns 100–124 to even the series. After winning games three and four in Phoenix, the Suns returned to the Forum with a 3–1 series lead. Despite an early 15-point lead and a 43-point performance from MVP Magic Johnson, the Suns rallied to a 106–103 victory, behind 37 points from Kevin Johnson.

The Suns headed to the Western Conference finals to face the Portland Trail Blazers. Looking to steal homecourt advantage for the third straight series, the Suns fell 98–100 in a closely contested game one. A last second shot from reserve shooting guard Mike McGee was blocked by Blazers guard Danny Young. Game two saw the Suns run to a 22-point lead in the second quarter, finishing the first half leading 59–41. The Blazers launched a furious second-half comeback, tying the game 106–106 after a Terry Porter three-pointer with 28 seconds left. Kevin Johnson was immediately fouled, missing the first free throw and making the second to give the Suns a one-point lead. Porter would give the Blazers the lead after a 14-foot jump shot with 12 seconds left. Suns forward Eddie Johnson missed a 20-foot jumper with 4 seconds left, giving the Blazers a 108–107 victory. The Suns would beat the Blazers by 34 and 12 in games three and four in Phoenix, before the Blazers retook the series lead with a 6-point victory in game five. Fortune turned against the Suns in game six, when Kevin Johnson went down with a hamstring injury at the end of the second quarter. Shooting guard Jeff Hornacek led the team in Johnson's absence, scoring a career playoff high 36 points. The Suns led 109–108 with 55 seconds left in the game. Blazers forward Jerome Kersey blocked a shot by Hornacek and scored a fast-break layup, giving the Blazers a 110–109 lead with 27 seconds left. Looking to regain the lead, Suns forward Tom Chambers had the ball stripped by Buck Williams. Star Clyde Drexler would make two free-throws to put the Blazers up 112–109. Hornacek missed a last-second three-pointer, ending the Suns unlikely playoff run.

=== Game log ===
1990 playoff game log
First Round: 3–2 (home: 1–1; road: 2–1)

| Game | Date | Team | Score | High points | High rebounds | High assists | Location Attendance | Series |
|---|---|---|---|---|---|---|---|---|
| 1 | April 27 | @ Utah | L 96–113 | Dan Majerle (23) | Kurt Rambis (9) | Jeff Hornacek (6) | Salt Palace; 12,616 | 0–1 |
| 2 | April 29 | @ Utah | W 105–87 | Kevin Johnson (22) | Mark West (21) | Kevin Johnson (7) | Salt Palace; 12,616 | 1–1 |
| 3 | May 2 | Utah | W 120–105 | Kevin Johnson (29) | Mark West (10) | Kevin Johnson (12) | Arizona Veterans Memorial Coliseum; 14,487 | 2–1 |
| 4 | May 4 | Utah | L 94–105 | Eddie Johnson (33) | Mark West (11) | Kevin Johnson (13) | Arizona Veterans Memorial Coliseum; 14,487 | 2–2 |
| 5 | May 6 | @ Utah | W 104–102 | Tom Chambers (32) | Mark West (11) | Kevin Johnson (9) | Salt Palace; 12,616 | 3–2 |

Conference semifinals: 4–1 (home: 2–0; road: 2–1)

| Game | Date | Team | Score | High points | High rebounds | High assists | Location Attendance | Series |
|---|---|---|---|---|---|---|---|---|
| 1 | May 8 | @ L.A. Lakers | W 104–102 | Tom Chambers (26) | Mark West (16) | Kevin Johnson (12) | Great Western Forum; 17,505 | 1–0 |
| 2 | May 10 | @ L.A. Lakers | L 100–124 | Jeff Hornacek (18) | five players tied (5) | Kevin Johnson (12) | Great Western Forum; 17,505 | 1–1 |
| 3 | May 12 | L.A. Lakers | W 117–103 | Tom Chambers (34) | Chambers, K. Johnson (7) | Kevin Johnson (8) | Arizona Veterans Memorial Coliseum; 14,487 | 2–1 |
| 4 | May 13 | L.A. Lakers | W 114–101 | Kevin Johnson (30) | Mark West (15) | Kevin Johnson (16) | Arizona Veterans Memorial Coliseum; 14,487 | 3–1 |
| 5 | May 15 | @ L.A. Lakers | W 106–103 | Kevin Johnson (37) | Mark West (16) | Kevin Johnson (8) | Great Western Forum; 17,505 | 4–1 |

Conference finals: 2–4 (home: 2–1; road: 0–3)

| Game | Date | Team | Score | High points | High rebounds | High assists | Location Attendance | Series |
|---|---|---|---|---|---|---|---|---|
| 1 | May 21 | @ Portland | L 98–100 | Tom Chambers (29) | Mark West (12) | Kevin Johnson (11) | Memorial Coliseum; 12,884 | 0–1 |
| 2 | May 23 | @ Portland | L 107–108 | Tom Chambers (28) | Tom Chambers (14) | Kevin Johnson (8) | Memorial Coliseum; 12,884 | 0–2 |
| 3 | May 25 | Portland | W 123–89 | Tom Chambers (24) | Andrew Lang (10) | Kevin Johnson (12) | Arizona Veterans Memorial Coliseum; 14,487 | 1–2 |
| 4 | May 27 | Portland | W 119–107 | Kevin Johnson (28) | Mark West (12) | Kevin Johnson (17) | Arizona Veterans Memorial Coliseum; 14,487 | 2–2 |
| 5 | May 29 | @ Portland | L 114–120 | Kevin Johnson (28) | Tom Chambers (13) | Kevin Johnson (14) | Memorial Coliseum; 12,884 | 2–3 |
| 6 | May 31 | Portland | L 109–112 | Jeff Hornacek (36) | Kurt Rambis (12) | Hornacek, K. Johnson (6) | Arizona Veterans Memorial Coliseum; 14,487 | 2–4 |

1990 schedule

== Player statistics ==
Legend
| GP | Games played | GS | Games started | MPG | Minutes per game |
| FG% | Field-goal percentage | 3P% | 3-point field-goal percentage | FT% | Free-throw percentage |
| RPG | Rebounds per game | APG | Assists per game | SPG | Steals per game |
| BPG | Blocks per game | PPG | Points per game |

=== Season ===
| Player | GP | GS | MPG | FG% | 3P% | FT% | RPG | APG | SPG | BPG | PPG |
|---|---|---|---|---|---|---|---|---|---|---|---|
| Kenny Battle | 59 | 8 | 12.4 | .547 | .250 | .671 | 2.1 | 0.6 | .6 | .2 | 4.1 |
| Tom Chambers | 81 | 81 | 37.6 | .501 | .279 | .861 | 7.0 | 2.3 | 1.1 | .6 | 27.2 |
| Armon Gilliam* | 16 | 7 | 16.7 | .430 | . | .696 | 4.4 | 0.5 | .4 | .3 | 8.9 |
| Greg Grant | 67 | 3 | 10.1 | .384 | .188 | .661 | 0.9 | 2.5 | .5 | .0 | 3.1 |
| Jeff Hornacek | 67 | 60 | 34.0 | .536 | .408† | .856 | 4.7 | 5.0 | 1.7 | .2 | 17.6 |
| Eddie Johnson | 64 | 4 | 28.3 | .453 | .380 | .917^ | 3.8 | 1.7 | .5 | .2 | 16.9 |
| Kevin Johnson | 74 | 74 | 37.6 | .499 | .195 | .838 | 3.6 | 11.4 | 1.3 | .2 | 22.5 |
| Andrew Lang | 74 | 0 | 13.7 | .557 | . | .653 | 3.7 | 0.3 | .3 | 1.8 | 3.5 |
| Tim Legler | 11 | 0 | 7.5 | .379 | .000 | 1.000^ | 0.7 | 0.5 | .2 | .0 | 2.5 |
| Dan Majerle | 73 | 23 | 30.7 | .424 | .238 | .762 | 5.9 | 2.6 | 1.4 | .4 | 11.1 |
| Mike McGee | 14 | 7 | 20.0 | .483 | .348 | .476 | 2.6 | 1.1 | .6 | .1 | 7.3 |
| Mike Morrison | 36 | 1 | 4.3 | .338 | .286 | .800 | 0.6 | 0.3 | .1 | .0 | 2.0 |
| Tim Perry | 60 | 18 | 10.2 | .513 | 1.000† | .589 | 2.5 | 0.3 | .4 | .4 | 4.2 |
| Kurt Rambis* | 58 | 45 | 25.1 | .514 | .000 | .722 | 7.0 | 1.8 | 1.2 | .5 | 5.4 |
| Mark West | 82 | 79 | 29.3 | .625 | . | .691 | 8.9 | 0.5 | .4 | 2.2 | 10.5 |
| Micheal Williams* | 6 | 0 | 4.3 | .200 | . | .500 | 0.2 | 0.7 | .0 | .0 | 0.8 |

* – Stats with the Suns.
† – Minimum 25 three-pointers made.
^ – Minimum 125 free throws made.

=== Playoffs ===
| Player | GP | GS | MPG | FG% | 3P% | FT% | RPG | APG | SPG | BPG | PPG |
|---|---|---|---|---|---|---|---|---|---|---|---|
| Kenny Battle | 8 | | 4.3 | .308 | . | 1.000 | 0.6 | 0.0 | .0 | .0 | 1.1 |
| Tom Chambers | 16 | | 38.3 | .425 | .263 | .879 | 6.7 | 1.9 | .4 | .4 | 22.2 |
| Greg Grant | 7 | | 6.7 | .450 | .333 | . | 0.9 | 1.4 | .3 | .0 | 1.4 |
| Jeff Hornacek | 16 | | 36.4 | .511 | .250 | .932 | 3.9 | 4.6 | 1.5 | .0 | 18.6 |
| Eddie Johnson | 16 | | 21.1 | .450 | .395 | .787 | 3.6 | 1.1 | .6 | .2 | 12.3 |
| Kevin Johnson | 16 | | 36.4 | .479 | .182 | .821 | 3.3 | 10.6 | 1.6 | .0 | 21.3 |
| Andrew Lang | 12 | | 7.8 | .667 | . | .571 | 1.7 | 0.2 | .2 | .8 | 1.3 |
| Dan Majerle | 16 | | 29.9 | .487 | .333 | .785 | 5.1 | 2.1 | 1.2 | .1 | 12.6 |
| Mike McGee | 10 | | 4.4 | .350 | .429 | .250 | 0.4 | 0.2 | .1 | .1 | 1.8 |
| Tim Perry | 11 | | 9.1 | .520 | . | .444 | 1.9 | 0.2 | .3 | .5 | 3.1 |
| Kurt Rambis | 16 | | 24.1 | .444 | .000 | .679 | 7.7 | 1.4 | .5 | .5 | 4.2 |
| Mark West | 16 | | 34.0 | .577 | . | .540 | 10.3 | 0.3 | .2 | 2.6 | 11.1 |

Player statistics citation:

== Awards and honors ==
=== Week/Month ===
- Tom Chambers was named Player of the Week for games played February 5 through February 18.
- Kevin Johnson was named Player of the Week for games played March 12 through March 18.

=== All-Star ===
- Tom Chambers was selected as a reserve for the Western Conference in the All-Star Game. Chambers finished 9th in voting among Western Conference forwards with 64,028 votes.
- Kevin Johnson was selected as a reserve for the Western Conference in the All-Star Game. Johnson finished 6th in voting among Western Conference guards with 78,812 votes.

=== Season ===
- Tom Chambers was named to the All-NBA Second Team. Chambers finished 8th in MVP voting.
- Kevin Johnson was named to the All-NBA Second Team.
- Eddie Johnson finished 3rd in Sixth Man of the Year voting. He won the award the previous year in the 1988–89 season.
- Mark West led the league in field goal percentage, making .625% of his shots.

== Transactions ==
=== Trades ===
| June 27, 1989 | To Detroit Pistons (United States) Anthony Cook | To Phoenix Suns (United States) Kenny Battle (United States) Micheal Williams |
| September 5, 1989 | To Cleveland Cavaliers (United States) Steve Kerr | To Phoenix Suns 1993 second-round draft pick ( (United States) Mark Buford) |
| October 5, 1989 | To Chicago Bulls (United States) Ed Nealy | To Phoenix Suns 1996 second-round draft pick |
| December 13, 1989 | To Charlotte Hornets (United States) Armen Gilliam | To Phoenix Suns (United States) Kurt Rambis 1990 second-round draft pick ( (United States) Negele Knight) 1991 second-round draft pick ( (United States) Chad Gallagher) |

=== Free agents ===
==== Additions ====
| Date | Player | Contract | Former Team |
|---|---|---|---|
| August 24, 1989 | Steve Kerr | Undisclosed | Phoenix Suns |
| March 21, 1990 | Tim Legler | Signed two ten-day contracts | Omaha Racers |
| March 26, 1990 | Mike McGee | Signed for rest of season | New Jersey Nets |

==== Subtractions ====
| Date | Player | Reason left | New team |
|---|---|---|---|
| June 15, 1989 | Tyrone Corbin | Expansion draft | Minnesota Timberwolves |
| September 21, 1989 | Kenny Gattison | Waived | Charlotte Hornets |
| November 6, 1989 | T. R. Dunn | Free agent | Denver Nuggets |
| December 12, 1989 | Micheal Williams | Waived | Charlotte Hornets |
| April 10, 1990 | Tim Legler | Ten-day contract expired | Denver Nuggets |

Player Transactions Citation:
