= Jerry Sichting =

American basketball player and coach

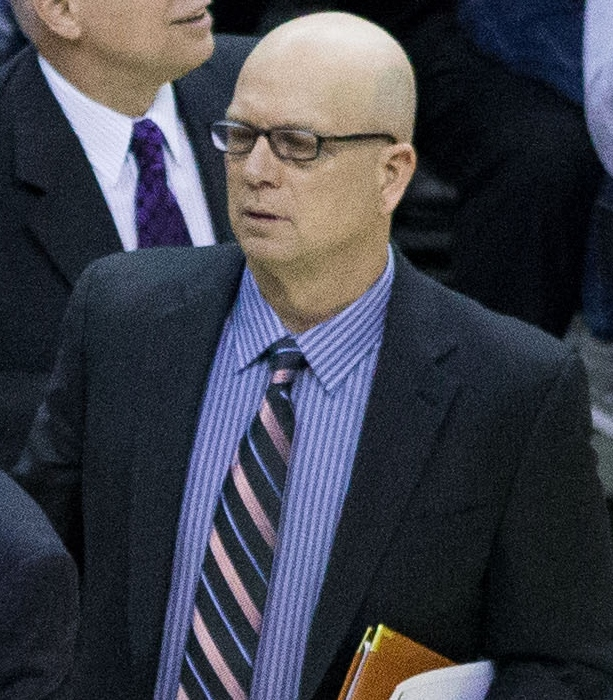
- Sichting in 2013 as Washington Wizards assistant coach

Personal information
- Born: November 29, 1956 (age 69) Martinsville, Indiana, U.S.
- Listed height: 6 ft 1 in (1.85 m)
- Listed weight: 168 lb (76 kg)

Career information
- High school: Martinsville (Martinsville, Indiana)
- College: Purdue (1975–1979)
- NBA draft: 1979: 4th round, 82nd overall pick
- Drafted by: Golden State Warriors
- Playing career: 1980–1990
- Position: Point guard
- Number: 14, 12
- Coaching career: 1995–2019

Career history

Playing
- 1979-1980: Maine Lumberjacks
- 1980–1985: Indiana Pacers
- 1985–1988: Boston Celtics
- 1988–1989: Portland Trail Blazers
- 1989–1990: Charlotte Hornets
- 1990: Milwaukee Bucks

Coaching
- 1995–2005: Minnesota Timberwolves (assistant)
- 2005–2008: Marquette (assistant)
- 2008–2010: Minnesota Timberwolves (assistant)
- 2010–2011: Golden State Warriors (assistant)
- 2012–2013: Washington Wizards (assistant)
- 2013–2015: Phoenix Suns (assistant)
- 2016–2018: New York Knicks (assistant)
- 2019: Minnesota Timberwolves (assistant)

Career highlights
- NBA champion (1986)

Career statistics
- Points: 4,141 (6.9 ppg)
- Rebounds: 817 (1.4 rpg)
- Assists: 1,962 (3.3 apg)
- Stats at NBA.com
- Stats at Basketball Reference

Jerry Lee Sichting (born November 29, 1956) is an American basketball coach and retired player of the National Basketball Association (NBA).

== High school career ==
Jerry Sichting, the 6-foot-1-inch (185 cm), 175 lb (79 kg) point guard from Martinsville, Indiana, attended Martinsville High School. In his junior year, he led the Artesians to an IHSAA Sectional title. He had an excellent senior season, leading his school to a 21–2 record and another IHSAA Sectional title; he averaged 21 points, while shooting 53 percent from the field and 83 percent at the line in three seasons. Chosen as a 1975 Indiana All-Star, the team toured Europe and Russia.

He also played football at the quarterback position, leading his team to an undefeated 10–0 season in 1974. He earned a total of 10 letters in basketball, football and baseball.

On February 14, 2012, Sichting volunteered to be the interim coach for the Martinsville High School varsity boys' basketball team after head coach Timothy Wolf retired.

== College career ==
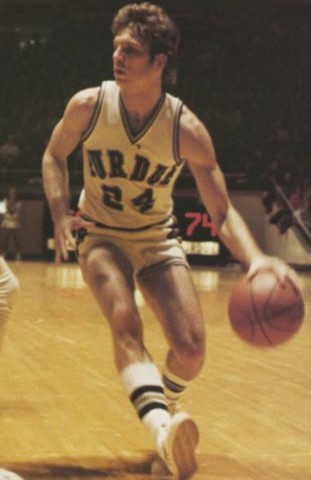
Sichting at Purdue

After playing basketball at Martinsville High School under head coach Sam Alford, Jerry attended Purdue University, located in West Lafayette, Indiana, to play for head coach Fred Schaus. In his freshman season, Jerry boasted a 54.5 field goal and 81.6 free throw percentage. Playing under Lee Rose during his senior season and alongside All-American Joe Barry Carroll, he helped lead the Boilermakers to a Big Ten Conference title tie with the Earvin Johnson-led Michigan State team. After losing the spot to be invited to the NCAA tournament, Sichting led the Boilers to an NIT Finals appearance, losing to in-state conference rival, Indiana. Named a First Team All-Big Ten selection his senior year, he currently holds the school career free-throw percentage record with a .867 accuracy. He also left Purdue with the school record for consecutive free throws made with 34, which was broken three decades later by Robbie Hummel's 36.

=== College statistics ===
Year	Team	GP	GS	MPG	FG%	3P%	FT%	RPG	APG	SPG	BPG	PPG
1975–76	Purdue	27	0	16.1	.545	-	.816	1.6	2.3	-	-	6.1
1976–77	Purdue	28	0	19.1	.542	-	.884	1.3	2.1	0.6	0.0	7.3
1977–78	Purdue	27	27	36.1	.515	-	.867	3.2	6.8	1.5	0.0	15.1
1978–79	Purdue	35	35	34.3	.507	-	.873	2.8	3.5	1.9	0.1	13.6
Career		117	62	28.4	.520	-	.867	2.2	3.5	1.0	0.0	10.5

== Professional career ==
=== Indiana Pacers ===
Sichting was selected in the fourth round of the 1979 NBA draft by the Golden State Warriors, although he did not play a game for the Warriors; after being waived, he spent time as a member of the CBA's Maine Lumberjacks. He was signed for the 1980–81 NBA season by the Indiana Pacers, after completing their free-agent training camp; he spent five seasons with the Pacers. His best season in his career came in 1983–84, where he averaged 11.5 points, 2.1 rebounds, and 5.7 assists a game, while holding a .532 field goal percentage.

=== Boston Celtics ===
After five seasons with the Pacers, Sichting was traded to the Boston Celtics to start the 1985–86 season. Sichting and fellow Indiana native Larry Bird were the only two Celtics players that season to play in all 82 games. Sichting became a role player off the bench for the Celtics' 1986 NBA championship team. He is known for being involved in a fight with Houston Rockets center Ralph Sampson during Game 5 of the 1986 NBA Finals, resulting in Sampson's ejection.

=== Portland Trail Blazers, Charlotte Hornets, Milwaukee Bucks ===
Sichting played on the Portland Trail Blazers during the 1988–89 season and then was traded to the Charlotte Hornets for his last full season. He retired in 1990 after playing one game with the Milwaukee Bucks.

== NBA career statistics ==
Legend
GP	Games played	GS	Games started	MPG	Minutes per game
FG%	Field goal percentage	3P%	3-point field goal percentage	FT%	Free throw percentage
RPG	Rebounds per game	APG	Assists per game	SPG	Steals per game
BPG	Blocks per game	PPG	Points per game	**Bold**	Career high
†	Won an NBA championship	*	Led the league

=== Regular season ===
Year	Team	GP	GS	MPG	FG%	3P%	FT%	RPG	APG	SPG	BPG	PPG
1980–81	Indiana	47	-	9.6	.358	.000	.781	0.9	1.5	0.5	0.0	2.0
1981–82	Indiana	51	0	15.7	.469	.111	.763	1.1	2.3	0.6	0.0	4.2
1982–83	Indiana	78	58	**31.2**	.478	.167	.860	2.0	5.6	**1.3**	0.0	9.3
1983–84	Indiana	80	**80**	**31.2**	.532	.300	.867	**2.1**	**5.7**	1.1	**0.1**	**11.5**
1984–85	Indiana	70	25	25.8	.521	.243	.875	1.6	3.8	0.7	**0.1**	11.0
1985–86†	Boston	**82**	7	19.5	**.570**	.375	**.924**	1.3	2.3	0.6	0.0	6.5
1986–87	Boston	78	15	20.1	.508	.269	.881	1.2	2.4	0.5	0.0	5.7
1987–88	Boston	24	1	15.4	.537	.250	.667	0.9	2.5	0.6	0.0	4.1
1987–88	Portland	28	0	11.6	.544	**.571**	.818	0.5	1.2	0.3	0.0	4.1
1988–89	Portland	25	1	15.6	.442	.250	.875	1.2	2.4	0.6	0.0	4.1
1989–90	Charlotte	34	8	13.8	.420	.250	.833	0.6	2.7	0.5	**0.1**	3.5
1989–90	Milwaukee	1	0	27.0	.000	.000	.750	0.0	2.0	0.0	0.0	3.0
Career		598	195	21.3	.507	.271	.857	1.4	3.3	0.7	0.0	6.9

=== Playoffs ===
Year	Team	GP	GS	MPG	FG%	3P%	FT%	RPG	APG	SPG	BPG	PPG
1981	Indiana	1	-	1.0	.000	.000	.000	0.0	0.0	**1.0**	0.0	0.0
1986†	Boston	18	0	**15.2**	**.443**	.000	.429	0.9	**2.2**	0.3	0.0	3.2
1987	Boston	**23***	**4**	14.7	.427	**.167**	**.800**	0.9	1.4	0.4	0.0	**3.4**
1988	Portland	4	0	7.8	.286	.000	.000	0.5	1.3	0.3	0.0	1.0
1989	Portland	1	0	11.0	.000	.000	.000	**1.0**	1.0	0.0	0.0	0.0
Career		47	4	13.9	.418	.143	.647	0.8	1.7	0.3	0.0	3.0

== Broadcasting career ==
After Sichting retired, he returned to Boston, Massachusetts, where he ran his Jerry Sichting Basketball Camp for five years and served as a Boston Celtics analyst on radio broadcasts. He also did broadcasts for pregame shows for his alma mater, Purdue University, and various Indiana high school games as well as a fill-in for Bobby Leonard on the Pacers' television broadcasts alongside Jerry Baker.

== Coaching career ==
=== Minnesota Timberwolves ===
In 1995, Sichting became the Minnesota Timberwolves' director of scouting and development. During that year he also became an assistant on the Wolves' bench, a position he held until the 2004–05 season. He returned to Minnesota as an assistant once again under head coach and former Celtics teammate Kevin McHale for the 2008–09 and 2009–10 seasons.

=== Marquette ===
Jerry Sichting served as an assistant coach at Marquette University, located in Milwaukee, Wisconsin. For the three seasons he assisted under head coach Tom Crean, where he helped the Golden Eagles to three consecutive NCAA tournament appearances.

=== Golden State Warriors ===
On September 27, 2010, Sichting was hired by the Golden State Warriors as an assistant coach to Keith Smart.

=== Martinsville High School ===
On February 14, 2012, Sichting was hired by the Martinsville High School Artesians as head coach of the boys' varsity team, after their coach abruptly resigned. His record as the Artesians head coach was 4–1, they finished their season with a loss in the IHSAA Sectional.

=== Washington Wizards ===
In August 2012, Sichting became an assistant coach with the Washington Wizards.

=== Phoenix Suns ===
After a year of being an assistant coach for the Wizards, Sichting decided to be an assistant coach for the Phoenix Suns under their newest head coach, Jeff Hornacek. He was also joined under the job by Mike Longabardi, Kenny Gattison, and Mark West during their first two seasons.

=== New York Knicks ===
After waiting for close to nine months since being fired from the Suns midway through the 2015–16 season, Sichting would reunite with coach Jeff Hornacek on his new coaching staff with the New York Knicks, which includes former Knicks head coach Kurt Rambis, Corey Gaines (another assistant coach from the Suns he used to work with), Howard Eisley, and Joshua Longstaff.

=== Return to Minnesota Timberwolves ===
On January 18, 2019, the Timberwolves hired Sichting as their assistant coach.

== Personal life ==
Sichting is a member of the Beta Mu chapter of the Beta Theta Pi fraternity at Purdue University.

Everyone in Sichting's family has a name starting with the letter J, including Jerry himself, his wife Joni, his three sons Jared, Jason and Jordan and his daughter Jenna. His son Jared was a walk-on on the Marquette University basketball team that reached the Final Four in 2003.
