= 1988–89 Phoenix Suns season =

NBA team season

- Head coach: Cotton Fitzsimmons
- General manager: Jerry Colangelo
- Owner: Jerry Colangelo
- Arena: Arizona Veterans Memorial Coliseum

Results
- Record: 55–27 (.671)
- Place: Division: 2nd (Pacific); Conference: 3rd (Western)
- Playoff finish: Western Conference finals (lost to Lakers 0–4)
- Stats at Basketball Reference

Local media
- Television: KUTP; ASPN
- Radio: KTAR (Al McCoy)

The 1988–89 Phoenix Suns season was the 20th season for the Phoenix Suns in the National Basketball Association.

== Season summary ==
=== Off-season ===
The Suns received the seventh overall pick in the 1988 NBA draft, and selected power forward Tim Perry out of Temple University, and also selected shooting guard Dan Majerle from the University of Central Michigan with the 14th overall pick. During the off-season, the Suns fired head coach John Wetzel, and replaced him with director of player personnel (and former head coach) Cotton Fitzsimmons, who coached the team for the '70–'71 and '71–'72 seasons, and signed free agent and one-time All-Star forward Tom Chambers.

=== Regular season ===
Under Fitzsimmons, and with the addition of Chambers and Majerle, the Suns lost six of their first ten games of the regular season, but then won 16 of their next 21 games, and later on held a 29–17 record at the All-Star break. The team posted a nine-game winning streak between March and April, and won 18 of their final 22 games of the season. The Suns finished in second place in the Pacific Division with a 55–27 record, which earned them the third seed in the Western Conference. Fitzsimmons was named the NBA Coach of the Year, after leading the Suns to a 27-game improvement over the previous season.

Three members of the team averaged 20 or more points per game; Chambers averaged 25.7 points and 8.4 rebounds per game, while sixth man Eddie Johnson averaged 21.5 points per game off the bench, and was named the NBA Sixth Man of the Year, and second-year guard Kevin Johnson provided the team with 20.4 points, 12.2 assists and 1.7 steals per game, and was named the NBA Most Improved Player of the Year. In addition, second-year forward Armen Gilliam provided with 15.9 points and 7.3 rebounds per game, while Jeff Hornacek contributed 13.5 points, 6.0 assists and 1.7 steals per game, and Majerle contributed 8.6 points per game in only 54 games. Meanwhile, Tyrone Corbin averaged 8.2 points and 5.2 rebounds per game, and Mark West provided with 7.2 points, 6.7 rebounds and 2.3 blocks per game.

During the NBA All-Star weekend at the Houston Astrodome in Houston, Texas, Chambers was selected for the 1989 NBA All-Star Game, as a member of the Western Conference All-Star team, while Perry participated in the NBA Slam Dunk Contest. Chambers and Kevin Johnson were both named to the All-NBA Second Team, while Kevin Johnson finished in eighth place in Most Valuable Player voting, and with Chambers finishing in ninth place.

The Suns finished 20th in the NBA in home-game attendance, with an attendance of 447,061 at the Arizona Veterans Memorial Coliseum during the regular season.

=== NBA playoffs ===
In the Western Conference First Round of the 1989 NBA playoffs, the Suns faced off against the 6th–seeded Denver Nuggets, a team that featured All-Star forward Alex English, All-Star guard Fat Lever, and Michael Adams. The Suns won the first two games over the Nuggets at home at the Arizona Veterans Memorial Coliseum, before winning Game 3 on the road, 130–121 at the McNichols Sports Arena to win the series in a three-game sweep.

In the Western Conference Semi-finals, the team faced off against the 7th–seeded Golden State Warriors, a team that featured All-Star forward Chris Mullin, Rookie of the Year, Mitch Richmond, and Terry Teagle. With the series tied at 1–1, the Suns won the next two games on the road at the Oakland-Alameda County Coliseum Arena, before winning Game 5 over the Warriors at home, 116–104 at the Arizona Veterans Memorial Coliseum to win the series in five games.

In the Western Conference Finals, the Suns then faced off against the top–seeded, and 2-time defending NBA champion Los Angeles Lakers, who won the Pacific Division title; the team was led by the quartet of All-Star guard, and Most Valuable Player of the Year, Magic Johnson, All-Star forward James Worthy, Byron Scott, and All-Star center Kareem Abdul-Jabbar. The Suns lost the first two games to the Lakers on the road at the Great Western Forum, and then lost the next two games at home, including a Game 4 loss to the Lakers at the Arizona Veterans Memorial Coliseum, 122–117, thus losing the series in a four-game sweep.

The Lakers would advance to the NBA Finals for the third consecutive year, but would lose to the Detroit Pistons in a four-game sweep in the 1989 NBA Finals.

=== Aftermath ===
Following the season, Corbin was left unprotected in the 1989 NBA expansion draft, where he was selected by the Minnesota Timberwolves expansion team.

== NBA draft ==
Round	Pick	Player	Position	Nationality	College
1	7	Tim Perry	Forward	United States	Temple
1	14	Dan Majerle	Guard	United States	Central Michigan
2	28	Andrew Lang	Center	United States	Arkansas
2	38	Dean Garrett	Center	United States	Indiana
2	50	Steve Kerr	Guard	United States	Arizona
3	55	Rodney Johns	Guard	United States	Grand Canyon

The Suns used their first-round pick to select power forward Tim Perry from Temple. Perry averaged 10.5 points and 7.6 rebounds per game in four years with the Owls. In his first three years with the Suns, Perry would average 4.2 points and 2.4 rebounds per game playing in a limited role. After becoming a starter in the 1991–92 season, Perry averaged 12.3 points, 6.9 rebounds and 1.5 blocks per game. After the season, he was traded, alongside Jeff Hornacek and Andrew Lang, to the Philadelphia 76ers for superstar forward Charles Barkley.

The Suns received the 14th pick from a trade with the Cleveland Cavaliers in 1988. With the pick they would select swingman Dan Majerle from Central Michigan. Majerle averaged 21.8 points, 8.9 rebounds and 2.2 assists per game in four years with the Chippewas. Majerle would spend his first seven seasons with the Suns, appearing in three All-Star games before being traded to the Cleveland Cavaliers in 1995. He would return to play for the Suns in the 2001–02 season before retiring. His number 9 jersey was retired by the franchise in 2003.

The Suns received the 28th pick from a trade with the Milwaukee Bucks in 1988. With the pick they would select center Andrew Lang from Arkansas. Lang averaged 6.9 points, 5.7 rebounds and 1.6 blocks per game in four years with the Razorbacks. Like Perry, Lang played a limited role in his first three seasons, averaging 3.7 points, 3.6 rebounds and 1.5 blocks per game. After becoming a starter in the 1991–92 season, Lang averaged 7.7 points, 6.7 rebounds and 2.5 blocks per game, before being traded to the 76ers.

In 1987, the Suns traded their second-round pick to the Sacramento Kings for Eddie Johnson. The pick was then traded to the New York Knicks and then to the Detroit Pistons, who selected small forward Fennis Dembo with the 30th pick.

The Suns received the 38th pick from a trade with the Cleveland Cavaliers in 1988. With the pick they would select center Dean Garrett from Indiana. Garrett averaged 13.6 points and 8.5 rebounds per game in two years with the Hoosiers. Garrett suffered a fractured foot before appearing in any games, and missed the entire season. He was waived before the start of the 1989–90 season without appearing in any games for the franchise.

The Suns received the 50th pick from a trade with the Los Angeles Lakers in 1985. With the pick they would select guard Steve Kerr from Arizona. Kerr averaged 11.2 points and 3.4 assists per game in four years with the Wildcats. Kerr would spend most of his rookie season on the injured reserve, averaging 2.1 points per game in 26 games, before being traded to the Cleveland Cavaliers in 1989.

The Suns used their third-round pick to select point guard Rodney Johns from Grand Canyon. Johns averaged 13.2 points, 3.7 rebounds and 4.0 assists per game in two years with the Antelopes. The Suns signed Johns to a contract on September 27, but he was waived on November 1 before the start of the season.

== Roster ==
1988–89 Phoenix Suns roster
Players

Pos.	No.	Player	Height	Weight	DOB	From
F	24	Tom Chambers	6 ft 10 in (2.08 m)	220 lb (100 kg)	1959–06–21	Utah
F	23	Tyrone Corbin	6 ft 6 in (1.98 m)	210 lb (95 kg)	1962–12–31	DePaul
G	25	T. R. Dunn	6 ft 4 in (1.93 m)	192 lb (87 kg)	1955–02–01	Alabama
C	22	Dean Garrett (injured) (IN)	6 ft 10 in (2.08 m)	225 lb (102 kg)	1966–11–27	Indiana
F	44	Kenny Gattison	6 ft 8 in (2.03 m)	225 lb (102 kg)	1964–05–23	Old Dominion
F	35	Armen Gilliam	6 ft 9 in (2.06 m)	230 lb (104 kg)	1964–05–28	UNLV
G	14	Jeff Hornacek	6 ft 3 in (1.91 m)	190 lb (86 kg)	1963–05–03	Iowa State
F	8	Eddie Johnson	6 ft 7 in (2.01 m)	215 lb (98 kg)	1959–05–01	Illinois
G	7	Kevin Johnson	6 ft 1 in (1.85 m)	180 lb (82 kg)	1966–03–04	California
G	4	Steve Kerr	6 ft 3 in (1.91 m)	175 lb (79 kg)	1965–09–27	Arizona
C	28	Andrew Lang	6 ft 11 in (2.11 m)	245 lb (111 kg)	1966–06–28	Arkansas
G	9	Dan Majerle	6 ft 6 in (1.98 m)	215 lb (98 kg)	1965–09–09	Central Michigan
F	45	Ed Nealy	6 ft 7 in (2.01 m)	238 lb (108 kg)	1960–02–19	Kansas State
F/C	34	Tim Perry	6 ft 9 in (2.06 m)	200 lb (91 kg)	1965–06–04	Temple
C	41	Mark West	6 ft 10 in (2.08 m)	230 lb (104 kg)	1960–11–05	Old Dominion

Coaches
Head coach
- Cotton Fitzsimmons
Assistant(s)
- Lionel Hollins
- Scotty Robertson
- Paul Westphal

Legend
- (DP) Unsigned draft pick
- (FA) Free agent
- (S) Suspended
- Injured

Roster
Updated: February 5, 1989

=== Roster Notes ===
- Rookie center Dean Garrett was on the injured reserve list due to a fractured foot, missed the entire regular season, and never played for the Suns.

== Regular season ==
=== Standings ===
Pacific Division	W	L	PCT	GB	Home	Road	Div
y-Los Angeles Lakers	57	25	.695	–	35–6	22–19	25–9
x-Phoenix Suns	55	27	.671	2	35–6	20–21	23–11
x-Seattle SuperSonics	47	35	.573	10	31–10	16–25	20–14
x-Golden State Warriors	43	39	.524	14	29–12	14–27	15–19
x-Portland Trail Blazers	39	43	.476	18	28–13	11–30	17–17
Sacramento Kings	27	55	.329	30	21–20	6–35	12–22
Los Angeles Clippers	21	61	.256	36	17–24	4–37	7–27

#	Western Conference				
#	Team	W	L	PCT	GB
1	c-Los Angeles Lakers	57	25	.695	–
2	y-Utah Jazz	51	31	.622	6
3	x-Phoenix Suns	55	27	.671	2
4	x-Seattle SuperSonics	47	35	.573	10
5	x-Houston Rockets	45	37	.549	12
6	x-Denver Nuggets	44	38	.537	13
7	x-Golden State Warriors	43	39	.524	14
8	x-Portland Trail Blazers	39	43	.476	18
9	Dallas Mavericks	38	44	.463	19
10	Sacramento Kings	27	55	.329	30
11	San Antonio Spurs	21	61	.256	36
12	Los Angeles Clippers	21	61	.256	36
13	Miami Heat	15	67	.183	42

== Playoffs ==
=== Game log ===
1989 playoff game log
First Round: 3–0 (home: 2–0; road: 1–0)

Game	Date	Team	Score	High points	High rebounds	High assists	Location Attendance	Series
1	April 28	Denver	W 104–103	Chambers, K. Johnson (26)	Tom Chambers (17)	Kevin Johnson (9)	Arizona Veterans Memorial Coliseum; 14,471	1–0
2	April 30	Denver	W 132–114	Kevin Johnson (34)	Tom Chambers (12)	Kevin Johnson (14)	Arizona Veterans Memorial Coliseum; 14,471	2–0
3	May 2	@ Denver	W 130–121	Chambers, K. Johnson (32)	Tom Chambers (17)	Kevin Johnson (16)	McNichols Sports Arena; 12,660	3–0

Conference semifinals: 4–1 (home: 2–1; road: 2–0)

Game	Date	Team	Score	High points	High rebounds	High assists	Location Attendance	Series
1	May 6	Golden State	W 130–103	Tom Chambers (25)	Eddie Johnson (9)	Kevin Johnson (11)	Arizona Veterans Memorial Coliseum; 14,471	1–0
2	May 9	Golden State	L 122–127	Eddie Johnson (35)	Eddie Johnson (9)	Kevin Johnson (12)	Arizona Veterans Memorial Coliseum; 14,471	1–1
3	May 11	@ Golden State	W 113–104	Tom Chambers (31)	Chambers, Corbin (14)	Kevin Johnson (15)	Oakland–Alameda County Coliseum Arena; 15,025	2–1
4	May 13	@ Golden State	W 135–99	Eddie Johnson (34)	Tyrone Corbin (13)	Hornacek, K. Johnson (8)	Oakland–Alameda County Coliseum Arena; 15,025	3–1
5	May 16	Golden State	W 116–104	three players tied (24)	Chambers, E. Johnson (11)	Kevin Johnson (11)	Arizona Veterans Memorial Coliseum; 14,471	4–1

Conference finals: 0–4 (home: 0–2; road: 0–2)

Game	Date	Team	Score	High points	High rebounds	High assists	Location Attendance	Series
1	May 20	@ L.A. Lakers	L 119–127	Kevin Johnson (27)	Tom Chambers (10)	Kevin Johnson (18)	Great Western Forum; 17,505	0–1
2	May 23	@ L.A. Lakers	L 95–101	Kevin Johnson (22)	Tom Chambers (10)	Kevin Johnson (10)	Great Western Forum; 17,505	0–2
3	May 26	L.A. Lakers	L 107–110	Tom Chambers (26)	Jeff Hornacek (11)	Kevin Johnson (15)	Arizona Veterans Memorial Coliseum; 14,471	0–3
4	May 28	L.A. Lakers	L 117–122	Tom Chambers (41)	Tom Chambers (13)	Kevin Johnson (10)	Arizona Veterans Memorial Coliseum; 14,471	0–4

1989 schedule

== Awards and honors ==
=== Week/Month ===
- Tom Chambers was named Player of the Week for games played January 23 through January 29.
- Kevin Johnson was named Player of the Week for games played March 13 through March 19.
- Kevin Johnson was named Player of the Month for February.
- Cotton Fitzsimmons was named Coach of the Month for April.

=== All-Star ===
- Tom Chambers was selected as a reserve in the 1989 All-Star Game. It was his second All-Star selection.

=== Season ===
- Kevin Johnson received the Most Improved Player Award.
- Eddie Johnson received the Sixth Man of the Year Award.
- Cotton Fitzsimmons received the Coach of the Year Award.
- Jerry Colangelo received the Executive of the Year Award.
- Kevin Johnson was named to the All-NBA Second Team. Johnson also finished 8th in the Most Valuable Player voting.
- Tom Chambers was named to the All-NBA Second Team. Chambers also finished 9th in the Most Valuable Player voting.

== Player statistics ==
Legend
GP	Games played	GS	Games started	MPG	Minutes per game
FG%	Field-goal percentage	3P%	3-point field-goal percentage	FT%	Free-throw percentage
RPG	Rebounds per game	APG	Assists per game	SPG	Steals per game
BPG	Blocks per game	PPG	Points per game

=== Season ===
Phoenix Suns statistics
Player	GP	GS	MPG	FG%	3P%	FT%	RPG	APG	SPG	BPG	PPG
Tom Chambers	81	81	37.1	.471	.326	.851	8.4	2.9	1.1	0.7	25.7
Tyrone Corbin	77	30	21.5	.540	.000	.788	5.2	1.5	1.1	0.2	8.2
Winston Crite	2	0	3.0	.000	.	.	0.5	0.0	.0	.0	0.0
Mark Davis*	2	0	3.5	.200	.000	1.000^	0.5	0.0	.0	.0	2.0
T. R. Dunn	34	1	9.4	.343	.	.750	1.8	0.7	0.4	.0	1.0
Kenny Gattison	2	0	4.5	.000	.	.500	0.5	0.0	.0	.0	0.5
Armon Gilliam	74	60	28.6	.503	.	.743	7.3	0.7	0.7	0.4	15.9
Craig Hodges*	10	0	9.2	.444	.333	.750	0.5	0.8	0.2	.0	3.9
Jeff Hornacek	78	73	31.9	.495	.333	.826	3.4	6.0	1.7	0.1	13.5
Eddie Johnson	70	7	29.2	.497	.413†	.868	4.4	2.3	0.7	0.1	21.5
Kevin Johnson	81	81	39.2	.505	.091	.882^	4.2	12.2	1.7	0.3	20.4
Steve Kerr	26	0	6.0	.435	.471†	.667	0.7	0.9	0.3	.0	2.1
Andrew Lang	62	25	8.5	.513	.	.650	2.4	0.1	0.3	0.8	2.6
Dan Majerle	54	5	25.1	.419	.329	.614	3.9	2.4	1.2	0.3	8.6
Ed Nealy*	30	0	5.5	.276	.000	.429	1.8	0.3	0.1	.0	0.6
Tim Perry	62	15	9.9	.537	.200	.615	2.1	0.3	0.3	0.5	4.1
Mark West	82	32	24.6	.653	.	.535	6.7	0.5	0.4	2.3	7.2

* – Stats with the Suns.
† – Minimum 55 three-pointers made.
^ – Minimum 125 free throws made.

=== Playoffs ===
Phoenix Suns statistics
Player	GP	GS	MPG	FG%	3P%	FT%	RPG	APG	SPG	BPG	PPG
Tom Chambers	12	12	41.3	.459	.409	.859	10.9	3.8	1.1	1.3	26.0
Tyrone Corbin	12	12	25.8	.523	.	.760	7.1	2.2	2.0	0.3	9.1
T. R. Dunn	8	0	9.9	.429	.	.500	1.9	0.1	0.6	.0	0.9
Armon Gilliam	9	0	14.0	.529	.	.864	5.0	0.2	0.1	0.2	8.1
Jeff Hornacek	12	12	31.2	.497	.000	.840	5.8	5.2	1.3	0.3	14.1
Eddie Johnson	12	0	32.7	.413	.342	.769	7.3	2.1	1.0	0.2	17.8
Kevin Johnson	12	12	41.2	.495	.300	.927	4.3	12.3	1.6	0.4	23.8
Andrew Lang	4	0	2.0	.000	.	.	1.5	0.3	.0	.0	0.0
Dan Majerle	12	0	29.3	.438	.286	.792	4.8	1.2	1.1	0.3	14.3
Ed Nealy	4	0	1.5	.333	.	.	0.8	0.0	.0	.0	0.5
Tim Perry	4	0	4.3	.500	.	.000	0.5	0.0	0.5	0.3	1.0
Mark West	12	12	18.9	.640	.	.714	4.4	0.5	0.6	1.6	6.2

Player statistics citation:

== Transactions ==
=== Trades ===
December 14, 1988	To Chicago Bulls (United States) Craig Hodges	To Phoenix Suns (United States) Ed Nealy 1989 second-round draft pick

=== Free agents ===
==== Additions ====
Date	Player	Contract	Former Team
July 5, 1988	Tom Chambers	Signed 5-year contract for $8.7 million	Seattle SuperSonics
December 30, 1988	Mark Davis	Signed two ten-day contracts	Milwaukee Bucks
January 16, 1989	T. R. Dunn	Signed two ten-day contracts	Denver Nuggets
February 5, 1989	T. R. Dunn	Signed for rest of season	Phoenix Suns

==== Subtractions ====
Date	Player	Reason left	New team
April 29, 1988	Alvan Adams	Retired	n/a
July 6, 1988	Walter Davis	Free agent	Denver Nuggets
June 23, 1988	Bernard Thompson	Expansion draft	Charlotte Hornets
June 30, 1988	James Bailey	Released	Glaxo Verona (Italy)
June 30, 1988	Jeff Cook	Released	AS Monaco (France)
August 29, 1988	Ron Moore	Released	n/a
December 27, 1988	Winston Crite	Waived	Brisbane Bullets (Australia)
January 14, 1989	Mark Davis	Waived	Milwaukee Bucks

Player Transactions Citation:
