= 1990–91 Phoenix Suns season =

NBA team season

- Head coach: Cotton Fitzsimmons
- General manager: Jerry Colangelo
- Owner: Jerry Colangelo
- Arena: Arizona Veterans Memorial Coliseum

Results
- Record: 55–27 (.671)
- Place: Division: 3rd (Pacific); Conference: 4th (Western)
- Playoff finish: First round (lost to Jazz 1–3)
- Stats at Basketball Reference

Local media
- Television: KUTP; ASPN
- Radio: KTAR

The 1990–91 Phoenix Suns season was the 23rd season for the Phoenix Suns in the National Basketball Association.

== Season summary ==
=== Off-season ===
The Suns had the 21st overall pick in the 1990 NBA draft, and selected power forward Jayson Williams out of St. John's University; the team also selected point guard Negele Knight from the University of Dayton with the 31st overall pick, and selected small forward Cedric Ceballos out of California State University, Fullerton with the 48th overall pick. However, Williams did not reach a contract agreement and never played for the Suns; he was later on traded to the Philadelphia 76ers.

=== Regular season ===
Early into the regular season, the Suns traveled overseas to Tokyo, Japan to play their first two games against the Utah Jazz at the Tokyo Metropolitan Gymnasium; this marked the first time that two teams in U.S. professional sports played a regular season game outside of North America. In the first game on November 2, 1990, the Suns were the road team and defeated the Jazz by a score of 119–96; Tom Chambers and Kevin Johnson both posted double-doubles, as Chambers finished with 38 points and 10 rebounds, while Johnson contributed 29 points and 10 assists. In the second game on November 3, the Suns were the home team and lost to the Jazz by a score of 102–101; Johnson led the Suns with 28 points, while Chambers added 19 points. Both games had an attendance of 10,111 fans at the Tokyo Metropolitan Gymnasium.

The Suns got off to an 8–7 start to the regular season in their first 15 games. In December, the team traded sixth man Eddie Johnson to the Seattle SuperSonics in exchange for All-Star forward Xavier McDaniel. The Suns posted a seven-game winning streak in December, then posted a six-game winning streak in January, and later on held a 30–16 record at the All-Star break. The Suns posted another seven-game winning streak in March, and finished in third place in the Pacific Division with a 55–27 record, earning the fourth seed in the Western Conference.

Kevin Johnson averaged 22.2 points, 10.1 assists and 2.1 steals per game, and was named to the All-NBA Second Team, while Chambers averaged 19.9 points and 6.4 rebounds per game, and Jeff Hornacek provided the team with 16.9 points, 5.1 assists and 1.4 steals per game. In addition, McDaniel averaged 15.8 points and 7.2 rebounds per game in 66 games after the trade, and sixth man Dan Majerle contributed 13.6 points and 5.4 rebounds per game off the bench, and was named to the NBA All-Defensive Second Team. Also off the bench, Ceballos contributed 8.2 points per game, while starting center Mark West averaged 7.7 points, 6.9 rebounds and 2.0 blocks per game, and also shot .647 in field-goal percentage, Knight contributed 5.3 points and 3.0 assists per game, and Andrew Lang provided with 4.9 points, 4.8 rebounds and 2.0 blocks per game.

During the NBA All-Star weekend at the Charlotte Coliseum in Charlotte, North Carolina, Chambers and Kevin Johnson were both selected for the 1991 NBA All-Star Game, as members of the Western Conference All-Star team; it was Chambers' fourth and final All-Star appearance. Kevin Johnson also finished in seventh place in Most Valuable Player voting, while Majerle finished in second place in Sixth Man of the Year voting, behind Detlef Schrempf of the Indiana Pacers; Majerle finished with 37 first-place votes, while Schrempf had 38.

The Suns finished 18th in the NBA in home-game attendance, with an attendance of 589,591 at the Arizona Veterans Memorial Coliseum during the regular season.

=== NBA playoffs ===
In the Western Conference First Round of the 1991 NBA playoffs, and for the second consecutive year, the Suns faced off against the 5th–seeded Jazz, who were led by the trio of All-Star forward Karl Malone, All-Star guard John Stockton, and Jeff Malone. The Suns suffered a Game 1 home loss to the Jazz by a 39-point margin, 129–90 at the Arizona Veterans Memorial Coliseum, but managed to win Game 2 at home, 102–92 to even the series. However, the Suns lost the next two games on the road, which included a Game 4 loss to the Jazz at the Salt Palace, 101–93, thus losing the series in four games.

=== Aftermath ===
Following the season, McDaniel was traded to the New York Knicks after only one season with the Suns.

== Draft picks ==
Round	Pick	Player	Position	Nationality	College
1	21	Jayson Williams	Forward	United States	St. John's
2	31	Negele Knight	Guard	United States	Dayton
2	48	Cedric Ceballos	Forward	United States	Cal State Fullerton
2	50	Miloš Babić	Center	Yugoslavia	Tennessee Tech

First round pick Jayson Williams did not reach an agreement with team president Jerry Colangelo over his rookie contract, and after months of discussion Phoenix sent him to the Philadelphia 76ers in exchange for a conditional first round selection in the 1994 NBA draft. Rights to Miloš Babić were traded to the Cleveland Cavaliers for the rights of Stefano Rusconi.

== Roster ==
1990–91 Phoenix Suns roster
Players

Pos.	No.	Player	Height	Weight	DOB	From
C	2	Joe Barry Carroll	7 ft 0 in (2.13 m)	225 lb (102 kg)	1958–07–24	Purdue
F	23	Cedric Ceballos	6 ft 6 in (1.98 m)	190 lb (86 kg)	1969–08–02	Cal State Fullerton
F	24	Tom Chambers	6 ft 10 in (2.08 m)	220 lb (100 kg)	1959–06–21	Utah
G	14	Jeff Hornacek	6 ft 3 in (1.91 m)	190 lb (86 kg)	1963–05–03	Iowa State
G	7	Kevin Johnson	6 ft 1 in (1.85 m)	180 lb (82 kg)	1966–03–04	California
G	32	Negele Knight	6 ft 1 in (1.85 m)	175 lb (79 kg)	1967–03–06	Dayton
C	28	Andrew Lang	6 ft 11 in (2.11 m)	245 lb (111 kg)	1966–06–28	Arkansas
F	51	Ian Lockhart	6 ft 8 in (2.03 m)	240 lb (109 kg)	1967–06–25	Tennessee
F	9	Dan Majerle	6 ft 6 in (1.98 m)	215 lb (98 kg)	1965–09–09	Central Michigan
F	35	Xavier McDaniel	6 ft 7 in (2.01 m)	205 lb (93 kg)	1963–06–04	Wichita State
F	45	Ed Nealy	6 ft 7 in (2.01 m)	238 lb (108 kg)	1960–02–19	Kansas State
C	34	Tim Perry	6 ft 9 in (2.06 m)	200 lb (91 kg)	1965–06–04	Temple
F	31	Kurt Rambis	6 ft 8 in (2.03 m)	213 lb (97 kg)	1958–02–25	Santa Clara
C	41	Mark West	6 ft 10 in (2.08 m)	230 lb (104 kg)	1960–11–05	Old Dominion

Coaches
Head coach
- Cotton Fitzsimmons
Assistant(s)
- Lionel Hollins
- Scotty Robertson
- Paul Westphal

Legend
- (DP) Unsigned draft pick
- (FA) Free agent
- (S) Suspended
- Injured

Roster
Updated: January 26, 1991

== Pre-season ==
1990 Pre-season game log: 7–1
#	Date	Opponent	Score	Location	Record
1	October 11	Denver Nuggets	W 186-123	Arizona State University Activity Center	1-0
2	October 16	Utah Jazz	W 98-92	Salt Palace	2-0
3	October 18	Cleveland Cavaliers	W 111-103	Arizona State University Activity Center	3-0
4	October 20	Golden State Warriors	W 128-124	El Paso, Texas	4-0
5	October 23	Cleveland Cavaliers	W 119-114	Richfield Coliseum	5-0
6	October 24	Milwaukee Bucks	L 112-116	Arizona State University Activity Center	5-1
7	October 26	Indiana Pacers	W 109-107	Market Square Arena	6-1
8	October 27	Chicago Bulls	W 117-110	Chicago Stadium	7-1

== Regular season ==
=== Season standings ===
Pacific Division	W	L	PCT	GB	Home	Road	Div
y-Portland Trail Blazers	63	19	.768	—	36–5	27–14	18-10
x-Los Angeles Lakers	58	24	.707	5	33–8	25-16	19-9
x-Phoenix Suns	55	27	.671	8	32–9	23-18	17–11
x-Golden State Warriors	44	38	.537	19	30–11	14–27	13–15
x-Seattle SuperSonics	41	41	.500	22	28-13	13–28	12-16
Los Angeles Clippers	31	51	.378	32	23–18	8-33	10-18
Sacramento Kings	25	57	.305	38	24-17	1–40	9–19

y – clinched division title
x – clinched playoff spot

#	Western Conference				
#	Team	W	L	PCT	GB
1	z-Portland Trail Blazers	63	19	.768	–
2	y-San Antonio Spurs	55	27	.671	8
3	x-Los Angeles Lakers	58	24	.707	5
4	x-Phoenix Suns	55	27	.671	8
5	x-Utah Jazz	54	28	.659	9
6	x-Houston Rockets	52	30	.634	11
7	x-Golden State Warriors	44	38	.537	19
8	x-Seattle SuperSonics	41	41	.500	22
9	Orlando Magic	31	51	.378	32
10	Los Angeles Clippers	31	51	.378	32
11	Minnesota Timberwolves	29	53	.354	34
12	Dallas Mavericks	28	54	.341	35
13	Sacramento Kings	25	57	.305	38
14	Denver Nuggets	20	62	.244	43

z – clinched division title
y – clinched division title
x – clinched playoff spot

== Playoffs ==
=== Game log ===
1991 playoff game log
First Round: 1–3 (home: 1–1; road: 0–2)

Game	Date	Team	Score	High points	High rebounds	High assists	Location Attendance	Series
1	April 25	Utah	L 90–129	Negele Knight (18)	Jeff Hornacek (5)	Kevin Johnson (6)	Arizona Veterans Memorial Coliseum; 14,487	0–1
2	April 27	Utah	W 102–92	Jeff Hornacek (25)	Andrew Lang (8)	Kevin Johnson (12)	Arizona Veterans Memorial Coliseum; 14,487	1–1
3	April 30	@ Utah	L 98–107	Tom Chambers (26)	Jeff Hornacek (10)	Kevin Johnson (10)	Salt Palace; 12,616	1–2
4	May 2	@ Utah	L 93–101	Jeff Hornacek (30)	Tom Chambers (7)	Kevin Johnson (11)	Salt Palace; 12,616	1–3

1991 schedule

== Awards and records ==
=== All-Star Game ===
- Tom Chambers and Kevin Johnson were selected to play in the 1991 NBA All-Star Game, their fourth and second appearances respectively.

=== Awards ===
- Kevin Johnson was selected to the All-NBA Second Team, and finished seventh in Most Valuable Player voting.
- Dan Majerle was selected to the NBA All-Defensive Second Team, and finished second in Sixth Man of the Year voting.

=== Records ===
- In a game against the Denver Nuggets on November 10, 1990, the Suns broke the NBA scoring record for a team in a half, by finishing the first two quarters ahead 107–67.
- In Game 1 of the Western Conference First Round against the Utah Jazz, Phoenix suffered their worst playoff loss in franchise history up to that point, by losing 129–90.

== Injuries/Missed games ==
- 10/30/90: Ricky Blanton: Viral infection; placed on injured list until waived on November 14
- 10/30/90: Negele Knight: Pulled hamstring; placed on injured list until November 21
- 10/30/90: Andrew Lang: Leg stress fracture; placed on injured list until November 16
- 11/03/90: Jeff Hornacek: Sore neck; did not play
- 11/07/90: Jeff Hornacek: Sore neck; did not play
- 11/16/90: Ian Lockhart: Knee, ankle injuries: placed on injured list for rest of season
- 11/21/90: Tim Perry: Sprained ankle; placed on injured list until December 5
- 12/05/90: Andrew Lang: Bruised arm; placed on injured list until December 26
- 12/26/90: Kenny Battle: Sprained ankle; placed on injured list until waived on January 23
- 01/02/91: Tom Chambers: Pulled hamstring; did not play
- 01/04/91: Tom Chambers: Pulled hamstring; did not play
- 01/05/91: Tom Chambers: Pulled hamstring; did not play
- 01/27/91: Joe Barry Carroll: Placed on suspended list until February 19
- 01/27/91: Kurt Rambis: Sprained ankle; placed on injured list until February 5
- 02/19/91: Tim Perry: Knee tendinitis; placed on injured list until March 17
- 03/17/91: Joe Barry Carroll: Sore hamstring; placed on injured list until April 21
- 04/05/91: Kevin Johnson: Strained hamstring; did not play
- 04/05/91: Dan Majerle: Injured hip; did not play
- 04/07/91: Kevin Johnson: Strained hamstring; did not play
- 04/07/91: Dan Majerle: Injured hip: did not play
- 04/09/91: Tom Chambers: Back spasms; did not play
- 04/09/91: Kevin Johnson: Strained hamstring; did not play
- 04/09/91: Dan Majerle: Spinal nerve irritation; did not play
- 04/12/91: Tom Chambers: Back spasms; did not play
- 04/12/91: Kevin Johnson: Strained hamstring; did not play
- 04/12/91: Dan Majerle: Spinal nerve irritation; did not play
- 04/14/91: Tom Chambers: Back spasms; did not play
- 04/14/91: Kevin Johnson: Strained hamstring; did not play
- 04/14/91: Dan Majerle: Spinal nerve irritation; did not play
- 04/21/91: Tim Perry: Knee tendinitis; placed on injured list for rest of season

== Player statistics ==
Legend
GP	Games played	GS	Games started	MPG	Minutes per game
FG%	Field-goal percentage	3P%	3-point field-goal percentage	FT%	Free-throw percentage
RPG	Rebounds per game	APG	Assists per game	SPG	Steals per game
BPG	Blocks per game	PPG	Points per game

=== Season ===
Player	GP	GS	MPG	FG%	3P%	FT%	RPG	APG	SPG	BPG	PPG
Kenny Battle*	16	4	16.4	.442	.000	.690	3.3	0.9	1.2	.4	6.0
Joe Barry Carroll	11	0	8.7	.361	.	.917^	2.2	1.0	.1	.7	3.4
Cedric Ceballos	63	0	11.6	.487	.167	.663	2.4	0.6	.3	.1	8.2
Tom Chambers	76	75	32.6	.437	.274	.826	6.4	2.6	.9	.7	19.9
Jeff Hornacek	80	77	34.2	.518	.418	.897^	4.0	5.1	1.4	.2	16.9
Eddie Johnson*	15	0	20.8	.473	.286	.724	3.1	1.1	.6	.1	13.5
Kevin Johnson	77	76	36.0	.516	.205	.843	3.5	10.1	2.1	.1	22.2
Negele Knight	64	6	12.4	.425	.240	.602	1.1	3.0	.3	.1	5.3
Andrew Lang	63	18	18.3	.577	.000	.715	4.8	0.4	.3	2.0	4.9
Ian Lockhart	1	0	2.0	1.000+	.	1.000^	0.0	0.0	.0	.0	4.0
Dan Majerle	77	7	29.6	.484	.349	.762	5.4	2.8	1.4	.5	13.6
Xavier McDaniel*	66	64	31.9	.503	.000	.727	7.2	2.3	.8	.6	15.8
Ed Nealy	55	0	10.4	.464	.313	.737	2.7	0.7	.4	.1	2.2
Tim Perry	46	2	12.8	.521	.000	.614	2.7	0.6	.5	.9	4.2
Kurt Rambis	62	17	14.5	.497	.000	.706	4.3	1.0	.4	.2	3.6
Mark West	82	64	23.9	.647+	.	.655	6.9	0.5	.4	2.0	7.7

* – Stats with the Suns.
+ – Minimum 50 games played.
^ – Minimum 125 free throws made.

=== Playoffs ===
Player	GP	GS	MPG	FG%	3P%	FT%	RPG	APG	SPG	BPG	PPG
Joe Barry Carroll	2	0	7.5	.500	.	.000	0.5	1.0	.0	.5	4.0
Cedric Ceballos	3	0	8.0	.583	.	.333	1.7	0.7	.7	.0	5.3
Tom Chambers	4	4	35.5	.409	.000	.737	5.8	2.5	1.8	1.3	17.0
Jeff Hornacek	4	4	36.3	.431	.500	.929	6.3	2.0	.8	.5	18.3
Kevin Johnson	4	4	36.5	.302	.143	.600	3.3	9.8	.5	.3	12.8
Negele Knight	4	0	14.0	.500	.333	.714	1.0	2.3	.3	.0	8.0
Andrew Lang	4	0	13.8	.545	.	.824	4.5	0.3	.3	.8	6.5
Dan Majerle	4	0	27.5	.375	.364	.737	3.8	1.8	1.3	.3	10.5
Xavier McDaniel	4	4	25.3	.415	.000	.667	3.8	1.3	.0	.5	9.5
Ed Nealy	2	0	10.0	.200	.000	.	2.5	0.0	.0	.0	1.0
Kurt Rambis	4	0	13.3	.400	.	.	3.5	1.0	1.3	.3	1.0
Mark West	4	4	23.3	.600	.	.714	4.5	0.5	.5	2.5	5.8

Player statistics citation:

== Transactions ==
Players Added

Draft

- Negele Knight
- Cedric Ceballos

Free agency

- Ed Nealy (July 23, 1990)
- Ian Lockhart (August 28, 1990)
- Joe Barry Carroll (January 26, 1991)
Players Lost

Released

- Mike McGee (July 1, 1990)

Waived

- Ricky Blanton (November 14, 1990)
- Kenny Battle (January 23, 1991)

Free agency

- Tim Legler (July 20, 1990) (to Minnesota)
- Greg Grant (October 1, 1990) (to New York)

=== Trades ===
September 28, 1990	To Phoenix Suns Conditional second round pick for 1993	To Washington Bullets Mike Morrison
October 28, 1990	To Phoenix Suns Conditional first round pick for 1994	To Philadelphia 76ers Jayson Williams
December 7, 1990	To Phoenix Suns Xavier McDaniel	To Seattle SuperSonics Eddie Johnson Conditional first round picks for 1991 and 1994

== See also ==
- 1990–91 NBA season
