= Andrew Lang (basketball) =

American basketball player (born 1966)

Personal information
- Born: June 28, 1966 (age 60) Pine Bluff, Arkansas, U.S.
- Listed height: 6 ft 11 in (2.11 m)
- Listed weight: 275 lb (125 kg)

Career information
- High school: Dollarway (Pine Bluff, Arkansas)
- College: Arkansas (1984–1988)
- NBA draft: 1988: 2nd round, 28th overall pick
- Drafted by: Phoenix Suns
- Playing career: 1988–2000
- Position: Center
- Number: 28

Career history
- 1988–1992: Phoenix Suns
- 1992–1993: Philadelphia 76ers
- 1993–1996: Atlanta Hawks
- 1996: Minnesota Timberwolves
- 1996–1998: Milwaukee Bucks
- 1999: Chicago Bulls
- 1999–2000: New York Knicks

Career highlights
- McDonald's All-American (1984)

Career NBA statistics
- Points: 4,431 (6.0 ppg)
- Rebounds: 3,511 (4.8 rpg)
- Stats at NBA.com
- Stats at Basketball Reference

Andrew Charles Lang Jr. (born June 28, 1966) is an American former professional basketball player who played twelve seasons in the National Basketball Association (NBA). He played college basketball for the Arkansas Razorbacks.

== Career ==
After a four-year career at the University of Arkansas, Lang was selected by the Phoenix Suns in the second round (28th pick overall) of the 1988 NBA draft. He quickly developed a reputation as a proficient shotblocker. For years, he maintained the fourth all-time NBA record of one blocked shot every 9.12 minutes.

After starting a career-high 71 games while recording career-highs of 6.7 rebounds and 2.5 blocks per game in 1992, Lang was traded (along with Jeff Hornacek and Tim Perry) to the Philadelphia 76ers for All-Star forward Charles Barkley.

Somewhat of a journeyman center, he also played for the Atlanta Hawks, Minnesota Timberwolves, Milwaukee Bucks, Chicago Bulls and New York Knicks before retiring in 2000. He finished his career averaging 6.0 points, 4.8 rebounds and 1.5 blocked shots per game.

Lang is the 87th all-time leading shot blocker in NBA history.

While on the Bucks, Lang received attention for a 1997 incident at the Bradley Center in Milwaukee, involving him fouling Knicks star center Patrick Ewing. After a midair collision with Lang, Ewing fell on his wrist and the Bucks went on to win the game, while Ewing did not return until the second round of the playoffs. Ewing never again regained his All-Star form after that injury. Lang later signed with the Knicks to be Ewing's backup at the center position.

== Personal life ==
Lang is a Christian evangelist and is currently employed by the Atlanta Hawks as the team chaplain. Lang lives in Marietta, Georgia with his wife, Bronwyn. His son Trey played college basketball for the UMass Minutemen. His other son, Chad, played college basketball for the Belmont Bruins and the Lipscomb Bisons.

== NBA career statistics ==
Legend
GP	Games played	GS	Games started	MPG	Minutes per game
FG%	Field goal percentage	3P%	3-point field goal percentage	FT%	Free throw percentage
RPG	Rebounds per game	APG	Assists per game	SPG	Steals per game
BPG	Blocks per game	PPG	Points per game	**Bold**	Career high
*	Led the league

=== Regular season ===
Year	Team	GP	GS	MPG	FG%	3P%	FT%	RPG	APG	SPG	BPG	PPG
1988–89	Phoenix	62	25	8.5	.513	.000	.650	2.4	0.1	0.3	0.8	2.6
1989–90	Phoenix	74	0	13.7	.557	.000	.653	3.7	0.3	0.3	1.8	3.5
1990–91	Phoenix	63	18	18.3	**.577**	.000	.715	4.8	0.4	0.3	2.0	4.9
1991–92	Phoenix	81	**71**	24.3	.522	.000	.768	**6.7**	0.5	0.6	**2.5**	7.7
1992–93	Philadelphia	73	59	25.5	.425	.200	.763	6.0	1.1	0.6	1.9	5.3
1993–94	Atlanta	**82***	0	19.6	.469	.250	.689	3.8	0.6	0.5	1.1	6.1
1994–95	Atlanta	**82***	63	28.5	.473	**.667**	**.809**	5.6	0.9	0.5	1.8	9.7
1995–96	Atlanta	51	51	**35.6**	.454	.000	.805	6.5	**1.2**	**0.7**	1.7	**12.9**
1995–96	Minnesota	20	18	27.5	.421	.500	.789	6.1	0.2	0.4	2.1	8.8
1996–97	Milwaukee	52	52	23.0	.464	.000	.721	5.3	0.5	0.5	0.9	5.3
1997–98	Milwaukee	57	0	12.1	.378	.000	.772	2.7	0.3	0.3	0.5	2.7
1998–99	Chicago	21	13	18.4	.323	.000	.696	4.4	0.6	0.2	0.6	3.8
1999–00	New York	19	10	12.8	.438	.000	.429	3.2	0.2	0.4	0.3	3.1
Career		737	380	20.8	.470	.250	.744	4.8	0.6	0.5	1.5	6.0

=== Playoffs ===
Year	Team	GP	GS	MPG	FG%	3P%	FT%	RPG	APG	SPG	BPG	PPG
1988–89	Phoenix	4	0	2.0	.000	.000	.000	1.5	0.3	0.0	0.0	0.0
1989–90	Phoenix	**12**	0	7.8	**.667**	.000	.571	1.7	0.2	0.3	0.8	1.3
1990–91	Phoenix	4	0	13.8	.545	.000	**.824**	**4.5**	0.3	0.3	0.8	6.5
1991–92	Phoenix	8	**8**	24.0	.375	.000	.789	4.0	0.3	0.4	**1.9**	5.6
1993–94	Atlanta	11	0	21.3	.460	.000	.773	4.3	**0.5**	0.5	1.8	6.8
1994–95	Atlanta	3	3	**33.7**	.429	.000	.778	4.0	0.3	**0.7**	0.7	**10.3**
Career		42	11	16.3	.444	.000	.770	3.2	0.3	0.4	1.2	4.6
