= Tyrone Corbin =

American basketball player and coach (born 1962)

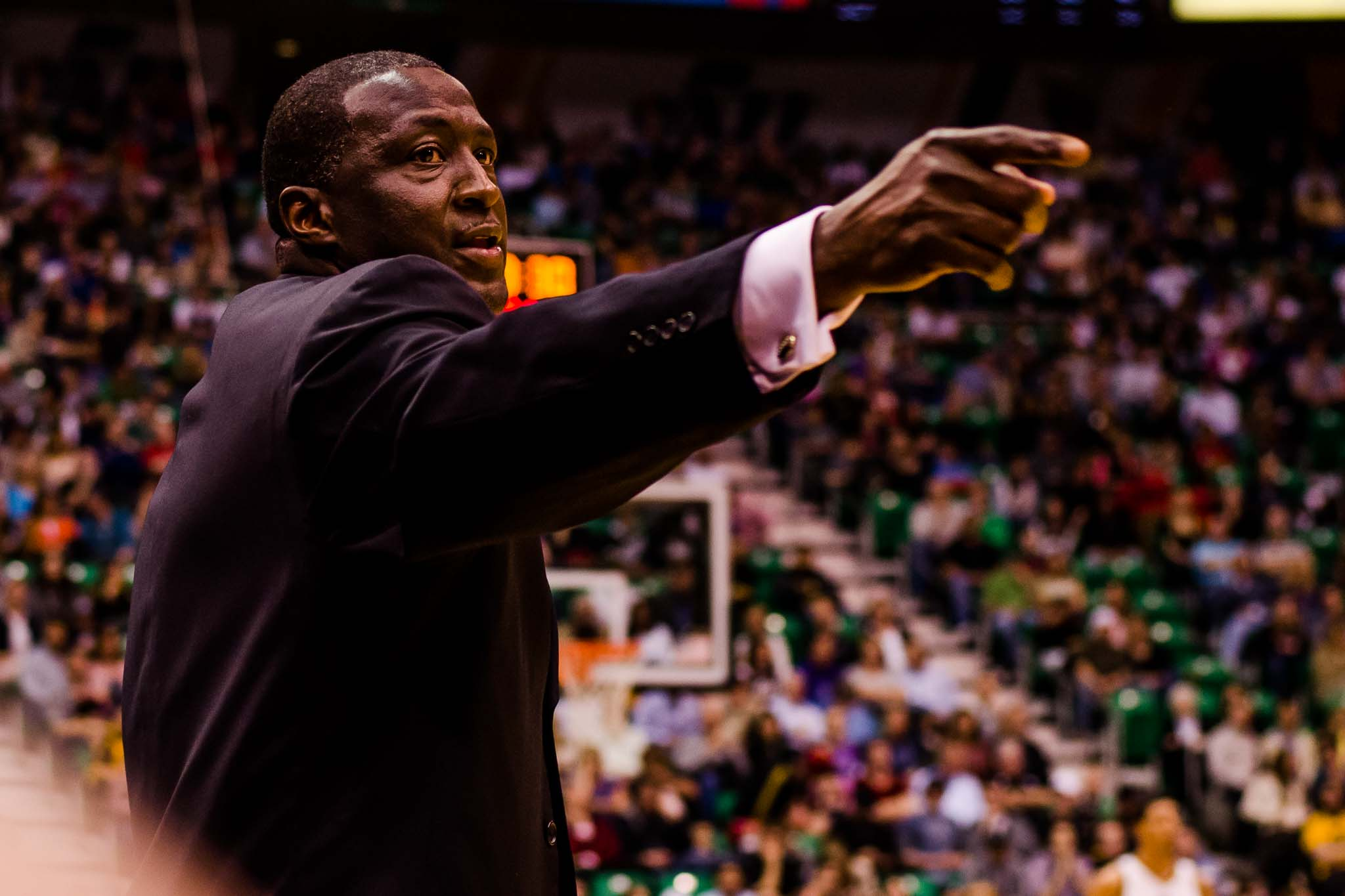
- Corbin in Salt Lake City, Utah, as the head coach of the Utah Jazz (2013)

Personal information
- Born: December 31, 1962 (age 63) Columbia, South Carolina, U.S.
- Listed height: 6 ft 6 in (1.98 m)
- Listed weight: 210 lb (95 kg)

Career information
- High school: A.C. Flora (Forest Acres, South Carolina)
- College: DePaul (1981–1985)
- NBA draft: 1985: 2nd round, 35th overall pick
- Drafted by: San Antonio Spurs
- Playing career: 1985–2001
- Position: Small forward / shooting guard
- Number: 23, 33
- Coaching career: 2004–present

Career history

Playing
- 1985–1987: San Antonio Spurs
- 1987–1988: Cleveland Cavaliers
- 1988–1989: Phoenix Suns
- 1989–1991: Minnesota Timberwolves
- 1991–1994: Utah Jazz
- 1994–1995: Atlanta Hawks
- 1995–1996: Sacramento Kings
- 1996: Miami Heat
- 1996–1999: Atlanta Hawks
- 1999–2000: Sacramento Kings
- 2000–2001: Toronto Raptors

Coaching
- 2004–2011: Utah Jazz (assistant)
- 2011–2014: Utah Jazz
- 2014: Sacramento Kings (assistant)
- 2014–2015: Sacramento Kings (interim)
- 2016–2018: Phoenix Suns (assistant)
- 2018–2021: Orlando Magic (assistant)
- 2022–2024: Charlotte Hornets (assistant)

Career NBA statistics
- Points: 9,766 (9.2 ppg)
- Rebounds: 5,046 (4.7 rpg)
- Steals: 1,228 (1.2 spg)
- Stats at NBA.com
- Stats at Basketball Reference

Tyrone Kennedy Corbin (born December 31, 1962) is an American former professional basketball player who last worked as an assistant coach for the Charlotte Hornets. He was first appointed the assistant coach of the Phoenix Suns, then was named the Utah Jazz’s head coach, on February 10, 2011, following the resignation of longtime coach Jerry Sloan. He was also the brief interim head coach of the Sacramento Kings in the 2014–15 season before being replaced by George Karl. Prior to that, Corbin played 16 seasons in the NBA.

== College career ==
Corbin played collegiately at DePaul University from 1981 to 1985. He played in 120 games for the Blue Demons, increasing his scoring average and field goal and free throw percentage in each of his four seasons. Corbin posted averages of 11.5 points (on .504 FG and .764 FT), 7.4 rebounds, 1.9 assists, 1.1 steal and 2.3 turnovers in 31.1 minutes per game. He finished seventh on DePaul's career scoring list and was a two-time honorable mention AP All-America selection, as well as an All-NIT choice in 1983, and he was invited to the 1984 Olympic trials.

He graduated with a degree in computer science, before becoming a second-round pick of the San Antonio Spurs in the 1985 NBA draft. He was a team captain in his junior and senior years; the former was Ray Meyer's last as head coach, the latter was Joey Meyer's first. He was inducted into the DePaul University Athletics Hall of Fame in 2005.

== NBA career ==
Corbin played in the NBA at small forward from 1985 to 2000. His first two seasons were with the San Antonio Spurs, as he was their selection in the second round (35th pick overall) of the 1985 NBA Draft. After signing with the Cleveland Cavaliers in January 1987, he was part of the trade by the Cavs which sent Kevin Johnson, Mark West, 1988 first-round and second-round draft picks and a 1989 second-round draft pick to the Phoenix Suns for Larry Nance, Mike Sanders and a 1988 first-round draft choice in February 1988.

After being selected by the Minnesota Timberwolves in the expansion draft in 1989, he led the team and established career-highs in 1989–90 in rebounds (7.4) and steals (2.13). Corbin also recorded the first triple-double in Timberwolves history, with 10 points, 13 rebounds and a career-high 10 assists, against the Dallas Mavericks on January 2, 1991.

His stint with the Jazz came by a trade with the Minnesota Timberwolves for Thurl Bailey early in the 1991–92 season, enabling him to help the team reach the NBA Western Conference Finals twice. He averaged 9.6 points and 6.2 rebounds in 233 games for the Jazz from 1991 to 1994.

He was then traded by the Jazz with a 1995 second-round draft pick to the Atlanta Hawks for Adam Keefe in September 1994. It was in Atlanta where his streak of 415 consecutive games played would be broken. Corbin then was traded to the Sacramento Kings for Spud Webb in June 1995. Along with Walt Williams, he went to the Miami Heat for Billy Owens and Kevin Gamble in February 1996.

He then spent three seasons with the Hawks via free-agent signing in 1996. After returning to the Kings as a free agent in 1999, he spent the next season with the Toronto Raptors. He was traded by Toronto on February 22, 2001, with Corliss Williamson, Kornel David and a first-round draft pick to the Detroit Pistons for Jerome Williams and Eric Montross in February 2001. Corbin was waived the next day, never again to be on an NBA team as a player.

Wearing No. 23 and No. 33 throughout his playing career, he averaged 9.3 points (on .457 percent from the field), 4.8 rebounds, 1.8 assists and 1.2 steals in nearly 26 minutes per game while playing 1,065 games in his career. A versatile small forward, Corbin also played in 81 NBA playoff games in his career, including 37 with the Jazz, averaging 8.4 points and 5.0 rebounds per game.

== Coaching career ==
After his playing career, Corbin spent one season with the Charleston Lowgators of the NBDL as a player mentor. Corbin was hired by Scott Layden, then general manager of the New York Knicks, as manager of Knicks player development for the 2003–04 season. In 2004, he went to the Utah Jazz, spending seven years as an assistant coach under Jerry Sloan before eventually succeeding Sloan as head coach in 2011.

On April 21, 2014, the Jazz announced that they had elected not to offer Corbin a new contract. Afterwards he became an assistant coach of the Sacramento Kings and on December 15, 2014, he was promoted to interim head coach after Michael Malone was fired. On February 12, 2015, he was relieved of his head coaching duties by the Kings, choosing to continue working with the organization as an advisor to the front office.

On June 25, 2016, two days after the 2016 NBA draft ended, the Phoenix Suns announced that Corbin would return to the Phoenix Suns as an assistant coach under Earl Watson's newest coaching staff. Watson was a previous player under Corbin's tenure during his last season coaching the Jazz, and was also a mentor for Watson as he began his transition into coaching in the NBA. He'd also be reunited later on with Mehmet Okur, another former player he coached that would join the Suns' coaching staff as a player development coach. After a 2 season stint in Phoenix, Corbin and the Suns parted ways.

On June 26, 2018, Corbin was hired by the Orlando Magic as assistant coach.

On August 2, 2022, Corbin was hired by the Charlotte Hornets as an assistant coach.

== Career playing statistics ==
Legend
GP	Games played	GS	Games started	MPG	Minutes per game
FG%	Field goal percentage	3P%	3-point field goal percentage	FT%	Free throw percentage
RPG	Rebounds per game	APG	Assists per game	SPG	Steals per game
BPG	Blocks per game	PPG	Points per game	**Bold**	Career high
*	Led the league

=== NBA ===
==== Regular season ====
Year	Team	GP	GS	MPG	FG%	3P%	FT%	RPG	APG	SPG	BPG	PPG
1985–86	San Antonio	16	0	10.9	.422	.000	.714	1.6	.7	.7	.1	4.0
1986–87	San Antonio	31	15	23.6	.428	–	.731	3.8	2.6	1.2	.1	8.9
1986–87	Cleveland	32	0	13.7	.368	.250	.737	3.0	.5	.5	.1	4.0
1987–88	Cleveland	**54***	4	21.3	.491	.000	.786	4.1	1.0	.8	.3	7.3
1987–88	Phoenix	**30***	1	19.7	.488	.333	.825	4.3	2.0	1.0	.1	7.7
1988–89	Phoenix	77	30	21.5	**.540**	.000	.788	5.2	1.5	1.1	.2	10.2
1989–90	Minnesota	82*	80	36.7	.481	.000	.770	**7.4**	2.6	**2.1**	.5	14.7
1990–91	Minnesota	82*	**82***	**39.0**	.448	.200	.798	7.2	**4.2**	2.0	**.6**	**18.0**
1991–92	Minnesota	11	8	31.3	.401	.000	.830	6.3	3.0	1.1	.5	14.4
1991–92	Utah	69	1	27.0	.504	.000	**.878**	5.8	1.6	1.0	.2	9.0
1992–93	Utah	82	58	31.2	.503	.000	.826	6.3	2.1	1.3	.4	11.6
1993–94	Utah	82*	17	26.2	.456	.207	.813	4.7	1.5	1.2	.3	8.0
1994–95	Atlanta	81	4	17.1	.442	.250	.684	3.2	.8	.7	.2	6.2
1995–96	Sacramento	49	2	19.0	.452	.083	.837	3.7	1.2	1.0	.3	6.4
1995–96	Miami	22	0	16.1	.413	.333	.821	3.0	1.0	.7	.1	4.6
1996–97	Atlanta	70	65	32.9	.422	**.356**	.796	4.2	1.8	1.3	.1	9.5
1997–98	Atlanta	79	79	34.2	.439	.348	.789	4.6	2.2	1.3	.1	10.2
1998–99	Atlanta	47	6	22.7	.391	.319	.650	3.1	.9	.7	.1	7.5
1999–00	Sacramento	54	5	17.4	.357	.227	.846	3.1	1.1	.7	.1	4.1
2000–01	Toronto	15	1	7.8	.237	.000	.500	.9	.3	.1	.0	1.3
Career		1,065	458	26.0	.456	.299	.791	4.7	1.8	1.2	.3	9.2

==== Playoffs ====
Year	Team	GP	GS	MPG	FG%	3P%	FT%	RPG	APG	SPG	BPG	PPG
1986	San Antonio	1	0	14.0	.000	–	–	1.0	1.0	.0	.0	.0
1989	Phoenix	12	**12**	25.8	**.523**	–	.760	7.1	**2.2**	**2.0**	**.3**	9.1
1992	Utah	**16**	0	27.9	.504	.000	.778	5.5	1.1	.8	.2	11.3
1993	Utah	5	0	32.2	.480	–	.647	**7.8**	1.8	.6	.2	**11.8**
1994	Utah	**16**	11	25.8	.387	.333	.933	4.9	.9	1.3	.2	6.3
1995	Atlanta	3	2	26.3	.462	.333	.889	3.3	.7	.7	**.3**	11.3
1996	Miami	2	0	17.0	.200	–	.750	3.5	.5	1.0	.0	2.5
1997	Atlanta	10	10	**36.4**	.457	**.351**	**1.000**	4.3	2.0	.4	.2	10.6
1998	Atlanta	4	4	28.3	.280	.167	–	3.8	1.0	1.5	**.3**	3.8
1999	Atlanta	9	4	29.8	.417	.261	.750	3.7	1.8	.7	.0	7.7
2000	Sacramento	3	0	7.7	.400	.000	.000	1.7	1.0	.0	.0	1.3
Career		81	43	27.5	.449	.295	.790	5.0	1.4	1.0	.2	8.4

== Head coaching record ==
Legend
Regular season	G	Games coached	W	Games won	L	Games lost	W–L %	Win–loss %
Playoffs	PG	Playoff games	PW	Playoff wins	PL	Playoff losses	PW–L %	Playoff win–loss %

Team	Year	G	W	L	W–L%	Finish	PG	PW	PL	PW–L%	Result
Utah	2010–11	28	8	20	.286	4th in Northwest	—	—	—	—	Missed Playoffs
Utah	2011–12	66	36	30	.545	3rd in Northwest	4	0	4	.000	Lost in First round
Utah	2012–13	82	43	39	.524	3rd in Northwest	—	—	—	—	Missed Playoffs
Utah	2013–14	82	25	57	.305	5th in Northwest	—	—	—	—	Missed Playoffs
Sacramento	2014–15	28	7	21	.250	(interim)	—	—	—	—	
Career		286	119	167	.416		4	0	4	.000	

== Personal life ==
Corbin has two children, Tyjha, and Tyrell with his wife, high school sweetheart, Dante. Tyrell was one of the top basketball prospects from Utah, playing point guard for West High. He was named Utah's Mr. Basketball in the year 2011. He went on to play for the UC Davis Aggies men's basketball team, a Division I school competing in the Big West Conference and coached by Jim Les, his father's Atlanta Hawks teammate from the 1994–95 NBA season. Tyrell Corbin most recently played for Mega Tbilisi in the Georgian Superliga in 2022.
