= Eddie Johnson (basketball, born 1959) =

American basketball player (born 1959)

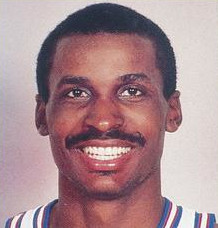
- Johnson (c. 1986)

Personal information
- Born: May 1, 1959 (age 67) Chicago, Illinois, U.S.
- Listed height: 6 ft 7 in (2.01 m)
- Listed weight: 215 lb (98 kg)

Career information
- High school: Westinghouse (Chicago, Illinois)
- College: Illinois (1977–1981)
- NBA draft: 1981: 2nd round, 29th overall pick
- Drafted by: Kansas City Kings
- Playing career: 1981–1999
- Position: Small forward
- Number: 8, 22

Career history
- 1981–1987: Kansas City / Sacramento Kings
- 1987–1990: Phoenix Suns
- 1990–1993: Seattle SuperSonics
- 1993–1994: Charlotte Hornets
- 1994–1995: Olympiacos
- 1995–1997: Indiana Pacers
- 1997–1999: Houston Rockets

Career highlights
- NBA Sixth Man of the Year (1989); Greek League champion (1995); Greek League Finals MVP (1995); Greek All-Star (1994 II); McDonald's All-American (1977); Second-team Parade All-American (1977)

Career NBA statistics
- Points: 19,202 (16.0 ppg)
- Rebounds: 4,832 (4.0 rpg)
- Assists: 2,550 (2.1 apg)
- Stats at NBA.com
- Stats at Basketball Reference

Edward Arnet Johnson (born May 1, 1959) is an American former professional basketball player who spent 17 seasons in the National Basketball Association (NBA) and a year in the Greek Basket League midway through his career. With nearly 1,200 games in the NBA, he scored the second-most career points among players who never played in an NBA All-Star Game, behind Jamal Crawford. As of the 2025-26 season, he is ranked 66th in all-time points scored, and ranked seventh-most in points scored by an eligible player not in the Naismith Memorial Basketball Hall of Fame. As of 2019 he is the co-host of NBA Today, which airs weekdays on Sirius XM NBA Radio and also is the play-by-play TV analyst for the Phoenix Suns on Arizona's Family Sports.

== Early life and college career ==
After graduating from Chicago's Westinghouse High School, Johnson, a sharpshooting 6'7" forward/guard, attended the University of Illinois, majoring in history, before being selected by the Kansas City Kings in the 1981 NBA draft. Among Fighting Illini fans he is probably best remembered for his game-winning shot against Michigan State University (MSU). At the time, MSU, which was led by future all-time NBA great Earvin "Magic" Johnson, was undefeated and ranked #1 in the nation, but Illinois was also undefeated at 14–0. The victory gave Illinois a 15–0 record and the #2 ranking nationally (Illinois subsequently faded during regular season play, but MSU went on to become eventual National Champions).

Johnson was elected to the "Illini Men's Basketball All-Century Team" in 2004. Eddie Johnson was selected as a member of the 2019 class of the Illinois Athletics Hall of Fame.

== Playing career ==
Johnson would play for the Kings, the Phoenix Suns, the Seattle SuperSonics, the Charlotte Hornets, the Indiana Pacers, the Houston Rockets, and Greek team Olympiacos (1994–1995) before retiring from basketball in 1999. Although his 19,202 points over 1,199 NBA games was the 22nd-highest total in NBA history at the time of his retirement, Johnson was never selected to play in the All-Star game nor ever chosen for an All-NBA team. In fact, the "awards highlight" of his career occurred in 1989, when he received the NBA Sixth Man of the Year Award as a member of the Suns. Johnson's career point total of 19,202 is also higher than all but 30 inductees into the Naismith Memorial Basketball Hall of Fame.

=== Europe ===
Johnson also played for one year in the Greek Basket League, with the FIBA EuroLeague powerhouse Olympiacos Piraeus, in the 1994–95 season. He became a cult favorite with the fans of Olympiacos, for his phenomenal shooting from outside the 3-point line. One game in particular established his enduring legend for the club's fans, when he scored four 3-pointers in the final minutes of the low-scoring and tense semi-final of the league's 1995 Final Four, which was played against Panathinaikos Athens, the arch-rivals of Olympiacos. Olympiacos won that game by a score of 58–52, but lost in the EuroLeague Final to Real Madrid Teka. In 18 games played in the EuroLeague, Johnson averaged 21.9 points, 4.6 rebounds, 1.8 assists, and 0.7 steals, in 35.1 minutes per game.

Johnson did, however, taste success in the Greek Basket League, where he was instrumental in Olympiacos' 3–2 series win over Panathinaikos, in the Greek playoff finals of 1995. The fifth and vital game of that series, ended in one of the lowest-scoring games ever, as Olympiacos scraped a 45–44 victory, in a match that exhilarated the fans. In 35 games played in the Greek Basket League with Olympiacos, Johnson totaled averages of 21.2 points, 5.0 rebounds, 2.1 assists, and 1.0 steals, in 34 minutes per game, in the 1994–95 season.

=== Return to NBA ===
After his season overseas, he then returned to the NBA and started the 1995–96 season with the Indiana Pacers. He was traded to the Denver Nuggets on February 20, 1997, where he was quickly released. However, he signed with the Houston Rockets for the remainder of the season to where he returned for the following two seasons. Along with his Sixth Man of the Year Award, he is also remembered for hitting the game-winning three-pointer as time expired in a 95–92 Rockets win over the Utah Jazz in game 4 of the 1997 Western Conference Finals. Johnson would play an additional season for the Rockets and then 3 games the following season before finally retiring as a player.

== Post-NBA career ==
After his playing career was over, Johnson turned to broadcasting, serving as a color commentator for Arizona State, the WNBA's Phoenix Mercury, and then the Phoenix Suns. Johnson is also an accomplished motivational speaker, and he has recently released an instructional DVD called Eddie Johnson's Jumpshot and Offensive Skills. Johnson is also a regular article contributor to the website Hoopshype.com and also enjoys debating his ideas, opinions, and thoughts with his readers.

== Mistaken identity ==
In 2006, Eddie (Arnet) Johnson was mistaken in multiple media reports for former NBA player Edward (Lee) "Fast Eddie" Johnson (a guard, two-time NBA All-Star, one-time All-Defensive Second Team player, and four years older than Eddie A. Johnson) when the latter was arrested on suspicion of sexual assault of a minor and burglary on August 8 (Eddie L. Johnson would eventually be sentenced to life imprisonment for that crime and die in prison). While this was not the first time that Eddie L. Johnson had been arrested (by estimates, Johnson has been arrested 100 times), the heinousness of the crime, combined with the fact that it happened during the NBA offseason when Eddie A. Johnson would not normally be on TV, generated major controversy after other outlets failed to read the initial Associated Press story (which detailed correctly "Fast Eddie's" career and background) and put up the wrong Eddie Johnson's picture. Johnson called that day the "worst...of his life" and expressed concern that the case of mistaken identity might permanently sully his reputation. Johnson expressed to Jay Mariotti of the Chicago Sun-Times that he was considering legal action against the news outlets that used his picture or did not fact-check his identity against that of Edward Lee "Fast Eddie" Johnson.

== Honors ==
=== College basketball ===
- 1979 – Honorable Mention All-Big Ten
- 1980 – Team MVP
- 1980 – 2nd Team All-Big Ten
- 1981 – Team Captain
- 1981 – Team MVP
- 1981 – 1st Team All-Big Ten
- 2004 – Elected to the "Illini Men's Basketball All-Century Team"
- 2008 – Honored jersey which hangs in the State Farm Center to show regard for being the most decorated basketball players in the University of Illinois' history.
- 2019 – Inducted into the Illinois Athletics Hall of Fame

== Career statistics ==
=== NBA ===
Legend
GP	Games played	GS	Games started	MPG	Minutes per game
FG%	Field goal percentage	3P%	3-point field goal percentage	FT%	Free throw percentage
RPG	Rebounds per game	APG	Assists per game	SPG	Steals per game
BPG	Blocks per game	PPG	Points per game	**Bold**	Career high

==== Regular season ====
Year	Team	GP	GS	MPG	FG%	3P%	FT%	RPG	APG	SPG	BPG	PPG
1981–82	Kansas City	74	27	20.5	.459	.091	.664	4.4	1.5	.7	.2	9.3
1982–83	Kansas City	**82**	**82**	35.8	.494	.282	.779	**6.1**	2.6	.9	.2	19.8
1983–84	Kansas City	**82**	**82**	35.6	.485	.313	.810	5.5	**3.6**	.9	**.3**	21.9
1984–85	Kansas City	**82**	81	**36.9**	.491	.241	.871	5.0	3.3	**1.0**	**.3**	**22.9**
1985–86	Sacramento	**82**	30	30.7	.475	.200	.816	5.1	2.6	.7	.2	18.7
1986–87	Sacramento	81	30	30.3	.463	.314	.829	4.4	3.1	.5	.2	18.7
1987–88	Phoenix	73	59	29.8	.480	.255	.850	4.4	2.5	.5	.1	17.7
1988–89	Phoenix	70	7	29.2	**.497**	**.413**	.868	4.4	2.3	.7	.1	21.5
1989–90	Phoenix	64	4	28.3	.453	.380	**.917**	3.8	1.7	.5	.2	16.9
1990–91	Phoenix	15	0	20.8	.473	.286	.724	3.1	1.1	.6	.1	13.5
1990–91	Seattle	66	27	26.9	.486	.333	.912	3.4	1.4	.7	.1	17.4
1991–92	Seattle	81	19	29.2	.459	.252	.861	3.6	2.0	.7	.1	17.1
1992–93	Seattle	**82**	0	22.8	.467	.304	.911	3.3	1.6	.4	.0	14.4
1993–94	Charlotte	73	27	20.0	.459	.393	.780	3.1	1.7	.5	.1	11.5
1995–96	Indiana	62	1	16.2	.413	.352	.886	2.5	1.1	.3	.1	7.7
1996–97	Indiana	28	0	10.9	.434	.321	.741	1.4	.6	.2	.0	5.3
1996–97	Houston	24	2	25.3	.447	.388	.854	4.1	1.5	.4	.0	11.5
1997–98	Houston	75	1	19.9	.417	.333	.831	2.0	1.2	.4	.0	8.4
1998–99	Houston	3	0	6.0	.462	.000	—	.7	.3	.0	.0	4.0
Career		1,199	479	27.2	.472	.335	.840	4.0	2.1	.6	.2	16.0

==== Playoffs ====
Year	Team	GP	GS	MPG	FG%	3P%	FT%	RPG	APG	SPG	BPG	PPG
1984	Kansas City	3	—	**35.7**	.438	**.400**	**1.000**	3.3	**4.0**	1.0	**.3**	17.0
1986	Sacramento	3	1	32.0	.436	.000	.889	7.0	1.3	1.0	**.3**	18.7
1989	Phoenix	12	0	32.7	.413	.342	.769	**7.3**	2.1	1.0	.2	17.8
1990	Phoenix	16	0	21.1	.450	.395	.787	3.6	1.1	.6	**.3**	12.3
1991	Seattle	5	**5**	34.2	**.517**	.267	.828	4.2	1.4	**1.4**	.2	**24.0**
1992	Seattle	9	0	27.4	.474	.182	.941	3.0	.9	.3	**.3**	18.4
1993	Seattle	**19**	0	20.1	.390	.333	.935	2.4	.9	.2	.1	10.8
1996	Indiana	1	0	9.0	.000	.000		.0	1.0	.0	.0	.0
1997	Houston	16	0	17.8	.410	.298	.958	2.3	.6	.3	.0	8.3
1998	Houston	5	0	17.8	.333	.300	.875	1.6	.2	.0	.0	5.6
Career		89	6	23.8	.429	.310	.864	3.5	1.1	.5	.1	13.1

=== FIBA European League ===
Legend
GP	Games played	GS	Games started	MPG	Minutes per game
FG%	Field-goal percentage	3P%	3-point field-goal percentage	FT%	Free-throw percentage
RPG	Rebounds per game	APG	Assists per game	SPG	Steals per game
BPG	Blocks per game	PPG	Points per game	PIR	Performance index rating
**Bold**	Career high

Year	Team	GP	GS	MPG	FG%	3P%	FT%	RPG	APG	SPG	BPG	PPG	PIR
1994–95	Olympiacos	18	—	35.1	.432	.387	.850	4.6	1.8	.7	.0	21.9	—

=== College ===
Year	Team	GP	GS	MPG	FG%	3P%	FT%	RPG	APG	SPG	BPG	PPG
1977–78	Illinois	27	3	17.4	.427	—	.741	3.1	.6	.4	.3	8.1
1978–79	Illinois	30	27	26.2	.415	—	.531	5.7	1.7	.6	.1	12.1
1979–80	Illinois	35	35	34.7	.462	—	.655	8.9	2.0	.4	.2	17.4
1980–81	Illinois	29	29	34.8	.494	—	.756	9.2	2.4	1.0	.2	17.2
Career		121	94	28.8	.454	—	.671	6.9	1.7	.6	.2	14.0
