= Joe Barry Carroll =

American basketball player (born 1958)

Personal information
- Born: July 24, 1958 (age 68) Pine Bluff, Arkansas, U.S.
- Listed height: 7 ft 0 in (2.13 m)
- Listed weight: 225 lb (102 kg)

Career information
- High school: East (Denver, Colorado)
- College: Purdue (1976–1980)
- NBA draft: 1980: 1st round, 1st overall pick
- Drafted by: Golden State Warriors
- Playing career: 1980–1991
- Position: Center
- Number: 2, 11

Career history
- 1980–1984: Golden State Warriors
- 1984–1985: Simac Milano
- 1985–1987: Golden State Warriors
- 1987–1988: Houston Rockets
- 1988–1990: New Jersey Nets
- 1990: Denver Nuggets
- 1991: Phoenix Suns

Career highlights
- NBA All-Star (1987); NBA All-Rookie First Team (1981); Italian Serie A champion (1985); FIBA Korać Cup (1985); Consensus first-team All-American (1980); Third-team All-American – AP, NABC (1979); 2× First-team All-Big Ten (1979, 1980)

Career NBA statistics
- Points: 12,455 (17.7 ppg)
- Rebounds: 5,404 (7.7 rpg)
- Blocks: 1,121 (1.6 bpg)
- Stats at NBA.com
- Stats at Basketball Reference
Medals
Representing United States
Men's basketball
World Invitational Tournament
Gold medal – first place	1978 United States	Men's Basketball

Joe Barry Carroll (born July 24, 1958) is an American former professional basketball player and author who spent ten seasons in the National Basketball Association (NBA). After retiring from basketball, he became a wealth advisor, philanthropist, artist, author of the memoir Growing Up... In Words and Images, and recipient of the Hank Aaron Champion for Justice award.

== High school career ==
Carroll, a 7'0" center, attended Denver East High School, located in Denver, Colorado, where he was selected as an All-American by Midwest Coach and Athlete Magazine. In his senior year, he averaged 20.3 points and 12.2 rebounds a game, while scoring 41 points in one contest.

== College career ==
=== 1976–77 ===
After high school, Carroll moved on to play college basketball at Purdue University. Under head coach Fred Schaus, he helped lead the Boilermakers to a 20–8 record. In Carroll's first national televised appearance, against Indiana, he scored 12 points, had 6 rebounds and 3 blocks in 20 minutes coming off the bench in an 86–76 win. On December 10, 1977, vs. Arizona he recorded the school's only triple-double with 16 points, 16 rebounds and a single-game school record 11 blocks. He also set a McKale Center single-game arena record that stood until February 2000. He recorded 206 rebounds and averaged 7.4 a game in his first season, the most for a Purdue freshman. Carroll also holds the freshman record for most blocks in a season with 82.

=== 1977–78 ===
Carroll set school records with 105 blocks on the season and averaged 3.9 blocks per game as a sophomore. With senior Walter Jordan, he helped lead the team to a 16–11 record and a fourth-place finish in conference play.

=== 1978–79 ===
Head coach Fred Schaus stepped down in 1978 and was replaced by Lee Rose. Playing with a slowed down, controlled system compared to Schaus' fast-pace style, Carroll and senior point guard Jerry Sichting led Purdue to a first place Big Ten tie with an Earvin Johnson-led Michigan State. Not receiving the favor of the two teams to advance to the NCAA Tournament, Carroll led Purdue to the NIT Finals his junior year, losing to in-state rivals, Indiana; he scored 126 points in five tourney games and was named to the "All-NIT" team. He averaged 22.8 points a game on the season and was named First Team All-Big Ten and a Third Team All-America, while leading the Boilers to a 27–8 record. He grabbed a school record 352 rebounds on the season.

=== 1979–80 ===
During his senior year, he led the Boilermakers to an NCAA Final Four appearance, losing to UCLA in the semi-finals. They won the consolation game against Iowa, where Carroll scored a game-high 35 points in his last game as a Boilermaker. Leading Purdue to a 23–10 record on the season, he was named a First Team All-American and a second straight First Team All-Big Ten selection. He played 1,235 minutes on the season, the most by any player in school history.

=== College notes ===
Carroll holds the all-time school record for career blocks (349) and is second in school history for rebounds (1,148) to Zach Edey. With 2,175 points in his Purdue career, he ranks third behind Rick Mount and Zach Edey. He majored in economics at Purdue University.

== Professional career ==
=== Golden State Warriors ===
==== 1980–1981 ====
Carroll was selected by the Golden State Warriors with the first overall pick of the 1980 NBA draft. The Warriors traded Robert Parish and the draft choice used to select Kevin McHale to the Boston Celtics for the first overall pick used to select Carroll. Golden State's decision to part with two future hall-of-famers, who would both go on to win multiple NBA Finals with Boston, would affect public perception of Carroll throughout his career. He averaged 18.9 points and 9.3 rebounds as a rookie, and also scored a season high of 46 points and led the Warriors with 121 blocks during the season while being named an NBA All-Rookie First Team selection.

==== 1981–1984 ====
Two seasons later, he averaged a career high 24.1 points to go along with 8.7 rebounds. On March 5, 1983, he scored a career-best 52 points against the Utah Jazz.

Carroll's tenure with the Warriors was tumultuous, and he was criticized for a lack of effort, even being nicknamed "Joe Barely Cares" and "Just Barely Carroll." To the surprise of many, Carroll left the Warriors in 1984 to play in Italy for Simac Milano. With Simac Milano, he won the Italian League Championship, was selected to the All-League team, and won the FIBA Korać Cup.

==== 1985–1987 ====
He returned to the NBA for the 1985–86 season and averaged 21.2 points for two consecutive seasons under head coach George Karl. On February 1, 1987, Carroll scored 43 points and grabbed 24 rebounds in a 150-147 four-overtime victory against the New Jersey Nets. He was later named to the 1987 NBA All-Star Game, where he scored 4 points and had 6 rebounds in 18 minutes. Carroll played in his first playoff game against the Utah Jazz in the 1987 NBA Playoffs. Carroll helped lead the team past the Jazz and to the Western Conference Semifinals, where despite him averaging 20 points, 4.8 rebounds and 1.6 blocks, Golden State lost to the eventual champion Los Angeles Lakers.

Carroll is a top ten career franchise leader in defensive rebounds (3rd), offensive rebounds (4th), points per game (8th), total points (9th) and steals (9th). He scored at least 1,000 points in each of his seasons as a Warrior. He left Golden State as the franchise leader in blocks with 837, which is currently the second most behind Adonal Foyle's 1,090 from 1997 to 2007.

=== Houston Rockets ===
==== 1987–1988 ====
After his last full season with the Warriors in 1986–87, his production began to decline. In December 1987, he was traded with Sleepy Floyd to the Houston Rockets for Ralph Sampson and Steve Harris to play under head coach Bill Fitch. Carroll averaged just 12.7 points during that season, after averaging 20 or more in the previous four. He helped lead the Rockets to an NBA Playoff appearance, where the team lost to the Dallas Mavericks in the first round.

=== Later career ===
==== 1988–1991 ====
Carroll was traded to the New Jersey Nets for the 1988–89 season alongside Lester Conner for Tony Brown, Lorenzo Romar, Tim McCormick and Frank Johnson. In New Jersey, Carroll averaged 14.1 points a game and shot 80 percent from the free throw line. He was traded in the middle of the 1989–90 season to the Denver Nuggets for Michael Cutright on February 21, 1990, where he averaged 10 points a game and appeared in the first round of the 1990 NBA Playoffs, losing to the San Antonio Spurs. Joe Barry Carroll played his last NBA season for the Phoenix Suns. Only playing in 11 games and averaging 3.4 points, he shot a career high .917 from the line.

=== Career notes ===
Carroll retired from the NBA in 1991. He ended his career with totals of 12,455 points and 5,404 rebounds, topping 20+ points a game in scoring for 4 seasons. He appeared in 19 playoff games, where he averaged 27 minutes, 5 rebounds and 13.7 points per game.

Over his career, he averaged 17.7 points, 7.7 rebounds, 1.8 assists, 1 steal, 1.6 blocks per game, with a .474 field goal and .747 free throw percentage in 705 games. He averaged 32 minutes of playing time per game.

== NBA career statistics ==
Legend
GP	Games played	GS	Games started	MPG	Minutes per game
FG%	Field goal percentage	3P%	3-point field goal percentage	FT%	Free throw percentage
RPG	Rebounds per game	APG	Assists per game	SPG	Steals per game
BPG	Blocks per game	PPG	Points per game	**Bold**	Career high

=== Regular season ===
Year	Team	GP	GS	MPG	FG%	3P%	FT%	RPG	APG	SPG	BPG	PPG
1980–81	Golden State	**82**	—	35.6	.491	.000	.716	**9.3**	1.4	0.6	1.5	18.9
1981–82	Golden State	76	75	34.6	**.519**	.000	.728	8.3	0.8	0.8	1.7	17.0
1982–83	Golden State	79	79	**37.8**	.513	.000	.719	8.7	2.1	**1.4**	**2.0**	**24.1**
1983–84	Golden State	80	80	37.0	.477	.000	.723	8.0	2.5	1.3	1.8	20.5
1985–86	Golden State	79	79	35.5	.463	.000	.752	8.5	2.2	1.3	1.8	21.2
1986–87	Golden State	81	81	33.6	.472	–	.787	7.3	**2.6**	1.1	1.5	21.2
1987–88	Golden State	14	14	29.1	.378	.000	.797	6.6	1.4	0.9	1.8	15.5
1987–88	Houston	63	16	25.3	.452	.000	.748	6.3	1.5	0.6	1.3	12.0
1988–89	New Jersey	64	62	31.2	.448	–	.800	7.4	1.6	1.1	1.3	14.1
1989–90	New Jersey	46	20	21.8	.393	.000	.794	5.4	0.9	0.4	1.2	8.8
1989–90	Denver	30	27	24.0	.432	–	.743	6.4	1.8	0.9	**2.0**	11.9
1990–91	Phoenix	11	0	8.7	.361	–	**.917**	2.2	1.0	0.1	0.7	3.4
Career		705	533	32.4	.474	.000	.747	7.7	1.8	1.0	1.6	17.7
All-Star		1	0	18.0	.143	–	1.000	6.0	0.0	0.0	1.0	4.0

=== Playoffs ===
Year	Team	GP	GS	MPG	FG%	3P%	FT%	RPG	APG	SPG	BPG	PPG
1987	Golden State	**10**	**10**	**33.4**	.454	.000	.804	**6.5**	**1.9**	**1.4**	**2.5**	**18.9**
1988	Houston	4	4	29.0	.383	–	.800	4.8	0.5	0.8	0.3	11.0
1990	Denver	3	3	15.3	**.563**	–	**1.000**	3.0	1.0	0.3	1.7	6.7
1991	Phoenix	2	0	7.5	.500	–	.000	0.5	1.0	0.0	0.5	4.0
Career		19	17	26.9	.449	.000	.797	4.9	1.4	0.9	1.7	13.7

== After retirement ==
Carroll is currently an investment advisor, author, and painter living outside of Atlanta.

At the age of 26, Carroll established the BroadView Foundation to financially support and participate in organizations and programs that serve lower socio-economic groups and individuals in communities of color. In addition to establishing college scholarships, Carroll and BroadView have funded afterschool programs, elder care, Aid to Children of Imprisoned Mothers, True Colors Theatre, Task Force for the Homeless, and Georgia Innocence Project.

In 2013, Carroll expanded his support of the Georgia Innocence Project by fully funding the salary for a full-time staff position. All proceeds from Joe Barry Carroll Publishing are donated to selected nonprofit entities including the Georgia Innocence Project.

In 1993, he founded The Carroll Group, a wealth advisory company located in Atlanta. Carroll advises high-net-worth families and professional athletes.

Carroll has published books under the Joe Barry Carroll Publishing imprint. "Coach Lee Rose: On Family and Basketball" was published in 2021. "My View From Seven Feet" (2019) includes his paintings and narratives. "Black American Voices: Shared Culture Values and Emotions" includes art from the Tony & Betty Zamora Collection of African Art was published in 2017. "Growing Up . . . In Words and Images" a memoir, coffee table book that contains paintings by Carroll and narratives about life as the tenth of 13 children growing up in Pine Bluff, Arkansas and Denver, Colorado, life in the NBA and creating a fulfilling life after retiring from professional basketball. The book has received praise from Tony Award winning Broadway stage, Television and Film Director Kenny Leon; Emory University Associate Professor of Art History and African American Studies, Michael D. Harris; Atlanta Daily World Publisher, M. Alexis Scott; and WABE/NPR Director of Arts and Cultural Programming, Lois Reitzes.

In 2014 Carroll received the Hank Aaron Champion for Justice award from the Atlanta Braves and the National Center for Civil and Human Rights in recognition of his ongoing philanthropy and activism.

== See also ==
- List of NCAA Division I men's basketball players with 2,000 points and 1,000 rebounds
