= Tim Perry =

American basketball player (born 1965)

Personal information
- Born: June 4, 1965 (age 61) Freehold, New Jersey, U.S.
- Listed height: 6 ft 9 in (2.06 m)
- Listed weight: 201 lb (91 kg)

Career information
- High school: Freehold (Freehold, New Jersey)
- College: Temple (1984–1988)
- NBA draft: 1988: 1st round, 7th overall pick
- Drafted by: Phoenix Suns
- Playing career: 1988–2001
- Position: Power forward / center
- Number: 34, 23

Career history
- 1988–1992: Phoenix Suns
- 1992–1995: Philadelphia 76ers
- 1995–1996: New Jersey Nets
- 1996–1997: Ourense
- 1997–1998: Pamesa Valencia
- 1998–1999: León
- 1999–2000: TDK Manresa
- 2000–2001: Cáceres

Career highlights
- Copa del Rey winner (1998); Atlantic 10 Player of the Year (1988); 2× First-team All-Atlantic 10 (1987, 1988); Second-team All-Atlantic 10 (1986)

Career NBA statistics
- Points: 3,283 (6.8 ppg)
- Rebounds: 1,911 (4.0 rpg)
- Stats at NBA.com
- Stats at Basketball Reference

Timothy D. Perry (born June 4, 1965) is an American former professional basketball player. Following his college career with the Temple Owls he played professionally for 13 seasons in the National Basketball Association (NBA) and Liga ACB.

== Playing career ==
Perry played college basketball for Temple University from 1984 to 1988 and left as the schools leader in blocks with 392. He was selected seventh overall by the Phoenix Suns in the 1988 NBA draft. Through eight NBA seasons, he averaged 6.8 points and 4 rebounds per game. Charles Barkley claims in Sir Charles: The Wit and Wisdom of Charles Barkley that the Suns had to trade Perry to Philadelphia in 1992 because he was #34, Barkley's number. Perry appeared in three NBA Slam Dunk Contests, finishing 5th in 1989, 7th in 1993, and 5th in 1995.

On February 7, 1994, while playing for the 76ers, Perry made seven 3-pointers (in 15 attempts) in a 125–117 victory over the Charlotte Hornets - after having made only 15 3-pointers total in his first five seasons in the league. He finished the game with 31 points, which remained his career high throughout his time in the NBA.

For the 1996–1997 season, he moved over to Spain where he spent the next five seasons in the Liga ACB. In 1998, he won the Copa del Rey de Baloncesto with Pamesa Valencia.

== Later life ==
Perry later became an assistant coach for Holy Family University, Pennsylvania of the Central Atlantic Collegiate Conference in NCAA Division II. In 2011, he received a degree in liberal studies from Neumann University.

On the October 25, 2017 broadcast of NBA Gametime on the NBA Channel, Shaquille O'Neal claimed that he had been "dunked on" only three times in his 20-year NBA career. Shaq said he had been dunked on by Michael Jordan, Derrick Coleman, and Tim Perry.

== Career statistics ==
Legend
GP	Games played	GS	Games started	MPG	Minutes per game
FG%	Field goal percentage	3P%	3-point field goal percentage	FT%	Free throw percentage
RPG	Rebounds per game	APG	Assists per game	SPG	Steals per game
BPG	Blocks per game	PPG	Points per game	**Bold**	Career high

=== NBA ===
==== Regular season ====
Year	Team	GP	GS	MPG	FG%	3P%	FT%	RPG	APG	SPG	BPG	PPG
1988–89	Phoenix	62	15	9.9	**.537**	.250	.615	2.1	.3	.3	.5	4.1
1989–90	Phoenix	60	18	10.2	.513	**1.000**	.587	2.5	.3	.4	.4	4.2
1990–91	Phoenix	46	2	12.8	.521	.000	.614	2.7	.6	.5	.9	4.2
1991–92	Phoenix	80	**69**	**31.0**	.523	.375	**.712**	**6.9**	**1.7**	.6	**1.5**	**12.3**
1992–93	Philadelphia	**81**	51	26.0	.468	.204	.710	5.0	1.6	.5	1.1	9.0
1993–94	Philadelphia	80	68	29.2	.435	.365	.580	5.1	1.2	**.8**	1.0	9.0
1994–95	Philadelphia	42	1	10.6	.346	.000	.550	2.1	.3	.2	.4	1.8
1995–96	Philadelphia	8	0	10.9	.444	**1.000**	.667	1.6	.3	.3	.4	2.4
1995–96	New Jersey	22	1	7.6	.489	.429	.500	1.6	.3	.1	.5	2.4
Career		481	225	19.6	.485	.318	.648	4.0	.9	.5	.9	6.8

==== Playoffs ====
Year	Team	GP	GS	MPG	FG%	3P%	FT%	RPG	APG	SPG	BPG	PPG
1989	Phoenix	4	0	4.3	.500	–	.000	.5	.0	**.5**	.3	1.0
1990	Phoenix	**11**	0	9.1	.520	–	.444	1.9	.2	.3	.5	3.1
1992	Phoenix	8	**8**	**23.1**	**.603**	–	**.719**	**4.9**	**1.4**	.4	**.8**	**12.4**
Career		23	8	13.1	.576	–	.596	2.7	.6	.3	.6	6.0
