= Ed Nealy =

American basketball player (born 1960)

Personal information
- Born: February 19, 1960 (age 66) Pittsburg, Kansas, U. S.
- Listed height: 6 ft 7 in (2.01 m)
- Listed weight: 253 lb (115 kg)

Career information
- High school: Bonner Springs (Bonner Springs, Kansas)
- College: Kansas State (1978–1982)
- NBA draft: 1982: 8th round, 166th overall pick
- Drafted by: Kansas City Kings
- Playing career: 1982–1993
- Position: Power forward
- Number: 20, 32, 45, 55

Career history
- 1982–1984: Kansas City Kings
- 1984–1985: Sarasota Stingers
- 1985: Kansas City Kings
- 1985–1986: Tampa Bay Thrillers
- 1986–1988: San Antonio Spurs
- 1988: Chicago Bulls
- 1988–1989: Phoenix Suns
- 1989–1990: Chicago Bulls
- 1990–1992: Phoenix Suns
- 1992–1993: Golden State Warriors
- 1993: Chicago Bulls

Career highlights
- NBA champion (1993); CBA champion (1986); First-team All-Big Eight (1982); Big Eight Newcomer of the Year (1979)
- Stats at NBA.com
- Stats at Basketball Reference

Eddie Carl Nealy (born February 19, 1960) is an American former basketball player. At 6'7" and 238 pounds, he played as a power forward. After a standout college career, during which he won the Big Eight tournament title in 1980, he went on to play professionally for 11 years. During his professional career, he won the Continental Basketball Association championship in 1986 as a member of the Tampa Bay Thrillers and the NBA championship in 1993 as a member of the Chicago Bulls.

== College career ==
Born in Pittsburg, Kansas, Nealy attended Kansas State University. Although he was not expected to be a factor for the Wildcats as a freshman, he started 30 of the team's 31 games, averaging 10.2 points and team leading 8.2 rebounds per game en route to Big Eight Newcomer of the Year honors. During his sophomore season, he was a vital part in helping the team win the 1980 Big Eight tournament championship and reach the Elite Eight of the 1980 NCAA Tournament after averaging 9.8 points and 8.8 rebounds per game. As a junior, he averaged 11.0 points and 9.1 rebounds, helping the Wildcats reach the West Regional Finals. During his senior season, he averaged 11.3 points and 8.7 rebounds per game, and led the Wildcats to Sweet 16 of the NCAA Tournament and earned first team All-Big Eight and honorable mention All-America honors.

== Professional career ==
After his college career ended, Nealy was selected by the Kansas City Kings in the eighth round of the 1982 NBA draft. In 10 NBA seasons with the Kings, San Antonio Spurs, Chicago Bulls, Phoenix Suns and Golden State Warriors, Nealy averaged 2.7 points and 3.3 rebounds.

Nealy played two seasons in the Continental Basketball Association, averaging 9.8 points and 10.0 rebounds in 68 games. During the 1986 playoffs, he averaged 12.9 points and 15.5 rebounds for the Tampa Bay Thrillers, helping them to the CBA championship.

During his multiple stints in Chicago, Nealy became a fan-favorite (and a favorite of coach Phil Jackson) for his hustle and hard work ethic, especially during the 1990 NBA playoffs during stints where Scottie Pippen and Bill Cartwright were injured or struggling during the game. During his last season, Nealy was a late addition to the Chicago Bulls team which won the 1993 NBA Championship, although he did not play during the playoffs. He retired following the finals.

== Player profile ==
Due to his hustle, aggressiveness and court smarts, Nealy received positive feedback for his unselfish play and willingness to be physical throughout his career.

During Nealy's college playing career, Dean Smith, head coach of the North Carolina Tar Heels at the time, said about Nealy in anticipation of the Elite Eight game his team would play against Nealy's Kansas State Wildcats, "With some players, a rebound hits their hand and bounces off. Nealy catches it. He has hands like Bobby Jones and Adrian Dantley. He is going to be a great pro some day. I truly mean that."

Phil Jackson, who coached Nealy while he played for the Bulls in the 1989-90 and 1992-93 seasons, remarked, "It's guys like Ed who make coaching a pleasure. If you give me a reason to put him into a game, he's going to find a way to contribute." The book The Jordan Rules features Phil Jackson labelling Nealy as his "favorite player, smartest player on the team."

== Personal life ==
Nealy's son, Spencer, played football at Texas A&M University.

== Career statistics ==
Legend
GP	Games played	GS	Games started	MPG	Minutes per game
FG%	Field goal percentage	3P%	3-point field goal percentage	FT%	Free throw percentage
RPG	Rebounds per game	APG	Assists per game	SPG	Steals per game
BPG	Blocks per game	PPG	Points per game	**Bold**	Career high
†	Won an NBA championship

=== NBA ===
==== Regular season ====
Year	Team	GP	GS	MPG	FG%	3P%	FT%	RPG	APG	SPG	BPG	PPG
1982–83	Kansas City	**82**	**61**	**20.0**	.595	–	.614	**5.9**	.8	**.8**	.1	**4.4**
1983–84	Kansas City	71	1	13.5	.500	–	.800	3.1	.7	.6	.1	2.5
1984–85	Kansas City	22	0	10.1	.591	–	.526	2.0	.8	.1	.0	2.8
1986–87	San Antonio	60	7	16.3	.438	.129	.739	4.7	**1.4**	.7	**.2**	3.7
1987–88	San Antonio	68	1	12.3	.459	**.500**	.651	3.3	.7	.4	.1	2.1
1988–89	Chicago	13	0	7.2	**.714**	–	.500	1.8	.5	.2	.1	.8
1988–89	Phoenix	30	0	5.6	.276	.000	.429	1.8	.3	.1	.0	.6
1989–90	Chicago	46	0	10.9	.529	.000	.732	3.0	.6	.3	.1	2.3
1990–91	Phoenix	55	0	10.4	.464	.313	.737	2.7	.7	.4	.1	2.2
1991–92	Phoenix	52	4	9.7	.512	.400	.667	2.1	.7	.3	.0	3.1
1992–93	Golden State	30	4	7.6	.348	.318	.700	1.6	.4	.3	.0	1.5
1992–93†	Chicago	11	0	7.2	.435	.200	**1.000**	1.5	.2	.3	.1	2.1
Career		540	78	12.6	.498	.292	.684	3.3	.7	.5	.1	2.7

==== Playoffs ====
Year	Team	GP	GS	MPG	FG%	3P%	FT%	RPG	APG	SPG	BPG	PPG
1984	Kansas City	2	–	9.5	**1.000**	–	**1.000**	3.0	1.0	.0	.0	3.0
1988	San Antonio	2	0	**18.0**	.500	–	–	**3.5**	**2.0**	.5	.0	2.0
1989	Phoenix	4	0	1.5	.333	–	–	.8	.0	.0	.0	.5
1990	Chicago	**15**	0	15.2	.472	.000	.619	**3.5**	.3	**.7**	**.1**	**3.1**
1991	Phoenix	2	0	10.0	.200	.000	–	2.5	.0	.0	.0	1.0
1992	Phoenix	8	0	8.4	.389	**.385**	**1.000**	2.3	.5	.4	.0	2.9
Career		33	0	11.4	.441	.333	.704	2.8	.5	.4	.0	2.5
