= Mike Morrison (basketball, born 1967) =

American basketball player

Personal information
- Born: August 16, 1967 (age 59) Washington, D.C., U.S.
- Listed height: 6 ft 4 in (1.93 m)
- Listed weight: 195 lb (88 kg)

Career information
- High school: Northwestern (Hyattsville, Maryland)
- College: Loyola (Maryland) (1985–1989)
- NBA draft: 1989: 2nd round, 51st overall pick
- Drafted by: Phoenix Suns
- Playing career: 1989–2000
- Position: Shooting guard
- Number: 32

Career history
- 1989–1990: Phoenix Suns
- 1990–1991: Wichita Falls Texans
- 1992–1994: Shell Rimula X

Career highlights
- CBA champion (1991); First-team All-ECAC North (1988); First-team All-NEC (1989)
- Stats at NBA.com
- Stats at Basketball Reference

Michael Fitzgerald Morrison (born August 16, 1967) is an American former professional basketball player. A product of Loyola College in Maryland, he is the school's first Division I-era player to have been selected in the NBA draft, the second Loyola Greyhound drafted being Santi Aldama in 2021.

Morrison played in the National Basketball Association (NBA) for the Phoenix Suns during the 1989–90 season. Following his rookie season, in which he played 36 games and started once, he was released by the Suns and signed with the Washington Bullets who would soon release him. He played in the Continental Basketball Association, and also had a brief training-camp stint with the Orlando Magic in 1990–91 before going overseas to the Philippine Basketball Association. He came back to the States in late 1991 to play in the Global Basketball Association for the Raleigh Bullfrogs alongside Chris Corchiani.

In 2007, Morrison retired from playing professionally in order to complete his degree at George Mason. The school inducted him into the Loyola Hall of Fame in 2014.
