= Mark West (basketball) =

American basketball player (born 1960)

Personal information
- Born: November 5, 1960 (age 66) Fort Campbell, Kentucky, U.S.
- Listed height: 6 ft 10 in (2.08 m)
- Listed weight: 230 lb (104 kg)

Career information
- High school: Petersburg (Petersburg, Virginia)
- College: Old Dominion (1979–1983)
- NBA draft: 1983: 2nd round, 30th overall pick
- Drafted by: Dallas Mavericks
- Playing career: 1983–2000
- Position: Center
- Number: 45, 43, 41

Career history

Playing
- 1983–1984: Dallas Mavericks
- 1984: Milwaukee Bucks
- 1984–1988: Cleveland Cavaliers
- 1988–1994: Phoenix Suns
- 1994–1996: Detroit Pistons
- 1996–1997: Cleveland Cavaliers
- 1997–1998: Indiana Pacers
- 1999: Atlanta Hawks
- 1999–2000: Phoenix Suns

Coaching
- 2013–2015: Phoenix Suns (assistant)

Career highlights
- No. 45 retired by Old Dominion Monarchs

Career NBA statistics
- Points: 6,259 (5.7 ppg)
- Rebounds: 5,347 (4.9 rpg)
- Blocks: 1,403 (1.3 bpg)
- Stats at NBA.com
- Stats at Basketball Reference
Medals
Representing United States
World Championships
Silver medal – second place	1982 Colombia	National team

Mark Andre West (born November 5, 1960) is an American former professional basketball player. A center from Old Dominion University, West was selected by the Dallas Mavericks in the second round (30th overall) of the 1983 NBA draft.

== Early life ==
West was born in Fort Campbell, Kentucky, and was raised in Petersburg, Virginia. He attended Petersburg High School.

== College ==
West played four years at Old Dominion University (ODU) where he hauled down 1,113 career rebounds, shot 56 percent from the floor and scored 1,308 career points. In 1980 and 1982 West was named ECAC-South Tournament Most Valuable Player. He also led the nation in blocked shots in 1980 and 1981 and completed his career with 446 career blocks for a 3.8 per game average. He was declared an All-American three times.

West performed three triple doubles (points, rebounds, blocked shots). He had 12 points, 13 rebounds and 10 blocks on October 4, 1980. West then had 16 points, 10 rebounds and 10 blocked shots against Wagner on Jan. 9, 1982. On Feb. 17, 1982, he scored 14 points with 11 rebounds and 10 blocks. West is ODU's career double-double leader (points and rebounds) with 50. On Jan. 10, 1981, West help lead the Monarchs to a 63–62 upset win over then undefeated and number one ranked DePaul, in Chicago. During his four seasons at ODU, the Monarchs compiled an 80–37 record with two NCAA and two NIT appearances.

West graduated in 1983 with a degree in business administration with an emphasis on financial management, although he originally planned to focus on accounting.

=== College statistics ===
Legend
GP	Games played	GS	Games started	MPG	Minutes per game
FG%	Field goal percentage	3P%	3-point field goal percentage	FT%	Free throw percentage
RPG	Rebounds per game	APG	Assists per game	SPG	Steals per game
BPG	Blocks per game	PPG	Points per game	**Bold**	Career high

Year	Team	GP	GS	MPG	FG%	3P%	FT%	RPG	APG	SPG	BPG	PPG
1979–80	Old Dominion	**30**	–	22.6	.475	–	.370	7.1	**1.0**	0.4	3.9	4.8
1980–81	Old Dominion	28	–	30.2	.527	–	**.578**	10.3	0.5	0.5	4.0	10.9
1981–82	Old Dominion	**30**	**30**	33.6	**.610**	–	.531	10.0	0.3	**0.7**	**4.1**	**15.7**
1982–83	Old Dominion	29	29	**34.7**	.569	–	.491	**10.8**	0.6	0.3	3.2	14.4
Career		117	59	30.2	.559	–	.514	9.5	0.6	0.5	3.8	11.4

== Career ==
=== As basketball player ===
West was drafted by the Dallas Mavericks in the 1983 NBA draft in the second round with the 30th overall pick. West played 17 seasons in the NBA from 1983 to 2000 as a member of the Mavericks, Milwaukee Bucks, Cleveland Cavaliers, Phoenix Suns, Detroit Pistons, Indiana Pacers, and Atlanta Hawks. West was a key player on the Phoenix Suns team that lost to the Chicago Bulls in the 1993 NBA Finals.

West compiled 6,259 points and 5,347 rebounds in his NBA career and also ranks third all-time (behind Hall of Famers Artis Gilmore and Shaquille O'Neal) in career field-goal percentage (58.03%).

He played for the US national team in the 1982 FIBA World Championship, winning a silver medal.

=== Additional career in athletics ===
In 2001, West was hired by the Phoenix Suns as assistant general manager. On June 25, 2013, he was named an assistant coach to the Suns under head coach Jeff Hornacek. In 2015, he also became the team's Director of Player Relations while continuing to perform some coaching duties.

=== Other pursuits ===
West has been a licensed stockbroker since 1992 and in the 1990s became a partner at Prudential Securities in Phoenix.

== NBA career statistics ==
Legend
GP	Games played	GS	Games started	MPG	Minutes per game
FG%	Field goal percentage	3P%	3-point field goal percentage	FT%	Free throw percentage
RPG	Rebounds per game	APG	Assists per game	SPG	Steals per game
BPG	Blocks per game	PPG	Points per game	**Bold**	Career high
*	Led the league

=== Regular season ===
Year	Team	GP	GS	MPG	FG%	3P%	FT%	RPG	APG	SPG	BPG	PPG
1983–84	Dallas	34	0	5.9	.357	.000	.318	1.4	0.4	0.0	0.4	1.1
1984–85	Milwaukee	1	0	6.0	.000	.000	**1.000**	1.0	0.0	0.0	1.0	2.0
1984–85	Cleveland	65	25	13.6	.549	.000	.482	3.8	0.2	0.2	0.7	3.9
1985–86	Cleveland	67	26	17.5	.541	.000	.524	4.8	0.3	0.4	0.9	4.2
1986–87	Cleveland	78	13	17.1	.543	.000	.514	4.3	0.5	0.3	1.0	6.5
1987–88	Cleveland	54	12	21.9	.576	.000	.621	5.2	**0.9**	0.5	1.5	8.5
1987–88	Phoenix	29	29	**31.6**	.521	.000	.568	8.3	0.8	**0.8**	**2.3**	**11.8**
1988–89	Phoenix	**82***	32	24.6	**.653**	.000	.535	6.7	0.5	0.4	**2.3**	7.2
1989–90	Phoenix	**82***	79	29.3	.625*	.000	.691	**8.9**	0.5	0.4	2.2	10.5
1990–91	Phoenix	**82***	64	23.9	.647	.000	.655	6.9	0.5	0.4	2.0	7.7
1991–92	Phoenix	**82**	11	17.5	.632	.000	.637	4.5	0.3	0.2	1.0	6.1
1992–93	Phoenix	**82**	**82**	19.0	.614	.000	.518	5.6	0.4	0.2	1.3	5.3
1993–94	Phoenix	**82***	50	15.1	.566	.000	.500	3.6	0.4	0.4	1.3	4.7
1994–95	Detroit	67	58	23.0	.556	.000	.478	6.1	0.3	0.4	1.5	7.5
1995–96	Detroit	47	21	14.5	.484	.000	.622	2.8	0.1	0.1	0.8	3.2
1996–97	Cleveland	70	43	13.7	.556	.000	.482	2.7	0.3	0.2	0.8	3.2
1997–98	Indiana	15	1	7.0	.476	.000	.500	1.0	0.1	0.1	0.3	1.5
1998–99	Atlanta	49	0	10.2	.373	.000	.356	2.6	0.3	0.1	0.4	1.2
1999–00	Phoenix	22	2	5.8	.417	.000	.625	1.4	0.1	0.1	0.2	0.7
Career		1090	548	18.5	.580	.000	.568	4.9	0.4	0.3	1.3	5.7

=== Playoffs ===
Year	Team	GP	GS	MPG	FG%	3P%	FT%	RPG	APG	SPG	BPG	PPG
1983–84	Dallas	4	–	8.0	.556	.000	.667	1.8	0.8	0.0	0.8	3.0
1984–85	Cleveland	4	4	17.0	.600	.000	.400	4.5	**1.0**	0.5	0.0	2.0
1988–89	Phoenix	12	12	18.9	.640	.000	**.714**	4.4	0.5	**0.6**	1.6	6.2
1989–90	Phoenix	16	16	**34.0**	.577	.000	.540	**10.3**	0.3	0.3	**2.6**	**11.1**
1990–91	Phoenix	4	4	23.3	.600	.000	**.714**	4.5	0.5	0.5	2.5	5.8
1991–92	Phoenix	8	0	12.0	**.737**	.000	.500	2.1	0.3	0.3	0.5	4.0
1992–93	Phoenix	**24***	**24**	19.5	.544	.000	.609	4.1	0.5	0.2	1.4	4.8
1993–94	Phoenix	7	6	9.9	.333	.000	.700	2.9	0.0	0.0	1.0	2.4
1995–96	Detroit	3	3	26.0	.524	.000	.462	5.3	0.3	0.3	0.3	9.3
1997–98	Indiana	4	0	2.8	.500	.000	.333	0.3	0.0	0.0	0.0	0.8
1998–99	Atlanta	9	0	7.6	.300	.000	.500	1.0	0.2	0.2	0.1	0.9
Career		95	69	18.5	.566	.000	.577	4.4	0.4	0.3	1.3	5.2

== Honors and awards ==
In 1984, West's jersey number 45 was retired at his alma mater, Old Dominion University. He was inducted into the ODU Sports Hall of Fame in 1988. Old Dominion University honored West in 2000 as a distinguished alumnus.

West was inducted into the Virginia Sports Hall of Fame on April 22, 2006, and the Hampton Roads African American Sports Hall of Fame in October 2004.

- NBA field goal percentage leader (1990)

== Personal life ==
West and his wife Elaina have two sons, Markus and Markyle.

== See also ==
- List of NBA career blocks leaders
- List of NBA career field goal percentage leaders
