= Ricky Blanton =

American basketball player-coach (born 1966)

Personal information
- Born: April 21, 1966 (age 60) Miami, Florida, U.S.
- Listed height: 6 ft 7 in (2.01 m)
- Listed weight: 215 lb (98 kg)

Career information
- High school: Miami Killian (Miami, Florida)
- College: LSU (1984–1989)
- NBA draft: 1989: 2nd round, 46th overall pick
- Drafted by: Phoenix Suns
- Playing career: 1991–1995
- Position: Small forward
- Number: 17

Career history

Playing
- 1991–1992: Scaini Venezia
- 1992–1993: Wichita Falls Texans
- 1993: Chicago Bulls
- 1993: Sioux Falls Skyforce
- 1993–1994: Rapid City Thrillers
- 1993–1994: Châlons-en-Champagne
- 1994–1995: Quilmes de Mar del Plata

Coaching
- 1996–1997: LSU (assistant)
- 1997–1998: Utah State (assistant)
- 2002–2004: Nicholls State

Career highlights
- First-team All-SEC (1989); Second-team All-SEC (1988)
- Stats at NBA.com
- Stats at Basketball Reference

Ricky Wayne Blanton (born April 21, 1966) is an American former professional basketball player who was selected by the National Basketball Association's Phoenix Suns in the second round (46th pick overall) of the 1989 NBA draft. A 6'7" and 215 lb small forward from Louisiana State University (LSU), Blanton signed a 10-day contract and played in only two career NBA games for Chicago Bulls during the 1992–93 season in 18 point wins against the Sacramento Kings on Feb 15, 1993 and Utah Jazz on Feb 17, 1993 at the Chicago Stadium.

Blanton played in the 1986 Final Four as a member of the LSU Tigers.

== Coaching career ==
After coaching stints at LSU and Utah State, Blanton served as head men's basketball coach at Nicholls State University in Thibodaux, Louisiana from 2002 to 2004. He resigned shortly before the 2004–05 season.

== Head coaching record ==
Record table
Season	Team	Overall	Conference	Standing	Postseason
Nicholls State Colonels (Southland Conference) (2002–2004)
2002–03	Nicholls State	3–25	1–19	11th	
2003–04	Nicholls State	6–21	1–15	11th	
Nicholls State:		9–46 (.164)	2–34 (.056)		
Total:		9–46 (.164)			
National champion Postseason invitational champion Conference regular season champion Conference regular season and conference tournament champion Division regular season champion Division regular season and conference tournament champion Conference tournament champion

== Broadcasting career ==
Blanton served as the color analyst for the LSU Tigers basketball team from the 2009–2010 season through the 2016–2017 season.
