= 1990–91 San Antonio Spurs season =

- Division champions
- Head coach: Larry Brown
- General manager: Bob Bass
- Owner: Red McCombs
- Arena: HemisFair Arena

Results
- Record: 55–27 (.671)
- Place: Division: 1st (Midwest); Conference: 2nd (Western)
- Playoff finish: First round (lost to Warriors 1–3)
- Stats at Basketball Reference

Local media
- Television: Home Sports Entertainment, KSAT-TV
- Radio: WOAI, KCOR (Spanish)

The 1990–91 San Antonio Spurs season was the 15th season for the San Antonio Spurs in the National Basketball Association, and their 24th season as a franchise.

== Season summary ==
=== Off-season ===
During the off-season, the Spurs acquired Paul Pressey from the Milwaukee Bucks.

=== Regular season ===
With the addition of Pressey, and after a promising rookie season from second-year star David Robinson, the Spurs won 17 of their first 22 games of the regular season, which included an eight-game winning streak in December, and later on held a 32–13 record at the All-Star break. However, with Terry Cummings and Rod Strickland both out for parts of the season due to hand injuries, the team struggled in February with a 4–7 record. At mid-season, the team released Reggie Williams to free agency, and signed free agent Avery Johnson, who was previously released by the Denver Nuggets. The Spurs won 13 of their final 17 games of the season, and won the Midwest Division title with a solid 55–27 record, earning the second seed in the Western Conference.

Robinson averaged 25.6 points, 13.0 rebounds, 1.5 steals and 3.9 blocks per game, and was named to the All-NBA First Team, and to the NBA All-Defensive Second Team. In addition, Cummings averaged 17.6 points and 7.8 rebounds per game, while second-year forward Sean Elliott provided the team with 15.9 points and 5.6 rebounds per game, Willie Anderson contributed 14.4 points and 4.8 assists per game, and Strickland provided with 13.8 points, 8.0 assists and 2.0 steals per game. Off the bench, Pressey contributed 7.5 points and 3.9 assists per game, while Sidney Green averaged 6.7 points and 4.7 rebounds per game, David Wingate provided with 5.4 points per game, and Dave Greenwood averaged 3.8 points and 3.5 rebounds per game.

During the NBA All-Star weekend at the Charlotte Coliseum in Charlotte, North Carolina, Robinson was selected for the 1991 NBA All-Star Game, as a member of the Western Conference All-Star team. Robinson finished in third place in Most Valuable Player voting, behind Michael Jordan of the Chicago Bulls, and Magic Johnson of the Los Angeles Lakers; he also finished in second place in Defensive Player of the Year voting, behind Dennis Rodman of the Detroit Pistons, while Elliott finished tied in sixth place in Most Improved Player voting, and head coach Larry Brown finished tied in fifth place in Coach of the Year voting.

The Spurs finished tenth in the NBA in home-game attendance, with an attendance of 651,965 at the HemisFair Arena during the regular season.

=== NBA playoffs ===
In the Western Conference First Round of the 1991 NBA playoffs, the Spurs faced off against the 7th–seeded Golden State Warriors, who were led by the Run TMC trio of All-Star forward Chris Mullin, All-Star guard Tim Hardaway, and Mitch Richmond. The Spurs won Game 1 over the Warriors at home, 130–121 at the HemisFair Arena. However, the Spurs lost the next three games, which included a Game 4 loss to the Warriors on the road, 110–97 at the Oakland-Alameda County Coliseum Arena, thus losing the series in four games.

=== Notable highlights ===
On November 3, 1990, the Spurs hosted the Lakers on the premiere broadcast of the NBA on NBC; the Spurs defeated the Lakers at the HemisFair Arena, 110–99.

=== Aftermath ===
Following the season, David Wingate signed as a free agent with the Washington Bullets.

== Draft picks ==
Round	Pick	Player	Position	Nationality	College
1	24	Dwayne Schintzius	C	United States	Florida
2	43	Tony Massenburg	PF	United States	Maryland
2	54	Sean Higgins	SG/SF	United States	Michigan

== Roster ==
1990–91 San Antonio Spurs roster
Players

Pos.	No.	Player	Height	Weight	DOB	From
G	40	Willie Anderson	6 ft 7 in (2.01 m)	190 lb (86 kg)	1967–01–08	Georgia
F	34	Terry Cummings	6 ft 9 in (2.06 m)	220 lb (100 kg)	1961–03–15	DePaul
F	32	Sean Elliott	6 ft 8 in (2.03 m)	205 lb (93 kg)	1968–02–02	Arizona
F	21	Sidney Green	6 ft 9 in (2.06 m)	220 lb (100 kg)	1961–01–04	UNLV
F	3	Sean Higgins	6 ft 9 in (2.06 m)	205 lb (93 kg)	1968–12–30	Michigan
G	15	Avery Johnson	5 ft 10 in (1.78 m)	175 lb (79 kg)	1965–03–25	Southern
F	45	Tony Massenburg	6 ft 9 in (2.06 m)	220 lb (100 kg)	1967–07–31	Maryland
G	8	Paul Pressey	6 ft 5 in (1.96 m)	185 lb (84 kg)	1958–12–24	Tulsa
C	50	David Robinson	7 ft 1 in (2.16 m)	235 lb (107 kg)	1965–08–06	Navy
C	24	Dwayne Schintzius	7 ft 1 in (2.16 m)	260 lb (118 kg)	1968–10–14	Florida
G	1	Rod Strickland	6 ft 3 in (1.91 m)	175 lb (79 kg)	1966–07–11	DePaul
G	25	David Wingate	6 ft 5 in (1.96 m)	185 lb (84 kg)	1963–12–15	Georgetown

Coaches
Head coach
- Larry Brown
Assistant(s)
- R. C. Buford
- Gregg Popovich

Legend
- (DP) Unsigned draft pick
- (FA) Free agent
- (S) Suspended
- Injured

== Regular season ==
=== Season standings ===
Midwest Division	W	L	PCT	GB	Home	Road	Div
y-San Antonio Spurs	55	27	.671	—	33–8	22–19	20–8
x-Utah Jazz	54	28	.659	1	36–5	18–23	21-7
x-Houston Rockets	52	30	.634	3	31-10	21–20	20-8
Orlando Magic	31	51	.378	24	24-17	7–34	13–15
Minnesota Timberwolves	29	53	.354	26	21-20	8-33	9-19
Dallas Mavericks	28	54	.341	27	20-21	8–33	7-21
Denver Nuggets	20	62	.244	35	17-24	3-38	8–20

y - clinched division title
x - clinched playoff spot

#	Western Conference				
#	Team	W	L	PCT	GB
1	z-Portland Trail Blazers	63	19	.768	–
2	y-San Antonio Spurs	55	27	.671	8
3	x-Los Angeles Lakers	58	24	.707	5
4	x-Phoenix Suns	55	27	.671	8
5	x-Utah Jazz	54	28	.659	9
6	x-Houston Rockets	52	30	.634	11
7	x-Golden State Warriors	44	38	.537	19
8	x-Seattle SuperSonics	41	41	.500	22
9	Orlando Magic	31	51	.378	32
10	Los Angeles Clippers	31	51	.378	32
11	Minnesota Timberwolves	29	53	.354	34
12	Dallas Mavericks	28	54	.341	35
13	Sacramento Kings	25	57	.305	38
14	Denver Nuggets	20	62	.244	43

z - clinched division title
y - clinched division title
x - clinched playoff spot

== Game log ==
=== Regular season ===
1990–91 game log
Total: 55–27 (home: 33–8; road: 22–19)
November: 8–4 (home: 5–0; road: 3–4)

Game	Date	Team	Score	High points	High rebounds	High assists	Location Attendance	Record
1	November 3	L.A. Lakers	W 110–99				HemisFair Arena	1–0
2	November 7	Denver	W 161–153				HemisFair Arena	2–0
3	November 8	@ Utah	L 94–103				Salt Palace	2–1
4	November 10	Houston	W 111–110				HemisFair Arena	3–1
5	November 13	@ Golden State	L 124–128				Oakland–Alameda County Coliseum Arena	3–2
6	November 15	@ Sacramento	W 122–93				ARCO Arena	4–2
7	November 17	Phoenix	W 128–114				HemisFair Arena	5–2
8	November 21	Minnesota	W 114–100				HemisFair Arena	6–2
9	November 23	@ Dallas	W 107–104				Reunion Arena	7–2
10	November 25	@ Portland	L 103–117				Memorial Coliseum	7–3
11	November 27	@ Seattle	W 124–111				Seattle Center Coliseum	8–3
12	November 28	@ L.A. Lakers	L 80–97				Great Western Forum	8–4

December: 11–2 (home: 5–2; road: 6–0)

Game	Date	Team	Score	High points	High rebounds	High assists	Location Attendance	Record
13	December 1	Dallas	W 109–97				HemisFair Arena	9–4
14	December 5	Atlanta	L 108–110				HemisFair Arena	9–5
15	December 8	Boston	W 102–96				HemisFair Arena	10–5
16	December 11	@ Detroit	W 95–86				Palace of Auburn Hills	11–5
17	December 12	@ Charlotte	W 92–81				Charlotte Coliseum	12–5
18	December 14	@ Cleveland	W 116–106 (OT)				Richfield Coliseum	13–5
19	December 15	@ Minnesota	W 90–74				Target Center	14–5
20	December 18	@ Houston	W 96–95				The Summit	15–5
21	December 19	Denver	W 144–109				HemisFair Arena	16–5
22	December 21	@ Phoenix	W 132–128 (OT)				Arizona Veterans Memorial Coliseum	17–5
23	December 22	Milwaukee	L 98–114				HemisFair Arena	17–6
24	December 26	Miami	W 111–97				HemisFair Arena	18–6
25	December 28	Sacramento	W 104–88				HemisFair Arena	19–6

January: 12–5 (home: 8–1; road: 4–4)

Game	Date	Team	Score	High points	High rebounds	High assists	Location Attendance	Record
26	January 2	@ Indiana	L 109–121				Market Square Arena	19–7
27	January 4	@ New Jersey	W 93–89				Brendan Byrne Arena	20–7
28	January 5	@ Orlando	W 107–90				Orlando Arena	21–7
29	January 7	@ Philadelphia	W 111–102 (OT)				The Spectrum	22–7
30	January 8	@ Atlanta	L 98–109				The Omni	22–8
31	January 10	Orlando	W 117–111				HemisFair Arena	23–8
32	January 12	Utah	W 112–92				HemisFair Arena	24–8
33	January 15	@ Utah	L 102–124				Salt Palace	24–9
34	January 16	Dallas	W 100–94				HemisFair Arena	25–9
35	January 18	Charlotte	L 110–117				HemisFair Arena	25–10
36	January 19	@ Denver	W 117–108				McNichols Sports Arena	26–10
37	January 22	L.A. Clippers	W 106–100				HemisFair Arena	27–10
38	January 24	Cleveland	W 111–103				HemisFair Arena	28–10
39	January 26	Minnesota	W 112–105				HemisFair Arena	29–10
40	January 28	Seattle	W 119–107				HemisFair Arena	30–10
41	January 29	@ Houston	L 89–91				The Summit	30–11
42	January 31	Chicago	W 106–102				HemisFair Arena	31–11

February: 4–7 (home: 3–3; road: 1–4)

Game	Date	Team	Score	High points	High rebounds	High assists	Location Attendance	Record
43	February 2	Houston	L 94–100 (OT)				HemisFair Arena	31–12
44	February 5	Golden State	L 106–112				HemisFair Arena	31–13
45	February 7	Indiana	W 118–108				HemisFair Arena	32–13
46	February 12	Washington	W 102–92				HemisFair Arena	33–13
47	February 14	Phoenix	L 97–106				HemisFair Arena	33–14
48	February 16	@ Dallas	L 94–96				Reunion Arena	33–15
49	February 18	@ Utah	L 81–104				Salt Palace	33–16
50	February 22	@ L.A. Clippers	L 101–107				Los Angeles Memorial Sports Arena	33–17
51	February 24	@ Portland	W 95–88				Memorial Coliseum	34–17
52	February 26	Portland	W 102–101 (OT)				HemisFair Arena	35–17
53	February 28	@ New York	L 93–100				Madison Square Garden	35–18

March: 12–5 (home: 9–0; road: 3–5)

Game	Date	Team	Score	High points	High rebounds	High assists	Location Attendance	Record
54	March 1	@ Boston	L 98–108				Boston Garden	35–19
55	March 3	@ Washington	W 107–85				Capital Centre	36–19
56	March 5	Philadelphia	W 104–99				HemisFair Arena	37–19
57	March 7	New Jersey	W 111–99				HemisFair Arena	38–19
58	March 9	Seattle	W 112–99				HemisFair Arena	39–19
59	March 11	Utah	W 105–96				HemisFair Arena	40–19
60	March 13	@ L.A. Clippers	L 93–97				Los Angeles Memorial Sports Arena	40–20
61	March 14	@ Golden State	W 101–99				Oakland–Alameda County Coliseum Arena	41–20
62	March 16	@ Sacramento	L 85–92				ARCO Arena	41–21
63	March 17	@ L.A. Lakers	L 91–98				Great Western Forum	41–22
64	March 19	Sacramento	W 104–101				HemisFair Arena	42–22
65	March 21	@ Orlando	L 102–105				Orlando Arena	42–23
66	March 22	@ Miami	W 97–90				Miami Arena	43–23
67	March 24	Detroit	W 85–78				HemisFair Arena	44–23
68	March 26	New York	W 129–119 (OT)				HemisFair Arena	45–23
69	March 28	Orlando	W 119–95				HemisFair Arena	46–23
70	March 30	Denver	W 130–116				HemisFair Arena	47–23

April: 8–4 (home: 3–2; road: 5–2)

Game	Date	Team	Score	High points	High rebounds	High assists	Location Attendance	Record
71	April 2	L.A. Lakers	L 115–122				HemisFair Arena	47–24
72	April 4	@ Milwaukee	W 105–101				Bradley Center	48–24
73	April 5	@ Chicago	W 110–107				Chicago Stadium	49–24
74	April 7	@ Minnesota	W 92–87				Target Center	50–24
75	April 8	Golden State	W 115–105				HemisFair Arena	51–24
76	April 10	Portland	L 100–105				HemisFair Arena	51–25
77	April 12	@ Seattle	L 99–100				Seattle Center Coliseum	51–26
78	April 14	@ Phoenix	W 109–101				Arizona Veterans Memorial Coliseum	52–26
79	April 16	L.A. Clippers	W 128–98				HemisFair Arena	53–26
80	April 18	@ Houston	W 102–95				The Summit	54–26
81	April 19	@ Denver	L 122–125				McNichols Sports Arena	54–27
82	April 21	Dallas	W 135–101				HemisFair Arena	55–27

1990–91 schedule

=== Playoffs ===
1991 playoff game log
First Round: 1–3 (home: 1–1; road: 0–2)

Game	Date	Team	Score	High points	High rebounds	High assists	Location Attendance	Series
1	April 25	Golden State	W 130–121	Willie Anderson (38)	David Robinson (13)	Rod Strickland (13)	HemisFair Arena; 15,908	1–0
2	April 27	Golden State	L 98–111	David Robinson (28)	David Robinson (15)	Rod Strickland (7)	HemisFair Arena; 15,908	1–1
3	May 1	@ Golden State	L 106–109	David Robinson (27)	David Robinson (12)	Rod Strickland (7)	Oakland–Alameda County Coliseum Arena; 15,025	1–2
4	May 3	@ Golden State	L 97–110	Sean Elliott (23)	David Robinson (14)	Rod Strickland (8)	Oakland–Alameda County Coliseum Arena; 15,025	1–3

1991 schedule

== Player statistics ==
=== Regular season ===
Player	POS	GP	GS	MP	REB	AST	STL	BLK	PTS	MPG	RPG	APG	SPG	BPG	PPG
Sean Elliott	SF	82	82	3,044	456	238	69	33	1,301	37.1	5.6	2.9	.8	.4	15.9
David Robinson	C	82	81	3,095	1,063	208	127	320	2,101	37.7	13.0	2.5	1.5	3.9	25.6
Willie Anderson	SG	75	75	2,592	351	358	79	46	1,083	34.6	4.7	4.8	1.1	.6	14.4
Paul Pressey	SG	70	18	1,683	176	271	63	32	528	24.0	2.5	3.9	.9	.5	7.5
Terry Cummings	PF	67	62	2,195	521	157	61	30	1,177	32.8	7.8	2.3	.9	.4	17.6
Sidney Green	PF	66	7	1,099	313	52	32	13	443	16.7	4.7	.8	.5	.2	6.7
David Greenwood	PF	63	11	1,018	221	52	29	25	239	16.2	3.5	.8	.5	.4	3.8
Rod Strickland	PG	58	56	2,076	219	463	117	11	800	35.8	3.8	8.0	2.0	.2	13.8
Sean Higgins	SF	50	0	464	63	35	8	1	225	9.3	1.3	.7	.2	.0	4.5
Avery Johnson^{†}	PG	47	10	742	56	153	33	2	241	15.8	1.2	3.3	.7	.0	5.1
Dwayne Schintzius	C	42	7	398	121	17	2	29	158	9.5	2.9	.4	.0	.7	3.8
Tony Massenburg	PF	35	0	161	58	4	4	9	82	4.6	1.7	.1	.1	.3	2.3
David Wingate	SG	25	0	563	75	46	19	5	136	22.5	3.0	1.8	.8	.2	5.4
Reggie Williams^{†}	SF	22	0	354	59	46	20	11	171	16.1	2.7	2.1	.9	.5	7.8
Byron Dinkins^{†}	PG	10	0	144	11	19	2	0	34	14.4	1.1	1.9	.2	.0	3.4
Pete Myers	SG	8	1	103	18	14	3	3	29	12.9	2.3	1.8	.4	.4	3.6
Clifford Lett	PG	7	0	99	7	7	2	1	34	14.1	1.0	1.0	.3	.1	4.9

- ^{†} Denotes player spent time with another team in the season. Stats reflect time with the Spurs only.

=== Playoffs ===
Player	POS	GP	GS	MP	REB	AST	STL	BLK	PTS	MPG	RPG	APG	SPG	BPG	PPG
Rod Strickland	PG	4	4	168	21	35	9	0	75	42.0	5.3	8.8	2.3	.0	18.8
David Robinson	C	4	4	166	54	8	6	15	103	41.5	13.5	2.0	1.5	3.8	25.8
Willie Anderson	SG	4	4	159	19	19	6	2	76	39.8	4.8	4.8	1.5	.5	19.0
Sean Elliott	SF	4	4	132	22	16	4	1	59	33.0	5.5	4.0	1.0	.3	14.8
Terry Cummings	PF	4	4	124	37	4	3	2	59	31.0	9.3	1.0	.8	.5	14.8
Paul Pressey	SG	4	0	124	11	16	8	3	33	31.0	2.8	4.0	2.0	.8	8.3
David Wingate	SG	3	0	38	3	1	1	0	14	12.7	1.0	.3	.3	.0	4.7
Avery Johnson	PG	3	0	19	0	4	1	0	2	6.3	.0	1.3	.3	.0	.7
Sean Higgins	SF	3	0	13	0	1	0	0	0	4.3	.0	.3	.0	.0	.0
Sidney Green	PF	3	0	11	4	0	0	0	8	3.7	1.3	.0	.0	.0	2.7
David Greenwood	PF	1	0	5	2	2	0	0	2	5.0	2.0	2.0	.0	.0	2.0
Tony Massenburg	PF	1	0	1	0	0	0	0	0	1.0	.0	.0	.0	.0	.0

== Awards and records ==
- David Robinson, NBA All-Star
- David Robinson, All-NBA First Team
- David Robinson, NBA All-Defensive First Team

== See also ==
- 1990-91 NBA season
