= 1990–91 Indiana Pacers season =

NBA professional basketball team season

- Head coach: Dick Versace (fired); Bob Hill
- General manager: Donnie Walsh
- Owner: Herbert Simon
- Arena: Market Square Arena

Results
- Record: 41–41 (.500)
- Place: Division: 5th (Central); Conference: 7th (Eastern)
- Playoff finish: First round (lost to Celtics 2–3)
- Stats at Basketball Reference

Local media
- Television: WXIN–TV 59; Prime Sports Midwest (Jerry Baker, Clark Kellogg, Kristi Lee)
- Radio: WNDE–AM 1260 (Mark Boyle, Bobby "Slick" Leonard)

The 1990–91 Indiana Pacers season was the 15th season for the Indiana Pacers in the National Basketball Association, and their 24th season as a franchise.

== Season summary ==
=== Off-season ===
During the off-season, the Pacers signed free agent Michael Williams. For the season, the Pacers redesigned their primary logo, replacing the color blue with dark navy blue to their color scheme of golden yellow and white. The team's primary logo featured a dark navy blue letter "P", with a golden yellow basketball with dark navy blue seams, and with golden yellow lines on the left side of the letter "P", above the team name "Pacers" in dark navy blue; the team removed the white arm, and the state name Indiana from their previous logo.

The team also redesigned their home and road uniforms. The white home uniforms featured a golden yellow, white and dark navy blue trim, and golden yellow and dark navy blue side panels on the right side of their jerseys and shorts, while the road uniforms were changed from blue to dark navy blue, and featured a dark navy blue, white and golden yellow trim, and white and golden yellow side panels; both uniforms featured the team's primary logo on the left leg of their shorts.

The team's new primary logo would remain in use until 2005, while the new uniforms would last until 1997; the basic design of the logo currently remains in use as of 2026.

=== Regular season ===
With the addition of Michael Williams, the Pacers struggled with a 9–16 start to the regular season, as head coach Dick Versace was fired and replaced with assistant coach Bob Hill. Under Hill, the team held a 19–27 record at the All-Star break, posted a six-game winning streak in February, and played above .500 in winning percentage for the remainder of the season. The Pacers finished in fifth place in the Central Division with a 41–41 record, and earned the seventh seed in the Eastern Conference.

Reggie Miller averaged 22.6 points, 4.0 assists and 1.3 steals per game, and led the Pacers with 112 three-point field goals, while Chuck Person averaged 18.4 points and 5.2 rebounds per game, and sixth man Detlef Schrempf provided the team with 16.1 points, 8.0 rebounds and 3.7 assists per game off the bench, and was named the NBA Sixth Man of the Year. In addition, Vern Fleming provided with 12.7 points and 5.3 assists per game, while Michael Williams contributed 11.1 points, 4.8 assists and 2.1 steals per game, and Rik Smits averaged 10.9 points, 4.7 rebounds and 1.5 blocks per game. Meanwhile, LaSalle Thompson averaged 7.6 points and 6.9 rebounds per game, Mike Sanders contributed 5.8 points per game, second-year guard George McCloud contributed 4.6 points per game, and Greg Dreiling provided with 3.5 points and rebounds per game each.

During the NBA All-Star weekend at the Charlotte Coliseum in Charlotte, North Carolina, rookie power forward, and second-round draft pick Kenny Williams participated in the NBA Slam Dunk Contest. Despite stellar seasons, neither Miller or Person were selected for the 1991 NBA All-Star Game. The Pacers finished 25th in the NBA in home-game attendance, with an attendance of 465,650 at the Market Square Arena during the regular season, which was the third-lowest in the league.

=== NBA playoffs ===
In the Eastern Conference First Round of the 1991 NBA playoffs, the Pacers faced off against the 2nd–seeded, and Atlantic Division champion Boston Celtics, who were led by the quartet of All-Star forward, and former Indiana State University star, Larry Bird, Reggie Lewis, All-Star forward and sixth man Kevin McHale, and All-Star center Robert Parish. The Celtics took a 2–1 series lead, but the Pacers managed to win Game 4 at home, 116–113 at the Market Square Arena to even the series. In Game 5 at the Boston Garden, and during the second quarter, Bird fell down on the court and landed hard on the right side of his face, as he had to go to the locker room; despite the injury, Bird returned to the game and finished with 32 points, as the Celtics defeated the Pacers, 124–121. The Pacers lost to the Celtics in a hard-fought five-game series.

== Draft picks ==
Round	Pick	Player	Position	Nationality	College
2	45	Antonio Davis	PF	United States	UTEP
2	46	Kenny Williams	PF	United States	Elizabeth City State

== Roster ==
1990–91 Indiana Pacers roster
Players

Pos.	No.	Player	Height	Weight	DOB	From
G	5	Byron Dinkins	6 ft 1 in (1.85 m)	170 lb (77 kg)	1967–06–15	Charlotte
C	54	Greg Dreiling	7 ft 1 in (2.16 m)	250 lb (113 kg)	1962–11–07	Kansas
G	10	Vern Fleming	6 ft 5 in (1.96 m)	185 lb (84 kg)	1962–02–04	Georgia
G	20	George McCloud	6 ft 6 in (1.98 m)	205 lb (93 kg)	1967–05–27	Florida State
G	31	Reggie Miller	6 ft 7 in (2.01 m)	185 lb (84 kg)	1965–08–24	UCLA
F	45	Chuck Person	6 ft 9 in (2.06 m)	220 lb (100 kg)	1964–06–27	Auburn
G	33	Mike Sanders	6 ft 6 in (1.98 m)	210 lb (95 kg)	1960–05–07	UCLA
F	11	Detlef Schrempf	6 ft 9 in (2.06 m)	214 lb (97 kg)	1963–01–21	Washington
C	24	Rik Smits	7 ft 4 in (2.24 m)	250 lb (113 kg)	1966–08–23	Marist
C	41	LaSalle Thompson	6 ft 10 in (2.08 m)	245 lb (111 kg)	1961–06–23	Texas
F	44	Kenny Williams	6 ft 9 in (2.06 m)	205 lb (93 kg)	1969–06–09	Elizabeth City State
G	4	Micheal Williams	6 ft 2 in (1.88 m)	175 lb (79 kg)	1966–07–23	Baylor
F	14	Randy Wittman	6 ft 7 in (2.01 m)	210 lb (95 kg)	1959–10–28	Indiana

Coaches
Head coach
- Bob Hill
Assistant(s)
- Mel Daniels
- George Irvine
- Billy Knight
- Bob Ociepka

Legend
- (DP) Unsigned draft pick
- (FA) Free agent
- (S) Suspended
- Injured

== Regular season ==
=== Season standings ===
Central Division	W	L	PCT	GB	Home	Road	Div
y-Chicago Bulls	61	21	.744	—	35–6	26–15	25–5
x-Detroit Pistons	50	32	.610	11	32–9	18–23	19–11
x-Milwaukee Bucks	48	34	.585	13	33–8	15–26	16–14
x-Atlanta Hawks	43	39	.524	18	29–12	14–27	11–19
x-Indiana Pacers	41	41	.500	20	29–12	12–29	15–15
Cleveland Cavaliers	33	49	.402	28	23–18	10–31	11–19
Charlotte Hornets	26	56	.317	35	17–24	9–32	8–22

y - clinched division title
x - clinched playoff spot

#	Eastern Conference				
#	Team	W	L	PCT	GB
1	c-Chicago Bulls	61	21	.744	–
2	y-Boston Celtics	56	26	.683	5
3	x-Detroit Pistons	50	32	.610	11
4	x-Milwaukee Bucks	48	34	.585	13
5	x-Philadelphia 76ers	44	38	.537	17
6	x-Atlanta Hawks	43	39	.524	18
7	x-Indiana Pacers	41	41	.500	20
8	x-New York Knicks	39	43	.476	22
9	Cleveland Cavaliers	33	49	.402	28
10	Washington Bullets	30	52	.366	31
11	New Jersey Nets	26	56	.317	35
12	Charlotte Hornets	26	56	.317	35
13	Miami Heat	24	58	.293	37

z - clinched division title
y - clinched division title
x - clinched playoff spot

== Game log ==
=== Regular season ===
1990–91 game log
Total: 41–41 (home: 29–12; road: 12–29)
November: 5–10 (home: 5–2; road: 0–8)

Game	Date	Team	Score	High points	High rebounds	High assists	Location Attendance	Record
1	November 2, 1990	New Jersey	W 100–81				Market Square Arena	1–0
2	November 3, 1990	@ Atlanta	L 120–121				The Omni	1–1
3	November 6, 1990	Minnesota	W 98–96				Market Square Arena	2–1
4	November 9, 1990	Cleveland	W 122–107				Market Square Arena	3–1
5	November 10, 1990	@ Miami	L 105–120				Miami Arena	3–2
6	November 13, 1990	Philadelphia	L 100–108				Market Square Arena	3–3
7	November 14, 1990	@ Cleveland	L 95–113				Richfield Coliseum	3–4
8	November 16, 1990	Miami	W 106–80				Market Square Arena	4–4
9	November 17, 1990	@ Orlando	L 89–96				Orlando Arena	4–5
10	November 21, 1990	Detroit	L 100–108 (OT)				Market Square Arena	4–6
11	November 23, 1990	Houston	W 112–111				Market Square Arena	5–6
12	November 24, 1990	@ Washington	L 105–107 (OT)				Capital Centre	5–7
13	November 27, 1990	@ Milwaukee	L 98–112				Bradley Center	5–8
14	November 28, 1990	@ Philadelphia	L 106–116				The Spectrum	5–9
15	November 30, 1990	@ Chicago	L 95–124				Chicago Stadium	5–10

December: 6–8 (home: 5–2; road: 1–6)

Game	Date	Team	Score	High points	High rebounds	High assists	Location Attendance	Record
16	December 2, 1990	Milwaukee	W 107–103				Market Square Arena	6–10
17	December 4, 1990	@ Minnesota	L 81–83				Target Center	6–11
18	December 5, 1990	Phoenix	W 126–121				Market Square Arena	7–11
19	December 7, 1990	Portland	L 105–127				Market Square Arena	7–12
20	December 8, 1990	Cleveland	W 114–99				Market Square Arena	8–12
21	December 11, 1990	@ Portland	L 96–122				Memorial Coliseum	8–13
22	December 12, 1990	@ Seattle	L 90–99				Seattle Center Coliseum	8–14
23	December 15, 1990	@ Utah	W 124–116				Salt Palace	9–14
24	December 16, 1990	@ L.A. Lakers	L 112–115				Great Western Forum	9–15
25	December 19, 1990	Washington	L 112–114 (OT)				Market Square Arena	9–16
26	December 21, 1990	Charlotte	W 137–114				Market Square Arena	10–16
27	December 22, 1990	@ Chicago	L 118–128				Chicago Stadium	10–17
28	December 26, 1990	@ Boston	L 132–152				Boston Garden	10–18
29	December 29, 1990	New Jersey	W 114–105				Market Square Arena	11–18

January: 7–6 (home: 4–3; road: 3–3)

Game	Date	Team	Score	High points	High rebounds	High assists	Location Attendance	Record
30	January 2, 1991	San Antonio	W 121–109				Market Square Arena	13–17
31	January 4, 1991	@ Atlanta	L 96–111				The Omni	13–18
32	January 5, 1991	@ Houston	L 99–112				The Summit	13–19
33	January 8, 1991	L.A. Clippers	L 107–122				Market Square Arena	13–20
34	January 10, 1991	@ New York	W 129–122				Madison Square Garden	14–20
35	January 12, 1991	Milwaukee	W 118–110				Market Square Arena	15–20
36	January 15, 1991	Atlanta	L 106–117				Market Square Arena	15–21
37	January 16, 1991	@ Milwaukee	L 119–126				Bradley Center	15–22
38	January 19, 1991	Utah	W 117–104				Market Square Arena	15–23
39	January 21, 1991	L.A. Lakers	L 114–120				Market Square Arena	15–24
40	January 23, 1991	@ Philadelphia	W 110–109				The Spectrum	16–24
41	January 25, 1991	@ Washington (at Baltimore, MD)	W 106–100				Baltimore Arena	17–24
42	January 30, 1991	Charlotte	W 123–105				Market Square Arena	18–24

February: 7–6 (home: 4–2; road: 3–4)

Game	Date	Team	Score	High points	High rebounds	High assists	Location Attendance	Record
43	February 1, 1991	@ Miami	L 113–116				Miami Arena	18–25
44	February 2, 1991	Seattle	W 106–100				Market Square Arena	19–25
45	February 5, 1991	@ Dallas	L 109–114				Reunion Arena	19–26
46	February 7, 1991	@ San Antonio	L 108–118				HemisFair Arena	19–27
All-Star Break
47	February 12, 1991	New York	L 110–114				Market Square Arena	19–28
48	February 13, 1991	@ Detroit	W 105–101				The Palace of Auburn Hills	20–28
49	February 17, 1991	Sacramento	W 113–110				Market Square Arena	21–28
50	February 19, 1991	@ Charlotte	W 115–102				Charlotte Coliseum	22–28
51	February 20, 1991	Orlando	W 122–120 (OT)				Market Square Arena	23–28
52	February 22, 1991	@ Cleveland	W 106–98				Richfield Coliseum	24–28
53	February 24, 1991	Boston	W 115–109				Market Square Arena	25–28
54	February 26, 1991	@ New Jersey	L 104–129				Brendan Byrne Arena	25–29
55	February 27, 1991	Dallas	L 104–108				Market Square Arena	25–30

March: 11–6 (home: 8–1; road: 3–5)

Game	Date	Team	Score	High points	High rebounds	High assists	Location Attendance	Record
56	March 1, 1991	Cleveland	W 118–115				Market Square Arena	26–30
57	March 2, 1991	Chicago	W 135–114				Market Square Arena	27–30
58	March 4, 1991	@ Boston (at Hartford, CT)	L 101–126				Hartford Civic Center	27–31
59	March 5, 1991	Charlotte	W 112–101				Market Square Arena	28–31
60	March 7, 1991	Denver	W 145–125				Market Square Arena	29–31
61	March 9, 1991	Detroit	L 112–114				Market Square Arena	29–32
62	March 12, 1991	@ Golden State	L 117–129				Oakland-Alameda County Coliseum Arena	29–33
63	March 14, 1991	@ Sacramento	W 107–103				ARCO Arena	29–34
64	March 15, 1991	@ L.A. Clippers	W 121–109				Los Angeles Memorial Sports Arena	30–34
65	March 17, 1991	@ Denver	W 130–92				McNichols Sports Arena	31–34
66	March 18, 1991	@ Phoenix	L 103–111				Arizona Veterans Memorial Coliseum	32–34
67	March 20, 1991	Miami	W 117–107				Market Square Arena	33–34
68	March 22, 1991	Boston	W 121–109				Market Square Arena	34–34
69	March 23, 1991	@ Chicago	L 119–133				Chicago Stadium	34–35
70	March 26, 1991	Atlanta	W 123–113				Market Square Arena	35–35
71	March 27, 1991	@ Detroit	L 93–102				The Palace of Auburn Hills	35–36
72	March 31, 1991	Golden State	W 127–120 (OT)				Market Square Arena	36–36

April: 5–5 (home: 3–2; road: 2–3)

Game	Date	Team	Score	High points	High rebounds	High assists	Location Attendance	Record
73	April 3, 1991	Philadelphia	L 112–114				Market Square Arena	36–37
74	April 5, 1991	Washington	W 117–103				Market Square Arena	37–37
75	April 6, 1991	@ Atlanta	L 110–137				The Omni	37–38
76	April 9, 1991	@ Charlotte	W 122–120				Charlotte Coliseum	38–38
77	April 10, 1991	Chicago	L 96–101				Market Square Arena	38–39
78	April 12, 1991	@ New York	L 108–112				Madison Square Garden	38–40
79	April 14, 1991	Detroit	W 125–107				Market Square Arena	39–40
80	April 16, 1991	@ New Jersey	W 132–126				Brendan Byrne Arena	40–40
81	April 19, 1991	New York	W 130–118				Market Square Arena	41–40
82	April 20, 1991	@ Milwaukee	L 100–133				Bradley Center	41–41

1990–91 schedule

== Playoffs ==
1991 playoff game log
Eastern Conference First Round: 2–3 (home: 1–1; road: 1–2)

Game	Date	Team	Score	High points	High rebounds	High assists	Location Attendance	Series
1	April 26, 1991	@ Boston	L 120–127	Reggie Miller (24)	Detlef Schrempf (10)	Chuck Person (7)	Boston Garden; 14,890	0–1
2	April 28, 1991	@ Boston	W 130–118	Chuck Person (39)	Dreiling, Schrempf (7)	Micheal Williams (10)	Boston Garden; 14,890	1–1
3	May 1, 1991	Boston	L 105–112	Miller, Schrempf (20)	Detlef Schrempf (10)	Micheal Williams (7)	Market Square Arena; 16,530	1–2
4	May 3, 1991	Boston	W 116–113	Chuck Person (30)	LaSalle Thompson (7)	Micheal Williams (9)	Market Square Arena; 16,530	2–2
5	May 5, 1991	@ Boston	L 121–124	Chuck Person (32)	LaSalle Thompson (9)	Micheal Williams (10)	Boston Garden; 14,890	2–3

1991 schedule

== Player statistics ==
=== Regular season ===
Player	POS	GP	GS	MP	REB	AST	STL	BLK	PTS	MPG	RPG	APG	SPG	BPG	PPG
Reggie Miller	SG	82	82	2,972	281	331	109	13	1,855	36.2	3.4	4.0	1.3	.2	22.6
LaSalle Thompson	C	82	77	1,946	563	147	63	63	625	23.7	6.9	1.8	.8	.8	7.6
Detlef Schrempf	PF	82	3	2,632	660	301	58	22	1,320	32.1	8.0	3.7	.7	.3	16.1
Chuck Person	SF	80	79	2,566	417	238	56	17	1,474	32.1	5.2	3.0	.7	.2	18.4
Mike Sanders	SF	80	7	1,357	185	106	37	26	463	17.0	2.3	1.3	.5	.3	5.8
Rik Smits	C	76	38	1,690	357	84	24	111	828	22.2	4.7	1.1	.3	1.5	10.9
Kenny Williams	PF	75	0	527	131	31	11	31	220	7.0	1.7	.4	.1	.4	2.9
George McCloud	SF	74	0	1,070	118	150	40	11	343	14.5	1.6	2.0	.5	.1	4.6
Greg Dreiling	C	73	42	1,031	255	51	24	29	259	14.1	3.5	.7	.3	.4	3.5
Micheal Williams	PG	73	37	1,706	176	348	150	17	813	23.4	2.4	4.8	2.1	.2	11.1
Vern Fleming	PG	69	45	1,929	214	369	76	13	877	28.0	3.1	5.3	1.1	.2	12.7
Randy Wittman	SF	41	0	355	33	25	10	4	74	8.7	.8	.6	.2	.1	1.8
Jawann Oldham	C	4	0	19	3	0	0	0	6	4.8	.8	.0	.0	.0	1.5
Byron Dinkins^{†}	PG	2	0	5	1	0	0	0	2	2.5	.5	.0	.0	.0	1.0

- ^{†} Denotes player spent time with another team in the season. Stats reflect time with the Pacers only.

=== Playoffs ===
Player	POS	GP	GS	MP	REB	AST	STL	BLK	PTS	MPG	RPG	APG	SPG	BPG	PPG
Reggie Miller	SG	5	5	193	16	14	8	2	108	38.6	3.2	2.8	1.6	.4	21.6
Chuck Person	SF	5	5	192	28	16	5	0	130	38.4	5.6	3.2	1.0	.0	26.0
Micheal Williams	PG	5	5	183	16	42	14	0	103	36.6	3.2	8.4	2.8	.0	20.6
LaSalle Thompson	C	5	5	126	31	8	4	7	45	25.2	6.2	1.6	.8	1.4	9.0
Greg Dreiling	C	5	5	75	18	0	0	0	14	15.0	3.6	.0	.0	.0	2.8
Detlef Schrempf	PF	5	0	179	36	11	2	0	79	35.8	7.2	2.2	.4	.0	15.8
Vern Fleming	PG	5	0	115	17	23	1	3	47	23.0	3.4	4.6	.2	.6	9.4
Rik Smits	C	5	0	88	18	2	1	7	49	17.6	3.6	.4	.2	1.4	9.8
Mike Sanders	SF	5	0	41	4	4	4	2	15	8.2	.8	.8	.8	.4	3.0
Kenny Williams	PF	2	0	2	0	0	0	0	0	1.0	.0	.0	.0	.0	.0
Randy Wittman	SF	1	0	6	0	1	0	0	2	6.0	.0	1.0	.0	.0	2.0

== Awards and records ==
- Detlef Schrempf, NBA Sixth Man of the Year Award

== See also ==
- 1990-91 NBA season
