= 1990–91 Chicago Bulls season =

Bulls' 25th season in the National Basketball Association

- NBA champions
- Conference champions
- Division champions
- Head coach: Phil Jackson
- General manager: Jerry Krause
- Owner: Jerry Reinsdorf
- Arena: Chicago Stadium

Results
- Record: 61–21 (.744)
- Place: Division: 1st (Central); Conference: 1st (Eastern)
- Playoff finish: NBA champions (Defeated Lakers 4–1)
- Stats at Basketball Reference

Local media
- Television: WGN-TV 9 SportsChannel Chicago (Jim Durham, Johnny "Red" Kerr)
- Radio: WLUP–AM 1000 (Jim Durham, Johnny "Red" Kerr, John Rooney, Tom Boerwinkle)

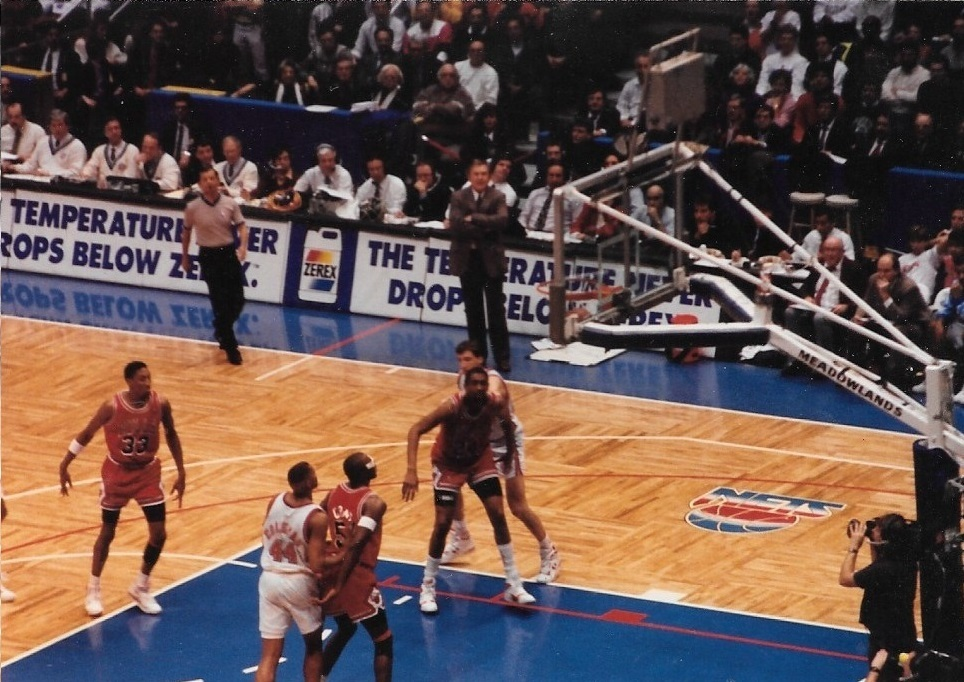
A regular season game between the Bulls, and the New Jersey Nets at the Brendan Byrne Arena on March 28, 1991

.

The 1990–91 Chicago Bulls season was the 25th season for the Chicago Bulls in the National Basketball Association.

== Season summary ==
=== Off-season ===
During the off-season, the Bulls acquired Dennis Hopson from the New Jersey Nets, and signed free agent Cliff Levingston.

=== Regular season ===
The Bulls got off to a slow start losing their first three games, and later on holding a 5–6 start to the regular season. However, the team soon recovered posting a seven-game winning streak between November and December afterwards, and posting another seven-game winning streak in January, as the team held a 32–14 record at the All-Star break. The Bulls posted an 11-game winning streak between February and March, and then posted a nine-game winning streak in March, finishing in first place in the Central Division with a 61–21 record, surpassing their previous franchise-best record from the 1971–72 season, and earning the first seed in the Eastern Conference; the team qualified for the NBA playoffs for the seventh consecutive year. Widely regarded as one of the greatest teams of all time, the Bulls had the best team offensive rating and the seventh best team defensive rating in the NBA.

Michael Jordan won another scoring title averaging 31.5 points, 6.0 rebounds, 5.5 assists and 2.7 steals per game, and won his second NBA Most Valuable Player of the Year award; he was also named to the All-NBA First Team, and to the NBA All-Defensive First Team. In addition, Scottie Pippen averaged 17.8 points, 7.3 rebounds, 6.2 assists and 2.4 steals per game, and was named to the NBA All-Defensive Second Team, while Horace Grant provided the team with 12.8 points and 8.4 rebounds per game, and Bill Cartwright contributed 9.6 points and 6.2 rebounds per game. Meanwhile, second-year guard B.J. Armstrong provided with 8.8 points and 3.7 assists per game off the bench, John Paxson contributed 8.7 points and 3.6 assists per game, second-year forward Stacey King averaged 5.5 points per game, three-point specialist Craig Hodges contributed 5.0 points per game, Will Perdue averaged 4.1 points and 4.5 rebounds per game, and Levingston provided with 4.0 points per game.

During the NBA All-Star weekend at the Charlotte Coliseum in Charlotte, North Carolina, Jordan was selected for the 1991 NBA All-Star Game, as a member of the Eastern Conference All-Star team. Jordan scored 26 points along with 5 assists and 2 steals, despite committing 10 turnovers, as the Eastern Conference defeated the Western Conference, 116–114. Meanwhile, Hodges won the NBA Three-Point Shootout for the second consecutive year. Despite a stellar season, Pippen was not selected for the NBA All-Star Game. Jordan and Pippen both finished tied in seventh place in Defensive Player of the Year voting, while Pippen finished tied in eighth place in Most Improved Player voting, and head coach Phil Jackson finished in fourth place in Coach of the Year voting.

The Bulls finished fourth in the NBA in home-game attendance, with an attendance of 757,745 at the Chicago Stadium during the regular season.

=== NBA playoffs ===
In the Eastern Conference First Round of the 1991 NBA playoffs, the Bulls faced off against the 8th–seeded New York Knicks, a team that featured All-Star center Patrick Ewing, Kiki Vandeweghe, and former Bulls forward Charles Oakley. The Bulls defeated the Knicks in Game 1 at home by a 41-point margin, 126–85 at the Chicago Stadium. After winning Game 2 at home by a score of 89–79, the Bulls won Game 3 over the Knicks on the road, 103–94 at Madison Square Garden to win the series in a three-game sweep.

In the Eastern Conference Semi-finals, and for the second consecutive year, the team faced off against the 5th–seeded Philadelphia 76ers, a team that featured All-Star forward Charles Barkley, All-Star guard Hersey Hawkins, and Armen Gilliam. The Bulls won the first two games over the 76ers at the Chicago Stadium before losing Game 3 on the road, 99–97 at The Spectrum, despite a 46-point performance from Jordan. The Bulls won the next two games, which included a Game 5 win over the 76ers at the Chicago Stadium, 100–95 to win the series in five games.

In the Eastern Conference Finals, and for the fourth consecutive year, the Bulls faced off against the 3rd–seeded, and 2-time defending NBA champion Detroit Pistons, who were led by the All-Star trio of Isiah Thomas, Joe Dumars, and Defensive Player of the Year, Dennis Rodman. The Bulls won the first two games over the Pistons at the Chicago Stadium, and then won the next two games on the road, including a Game 4 win over the Pistons at The Palace of Auburn Hills, 115–94 to win the series in a four-game sweep, and advance to the NBA Finals for the first time in franchise history.

In the 1991 NBA Finals, the Bulls faced off against the 3rd–seeded Los Angeles Lakers, who were led by the trio of All-Star guard Magic Johnson, All-Star forward James Worthy, and Byron Scott. The Bulls lost Game 1 to the Lakers at home, 93–91 at the Chicago Stadium, but managed to win Game 2 at home, 107–86 to even the series. The Bulls won the next three games on the road, including a Game 5 win over the Lakers at the Great Western Forum, 108–101 to win the series in five games, and winning their first ever NBA championship in franchise history; Jordan was named the NBA Finals Most Valuable Player. This season was the first of three consecutive NBA titles for the Bulls, as well as marking the beginning of the legendary Bulls dynasty, which would net the team five more championships over the next seven seasons.

=== Aftermath ===
In 2024, following the Boston Celtics winning their 18th overall championship, the 1990–91 Bulls team would tie that same Celtics team for the 20th easiest route to the NBA Finals championship according to HoopsHype, with the Bulls being docked due to their first round opponent, the New York Knicks, having a losing record that season.

== Draft picks ==
Round	Pick	Player	Position	Nationality	Club team
2	29	Toni Kukoč	SF	Yugoslavia (Croatia)	KK Split

== Roster ==
1990–91 Chicago Bulls roster
Players

Pos.	No.	Player	Height	Weight	DOB	From
G	10	BJ Armstrong	6 ft 2 in (1.88 m)	175 lb (79 kg)	1967–09–09	Iowa
C	24	Bill Cartwright	7 ft 1 in (2.16 m)	245 lb (111 kg)	1957–07–30	San Francisco
F	54	Horace Grant	6 ft 10 in (2.08 m)	245 lb (111 kg)	1965–07–04	Clemson
G	14	Craig Hodges	6 ft 2 in (1.88 m)	190 lb (86 kg)	1960–06–27	Long Beach State
G/F	2	Dennis Hopson	6 ft 5 in (1.96 m)	200 lb (91 kg)	1965–04–22	Ohio State
G	23	Michael Jordan	6 ft 6 in (1.98 m)	215 lb (98 kg)	1963–02–17	North Carolina
F/C	34	Stacey King	6 ft 11 in (2.11 m)	230 lb (104 kg)	1967–01–29	Oklahoma
F	53	Cliff Levingston	6 ft 8 in (2.03 m)	230 lb (104 kg)	1961–01–04	Wichita State
G	5	John Paxson	6 ft 2 in (1.88 m)	185 lb (84 kg)	1960–09–29	Notre Dame
C	32	Will Perdue	7 ft 0 in (2.13 m)	240 lb (109 kg)	1965–08–29	Vanderbilt
F	33	Scottie Pippen	6 ft 7 in (2.01 m)	220 lb (100 kg)	1965–09–25	Central Arkansas
F	42	Scott Williams	6 ft 10 in (2.08 m)	230 lb (104 kg)	1968–03–21	North Carolina

Coaches
Head coach
- Phil Jackson
Assistant(s)
- Johnny Bach
- Jim Cleamons
- Tex Winter

Legend
- (DP) Unsigned draft pick
- (FA) Free agent
- (S) Suspended
- Injured

Roster
Updated: May 20, 2025

== Regular season ==
=== Season standings ===
Central Division	W	L	PCT	GB	Home	Road	Div
y-Chicago Bulls	61	21	.744	—	35–6	26–15	25–5
x-Detroit Pistons	50	32	.610	11	32–9	18–23	19–11
x-Milwaukee Bucks	48	34	.585	13	33–8	15–26	16–14
x-Atlanta Hawks	43	39	.524	18	29–12	14–27	11–19
x-Indiana Pacers	41	41	.500	20	29–12	12–29	15–15
Cleveland Cavaliers	33	49	.402	28	23–18	10–31	11–19
Charlotte Hornets	26	56	.317	35	17–24	9–32	8–22

#	Eastern Conference				
#	Team	W	L	PCT	GB
1	c-Chicago Bulls	61	21	.744	–
2	y-Boston Celtics	56	26	.683	5
3	x-Detroit Pistons	50	32	.610	11
4	x-Milwaukee Bucks	48	34	.585	13
5	x-Philadelphia 76ers	44	38	.537	17
6	x-Atlanta Hawks	43	39	.524	18
7	x-Indiana Pacers	41	41	.500	20
8	x-New York Knicks	39	43	.476	22
9	Cleveland Cavaliers	33	49	.402	28
10	Washington Bullets	30	52	.366	31
11	New Jersey Nets	26	56	.317	35
12	Charlotte Hornets	26	56	.317	35
13	Miami Heat	24	58	.293	37

== Game log ==
=== Regular season ===
1990–91 game log
Total: 61–21 (Home: 35–6; Road: 26–15)
November: 9–6 (home: 3–2; road: 6–4)

Game	Date	Team	Score	High points	High rebounds	High assists	Location Attendance	Record
1	November 2, 1990	Philadelphia	L 116–124	Michael Jordan (34)	Cliff Levingston (6)	Jordan & Paxson (7)	Chicago Stadium; 18,676	0–1
2	November 3, 1990	@ Washington	L 102–103	Michael Jordan (28)	Michael Jordan (10)	B. J. Armstrong (4)	Capital Centre; 18,756	0–2
3	November 6, 1990	Boston	L 108–110	Michael Jordan (33)	Cartwright & Jordan (8)	Michael Jordan (12)	Chicago Stadium; 18,676	0–3
4	November 7, 1990	@ Minnesota	W 96–91	Grant & Jordan (17)	Horace Grant (10)	Michael Jordan (6)	Target Center; 19,006	1–3
5	November 9, 1990	@ Boston	W 120–100	Michael Jordan (41)	Cliff Levingston (12)	Scottie Pippen (10)	Boston Garden; 14,890	2–3
6	November 10, 1990	Charlotte	W 105–86	Michael Jordan (23)	Bill Cartwright (7)	Michael Jordan (8)	Chicago Stadium; 18,676	3–3
7	November 13, 1990	@ Utah	W 84–82	Michael Jordan (29)	Grant & Jordan (11)	Scottie Pippen (6)	Salt Palace; 12,616	4–3
8	November 15, 1990	@ Golden State	L 93–103	Horace Grant (18)	Scottie Pippen (9)	Scottie Pippen (7)	Oakland–Alameda County Coliseum Arena; 15,025	4–4
9	November 17, 1990	@ Seattle	W 116–95	Michael Jordan (33)	Scottie Pippen (10)	Scottie Pippen (6)	Seattle Center Coliseum; 14,692	5–4
10	November 18, 1990	@ Portland	L 112–125	Michael Jordan (29)	Bill Cartwright (8)	Michael Jordan (7)	Memorial Coliseum; 12,884	5–5
11	November 21, 1990	@ Phoenix	L 107–109	Michael Jordan (34)	Bill Cartwright (12)	3 players tied (4)	Arizona Veterans Memorial Coliseum; 14,487	5–6
12	November 23, 1990	@ L.A. Clippers	W 105–97	John Paxson (26)	Scottie Pippen (13)	Scottie Pippen (12)	Los Angeles Memorial Sports Arena; 15,357	6–6
13	November 24, 1990	@ Denver	W 151–145	Michael Jordan (38)	Bill Cartwright (8)	Michael Jordan (12)	McNichols Sports Arena; 17,022	7–6
14	November 28, 1990	Washington	W 118–94	Michael Jordan (24)	Bill Cartwright (8)	Michael Jordan (7)	Chicago Stadium; 18,165	8–6
15	November 30, 1990	Indiana	W 124–95	Michael Jordan (37)	Horace Grant (9)	Scottie Pippen (15)	Chicago Stadium; 18,346	9–6

December: 11–3 (home: 10–1; road: 1–2)

Game	Date	Team	Score	High points	High rebounds	High assists	Location Attendance	Record
16	December 1, 1990	@ Cleveland	W 120–85	Michael Jordan (32)	Bill Cartwright (9)	Scottie Pippen (13)	Richfield Coliseum; 20,273	10–6
17	December 4, 1990	Phoenix	W 155–127	Michael Jordan (27)	Horace Grant (12)	Scottie Pippen (11)	Chicago Stadium; 18,094	11–6
18	December 7, 1990	New York	W 108–98	Michael Jordan (33)	Horace Grant (13)	Michael Jordan (9)	Chicago Stadium; 18,676	12–6
19	December 8, 1990	Portland	L 101–109	Michael Jordan (35)	Scottie Pippen (14)	John Paxson (11)	Chicago Stadium; 18,676	12–7
20	December 11, 1990	@ Milwaukee	L 87–99	Michael Jordan (31)	Horace Grant (9)	Michael Jordan (5)	Bradley Center; 18,633	12–8
21	December 14, 1990	L.A. Clippers	W 128–88	Scottie Pippen (22)	Will Perdue (9)	B. J. Armstrong (9)	Chicago Stadium; 17,893	13–8
22	December 15, 1990	Cleveland	W 116–98	Michael Jordan (24)	Michael Jordan (9)	Hodges & Jordan (6)	Chicago Stadium; 18,228	14–8
23	December 18, 1990	Miami	W 112–103	Michael Jordan (39)	Michael Jordan (9)	3 players tied (6)	Chicago Stadium; 17,877	15–8
24	December 19, 1990	@ Detroit	L 84–105	Michael Jordan (33)	Grant & Pippen (9)	Michael Jordan (6)	The Palace of Auburn Hills; 21,454	15–9
25	December 21, 1990	L.A. Lakers	W 114–103	Michael Jordan (33)	Michael Jordan (15)	Jordan & Pippen (9)	Chicago Stadium; 18,676	16–9
26	December 22, 1990	Indiana	W 128–118	Michael Jordan (29)	Cartwright & Pippen (10)	Scottie Pippen (11)	Chicago Stadium; 18,261	17–9
27	December 25, 1990	Detroit	W 98–86	Michael Jordan (37)	Bill Cartwright (10)	John Paxson (8)	Chicago Stadium; 18,676	18–9
28	December 27, 1990	Golden State	W 128–113	Michael Jordan (42)	Michael Jordan (14)	Scottie Pippen (10)	Chicago Stadium; 18,676	19–9
29	December 29, 1990	Seattle	W 116–91	Michael Jordan (31)	Bill Cartwright (13)	B. J. Armstrong (8)	Chicago Stadium; 18,676	20–9

January: 9–4 (home: 5–0; road: 4–4)

Game	Date	Team	Score	High points	High rebounds	High assists	Location Attendance	Record
30	January 3, 1991	@ Houston	L 92–114	Michael Jordan (32)	Horace Grant (12)	Jordan & Pippen (7)	The Summit; 16,611	20–10
31	January 5, 1991	Cleveland	W 108–92	Michael Jordan (30)	Horace Grant (11)	B. J. Armstrong (8)	Chicago Stadium; 18,676	21–10
32	January 8, 1991	New Jersey	W 111–102	Michael Jordan (41)	Scottie Pippen (12)	Scottie Pippen (7)	Chicago Stadium; 18,169	22–10
33	January 9, 1991	@ Philadelphia	W 107–99	Michael Jordan (40)	Horace Grant (10)	Michael Jordan (9)	The Spectrum; 18,168	23–10
34	January 11, 1991	Atlanta	W 99–96	Michael Jordan (31)	3 players tied (10)	Scottie Pippen (9)	Chicago Stadium; 18,676	24–10
35	January 12, 1991	@ Charlotte	W 106–95	Michael Jordan (33)	Cartwright & Grant (11)	Scottie Pippen (12)	Charlotte Coliseum; 23,901	25–10
36	January 14, 1991	Milwaukee	W 110–97	Michael Jordan (34)	Horace Grant (12)	Michael Jordan (9)	Chicago Stadium; 18,676	26–10
37	January 16, 1991	@ Orlando	W 99–88	Michael Jordan (29)	Horace Grant (13)	Armstrong & Jordan (4)	Orlando Arena; 15,077	27–10
38	January 18, 1991	@ Atlanta	L 105–114	Michael Jordan (30)	Horace Grant (10)	Michael Jordan (8)	The Omni; 16,390	27–11
39	January 21, 1991	@ Miami	W 117–106	Michael Jordan (37)	Horace Grant (10)	4 players tied (5)	Miami Arena; 15,008	28–11
40	January 23, 1991	@ New Jersey	L 95–99	Michael Jordan (35)	Horace Grant (11)	Michael Jordan (5)	Brendan Byrne Arena; 18,333	28–12
41	January 25, 1991	Miami	W 108–87	Michael Jordan (26)	Cliff Levingston (10)	B. J. Armstrong (6)	Chicago Stadium; 18,676	29–12
42	January 31, 1991	@ San Antonio	L 102–106	Michael Jordan (36)	Horace Grant (16)	John Paxson (4)	HemisFair Arena; 15,908	29–13

February: 11–1 (home: 6–0; road: 5–1)

Game	Date	Team	Score	High points	High rebounds	High assists	Location Attendance	Record
43	February 1, 1991	@ Dallas	W 101–90	Michael Jordan (31)	Scottie Pippen (14)	Grant & Jordan (8)	Reunion Arena; 17,007	30–13
44	February 3, 1991	@ L.A. Lakers	L 86–99	Scottie Pippen (24)	Will Perdue (11)	Michael Jordan (9)	Great Western Forum; 17,505	30–14
45	February 4, 1991	@ Sacramento	W 108–97	Michael Jordan (24)	Will Perdue (14)	Scottie Pippen (8)	ARCO Arena; 17,014	31–14
46	February 7, 1991	@ Detroit	W 95–93	Michael Jordan (30)	Michael Jordan (9)	3 players tied (3)	The Palace of Auburn Hills; 21,454	32–14
All-Star Break
47	February 12, 1991	Atlanta	W 122–113	Michael Jordan (32)	Grant & King (6)	Scottie Pippen (10)	Chicago Stadium; 18,545	33–14
48	February 14, 1991	@ New York	W 102–92	Michael Jordan (29)	Stacey King (9)	Scottie Pippen (6)	Madison Square Garden; 19,081	34–14
49	February 16, 1991	New Jersey	W 99–87	Michael Jordan (26)	Jordan & Perdue (11)	Michael Jordan (7)	Chicago Stadium; 18,676	35–14
50	February 18, 1991	@ Cleveland	W 110–95	Michael Jordan (32)	Bill Cartwright (7)	Scottie Pippen (6)	Richfield Coliseum; 20,273	36–14
51	February 19, 1991	Washington	W 118–113	Michael Jordan (40)	Scottie Pippen (13)	Scottie Pippen (8)	Chicago Stadium; 17,894	37–14
52	February 22, 1991	Sacramento	W 129–82	Michael Jordan (34)	Scottie Pippen (10)	Scottie Pippen (9)	Chicago Stadium; 18,413	38–14
53	February 23, 1991	Charlotte	W 129–108	Scottie Pippen (43)	Horace Grant (17)	Paxson & Pippen (6)	Chicago Stadium; 18,676	39–14
54	February 26, 1991	Boston	W 129–99	Michael Jordan (39)	Jordan & Perdue (8)	B. J. Armstrong (8)	Chicago Stadium; 18,676	40–14

March: 13–4 (home: 7–1; road: 6–3)

Game	Date	Team	Score	High points	High rebounds	High assists	Location Attendance	Record
55	March 1, 1991	Dallas	W 109–86	Michael Jordan (29)	Michael Jordan (11)	B. J. Armstrong (10)	Chicago Stadium; 18,676	41–14
56	March 2, 1991	@ Indiana	L 114–135	Michael Jordan (22)	Will Perdue (13)	B. J. Armstrong (5)	Market Square Arena; 16,530	41–15
57	March 5, 1991	Milwaukee	W 104–86	Michael Jordan (30)	Scottie Pippen (10)	B. J. Armstrong (7)	Chicago Stadium; 18,335	42–15
58	March 8, 1991	Utah	W 99–89	Michael Jordan (37)	Bill Cartwright (9)	Scottie Pippen (11)	Chicago Stadium; 18,676	43–15
59	March 10, 1991	@ Atlanta	W 122–87	Michael Jordan (25)	Cliff Levingston (10)	Michael Jordan (9)	The Omni; 16,371	44–15
60	March 12, 1991	Minnesota	W 131–99	Grant & Jordan (20)	Horace Grant (12)	Michael Jordan (10)	Chicago Stadium; 18,268	45–15
61	March 13, 1991	@ Milwaukee	W 102–101	Michael Jordan (39)	Horace Grant (11)	Scottie Pippen (6)	Bradley Center; 18,633	46–15
62	March 15, 1991	@ Charlotte	W 105–92	Michael Jordan (34)	Will Perdue (12)	Michael Jordan (8)	Charlotte Coliseum; 23,901	47–15
63	March 16, 1991	@ Cleveland	W 102–98	Michael Jordan (37)	Horace Grant (9)	Scottie Pippen (7)	Richfield Coliseum; 20,273	48–15
64	March 18, 1991	Denver	W 121–108	Michael Jordan (31)	Scottie Pippen (11)	B. J. Armstrong (9)	Chicago Stadium; 18,163	49–15
65	March 20, 1991	Atlanta	W 129–107	Michael Jordan (22)	Horace Grant (10)	Michael Jordan (11)	Chicago Stadium; 18,439	50–15
66	March 22, 1991	@ Philadelphia	L 90–95	Michael Jordan (20)	Horace Grant (10)	B. J. Armstrong (7)	The Spectrum; 18,168	50–16
67	March 23, 1991	Indiana	W 133–119	Michael Jordan (39)	Will Perdue (11)	Scottie Pippen (8)	Chicago Stadium; 18,676	51–16
68	March 25, 1991	Houston	L 90–100	Michael Jordan (34)	Grant & Pippen (12)	Scottie Pippen (8)	Chicago Stadium; 18,676	51–17
69	March 28, 1991	@ New Jersey	W 128–94	Michael Jordan (42)	Scottie Pippen (14)	Michael Jordan (4)	Brendan Byrne Arena; 20,049	52–17
70	March 29, 1991	@ Washington	W 112–94	Grant & Pippen (22)	Horace Grant (13)	Jordan & Pippen (5)	Capital Centre; 18,756	53–17
71	March 31, 1991	@ Boston	L 132–135 (2OT)	Michael Jordan (37)	Horace Grant (18)	Jordan & Pippen (9)	Boston Garden; 14,890	53–18

April: 8–3 (home: 4–2; road: 4–1)

Game	Date	Team	Score	High points	High rebounds	High assists	Location Attendance	Record
72	April 2, 1991	Orlando	W 106–102	Michael Jordan (44)	Horace Grant (7)	Michael Jordan (6)	Chicago Stadium; 18,264	54–18
73	April 4, 1991	@ New York	W 101–91	Michael Jordan (34)	Scottie Pippen (10)	Scottie Pippen (12)	Madison Square Garden; 19,081	55–18
74	April 5, 1991	San Antonio	L 107–110	Michael Jordan (39)	Horace Grant (10)	Michael Jordan (9)	Chicago Stadium; 18,676	55–19
75	April 7, 1991	Philadelphia	L 111–114 (OT)	Michael Jordan (41)	Horace Grant (7)	Scottie Pippen (9)	Chicago Stadium; 18,676	55–20
76	April 9, 1991	New York	W 108–106	Michael Jordan (28)	Horace Grant (14)	Michael Jordan (8)	Chicago Stadium; 18,676	56–20
77	April 10, 1991	@ Indiana	W 101–96	Michael Jordan (28)	Horace Grant (7)	Scottie Pippen (6)	Market Square Arena; 16,530	57–20
78	April 12, 1991	@ Detroit	L 91–95	Michael Jordan (40)	Scottie Pippen (11)	Scottie Pippen (5)	The Palace of Auburn Hills; 21,454	57–21
79	April 15, 1991	Milwaukee	W 103–94	Michael Jordan (46)	Horace Grant (11)	Scottie Pippen (6)	Chicago Stadium; 18,117	58–21
80	April 17, 1991	@ Miami	W 111–101	Michael Jordan (26)	Scottie Pippen (11)	Scottie Pippen (9)	Miami Arena; 15,008	59–21
81	April 19, 1991	@ Charlotte	W 115–99	Michael Jordan (41)	Horace Grant (11)	Scottie Pippen (8)	Charlotte Coliseum; 23,901	60–21
82	April 21, 1991	Detroit	W 108–100	Scottie Pippen (28)	Will Perdue (10)	Scottie Pippen (5)	Chicago Stadium; 18,678	61–21

1990–91 schedule

=== Playoffs ===
1991 playoff game log
Total: 15–2 (Home: 8–1; Road: 7–1)
First Round: 3–0 (home: 2–0; road: 1–0)

Game	Date	Team	Score	High points	High rebounds	High assists	Location Attendance	Series
1	April 25, 1991	New York	W 126–85	Michael Jordan (28)	Horace Grant (8)	B. J. Armstrong (10)	Chicago Stadium; 18,676	1–0
2	April 28, 1991	New York	W 89–79	Michael Jordan (26)	Scottie Pippen (8)	Scottie Pippen (7)	Chicago Stadium; 18,676	2–0
3	April 30, 1991	@ New York	W 103–94	Michael Jordan (33)	Scottie Pippen (11)	Michael Jordan (7)	Madison Square Garden; 18,021	3–0

Conference Semifinals: 4–1 (home: 3–0; road: 1–1)

Game	Date	Team	Score	High points	High rebounds	High assists	Location Attendance	Series
1	May 4, 1991	Philadelphia	W 105–92	Michael Jordan (29)	Horace Grant (9)	Scottie Pippen (7)	Chicago Stadium; 18,676	1–0
2	May 6, 1991	Philadelphia	W 112–100	Michael Jordan (29)	Scottie Pippen (11)	Michael Jordan (9)	Chicago Stadium; 18,676	2–0
3	May 10, 1991	@ Philadelphia	L 97–99	Michael Jordan (46)	Scottie Pippen (13)	Jordan & Pippen (6)	Spectrum; 18,168	2–1
4	May 12, 1991	@ Philadelphia	W 101–85	Michael Jordan (25)	Horace Grant (11)	Michael Jordan (12)	Spectrum; 17,514	3–1
5	May 14, 1991	Philadelphia	W 100–95	Michael Jordan (38)	Michael Jordan (19)	Michael Jordan (7)	Chicago Stadium; 18,676	4–1

Conference Finals: 4–0 (home: 2–0; road: 2–0)

Game	Date	Team	Score	High points	High rebounds	High assists	Location Attendance	Series
1	May 19, 1991	Detroit	W 94–83	Michael Jordan (22)	Horace Grant (10)	three players tied (6)	Chicago Stadium; 18,676	1–0
2	May 21, 1991	Detroit	W 105–97	Michael Jordan (35)	Scottie Pippen (10)	Michael Jordan (7)	Chicago Stadium; 18,676	2–0
3	May 25, 1991	@ Detroit	W 113–107	Michael Jordan (33)	Scottie Pippen (10)	Michael Jordan (7)	The Palace of Auburn Hills; 21,454	3–0
4	May 27, 1991	@ Detroit	W 115–94	Michael Jordan (29)	Horace Grant (9)	Scottie Pippen (10)	The Palace of Auburn Hills; 21,454	4–0

NBA Finals: 4–1 (home: 1–1; road: 3–0)

Game	Date	Team	Score	High points	High rebounds	High assists	Location Attendance	Series
1	June 2, 1991	L.A. Lakers	L 91–93	Michael Jordan (36)	Horace Grant (10)	Michael Jordan (12)	Chicago Stadium; 18,676	0–1
2	June 5, 1991	L.A. Lakers	W 107–86	Michael Jordan (33)	Jordan & Perdue (7)	Michael Jordan (13)	Chicago Stadium; 18,676	1–1
3	June 7, 1991	@ L.A. Lakers	W 104–96 (OT)	Michael Jordan (29)	Scottie Pippen (13)	Michael Jordan (9)	Great Western Forum; 17,506	2–1
4	June 9, 1991	@ L.A. Lakers	W 97–82	Michael Jordan (28)	Scottie Pippen (9)	Michael Jordan (13)	Great Western Forum; 17,506	3–1
5	June 12, 1991	@ L.A. Lakers	W 108–101	Scottie Pippen (32)	Scottie Pippen (13)	Michael Jordan (10)	Great Western Forum; 17,506	4–1

1991 schedule

== Player stats ==
Legend
GP	Games played	GS	Games started	MPG	Minutes per game
FG%	Field-goal percentage	3P%	3-point field-goal percentage	FT%	Free-throw percentage
RPG	Rebounds per game	APG	Assists per game	SPG	Steals per game
BPG	Blocks per game	PPG	Points per game

=== Regular season ===
Player	GP	GS	MPG	FG%	3P%	FT%	RPG	APG	SPG	BPG	PPG
B. J. Armstrong	82	0	21.1	.481	.500	.874	1.8	3.7	.85	.05	8.8
Bill Cartwright	79	79	28.8	.490	.000	.697	6.2	1.6	.41	.19	9.6
Horace Grant	78	76	33.9	.547	.167	.711	8.4	2.3	1.22	.88	12.8
Craig Hodges	73	0	11.5	.424	.383	.963	.6	1.3	.47	.03	5.0
Dennis Hopson	61	0	11.9	.426	.200	.663	1.8	1.1	.41	.23	4.3
Michael Jordan	82	82	37.0	.539	.312	.851	6.0	5.5	2.72	1.01	31.5
Stacey King	76	6	15.8	.467	.000	.704	2.7	.9	.32	.55	5.5
Cliff Levingston	78	0	13.0	.450	.250	.648	2.9	.7	.37	.55	4.0
John Paxson	82	82	24.0	.548	.438	.829	1.1	3.6	.76	.04	8.7
Will Perdue	74	3	13.1	.494	.000	.670	4.5	.6	.31	.77	4.1
Scottie Pippen	82	82	36.8	.520	.309	.706	7.3	6.2	2.35	1.13	17.8
Scott Williams	51	0	6.6	.510	.500	.714	1.9	.3	.24	.25	2.5

=== Playoffs ===
Player	GP	GS	MPG	FG%	3P%	FT%	RPG	APG	SPG	BPG	PPG
B. J. Armstrong	17		16.1	.500	.600	.800	1.6	2.5	1.12	.06	5.5
Bill Cartwright	17		30.1	.519	.000	.688	4.7	1.9	.53	.41	9.5
Horace Grant	17		39.2	.583	.000	.733	8.1	2.2	.88	.35	13.3
Craig Hodges	17		12.3	.423	.393	.750	.2	.6	.65	.00	4.7
Dennis Hopson	5		3.6	.333	.000	.444	.8	.2	.00	.20	1.6
Michael Jordan	17		40.5	.524	.385	.845	6.4	8.4	2.35	1.35	31.1
Stacey King	11		7.8	.296	.000	.636	2.0	.2	.09	.09	2.1
Cliff Levingston	17		11.3	.512	.000	.500	2.4	.4	.59	.41	2.6
John Paxson	17		28.6	.530	.143	1.000	1.4	3.1	.65	.00	8.2
Will Perdue	17		11.6	.547	.000	.545	3.8	.2	.12	.47	4.1
Scottie Pippen	17		41.4	.504	.235	.792	8.9	5.8	2.47	1.12	21.6
Scott Williams	12		6.0	.462	.000	.550	1.7	.2	.08	.25	1.9

Player statistics citation:

== NBA Finals ==
=== Game 1 ===
Sunday, June 2, at the Chicago Stadium

Team	1	2	3	4	Tot.
Los Angeles	29	22	24	18	93
Chicago	30	23	15	23	91

=== Game 2 ===
Wednesday, June 5, at the Chicago Stadium The Bulls shot a Finals record 61.7% from the floor, with a Jordan layup over Sam Perkins a highlight.

Team	1	2	3	4	Tot.
Los Angeles	23	20	26	17	86
Chicago	28	20	38	21	107

=== Game 3 ===
Friday, June 7, at the Great Western Forum

Team	1	2	3	4	OT	Tot.
Chicago	25	23	18	26	12	104
Los Angeles	25	22	25	20	4	96

Michael Jordan sends Game 3 to overtime with a pull-up jumper with 3.4 seconds to go.

=== Game 4 ===
Sunday, June 9, at the Great Western Forum

Team	1	2	3	4	Tot.
Chicago	27	25	22	23	97
Los Angeles	28	16	14	24	82

=== Game 5 ===
Wednesday, June 12, at the Great Western Forum

The Lakers were facing elimination, and the lack of Worthy and Scott was not any help to the Lakers. This would not stop Magic Johnson as Johnson had 20 assists in the game, but it was not enough. Elden Campbell outscored Michael Jordan with 13 points in the first half, but it was not enough. The Lakers still fought and even led 93–90 in the fourth quarter, but a Bulls 9–0 run, and Paxson's 10 points in the final half of the fourth quarter helped secure the Chicago Bulls', and Michael Jordan's first NBA title.

Team	1	2	3	4	Tot.
Chicago	27	21	32	28	108
Los Angeles	25	24	31	21	101

== Award winners ==
- Michael Jordan, All-NBA First Team
- Michael Jordan, NBA Most Valuable Player Award
- Michael Jordan, NBA Finals Most Valuable Player Award
- Michael Jordan, NBA All-Defensive First Team
- Scottie Pippen, NBA All-Defensive Second Team
- Michael Jordan, Regular season leader, Field Goals (990)
- Michael Jordan, Regular season leader, Field Goal Attempts (1837)
- Michael Jordan, Regular season leader, Total Points (2580)
- Michael Jordan, Regular season leader, Scoring Average (31.5 points per game)
- Michael Jordan, Associated Press Athlete of the Year
- Michael Jordan, Sports Illustrated Sportsperson of the Year

=== NBA All-Star Game ===
- Michael Jordan, Guard
