= 1990–91 Seattle SuperSonics season =

NBA professional basketball team season

- Head coach: K. C. Jones
- General manager: Bob Whitsitt
- Arena: Seattle Center Coliseum

Results
- Record: 41–41 (.500)
- Place: Division: 5th (Pacific); Conference: 8th (Western)
- Playoff finish: West First Round (lost to Trail Blazers 2–3)
- Stats at Basketball Reference

Local media
- Television: KING-TV; KTZZ-TV; Prime Sports Northwest
- Radio: KJR

The 1990–91 Seattle SuperSonics season was the 23rd season for the Seattle SuperSonics in the National Basketball Association.

== Season summary ==
=== Off-season ===
Head coach Bernie Bickerstaff was replaced by his former assistant K. C. Jones, and went on to occupy the desk of vice-president of Basketball Operations for Seattle, resigning months later to accept a job as General Manager of the Denver Nuggets. Despite finishing with a 41–41 record the previous season, the SuperSonics received the second overall pick in the 1990 NBA draft, and selected point guard Gary Payton out of Oregon State University.

=== Regular season ===
Under Jones and with the addition of Payton, the SuperSonics struggled with a 4–10 start to the regular season, after posting a six-game losing streak between November and December. Also in December, the team traded Xavier McDaniel to the Phoenix Suns in exchange for Eddie Johnson. With the addition of Johnson, the SuperSonics posted a six-game winning streak in December, and later on held a 22–23 record at the All-Star break. At mid-season, the team traded Dale Ellis, whose off-the-court problems were the focus of much unwanted attention, to the Milwaukee Bucks in exchange for All-Star guard Ricky Pierce, and also traded Olden Polynice to the Los Angeles Clippers in exchange for Benoit Benjamin. The SuperSonics finished in fifth place in the Pacific Division with a 41–41 record, which was the same record as the previous season, but this time being able to qualify for the NBA playoffs as the eighth seed in the Western Conference.

After the trade, Pierce played a sixth man role off the bench, averaging 17.5 points per game in 32 games, while Johnson averaged 17.4 points per game in 66 games with the team, and Benjamin provided the team with 12.9 points, 8.2 rebounds and 1.7 blocks per game in 31 games. In addition, Derrick McKey averaged 15.3 points and 5.8 rebounds per game, while second-year forward Shawn Kemp showed improvement, averaging 15.0 points, 8.4 rebounds and 1.5 blocks per game, and Sedale Threatt contributed 12.7 points and 1.4 steals per game. Meanwhile, Payton provided with 7.2 points, 6.4 assists and 2.0 steals per game, and was named to the NBA All-Rookie Second Team, Michael Cage averaged 6.4 points and 6.8 rebounds per game, second-year guard Dana Barros contributed 6.3 points per game, and Nate McMillan averaged 4.3 points, 4.8 assists and 1.3 steals per game.

During the NBA All-Star weekend at the Charlotte Coliseum in Charlotte, North Carolina, Kemp participated in the NBA Slam Dunk Contest for the second consecutive year. Pierce finished in fourth place in Sixth Man of the Year voting, while Kemp finished in seventh place in Most Improved Player voting. The SuperSonics finished 23rd in the NBA in home-game attendance, with an attendance of 501,250 at the Seattle Center Coliseum during the regular season, which was the fifth-lowest in the league.

=== NBA playoffs ===
In the Western Conference First Round of the 1991 NBA playoffs, the SuperSonics faced off against the top–seeded, and Pacific Division champion Portland Trail Blazers, who were led by the All-Star trio of Clyde Drexler, Terry Porter and Kevin Duckworth. The SuperSonics lost the first two games to the Trail Blazers on the road at the Memorial Coliseum, but managed to win the next two games at home, which included a Game 4 win over the Trail Blazers, 101–89 at the Seattle Center Coliseum to even the series. However, the SuperSonics lost Game 5 to the Trail Blazers at the Memorial Coliseum, 119–107, thus losing in a hard-fought five-game series.

=== Aftermath ===
Following the season, Threatt was traded to the Los Angeles Lakers.

== Offseason ==
=== Draft picks ===
Of the 3 players Seattle picked in the draft only Gary Payton would stay with the team, since Jud Buechler was traded to the New Jersey Nets and Abdul Shamsid-Deen went to Europe to play for the French team Paris Basket Racing.

Round	Pick	Player	Position	Nationality	College
1	2	Gary Payton	PG	United States	Oregon State
2	38	Jud Buechler	SF/SG	United States	Arizona
2	53	Abdul Shamsid-Deen	C	United States	Providence

=== Pre-season ===
1990 Pre-season game log: 5–3
#	Date	Opponent	Score	Location	Record	Recap
1	October 12	Golden State	L 111–134	Spokane Coliseum	0–1
2	October 15	Golden State	L 97–117	Oakland–Alameda County Coliseum Arena	0–2
3	October 18	Chicago	W 109–103	Florida Suncoast Dome	1–2
4	October 21	Detroit	W 101–82	East Lansing, Michigan	2–2
5	October 23	Chicago	L 90–102	The Kingdome	2–3
6	October 24	Chicago	W 109–87	Pacific Coliseum	3–3
7	October 27	Sacramento	W 98–89	ARCO Arena	4–3
8	October 29	Sacramento	W 117–116	Chico, California	5–3

== Roster ==
1990–91 Seattle SuperSonics roster
Players

Pos.	No.	Player	Height	Weight	DOB	From
G	11	Dana Barros	5 ft 11 in (1.80 m)	163 lb (74 kg)	1967–04–13	Boston College
C	00	Benoit Benjamin	7 ft 0 in (2.13 m)	250 lb (113 kg)	1964–11–22	Creighton
F/C	44	Michael Cage	6 ft 9 in (2.06 m)	224 lb (102 kg)	1962–01–28	San Diego State
C	42	Dave Corzine (injured)	6 ft 11 in (2.11 m)	250 lb (113 kg)	1956–04–25	DePaul
G	20	Quintin Dailey	6 ft 3 in (1.91 m)	180 lb (82 kg)	1961–01–22	San Francisco
F	22	Eddie Johnson	6 ft 7 in (2.01 m)	215 lb (98 kg)	1959–05–01	Illinois
F	40	Shawn Kemp	6 ft 10 in (2.08 m)	230 lb (104 kg)	1969–11–26	Trinity Valley CC
F	31	Derrick McKey	6 ft 9 in (2.06 m)	205 lb (93 kg)	1966–10–10	Alabama
G	10	Nate McMillan	6 ft 5 in (1.96 m)	195 lb (88 kg)	1964–08–03	NC State
F	8	Scott Meents	6 ft 10 in (2.08 m)	225 lb (102 kg)	1964–01–04	Illinois
G	2	Gary Payton	6 ft 4 in (1.93 m)	180 lb (82 kg)	1968–07–23	Oregon State
G	21	Ricky Pierce	6 ft 4 in (1.93 m)	205 lb (93 kg)	1959–08–19	Rice
G	4	Sedale Threatt	6 ft 2 in (1.88 m)	175 lb (79 kg)	1961–09–10	West Virginia Tech

Coaches
Head coach
- K. C. Jones
Assistant(s)
- Bob Kloppenburg
- Kip Motta
- Gary Wortman

Legend
- (DP) Unsigned draft pick
- (FA) Free agent
- (S) Suspended
- Injured

== Regular season ==
=== Season standings ===
Pacific Division	W	L	PCT	GB	Home	Road	Div
y-Portland Trail Blazers	63	19	.768	—	36–5	27–14	18-10
x-Los Angeles Lakers	58	24	.707	5	33–8	25-16	19-9
x-Phoenix Suns	55	27	.671	8	32–9	23-18	17–11
x-Golden State Warriors	44	38	.537	19	30–11	14–27	13–15
x-Seattle SuperSonics	41	41	.500	22	28-13	13–28	12-16
Los Angeles Clippers	31	51	.378	32	23–18	8-33	10-18
Sacramento Kings	25	57	.305	38	24-17	1–40	9–19

y – clinched division title
x – clinched playoff spot

#	Western Conference				
#	Team	W	L	PCT	GB
1	z-Portland Trail Blazers	63	19	.768	–
2	y-San Antonio Spurs	55	27	.671	8
3	x-Los Angeles Lakers	58	24	.707	5
4	x-Phoenix Suns	55	27	.671	8
5	x-Utah Jazz	54	28	.659	9
6	x-Houston Rockets	52	30	.634	11
7	x-Golden State Warriors	44	38	.537	19
8	x-Seattle SuperSonics	41	41	.500	22
9	Orlando Magic	31	51	.378	32
10	Los Angeles Clippers	31	51	.378	32
11	Minnesota Timberwolves	29	53	.354	34
12	Dallas Mavericks	28	54	.341	35
13	Sacramento Kings	25	57	.305	38
14	Denver Nuggets	20	62	.244	43

z – clinched division title
y – clinched division title
x – clinched playoff spot

=== Game log ===
1990–91 game log
Total: 41–41 (home: 28–13; road: 13–28)
November: 4–7 (home: 3–4; road: 1–3)

Game	Date	Team	Score	High points	High rebounds	High assists	Location Attendance	Record
1	November 3	Houston Rockets	W 118–106	X. McDaniel (24)	S. Kemp (10)	X. McDaniel, S. Threatt (7)	Seattle Center Coliseum; 13,922	1–0
2	November 6	Detroit Pistons	W 100–92	X. McDaniel (24)	S. Kemp (13)	G. Payton (6)	Seattle Center Coliseum; 13,078	2–0
3	November 9	@ Denver Nuggets	W 135–129	X. McDaniel (27)	D. McKey (14)	G. Payton (10)	McNichols Sports Arena; 10,571	3–0
4	November 10	Golden State Warriors	L 100–117	X. McDaniel (26)	X. McDaniel, D. McKey (9)	G. Payton (9)	Tacoma Dome; 13,130	3–1
5	November 13	New York Knicks	L 100-116 (OT)	S. Threatt (24)	X. McDaniel (10)	G. Payton (7)	Seattle Center Coliseum; 12,352	3–2
6	November 17	Chicago Bulls	L 95–116	X. McDaniel (17)	M. Cage (7)	G. Payton (5)	Seattle Center Coliseum; 14,692	3–3
7	November 18	@ Los Angeles Clippers	L 65–78	S. Kemp (11)	M. Cage (10)	G. Payton (5)	Los Angeles Memorial Sports Arena; 10,980	3–4
8	November 20	New Jersey Nets	W 105–88	X. McDaniel (35)	S. Kemp (8)	G. Payton (9)	Seattle Center Coliseum; 10,466	4–4
9	November 23	@ Utah Jazz	L 96–97	X. McDaniel (33)	D. McKey (11)	S. Threatt (12)	Salt Palace; 12,616	4–5
10	November 27	San Antonio Spurs	L 111–124	Q. Dailey (29)	M. Cage (8)	G. Payton (8)	Seattle Center Coliseum; 13,293	4–6
11	November 29	@ Phoenix	L 110–128	D. McKey (26)	S. Kemp (11)	G. Payton (6)	Arizona Veterans Memorial Coliseum; 14,487	4–7

December : 8–8 (home: 4–1; road: 4–7)

Game	Date	Team	Score	High points	High rebounds	High assists	Location Attendance	Record
12	December 1	Portland Trail Blazers	L 124-130 (3 OT)	X. McDaniel (41)	M. Cage (15)	G. Payton (8)	Seattle Center Coliseum; 14,674	4–8
13	December 3	@ Boston Celtics	L 102–135	S. Threatt (20)	O. Polynice (9)	D. Barros (6)	Boston Garden; 14,890	4–9
14	December 4	@ New Jersey Nets	L 102–106	S. Threatt (20)	M. Cage (14)	G. Payton (9)	Brendan Byrne Arena; 7,029	4–10
15	December 6	@ Miami Heat	W 105–103	S. Threatt (18)	S. Kemp (8)	S. Threatt (11)	Miami Arena; 15,008	5–10
16	December 7	@ Orlando Magic	L 100–106	D. McKey (24)	M. Cage (9)	G. Payton (7)	Orlando Arena; 15,077	5–11
17	December 9	@ Milwaukee Bucks	L 99–105	S. Kemp (31)	S. Kemp, D. McKey (10)	N. McMillan, G. Payton (6)	Bradley Center; 14,327	5–12
18	December 12	Indiana Pacers	W 99–90	S. Kemp, D. McKey (18)	S. Kemp (11)	N. McMillan (9)	Seattle Center Coliseum; 10,729	6–12
19	December 13	@ Golden State Warriors	L 106–129	D. Barros (24)	O. Polynice (7)	D. Barros, D. Ellis (4)	Oakland–Alameda County Coliseum Arena; 15,025	6–13
20	December 15	Dallas Mavericks	W 106–105	S. Kemp (22)	M. Cage (8)	N. McMillan (10)	Seattle Center Coliseum; 10,009	7–13
21	December 18	Orlando Magic	W 122–105	D. McKey (33)	S. Kemp (11)	N. McMillan (14)	Seattle Center Coliseum; 1,568	8–13
22	December 20	@ Sacramento Kings	W 110–75	D. Ellis (22)	S. Kemp (10)	G. Payton (12)	ARCO Arena; 17,014	9–13
23	December 22	Sacramento Kings	W 121–93	E. Johnson (25)	O. Polynice (11)	N. McMillan (9)	Seattle Center Coliseum; 10,315	10–13
24	December 26	@ Cleveland Cavaliers	W 99–97	S. Kemp (19)	M. Cage (8)	G. Payton (7)	Coliseum at Richfield; 14,839	11–13
25	December 27	@ Washington Bullets	W 125–120	E. Johnson (22)	S. Kemp (12)	G. Payton (11)	Capital Centre; 2,413	12–13
26	December 29	@ Chicago Bulls	L 91–116	D. McKey (22)	S. Kemp (7)	G. Payton (6)	Chicago Stadium; 18,676	12–14
27	December 30	@ Minnesota Timberwolves	L 106–126	D. Ellis (25)	S. Kemp (11)	G. Payton (6)	Target Center; 19,006	12–15

January : 8–7 (home: 7–1; road: 1–6)

Game	Date	Team	Score	High points	High rebounds	High assists	Location Attendance	Record
28	January 3	Philadelphia 76ers	W 127–99	D. McKey (24)	M. Cage (12)	G. Payton (11)	Seattle Center Coliseum; 13,048	13–15
29	January 4	Miami Heat	W 112–86	S. Threatt (30)	M. Cage (13)	G. Payton (12)	Seattle Center Coliseum; 12,074	14–15
30	January 6	@ Portland Trail Blazers	L 111–114	S. Kemp (25)	S. Kemp (9)	G. Payton (7)	Memorial Coliseum; 12,884	14–16
31	January 8	Los Angeles Lakers	W 96–88	D. McKey (29)	O. Polynice (11)	N. McMillan (10)	Seattle Center Coliseum; 14,441	15–16
32	January 10	Golden State Warriors	L 103–113	D. McKey (19)	S. Kemp, O. Polynice (12)	N. McMillan (7)	Seattle Center Coliseum; 10,813	15–17
33	January 12	@ Sacramento Kings	L 85–101	D. McKey (20)	O. Polynice (14)	G. Payton (9)	ARCO Arena; 17,014	15–18
34	January 15	Denver Nuggets	W 146–99	D. Barros, D. Ellis (22)	S. Kemp (12)	N. McMillan (9)	Seattle Center Coliseum; 9,618	16–18
35	January 18	@ Los Angeles Lakers	L 96–105	D. McKey (24)	S. Kemp (8)	G. Payton (11)	Great Western Forum; 17,505	16–19
36	January 19	Washington Bullets	W 111–89	O. Polynice (27)	S. Kemp (13)	N. McMillan (8)	Seattle Center Coliseum; 13,369	17–19
37	January 22	Milwaukee Bucks	W 132–101	E. Johnson (29)	M. Cage (9)	G. Payton (9)	Seattle Center Coliseum; 9,469	18–19
38	January 25	@ Phoenix Suns	L 113–128	E. Johnson (25)	S. Kemp (13)	N. McMillan (7)	Arizona Veterans Memorial Coliseum; 14,487	18–20
39	January 26	Atlanta Hawks	W 103–102	D. McKey (23)	D. McKey (8)	N. McMillan, G. Payton (9)	Seattle Center Coliseum; 12,792	19–20
40	January 28	@ San Antonio Spurs	L 107–119	E. Johnson (21)	D. McKey (14)	G. Payton (11)	HemisFair Arena; 15,908	19–21
41	January 29	@ Dallas Mavericks	L 112–117	D. McKey (24)	O. Polynice (6)	N. McMillan (8)	Reunion Arena; 15,820	19–22
42	January 31	@ Houston Rockets	W 97–94	S. Threatt (18)	S. Kemp (17)	D. McKey, D. McKey (6)	The Summit; 14,659	20–22

February : 6–6 (home: 3–2; road: 3–4)

Game	Date	Team	Score	High points	High rebounds	High assists	Location Attendance	Record
43	February 2	@ Indiana Pacers	L 100–106	G. Payton (19)	D. McKey (7)	G. Payton (5)	Market Square Arena; 13,064	20–23
44	February 4	@ Charlotte Hornets	W 100–93	E. Johnson (34)	M. Cage (18)	G. Payton (9)	Charlotte Coliseum; 23,901	21–23
45	February 6	Los Angeles Clippers	W 107–104	E. Johnson (27)	S. Kemp (7)	G. Payton (9)	Seattle Center Coliseum; 12,021	22–23
46	February 12	Boston Celtics	L 111–114	E. Johnson (29)	M. Cage (10)	G. Payton (13)	Seattle Center Coliseum; 14,594	22–24
47	February 14	@ Orlando Magic	W 102–90	D. McKey (21)	D. McKey, O. Polynice (9)	N. McMillan (7)	Orlando Arena; 15,077	23–24
48	February 16	@ Atlanta Hawks	L 113–122	D. McKey (30)	O. Polynice (9)	S. Threatt (9)	Omni Coliseum; 15,924	23–25
49	February 18	@ Detroit Pistons	L 83–85	E. Johnson (20)	S. Kemp (13)	N. McMillan (7)	The Palace of Auburn Hills; 21,454	23–26
50	February 19	@ Philadelphia 76ers	L 104-107 (OT)	R. Pierce (18)	S. Kemp (12)	G. Payton (7)	The Spectrum; 15,248	23–27
51	February 21	@ New York Knicks	W 120–101	R. Pierce (26)	S. Kemp (13)	N. McMillan, G. Payton, S. Threatt (5)	Madison Square Garden; 12,515	24–27
52	February 23	Phoenix Suns	L 110–120	S. Kemp (25)	S. Kemp (11)	G. Payton (11)	Seattle Center Coliseum; 14,692	24–28
53	February 24	Utah Jazz	W 103–91	S. Threatt (30)	M. Cage (14)	G. Payton (16)	Seattle Center Coliseum; 12,080	25–28
54	February 26	Los Angeles Clippers	W 93–81	S. Threatt (31)	S. Kemp (15)	N. McMillan (9)	Seattle Center Coliseum; 11,305	26–28

March : 8–9 (home: 5–4; road: 3–5)

Game	Date	Team	Score	High points	High rebounds	High assists	Location Attendance	Record
55	March 1	Charlotte Hornets	W 122–105	R. Pierce (25)	B. Benjamin (13)	N. McMillan (9)	Seattle Center Coliseum; 13,320	27–28
56	March 2	Sacramento Kings	W 120–106	E. Johnson (31)	B. Benjamin (16)	N. McMillan, G. Payton (8)	Seattle Center Coliseum; 12,182	28-28
57	March 4	@ Golden State Warriors	W 105–99	S. Threatt (24)	B. Benjamin (11)	G. Payton (10)	Oakland–Alameda County Coliseum Arena; 15,025	29–28
58	March 5	Cleveland Cavaliers	L 111-113 (OT)	E. Johnson (28)	B. Benjamin, S. Kemp (13)	N. McMillan, G. Payton (7)	Seattle Center Coliseum; 10,623	29-29
59	March 7	@ Minnesota Timberwolves	W 91–86	R. Pierce (25)	N. McMillan (11)	N. McMillan (8)	Target Center; 19,006	30–29
60	March 9	@ San Antonio Spurs	L 99–112	E. Johnson (19)	E. Johnson (7)	D. Barros (5)	HemisFair Arena; 15,908	30-30
61	March 12	@ Houston Rockets	L 91–93	S. Kemp (23)	S. Kemp (16)	D. McKey (6)	The Summit; 15,508	30–31
62	March 13	@ Dallas Mavericks	L 96–98	S. Kemp (24)	S. Kemp (13)	S. Threatt (9)	Reunion Arena; 15,813	30–32
63	March 15	Minnesota Timberwolves	L 96-100 (OT)	D. McKey (20)	B. Benjamin (10)	G. Payton (4)	Seattle Center Coliseum; 11,497	30–33
64	March 16	Utah Jazz	L 98-104 (OT)	E. Johnson (19)	D. McKey (9)	G. Payton (5)	Seattle Center Coliseum; 15,535	30–34
65	March 20	Los Angeles Lakers	W 114–106	B. Benjamin (28)	D. McKey (10)	G. Payton (12)	Seattle Center Coliseum; 14,392	31–34
66	March 22	@ Phoenix Suns	W 111–105	E. Johnson (34)	B. Benjamin (14)	N. McMillan, G. Payton (8)	Arizona Veterans Memorial Coliseum; 14,487	32–34
67	March 24	@ Los Angeles Lakers	L 96–113	S. Kemp (21)	B. Benjamin, M. Cage (7)	S. Threatt (7)	Great Western Forum; 17,505	32–35
68	March 26	@ Portland Trail Blazers	L 113–126	R. Pierce (21)	M. Cage (8)	R. Pierce, S. Threatt (4)	Memorial Coliseum; 12,884	32–36
69	March 27	Portland Trail Blazers	L 107–112	R. Pierce (24)	S. Kemp (10)	G. Payton (6)	Tacoma Dome; 18,167	32–37
70	March 29	Minnesota Timberwolves	W 117–107	E. Johnson, R. Pierce (24)	N. McMillan (7)	G. Payton (7)	Seattle Center Coliseum; 12,968	33–37
71	March 30	Dallas Mavericks	W 115–102	S. Kemp (23)	B. Benjamin (7)	S. Kemp, S. Threatt (4)	Seattle Center Coliseum; 11,756	34–37

April : 7–4 (home: 6–1; road: 1–3)

Game	Date	Team	Score	High points	High rebounds	High assists	Location Attendance	Record
72	April 3	Sacramento Kings	W 106–91	E. Johnson, S. Kemp (20)	S. Kemp (14)	N. McMillan, S. Threatt (6)	Seattle Center Coliseum; 11,987	35–37
73	April 5	@ Los Angeles Clippers	L 90–109	E. Johnson (19)	S. Kemp (12)	N. McMillan (4)	Los Angeles Memorial Sports Arena; 12,932	35–38
74	April 7	W 124–117	@ Denver Nuggets	E. Johnson (31)	S. Kemp (10)	D. McKey (4)	McNichols Sports Arena; 13,779	36–38
75	April 8	Denver Nuggets	W 118–112	B. Benjamin, E. Johnson, R. Pierce (19)	B. Benjamin, S. Kemp (10)	N. McMillan, G. Payton (8)	Seattle Center Coliseum; 12,811	37–38
76	April 10	Los Angeles Clippers	W 140–108	B. Benjamin (22)	B. Benjamin (11)	S. Threatt (9)	Tacoma Dome; 5,714	38–38
77	April 12	San Antonio Spurs	W 100–99	R. Pierce (21)	B. Benjamin, S. Kemp (8)	G. Payton (7)	Seattle Center Coliseum; 13,340	39–38
78	April 13	Orlando Magic	W 105–96	S. Kemp (21)	S. Kemp (7)	D. Barros (7)	Seattle Center Coliseum; 13,073	40–38
79	April 15	Houston Rockets	L 93–97	E. Johnson (22)	M. Cage (8)	S. Threatt (7)	Seattle Center Coliseum; 13,760	40–39
80	April 18	@ Utah Jazz	L 103–130	E. Johnson (17)	B. Benjamin (8)	S. Threatt (6)	Salt Palace; 12,616	40–40
81	April 19	Phoenix Suns	W 104–93	R. Pierce (23)	B. Benjamin (10)	N. McMillan (7)	Seattle Center Coliseum; 12,591	41–40
82	April 21	@ Los Angeles Lakers	L 100–103	E. Johnson (18)	B. Benjamin (12)	N. McMillan (8)	Great Western Forum; 17,505	41-41

1990–91 season schedule

== Playoffs ==
1991 playoff game log
First round: 2–3 (home: 2–0; road: 0–3)

Game	Date	Team	Score	High points	High rebounds	High assists	Location Attendance	Series
1	April 26	@ Portland	L 102–110	Eddie Johnson (33)	Benoit Benjamin (9)	Gary Payton (8)	Memorial Coliseum; 12,884	0–1
2	April 28	@ Portland	L 106–115	Eddie Johnson (28)	Cage, Kemp (11)	McMillan, Payton (6)	Memorial Coliseum; 12,884	0–2
3	April 30	Portland	W 102–99	Sedale Threatt (29)	Shawn Kemp (9)	Nate McMillan (6)	Seattle Center Coliseum; 14,476	1–2
4	May 2	Portland	W 101–89	Eddie Johnson (34)	Benjamin, McKey (9)	Gary Payton (7)	Seattle Center Coliseum; 13,367	2–2
5	May 4	@ Portland	L 107–119	Johnson, Kemp (17)	Benoit Benjamin (6)	Gary Payton (7)	Memorial Coliseum; 12,884	2–3

1991 schedule

== Player statistics ==
Legend
GP	Games played	GS	Games started	MPG	Minutes per game
FG%	Field-goal percentage	3P%	3-point field-goal percentage	FT%	Free-throw percentage
RPG	Rebounds per game	APG	Assists per game	SPG	Steals per game
BPG	Blocks per game	PPG	Points per game

=== Season ===
Player	GP	GS	MPG	FG%	3P%	FT%	RPG	APG	SPG	BPG	PPG
Dana Barros	66	0	11.4	.495	.395	.918	1.1	1.7	0.3	0.0	6.3
Benoit Benjamin*	31	27	29.0	.502	.000	.690	8.2	1.5	0.9	1.7	12.9
Michael Cage	82	55	26.1	.508	.000	.625	6.8	1.1	1.0	0.7	6.4
Dave Corzine	28	0	5.3	.447	.000	.591	1.2	0.1	0.2	0.2	1.7
Quintin Dailey	30	0	10.0	.471	.000	.613	1.1	0.5	0.2	0.0	6.1
Dale Ellis*	30	24	26.7	.463	.303	.738	3.1	2.1	1.1	0.1	15.0
Eddie Johnson*	66	27	26.9	.486	.333	.912	3.4	1.4	0.7	0.1	17.4
Shawn Kemp	81	66	30.1	.508	.167	.661	8.4	1.8	1.0	1.5	15.0
Xavier McDaniel*	15	15	35.3	.479	.000	.710	5.4	2.5	1.7	0.3	21.8
Derrick McKey	73	55	34.3	.517	.211	.845	5.8	2.3	1.2	0.8	15.3
Nate McMillan	78	0	18.4	.433	.354	.613	3.2	4.8	1.3	0.3	4.3
Scott Meents	13	0	4.1	.250	1.000	.500	0.8	0.6	0.5	0.3	1.3
Gary Payton	82	82	27.4	.450	.077	.711	3.0	6.4	2.0	0.2	7.2
Ricky Pierce*	32	2	26.3	.463	.391	.925	2.3	2.3	0.7	0.1	17.5
Olden Polynice*	48	0	20.0	.545	.000	.588	5.6	0.3	0.5	0.4	8.3
Sedale Threatt	80	57	25.8	.519	.286	.792	1.2	3.4	1.4	0.1	12.7

*Statistics with the Seattle SuperSonics.

=== Playoffs ===
Player	GP	GS	MPG	FG%	3P%	FT%	RPG	APG	SPG	BPG	PPG
Dana Barros	3	0	8.3	.692	.400	.750	1.3	1.7	1.0	0.0	7.7
Benoit Benjamin	5	5	32.6	.488	.000	.906	6.6	0.2	0.6	0.2	13.8
Michael Cage	5	0	16.0	.429	.000	.765	16.0	4.2	0.6	0.4	5.0
Dave Corzine	2	0	6.0	.667	.000	1.000	0.5	0.0	0.0	0.0	2.5
Eddie Johnson	5	5	34.2	.517	.267	.828	4.2	1.4	1.4	0.2	24.0
Shawn Kemp	5	5	29.8	.386	.000	.815	7.2	1.2	0.6	0.8	13.2
Derrick McKey	4	0	28.5	.571	.000	.545	5.8	2.0	0.6	0.0	9.5
Nate McMillan	5	0	19.0	.261	.000	.500	3.6	4.4	1.2	0.2	2.8
Scott Meents	2	0	4.0	.500	.000	.000	0.5	0.0	0.5	0.0	2.0
Gary Payton	5	5	27.0	.407	.000	1.000	2.6	6.4	1.6	0.2	4.8
Ricky Pierce	5	0	22.4	.333	.300	.941	2.8	0.8	0.8	0.2	11.4
Sedale Threatt	5	5	27.2	.536	.364	.900	1.6	3.4	1.0	0.0	14.6

Player statistics citation:

== Awards and records ==
=== Awards ===
- Gary Payton was named to the NBA All-Rookie Second Team.

=== Records ===
- Ricky Pierce finished the season with a franchise record .925 in free throw percentage.

== Transactions ==
=== Overview ===
Players Added

Via draft

- Gary Payton

Via free agency

- Dave Corzine

Via trade

- Benoit Benjamin
- Eddie Johnson
- Ricky Pierce
Players Lost

Via free agency

- Steve Johnson

Via trade

- Dale Ellis
- Avery Johnson
- Xavier McDaniel
- Olden Polynice

=== Trades ===
June 27, 1990	To Seattle SuperSonics Nets' agreement not to draft Dennis Scott or Gary Payton with their No. 1 pick. Conditional 2nd round picks for 1993 and 1995	To New Jersey Nets Jud Buechler To Orlando Magic Sonics' agreement not to draft Dennis Scott with their No. 2 pick.
October 24, 1990	To Seattle SuperSonics Conditional 1997 second round pick	To Denver Nuggets Avery Johnson
December 7, 1990	To Seattle SuperSonics Eddie Johnson Conditional 1991 and 1994 first-round picks	To Phoenix Suns Xavier McDaniel
February 15, 1991	To Seattle SuperSonics Ricky Pierce	To Milwaukee Bucks Dale Ellis
February 20, 1991	To Seattle SuperSonics Benoit Benjamin	To Los Angeles Clippers Olden Polynice Conditional 1991 and 1994 first-round picks

=== Free agents ===
==== Additions ====
Player	Signed	Former team
Dave Corzine	October 4	Orlando Magic

==== Subtractions ====
Player	Left	New team
Jim Farmer	October 4	Denver Nuggets
Steve Johnson	October 25	Golden State Warriors

Player Transactions Citation:

== See also ==
- 1990–91 NBA season
