= 1990–91 Philadelphia 76ers season =

NBA professional basketball team season

- Head coach: Jim Lynam
- General manager: Gene Shue
- Arena: The Spectrum

Results
- Record: 44–38 (.537)
- Place: Division: 2nd (Atlantic); Conference: 5th (Eastern)
- Playoff finish: Conference semifinals (lost to Bulls 1–4)
- Stats at Basketball Reference

Local media
- Television: WPHL-TV; SportsChannel Philadelphia; PRISM
- Radio: WIP

The 1990–91 Philadelphia 76ers season was the 42nd season for the Philadelphia 76ers in the National Basketball Association, and their 28th season in Philadelphia, Pennsylvania.

== Season summary ==
=== Off-season ===
During the off-season, the 76ers acquired 7' 7" center Manute Bol from the Golden State Warriors, and signed free agent Rickey Green.

=== Regular season ===
After only just four games into the regular season, Johnny Dawkins sustained a torn ACL in his right knee, and was replaced with Green as the team's starting point guard for the remainder of the season. In November, the 76ers signed free agent Andre Turner as a backup point guard for Green. With the addition of Bol, and despite the loss of Dawkins, the 76ers got off to a 19–8 start to the season, but then lost 10 of their next 16 games. At mid-season, the team traded Mike Gminski to the Charlotte Hornets in exchange for Armen Gilliam. The 76ers held a 25–21 record at the All-Star break, posted a seven-game winning streak between February and March, and finished in second place in the Atlantic Division with a 44–38 record, earning the fifth seed in the Eastern Conference.

Charles Barkley averaged 27.6 points, 10.1 rebounds, 4.2 assists and 1.6 steals per game, and was named to the All-NBA First Team, while Hersey Hawkins averaged 22.1 points, 3.7 assists and 2.2 steals per game, and led the 76ers with 108 three-point field goals, and Gilliam provided the team with 15.0 points and 7.3 rebounds per game in 50 games after the trade. In addition, sixth man Ron Anderson provided with 14.6 points per game off the bench, while Dawkins contributed 15.8 points and 7.0 assists per game during his short four-game stint, and Green contributed 10.0 points and 5.2 assists per game. Meanwhile, Rick Mahorn averaged 8.9 points and 7.8 rebounds per game, Turner contributed 5.9 points and 4.4 assists per game, and Bol provided with 1.9 points, 4.3 rebounds, and 3.0 blocks per game.

During the NBA All-Star weekend at the Charlotte Coliseum in Charlotte, North Carolina, Barkley and Hawkins were both selected for the 1991 NBA All-Star Game, as members of the Eastern Conference All-Star team; it was Hawkins' first and only All-Star appearance. Barkley scored 17 points along with 22 rebounds, and was named the NBA All-Star Game Most Valuable Player, as the Eastern Conference defeated the Western Conference, 116–114. In addition, Hawkins also participated in the NBA Three-Point Shootout. Barkley also finished in fourth place in Most Valuable Player voting.

The 76ers finished eleventh in the NBA in home-game attendance, with an attendance of 624,582 at The Spectrum during the regular season.

=== NBA playoffs ===
In the Eastern Conference First Round of the 1991 NBA playoffs, the 76ers faced off against the 4th–seeded Milwaukee Bucks, who were led by All-Star guard Alvin Robertson, Jay Humphries and Frank Brickowski. The 76ers won the first two games over the Bucks on the road at the Bradley Center, before winning Game 3 at home, 121–100 at The Spectrum to win the series in a three-game sweep.

In the Eastern Conference Semi-finals, and for the second consecutive year, the team faced off against the top–seeded, and Central Division champion Chicago Bulls, who were led by the trio of All-Star guard, and Most Valuable Player of the Year, Michael Jordan, All-Star forward Scottie Pippen, and Horace Grant. The Bulls took a 2–0 series lead, but the 76ers managed to win Game 3 at The Spectrum, 99–97. However, the 76ers lost the next two games, including a Game 5 loss to the Bulls on the road, 100–95 at the Chicago Stadium, thus losing the series in five games.

The Bulls would advance to the NBA Finals for the first time in franchise history, and defeat the Los Angeles Lakers in five games in the 1991 NBA Finals, winning their first ever NBA championship. This season would also be the final NBA playoff appearance for the 76ers until the 1998–99 season; the seven consecutive seasons that followed, in which they would not make the playoffs, were more than the franchise had missed in total since their inaugural season of 1950, five (missed playoffs in 1972–1975, and in 1988).

=== Aftermath ===
Following the season, Mahorn left to play overseas in Italy, while Green signed as a free agent with the Boston Celtics, and Turner signed with the Washington Bullets.

== Draft picks ==
Round	Pick	Player	Position	Nationality	College
2	32	Brian Oliver	SG	United States	Georgia Tech
2	47	Derek Strong	PF	United States	Xavier

== Roster ==
1990–91 Philadelphia 76ers roster
Players

Pos.	No.	Player	Height	Weight	DOB	From
F	20	Ron Anderson	6 ft 7 in (2.01 m)	215 lb (98 kg)	1958–10–15	Fresno State
F	34	Charles Barkley	6 ft 6 in (1.98 m)	252 lb (114 kg)	1963–02–20	Auburn
C	11	Manute Bol	7 ft 7 in (2.31 m)	200 lb (91 kg)	1962–10–16	Bridgeport
G	12	Johnny Dawkins (injured)	6 ft 2 in (1.88 m)	165 lb (75 kg)	1963–09–28	Duke
F	35	Armen Gilliam	6 ft 9 in (2.06 m)	230 lb (104 kg)	1964–05–28	UNLV
G	9	Rickey Green	6 ft 0 in (1.83 m)	170 lb (77 kg)	1954–08–18	Michigan
G	33	Hersey Hawkins	6 ft 3 in (1.91 m)	190 lb (86 kg)	1966–09–29	Bradley
C	40	Dave Hoppen	6 ft 11 in (2.11 m)	235 lb (107 kg)	1964–03–13	Nebraska
C	44	Rick Mahorn	6 ft 10 in (2.08 m)	240 lb (109 kg)	1958–09–21	Hampton
G	31	Brian Oliver	6 ft 4 in (1.93 m)	210 lb (95 kg)	1968–06–01	Georgia Tech
F	21	Kenny Payne	6 ft 8 in (2.03 m)	195 lb (88 kg)	1966–11–25	Louisville
F	50	Robert Reid	6 ft 8 in (2.03 m)	205 lb (93 kg)	1955–08–30	Saint Mary's
G	4	Andre Turner	5 ft 11 in (1.80 m)	160 lb (73 kg)	1964–12–13	Memphis
F	55	Jayson Williams	6 ft 9 in (2.06 m)	240 lb (109 kg)	1968–02–22	St. John's

Coaches
Head coach
- Jim Lynam
Assistant(s)
- Buzz Braman
- Fred Carter

Legend
- (DP) Unsigned draft pick
- (FA) Free agent
- (S) Suspended
- Injured

== Regular season ==
=== Season standings ===
Atlantic Division	W	L	PCT	GB	Home	Road	Div
y-Boston Celtics	56	26	.683	—	35–6	21–20	20-6
x-Philadelphia 76ers	44	38	.537	12	29-12	15-26	14-12
x-New York Knicks	39	43	.476	17	21-20	18-23	17–9
Washington Bullets	30	52	.366	26	21-20	9-32	10-16
New Jersey Nets	26	56	.317	30	20-21	6–35	8-18
Miami Heat	24	58	.293	32	18-23	6-35	9-17

y - clinched division title
x - clinched playoff spot

#	Eastern Conference				
#	Team	W	L	PCT	GB
1	c-Chicago Bulls	61	21	.744	–
2	y-Boston Celtics	56	26	.683	5
3	x-Detroit Pistons	50	32	.610	11
4	x-Milwaukee Bucks	48	34	.585	13
5	x-Philadelphia 76ers	44	38	.537	17
6	x-Atlanta Hawks	43	39	.524	18
7	x-Indiana Pacers	41	41	.500	20
8	x-New York Knicks	39	43	.476	22
9	Cleveland Cavaliers	33	49	.402	28
10	Washington Bullets	30	52	.366	31
11	New Jersey Nets	26	56	.317	35
12	Charlotte Hornets	26	56	.317	35
13	Miami Heat	24	58	.293	37

z - clinched division title
y - clinched division title
x - clinched playoff spot

== Playoffs ==
1991 playoff game log
First Round: 3–0 (home: 1–0; road: 2–0)

Game	Date	Team	Score	High points	High rebounds	High assists	Location Attendance	Series
1	April 25	@ Milwaukee	W 99–90	Hersey Hawkins (25)	Barkley, Mahorn (8)	Charles Barkley (5)	Bradley Center; 13,587	1–0
2	April 27	@ Milwaukee	W 116–112 (OT)	Ron Anderson (24)	Charles Barkley (13)	Charles Barkley (10)	Bradley Center; 15,623	2–0
3	April 30	Milwaukee	W 121–100	Charles Barkley (30)	Charles Barkley (12)	Hawkins, Barkley (6)	Spectrum; 16,239	3–0

Conference semifinals: 1–4 (home: 1–1; road: 0–3)

Game	Date	Team	Score	High points	High rebounds	High assists	Location Attendance	Series
1	May 4	@ Chicago	L 92–105	Charles Barkley (34)	Charles Barkley (11)	Hawkins, Anderson (3)	Chicago Stadium; 18,676	0–1
2	May 6	@ Chicago	L 100–112	Hersey Hawkins (30)	Charles Barkley (9)	Hersey Hawkins (7)	Chicago Stadium; 18,676	0–2
3	May 10	Chicago	W 99–97	Hersey Hawkins (29)	Armen Gilliam (11)	Barkley, Turner (7)	Spectrum; 18,168	1–2
4	May 12	Chicago	L 85–101	Charles Barkley (25)	Charles Barkley (14)	Charles Barkley (6)	Spectrum; 17,514	1–3
5	May 14	@ Chicago	L 95–100	Charles Barkley (30)	Charles Barkley (8)	Charles Barkley (7)	Chicago Stadium; 18,676	1–4

1991 schedule

== Player statistics ==
Legend
GP	Games played	GS	Games started	MPG	Minutes per game
FG%	Field-goal percentage	3P%	3-point field-goal percentage	FT%	Free-throw percentage
RPG	Rebounds per game	APG	Assists per game	SPG	Steals per game
BPG	Blocks per game	PPG	Points per game

=== Regular season ===
Player	GP	GS	MPG	FG%	3P%	FT%	RPG	APG	SPG	BPG	PPG
Ron Anderson	82	13	28.5	.485	.209	.833	4.5	1.4	.8	.2	14.6
Charles Barkley	67	67	37.3	.570	.284	.722	10.1	4.2	1.6	.5	27.6
Manute Bol	82	6	18.6	.396	.071	.585	4.3	.2	.2	3.0	1.9
Johnny Dawkins	4	4	31.0	.634	.250	.909	4.0	7.0	.8	.0	15.8
Mario Elie^{†}	3	0	6.7	.286	.500	.500	.3	.3	.0	.0	2.0
Jim Farmer^{†}	2	0	6.5	.286	.000	1.000	2.5	.0	.0	.0	3.0
Armen Gilliam^{†}	50	50	33.9	.470	.000	.816	7.3	1.6	.7	.6	15.0
Mike Gminski^{†}	30	29	26.4	.384	.125	.841	6.7	1.1	.5	1.1	9.1
Rickey Green	79	75	28.5	.463	.222	.830	1.7	5.2	.7	.1	10.0
Tony Harris	6	0	6.8	.250	.000	.500	.2	.0	.2	.0	1.7
Hersey Hawkins	80	80	38.9	.472	.400	.871	3.9	3.7	2.2	.5	22.1
Dave Hoppen^{†}	11	0	3.9	.500	.000	.667	.8	.0	.1	.0	1.8
Rick Mahorn	80	74	30.5	.467	.000	.788	7.8	1.5	1.0	.7	8.9
Brian Oliver	73	4	11.0	.408	.278	.732	1.1	1.2	.5	.1	3.8
Kenny Payne	47	6	9.4	.360	.222	.897	1.4	.3	.2	.1	3.5
Robert Reid	3	0	12.3	.143			3.0	1.3	.3	1.0	1.3
Andre Turner	70	1	20.1	.439	.364	.736	2.2	4.4	.9	.0	5.9
Jayson Williams	52	1	9.8	.447	.500	.661	2.1	.3	.2	.1	3.5

=== Playoffs ===
Player	GP	GS	MPG	FG%	3P%	FT%	RPG	APG	SPG	BPG	PPG
Ron Anderson	8	0	27.9	.398	.200	.895	2.6	2.4	.8	.0	11.0
Charles Barkley	8	8	40.8	.592	.100	.653	10.5	6.0	1.9	.4	24.9
Manute Bol	8	0	13.6	.500		.667	2.4	.1	.1	1.5	3.0
Armen Gilliam	8	8	35.9	.462		.848	6.5	1.3	.6	.8	16.9
Rickey Green	8	8	24.9	.436	.750	.889	1.1	2.8	.9	.0	7.4
Hersey Hawkins	8	8	41.1	.465	.538	.937	5.8	3.4	2.5	1.3	20.9
Dave Hoppen	3	0	3.0	1.000		.000	1.0	.0	.0	.0	2.0
Rick Mahorn	8	8	26.0	.556		.786	5.3	1.8	.3	.5	6.4
Brian Oliver	4	0	3.8	.333		1.000	.0	.3	.3	.0	1.5
Robert Reid	7	0	5.9	.333	.000		1.1	.3	.1	.0	.9
Andre Turner	8	0	23.6	.438	.333	.813	1.6	4.4	1.4	.0	7.3
Jayson Williams	4	0	2.5	.800			1.0	.0	.0	.0	2.0

- ^{†} Denotes player spent time with another team in the season. Stats reflect time with the 7ers only.

Player statistics citation:

== Awards and records ==
- Charles Barkley, All-NBA First Team

== See also ==
- 1990–91 NBA season
