= 1990–91 Detroit Pistons season =

- Head coach: Chuck Daly
- General manager: Jack McCloskey
- Owners: William Davidson
- Arena: The Palace of Auburn Hills

Results
- Record: 50–32 (.610)
- Place: Division: 2nd (Central); Conference: 3rd (Eastern)
- Playoff finish: Eastern Conference finals (lost to Bulls 0–4)

Local media
- Television: WKBD; PASS Sports
- Radio: WWJ

The 1990–91 Detroit Pistons season was the 43rd season for the Detroit Pistons in the National Basketball Association, and their 34th season in Detroit, Michigan. The Pistons entered the regular season as both the 3-time defending Eastern Conference champions, and the 2-time defending NBA champions, after defeating the Portland Trail Blazers in five games in the 1990 NBA Finals, and looked to win a third consecutive title.

== Season summary ==
=== Regular season ===
The Pistons posted a nine-game winning streak in November as the team finished the first month of the regular season with a 13–2 record. However, the team lost six of their next seven games in December, but posted an 11-game winning streak between December and January, and later on held a 34–15 record at the All-Star break. Despite a five-game losing streak between February and March, the Pistons finished in second place in the Central Division with a 50–32 record, eleven games behind the Chicago Bulls, and earned the third seed in the Eastern Conference. The team qualified for the NBA playoffs for the eighth consecutive year.

Joe Dumars averaged 20.4 points and 5.5 assists per game, while Isiah Thomas averaged 16.2 points, 9.3 assists and 1.6 steals per game, but only played just 48 games due to a wrist injury, and sixth man Mark Aguirre provided the team with 14.2 points and 4.8 rebounds per game off the bench. In addition, James Edwards contributed 13.6 points per game, while Vinnie Johnson contributed 11.7 points and 3.3 assists per game off the bench, and Bill Laimbeer provided with 11.0 points and 9.0 rebounds per game. Meanwhile, Dennis Rodman averaged 8.2 points, led the team with 12.5 rebounds per game, and was named the NBA Defensive Player of the Year for the second consecutive year, and John Salley averaged 7.4 points, 4.4 rebounds and 1.5 blocks per game also off the bench.

During the NBA All-Star weekend at the Charlotte Coliseum in Charlotte, North Carolina, Thomas and Dumars were both selected for the 1991 NBA All-Star Game, as members of the Eastern Conference All-Star team, although Thomas did not participate due to his wrist injury. Dumars was named to the All-NBA Third Team, and to the NBA All-Defensive Second Team, while Rodman was selected to the NBA All-Defensive First Team. Thomas finished in 13th place in Most Valuable Player voting, while Dumars finished in 15th place; Dumars also finished in fourth place in Defensive Player of the Year voting, and head coach Chuck Daly finished in seventh place in Coach of the Year voting.

The Pistons finished second in the NBA in home-game attendance behind the Charlotte Hornets, with an attendance of 879,614 at The Palace of Auburn Hills during the regular season.

=== NBA playoffs ===
In the Eastern Conference First Round of the 1991 NBA playoffs, the Pistons faced off against the 6th–seeded Atlanta Hawks, a team that featured All-Star forward Dominique Wilkins, Doc Rivers and Kevin Willis. The Pistons lost Game 1 to the Hawks at home, 103–98 at The Palace of Auburn Hills, but managed to win the next two games to take a 2–1 series lead, before losing Game 4 to the Hawks on the road, 123–111 at the Omni Coliseum. With the series tied at 2–2, the Pistons won Game 5 over the Hawks at The Palace of Auburn Hills, 113–81 to win in a hard-fought five-game series.

In the Eastern Conference Semi-finals, the team faced off against the 2nd–seeded, and Atlantic Division champion Boston Celtics, who were led by the quartet of All-Star forward Larry Bird, Reggie Lewis, All-Star forward and sixth man Kevin McHale, and All-Star center Robert Parish. The Celtics took a 2–1 series lead, as the Pistons lost Game 3 at The Palace of Auburn Hills by a blowout loss, 115–83; the Pistons struggled only shooting .333 in field-goal percentage in Game 3. However, the Pistons managed to win the next three games, including a Game 6 win over the Celtics at The Palace of Auburn Hills in overtime, 117–113 to win the series in six games.

In their fifth consecutive Eastern Conference Finals appearance, and for the fourth consecutive year, the Pistons faced off against the top–seeded, and Central Division champion Bulls, who were led by the trio of All-Star guard, and Most Valuable Player of the Year, Michael Jordan, All-Star forward Scottie Pippen, and Horace Grant. The Pistons lost the first two games to the Bulls on the road at the Chicago Stadium, and then lost their next two home games, including a Game 4 loss to the Bulls at The Palace of Auburn Hills, 115–94, thus losing the series in a four-game sweep. The Pistons were unable to reach the NBA Finals for the fourth consecutive year.

The Bulls would advance to the NBA Finals for the first time in franchise history, and defeat the Los Angeles Lakers in five games in the 1991 NBA Finals, winning their first ever NBA championship.

=== Notable incidents ===
Towards the end of the loss to the Bulls in Game 4 at The Palace of Auburn Hills, most of the Pistons' players walked off the court towards the locker room without congratulating their opponents, or shaking hands. It was seen as a sign of disrespect by the outgoing champions, and was concocted by Laimbeer in response to comments made by Jordan, about the Pistons' physical playing style being bad for basketball, calling them "undeserving champions", and that he felt the league would be happy to see the Pistons lose.

=== Aftermath ===
Following the season, Edwards was traded to the Los Angeles Clippers, Johnson signed as a free agent with the San Antonio Spurs, and reserve center Scott Hastings was traded to the Denver Nuggets.

== Draft picks ==
Round	Pick	Player	Position	Nationality	College
1	26	Lance Blanks	PG/SG	United States	Texas

== Roster ==
1990–91 Detroit Pistons roster
Players

Pos.	No.	Player	Height	Weight	DOB	From
G/F	23	Mark Aguirre	6 ft 6 in (1.98 m)	232 lb (105 kg)	1959–12–10	DePaul
C	00	William Bedford	7 ft 0 in (2.13 m)	225 lb (102 kg)	1963–12–14	Memphis
G	32	Lance Blanks	6 ft 4 in (1.93 m)	190 lb (86 kg)	1966–09–09	Texas
G	4	Joe Dumars	6 ft 3 in (1.91 m)	190 lb (86 kg)	1963–05–24	McNeese State
C	53	James Edwards	7 ft 0 in (2.13 m)	225 lb (102 kg)	1955–11–22	Washington
F	35	Scott Hastings	6 ft 10 in (2.08 m)	235 lb (107 kg)	1960–06–03	Arkansas
G	12	Gerald Henderson	6 ft 2 in (1.88 m)	175 lb (79 kg)	1956–01–16	VCU
G	15	Vinnie Johnson	6 ft 2 in (1.88 m)	200 lb (91 kg)	1956–09–01	Baylor
F/C	40	Bill Laimbeer	6 ft 11 in (2.11 m)	245 lb (111 kg)	1957–05–19	Notre Dame
F	10	Dennis Rodman	6 ft 7 in (2.01 m)	210 lb (95 kg)	1961–05–13	SE Oklahoma State
C	30	Tree Rollins	7 ft 1 in (2.16 m)	235 lb (107 kg)	1955–06–16	Clemson
F/C	22	John Salley	6 ft 11 in (2.11 m)	230 lb (104 kg)	1964–05–16	Georgia Tech
G	11	Isiah Thomas	6 ft 1 in (1.85 m)	180 lb (82 kg)	1961–04–30	Indiana

Coaches
Head coach
- Chuck Daly
Assistant(s)
- Brendan Malone
- Brendan Suhr

Legend
- (DP) Unsigned draft pick
- (FA) Free agent
- (S) Suspended
- Injured

== Regular season ==
=== Season standings ===
Central Division	W	L	PCT	GB	Home	Road	Div
y-Chicago Bulls	61	21	.744	—	35–6	26–15	25–5
x-Detroit Pistons	50	32	.610	11	32–9	18–23	19–11
x-Milwaukee Bucks	48	34	.585	13	33–8	15–26	16–14
x-Atlanta Hawks	43	39	.524	18	29–12	14–27	11–19
x-Indiana Pacers	41	41	.500	20	29–12	12–29	15–15
Cleveland Cavaliers	33	49	.402	28	23–18	10–31	11–19
Charlotte Hornets	26	56	.317	35	17–24	9–32	8–22

#	Eastern Conference				
#	Team	W	L	PCT	GB
1	c-Chicago Bulls	61	21	.744	–
2	y-Boston Celtics	56	26	.683	5
3	x-Detroit Pistons	50	32	.610	11
4	x-Milwaukee Bucks	48	34	.585	13
5	x-Philadelphia 76ers	44	38	.537	17
6	x-Atlanta Hawks	43	39	.524	18
7	x-Indiana Pacers	41	41	.500	20
8	x-New York Knicks	39	43	.476	22
9	Cleveland Cavaliers	33	49	.402	28
10	Washington Bullets	30	52	.366	31
11	New Jersey Nets	26	56	.317	35
12	Charlotte Hornets	26	56	.317	35
13	Miami Heat	24	58	.293	37

z - clinched division title
y - clinched division title
x - clinched playoff spot

== Playoffs ==
1991 playoff game log
First Round: 3–2 (home: 2–1; road: 1–1)

Game	Date	Team	Score	High points	High rebounds	High assists	Location Attendance	Series
1	April 26	Atlanta	L 98–103	Joe Dumars (20)	Laimbeer, Rodman (11)	Isiah Thomas (14)	The Palace of Auburn Hills; 21,454	0–1
2	April 28	Atlanta	W 101–88	Joe Dumars (28)	Dennis Rodman (10)	Isiah Thomas (8)	The Palace of Auburn Hills; 21,454	1–1
3	April 30	@ Atlanta	W 103–91	Joe Dumars (30)	Dennis Rodman (13)	Isiah Thomas (13)	Omni Coliseum; 13,571	2–1
4	May 2	@ Atlanta	L 111–123	Vinnie Johnson (26)	Dennis Rodman (12)	Isiah Thomas (12)	Omni Coliseum; 9,854	2–2
5	May 5	Atlanta	W 113–81	Isiah Thomas (26)	Dennis Rodman (20)	Isiah Thomas (11)	The Palace of Auburn Hills; 21,454	3–2

Conference semifinals: 4–2 (home: 2–1; road: 2–1)

Game	Date	Team	Score	High points	High rebounds	High assists	Location Attendance	Series
1	May 7	@ Boston	W 86–75	James Edwards (18)	Dennis Rodman (16)	Isiah Thomas (13)	Boston Garden; 14,890	1–0
2	May 9	@ Boston	L 103–109	Joe Dumars (29)	Bill Laimbeer (15)	Joe Dumars (6)	Boston Garden; 14,890	1–1
3	May 11	Boston	L 83–115	James Edwards (13)	Laimbeer, Rodman (12)	Vinnie Johnson (5)	The Palace of Auburn Hills; 21,454	1–2
4	May 13	Boston	W 104–97	Mark Aguirre (34)	Dennis Rodman (18)	Joe Dumars (8)	The Palace of Auburn Hills; 21,454	2–2
5	May 15	@ Boston	W 116–111	Joe Dumars (32)	Dennis Rodman (10)	Joe Dumars (8)	Boston Garden; 14,890	3–2
6	May 17	Boston	W 117–113 (OT)	Joe Dumars (32)	Bill Laimbeer (14)	Joe Dumars (10)	The Palace of Auburn Hills; 21,454	4–2

Conference finals: 0–4 (home: 0–2; road: 0–2)

Game	Date	Team	Score	High points	High rebounds	High assists	Location Attendance	Series
1	May 19	@ Chicago	L 83–94	Mark Aguirre (25)	Dennis Rodman (9)	Isiah Thomas (8)	Chicago Stadium; 18,676	0–1
2	May 21	@ Chicago	L 97–105	Vinnie Johnson (29)	Dennis Rodman (11)	Dumars, Thomas (5)	Chicago Stadium; 18,676	0–2
3	May 25	Chicago	L 107–113	Isiah Thomas (29)	four players tied (7)	Isiah Thomas (6)	The Palace of Auburn Hills; 21,454	0–3
4	May 27	Chicago	L 94–115	Isiah Thomas (16)	Thomas, Johnson (7)	Isiah Thomas (5)	The Palace of Auburn Hills; 21,454	0–4

1991 schedule

== Player statistics ==
Legend
GP	Games played	GS	Games started	MPG	Minutes per game
FG%	Field-goal percentage	3P%	3-point field-goal percentage	FT%	Free-throw percentage
RPG	Rebounds per game	APG	Assists per game	SPG	Steals per game
BPG	Blocks per game	PPG	Points per game

=== Regular season ===
Player	GP	GS	MPG	FG%	3P%	FT%	RPG	APG	SPG	BPG	PPG
Joe Dumars	80	80	38.1	.481	.311	.890	2.3	5.5	1.1	0.1	20.4
Isiah Thomas	48	46	34.5	.435	.292	.782	3.3	9.3	1.6	0.2	16.2
Mark Aguirre	78	13	25.7	.462	.308	.757	4.8	1.8	0.6	0.3	14.2
James Edwards	72	70	26.4	.484	.500	.729	3.8	0.9	0.2	0.4	13.6
Vinnie Johnson	82	28	29.1	.434	.324	.646	3.4	3.3	0.9	0.2	11.7
Bill Laimbeer	82	81	32.5	.478	.296	.837	9.0	1.9	0.5	0.7	11.0
Dennis Rodman	82	77	33.5	.493	.200	.631	12.5	1.0	0.8	0.7	8.2
John Salley	74	1	22.3	.475	.000	.727	4.4	0.9	0.7	1.5	7.4
Gerald Henderson	23	10	17.0	.427	.333	.762	1.6	2.7	0.5	0.1	5.3
William Bedford	60	4	9.4	.438	.385	.705	2.2	0.5	0.0	0.6	4.5
John Long	25	0	10.2	.412	.333	.960	1.3	0.7	0.4	0.1	3.8
Scott Hastings	27	0	4.2	.571	.750	1.000	1.0	0.3	0.0	0.0	1.8
Lance Blanks	38	0	5.6	.426	.125	.714	0.5	0.7	0.2	0.1	1.7
Tree Rollins	37	0	5.5	.424		.571	1.1	0.1	0.1	0.5	1.0

=== Playoffs ===
Player	GP	GS	MPG	FG%	3P%	FT%	RPG	APG	SPG	BPG	PPG
Joe Dumars	15	15	39.2	.429	.405	.845	3.3	4.1	1.1	0.1	20.6
Mark Aguirre	15	2	26.5	.506	.364	.824	4.1	1.9	0.8	0.1	15.6
Vinnie Johnson	15	3	29.2	.464	.154	.710	5.1	2.9	0.7	0.3	15.2
Isiah Thomas	13	11	33.5	.403	.273	.725	4.2	8.5	1.0	0.2	13.5
Bill Laimbeer	15	15	29.7	.446	.294	.871	8.1	1.3	0.3	0.8	10.9
James Edwards	15	11	23.0	.407		.691	2.5	0.6	0.1	0.2	10.7
John Salley	15	0	20.5	.543		.600	4.1	0.7	0.4	1.3	7.5
Dennis Rodman	15	14	33.0	.451	.222	.417	11.8	0.9	0.7	0.7	6.3
William Bedford	8	3	8.1	.208	.000	.643	2.8	0.5	0.3	0.5	2.4
Gerald Henderson	10	1	4.0	.250	.000		0.1	0.6	0.1	0.0	0.8
Scott Hastings	10	0	3.5	.500	.500		0.6	0.3	0.0	0.1	0.8
Tree Rollins	6	0	5.3	1.000			0.5	0.0	0.2	0.2	0.7

Player Statistics Citation:

== Awards and records ==
- Dennis Rodman, NBA Defensive Player of the Year Award
- Joe Dumars, All-NBA Third Team
- Joe Dumars, NBA All-Defensive Second Team
- Dennis Rodman, NBA All-Defensive First Team

== See also ==
- 1990-91 NBA season
