= Gary Wortman =

American basketball coach (1941–2000)

Personal information
- Born: April 18, 1941
- Died: October 23, 2000 (aged 59)

Career information
- College: Seattle Pacific University
- Position: Head coach, Assistant coach
- Coaching career: ?–2000

Career history

Coaching
- ?–1988: Kentridge High School
- 1989–1992: Seattle SuperSonics (assistant)
- 1995–2000: Atlanta Hawks (assistant)

Gary Eber Wortman (April 18, 1941 – October 23, 2000) was an assistant coach in the National Basketball Association (NBA). He coached and scouted for the Seattle SuperSonics as well as the Atlanta Hawks during his career with the NBA.

== Player ==
Wortman played at Seattle Pacific University under head coach Les Habegger, who also become the general manager of the Sonics during 1983 until 1985.

== Career ==
=== Kentridge High School ===
Wortman coached at Kentridge High School.

=== Seattle SuperSonics ===
Wortman was hired as an assistant coach and scout for the Seattle SuperSonics. He worked with the Sonics for three years, where he was known for great relationships with both players and coaching staff.

=== Atlanta Hawks ===
Wortman spent his last years in the NBA as an assistant coach for the Atlanta Hawks. He would remain assistant coach for the team until his death in 2000.

== Death ==
On October 27, 2000, Wortman died from brain cancer at the age of 59.
