= 1991 NBA All-Star Game =

Exhibition basketball game

	1	2	3	4	Total
West	23	35	34	22	114
East	22	45	27	22	116
- Date: February 10, 1991
- Arena: Charlotte Coliseum
- City: Charlotte
- MVP: Charles Barkley
- National anthem: Bruce Hornsby, Branford Marsalis
- Attendance: 23,530
- Network: NBC; TNT (All-Star Saturday)
- Announcers: Bob Costas, Mike Fratello and Pat Riley; Bob Neal, Doug Collins and Hubie Brown (All-Star Saturday)

NBA All-Star Game
< 1990	1992 >

The 1991 NBA All-Star Game was an exhibition basketball game between players selected from the National Basketball Association's Western Conference and the Eastern Conference that was played on February 10, 1991, at the Charlotte Coliseum in Charlotte, North Carolina, home of the Charlotte Hornets. This game was the 41st edition of the NBA All-Star Game and was played during the 1990–91 NBA season.

The All-Star Weekend began on Saturday, February 9, 1991, with the Stay In School Jam, Legends Classic, the Three-Point Shootout and the Slam Dunk Contest.

This was the first NBA All-Star Game broadcast by NBC after 17 years with CBS.

The East narrowly beat the West, 116–114. Kevin Johnson's potential game-winning three-pointer for the West was nullified by a basket interference call on Karl Malone. Charles Barkley was named as the game's Most Valuable Player after scoring 17 points and grabbing 22 rebounds.

The All-Star Game returned to Charlotte in 2019, though it was played at the Spectrum Center in Uptown and hosted by the second incarnation of the franchise, and broadcast on TNT (the All-Star Game has never been broadcast on ABC or ESPN during the networks' current contract with the league, which began during the 2002–03 season).

== Coaches ==
Rick Adelman, head coach of the Portland Trail Blazers, was named as coach of the Western All-Stars. Chris Ford, head coach of the Boston Celtics, was named as coach of the Eastern All-Stars. Both were determined by the best conference record at a pre-determined date mid-season before the All-Star Game, set in January.

The 1991 game was the first to implement the "Pat Riley Rule," which prohibits a coach from coaching an All-Star team in consecutive seasons. In such cases, the honor passes to the coach of the team with the next-best record in the same conference, with tiebreakers favoring the coach who has either never coached the game or hasn't done so less recently. The rule was established following its namesake's six consecutive appearances from 1985 to 1990, the second longest streak after Red Auerbach's eleven.

== Rosters ==
Eastern Conference All-Stars
Pos.	Player	Team	Appearance
Starters
G	Isiah Thomas^{DNP}	Detroit Pistons	10th
G	Michael Jordan	Chicago Bulls	7th
F	Larry Bird^{DNP}	Boston Celtics	11th
F	Charles Barkley	Philadelphia 76ers	5th
C	Patrick Ewing	New York Knicks	5th
Reserves
F	Dominique Wilkins	Atlanta Hawks	6th
G	Ricky Pierce	Milwaukee Bucks	1st
G	Hersey Hawkins	Philadelphia 76ers	1st
F	Kevin McHale	Boston Celtics	7th
C	Brad Daugherty	Cleveland Cavaliers	3rd
G	Alvin Robertson	Milwaukee Bucks	4th
C	Robert Parish	Boston Celtics	9th
F	Bernard King^{ST}	Washington Bullets	4th
G	Joe Dumars^{ST}	Detroit Pistons	2nd
Head coach: Chris Ford (Boston Celtics)

Western Conference All-Stars
Pos.	Player	Team	Appearance
Starters
G	Magic Johnson	Los Angeles Lakers	11th
G	Kevin Johnson	Phoenix Suns	2nd
F	Chris Mullin	Golden State Warriors	3rd
F	Karl Malone	Utah Jazz	4th
C	David Robinson	San Antonio Spurs	2nd
Reserves
F	James Worthy	Los Angeles Lakers	6th
G	Clyde Drexler	Portland Trail Blazers	5th
C	Kevin Duckworth	Portland Trail Blazers	2nd
F	Tom Chambers	Phoenix Suns	4th
G	Terry Porter	Portland Trail Blazers	1st
G	Tim Hardaway	Golden State Warriors	1st
G	John Stockton	Utah Jazz	3rd
Head coach: Rick Adelman (Portland Trail Blazers)

- ^DNPEven though they were selected, Isiah Thomas and Larry Bird couldn't play due to injuries. Hersey Hawkins was selected as Bird's replacement, and no replacement was named for Thomas, as his inability to play was already known at the time coaches voted for the reserves, and thus voted for 8 reserves rather than the usual 7, thus filling in his spot through voting in an extra reserve. ("Because a wrist injury will keep Detroit’s Isiah Thomas out of the All-Star Game, coaches picked eight reserves instead of the usual seven for the East team." Located at -"Worthy and 3 Blazers Join the All-Stars," L.A. Times Archives, Jan. 29, 1991 12 AM PT, https://www.latimes.com/archives/la-xpm-1991-01-29-sp-443-story.html)
- ^STEastern Conference head coach Chris Ford chose Joe Dumars and Bernard King to start in place of the injured Thomas and Bird.

== All-Star Weekend ==
=== Legends Classic ===
The 8th edition of the Schick Legends Classic took place on February 9, 1991. It consisted of an exhibition match between retired players from the Eastern and Western Conference. The East Legends won 41–34.

==== Rosters ====
Eastern Conference Legends
Pos.	Player	Age	Last NBA season
C	Tommy Burleson	38	1980–81 (Atlanta Hawks)
F/C	Dave Cowens	42	1982–83 (Milwaukee Bucks)
F/G	Dave DeBusschere	50	1973–74 (New York Knicks)
G	Phil Ford	35	1984–85 (Houston Rockets)
F	Bobby Jones	39	1985–86 (Philadelphia 76ers)
F/C	Jerry Lucas	50	1973–74 (New York Knicks)
F/G	Jack Marin	46	1976–77 (Chicago Bulls)
F/G	Oscar Robertson	52	1973–74 (Milwaukee Bucks)
F/G	Charlie Scott	42	1979–80 (Denver Nuggets)
F/G	David Thompson	36	1983–84 (Seattle SuperSonics)
Head coach: Frank McGuire

Western Conference Legends
Pos.	Player	Age	Last NBA season
F	Rick Barry	46	1979–80 (Houston Rockets)
G	Phil Chenier	40	1980–81 (Golden State Warriors)
F/G	George Gervin	38	1985–86 (Chicago Bulls)
C	Artis Gilmore	41	1987–88 (Boston Celtics)
F/C	Maurice Lucas	38	1987–88 (Portland Trail Blazers)
G	Calvin Murphy	42	1982–83 (Houston Rockets)
F/G	Sam Jones	57	1968–69 (Boston Celtics)
C	Clifford Ray	42	1980–81 (Golden State Warriors)
F/C	Dan Roundfield	37	1986–87 (Washington Bullets)
F/G	Jamaal Wilkes	37	1985–86 (Los Angeles Clippers)
Head coach: Jack Ramsay

=== Slam Dunk Contest ===
The Gatorade Slam Dunk Contest had three of the previous year's contestants, with the notable absence of defending champion Dominique Wilkins. Dee Brown took home the trophy after defeating Shawn Kemp in the final, performing a dunk while covering his eyes with one arm. The scoring system consisted of the total of the two dunks, and in the final round the two best out of three dunks.

Contestants
Pos.	Player	Team	First Round			Semifinal			Final			
Pos.	Player	Team	1st dunk	2nd dunk	Total	1st dunk	2nd dunk	Total	1st dunk	2nd dunk	3rd dunk	Total
G	Dee Brown	Boston Celtics	48.2	44.2	92.4	49.6	48.4	98.0	48.1	46.4	49.6	97.7
F/C	Shawn Kemp	Seattle SuperSonics	47.6	48.2	95.8	48.3	47.3	95.6	44.3	48.0	45.7	93.7
G	Rex Chapman	Charlotte Hornets	45.5	49.7	95.2	49.0	46.0	94.0	Did not advance			
G	Kenny Smith	Houston Rockets	48.5	42.3	90.8	46.6	41.3	87.9	Did not advance			
F	Kenny Williams	Indiana Pacers	42.3	44.6	86.9	Did not advance						
F/G	Blue Edwards	Utah Jazz	40.1	44.2	84.3	Did not advance						
F/G	Otis Smith	Orlando Magic	41.2	41.8	83.0	Did not advance						
G	Kendall Gill	Charlotte Hornets	40.1	40.9	81.0	Did not advance						

=== Three-Point Shootout ===
The American Airlines–ITT Sheraton Three-Point Shootout saw Craig Hodges repeat as champion, by defeating Portland's Terry Porter in the final round. Players begin shooting from one corner of the court, and move from station to station along the three-point arc until they reach the other corner. Each station has four standard balls, worth one point each, plus one specially colored "money ball", worth two points.

Contestants
Pos.	Player	Team	First round	Semifinal	Final
G	Craig Hodges	Chicago Bulls	20	24	17
G	Terry Porter	Portland Trail Blazers	15^{TIE}	14	12
F	Dennis Scott	Orlando Magic	16	12	Did not advance
F/G	Danny Ainge	Portland Trail Blazers	18	11	Did not advance
G	Tim Hardaway	Golden State Warriors	15^{TIE}	Did not advance	
G	Hersey Hawkins	Philadelphia 76ers	14	Did not advance	
F	Glen Rice	Miami Heat	9	Did not advance	
F/G	Clyde Drexler	Portland Trail Blazers	8	Did not advance	

^TIE Terry Porter and Tim Hardaway broke the tie in a 30-second shooting round.
