= 1991 NBA Finals =

1991 basketball championship series

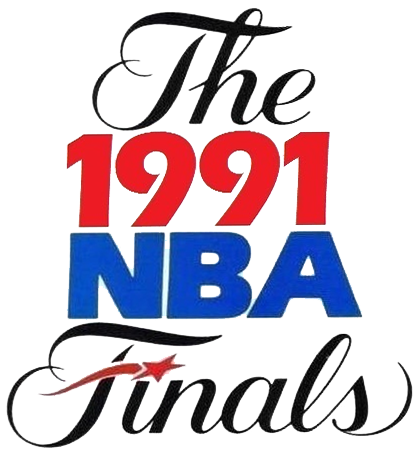
Team	Coach	Wins
Chicago Bulls	Phil Jackson	4
Los Angeles Lakers	Mike Dunleavy	1
- Dates: June 2–12
- MVP: Michael Jordan (Chicago Bulls)
- Hall of Famers: Lakers: Vlade Divac (2019); Magic Johnson (2002); James Worthy (2003); Bulls: Michael Jordan (2009); Scottie Pippen (2010); Coaches: Phil Jackson (2007); Tex Winter (2011); Officials: Dick Bavetta (2015); Hugh Evans (2022); Darell Garretson (2016)
- Eastern finals: Bulls defeated Pistons, 4–0
- Western finals: Lakers defeated Trail Blazers, 4–2

The 1991 NBA Finals was the championship series of the National Basketball Association's (NBA) 1990–91 season, and the conclusion of the season's playoffs. It was also the first NBA Finals broadcast by NBC after 17 years with CBS.

The Eastern Conference champion Chicago Bulls took on the Western Conference champion Los Angeles Lakers for the title, with Chicago having home court advantage. It was Michael Jordan's first NBA Finals appearance, Magic Johnson's last, and the last NBA Finals for the Lakers until 2000. The Bulls would win the series, 4–1. Jordan averaged 31.2 points on 56% shooting, 11.4 assists, 6.6 rebounds, 2.8 steals and 1.4 blocks en route to his first NBA Finals MVP Award.

The series was not the first time that the Bulls and Lakers faced off in the playoffs. Prior to 1991, they met for four postseason series (1968, 1971, 1972 and 1973), all Lakers victories. Chicago was a member of the Western Conference at the time and moved into the East in 1980. The 1991 Finals marked the first time the Bulls defeated the Lakers in a playoff series.

This series would mark the end of the Lakers Showtime era and the beginning of the Bulls' dynasty. After winning five championships in eight finals appearances in the 1980s, the Lakers would enter a period of mediocrity for most of the 1990s before winning five championships between the 2000 and 2010 seasons.

The 1991 Lakers were led by Johnson, who was 31 and playing in what would be his last full season, as well as fellow All-Star teammate James Worthy; Kareem Abdul-Jabbar had retired two seasons earlier. The Bulls, led by Jordan and small forward Scottie Pippen, would win five more championships after 1991 in a seven-year span, cementing their status as a dynasty. Jordan became only the fourth player in NBA history (after Joe Fulks, George Mikan, and Abdul-Jabbar) to capture the scoring title and a championship in the same season.

== Background ==
This was the first meeting between teams from Chicago and Los Angeles for a major professional sports championship since the 1959 World Series.

=== Chicago Bulls ===
The 1990–91 season marked the Bulls' 25th in franchise history. The team was coming off a grueling seven-game loss to the Detroit Pistons in the 1990 Eastern Conference finals, and in the six years since Michael Jordan joined the Bulls, they were showing signs of improvement.

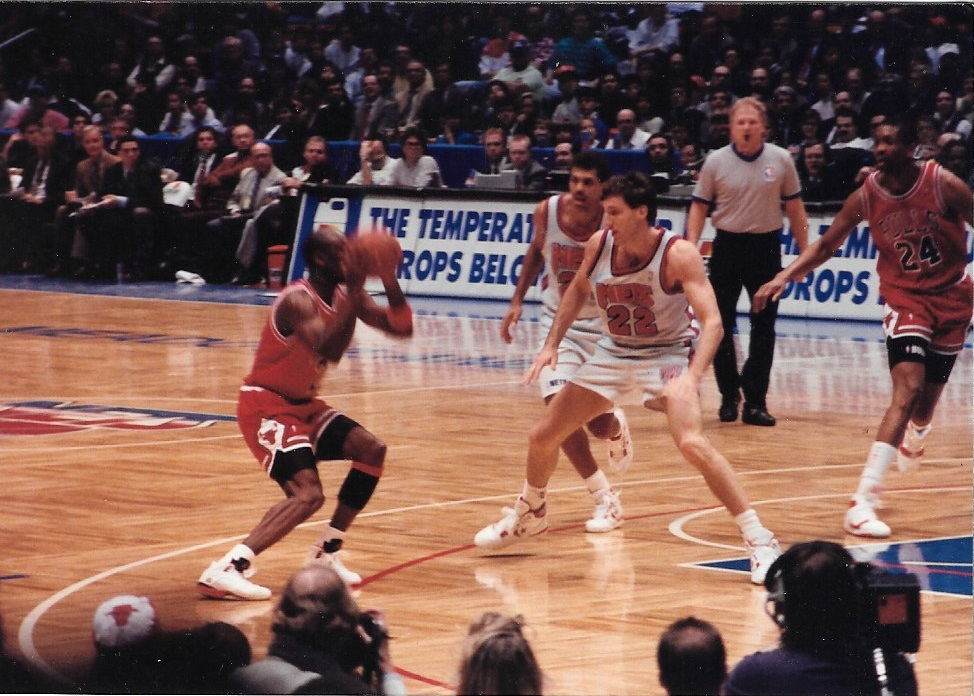
Jordan, with the ball, against the New Jersey Nets during the 1990–91 season.

They managed to put it all together that season, winning a then-franchise record 61 games. Jordan won the scoring title for a fifth consecutive season, but the team was no longer a one-man show of years past. Instead, Jordan distributed the ball with regularity, thanks in large part to the triangle offense instituted by head coach Phil Jackson and assistant Tex Winter. This gave the Bulls additional offensive weapons to choose from, ranging from wingman Scottie Pippen and post players Horace Grant and Bill Cartwright to shooters such as John Paxson and B. J. Armstrong. Jordan's improved all-around play earned him his second MVP award.

In the playoffs, the Bulls lost only once in the first three rounds. They swept the New York Knicks in the first round, then eliminated the Philadelphia 76ers in the second round. Their much-awaited rematch with the Detroit Pistons in the Conference finals showcased the maturity and poise that the Bulls displayed all season, as they swept the Pistons. In a last show of defiance, most of the Pistons walked off the court with :08 left on the clock in a blowout loss at home so as not to congratulate the new Eastern Conference champions, though Joe Dumars, Vinnie Johnson, and John Salley did remain to shake the Bulls' hands.

=== Los Angeles Lakers ===
The Lakers were coming off a second-round loss to the Phoenix Suns in prior season's playoffs. Even though the Lakers won 63 games that season, and Magic Johnson was second in league MVP voting while surpassing Oscar Robertson for the all-time career assist record, it was clear that the team was growing weary of head coach Pat Riley's intense approach.

The Lakers replaced Riley with Mike Dunleavy, Sr., formerly an assistant coach with the Milwaukee Bucks. Dunleavy then abandoned the trademark Showtime offense in favor of a more deliberate style of play, but despite the change in playbook, the Lakers still enjoyed an impressive season, winning 58 games.

In the playoffs, the Lakers swept the Houston Rockets in the first round, then eliminated Run TMC and the Golden State Warriors in the second round. Next up for the Lakers were the Portland Trail Blazers, who were coming off a trip to the NBA finals the previous year. The Lakers stunned the Blazers in Portland to open the series, and went on to win the conference finals in six games.

=== Road to the Finals ===
Los Angeles Lakers (Western Conference champion)		Chicago Bulls (Eastern Conference champion)
# / Western Conference; # / Team / W / L / PCT / GB; 1 / z-Portland Trail Blazers / 63 / 19 / .768 / –; 2 / y-San Antonio Spurs / 55 / 27 / .671 / 8; 3 / x-Los Angeles Lakers / 58 / 24 / .707 / 5; 4 / x-Phoenix Suns / 55 / 27 / .671 / 8; 5 / x-Utah Jazz / 54 / 28 / .659 / 9; 6 / x-Houston Rockets / 52 / 30 / .634 / 11; 7 / x-Golden State Warriors / 44 / 38 / .537 / 19; 8 / x-Seattle SuperSonics / 41 / 41 / .500 / 22; 9 / Orlando Magic / 31 / 51 / .378 / 32; 10 / Los Angeles Clippers / 31 / 51 / .378 / 32; 11 / Minnesota Timberwolves / 29 / 53 / .354 / 34; 12 / Dallas Mavericks / 28 / 54 / .341 / 35; 13 / Sacramento Kings / 25 / 57 / .305 / 38; 14 / Denver Nuggets / 20 / 62 / .244 / 43; 3rd seed in the West, 3rd best league record	Regular season	# / Eastern Conference; # / Team / W / L / PCT / GB; 1 / c-Chicago Bulls / 61 / 21 / .744 / –; 2 / y-Boston Celtics / 56 / 26 / .683 / 5; 3 / x-Detroit Pistons / 50 / 32 / .610 / 11; 4 / x-Milwaukee Bucks / 48 / 34 / .585 / 13; 5 / x-Philadelphia 76ers / 44 / 38 / .537 / 17; 6 / x-Atlanta Hawks / 43 / 39 / .524 / 18; 7 / x-Indiana Pacers / 41 / 41 / .500 / 20; 8 / x-New York Knicks / 39 / 43 / .476 / 22; 9 / Cleveland Cavaliers / 33 / 49 / .402 / 28; 10 / Washington Bullets / 30 / 52 / .366 / 31; 11 / New Jersey Nets / 26 / 56 / .317 / 35; 12 / Charlotte Hornets / 26 / 56 / .317 / 35; 13 / Miami Heat / 24 / 58 / .293 / 37; 1st seed in the East, 2nd best league record
Defeated the (6) Houston Rockets, 3–0	First round	Defeated the (8) New York Knicks, 3–0
Defeated the (7) Golden State Warriors, 4–1	Conference semifinals	Defeated the (5) Philadelphia 76ers, 4–1
Defeated the (1) Portland Trail Blazers, 4–2	Conference finals	Defeated the (3) Detroit Pistons, 4–0

=== Regular season series ===
Both teams split the two meetings, each won by the home team:

December 21, 1990

Los Angeles Lakers 103, Chicago Bulls 114

Chicago Stadium, Chicago, Illinois

February 3, 1991

Chicago Bulls 86, Los Angeles Lakers 99

Great Western Forum, Inglewood, California

== 1991 NBA Finals team rosters ==
=== Chicago Bulls ===
1990–91 Chicago Bulls roster
Players

Pos.	No.	Player	Height	Weight	DOB	From
PG	10	B. J. Armstrong	6 ft 2 in (1.88 m)	175 lb (79 kg)	1967-09-09	Iowa
C	24	Bill Cartwright	7 ft 1 in (2.16 m)	245 lb (111 kg)	1957-07-30	San Francisco
PF	54	Horace Grant	6 ft 10 in (2.08 m)	245 lb (111 kg)	1965-07-04	Clemson
SG	14	Craig Hodges	6 ft 2 in (1.88 m)	190 lb (86 kg)	1960-06-27	Long Beach State
SG	2	Dennis Hopson	6 ft 5 in (1.96 m)	200 lb (91 kg)	1965-04-22	Ohio State
SG	23	Michael Jordan	6 ft 6 in (1.98 m)	215 lb (98 kg)	1963-02-17	North Carolina
PF	34	Stacey King	6 ft 11 in (2.11 m)	230 lb (104 kg)	1967-01-29	Oklahoma
PF	53	Cliff Levingston	6 ft 8 in (2.03 m)	230 lb (104 kg)	1961-01-04	Wichita State
PG	5	John Paxson	6 ft 2 in (1.88 m)	185 lb (84 kg)	1959-06-13	Notre Dame
C	32	Will Perdue	7 ft 0 in (2.13 m)	240 lb (109 kg)	1965-08-29	Vanderbilt
SF	33	Scottie Pippen	6 ft 7 in (2.01 m)	220 lb (100 kg)	1965-09-25	Central Arkansas
PF	42	Scott Williams	6 ft 10 in (2.08 m)	230 lb (104 kg)	1968-03-21	North Carolina

Coaches
Head coach
- Phil Jackson
Assistant(s)
- Johnny Bach
- Jim Cleamons
- Tex Winter

Legend
- (DP) Unsigned draft pick
- (FA) Free agent
- (S) Suspended
- Injured

=== Los Angeles Lakers ===
1990–91 Los Angeles Lakers roster
Players

Pos.	No.	Player	Height	Weight	DOB	From
PF	41	Elden Campbell	6 ft 11 in (2.11 m)	215 lb (98 kg)	1968-07-23	Clemson
C	12	Vlade Divac	7 ft 1 in (2.16 m)	243 lb (110 kg)	1968-02-03	SFR Yugoslavia
PG	10	Larry Drew	6 ft 1 in (1.85 m)	170 lb (77 kg)	1958-04-02	Missouri
PF	45	A.C. Green	6 ft 9 in (2.06 m)	220 lb (100 kg)	1963-10-04	Oregon State
PG	32	Magic Johnson	6 ft 9 in (2.06 m)	215 lb (98 kg)	1959-08-14	Michigan State
PF	14	Sam Perkins	6 ft 9 in (2.06 m)	235 lb (107 kg)	1961-06-14	North Carolina
SG	4	Byron Scott (injured)	6 ft 3 in (1.91 m)	195 lb (88 kg)	1961-03-28	Arizona State
SG	34	Tony Smith	6 ft 3 in (1.91 m)	185 lb (84 kg)	1968-06-14	Marquette
SG	20	Terry Teagle	6 ft 5 in (1.96 m)	195 lb (88 kg)	1960-04-10	Baylor
PF	30	Irving Thomas	6 ft 8 in (2.03 m)	225 lb (102 kg)	1966-01-02	Florida State
C	43	Mychal Thompson	6 ft 10 in (2.08 m)	226 lb (103 kg)	1955-01-30	Minnesota
SF	42	James Worthy (injured)	6 ft 9 in (2.06 m)	225 lb (102 kg)	1961-02-27	North Carolina

Coaches
Head coach
- Mike Dunleavy, Sr.
Assistant(s)
- Bill Bertka
- Jim Eyen
- Randy Pfund

Legend
- (DP) Unsigned draft pick
- (FA) Free agent
- (S) Suspended
- Injured

== Series summary ==
Game	Date	Road team	Result	Home team
Game 1	June 2	Los Angeles Lakers	93–91 (1–0)	Chicago Bulls
Game 2	June 5	Los Angeles Lakers	86–107 (1–1)	Chicago Bulls
Game 3	June 7	Chicago Bulls	104–96 (OT) (2–1)	Los Angeles Lakers
Game 4	June 9	Chicago Bulls	97–82 (3–1)	Los Angeles Lakers
Game 5	June 12	Chicago Bulls	108–101 (4–1)	Los Angeles Lakers

=== Game 1 ===
NBC

June 2
3:30 pm EDT

Los Angeles Lakers 93, Chicago Bulls 91
Scoring by quarter: 29–30, 22–23, 24–15, 18–23
Pts: Perkins, Worthy 22 each Rebs: Vlade Divac 14; Asts: Magic Johnson 11	Pts: Michael Jordan 36; Rebs: Horace Grant 10; Asts: Michael Jordan 12
Los Angeles leads the series, 1–0

Chicago Stadium, Chicago, Illinois
Referees:
- No. 25 Hugh Evans
- No. 14 Jack Madden
- No. 42 Hue Hollins

Michael Jordan started dominating with 15 points, 3 rebounds and 5 assists in the first quarter alone. In the second quarter, the Lakers continued to stay competitive despite Magic Johnson not attempting one field goal in the second quarter. Despite this, Johnson would hit back-to-back 3 pointers in the third quarter to give the Lakers their largest lead, and also Johnson's 29th career playoff triple-double. Jordan made a comeback in the fourth quarter with 13 points, but it was Scottie Pippen's two free throws that would give the Bulls a 91–89 lead. Each team ran the shot clock down but neither could hit a shot until Sam Perkins hit a 3-pointer (the potential game winner) with 14 seconds left to give the Lakers a 92–91 lead. Jordan's 17-foot jumper then rattled out and was rebounded by Byron Scott, who was fouled with 2.7 seconds remaining. Scott missed the first of his two free throws and made the second for a 93–91 Lakers lead. The Bulls, out of timeouts, had a final chance, but a midcourt heave from Pippen at the buzzer caromed off the back of the rim.

This was also the last time any game of the NBA Finals aired in the afternoon (Eastern Time Zone), with every game of the NBA Finals since this game in 1991 airing in prime time, including all weekend games. To date, this is the most recent time any finals game in any of the four major American sports leagues started before 6:00 p.m. Eastern.

=== Game 2 ===
NBC

June 5
9:00 pm EDT

Los Angeles Lakers 86, Chicago Bulls 107
Scoring by quarter: 23–28, 20–20, 26–38, 17–21
Pts: James Worthy 24; Rebs: Green, Johnson 7 each Asts: Magic Johnson 10	Pts: Michael Jordan 33; Rebs: Jordan, Perdue 7 each Asts: Michael Jordan 13
Series tied, 1–1

Chicago Stadium, Chicago, Illinois
Referees:
- No. 11 Jake O'Donnell
- No. 20 Jess Kersey
- No. 13 Mike Mathis

"Oh! A SPECTACULAR move by Michael Jordan!"

— NBC play-by-play announcer Marv Albert after Jordan's 13th straight point on a mid-air, switch-handed layup. This would be one of Albert's most iconic calls.

The biggest decision of the game was putting Scottie Pippen on Magic Johnson, while Michael Jordan guarded Vlade Divac and also switched to the point guard position for the rest of the series. For the Bulls, the hero was Horace Grant who led the Bulls with 14 first half points, while Jordan only had 2 points for the first 20 minutes; however, for Jordan, this shooting drought would only prove to be temporary and Jordan would hit his next 13 shots in compensation, capped by the signature moment of the series came when Jordan accelerated towards the basket, raised the ball in his right hand for a dunk, then, to avoid a potential Sam Perkins block, switched the ball to his left and banked in a layup that caused a booming standing ovation at Chicago Stadium. This would go on to be one of the most memorable plays in NBA Finals history. The Lakers were in the game even when Chicago was leading 58–51 until Byron Scott fouled Pippen, and the Bulls would make 17 of their next 20 field goals in the third quarter despite Jordan spending time on the bench with foul trouble. By the time Jordan returned, their lead was 16 and then Jordan led the Bulls to an 11–0 run to a Bulls victory.

=== Game 3 ===
NBC

June 7
9:00 pm EDT

Chicago Bulls 104, Los Angeles Lakers 96 (OT)
Scoring by quarter: 25–25, 23–22, 18–25, 26–20, Overtime: 12–4
Pts: Michael Jordan 29; Rebs: Scottie Pippen 13; Asts: Michael Jordan 9	Pts: Sam Perkins 25; Rebs: Sam Perkins 9 Asts: Magic Johnson 10
Chicago leads the series, 2–1

Great Western Forum, Inglewood, California
Referees:
- No. 10 Darell Garretson
- No. 17 Joey Crawford
- No. 21 Bill Oakes

The Bulls were having trouble in the frontcourt (in Game 1, the Lakers frontcourt outscored Chicago's 60–31). In Game 3, the Lakers would be the ones having trouble, setting a rebounding low in the Finals. Despite this problem, the Lakers went for an 18–2 run that brought them from 3 down (49–52) to 13 up (67–54). The Bulls would answer with a 20–7 run that would tie the game in the 4th quarter at 74. Horace Grant's layup gave the Bulls a 90–87 lead with 1:07 to play. Perkins then scored to cut the Bulls' lead to 90–89 with 49 seconds left. After a Bulls' miss, Divac scored on a layup and was fouled. He made the free throw to give the Lakers a 92–90 lead with 10.9 seconds remaining. Jordan made a 14-foot jump shot just inches away from Divac's fingertips with 3.4 seconds left to tie the game at 92 and force overtime. In overtime, Jordan would score half of the Bulls' 12 points to win the game.

=== Game 4 ===
NBC

June 9
7:00 pm EDT

Chicago Bulls 97, Los Angeles Lakers 82
Scoring by quarter: 27–28, 25–16, 22–14, 23–24
Pts: Michael Jordan 28; Rebs: Scottie Pippen 9 Asts: Michael Jordan 13	Pts: Vlade Divac 27; Rebs: Vlade Divac 11; Asts: Magic Johnson 11
Chicago leads the series, 3–1

Great Western Forum, Inglewood, California
Referees:
- No. 25 Hugh Evans
- No. 4 Ed T. Rush
- No. 27 Dick Bavetta

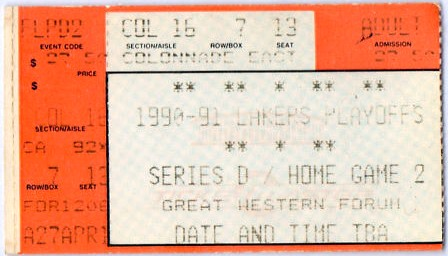
A ticket for Game 4 of the 1991 NBA Finals at the Great Western Forum.

The Lakers had a 28–27 lead in the first quarter; only the second time in the 1991 playoffs that a team led the Bulls at the end of the first quarter. This did not matter as Chicago went on a 19–9 run to start the second period and gain a 46–37 lead. While Michael Jordan scored 11 points in the second quarter, the Lakers only made 12 of their 41 shots in the second and third quarters. The Lakers faced a huge blow as Worthy and Scott left the game (and eventually the series) with ankle and shoulder injuries, respectively (Worthy's ankle injury from the Conference finals against Portland had flared up, and Scott injured his shoulder after slipping on a wet spot on the floor). With the lack of Worthy and Scott, and bad shooting (especially from Sam Perkins), the Bulls were able to take a 16-point lead in the third quarter. The Lakers refused to go down and shrank the deficit to 7 points in the fourth quarter, but it was the closest they would get, as Pippen and Jordan led the Bulls on a 19–8 run to put them one game away from their first NBA Championship.

=== Game 5 ===
NBC

June 12
9:00 pm EDT

Chicago Bulls 108, Los Angeles Lakers 101
Scoring by quarter: 27–25, 21–24, 32–31, 28–21
Pts: Scottie Pippen 32; Rebs: Scottie Pippen 13; Asts: Michael Jordan 10	Pts: Sam Perkins 22; Rebs: Magic Johnson 11; Asts: Magic Johnson 20
Chicago wins the NBA Finals, 4–1

Great Western Forum, Inglewood, California
Referees:
- No. 11 Jake O'Donnell
- No. 14 Jack Madden
- No. 13 Mike Mathis

The Lakers were facing elimination, and the absences of James Worthy and Byron Scott increased the difficulty for the Lakers. This would not stop Magic Johnson who added 20 assists and 11 rebounds. Jordan guarded Magic Johnson in Game 5 which led Magic to struggle by scoring 16 points on 33% (4/12) shooting with 6 turnovers. Elden Campbell outscored Michael Jordan with 13 points in the first half. The Lakers still fought and even led 93–90 in the fourth quarter, but the Bulls went on a 9–0 run, and Paxson's 10 points in the final half of the fourth quarter helped secure the Chicago Bulls', and Jordan's, first NBA title. It was the only one of the Bulls' six Finals appearances to end in four games to one. This was also the last NBA Finals game to be played in The Forum (by the time the Lakers returned to the NBA Finals, they had moved to the new Staples Center).

Scottie Pippen led the Bulls with 32 points and collected 13 rebounds. Jordan, who was named the Finals MVP, added 30 points and 10 assists.

== Player statistics ==
Legend
GP	Games played	GS	Games started	MPG	Minutes per game
FG%	Field-goal percentage	3P%	3-point field-goal percentage	FT%	Free-throw percentage
RPG	Rebounds per game	APG	Assists per game	SPG	Steals per game
BPG	Blocks per game	PPG	Points per game

Chicago Bulls

Chicago Bulls statistics
Player	GP	GS	MPG	FG%	3P%	FT%	RPG	APG	SPG	BPG	PPG
B. J. Armstrong	5	0	7.4	.455	.000	.000	0.6	0.8	0.4	0.0	2.0
Bill Cartwright	5	5	32.0	.435	.000	.667	5.0	2.4	0.6	0.6	8.8
Horace Grant	5	5	39.6	.627	.000	.750	7.8	1.6	1.6	0.6	14.6
Craig Hodges	5	0	10.6	.391	.167	.000	0.6	0.2	0.0	0.0	3.8
Dennis Hopson	1	0	2.0	.000	.000	.000	0.0	0.0	0.0	0.0	0.0
Michael Jordan	5	5	44.0	.558	.500	.848	6.6	11.4	2.8	1.4	31.2
Stacey King	2	0	3.0	.000	.000	1.000	0.5	0.0	0.0	0.0	1.0
Cliff Levingston	5	0	18.0	.615	.000	.000	2.8	0.6	1.0	1.0	3.2
John Paxson	5	5	31.8	.653	.250	1.000	2.0	3.4	1.0	0.0	13.4
Will Perdue	5	0	7.4	.600	.000	1.000	2.4	0.2	0.0	0.2	1.6
Scottie Pippen	5	5	43.6	.453	.200	.862	9.4	6.6	2.4	1.0	20.8
Scott Williams	4	0	11.3	.500	.000	.667	2.3	0.8	0.0	0.3	2.0

Los Angeles Lakers

Los Angeles Lakers statistics
Player	GP	GS	MPG	FG%	3P%	FT%	RPG	APG	SPG	BPG	PPG
Elden Campbell	3	0	11.0	.625	.000	.750	1.3	0.0	1.0	0.7	7.7
Vlade Divac	5	5	41.6	.565	.000	1.000	8.8	2.0	1.8	2.4	18.2
Larry Drew	4	0	5.0	.375	.000	.500	0.5	0.0	0.0	0.0	1.8
A.C. Green	5	1	22.6	.313	.667	.583	5.6	0.2	0.6	0.0	5.8
Magic Johnson	5	5	45.6	.431	.286	.951	8.0	12.4	1.2	0.0	18.6
Sam Perkins	5	5	41.2	.406	.385	.759	7.6	1.0	0.4	1.4	16.6
Byron Scott	4	4	35.0	.278	.200	.700	1.8	1.8	0.8	0.0	4.5
Tony Smith	2	0	16.0	.714	.000	.667	0.5	1.0	0.5	0.0	6.0
Terry Teagle	5	1	14.2	.333	.000	.786	0.4	0.2	0.6	0.2	5.0
Mychal Thompson	1	0	10.0	.000	.000	.000	0.0	0.0	0.0	0.0	0.0
James Worthy	4	4	41.0	.479	.167	.667	3.0	2.0	1.0	0.0	19.3

== Media coverage ==
This was the first Finals to be telecast in the United States by NBC. NBC Sports used Marv Albert on play-by-play and Mike Fratello as color analyst. Ahmad Rashad (for the Bulls) and Steve "Snapper" Jones (for the Lakers) served as sideline reporters.

This was the only NBA Finals series in which recently departed Lakers coach Pat Riley worked as a broadcaster; he was paired with Bob Costas in the pre-game, half-time and post-game presentations. Riley was then hired as head coach by the New York Knicks in the 1991 offseason and would eventually win another title with the Miami Heat in 2006.

In Chicago, this was Jim Durham's only Finals appearance as the Bulls' radio announcer (he also announced Bulls games on television via simulcast during the regular season and playoffs). He would later announce several NBA Finals games on ESPN Radio. Neil Funk succeeded Durham the following season and was the radio voice on five NBA Finals involving the Bulls (1992, 1993, 1996, 1997 and 1998). The simulcasts would also end after the season, with Wayne Larrivee (on WGN-TV) and Tom Dore (on cable) becoming the Bulls' television announcers the next season; by the 2008–09 NBA season Funk was calling television play-by-play on both networks while Chuck Swirsky called radio play-by-play. This was also the only NBA Finals to feature Johnny Kerr on color commentary, as he would become exclusive to television after the Finals.

== Aftermath ==
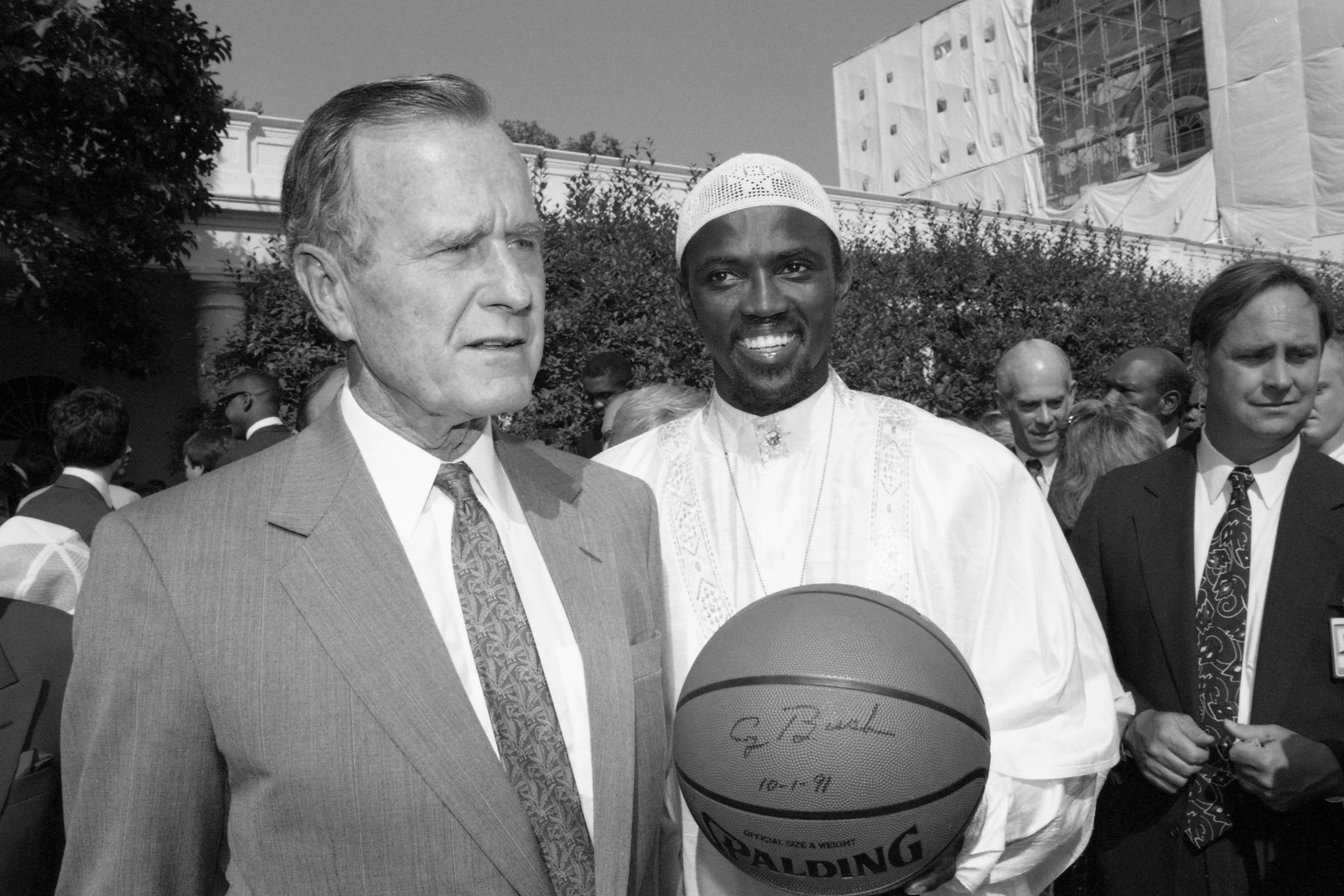
President George H. W. Bush welcomes members of the 1991 NBA Champion Chicago Bulls, including Craig Hodges, to the White House.

During the Bulls White House visit in 1991, guard Craig Hodges wore a dashiki and delivered a letter to President George H.W. Bush criticizing his administration's treatment of minorities and the poor. Hodges believed this act of activism, along with his outspokenness, led to him being blackballed from the NBA shortly after in 1992.

The Bulls’ victory in the 1991 Finals started a dynasty that lasted until 1998. They continued their dominance over the NBA the next year, as they knocked off the Portland Trail Blazers in six games to repeat as champions.

The Lakers' Showtime era would end on November 7, 1991, as Magic Johnson announced his retirement due contracting the HIV virus. He did, however, play in the 1992 NBA All-Star Game and eventually with the Dream Team in the 1992 Summer Olympics. The Lakers would decline in the years following Magic's retirement, being eliminated in the first round of the playoffs two straight years (1992 – 1993) before missing the playoffs entirely in 1994. The Lakers would eventually return to the Finals in 2000, knocking off the Reggie Miller-led Indiana Pacers in six games, which marked the start of a new dynasty for the franchise led by stars Shaquille O'Neal and Kobe Bryant.

Many of the Showtime era would stick around in the organizations after their playing careers were done. Magic Johnson coached the Lakers briefly in 1994 and ran the team as president of basketball operations from 2017 to 2019; Byron Scott coached many teams in the NBA, but coached the Lakers from 2014 to 2016; Larry Drew coached the team as an assistant from 1992 to 1999; James Worthy has been a studio analysts for the Lakers since 1998 over the various networks the team has been on over the years; and Mychal Thompson has been the radio color commentator for the team since 2003. Norm Nixon and Kurt Rambis, players not on the 1991 Finals team but recognizable from their Showtime era days, also took jobs in and around the organization. Nixon was studio color analyst for all Lakers home games for Fox Sports West for a number of years. Rambis had a short-lived stint as head coach in 1999, was an assistant coach throughout multiple stints over the next 15 years, and senior basketball adviser in the front office since 2018.

Phil Jackson would later coach to Lakers from 1999 to 2004 and 2005 to 2011 after the Bulls dynasty ran its course in 1998, leading the Lakers to five championships over the course of those two stints.

== See also ==
- 1991 NBA playoffs
- The Last Dance
