= 1990–91 Los Angeles Lakers season =

NBA professional basketball team season

- Conference champions
- Head coach: Mike Dunleavy Sr.
- General manager: Jerry West
- Owner: Jerry Buss
- Arena: Great Western Forum

Results
- Record: 58–24 (.707)
- Place: Division: 2nd (Pacific); Conference: 3rd (Western)
- Playoff finish: NBA Finals (lost to Bulls 1–4)
- Stats at Basketball Reference

Local media
- Television: KCAL; Prime Ticket
- Radio: KLAC

The 1990–91 Los Angeles Lakers season was the 43rd season for the Los Angeles Lakers in the National Basketball Association, and their 31st season in Los Angeles, California.

== Season summary ==
=== Off-season ===
During the off-season, the Lakers signed free agent Sam Perkins, and acquired Terry Teagle from the Golden State Warriors. After the resignation of Pat Riley, the team hired Mike Dunleavy as their new head coach, as the Lakers' offense would use more half-court sets, and the team would have a renewed emphasis on defense.

=== Regular season ===
Under Dunleavy, and with the addition of Perkins and Teagle, the Lakers struggled losing five of their first seven games of the regular season, but then posted an eight-game winning streak between November and December afterwards. After a 19–11 start to the season, the team posted a 16-game winning streak between January and February, and held a 35–11 record at the All-Star break. The Lakers posted two six-game winning streaks in March and April, and finished in second place in the Pacific Division with a 58–24 record, earning the third seed in the Western Conference. It was the first time since the 1980–81 season that the team did not win the Pacific Division title. The Lakers qualified for the NBA playoffs for the 15th consecutive year.

Magic Johnson averaged 19.4 points, 7.0 rebounds, 12.5 assists and 1.3 steals per game, and was named to the All-NBA First Team, while James Worthy led the Lakers in scoring averaging 21.4 points, 4.6 rebounds, 3.5 assists and 1.3 steals per game, and was named to the All-NBA Third Team. In addition, Byron Scott provided the team with 14.5 points per game, while Perkins contributed 13.5 points and 7.4 rebounds per game, and second-year center Vlade Divac provided with 11.2 points, 8.1 rebounds, 1.3 steals and 1.5 blocks per game. Off the bench, A.C. Green averaged 9.1 points and 6.3 rebounds per game, while Teagle contributed 9.9 points per game, and Mychal Thompson provided with 4.0 points and 3.2 rebounds per game.

During the NBA All-Star weekend at the Charlotte Coliseum in Charlotte, North Carolina, Johnson and Worthy were both selected for the 1991 NBA All-Star Game, as members of the Western Conference All-Star team. Johnson also finished in second place in Most Valuable Player voting, behind Michael Jordan of the Chicago Bulls. Johnson was the league's third-oldest point guard, and had grown more powerful and stronger than in his earlier years, but was also slower and less nimble.

The Lakers finished seventh in the NBA in home-game attendance, with an attendance of 682,024 at the Great Western Forum during the regular season.

=== NBA playoffs ===
In the Western Conference First Round of the 1991 NBA playoffs, and for the second consecutive year, the Lakers faced off against the 6th–seeded Houston Rockets, a team that featured All-Star center Hakeem Olajuwon, Otis Thorpe and Vernon Maxwell. The Lakers won the first two games over the Rockets at home at the Great Western Forum, before winning Game 3 on the road, 94–90 at The Summit to win the series in a three-game sweep.

In the Western Conference Semi-finals, the team faced off against the 7th–seeded Golden State Warriors, who were led by the Run TMC trio of All-Star forward Chris Mullin, All-Star guard Tim Hardaway, and Mitch Richmond. The Lakers won Game 1 over the Warriors at the Great Western Forum, 126–116, but then lost Game 2 at home by a score of 125–124, despite Johnson posting a double-double of 44 points and 12 rebounds. With the series tied at 1–1, the Lakers managed to win the next two games on the road at the Oakland-Alameda County Coliseum Arena, before winning Game 5 over the Warriors at the Great Western Forum in overtime, 124–119 to win the series in five games.

In the Western Conference Finals, the Lakers then faced off against the top–seeded, and Pacific Division champion Portland Trail Blazers, who were led by the All-Star trio of Clyde Drexler, Terry Porter and Kevin Duckworth. The Lakers took a 3–1 series lead over the Trail Blazers, before losing Game 5 on the road, 95–84 at the Memorial Coliseum. The Lakers won Game 6 over the Trail Blazers at the Great Western Forum, 91–90 to win the series in six games, and advance to the NBA Finals.

In the 1991 NBA Finals, the Lakers faced off against the top–seeded Bulls, who were led by the trio of Jordan, All-Star forward Scottie Pippen, and Horace Grant. The Lakers managed to win Game 1 over the Bulls on the road, 93–91 at the Chicago Stadium, but then lost Game 2 on the road by a score of 107–86, as the Bulls evened the series. The Lakers lost their next three home games at the Great Western Forum, including a Game 5 loss to the Bulls by a score of 108–101, thus losing the series in five games, as the Bulls won their first ever NBA championship in franchise history.

The Lakers would not return to the Finals again until 2000; this season is generally considered the final season of the team's successful, uptempo Showtime era.

=== Aftermath ===
Game 5 of the NBA Finals was the last Finals game played at the Great Western Forum; it was also Johnson's last NBA game before his retirement that November, due to his diagnosis with the HIV virus, although he would return to play in the 1992 NBA All-Star Game in Orlando, Florida, and with the Dream Team in the 1992 Summer Olympics in Barcelona, Spain. Johnson would make a brief return to the Lakers midway through the 1995–96 NBA season; after losing to the Houston Rockets in that year's playoffs, Johnson retired again and for good. Also following the season, Thompson retired.

== Draft picks ==
Round	Pick	Player	Position	Nationality	College
1	27	Elden Campbell	PF/C	United States	Clemson
2	51	Tony Smith	SG	United States	Marquette

== Roster ==
1990–91 Los Angeles Lakers roster
Players

Pos.	No.	Player	Height	Weight	DOB	From
F	41	Elden Campbell	6 ft 11 in (2.11 m)	215 lb (98 kg)	1968–07–23	Clemson
C	12	Vlade Divac	7 ft 1 in (2.16 m)	243 lb (110 kg)	1968–02–03	SFR Yugoslavia
G	10	Larry Drew	6 ft 1 in (1.85 m)	170 lb (77 kg)	1958–04–02	Missouri
F	45	A. C. Green	6 ft 9 in (2.06 m)	230 lb (104 kg)	1963–10–04	Oregon State
G	32	Magic Johnson	6 ft 9 in (2.06 m)	215 lb (98 kg)	1959–08–14	Michigan State
F	14	Sam Perkins	6 ft 9 in (2.06 m)	235 lb (107 kg)	1961–06–14	North Carolina
G	4	Byron Scott	6 ft 4 in (1.93 m)	195 lb (88 kg)	1961–03–28	Arizona State
G	34	Tony Smith	6 ft 3 in (1.91 m)	185 lb (84 kg)	1968–06–14	Marquette
G	20	Terry Teagle	6 ft 5 in (1.96 m)	195 lb (88 kg)	1960–04–10	Baylor
F	30	Irving Thomas	6 ft 8 in (2.03 m)	225 lb (102 kg)	1966–01–02	Florida State
C	43	Mychal Thompson	6 ft 10 in (2.08 m)	226 lb (103 kg)	1955–01–30	Minnesota
F	42	James Worthy	6 ft 9 in (2.06 m)	225 lb (102 kg)	1961–02–27	North Carolina

Coaches
Head coach
- Mike Dunleavy Sr.
Assistant(s)
- Bill Bertka
- Jim Eyen
- Randy Pfund

Legend
- (DP) Unsigned draft pick
- (FA) Free agent
- (S) Suspended
- Injured

Roster
Updated: December 6, 1990

== Regular season ==
- April 15, 1991 – Magic Johnson established the standard for most assists in a career with 9,888. The previous record holder was Oscar Robertson. For the season, Magic would establish a team record with 989 assists for the season. Magic would finish the season with a career total of 9,921.

=== Season standings ===
Pacific Division	W	L	PCT	GB	Home	Road	Div
y-Portland Trail Blazers	63	19	.768	—	36–5	27–14	18-10
x-Los Angeles Lakers	58	24	.707	5	33–8	25-16	19-9
x-Phoenix Suns	55	27	.671	8	32–9	23-18	17–11
x-Golden State Warriors	44	38	.537	19	30–11	14–27	13–15
x-Seattle SuperSonics	41	41	.500	22	28-13	13–28	12-16
Los Angeles Clippers	31	51	.378	32	23–18	8-33	10-18
Sacramento Kings	25	57	.305	38	24-17	1–40	9–19

y – clinched division title
x – clinched playoff spot

#	Western Conference				
#	Team	W	L	PCT	GB
1	z-Portland Trail Blazers	63	19	.768	–
2	y-San Antonio Spurs	55	27	.671	8
3	x-Los Angeles Lakers	58	24	.707	5
4	x-Phoenix Suns	55	27	.671	8
5	x-Utah Jazz	54	28	.659	9
6	x-Houston Rockets	52	30	.634	11
7	x-Golden State Warriors	44	38	.537	19
8	x-Seattle SuperSonics	41	41	.500	22
9	Orlando Magic	31	51	.378	32
10	Los Angeles Clippers	31	51	.378	32
11	Minnesota Timberwolves	29	53	.354	34
12	Dallas Mavericks	28	54	.341	35
13	Sacramento Kings	25	57	.305	38
14	Denver Nuggets	20	62	.244	43

z – clinched division title
y – clinched division title
x – clinched playoff spot

== Game log ==
=== Regular season ===
1990–91 game log
Total: 58–24 (home: 33–8; road: 25–16)
November: 7–5 (home: 5–3; road: 2–2)

Game	Date	Team	Score	High points	High rebounds	High assists	Location Attendance	Record
1	November 3	@ San Antonio	L 99-110	James Worthy (35)	Sam Perkins (10)	Magic Johnson (11)	HemisFair Arena; 15,908	0–1
2	November 6	Portland	L 123-125 (OT)	James Worthy (26)	Vlade Divac (13)	Magic Johnson (22)	Great Western Forum; 16,361	0–2
3	November 9	Sacramento	W 100-86	Magic Johnson (25)	Vlade Divac (16)	Magic Johnson (13)	Great Western Forum; 15,618	1–2
4	November 11	New York	L 103-109	Johnson & Scott (24)	Magic Johnson (15)	Magic Johnson (14)	Great Western Forum; 17,342	1–3
5	November 13	Phoenix	L 111-112	James Worthy (36)	Vlade Divac (10)	Magic Johnson (15)	Great Western Forum; 16,512	1–4
6	November 15	@ Houston	W 108-103 (OT)	Sam Perkins (29)	Magic Johnson (10)	Magic Johnson (16)	The Summit; 16,511	2–4
7	November 16	@ Dallas	L 86-99	Byron Scott (23)	Magic Johnson (8)	Magic Johnson (11)	Reunion Arena; 17,007	2–5
8	November 18	Golden State	W 115-93	Sam Perkins (22)	3 players tied (9)	Magic Johnson (10)	Great Western Forum; 15,644	3–5
9	November 19	@ Denver	W 122-105	James Worthy (25)	Vlade Divac (11)	Magic Johnson (11)	McNichols Sports Arena; 11,549	4–5
10	November 21	Denver	W 141-121	James Worthy (29)	Sam Perkins (13)	Magic Johnson (18)	Great Western Forum; 15,941	5-5
11	November 24	Orlando	W 115-89	James Worthy (22)	A.C. Green (17)	Magic Johnson (14)	Great Western Forum; 16,254	6–5
12	November 28	San Antonio	W 97-80	James Worthy (20)	James Worthy (11)	Magic Johnson (12)	Great Western Forum; 17,210	7–5

December: 10–4 (home: 5–1; road: 5–3)

Game	Date	Team	Score	High points	High rebounds	High assists	Location Attendance	Record
13	December 1	@ Phoenix	W 108-98	Byron Scott (32)	Magic Johnson (12)	Magic Johnson (15)	Arizona Veterans Memorial Coliseum; 14,487	8–5
14	December 4	Detroit	W 114-90	James Worthy (23)	Magic Johnson (12)	Magic Johnson (14)	Great Western Forum; 17,505	9–5
15	December 6	@ Minnesota	W 83-73	Magic Johnson (21)	Vlade Divac (12)	Magic Johnson (11)	Target Center; 19,006	10–5
16	December 7	@ Utah	L 79-101	Magic Johnson (20)	Johnson & Thompson (9)	Magic Johnson (9)	Salt Palace; 12,616	10–6
17	December 9	Washington	W 106-99	James Worthy (20)	Sam Perkins (14)	Magic Johnson (14)	Great Western Forum; 15,809	11–6
18	December 12	Dallas	L 97-112 (OT)	James Worthy (28)	Sam Perkins (11)	Magic Johnson (12)	Great Western Forum; 16,086	11–7
19	December 15	@ Golden State	W 111-109	Sam Perkins (30)	James Worthy (10)	Magic Johnson (9)	Oakland-Alameda County Coliseum Arena; 15,025	12–7
20	December 16	Indiana	W 115-112	Magic Johnson (29)	Vlade Divac (8)	Magic Johnson (21)	Great Western Forum; 15,795	13–7
21	December 18	@ New York	W 100-97	Magic Johnson (22)	3 players tied (6)	Magic Johnson (11)	Madison Square Garden; 19,081	14–7
22	December 19	@ Cleveland	L 74-84	Magic Johnson (18)	Sam Perkins (10)	Magic Johnson (15)	Richfield Coliseum; 19,183	14–8
23	December 21	@ Chicago	L 103-114	James Worthy (21)	Magic Johnson (9)	Magic Johnson (14)	Chicago Stadium; 18,676	14–9
24	December 23	Minnesota	W 118-94	James Worthy (24)	Vlade Divac (8)	Magic Johnson (13)	Great Western Forum; 17,506	15–9
25	December 26	@ L.A. Clippers	W 108-99	James Worthy (31)	A.C. Green (16)	Magic Johnson (13)	Los Angeles Memorial Sports Arena; 15,350	16–9
26	December 30	Philadelphia	W 115-107	Magic Johnson (34)	Magic Johnson (13)	Magic Johnson (13)	Great Western Forum; 17,505	17–9

January: 15–2 (home: 8–0; road: 7–2)

Game	Date	Team	Score	High points	High rebounds	High assists	Location Attendance	Record
27	January 3	@ Portland	W 108-104	James Worthy (30)	Sam Perkins (9)	Magic Johnson (17)	Memorial Coliseum; 12,884	18–9
28	January 4	@ Golden State	L 99-115	Byron Scott (22)	Vlade Divac (11)	Magic Johnson (13)	Oakland-Alameda County Coliseum Arena; 15,025	18–10
29	January 6	Golden State	W 135-108	James Worthy (29)	Vlade Divac (12)	Larry Drew (14)	Great Western Forum; 17,197	19–10
30	January 8	@ Seattle	L 88-96	James Worthy (21)	Divac & Green (6)	Larry Drew (6)	Seattle Center Coliseum; 14,441	19–11
31	January 9	Utah	W 108-85	Byron Scott (20)	Sam Perkins (10)	Magic Johnson (15)	Great Western Forum; 16,980	20–11
32	January 11	Cleveland	W 105-93	Magic Johnson (27)	Vlade Divac (11)	Magic Johnson (14)	Great Western Forum; 17,103	21–11
33	January 13	Houston	W 116-97	Vlade Divac (22)	Vlade Divac (11)	Magic Johnson (16)	Great Western Forum; 17,164	22–11
34	January 15	Charlotte	W 128-103	Terry Teagle (27)	Vlade Divac (12)	Magic Johnson (10)	Great Western Forum; 16,858	23–11
35	January 17	@ Sacramento	W 93-78	James Worthy (36)	3 players tied (9)	Magic Johnson (15)	ARCO Arena; 17,014	24–11
36	January 18	Seattle	W 105-96	Magic Johnson (33)	Vlade Divac (14)	Magic Johnson (9)	Great Western Forum; 17,505	25–11
37	January 21	@ Indiana	W 120-114	Magic Johnson (27)	Sam Perkins (12)	Magic Johnson (15)	Market Square Arena; 15,166	26–11
38	January 22	@ Orlando	W 116-96	Byron Scott (32)	Sam Perkins (9)	Magic Johnson (8)	Orlando Arena; 15,077	27–11
39	January 24	@ Charlotte	W 113-93	James Worthy (24)	Vlade Divac (9)	Magic Johnson (17)	Charlotte Coliseum; 23,901	28–11
40	January 25	@ New Jersey	W 108-103 (OT)	James Worthy (23)	Vlade Divac (11)	Magic Johnson (17)	Brendan Byrne Arena; 19,087	29–11
41	January 27	@ Boston	W 104-87	Magic Johnson (22)	3 players tied (9)	Magic Johnson (15)	Boston Garden; 14,890	30–11
42	January 29	New Jersey	W 110-89	A.C. Green (19)	Vlade Divac (11)	Magic Johnson (7)	Great Western Forum; 18,598	31–11
43	January 31	Atlanta	W 116-103	A.C. Green (20)	A.C. Green (11)	Magic Johnson (12)	Great Western Forum; 17,505	32–11

February: 9–4 (home: 4–1; road: 5–3)

Game	Date	Team	Score	High points	High rebounds	High assists	Location Attendance	Record
44	February 1	@ L.A. Clippers	W 106-92	Magic Johnson (30)	A.C. Green (12)	Magic Johnson (10)	Los Angeles Memorial Sports Arena; 15,350	33–11
45	February 3	Chicago	W 99-86	Byron Scott (18)	Vlade Divac (13)	Magic Johnson (11)	Great Western Forum; 17,505	34–11
46	February 5	L.A. Clippers	W 116-102	James Worthy (24)	Vlade Divac (11)	Magic Johnson (13)	Great Western Forum; 17,230	35–11
All-Star Break
47	February 12	@ Phoenix	L 95-99	Sam Perkins (26)	Divac & Green (9)	Magic Johnson (15)	Arizona Veterans Memorial Coliseum; 14,487	35–12
48	February 13	Minnesota	W 120-106	Terry Teagle (24)	Vlade Divac (13)	Magic Johnson (14)	Great Western Forum; 16,662	36–12
49	February 15	Boston	L 85-98	James Worthy (23)	Vlade Divac (11)	Magic Johnson (16)	Great Western Forum; 17,506	36–13
50	February 17	Portland	W 106-96	James Worthy (30)	Sam Perkins (12)	Magic Johnson (16)	Great Western Forum; 17,505	37–13
51	February 19	@ Houston	W 112-103	James Worthy (27)	Mychal Thompson (16)	Magic Johnson (17)	The Summit; 16,611	38–13
52	February 21	@ Dallas	W 106-92	Magic Johnson (21)	Magic Johnson (10)	Magic Johnson (12)	Reunion Arena; 17,007	39–13
53	February 22	@ Atlanta	L 102-111	Magic Johnson (24)	Magic Johnson (9)	Magic Johnson (9)	Omni Coliseum; 16,311	39–14
54	February 24	@ Detroit	W 102-96 (OT)	Magic Johnson (31)	A.C. Green (9)	Magic Johnson (11)	The Palace of Auburn Hills; 21,454	40–14
55	February 25	@ Philadelphia	L 90-92	Byron Scott (19)	Vlade Divac (16)	Magic Johnson (13)	The Spectrum; 18,168	40–15
56	February 28	@ Denver	W 121-108	Terry Teagle (23)	Vlade Divac (13)	Magic Johnson (14)	McNichols Sports Arena; 13,962	41–15

March: 10–6 (home: 6–3; road: 4–3)

Game	Date	Team	Score	High points	High rebounds	High assists	Location Attendance	Record
57	March 1	Orlando	W 115-101	Magic Johnson (26)	Vlade Divac (12)	Magic Johnson (9)	Great Western Forum; 17,326	42–15
58	March 3	Houston	L 95-104	Vlade Divac (23)	James Worthy (10)	Magic Johnson (8)	Great Western Forum; 17,505	42–16
59	March 5	@ Minnesota	L 85-94	Magic Johnson (32)	James Worthy (7)	Magic Johnson (9)	Target Center; 19,006	42–17
60	March 7	@ Milwaukee	L 94-99	James Worthy (26)	A.C. Green (9)	Magic Johnson (9)	Bradley Center; 18,633	42–18
61	March 9	@ Washington	W 87-72	Magic Johnson (25)	A.C. Green (11)	Magic Johnson (8)	Capital Centre; 18,758	43–18
62	March 10	@ Orlando	W 115-101	Sam Perkins (20)	Vlade Divac (15)	Magic Johnson (12)	Orlando Arena; 15,077	44–18
63	March 12	@ Miami	W 102-95	Johnson & Scott (21)	Magic Johnson (11)	Magic Johnson (14)	Miami Arena; 15,008	45–18
64	March 15	Denver	W 127-117	James Worthy (35)	Vlade Divac (9)	Johnson & Worthy (10)	Great Western Forum; 17,506	46–18
65	March 17	San Antonio	W 98-91	James Worthy (30)	James Worthy (9)	Magic Johnson (15)	Great Western Forum; 17,505	47–18
66	March 19	L.A. Clippers	W 119-105	James Worthy (26)	Vlade Divac (9)	Magic Johnson (11)	Great Western Forum; 17,303	48–18
67	March 20	@ Seattle	L 106-114	James Worthy (23)	Campbell & Perkins (5)	James Worthy (7)	Seattle Center Coliseum; 14,392	48–19
68	March 22	Milwaukee	L 92-99	James Worthy (34)	A.C. Green (10)	Larry Drew (7)	Great Western Forum; 17,505	48–20
69	March 24	Seattle	W 113-96	Magic Johnson (33)	Green & Perkins (9)	Magic Johnson (11)	Great Western Forum; 17,506	49–20
70	March 25	@ Sacramento	W 99-89	James Worthy (26)	Magic Johnson (12)	Magic Johnson (14)	ARCO Arena; 17,014	50–20
71	March 29	Portland	L 105-109 (OT)	James Worthy (26)	Magic Johnson (10)	Magic Johnson (12)	Great Western Forum; 17,505	50–21
72	March 31	Sacramento	W 115-87	Terry Teagle (35)	A.C. Green (10)	Magic Johnson (10)	Great Western Forum; 16,522	51–21

April: 7–3 (home: 5–0; road: 2–3)

Game	Date	Team	Score	High points	High rebounds	High assists	Location Attendance	Record
73	April 2	@ San Antonio	W 122-105	Magic Johnson (30)	Magic Johnson (12)	Magic Johnson (10)	HemisFair Arena; 15,908	52–21
74	April 4	@ Phoenix	W 102-98	James Worthy (26)	Sam Perkins (13)	Magic Johnson (14)	Arizona Veterans Memorial Coliseum; 14,487	53–21
75	April 5	Miami	W 108-87	Magic Johnson (20)	Sam Perkins (13)	Magic Johnson (9)	Great Western Forum; 17,505	54–21
76	April 7	Phoenix	W 93-85	Magic Johnson (31)	Sam Perkins (10)	Magic Johnson (8)	Great Western Forum; 17,505	55–21
77	April 11	Utah	W 110-95	Magic Johnson (31)	Vlade Divac (12)	Magic Johnson (11)	Great Western Forum; 17,505	56–21
78	April 13	@ Portland	L 113-118	Sam Perkins (32)	Sam Perkins (10)	Magic Johnson (15)	Memorial Coliseum; 12,884	56–22
79	April 15	Dallas	W 112-106	James Worthy (23)	Magic Johnson (9)	Magic Johnson (19)	Great Western Forum; 17,505	57–22
80	April 17	@ Golden State	L 111-118	Terry Teagle (21)	Green & Johnson (8)	Magic Johnson (15)	Oakland-Alameda County Coliseum Arena; 15,025	57–23
81	April 20	@ Utah	L 93-107	Vlade Divac (19)	Vlade Divac (17)	Magic Johnson (6)	Salt Palace; 12,616	57–24
82	April 21	Seattle	W 103-100	Terry Teagle (19)	A.C. Green (12)	Vlade Divac (6)	Great Western Forum; 17,505	58–24

1990–91 schedule

=== Playoffs ===
1991 playoff game log
Total: 12–7 (home: 7–4; road: 5–3)
First Round: 3–0 (home: 2–0; road: 1–0)

Game	Date	Team	Score	High points	High rebounds	High assists	Location Attendance	Series
1	April 25	Houston	W 94–92	Byron Scott (20)	Vlade Divac (11)	Magic Johnson (10)	Great Western Forum; 17,505	1–0
2	April 27	Houston	W 109–98	James Worthy (29)	Vlade Divac (10)	Magic Johnson (21)	Great Western Forum; 17,505	2–0
3	April 30	@ Houston	W 94–90	Magic Johnson (38)	Sam Perkins (13)	Magic Johnson (7)	The Summit; 16,611	3–0

Conference Semi-finals: 4–1 (home: 2–1; road: 2–0)

Game	Date	Team	Score	High points	High rebounds	High assists	Location Attendance	Series
1	May 5	Golden State	W 126–116	Byron Scott (27)	Magic Johnson (10)	Magic Johnson (17)	Great Western Forum; 17,505	1–0
2	May 8	Golden State	L 124–125	Magic Johnson (44)	Magic Johnson (12)	Magic Johnson (9)	Great Western Forum; 17,505	1–1
3	May 10	@ Golden State	W 115–112	James Worthy (36)	3 players tied (7)	Magic Johnson (15)	Oakland–Alameda County Coliseum Arena; 15,025	2–1
4	May 12	@ Golden State	W 123–107	Sam Perkins (27)	Byron Scott (11)	Magic Johnson (11)	Oakland–Alameda County Coliseum Arena; 15,025	3–1
5	May 14	Golden State	W 124–119 (OT)	Magic Johnson (28)	Sam Perkins (15)	Magic Johnson (12)	Great Western Forum; 17,505	4–1

Conference finals: 4–2 (home: 3–0; road: 1–2)

Game	Date	Team	Score	High points	High rebounds	High assists	Location Attendance	Series
1	May 18	@ Portland	W 111–106	James Worthy (28)	Sam Perkins (15)	Magic Johnson (21)	Memorial Coliseum; 12,884	1–0
2	May 21	@ Portland	L 98–109	James Worthy (21)	Sam Perkins (10)	Magic Johnson (12)	Memorial Coliseum; 12,884	1–1
3	May 24	Portland	W 106–92	James Worthy (25)	Green & Perkins (9)	Magic Johnson (19)	Great Western Forum; 17,505	2–1
4	May 26	Portland	W 116–95	Magic Johnson (22)	Magic Johnson (9)	Magic Johnson (9)	Great Western Forum; 17,505	3–1
5	May 28	@ Portland	L 84–95	Magic Johnson (29)	A.C. Green (9)	Magic Johnson (7)	Memorial Coliseum; 12,884	3–2
6	May 30	Portland	W 91–90	Sam Perkins (26)	Magic Johnson (11)	Magic Johnson (8)	Great Western Forum; 17,505	4–2

NBA Finals: 1–4 (home: 0–3; road: 1–1)

Game	Date	Team	Score	High points	High rebounds	High assists	Location Attendance	Series
1	June 2	@ Chicago	W 93–91	Perkins & Worthy (22)	Vlade Divac (14)	Magic Johnson (11)	Chicago Stadium; 18,676	1–0
2	June 5	@ Chicago	L 86–107	James Worthy (24)	Green & Johnson (7)	Magic Johnson (10)	Chicago Stadium; 18,676	1–1
3	June 7	Chicago	L 96–104 (OT)	Sam Perkins (25)	Sam Perkins (9)	Magic Johnson (10)	Great Western Forum; 17,506	1–2
4	June 9	Chicago	L 82–97	Vlade Divac (27)	Vlade Divac (11)	Magic Johnson (11)	Great Western Forum; 17,506	1–3
5	June 12	Chicago	L 101–108	Sam Perkins (22)	Magic Johnson (11)	Magic Johnson (20)	Great Western Forum; 17,506	1–4

1991 schedule

== Player statistics ==
Legend
GP	Games played	GS	Games started	MPG	Minutes per game
FG%	Field-goal percentage	3P%	3-point field-goal percentage	FT%	Free-throw percentage
RPG	Rebounds per game	APG	Assists per game	SPG	Steals per game
BPG	Blocks per game	PPG	Points per game

=== Regular season ===
Los Angeles Lakers statistics
Player	GP	GS	MPG	FG%	3P%	FT%	RPG	APG	SPG	BPG	PPG
Tony Brown^{†}	7	0	3.9	.667	1.000		.6	.4	.0	.0	.7
Elden Campbell	52	0	7.3	.455		.653	1.8	.2	.2	.7	2.8
Vlade Divac	82	81	28.2	.565	.357	.703	8.1	1.1	1.3	1.5	11.2
Larry Drew	48	2	10.3	.432	.424	.773	.7	2.5	.3	.0	2.9
A.C. Green	82	21	26.4	.476	.200	.738	6.3	.9	.7	.3	9.1
Magic Johnson	79	79	37.1	.477	.320	.906	7.0	12.5	1.3	.2	19.4
Sam Perkins	73	66	34.3	.495	.281	.821	7.4	1.5	.9	1.1	13.5
Byron Scott	82	82	32.1	.477	.324	.797	3.0	2.2	1.2	.3	14.5
Tony Smith	64	1	10.9	.441	.000	.702	1.1	2.1	.4	.2	3.7
Terry Teagle	82	0	18.3	.443	.000	.819	2.2	1.0	.4	.1	9.9
Irving Thomas	26	0	4.2	.340		.571	1.2	.4	.2	.0	1.8
Mychal Thompson	72	4	15.0	.496	.000	.705	3.2	.3	.3	.3	4.0
James Worthy	78	74	38.6	.492	.289	.797	4.6	3.5	1.3	.4	21.4

=== Playoffs ===
Los Angeles Lakers statistics
Player	GP	GS	MPG	FG%	3P%	FT%	RPG	APG	SPG	BPG	PPG
Elden Campbell	14	0	9.9	.658		.467	2.1	.2	.4	.6	4.1
Vlade Divac	19	19	32.1	.564	.167	.803	6.7	1.1	1.4	2.2	13.3
Larry Drew	18	0	6.4	.424	.273	.667	.4	1.2	.0	.0	1.9
A.C. Green	19	1	21.1	.423	.500	.704	5.4	.5	.6	.2	6.5
Magic Johnson	19	19	43.3	.440	.296	.882	8.1	12.6	1.2	.0	21.8
Sam Perkins	19	19	39.6	.548	.367	.761	8.3	1.7	.8	1.4	17.7
Byron Scott	18	18	37.7	.511	.526	.794	3.2	1.6	1.3	.2	13.2
Tony Smith	7	0	5.7	.462		.667	.4	.3	.1	.0	2.0
Terry Teagle	18	1	15.2	.376		.781	1.6	.6	.4	.2	6.6
Irving Thomas	3	0	1.7	1.000			.0	.0	.0	.0	.7
Mychal Thompson	8	0	5.3	.286			1.1	.0	.0	.4	.5
James Worthy	18	18	40.7	.465	.167	.736	4.1	3.9	1.1	.1	21.1

- ^{†} Denotes player spent time with another team in the season. Stats reflect time with the Lakers only.

Player statistics citation:

== Awards and records ==
- Magic Johnson, All-NBA First Team
- James Worthy, All-NBA Third Team
