= 1990–91 Portland Trail Blazers season =

NBA professional basketball team season

- Division champions
- Head coach: Rick Adelman
- President: Bucky Buckwalter (vice)
- General manager: Bucky Buckwalter
- Arena: Memorial Coliseum

Results
- Record: 63–19 (.768)
- Place: Division: 1st (Pacific); Conference: 1st (Western)
- Playoff finish: Conference finals (lost to Lakers 2–4)
- Stats at Basketball Reference

Local media
- Television: KOIN; Prime Sports Northwest
- Radio: KEX

The 1990–91 Portland Trail Blazers season was the 21st season for the Portland Trail Blazers in the National Basketball Association.

== Season summary ==
=== Off-season ===
During the off-season, the Trail Blazers acquired Danny Ainge from the Sacramento Kings.

=== Regular season ===
With the addition of Ainge, the Trail Blazers won their first eleven games of the regular season, posted an eight-game winning streak between November and December, and won five straight games in late December, which led to a franchise-best 27–3 start to the season. The team posted a seven-game winning streak in January, and later on held a 39–9 record at the All-Star break. At mid-season, the team traded second-year guard Dražen Petrović to the New Jersey Nets, and acquired former All-Star guard Walter Davis from the Denver Nuggets in a three-team trade. The Trail Blazers posted a 16-game winning streak between March and April, and finished in first place in the Pacific Division with a league-best 63–19 record, setting a franchise-high win total that still stands today, earning the first seed in the Western Conference. It was their first Division title since the 1977–78 season, and ended the Los Angeles Lakers' streak of nine consecutive years as Pacific Division champions, and number-one seed in the Western Conference. The team qualified for the NBA playoffs for the ninth consecutive year.

Clyde Drexler averaged 21.5 points, 6.7 rebounds, 6.0 assists and 1.8 steals per game, and was named to the All-NBA Second Team, while Terry Porter averaged 17.0 points, 8.0 assists and 2.0 steals per game, and led the Trail Blazers with 130 three-point field goals, and Kevin Duckworth provided the team with 15.8 points and 6.6 rebounds per game. In addition, Jerome Kersey contributed 14.8 points, 6.6 rebounds and 1.4 steals per game, while Buck Williams provided with 11.7 points and 9.4 rebounds per game, and was named to the NBA All-Defensive First Team. Off the bench, second-year forward Clifford Robinson averaged 11.7 points and 4.3 rebounds per game, while Ainge contributed 11.1 points and 3.6 assists per game, along with 102 three-point field goals, Mark Bryant averaged 5.1 points and 3.6 rebounds per game, and Danny Young contributed 3.8 points per game.

During the NBA All-Star weekend at the Charlotte Coliseum in Charlotte, North Carolina, Drexler, Porter and Duckworth were all selected for the 1991 NBA All-Star Game, as members of the Western Conference All-Star team, while head coach Rick Adelman was selected to coach the Western Conference; it was Porter's first ever All-Star appearance, and the second and final All-Star appearance for Duckworth. In addition, Drexler, Porter and Ainge all participated in the NBA Three-Point Shootout. Drexler finished in sixth place in Most Valuable Player voting, while Porter finished tied in ninth place; Williams finished tied in fifth place in Defensive Player of the Year voting, while Ainge finished in fifth place in Sixth Man of the Year voting, and Adelman finished in second place in Coach of the Year voting, behind Don Chaney of the Houston Rockets.

The Trail Blazers finished 20th in the NBA in home-game attendance, with an attendance of 528,244 at the Memorial Coliseum during the regular season.

=== NBA playoffs ===
In the Western Conference First Round of the 1991 NBA playoffs, the Trail Blazers faced off against the 8th–seeded Seattle SuperSonics, a team that featured All-Star guard Ricky Pierce, Eddie Johnson, and second-year star Shawn Kemp. The Trail Blazers won the first two games over the SuperSonics at home at the Memorial Coliseum, but then lost the next two games on the road, which included a Game 4 loss to the SuperSonics at the Seattle Center Coliseum, 101–89. With the series tied at 2–2, the Trail Blazers won Game 5 over the SuperSonics at the Memorial Coliseum, 119–107 to win in a hard-fought five-game series.

In the Western Conference Semi-finals, the team faced off against the 5th–seeded Utah Jazz, who were led by the trio of All-Star forward Karl Malone, All-Star guard John Stockton, and Jeff Malone. The Trail Blazers won the first two games at the Memorial Coliseum, before losing Game 3 to the Jazz on the road, 107–101 at the Salt Palace. The Trail Blazers won the next two games over the Jazz, including a Game 5 home win, 103–96 at the Memorial Coliseum to win the series in five games.

In the Western Conference Finals, the Trail Blazers then faced off against the 3rd–seeded Lakers, who were led by the trio of All-Star guard Magic Johnson, All-Star forward James Worthy, and Byron Scott. The Lakers took a 3–1 series lead, but the Trail Blazers managed to win Game 5 at the Memorial Coliseum, 95–84. However, the Trail Blazers lost Game 6 to the Lakers on the road, 91–90 at the Great Western Forum, thus losing the series in six games.

The Lakers would lose in five games to the Chicago Bulls in the 1991 NBA Finals.

=== Aftermath ===
Following the season, Davis was released to free agency, and re-signed with his former team, the Denver Nuggets.

== Draft picks ==
Round	Pick	Player	Position	Nationality	College
1	25	Alaa Abdelnaby	PF	Egypt	Duke

== Roster ==
1990–91 Portland Trail Blazers roster
Players

Pos.	No.	Player	Height	Weight	DOB	From
C	31	Alaa Abdelnaby	6 ft 10 in (2.08 m)	240 lb (109 kg)	1968–06–24	Duke
G	9	Danny Ainge	6 ft 4 in (1.93 m)	175 lb (79 kg)	1959–03–17	BYU
F	2	Mark Bryant	6 ft 9 in (2.06 m)	245 lb (111 kg)	1965–04–25	Seton Hall
C	42	Wayne Cooper	6 ft 10 in (2.08 m)	220 lb (100 kg)	1956–11–16	LSU New Orleans
G	6	Walter Davis	6 ft 6 in (1.98 m)	193 lb (88 kg)	1954–09–09	North Carolina
G	22	Clyde Drexler	6 ft 7 in (2.01 m)	210 lb (95 kg)	1962–06–22	Houston
C	00	Kevin Duckworth	7 ft 0 in (2.13 m)	275 lb (125 kg)	1964–04–01	Eastern Illinois
F	25	Jerome Kersey	6 ft 7 in (2.01 m)	215 lb (98 kg)	1962–06–26	Longwood
G	30	Terry Porter	6 ft 3 in (1.91 m)	195 lb (88 kg)	1963–04–08	UW–Stevens Point
F	3	Clifford R. Robinson	6 ft 10 in (2.08 m)	225 lb (102 kg)	1966–12–16	Connecticut
F	52	Buck Williams	6 ft 8 in (2.03 m)	215 lb (98 kg)	1960–03–08	Maryland
G	21	Danny Young	6 ft 3 in (1.91 m)	175 lb (79 kg)	1962–07–26	Wake Forest

Coaches
Head coach
- Rick Adelman
Assistant(s)
- Jack Schalow
- John Wetzel

Legend
- (DP) Unsigned draft pick
- (FA) Free agent
- (S) Suspended
- Injured

== Regular season ==
=== Season standings ===
Pacific Division	W	L	PCT	GB	Home	Road	Div
y-Portland Trail Blazers	63	19	.768	—	36–5	27–14	18-10
x-Los Angeles Lakers	58	24	.707	5	33–8	25-16	19-9
x-Phoenix Suns	55	27	.671	8	32–9	23-18	17–11
x-Golden State Warriors	44	38	.537	19	30–11	14–27	13–15
x-Seattle SuperSonics	41	41	.500	22	28-13	13–28	12-16
Los Angeles Clippers	31	51	.378	32	23–18	8-33	10-18
Sacramento Kings	25	57	.305	38	24-17	1–40	9–19

y – clinched division title
x – clinched playoff spot

#	Western Conference				
#	Team	W	L	PCT	GB
1	z-Portland Trail Blazers	63	19	.768	–
2	y-San Antonio Spurs	55	27	.671	8
3	x-Los Angeles Lakers	58	24	.707	5
4	x-Phoenix Suns	55	27	.671	8
5	x-Utah Jazz	54	28	.659	9
6	x-Houston Rockets	52	30	.634	11
7	x-Golden State Warriors	44	38	.537	19
8	x-Seattle SuperSonics	41	41	.500	22
9	Orlando Magic	31	51	.378	32
10	Los Angeles Clippers	31	51	.378	32
11	Minnesota Timberwolves	29	53	.354	34
12	Dallas Mavericks	28	54	.341	35
13	Sacramento Kings	25	57	.305	38
14	Denver Nuggets	20	62	.244	43

z – clinched division title
y – clinched division title
x – clinched playoff spot

== Playoffs ==
1991 playoff game log
First round

Game	Date	Team	Score	High points	High rebounds	High assists	Location Attendance	Series
1	April 26	Seattle	W 110–102	Clyde Drexler (39)	Kevin Duckworth (13)	Clyde Drexler (9)	Memorial Coliseum; 12,884	1–0
2	April 28	Seattle	W 115–106	Clyde Drexler (22)	Kevin Duckworth (10)	Clyde Drexler (10)	Memorial Coliseum; 12,884	2–0
3	April 30	@ Seattle	L 99–102	Clyde Drexler (23)	Buck Williams (11)	Clyde Drexler (11)	Seattle Center Coliseum; 14,476	2–1
4	May 2	@ Seattle	L 89–101	Jerome Kersey (20)	Williams, Robinson (9)	Jerome Kersey (5)	Seattle Center Coliseum; 13,367	2–2
5	May 4	Seattle	W 119–107	Terry Porter (23)	Buck Williams (12)	Terry Porter (11)	Memorial Coliseum; 12,884	3–2

Conference Semi-finals

Game	Date	Team	Score	High points	High rebounds	High assists	Location Attendance	Series
1	May 7	Utah	W 117–97	Clyde Drexler (20)	Clyde Drexler (15)	Terry Porter (9)	Memorial Coliseum; 12,884	1–0
2	May 9	Utah	W 118–116	Jerome Kersey (34)	Jerome Kersey (6)	Clyde Drexler (15)	Memorial Coliseum; 12,884	2–0
3	May 11	@ Utah	L 101–107	Terry Porter (28)	Drexler, Kersey (10)	Clyde Drexler (7)	Delta Center; 12,616	2–1
4	May 12	@ Utah	W 104–101	Kevin Duckworth (30)	Duckworth, Drexler (11)	Clyde Drexler (10)	Delta Center; 12,616	3–1
5	May 14	Utah	W 103–96	Drexler, Porter (22)	Buck Williams (12)	Clyde Drexler (8)	Memorial Coliseum; 12,884	4–1

Conference finals

Game	Date	Team	Score	High points	High rebounds	High assists	Location Attendance	Series
1	May 18	L.A. Lakers	L 106–111	Clyde Drexler (28)	Buck Williams (10)	Clyde Drexler (12)	Memorial Coliseum; 12,884	0–1
2	May 21	L.A. Lakers	W 109–98	Terry Porter (26)	Buck Williams (11)	Terry Porter (8)	Memorial Coliseum; 12,884	1–1
3	May 24	@ L.A. Lakers	L 92–106	Jerome Kersey (19)	Buck Williams (11)	Terry Porter (7)	Great Western Forum; 17,505	1–2
4	May 26	@ L.A. Lakers	L 95–116	Jerome Kersey (25)	Drexler, Williams (8)	Terry Porter (10)	Great Western Forum; 17,505	1–3
5	May 28	L.A. Lakers	W 95–84	Jerome Kersey (20)	Buck Williams (16)	Clyde Drexler (7)	Memorial Coliseum; 12,884	2–3
6	May 30	@ L.A. Lakers	L 90–91	Terry Porter (24)	Clyde Drexler (8)	Clyde Drexler (6)	Great Western Forum; 17,505	2–4

1991 schedule

== Player statistics ==
Legend
GP	Games played	GS	Games started	MPG	Minutes per game
FG%	Field-goal percentage	3P%	3-point field-goal percentage	FT%	Free-throw percentage
RPG	Rebounds per game	APG	Assists per game	SPG	Steals per game
BPG	Blocks per game	PPG	Points per game

=== Regular season ===
Player	GP	GS	MPG	FG%	3P%	FT%	RPG	APG	SPG	BPG	PPG
Clyde Drexler	82	82	34.8	.482	.319	.794	6.7	6.0	1.8	.7	21.5
Clifford Robinson	82	11	23.7	.463	.316	.653	4.3	1.8	1.0	.9	11.7
Terry Porter	81	81	32.9	.515	.415	.823	3.5	8.0	2.0	.1	17.0
Kevin Duckworth	81	81	31.0	.481	.000	.772	6.6	1.1	.4	.4	15.8
Buck Williams	80	80	32.3	.602		.705	9.4	1.2	.6	.6	11.7
Danny Ainge	80	0	21.4	.472	.406	.826	2.6	3.6	.8	.2	11.1
Danny Young	75	1	12.0	.380	.346	.911	1.0	1.9	.7	.1	3.8
Jerome Kersey	73	72	32.3	.478	.308	.709	6.6	3.1	1.4	1.0	14.8
Wayne Cooper	67	1	11.1	.393	.000	.786	2.8	.3	.1	.9	2.2
Mark Bryant	53	0	14.7	.488	.000	.733	3.6	.5	.3	.2	5.1
Alaa Abdelnaby	43	0	6.7	.474		.568	2.1	.3	.1	.3	3.1
Walter Davis^{†}	32	1	13.7	.446	.333	.913	1.8	1.3	.6	.0	6.1
Dražen Petrović^{†}	18	0	7.4	.451	.167	.682	1.0	1.1	.3	.0	4.4

=== Playoffs ===
Player	GP	GS	MPG	FG%	3P%	FT%	RPG	APG	SPG	BPG	PPG
Clyde Drexler	16	16	39.6	.476	.268	.776	8.1	8.1	2.1	1.0	21.7
Terry Porter	16	16	37.2	.500	.362	.861	2.8	6.6	1.5	.1	18.1
Jerome Kersey	16	16	36.8	.465		.752	6.9	3.1	1.8	.4	17.9
Buck Williams	16	16	35.8	.500		.603	8.9	.9	.6	.3	10.3
Kevin Duckworth	16	16	31.9	.401		.732	6.7	.9	.5	.5	11.7
Clifford Robinson	16	0	22.1	.538	.333	.551	3.9	1.1	.4	1.0	10.3
Danny Ainge	16	0	17.3	.448	.306	.821	1.8	1.9	.8	.3	8.0
Mark Bryant	14	0	9.8	.455		.875	2.3	.1	.1	.1	2.4
Walter Davis	13	0	8.5	.396	.000	.833	1.2	.5	.3	.0	3.3
Danny Young	7	0	5.1	.545	.000		.0	1.0	.0	.0	1.7
Alaa Abdelnaby	5	0	2.6	.333			.6	.0	.0	.0	.8
Wayne Cooper	3	0	4.3	.500			1.7	.3	.0	.0	.7

- ^{†} Denotes player spent time with another team in the season. Stats reflect time with the Trail Blazers only.

Player statistics citation:

== Awards and honors ==
- Clyde Drexler, NBA All-Star, All-NBA Second Team
- Buck Williams, NBA All-Defensive First Team
- Kevin Duckworth, NBA All-Star
- Terry Porter, NBA All-Star
