= Terry Porter =

American basketball player and coach (born 1963)

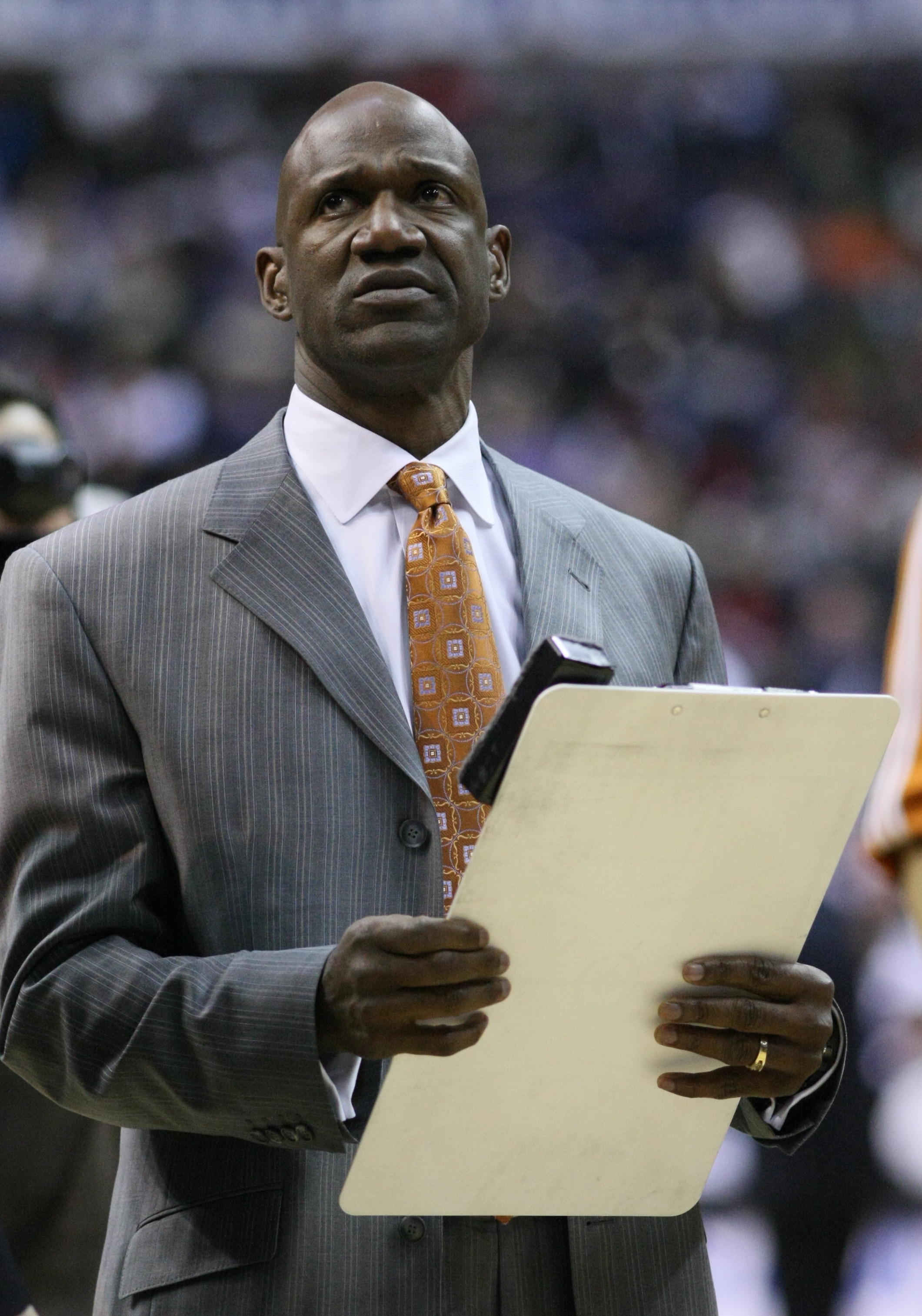
- Porter in 2009

Personal information
- Born: April 8, 1963 (age 63) Milwaukee, Wisconsin, U.S.
- Listed height: 6 ft 3 in (1.91 m)
- Listed weight: 205 lb (93 kg)

Career information
- High school: South Division (Milwaukee, Wisconsin)
- College: Wisconsin–Stevens Point (1981–1985)
- NBA draft: 1985: 1st round, 24th overall pick
- Drafted by: Portland Trail Blazers
- Playing career: 1985–2002
- Position: Point guard
- Number: 30
- Coaching career: 2002–2021

Career history

Playing
- 1985–1995: Portland Trail Blazers
- 1995–1998: Minnesota Timberwolves
- 1999: Miami Heat
- 1999–2002: San Antonio Spurs

Career highlights
- 2× NBA All-Star (1991, 1993); No. 30 retired by Portland Trail Blazers; 2× First-team NAIA All-American (1984, 1985); 2× WSUC Player of the Year (1984, 1985); 2× First team All-WSUC (1984, 1985); NAIA tournament MVP (1984)

Career NBA statistics
- Points: 15,586 (12.2 ppg)
- Rebounds: 3,872 (3.0 rpg)
- Assists: 7,160 (5.6 apg)
- Stats at NBA.com
- Stats at Basketball Reference

Terry Porter (born April 8, 1963) is an American former college basketball coach and former player in the National Basketball Association (NBA). He was most recently the head men's basketball coach at the University of Portland. A native of Wisconsin, he played college basketball at the University of Wisconsin–Stevens Point before being drafted 24th by the Portland Trail Blazers in the 1985 NBA draft. In Portland, he played ten seasons with two All-Star Game appearances. Porter spent 17 years in the NBA as a player. Following his retirement as a player in 2002, he began coaching in the league. Porter has twice been a head coach, first with his hometown Milwaukee Bucks and then with the Phoenix Suns.

== Early life ==
Porter was born in Milwaukee, Wisconsin, on April 8, 1963. Porter played prep basketball, as a forward, at Milwaukee's South Division High School.

== College career ==
Porter attended college at the University of Wisconsin–Stevens Point (the Pointers), at the time a National Association of Intercollegiate Athletics (NAIA) school. He played under head coach Dick Bennett, and with Brad Soderberg (who later became the head coach at Saint Louis University).

In four seasons at Stevens Point, Porter averaged 13.5 points, 3.8 rebounds and 3.8 assists per game, and shot 58.9 percent from the floor. As a junior, he averaged 18.8 points while shooting over 65 percent from the floor. Twice with the Pointers, as both a junior and a senior, he was named an NAIA First-Team All-American. As a junior, he was named the NAIA "Player of the Year", and in the 1984 NAIA tournament, he was named the tournament's Most Valuable Player even though the Pointers lost the national championship to Fort Hays State.

After the 1984 tournament, Porter was the only NAIA player to be invited to the 1984 U.S. Olympic Team trials—the team included Patrick Ewing, Michael Jordan, Sam Perkins, Wayman Tisdale, Chris Mullin, and Steve Alford—72 players were invited to the trials, led by head coach Bob Knight. At the trials he said: "I'm sure a lot of guys might have been surprised to see me here, I didn't even expect to get invited. This competition is a whole notch up from what I'm used to. I feel kind of in awe". Porter made it to the final 20 (even though he had the chicken pox), but on a team that was heavy on guards (Jordan, Alford, Vern Fleming, Alvin Robertson, and Leon Wood), Porter was cut on May 13, 1984, along with Charles Barkley and John Stockton.

After the Olympic trials, NBA scouts began to notice Porter for his "tight defensive play, nonstop hustle and deft shooting touch". He commented: "I wasn't much good in high school, so the big schools didn't come after me. But I guess I've improved a lot at Point". After three seasons at shooting guard, he moved to the point guard position.

Following his senior season, where he averaged 19.7 points and 4.3 assists per-game, Porter was the only Division III player named to the National Association of Basketball Coaches-Valvoline All-America Game. He was also the only NAIA player named to the Aloha Basketball All-Star Classic, where he was named to the all-tournament team (along with Detlef Schrempf, Harold Keeling, Xavier McDaniel, and Joe Dumars), and as "top defensive player" and co-MVP.

Porter returned to Wisconsin–Stevens Point to finish his degree in communications, obtained in 1993, with an emphasis in television and radio. He was awarded a Distinguished Alumnus Award in 1999.

== NBA playing career ==
=== Portland Trail Blazers ===
Going into the 1985 NBA draft, the Chicago Bulls, Atlanta Hawks, Golden State Warriors, and San Antonio Spurs, all looked to draft Porter. Most pundits, including Bob Ryan of the Boston Globe, projected him going to the Houston Rockets with the 19th pick in the draft, while Jan Hubbard of The Dallas Morning News had him going to the Detroit Pistons with the number 18 pick. He was considered the second-best choice at point guard, behind Sam Vincent of Michigan State.

On June 18, 1985, the Portland Trail Blazers selected Porter with the 24th overall pick in the NBA draft.

On February 5, 1987, Porter recorded his first career triple-double after recording 18 points, 10 rebounds and 13 assists in a 105–104 win over the visiting Los Angeles Lakers. A month later, Porter recorded his second career triple-double after recording 14 points, 11 rebounds and 10 assists in a losing effort against the Seattle SuperSonics.

During the 1987–88 season, Porter averaged 10.1 assists per game, making him the only player in the Trail Blazers' franchise history to average double-digit in assists in a season. Porter scored a career-high 40 points to go along with six rebounds and 12 assists in a 121–116 win over the Golden State Warriors on March 18, 1988. On April 14, Porter recorded 25 points and a career-high 19 assists in a 128–123 road win against the Utah Jazz.

On May 2, 1995, Porter recorded his 5,318 and 5,319 assist as a Portland Trail Blazers player. During the game, Trail Blazers' starter Rod Strickland recorded 10 assists in game 3 loss against Phoenix Suns.

During his decade-long tenure in Portland, Porter went to the NBA Finals twice, in 1990 and 1992. Porter played in the NBA All-Star Game in 1991 and 1993 and was the recipient of the J. Walter Kennedy Citizenship Award in 1993. As of 2010, Porter was the Trail Blazers' all-time assists leader, with 5,319.

=== Minnesota Timberwolves ===
Porter signed as a free agent with the Minnesota Timberwolves prior to the 1995–96 season and helped the Wolves clinch their first-ever playoff berth in 1996–97 and their first winning season the following year.

=== Miami Heat ===
He signed with the Miami Heat on January 22, 1999. On February 9, he scored a season-high 21 points to go along with three assists and three steals in a 108–101 home loss to the Boston Celtics.

=== San Antonio Spurs ===
Porter signed with the San Antonio Spurs prior to the 1999–2000 season. During the 2001 NBA playoffs, Porter, then 38 years old, played a key role in San Antonio's run to the Western Conference Finals, starting all 13 playoff games while averaging 8.3 points and 3.4 assists per game. He retired after the 2001–02 season.

== Career accomplishments ==
Porter's teams compiled a record of 815–547 (.598) during his playing career and only once failed to make the postseason.

In 1,274 career games, Porter averaged 12.2 points, 5.6 assists and 1.2 steals. He scored 15,586 career points. As of August 2021, Porter stands 17th on the NBA's all-time assists list (7,160). Porter has played for five of the top 36 coaches (games won) in NBA history: Pat Riley (1,210), Rick Adelman (945), Jack Ramsay (864), Gregg Popovich (797), and Flip Saunders (636).

On December 16, 2008, the Trail Blazers retired Porter's #30 jersey.

== Coaching career ==
=== NBA ===
Porter spent the 2002–03 season as an assistant coach with the Sacramento Kings, his first season in coaching.

On August 6, 2003, the Milwaukee native was hired as head coach of the Milwaukee Bucks. He was the eighth head coach in franchise history. He coached the Bucks for two years, leading a team which was expected to wind up in the playoffs after landing in the NBA draft lottery. However, the Bucks failed to make the playoffs the next season, and Porter was released during the 2005 offseason.

In his time away from the NBA, Porter coached his son's fifth-grade basketball team to an undefeated season. After a year away from the professional game, Porter joined the Detroit Pistons staff as an assistant coach for the 2006–07 season.

On June 9, 2008, Porter was named the 13th head coach of the Phoenix Suns, succeeding Mike D'Antoni.

On February 16, 2009, the Suns fired him after 51 games, and replaced him with assistant Alvin Gentry. The Suns had a 28–23 record, ninth in the Western Conference, with Porter.

On December 6, 2011, he was hired as an assistant coach by the Minnesota Timberwolves under Rick Adelman.

On January 8, 2013, the Timberwolves announced that Porter would be acting head coach while Adelman was not with the team due to family issues.

=== College ===
On April 2, 2016, it was announced that Porter was hired as the head men's basketball coach by the University of Portland. On February 5, 2021, the University of Portland fired Porter after he led the Pilots to a 43–103 record in nearly five seasons as head coach.

=== Executive ===
On September 28, 2025, Porter was hired to serve as a scout for the Portland Trail Blazers.

== Other ventures ==
In 2006, Porter led an investor group attempting to purchase the then-troubled Portland Trail Blazers from owner Paul Allen. After the 2006 draft, Allen appeared to renew his interest in the team and removed it from the market.

Porter joined the Trail Blazers television broadcasting team before the start of the 2010–11 NBA season.

In 2014, Porter was named as an alumni ambassador for Portland Trail Blazers.

== Personal life ==
Porter, the youngest of six children, is an avid golfer. He and his wife Susie have three children—Brianna, Franklin and Malcolm. The family resides in the Portland area. Throughout his career, Porter has been active with the Boys & Girls Club and is a member of the organization's Hall of Fame. In 1994, he created the Milwaukee Scholars Fund, which provides scholarships to minority students in Milwaukee to attend schools in the University of Wisconsin System.

== NBA career statistics ==
Legend
GP	Games played	GS	Games started	MPG	Minutes per game
FG%	Field goal percentage	3P%	3-point field goal percentage	FT%	Free throw percentage
RPG	Rebounds per game	APG	Assists per game	SPG	Steals per game
BPG	Blocks per game	PPG	Points per game	**Bold**	Career high
*	Led the league

=== Regular season ===
Year	Team	GP	GS	MPG	FG%	3P%	FT%	RPG	APG	SPG	BPG	PPG
1985–86	Portland	79	3	15.4	.474	.310	.806	1.5	2.5	1.0	.0	7.1
1986–87	Portland	80	80	33.9	.488	.217	.838	4.2	8.9	**2.0**	.1	13.1
1987–88	Portland	**82**	**82**	36.5	**.519**	.348	.846	**4.6**	**10.1**	1.8	**.2**	14.9
1988–89	Portland	81	81	**38.3**	.471	.361	.840	4.5	9.5	1.8	.1	17.7
1989–90	Portland	80	80	34.8	.462	.374	**.892**	3.4	9.1	1.9	.1	17.6
1990–91	Portland	81	81	32.9	.515	.415	.823	3.5	8.0	**2.0**	.1	17.0
1991–92	Portland	**82**	**82**	34.0	.461	.395	.856	3.1	5.8	1.5	.1	18.1
1992–93	Portland	81	81	35.6	.454	.414	.843	3.9	5.2	1.2	.1	**18.2**
1993–94	Portland	77	34	26.9	.416	.390	.872	2.8	5.2	1.0	**.2**	13.1
1994–95	Portland	35	9	22.0	.393	.386	.707	2.3	3.8	.9	.1	8.9
1995–96	Minnesota	**82**	40	25.3	.442	.314	.785	2.6	5.5	1.1	**.2**	9.4
1996–97	Minnesota	**82**	20	19.1	.416	.335	.765	2.1	3.6	.7	.1	6.9
1997–98	Minnesota	**82***	8	21.8	.449	.395	.856	2.0	3.3	.8	**.2**	9.5
1998–99	Miami	50*	1	27.3	.465	.411	.831	2.8	2.9	1.0	**.2**	10.5
1999–00	San Antonio	68	8	23.7	.447	**.435**	.806	2.8	3.3	.7	.1	9.4
2000–01	San Antonio	80	42	21.0	.448	.424	.793	2.5	3.1	.7	.1	7.2
2001–02	San Antonio	72	0	18.0	.424	.415	.819	2.3	2.8	.6	**.2**	5.5
Career		1,274	732	27.8	.463	.386	.836	3.0	5.6	1.2	.1	12.2
All-Star		2	0	17.0	.357	.143	—	1.5	3.5	1.5	.5	5.5

=== Playoffs ===
Year	Team	GP	GS	MPG	FG%	3P%	FT%	RPG	APG	SPG	BPG	PPG
1986	Portland	4	0	17.0	.444	.167	.500	1.3	3.0	.8	.5	6.8
1987	Portland	4	4	37.5	.480	.400	**.900**	4.8	**10.0**	**2.5**	.5	17.0
1988	Portland	4	4	37.3	**.558**	.333	.692	3.5	7.0	**2.5**	.0	17.0
1989	Portland	3	3	41.3	.500	.364	.833	**5.3**	8.3	.3	.3	**22.0**
1990	Portland	**21**	**21**	38.8	.464	.392	.842	2.9	7.4	1.3	.1	20.6
1991	Portland	16	16	37.2	.500	.362	.861	2.8	6.6	1.5	.1	18.1
1992	Portland	**21**	**21**	**41.4**	.516	**.474**	.832	4.6	6.7	1.0	.1	21.4
1993	Portland	4	4	38.0	.397	.158	.818	5.0	2.0	1.0	.0	16.5
1994	Portland	4	0	19.0	.343	.429	.786	3.0	2.3	1.0	.0	10.3
1995	Portland	3	0	7.0	.538	.400	.600	.7	1.3	.0	.0	6.3
1997	Minnesota	3	0	15.3	.385	.333	.750	1.0	3.0	.7	**.7**	5.3
1998	Minnesota	5	4	37.6	.429	.400	.833	5.0	3.2	1.0	.0	15.8
1999	Miami	5	0	27.8	.469	.250	.800	3.8	3.0	.6	.0	9.0
2000	San Antonio	4	0	22.3	.258	.286	.000	.3	1.3	1.5	.0	5.0
2001	San Antonio	13	13	25.1	.453	.333	.773	1.8	3.4	.8	.0	8.3
2002	San Antonio	10	0	13.1	.371	.294	.500	.9	.8	.4	.0	3.3
Career		124	90	31.8	.470	.372	.826	3.0	5.0	1.1	.1	14.7

== Head coaching record ==
=== NBA ===
Legend
Regular season	G	Games coached	W	Games won	L	Games lost	W–L %	Win–loss %
Playoffs	PG	Playoff games	PW	Playoff wins	PL	Playoff losses	PW–L %	Playoff win–loss %

Team	Year	G	W	L	W–L%	Finish	PG	PW	PL	PW–L%	Result
Milwaukee	2003–04	82	41	41	.500	4th in Central	5	1	4	.200	Lost in First Round
Milwaukee	2004–05	82	30	52	.366	5th in Central	—	—	—	—	Missed playoffs
Phoenix	2008–09	51	28	23	.549	(fired)	—	—	—	—	—
Career		215	99	116	.460		5	1	4	.200	

=== College ===
Record table
Season	Team	Overall	Conference	Standing	Postseason
Portland (West Coast Conference) (2016–2021)
2016–17	Portland	11–22	2–16	10th	
2017–18	Portland	10–22	4–14	9th	
2018–19	Portland	7–25	0–16	10th	
2019–20	Portland	9–23	1–15	10th	
2020–21	Portland	6–12	0–9		
Portland:		43–104 (.293)	7–70 (.091)		
Total:		43–104 (.293)			
National champion Postseason invitational champion Conference regular season champion Conference regular season and conference tournament champion Division regular season champion Division regular season and conference tournament champion Conference tournament champion

== See also ==
- List of National Basketball Association career games played leaders
- List of National Basketball Association career assists leaders
- List of National Basketball Association career steals leaders
- List of National Basketball Association career turnovers leaders
- List of National Basketball Association career playoff 3-point scoring leaders
