= Jim Eyen =

Personal information
- Born: March 16, 1956 (age 70) San Francisco County, California, U.S.

Career information
- College: UC Santa Barbara (1979)

Career history

Coaching
- 1979–1982: Santa Barbara CC (Assistant)
- 1982–1984: Dos Pueblos HS
- 1984–1988: UC Santa Barbara (Assistant)
- 1988–1989: Los Angeles Clippers (Assistant)
- 1989–1993: Los Angeles Lakers (Assistant)
- 1993–1996: Milwaukee Bucks (Assistant)
- 1997–2001: Portland Trail Blazers (Assistant)
- 2003–2009: Los Angeles Clippers (Assistant)
- 2009–2013: Sacramento Kings (Assistant)
- 2013–2015: Los Angeles Lakers (Assistant)

James P Eyen (born March 16, 1956) is a scout for the Minnesota Timberwolves of the National Basketball Association (NBA).

== Early career ==
Eyen graduated from the University of California Santa Barbara with a bachelor's degree in Communications Studies in 1979 and he earned a master's degree in education from Azusa Pacific University in 1984. He began his coaching career as an assistant coach at Santa Barbara City College in 1979 where he helped lead the Vaqueros to the state tournament three consecutive years. In 1982, Eyen was named head coach of Dos Pueblos High School in Goleta, Calif., and led his team to the 1984 CIF playoffs as well as coaching the county all-star team. From 1984 to 1988 Eyen served as an assistant for his alma mater, the University of California at Santa Barbara for four seasons, helping the Gauchos earn their first-ever trip to the NCAA Tournament.

== Coaching career ==
A 29-year veteran of the NBA, with 40 years of combined coaching or scouting/personnel experience. Eyen originally began his NBA career with the Los Angeles Clippers in 1988 when he served as an assistant coach under head coach Don Casey. The following season, he was hired by Pat Riley and the Los Angeles Lakers and was then retained when Mike Dunleavy was named head coach in 1990. After three seasons with the Lakers, Eyen followed Dunleavy to Milwaukee, where he remained through 1996. In 1997, Eyen again joined Dunleavy, only this time in Portland, where he worked as an assistant through 2001. When Dunleavy was named head coach of the Clippers prior to the 2003–04 season, he again asked Eyen to join him as the team's lead assistant. In 2009 Eyen was hired as lead assistant by Paul Westphal for the Sacramento Kings and was then retained by Keith Smart when he took over in 2012. In 2014 Eyen joined Byron Scott as a coach on the Los Angeles Lakers staff. In 2016 Eyen joined the Minnesota Timberwolves as a Collegiate personnel scout Eyen's NBA experiences include the 1990 NBA All-Star game, a trip to the NBA Finals with the Lakers in 1991, the McDonald's Open Championship in Paris, France also with the Lakers in 1991, and two trips to the Western Conference Finals in 1999 and 2000 with the Portland Trail Blazers. Eyen, a graduate of the University of California, Santa Barbara, began his coaching career in 1979 as an assistant coach to Frank Carbajal at Santa Barbara City College, where the Vaqueros participated in the post season three consecutive years and led the State in defense two of those three years. In 1982 he became head coach at Dos Pueblos High School in Goleta, Calif., led his team to the 1984 CIF playoffs and was named coach of the County All Star team. Before moving to the NBA in 1988, Eyen was an assistant to Jerry Pimm at his alma mater, UCSB, for four seasons—a span during which the Gauchos earned their first-ever trip to the NCAA tournament. In 2015 Eyen was inducted into the “Court of Champions” Hall of Fame in Santa Barbara, CA. Eyen's basketball interests extend internationally. He has served as a consultant to clubs in the Netherlands, Germany, and Japan, and in 1996, worked with the Japanese National Team. In 2007, he participated in the NBA's “Basketball Without Borders Europe” program in Paris, France. In 2015 in conjunction with the Chinese Basketball Association he conducted a youth coach's clinic in Wuhan, China. In collaboration with the NBA and the Chinese Ministry of Education he presented a coaching clinic in Shanghai, China in 2015.
