= 1990–91 Denver Nuggets season =

NBA professional basketball team season

- Head coach: Paul Westhead
- President: Bernie Bickerstaff
- General manager: Bernie Bickerstaff
- Arena: McNichols Sports Arena

Results
- Record: 20–62 (.244)
- Place: Division: 6th (Midwest); Conference: 13th (Western)
- Playoff finish: Did not qualify
- Stats at Basketball Reference

Local media
- Television: KWGN-TV; Prime Sports Rocky Mountain
- Radio: KOA

The 1990–91 Denver Nuggets season was the 15th season for the Denver Nuggets in the National Basketball Association, and their 24th season as a franchise. This was the first time since the 1978–79 season that Alex English was not on the opening day roster; it was also the first since the 1983–84 season that Fat Lever was not on the opening day roster.

== Season summary ==
=== Off-season ===
Former Seattle SuperSonics head coach Bernie Bickerstaff took over as the Nuggets' General Manager, and decided it was time to rebuild the team. At the time, the team had the oldest team in the league; the Nuggets made radical changes trading off stars for draft picks. The Nuggets acquired the third overall pick in the 1990 NBA draft from the Miami Heat via trade, and selected point guard Chris Jackson out of Louisiana State University; the team also selected small forward Marcus Liberty from the University of Illinois with the 42nd overall pick.

During the off-season, the team acquired Orlando Woolridge from the Los Angeles Lakers, signed free agent Joe Wolf, acquired rookie power forward, and first-round draft pick Terry Mills out of the University of Michigan from the Milwaukee Bucks, and acquired rookie power forward Anthony Cook out of the University of Arizona from the Detroit Pistons; Cook previously played overseas in Greece. The Nuggets also hired former Loyola Marymount University head coach Paul Westhead as their new coach.

=== Regular season ===
Westhead brought in his run-and-gun strategy known as "The System", which broke several offensive records at Loyola Marymount; he ordered his players to shoot the ball every six seconds after gaining possession. However, his plan backfired as the Nuggets struggled losing their first seven games of the regular season, and then later on posted an eight-game losing streak between December and January. The team managed to post a six-game winning streak between January and February, and held a 14–31 record at the All-Star break. At mid-season, the team signed free agent Reggie Williams, who was previously released by the San Antonio Spurs. In a three-team trade, the team traded Walter Davis to the Portland Trail Blazers, and traded Mills to the New Jersey Nets in exchange for Greg Anderson. The Nuggets posted two seven-game losing streaks in February and March, then posted a 10-game losing streak between March and April, and finished in last place in the Midwest Division with a league-worst 20–62 record. The team failed to qualify for the NBA playoffs for the first time since the 1980–81 season.

Michael Adams averaged 26.5 points, 10.0 assists and 2.2 steals per game, and led the Nuggets with 167 three-point field goals, but only shot .394 in field-goal percentage, and .296 in three-point field-goal percentage. In addition, Woolridge averaged 25.1 points and 6.8 rebounds per game, but only played 53 games due to a detached retina in his right eye, while Williams provided the team with 16.1 points, 4.8 rebounds and 1.8 steals per game in 51 games, and Jackson contributed 14.1 points and 3.1 assists per game, and was named to the NBA All-Rookie Second Team. Meanwhile, second-year guard Todd Lichti provided with 14.0 points and 1.6 steals per game, but only appeared in just 29 games due to an ankle injury, Blair Rasmussen averaged 12.5 points, 9.7 rebounds and 1.9 blocks per game, Jerome Lane provided with 7.5 points and 9.3 rebounds per game, Wolf averaged 7.3 points and 5.4 rebounds per game, Liberty contributed 6.7 points per game, and Cook provided with 5.3 points, 5.6 rebounds and 1.2 blocks per game. Adams finished tied in eighth place in Most Improved Player voting.

The Nuggets finished last in the NBA in home-game attendance, with an attendance of 438,103 at the McNichols Sports Arena during the regular season, which was 27th in the league. By season's end, the Nuggets led the league in scoring with 119.9 points per game, but also allowed 130.8 points per game for their opponents; as of 2026, this stands as an NBA record for the most points per game, and most total points allowed by a team during the regular season, according to StatMuse. The Nuggets allowed 100 or more points from their opponents in all 82 regular season games, allowed 130 or more points in 37 games, and allowed 150 or more points in nine games.

=== Notable highlights ===
Two notable games occurred during the regular season. In their season opener on November 2, 1990, the Nuggets lost to the Golden State Warriors at home, 162–158 at the McNichols Sports Arena; both teams combined for a total of 320 points, which broke a record for the highest scoring regulation game in NBA history.

Eight days later on November 10, the Nuggets lost to the Phoenix Suns on the road, 173–143 at the Arizona Veterans Memorial Coliseum. The Suns scored 57 points in the second quarter, held a 107–67 lead over the Nuggets at halftime, and shot .644 in field-goal percentage. The Suns' 173 points tied the 1959 Boston Celtics for the most points scored in a game that did not go into at least one overtime, and did not involve the winning team making a single three-point field goal in Phoenix's case; the Suns only attempted two three-point field goals that did not go in. In addition, the Suns' 57 points broke a record for the most points scored in a quarter, which was 52 by the 1965 Baltimore Bullets. As of 2026, the Suns record-high of 107 points in the first half remains the only game to have a team scoring over 100 points in a half.

However, the Nuggets also suffered a preseason loss to the Suns by a score of 186–123; the Suns' 186 points would have tied the scoring record the Detroit Pistons had back in 1983 against the Nuggets themselves had it counted as a regular season game. In addition, the Nuggets suffered exhibition games that had the Boston Celtics scoring 172 points (one point shy from their highest mark), and the Atlanta Hawks scoring 194 points (which would have broken the Pistons' scoring record against Denver back in 1983 had it counted as a regular season game, as well as became six points shy from breaking the 200 point barrier that would only be reached properly by the Eastern Conference All-Star team in the 2024 NBA All-Star Game) under blowout losses that Denver had during this time, which became precursors for what was to come for them during this season.

=== Aftermath ===
Following the season, Woolridge was traded to the Detroit Pistons after only one season with the Nuggets, while Adams was traded back to his former team, the Washington Bullets, and Rasmussen was dealt to the Atlanta Hawks.

== NBA draft ==
Round	Pick	Player	Position	Nationality	School/Club team
1	3	Chris Jackson	PG	United States	LSU
2	42	Marcus Liberty	SF	United States	Illinois

== Roster ==
1990–91 Denver Nuggets roster
Players

Pos.	No.	Player	Height	Weight	DOB	From
G	14	Michael Adams	5 ft 10 in (1.78 m)	162 lb (73 kg)	1963-01-19	Boston College
F	33	Cadillac Anderson	6 ft 10 in (2.08 m)	230 lb (104 kg)	1964-06-22	Houston
G	5	Kenny Battle	6 ft 6 in (1.98 m)	210 lb (95 kg)	1964-10-10	Illinois
F	00	Anthony Cook	6 ft 9 in (2.06 m)	205 lb (93 kg)	1967-03-19	Arizona
G	22	Jim Farmer	6 ft 4 in (1.93 m)	190 lb (86 kg)	1964-09-23	Alabama
G	3	Chris Jackson	6 ft 1 in (1.85 m)	162 lb (73 kg)	1969-03-09	LSU
F	35	Jerome Lane	6 ft 6 in (1.98 m)	230 lb (104 kg)	1966-12-04	Pittsburgh
F	30	Marcus Liberty	6 ft 8 in (2.03 m)	205 lb (93 kg)	1968-10-27	Illinois
G	21	Todd Lichti	6 ft 4 in (1.93 m)	205 lb (93 kg)	1967-01-08	Stanford
F	34	Anthony Mason	6 ft 7 in (2.01 m)	250 lb (113 kg)	1966-12-14	Tennessee State
C	41	Blair Rasmussen	7 ft 0 in (2.13 m)	250 lb (113 kg)	1962-11-13	Oregon
G/F	34	Reggie Williams	6 ft 7 in (2.01 m)	190 lb (86 kg)	1964-03-05	Georgetown
F	0	Orlando Woolridge	6 ft 9 in (2.06 m)	215 lb (98 kg)	1959-12-16	Notre Dame

Coaches
Head coach
- Paul Westhead
Assistant(s)
- Jim Boyle
- Mike Evans

Legend
- (DP) Unsigned draft pick
- (FA) Free agent
- (S) Suspended
- Injured

Roster
Updated: March 17, 1991

== Regular season ==
=== Season standings ===
Midwest Division	W	L	PCT	GB	Home	Road	Div
y-San Antonio Spurs	55	27	.671	—	33–8	22–19	20–8
x-Utah Jazz	54	28	.659	1	36–5	18–23	21-7
x-Houston Rockets	52	30	.634	3	31-10	21–20	20-8
Orlando Magic	31	51	.378	24	24-17	7–34	13–15
Minnesota Timberwolves	29	53	.354	26	21-20	8-33	9-19
Dallas Mavericks	28	54	.341	27	20-21	8–33	7-21
Denver Nuggets	20	62	.244	35	17-24	3-38	8–20

y - clinched division title
x - clinched playoff spot

#	Western Conference				
#	Team	W	L	PCT	GB
1	z-Portland Trail Blazers	63	19	.768	–
2	y-San Antonio Spurs	55	27	.671	8
3	x-Los Angeles Lakers	58	24	.707	5
4	x-Phoenix Suns	55	27	.671	8
5	x-Utah Jazz	54	28	.659	9
6	x-Houston Rockets	52	30	.634	11
7	x-Golden State Warriors	44	38	.537	19
8	x-Seattle SuperSonics	41	41	.500	22
9	Orlando Magic	31	51	.378	32
10	Los Angeles Clippers	31	51	.378	32
11	Minnesota Timberwolves	29	53	.354	34
12	Dallas Mavericks	28	54	.341	35
13	Sacramento Kings	25	57	.305	38
14	Denver Nuggets	20	62	.244	43

z - clinched division title
y - clinched division title
x - clinched playoff spot

== Player statistics ==
Legend
GP	Games played	GS	Games started	MPG	Minutes per game
FG%	Field-goal percentage	3P%	3-point field-goal percentage	FT%	Free-throw percentage
RPG	Rebounds per game	APG	Assists per game	SPG	Steals per game
BPG	Blocks per game	PPG	Points per game

=== Regular season ===
Player	GP	GS	MPG	FG%	3FG%	FT%	RPG	APG	SPG	BPG	PPG
Michael Adams	66	66	35.5	.394	.296	.879	3.9	10.5	2.2	0.1	26.5
Orlando Woolridge	53	50	34.4	.498	.000	.797	6.8	2.2	1.3	0.4	25.1
Walter Davis	39	13	26.8	.474	.303	.915	3.2	2.2	1.6	0.1	18.7
Reggie Williams	51	46	30.2	.444	.328	.840	4.8	1.7	1.8	0.6	16.1
Mahmoud Abdul-Rauf	67	19	22.5	.413	.240	.857	1.8	3.1	0.8	0.1	14.1
Todd Lichti	29	25	29.7	.439	.298	.855	3.9	2.5	1.6	0.3	14.0
Blair Rasmussen	70	69	33.2	.458	.400	.677	9.7	1.0	0.7	1.9	12.5
Jim Farmer	25	1	17.7	.458	.227	.730	2.5	1.5	0.5	0.1	10.0
Corey Gaines	10	2	22.6	.400	.238	.846	1.4	9.1	1.0	0.2	8.3
Jerome Lane	62	25	22.3	.438	.250	.411	9.3	2.0	0.8	0.2	7.5
Terry Mills	17	0	16.4	.467	.000	.727	5.2	0.9	0.9	0.5	7.5
Joe Wolf	74	38	21.5	.451	.133	.831	5.4	1.4	0.8	0.4	7.3
Marcus Liberty	76	18	15.4	.421	.298	.630	2.9	0.8	0.6	0.3	6.7
Kenny Battle	40	4	17.1	.485	.136	.781	3.1	1.2	1.0	0.3	6.1
Tim Legler	10	0	14.8	.347	.250	.833	1.8	1.2	0.2	0.0	5.8
Anthony Cook	58	25	19.3	.417	.000	.550	5.6	0.4	0.6	1.2	5.3
Greg Anderson	41	2	16.1	.440		.506	5.8	0.3	0.6	0.9	5.2
Craig Neal	10	0	12.5	.400	.333	.591	1.6	3.7	0.4	0.0	4.4
Avery Johnson	21	4	10.3	.426	.000	.656	1.0	3.7	0.7	0.1	3.8
Anthony Mason	3	0	7.0	.500		.750	1.7	0.0	0.3	0.0	3.3
T.R. Dunn	17	3	12.8	.447	.250	.900	2.5	1.4	0.7	0.1	3.1

Player statistics citation:

== Awards and records ==
- Mahmoud Abdul-Rauf, NBA All-Rookie Team 2nd Team
