= Byron Scott =

American basketball player and coach (born 1961)

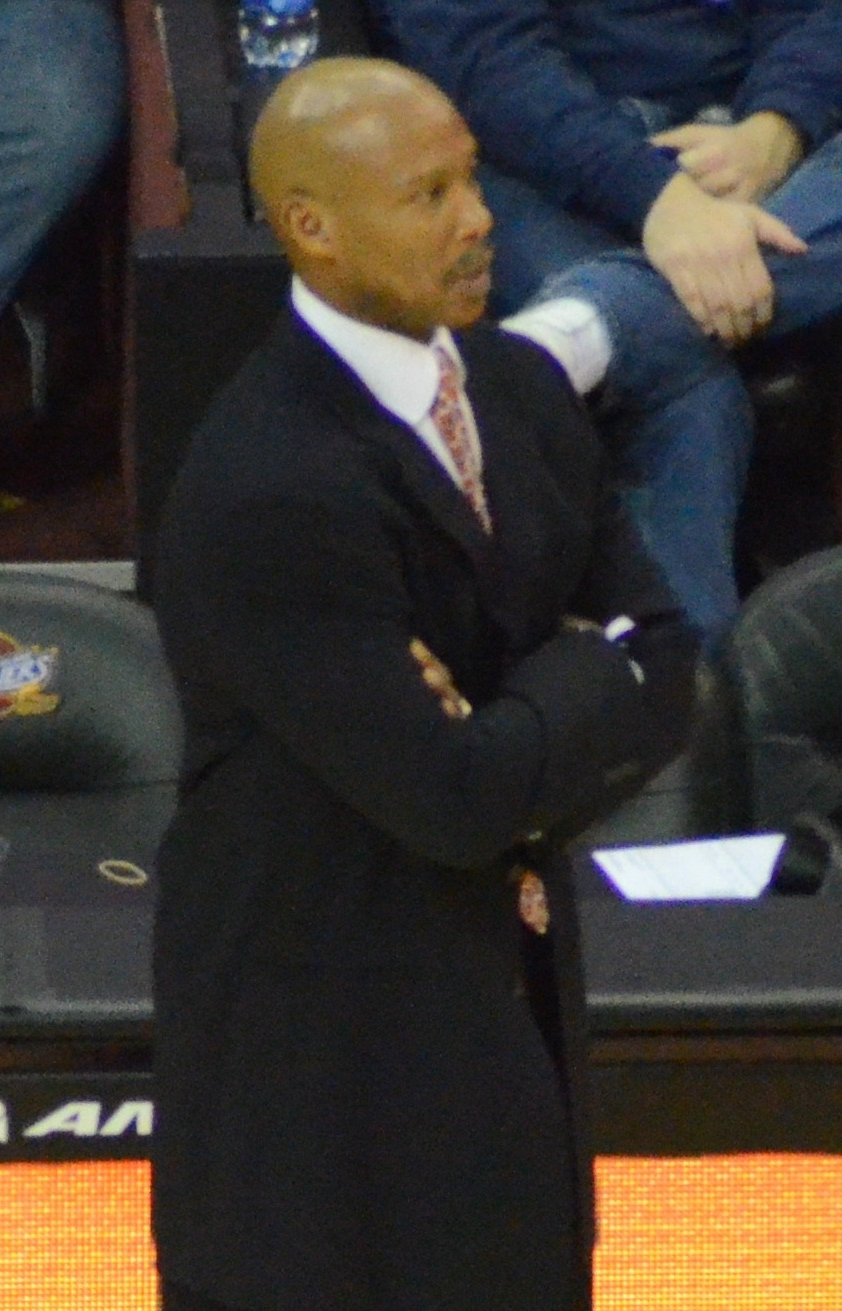
- Scott in 2012

Personal information
- Born: March 28, 1961 (age 65) Ogden, Utah, U.S.
- Listed height: 6 ft 4 in (1.93 m)
- Listed weight: 205 lb (93 kg)

Career information
- High school: Morningside (Inglewood, California)
- College: Arizona State (1979–1983)
- NBA draft: 1983: 1st round, 4th overall pick
- Drafted by: San Diego Clippers
- Playing career: 1983–1998
- Position: Shooting guard
- Number: 4, 00, 11
- Coaching career: 1998–2016

Career history

Playing
- 1983–1993: Los Angeles Lakers
- 1993–1995: Indiana Pacers
- 1995–1996: Vancouver Grizzlies
- 1996–1997: Los Angeles Lakers
- 1997–1998: Panathinaikos

Coaching
- 1998–2000: Sacramento Kings (assistant)
- 2000–2004: New Jersey Nets
- 2004–2009: New Orleans Hornets (Note: During the 2005–06 and 2006–07 seasons, the team was known as the New Orleans/Oklahoma City Hornets during their temporary relocation to Oklahoma City due to Hurricane Katrina.)
- 2010–2013: Cleveland Cavaliers
- 2014–2016: Los Angeles Lakers

Career highlights
- As player: 3× NBA champion (1985, 1987, 1988); NBA All-Rookie First Team (1984); FIBA EuroStar (1997); Greek Basket League champion (1998); Greek League All-Star (1997); First-team All-Pac-10 (1983); Pac-10 Freshman of the Year (1980); No. 11 jersey retired by Arizona State Sun Devils; Fourth-team Parade All-American (1979); McDonald's All-American (1979); As coach: NBA Coach of the Year (2008); 2× NBA All-Star Game head coach (2002, 2008)

Career NBA statistics
- Points: 15,097 (14.1 ppg)
- Rebounds: 2,987 (2.8 rpg)
- Assists: 2,729 (2.5 apg)
- Stats at NBA.com
- Stats at Basketball Reference

Byron Antom Scott (born March 28, 1961) is an American former professional basketball player and coach in the National Basketball Association (NBA). As a role player, Scott won three NBA championships with the Los Angeles Lakers during their Showtime era in the 1980s. He was named the NBA Coach of the Year with the New Orleans Hornets (now Pelicans) in 2008.

== Early life and college career ==
Scott grew up in Inglewood, California, and played at Morningside High School, in the shadow of what was then the Lakers' home arena, The Forum. He played college basketball at Arizona State University for three years and had a successful career with the Sun Devils. He was Pac-10 Freshman of the Year in 1980 and First-team All-Pac-10 in 1983. He averaged 17.5 points per game in his career for the Sun Devils. He left after his junior year, entering the 1983 NBA draft. In 2011, his No. 11 was retired by the Arizona State Sun Devils.

== Professional career ==
=== NBA ===
Selected by the San Diego Clippers in the first round, with the fourth pick of the 1983 NBA draft, Scott was traded to the Los Angeles Lakers in 1983 in exchange for Norm Nixon. During his playing career, Scott suited up for the Lakers, Indiana Pacers and Vancouver Grizzlies. Scott was a key player for the Lakers during the Showtime era, being a starter alongside Magic Johnson, James Worthy, Kareem Abdul-Jabbar and A.C. Green. He played for the Lakers for 10 consecutive seasons (1983–1993). During that time he was on three NBA championship teams (1985, 1987, 1988). As a rookie, Scott was a member of the 1984 all-rookie team, averaging 10.6 PPG in 22 MPG. He led the NBA in three-point field goal percentage (.433) in 1984–85. In 1987–88, Scott enjoyed his best season, leading the NBA champion Lakers in scoring, averaging a career-best 21.7 ppg, and in steals (1.91 spg). He was the Lakers' starting shooting guard from 1984 until 1993.

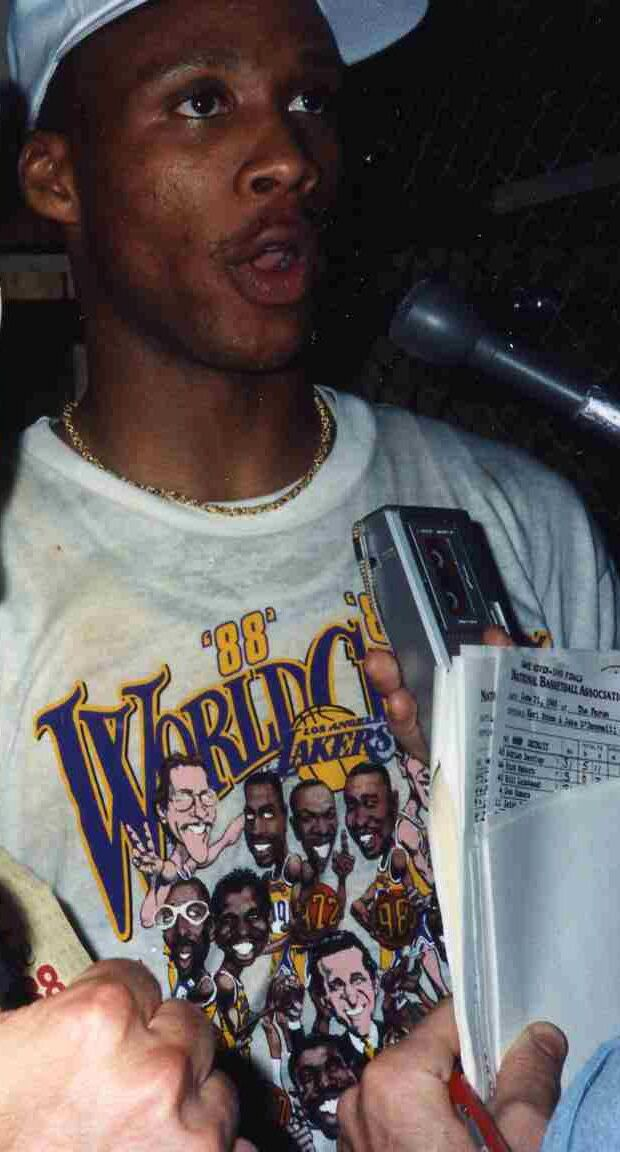
Scott speaks with the media after winning the 1988 NBA Finals.

Scott was released by the Lakers after the 1992–93 season and signed a free-agent contract with the Pacers. In Game 1 of the Pacers' first-round playoff matchup against the Orlando Magic, Scott hit the game-winning three-point shot with 2.4 seconds left. The Pacers would go on to sweep the Magic and eventually advance to the Eastern Conference finals for the first time in franchise history.

Scott was left unprotected by the Pacers in the 1995 NBA expansion draft and was selected by the Vancouver Grizzlies, where he played one season.

In 1996–97, the last year of Scott's playing career in the NBA, he went back to the Lakers and proved to be a valuable mentor for a team featuring Shaquille O'Neal, Eddie Jones, Nick Van Exel and 18-year-old rookie Kobe Bryant (Scott would be Bryant's coach on the Lakers towards the end of the latter's career).

The Lakers made it to the playoffs in the 1996–97 season with a 56–26 record and reached the semi-finals against the Utah Jazz. Game 4 of this series was Scott's last game of his NBA career. In that game, Scott played for 15 and half minutes and recorded 4 points and 5 assists. The Lakers unfortunately lost the game 95–110 to drop to 3–1 in the series. Scott would sit out for Game 5 as the Lakers lost 93–98 and were eliminated from the playoffs.

=== Panathinaikos ===
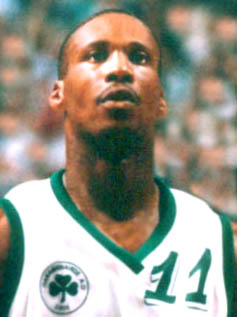
Scott with Panathinaikos in 1998

In the summer of 1997, Scott signed a two-year contract of nearly $2 million with the Greek Basket League team Panathinaikos. In the 1997–98 season, he played with Panathinaikos in both the FIBA Saporta Cup (known then as the FIBA EuroCup), Europe's second-tier level competition after the top-tier EuroLeague, and the Greek Basket League. In the Saporta Cup's 1997–98 season, he averaged 13.4 points, 2.4 rebounds, 2.1 assists, and 1.1 steals, in 25.6 minutes per game, in 17 games played.

Scott helped his team win the Greek Basket League championship after 13 years, being pivotal in many crucial games. In the Greek Basket League's 1997–98 season, he averaged 17.6 points, 2.8 rebounds, 2.3 assists, and 1.3 steals per game, in 33.7 minutes per game, in 34 games played. After one season with the Greek Basket League champions, Scott retired from playing professional basketball, and began his coaching career.

== Coaching career ==
=== Sacramento Kings ===
Scott began his NBA coaching career in 1998 as an assistant with the Sacramento Kings under Rick Adelman. He served as an advance scout that looked at game plans on offense alongside work in the perimeter.

=== New Jersey Nets ===
On June 27, 2000, Scott was hired to coach the New Jersey Nets after being offered the job the previous day by general manager Rod Thorn. He was hired to replace Don Casey, who had been fired on April 26 after coaching the team since March 1999. Scott was considered for the Indiana Pacers job prior to reaching with Thorn, who himself had been hired recently to try and turn over a team that had missed the playoffs in five of the past six seasons while having had twelve head coaches in 23 seasons as an NBA franchise; the day that Scott was hired was right before the 2000 NBA draft, for which the Nets had the first overall pick.

His team performed poorly in his first year, winning just 26 games with new draft pick Kenyon Martin. Stephen Jackson made an impression as a first-year player having come from the CBA and foreign leagues that year but was not retained. Years later, Jackson called Scott the "worst communicator for young guys". However, the team would improve in dividends in the 2001–02 season with the arrival of Jason Kidd in a trade that sent Stephon Marbury to the Phoenix Suns. Kidd and the Nets won 52 games, a franchise record. In the process, they won their first Atlantic Division crown and were the number one seed. In the first round against the Indiana Pacers, the Nets had to play the full five games to narrowly avoid an upset, which saw them go on a 13-2 barrage in the second overtime to win their first playoff series since 1984. In the semifinals against Charlotte, they dispatched them in five games to advance to their first Conference Finals as an NBA team and first overall semifinal since the ABA era in 1976. They faced the Boston Celtics in the Conference Finals and split the first four games, which notably saw them blow a 26-point lead in Game 3. The Nets rallied with decisive victories in Game 5 and 6 to win the series. They appeared in their first NBA Finals against the Los Angeles Lakers, who were headlined by Shaquille O'Neal and Kobe Bryant in their third straight NBA Finals appearance. In Game 1, Kidd had the first triple-double in an NBA Finals since 1993, but the Lakers led by a score of 42–19 only six minutes into the second quarter and never looked back in a 99–94 win. In Game 2, the Nets were down six by the first quarter being over and never cut into the lead after that on the road to a 23-point loss. Game 3 was the only tight game that saw the Nets lead until Robert Horry made a three-point shot with 3:04 to go that gave the Lakers a go-ahead lead they never lost. The Nets lost Game 4 by a score of 113–107 as the Lakers won their third straight championship.

The following campaign saw them regress to 49 wins, marred by injuries to newly acquired Dikembe Mutombo that saw Kidd as their lone All-Star. They were 34–15 at the All-Star break, but they played below .500 the rest of the year to wind up with 49 wins, which was one short of the Detroit Pistons for the number one seed in the East. In the First Round against the Milwaukee Bucks, they split the first four games before eventually pulling out a series win in Game 6. They did not lose again for the next two rounds, dispatching Boston in the Semifinals and the Pistons in a straight sweep to win their second straight conference championship. They were matched in the NBA Finals to face the 60-win San Antonio Spurs, headlined by two-time league MVP Tim Duncan, a retiring David Robinson, and future stars Manu Ginobili and Tony Parker. The two teams split the first four games. The Spurs won Game 1 after a 32-17 third quarter to ultimately win by 12, but New Jersey won Game 2 after a ten-point fourth quarter lead nearly turned into a loss before a missed three point shot with seconds remaining meant the Nets held on to win 87–85. In Game 3, the Spurs trailed by three before the fourth quarter started but took the lead with eight minutes remaining and never relinquished it. Game 4 saw the Nets lead by eleven points in a tight defensive affair that saw both teams score under 80 points for the only time in the series. The Spurs were up by one in the fourth quarter after a busy third quarter, but Kidd made four free throws in the final nine seconds as the Nets won 77–76 to tie the series. In Game 5, the Spurs took control early and led for a majority of the game, and after making a shot in the third quarter with three minutes remaining to take the lead back, they never looked back in a 93–83 win. Game 6 saw the Nets on the brink of elimination. The Nets took the lead on the first points and even had a 10-point barrage at one point, but they were only up three points at halftime. By the end of the third, they were up 63-57 and had not trailed once. The Nets led 72–63 with 8:55 left to play in the fourth quarter. However, the Nets went cold in an instant, losing the lead through the help of Duncan and newly acquired Stephen Jackson to score ten points in the span of two minutes. The Nets scored just five points in the last 8:55 of the game while the Spurs ended up with 25 in that same span as the Nets allowed 19 unanswered points, complete with Duncan nearly having a quadruple-double (21 points, 20 rebounds, 10 assists, 8 blocks) while a retiring Robinson had 13 points and 17 rebounds. The Nets scored 492 total points in the series, the second lowest for a six-game series while shooting 34.5%. Kidd was quoted as saying that the team lost their composure and "unraveled".

By July 2003, tension was apparent with the Nets, who were being dogged by reports that Kidd asked that Scott to be fired in order for him to agree to re-sign to a six-year contract. Scott himself admitted that his stubborn qualities with Kidd requires him to need to try to be more of a "taskmaster" in being more hands on, particularly with the departure of assistant coach Eddie Jordan, who had left for the Washington Wizards after having done his share of calling plays. Scott was approaching the 2003–04 season as the last one of his contract while being dogged by articles that had anonymous sources criticizing his coaching in the 2003 NBA Finals.

Scott was fired during the 2003–04 season, as New Jersey had a disappointing 22–20 record coming into the All-Star break, even though they were leading their division at the time of his dismissal. Rumors of a rift between Scott and Kidd circulated media outlets, with sources allegedly claiming that Kidd wanted Scott out of Jersey. All the parties, including Rod Thorn, denied the reports. Scott claimed that he was "very surprised" by the report and that he and Kidd "always got along". Kidd stated later that "Sometimes change or a different voice is good."

He was succeeded by his assistant Lawrence Frank. While coaching the Nets, Scott lived in Livingston, New Jersey.

=== New Orleans Hornets ===
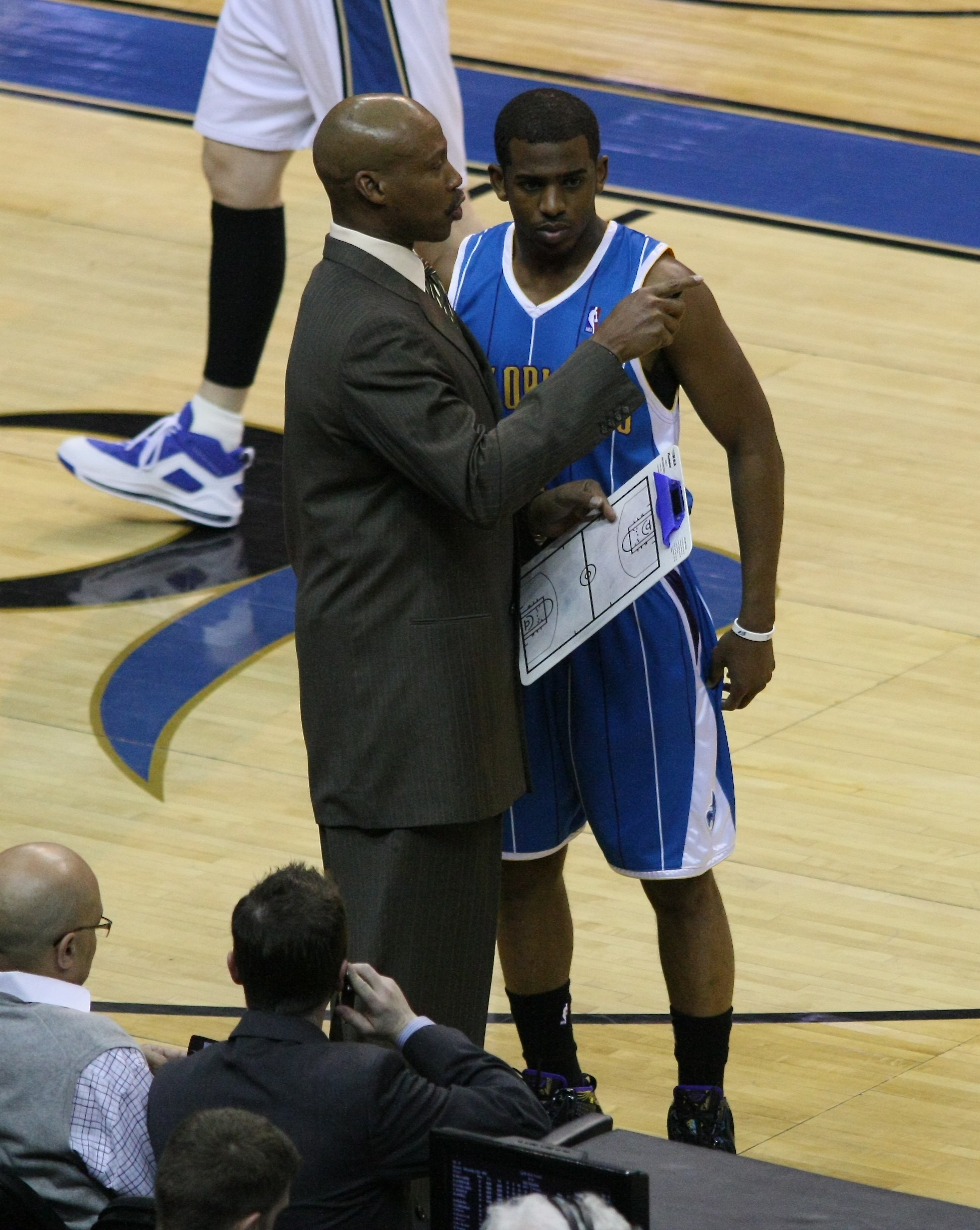
Byron Scott talks to Chris Paul in a 2009 game; Scott was head coach of the New Orleans Hornets from 2004 to 2009.

Scott became the head coach of the New Orleans Hornets in 2004. Chris Paul was drafted by the team in 2005, and was named Rookie of the Year. In the 2005–06 and 2006–07 seasons, he guided the team to a pair of sub .500 seasons. One obstacle was that the team played most of its home games in Oklahoma City due to Hurricane Katrina's devastation of New Orleans.

In the 2007–08 season, Scott had his first winning season as the Hornets head coach. They had a winning percentage of .683 with a record of 56–26. They became Southwest Division champions and finished 2nd overall in the Western Conference. He was named the head coach of the 2008 Western Conference All-Star team, and a few months after, he was awarded the 2007–08 NBA Coach of the Year Award. Due to his success, the Hornets awarded Scott with a two-year extension.

The Hornets had a 30–11 home record and a 26–15 road record and clinched the second seed in the Western Conference Playoffs. The Hornets won their first-round series against the Dallas Mavericks, posting a 4–1 record for the series. They would go on to face the defending champion San Antonio Spurs in the conference semifinals. An unusual trend of home court blowouts would mark the series until the deciding game 7 when the veteran Spurs would pull out a 91–82 win on the Hornets rowdy home court. The win marked the 100th playoff victory for Spurs coach Gregg Popovich.

In the 2008–09 season, the Hornets finished 49–33 and entered the playoffs as a seventh seed. They faced the Denver Nuggets in the first round, losing after five brutal games, including a 58-point loss in game 4, which tied the worst margin of defeat in NBA postseason history. Scott was relieved from his head coaching duties for the Hornets on November 12, 2009, following a 3–6 start. He was mentioned as a candidate for several NBA coaching jobs, including the Los Angeles Clippers, but nothing came to fruition.

Following his dismissal, he briefly served as a studio analyst for the NBA on ESPN.

=== Cleveland Cavaliers ===
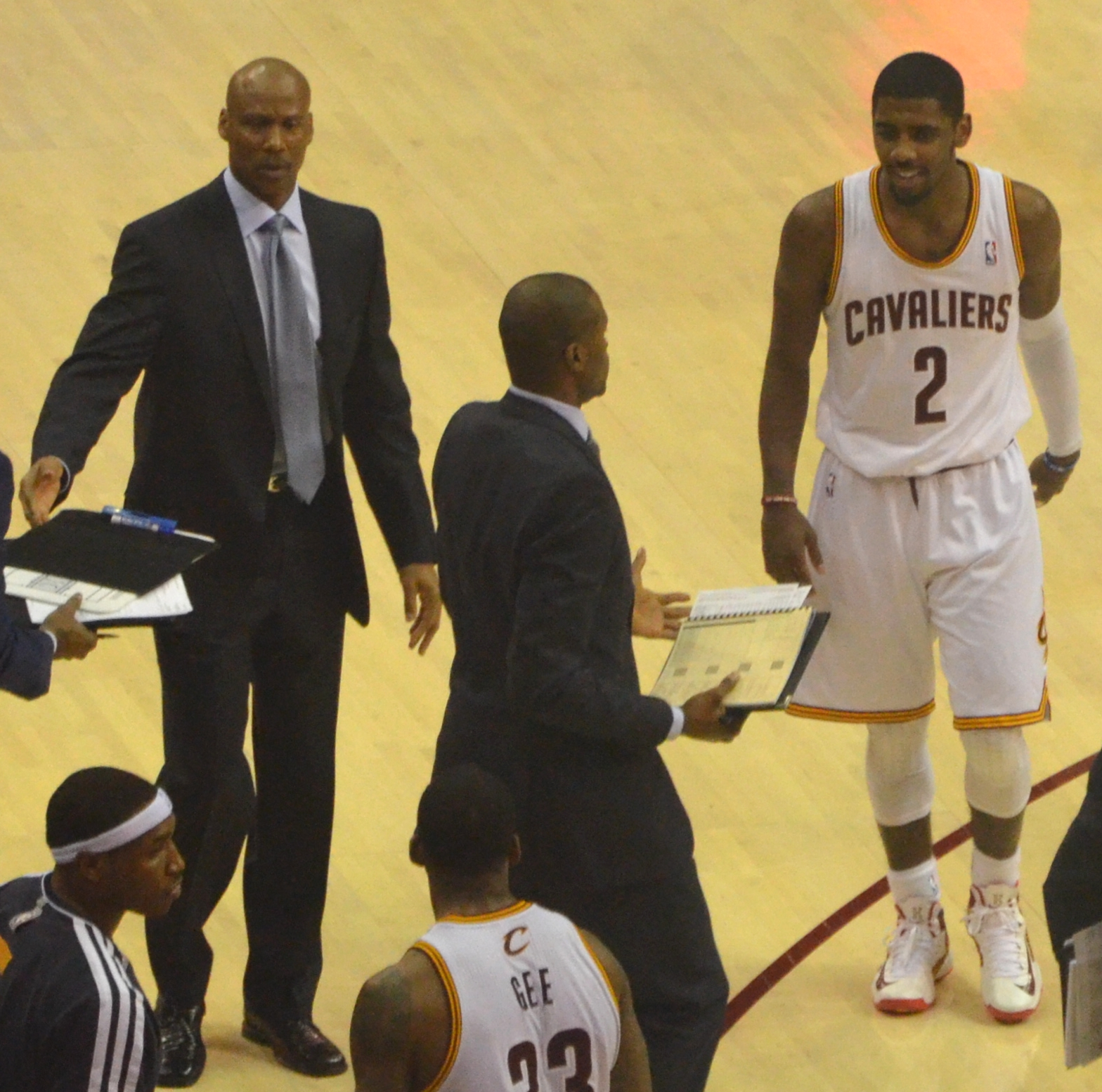
Byron Scott (left) coaching the Cavaliers in 2013

On July 1, 2010, Scott was named head coach of the Cleveland Cavaliers, a few days before the team lost star LeBron James to the Miami Heat. During Scott's first season at the helm of the Cavaliers, he watched his team endure a 26-game losing streak, which was then the longest such streak in NBA history. Scott was reunited with Baron Davis (whom he coached with the Hornets) when a mid-season trade brought Davis to Cleveland, and helped the Cavaliers close the season with several victories, including a 102–90 upset victory over LeBron James and the Miami Heat, which ensured that Cleveland did not have the worst record in the league at the season's end.

Cleveland used their first overall pick to draft Kyrie Irving, who became the second point guard Scott coached to the Rookie of the Year award. His second season in Cleveland saw them show some improvement in a shortened 66-game schedule.

On April 18, 2013, Scott was fired by Cleveland Cavaliers management. Though the Cavaliers ranked in the bottom five of the league in defensive efficiency in each of his three seasons, analysts were surprised at the firing given the team's young and oft-injured rosters. Irving and other Cavaliers players expressed their disappointment with the firing.

=== Los Angeles Lakers ===
Scott spent the 2013–14 season as a Lakers television analyst on Time Warner Cable SportsNet. After the season, he was the frontrunner to become the new Lakers head coach. He interviewed three times for the position, which had become vacant after Mike D'Antoni's resignation. On July 28, 2014, he signed a multi-year contract to coach the Lakers.

With the team rebuilding in 2014–15, Scott finished his first season as coach of the Lakers with a 21–61 record. In the 2015 NBA draft, the Lakers selected Ohio State point guard D'Angelo Russell with the second overall pick. The Lakers finished a franchise-worst 17–65 in 2015–16, Kobe Bryant's final season before retiring. On April 24, 2016, the Lakers did not exercise their option on Scott's contract for the following season, deciding to pursue a new coach. His 38–126 (.232) record with the team was the worst of any of the 16 coaches who had led the franchise for at least two seasons.

== NBA career statistics ==
Legend
GP	Games played	GS	Games started	MPG	Minutes per game
FG%	Field goal percentage	3P%	3-point field goal percentage	FT%	Free throw percentage
RPG	Rebounds per game	APG	Assists per game	SPG	Steals per game
BPG	Blocks per game	PPG	Points per game	**Bold**	Career high
†	Won an NBA championship	*	Led the league

=== NBA ===
==== Regular season ====
Year	Team	GP	GS	MPG	FG%	3P%	FT%	RPG	APG	SPG	BPG	PPG
1983–84	L.A. Lakers	74	49	22.1	.484	.235	.806	2.2	2.4	1.1	.3	10.6
1984–85†	L.A. Lakers	81	65	28.5	**.539**	.433*	.820	2.6	3.0	1.1	.2	16.0
1985–86	L.A. Lakers	76	62	28.8	.513	.361	.784	2.5	2.2	1.1	.2	15.4
1986–87†	L.A. Lakers	**82**	**82**	33.3	.489	**.436**	**.892**	3.5	3.4	1.5	.2	17.0
1987–88†	L.A. Lakers	81	81	**37.6**	.527	.346	.858	**4.1**	**4.1**	**1.9**	.3	**21.7**
1988–89	L.A. Lakers	74	73	35.2	.491	.399	.863	**4.1**	3.1	1.5	**.4**	19.6
1989–90	L.A. Lakers	77	77	33.7	.470	.423	.766	3.1	3.6	1.0	**.4**	15.5
1990–91	L.A. Lakers	**82**	**82**	32.1	.477	.324	.797	3.0	2.2	1.2	.3	14.5
1991–92	L.A. Lakers	**82**	**82**	32.7	.458	.344	.838	3.8	2.8	1.3	.3	14.9
1992–93	L.A. Lakers	58	53	28.9	.449	.326	.848	2.3	2.7	.9	.2	13.7
1993–94	Indiana	67	2	17.9	.467	.365	.805	1.6	2.0	.9	.1	10.4
1994–95	Indiana	80	1	19.1	.455	.389	.850	1.9	1.4	.8	.2	10.0
1995–96	Vancouver	80	0	23.7	.401	.335	.835	2.4	1.5	.8	.3	10.2
1996–97	L.A. Lakers	79	8	18.2	.430	.388	.841	1.5	1.3	.6	.2	6.7
Career		1073	717	28.1	.482	.370	.833	2.8	2.5	1.1	.3	14.1

==== Playoffs ====
Year	Team	GP	GS	MPG	FG%	3P%	FT%	RPG	APG	SPG	BPG	PPG
1984	L.A. Lakers	20	0	20.2	.460	.200	.600	1.9	1.7	.9	.1	8.6
1985†	L.A. Lakers	19	19	30.8	**.517**	.476	.795	2.7	2.6	**2.2**	.2	16.9
1986	L.A. Lakers	14	14	33.6	.497	.353	**.905**	3.9	3.0	1.4	.1	16.0
1987†	L.A. Lakers	18	18	33.8	.490	.206	.791	3.4	3.2	1.1	.2	14.8
1988†	L.A. Lakers	**24**	**24**	37.4	.499	.436	.865	**4.2**	2.5	1.4	.2	19.6
1989	L.A. Lakers	11	11	36.5	.494	.385	.836	4.1	2.3	1.6	.2	**19.9**
1990	L.A. Lakers	9	9	36.1	.462	.382	.769	4.1	2.6	**2.2**	**.3**	13.4
1991	L.A. Lakers	18	18	**37.7**	.511	.526	.794	3.2	1.6	1.3	.2	13.2
1992	L.A. Lakers	4	4	37.0	.500	**.583**	.889	2.5	**3.5**	1.5	**.3**	18.8
1993	L.A. Lakers	5	5	35.4	.500	.533	.783	2.2	1.8	1.0	.0	13.6
1994	Indiana	16	0	14.9	.396	.474	.784	2.1	1.3	.8	.1	7.8
1995	Indiana	17	0	17.5	.340	.265	.882	1.5	.9	.6	.1	6.1
1997	L.A. Lakers	8	0	16.8	.455	.364	.895	1.5	1.4	.1	.0	6.4
Career		183	122	29.3	.482	.395	.819	2.9	2.1	1.2	.2	13.4

== Head coaching record ==
Legend
Regular season	G	Games coached	W	Games won	L	Games lost	W–L %	Win–loss %
Playoffs	PG	Playoff games	PW	Playoff wins	PL	Playoff losses	PW–L %	Playoff win–loss %

Team	Year	G	W	L	W–L%	Finish	PG	PW	PL	PW–L%	Result
New Jersey	2000–01	82	26	56	.317	6th in Atlantic	—	—	—	—	Missed playoffs
New Jersey	2001–02	82	52	30	.634	1st in Atlantic	20	11	9	.550	Lost in NBA Finals
New Jersey	2002–03	82	49	33	.598	1st in Atlantic	20	14	6	.700	Lost in NBA Finals
New Jersey	2003–04	42	22	20	.524	(fired)	—	—	—	—	—
New Orleans	2004–05	82	18	64	.220	5th in Southwest	—	—	—	—	Missed playoffs
New Orleans/Oklahoma City	2005–06	82	38	44	.463	4th in Southwest	—	—	—	—	Missed playoffs
New Orleans/Oklahoma City	2006–07	82	39	43	.476	4th in Southwest	—	—	—	—	Missed playoffs
New Orleans	2007–08	82	56	26	.683	1st in Southwest	12	7	5	.583	Lost in Conference semifinals
New Orleans	2008–09	82	49	33	.598	4th in Southwest	5	1	4	.200	Lost in First round
New Orleans	2009–10	9	3	6	.333	(fired)	—	—	—	—	—
Cleveland	2010–11	82	19	63	.232	5th in Central	—	—	—	—	Missed playoffs
Cleveland	2011–12	66	21	45	.318	5th in Central	—	—	—	—	Missed playoffs
Cleveland	2012–13	82	24	58	.293	5th in Central	—	—	—	—	Missed playoffs
L.A. Lakers	2014–15	82	21	61	.256	5th in Pacific	—	—	—	—	Missed playoffs
L.A. Lakers	2015–16	82	17	65	.207	5th in Pacific	—	—	—	—	Missed playoffs
Career		1,101	454	647	.412		57	33	24	.579	

== Personal life ==
Scott's non-profit organization, The Byron Scott Children's Fund, has raised more than $15 million over the past decade, with the proceeds going to various children's charities. Scott has recently served as a studio analyst for ABC's NBA telecasts and was featured on ESPN.

Scott and his ex-wife, Anita, have 3 children. In June 2013, Scott and Anita separated and in March 2014, he filed for divorce after 29 years of marriage due to irreconcilable differences.

On July 11, 2020, Scott married Cece Gutierrez, a registered nurse and cast member of VH1's reality show Basketball Wives. He converted to Catholicism in late 2020 following their marriage.

Scott went back to school at Arizona State 37 years after leaving school early when he was drafted by the Lakers, and obtained a bachelor's degree in liberal arts, fulfilling a promise he'd made to his late mother.

In 2022, a woman identified as Hayley Dylan filed a civil lawsuit alleging that Byron Scott sexually assaulted her in 1987, when she was 15 years old and Scott was 26. According to the complaint, the incident occurred at Campbell Hall School in Studio City, Los Angeles, while the Los Angeles Lakers were visiting the school to film an instructional basketball video and meet with students and faculty. Dylan alleges that Scott took her to a locked janitor's closet in the school's gymnasium, where he sexually assaulted her. The lawsuit, initially filed with Scott identified as “John Doe,” was brought under California's Child Victims Act, which temporarily extended the statute of limitations for civil claims involving childhood sexual abuse. Scott was publicly identified as a defendant in an amended complaint filed in May 2025.

Scott has acknowledged that a sexual encounter occurred but disputes Dylan's account of the circumstances. Through his attorney, he has stated that he believed Dylan was over 18 and did not know she was a minor at the time. The case is a civil proceeding, and Scott has not been criminally charged in connection with the allegations. Campbell Hall was also named as a defendant and reached a confidential settlement with Dylan in 2026. Scott's civil trial was scheduled to begin in September 2026, but was placed on hold after he filed for Chapter 7 bankruptcy, which triggered an automatic stay of the proceedings.

== See also ==
- List of NBA career playoff games played leaders
