= Jerome Kersey =

American basketball player (1962–2015)

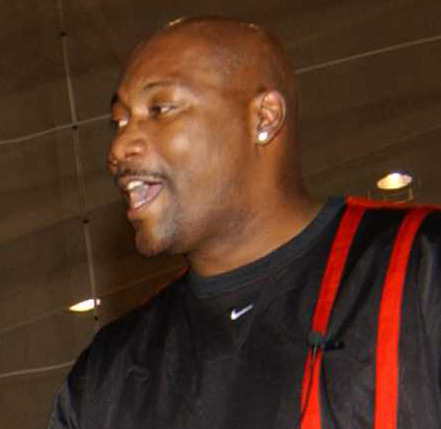
- Kersey in 2003

Personal information
- Born: June 26, 1962 Clarksville, Virginia, U.S.
- Died: February 18, 2015 (aged 52) Tualatin, Oregon, U.S.
- Listed height: 6 ft 7 in (2.01 m)
- Listed weight: 215 lb (98 kg)

Career information
- High school: Bluestone (Skipwith, Virginia)
- College: Longwood (1980–1984)
- NBA draft: 1984: 2nd round, 46th overall pick
- Drafted by: Portland Trail Blazers
- Playing career: 1984–2001
- Position: Small forward
- Number: 25, 7, 12

Career history
- 1984–1995: Portland Trail Blazers
- 1995–1996: Golden State Warriors
- 1996–1997: Los Angeles Lakers
- 1997–1998: Seattle SuperSonics
- 1999–2000: San Antonio Spurs
- 2000–2001: Milwaukee Bucks

Career highlights
- NBA champion (1999); First-team Division II All-American (1984); Mason–Dixon Player of the Year (1984); First-team All-Mason–Dixon (1984); No. 54 retired by Longwood Lancers

Career NBA statistics
- Points: 11,825 (10.3 ppg)
- Rebounds: 6,339 (5.5 rpg)
- Assists: 2,134 (1.9 apg)
- Stats at NBA.com
- Stats at Basketball Reference

Jerome Kersey (June 26, 1962 – February 18, 2015) was an American professional basketball player in the National Basketball Association (NBA). He played for the Portland Trail Blazers (1984–1995), Golden State Warriors (1995–96), Los Angeles Lakers (1996–97), Seattle SuperSonics (1997–98), San Antonio Spurs (1998–2000), and Milwaukee Bucks (2000–01).

The Trail Blazers selected Kersey in the second round of the 1984 NBA draft from Longwood University (then Longwood College) in Farmville, Virginia. He was a member of the Spurs during their 1999 NBA Finals victory over the New York Knicks. Following his playing career, Kersey worked with his former Portland teammate and then-head coach of the Milwaukee Bucks Terry Porter as an assistant in 2005. Kersey died from a pulmonary embolism caused by a blood clot at his home in Tualatin, Oregon, on February 18, 2015.

== College career ==
Kersey attended the then Longwood College, at the time an NCAA Division II school, where he set school records for points, rebounds, steals and blocked shots while making 57% of his baskets. As a senior, his rebounding average of 14.2 led all Division II players. However, it was not until May 2006 that Kersey graduated from Longwood, having only needed two more college courses to graduate for some years.

== Professional career ==
=== Portland Trail Blazers (1984–1995) ===
Kersey was selected in the second round of the 1984 NBA draft with the 46th overall pick by the Portland Trail Blazers, unusually high for a Division II player. He was a regular contributor from the bench, eventually becoming a starter, and by his third year, he began to shine, even coming in second behind Michael Jordan in the Slam Dunk Contest.

The 1987–88 season was his best statistically, as he averaged 19.2 points and 8.3 rebounds in his first year as a starter. He joined a nucleus of a strong Portland team composed of Clyde Drexler, Terry Porter, Buck Williams, and Kevin Duckworth that made it to the NBA Finals two out of the next three years (in 1990 and 1992). However, in subsequent years the emergence of 6'10" Clifford Robinson at small forward found Kersey spending more time on the bench.

=== Golden State Warriors (1995–1996) ===
By 1995, Portland had several talented forwards, and he was left unprotected in that year's 1995 NBA expansion draft. Taken by the Toronto Raptors, he was waived before the 1995–96 season began. He signed with the Golden State Warriors, where he started 58 games, and had an altercation with Latrell Sprewell, which resulted in the latter threatening to bring a gun to practice.

=== Los Angeles Lakers (1996–1997) ===
For the 1996–97 season Kersey signed with the Los Angeles Lakers as a free agent, and he had a quite productive year, logging his most playing time in five seasons on a team that had been left thin by injuries.

=== Seattle SuperSonics (1997–1998) ===
The 1997–98 season saw Kersey go to his fourth team in four years, but injuries kept him out of the Seattle SuperSonics' lineup for most of the season.

=== San Antonio Spurs (1999–2000) ===
For the lockout-shortened 1998–99 season, Kersey found himself on the San Antonio Spurs. The team won the 1999 NBA championship. Kersey provided frontcourt depth and experience off the bench in the team's title run, although his scoring, rebounding, and minutes played were all career lows. He stayed with the Spurs for another season.

=== Milwaukee Bucks (2000–2001) ===
Kersey spent his final season in the NBA with the Milwaukee Bucks, who fell short in the Eastern Conference Finals. He retired at the conclusion of the 2000–01 season.

== Legacy ==
As a Portland Trail Blazer, Kersey was near the top in many of Portland's career categories at the time of his leaving, including games played (second), minutes played (third), scoring (third), rebounding (second), assists (sixth), steals (third), field goals made (fourth), and blocked shots (second).

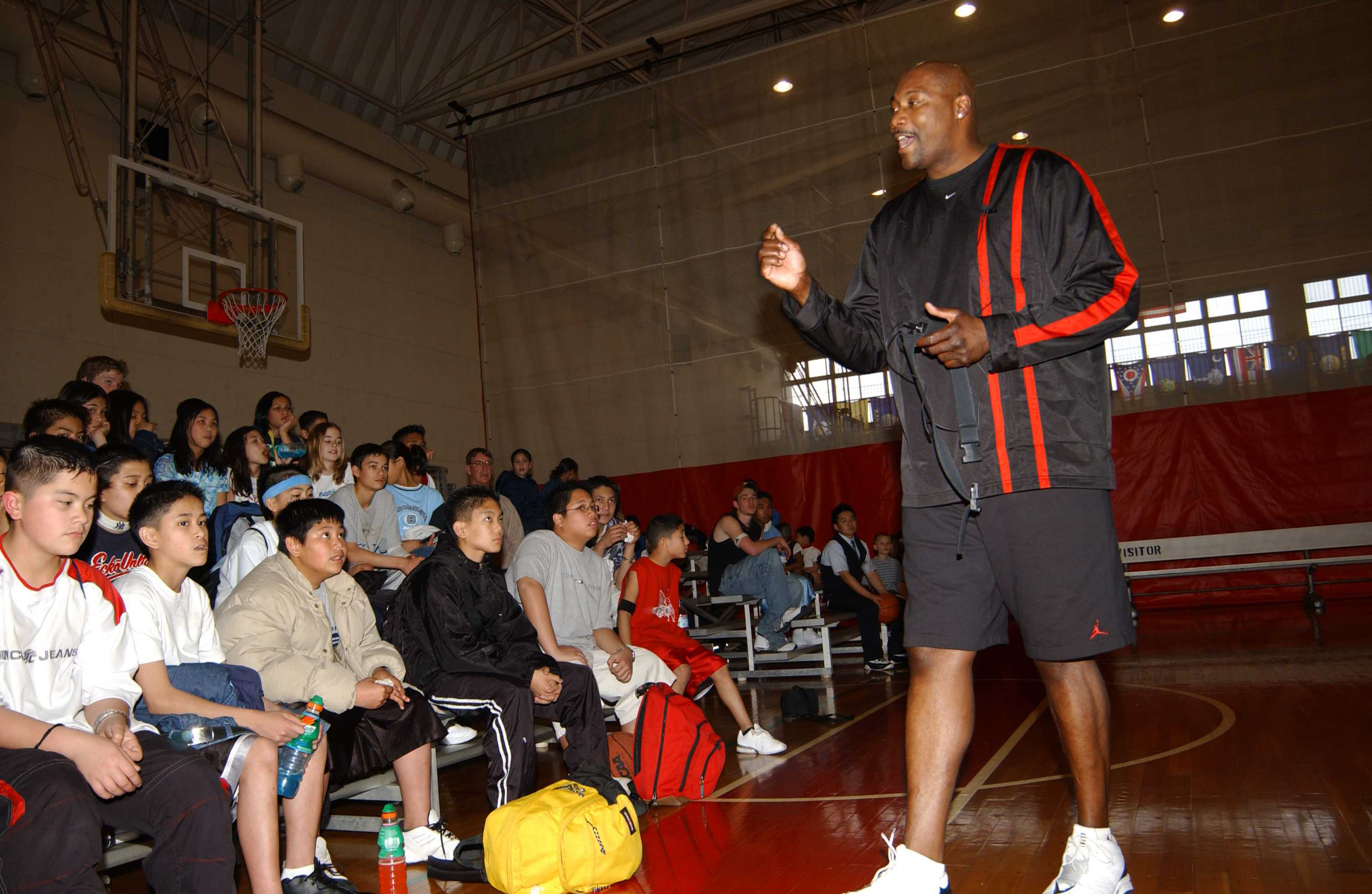
In 2003, Jerome Kersey addresses a group of kids on the basketball court in the Naval Air Facility at Atsugi, Japan

Following his retirement in 2001, Kersey served as a coach in various capacities for several teams. For a short time, Kersey worked for Wells Fargo home mortgages. During the 2003–04 NBA season, Kersey was hired by the Trail Blazers to serve as director of player programs. After a season in that capacity, Kersey was hired as an assistant coach by the Milwaukee Bucks, where he served under his former Portland teammate, head coach Terry Porter. He served with the Bucks for one year, but was let go (along with Mike Schuler, who coached both Kersey and Porter while in Portland) on May 6, 2005. Porter was subsequently fired as the Bucks' coach later that year. For a period of time following, Kersey joined the automotive industry as an auto wholesaler.

In November 2005, Kersey was in Longwood's first Hall of Fame class. Others included baseball player Michael Tucker and LPGA golfer Tina Barrett.

In 2008, Kersey was inducted into the Virginia Sports Hall of Fame and was selected to receive the 2015 recipient of the William Henry Ruffner Alumni Award, the highest award given to a Longwood alumni. The court at Willett Hall, Longwood's basketball facility, was posthumously named in his honor on December 3, 2016.

== Personal life ==
Kersey married his girlfriend of over nine years, Teri (Teresa Folsom) Donnerberg, on September 21, 2013, at the Columbia Edgewater Country Club in Portland, Oregon. Between them they had four children from previous relationships.

== Death ==
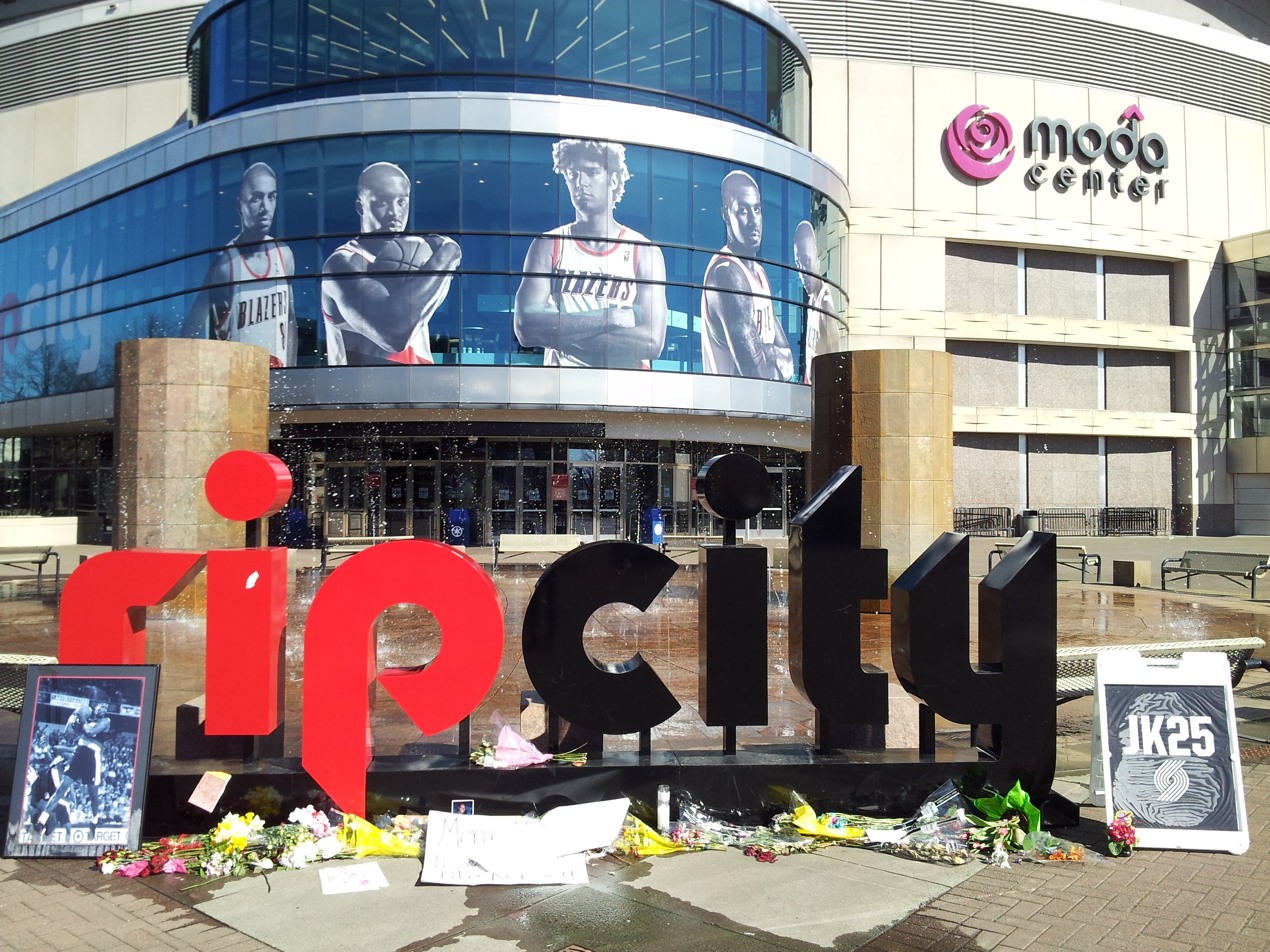
Memorial to Kersey in front of the Moda Center in 2015

On February 18, 2015, Kersey died suddenly at the age of 52. Lake Oswego Fire Department and American Medical Response responded to a call from Kersey's home shortly after 5 pm, and he was taken to Legacy Meridian Park Medical Center in Tualatin, Oregon where he died. Just days prior to his death, Kersey underwent knee surgery. On the day of his death, he left the Trail Blazers' Rose Quarter office because he was not feeling well. Medical examiners linked his death to a blood clot that traveled to his lungs, causing a pulmonary embolism.

== NBA career statistics ==
Legend
| GP | Games played | GS | Games started | MPG | Minutes per game |
| FG% | Field goal percentage | 3P% | 3-point field goal percentage | FT% | Free throw percentage |
| RPG | Rebounds per game | APG | Assists per game | SPG | Steals per game |
| BPG | Blocks per game | PPG | Points per game | **Bold** | Career high |
| † | Won an NBA championship |

=== Regular season ===
| Year | Team | GP | GS | MPG | FG% | 3P% | FT% | RPG | APG | SPG | BPG | PPG |
|---|---|---|---|---|---|---|---|---|---|---|---|---|
| 1984–85 | Portland | 77 | 0 | 12.4 | .478 | .000 | .646 | 2.7 | .8 | .6 | .4 | 6.1 |
| 1985–86 | Portland | 79 | 2 | 15.4 | **.549** | .000 | .681 | 3.7 | 1.1 | 1.1 | .4 | 8.5 |
| 1986–87 | Portland | **82** | 8 | 25.5 | .509 | .043 | .720 | 6.0 | 2.4 | 1.5 | .9 | 12.3 |
| 1987–88 | Portland | 79 | 75 | **36.6** | .499 | .200 | .735 | 8.3 | 3.1 | 1.6 | .8 | **19.2** |
| 1988–89 | Portland | 76 | 76 | 35.7 | .469 | .286 | .694 | 8.3 | **3.2** | **1.8** | **1.1** | 17.5 |
| 1989–90 | Portland | **82** | **82** | 34.7 | .478 | .150 | .690 | **8.4** | 2.3 | 1.5 | .8 | 16.0 |
| 1990–91 | Portland | 73 | 72 | 32.3 | .478 | **.308** | .709 | 6.6 | 3.1 | 1.4 | 1.0 | 14.8 |
| 1991–92 | Portland | 77 | 76 | 33.2 | .467 | .125 | .664 | 8.2 | **3.2** | 1.5 | .9 | 12.6 |
| 1992–93 | Portland | 65 | 50 | 26.4 | .438 | .286 | .634 | 6.2 | 1.9 | 1.2 | .6 | 10.6 |
| 1993–94 | Portland | 78 | 6 | 16.4 | .433 | .125 | .748 | 4.2 | 1.0 | .9 | .6 | 6.5 |
| 1994–95 | Portland | 63 | 0 | 18.1 | .415 | .259 | **.766** | 4.1 | 1.3 | .8 | .6 | 8.1 |
| 1995–96 | Golden State | 76 | 58 | 21.3 | .410 | .176 | .660 | 4.8 | 1.5 | 1.2 | .6 | 6.7 |
| 1996–97 | L. A. Lakers | 70 | 44 | 25.2 | .432 | .262 | .602 | 5.2 | 1.3 | 1.7 | .7 | 6.8 |
| 1997–98 | Seattle | 37 | 2 | 19.4 | .416 | .100 | .600 | 3.6 | 1.2 | 1.4 | .4 | 6.3 |
| 1998–99† | San Antonio | 45 | 0 | 15.5 | .340 | .214 | .429 | 2.9 | .9 | .8 | .3 | 3.2 |
| 1999–00 | San Antonio | 72 | 18 | 18.2 | .412 | .000 | .707 | 3.1 | 1.0 | .9 | .7 | 4.5 |
| 2000–01 | Milwaukee | 22 | 2 | 11.0 | .464 | .000 | .500 | 2.0 | .7 | .6 | .4 | 3.3 |
| Career | | 1,153 | 571 | 24.4 | .465 | .201 | .690 | 5.5 | 1.9 | 1.2 | .7 | 10.3 |

=== Playoffs ===
| Year | Team | GP | GS | MPG | FG% | 3P% | FT% | RPG | APG | SPG | BPG | PPG |
|---|---|---|---|---|---|---|---|---|---|---|---|---|
| 1985 | Portland | 8 | 0 | 7.5 | .516 | – | .750 | 1.1 | .8 | .9 | .3 | 4.8 |
| 1986 | Portland | 4 | 0 | 14.0 | .409 | .000 | **1.000** | 3.8 | 1.0 | .3 | 1.0 | 5.5 |
| 1987 | Portland | 4 | 0 | 15.0 | .400 | – | **1.000** | 4.8 | .8 | 1.3 | .3 | 6.0 |
| 1988 | Portland | 4 | 4 | 31.8 | .492 | .000 | .714 | 7.5 | 2.3 | 1.8 | 1.0 | 19.8 |
| 1989 | Portland | 3 | 3 | 39.0 | .489 | .000 | .789 | 8.0 | 2.3 | **3.3** | .3 | 20.3 |
| 1990 | Portland | **21** | **21** | **39.6** | .460 | .000 | .715 | 8.3 | 2.1 | 1.6 | 1.0 | **20.7** |
| 1991 | Portland | 16 | 16 | 36.8 | .465 | – | .752 | 6.9 | 3.1 | 1.8 | .4 | 17.9 |
| 1992 | Portland | **21** | **21** | 36.0 | .510 | .000 | .693 | 7.7 | **3.6** | 2.0 | .9 | 16.2 |
| 1993 | Portland | 4 | 1 | 24.5 | .524 | **1.000** | .706 | **8.5** | 1.0 | 1.0 | .5 | 14.3 |
| 1994 | Portland | 3 | 0 | 12.7 | .313 | – | .200 | 3.0 | .0 | .3 | .3 | 3.7 |
| 1995 | Portland | 3 | 0 | 21.0 | **.571** | .000 | .667 | 2.7 | 1.0 | 1.0 | .3 | 12.7 |
| 1997 | L. A. Lakers | 9 | 0 | 23.3 | .486 | .000 | .789 | 5.3 | 1.6 | 1.0 | .7 | 5.4 |
| 1998 | Seattle | 10 | 5 | 21.3 | .431 | .000 | .842 | 4.0 | .9 | 1.0 | 1.0 | 7.8 |
| 1999† | San Antonio | 14 | 0 | 10.9 | .349 | .250 | .714 | 2.1 | .3 | .4 | .1 | 2.6 |
| 2000 | San Antonio | 2 | 1 | 12.5 | .143 | – | | 2.0 | .5 | 1.0 | .5 | 1.0 |
| Career | | 126 | 72 | 26.9 | .469 | .095 | .727 | 5.7 | 1.8 | 1.3 | .6 | 12.4 |

== See also ==
- List of NBA career personal fouls leaders
