= Larry Drew =

American basketball player and coach (born 1958)

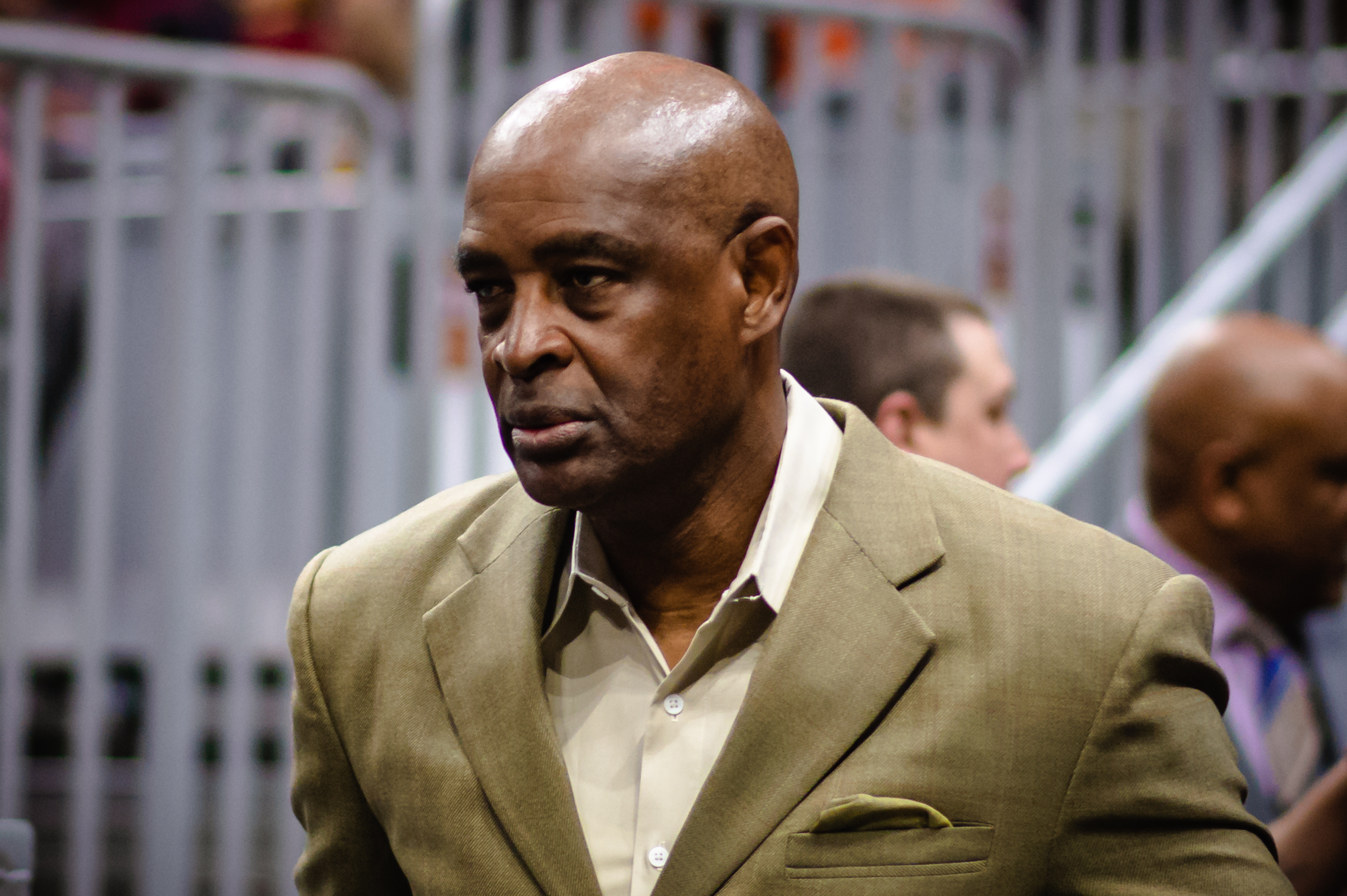
- Drew in 2019

Los Angeles Clippers
- Title: Assistant coach
- League: NBA

Personal information
- Born: April 2, 1958 (age 68) Kansas City, Kansas, U.S.
- Listed height: 6 ft 1 in (1.85 m)
- Listed weight: 170 lb (77 kg)

Career information
- High school: Wyandotte (Kansas City, Kansas)
- College: Missouri (1976–1980)
- NBA draft: 1980: 1st round, 17th overall pick
- Drafted by: Detroit Pistons
- Playing career: 1980–1991
- Position: Point guard
- Number: 22, 2, 10
- Coaching career: 1992–present

Career history

Playing
- 1980–1981: Detroit Pistons
- 1981–1986: Kansas City / Sacramento Kings
- 1986–1988: Los Angeles Clippers
- 1988–1989: Scavolini Pesaro
- 1989–1991: Los Angeles Lakers

Coaching
- 1992–1999: Los Angeles Lakers (assistant)
- 1999–2000: Detroit Pistons (assistant)
- 2000–2003: Washington Wizards (assistant)
- 2003–2004: New Jersey Nets (assistant)
- 2004–2010: Atlanta Hawks (assistant)
- 2010–2013: Atlanta Hawks
- 2013–2014: Milwaukee Bucks
- 2014–2018: Cleveland Cavaliers (assistant)
- 2018–2019: Cleveland Cavaliers
- 2020–present: Los Angeles Clippers (assistant)

Career highlights
- As player: First-team All-Big Eight (1980); As assistant coach: NBA champion (2016)

Career NBA statistics
- Points: 8,110 (11.4 ppg)
- Rebounds: 1,265 (1.8 rpg)
- Assists: 3,702 (5.2 apg)
- Stats at NBA.com
- Stats at Basketball Reference

Larry Donnell Drew (born April 2, 1958) is an American professional basketball coach and former player who serves as assistant coach for the Los Angeles Clippers of the National Basketball Association (NBA).

Drew was named to the Kansas Sports Hall of Fame in 2018.

== College career ==
Drew, a point guard, played college basketball for the Missouri Tigers.

== Professional career ==
=== NBA (1980–1991) ===
Drew was selected by the Detroit Pistons in the first round of the 1980 NBA draft with the 17th overall pick. He played 10 seasons in the NBA for the Pistons, Kansas City/Sacramento Kings, Los Angeles Clippers and Los Angeles Lakers. In his NBA career, Drew played in 714 games and scored a total of 8,110 points.

Perhaps Drew's best year as a professional came during the 1982–83 season as a member of the Kings, appearing in 75 games and averaging 20.1 points, 8.1 assists and 1.7 steals per contest. That season on Jan 21, 1983, Drew scored a career-high 33 points during a 115–108 victory over the Houston Rockets.

=== Scavolini (1988–1989) ===
In 1988–89, Drew played in the Italian League with Scavolini.

== Coaching career ==
Drew served as an assistant coach for the Los Angeles Lakers (1992–1999), Detroit Pistons (1999–2000), Washington Wizards (2000–2003), New Jersey Nets (2003–2004), and Atlanta Hawks (2004–2010).

He became the head coach of the Atlanta Hawks in 2010–11. His contract expired after the 2012–13 season, when the Hawks hired Mike Budenholzer to replace Drew.

On May 31, 2013, the Milwaukee Bucks hired Drew as their head coach. On June 30, 2014, the Bucks fired Drew from their head coaching position after acquiring head coach Jason Kidd from the Brooklyn Nets.

On August 19, 2014, the Cleveland Cavaliers hired Drew as their assistant coach. On June 19, 2016, the Cavaliers with Drew as an assistant coach, won their first NBA Championship. On March 19, 2018, the Cavaliers named Drew interim head coach while Cavaliers coach Tyronn Lue took a leave for health issues. The Cavaliers were 8–1 in the nine games Drew served in Lue's absence. On October 28, 2018, the Cavaliers named Drew their acting head coach following the firing of Lue. Drew sought additional money if he were to be the Cavaliers' interim head coach instead of the team hiring a new leader. On November 5, he was named as permanent head coach. On April 11, 2019, Drew and the Cavaliers parted ways after his contract expired after the 2018–19 season.

On November 16, 2020, Drew was hired as an assistant coach for the Los Angeles Clippers under head coach Tyronn Lue.

== Career playing statistics ==
Legend
GP	Games played	GS	Games started	MPG	Minutes per game
FG%	Field goal percentage	3P%	3-point field goal percentage	FT%	Free throw percentage
RPG	Rebounds per game	APG	Assists per game	SPG	Steals per game
BPG	Blocks per game	PPG	Points per game	**Bold**	Career high

=== NBA ===
==== Regular season ====
Year	Team	GP	GS	MPG	FG%	3P%	FT%	RPG	APG	SPG	BPG	PPG
1980–81	Detroit	76		20.8	.407	.235	.797	1.6	3.3	1.2	**.1**	6.6
1981–82	Kansas City	**81**	19	24.4	.473	.296	.794	1.8	5.4	1.4	.0	10.8
1982–83	Kansas City	75	**74**	**35.9**	.492	.125	.820	**2.8**	**8.1**	**1.7**	**.1**	**20.1**
1983–84	Kansas City	73	73	32.4	.462	.300	.776	2.0	7.6	**1.7**	**.1**	16.4
1984–85	Kansas City	72	66	33.0	**.501**	.250	.794	2.3	6.7	1.3	**.1**	14.9
1985–86	Sacramento	75	36	26.3	.485	.323	.795	1.7	4.5	.9	.0	11.9
1986–87	L.A. Clippers	60	22	26.1	.432	.167	**.837**	1.7	5.4	1.0	.0	12.4
1987–88	L.A. Clippers	74	51	27.4	.456	.289	.769	1.6	5.9	1.0	.0	10.3
1989–90	L.A. Lakers	80	3	16.7	.444	.395	.767	1.2	2.7	.6	**.1**	5.2
1990–91	L.A. Lakers	48	2	10.3	.432	**.424**	.773	.7	2.5	.3	.0	2.9
Career		714	341	25.7	.467	.291	.798	1.8	5.2	1.1	.1	11.4

==== Playoffs ====
Year	Team	GP	GS	MPG	FG%	3P%	FT%	RPG	APG	SPG	BPG	PPG
1984	Kansas City	3		**23.3**	.368	–	**1.000**	**1.3**	3.7	1.0	.0	5.7
1986	Sacramento	3	0	18.7	**.560**	**.333**	**1.000**	.3	**4.7**	**1.7**	.0	**10.3**
1990	L.A. Lakers	7	0	7.3	.375	.250	.833	.3	.6	.4	.0	1.7
1991	L.A. Lakers	**18**	0	6.4	.424	.273	.667	.4	1.2	.0	.0	1.9
Career		31	0	9.5	.447	.278	.824	.5	1.6	.4	.0	3.1

== Head coaching record ==
Legend
Regular season	G	Games coached	W	Games won	L	Games lost	W–L %	Win–loss %
Playoffs	PG	Playoff games	PW	Playoff wins	PL	Playoff losses	PW–L %	Playoff win–loss %

Team	Year	G	W	L	W–L%	Finish	PG	PW	PL	PW–L%	Result
Atlanta	2010–11	82	44	38	.537	3rd in Southeast	12	6	6	.500	Lost in Conf. Semifinals
Atlanta	2011–12	66	40	26	.606	2nd in Southeast	6	2	4	.333	Lost in First Round
Atlanta	2012–13	82	44	38	.537	2nd in Southeast	6	2	4	.333	Lost in First Round
Milwaukee	2013–14	82	15	67	.183	5th in Central	—	—	—	—	Missed playoffs
Cleveland	2018–19	76	19	57	.250	5th in Central	—	—	—	—	Missed playoffs
Career		388	162	226	.418		24	10	14	.417	

== Personal life ==
Drew is married to Sharon Drew and they have three children, Larry II, Landon and Lindsey. His older son, Larry II, played collegiate basketball at North Carolina before transferring to UCLA in 2011. He last played in the NBA for the New Orleans Pelicans. His middle son, Landon, played for Cal State Northridge. His youngest son, Lindsey, played for Nevada.
