= Mel McCants =

American basketball player (born 1967)

Personal information
- Born: August 19, 1967 (age 59) Chicago, Illinois
- Listed height: 6 ft 8 in (2.03 m)
- Listed weight: 240 lb (109 kg)

Career information
- High school: Mt. Carmel (Chicago, Illinois)
- College: Purdue (1985–1989)
- NBA draft: 1989: undrafted
- Position: Small forward
- Number: 49

Career history
- 1989–1990: Los Angeles Lakers
- 1990–1991: Sioux Falls Skyforce

Career highlights
- Third-team All-Big Ten (1987)
- Stats at NBA.com
- Stats at Basketball Reference

Melvin Lamont McCants (born August 19, 1967) is an American retired basketball player. Along with James Farr, Derek Boyd and Chris Calloway, McCants led Chicago's Mount Carmel to the 1985 Illinois state basketball championship. It is the only Illinois AA high school boys basketball championship won by a Chicago Catholic League School. He was selected to the 1982 and 1983 State Farm Holiday Classic all-tournament teams.

After high school, McCants attended Purdue University, located in West Lafayette, Indiana, to play under legendary coach Gene Keady. Along with teammates Troy Lewis and Todd Mitchell, the forward helped the Boilermakers win back-to-back Big Ten Conference titles and NCAA Tournament appearances, including a Sweet Sixteen in 1988. McCants played with the Los Angeles Lakers during the 1989–90 season.

== Career statistics ==
Legend
GP	Games played	GS	Games started	MPG	Minutes per game
FG%	Field goal percentage	3P%	3-point field goal percentage	FT%	Free throw percentage
RPG	Rebounds per game	APG	Assists per game	SPG	Steals per game
BPG	Blocks per game	PPG	Points per game	**Bold**	Career high

=== NBA ===
==== Regular season ====
Year	Team	GP	GS	MPG	FG%	3P%	FT%	RPG	APG	SPG	BPG	PPG
1989–90	L.A. Lakers	13	0	5.0	.308	–	.750	.5	.2	.2	.1	1.7

==== Playoffs ====
Year	Team	GP	GS	MPG	FG%	3P%	FT%	RPG	APG	SPG	BPG	PPG
1990	L.A. Lakers	2	0	2.5	–	–	–	.0	.0	.0	.0	.0
