= 1989–90 Portland Trail Blazers season =

NBA professional basketball team season

- Conference champions
- Head coach: Rick Adelman
- Arena: Memorial Coliseum

Results
- Record: 59–23 (.720)
- Place: Division: 2nd (Pacific); Conference: 3rd (Western)
- Playoff finish: NBA Finals (lost to Pistons 1–4)
- Stats at Basketball Reference

Local media
- Television: KOIN; Northwest Cable Sports
- Radio: KEX

The 1989–90 Portland Trail Blazers season was the 20th season for the Portland Trail Blazers in the National Basketball Association.

== Season summary ==
=== Off-season ===
During the off-season, the Trail Blazers acquired All-Star forward Buck Williams from the New Jersey Nets on draft day, and signed free agent Wayne Cooper. The team also selected power forward Clifford Robinson from the University of Connecticut with the 36th overall pick in the 1989 NBA draft. Croatian rookie shooting guard Dražen Petrović, who was drafted by the Trail Blazers as the 60th overall pick in the 1986 NBA draft, and previous played overseas in Europe, made his debut in the NBA this season.

=== Regular season ===
With the addition of Williams, Robinson and Petrović, the Trail Blazers got off to a 5–3 start to the regular season, and then posted a seven-game winning streak afterwards. The team posted another seven-game winning streak in January, and later on held a 33–13 record at the All-Star break. The Trail Blazers posted a 10-game winning streak in March, and won eight of their final nine games of the season, finishing in second place in the Pacific Division with a 59–23 record, and earning the third seed in the Western Conference; the team qualified for the NBA playoffs for the eighth consecutive year.

Clyde Drexler averaged 23.3 points, 6.9 rebounds, 5.9 assists and 2.0 steals per game, and was named to the All-NBA Third Team. In addition, Terry Porter averaged 17.6 points, 9.1 assists and 1.9 steals per game, while Kevin Duckworth provided the team with 16.2 points and 6.2 rebounds, Jerome Kersey contributed 16.0 points, 8.4 rebounds and 1.5 steals per game, and Williams provided with 13.6 points and 9.8 rebounds per game, and was named to the NBA All-Defensive First Team. Off the bench, Robinson averaged 9.1 points and 3.8 rebounds per game, while Petrović contributed 7.6 points per game, Danny Young provided with 4.7 points and 2.8 assists per game, and Cooper averaged 3.8 points, 4.3 rebounds and 1.2 blocks per game.

During the NBA All-Star weekend at the Miami Arena in Miami, Florida, Drexler was selected for the 1990 NBA All-Star Game, as a member of the Western Conference All-Star team. Williams finished tied in tenth place in Most Valuable Player voting, while Drexler finished in twelfth place, and head coach Rick Adelman finished in third place in Coach of the Year voting. The Trail Blazers finished 20th in the NBA in home-game attendance, with an attendance of 528,132 at the Memorial Coliseum during the regular season.

=== NBA playoffs ===
In the Western Conference First Round of the 1990 NBA playoffs, the Trail Blazers faced off against the 6th–seeded Dallas Mavericks, a team that featured All-Star guard Rolando Blackman, Derek Harper, Roy Tarpley and Sam Perkins. The Trail Blazers won the first two games over the Mavericks at home at the Memorial Coliseum, and took a 2–0 series lead. In Game 3, on the road at the Reunion Arena, and despite losing Williams to an eye injury, and then losing Duckworth to a right hand injury, the Trail Blazers defeated the Mavericks, 106–92 to win the series in a three-game sweep; it was the first time that the Trail Blazers won an NBA playoff series since the 1984–85 season.

In the Western Conference Semi-finals, the team faced off against the 2nd–seeded, and Midwest Division champion San Antonio Spurs, who were led by All-Star center, and Rookie of the Year, David Robinson, All-Star forward Terry Cummings, and second-year star Willie Anderson. Despite starting the series without Duckworth due to his hand injury, the Trail Blazers managed to win the first two games over the Spurs at the Memorial Coliseum, before losing the next two games on the road at the HemisFair Arena. The Trail Blazers won Game 5 over the Spurs at the Memorial Coliseum in double-overtime, 138–132, but then lost Game 6 at the HemisFair Arena by a score of 112–97, as the Spurs evened the series. With the return of Duckworth, the Trail Blazers won Game 7 over the Spurs at the Memorial Coliseum in overtime, 108–105 to win in a hard-fought seven-game series.

In the Western Conference Finals, the Trail Blazers then faced off against the 5th–seeded Phoenix Suns, who were led by the quartet of All-Star forward Tom Chambers, All-Star guard Kevin Johnson, Jeff Hornacek, and sixth man Eddie Johnson. The Trail Blazers took a 2–0 series lead over the Suns, but then lost the next two games on the road, including a Game 4 loss to the Suns at the Arizona Veterans Memorial Coliseum, 119–107. With the series tied at 2–2, the Trail Blazers won Game 5 over the Suns at home, 120–114 at the Memorial Coliseum, and then won Game 6 at the Arizona Veterans Memorial Coliseum, 112–109 to win the series in six games, and advance to the NBA Finals for the second time in franchise history, and for the first time since their championship season of 1976–77.

In the 1990 NBA Finals, the Trail Blazers faced off against the top–seeded, and defending NBA champion Detroit Pistons, who were led by the All-Star trio of Isiah Thomas, Joe Dumars, and Defensive Player of the Year, Dennis Rodman. After losing Game 1 to the Pistons on the road, 105–99 at The Palace of Auburn Hills, the Trail Blazers won Game 2 on the road in overtime, 106–105 to even the series. However, the Trail Blazers lost their next three home games, including a Game 5 loss to the Pistons at the Memorial Coliseum, 92–90, thus losing the series in five games, as the Pistons won their second consecutive NBA championship.

== Draft picks ==
Round	Pick	Player	Position	Nationality	School/Club team
1	22	Byron Irvin	G	United States	Missouri
2	36	Clifford Robinson	PF/C	United States	Connecticut

== Roster ==
1989–90 Portland Trail Blazers roster
Players

Pos.	No.	Player	Height	Weight	DOB	From
F	2	Mark Bryant	6 ft 9 in (2.06 m)	245 lb (111 kg)	1965–04–25	Seton Hall
C	42	Wayne Cooper	6 ft 10 in (2.08 m)	220 lb (100 kg)	1956–11–16	LSU New Orleans
G	22	Clyde Drexler	6 ft 7 in (2.01 m)	210 lb (95 kg)	1962–06–22	Houston
C	00	Kevin Duckworth	7 ft 0 in (2.13 m)	275 lb (125 kg)	1964–04–01	Eastern Illinois
G	23	Byron Irvin	6 ft 5 in (1.96 m)	190 lb (86 kg)	1966–12–02	Missouri
F	33	Nate Johnston	6 ft 8 in (2.03 m)	210 lb (95 kg)	1966–12–18	Tampa
F	25	Jerome Kersey	6 ft 7 in (2.01 m)	215 lb (98 kg)	1962–06–26	Longwood
G	44	Dražen Petrović	6 ft 5 in (1.96 m)	195 lb (88 kg)	1964–10–22	Yugoslavia
G	30	Terry Porter	6 ft 3 in (1.91 m)	195 lb (88 kg)	1963–04–08	UW–Stevens Point
F	3	Clifford Robinson	6 ft 10 in (2.08 m)	225 lb (102 kg)	1966–12–16	Connecticut
F	52	Buck Williams	6 ft 8 in (2.03 m)	215 lb (98 kg)	1960–03–08	Maryland
G	21	Danny Young	6 ft 3 in (1.91 m)	175 lb (79 kg)	1962–07–26	Wake Forest

Coaches
Head coach
- Rick Adelman
Assistant(s)
- Jack Schalow
- John Wetzel

Legend
- (DP) Unsigned draft pick
- (FA) Free agent
- (S) Suspended
- Injured

== Regular season ==
=== Season standings ===
Pacific Division	W	L	PCT	GB	Home	Road	Div
y-Los Angeles Lakers	63	19	.768	–	37–4	26–15	22–6
x-Portland Trail Blazers	59	23	.720	4	35–6	24–17	20–8
x-Phoenix Suns	54	28	.659	9	32–9	22–19	20–8
Seattle SuperSonics	41	41	.500	22	30–11	11–30	11–17
Golden State Warriors	37	45	.451	26	27–14	10–31	11–17
Los Angeles Clippers	30	52	.366	33	20–21	10–31	7–21
Sacramento Kings	23	59	.280	40	16–25	7–34	7–21

#	Western Conference				
#	Team	W	L	PCT	GB
1	z-Los Angeles Lakers	63	19	.768	–
2	y-San Antonio Spurs	56	26	.683	7
3	x-Portland Trail Blazers	59	23	.720	4
4	x-Utah Jazz	55	27	.671	8
5	x-Phoenix Suns	54	28	.659	9
6	x-Dallas Mavericks	47	35	.573	16
7	x-Denver Nuggets	43	39	.524	20
8	x-Houston Rockets	41	41	.500	22
9	Seattle SuperSonics	41	41	.500	22
10	Golden State Warriors	37	45	.451	26
11	Los Angeles Clippers	30	52	.366	33
12	Sacramento Kings	23	59	.280	40
13	Minnesota Timberwolves	22	60	.268	41
14	Charlotte Hornets	19	63	.232	44

z – clinched division title
y – clinched division title
x – clinched playoff spot

=== Game log ===
1989–90 game log
November

Game	Date	Team	Score	High points	High rebounds	High assists	Location Attendance	Record

December

Game	Date	Team	Score	High points	High rebounds	High assists	Location Attendance	Record

January

Game	Date	Team	Score	High points	High rebounds	High assists	Location Attendance	Record

February

Game	Date	Team	Score	High points	High rebounds	High assists	Location Attendance	Record

March

Game	Date	Team	Score	High points	High rebounds	High assists	Location Attendance	Record

April

Game	Date	Team	Score	High points	High rebounds	High assists	Location Attendance	Record

1989–90 schedule

== Playoffs ==
1990 playoff game log
First round: 3–0 (home: 2–0; road: 1–0)

Game	Date	Team	Score	High points	High rebounds	High assists	Location Attendance	Series
1	April 26	Dallas	W 109–102	Terry Porter (28)	Buck Williams (16)	Porter, Drexler (5)	Memorial Coliseum; 12,884	1–0
2	April 28	Dallas	W 114–107	Kevin Duckworth (18)	Buck Williams (13)	Clyde Drexler (7)	Memorial Coliseum; 12,884	2–0
3	May 1	@ Dallas	W 106–92	Jerome Kersey (29)	Buck Williams (10)	Clyde Drexler (10)	Reunion Arena; 17,007	3–0

Conference Semi-finals: 4–3 (home: 4–0; road: 0–3)

Game	Date	Team	Score	High points	High rebounds	High assists	Location Attendance	Record
1	May 5	San Antonio	W 107–94	Jerome Kersey (25)	Jerome Kersey (16)	Clyde Drexler (11)	Memorial Coliseum; 12,884	1–0
2	May 8	San Antonio	W 122–112	Terry Porter (27)	Buck Williams (8)	Clyde Drexler (8)	Memorial Coliseum; 12,884	2–0
3	May 10	@ San Antonio	L 98–121	Porter, Williams (18)	Clifford Robinson (8)	Clyde Drexler (9)	HemisFair Arena; 15,910	2–1
4	May 12	@ San Antonio	L 105–115	Clyde Drexler (27)	Buck Williams (10)	Clyde Drexler (7)	HemisFair Arena; 15,910	2–2
5	May 15	San Antonio	W 138–132 (2OT)	Terry Porter (38)	Kersey, Williams (10)	Clyde Drexler (9)	Memorial Coliseum; 12,884	3–2
6	May 17	@ San Antonio	L 97–112	Jerome Kersey (22)	Buck Williams (10)	Clyde Drexler (7)	HemisFair Arena; 15,910	3–3
7	May 19	San Antonio	W 108–105 (OT)	Terry Porter (36)	Williams, Kersey (15)	Terry Porter (9)	Memorial Coliseum; 12,884	4–3

Conference finals: 4–2 (home: 3–0; road: 1–2)

Game	Date	Team	Score	High points	High rebounds	High assists	Location Attendance	Record
1	May 21	Phoenix	W 100–98	Clyde Drexler (20)	Jerome Kersey (11)	Terry Porter (9)	Memorial Coliseum; 12,884	1–0
2	May 23	Phoenix	W 108–107	Jerome Kersey (29)	Jerome Kersey (11)	Clyde Drexler (6)	Memorial Coliseum; 12,884	2–0
3	May 25	@ Phoenix	L 89–123	Jerome Kersey (16)	Mark Bryant (7)	Clyde Drexler (6)	Arizona Veterans Memorial Coliseum; 14,487	2–1
4	May 27	@ Phoenix	L 107–119	Jerome Kersey (29)	Buck Williams (8)	Terry Porter (12)	Arizona Veterans Memorial Coliseum; 14,487	2–2
5	May 29	Phoenix	W 120–114	Clyde Drexler (32)	Jerome Kersey (11)	Terry Porter (12)	Memorial Coliseum; 12,884	3–2
6	May 31	@ Phoenix	W 112–109	Drexler, Porter (23)	Buck Williams (11)	Drexler, Porter (7)	Arizona Veterans Memorial Coliseum; 14,487	4–2

NBA Finals: 1–4 (home: 0–3; road: 1–1)

Game	Date	Team	Score	High points	High rebounds	High assists	Location Attendance	Record
1	June 5	@ Detroit	L 99–105	Clyde Drexler (21)	Buck Williams (12)	Terry Porter (8)	The Palace at Auburn Hills; 21,454	0–1
2	June 7	@ Detroit	W 106–105 (OT)	Clyde Drexler (33)	Buck Williams (12)	Terry Porter (10)	The Palace at Auburn Hills; 21,454	1–1
3	June 10	Detroit	L 106–121	Jerome Kersey (27)	Clyde Drexler (13)	Terry Porter (9)	Memorial Coliseum; 12,884	1–2
4	June 12	Detroit	L 109–112	Clyde Drexler (34)	Drexler, Kersey (8)	Clyde Drexler (10)	Memorial Coliseum; 12,642	1–3
5	June 14	Detroit	L 90–92	Duckworth, Porter (21)	Jerome Kersey (9)	Terry Porter (9)	Memorial Coliseum; 12,642	1–4

1990 schedule

== Player statistics ==
Legend
GP	Games played	GS	Games started	MPG	Minutes per game
FG%	Field-goal percentage	3P%	3-point field-goal percentage	FT%	Free-throw percentage
RPG	Rebounds per game	APG	Assists per game	SPG	Steals per game
BPG	Blocks per game	PPG	Points per game

=== Regular season ===
Player	GP	GS	MPG	FG%	3P%	FT%	RPG	APG	SPG	BPG	PPG
Jerome Kersey	82	82	34.7	.478	.150	.690	8.4	2.3	1.5	.8	16.0
Buck Williams	82	82	34.2	.548	.000	.706	9.8	1.4	.8	.5	13.6
Kevin Duckworth	82	82	30.0	.478		.740	6.2	1.1	.4	.4	16.2
Danny Young	82	8	17.0	.421	.271	.813	1.5	2.8	1.0	.0	4.7
Clifford Robinson	82	0	19.1	.397	.273	.550	3.8	.9	.6	.6	9.1
Terry Porter	80	80	34.8	.462	.374	.892	3.4	9.1	1.9	.1	17.6
Wayne Cooper	79	0	14.9	.454	.000	.641	4.3	.6	.2	1.2	3.8
Dražen Petrović	77	0	12.6	.485	.459	.844	1.4	1.5	.3	.0	7.6
Clyde Drexler	73	73	36.8	.494	.283	.774	6.9	5.9	2.0	.7	23.3
Mark Bryant	58	0	9.7	.458		.560	2.5	.2	.3	.2	2.9
Byron Irvin	50	2	9.8	.473	.357	.670	1.5	.9	.6	.0	5.2
Nate Johnston^{†}	15	0	4.9	.378	.000	.636	1.4	.1	.2	.5	2.3
Robert Reid^{†}	12	1	7.1	.394	.333	.500	.7	.7	.2	.2	2.6

=== Playoffs ===
Player	GP	GS	MPG	FG%	3P%	FT%	RPG	APG	SPG	BPG	PPG
Clyde Drexler	21	21	40.6	.441	.220	.774	7.2	7.1	2.5	.9	21.4
Jerome Kersey	21	21	39.6	.460	.000	.715	8.3	2.1	1.6	1.0	20.7
Terry Porter	21	21	38.8	.464	.392	.842	2.9	7.4	1.3	.1	20.6
Buck Williams	21	21	37.0	.508		.676	9.2	1.9	.6	.3	13.0
Clifford Robinson	21	6	18.6	.358	.000	.558	4.1	1.1	.9	1.1	6.5
Danny Young	21	0	14.0	.389	.379	.704	1.4	1.5	.7	.1	4.1
Dražen Petrović	20	0	12.7	.440	.313	.583	1.6	1.0	.3	.0	6.1
Wayne Cooper	18	0	13.8	.404		.526	3.9	.3	.3	1.6	2.7
Kevin Duckworth	15	15	30.2	.439		.717	5.8	1.1	.3	.6	13.1
Mark Bryant	13	0	12.3	.545		.750	2.2	.2	.2	.2	3.2
Byron Irvin	4	0	11.8	.227		.833	2.0	1.3	.5	.0	3.8
Nate Johnston	3	0	6.3	.545		1.000	2.0	.3	.3	.3	4.3

- ^{†} Denotes player spent time with another team in the season. Stats reflect time with the Trail Blazers only.

Player statistics citation:

== Awards and records ==
During the season, Dražen Petrović won the Euroscar, presented by the Italian basketball magazine Superbasket to the top player in Europe. Unlike major NBA awards, the Euroscar is awarded for a player's performance during a calendar year, and also takes into account a player's performances for his national team. In Petrović's case, the award considered his performances in 1989 for Real Madrid and the Yugoslavia national team, as well as the Blazers. This was the second of what would eventually be four Euroscars for Petrović.

== Transactions ==
=== Free agents ===
Subtractions
Player	Date signed	New team
Steve Johnson	Expansion Draft June 15, 1989	Minnesota Timberwolves
