= 1989–90 Los Angeles Lakers season =

Season of National Basketball Association team the Los Angeles Lakers

- Division champions
- Head coach: Pat Riley
- General manager: Jerry West
- Owners: Jerry Buss
- Arena: Great Western Forum

Results
- Record: 63–19 (.768)
- Place: Division: 1st (Pacific); Conference: 1st (Western)
- Playoff finish: Conference semifinals (lost to Suns 1–4)
- Stats at Basketball Reference

Local media
- Television: KCAL-TV; Prime Ticket (Chick Hearn, Stu Lantz)
- Radio: KLAC (Chick Hearn, Stu Lantz)

The 1989–90 Los Angeles Lakers season was the 42nd season for the Los Angeles Lakers in the National Basketball Association, and their 30th in Los Angeles, California.

== Season summary ==
=== Off-season ===
The Lakers had the 26th overall pick in the 1989 NBA draft, and selected Yugoslavian center Vlade Divac. During the off-season, the team signed free agent Larry Drew. The Lakers were coming off an NBA Finals defeat, in which they lost to the Detroit Pistons in a four-game sweep in the 1989 NBA Finals.

=== Regular season ===
With the addition of Divac, and despite the retirement of All-Star center Kareem Abdul-Jabbar, the Lakers got off to a fast start by winning ten of their first eleven games of the regular season, which included a nine-game winning streak in November, and later on held a 35–11 record at the All-Star break. The team posted a seven-game winning streak between March and April, and won 16 of their final 19 games of the season. The Lakers finished in first place in the Pacific Division with a league-best 63–19 record, and earned the first seed in the Western Conference; the team qualified for the NBA playoffs for the 14th consecutive year.

Magic Johnson averaged 22.3 points, 6.6 rebounds, 11.5 assists and 1.7 steals per game, led the Lakers with 106 three-point field goals, and was named to the All-NBA First Team, while James Worthy averaged 21.1 points, 6.0 rebounds and 3.6 assists per game, and was named to the All-NBA Third Team, and Byron Scott contributed 15.5 points and 3.6 assists per game. In addition, A.C. Green provided the team with 12.9 points and 8.7 rebounds per game, while sixth man Orlando Woolridge contributed 12.7 points per game, and Mychal Thompson provided with 10.1 points and 6.8 rebounds per game. Off the bench, Divac averaged 8.5 points, 6.2 rebounds and 1.4 blocks per game, and was named to the NBA All-Rookie First Team, while defensive guard Michael Cooper contributed 6.4 points and 2.7 assists per game, and Drew provided with 5.2 points and 2.7 assists per game.

During the NBA All-Star weekend at the Miami Arena in Miami, Florida, Johnson, Worthy and Green were all selected for the 1990 NBA All-Star Game, as members of the Western Conference All-Star team, while head coach Pat Riley was selected to coach the Western Conference; it was Green's first and only All-Star appearance. Johnson scored 22 points along with 6 rebounds and 4 assists, and was named the NBA All-Star Game Most Valuable Player, despite the Western Conference losing to the Eastern Conference, 130–113. Johnson was also named the NBA Most Valuable Player of the Year for the third time in four years, in a controversial voting over Charles Barkley of the Philadelphia 76ers; Johnson received fewer first-place votes (27 of the 92 cast) than Barkley (38), but totaled 636 points in the ballot compared to Barkley's 614. Meanwhile, Riley was named the NBA Coach of the Year for the first time, and Woolridge finished tied in third place in Sixth Man of the Year voting.

The Lakers finished sixth in the NBA in home-game attendance, with an attendance of 712,498 at the Great Western Forum during the regular season.

=== NBA playoffs ===
In the Western Conference First Round of the 1990 NBA playoffs, the Lakers faced off against the 8th–seeded Houston Rockets, a team that featured All-Star center Akeem Olajuwon, Otis Thorpe and Sleepy Floyd. The Lakers won the first two games over the Rockets at home at the Great Western Forum, before losing Game 3 on the road, 114–108 at The Summit. The Lakers won Game 4 over the Rockets on the road, 109–88 to win the series in four games.

In the Western Conference Semi-finals, and for the second consecutive year, the team faced off against the 5th–seeded Phoenix Suns, who were led by the quartet of All-Star forward Tom Chambers, All-Star guard Kevin Johnson, Jeff Hornacek, and sixth man Eddie Johnson. The Lakers lost Game 1 to the Suns at the Great Western Forum, 104–102, but managed to win Game 2 at home, 124–100 to even the series. However, the Lakers lost the next two games on the road at the Arizona Veterans Memorial Coliseum, before losing Game 5 to the Suns at the Great Western Forum by a score of 106–103, despite a 43-point performance from Magic Johnson, thus losing the series in five games; it was the first time in nine years that the Lakers did not reach the Western Conference Finals, ending a run that started in 1982, the longest series of consecutive NBA Conference Finals appearances since Bill Russell's Boston Celtics in 1969.

=== Aftermath ===
Following the season, Riley resigned as head coach after nine seasons with the Lakers; he would later on return to coach the New York Knicks for the 1991–92 season. Meanwhile, Woolridge was traded to the Denver Nuggets, and Cooper was released to free agency, and left to play overseas in Italy.

== Draft picks ==
Round	Pick	Player	Position	Nationality	College/Club
1	26	Vlade Divac	C	Yugoslavia	(Socialist Federal Republic of Yugoslavia) KK Partizan

== Roster ==
1989–90 Los Angeles Lakers roster
Players

Pos.	No.	Player	Height	Weight	DOB	From
G	21	Michael Cooper	6 ft 5 in (1.96 m)	170 lb (77 kg)	1956–04–15	New Mexico
C	12	Vlade Divac	7 ft 1 in (2.16 m)	243 lb (110 kg)	1968–02–03	SFR Yugoslavia
G	10	Larry Drew	6 ft 1 in (1.85 m)	170 lb (77 kg)	1958–04–02	Missouri
F	45	A.C. Green	6 ft 9 in (2.06 m)	220 lb (100 kg)	1963–10–04	Oregon State
G	32	Magic Johnson	6 ft 9 in (2.06 m)	215 lb (98 kg)	1959–08–14	Michigan State
F	49	Mel McCants	6 ft 8 in (2.03 m)	240 lb (109 kg)	1967–08–19	Purdue
C	31	Mark McNamara	6 ft 11 in (2.11 m)	235 lb (107 kg)	1959–06–08	California
G	4	Byron Scott	6 ft 3 in (1.91 m)	195 lb (88 kg)	1961–03–28	Arizona State
C	43	Mychal Thompson	6 ft 10 in (2.08 m)	226 lb (103 kg)	1955–01–30	Minnesota
F	3	Jay Vincent	6 ft 7 in (2.01 m)	220 lb (100 kg)	1959–06–10	Michigan State
F	0	Orlando Woolridge	6 ft 9 in (2.06 m)	215 lb (98 kg)	1959–12–16	Notre Dame
F	42	James Worthy	6 ft 9 in (2.06 m)	225 lb (102 kg)	1961–02–27	North Carolina

Coaches
Head coach
- Pat Riley
Assistant(s)
- Bill Bertka
- Jim Eyen
- Randy Pfund

Legend
- (DP) Unsigned draft pick
- (FA) Free agent
- (S) Suspended
- Injured

== Regular season ==
=== Season standings ===
Pacific Division	W	L	PCT	GB	Home	Road	Div
y-Los Angeles Lakers	63	19	.768	–	37–4	26–15	22–6
x-Portland Trail Blazers	59	23	.720	4	35–6	24–17	20–8
x-Phoenix Suns	54	28	.659	9	32–9	22–19	20–8
Seattle SuperSonics	41	41	.500	22	30–11	11–30	11–17
Golden State Warriors	37	45	.451	26	27–14	10–31	11–17
Los Angeles Clippers	30	52	.366	33	20–21	10–31	7–21
Sacramento Kings	23	59	.280	40	16–25	7–34	7–21

#	Western Conference				
#	Team	W	L	PCT	GB
1	z-Los Angeles Lakers	63	19	.768	–
2	y-San Antonio Spurs	56	26	.683	7
3	x-Portland Trail Blazers	59	23	.720	4
4	x-Utah Jazz	55	27	.671	8
5	x-Phoenix Suns	54	28	.659	9
6	x-Dallas Mavericks	47	35	.573	16
7	x-Denver Nuggets	43	39	.524	20
8	x-Houston Rockets	41	41	.500	22
9	Seattle SuperSonics	41	41	.500	22
10	Golden State Warriors	37	45	.451	26
11	Los Angeles Clippers	30	52	.366	33
12	Sacramento Kings	23	59	.280	40
13	Minnesota Timberwolves	22	60	.268	41
14	Charlotte Hornets	19	63	.232	44

z – clinched division title
y – clinched division title
x – clinched playoff spot

== Game log ==
=== Regular season ===
1989–90 game log
Total: 63–19 (home: 37–4; road: 26–15)
November: 11–2 (home: 7–0; road: 4–2)

Game	Date	Team	Score	High points	High rebounds	High assists	Location Attendance	Record
1	November 3	@ Dallas	W 102-94	James Worthy (22)	A.C. Green (14)	Magic Johnson (12)	Reunion Arena; 17,007	1–0
2	November 4	@ San Antonio	L 98-106	James Worthy (25)	Magic Johnson (10)	Magic Johnson (9)	HemisFair Arena; 15,868	1-1
3	November 7	Phoenix	W 111-107	James Worthy (35)	Byron Scott (10)	Michael Cooper (8)	Great Western Forum; 17,505	2–1
4	November 9	@ Golden State	W 106-95	A.C. Green (24)	A.C. Green (16)	Magic Johnson (10)	Oakland-Alameda County Coliseum Arena; 15,025	3–1
5	November 10	Charlotte	W 106-100	Byron Scott (33)	Vlade Divac (9)	Magic Johnson (9)	Great Western Forum; 17,505	4–1
6	November 12	Dallas	W 107-98	Johnson & Worthy (22)	Mychal Thompson (11)	Magic Johnson (7)	Great Western Forum; 16,927	5–1
7	November 15	Indiana	W 117-94	A.C. Green (24)	A.C. Green (16)	Magic Johnson (11)	Great Western Forum; 16,226	6–1
8	November 17	Denver	W 119-105	A.C. Green (27)	A.C. Green (13)	Magic Johnson (24)	Great Western Forum; 17,505	7–1
9	November 19	Washington	W 120-115	Magic Johnson (25)	3 players tied (10)	Magic Johnson (14)	Great Western Forum; 17,505	8–1
10	November 25	@ Utah	W 92-86	Magic Johnson (25)	Green & Thompson (11)	Magic Johnson (11)	Salt Palace; 12,616	9–1
11	November 26	San Antonio	W 132-112	Johnson & Scott (24)	A.C. Green (8)	Magic Johnson (10)	Great Western Forum; 17,505	10–1
12	November 28	@ Houston	L 104-110	Magic Johnson (24)	Magic Johnson (13)	Magic Johnson (9)	The Summit; 16,611	10–2
13	November 30	@ Sacramento	W 109-93	James Worthy (22)	Divac & Green (10)	Magic Johnson (15)	ARCO Arena; 17,014	11–2

December: 10–4 (home: 5–1; road: 5–3)

Game	Date	Team	Score	High points	High rebounds	High assists	Location Attendance	Record
14	December 1	Detroit	L 97-108 (OT)	Magic Johnson (28)	James Worthy (13)	Magic Johnson (10)	Great Western Forum; 17,505	11–3
15	December 3	New York	W 115-104	James Worthy (22)	Divac & Thompson (8)	Magic Johnson (11)	Great Western Forum; 17,505	12–3
16	December 5	L.A. Clippers	W 111-103	Magic Johnson (34)	A.C. Green (10)	Magic Johnson (10)	Great Western Forum; 16,035	13–3
17	December 7	Phoenix	W 100-96	James Worthy (27)	Johnson & Worthy (11)	Magic Johnson (12)	Great Western Forum; 17,257	14–3
18	December 9	@ Washington	L 101-103	James Worthy (26)	James Worthy (10)	Magic Johnson (14)	Capital Centre; 18,756	14–4
19	December 10	@ Orlando	L 103-108	James Worthy (31)	Vlade Divac (13)	Magic Johnson (8)	Orlando Arena; 15,077	14–5
20	December 12	@ Charlotte	W 103-89	Magic Johnson (27)	Vlade Divac (13)	Magic Johnson (10)	Charlotte Coliseum; 23,901	15–5
21	December 13	@ Miami	W 102-75	James Worthy (21)	Magic Johnson (10)	Magic Johnson (8)	Miami Arena; 15,008	16–5
22	December 15	@ Boston	W 119-110	James Worthy (28)	A.C. Green (11)	Magic Johnson (21)	Boston Garden; 14,890	17–5
23	December 16	@ New Jersey	W 99-92	Magic Johnson (28)	A.C. Green (9)	Magic Johnson (8)	Brendan Byrne Arena; 20,049	18–5
24	December 19	@ Chicago	L 83-93	James Worthy (19)	Magic Johnson (12)	Magic Johnson (10)	Chicago Stadium; 18,676	18–6
25	December 20	@ Minnesota	W 106-97 (OT)	Magic Johnson (26)	A.C. Green (15)	Magic Johnson (9)	Target Center; 25,689	19–6
26	December 26	Sacramento	W 104-102	Magic Johnson (27)	A.C. Green (11)	Magic Johnson (14)	Great Western Forum; 17,505	20–6
27	December 29	Golden State	W 130-111	James Worthy (34)	James Worthy (12)	Magic Johnson (17)	Great Western Forum; 17,505	21–6

January: 10–5 (home: 7–1; road: 3–4)

Game	Date	Team	Score	High points	High rebounds	High assists	Location Attendance	Record
28	January 3	Denver	W 114-98	Magic Johnson (27)	James Worthy (13)	Larry Drew (8)	Great Western Forum; 17,505	22–6
29	January 6	@ Golden State	L 131-133	James Worthy (30)	A.C. Green (18)	Magic Johnson (16)	Oakland-Alameda County Coliseum Arena; 15,025	22–7
30	January 7	Miami	W 132-93	Divac & Johnson (21)	Vlade Divac (14)	Magic Johnson (9)	Great Western Forum; 17,505	23–7
31	January 9	@ Phoenix	L 118-121 (OT)	James Worthy (25)	A.C. Green (15)	Magic Johnson (24)	Arizona Veterans Memorial Coliseum; 14,487	23–8
32	January 10	Orlando	W 121-106	Byron Scott (20)	A.C. Green (9)	Magic Johnson (13)	Great Western Forum; 16,534	24–8
33	January 12	Houston	W 107-98	Magic Johnson (31)	Johnson & Thompson (11)	Magic Johnson (11)	Great Western Forum; 17,505	25–8
34	January 15	Sacramento	W 111-91	Divac & Green (25)	Mychal Thompson (12)	Magic Johnson (10)	Great Western Forum; 16,844	26–8
35	January 17	Seattle	W 100-90	James Worthy (24)	James Worthy (13)	Magic Johnson (9)	Great Western Forum; 17,505	27–8
36	January 19	@ Milwaukee	L 102-103	Magic Johnson (26)	A.C. Green (9)	Magic Johnson (10)	Bradley Center; 18,633	27–9
37	January 21	@ Detroit	W 107-97	James Worthy (31)	Green & Thompson (9)	Magic Johnson (16)	The Palace of Auburn Hills; 21,454	28–9
38	January 23	@ New York	W 118-97	Byron Scott (19)	A.C. Green (14)	Magic Johnson (13)	Madison Square Garden; 18,212	29–9
39	January 24	@ Indiana	W 120-111	Magic Johnson (32)	A.C. Green (11)	James Worthy (12)	Market Square Arena; 16,912	30–9
40	January 26	Milwaukee	W 100-91	James Worthy (21)	Vlade Divac (11)	Magic Johnson (17)	Great Western Forum; 17,505	31–9
41	January 29	San Antonio	L 84-86	James Worthy (32)	3 players tied (9)	Larry Drew (8)	Great Western Forum; 17,505	31–10
42	January 30	@ L.A. Clippers	L 104-121	Byron Scott (24)	Vlade Divac (10)	Magic Johnson (7)	Los Angeles Memorial Sports Arena; 15,350	31–11

February: 10–2 (home: 5–2; road: 5–0)

Game	Date	Team	Score	High points	High rebounds	High assists	Location Attendance	Record
43	February 2	Atlanta	W 112-106	Byron Scott (20)	Magic Johnson (9)	Magic Johnson (13)	Great Western Forum; 17,505	32–11
44	February 4	New Jersey	W 121-105	Johnson & Scott (22)	3 players tied (8)	Magic Johnson (13)	Great Western Forum; 17,505	33–11
45	February 6	@ Portland	W 121-119 (OT)	James Worthy (25)	Magic Johnson (10)	Magic Johnson (15)	Memorial Coliseum; 12,884	34–11
46	February 7	Chicago	W 121-103	James Worthy (30)	Mychal Thompson (10)	Magic Johnson (17)	Great Western Forum; 17,505	35–11
All-Star Break
47	February 14	Portland	L 128-132 (2OT)	Magic Johnson (33)	A.C. Green (10)	Magic Johnson (15)	Great Western Forum; 17,505	35–12
48	February 15	@ Sacramento	W 101-92	James Worthy (20)	Mychal Thompson (9)	Magic Johnson (8)	ARCO Arena; 17,014	36–12
49	February 18	Boston	W 116-110	Magic Johnson (30)	Mychal Thompson (8)	Magic Johnson (13)	Great Western Forum; 17,505	37–12
50	February 20	@ San Antonio	W 115-114 (OT)	James Worthy (27)	Magic Johnson (13)	Magic Johnson (8)	HemisFair Arena; 15,910	38–12
51	February 21	@ Denver	W 113-111	Byron Scott (24)	A.C. Green (12)	Magic Johnson (17)	McNichols Sports Arena; 17,022	39–12
52	February 23	Philadelphia	W 122-116	Green & Scott (24)	Vlade Divac (10)	Magic Johnson (17)	Great Western Forum; 17,506	40–12
53	February 25	Utah	L 103-104	Magic Johnson (32)	A.C. Green (13)	Magic Johnson (16)	Great Western Forum; 17,505	40–13
54	February 28	@ Seattle	W 112-107	Magic Johnson (25)	A.C. Green (11)	Magic Johnson (8)	Seattle Center Coliseum; 14,542	41–13

March: 12–4 (home: 7–0; road: 5–4)

Game	Date	Team	Score	High points	High rebounds	High assists	Location Attendance	Record
55	March 2	Cleveland	W 124-93	Magic Johnson (26)	Divac & Green (7)	Magic Johnson (8)	Great Western Forum; 17,505	42–13
56	March 4	Minnesota	W 115-96	A.C. Green (27)	A.C. Green (10)	Magic Johnson (15)	Great Western Forum; 17,505	43–13
57	March 6	@ Houston	L 95-112	Magic Johnson (27)	James Worthy (9)	Magic Johnson (8)	The Summit; 16,611	43–14
58	March 7	@ Dallas	W 103-91	James Worthy (24)	Green & Woolridge (7)	Magic Johnson (11)	Reunion Arena; 17,007	44–14
59	March 9	Golden State	W 131-115	Magic Johnson (33)	Magic Johnson (13)	Magic Johnson (16)	Great Western Forum; 17,505	45–14
60	March 11	@ Atlanta	W 123-115	Magic Johnson (32)	Mychal Thompson (9)	Magic Johnson (14)	Omni Coliseum; 16,371	46–14
61	March 12	@ Charlotte	W 107-102	James Worthy (26)	Magic Johnson (9)	Magic Johnson (15)	Charlotte Coliseum; 23,901	47–14
62	March 14	@ Philadelphia	L 110-116	Magic Johnson (34)	3 players tied (6)	Magic Johnson (9)	The Spectrum; 18,168	47–15
63	March 15	@ Cleveland	L 96-112	A.C. Green (20)	A.C. Green (9)	Magic Johnson (10)	Richfield Coliseum; 20,273	47–16
64	March 17	@ Minnesota	W 101-99	Magic Johnson (37)	Mychal Thompson (8)	Magic Johnson (13)	Hubert H. Humphrey Metrodome; 43,606	48–16
65	March 20	Charlotte	W 109-97	Byron Scott (21)	Green & Woolridge (8)	Johnson & Scott (6)	Great Western Forum; 17,505	49–16
66	March 23	L.A. Clippers	W 110-102	Magic Johnson (28)	A.C. Green (12)	Magic Johnson (8)	Great Western Forum; 17,505	50–16
67	March 25	Seattle	W 116-94	Johnson & Woolridge (18)	Vlade Divac (12)	Magic Johnson (5)	Great Western Forum; 17,505	51–16
68	March 27	@ Portland	L 111-130	Byron Scott (24)	James Worthy (10)	Magic Johnson (7)	Memorial Coliseum; 12,884	51–17
69	March 28	@ L.A. Clippers	W 106-99	James Worthy (27)	Mychal Thompson (8)	Byron Scott (8)	Los Angeles Memorial Sports Arena; 15,350	52–17
70	March 30	Portland	W 135-106	Magic Johnson (25)	Johnson & Thompson (10)	Magic Johnson (14)	Great Western Forum; 17,505	53–17

April: 10–2 (home: 6–0; road: 4–2)

Game	Date	Team	Score	High points	High rebounds	High assists	Location Attendance	Record
71	April 1	Utah	W 119-103	Magic Johnson (33)	Mychal Thompson (11)	Magic Johnson (13)	Great Western Forum; 17,505	54–17
72	April 5	Sacramento	W 110-103	Johnson & Woolridge (21)	Green & Thompson (8)	Magic Johnson (16)	Great Western Forum; 17,505	55–17
73	April 6	@ Phoenix	W 103-99	James Worthy (29)	Vlade Divac (9)	Magic Johnson (10)	Arizona Veterans Memorial Coliseum; 14,487	56–17
74	April 8	@ Denver	W 116-109	James Worthy (28)	A.C. Green (18)	James Worthy (9)	McNichols Sports Arena; 17,022	57–17
75	April 9	Dallas	W 113-106	Magic Johnson (38)	Vlade Divac (11)	Magic Johnson (8)	Great Western Forum; 17,505	58–17
76	April 12	@ Utah	L 104-107	James Worthy (33)	A.C. Green (15)	Magic Johnson (9)	Salt Palace; 12,616	58–18
77	April 13	Golden State	W 131-119	A.C. Green (24)	A.C. Green (11)	Magic Johnson (13)	Great Western Forum; 17,505	59–18
78	April 15	Houston	W 113-102	Magic Johnson (25)	Vlade Divac (13)	Magic Johnson (11)	Great Western Forum; 17,505	60–18
79	April 17	@ Seattle	W 102-101	James Worthy (22)	A.C. Green (13)	Magic Johnson (8)	Seattle Center Coliseum; 14,489	61–18
80	April 19	Minnesota	W 113-89	Orlando Woolridge (23)	A.C. Green (9)	Michael Cooper (12)	Great Western Forum; 17,505	62–18
81	April 21	@ L.A. Clippers	W 125-115	Magic Johnson (30)	Magic Johnson (8)	Magic Johnson (12)	Los Angeles Memorial Sports Arena; 15,350	63–18
82	April 22	@ Portland	L 88-130	Green & Woolridge (17)	A.C. Green (11)	Larry Drew (5)	Memorial Coliseum; 12,884	63–19

1989–90 schedule

=== Playoffs ===
1990 playoff game log
Total: 4–5 (home: 3–2; road: 1–3)
First Round: 3–1 (home: 2–0; road: 1–1)

Game	Date	Team	Score	High points	High rebounds	High assists	Location Attendance	Series
1	April 27	Houston	W 101–89	James Worthy (34)	James Worthy (11)	Magic Johnson (14)	Great Western Forum; 17,505	1–0
2	April 29	Houston	W 104–100	James Worthy (32)	Magic Johnson (7)	Magic Johnson (14)	Great Western Forum; 17,505	2–0
3	May 1	@ Houston	L 108–114	James Worthy (26)	Magic Johnson (8)	Magic Johnson (18)	The Summit; 16,611	2–1
4	May 3	@ Houston	W 109–88	James Worthy (20)	James Worthy (7)	Magic Johnson (8)	The Summit; 16,611	3–1

Conference Semi-finals: 1–4 (home: 1–2; road: 0–2)

Game	Date	Team	Score	High points	High rebounds	High assists	Location Attendance	Series
1	May 8	Phoenix	L 102–104	Johnson & Worthy (22)	A.C. Green (13)	Magic Johnson (14)	Great Western Forum; 17,505	0–1
2	May 10	Phoenix	W 124–100	James Worthy (27)	A.C. Green (13)	Magic Johnson (14)	Great Western Forum; 17,505	1–1
3	May 12	@ Phoenix	L 103–117	James Worthy (27)	A.C. Green (10)	Magic Johnson (16)	Arizona Veterans Memorial Coliseum; 14,487	1–2
4	May 13	@ Phoenix	L 101–114	Magic Johnson (43)	A.C. Green (18)	Magic Johnson (10)	Arizona Veterans Memorial Coliseum; 14,487	1–3
5	May 15	Phoenix	L 103–106	Magic Johnson (43)	Divac & Johnson (8)	Magic Johnson (7)	Great Western Forum; 17,505	1–4

1990 schedule

== Player statistics ==
Legend
GP	Games played	GS	Games started	MPG	Minutes per game
FG%	Field-goal percentage	3P%	3-point field-goal percentage	FT%	Free-throw percentage
RPG	Rebounds per game	APG	Assists per game	SPG	Steals per game
BPG	Blocks per game	PPG	Points per game

=== Regular season ===
Los Angeles Lakers statistics
Player	GP	GS	MPG	FG%	3P%	FT%	RPG	APG	SPG	BPG	PPG
Steve Bucknall	18	0	4.2	.273	.000	.833	.4	.6	.1	.1	1.3
Michael Cooper	80	10	23.1	.387	.318	.883	2.8	2.7	.8	.5	6.4
Vlade Divac	82	5	19.6	.499	.000	.708	6.2	.9	1.0	1.4	8.5
Larry Drew	80	3	16.7	.444	.395	.767	1.2	2.7	.6	.1	5.2
A.C. Green	82	82	33.0	.478	.283	.751	8.7	1.1	.8	.6	12.9
Mike Higgins^{†}	6	0	3.0			.500	.2	.2	.2	.3	.2
Magic Johnson	79	79	37.2	.480	.384	.890	6.6	11.5	1.7	.4	22.3
Mel McCants	13	0	5.0	.308		.750	.5	.2	.2	.1	1.7
Mark McNamara	33	1	5.8	.442		.650	1.9	.1	.1	.0	3.1
Jawann Oldham^{†}	3	0	3.0	.667		.500	.3	.3	.0	.0	1.7
Byron Scott	77	77	33.7	.470	.423	.766	3.1	3.6	1.0	.4	15.5
Mychal Thompson	70	70	26.9	.500		.706	6.8	.6	.5	1.0	10.1
Jay Vincent^{†}	24	1	8.3	.526	.000	.667	1.1	.4	.3	.1	3.8
Orlando Woolridge	62	2	22.9	.556	.000	.733	3.0	1.5	.6	.7	12.7
James Worthy	80	80	37.0	.548	.306	.782	6.0	3.6	1.2	.6	21.1

=== Playoffs ===
Los Angeles Lakers statistics
Player	GP	GS	MPG	FG%	3P%	FT%	RPG	APG	SPG	BPG	PPG
Michael Cooper	9	0	19.2	.286	.250		2.7	2.8	.8	.4	2.6
Vlade Divac	9	1	19.4	.727	.500	.895	5.3	1.1	.9	1.7	9.1
Larry Drew	7	0	7.3	.375	.250	.833	.3	.6	.4	.0	1.7
A.C. Green	9	9	28.0	.519		.750	9.0	1.0	.6	.4	11.8
Magic Johnson	9	9	41.8	.490	.200	.886	6.3	12.8	1.2	.1	25.2
Mel McCants	2	0	2.5				.0	.0	.0	.0	.0
Mark McNamara	2	0	2.5	.250			.5	.0	.0	.0	1.0
Byron Scott	9	9	36.1	.462	.382	.769	4.1	2.6	2.2	.3	13.4
Mychal Thompson	9	8	25.0	.477		.615	4.3	.2	.2	1.4	6.4
Jay Vincent	3	0	2.7	.000			.0	.0	.0	.0	.0
Orlando Woolridge	9	0	22.1	.571	.000	.703	2.6	1.1	.9	.9	11.8
James Worthy	9	9	40.7	.497	.250	.837	5.6	3.0	1.6	.3	24.2

- ^{†} Denotes player spent time with another team in the season. Stats reflect time with the Lakers only.

Player statistics citation:

== Awards and records ==
- Magic Johnson, NBA Most Valuable Player Award
- Pat Riley, NBA Coach of the Year Award
- Magic Johnson, All-NBA First Team
- James Worthy, All-NBA Third Team
- Magic Johnson, NBA All-Star Game Most Valuable Player Award
- Vlade Divac, NBA All-Rookie Team 1st Team
