= Kevin Duckworth =

American basketball player (1964–2008)

Personal information
- Born: April 1, 1964 Harvey, Illinois, U.S.
- Died: August 25, 2008 (aged 44) Gleneden Beach, Oregon, U.S.
- Listed height: 7 ft 0 in (2.13 m)
- Listed weight: 300 lb (136 kg)

Career information
- High school: Thornridge (Dolton, Illinois)
- College: Eastern Illinois (1982–1986)
- NBA draft: 1986: 2nd round, 33rd overall pick
- Drafted by: San Antonio Spurs
- Playing career: 1986–1997
- Position: Center
- Number: 54, 00

Career history
- 1986: San Antonio Spurs
- 1986–1993: Portland Trail Blazers
- 1993–1995: Washington Bullets
- 1995–1996: Milwaukee Bucks
- 1996–1997: Los Angeles Clippers

Career highlights
- 2× NBA All-Star (1989, 1991); NBA Most Improved Player (1988); First-team All-MCC (1986); MCC tournament MVP (1986)

Career statistics
- Points: 8,085 (11.8 ppg)
- Rebounds: 3,945 (5.8 rpg)
- Assists: 598 (0.9 apg)
- Stats at NBA.com
- Stats at Basketball Reference

Kevin Jerome Duckworth (April 1, 1964 – August 25, 2008) was an American professional basketball player who played as center in the National Basketball Association (NBA). A native of Illinois, he played college basketball for the Eastern Illinois Panthers before being selected by the San Antonio Spurs in the second round of the 1986 NBA draft. Before completing his rookie season with the Spurs, he was traded to the Portland Trail Blazers where he spent most of his six seasons and was named the NBA's Most Improved Player and a two-time All-Star. After playing with three more teams he retired in 1997 and returned to Oregon where he would later work for the Trail Blazers' organization.

== Early life and career ==
Duckworth was born in Harvey, Illinois, and grew up in Chicago, where he played basketball at Thornridge High School. At Thornridge, he participated in the 1980 and 1981 Illinois State Holiday Classic tournaments, which eventually became known as the State Farm Holiday Classic. Duckworth surpassed Cody Winter to become the greatest scorer in the event's history.

He attended Eastern Illinois University (EIU), where he set a university record of 867 rebounds, a record that still held at the time of his death. He also led EIU to the Mid-Continent Conference Tournament Championship in 1985 and was the tournament MVP in 1986.

== Professional career ==
Duckworth was the ninth pick in the 2nd round of the 1986 NBA draft, chosen by the San Antonio Spurs. Later that season, he was traded to the Portland Trail Blazers for rookie Walter Berry.

His rookie season was unspectacular, as Duckworth came off the bench to back up center Steve Johnson (who in turn got the starting center position when Sam Bowie suffered a broken leg). However, the next season Johnson went down with an injury (in addition; Bowie broke his leg again at the beginning of the season), and Duckworth was pushed into the starting role, from where he averaged 15.8 points and 7.4 rebounds per game. Also, after having previously never averaged over 70.0 percent from the free throw line, he shot 77% that year, rebounded well, and played good defense – earning him the 1988 NBA Most Improved Player Award.

The following season, Duckworth improved his averages to 18.1 points and 8.0 rebounds, and was named to the Western Conference All-Star team. After the 1988–89 campaign, Bowie was traded to the New Jersey Nets for Buck Williams and Steve Johnson. Johnson was left unprotected in the 1989 expansion draft, allowing Duckworth to become the starting center.

The 1990 and 1991 seasons were also successful for Duckworth and the Blazers. Although 1988–89 was statistically Duckworth's best season, the team enjoyed greater success in the following years — advancing to the NBA Finals in 1990, and posting a 63–19 record in 1990–91. The presence of Williams as the starting power forward, with rebounding as his main assignment, allowed Duckworth to concentrate on scoring and defense. In 1991 Duckworth was selected as an NBA All-Star for a second time.

Duckworth's production began to slip in 1991–92, he was outplayed at times in the 1992 NBA Finals and was even less productive throughout the following season. At the end of 1992–93, Duckworth was traded to the Washington Bullets for forward Harvey Grant.

Duckworth played two seasons with the Bullets, where he struggled with weight problems. During the 1994–95 season, during which he was reported to weigh 310 lbs, he was suspended indefinitely for not staying in good physical condition. He was traded to the Milwaukee Bucks for Bob McCann during the 1995–96 season, missing most of the season due to injuries. He then played for the Los Angeles Clippers in 1996–97, after which he retired from professional basketball.

== NBA career statistics ==
Legend
GP	Games played	GS	Games started	MPG	Minutes per game
FG%	Field goal percentage	3P%	3-point field goal percentage	FT%	Free throw percentage
RPG	Rebounds per game	APG	Assists per game	SPG	Steals per game
BPG	Blocks per game	PPG	Points per game	**Bold**	Career high

=== Regular season ===
Year	Team	GP	GS	MPG	FG%	3P%	FT%	RPG	APG	SPG	BPG	PPG
1986–87	San Antonio	14	1	8.7	.400	.000	.643	2.2	0.4	0.4	0.2	3.2
1986–87	Portland	51	0	14.8	.491	.000	.692	3.8	0.5	0.3	0.4	6.0
1987–88	Portland	78	50	28.5	**.496**	.000	.770	7.4	0.8	0.4	0.4	15.8
1988–89	Portland	79	79	**33.7**	.477	.000	.757	**8.0**	0.8	**0.7**	**0.6**	**18.1**
1989–90	Portland	**82**	**82**	30.0	.478	.000	.740	6.2	1.1	0.4	0.4	16.2
1990–91	Portland	81	81	31.0	.481	.000	**.772**	6.6	1.1	0.4	0.4	15.8
1991–92	Portland	**82**	**82**	27.1	.461	.000	.690	6.1	**1.2**	0.5	0.5	10.7
1992–93	Portland	74	55	23.8	.438	.000	.730	5.2	0.9	0.6	0.5	9.9
1993–94	Washington	69	52	21.5	.417	.000	.667	4.7	0.8	0.5	0.5	6.6
1994–95	Washington	40	22	20.5	.442	.200	.643	4.9	0.5	0.5	**0.6**	7.1
1995–96	Milwaukee	8	1	7.3	.214	.000	.500	0.9	0.3	0.3	0.0	1.1
1996–97	L.A Clippers	26	22	14.8	.437	**.750**	.688	2.3	0.6	0.3	0.4	4.0
Career		684	527	25.5	.468	.208	.736	5.8	0.9	0.5	0.5	11.8

=== Playoffs ===
Year	Team	GP	GS	MPG	FG%	3P%	FT%	RPG	APG	SPG	BPG	PPG
1987	Portland	4	0	13.3	**.500**	.000	.400	2.0	0.3	**1.0**	0.3	3.5
1988	Portland	4	4	**37.8**	.486	.000	.783	**11.0**	1.8	0.3	0.5	**21.5**
1989	Portland	3	3	27.7	.400	.000	.545	5.7	0.7	0.3	0.3	11.3
1990	Portland	15	15	30.2	.439	.000	.717	5.8	1.1	0.3	**0.6**	13.1
1991	Portland	16	16	31.9	.401	.000	.732	6.7	0.9	0.5	0.5	11.7
1992	Portland	**21**	**21**	30.8	.495	.000	.660	5.6	**2.0**	0.5	**0.6**	11.9
1993	Portland	4	0	14.5	.333	.000	**1.000**	3.3	0.8	0.0	0.3	4.5
Career		67	59	29.2	.447	.000	.702	5.9	1.3	0.4	0.5	11.7

== Post-retirement ==
In 1996, Duckworth and Kermit Washington opened Le'Slam Sports Cafe in Vancouver, Washington. He settled in Tigard, Oregon, with his girlfriend Tala and her two children Aria and Beau.

He was a Heritage Ambassador for the Trail Blazers and was active in the community. He spent several years at the end of his life working at Royal Marine Sales, a small locally owned company where he bought and sold small yachts.

== Death ==
Duckworth died of heart failure on August 25, 2008, in Gleneden Beach, Oregon. He collapsed in his hotel room, and emergency services were unable to revive him. His death was confirmed by the Lincoln County Sheriff's Office. Duckworth was in town as part of a Trail Blazers group hosting a free children's basketball clinic. An autopsy identified the cause of death as hypertrophic cardiomyopathy with congestive heart failure. He was 44.

Following his death, the Portland Trail Blazers and the Oregon Community Foundation established a memorial scholarship in Duckworth's name for college and professional training for students in Oregon and Southwest Washington, the Portland Trail Blazers wore a memorial stripe on their jerseys and a patch on their warmups stitched with Duckworth's number ('00') during the 2008–09 season, and the Portland City Council renamed the L-shaped dock adjacent to the floating portion of Vera Katz Eastbank Esplanade after Duckworth, calling it the Kevin J. Duckworth Memorial Dock. Led by the advocacy of Human Access Project, the city of Portland made a commitment in September 2017 to convert the Kevin J. Duckworth Memorial Dock to a fishing, swimming and non-motorized dock.
