= 1990 NBA playoffs =

Postseason tournament

Tournament details
- Dates: April 26–June 14, 1990
- Season: 1989–90
- Teams: 16

Final positions
- Champions: Detroit Pistons (2nd title)
- Runners-up: Portland Trail Blazers
- Semifinalists: Chicago Bulls; Phoenix Suns

Tournament statistics
- Scoring leader(s): Michael Jordan (Bulls) (36.7 PPG)

Awards
- MVP: Isiah Thomas (Pistons)

The 1990 NBA playoffs was the postseason tournament of the National Basketball Association's 1989–90 season. The tournament concluded with the Eastern Conference champion Detroit Pistons defeating the Western Conference champion Portland Trail Blazers 4 games to 1 in the NBA Finals. Isiah Thomas was named NBA Finals MVP.

It was the Blazers' first trip to the NBA Finals since their victory in the 1977 NBA Finals.

The New York Knicks fell behind 2–0 to the Boston Celtics in their first round matchup, but took the series 3–2 by winning Game 5 121–114 in Boston Garden. Prior to this, the Celtics had beaten the Knicks 26 straight at the Boston Garden. This deciding game featured a missed dunk by Larry Bird late in the fourth with the Celtics trailing by four (103–99) and a clinching 3-point basket by Patrick Ewing on a play where he chased down an errant pass by Charles Oakley on the sideline in front of the Knicks' bench and hurled up a desperation shot as the shot clock was reaching zero. The basket put the Knicks up 113-101 and essentially clinched the game and the series.

The Phoenix Suns defeated the Los Angeles Lakers in a playoff series for the first time ever. It also marked the first time since 1981 that the Lakers failed to reach the Western Conference Finals, ending the longest such run since the Bill Russell-led Boston Celtics, who made the Eastern Conference Finals thirteen consecutive times between 1957 and 1969.

It was the first NBA Finals to not feature the Lakers or Celtics since 1979.

The Chicago Bulls lost Game 7 of the Eastern Conference Finals 93–76 in Detroit, making it the third straight year they were ousted in the playoffs by the Pistons.

The Indiana Pacers made only their third playoff appearance since their NBA debut in the 1976–77 season; they proceeded to make the playoffs 16 out of the next 17 years (missing only in 1997).

The Dallas Mavericks made their only playoff appearance of the decade. They did not return until 2001.

Game 5 of the NBA Finals was the last NBA game to be televised on CBS.

== Bracket ==
First Round	Conference Semifinals
E1	Detroit*	3
E8	Indiana	0
E1	Detroit*	4
E5	New York	1
E4	Boston	2
E5	New York	3
Eastern Conference
E3	Chicago	3
E6	Milwaukee	1
E3	Chicago	4
E2	Philadelphia*	1
E2	Philadelphia*	3
E7	Cleveland	2
W1	LA Lakers*	3
W8	Houston	1
W1	LA Lakers*	1
W5	Phoenix	4
W4	Utah	2
W5	Phoenix	3
Western Conference
W3	Portland	3
W6	Dallas	0
W3	Portland	4
W2	San Antonio*	3
W2	San Antonio*	3
W7	Denver	0

Conference Finals
E1	Detroit*	4
E3	Chicago	3
W5	Phoenix	2
W3	Portland	4

NBA Finals
E1	Detroit*	4
W3	Portland	1

- * Division winner
- Bold Series winner
- Italic Team with home-court advantage

== First round ==
=== Eastern Conference first round ===
==== (1) Detroit Pistons vs. (8) Indiana Pacers ====
April 26

Boxscore

Indiana Pacers 92, Detroit Pistons 104
Scoring by quarter: 17–32, 28–24, 29–26, 18–22
Pts: Detlef Schrempf 26; Rebs: Detlef Schrempf 7 Asts: Vern Fleming 8	Pts: James Edwards 21; Rebs: Bill Laimbeer 14; Asts: Thomas, Dumars 5 each
Detroit leads series, 1–0

The Palace of Auburn Hills, Auburn Hills, Michigan
Attendance: 21,454
Referees: Dan Crawford, Mike Mathis, Wally Rooney

April 28

Boxscore

Indiana Pacers 87, Detroit Pistons 100
Scoring by quarter: 16–20, 25–21, 22–33, 24–26
Pts: Reggie Miller 23; Rebs: Chuck Person 12; Asts: Vern Fleming 7	Pts: Bill Laimbeer 22; Rebs: Bill Laimbeer 11; Asts: Isiah Thomas 12
Detroit leads series, 2–0

The Palace of Auburn Hills, Auburn Hills, Michigan
Attendance: 21,454
Referees: Joe Forte, Darell Garretson, Ronnie Nunn

May 1

Boxscore

Detroit Pistons 108, Indiana Pacers 96
Scoring by quarter: 26–23, 28–22, 28–27, 26–24
Pts: Isiah Thomas 23; Rebs: Bill Laimbeer 19; Asts: Isiah Thomas 9	Pts: Reggie Miller 22; Rebs: LaSalle Thompson 8 Asts: Reggie Miller 4
Detroit wins series, 3–0

Market Square Arena, Indianapolis, Indiana
Attendance: 15,301
Referees: Paul Mihalak, Jack Nies, Earl Strom

Regular-season series
Detroit won 4–1 in the regular-season series

November 8, 1989

Recap

Detroit Pistons 74, Indiana Pacers 95

Market Square Arena, Indianapolis

December 9, 1989

Recap

Indiana Pacers 93, Detroit Pistons 121

The Palace of Auburn Hills, Auburn Hills, Michigan

January 5, 1990

Recap

Indiana Pacers 99, Detroit Pistons 122

The Palace of Auburn Hills, Auburn Hills, Michigan

March 4, 1990

Recap

Indiana Pacers 105, Detroit Pistons 111

The Palace of Auburn Hills, Auburn Hills, Michigan

April 20, 1990

Recap

Detroit Pistons 121, Indiana Pacers 115 (OT)

Market Square Arena, Indianapolis

This was the first playoff meeting between the Pistons and the Pacers.

==== (2) Philadelphia 76ers vs. (7) Cleveland Cavaliers ====
April 26

Boxscore

Cleveland Cavaliers 106, Philadelphia 76ers 111
Scoring by quarter: 21–22, 28–23, 33–40, 24–26
Pts: Hot Rod Williams 23; Rebs: Hot Rod Williams 10; Asts: Mark Price 12	Pts: Charles Barkley 38; Rebs: Charles Barkley 21; Asts: Johnny Dawkins 9
Philadelphia leads series, 1–0

Spectrum, Philadelphia, Pennsylvania
Attendance: 15,319
Referees: Joe Forte, Darell Garretson, Tommy Nunez Sr.

April 29

Boxscore

Cleveland Cavaliers 101, Philadelphia 76ers 107
Scoring by quarter: 26–32, 33–24, 19–26, 23–25
Pts: Mark Price 27; Rebs: Brad Daugherty 13; Asts: Craig Ehlo 8	Pts: Charles Barkley 32; Rebs: Rick Mahorn 9 Asts: Johnny Dawkins 11
Philadelphia leads series, 2–0

Spectrum, Philadelphia, Pennsylvania
Attendance: 18,168
Referees: Ron Garretson, Bill Oakes, Ed T. Rush

May 1

Boxscore

Philadelphia 76ers 95, Cleveland Cavaliers 122
Scoring by quarter: 15–32, 32–28, 17–35, 31–27
Pts: Hersey Hawkins 19; Rebs: Charles Barkley 11; Asts: Johnny Dawkins 7	Pts: Craig Ehlo 25; Rebs: Ehlo, Daugherty 10 each Asts: Ehlo, Daugherty 9 each
Philadelphia leads series, 2–1

Richfield Coliseum, Richfield, Ohio
Attendance: 16,317
Referees: Dick Bavetta, Hugh Evans, Eddie F. Rush

May 3

Boxscore

Philadelphia 76ers 96, Cleveland Cavaliers 108
Scoring by quarter: 23–34, 27–26, 32–26, 14–22
Pts: Charles Barkley 23; Rebs: Barkley, Mahorn 11 each Asts: Johnny Dawkins 10	Pts: Brad Daugherty 34; Rebs: Brad Daugherty 9 Asts: Mark Price 18
Series tied, 2–2

Richfield Coliseum, Richfield, Ohio
Attendance: 17,106
Referees: Joe Crawford, Hue Hollins, Jack Nies

May 5

Boxscore

Cleveland Cavaliers 97, Philadelphia 76ers 113
Scoring by quarter: 29–38, 20–21, 23–33, 25–21
Pts: Brad Daugherty 25; Rebs: Hot Rod Williams 13; Asts: Craig Ehlo 5	Pts: Hersey Hawkins 39; Rebs: Charles Barkley 19; Asts: Johnny Dawkins 14
Philadelphia wins series, 3–2

Spectrum, Philadelphia, Pennsylvania
Attendance: 18,168
Referees: Jess Kersey, Jack Madden, Jake O'Donnell

Regular-season series
Tied 2–2 in the regular-season series

November 29, 1989

Recap

Cleveland Cavaliers 84, Philadelphia 76ers 114

Spectrum, Philadelphia

January 12, 1990

Recap

Cleveland Cavaliers 113, Philadelphia 76ers 102

Spectrum, Philadelphia

January 23, 1990

Recap

Philadelphia 76ers 103, Cleveland Cavaliers 88

The Coliseum, Richfield, Ohio

March 13, 1990

Recap

Philadelphia 76ers 102, Cleveland Cavaliers 119

The Coliseum, Richfield, Ohio

This was the first playoff meeting between the Cavaliers and the 76ers.

==== (3) Chicago Bulls vs. (6) Milwaukee Bucks ====
April 27

Boxscore

Milwaukee Bucks 97, Chicago Bulls 111
Scoring by quarter: 27–26, 25–28, 22–25, 23–32
Pts: Alvin Robertson 22; Rebs: Brad Lohaus 7 Asts: Jay Humphries 12	Pts: Michael Jordan 38; Rebs: Scottie Pippen 10; Asts: Scottie Pippen 13
Chicago leads series, 1–0

Chicago Stadium, Chicago, Illinois
Attendance: 18,676
Referees: Bill Oakes, Ed T. Rush, Don Vaden

April 29

Boxscore

Milwaukee Bucks 102, Chicago Bulls 109
Scoring by quarter: 18–33, 34–18, 23–28, 27–30
Pts: Paul Pressey 25; Rebs: Greg Anderson 10; Asts: Paul Pressey 12	Pts: Michael Jordan 36; Rebs: Michael Jordan 9 Asts: Michael Jordan 11
Chicago leads series, 2–0

Chicago Stadium, Chicago, Illinois
Attendance: 18,676
Referees: Dan Crawford, Mike Mathis, Bill Saar

May 1

Boxscore

Chicago Bulls 112, Milwaukee Bucks 119
Scoring by quarter: 31–27, 29–31, 25–32, 27–29
Pts: Michael Jordan 48; Rebs: Horace Grant 11; Asts: Scottie Pippen 9	Pts: Alvin Robertson 38; Rebs: Alvin Robertson 8 Asts: Paul Pressey 12
Chicago leads series, 2–1

Bradley Center, Milwaukee, Wisconsin
Attendance: 18,575
Referees: Joe Crawford, Ron Garretson, Bennett Salvatore

May 3

Boxscore

Chicago Bulls 110, Milwaukee Bucks 86
Scoring by quarter: 27–20, 29–19, 28–21, 26–26
Pts: Michael Jordan 25; Rebs: Horace Grant 14; Asts: Michael Jordan 5	Pts: Alvin Robertson 20; Rebs: Lohaus, Anderson 8 each Asts: Alvin Robertson 4
Chicago wins series, 3–1

Bradley Center, Milwaukee, Wisconsin
Attendance: 18,633
Referees: Bernie Fryer, Paul Mihalak, Jake O'Donnell

Regular-season series
Chicago won 4–1 in the regular-season series

January 6, 1990

Recap

Chicago Bulls 111, Milwaukee Bucks 118

Bradley Center, Milwaukee, Wisconsin

February 18, 1990

Recap

Chicago Bulls 111, Milwaukee Bucks 88

Bradley Center, Milwaukee, Wisconsin

February 27, 1990

Recap

Milwaukee Bucks 96, Chicago Bulls 106

Chicago Stadium, Chicago, Illinois

March 6, 1990

Recap

Chicago Bulls 114, Milwaukee Bucks 105

Bradley Center, Milwaukee, Wisconsin

April 13, 1990

Recap

Milwaukee Bucks 106, Chicago Bulls 116

Chicago Stadium, Chicago, Illinois

This was the third playoff meeting between these two teams, with the Bucks winning the first two meetings.

Previous playoff series
Milwaukee leads 2–0 in all-time playoff series

1974

Chicago Bulls 0, Milwaukee Bucks 4

1974 Western Conference Finals

1985

Chicago Bulls 1, Milwaukee Bucks 3

1985 Eastern Conference First Round

==== (4) Boston Celtics vs. (5) New York Knicks ====
April 26

Boxscore

New York Knicks 105, Boston Celtics 116
Scoring by quarter: 30–28, 29–29, 21–31, 25–28
Pts: Patrick Ewing 22; Rebs: Patrick Ewing 9 Asts: Maurice Cheeks 9	Pts: Larry Bird 24; Rebs: Larry Bird 18; Asts: Larry Bird 10
Boston leads series, 1–0

Boston Garden, Boston, Massachusetts
Attendance: 14,890
Referees: Lee Jones, Jess Kersey, Jack Madden

April 28

Boxscore

New York Knicks 128, Boston Celtics 157
Scoring by quarter: 38–41, 21–33, 34–42, 35–41
Pts: Patrick Ewing 28; Rebs: Charles Oakley 9 Asts: Gerald Wilkins 7	Pts: Kevin McHale 31; Rebs: Robert Parish 16; Asts: Larry Bird 16
Boston leads series, 2–0

Boston Garden, Boston, Massachusetts
Attendance: 14,890
Referees: Paul Mihalak, Tommy Nunez Sr., Earl Strom

May 2

Boxscore

Boston Celtics 99, New York Knicks 102
Scoring by quarter: 28–28, 20–24, 31–29, 20–21
Pts: Larry Bird 31; Rebs: Robert Parish 10; Asts: Larry Bird 8	Pts: Patrick Ewing 33; Rebs: Patrick Ewing 19; Asts: Maurice Cheeks 11
Boston leads series, 2–1

Madison Square Garden, New York City, New York
Attendance: 18,212
Referees: Hue Hollins, Wally Rooney, Ed T. Rush

May 4

Boxscore

Boston Celtics 108, New York Knicks 135
Scoring by quarter: 30–36, 27–29, 28–32, 23–38
Pts: Kevin McHale 24; Rebs: Larry Bird 8 Asts: Johnson, Bagley 6 each	Pts: Patrick Ewing 44; Rebs: Patrick Ewing 13; Asts: Maurice Cheeks 12
Series tied, 2–2

Madison Square Garden, New York City, New York
Attendance: 18,212
Referees: Dick Bavetta, Hugh Evans, Joe Forte

May 6

Boxscore

New York Knicks 121, Boston Celtics 114
Scoring by quarter: 24–32, 26–22, 37–29, 34–31
Pts: Patrick Ewing 31; Rebs: Charles Oakley 17; Asts: Patrick Ewing 10	Pts: Larry Bird 31; Rebs: Bird, Parish 9 each Asts: Dennis Johnson 10
New York wins series, 3–2

Boston Garden, Boston, Massachusetts
Attendance: 14,890
Referees: Darell Garretson, Mike Mathis, Jake O'Donnell

Regular-season series
Boston won 4–1 in the regular-season series

December 6, 1989

Recap

New York Knicks 98, Boston Celtics 113

Boston Garden, Boston

December 9, 1989

Recap

Boston Celtics 92, New York Knicks 124

Madison Square Garden, New York City

January 31, 1990

Recap

New York Knicks 91, Boston Celtics 97

Boston Garden, Boston

March 24, 1990

Recap

Boston Celtics 115, New York Knicks 110

Madison Square Garden, New York City

April 15, 1990

Recap

New York Knicks 94, Boston Celtics 101

Boston Garden, Boston

This was the 13th playoff meeting between these two teams, with the Celtics winning seven of the first 12 meetings.

Previous playoff series
Boston leads 7–5 in all-time playoff series

1951

Boston Celtics 0, New York Knicks 2

1951 Eastern Division Semifinals

1952

Boston Celtics 1, New York Knicks 2

1952 Eastern Division Semifinals

1953

Boston Celtics 1, New York Knicks 3

1953 Eastern Division Finals

1954

Boston Celtics 2, New York Knicks 0

1954 Eastern Division Round Robin Semifinals

1955

Boston Celtics 2, New York Knicks 1

1955 Eastern Division Semifinals

1967

Boston Celtics 3, New York Knicks 1

1967 Eastern Division Semifinals

1969

Boston Celtics 4, New York Knicks 2

1969 Eastern Division Finals

1972

Boston Celtics 1, New York Knicks 4

1972 Eastern Conference Finals

1973

Boston Celtics 3, New York Knicks 4

1973 Eastern Conference Finals

1974

Boston Celtics 4, New York Knicks 1

1974 Eastern Conference Finals

1984

Boston Celtics 4, New York Knicks 3

1984 Eastern Conference Semifinals

1988

Boston Celtics 3, New York Knicks 1

1988 Eastern Conference First Round

=== Western Conference first round ===
==== (1) Los Angeles Lakers vs. (8) Houston Rockets ====
April 27

Boxscore

Houston Rockets 89, Los Angeles Lakers 101
Scoring by quarter: 27–21, 22–22, 18–26, 22–32
Pts: Otis Thorpe 21; Rebs: Hakeem Olajuwon 14; Asts: Sleepy Floyd 8	Pts: James Worthy 34; Rebs: James Worthy 11; Asts: Magic Johnson 14
LA Lakers lead series, 1–0

Great Western Forum, Inglewood, California
Attendance: 17,505
Referees: Joe Crawford, Bob Delaney, Bennett Salvatore

April 29

Boxscore

Houston Rockets 100, Los Angeles Lakers 104
Scoring by quarter: 33–30, 32–18, 17–27, 18–29
Pts: Sleepy Floyd 27; Rebs: Hakeem Olajuwon 11; Asts: Sleepy Floyd 8	Pts: James Worthy 32; Rebs: Magic Johnson 7 Asts: Magic Johnson 14
LA Lakers lead series, 2–0

Great Western Forum, Inglewood, California
Attendance: 17,505
Referees: Dick Bavetta, Jake O'Donnell, Greg Willard

May 1

Boxscore

Los Angeles Lakers 108, Houston Rockets 114
Scoring by quarter: 30–31, 26–29, 34–32, 18–22
Pts: James Worthy 26; Rebs: Magic Johnson 8 Asts: Magic Johnson 18	Pts: Otis Thorpe 27; Rebs: Otis Thorpe 8 Asts: Sleepy Floyd 18
LA Lakers lead series, 2–1

The Summit, Houston, Texas
Attendance: 16,611
Referees: Joe Forte, Bernie Fryer, Darell Garretson

May 3

Boxscore

Los Angeles Lakers 109, Houston Rockets 88
Scoring by quarter: 27–25, 29–27, 24–23, 29–13
Pts: James Worthy 20; Rebs: James Worthy 7 Asts: Magic Johnson 8	Pts: Hakeem Olajuwon 28; Rebs: Hakeem Olajuwon 10; Asts: Sleepy Floyd 10
LA Lakers win series, 3–1

The Summit, Houston, Texas
Attendance: 16,611
Referees: Jim Clark, Bill Oakes, Earl Strom

Regular-season series
Tied 2–2 in the regular-season series

November 28, 1989

Recap

Los Angeles Lakers 104, Houston Rockets 110

The Summit, Houston, Texas

January 12, 1990

Recap

Houston Rockets 98, Los Angeles Lakers 107

Great Western Forum, Inglewood, California

March 6, 1990

Recap

Los Angeles Lakers 95, Houston Rockets 112

The Summit, Houston, Texas

April 15, 1990

Recap

Houston Rockets 102, Los Angeles Lakers 113

Great Western Forum, Inglewood, California

This was the third playoff meeting between these two teams, with the Rockets winning the first two meetings.

Previous playoff series
Houston leads 2–0 in all-time playoff series

1981

Houston Rockets 2, Los Angeles Lakers 1

1981 Western Conference First Round

1986

Houston Rockets 4, Los Angeles Lakers 1

1986 Western Conference Finals

==== (2) San Antonio Spurs vs. (7) Denver Nuggets ====
April 26

Boxscore

Denver Nuggets 103, San Antonio Spurs 119
Scoring by quarter: 22–28, 26–28, 21–25, 34–38
Pts: Todd Lichti 22; Rebs: Todd Lichti 13; Asts: Lichti, Adams 8 each	Pts: Willie Anderson 27; Rebs: David Robinson 13; Asts: Rod Strickland 9
San Antonio leads series, 1–0

HemisFair Arena, San Antonio, Texas
Attendance: 15,910
Referees: Jim Clark, Jack Nies, Earl Strom

April 28

Boxscore

Denver Nuggets 120, San Antonio Spurs 129
Scoring by quarter: 33–41, 29–26, 33–29, 25–33
Pts: Fat Lever 26; Rebs: Fat Lever 16; Asts: Fat Lever 9	Pts: David Robinson 31; Rebs: Terry Cummings 13; Asts: Rod Strickland 13
San Antonio leads series, 2–0

HemisFair Arena, San Antonio, Texas
Attendance: 15,910
Referees: Jess Kersey, Jack Madden, Ed Middleton

May 1

Boxscore

San Antonio Spurs 131, Denver Nuggets 120
Scoring by quarter: 31–27, 34–26, 32–35, 34–32
Pts: Terry Cummings 28; Rebs: David Robinson 16; Asts: Rod Strickland 9	Pts: Alex English 24; Rebs: Lever, Rasmussen 10 each Asts: Fat Lever 8
San Antonio wins series, 3–0

McNichols Sports Arena, Denver, Colorado
Attendance: 15,604
Referees: Steve Javie, Jake O'Donnell, Blane Reichelt

Regular-season series
San Antonio won 3–1 in the regular-season series

November 11, 1989

Recap

Denver Nuggets 108, San Antonio Spurs 122

HemisFair Arena, San Antonio

January 20, 1990

Recap

San Antonio Spurs 99, Denver Nuggets 126

McNichols Sports Arena, Denver, Colorado

March 10, 1990

Recap

Denver Nuggets 111, San Antonio Spurs 118

HemisFair Arena, San Antonio

April 20, 1990

Recap

San Antonio Spurs 112, Denver Nuggets 108

McNichols Sports Arena, Denver, Colorado

This was the third playoff meeting between these two teams, with each team winning one series apiece.

Previous playoff series
Tied 1–1 in all-time playoff series

1983

Denver Nuggets 1, San Antonio Spurs 4

1983 Western Conference Semifinals

1985

Denver Nuggets 3, San Antonio Spurs 2

1985 Western Conference First Round

==== (3) Portland Trail Blazers vs. (6) Dallas Mavericks ====
April 26

Boxscore

Dallas Mavericks 102, Portland Trail Blazers 109
Scoring by quarter: 28–28, 23–27, 16–22, 35–32
Pts: Derek Harper 24; Rebs: Roy Tarpley 14; Asts: Derek Harper 7	Pts: Terry Porter 28; Rebs: Buck Williams 16; Asts: Drexler, Porter 5 each
Portland leads series, 1–0

Memorial Coliseum, Portland, Oregon
Attendance: 12,884
Referees: Joe Crawford, Bob Delaney, Bennett Salvatore

April 28

Boxscore

Dallas Mavericks 107, Portland Trail Blazers 114
Scoring by quarter: 38–24, 27–39, 18–27, 24–24
Pts: Derek Harper 23; Rebs: Roy Tarpley 17; Asts: Rolando Blackman 5	Pts: Kevin Duckworth 18; Rebs: Buck Williams 13; Asts: Clyde Drexler 7
Portland leads series, 2–0

Memorial Coliseum, Portland, Oregon
Attendance: 12,884
Referees: Bruce Alexander, Hugh Evans, Hue Hollins

May 1

Boxscore

Portland Trail Blazers 106, Dallas Mavericks 92
Scoring by quarter: 34–28, 24–15, 18–26, 30–23
Pts: Jerome Kersey 29; Rebs: Buck Williams 10; Asts: Clyde Drexler 10	Pts: Rolando Blackman 23; Rebs: Roy Tarpley 15; Asts: Derek Harper 12
Portland wins series, 3–0

Reunion Arena, Dallas, Texas
Attendance: 17,007
Referees: Dan Crawford, Lee Jones, Mike Mathis

Regular-season series
Portland won 4–0 in the regular-season series

November 10, 1989

Recap

Portland Trail Blazers 99, Dallas Mavericks 91

Reunion Arena, Dallas

December 29, 1989

Recap

Portland Trail Blazers 144, Dallas Mavericks 140 (3OT)

Reunion Arena, Dallas

February 3, 1990

Recap

Dallas Mavericks 100, Portland Trail Blazers 131

Memorial Coliseum, Portland, Oregon

April 13, 1990

Recap

Dallas Mavericks 92, Portland Trail Blazers 124

Memorial Coliseum, Portland, Oregon

This was the second playoff meeting between these two teams, with the Trail Blazers winning the first meeting.

Previous playoff series
Portland leads 1–0 in all-time playoff series

1985

Dallas Mavericks 1, Portland Trail Blazers 3

1985 Western Conference First Round

==== (4) Utah Jazz vs. (5) Phoenix Suns ====
April 27

Boxscore

Phoenix Suns 96, Utah Jazz 113
Scoring by quarter: 24–27, 23–31, 20–25, 29–30
Pts: Dan Majerle 23; Rebs: Kurt Rambis 9 Asts: Jeff Hornacek 6	Pts: Karl Malone 21; Rebs: Karl Malone 11; Asts: John Stockton 17
Utah leads series, 1–0

Salt Palace, Salt Lake City, Utah
Attendance: 12,616
Referees: Dick Bavetta, Bernie Fryer, Jake O'Donnell

April 29

Boxscore

Phoenix Suns 105, Utah Jazz 87
Scoring by quarter: 33–21, 24–22, 25–21, 23–23
Pts: Kevin Johnson 22; Rebs: Mark West 21; Asts: Kevin Johnson 7	Pts: Karl Malone 20; Rebs: Karl Malone 10; Asts: John Stockton 8
Series tied, 1–1

Salt Palace, Salt Lake City, Utah
Attendance: 12,616
Referees: Hugh Evans, Hue Hollins, Steve Javie

May 2

Boxscore

Utah Jazz 105, Phoenix Suns 120
Scoring by quarter: 22–25, 33–31, 26–34, 24–30
Pts: Thurl Bailey 30; Rebs: Karl Malone 11; Asts: John Stockton 19	Pts: Kevin Johnson 29; Rebs: Mark West 10; Asts: Kevin Johnson 12
Phoenix leads series, 2–1

Arizona Veterans Memorial Coliseum, Phoenix, Arizona
Attendance: 14,487
Referees: Jess Kersey, Jack Madden, Bill Saar

May 4

Boxscore

Utah Jazz 105, Phoenix Suns 94
Scoring by quarter: 24–22, 25–26, 30–21, 26–25
Pts: Karl Malone 33; Rebs: Karl Malone 11; Asts: John Stockton 14	Pts: Eddie Johnson 33; Rebs: Mark West 11; Asts: Kevin Johnson 13
Series tied, 2–2

Arizona Veterans Memorial Coliseum, Phoenix, Arizona
Attendance: 14,487
Referees: Dan Crawford, Darell Garretson, Mike Mathis

May 6

Boxscore

Phoenix Suns 104, Utah Jazz 102
Scoring by quarter: 23–22, 26–31, 25–23, 30–26
Pts: Tom Chambers 32; Rebs: Mark West 11; Asts: Kevin Johnson 9	Pts: Bailey, Malone 26 each Rebs: Mark Eaton 9 Asts: John Stockton 17
Phoenix wins series, 3–2

Salt Palace, Salt Lake City, Utah
Attendance: 12,616
Referees: Joe Crawford, Bill Oakes, Ed T. Rush

- Kevin Johnson hits the series-winning shot with 8 tenths left.

Regular-season series
Phoenix won 3–1 in the regular-season series

December 13, 1989

Recap

Phoenix Suns 95, Utah Jazz 102

Salt Palace, Salt Lake City

February 14, 1990

Recap

Utah Jazz 103, Phoenix Suns 114

Arizona Veterans Memorial Coliseum, Phoenix, Arizona

March 13, 1990

Recap

Phoenix Suns 114, Utah Jazz 106

Salt Palace, Salt Lake City

April 9, 1990

Recap

Utah Jazz 115, Phoenix Suns 119 (OT)

Arizona Veterans Memorial Coliseum, Phoenix, Arizona

This was the second playoff meeting between these two teams, with the Suns winning the first meeting.

Previous playoff series
Phoenix leads 1–0 in all-time playoff series

1984

Phoenix Suns 4, Utah Jazz 2

1984 Western Conference Semifinals

== Conference semifinals ==
=== Eastern Conference semifinals ===
==== (1) Detroit Pistons vs. (5) New York Knicks ====
May 8

Boxscore

New York Knicks 77, Detroit Pistons 112
Scoring by quarter: 20–23, 18–26, 15–35, 24–28
Pts: Patrick Ewing 19; Rebs: Eddie Lee Wilkins 8 Asts: Maurice Cheeks 6	Pts: Isiah Thomas 21; Rebs: Bill Laimbeer 13; Asts: Isiah Thomas 7
Detroit leads series, 1–0

The Palace of Auburn Hills, Auburn Hills, Michigan
Attendance: 21,454
Referees: Joe Crawford, Bob Delaney, Bill Oakes

May 10

Boxscore

New York Knicks 97, Detroit Pistons 104
Scoring by quarter: 28–24, 26–34, 24–23, 19–23
Pts: Gerald Wilkins 24; Rebs: Charles Oakley 15; Asts: Maurice Cheeks 8	Pts: James Edwards 32; Rebs: Bill Laimbeer 13; Asts: Isiah Thomas 12
Detroit leads series, 2–0

The Palace of Auburn Hills, Auburn Hills, Michigan
Attendance: 21,454
Referees: Hue Hollins, Jack Nies, Earl Strom

May 12

Boxscore

Detroit Pistons 103, New York Knicks 111
Scoring by quarter: 27–34, 28–28, 22–20, 26–29
Pts: Isiah Thomas 20; Rebs: Dennis Rodman 8 Asts: Isiah Thomas 6	Pts: Patrick Ewing 45; Rebs: Charles Oakley 20; Asts: Maurice Cheeks 12
Detroit leads series, 2–1

Madison Square Garden, New York City, New York
Attendance: 18,212
Referees: Dan Crawford, Bernie Fryer, Darell Garretson

May 13

Boxscore

Detroit Pistons 102, New York Knicks 90
Scoring by quarter: 27–23, 24–19, 23–21, 28–27
Pts: James Edwards 19; Rebs: Dennis Rodman 14; Asts: Isiah Thomas 11	Pts: Patrick Ewing 30; Rebs: Charles Oakley 14; Asts: Cheeks, Jackson 6 each
Detroit leads series, 3–1

Madison Square Garden, New York City, New York
Attendance: 18,212
Referees: Jack Madden, Mike Mathis, Bennett Salvatore

May 15

Boxscore

New York Knicks 84, Detroit Pistons 95
Scoring by quarter: 28–20, 21–31, 14–18, 21–26
Pts: Patrick Ewing 22; Rebs: Patrick Ewing 14; Asts: Maurice Cheeks 9	Pts: Mark Aguirre 25; Rebs: Dennis Rodman 11; Asts: Isiah Thomas 6
Detroit wins series, 4–1

The Palace of Auburn Hills, Auburn Hills, Michigan
Attendance: 21,454
Referees: Dick Bavetta, Steve Javie, Ed T. Rush

Regular-season series
Detroit won 4–0 in the regular-season series

November 3, 1989

Recap

New York Knicks 103, Detroit Pistons 106

The Palace of Auburn Hills, Auburn Hills, Michigan

January 6, 1990

Recap

New York Knicks 106, Detroit Pistons 117

The Palace of Auburn Hills, Auburn Hills, Michigan

February 25, 1990

Recap

Detroit Pistons 98, New York Knicks 87

Madison Square Garden, New York City

April 10, 1990

Recap

Detroit Pistons 108, New York Knicks 98

Madison Square Garden, New York City

This was the second playoff meeting between these two teams, with the Knicks winning the first meeting.

Previous playoff series
New York leads 1–0 in all-time playoff series

1984

Detroit Pistons 2, New York Knicks 3

1984 Eastern Conference First Round

==== (2) Philadelphia 76ers vs. (3) Chicago Bulls ====
May 7

Boxscore

Philadelphia 76ers 85, Chicago Bulls 96
Scoring by quarter: 21–33, 26–20, 18–20, 20–23
Pts: Charles Barkley 30; Rebs: Charles Barkley 20; Asts: three players 4 each	Pts: Michael Jordan 39; Rebs: Horace Grant 12; Asts: Scottie Pippen 12
Chicago leads series, 1–0

Chicago Stadium, Chicago, Illinois
Attendance: 18,676
Referees: Hugh Evans, Joe Forte, Bill Saar

May 9

Boxscore

Philadelphia 76ers 96, Chicago Bulls 101
Scoring by quarter: 30–25, 27–21, 20–32, 19–23
Pts: Hersey Hawkins 23; Rebs: Charles Barkley 19; Asts: Johnny Dawkins 13	Pts: Michael Jordan 45; Rebs: Grant, Pippen 9 each Asts: Michael Jordan 7
Chicago leads series, 2–0

Chicago Stadium, Chicago, Illinois
Attendance: 18,676
Referees: Darell Garretson, Mike Mathis, Tommy Nunez Sr.

May 11

Boxscore

Chicago Bulls 112, Philadelphia 76ers 118
Scoring by quarter: 14–33, 27–30, 26–24, 45–31
Pts: Michael Jordan 49; Rebs: Ed Nealy 7 Asts: B. J. Armstrong 7	Pts: Charles Barkley 34; Rebs: Charles Barkley 20; Asts: Charles Barkley 8
Chicago leads series, 2–1

Spectrum, Philadelphia, Pennsylvania
Attendance: 18,168
Referees: Dan Crawford, Hue Hollins, Bennett Salvatore

May 13

Boxscore

Chicago Bulls 111, Philadelphia 76ers 101
Scoring by quarter: 26–30, 24–25, 27–31, 34–15
Pts: Michael Jordan 45; Rebs: Grant, Nealy 9 each Asts: Michael Jordan 11	Pts: Hersey Hawkins 26; Rebs: Charles Barkley 13; Asts: Hersey Hawkins 6
Chicago leads series, 3–1

Spectrum, Philadelphia, Pennsylvania
Attendance: 18,168
Referees: Jack Nies, Bill Oakes, Earl Strom

May 16

Boxscore

Philadelphia 76ers 99, Chicago Bulls 117
Scoring by quarter: 31–28, 32–34, 18–27, 18–28
Pts: Ron Anderson 20; Rebs: Charles Barkley 13; Asts: Johnny Dawkins 15	Pts: Michael Jordan 37; Rebs: Michael Jordan 9 Asts: John Paxson 9
Chicago wins series, 4–1

Chicago Stadium, Chicago, Illinois
Attendance: 18,676
Referees: Jess Kersey, Jack Madden, Paul Mihalak

Regular-season series
Tied 2–2 in the regular-season series

December 9, 1989

Recap

Philadelphia 76ers 105, Chicago Bulls 125

Chicago Stadium, Chicago, Illinois

December 23, 1989

Recap

Chicago Bulls 104, Philadelphia 76ers 131

Spectrum, Philadelphia

January 26, 1990

Recap

Chicago Bulls 109, Philadelphia 76ers 120

Spectrum, Philadelphia

March 17, 1990

Recap

Philadelphia 76ers 109, Chicago Bulls 114

Chicago Stadium, Chicago, Illinois

This was the first playoff meeting between the Bulls and the 76ers.

=== Western Conference semifinals ===
==== (1) Los Angeles Lakers vs. (5) Phoenix Suns ====
May 8

Boxscore

Phoenix Suns 104, Los Angeles Lakers 102
Scoring by quarter: 31–26, 22–25, 25–33, 26–18
Pts: Tom Chambers 26; Rebs: Mark West 16; Asts: Kevin Johnson 12	Pts: M. Johnson, Worthy 22 each Rebs: A.C. Green 13; Asts: Magic Johnson 14
Phoenix leads series, 1–0

Great Western Forum, Inglewood, California
Attendance: 17,506
Referees: Bernie Fryer, Jack Madden, Wally Rooney

- This was Phoenix's first win at Great Western Forum in 22 attempts, dating back to Game 5 of the 1984 Western Conference Finals on May 23 of that year.

May 10

Boxscore

Phoenix Suns 100, Los Angeles Lakers 124
Scoring by quarter: 20–33, 28–30, 25–34, 27–27
Pts: Jeff Hornacek 18; Rebs: five players 5 each Asts: Kevin Johnson 12	Pts: James Worthy 27; Rebs: A.C. Green 13; Asts: Magic Johnson 14
Series tied, 1–1

Great Western Forum, Inglewood, California
Attendance: 17,505
Referees: Dick Bavetta, Hugh Evans, Steve Javie

May 12

Boxscore

Los Angeles Lakers 103, Phoenix Suns 117
Scoring by quarter: 29–26, 20–25, 25–37, 29–29
Pts: James Worthy 27; Rebs: A.C. Green 10; Asts: Magic Johnson 16	Pts: Tom Chambers 34; Rebs: Chambers, K. Johnson 7 each Asts: Kevin Johnson 8
Phoenix leads series, 2–1

Arizona Veterans Memorial Coliseum, Phoenix, Arizona
Attendance: 14,487
Referees: Jess Kersey, Paul Mihalak, Ed T. Rush

May 13

Boxscore

Los Angeles Lakers 101, Phoenix Suns 114
Scoring by quarter: 22–36, 26–26, 31–22, 22–30
Pts: Magic Johnson 43; Rebs: A.C. Green 18; Asts: Magic Johnson 10	Pts: Kevin Johnson 30; Rebs: Mark West 15; Asts: Kevin Johnson 16
Phoenix leads series, 3–1

Arizona Veterans Memorial Coliseum, Phoenix, Arizona
Attendance: 14,487
Referees: Jim Clark, Joe Forte, Jake O'Donnell

May 15

Boxscore

Phoenix Suns 106, Los Angeles Lakers 103
Scoring by quarter: 20–35, 33–26, 24–19, 29–23
Pts: Kevin Johnson 37; Rebs: Mark West 16; Asts: Kevin Johnson 8	Pts: Magic Johnson 43; Rebs: M. Johnson, Divac 8 each Asts: Magic Johnson 7
Phoenix wins series, 4–1

Great Western Forum, Inglewood, California
Attendance: 17,505
Referees: Joe Crawford, Jack Nies, Bill Oakes

- Michael Cooper's final NBA game.

Regular-season series
Los Angeles won 3–1 in the regular-season series

November 7, 1989

Recap

Phoenix Suns 107, Los Angeles Lakers 111

Great Western Forum, Inglewood, California

December 7, 1989

Recap

Phoenix Suns 96, Los Angeles Lakers 100

Great Western Forum, Inglewood, California

January 9, 1990

Recap

Los Angeles Lakers 118, Phoenix Suns 121 (OT)

Arizona Veterans Memorial Coliseum, Phoenix, Arizona

April 6, 1990

Recap

Los Angeles Lakers 103, Phoenix Suns 99

Arizona Veterans Memorial Coliseum, Phoenix, Arizona

This was the seventh playoff meeting between these two teams, with the Lakers winning the first six meetings.

Previous playoff series
Los Angeles leads 6–0 in all-time playoff series

1970

Los Angeles Lakers 4, Phoenix Suns 3

1970 Western Division Semifinals

1980

Los Angeles Lakers 4, Phoenix Suns 1

1980 Western Conference Semifinals

1982

Los Angeles Lakers 4, Phoenix Suns 0

1982 Western Conference Semifinals

1984

Los Angeles Lakers 4, Phoenix Suns 2

1984 Western Conference Finals

1985

Los Angeles Lakers 3, Phoenix Suns 0

1985 Western Conference First Round

1989

Los Angeles Lakers 4, Phoenix Suns 0

1989 Western Conference Finals

==== (2) San Antonio Spurs vs. (3) Portland Trail Blazers ====
May 5

Boxscore

San Antonio Spurs 94, Portland Trail Blazers 107
Scoring by quarter: 22–31, 30–21, 22–26, 20–29
Pts: Frank Brickowski 20; Rebs: David Robinson 9 Asts: Rod Strickland 9	Pts: Jerome Kersey 25; Rebs: Jerome Kersey 16; Asts: Clyde Drexler 11
Portland leads series, 1–0

Memorial Coliseum, Portland, Oregon
Attendance: 12,884
Referees: Tommy Nunez Sr., Wally Rooney, Earl Strom

May 8

Boxscore

San Antonio Spurs 112, Portland Trail Blazers 122
Scoring by quarter: 27–27, 28–36, 22–34, 35–25
Pts: Terry Cummings 33; Rebs: David Robinson 8 Asts: Rod Strickland 14	Pts: Terry Porter 27; Rebs: Buck Williams 8 Asts: Clyde Drexler 8
Portland leads series, 2–0

Memorial Coliseum, Portland, Oregon
Attendance: 12,884
Referees: Dan Crawford, Ron Garretson, Ed T. Rush

May 10

Boxscore

Portland Trail Blazers 98, San Antonio Spurs 121
Scoring by quarter: 22–27, 23–34, 27–25, 26–35
Pts: Porter, Williams 18 each Rebs: Clifford Robinson 8 Asts: Clyde Drexler 9	Pts: David Robinson 28; Rebs: Strickland, Cummings 9 each Asts: Rod Strickland 17
Portland leads series, 2–1

HemisFair Arena, San Antonio, Texas
Attendance: 15,910
Referees: Lee Jones, Jess Kersey, Jack Madden

May 12

Boxscore

Portland Trail Blazers 105, San Antonio Spurs 115
Scoring by quarter: 33–25, 18–37, 20–24, 34–29
Pts: Clyde Drexler 27; Rebs: Buck Williams 10; Asts: Clyde Drexler 7	Pts: Terry Cummings 35; Rebs: Terry Cummings 11; Asts: Rod Strickland 14
Series tied, 2–2

HemisFair Arena, San Antonio, Texas
Attendance: 15,910
Referees: Dick Bavetta, Hugh Evans, Steve Javie

May 15

Boxscore

San Antonio Spurs 132, Portland Trail Blazers 138 (2OT)
Scoring by quarter: 27–41, 26–31, 34–27, 32–20, Overtime: 7–7, 6–12
Pts: Terry Cummings 32; Rebs: David Robinson 15; Asts: Rod Strickland 7	Pts: Terry Porter 38; Rebs: Kersey, Williams 10 each Asts: Clyde Drexler 9
Portland leads series, 3–2

Memorial Coliseum, Portland, Oregon
Attendance: 12,884
Referees: Joe Forte, Hue Hollins, Jake O'Donnell

May 17

Boxscore

Portland Trail Blazers 97, San Antonio Spurs 112
Scoring by quarter: 27–26, 14–26, 24–25, 32–35
Pts: Jerome Kersey 22; Rebs: Buck Williams 10; Asts: Clyde Drexler 7	Pts: Willie Anderson 30; Rebs: David Robinson 13; Asts: Rod Strickland 12
Series tied, 3–3

HemisFair Arena, San Antonio, Texas
Attendance: 15,910
Referees: Dan Crawford, Darell Garretson, Mike Mathis

May 19

Boxscore

San Antonio Spurs 105, Portland Trail Blazers 108 (OT)
Scoring by quarter: 24–31, 22–21, 26–21, 25–24, Overtime: 8–11
Pts: Terry Cummings 27; Rebs: David Robinson 16; Asts: Rod Strickland 8	Pts: Terry Porter 36; Rebs: Williams, Kersey 15 each Asts: Terry Porter 9
Portland wins series, 4–3

Memorial Coliseum, Portland, Oregon
Attendance: 12,884
Referees: Joe Crawford, Hugh Evans, Ed T. Rush

Regular-season series
Portland won 3–1 in the regular-season series

November 8, 1989

Recap

Portland Trail Blazers 108, San Antonio Spurs 104

HemisFair Arena, San Antonio

January 26, 1990

Recap

San Antonio Spurs 103, Portland Trail Blazers 109

Memorial Coliseum, Portland, Oregon

March 22, 1990

Recap

Portland Trail Blazers 106, San Antonio Spurs 107

HemisFair Arena, San Antonio

April 8, 1990

Recap

San Antonio Spurs 105, Portland Trail Blazers 112

Memorial Coliseum, Portland, Oregon

This was the first playoff meeting between the Spurs and the Trail Blazers.

== Conference finals ==
=== Eastern Conference finals ===
==== (1) Detroit Pistons vs. (3) Chicago Bulls ====
May 20

Boxscore

Chicago Bulls 77, Detroit Pistons 86
Scoring by quarter: 22–24, 21–15, 17–28, 17–19
Pts: Michael Jordan 34; Rebs: Horace Grant 9 Asts: Michael Jordan 5	Pts: Joe Dumars 27; Rebs: Dennis Rodman 13; Asts: Isiah Thomas 6
Detroit leads series, 1–0

The Palace of Auburn Hills, Auburn Hills, Michigan
Attendance: 21,454
Referees: Bill Oakes, Jake O'Donnell, Wally Rooney

May 22

Boxscore

Chicago Bulls 93, Detroit Pistons 102
Scoring by quarter: 18–27, 20–26, 31–21, 24–28
Pts: Michael Jordan 20; Rebs: Horace Grant 9 Asts: Michael Jordan 7	Pts: Joe Dumars 31; Rebs: Laimbeer, Johnson 8 each Asts: Thomas, Johnson 7 each
Detroit leads series, 2–0

The Palace of Auburn Hills, Auburn Hills, Michigan
Attendance: 21,454
Referees: Dan Crawford, Darell Garretson, Hue Hollins

May 26

Boxscore

Detroit Pistons 102, Chicago Bulls 107
Scoring by quarter: 19–24, 32–19, 26–33, 25–31
Pts: Isiah Thomas 36; Rebs: Bill Laimbeer 8 Asts: Isiah Thomas 8	Pts: Michael Jordan 47; Rebs: Pippen, Grant 11 each Asts: Scottie Pippen 5
Detroit leads series, 2–1

Chicago Stadium, Chicago, Illinois
Attendance: 18,676
Referees: Dick Bavetta, Joe Crawford, Bernie Fryer

May 28

Boxscore

Detroit Pistons 101, Chicago Bulls 108
Scoring by quarter: 16–28, 19–23, 33–20, 33–37
Pts: Isiah Thomas 26; Rebs: Dennis Rodman 20; Asts: Isiah Thomas 8	Pts: Michael Jordan 42; Rebs: Horace Grant 13; Asts: Michael Jordan 9
Series tied, 2–2

Chicago Stadium, Chicago, Illinois
Attendance: 18,676
Referees: Jess Kersey, Jack Nies, Earl Strom

May 30

Boxscore

Chicago Bulls 83, Detroit Pistons 97
Scoring by quarter: 25–25, 16–21, 23–26, 19–25
Pts: Michael Jordan 22; Rebs: Horace Grant 12; Asts: Michael Jordan 8	Pts: Joe Dumars 20; Rebs: John Salley 10; Asts: Isiah Thomas 10
Detroit leads series, 3–2

The Palace of Auburn Hills, Auburn Hills, Michigan
Attendance: 21,454
Referees: Hugh Evans, Jack Madden, Ed T. Rush

June 1

Boxscore

Detroit Pistons 91, Chicago Bulls 109
Scoring by quarter: 20–21, 24–26, 19–33, 28–29
Pts: Joe Dumars 23; Rebs: Rodman, Laimbeer 8 each Asts: Isiah Thomas 10	Pts: Michael Jordan 29; Rebs: Horace Grant 14; Asts: Pippen, Grant 5 each
Series tied, 3–3

Chicago Stadium, Chicago, Illinois
Attendance: 18,676
Referees: Darell Garretson, Hue Hollins, Mike Mathis

June 3

Boxscore

Chicago Bulls 74, Detroit Pistons 93
Scoring by quarter: 19–17, 14–31, 26–21, 15–24
Pts: Michael Jordan 33; Rebs: Horace Grant 14; Asts: Michael Jordan 9	Pts: Isiah Thomas 21; Rebs: Mark Aguirre 10; Asts: Isiah Thomas 11
Detroit wins series, 4–3

The Palace of Auburn Hills, Auburn Hills, Michigan
Attendance: 21,454
Referees: Joe Crawford, Jake O'Donnell, Earl Strom

Regular-season series
Detroit won 4–1 in the regular-season series

November 7, 1989

Recap

Detroit Pistons 114, Chicago Bulls 117

Chicago Stadium, Chicago, Illinois

January 9, 1990

Recap

Chicago Bulls 90, Detroit Pistons 100

The Palace of Auburn Hills, Auburn Hills, Michigan

January 23, 1990

Recap

Detroit Pistons 107, Chicago Bulls 95

Chicago Stadium, Chicago, Illinois

March 16, 1990

Recap

Detroit Pistons 106, Chicago Bulls 81

Chicago Stadium, Chicago, Illinois

April 22, 1990

Recap

Chicago Bulls 106, Detroit Pistons 111

The Palace of Auburn Hills, Auburn Hills, Michigan

This was the fourth playoff meeting between these two teams, with the Pistons winning two of the first three meetings.

Previous playoff series
Detroit leads 2–1 in all-time playoff series

1974

Chicago Bulls 4, Detroit Pistons 3

1974 Western Conference Semifinals

1988

Chicago Bulls 1, Detroit Pistons 4

1988 Eastern Conference Semifinals

1989

Chicago Bulls 2, Detroit Pistons 4

1989 Eastern Conference Finals

=== Western Conference finals ===
==== (3) Portland Trail Blazers vs. (5) Phoenix Suns ====
May 21

Boxscore

Phoenix Suns 98, Portland Trail Blazers 100
Scoring by quarter: 26–24, 22–26, 32–34, 18–16
Pts: Tom Chambers 29; Rebs: Mark West 12; Asts: Kevin Johnson 11	Pts: Clyde Drexler 20; Rebs: Jerome Kersey 11; Asts: Terry Porter 9
Portland leads series, 1–0

Memorial Coliseum, Portland, Oregon
Attendance: 12,884
Referees: Dick Bavetta, Jack Nies, Earl Strom

- Kevin Duckworth hits the game-winner with 17.3 seconds left.

May 23

Boxscore

Phoenix Suns 107, Portland Trail Blazers 108
Scoring by quarter: 28–17, 31–24, 32–41, 16–26
Pts: Tom Chambers 28; Rebs: Tom Chambers 14; Asts: Kevin Johnson 8	Pts: Jerome Kersey 29; Rebs: Jerome Kersey 11; Asts: Clyde Drexler 6
Portland leads series, 2–0

Memorial Coliseum, Portland, Oregon
Attendance: 12,884
Referees: Jess Kersey, Jack Madden, Paul Mihalak

- Terry Porter hits the game-winner with 12.7 seconds left.

May 25

Boxscore

Portland Trail Blazers 89, Phoenix Suns 123
Scoring by quarter: 18–40, 25–31, 17–32, 29–20
Pts: Jerome Kersey 16; Rebs: Mark Bryant 7 Asts: Clyde Drexler 6	Pts: Tom Chambers 24; Rebs: Andrew Lang 10; Asts: Kevin Johnson 12
Portland leads series, 2–1

Arizona Veterans Memorial Coliseum, Phoenix, Arizona
Attendance: 14,487
Referees: Hugh Evans, Hue Hollins, Steve Javie

May 27

Boxscore

Portland Trail Blazers 107, Phoenix Suns 119
Scoring by quarter: 28–27, 22–29, 26–33, 31–30
Pts: Jerome Kersey 29; Rebs: Buck Williams 8 Asts: Terry Porter 12	Pts: Kevin Johnson 28; Rebs: Mark West 12; Asts: Kevin Johnson 17
Series tied, 2–2

Arizona Veterans Memorial Coliseum, Phoenix, Arizona
Attendance: 14,487
Referees: Dan Crawford, Mike Mathis, Ed T. Rush

May 29

Boxscore

Phoenix Suns 114, Portland Trail Blazers 120
Scoring by quarter: 24–31, 33–33, 27–27, 30–29
Pts: Kevin Johnson 28; Rebs: Tom Chambers 13; Asts: Kevin Johnson 14	Pts: Clyde Drexler 32; Rebs: Jerome Kersey 11; Asts: Terry Porter 12
Portland leads series, 3–2

Memorial Coliseum, Portland, Oregon
Attendance: 12,884
Referees: Joe Crawford, Darell Garretson, Bill Oakes

May 31

Boxscore

Portland Trail Blazers 112, Phoenix Suns 109
Scoring by quarter: 31–34, 28–29, 25–26, 28–20
Pts: Drexler, Porter 23 each Rebs: Buck Williams 11; Asts: Drexler, Porter 7 each	Pts: Jeff Hornacek 36; Rebs: Kurt Rambis 12; Asts: Hornacek, Johnson 6 each
Portland wins series, 4–2

Arizona Veterans Memorial Coliseum, Phoenix, Arizona
Attendance: 14,487
Referees: Dick Bavetta, Jess Kersey, Jake O'Donnell

Regular-season series
Portland won 3–2 in the regular-season series

November 15, 1989

Recap

Portland Trail Blazers 107, Phoenix Suns 109

Arizona Veterans Memorial Coliseum, Phoenix, Arizona

November 17, 1989

Recap

Phoenix Suns 109, Portland Trail Blazers 110

Memorial Coliseum, Portland, Oregon

December 26, 1989

Recap

Portland Trail Blazers 105, Phoenix Suns 121

Arizona Veterans Memorial Coliseum, Phoenix, Arizona

February 4, 1990

Recap

Phoenix Suns 121, Portland Trail Blazers 123

Memorial Coliseum, Portland, Oregon

April 18, 1990

Recap

Portland Trail Blazers 128, Phoenix Suns 120 (OT)

Arizona Veterans Memorial Coliseum, Phoenix, Arizona

This was the third playoff meeting between these two teams, with the Suns winning the first two meetings.

Previous playoff series
Phoenix leads 2–0 in all-time playoff series

1979

Phoenix Suns 2, Portland Trail Blazers 1

1979 Western Conference First Round

1984

Phoenix Suns 3, Portland Trail Blazers 2

1984 Western Conference First Round

== NBA Finals: (E1) Detroit Pistons vs. (W3) Portland Trail Blazers ==
June 5

Boxscore

Portland Trail Blazers 99, Detroit Pistons 105
Scoring by quarter: 33–24, 19–23, 28–29, 19–29
Pts: Clyde Drexler 21; Rebs: Buck Williams 12; Asts: Terry Porter 8	Pts: Isiah Thomas 33; Rebs: Bill Laimbeer 15; Asts: Isiah Thomas 6
Detroit leads series, 1–0

The Palace of Auburn Hills, Auburn Hills, Michigan
Attendance: 21,454
Referees: Hugh Evans, Ed T. Rush, Dick Bavetta

June 7

Boxscore

Portland Trail Blazers 106, Detroit Pistons 105 (OT)
Scoring by quarter: 23–30, 30–15, 22–24, 19–25, Overtime: 12–11
Pts: Clyde Drexler 33; Rebs: Buck Williams 12; Asts: Terry Porter 10	Pts: Edwards, Laimbeer 26 each Rebs: Bill Laimbeer 11; Asts: Isiah Thomas 11
Series tied, 1–1

The Palace of Auburn Hills, Auburn Hills, Michigan
Attendance: 21,454
Referees: Darell Garretson, Jack Madden, Hue Hollins

- Terry Porter hits the game-tying free throws with 10.2 seconds left in regulation to force OT; Clyde Drexler hits the game-winning free throws with 2.1 seconds left in OT.

June 10

Boxscore

Detroit Pistons 121, Portland Trail Blazers 106
Scoring by quarter: 31–27, 27–24, 32–31, 31–24
Pts: Joe Dumars 33; Rebs: Bill Laimbeer 12; Asts: Isiah Thomas 8	Pts: Jerome Kersey 27; Rebs: Clyde Drexler 13; Asts: Terry Porter 9
Detroit leads series, 2–1

Memorial Coliseum, Portland, Oregon
Attendance: 12,884
Referees: Jake O'Donnell, Jess Kersey, Joe Crawford

- This was Detroit's first win in Portland since October 19, 1974, the second game of Bill Walton's career.

June 12

Boxscore

Detroit Pistons 112, Portland Trail Blazers 109
Scoring by quarter: 22–32, 29–14, 32–27, 29–36
Pts: Isiah Thomas 32; Rebs: Bill Laimbeer 12; Asts: Isiah Thomas 5	Pts: Clyde Drexler 34; Rebs: Drexler, Kersey 8 each Asts: Clyde Drexler 10
Detroit leads series, 3–1

Memorial Coliseum, Portland, Oregon
Attendance: 12,642
Referees: Hugh Evans, Mike Mathis, Earl Strom

- Danny Young's buzzer beater is, correctly, disqualified by Earl Strom.
- Final NBA game officiated by Earl Strom.

June 14

Boxscore

Detroit Pistons 92, Portland Trail Blazers 90
Scoring by quarter: 26–22, 20–20, 19–27, 27–21
Pts: Isiah Thomas 29; Rebs: Bill Laimbeer 17; Asts: Joe Dumars 7	Pts: Duckworth, Porter 21 each Rebs: Jerome Kersey 9 Asts: Terry Porter 9
Detroit wins series, 4–1

Memorial Coliseum, Portland, Oregon
Attendance: 12,642
Referees: Darell Garretson, Jack Madden, Ed T. Rush

- Vinnie Johnson hits the title-winning shot with 0.7 seconds left, capping off a 9–0 run in the final two minutes.
- Final NBA game aired on CBS.

Regular-season series
Tied 1–1 in the regular-season series

November 26, 1989

Recap

Detroit Pistons 82, Portland Trail Blazers 102

Memorial Coliseum, Portland, Oregon

January 13, 1990

Recap

Portland Trail Blazers 106, Detroit Pistons 111

The Palace of Auburn Hills, Auburn Hills, Michigan

This was the first playoff meeting between the Pistons and the Trail Blazers.

== Statistical leaders ==
Category	Game high			Average			
Category	Player	Team	High	Player	Team	Avg.	GP
Points	Michael Jordan	Chicago Bulls	49	Michael Jordan	Chicago Bulls	36.7	16
Rebounds	Mark West; Charles Barkley	Phoenix Suns; Philadelphia 76ers	21	Charles Barkley	Philadelphia 76ers	15.5	10
Assists	John Stockton	Utah Jazz	19	John Stockton	Utah Jazz	15.0	5
Steals	Patrick Ewing	New York Knicks	7	Michael Jordan	Chicago Bulls	2.8	16
Blocks	Hakeem Olajuwon	Houston Rockets	10	Hakeem Olajuwon	Houston Rockets	5.8	4
