= List of Chicago Bulls seasons =

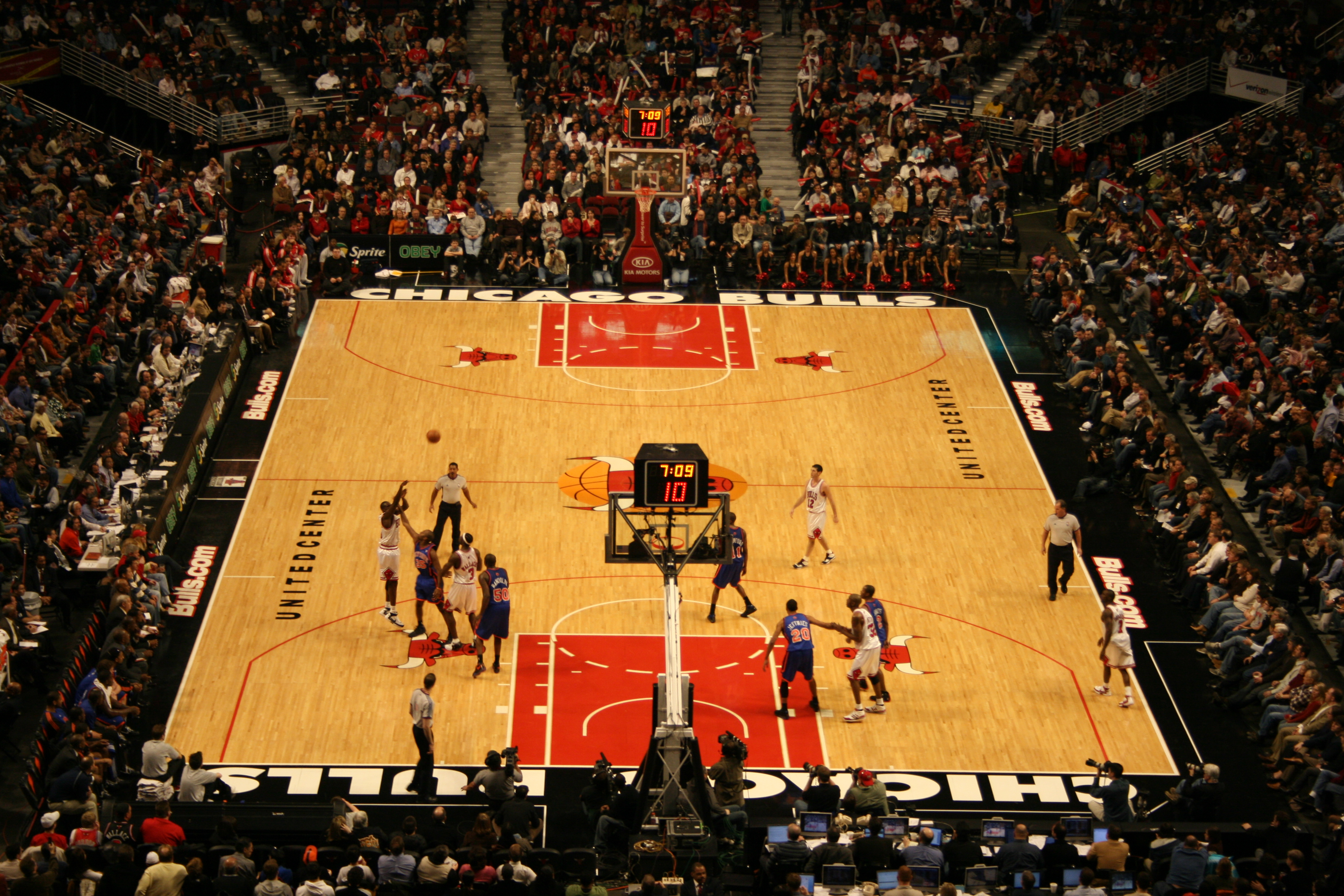
The United Center has been home to the Bulls since 1994.

The Chicago Bulls are a National Basketball Association (NBA) team based in Chicago, Illinois. Dick Klein founded the Bulls in 1966 after a number of other professional basketball teams in Chicago had failed. (Note: The Bulls' predecessors included the Chicago Bruins, the Chicago Studebaker Flyers, the Chicago American Gears, the Chicago Stags, the Chicago Majors, and the Chicago Packers (later renamed the Zephyrs). The Zephyrs moved to Baltimore and then Washington, D.C., and are now known as the Washington Wizards.) In their 60 seasons, the Bulls have achieved a winning record 26 times, and have appeared in the NBA playoffs 36 times. They received international recognition in the 1990s when All-Star shooting guard Michael Jordan led them to their six league championships. The only three NBA franchises that have won more championships than the Bulls are the Boston Celtics with 18 championships, the Los Angeles Lakers with 17, and the Golden State Warriors with 7. The Bulls are the only NBA franchise as of 2026 to have a combination of multiple championships and zero losses in the NBA Finals.

The Bulls initially competed in the NBA's Western Division. The Western Division was renamed the Western Conference in 1970, and was split into the Midwest and Pacific Divisions. The Bulls played in the Midwest Division until 1980, when they moved to the Central Division of the Eastern Conference.

== History of the Bulls ==
=== Early years ===
During their inaugural season (1966–67), the Bulls compiled a 33–48 record under coach Johnny "Red" Kerr and reached the playoffs. This was the best record achieved by an NBA expansion team in its first year of play, a feat which earned Kerr the NBA Coach of the Year Award. Dick Motta replaced Kerr in 1969, and under his leadership, the Bulls appeared in the playoffs every year from 1970 to 1975. The team reached the Western Conference finals in 1974 and 1975, but lost to the Milwaukee Bucks and Golden State Warriors, respectively. Key players during the Motta era included Jerry Sloan, Bob Love, Chet Walker, Norm Van Lier, and Tom Boerwinkle. Revered basketball writer Bob Ryan wrote that Sloan and Van Lier comprised the "physically and mentally toughest NBA backcourt" he ever saw.

The Bulls qualified for the playoffs just twice between 1976 and 1984, a period in which the team used eight different head coaches, including former player Jerry Sloan. They had a chance to win the first pick of the 1979 NBA draft, which would have allowed them to select future Hall of Famer Magic Johnson. However, they lost a coin flip to the Los Angeles Lakers, and went on to choose David Greenwood with the second pick. Although Greenwood averaged 12.6 points over six seasons with the Bulls, he never became an NBA All-Star. During this period the Bulls were perhaps best known for being led by former-ABA star Artis Gilmore and Reggie Theus, both of whom were multiple time All-Stars with the Bulls.

=== Jordan era ===
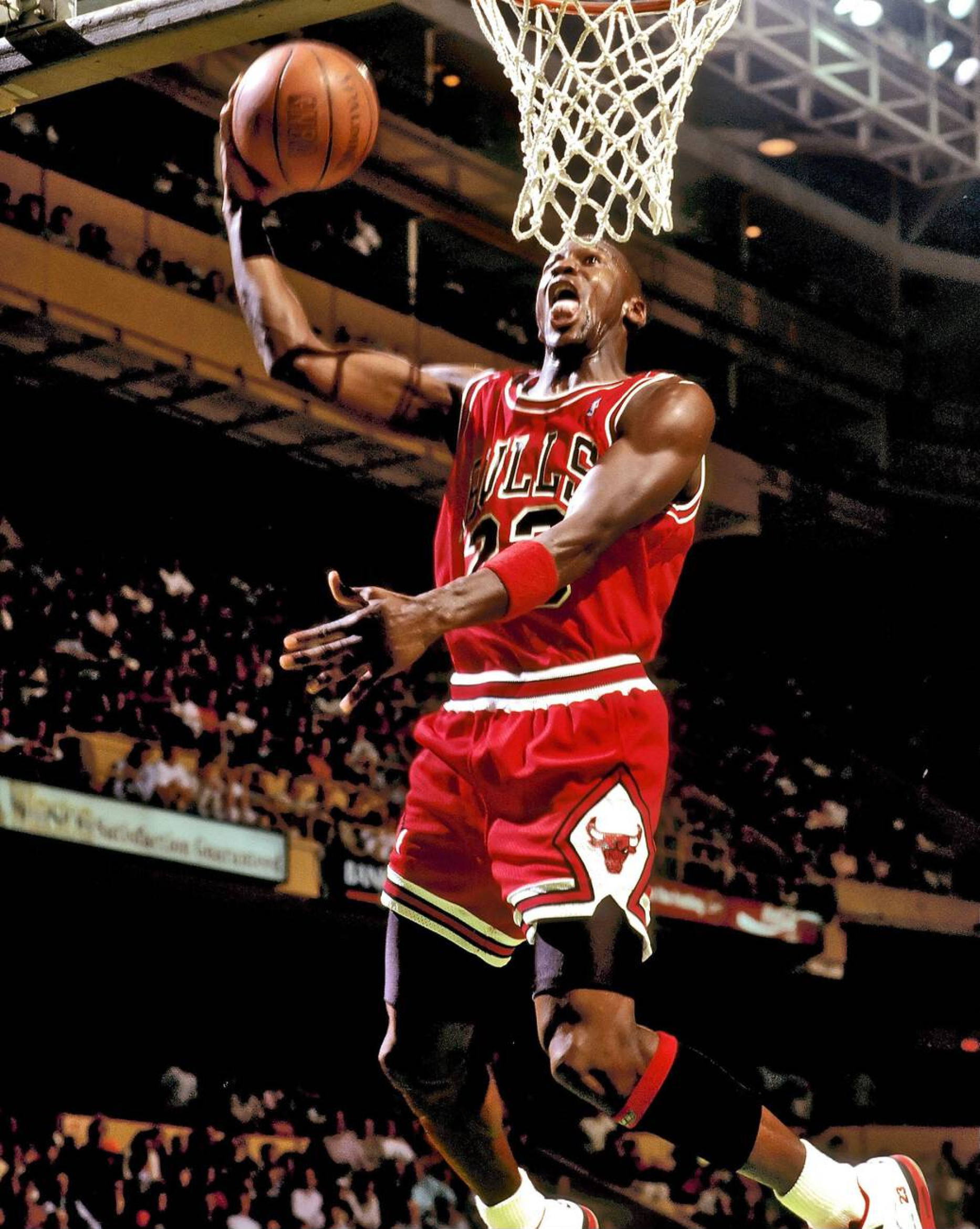
Michael Jordan won 6 championships with the Chicago Bulls.

The Bulls' luck turned for the better after selecting Michael Jordan with the third overall pick in the 1984 NBA draft. Considered the greatest basketball player of all time by NBA.com, Jordan averaged 28.2 points per game during his first season and received the 1985 NBA Rookie of the Year Award. From 1985 onwards, the Bulls reached the playoffs every season he was on the team's roster despite having had a losing record in each of his first three years. Jordan could not lead the Bulls past the first round of the playoffs by himself losing to the champion Celtics and in 1987 general manager Jerry Krause acquired Scottie Pippen and Horace Grant at that summer's draft. In 1989, the Bulls played in their first conference finals series since 1975, losing to the Detroit Pistons. Coach Phil Jackson, an assistant since 1987, succeeded Doug Collins as head coach after that season and in 1991, the team won their first of three consecutive NBA championships by defeating Magic Johnson and the Lakers. Then they won two more consecutive titles in 1992 and 1993 after which Michael Jordan retired.

Although the Bulls signed European standout Toni Kukoč to help alleviate the loss, despite only two less wins from the year before, they could not extend their championship streak, falling short in hard fought 7 games battle to the New York Knicks in the 1994 Eastern Conference semifinals. The Bulls lost Horace Grant, who signed with the Orlando Magic as a free agent during the summer of 1994. However, Jordan returned to the Bulls in March 1995 and lost in 1995 NBA Playoffs despite posting one of his best numbers and close to his playoff average and with the added help of rebounding specialist Dennis Rodman, the team won three more championships from 1996 to 1998. The 1995–96 Bulls won a then-record 72 regular season games (out of 82) and are widely regarded as one of the greatest teams in NBA history.

=== Post-Jordan era ===
After the Bulls won their sixth championship, Phil Jackson was not re-signed and spent some time away from basketball. Michael Jordan then announced his second retirement, because general manager Jerry Krause wanted to begin rebuilding the roster with younger athletes. Six players from the 1997–98 Bulls (Scottie Pippen, Dennis Rodman, Steve Kerr, Luc Longley, Jud Buechler, and Scott Burrell) joined other teams through free agency or sign-and-trade deals, and with few established players left on the roster, the Bulls missed the 1999 playoffs. This began a six-year playoff drought, the longest such drought in team history.

The Bulls showed signs of improvement after hiring coach Scott Skiles in 2003, reaching the playoffs in 2005, 2006, and 2007. Some of the primary contributors on those teams were Ben Gordon, Luol Deng, and Kirk Hinrich. The Bulls' new playoff streak ended in 2008, when the team finished fourth in their division with a 33–49 record. After the season, the team hired a new coach, Vinny Del Negro. The Bulls' poor record did help them win the 2008 NBA draft lottery, which allowed them to select Derrick Rose with the first pick in the NBA draft. They made the 2009 NBA playoffs, only to lose in a seven-game series against the Boston Celtics which included a record seven overtime periods. In 2010, Del Negro was replaced by Tom Thibodeau, and the Bulls reached the 2011 Eastern Conference finals, losing to the Miami Heat in five games.

== Table key ==
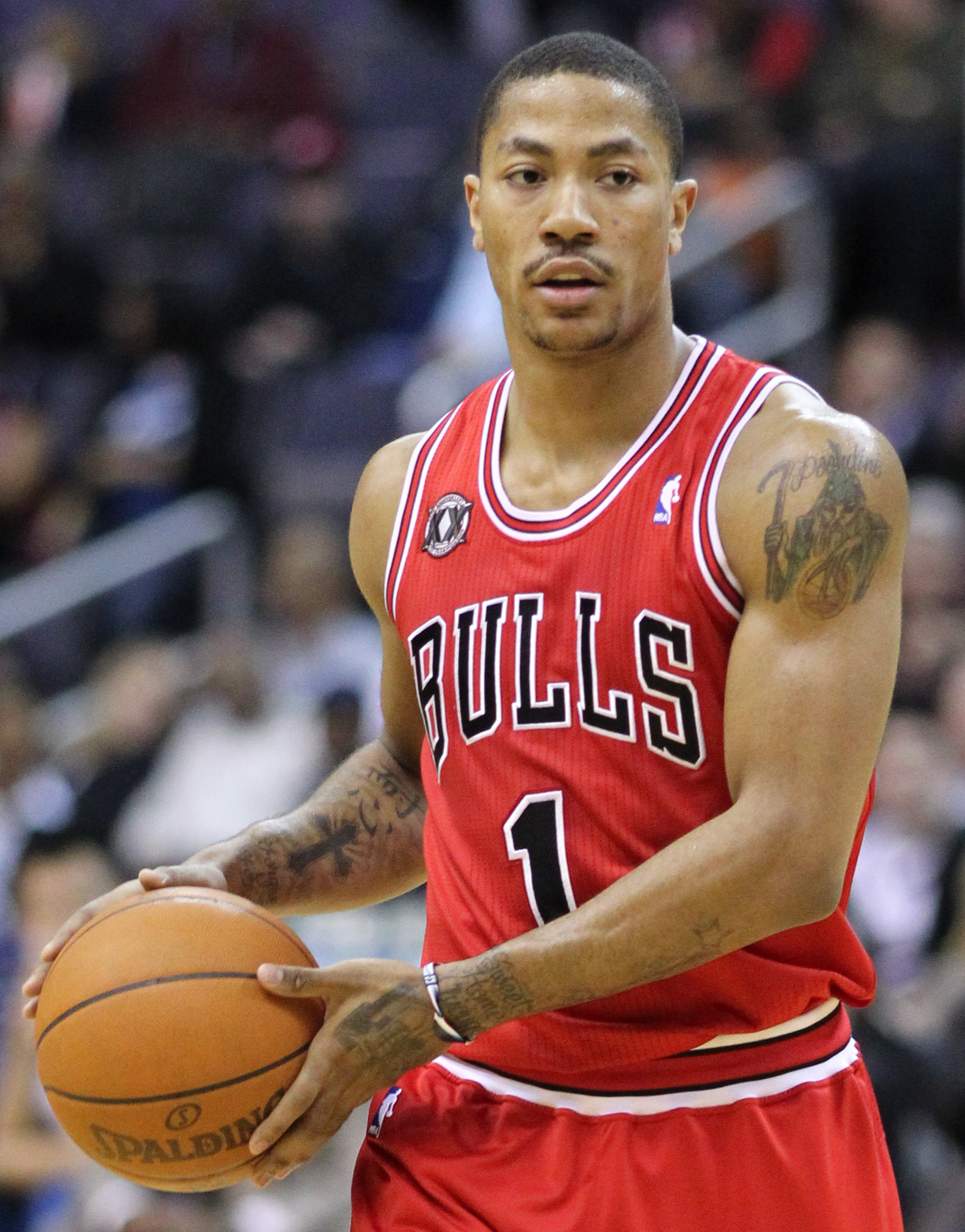
Derrick Rose was drafted by the Bulls in 2008 and led them to the Eastern Conference finals in 2011.

| ASG MVP | All-Star Game Most Valuable Player |
| COY | Coach of the Year |
| DPOY | Defensive Player of the Year |
| Finish | Final position in league or division standings |
| GB | Games behind first-place team in division (Note: The formula is: $\mathrm{Games}\ \mathrm{behind} = \frac{(\mathrm{Team A's}\ \mathrm{wins}-\mathrm{Team B's}\ \mathrm{wins}) + (\mathrm{Team B's}\ \mathrm{losses} - \mathrm{Team A's}\ \mathrm{losses})}{\mathrm{2}}$) |
| Losses | Number of regular season losses |
| EOY | Executive of the Year |
| FMVP | Finals Most Valuable Player |
| MVP | Most Valuable Player |
| ROY | Rookie of the Year |
| SIX | Sixth Man of the Year |
| SPOR | Sportsmanship Award |
| Wins | Number of regular season wins |

== Seasons ==
Note: Statistics are correct as of the 2025–26 season.

| NBA champions | Conference champions | Division champions | Playoff berth | Play-in berth |

| Season | Team | Conference | Finish | Division | Finish | Wins | Losses | Win% | GB | Playoffs | Awards | Head coach |
|---|---|---|---|---|---|---|---|---|---|---|---|---|
| 1966–67 | 1966–67 | — | — | Western | 4th | 33 | 48 | .407 | 11 | Lost Division semifinals (Hawks) 3–0 | Johnny Kerr (COY) | Johnny Kerr |
| 1967–68 | 1967–68 | — | — | Western | 4th | 29 | 53 | .354 | 27 | Lost Division semifinals (Lakers) 4–1 | — | Johnny Kerr |
| 1968–69 | 1968–69 | — | — | Western | 5th | 33 | 49 | .402 | 22 | | — | Dick Motta |
| 1969–70 | 1969–70 | — | — | Western | 3rd (Note: Though the Bulls had the same record as the Phoenix Suns in the Western Division, the Bulls lost the tiebreaker and finished third.) | 39 | 43 | .476 | 9 | Lost Division semifinals (Hawks) 4–1 | — | Dick Motta |
| 1970–71 | 1970–71 | Western | 3rd | Midwest (Note: The Western Division was renamed the Western Conference and split into the Midwest and Pacific divisions.) | 2nd | 51 | 31 | .622 | 2 | Lost conference semifinals (Lakers) 4–3 | Dick Motta (COY) | Dick Motta |
| 1971–72 | 1971–72 | Western | 3rd | Midwest | 2nd | 57 | 25 | .695 | 6 | Lost conference semifinals (Lakers) 4–0 | — | Dick Motta |
| 1972–73 | 1972–73 | Western | 3rd | Midwest | 2nd | 51 | 31 | .622 | 9 | Lost conference semifinals (Lakers) 4–3 | — | Dick Motta |
| 1973–74 | 1973–74 | Western | 3rd | Midwest | 2nd | 54 | 28 | .659 | 9 | Won conference semifinals (Pistons) 4–3; Lost conference finals (Bucks) 4–0 | — | Dick Motta |
| 1974–75 | 1974–75 | Western | 2nd | Midwest | 1st | 47 | 35 | .573 | — | Won conference semifinals (Kings) 4–2; Lost conference finals (Warriors) 4–3 | — | Dick Motta |
| 1975–76 | 1975–76 | Western | 9th | Midwest | 4th | 24 | 58 | .293 | 14 | | — | Dick Motta |
| 1976–77 | 1976–77 | Western | 6th | Midwest | 3rd (Note: Though the Bulls had the same record as the Detroit Pistons in the Midwest Division, the Bulls lost the tiebreaker and finished third.) | 44 | 38 | .537 | 6 | Lost First round (Trail Blazers) 2–1 | — | Ed Badger |
| 1977–78 | 1977–78 | Western | 8th | Midwest | 3rd | 40 | 42 | .488 | 8 | | — | Ed Badger |
| 1978–79 | 1978–79 | Western | 11th | Midwest | 5th | 31 | 51 | .378 | 17 | | — | Larry Costello; Scotty Robertson |
| 1979–80 | 1979–80 | Western | 9th | Midwest | 4th (Note: Though the Bulls had the same record as the Denver Nuggets in the Midwest Division, the Bulls lost the tiebreaker and finished fourth.) | 30 | 52 | .366 | 19 | | — | Jerry Sloan |
| 1980–81 | 1980–81 | Eastern | 5th | Central (Note: In 1980, the Dallas Mavericks entered the NBA as an expansion team and joined the Midwest Division of the Western Conference. The Bulls then moved to the Central Division of the Eastern Conference.) | 2nd | 45 | 37 | .549 | 15 | Won First round (Knicks) 2–0; Lost conference semifinals (Celtics) 4–0 | — | Jerry Sloan |
| 1981–82 | 1981–82 | Eastern | 9th | Central | 5th | 34 | 48 | .415 | 21 | | — | Jerry Sloan; Phil Johnson; Rod Thorn |
| 1982–83 | 1982–83 | Eastern | 9th | Central | 4th | 28 | 54 | .341 | 23 | | — | Paul Westhead |
| 1983–84 | 1983–84 | Eastern | 10th | Central | 5th | 27 | 55 | .329 | 23 | | — | Kevin Loughery |
| 1984–85 | 1984–85 | Eastern | 7th | Central | 3rd | 38 | 44 | .463 | 21 | Lost First round (Bucks) 3–1 | Michael Jordan (ROY) | Kevin Loughery |
| 1985–86 | 1985–86 | Eastern | 8th | Central | 4th | 30 | 52 | .366 | 27 | Lost First round (Celtics) 3–0 | — | Stan Albeck |
| 1986–87 | 1986–87 | Eastern | 8th | Central | 5th | 40 | 42 | .488 | 17 | Lost First round (Celtics) 3–0 | — | Doug Collins |
| 1987–88 | 1987–88 | Eastern | 3rd | Central | 2nd (Note: Though the Bulls had the same record as the Atlanta Hawks in the Central Division, the Bulls won the tiebreaker and finished second.) | 50 | 32 | .610 | 4 | Won First round (Cavaliers) 3–2; Lost conference semifinals (Pistons) 4–1 | Michael Jordan (MVP, DPOY, ASG MVP); Jerry Krause (EOY) | Doug Collins |
| 1988–89 | 1988–89 | Eastern | 6th | Central | 5th | 47 | 35 | .573 | 16 | Won First round (Cavaliers) 3–2; Won conference semifinals (Knicks) 4–2; Lost conference finals (Pistons) 4–2 | — | Doug Collins |
| 1989–90 | 1989–90 | Eastern | 3rd | Central | 2nd | 55 | 27 | .671 | 4 | Won First round (Bucks) 3–1; Won conference semifinals (76ers) 4–1; Lost conference finals (Pistons) 4–3 | — | Phil Jackson |
| 1990–91 | 1990–91 | Eastern | 1st | Central | 1st | 61 | 21 | .744 | — | Won First round (Knicks) 3–0; Won conference semifinals (76ers) 4–1; Won conference finals (Pistons) 4–0; Won NBA Finals (Lakers) 4–1 | Michael Jordan (MVP, FMVP) | Phil Jackson |
| 1991–92 | 1991–92 | Eastern | 1st | Central | 1st | 67 | 15 | .817 | — | Won First round (Heat) 3–0; Won conference semifinals (Knicks) 4–3; Won conference finals (Cavaliers) 4–2; Won NBA Finals (Trail Blazers) 4–2 | Michael Jordan (MVP, FMVP) | Phil Jackson |
| 1992–93 | 1992–93 | Eastern | 2nd | Central | 1st | 57 | 25 | .695 | — | Won First round (Hawks) 3–0; Won conference semifinals (Cavaliers) 4–0; Won conference finals (Knicks) 4–2; Won NBA Finals (Suns) 4–2 | Michael Jordan (FMVP) | Phil Jackson |
| 1993–94 | 1993–94 | Eastern | 3rd | Central | 2nd | 55 | 27 | .671 | 2 | Won First round (Cavaliers) 3–0; Lost conference semifinals (Knicks) 4–3 | Scottie Pippen (ASG MVP) | Phil Jackson |
| 1994–95 | 1994–95 | Eastern | 5th | Central | 3rd | 47 | 35 | .573 | 5 | Won First round (Hornets) 3–1; Lost conference semifinals (Magic) 4–2 | — | Phil Jackson |
| 1995–96 | 1995–96 | Eastern | 1st | Central | 1st | 72 | 10 | .878 | — | Won First round (Heat) 3–0; Won conference semifinals (Knicks) 4–1; Won conference finals (Magic) 4–0; Won NBA Finals (SuperSonics) 4–2 | Michael Jordan (MVP, FMVP, ASG MVP); Phil Jackson (COY); Jerry Krause (EOY); Toni Kukoč (SIX) | Phil Jackson |
| 1996–97 | 1996–97 | Eastern | 1st | Central | 1st | 69 | 13 | .841 | — | Won First round (Bullets) 3–0; Won conference semifinals (Hawks) 4–1; Won conference finals (Heat) 4–1; Won NBA Finals (Jazz) 4–2 | Michael Jordan (FMVP) | Phil Jackson |
| 1997–98 | 1997–98 | Eastern | 1st | Central | 1st | 62 | 20 | .756 | — | Won First round (Nets) 3–0; Won conference semifinals (Hornets) 4–1; Won conference finals (Pacers) 4–3; Won NBA Finals (Jazz) 4–2 | Michael Jordan (MVP, FMVP, ASG MVP) | Phil Jackson |
| 1998–99 | 1998–99 (Note: Due to a lockout, the season did not start until February 5, 1999, and all 29 teams played a shortened 50 game regular season schedule.) | Eastern | 15th | Central | 8th | 13 | 37 | .260 | 20 | | — | Tim Floyd |
| 1999–2000 | 1999–2000 | Eastern | 15th | Central | 8th | 17 | 65 | .207 | 39 | | Elton Brand (Note: Brand shared Rookie of the Year honors with Steve Francis of the Houston Rockets.) (ROY) | Tim Floyd |
| 2000–01 | 2000–01 | Eastern | 15th | Central | 8th | 15 | 67 | .183 | 37 | | — | Tim Floyd |
| 2001–02 | 2001–02 | Eastern | 15th | Central | 8th | 21 | 61 | .256 | 29 | | — | Tim Floyd; Bill Berry; Bill Cartwright |
| 2002–03 | 2002–03 | Eastern | 12th | Central | 6th | 30 | 52 | .366 | 20 | | — | Bill Cartwright |
| 2003–04 | 2003–04 | Eastern | 14th | Central | 8th | 23 | 59 | .280 | 38 | | — | Bill Cartwright; Pete Myers; Scott Skiles |
| 2004–05 | 2004–05 | Eastern | 4th | Central | 2nd | 47 | 35 | .573 | 7 | Lost First round (Wizards) 4–2 | Ben Gordon (SIX) | Scott Skiles |
| 2005–06 | 2005–06 | Eastern | 7th | Central | 4th (Note: Though the Bulls had the same record as the Indiana Pacers in the Central Division, the Bulls lost the tiebreaker and finished fourth.) | 41 | 41 | .500 | 23 | Lost First round (Heat) 4–2 | — | Scott Skiles |
| 2006–07 | 2006–07 | Eastern | 5th | Central | 3rd | 49 | 33 | .598 | 4 | Won First round (Heat) 4–0; Lost conference semifinals (Pistons) 4–2 | Luol Deng (SPOR) | Scott Skiles |
| 2007–08 | 2007–08 | Eastern | 11th | Central | 4th | 33 | 49 | .402 | 26 | | — | Scott Skiles; Pete Myers; Jim Boylan |
| 2008–09 | 2008–09 | Eastern | 7th | Central | 2nd | 41 | 41 | .500 | 25 | Lost First round (Celtics) 4–3 | Derrick Rose (ROY) | Vinny Del Negro |
| 2009–10 | 2009–10 | Eastern | 8th | Central | 3rd | 41 | 41 | .500 | 20 | Lost First round (Cavaliers) 4–1 | — | Vinny Del Negro |
| 2010–11 | 2010–11 | Eastern | 1st | Central | 1st | 62 | 20 | .756 | — | Won First round (Pacers) 4–1; Won conference semifinals (Hawks) 4–2; Lost conference finals (Heat) 4–1 | Derrick Rose (MVP); Tom Thibodeau (COY); Gar Forman (EOY) | Tom Thibodeau |
| 2011–12 | 2011–12 (Note: Due to a lockout, the season did not start until December 25, 2011, and all 30 teams played a shortened 66 game regular season schedule.) | Eastern | 1st | Central | 1st | 50 | 16 | .758 | — | Lost First round (76ers) 4–2 | — | Tom Thibodeau |
| 2012–13 | 2012–13 | Eastern | 5th | Central | 2nd | 45 | 37 | .549 | 4 | Won First round (Nets) 4–3; Lost conference semifinals (Heat) 4–1 | — | Tom Thibodeau |
| 2013–14 | 2013–14 | Eastern | 4th | Central | 2nd | 48 | 34 | .585 | 8 | Lost First round (Wizards) 4–1 | Joakim Noah (DPOY) | Tom Thibodeau |
| 2014–15 | 2014–15 | Eastern | 3rd | Central | 2nd | 50 | 32 | .610 | 3 | Won First round (Bucks) 4–2; Lost conference semifinals (Cavaliers) 4–2 | Jimmy Butler (MIP); Joakim Noah (JWKC) | Tom Thibodeau |
| 2015–16 | 2015–16 | Eastern | 9th | Central | 4th | 42 | 40 | .512 | 15 | | | Fred Hoiberg |
| 2016–17 | 2016–17 | Eastern | 8th | Central | 4th | 41 | 41 | .500 | 10 | Lost First round (Celtics) 4–2 | | Fred Hoiberg |
| 2017–18 | 2017–18 | Eastern | 13th | Central | 5th | 27 | 55 | .329 | 23 | | | Fred Hoiberg |
| 2018–19 | 2018–19 | Eastern | 13th | Central | 4th | 22 | 60 | .268 | 38 | | | Fred Hoiberg; Jim Boylen |
| 2019–20 | 2019–20 | Eastern | 11th | Central | 3rd | 22 | 43 | .338 | 30 | | | Jim Boylen |
| 2020–21 | 2020–21 | Eastern | 11th | Central | 3rd | 31 | 41 | .431 | 18 | | | Billy Donovan |
| 2021–22 | 2021–22 | Eastern | 6th | Central | 2nd | 46 | 36 | .561 | 7 | Lost First round (Bucks) 4–1 | | Billy Donovan |
| 2022–23 | 2022–23 | Eastern | 9th (Note: Earned 9th seed after beating the Toronto Raptors in the NBA play-in tournament.) | Central | 3rd | 40 | 42 | .488 | 18 | | | Billy Donovan |
| 2023–24 | 2023–24 | Eastern | 9th | Central | 4th | 39 | 43 | .476 | 10 | | | Billy Donovan |
| 2024–25 | 2024–25 | Eastern | 10th (Note: Fell to the 10th seed after losing to the Miami Heat in the NBA play-in tournament.) | Central | 5th | 39 | 43 | .476 | 25 | | | Billy Donovan |
| 2025–26 | 2025–26 | Eastern | 12th | Central | 4th | 31 | 51 | .378 | 29 | | | Billy Donovan |

=== All-time records ===
Note: Statistics are correct as of the 2025–26 season.

| Statistic | Wins | Losses | Win% |
|---|---|---|---|
| Chicago Bulls regular season record | 2,453 | 2,391 | .506 |
| Chicago Bulls postseason record | 187 | 162 | .536 |
| All-time regular and postseason record | 2,640 | 2,553 | .508 |

== Sources ==
- Sachare, Alex (1999). The Chicago Bulls Encyclopedia. Contemporary Books. ISBN 0-8092-2515-8.
- "Chicago Bulls". basketball-reference.com. Sports Reference LLC. Archived from the original on October 4, 2011.
- "Playoff Index". basketball-reference.com. Sports Reference LLC. Archived from the original on March 20, 2019.
