= NBA conference finals =

Eastern and Western championship series of the NBA

The NBA conference finals are the Eastern and Western Conference championship series of the National Basketball Association (NBA), a professional basketball league in North America. The NBA was founded in 1946 as the Basketball Association of America (BAA). The NBA adopted its current name at the start of the 1949–50 season when the BAA merged with the National Basketball League (NBL). The league consists of 30 teams, of which 29 are located in the United States and 1 in Canada. Each team plays 82 games in the regular season. (Note: Exceptions include the 1998–99 season, which was shortened to 50 games due to a lockout, the 2011–12 season, shortened to 66 games due to another lockout, the 2019–20 season, shortened to between 63 and 75 games due to the season's suspension due to the COVID-19 pandemic, and the 2020–21 season, shortened to 72 games, also due to the COVID-19 pandemic.) After the regular season, eight teams from each of the league's two conferences qualify for the playoffs. At the end of the playoffs, the top two teams play each other in the conference finals, to determine the conference champions from each side, who then proceed to play in the NBA Finals. Trophies were given to each conference winner starting in 2001. In 2022, the league started naming a conference finals most valuable player (MVP) for each conference.

== Overview ==
Initially, the BAA teams were aligned into the Eastern and Western divisions. The division finals were first played in 1949, the league's third season. The first two seasons used a playoffs format where Eastern and Western division teams would face each other before the BAA Finals. Hence, there were no divisional finals. In the 1949–50 season, the league realigned itself to three divisions, with the addition of the Central Division. However, the arrangement was only used for one season, and the league returned to the two-division format in 1951. The two divisions' format remained until 1970 when the NBA realigned itself into two conferences with two divisions each, which led to the creation of the conference finals.

The finals were a best-of-three series from 1949 to 1950, a best-of-five series from 1951 to 1956, and a best-of-seven series since 1957. The conference finals are played in a best-of-seven series like the NBA playoffs and Finals. The two series are played in late May each year after the first and second rounds of the playoffs and before the Finals. After the conference finals, winners are presented with a silver trophy, caps, and T-shirts and advance to the NBA Finals.

The Los Angeles Lakers have won the most conference titles with 19. They have also made 24 appearances in the conference finals, more than any other team, which included eight consecutive appearances in the Western Conference finals from 1982 to 1989. The Boston Celtics have won 11 conference championships, the second most of any team. 23 of the 30 active franchises have won at least one conference title. The Minnesota Timberwolves, Atlanta Hawks, Sacramento Kings, Memphis Grizzlies and Los Angeles Clippers have each played in at least one conference finals, but have failed to win their respective conference title. Two other franchises, the Charlotte Hornets and New Orleans Pelicans, have never appeared in the conference finals.

== Conference trophies ==
The NBA first awarded conference championship trophies in 2001. In 2022, both were redesigned, and named the Bob Cousy Trophy for the Eastern Conference and the Oscar Robertson Trophy for the Western Conference, in honor of two men who were instrumental in developing and advancing the players' labor union, the National Basketball Players Association (NBPA). The two redesigned trophies each feature a silver basketball with its respective conference finals logo on the underside. The trophies also have a slightly different base for each conference to help distinguish one from the other; the silver basketball on the Eastern Conference trophy sits on three pegs, while the Western Conference trophy has the basketball on intercrossing circular rings. The silver basketball is quartered into four sections, representing the winning team first qualifying for the playoffs and then advancing through the three playoff rounds. In that same year, the NBA began awarding conference finals MVPs to the best-performing player of each conference finals.

== Key ==
	NBA champion, winner of the NBA Finals
†	Team with the best regular season record, or tie for best

== Conference ==
=== Eastern Conference finals ===
Year	Champion	Coach	Result	Runner-up	Coach
1971	Baltimore Bullets	Gene Shue	4–3	New York Knicks	Red Holzman
1972	New York Knicks	Red Holzman	4–1	Boston Celtics	Tom Heinsohn
1973	New York Knicks	Red Holzman	4–3	Boston Celtics†	Tom Heinsohn
1974	Boston Celtics	Tom Heinsohn	4–1	New York Knicks	Red Holzman
1975	Washington Bullets†	K. C. Jones	4–2	Boston Celtics†	Tom Heinsohn
1976	Boston Celtics	Tom Heinsohn	4–2	Cleveland Cavaliers	Bill Fitch
1977	Philadelphia 76ers	Gene Shue	4–2	Houston Rockets	Tom Nissalke
1978	Washington Bullets	Dick Motta	4–2	Philadelphia 76ers	Billy Cunningham
1979	Washington Bullets†	Dick Motta	4–3	San Antonio Spurs	Doug Moe
1980	Philadelphia 76ers	Billy Cunningham	4–1	Boston Celtics†	Bill Fitch
1981	Boston Celtics†	Bill Fitch	4–3	Philadelphia 76ers†	Billy Cunningham
1982	Philadelphia 76ers	Billy Cunningham	4–3	Boston Celtics†	Bill Fitch
1983	Philadelphia 76ers†	Billy Cunningham	4–1	Milwaukee Bucks	Don Nelson
1984	Boston Celtics†	K. C. Jones	4–1	Milwaukee Bucks	Don Nelson
1985	Boston Celtics†	K. C. Jones	4–1	Philadelphia 76ers	Billy Cunningham
1986	Boston Celtics†	K. C. Jones	4–0	Milwaukee Bucks	Don Nelson
1987	Boston Celtics	K. C. Jones	4–3	Detroit Pistons	Chuck Daly
1988	Detroit Pistons	Chuck Daly	4–2	Boston Celtics	K. C. Jones
1989	Detroit Pistons†	Chuck Daly	4–2	Chicago Bulls	Doug Collins
1990	Detroit Pistons	Chuck Daly	4–3	Chicago Bulls	Phil Jackson
1991	Chicago Bulls	Phil Jackson	4–0	Detroit Pistons	Chuck Daly
1992	Chicago Bulls†	Phil Jackson	4–2	Cleveland Cavaliers	Lenny Wilkens
1993	Chicago Bulls	Phil Jackson	4–2	New York Knicks	Pat Riley
1994	New York Knicks	Pat Riley	4–3	Indiana Pacers	Larry Brown
1995	Orlando Magic	Brian Hill	4–3	Indiana Pacers	Larry Brown
1996	Chicago Bulls†	Phil Jackson	4–0	Orlando Magic	Brian Hill
1997	Chicago Bulls†	Phil Jackson	4–1	Miami Heat	Pat Riley
1998	Chicago Bulls†	Phil Jackson	4–3	Indiana Pacers	Larry Bird
1999	New York Knicks	Jeff Van Gundy	4–2	Indiana Pacers	Larry Bird
2000	Indiana Pacers	Larry Bird	4–2	New York Knicks	Jeff Van Gundy
2001	Philadelphia 76ers	Larry Brown	4–3	Milwaukee Bucks	George Karl
2002	New Jersey Nets	Byron Scott	4–2	Boston Celtics	Jim O'Brien
2003	New Jersey Nets	Byron Scott	4–0	Detroit Pistons	Rick Carlisle
2004	Detroit Pistons	Larry Brown	4–2	Indiana Pacers†	Rick Carlisle
2005	Detroit Pistons	Larry Brown	4–3	Miami Heat	Stan Van Gundy
2006	Miami Heat	Pat Riley	4–2	Detroit Pistons†	Flip Saunders
2007	Cleveland Cavaliers	Mike Brown	4–2	Detroit Pistons	Flip Saunders
2008	Boston Celtics†	Doc Rivers	4–2	Detroit Pistons	Flip Saunders
2009	Orlando Magic	Stan Van Gundy	4–2	Cleveland Cavaliers†	Mike Brown
2010	Boston Celtics	Doc Rivers	4–2	Orlando Magic	Stan Van Gundy
2011	Miami Heat	Erik Spoelstra	4–1	Chicago Bulls†	Tom Thibodeau
2012	Miami Heat	Erik Spoelstra	4–3	Boston Celtics	Doc Rivers
2013	Miami Heat†	Erik Spoelstra	4–3	Indiana Pacers	Frank Vogel
2014	Miami Heat	Erik Spoelstra	4–2	Indiana Pacers	Frank Vogel
2015	Cleveland Cavaliers	David Blatt	4–0	Atlanta Hawks	Mike Budenholzer
2016	Cleveland Cavaliers	Tyronn Lue	4–2	Toronto Raptors	Dwane Casey
2017	Cleveland Cavaliers	Tyronn Lue	4–1	Boston Celtics	Brad Stevens
2018	Cleveland Cavaliers	Tyronn Lue	4–3	Boston Celtics	Brad Stevens
2019	Toronto Raptors	Nick Nurse	4–2	Milwaukee Bucks†	Mike Budenholzer
2020	Miami Heat	Erik Spoelstra	4–2	Boston Celtics	Brad Stevens
2021	Milwaukee Bucks	Mike Budenholzer	4–2	Atlanta Hawks	Nate McMillan
2022	Boston Celtics	Ime Udoka	4–3	Miami Heat	Erik Spoelstra
2023	Miami Heat	Erik Spoelstra	4–3	Boston Celtics	Joe Mazzulla
2024	Boston Celtics†	Joe Mazzulla	4–0	Indiana Pacers	Rick Carlisle
2025	Indiana Pacers	Rick Carlisle	4–2	New York Knicks	Tom Thibodeau
2026	New York Knicks	Mike Brown	4–0	Cleveland Cavaliers	Kenny Atkinson

=== Western Conference finals ===
Year	Champion	Coach	Result	Runner-up	Coach
1971	Milwaukee Bucks†	Larry Costello	4–1	Los Angeles Lakers	Joe Mullaney
1972	Los Angeles Lakers†	Bill Sharman	4–2	Milwaukee Bucks	Larry Costello
1973	Los Angeles Lakers	Bill Sharman	4–1	Golden State Warriors	Al Attles
1974	Milwaukee Bucks†	Larry Costello	4–0	Chicago Bulls	Dick Motta
1975	Golden State Warriors	Al Attles	4–3	Chicago Bulls	Dick Motta
1976	Phoenix Suns	John MacLeod	4–3	Golden State Warriors†	Al Attles
1977	Portland Trail Blazers	Jack Ramsay	4–0	Los Angeles Lakers†	Jerry West
1978	Seattle SuperSonics	Lenny Wilkens	4–2	Denver Nuggets	Larry Brown
1979	Seattle SuperSonics	Lenny Wilkens	4–3	Phoenix Suns	John MacLeod
1980	Los Angeles Lakers	Paul Westhead	4–1	Seattle SuperSonics	Lenny Wilkens
1981	Houston Rockets	Del Harris	4–1	Kansas City Kings	Cotton Fitzsimmons
1982	Los Angeles Lakers	Pat Riley	4–0	San Antonio Spurs	Stan Albeck
1983	Los Angeles Lakers	Pat Riley	4–2	San Antonio Spurs	Stan Albeck
1984	Los Angeles Lakers	Pat Riley	4–2	Phoenix Suns	John MacLeod
1985	Los Angeles Lakers	Pat Riley	4–1	Denver Nuggets	Doug Moe
1986	Houston Rockets	Bill Fitch	4–1	Los Angeles Lakers	Pat Riley
1987	Los Angeles Lakers†	Pat Riley	4–0	Seattle SuperSonics	Bernie Bickerstaff
1988	Los Angeles Lakers†	Pat Riley	4–3	Dallas Mavericks	John MacLeod
1989	Los Angeles Lakers	Pat Riley	4–0	Phoenix Suns	Cotton Fitzsimmons
1990	Portland Trail Blazers	Rick Adelman	4–2	Phoenix Suns	Cotton Fitzsimmons
1991	Los Angeles Lakers	Mike Dunleavy	4–2	Portland Trail Blazers†	Rick Adelman
1992	Portland Trail Blazers	Rick Adelman	4–2	Utah Jazz	Jerry Sloan
1993	Phoenix Suns†	Paul Westphal	4–3	Seattle SuperSonics	George Karl
1994	Houston Rockets	Rudy Tomjanovich	4–1	Utah Jazz	Jerry Sloan
1995	Houston Rockets	Rudy Tomjanovich	4–2	San Antonio Spurs†	Bob Hill
1996	Seattle SuperSonics	George Karl	4–3	Utah Jazz	Jerry Sloan
1997	Utah Jazz	Jerry Sloan	4–2	Houston Rockets	Rudy Tomjanovich
1998	Utah Jazz†	Jerry Sloan	4–0	Los Angeles Lakers	Del Harris
1999	San Antonio Spurs†	Gregg Popovich	4–0	Portland Trail Blazers	Mike Dunleavy
2000	Los Angeles Lakers†	Phil Jackson	4–3	Portland Trail Blazers	Mike Dunleavy
2001	Los Angeles Lakers	Phil Jackson	4–0	San Antonio Spurs†	Gregg Popovich
2002	Los Angeles Lakers	Phil Jackson	4–3	Sacramento Kings†	Rick Adelman
2003	San Antonio Spurs†	Gregg Popovich	4–2	Dallas Mavericks†	Don Nelson
2004	Los Angeles Lakers	Phil Jackson	4–2	Minnesota Timberwolves	Flip Saunders
2005	San Antonio Spurs	Gregg Popovich	4–1	Phoenix Suns†	Mike D'Antoni
2006	Dallas Mavericks	Avery Johnson	4–2	Phoenix Suns	Mike D'Antoni
2007	San Antonio Spurs	Gregg Popovich	4–1	Utah Jazz	Jerry Sloan
2008	Los Angeles Lakers	Phil Jackson	4–1	San Antonio Spurs	Gregg Popovich
2009	Los Angeles Lakers	Phil Jackson	4–2	Denver Nuggets	George Karl
2010	Los Angeles Lakers	Phil Jackson	4–2	Phoenix Suns	Alvin Gentry
2011	Dallas Mavericks	Rick Carlisle	4–1	Oklahoma City Thunder	Scott Brooks
2012	Oklahoma City Thunder	Scott Brooks	4–2	San Antonio Spurs†	Gregg Popovich
2013	San Antonio Spurs	Gregg Popovich	4–0	Memphis Grizzlies	Lionel Hollins
2014	San Antonio Spurs†	Gregg Popovich	4–2	Oklahoma City Thunder	Scott Brooks
2015	Golden State Warriors†	Steve Kerr	4–1	Houston Rockets	Kevin McHale
2016	Golden State Warriors†	Steve Kerr	4–3	Oklahoma City Thunder	Billy Donovan
2017	Golden State Warriors†	Steve Kerr	4–0	San Antonio Spurs	Gregg Popovich
2018	Golden State Warriors	Steve Kerr	4–3	Houston Rockets†	Mike D'Antoni
2019	Golden State Warriors	Steve Kerr	4–0	Portland Trail Blazers	Terry Stotts
2020	Los Angeles Lakers	Frank Vogel	4–1	Denver Nuggets	Michael Malone
2021	Phoenix Suns	Monty Williams	4–2	Los Angeles Clippers	Tyronn Lue
2022	Golden State Warriors	Steve Kerr	4–1	Dallas Mavericks	Jason Kidd
2023	Denver Nuggets	Michael Malone	4–0	Los Angeles Lakers	Darvin Ham
2024	Dallas Mavericks	Jason Kidd	4–1	Minnesota Timberwolves	Chris Finch
2025	Oklahoma City Thunder†	Mark Daigneault	4–1	Minnesota Timberwolves	Chris Finch
2026	San Antonio Spurs	Mitch Johnson	4–3	Oklahoma City Thunder†	Mark Daigneault

== Results by team ==
Note: statistics are correct as of the 2026 NBA playoffs.

=== Total number of appearances ===
Team	East	West	Total	East	West	Total	Total appearances
Team	Champions			Runner-up			Total appearances
Los Angeles Lakers	0	19	19	0	5	5	24
Boston Celtics	11	0	11	12	0	12	23
San Antonio Spurs	0	7	7	1	7	8	15
Seattle SuperSonics / Oklahoma City Thunder	0	5	5	0	7	7	12
Chicago Bulls	6	0	6	3	2	5	11
Detroit Pistons	5	0	5	6	0	6	11
Miami Heat	7	0	7	3	0	3	10
Phoenix Suns	0	3	3	0	7	7	10
New York Knicks	5	0	5	5	0	5	10
Indiana Pacers	2	0	2	8	0	8	10
San Francisco / Golden State Warriors	0	7	7	0	2	2	9
Milwaukee Bucks	1	2	3	5	1	6	9
Cleveland Cavaliers	5	0	5	4	0	4	9
Philadelphia 76ers	5	0	5	3	0	3	8
Houston Rockets	0	4	4	1	3	4	8
Portland Trail Blazers	0	3	3	0	4	4	7
Utah Jazz	0	2	2	0	4	4	6
Dallas Mavericks	0	3	3	0	3	3	6
Denver Nuggets	0	1	1	0	4	4	5
Baltimore / Washington Bullets	4	0	4	0	0	0	4
Orlando Magic	2	0	2	2	0	2	4
Minnesota Timberwolves	0	0	0	0	3	3	3
Toronto Raptors	1	0	1	1	0	1	2
Atlanta Hawks	0	0	0	2	0	2	2
New Jersey / Brooklyn Nets	2	0	2	0	0	0	2
Kansas City / Sacramento Kings	0	0	0	0	2	2	2
Memphis Grizzlies	0	0	0	0	1	1	1
Los Angeles Clippers	0	0	0	0	1	1	1
New Orleans Hornets/Pelicans	0	0	0	0	0	0	0
Charlotte Bobcats/Hornets	0	0	0	0	0	0	0

=== Years of appearance ===
In the sortable table below, teams are ordered first by number of appearances, then by number of wins, and finally by year of first appearance. In the "Season(s)" column, bold years indicate winning conference finals appearances.

Apps	Team	Wins	Losses	Win %	Season(s)
24	Los Angeles Lakers	19	5	.792	1971, 1972, 1973, 1977, 1980, 1982, 1983, 1984, 1985, 1986, 1987, 1988, 1989, 1991, 1998, 2000, 2001, 2002, 2004, 2008, 2009, 2010, 2020, 2023
23	Boston Celtics	11	12	.478	1972, 1973, 1974, 1975, 1976, 1980, 1981, 1982, 1984, 1985, 1986, 1987, 1988, 2002, 2008, 2010, 2012, 2017, 2018, 2020, 2022, 2023, 2024
15	San Antonio Spurs	7	8	.467	1979, 1982, 1983, 1995, 1999, 2001, 2003, 2005, 2007, 2008, 2012, 2013, 2014, 2017, 2026
12	Oklahoma City Thunder	5	7	.417	1978, 1979, 1980, 1987, 1993, 1996, 2011, 2012, 2014, 2016, 2025, 2026
11	Chicago Bulls	6	5	.545	1974, 1975, 1989, 1990, 1991, 1992, 1993, 1996, 1997, 1998, 2011
11	Detroit Pistons	5	6	.455	1987, 1988, 1989, 1990, 1991, 2003, 2004, 2005, 2006, 2007, 2008
10	Miami Heat	7	3	.700	1997, 2005, 2006, 2011, 2012, 2013, 2014, 2020, 2022, 2023
10	Phoenix Suns	3	7	.300	1976, 1979, 1984, 1989, 1990, 1993, 2005, 2006, 2010, 2021
10	New York Knicks	5	5	.500	1971, 1972, 1973, 1974, 1993, 1994, 1999, 2000, 2025, 2026
10	Indiana Pacers	2	8	.200	1994, 1995, 1998, 1999, 2000, 2004, 2013, 2014, 2024, 2025
9	Golden State Warriors	7	2	.778	1973, 1975, 1976, 2015, 2016, 2017, 2018, 2019, 2022
9	Cleveland Cavaliers	5	4	.556	1976, 1992, 2007, 2009, 2015, 2016, 2017, 2018, 2026
9	Milwaukee Bucks	3	6	.333	1971, 1972, 1974, 1983, 1984, 1986, 2001, 2019, 2021
8	Philadelphia 76ers	5	3	.625	1977, 1978, 1980, 1981, 1982, 1983, 1985, 2001
8	Houston Rockets	4	4	.500	1977, 1981, 1986, 1994, 1995, 1997, 2015, 2018
7	Portland Trail Blazers	3	4	.429	1977, 1990, 1991, 1992, 1999, 2000, 2019
6	Dallas Mavericks	3	3	.500	1988, 2003, 2006, 2011, 2022, 2024
6	Utah Jazz	2	4	.333	1992, 1994, 1996, 1997, 1998, 2007
5	Denver Nuggets	1	4	.200	1978, 1985, 2009, 2020, 2023
4	Washington Wizards	4	0	1.000	1971, 1975, 1978, 1979
4	Orlando Magic	2	2	.500	1995, 1996, 2009, 2010
3	Minnesota Timberwolves	0	3	.000	2004, 2024, 2025
2	Brooklyn Nets	2	0	1.000	2002, 2003
2	Toronto Raptors	1	1	.500	2016, 2019
2	Sacramento Kings	0	2	.000	1981, 2002
2	Atlanta Hawks	0	2	.000	2015, 2021
1	Memphis Grizzlies	0	1	.000	2013
1	Los Angeles Clippers	0	1	.000	2021
0	Charlotte Hornets	0	0	–	
0	New Orleans Pelicans	0	0	–	

== See also ==
- List of NBA champions
- List of NBA seasons
