= Ben Kelso =

American basketball player and coach (born 1949)

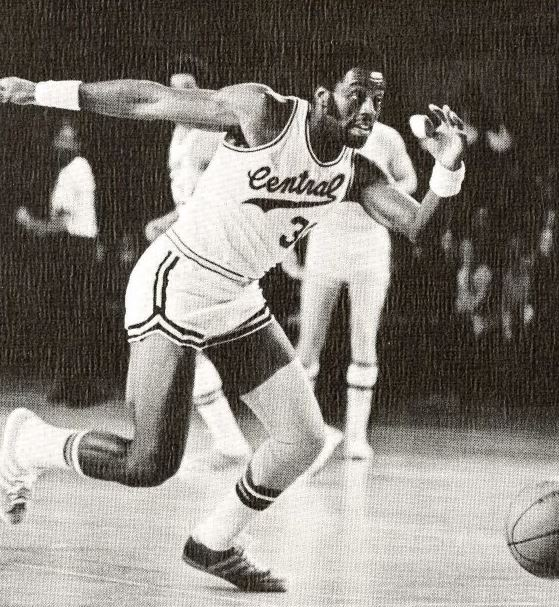
- Kelso as a senior at Central Michigan

Personal information
- Born: April 11, 1949 (age 77) Flint, Michigan, U.S.
- Listed height: 6 ft 3 in (1.91 m)
- Listed weight: 195 lb (88 kg)

Career information
- High school: Southwestern (Flint, Michigan)
- College: Central Michigan (1970–1973)
- NBA draft: 1973: 8th round, 129th overall pick
- Drafted by: Detroit Pistons
- Playing career: 1973–1974
- Position: Shooting guard
- Number: 5, 30

Career history

Playing
- 1973–1974: Detroit Pistons

Career highlights
- First-team All-MAC (1973); No. 30 retired by Central Michigan Chippewas
- Stats at NBA.com
- Stats at Basketball Reference

Ben Kelso (born April 11, 1949) is an American basketball player. He played as a shooting guard for the Detroit Pistons in 1972 and 1973.

== Playing career ==
Kelso, a graduate of Central Michigan University, was drafted by Coach Ray Scott and the Pistons (in the 8th rounds of both 1972 and 1973 drafts), where he played from 1973 to 1974. In 1976, Kelso was hired by Scott as one of his assistant coaches at Eastern Michigan University. Over three seasons, he helped guide EMU to a 29–52 record. EMU fired Scott and his staff in March 1979.

== Coaching career ==
After retiring, Kelso began coaching students at various schools. At Detroit's Cooley High School, where he coached for 14 years, Kelso lead the team to three (3) consecutive state championships in 1987, 1988 and 1989, which led to his appearance in the March 5, 1990 edition of Sports Illustrated.

In 1998, Kelso transferred over to Southfield High School as coach and athletic director where he was credited with rejuvenating the girls' basketball program and winning two state championships.

On December 17, 2002, Kelso was fired by the Southfield Board of Education after being accused of allegedly misappropriating funds from school ticket and concession sales. Police and the District Attorneys Office concluded that there was insufficient evidence to arrest Kelso. 18 months later, the State Tenure Commission concluded that Kelso was wrongfully terminated and advised him to resume his job.

Kelso ultimately took a new job as gym instructor with Southfield's Arthur Ashe Academy after Southfield High School officials refused to speak with him and later refused to reissue his original job title. Kelso later became the head coach at Mumford High School.

On April 29, 2013, Kelso was offered and accepted the head coach position for the varsity boys' basketball team at Waterford Kettering High School in Waterford, Michigan. After leaving for one season at Waterford Kettering, he took the same position over at Pontiac High School. He also periodically conducts his own basketball training program for youth, collegiate and professionals players in Michigan.

== Career statistics ==
Legend
GP	Games played	GS	Games started	MPG	Minutes per game
FG%	Field goal percentage	3P%	3-point field goal percentage	FT%	Free throw percentage
RPG	Rebounds per game	APG	Assists per game	SPG	Steals per game
BPG	Blocks per game	PPG	Points per game	**Bold**	Career high

=== NBA ===
==== Regular season ====
Year	Team	GP	MPG	FG%	FT%	RPG	APG	SPG	BPG	PPG
1973–74	Detroit	46	6.5	.365	.682	.7	.4	.3	.0	1.8

==== Playoffs ====
Year	Team	GP	MPG	FG%	FT%	RPG	APG	SPG	BPG	PPG
1974	Detroit	1	1.0	.000	–	1.0	1.0	.0	.0	.0
