= 1998 NBA Finals =

1998 basketball championship series

Team	Coach	Wins
Chicago Bulls	Phil Jackson	4
Utah Jazz	Jerry Sloan	2
- Dates: June 3–14
- MVP: Michael Jordan (Chicago Bulls)
- Hall of Famers: Bulls: Michael Jordan (2009); Toni Kukoc (2021); Scottie Pippen (2010); Dennis Rodman (2011); Jazz: Karl Malone (2010); John Stockton (2009); Coaches: Phil Jackson (2007); Jerry Sloan (2009); Tex Winter (2011); Officials: Dick Bavetta (2015); Danny Crawford (2025); Hugh Evans (2022)
- Eastern finals: Bulls defeated Pacers, 4–3
- Western finals: Jazz defeated Lakers, 4–0

The 1998 NBA Finals was the championship series of the National Basketball Association's (NBA) 1997–98 season, and the conclusion of the season's playoffs. The two-time defending NBA champion and Eastern Conference champion Chicago Bulls played against the Western Conference champion Utah Jazz, with the Jazz holding home-court advantage for the first 2 games in Salt Lake City. In a repeat of the previous year's Finals, the Bulls defeated the Jazz in six games for their third consecutive NBA title and their sixth in eight seasons.

Michael Jordan was voted the NBA Finals MVP of the series (he also had won the award the last five times the Bulls won the Finals: 1991, 1992, 1993, 1996, and 1997). This would be his sixth NBA championship and sixth Finals MVP award in six full basketball seasons. This would be his final season of winning the NBA championship and Finals MVP. Until 2021 this would be the last finals not to feature a team from California, Florida, or Texas.

The 1998 Finals garnered the highest Nielsen TV ratings in NBA history at 18.7, and even surpassed the Nielsen ratings for the 1998 World Series, marking the first time the NBA had a higher rating in its championship round than of Major League Baseball's championship round.

The Bulls headed into the series as the underdogs. Bulls' small forward Scottie Pippen stated, "It's a different feeling. We’ve never been in this situation where we’ve sort of been written off. It’s a great feeling being the underdog because you want to go out now and prove everybody wrong."

As of 2026, this is Chicago's most recent championship and Finals appearance, and they currently hold the longest Finals appearance drought of the Central Division teams.

== Background ==
Entering the 1997–98, this was widely expected to be the last season of the Chicago Bulls core of Michael Jordan, Scottie Pippen, Dennis Rodman, and head coach Phil Jackson. In training camp, Phil Jackson wrote on the chalk board and named the season "The Last Dance".

A point of contention for the Bulls was Scottie Pippen's contract status. Pippen had purposefully delayed off-season surgery so that his summer off-season would not be complicated by rehab, pushing his unavailability well into the regular season. In addition to this increasing the load on Jordan to drive the team towards a potential final championship together, it stirred an active effort by Bulls general manager Jerry Krause to trade Pippen, who responded in turn with his own trade demand. In spite of this drama, Pippen ultimately rejoined the team in January, playing only 44 games on the season.

In the playoffs, the Jazz were pushed to the brink by the Houston Rockets before winning Game 5 in Utah, and then overcame Rookie of the Year Tim Duncan and the San Antonio Spurs 4–1. They then swept the Los Angeles Lakers in the Western Conference finals. The Bulls swept the New Jersey Nets and then took out the Charlotte Hornets in five, but it took seven games to overcome the Indiana Pacers in the Eastern Conference Finals. The series marked the first time since 1989 that the same two teams met in the Finals in consecutive years. The Jazz earned the league's best record by virtue of sweeping the two-game regular season series with the Bulls despite both teams finishing at 62 wins.

By 1998, the Finals logo was now embroidered on the Finals participants' jerseys, instead of the Larry O'Brien trophy patch as seen from 1996 and 1997.

=== Road to the Finals ===
Utah Jazz (Western Conference champion)		Chicago Bulls (Eastern Conference champion)
# / Western Conference; # / Team / W / L / PCT / GB; 1 / z-Utah Jazz / 62 / 20 / .756 / –; 2 / y-Seattle SuperSonics / 61 / 21 / .744 / 1; 3 / x-Los Angeles Lakers / 61 / 21 / .744 / 1; 4 / x-Phoenix Suns / 56 / 26 / .683 / 6; 5 / x-San Antonio Spurs / 56 / 26 / .683 / 6; 6 / x-Portland Trail Blazers / 46 / 36 / .561 / 16; 7 / x-Minnesota Timberwolves / 45 / 37 / .549 / 17; 8 / x-Houston Rockets / 41 / 41 / .500 / 21; 9 / Sacramento Kings / 27 / 55 / .329 / 35; 10 / Dallas Mavericks / 20 / 62 / .244 / 42; 11 / Vancouver Grizzlies / 19 / 63 / .232 / 43; 12 / Golden State Warriors / 19 / 63 / .232 / 43; 13 / Los Angeles Clippers / 17 / 65 / .207 / 45; 14 / Denver Nuggets / 11 / 71 / .134 / 51; First seed in the West, best league record	Regular season	# / Eastern Conference; # / Team / W / L / PCT / GB; 1 / c-Chicago Bulls / 62 / 20 / .756 / –; 2 / y-Miami Heat / 55 / 27 / .671 / 7; 3 / x-Indiana Pacers / 58 / 24 / .707 / 4; 4 / x-Charlotte Hornets / 51 / 31 / .622 / 11; 5 / x-Atlanta Hawks / 50 / 32 / .610 / 12; 6 / x-Cleveland Cavaliers / 47 / 35 / .573 / 15; 7 / x-New York Knicks / 43 / 39 / .524 / 19; 8 / x-New Jersey Nets / 43 / 39 / .524 / 19; 9 / Washington Wizards / 42 / 40 / .512 / 20; 10 / Orlando Magic / 41 / 41 / .500 / 21; 11 / Detroit Pistons / 37 / 45 / .451 / 25; 12 / Boston Celtics / 36 / 46 / .439 / 26; 13 / Milwaukee Bucks / 36 / 46 / .439 / 26; 14 / Philadelphia 76ers / 31 / 51 / .378 / 31; 15 / Toronto Raptors / 16 / 66 / .195 / 46; First seed in the East, second-best league record
Defeated the (8) Houston Rockets, 3–2	First round	Defeated the (8) New Jersey Nets, 3–0
Defeated the (5) San Antonio Spurs, 4–1	Conference semifinals	Defeated the (4) Charlotte Hornets, 4–1
Defeated the (3) Los Angeles Lakers, 4–0	Conference finals	Defeated the (3) Indiana Pacers, 4–3

=== Regular season series ===
The Utah Jazz won both games in the regular season series:

January 25, 1998

Utah Jazz 101, Chicago Bulls 94

United Center, Chicago, Illinois

February 4, 1998

Chicago Bulls 93, Utah Jazz 101

Delta Center, Salt Lake City, Utah

The Jazz were the only Western Conference team to beat the Bulls in a season twice since Jordan came back from his second retirement.

== 1998 NBA Finals rosters ==
=== Chicago Bulls ===
1997–98 Chicago Bulls roster
Players

Pos.	No.	Player	Height	Weight	DOB	From
SF	22	Keith Booth	6 ft 6 in (1.98 m)	226 lb (103 kg)	1974–10–09	Maryland
PG	1	Randy Brown	6 ft 2 in (1.88 m)	190 lb (86 kg)	1968–05–22	New Mexico State
SF	30	Jud Buechler	6 ft 6 in (1.98 m)	220 lb (100 kg)	1968–06–19	Arizona
SF	24	Scott Burrell	6 ft 7 in (2.01 m)	218 lb (99 kg)	1971–01–12	Connecticut
PG	9	Ron Harper	6 ft 6 in (1.98 m)	185 lb (84 kg)	1964–01–20	Miami (OH)
SG	23	Michael Jordan	6 ft 6 in (1.98 m)	215 lb (98 kg)	1963–02–17	North Carolina
PG	25	Steve Kerr	6 ft 3 in (1.91 m)	175 lb (79 kg)	1965–09–27	Arizona
C	53	Joe Kleine	6 ft 11 in (2.11 m)	255 lb (116 kg)	1962–01–04	Arkansas
SF	7	Toni Kukoč	6 ft 10 in (2.08 m)	192 lb (87 kg)	1968–09–18	Croatia
PG	5	Rusty LaRue	6 ft 2 in (1.88 m)	210 lb (95 kg)	1973–12–10	Wake Forest
C	13	Luc Longley	7 ft 2 in (2.18 m)	265 lb (120 kg)	1969–01–19	New Mexico
SF	33	Scottie Pippen	6 ft 8 in (2.03 m)	220 lb (100 kg)	1965–09–25	Central Arkansas
PF	91	Dennis Rodman	6 ft 8 in (2.03 m)	210 lb (95 kg)	1961–05–13	SE Oklahoma State
C	34	Bill Wennington	7 ft 0 in (2.13 m)	245 lb (111 kg)	1963–04–26	St. John's

Coaches
Head coach
- Phil Jackson
Assistant(s)
- Bill Cartwright
- Frank Hamblen
- Jim Rodgers
- Tex Winter

Legend
- (DP) Unsigned draft pick
- (FA) Free agent
- (S) Suspended
- Injured

Roster

=== Utah Jazz ===
1997–98 Utah Jazz roster
Players

Pos.	No.	Player	Height	Weight	DOB	From
SG	40	Shandon Anderson	6 ft 6 in (1.98 m)	208 lb (94 kg)	1973–12–31	Georgia
PF	55	Antoine Carr	6 ft 9 in (2.06 m)	225 lb (102 kg)	1961–07–23	Wichita State
PG	10	Howard Eisley	6 ft 2 in (1.88 m)	177 lb (80 kg)	1972–12–04	Boston College
C	44	Greg Foster	6 ft 11 in (2.11 m)	240 lb (109 kg)	1968–10–03	UTEP
SG	14	Jeff Hornacek	6 ft 3 in (1.91 m)	190 lb (86 kg)	1963–05–03	Iowa State
PG	25	Troy Hudson	6 ft 1 in (1.85 m)	170 lb (77 kg)	1976–03–13	Southern Illinois
SF	31	Adam Keefe	6 ft 9 in (2.06 m)	230 lb (104 kg)	1970–02–22	Stanford
PF	32	Karl Malone	6 ft 9 in (2.06 m)	250 lb (113 kg)	1963–07–24	Louisiana Tech
SF	34	Chris Morris	6 ft 8 in (2.03 m)	210 lb (95 kg)	1966–01–20	Auburn
C	00	Greg Ostertag	7 ft 2 in (2.18 m)	280 lb (127 kg)	1973–03–06	Kansas
SF	3	Bryon Russell	6 ft 7 in (2.01 m)	225 lb (102 kg)	1970–12–31	Long Beach State
PG	12	John Stockton	6 ft 1 in (1.85 m)	170 lb (77 kg)	1962–03–26	Gonzaga
PG	11	Jacque Vaughn	6 ft 1 in (1.85 m)	190 lb (86 kg)	1975–02–11	Kansas

Coaches
Head coach
- Jerry Sloan
Assistant(s)
- Gordon Chiesa
- David Fredman
- Phil Johnson
- Kenny Natt

Legend
- (DP) Unsigned draft pick
- (FA) Free agent
- (S) Suspended
- Injured

Roster

== Series summary ==
Game	Date	Road team	Result	Home team
Game 1	June 3	Chicago Bulls	85–88 (OT) (0–1)	Utah Jazz
Game 2	June 5	Chicago Bulls	93–88 (1–1)	Utah Jazz
Game 3	June 7	Utah Jazz	54–96 (1–2)	Chicago Bulls
Game 4	June 10	Utah Jazz	82–86 (1–3)	Chicago Bulls
Game 5	June 12	Utah Jazz	83–81 (2–3)	Chicago Bulls
Game 6	June 14	Chicago Bulls	87–86 (4–2)	Utah Jazz

Bulls win the series 4–2.

=== Game 1 ===
NBC

June 3

Boxscore

Chicago Bulls 85, Utah Jazz 88 (OT)
Scoring by quarter: 17–17, 23–28, 19–22, 20–12, Overtime: 6–9
Pts: Michael Jordan 33; Rebs: Pippen, Longley 8 Asts: Steve Kerr 5	Pts: John Stockton 24; Rebs: Karl Malone 14; Asts: John Stockton 8
Utah leads the series, 1–0

Delta Center, Salt Lake City, Utah
Attendance: 19,911
Referees:
- Ron Garretson
- Steve Javie
- Bennett Salvatore

=== Game 2 ===
NBC

June 5

Boxscore

Chicago Bulls 93, Utah Jazz 88
Scoring by quarter: 23–20, 27–26, 20–27, 23–15
Pts: Michael Jordan 37; Rebs: Kukoč, Rodman 9 Asts: Scottie Pippen 4	Pts: Jeff Hornacek 20; Rebs: Karl Malone 12; Asts: John Stockton 7
Series tied, 1–1

Delta Center, Salt Lake City, Utah
Attendance: 19,911
Referees:
- Danny Crawford
- Joe Crawford
- Bill Oakes

=== Game 3 ===
NBC

June 7

Boxscore

Utah Jazz 54, Chicago Bulls 96
Scoring by quarter: 14–17, 17–32, 14–23, 9–24
Pts: Karl Malone 22; Rebs: Greg Ostertag 9 Asts: John Stockton 7	Pts: Michael Jordan 24; Rebs: Ron Harper 10; Asts: Ron Harper 7
Chicago leads series, 2–1

United Center, Chicago, Illinois
Attendance: 23,844
Referees:
- Dick Bavetta
- Hue Hollins
- Ronnie Nunn

=== Game 4 ===
NBC

June 10

Boxscore

Utah Jazz 82, Chicago Bulls 86
Scoring by quarter: 19–21, 18–18, 20–22, 25–25
Pts: Karl Malone 21; Rebs: Karl Malone 14; Asts: John Stockton 13	Pts: Michael Jordan 34; Rebs: Dennis Rodman 14; Asts: Scottie Pippen 5
Chicago leads series, 3–1

United Center, Chicago, Illinois
Attendance: 23,844
Referees:
- Hugh Evans
- Steve Javie
- Jack Nies

Crowd: 24,000 at United Center (sellout)

=== Game 5 ===
NBC

June 12

Boxscore

Utah Jazz 83, Chicago Bulls 81
Scoring by quarter: 16–18, 14–18, 29–19, 24–26
Pts: Karl Malone 39; Rebs: Karl Malone 9 Asts: John Stockton 12	Pts: Toni Kukoč 30; Rebs: Scottie Pippen 11; Asts: Scottie Pippen 11
Chicago leads series, 3–2

United Center, Chicago, Illinois
Attendance: 23,844
Referees:
- Joe Crawford
- Bill Oakes
- Bennett Salvatore

To date, this is the most recent NBA Finals game played in Chicago.

=== Game 6 ===
NBC

June 14

Boxscore

Chicago Bulls 87, Utah Jazz 86
Scoring by quarter: 22–25, 23–24, 16–17, 26–20
Pts: Michael Jordan 45; Rebs: Dennis Rodman 8 Asts: Kukoč, Pippen 4	Pts: Karl Malone 31; Rebs: Karl Malone 11; Asts: Karl Malone 7
Chicago wins NBA Finals, 4–2

Delta Center, Salt Lake City, Utah
Attendance: 19,911
Referees:
- Dick Bavetta
- Danny Crawford
- Hue Hollins

External videos
- Full game broadcast by NBC on YouTube

To date, this is the most recent NBA Finals game played in Salt Lake City.

== Game summaries ==
=== Games 1 and 2 ===
Unlike the 1997 Finals, the Jazz and Bulls entered this series as equals. The Jazz had won both regular season meetings with the Bulls, and many analysts predicted a hard-fought seven-game series. The two teams entered the Finals on completely different notes; the Jazz uneventfully swept the Los Angeles Lakers in the Western Conference finals and had a total of ten days' rest before the Finals began. The Bulls, meanwhile, endured a hard-fought series against a resurgent Indiana Pacers team helmed by Larry Bird (in his first year as head coach). They would need all seven games to get past the Pacers and would have only two days' rest before having to travel to Utah. Predictions of a Jazz championship were strengthened with their 88–85 Game 1 victory in overtime in Utah, with Scottie Pippen just missing a 3-pointer at the buzzer. True to form, the Bulls tied the series in Game 2 while putting together a huge fourth-quarter run to silence the Delta Center and holding on to win 93–88, finally securing their first victory against Utah all season. Karl Malone shot very poorly in the first two games of the series with some misses including one layup in Game 2 that hit the underside of the rim.

=== Games 3–5 ===
The Finals moved to Chicago with control of the series at stake in Game 3. In a 96–54 loss, the Jazz set the record for the 42-point loss in Finals history and were hammered by the media for the score, as well as the lowest number of points scored in any NBA game (since eclipsed by a score of 49 from the Bulls on April 10, 1999) since the inception of the shot clock. Every player on the Bulls roster scored at least once, with the Bulls' last-remaining scoreless player, backup center Bill Wennington, nailing his bucket with only 5.2 seconds remaining in the game.

Chicago won Game 4 in a close game, 86–82, and Utah took Game 5 83–81 despite nearly blowing a seven-point lead in the last two minutes. Karl Malone had his best game of the series with 39 points, while Antoine Carr made all five of his field goal attempts. The series returned to Utah with the Bulls leading 3–2.

=== Game 6 - "The Last Shot" ===
External videos
- Full game broadcast by NBC on YouTube

As the Bulls arrived at Delta Center for Game 6, they had to face a significant challenge. Scottie Pippen, whose back was already injured going into the game, aggravated his injury when he dunked the opening basket of the game. He scored only 8 points the whole game. To keep pace with Utah, the Bulls were forced to rely almost entirely on Michael Jordan, who scored 23 points in the first half. Emotions ran high at the Delta Center when the Jazz suffered a critical shot clock violation in the second quarter. Referee Dick Bavetta ruled that Howard Eisley did not get a successful 3-point shot off in time, although TV replays showed that the ball was out of Eisley's hands just before the shot clock hit zero. Later in the fourth quarter, Jordan's two free throws tied the game with only a minute left. The Jazz received some relief as John Stockton hit a three-pointer with 41.9 seconds left to give Utah an 86–83 lead and sent the Delta Center into a frenzy.

After Jordan made a layup to make it 86–85, the Bulls needed to stop the Jazz from scoring again. When John Stockton passed the ball to Karl Malone, Jordan stole the ball away and dribbled down the court. Guarding him was Bryon Russell, one of the Jazz's best defenders. With 10 seconds remaining, Jordan started to dribble right, then crossed over to his left, possibly pushing off on Russell as he did so. Now wide open, Jordan buried a 20-foot jumper to give the Bulls an 87–86 lead with 5.2 seconds remaining. After a time-out, Stockton missed a potential game-winning 3-pointer, giving the Bulls their sixth NBA title in eight years. Jordan, who scored 45 points, and whose game-winning shot has been immortalized around the world, was named Finals MVP for the sixth time.

== Player statistics ==
Legend
GP	Games played	GS	Games started	MPG	Minutes per game
FG%	Field-goal percentage	3P%	3-point field-goal percentage	FT%	Free-throw percentage
RPG	Rebounds per game	APG	Assists per game	SPG	Steals per game
BPG	Blocks per game	PPG	Points per game

Chicago Bulls statistics
Player	GP	GS	MPG	FG%	3P%	FT%	RPG	APG	SPG	BPG	PPG
Randy Brown	2	0	3.5	.333	.000	.000	1.0	0.0	0.5	0.0	1.0
Jud Buechler	6	0	5.2	.600	.667	.000	0.3	0.3	0.2	0.2	1.3
Scott Burrell	6	0	14.0	.409	.250	.667	2.5	0.0	1.2	0.0	3.5
Ron Harper	6	6	28.7	.364	.167	.583	4.5	2.8	1.5	0.7	5.3
Michael Jordan	6	6	41.7	.427	.308	.814	4.0	2.3	1.8	0.7	33.5
Steve Kerr	6	0	20.7	.350	.385	1.000	0.3	2.5	0.3	0.0	3.8
Toni Kukoč	6	6	37.0	.500	.304	.615	4.7	2.7	1.2	0.7	15.2
Luc Longley	6	6	21.7	.444	.000	.750	4.8	1.5	0.8	0.8	5.0
Scottie Pippen	6	6	39.5	.410	.231	.833	6.8	4.8	1.7	0.8	15.7
Dennis Rodman	6	0	30.5	.462	.000	.667	8.3	1.0	1.2	0.3	3.3
Bill Wennington	3	0	4.3	.400	.000	.000	1.0	0.3	0.0	0.3	1.3

Utah Jazz statistics
Player	GP	GS	MPG	FG%	3P%	FT%	RPG	APG	SPG	BPG	PPG
Shandon Anderson	6	0	21.0	.500	.333	.818	2.7	0.3	0.2	0.2	7.3
Antoine Carr	6	0	14.3	.500	.000	.750	2.0	0.0	0.0	0.2	4.2
Howard Eisley	6	0	17.5	.375	.143	1.000	2.0	3.8	0.3	0.2	4.7
Greg Foster	6	2	10.5	.267	.000	.000	2.3	0.0	0.2	0.3	1.3
Jeff Hornacek	6	6	34.2	.411	.333	.833	2.7	2.7	0.8	0.2	10.7
Adam Keefe	5	3	12.0	.429	.000	.500	3.4	0.2	0.4	0.0	2.8
Karl Malone	6	6	40.5	.504	.000	.789	10.5	3.8	1.0	1.2	25.0
Chris Morris	6	0	17.5	.393	.000	.667	2.5	0.5	0.3	0.2	4.3
Greg Ostertag	5	1	11.0	.417	.000	1.000	3.2	0.0	0.0	0.2	2.2
Bryon Russell	6	6	36.0	.409	.286	.688	5.0	1.3	1.2	0.2	8.8
John Stockton	6	6	32.3	.490	.222	.727	2.5	8.7	2.0	0.0	9.7
Jacque Vaughn	1	0	7.0	.000	.000	.000	2.0	0.0	0.0	0.0	0.0

== Media coverage ==
The Finals were televised in the United States by NBC (including for the second straight year WMAQ-TV in Chicago and KSL-TV in Salt Lake City), with Bob Costas on play-by-play and Doug Collins and Isiah Thomas serving as color analysts. Hannah Storm hosted the pre-game show, assisted by Bill Walton, John Salley and Peter Vescey, and Ahmad Rashad and Jim Gray reported from the sidelines. This was the first time since NBC took over the broadcasting rights to the NBA Finals in 1991 that Marv Albert was not the play by play commentator. He was fired from NBC on September 25, 1997, for sexually assaulting a woman.

== Legacy and aftermath ==
World Championship Wrestling would capitalize on the animosity following the Finals between Dennis Rodman and Karl Malone, as on July 12, 1998, Rodman and Hollywood Hogan would defeat Malone and Diamond Dallas Page in a tag team match at Bash at the Beach.

As of the 2024–25 season, this series remains the last Finals appearances for both the Bulls and Jazz. After the season, the Bulls dynasty broke up. Without its key personnel, the Bulls missed the playoffs in the lockout-shortened 1999 season, winning just 13 of 50 games; the Bulls would later go on to win the draft lottery and select Elton Brand as the first overall pick in that season's draft, making them the only team to win the draft lottery after winning an NBA championship in the previous season. The Bulls would not make the postseason again until 2005. Both teams have made just one Conference Finals appearance since this Finals, with the Jazz qualifying in 2007, losing to the San Antonio Spurs, and the Bulls qualifying in 2011 under MVP Derrick Rose, losing to the Miami Heat.

Phil Jackson declined an offer from the team president to coach another season. He would come back as head coach of the Los Angeles Lakers in 1999, winning five NBA titles in two separate stints with the team before retiring in 2011. This would give Jackson 11 NBA Titles, the most for a coach in the history of the four major American sports leagues. Ron Harper followed Jackson to the Lakers and won championships during his final two seasons in 2000 and 2001 (other Bulls dynasty alum were on those teams, such as John Salley and Horace Grant).

On January 13, 1999, Michael Jordan announced his retirement for the second time; he would come out of retirement for the second and final time in 2001 with the Washington Wizards and played two seasons with the team. However, neither season ended with a playoff appearance. Scottie Pippen was traded to the Houston Rockets during the offseason and played his last season (2003–04) with the Bulls and also played for the Portland Trail Blazers. Dennis Rodman, released by the Bulls in the offseason, signed with the Lakers mid-season, playing only 23 games before being released. In January 1999, the Bulls re-signed Steve Kerr and traded him to the San Antonio Spurs, where he would win two more championships in 1999 and 2003, his last year in the NBA. After turning down Phil Jackson's offer to coach the New York Knicks (Jackson was the president of basketball operations of the team), Kerr would go on to win four championships as head coach of the Golden State Warriors in 2015, 2017, 2018, and 2022. Both Pippen and Kerr played opposite of former coach Phil Jackson's Lakers in multiple playoff series in the early 2000s.

John Stockton and Karl Malone led the Jazz to playoff appearances each season through 2003, however each season featured a loss in the first or second round. During the 2003 off-season, Stockton retired and Malone joined the Los Angeles Lakers. Malone returned to the NBA Finals in 2004 where he would lose to the Detroit Pistons in 5 games. Jerry Sloan would coach the Jazz until his retirement in 2011.

The Jazz were the last non California or Texas Western Conference NBA Finals team until the 2012 Oklahoma City Thunder, a span of 14 years.

Michael Jordan's 1998 NBA Finals ‘The Last Dance’ game worn jersey sold for $10,091,000 in 2022, a record for an NBA jersey.

== The Last Dance documentary ==
In 2020, The Last Dance was a documentary miniseries co-produced by ESPN Films and Netflix; a series that revolved around Michael Jordan's career, with particular focus on the 1997–98 season, his final season with the Chicago Bulls. The series was met with critical acclaim, with praise for its directing and editing, and also for the timing of the release - during the initial weeks of quarantine during the COVID-19 pandemic when viewers were struggling to find entertainment. The Last Dance won the Primetime Emmy Award for Outstanding Documentary or Nonfiction Series at the 72nd Primetime Emmy Awards.

Additionally, a cinematic presentation of Game 6 was released by ESPN after the final episode.

== See also ==
- 1998 NBA playoffs
- The Last Shot
- The Last Dance
