= Jerry Sloan =

American basketball player and coach (1942–2020)

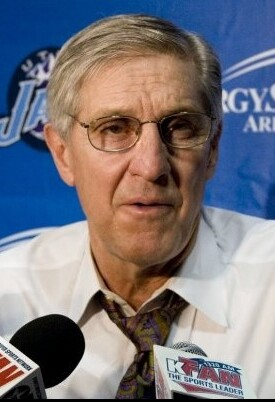
- Sloan in 2008

Personal information
- Born: March 28, 1942 McLeansboro, Illinois, U.S.
- Died: May 22, 2020 (aged 78) Salt Lake City, Utah, U.S.
- Listed height: 6 ft 5 in (1.96 m)
- Listed weight: 195 lb (88 kg)

Career information
- High school: McLeansboro (McLeansboro, Illinois)
- College: Evansville (1962–1965)
- NBA draft: 1965: 1st round, 4th overall pick
- Drafted by: Baltimore Bullets
- Playing career: 1965–1976
- Position: Shooting guard
- Number: 14, 4
- Coaching career: 1978–2011

Career history

Playing
- 1965–1966: Baltimore Bullets
- 1966–1976: Chicago Bulls

Career highlights
- As player: 2× NBA All-Star (1967, 1969); 4× NBA All-Defensive First Team (1969, 1972, 1974–1975); 2× NBA All-Defensive Second Team (1970–1971); No. 4 retired by Chicago Bulls; 2× NCAA College Division champion (1964, 1965); 2× NCAA College Division Tournament MOP (1964, 1965); 2× ICC Player of the Year (1963, 1965); 3× First-team All-ICC (1963–1965); No. 52 jersey retired by Evansville Purple Aces; As coach: Chuck Daly Lifetime Achievement Award (2017); Top 15 Coaches in NBA History; No. 1223 honored by Utah Jazz

Career playing statistics
- Points: 10,571 (14.0 ppg)
- Rebounds: 5,615 (7.4 rpg)
- Assists: 1,925 (2.5 apg)
- Stats at NBA.com
- Stats at Basketball Reference

Career coaching record
- NBA: 1,221–803 (.603)
- Record at Basketball Reference
- Basketball Hall of Fame
Medals
Assistant coach for United States
men's national basketball team
Olympic Games
| Gold medal – first place | 1996 Atlanta | Team |

Gerald Eugene Sloan (March 28, 1942 – May 22, 2020) was an American professional basketball player and coach. He played 11 seasons in the National Basketball Association (NBA) before beginning a 30-year coaching career, 23 of which were spent as head coach of the Utah Jazz (1988–2011). NBA commissioner David Stern referred to Sloan as "one of the greatest and most respected coaches in NBA history". Sloan was inducted into the Naismith Memorial Basketball Hall of Fame in 2009.

After playing college basketball with the Evansville Purple Aces, Sloan was selected by the Baltimore Bullets with the fourth overall pick of the 1965 NBA draft. He spent his rookie season with the Bullets before playing the remainder of his career with the Chicago Bulls, retiring due to injuries in 1976. Nicknamed "the Original Bull", he was a two-time NBA All-Star, a six-time member of the All-Defensive Team and the first player to have his number retired by the Bulls. Sloan then became a coach, and had a career regular-season win–loss record of 1,221–803, placing him third all-time in NBA wins at the time he retired. He was the fifth coach to reach 1,000 NBA victories and is one of two coaches in NBA history to record 1,000 wins with one club (the Utah Jazz). Sloan coached the Jazz to 15 consecutive playoff appearances from 1989 to 2003. He is one of only four coaches in NBA history with 15-plus consecutive seasons that have a winning record. (Note: Gregg Popovich, Pat Riley and Phil Jackson are the others.) He led Utah to the NBA Finals in 1997 and 1998, but lost to Chicago both times.

After Tom Kelly stepped down as manager of the Minnesota Twins in Major League Baseball in 2001, Sloan became the longest-tenured head coach in American major league sports with their current franchise. He resigned mid-season from the Jazz in 2011 before returning in 2013 as an adviser and scouting consultant.

== Early life ==
Born and raised in Gobbler's Knob, Illinois, 15 miles (24 km) south of McLeansboro, Sloan was the youngest of 10 children and was raised by a single mother after his father died when Jerry was 4 years old. He would wake up at 4:30 a.m. to do farm chores and then walk almost two miles to get to school in time for 7 a.m. basketball practice. After school, he would walk back home from practice. Sloan graduated an all-state player from McLeansboro High School in 1960.

== College career ==
Sloan first enrolled at the University of Illinois at Urbana-Champaign, withdrew, enrolled at Southern Illinois University, and withdrew once more before attending Evansville, where he played college basketball for the Evansville Purple Aces from 1962 to 1965, where he was named the Indiana Collegiate Conference (ICC) Player of the Year in 1963 and 1965 and a three-time first-team All-ICC selection. He was chosen as the 19th overall pick in the 1964 NBA draft by the Baltimore Bullets but he remained in college and led the Purple Aces to their second in two consecutive Division II national titles.

== Professional career ==
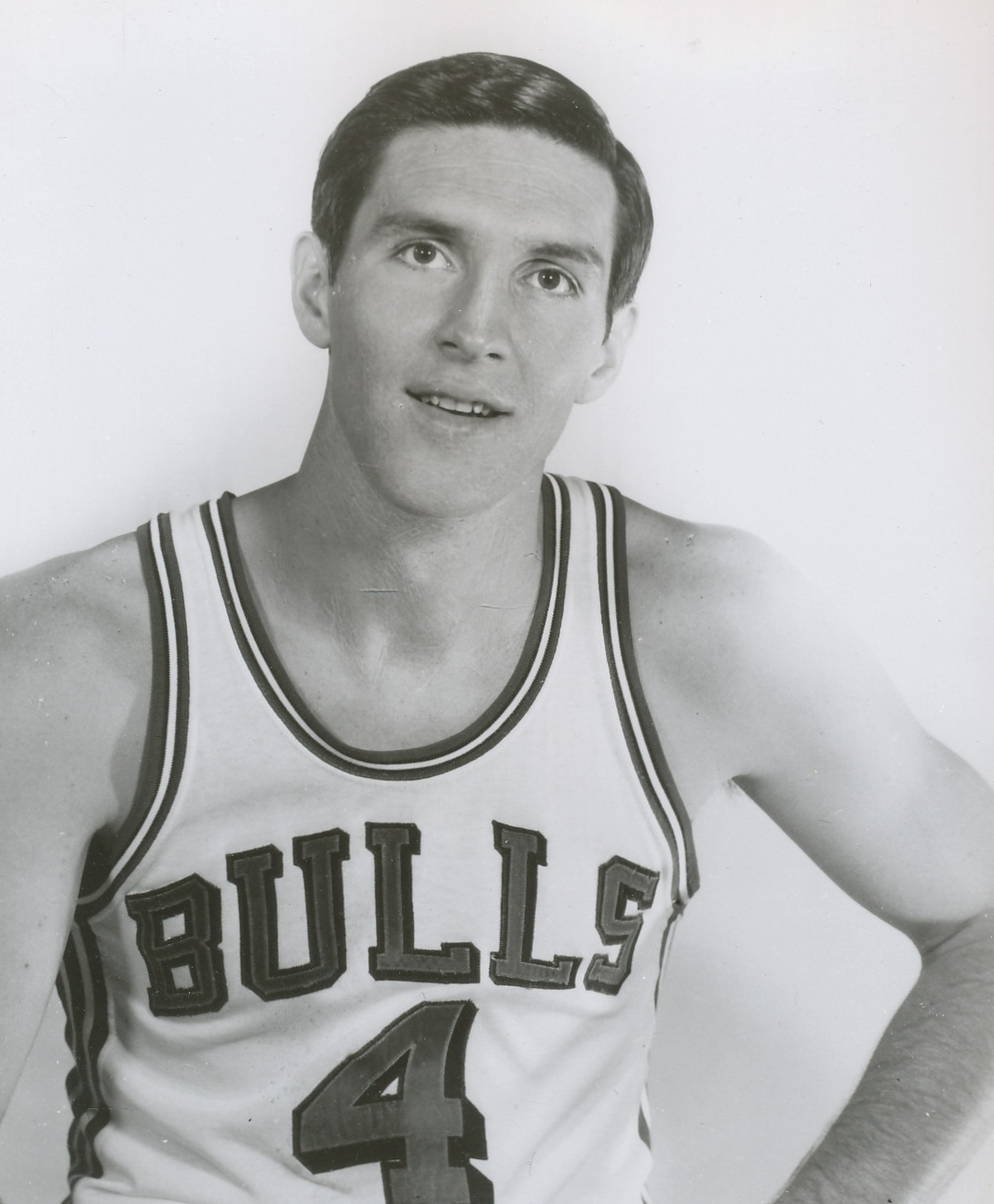
Sloan as a player of the Chicago Bulls in 1969

Sloan was selected fourth in the 1965 NBA draft by the Baltimore Bullets. The Chicago Bulls, an expansion team, selected Sloan in the 1966 NBA expansion draft. He became known as "the Original Bull", known for his tenacious defense, leading them to the playoffs in their first season, and to their first and only division title before the Michael Jordan era; after a series of knee injuries, he retired in 1976. He averaged more than 18 points a game in 1970–71, and over 15 points per game three other seasons. Sloan's scored a career high of 43 points in a win against the Milwaukee Bucks on March 5, 1969. Despite his height of only 6 ft 5 in (1.96 m), his career rebounding average was 7.4 rebounds per game, with one season having an average of 9.1 rebounds. He was a career 72 percent free throw shooter. His number 4 jersey was subsequently retired by the Chicago Bulls in 1978, becoming the first retired jersey in franchise history.

== Coaching career ==
While at Evansville, coach Arad McCutchan suggested that Sloan coach at his alma mater. After retiring in 1976, Sloan took the Evansville job, but withdrew after five days. That same season, the Evansville basketball team and coaching staff were killed in a plane crash at Evansville Airport.

Two years later, Sloan was hired by the Bulls as a scout. After one season in this role, he became an assistant coach with the team. In 1979, Sloan was promoted to the position of head coach. He held the position for less than three seasons, winning 94 games and losing 121. He led the team to the playoffs in his second year, but was fired after a poor start during the following campaign.

=== Utah Jazz ===
After departing Chicago, Sloan became a scout for the Utah Jazz for one season. He then became coach of the Evansville Thunder of the Continental Basketball Association for the 1984 season but never coached a game instead accepting an assistant coach position with the Jazz.

After Frank Layden became team president in December 1988, the Jazz chose Sloan as the new head coach. Sloan enjoyed a successful run of 16 consecutive seasons of taking his team to the playoffs, during which time he coached future Hall of Famers Karl Malone and John Stockton, along with other All-Star-level players including Jeff Hornacek, Antoine Carr, Tom Chambers, Mark Eaton, and Jeff Malone. Sloan led the Jazz to six division championships and 10 seasons with greater than 50 wins. After advancing to the Western Conference finals three times (1992, 1994 and 1996) but getting eliminated each time, the Jazz reached the NBA Finals twice, losing in 1997 and 1998, both times to his old team, the Chicago Bulls which were led by superstars Michael Jordan and Scottie Pippen and coached by Phil Jackson. By the end of this period, he had joined Pat Riley and Phil Jackson as the only coaches with 10 or more seasons winning 50 or more games.

After the retirement of Stockton and Malone's departure to the Los Angeles Lakers, Sloan coached a younger group of players, including Carlos Boozer, Andrei Kirilenko, Mehmet Okur, and later, Deron Williams. After John Stockton retired and Karl Malone signed with the Lakers in the summer of 2003, the 2003-2004 Jazz were widely predicted to be the worst team in the NBA and some even predicted that Utah would set the all-time single season record for fewest wins in a season. Despite the very low expectations and despite second leading scorer Matt Harpring being sidelined for 51 games due to a knee injury, Sloan and his team were involved in a battle for the eighth spot in the Western Conference, which would have given Sloan his 17th straight trip to the playoffs. The Jazz were tied with the Denver Nuggets for the eighth and last spot of the playoffs with three games to go in the regular season. The Jazz lost the final two games, causing Sloan to miss the playoffs for the first time in 18 seasons as Jazz coach. After leading a young team in its first year without Stockton and Malone to an unexpected 42–40 record, he finished just behind Hubie Brown of the Memphis Grizzlies in voting for the 2004 NBA Coach of the Year Award.

Sloan collected his 1,000th career win against the Dallas Mavericks on December 11, 2006, in a 101–79 victory, which made him only the fifth coach in NBA history to reach the milestone. After disappointing seasons in 2004–05 and 2005–06, the Jazz in the 2006–07 returned to contention. For this, Sloan was again on many sportswriters' ballots for Coach of the Year, however, he lost the award to Toronto Raptors head coach Sam Mitchell, who led his team to a franchise record-tying 47 victories and their first Atlantic Division title. Sloan lost the vote 394–301.

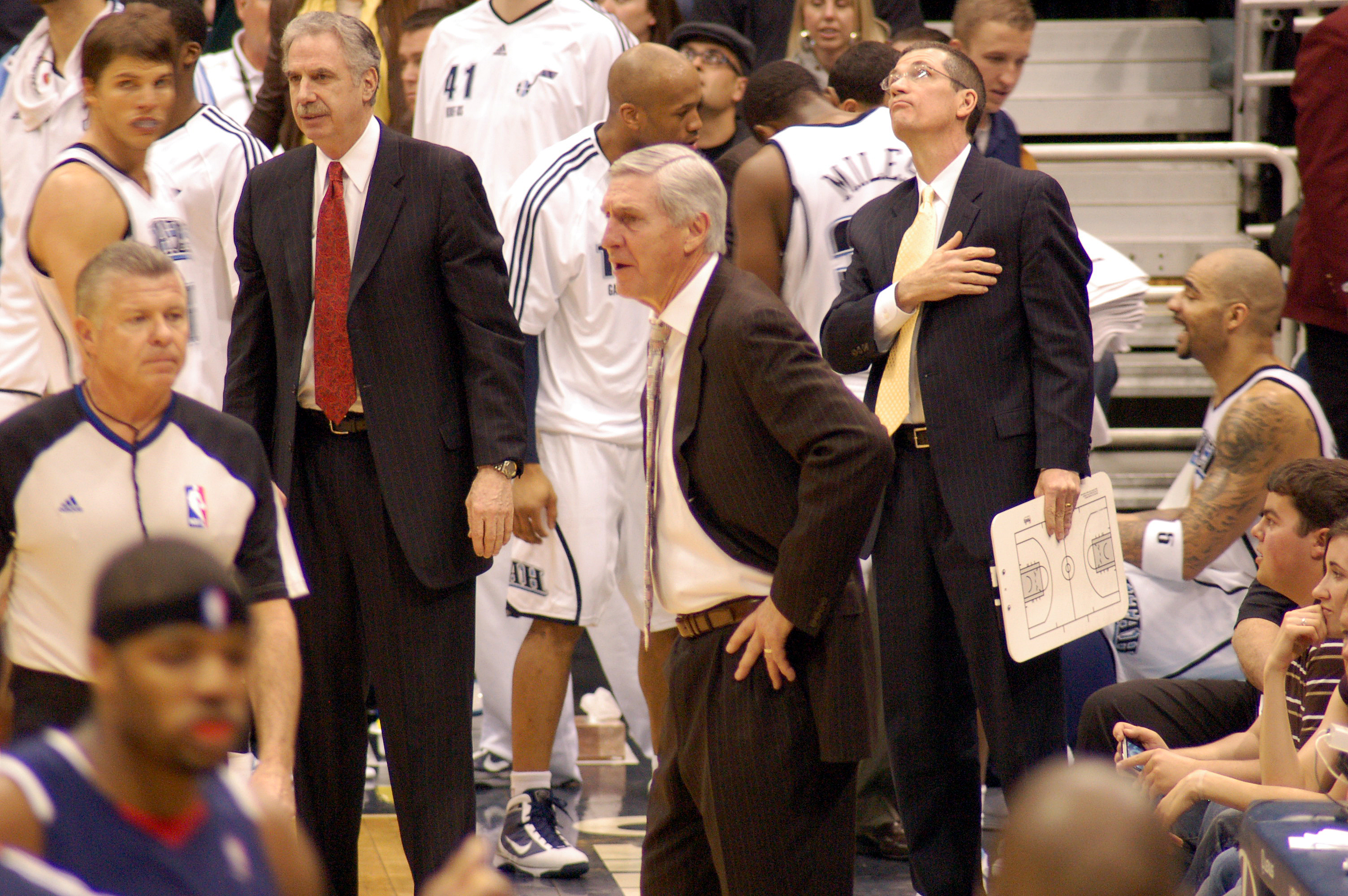
Sloan as a coach of the Utah Jazz in 2010

The Jazz advanced to the Western Conference finals on May 15, 2007, with a 100–87 win over the Golden State Warriors. It was the sixth time in franchise history that Utah advanced to the conference finals, all coming under Sloan. However, they went on to lose 4–1 to the San Antonio Spurs.

During the 2008–09 season, Sloan reached 1,000 wins as coach of the Jazz on November 7 after beating the Oklahoma City Thunder 104–97 in a Friday night game. He became the first coach in NBA history with 1,000 wins for one team. Sloan returned as head coach of the Jazz for the 2009–10 season, leading the team to a 53–29 record and the playoffs.

Mirroring his tenacity as a player, Sloan was just as fiery as a coach. He was suspended one game for pushing referee Bob Delaney in April 1993. A decade later, Sloan was served a seven-game suspension in 2003 for pushing referee Courtney Kirkland in Sacramento.

In April 2009, Sloan was named to the Naismith Memorial Basketball Hall of Fame, in the same class as his former longtime point guard John Stockton. Sloan chose the class of 2006 Hall of Famer Charles Barkley to introduce him during his induction ceremony.

==== Resignation as Jazz head coach ====
Sloan revealed on February 7, 2011, that he had earlier in the year signed a contract extension to coach the Jazz for the 2011–12 season, which would have been his 24th season as head coach with the Jazz. However, on February 10, 2011, Sloan and assistant Phil Johnson resigned their positions effective immediately. Sloan downplayed reports that conflicts with players prompted his departure. "I've had confrontations with players since I've been in the league", Sloan said. "There's only so much energy left and my energy has dropped." KSL-TV later asked Sloan whether reported conflicts with guard Deron Williams forced him to leave. "I forced myself out", Sloan responded. Williams acknowledged that he had a disagreement with Sloan during the previous night's game, but he added, "I would never force Coach Sloan out of Utah. He's meant more to this town, more to this organization than I have by far. I would have asked out of Utah first." Sloan's last game as head coach came in a 91–86 loss to the Bulls on February 9, and assistant coach Tyrone Corbin was then named as Sloan's replacement.

He was stubborn, you have to be as a coach. But, he had a system, and the system was effective. It's not easy to have a team in Utah. It's not the biggest draw in the country as far as free agents to go there, and they were able to have a really great home record, played the kind of basketball that was admirable. So, we all had admiration for him as coaches around the league. So, as a colleague, we'll miss him.

— Phil Jackson, former Chicago Bulls and Los Angeles Lakers head coach

Nearly two weeks later, Williams was involved in a trade on February 23, 2011, that sent him to the New Jersey Nets. Ian Thomsen of Sports Illustrated wrote, "First Jerry Sloan leaves, now Williams is sent away. For two decades we knew who the Utah Jazz were and what they stood for as a franchise. Now we, and they, can have no idea."

A year later, Karl Malone, who played under Sloan for over 18 years, indicated that Sloan did not feel supported by Kevin O'Connor and Greg Miller. Longtime San Antonio Spurs head coach Gregg Popovich would later mention him as a mentor for his overall coaching success in the NBA.

==== Return to the Jazz ====
On June 19, 2013, the Utah Jazz announced that Sloan was returning as an adviser and scouting consultant.

On January 31, 2014, the Jazz honored Sloan by raising a banner featuring the number "1223", which represents Sloan's total number of combined regular season and playoff wins with the Jazz from 1988 to 2011.

== Personal life and death ==
Sloan married his high-school sweetheart, Bobbye. After a much-publicized six-year battle against breast cancer, she died of pancreatic cancer in 2004. They had three children and were married 41 years.

In 2006, Sloan married Tammy Jessop, in Salt Lake City. Sloan had a stepson as a result of this marriage.

Sloan was known to wear John Deere hats, and collected antique furniture and dolls. He also collected and restored tractors as a hobby. After amassing a collection of 70 tractors, Sloan decided to sell all but two of them after a 35-year-old Allis-Chalmers tractor was stolen.

In April 2016, Sloan was diagnosed with Parkinson's disease and Lewy body dementia. He died on May 22, 2020, at age 78, from complications of the diseases.

== Career statistics ==
Legend
| GP | Games played | GS | Games started | MPG | Minutes per game |
| FG% | Field goal percentage | 3P% | 3-point field goal percentage | FT% | Free throw percentage |
| RPG | Rebounds per game | APG | Assists per game | SPG | Steals per game |
| BPG | Blocks per game | PPG | Points per game | **Bold** | Career high |

=== Playing ===
NBA regular season playing statistics
| Year | Team | GP | GS | MPG | FG% | FT% | RPG | APG | SPG | BPG | PPG |
|---|---|---|---|---|---|---|---|---|---|---|---|
| 1965–66 | Baltimore | 59 | – | 16.1 | .415 | .705 | 3.9 | 1.9 | – | – | 5.7 |
| 1966–67 | Chicago | 80 | – | 36.8 | .432 | **.796** | **9.1** | 2.1 | – | – | 17.4 |
| 1967–68 | Chicago | 77 | – | 31.9 | .385 | .749 | 7.7 | 3.0 | – | – | 13.3 |
| 1968–69 | Chicago | 78 | – | 37.7 | .417 | .745 | 7.9 | **3.5** | – | – | 16.8 |
| 1969–70 | Chicago | 53 | – | 34.4 | .421 | .651 | 7.0 | 3.1 | – | – | 15.6 |
| 1970–71 | Chicago | 80 | – | **39.3** | .441 | .715 | 8.8 | **3.5** | – | – | **18.3** |
| 1971–72 | Chicago | **82** | – | 37.0 | .444 | .660 | 8.4 | 2.6 | – | – | 16.2 |
| 1972–73 | Chicago | 69 | – | 35.0 | .411 | .707 | 6.9 | 2.2 | – | – | 10.1 |
| 1973–74 | Chicago | 77 | – | 37.1 | **.447** | .711 | 7.2 | 1.9 | **2.4** | .1 | 13.2 |
| 1974–75 | Chicago | 78 | – | 33.0 | .439 | .748 | 6.9 | 2.1 | 2.2 | **.2** | 12.2 |
| 1975–76 | Chicago | 22 | – | 28.0 | .400 | .705 | 5.3 | 1.0 | 1.2 | **.2** | 10.1 |
| Career | | 755 | – | 34.1 | .427 | .722 | 7.4 | 2.5 | 2.2 | .2 | 14.0 |
| All-Star | | 2 | 1 | 20.0 | .353 | .000 | 3.5 | 2.0 | – | – | 6.0 |

NBA playoff playing statistics
| Year | Team | GP | MPG | FG% | FT% | RPG | APG | SPG | BPG | PPG |
|---|---|---|---|---|---|---|---|---|---|---|
| 1966 | Baltimore | 2 | 17.0 | .417 | .750 | 8.0 | **3.0** | – | – | 6.5 |
| 1967 | Chicago | 3 | 23.7 | .387 | .667 | 3.3 | .3 | – | – | 10.0 |
| 1968 | Chicago | 5 | 27.4 | .324 | **.760** | 6.4 | 2.4 | – | – | 8.6 |
| 1970 | Chicago | 5 | 38.0 | .392 | .640 | 7.8 | 2.2 | – | – | 14.8 |
| 1971 | Chicago | 7 | 40.6 | .436 | .739 | 9.0 | 2.4 | – | – | **17.0** |
| 1972 | Chicago | 4 | **42.5** | .406 | .579 | 8.8 | 2.5 | – | – | 15.8 |
| 1973 | Chicago | 7 | 41.7 | .437 | .737 | 8.4 | 2.0 | – | – | 14.9 |
| 1974 | Chicago | 6 | 40.0 | .443 | .759 | **10.3** | 2.0 | 1.2 | **.2** | 16.7 |
| 1975 | Chicago | **13** | 36.2 | **.460** | .556 | 7.4 | 2.0 | **1.5** | .0 | 13.1 |
| Career | | 52 | 36.3 | .427 | .677 | 7.9 | 2.1 | 1.4 | .1 | 13.8 |

=== Coaching ===
Legend
| Regular season | G | Games coached | W | Games won | L | Games lost | W–L % | Win–loss % |
| Playoffs | PG | Playoff games | PW | Playoff wins | PL | Playoff losses | PW–L % | Playoff win–loss % |

NBA coaching record
| Team | Year | G | W | L | W–L% | Finish | PG | PW | PL | PW–L% | Result |
|---|---|---|---|---|---|---|---|---|---|---|---|
| Chicago | 1979–80 | 82 | 30 | 52 | .366 | 4th in Midwest | — | — | — | — | Missed Playoffs |
| Chicago | 1980–81 | 82 | 45 | 37 | .549 | 2nd in Central | 6 | 2 | 4 | .333 | Lost in Conf. Semi-finals |
| Chicago | 1981–82 | 51 | 19 | 32 | .373 | (fired) | — | — | — | — | — |
| Utah | 1988–89 | 65 | 40 | 25 | .615 | 1st in Midwest | 3 | 0 | 3 | .000 | Lost in First round |
| Utah | 1989–90 | 82 | 55 | 27 | .671 | 2nd in Midwest | 5 | 2 | 3 | .400 | Lost in First round |
| Utah | 1990–91 | 82 | 54 | 28 | .659 | 2nd in Midwest | 9 | 4 | 5 | .444 | Lost in Conf. Semi-finals |
| Utah | 1991–92 | 82 | 55 | 27 | .671 | 1st in Midwest | 16 | 9 | 7 | .563 | Lost in Conf. Finals |
| Utah | 1992–93 | 82 | 47 | 35 | .573 | 3rd in Midwest | 5 | 2 | 3 | .400 | Lost in First round |
| Utah | 1993–94 | 82 | 53 | 29 | .646 | 3rd in Midwest | 16 | 8 | 8 | .500 | Lost in Conf. Finals |
| Utah | 1994–95 | 82 | 60 | 22 | .732 | 2nd in Midwest | 5 | 2 | 3 | .400 | Lost in First round |
| Utah | 1995–96 | 82 | 55 | 27 | .671 | 2nd in Midwest | 18 | 10 | 8 | .556 | Lost in Conf. Finals |
| Utah | 1996–97 | 82 | 64 | 18 | .780 | 1st in Midwest | 20 | 13 | 7 | .650 | Lost in NBA Finals |
| Utah | 1997–98 | 82 | 62 | 20 | .756 | 1st in Midwest | 20 | 13 | 7 | .650 | Lost in NBA Finals |
| Utah | 1998–99 | 50 | 37 | 13 | .740 | 2nd in Midwest | 11 | 5 | 6 | .455 | Lost in Conf. Semi-finals |
| Utah | 1999–00 | 82 | 55 | 27 | .671 | 1st in Midwest | 10 | 4 | 6 | .400 | Lost in Conf. Semi-finals |
| Utah | 2000–01 | 82 | 53 | 29 | .646 | 2nd in Midwest | 5 | 2 | 3 | .400 | Lost in First round |
| Utah | 2001–02 | 82 | 44 | 38 | .537 | 4th in Midwest | 4 | 1 | 3 | .250 | Lost in First round |
| Utah | 2002–03 | 82 | 47 | 35 | .573 | 4th in Midwest | 5 | 1 | 4 | .200 | Lost in First round |
| Utah | 2003–04 | 82 | 42 | 40 | .512 | 7th in Midwest | — | — | — | — | Missed Playoffs |
| Utah | 2004–05 | 82 | 26 | 56 | .317 | 5th in Northwest | — | — | — | — | Missed Playoffs |
| Utah | 2005–06 | 82 | 41 | 41 | .500 | 2nd in Northwest | — | — | — | — | Missed Playoffs |
| Utah | 2006–07 | 82 | 51 | 31 | .622 | 1st in Northwest | 17 | 9 | 8 | .529 | Lost in Conf. Finals |
| Utah | 2007–08 | 82 | 54 | 28 | .659 | 1st in Northwest | 12 | 6 | 6 | .500 | Lost in Conf. Semi-finals |
| Utah | 2008–09 | 82 | 48 | 34 | .585 | 3rd in Northwest | 5 | 1 | 4 | .200 | Lost in First round |
| Utah | 2009–10 | 82 | 53 | 29 | .646 | 2nd in Northwest | 10 | 4 | 6 | .400 | Lost in Conf. Semi-finals |
| Utah | 2010–11 | 54 | 31 | 23 | .574 | (resigned) | — | — | — | — | — |
| Career | | 2,024 | 1,221 | 803 | .603 | | 202 | 98 | 104 | .485 | |

== Quotes ==
- "These guys have been criticized the last few years for not getting to where we're going, but I've always said that the most important thing in sports is to keep trying. Let this be an example of what it means to say it's never over."—after the Utah Jazz defeated the Houston Rockets in game 6 of the 1997 Western Conference finals.
- "I don't care if he's 19 or 30. If he's going to be on the floor in the NBA, he's got to be able to step up and get after it. We can't put diapers on him one night, and a jockstrap the next night. It's just the way it is."—on second year guard C. J. Miles, the youngest player on the 2006–07 Utah Jazz.
- "Size doesn't make any difference; heart is what makes a difference."
