= 1974 NBA playoffs =

Postseason tournament

Tournament details
- Dates: March 29–May 12, 1974
- Season: 1973–74
- Teams: 8

Final positions
- Champions: Boston Celtics (12th title)
- Runners-up: Milwaukee Bucks
- Semifinalists: Chicago Bulls; New York Knicks

The 1974 NBA playoffs was the postseason tournament of the National Basketball Association's 1973-74 season. The tournament concluded with the Eastern Conference champion Boston Celtics defeating the Western Conference champion Milwaukee Bucks 4 games to 3 in the NBA Finals. John Havlicek was named NBA Finals MVP.

It was the Celtics' twelfth NBA title, and first accomplished in the post-Bill Russell era. It was the last Finals appearance for Milwaukee until 2021.

This is the last postseason with only 3 rounds and using only 8 teams. The 1975 NBA Playoffs added a First Round and the number of teams was expanded to 10.

Using the revised playoff format adopted in 1973, two third-place teams (Buffalo in the Atlantic Division, Detroit in the Midwest Division) qualified for the playoffs, while the second-place finishers in the Central (Atlanta) and Pacific (Golden State) divisions did not. Also, since the top three Western qualifiers were in the Midwest Division, the two divisional champions in the Western Conference (Milwaukee and Los Angeles) played in the conference semifinals.

With a 4–3 series victory over the Pistons in the first round, the Bulls earned their first playoff series victory. In their first eight years of existence, the Bulls made the playoffs seven times.

The Bulls–Pistons rivalry started in their conference semifinal encounter, which Chicago won, 4–3. But it wasn't until the next four meetings (1988, 1989, 1990, and 1991) that the rivalry became even more intense, particularly due to the intense battles that made both teams legitimate contenders in the East.

As a matter of historical curiosity, 3 of the 4 teams in the 1974 Western Conference bracket (Milwaukee, Detroit and Chicago) now reside in the Eastern Conference.

This was the only appearance of the Capital Bullets in the playoffs under that moniker; they assumed the "Capital" name for one year before changing to the Washington Bullets the next season. It was the playoff debut of the Buffalo Braves, who had joined the league in 1970.

For the first time in BAA/NBA history (dating back to 1947), neither the Lakers (of Minneapolis, then Los Angeles) or Warriors (of Philadelphia, then San Francisco and Golden State) participated in a conference (or division prior to 1971) finals series.

== Bracket ==
Conference Semifinals
E1	Boston*	4
E4	Buffalo	2
Eastern Conference
E3	Capital*	3
E2	New York	4
W1	Milwaukee*	4
W4	Los Angeles*	1
Western Conference
W3	Detroit	3
W2	Chicago	4

Conference Finals
E1	Boston*	4
E2	New York	1
W1	Milwaukee*	4
W2	Chicago	0

NBA Finals
E1	Boston*	4
W1	Milwaukee*	3

- * Division winner
- Bold Series winner
- Italic Team with home-court advantage

== Conference semifinals ==
=== Eastern Conference semifinals ===
==== (1) Boston Celtics vs. (4) Buffalo Braves ====
March 30

Boxscore

Buffalo Braves 97, Boston Celtics 107
Scoring by quarter: 31–20, 19–21, 31–28, 16–38
Pts: Bob McAdoo 29; Rebs: Gar Heard 20; Asts: Ernie DiGregorio 8	Pts: Jo Jo White 24; Rebs: Dave Cowens 18; Asts: John Havlicek 12
Boston leads series, 1–0

Boston Garden, Boston, Massachusetts
Attendance: 14,300

April 2

Boxscore

Boston Celtics 105, Buffalo Braves 115
Scoring by quarter: 19–31, 30–20, 27–32, 29–32
Pts: Jo Jo White 27; Rebs: Dave Cowens 16; Asts: John Havlicek 7	Pts: Bob McAdoo 23; Rebs: Bob McAdoo 20; Asts: Ernie DiGregorio 12
Series tied, 1–1

Buffalo Memorial Auditorium, Buffalo, New York
Attendance: 17,507

April 3

Boxscore

Buffalo Braves 107, Boston Celtics 120
Scoring by quarter: 22–39, 31–27, 29–30, 25–24
Pts: Bob McAdoo 38; Rebs: Gar Heard 13; Asts: Ernie DiGregorio 8	Pts: John Havlicek 43; Rebs: Dave Cowens 19; Asts: John Havlicek 8
Boston leads series, 2–1

Boston Garden, Boston, Massachusetts
Attendance: 14,656

April 6

Boxscore

Boston Celtics 102, Buffalo Braves 104
Scoring by quarter: 22–22, 26–29, 26–21, 28–32
Pts: Don Nelson 24; Rebs: Dave Cowens 14; Asts: John Havlicek 8	Pts: Bob McAdoo 44; Rebs: Jim McMillian 18; Asts: Ernie DiGregorio 11
Series tied, 2–2

Buffalo Memorial Auditorium, Buffalo, New York
Attendance: 18,119

- Jim McMillian tip in at the buzzer.

April 9

Boxscore

Buffalo Braves 97, Boston Celtics 100
Scoring by quarter: 31–25, 20–23, 20–23, 26–29
Pts: Randy Smith 25; Rebs: Gar Heard 16; Asts: Ernie DiGregorio 4	Pts: John Havlicek 25; Rebs: Dave Cowens 12; Asts: Art Williams 8
Boston leads series, 3–2

Boston Garden, Boston, Massachusetts
Attendance: 15,320

April 12

Boxscore

Boston Celtics 106, Buffalo Braves 104
Scoring by quarter: 20–26, 33–28, 34–28, 19–22
Pts: John Havlicek 30; Rebs: Dave Cowens 17; Asts: John Havlicek 7	Pts: Bob McAdoo 40; Rebs: McAdoo, Heard 15 each Asts: Ernie DiGregorio 9
Boston wins series, 4–2

Buffalo Memorial Auditorium, Buffalo, New York
Attendance: 18,257

- Jo Jo White's free throws with no time left.

This was the first playoff meeting between these two teams.

==== (2) New York Knicks vs. (3) Capital Bullets ====
March 29

Boxscore

Capital Bullets 91, New York Knicks 102
Scoring by quarter: 26–20, 16–29, 22–25, 27–28
Pts: Elvin Hayes 40; Rebs: Elvin Hayes 14; Asts: Hayes, Porter 4 each	Pts: Walt Frazier 20; Rebs: Walt Frazier 12; Asts: Dave DeBusschere 7
New York leads series, 1–0

Madison Square Garden, New York City, New York
Attendance: 19,694

March 31

Boxscore

New York Knicks 87, Capital Bullets 99
Scoring by quarter: 26–25, 18–25, 22–20, 21–29
Pts: Dave DeBusschere 20; Rebs: Dave DeBusschere 10; Asts: Jerry Lucas 5	Pts: Phil Chenier 35; Rebs: Elvin Hayes 21; Asts: Kevin Porter 7
Series tied, 1–1

Capital Centre, Landover, Maryland
Attendance: 16,522

April 2

Boxscore

Capital Bullets 88, New York Knicks 79
Scoring by quarter: 23–21, 21–23, 26–13, 18–22
Pts: Kevin Porter 22; Rebs: Elvin Hayes 13; Asts: Kevin Porter 5	Pts: Walt Frazier 20; Rebs: Dave DeBusschere 12; Asts: DeBusschere, Meminger 5 each
Capital leads series, 2–1

Madison Square Garden, New York City, New York
Attendance: 19,694

April 5

Boxscore

New York Knicks 101, Capital Bullets 93 (OT)
Scoring by quarter: 29–30, 24–24, 15–22, 19–11, Overtime: 14–6
Pts: Earl Monroe 23; Rebs: Walt Frazier 11; Asts: Walt Frazier 6	Pts: Hayes, Porter 20 each Rebs: Elvin Hayes 17; Asts: Kevin Porter 7
Series tied, 2–2

Capital Centre, Landover, Maryland
Attendance: 19,035

April 7

Boxscore

Capital Bullets 105, New York Knicks 106
Scoring by quarter: 28–28, 24–27, 26–22, 27–29
Pts: Elvin Hayes 27; Rebs: Wes Unseld 12; Asts: Wes Unseld 8	Pts: Walt Frazier 38; Rebs: Dave DeBusschere 8 Asts: Walt Frazier 4
New York leads series, 3–2

Madison Square Garden, New York City, New York
Attendance: 19,694

April 10

Boxscore

New York Knicks 92, Capital Bullets 109
Scoring by quarter: 25–20, 19–24, 23–24, 25–41
Pts: Walt Frazier 25; Rebs: Phil Jackson 8 Asts: Walt Frazier 10	Pts: Elvin Hayes 31; Rebs: Elvin Hayes 23; Asts: Wes Unseld 5
Series tied, 3–3

Capital Centre, Landover, Maryland
Attendance: 19,025

April 12

Boxscore

Capital Bullets 81, New York Knicks 91
Scoring by quarter: 20–29, 31–24, 10–16, 20–22
Pts: Phil Chenier 21; Rebs: Phil Chenier 14; Asts: Elvin Hayes 5	Pts: Earl Monroe 30; Rebs: DeBusschere, Gianelli 15 each Asts: Dave DeBusschere 7
New York wins series, 4–3

Madison Square Garden, New York City, New York
Attendance: 19,694

This was the sixth playoff meeting between these two teams, with the Knicks winning four of the previous five meetings.

Previous playoff series
New York leads 4–1 in all-time playoff series

1969

Baltimore Bullets 0, New York Knicks 4

1969 Eastern Division Semifinals

1970

Baltimore Bullets 3, New York Knicks 4

1970 Eastern Division Semifinals

1971

Baltimore Bullets 4, New York Knicks 3

1971 Eastern Conference Finals

1972

Baltimore Bullets 2, New York Knicks 4

1972 Eastern Conference Semifinals

1973

Baltimore Bullets 1, New York Knicks 4

1973 Eastern Conference Semifinals

=== Western Conference semifinals ===
==== (1) Milwaukee Bucks vs. (4) Los Angeles Lakers ====
March 29

Boxscore

Los Angeles Lakers 95, Milwaukee Bucks 99
Scoring by quarter: 26–23, 23–24, 28–24, 18–28
Pts: Gail Goodrich 31; Rebs: Connie Hawkins 14; Asts: Gail Goodrich 6	Pts: Kareem Abdul-Jabbar 35; Rebs: Kareem Abdul-Jabbar 21; Asts: Oscar Robertson 9
Milwaukee leads series, 1–0

Milwaukee Arena, Milwaukee, Wisconsin
Attendance: 10,938

March 31

Boxscore

Los Angeles Lakers 90, Milwaukee Bucks 109
Scoring by quarter: 23–29, 25–21, 14–27, 28–32
Pts: Gail Goodrich 21; Rebs: Happy Hairston 10; Asts: Happy Hairston 7	Pts: Kareem Abdul-Jabbar 32; Rebs: Kareem Abdul-Jabbar 25; Asts: Oscar Robertson 9
Milwaukee leads series, 2–0

Milwaukee Arena, Milwaukee, Wisconsin
Attendance: 10,938

April 2

Boxscore

Milwaukee Bucks 96, Los Angeles Lakers 98
Scoring by quarter: 24–29, 31–23, 21–29, 20–17
Pts: Kareem Abdul-Jabbar 29; Rebs: Kareem Abdul-Jabbar 15; Asts: Oscar Robertson 16	Pts: Elmore Smith 30; Rebs: Elmore Smith 17; Asts: Gail Goodrich 12
Milwaukee leads series, 2–1

The Forum, Inglewood, California
Attendance: 17,505

- Jerry West’s final NBA game.

April 4

Boxscore

Milwaukee Bucks 112, Los Angeles Lakers 90
Scoring by quarter: 30–21, 22–18, 34–14, 26–37
Pts: Kareem Abdul-Jabbar 31; Rebs: Kareem Abdul-Jabbar 16; Asts: Oscar Robertson 9	Pts: Elmore Smith 20; Rebs: Elmore Smith 13; Asts: Connie Hawkins 5
Milwaukee leads series, 3–1

The Forum, Inglewood, California
Referees: Jake O'Donnell, Richie Powers, Paul Mihalak

April 7

Boxscore

Los Angeles Lakers 92, Milwaukee Bucks 114
Scoring by quarter: 16–33, 12–18, 26–36, 38–27
Pts: Gail Goodrich 22; Rebs: Happy Hairston 11; Asts: Gail Goodrich 6	Pts: Ron Williams 22; Rebs: Cornell Warner 17; Asts: Abdul-Jabbar, Robertson 8 each
Milwaukee wins series, 4–1

Milwaukee Arena, Milwaukee, Wisconsin
Attendance: 10,938

This was the third playoff meeting between these two teams, with both teams splitting the prior two meetings.

Previous playoff series
Tied 1–1 in all-time playoff series

1971

Los Angeles Lakers 1, Milwaukee Bucks 4

1971 Western Conference Finals

1972

Los Angeles Lakers 4, Milwaukee Bucks 2

1972 Western Conference Finals

==== (2) Chicago Bulls vs. (3) Detroit Pistons ====
March 30

Boxscore

Detroit Pistons 97, Chicago Bulls 88
Scoring by quarter: 29–16, 22–22, 20–27, 26–23
Pts: Bob Lanier 27; Rebs: Lanier, Rowe 13 each Asts: Don Adams 6	Pts: Jerry Sloan 24; Rebs: Sloan, Ray 10 each Asts: Norm Van Lier 6
Detroit leads series, 1–0

Chicago Stadium, Chicago, Illinois
Attendance: 10,711

April 1

Boxscore

Chicago Bulls 108, Detroit Pistons 103
Scoring by quarter: 27–27, 23–22, 29–28, 29–26
Pts: Bob Love 38; Rebs: Clifford Ray 11; Asts: Norm Van Lier 9	Pts: Bob Lanier 38; Rebs: Bob Lanier 19; Asts: Dave Bing 7
Series tied, 1–1

Cobo Arena, Detroit, Michigan
Attendance: 11,499

April 5

Boxscore

Detroit Pistons 83, Chicago Bulls 84
Scoring by quarter: 17–13, 23–29, 19–27, 24–15
Pts: Dave Bing 23; Rebs: Bob Lanier 16; Asts: Lanier, Rowe 2 each	Pts: Chet Walker 21; Rebs: Jerry Sloan 14; Asts: Norm Van Lier 5
Chicago leads series, 2–1

Chicago Stadium, Chicago, Illinois
Attendance: 17,634

April 7

Boxscore

Chicago Bulls 87, Detroit Pistons 102
Scoring by quarter: 25–22, 19–25, 21–35, 22–20
Pts: Bob Love 23; Rebs: Clifford Ray 9 Asts: Norm Van Lier 9	Pts: Bob Lanier 26; Rebs: Bob Lanier 18; Asts: Dave Bing 8
Series tied, 2–2

Cobo Arena, Detroit, Michigan
Attendance: 11,287

April 9

Boxscore

Detroit Pistons 94, Chicago Bulls 98
Scoring by quarter: 14–28, 26–29, 23–18, 31–23
Pts: Bob Lanier 23; Rebs: Bob Lanier 17; Asts: Dave Bing 6	Pts: Bob Love 32; Rebs: Jerry Sloan 17; Asts: Norm Van Lier 4
Chicago leads series, 3–2

Chicago Stadium, Chicago, Illinois
Attendance: 14,236

April 11

Boxscore

Chicago Bulls 88, Detroit Pistons 92
Scoring by quarter: 22–15, 19–25, 23–24, 24–28
Pts: Chet Walker 33; Rebs: Clifford Ray 15; Asts: Norm Van Lier 10	Pts: Bob Lanier 28; Rebs: Bob Lanier 14; Asts: Dave Bing 10
Series tied, 3–3

Cobo Arena, Detroit, Michigan
Attendance: 11,134

April 13

Boxscore

Detroit Pistons 94, Chicago Bulls 96
Scoring by quarter: 18–25, 23–27, 30–28, 23–16
Pts: Stu Lantz 25; Rebs: Lanier, Rowe 10 each Asts: Stu Lantz 5	Pts: Chet Walker 26; Rebs: Clifford Ray 15; Asts: Bob Weiss 5
Chicago wins series, 4–3

Chicago Stadium, Chicago, Illinois
Attendance: 13,133

This was the first playoff meeting between these two teams, and is one of only two times in which the Bulls defeated the Pistons in the playoffs.

== Conference finals ==
=== Eastern Conference finals ===
==== (1) Boston Celtics vs. (2) New York Knicks ====
April 14

Boxscore

New York Knicks 88, Boston Celtics 113
Scoring by quarter: 16–21, 23–30, 23–32, 26–30
Pts: Walt Frazier 16; Rebs: Dave DeBusschere 10; Asts: Meminger, Bibby 3 each	Pts: John Havlicek 25; Rebs: Dave Cowens 13; Asts: John Havlicek 12
Boston leads series, 1–0

Boston Garden, Boston, Massachusetts
Attendance: 14,101

April 16

Boxscore

Boston Celtics 111, New York Knicks 99
Scoring by quarter: 33–25, 20–35, 33–14, 25–25
Pts: John Havlicek 27; Rebs: Dave Cowens 18; Asts: Jo Jo White 6	Pts: Bill Bradley 20; Rebs: Dave DeBusschere 9 Asts: Walt Frazier 4
Boston leads series, 2–0

Madison Square Garden, New York City, New York
Attendance: 19,694

April 19

Boxscore

New York Knicks 103, Boston Celtics 100
Scoring by quarter: 22–18, 31–26, 31–23, 19–33
Pts: Walt Frazier 38; Rebs: Frazier, Gianelli 10 each Asts: Walt Frazier 4	Pts: Dave Cowens 28; Rebs: Dave Cowens 22; Asts: Art Williams 5
Boston leads series, 2–1

Boston Garden, Boston, Massachusetts
Attendance: 15,320

April 21

Boxscore

Boston Celtics 98, New York Knicks 91
Scoring by quarter: 28–32, 23–18, 24–23, 23–18
Pts: John Havlicek 36; Rebs: Paul Silas 14; Asts: Jo Jo White 9	Pts: Walt Frazier 25; Rebs: John Gianelli 9 Asts: Earl Monroe 5
Boston leads series, 3–1

Madison Square Garden, New York City, New York
Attendance: 19,694

- Willis Reed’s final NBA game.

April 24

Boxscore

New York Knicks 94, Boston Celtics 105
Scoring by quarter: 20–21, 32–24, 27–35, 15–25
Pts: Phil Jackson 27; Rebs: Phil Jackson 9 Asts: Walt Frazier 6	Pts: John Havlicek 33; Rebs: Dave Cowens 14; Asts: John Havlicek 5
Boston wins series, 4–1

Boston Garden, Boston, Massachusetts
Attendance: 15,320

- Dave DeBusschere and Jerry Lucas’ final NBA game.

This was the 10th playoff meeting between these two teams, with the Knicks winning five of the previous nine meetings.

Previous playoff series
New York leads 5–4 in all-time playoff series

1951

Boston Celtics 0, New York Knicks 2

1951 Eastern Division Semifinals

1952

Boston Celtics 1, New York Knicks 2

1952 Eastern Division Semifinals

1953

Boston Celtics 1, New York Knicks 3

1953 Eastern Division Finals

1954

Boston Celtics 2, New York Knicks 0

1954 Eastern Division Round Robin Semifinals

1955

Boston Celtics 2, New York Knicks 1

1955 Eastern Division Semifinals

1967

Boston Celtics 3, New York Knicks 1

1967 Eastern Division Semifinals

1969

Boston Celtics 4, New York Knicks 2

1969 Eastern Division Finals

1972

Boston Celtics 1, New York Knicks 4

1972 Eastern Conference Finals

1973

Boston Celtics 3, New York Knicks 4

1973 Eastern Conference Finals

=== Western Conference finals ===
==== (1) Milwaukee Bucks vs. (2) Chicago Bulls ====
April 16

Boxscore

Chicago Bulls 85, Milwaukee Bucks 101
Scoring by quarter: 18–21, 24–28, 21–32, 22–20
Pts: Norm Van Lier 26; Rebs: Bob Love 10; Asts: Norm Van Lier 10	Pts: Abdul-Jabbar, Dandridge 25 each Rebs: Kareem Abdul-Jabbar 19; Asts: Oscar Robertson 10
Milwaukee leads series, 1–0

Milwaukee Arena, Milwaukee, Wisconsin
Attendance: 10,938

April 18

Boxscore

Milwaukee Bucks 113, Chicago Bulls 111
Scoring by quarter: 30–29, 32–22, 29–26, 22–34
Pts: Kareem Abdul-Jabbar 44; Rebs: Kareem Abdul-Jabbar 21; Asts: Oscar Robertson 8	Pts: Norm Van Lier 27; Rebs: Clifford Ray 15; Asts: Norm Van Lier 7
Milwaukee leads series, 2–0

Chicago Stadium, Chicago, Illinois
Attendance: 17,787

April 20

Boxscore

Chicago Bulls 90, Milwaukee Bucks 113
Scoring by quarter: 22–26, 19–27, 25–30, 24–30
Pts: Bob Love 30; Rebs: Clifford Ray 15; Asts: Clifford Ray 6	Pts: Kareem Abdul-Jabbar 32; Rebs: Kareem Abdul-Jabbar 14; Asts: Oscar Robertson 12
Milwaukee leads series, 3–0

Milwaukee Arena, Milwaukee, Wisconsin
Attendance: 10,938

April 22

Boxscore

Milwaukee Bucks 115, Chicago Bulls 99
Scoring by quarter: 20–20, 28–32, 29–16, 38–31
Pts: Kareem Abdul-Jabbar 38; Rebs: Kareem Abdul-Jabbar 24; Asts: Oscar Robertson 10	Pts: Bob Love 32; Rebs: Love, Ray 8 each Asts: Norm Van Lier 7
Milwaukee wins series, 4–0

Chicago Stadium, Chicago, Illinois
Attendance: 12,762

This was the first playoff meeting between these two teams.

== NBA Finals: (W1) Milwaukee Bucks vs. (E1) Boston Celtics ==
April 28

Boxscore

Boston Celtics 98, Milwaukee Bucks 83
Scoring by quarter: 35–19, 17–23, 17–19, 29–22
Pts: John Havlicek 26; Rebs: Dave Cowens 17; Asts: Cowens, White 7 each	Pts: Kareem Abdul-Jabbar 35; Rebs: Kareem Abdul-Jabbar 14; Asts: Oscar Robertson 8
Boston leads series, 1–0

Milwaukee Arena, Milwaukee, Wisconsin
Attendance: 10,938
Referees: Richie Powers, Jake O'Donnell

April 30

Boxscore

Boston Celtics 96, Milwaukee Bucks 105 (OT)
Scoring by quarter: 24–23, 17–32, 25–22, 24–13, Overtime: 6–15
Pts: Jo Jo White 25; Rebs: Dave Cowens 11; Asts: Dave Cowens 6	Pts: Kareem Abdul-Jabbar 36; Rebs: Kareem Abdul-Jabbar 15; Asts: Oscar Robertson 9
Series tied, 1–1

Milwaukee Arena, Milwaukee, Wisconsin
Attendance: 10,938
Referees: Mendy Rudolph, Darell Garretson

May 3

Boxscore

Milwaukee Bucks 83, Boston Celtics 95
Scoring by quarter: 13–32, 24–19, 22–26, 24–18
Pts: Kareem Abdul-Jabbar 26; Rebs: Abdul-Jabbar, Warner 10 each Asts: Abdul-Jabbar, Robertson 5 each	Pts: Dave Cowens 30; Rebs: John Havlicek 12; Asts: Jo Jo White 8
Boston leads series, 2–1

Boston Garden, Boston, Massachusetts
Attendance: 15,320
Referees: Richie Powers, Don Murphy

May 5

Boxscore

Milwaukee Bucks 97, Boston Celtics 89
Scoring by quarter: 28–27, 21–12, 21–26, 27–24
Pts: Kareem Abdul-Jabbar 34; Rebs: Kareem Abdul-Jabbar 14; Asts: Oscar Robertson 9	Pts: John Havlicek 33; Rebs: Paul Silas 12; Asts: Jo Jo White 9
Series tied, 2–2

Boston Garden, Boston, Massachusetts
Attendance: 15,320
Referees: Mendy Rudolph, Earl Strom

May 7

Boxscore

Boston Celtics 96, Milwaukee Bucks 87
Scoring by quarter: 20–15, 25–29, 24–17, 27–26
Pts: Havlicek, Cowens 28 each Rebs: Paul Silas 16; Asts: Dave Cowens 6	Pts: Kareem Abdul-Jabbar 37; Rebs: Kareem Abdul-Jabbar 11; Asts: Jon McGlocklin 8
Boston leads series, 3–2

Milwaukee Arena, Milwaukee, Wisconsin
Attendance: 10,938
Referees: Richie Powers, Jake O'Donnell

May 10

Boxscore

Milwaukee Bucks 102, Boston Celtics 101 (2OT)
Scoring by quarter: 27–19, 20–21, 22–23, 17–23, Overtime: 4–4, 12–11
Pts: Kareem Abdul-Jabbar 34; Rebs: four players 8 each Asts: Oscar Robertson 10	Pts: John Havlicek 36; Rebs: Havlicek, Silas 9 each Asts: Jo Jo White 11
Series tied, 3–3

Boston Garden, Boston, Massachusetts
Attendance: 15,320
Referees: Mendy Rudolph, Darell Garretson

- Dave Cowens hits the game-tying shot with 1 minute left in regulation to force the first OT; John Havlicek rebounds his missed-shot and makes the game-tying basket with 5 seconds left in the first OT to force the second OT; Kareem Abdul-Jabbar hits the game-winning sky-hook with 3 seconds left in the second OT.

May 12

Boxscore

Boston Celtics 102, Milwaukee Bucks 87
Scoring by quarter: 22–20, 31–20, 18–26, 31–21
Pts: Dave Cowens 28; Rebs: Dave Cowens 14; Asts: Havlicek, Westphal 6 each	Pts: Kareem Abdul-Jabbar 26; Rebs: Kareem Abdul-Jabbar 13; Asts: Oscar Robertson 11
Boston wins series, 4–3

Milwaukee Arena, Milwaukee, Wisconsin
Attendance: 10,938
Referees: Mendy Rudolph, Richie Powers

- Oscar Robertson’s final NBA game.

This was the first playoff meeting between these two teams.
