= 1985 FIBA European Champions Cup Final =

Cup final

Cibona (Socialist Federal Republic of Yugoslavia)	(Spain) Real Madrid
87	78
- Date: 3 April 1985
- Venue: Peace and Friendship Stadium, Piraeus, Athens, Greece
- Referees: Yvan Mainini, Kostas Rigas
- Attendance: 14,500

The 1985 FIBA European Champions Cup Final was the deciding game of the 1984–85 FIBA European Champions Cup season. The game was played on 3 April 1985, at the Peace and Friendship Stadium in Piraeus, Athens, Greece. Cibona defeated Real Madrid 87–78 to win the championship.

== Match details ==
3 April 1985
19:00

Cibona (Socialist Federal Republic of Yugoslavia)	87–78	(Spain) Real Madrid
Scoring by quarter: 39–38, 48–40
Pts: Petrović 36; Rebs: Nakić 11; Asts: Petrović 4		Pts: Robinson 22; Rebs: Robinson 11; Asts: Robinson, Corbalán 2

Peace and Friendship Stadium, Piraeus
Attendance: 14,500
Referees: Yvan Mainini (FRA), Kostas Rigas (GRE)

1984–85 FIBA European Champions Cup
Champions

Cibona
1st Title

== Awards ==
=== FIBA European Champions Cup Finals Top Scorer ===
- (Socialist Federal Republic of Yugoslavia) Dražen Petrović ( (Socialist Federal Republic of Yugoslavia) Cibona)
