= Peace and Friendship Stadium =

Multi-purpose indoor arena in Piraeus, Greece

- SEF

- Interactive map of Peace and Friendship Stadium
- Location: Neo Faliro, Piraeus, Greece
- Coordinates: 37°56′32.91″N 23°40′02.27″E
- Owner: Olympiacos
- Operator: Olympiacos
- Capacity: Basketball: 11,640(permanent seating); 12,300 (including court-side seats - current for Olympiacos games); 14,776 (all collapsible bleachers in use); 14,940 (all collapsible bleachers in use, plus court-side seats); Volleyball: 13,200 (during the 2004 Athens Summer Olympics); Indoor athletics: 10,520
- Surface: Parquet
- Public transit: Athens Metro Athens Tram Athens Metro Line 1 Athens Tram Line 7

Construction
- Groundbreaking: 1983
- Opened: February 16, 1985
- Renovated: 2002–2004
- Cost: € 25 million (1983); Renovation: € 7.3 million (2002–2004)
- Architect: Thimios Papagiannis

Tenants
- Olympiacos; Hellenic Amateur Athletic Association; Hellenic Olympic Committee

The Peace and Friendship Stadium (Greek: Στάδιο Ειρήνης και Φιλίας, romanized: Stadio Eirinis kai Philias), commonly known by its acronym SEF (Greek: ΣΕΦ), is a multi-purpose indoor arena that is located in Piraeus, on the coastal zone of Attica, Greece. The arena is mostly known for being the home to EuroLeague team Olympiacos, and is the central venue of the Faliro Coastal Zone Olympic Complex. It opened in 1985 and its design was inspired by Palasport di San Siro.

The arena complex also contains a 942-seat amphitheater, a weight training room, a full practice facility, three auxiliary courts that house the Olympiacos youth clubs, and the Olympiacos team office. It is also used as training center for the Hellenic Amateur Athletic Association.

As of late spring 2026, the Peace and Friendship Stadium is undergoing a renovation that will improve and expand seating and at the same time making the arena more efficient at the energy consumption level.

== History ==
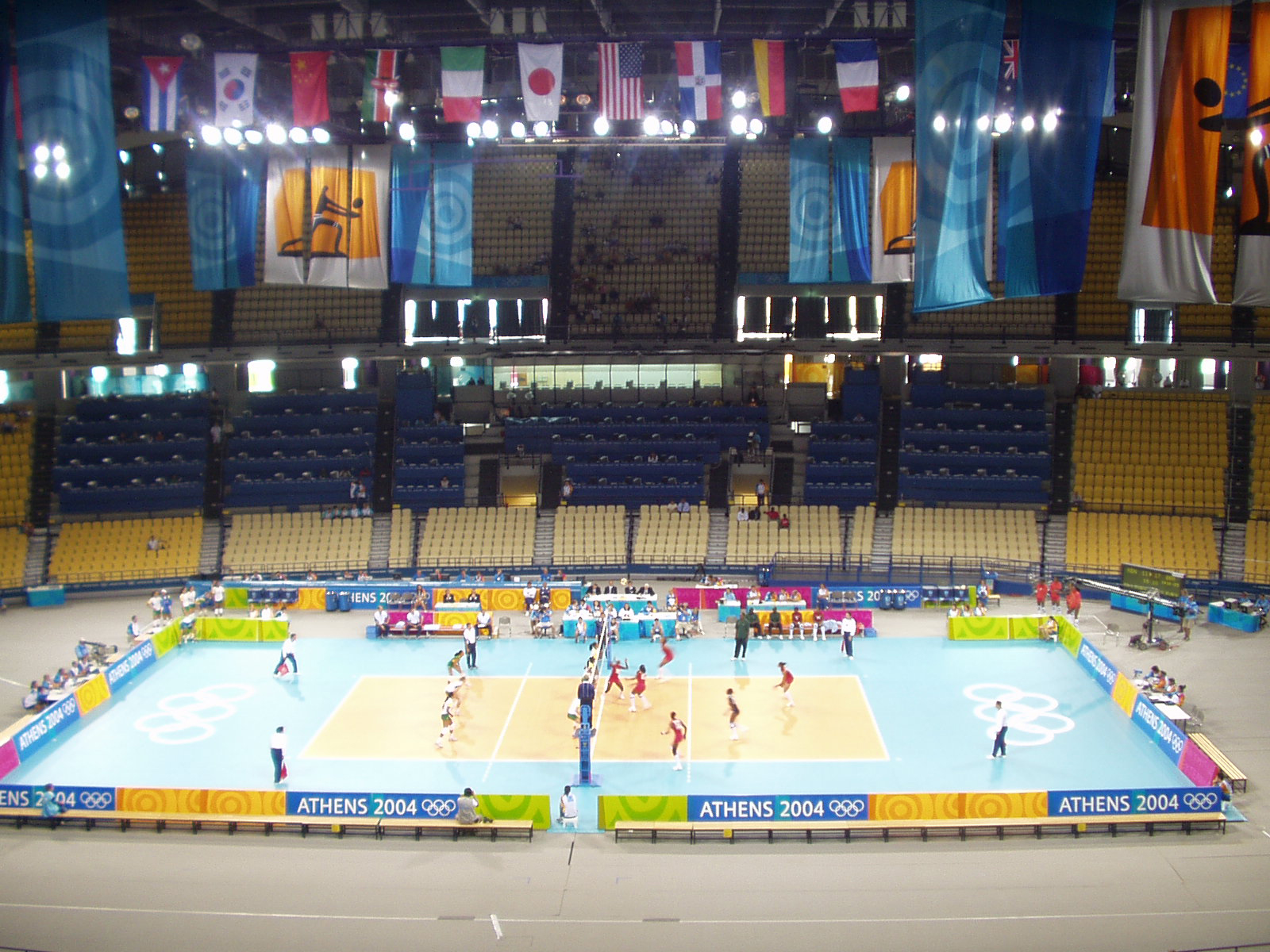
13,200 seat configuration during the 2004 Athens Summer Olympics Volleyball Tournament.

The Peace and Friendship Stadium opened in 1985, and its construction cost was €25,000,000 in 1983 prices. It was designed by the architectural firm "Thymios Papagiannis and Associates" and had a capacity of 14,940. The arena is built opposite to the Karaiskakis Stadium, located in the western end of the Phaleron Bay. It was inaugurated on February 16, 1985, at the first Panhellenic Athletics Indoor Championship, and hosted the 1985 European Athletics Indoor Championships in March. Originally it was designed and operated for a dual use as an ice hockey rink and as basketball stadium. The first Greek Ice Hockey Championship was held in the stadium in 1989. The operation of the skating rink was stopped for the use of other sports.

In 1991, the arena won the Golden Award from IAKS, the International Association for Sports and Leisure Facilities.

Since the 1991–92 season, the Peace and Friendship Stadium has been the home court to Greek League and EuroLeague professional basketball club Olympiacos. The arena was closed from April 2002, to early 2004, for renovation works, at a total cost of €7,300,000, and hosted the indoor volleyball tournament during the 2004 Summer Olympics. During the period that the arena was closed for renovations, Olympiacos played at the Glyfada Makis Liougas Sportshall, during the 2001–02 season, and at the Korydallos Sports Hall, during the 2002–03 and 2003–04 seasons. The Greek Basket League club Lavrio used the arena to host its FIBA Champions League home games, during the 2021–22 season.

The arena's total capacity varies, depending on the collapsible bleachers used in the lower level, besides its 11,640 permanent seating in the mid and upper levels, with additional temporary seating, it currently seats a total of 12,300 people for basketball games. The Peace and Friendship Stadium seats up to 14,776 for basketball games, with all the bleachers in use.

== Training facility and auxiliary courts ==
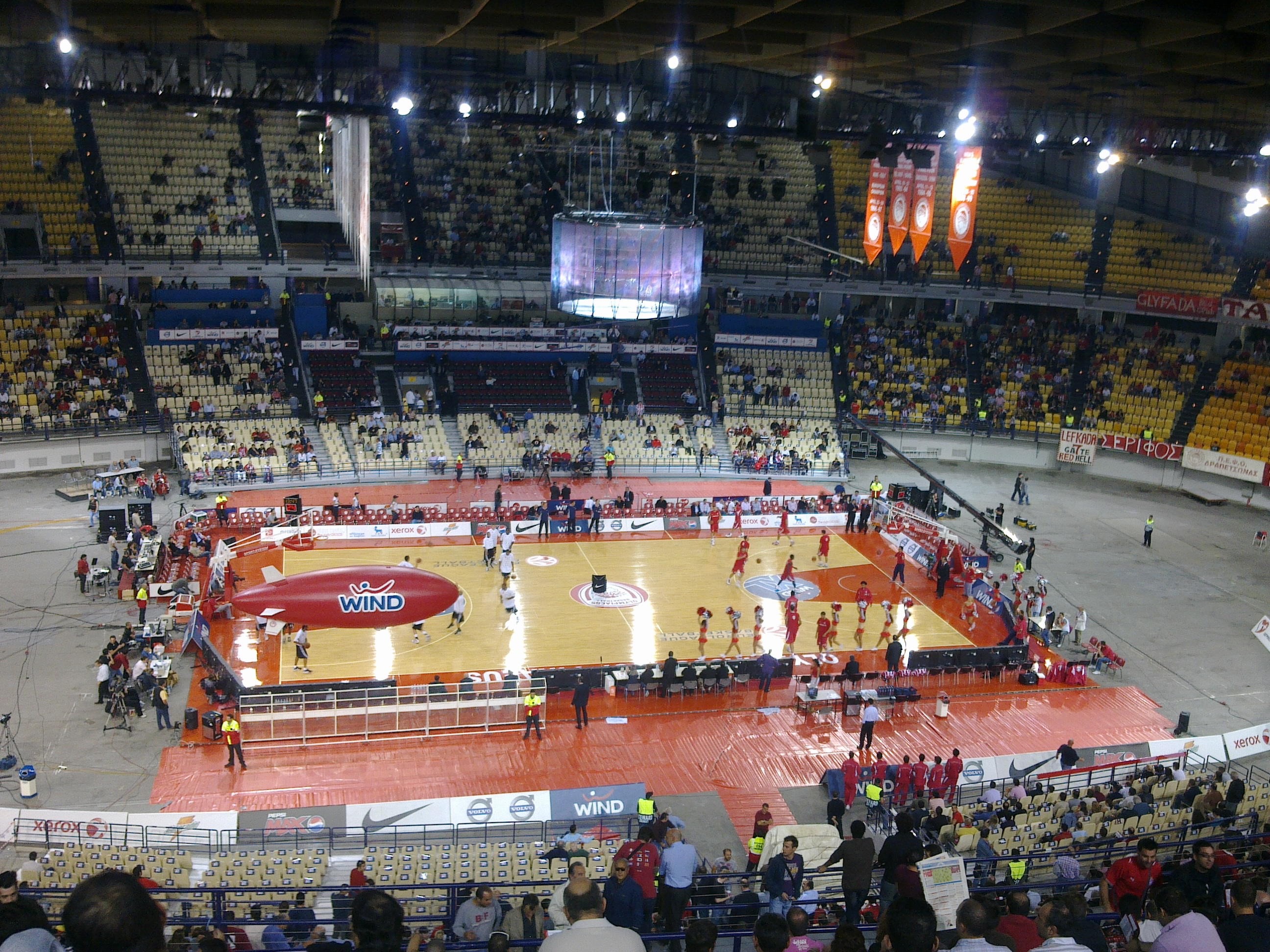
Olympiacos and Orléans warm up before a EuroLeague game at the Peace and Friendship Stadium, in October 2009.

The arena features a full training court for the senior men's team of Olympiacos, which is also used by the club's reserve team, Olympiacos B Development Team. The arena also has additional auxiliary basketball courts. The auxiliary courts are used by the youth clubs of Olympiacos.

== Other uses ==
The arena is occasionally used for events like congresses, music concerts, and indoor motocross races. The Scorpions, Phil Collins, Dire Straits, Status Quo, UB40, Gloria Estefan, Deep Purple, A-HA and Placebo, are among the artists who have performed at the Peace and Friendship Stadium.

Outside the main arena, in the same stadium building, there is a 942-seat amphitheater, and various other halls of a total area of 16,048 sqm, where exhibitions and congresses take place.

== Transportation ==
Panoramic view of Peace and Friendship Stadium

The Peace and Friendship Stadium is located in the Neo Faliro area of Piraeus municipality, on the coastal Poseidonos Avenue, and at the end of the Kifissou Avenue. It is 2 km away from the port of Piraeus. It sits on a major transportation hub, served by a dozen bus lines, next to the Faliro metro station on Athens Metro Line 1, and the SEF tram stop.

== Notable events hosted ==
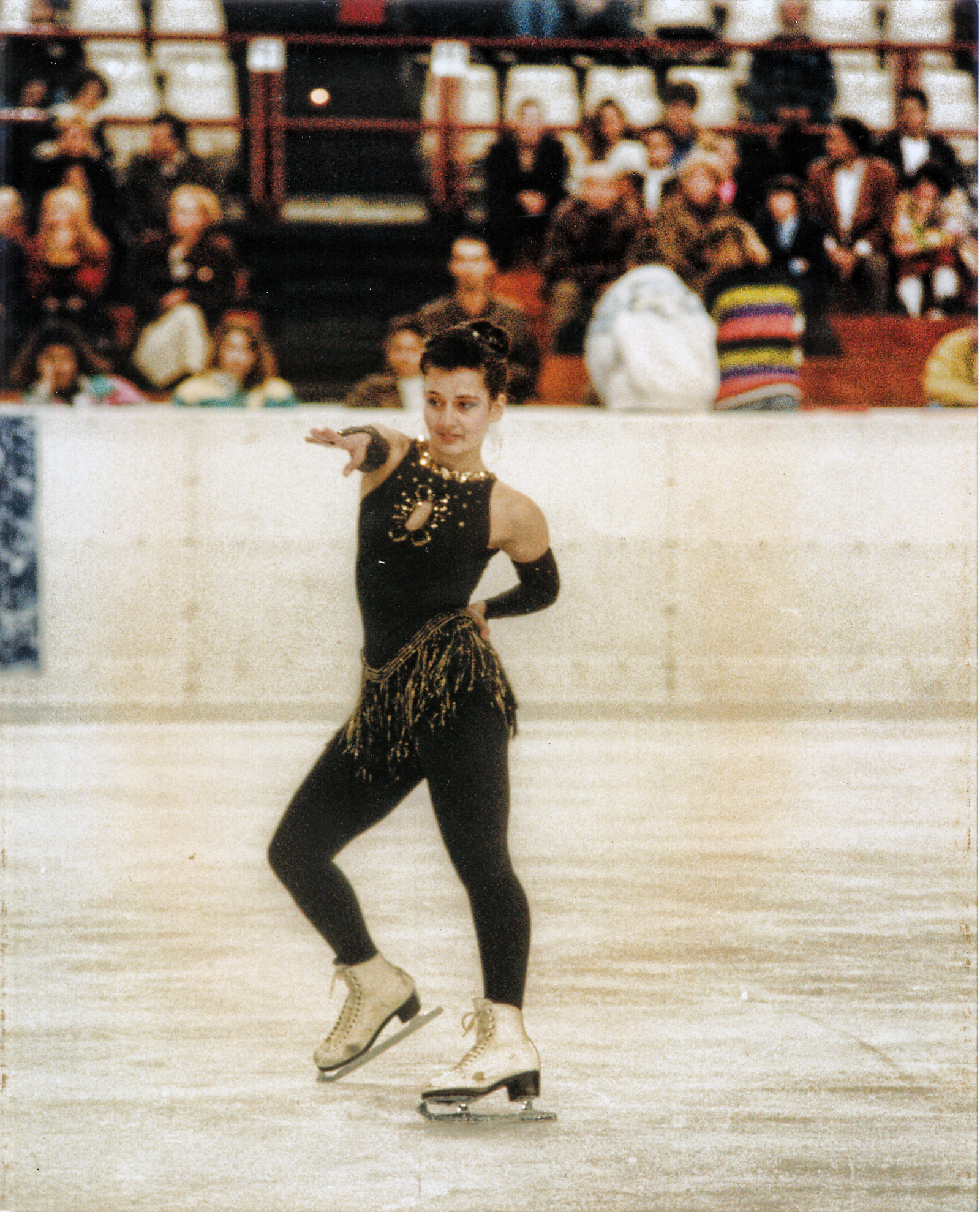
During the Greek Figure Skating Championship (before 1991)

- Indoor athletics
  - 1985 European Athletics Indoor Championships
  - Balkan Athletics Indoor Championships (1991–2002, 2007, 2009)
- Volleyball
  - 1989 European Champions' Cup Final
  - 1992 European Champions' Cup Final Four
  - 1993 European Champions' Cup Final Four
  - 1994 World Championship
  - 1995 Men's European Volleyball Championship
  - 1996 European Cup Winners' Cup Final Four
  - 2000 2nd World Qualification Tournament Men Pre Olympic Tournament
  - 2004 Summer Olympics – Volleyball tournament
  - 2005 European Top Teams Cup Final Four
  - 2018 CEV Challenge Cup Second Leg Final
  - 2023 CEV Challenge Cup Second Leg Final
- Basketball
  - 1985 FIBA European Champions' Cup Final
  - 1987 EuroBasket
  - 1989 FIBA European Cup Winners' Cup Final
  - 1991 FIBA Centennial Jubilee
  - 1993 FIBA European League Final Four
  - 1998 FIBA World Championship
  - 2024 FIBA Men's Olympic Qualifying Tournaments (Tournament 3)
  - EuroBasket Women 2025
- Handball
  - 2024 EHF European Cup Second Leg Final
- Wrestling
  - 1986 European Championships
  - 1988 World Cup (Greco-Roman Men's)
  - 1999 World Championship (Greco-Roman Men's)
- Gymnastics
  - 1990 European Women's Artistic Gymnastics Championships
  - 1991 World Rhythmic Gymnastics Championships
- Weightlifting
  - 1999 World Championships
- Robotics competitions
  - 2024 FIRST Global Challenge

== See also ==
- List of basketball arenas by capacity
- List of indoor arenas in Greece

Events and tenants
Preceded by Scandinavium; Gothenburg	European Indoor Championships in Athletics; Venue; 1985	Succeeded by Palacio de Deportes de la CAM; Madrid
Preceded by Patinoire des Vernets; Geneva	FIBA European Champions Cup; Final Venue; 1985	Succeeded by Budapest Sportcsarnok; Budapest
Preceded by Schleyerhalle; Stuttgart	FIBA EuroBasket; Final Venue; 1987	Succeeded by Dom Sportova; Zagreb
Preceded by Palais des Sports; Grenoble	FIBA European Cup Winners' Cup; Final Venue; 1989	Succeeded by Palasport di Firenze; Florence
Preceded by Abdi İpekçi Arena; Istanbul	FIBA European League; Final Four; Venue; 1993	Succeeded by Yad Eliyahu Sports Hall; Tel Aviv
Preceded by Arena Stožice; Ljubljana	FIBA Women's EuroBasket; Final venue 2025	Succeeded by Twinsbet Arena; Vilnius
