= Vlade Divac =

Serbian basketball player and executive (born 1968)

- Владе Дивац
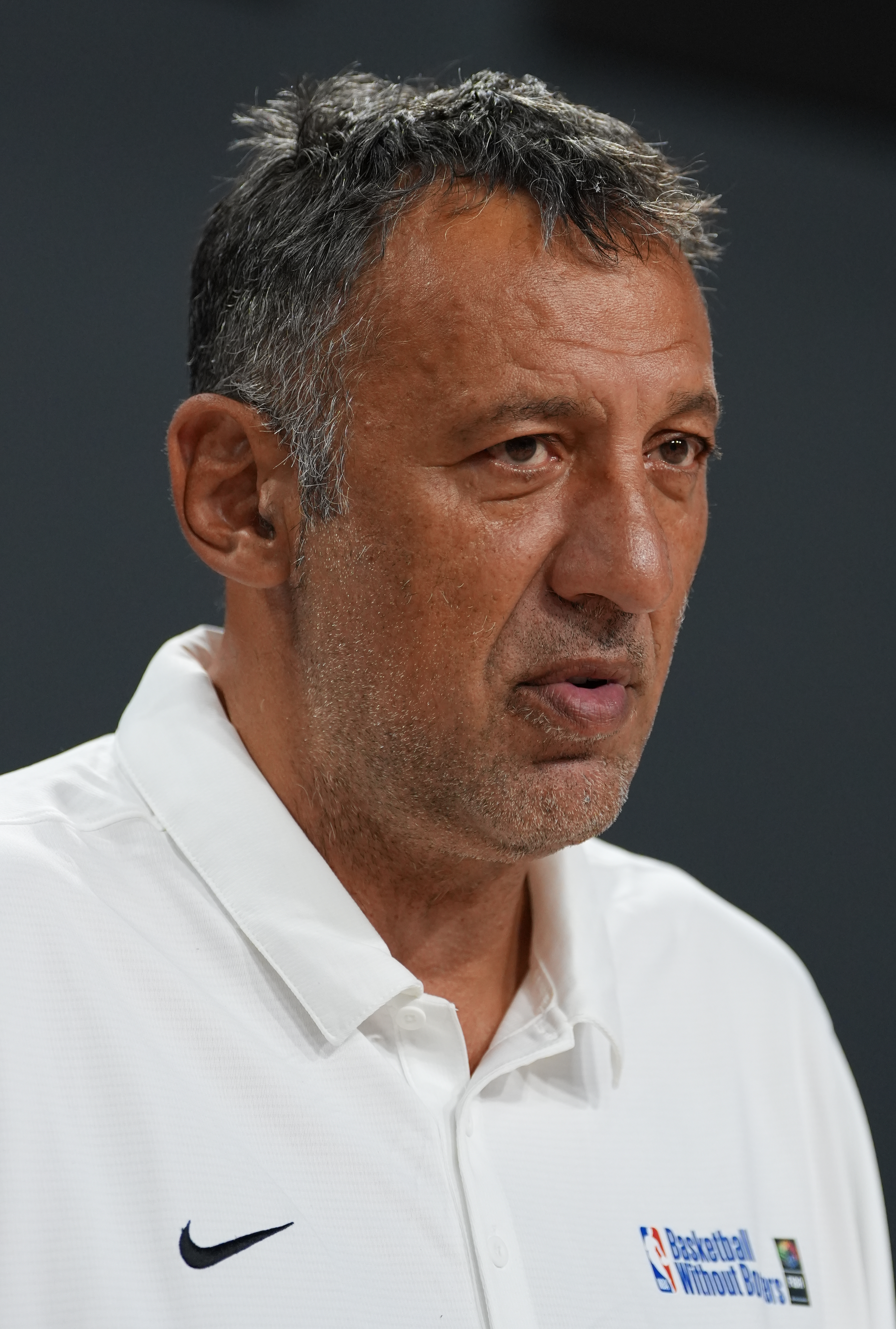
- Divac in 2026

President of the Serbian Olympic Committee
- In office 2009–2017
- Preceded by: Ivan Ćurković
- Succeeded by: Božidar Maljković

President of KK Partizan
- In office 2000–2004
- Preceded by: Ivica Dačić
- Succeeded by: Jovica Pavlović

Personal details
- Born: February 3, 1968 (age 58) Prijepolje, SR Serbia, SFR Yugoslavia
- Occupation: Basketball player; sports administrator; basketball executive; businessman
- Basketball career

Personal information
- Listed height: 7 ft 1 in (2.16 m)
- Listed weight: 260 lb (118 kg)

Career information
- NBA draft: 1989: 1st round, 26th overall pick
- Drafted by: Los Angeles Lakers
- Playing career: 1983–2005
- Position: Center
- Number: 12, 21

Career history
- 1983–1986: Sloga
- 1986–1989: Partizan
- 1989–1996: Los Angeles Lakers
- 1996–1998: Charlotte Hornets
- 1999: Crvena zvezda
- 1999–2004: Sacramento Kings
- 2004–2005: Los Angeles Lakers

Career highlights
- NBA All-Star (2001); NBA All-Rookie First Team (1990); No. 21 retired by Sacramento Kings; FIBA Korać Cup champion (1989); Yugoslav League champion (1987); Yugoslav Cup winner (1989); Mister Europa Player of the Year (1989); FIBA's 50 Greatest Players (1991); FIBA All-Time EuroStars Team (2007); 50 Greatest EuroLeague Contributors (2008); Olympic Order (2016)

Career NBA statistics
- Points: 13,398 (11.8 ppg)
- Rebounds: 9,326 (8.2 rpg)
- Blocks: 1,631 (1.4 bpg)
- Stats at NBA.com
- Stats at Basketball Reference
- Basketball Hall of Fame
- FIBA Hall of Fame
Medals
Men's basketball
Representing Yugoslavia
Summer Olympic Games
Silver medal – second place	1988 Seoul	Team
FIBA World Cup
Gold medal – first place	1990 Argentina	Team
Bronze medal – third place	1986 Spain	Team
FIBA Eurobasket
Gold medal – first place	1989 Yugoslavia	Team
Gold medal – first place	1991 Italy	Team
Bronze medal – third place	1987 Greece	Team
Universiade
Gold medal – first place	1987 Zagreb	Team
FIBA U19 Basketball World Cup
Gold medal – first place	1987 Italy	Under-19
European Championship for Cadets
Gold medal – first place	1985 Bulgaria	Under-16
Representing (Federal Republic of Yugoslavia) FR Yugoslavia
Summer Olympic Games
Silver medal – second place	1996 Atlanta	Team
FIBA World Cup
Gold medal – first place	2002 Indianapolis	Team
FIBA Eurobasket
Gold medal – first place	1995 Greece	Team
Bronze medal – third place	1999 France	Team

Vlade Divac (Serbian Cyrillic: Владе Дивац, pronounced [ʋlǎːde dǐːʋats]; born February 3, 1968) is a Serbian professional basketball executive and a former player who was most recently the vice president of basketball operations and general manager of the Sacramento Kings of the National Basketball Association (NBA).

At 7 ft 1 in (2.16 m), Divac played center and, unlike many centers, was known for his passing skills. He was among the first group of European basketball players to transfer to the NBA in the late 1980s and was named one of the 50 Greatest EuroLeague Contributors. He is one of seven players in NBA history to record 13,000 points, 9,000 rebounds, 3,000 assists, and 1,500 blocked shots, along with Kareem Abdul-Jabbar, Hakeem Olajuwon, Shaquille O'Neal, Tim Duncan, Kevin Garnett, and Pau Gasol. (Note: The NBA did not record blocked shots before the 1973–74 season, so earlier players such as Bill Russell and Wilt Chamberlain probably had similar career achievements.) Divac was also the first player born and trained outside the United States to play in over 1,000 games in the NBA. Divac was named to the FIBA All-Time EuroStars Team in 2007. On August 20, 2010, he was inducted into the FIBA Hall of Fame in recognition of his play in international competition. He was elected to the Naismith Memorial Basketball Hall of Fame in 2019.

Divac is a humanitarian, helping children in his native country of Serbia and in Africa. In October 2008, he was appointed as government adviser in Serbia for humanitarian issues. In February 2009, he was elected President of the Serbian Olympic Committee for a four-year term and re-elected in November 2012. In 2013, Divac received an honor from the World Sports Humanitarian Hall of Fame.

== Professional career ==
=== Sloga (1983–1986) ===
Divac began playing basketball in his home town Prijepolje for the team KK Elan. He began his professional career in Yugoslavia playing for Sloga from Kraljevo, and was immediately noted for scoring 27 points against Crvena zvezda.

=== Partizan (1986–1989) ===
In the summer of 1986, Divac was the top star of the basketball transfer season, and he ended up signing with KK Partizan for DM14,000.

In the 1986-87 Yugoslav First League season, with players like Divac, Aleksandar Đorđević, Žarko Paspalj, Željko Obradović, and with coach Duško Vujošević at the helm, Partizan had a "dream team", which won the Yugoslavian League title. In the subsequent 1987-88 FIBA European Champions Cup season (now called EuroLeague), the club failed to reach the top of the EuroLeague, after having lost to Maccabi Tel Aviv in the semifinal in Ghent. Jugoplastika, with Dino Rađa and Toni Kukoč, was a stronger team in the subsequent three years, reigning both in Yugoslavia and in Europe.

Divac had an unusual style compared to most other centers of his generation: despite his height, he possessed good mobility, had good control of the ball, and was a decent shooter. On occasion, he would also act as a play maker. His trademark moves included a mid-range shot at the top of the key and flip shots around the rim, while facing the complete opposite direction. His quirky moves complemented how he liked playing gags on the court: in the 1989 EuroBasket, he lifted teammate Zoran Radović for a slam dunk. In just four professional seasons in Europe, he became the most sought-after big man on the continent, after Arvydas Sabonis.

=== Los Angeles Lakers (1989–1996) ===
Drafted into the NBA in 1989 by the Los Angeles Lakers, Divac became one of the first European players to have an impact in the league. Under the mentorship of Kareem Abdul-Jabbar and Magic Johnson, he improved his play and adapted to the American style of basketball. Though he spoke no English, he quickly became popular among his teammates and the public for his charm and joviality. In the 1989–90 season, he was selected into the NBA All-Rookie Team.

Divac earned a reputation for flopping, or deceiving the officials into calling a foul on the other team by purposely falling to the floor upon contact with an opposing player. Veteran NBA forward P.J. Brown claimed that Divac might have been the best of all time at flopping. Divac freely admitted doing so, adding that he usually did it when he felt like the officials had missed some calls and owed him. However, when the NBA instituted anti-flopping penalties in 2012, Divac expressed his support for such rules, stating that he felt players after him were "overdo[ing] it" with respect to flopping. Ian Thomsen, a Sports Illustrated columnist, grouped Divac with fellow international players Anderson Varejão and Manu Ginóbili as the players who "made [flopping] famous", exaggerating contact on the court in a manner analogous to diving in FIBA games.

=== Charlotte Hornets (1996–1998) ===
On July 1, 1996, Divac was traded to the Charlotte Hornets for the draft rights to future Hall of Famer Kobe Bryant. Decades later, the trade would be seen as lopsided in favor of the Lakers.

After initially considering retirement upon being traded to the Hornets, Divac developed a close relationship with head coach Dave Cowens and flourished in Charlotte's system. On February 12, 1997, Divac scored 18 points, grabbed 9 rebounds, and recorded a career high 12 blocks in a 113–100 win over the New Jersey Nets. Alongside Glen Rice, Anthony Mason, and Muggsy Bogues, Divac helped the Hornets to a franchise record 54 regular season wins that season. That postseason, Divac averaged 18 points, 8.7 rebounds, and 2 blocks per game in a first round loss to the New York Knicks.

The next year, during the 1998 NBA playoffs, the Hornets beat their division rival Atlanta Hawks in the first round, before losing to the defending champion Chicago Bulls in the conference semifinals.

=== Crvena zvezda (1999) ===
During the 1998–99 NBA lockout, in January 1999, Divac played 2 games for Partizan's eternal rival KK Crvena zvezda, in the 1998–99 EuroLeague season.

His debut for the crveno-beli took place mid-season, on Orthodox Christmas, versus a heavily favoured Žalgiris side led by Tyus Edney, Mindaugas Žukauskas, Saulius Štombergas, and Jiří Zídek Jr. Supported by a raucous home crowd and energized by Divac's arrival, as well as his 16 points and 8 rebounds, Crvena zvezda pulled off a 77–69 memorable upset win.

Divac's brief stint with Crvena zvezda, for which he reportedly got paid US$250,000 per game, immediately became a sore point with KK Partizan fans, who unfurled a banner calling him a traitor, at their club's next game.

The issue of playing for the hated cross-town rival reignited several years later, when Divac returned to KK Partizan as club president. At the time, he stated his decision to play for Crvena zvezda was "a mistake".

=== Sacramento Kings (1999–2004) ===
On January 22, 1999, Divac signed a six-year, $62.5 million contract as a free agent with the Sacramento Kings, where he played for six seasons alongside fellow countryman Peja Stojaković. Teamed with Stojaković, Hedo Türkoğlu, Chris Webber and Mike Bibby, Divac revitalized the Sacramento Kings franchise. The Kings rose in the NBA ranks, becoming a perennial playoff contender and eventually a championship contender, leading the league in wins in 2001-02. The Kings, however, could not get past the Los Angeles Lakers, who beat them controversially in a 7-game series in 2002.

=== Return to the Lakers (2004–2005) ===
After the 2003–04 NBA season, Divac became a free agent. On July 20, 2004, he signed a two-year contract to return to the Lakers, part of Mitch Kupchak's plan to overhaul Laker basketball. The Lakers, following a defeat in the NBA Finals, had traded away or released most of their players, including Shaquille O'Neal, Gary Payton, Karl Malone, Derek Fisher, and more; Divac was supposed to help fill that void.

However, Divac suffered back problems and could not play most of the season, and even when he returned, could only play about nine minutes per game, averaging 2.3 points per game and 2.1 rebounds per game in 15 games, he played eight games early in the season and seven more in the final month of the season.

=== Retirement ===
On July 14, 2005, 37-year-old Divac announced his retirement, ending his 16-year NBA and 22-year professional basketball career. Divac accepted a position with the Lakers as a European liaison to help with scouting overseas.

The Kings retired Divac's No. 21 jersey in a ceremony on March 31, 2009. Over his 16 years in the NBA, Divac earned over $93 million in salary. In September 2009, he played for the "NBA Generations" team in the 2009 NBA Asia Challenge, a series of exhibitions against Korean Basketball League and Philippine Basketball Association players.

== National team career ==
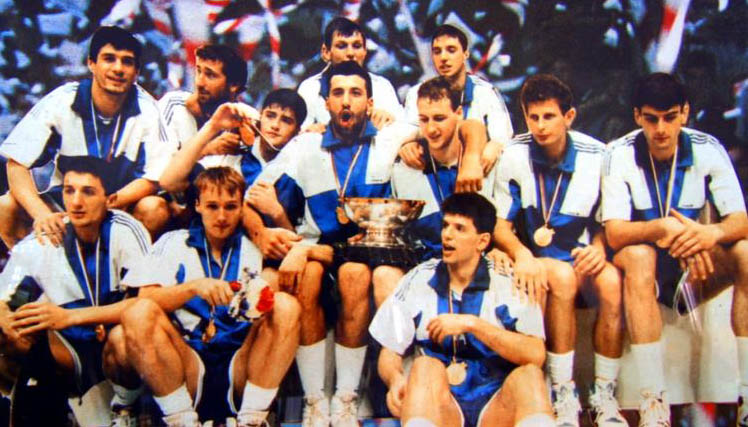
Divac (fourth from right, at centre) with the Yugoslavia team that won the EuroBasket 1989.

In summer 1986, at 18, right after signing for KK Partizan, Divac debuted for the senior Yugoslavia national basketball team at the 1986 FIBA World Championship in Madrid, on invitation by the head coach Krešimir Ćosić. However, the excellent rookie's performance was spoiled by the event in the semi-finals against the Soviet Union. Forty-five seconds before the end, Yugoslavia had a comfortable lead of nine points, but the Soviets scored two three-pointers within a few seconds and cut the difference to three points. Yugoslavia tried to hold the ball for the remaining time, opting to continue the play with throw-ins instead of free throws following fouls, but with only 14 seconds left, Divac committed a double dribble, the Soviets were awarded the ball, and tied the score with another three-pointer. In the overtime, the Soviets won by one point and the Yugoslavs had to be content with the bronze.

The next year, Divac participated in the team that took the gold at the 1987 FIBA Junior World Championship (which was later split into separate under-19 and under-21 events) in Bormio, Italy. That event launched the young generation of Yugoslavian basketball players, also featuring stars like Rađa and Kukoč, regarded as likely the best in history. Before the breakup of Yugoslavia, they would also take the titles at EuroBasket 1989 and the 1990 FIBA World Championship in Argentina, where they were led by Dražen Petrović, as well as the EuroBasket 1991 title, with Aleksandar Đorđević at point guard.

When Yugoslavia won the gold in the 1990 FIBA World Championship, fans rushed onto the court. One of them was holding a Croatian flag, one of the six republics that made up Yugoslavia. Divac claims that he told the man that he should not be waving that flag, since this was a win for Yugoslavia. Divac claims the man made a derogatory remark about the Yugoslav flag, at which point Divac took his flag from him. This happened during a very tense time where nationalistic pride was threatening to tear Yugoslavia apart and ignite a war. The taking of the flag made Divac a hero to Serbs, and a villain to Croatians. Divac has stated that he did not mean it as an act against Croatia and he would have taken away a Serbian flag if a Serb fan had done the same.

This action, along with the Yugoslav Wars, alienated Divac from many of his former Croatian friends, particularly Dražen Petrović, whom he considered his best friend. When FR Yugoslavia won the gold medal at the EuroBasket 1995, and Croatia won bronze, Croatia, still at war with Serbs from Croatia, walked off the podium during the medal ceremony. The teams had not faced each other in the tournament.

In 2002, Divac was part of the team that won the FIBA World Cup in Indianapolis, beating Argentina in the final and the USA earlier on.

== NBA career statistics ==
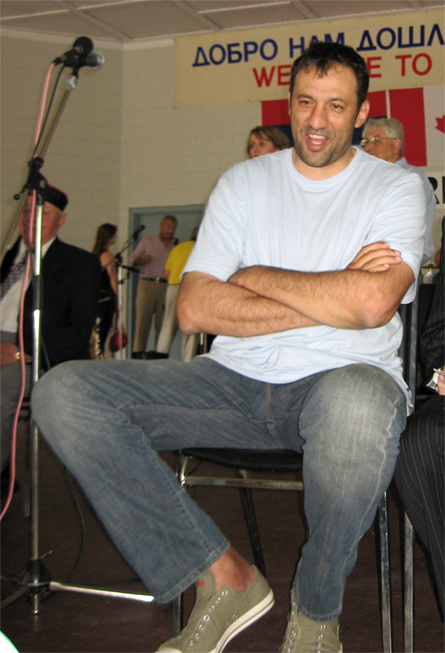
Divac is one of seven players in NBA history to record 13,000 points, 9,000 rebounds, 3,000 assists, and 1,500 blocked shots.

Legend
GP	Games played	GS	Games started	MPG	Minutes per game
FG%	Field goal percentage	3P%	3-point field goal percentage	FT%	Free throw percentage
RPG	Rebounds per game	APG	Assists per game	SPG	Steals per game
BPG	Blocks per game	PPG	Points per game	**Bold**	Career high
*	Led the league

=== Regular season ===
Year	Team	GP	GS	MPG	FG%	3P%	FT%	RPG	APG	SPG	BPG	PPG
1989–90	LA Lakers	**82**	5	19.6	.499	.000	.708	6.2	.9	1.0	1.4	8.5
1990–91	LA Lakers	**82**	**81**	28.2	**.565**	**.357**	.703	8.1	1.1	1.3	1.5	11.2
1991–92	LA Lakers	36	18	27.2	.495	.263	.768	6.9	1.7	1.5	1.0	11.3
1992–93	LA Lakers	**82**	69	30.8	.485	.280	.689	8.9	2.8	**1.6**	1.7	12.8
1993–94	LA Lakers	79	73	34.0	.506	.191	.686	**10.8**	3.9	1.2	1.4	14.2
1994–95	LA Lakers	80	80	35.1	.507	.185	**.777**	10.4	4.1	1.4	**2.2**	**16.0**
1995–96	LA Lakers	79	79	31.3	.513	.167	.641	8.6	3.3	1.0	1.7	12.9
1996–97	Charlotte	81	80	35.1	.494	.234	.683	9.0	3.7	1.3	**2.2**	12.6
1997–98	Charlotte	64	41	28.2	.498	.214	.691	8.1	2.7	1.3	1.5	10.4
1998–99	Sacramento	50*	50*	**35.2**	.470	.256	.702	10.0	4.3	.9	1.0	14.3
1999–00	Sacramento	**82**	**81**	29.0	.503	.269	.691	8.0	3.0	1.3	1.3	12.3
2000–01	Sacramento	81	**81**	29.9	.482	.286	.691	8.3	2.9	1.1	1.1	12.0
2001–02	Sacramento	80	80	30.3	.472	.231	.615	8.4	3.7	1.0	1.2	11.1
2002–03	Sacramento	80	80	29.8	.466	.240	.713	7.2	3.4	1.0	1.3	9.9
2003–04	Sacramento	81	**81**	28.6	.470	.154	.654	5.7	**5.3**	.7	1.0	9.9
2004–05	LA Lakers	15	0	8.7	.419	.000	.667	2.1	1.3	.3	.1	2.3
Career		1134	979	29.8	.495	.235	.692	8.2	3.1	1.1	1.4	11.8
All-Star		1	0	9.0	.667	.000	–	6.0	1.0	2.0	.0	8.0

=== Playoffs ===
Year	Team	GP	GS	MPG	FG%	3P%	FT%	RPG	APG	SPG	BPG	PPG
1990	LA Lakers	9	1	19.4	**.727**	**.500**	.895	5.3	1.1	0.9	1.7	9.1
1991	LA Lakers	**19**	**19**	32.1	.564	.167	.803	6.7	1.1	1.4	2.2	13.3
1992	LA Lakers	4	4	35.8	.349	.000	**.900**	5.5	3.8	1.3	0.8	9.8
1993	LA Lakers	5	5	33.4	.500	.444	.545	9.4	**5.6**	1.2	**2.4**	**18.0**
1995	LA Lakers	10	10	38.8	.467	.222	.645	8.5	3.1	0.8	1.3	15.6
1996	LA Lakers	4	4	28.8	.429	.200	.625	7.5	2.0	0.0	1.3	9.0
1997	Charlotte	3	3	38.7	.457	.000	.800	8.7	3.3	1.0	2.0	**18.0**
1998	Charlotte	9	9	38.5	.483	.000	.606	**10.9**	3.4	0.8	1.6	11.6
1999	Sacramento	5	5	**39.6**	.446	.200	.833	10.0	4.6	**1.6**	0.8	16.2
2000	Sacramento	5	5	32.0	.357	.000	.696	7.2	2.8	1.4	0.8	11.2
2001	Sacramento	8	8	28.1	.350	.333	.763	8.4	2.4	1.0	1.5	10.8
2002	Sacramento	16	16	33.4	.464	.268	.755	9.3	1.7	1.1	1.3	13.5
2003	Sacramento	12	12	26.4	.560	.000	.673	5.8	2.3	0.7	0.9	11.4
2004	Sacramento	12	12	19.6	.437	.000	.739	4.9	1.8	0.3	0.4	6.6
Career		121	113	30.8	.480	.241	.731	7.5	2.4	1.0	1.4	12.1

== Major career achievements ==
=== KK Partizan ===
- Yugoslav League Champion: (1987)
- 1988 EuroLeague Final Four: 3rd Place
- Yugoslav Cup Winner: (1989)
- Korać Cup Winner: (1989)

=== Yugoslavia national team ===
- Earned gold medal with Yugoslavia's under-18 nationals at the 1985 FIBA Europe Under-16 Championship in Rousse, Bulgaria
- Earned gold medal with Yugoslavia's under-21 nationals at the 1986 FIBA Europe Under-18 Championship in Gmunden, Austria
- Earned gold medal with Yugoslavia's under-21 nationals at the 1987 FIBA Under-19 World Cup in Bormio, Italy, defeating the U.S. team twice in that tournament
- Earned silver medals in 1988 Summer Olympic Games (for SFR Yugoslavia) and 1996 Summer Olympic Games (for FR Yugoslavia)
- Earned gold medals with SFRY at the 1990 FIBA World Championship (Argentina) and with FRY at the 2002 FIBA World Championship (U.S.)
- Earned gold medals at EuroBasket in Zagreb 1989, and Rome 1991 (with SFRY), and in Athens 1995 (with FRY)

=== NBA ===
- Named to the 1989–90 NBA All-Rookie First Team after averaging 8.5 ppg and 6.2 rpg for the Lakers
- Appeared in the 1991 NBA Finals against the Chicago Bulls and averaged 12.1 ppg, 7.5 rpg and 2.4 apg in 121 career NBA Playoff games
- Ranks 4th in Lakers franchise history with 830 blocked shots
- Ranked 2nd on the Kings in scoring (14.3 ppg), rebounds (10.0 rpg, 10th in the NBA), assists (4.3 apg) and blocked shots (1.02 bpg) in 1998–99
- Named NBA All-Star, 2001
- One of only five basketball players born and trained in Europe to play at least 1,000 NBA games (1,134; along with Dirk Nowitzki, Tony Parker, Pau Gasol, Boris Diaw)
- One of only five basketball players born and trained in Europe (Peja Stojaković, Dražen Petrović, Pau Gasol and Zydrunas Ilgauskas are the others) to have his number retired by an NBA team
- J. Walter Kennedy Citizenship Award: (2000)

== Administrative career ==
Through the twilight of his playing career and afterwards, Divac focused on three fields: humanitarian work, sport management, and investment.

=== KK Partizan president ===
In late 2000, following the overthrow of Slobodan Milošević whose policies Divac had been openly critical of throughout the mid-to-late 1990s, Divac and former teammate Predrag Danilović took over their former club KK Partizan. They did so on the initiative of Ivica Dačić, the club's outgoing president and, more importantly, a suddenly marginalized politician who, due to his association with Milošević, was forced to leave his post at the club. Seeing that various state-owned companies and community property were being taken over in a dubious manner during the power vacuum that resulted from the régime change, Dačić saw it prudent to bring the club's two former greats as a safeguard against the same happening to KK Partizan. Divac became the club's president while Danilović took the vice-president role.

Freshly retired from playing, Danilović was actually running the club's day-to-day operations since Divac was still very actively involved with the Sacramento Kings at the time. The head coach they inherited, Darko Ruso, finished out the 2000–01 season before they decided in the summer of 2001 to bring back their mentor Duško Vujošević to be the new head coach. In late 2004 the duo pulled out of the venture as it became too much of a financial burden. While he stopped performing any official functions at the club, Divac continued to be involved with it in a lesser capacity for a few years afterwards.

=== LA Lakers scout ===
In October 2005, right after ending his playing career with the Los Angeles Lakers, Divac was hired as the Lakers' European scout, reporting directly to the team's general manager Mitch Kupchak. He left the position in 2006.

=== Real Madrid Baloncesto club management ===
In June 2006, through his friendship with Predrag Mijatović, Divac linked up with Ramón Calderón as part of the lawyer's candidate bid for the presidency of Real Madrid. When Calderón closely won the club elections on July 2, 2006, Divac was announced as the head of operations at Real Madrid basketball club though the scope of his job description soon got reduced to consulting duties as president Calderón's adviser for basketball and club's international coordinator.

However, Divac's role in the club's day-to-day operations turned out to be largely symbolic, and he even admitted as much in a March 2007 interview for Croatian weekly Globus: "I literally do nothing and I only serve as part of the royal club's image. I only accepted the job because of Mijatović, who is currently the football director at Real". By the end of 2007, following a financial settlement between the two parties, Divac moved on from the post for which he had been reportedly receiving an annual compensation of €300,000.

=== Serbian Deputy Prime Minister's adviser ===
In October 2008, it was announced that Divac would have a political advisory role within the Serbian government as the sports, diaspora, and humanitarian advisor to the Deputy Prime Minister and Internal Affairs Minister Ivica Dačić.

=== Olympic Committee of Serbia president ===
Divac was nominated in 2000 as Yugoslavia's candidate for the Sport Commission of the International Olympic Committee in spring 2000. This candidature was withdrawn under pressure from the Milošević regime. In February 2009, Divac ran for the presidency of the Olympic Committee of Serbia against incumbent president Ivan Ćurković. He won the race after Ćurković withdrew just before the scheduled voting. In November 2012, he was re-elected as the sole candidate; the end of his second mandate coincides with the 2016 Summer Olympics in Rio de Janeiro.

In December 2014, Kosovo was accepted as a full member of the International Olympic Committee. Divac and the Serbian Olympic Committee have been criticised, chiefly by the Democratic Party of Serbia, for failing to take any effort to prevent that. Divac stated that he is not happy with the decision of the IOC, but could not have prevented it as it had already been made, and said he would accept it "in the interest of the athletes".

On May 9, 2017, Divac was succeeded by Serbian former basketball coach Božidar Maljković as the president of the Olympic Committee of Serbia.

=== Sacramento Kings front office ===
==== Initial advisory role ====
In early March 2015, Divac was hired by the Sacramento Kings as their vice president of basketball and franchise operations. Brought into the organization by the principal owner Vivek Ranadivé towards the end of a turbulent season, Divac's arrival came in the wake of head coach Michael Malone's firing and the eventual hiring of George Karl. Working alongside the team's general manager Pete D'Alessandro, Divac's initial duties with the Kings were reported to be advising the front office and coaches as well as assisting with branding and fan outreach. However, such broadly defined job responsibilities immediately led to press speculation about Divac's role within the organization that in addition to general manager D'Alessandro also featured assistant GM Mike Bratz, special assistant to the GM Mitch Richmond, director of player personnel and analytics Dean Oliver, adviser to the chairman Chris Mullin, as well as a head coach, Karl, who has always wanted to be involved in personnel issues. Within a month of Divac's hiring, ESPN's Marc Stein reported that "despite the Kings not yet announcing their new power structure, Divac is indeed already regarded as the team's top basketball official by owner Ranadivé".

On June 10, 2015, two weeks before the NBA draft, general manager D'Alessandro left the Kings by accepting a front-office position with the Denver Nuggets amid reports he did so due to being stripped of his decision-making power after Ranadivé hired Divac.

Only days before the draft, animosity between head coach Karl and the team's star center DeMarcus Cousins reignited, as Karl reportedly lobbied Divac, as well as multiple players on the Kings' roster, in order to make the case to owner Ranadive that Cousins needed to be traded. As a result, against the backdrop of Cousins calling Karl a "snake" on Twitter, Divac reportedly discussed multiple Cousins trade scenarios with various teams, but ultimately no deal got made. At the 2015 NBA draft, with the 6th pick, the Kings selected 21-year-old center Willie Cauley-Stein out of Kentucky. Less than a week following the draft, with the dissolution of the Karl—Cousins relationship on public display, the Kings' ultimately unsuccessful attempt at landing University of Kentucky head coach John Calipari to replace Karl was reported.

In early July 2015, in an effort of clearing salary cap space in order to immediately go after free agents, the Kings agreed to a trade with the Philadelphia 76ers, sending Nik Stauskas, Carl Landry, and Jason Thompson, along with the Kings' future first-round draft pick to the Sixers as well as the rights to swap first-round picks in 2016 and 2017 while receiving the rights to Sixers overseas players Artūras Gudaitis and Luka Mitrović in return. Two days later, they announced the acquisitions of two free agents: 29-year-old Marco Belinelli on a three-year US$19 million contract and 29-year-old point guard Rajon Rondo for one year for US$10 million. This was followed by signing twenty-six-year-old center Kosta Koufos for four years and US$33 million with his role envisioned as the backup for Cousins.

With the free agent signings done, Divac turned his attention to attempting to mend the relations between the team's head coach Karl and its star center Cousins ahead of the 2015–16 season, admitting publicly on July 9, 2015, on CBS Sports Radio's The Jim Rome Show that the relationship between the two "isn't pretty right now". A few days later, on July 13, 2015, during a 2015 NBA Summer League game in Las Vegas, the two shared an awkward on-camera handshake as Karl approached and Cousins reluctantly shook the coach's hand before turning away. Later that week, Divac summoned Cousins and Karl to a private counseling session.

==== General manager ====
Divac was promoted to the Kings' vice president of basketball operations and general manager on August 31, 2015.

Amid a tense and incident-filled season that saw the team briefly reach the final playoff spot in the Western Conference before unravelling with extended losing streaks in late January and early February 2016, the organization reportedly made a decision to fire their head coach George Karl during the upcoming All-Star break, a move pushed for by Divac. However, in a quick about-face, Karl got retained after meeting with Divac and reportedly pledging to make changes to address concerns within the organization about his defensive schemes and practice policies. It was later reported that the move to fire Karl on this occasion got scuttled by the Kings minority owners over financial concerns. A month and a half later, in late March 2016, Divac signed a multi-year contract extension with the organization. The team finished the season 33–49, eight games out of the playoffs, good for 10th spot in the Western Conference. Their final season in Sleep Train Arena, the team's home since 1988, it was also their first 30 plus win campaign after seven consecutive seasons of fewer than 30 wins.

Early into the team's offseason, in mid April 2016, the Kings organization fired head coach Karl, a decision made by Divac who had reportedly been pushing for it for months. Within three weeks, during which Divac interviewed head coaching candidates Sam Mitchell, Vinny Del Negro, Mike Woodson, David Blatt, Mark Jackson, Jeff Hornacek, Nate McMillan, Patrick Ewing, Elston Turner, and Corliss Williamson, the Kings hired Dave Joerger as their new head coach, signing him to a four-year deal worth US$16 million. At the 2016 NBA draft, with the 8th pick, the Kings selected Marquese Chriss out of the University of Washington, but traded him to the Phoenix Suns for rights to Bogdan Bogdanović as well as the Suns' 2016 draft 13th and 28th picks, Georgios Papagiannis and Skal Labissière, respectively.

At the 2017 NBA draft, with the 5th pick, the Kings selected point guard De'Aaron Fox out of Kentucky. At the 2018 NBA draft, the Kings selected Marvin Bagley III with the second overall pick, passing on Luka Dončić who would become an MVP candidate within two years into his NBA career. In 2018–19 season the Sacramento Kings finished 9th in the Western conference. However, the season was evaluated as successful for the Kings.

The 2019–20 NBA season was suspended in March as a result of the COVID-19 pandemic, and the Sacramento Kings were invited to the 22-team 2020 NBA Bubble. However, the Kings did not manage to qualify for the playoffs, their 14th consecutive season without a playoff appearance, and finished the season with a 31–41 record. Shortly thereafter, on August 14, 2020, Divac stepped down as general manager.

== Investments ==
Divac has been involved in many non-basketball endeavors while still actively playing in the NBA, and more so after he retired. He is an active restaurant investor in the Sacramento, California area. However, his attempts to make major investments in Serbia failed, for a variety of reasons.

The most notable affair was a highly publicized business venture—takeover bid of profitable beverage producer Knjaz Miloš. Divac's company "Apurna", in a joint venture with French dairy giant Danone, ostensibly proposed the best bid, but the takeover was aborted by the Serbia's Securities Commission, because Danone/Apurna allegedly offered extra money to small shareholders. In the repeated bid, Divac and Danone eventually withdrew and the sale went to FPP Balkan Ltd., a privatization fund from the Cayman Islands. The entire messy affair caused great friction within the Serbian government, wide speculation about corruption, resignation of the Securities Commission chief, and even a police investigation.

Another similar, though less spectacular, episode happened with 2005 Divac's attempt to take over the Večernje novosti, a Serbian high-circulation daily. He made an agreement with small shareholders to take over the company by means of registering a new company with joint capital, which would increase the share capital. However, the Serbian Government intervened and halted what should have been a mere technical move. While the attempted takeover was a "backdoor" one indeed, it was legal and similar cases had already occurred. The government ostensibly feared lack of control over the influential daily. Even though the Supreme Court of Serbia eventually ruled in Divac's favor, he withdrew from the contest, citing "friendly advice" by unnamed persons. Embittered, he decided to stop his attempts to invest in Serbia: "All of this is ugly and I'm very upset... I realized that there's no place for me in Serbia and my friends can meet me in Madrid from now on... In Serbia, some different rules are in effect, and I can't conceive them".

However, that turned out not to be true, as in October 2007 Divac got legally registered as the 100% owner of Voda Voda, a bottled water brand previously owned by businessman Vojin Đorđević. That transaction was also followed by a stir of controversy, as Đorđević publicly accused Divac of deceit, asserting that he broke a gentlemen's agreement they had, and questioning the validity of the contract that Divac presented to the Serbian Business Registers Agency. The circumstances surrounding the deal (as of November 2007) are still unclear: Divac claims that he indeed loaned some money to Đorđević's Si&Si company, which was in financial trouble, and after Đorđević failed to fulfill his part of the deal, just used the contract, already properly signed by Đorđević, to claim ownership of the company.

== Humanitarian work ==
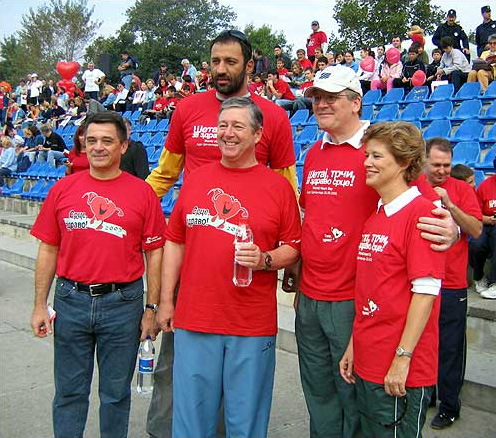
Vlade Divac (rear, center) alongside Crown Prince Alexander II in 2005, at an event for World Heart Day

Divac is a humanitarian worker, focusing on aid to children worldwide and refugees in his home country. Along with six Serbian basketball teammates, Divac established the charity called Group Seven, later renamed to "Divac's Children Foundation", and works closely with International Orthodox Christian Charities (IOCC), helping them to raise around US$500,000 for humanitarian assistance in Serbia since 1997. Divac's own foundation, presided by his wife Snežana, provided over $2,500,000 in humanitarian assistance through 1998–2007.

In 2000, the NBA named Divac as the recipient of the J. Walter Kennedy Citizenship Award. The honor is presented annually to a player, coach or athletic trainer who shows outstanding service and dedication to the community.

In late 2007, Divac founded a humanitarian organization, "You Can Too" (Serbian: Можеш и ти/Možeš i ti), with the goal of restoring abandoned homes in villages throughout Serbia and Africa, thereby providing shelter for homeless refugees. Around 7,800 of those people still live in collective centers under poor conditions, so the organization has employed itself to buy abandoned countryside houses, in an attempt to finally solve their accommodation problem.

From September 21 to 23, 2007, Divac organized an official farewell from his active basketball career in his hometown Prijepolje and Belgrade, simultaneously promoting the "You Can Too" campaign. The spectacle culminated in a gathering of Divac and his worldwide friends in front of 10,000 people outside the National Assembly building.

== In popular culture ==
In the early 1990s, the song "Vlade Divac" by Belgrade band Deca Loših Muzičara, devoted to his move to the Lakers, was a big hit; the band finally got to personally meet Divac and perform the song with him at his farewell party in 2007.

During his time with the Lakers, Divac's popularity and marketing potential, in addition to his entertaining and good-natured personality, were picked up on by the American TV industry. As a result, he appeared quite a few times on Los Angeles-based late night programmes such as The Arsenio Hall Show and The Tonight Show with Jay Leno. In 1990, he was featured in a commercial with Laker teammates A.C. Green and Mychal Thompson for the Schick brand razor company. He also appeared in American sitcoms Married... with Children and Coach, as well as in the short lived Good Sports sitcom. On the big screen Divac took part in basketball-based movies Eddie, Space Jam and Juwanna Mann. Later in his career, he appeared on Larry King Live in 1999 and The Late Late Show in 2002.

In Serbia, throughout his playing career, Divac regularly appeared in commercials pitching products ranging from Atlas Beer to Société Générale mortgage credit plans. He appeared in a national TV commercial in the United States alongside former NBA star Darryl Dawkins for Taco Bell.

Divac appeared as a special guest on Eurovision 2008. He threw a ball into the audience, which marked the beginning of televoting.

Divac features in the ESPN 30 for 30 documentary Once Brothers, where he discusses the exploits of the Yugoslavia national basketball team in the late 1980s and early 1990s and how the Yugoslav Wars tore them apart, especially in context of his broken friendship with Croatian player Dražen Petrović.

Divac appears in Boris Malagurski's documentary film The Weight of Chains, in which he talks about the 1999 NATO bombing of Yugoslavia.

In March 2020, Belgian footballer Divock Origi revealed that he was named after Divac.

== Personal life ==
Divac and his wife, Snežana, have two sons, Luka and Matija, and an adopted daughter, Petra, whose biological parents were killed by Kosovo Liberation Army snipers. On January 7, 2014, Divac's father Milenko died after injuries sustained in a car accident. Divac is fluent in three languages, Serbian, Russian and English. Divac also holds American citizenship.

== Filmography ==
=== Film ===
Year	Title	Role	Notes
1991	Driving Me Crazy	Yugo Boss	
1996	Eddie	Himself (Los Angeles Lakers)	
1996	Space Jam	Himself	
2002	Juwanna Mann	Beat Player Morse	
2006	We Are Not Angels 3: Rock & Roll Strike Back	Pretpostavljeni	

=== Selected television ===
Year	Title	Role	Notes
1991	Good Sports	Himself	Episode: "The Reviews Are In"
1992	Coach	Delivery Man	Episode: "Dateline-Bangkok"
1992	Rachel Gunn, R.N.	Father Squires	Episode: "Rachel Sees Red"
1993	Married... with Children	Vlade Divac	Episode: "A Tisket, a Tasket, Can Peg Make a Basket?"
2000	Driving Me Crazy	Gene Viglione	TV movie
2003	Crni Gruja	Vampir Toza	Episode: "Kolac"
2010	30 for 30	Himself	Episode: Once Brothers (Documentary)
2010	The Weight of Chains	Himself	Documentary

== See also ==
- List of NBA career blocks leaders
- List of NBA career personal fouls leaders
- List of NBA single-game blocks leaders
- List of Serbian NBA players

== Notes ==
Civic offices
Preceded by Ivan Ćurković	President of the Olympic Committee of Serbia; February 24, 2009 – May 9, 2017	Succeeded by Božidar Maljković
Sporting positions
Preceded by Ivica Dačić	President of KK Partizan; 2000–2004	Succeeded by Dušan Pavlović
Preceded by Pete D'Alessandro	General manager of the Sacramento Kings; 2015–2020	Succeeded by Monte McNair
