= Once Brothers =

American TV documentary

- Promotional poster for the film
- Written by: Michael Tolajian
- Directed by: Michael Tolajian
- Narrated by: Vlade Divac
- Theme music composer: Joel Goodman
- Country of origin: United States
- Original languages: English; Some interviews in Serbo-Croatian

Production
- Executive producers: Dion Cocoros; Danny Meisles
- Producer: Zak Levitt
- Cinematography: Michael Winik
- Editors: Sean Kelly, Zak Levitt, Michael Tolajian

Original release
- Release: October 12, 2010

Once Brothers is a 2010 sports documentary film written and directed by Michael Tolajian. It was co-produced by ESPN and NBA Entertainment for ESPN's 30 for 30 series.

The film chronicles the relationship of two basketball players from SFR Yugoslavia—Vlade Divac (Serbia) and Dražen Petrović (Croatia). The duo played together on the Yugoslavia national basketball team from 1986 to 1990 and were at one time close friends, but the Yugoslav Wars drove them apart emotionally, as they came from opposing sides. Petrović died in an automobile accident in 1993 before the two could reconcile; much of film focuses on Divac's regret that they were never able to resolve their differences.

Participants in the film include: Toni Kukoč, Dino Rađa, Žarko Paspalj, Clyde Drexler, Danny Ainge, Rick Adelman, Kenny Anderson, Derrick Coleman, Bill Fitch, Larry Bird, Jan Hubbard, Magic Johnson, Jerry West, Aleksandar Petrović, Biserka Petrović, etc.

== Release ==
The film's first public showing took place on 10 October 2010 at the Hamptons International Film Festival. Two days later on 12 October it had its television premiere on ESPN.

Following a theater run in the country, the film aired on Radio Television of Serbia's RTS1 in prime time on Thursday, 26 May 2011.

== Reaction and critical reception ==
=== United States ===
Dan Devine of the Ball Don't Lie sports blog feels Once Brothers "is exactly the kind of presentation 30 for 30 was meant to produce—an enthralling recounting of a forgotten or underappreciated story about how sports and capital-letters Real Life interact" and sees its biggest asset, among many of them, to be "the honesty of Divac, Kukoč, and Rađa in discussing the emotional toll that the war took on them".

Michael Tully of hammertonail.com sees the film as "being about many different things at once—a history lesson, a touching interpersonal drama, and a positive reaffirmation that the American Dream still exists and isn't a completely silly construct" and labels it "a very strong work, in which the grand scope of the Yugoslav Wars of the early 1990s is personalized through the relationship—and unfortunate falling out—between former NBA stars Vlade Divac and Dražen Petrović".

Though mentioning the movie was "probably too long", objecting in particular to some of the childhood material about Vlade and Dražen as well as to lesser extent to some of Vlade's travelogue before he gets to Croatia being included in the film, Alan Sepinwall of HitFix still thinks it "did a nice job of telling the sad story of how politics tore apart that great Yugoslavian team, and the friendship between Divac and Petrovic".

Writing for the Slant Magazine blog, Jason Bellamy summarizes Once Brothers as an intimate tale that paints a vast panorama, but sees its long intro as necessary because "a good number of average [American] sports fans might not even remember Divac and Petrovic, and even many legitimate NBA fans are unlikely to know much about that duo's European careers, not to mention the outline of the war in the former Yugoslavia". He concludes by opining that "though not the absolute best film in the 30 for 30 series, Once Brothers might be the film that best encapsulates the kind of personal, outside-the-mainstream storytelling that characterizes the series as a whole".

David Cassilo on the SLAM Magazine blog described the film as mainly being Divac's story about dealing with the division that comes between him (a Serb) and all of the Croats that were once his teammates on the Yugoslavian national team, praising it as a must-see for any NBA fan because "within the main story is the story of how an international player adjusts to the NBA. Divac and his former Yugoslavian teammates express all of the obstacles that are in the way for a foreign-born player, including style of play, language and the lack of belief by others that they could actually cut it in the NBA".

Writing for The A.V. Club, Scott Tobias had mixed feelings about the movie: "For all its earnestness and nobility, Once Brothers is still very much an NBA Entertainment production, following Divac's 'journey' to a conclusion that's as disappointingly precooked as a VH-1 Behind The Music special". He continues by saying the film has a great story, but that it's also "framed in a contrived way with Divac telling us that his eldest son, an 18-year-old, wants to know what life was like when he was his age, and so into the Wayback Machine we go". Tobias also pontificates on Petrović's decision to sever his friendship with Divac and presents two reasons—the one that, like Kukoč and Rađa, Petrović was also afraid of the reaction back home in Croatia if he continued to associate with Divac and the other that he was genuinely offended by Divac's actions with the Croatian flag while maybe having a cause to disbelieve Divac's explanation about doing it out of loyalty to a unified Yugoslavia as both equally likely, before concluding that because Petrović isn't around to tell his side of the story, "Once Brothers does feel a little unbalanced and self-serving, which is not to say Divac is being disingenuous". Tobias ends by saying the scene with Divac walking through Zagreb is the best one in the entire movie, but that it also has a problem of being "just another step in Divac's scripted road to reconciliation, which ends predictably with a casual conversation with Petrovic's mother and a visit to his friend's grave", before concluding that "Once Brothers has some moving scenes despite itself, but the whole production feels as spontaneous as a frozen pizza—just heat and serve".

=== Croatia ===
Croatian media generally complained over the omission of Stojko Vranković, a close friend of Petrović's, who, unlike Divac, was in constant contact with him throughout 1991–1993. It also pointed out several factual inaccuracies in the film such as the claim that this was Divac's first time visiting Zagreb and Croatia since the war when in fact he had already been there in September 2008 at which time he visited the Dražen Petrović Museum.

The reaction to the film from those in Croatia with personal ties to the topic was mixed.

Vranković, who suited up for Yugoslavia in four major competitions (all four with both Divac and Petrović as teammates) and whose two seasons in the NBA overlapped with both players' time in the league, did not watch the movie. However, after having it summarized for him by Croatian journalists, he mentioned several details from the 1991–1992 period, which he claims ultimately led to Petrović severing his friendship with Divac. Vranković specifically talked about having Divac and his wife Snežana over to his house in Boston in October 1991 (during NBA preseason when Divac's Los Angeles Lakers came to play his Boston Celtics) where they discussed Divac's flag incident from Argentina long into the night. Divac then left for Paris with the Lakers to play at the McDonald's Open where he was reportedly asked by Spanish newspaper As about the Yugoslav national team's appearance at the upcoming 1992 Olympics in light of Vranković's and Petrović's statements that they want to play for Croatia. According to Vranković, Divac's response included a feeling the Yugoslav team will stay together and a surprise at Vranković's and Petrović's statements about wanting to play for Croatia since that country doesn't even exist, all of which, Vranković says, he and Petrović didn't appreciate when they saw it. Still, Vranković claims that the ultimate falling out between Petrović and Divac happened on 4 March 1992, when the New Jersey Nets came to play the Lakers at The Forum in Los Angeles: "Dražen later told me about taking issue with something Divac did in that game. Following a matchup versus Divac, Dražen fell on the floor expecting a foul and Divac stepped on him. That was the end in Dražen's eyes".

Zdravko Radulović, who had participated in two major competitions with the Yugoslav national team, 1988 Olympics in Seoul and EuroBasket 1989 in Zagreb, with Divac and Petrović on the roster both times, revealed to have watched the film multiple times, adding: "It was a good documentary. I know Divac and I think he was very earnest about the things he said in the movie. While we were on the national team, their [Divac's and Dražen's] relationship wasn't all that close. To all of us on those national team rosters, Dražen—who was a bit older and had already been playing abroad in Real Madrid—was an idol. I believe the two of them became close friends once they both went to the NBA at the same time in 1989 because being together made coping with life in the new world easier".

On the other hand, Franjo Arapović, who had also represented Yugoslavia in two major competitions—1986 FIBA World Championship and 1988 Olympics, both times sharing a roster with Petrović and Divac—had a strongly negative reaction to the film, dismissing it as "pure propaganda" and questioning its truthfulness by claiming "90% of the movie is a pure lie". Though confirming the national team functioned like a family, he also disputed the friendship and closeness between Petrović and Divac: "Stojko Vranković was Dražen's best friend. Dražen had nothing with Divac".

Zoran Čutura, a four-time participant in major competitions with Yugoslavia (three of those coming with both Divac and Petrović) refused to watch the movie, opining that it's "pointless, needless, and meaningless" while adding: "Personal friendships and internal relations within a sports team are a category that's very difficult to grasp and understand for an outsider, and I see no point in trying to explain them rationally. I'm not sure about the credibility of a portrayal of a relationship between two guys in a sports team, especially when one of them is very much dead while the other one is very much alive. Many things happened in the calendar of our lives since then, and explaining player relations, chemistry and circumstances that this team, which was unique in every way, functioned in is lacking common decency, especially when it's done from an American perspective".

Some of the reaction to the film in Croatia, primarily that by Franjo Arapović as well as to a lesser extent by Stojko Vranković, prompted media outlets to further inquire with Dražen Petrović's brother Aleksandar, also a professional basketball player who represented Yugoslavia at four competitions (two of those with both Divac and Dražen on the team), about the extent of the relationship his brother had with Divac. He said: "When two basketball masters spend five years in a national team as roommates it is very logical for them to become close friends. Dražen and Vlade were great friends and I was a first-hand witness to this in 1986 and 1987 when I played with them on the national team. Now, I believe Stojko Vranković's comments were in reaction to the claim that my late brother and Divac were 'best friends'. Vranković knows Dražen since they were little kids and he was very shaken up over my brother's death. All the other things are nonsense that's not worth commenting on. Dražen and Divac were most definitely good friends who shared secrets, joy, despair, fame ... everything. Both on and off the court. They kept in telephone contact when they were in the NBA".

Reaction to the film in Croatia continued well after its premiere. In late October 2016, on the occasion of 52nd anniversary of Petrović's birth, Jutarnji list interviewed his close childhood friend and former KK Šibenka teammate Fabijan Žurić who brought up the movie: "Dražen had four close friends—myself, my brother Dubravko Žurić, Denis Erceg, and Stojko Vranković. And that's it. Everyone else trying to claim him is lying, and same goes for Divac's movie because it was only us who were Dražen's true friends and if we were to make a film it would be called Always Brothers, not Once Brothers. That movie got made and got praised, but a lot of it isn't true. Just one of many things in it that are not accurate is the whole flag thing. That wasn't why they got driven apart—that was just the story for the newspapers. The real reason they fell out was the game during which they had a hustle situation going after a loose ball, Dražen fell on the floor and Divac stomped on him with his shoe. Dražen retaliated by cursing him out severely and that's how their "great" friendship ended. That was never a great friendship to begin with and the flag incident was never a problem between them. All of this is hurtful to us [Dražen's actual close friends] because Divac is continually being presented as Dražen's great friend, which isn't true".

== See also ==
- List of basketball films
