= Dražen Petrović =

Yugoslav-Croatian basketball player (1964–1993)

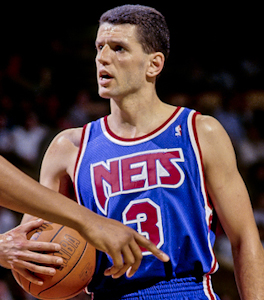
- Petrović with the New Jersey Nets in 1992

Personal information
- Born: 22 October 1964 Šibenik, SR Croatia, SFR Yugoslavia
- Died: 7 June 1993 (aged 28) Denkendorf, Germany
- Listed height: 6 ft 5 in (1.96 m)
- Listed weight: 195 lb (88 kg)

Career information
- NBA draft: 1986: 3rd round, 60th overall pick
- Drafted by: Portland Trail Blazers
- Playing career: 1979–1993
- Position: Shooting guard
- Number: 4, 9, 10, 5, 44, 3

Career history
- 1979–1983: Šibenka
- 1984–1988: Cibona
- 1988–1989: Real Madrid
- 1989–1991: Portland Trail Blazers
- 1991–1993: New Jersey Nets

Career highlights
- All-NBA Third Team (1993); 2× EuroLeague champion (1985, 1986); FIBA European Selection (1987); 4× Euroscar (1986, 1989, 1992, 1993); 2× Mr. Europa Award (1986, 1993); 2× FIBA Saporta Cup champion (1987, 1989); 2× FIBA Saporta Cup Finals Top Scorer (1987, 1989); FIBA Korać Cup Finals Top Scorer (1988); Spanish League Top Scorer (1989); Spanish Cup winner (1989); Spanish Cup Final Top Scorer (1989); Yugoslav League champion (1985); 3× Yugoslav Cup winner (1985, 1986, 1988); FIBA World Championship MVP (1986); FIBA EuroBasket MVP (1989); Best Athlete of Yugoslavia (1985); Yugoslav Sportsman of the Year (1985); Croatian Sportsman of the Year (1985, 1986); FIBA's 50 Greatest Players (1991); Olympic Order (1993); 50 Greatest EuroLeague Contributors (2008); No. 3 retired by Brooklyn Nets; No. 10 retired by Cibona

Career NBA statistics
- Points: 4,461 (15.4 ppg)
- Rebounds: 669 (2.3 rpg)
- Assists: 701 (2.4 apg)
- Stats at NBA.com
- Stats at Basketball Reference
- Basketball Hall of Fame
- FIBA Hall of Fame
Medals
Men's basketball
Representing Yugoslavia
Olympic Games
Bronze medal – third place	1984 Los Angeles
Silver medal – second place	1988 Seoul
FIBA World Cup
Bronze medal – third place	1986 Spain
Gold medal – first place	1990 Argentina
FIBA EuroBasket
Bronze medal – third place	1987 Greece
Gold medal – first place	1989 Yugoslavia
Universiade
Silver medal – second place	1983 Edmonton
Gold medal – first place	1987 Zagreb
European U18 Championship
Silver medal – second place	1982 Bulgaria	Under-18
Representing Croatia
Olympic Games
Silver medal – second place	1992 Barcelona

Dražen Petrović (Croatian pronunciation: [drǎʒen pětroʋitɕ]; 22 October 1964 – 7 June 1993) was a Yugoslav and Croatian professional basketball player. A shooting guard, he initially achieved success playing professional basketball in Europe in the 1980s with Cibona and Real Madrid before joining the National Basketball Association (NBA) in 1989.

A star on multiple international basketball stages, Petrović earned two silver medals (1988, 1992) and one bronze (1984) at the Summer Olympic Games, a gold (1990) and a bronze (1986) at the FIBA World Cup, and a gold (1989) and a bronze (1987) at the FIBA EuroBasket. He was the FIBA World Championship MVP in 1986 and the FIBA EuroBasket MVP in 1989. With Cibona Zagreb, Petrović also won two consecutive EuroLeague championships in 1985 and 1986. He first represented Yugoslavia's senior national team and later Croatia's senior national team. He earned four Euroscars and was named Mr. Europa twice. In 1985, he received the Golden Badge award for the best athlete of Yugoslavia.

Seeking a bigger arena after his career started in Europe, Petrović joined the NBA in 1989, as a member of the Portland Trail Blazers. After playing mostly off the bench that year, Petrović experienced a breakthrough following a trade to the New Jersey Nets. While starting for the Nets, he became one of the league's best shooting guards, and his .4374 three-point field goal percentage ranks fourth in NBA history. (Note: Minimum 250 career three-point field goals made.) He was named one of FIBA's 50 Greatest Players in 1991. On 7 June 1993, Petrović's career and life were cut short after he died in a car accident in Germany at the age of 28.

In 1993, Petrović's jersey number 3 was retired by the Nets, and the Dražen Petrović Basketball Hall was named in his honor. He also received the Olympic Order in 1993. In 2002, he was posthumously enshrined into the Naismith Memorial Basketball Hall of Fame. In 2006, the Dražen Petrović Award was created in his honor. In 2007, he was posthumously inducted into the FIBA Hall of Fame. He was named one of the 50 Greatest EuroLeague Contributors in 2008. In 2013, he was voted the best European Basketball player in history, by players at the 2013 FIBA EuroBasket.

Petrović is considered to have helped usher in today's flood of European players in the NBA. In Croatia, he is viewed as a national hero.

== Early years ==
Born in Šibenik, Yugoslavia (present-day Croatia), Dražen Petrović was the second child of Jovan "Jole" Petrović, a police officer, and Biserka (née Mikulandra), a librarian. His father was born in a Serb family in Zagora, near Trebinje in Bosnia and Herzegovina. His mother was born in Bilice, near Šibenik, and was from a traditional conservative Croat family, devoutly Catholic. The couple's eldest child, Aleksandar, was the first to play basketball and rose to become one of the top point guards in the former Yugoslavia. The Petrović brothers are second cousins to the Serbian basketball player Dejan Bodiroga.

=== Šibenka (1979–1983) ===
At the age of 13, Petrović started playing in the youth selections of the local club Šibenka; at the age of 15, he had already made the club's first team, just as Šibenka had earned a place in the Yugoslav national first division. With young Petrović as the star of the team, Šibenka reached the final of the third level Pan-European club competition, the FIBA Korać Cup twice (1981–82 and 1982–83), where they lost to the French League club Limoges CSP both times. In 1983, the 18-year-old Petrović hit two free throws in Šibenka's victory over Bosna Sarajevo in the final playoff game of the Yugoslavian League's 1982–83 season's club championship. However, on the day after the club won the championship, the Basketball Federation of Yugoslavia stripped the title from Šibenka, because of irregularities in refereeing. The league's championship was then awarded to Bosna, after Šibenka refused to play in a rematch.

Petrović increased his scoring numbers in each successive season that he played with Šibenka. In the 1979–80 Yugoslav FFL season, he scored 13 points in 16 games, for an average of 0.8 points per game. In the 1980–81 Yugoslav FFL season, he scored 39 points in 20 games, for an average of 2.0 points per game. In the 1981–82 Yugoslav FFL season, he scored 392 points in 24 games, for an average of 16.3 points per game. In the 1982–83 Yugoslav FFL season, he scored 758 points in 31 games, for an average of 24.5 points per game. In total, he scored 1,202 points in 91 games played with Šibenka in the Yugoslav first division, for a scoring average of 13.2 points per game.

== Rise to European stardom ==
=== Cibona Zagreb (1984–1988) ===
==== 1984–85 season ====
After a year's mandatory service in the Yugoslav military, Petrović joined his older brother Aco and moved to Cibona Zagreb, to form what was at that time, the best back court duo in Europe. In his first season in Cibona, Petrović won both the national Yugoslav League championship and the Yugoslav National Cup title. In national domestic league play, in the 1984–85 Yugoslav FFL season, Petrović averaged 32.5 points per game.

On 6 December 1984, in the 1984–85 season of Europe's top-level club competition, the FIBA European Champions Cup (EuroLeague), Petrović scored 44 points in a game against the Spanish League club Real Madrid. He scored 29 of the 44 points in the second half of the game. Petrović also scored 36 points in the league's 1985 Final against Real Madrid. Cibona won the game, by a score of 87–78, and the win brought the club their first top-tier level European Champions Cup title. That season, Petrović scored a total of 463 points in 15 games played, for a scoring average of 30.9 points per game.

==== 1985–86 season ====
On 5 October 1985, in a Yugoslav First Federal League game against Union Olimpija Ljubljana, Petrović scored 112 points, in Cibona's 158–77 blowout win. He scored 67 of the 112 points in the first half of the game. During the game, Petrović shot 40/60 from the field, 10/20 from 3-point range, and 22/22 from the free-throw line. The 112 points scored was the most points ever scored in a single game in the history of the Yugoslav First Federal League. It broke the league's previous single-game scoring record of 74 points, which was set in 1962, by Radivoj Korać. Korać achieved that record while playing with OKK Beograd, in a game against Mladost Zagreb.

Olimpija Ljubljana had failed to fulfill their player registration administrative obligations in time for the game. Olimpija general manager Radovan Lorbek was reportedly late with submitting a registration letter to the Basketball Federation of Yugoslavia (KSJ) headquarters in Belgrade. That rendered their entire men's first team roster ineligible for the Yugoslav First Federal League's regular season opening game, and forced them to instead field players for the game from their youth systems. Olimpija didn't have an under-18 youth squad that season so the club went to Zagreb to play the game with younger players. in the under-16 and under-17 age groups, which included: Igor Đurović, Matjaž Strmole, Jože Maček, Dag Kralj, Tine Erjavec, Jure Zorčič, Gregor Stražiščar, Andrej Novina, and Tine Merzelj.

Cibona, for their part, decided to use a mixed roster for the game, consisting of players from their youth system, plus their senior men's team's twenty-one-year-old Dražen Petrović, who broke Korać's single-game Yugoslav League scoring record of 74 points. Petrović scored 112 points in the game; before the game, he had reportedly announced his intention to leave the game once he had surpassed Korać's 74 points record. Petrović was one of only five Cibona players to score that day.

From November 1985, Petrović began partnering in the backcourt with another high-scoring player, newly arrived shooting guard Danko Cvjetićanin, brought in as replacement for Aco Petrović who was away serving his mandatory Yugoslav People's Army (JNA) stint.

Overall, over the 1985–86 Yugoslav League regular season and playoffs, Petrović scored a total of 1,241 points in 30 games played, for a scoring average of 41.4 points per game. That season, Petrović also won another Yugoslav National Cup title with Cibona. On 7 February 1986, Petrović scored 55 points in a Yugoslav Cup game against Union Olimpija Ljubljana. He also scored 46 points in the 1986 Yugoslav Cup's Final against Cibona's old rivals Bosna Sarajevo.

On 4 December 1985, in a 1985–86 season FIBA European Champions Cup (EuroLeague) game against the Israeli Super League club Maccabi Tel Aviv, Petrović scored 44 points. In the same European Champions Cup season, on 11 December 1985, he had 47 points and 25 assists in a game against the then reigning Italian League champions Simac Milano. In another European Champions Cup game that season, on 16 January 1986, Petrović scored 49 points, and had 20 assists against the Spanish League club Real Madrid. On 22 January 1986, in a European Champions Cup game against the French League club Limoges, Petrović made ten 3-pointers, including seven in a row during a first-half stretch, for a final tally of 51 points and 10 assists in the game. The 51 points scored was also his personal career-high scored in a single EuroLeague game.

Petrović won his second straight FIBA European Champions Cup (EuroLeague) title with Cibona, as he scored 22 points in the league's 1986 Final, in which Cibona defeated the USSR Premier League club Žalgiris Kaunas, which starred Arvydas Sabonis. In the 1985–86 European Champions Cup (EuroLeague) season, Petrović scored a total of 555 points in 15 games played, for a scoring average of 37.0 points per game.

The season ended with Cibona losing the Yugoslav league playoff final series to KK Zadar. Following an opening game win, Petrović controversially sat out game 2 away in Zadar, ostensibly due to a pre-game warm-up injury, leading to accusations of tanking out of desire to win the title on home court in front of their own fans. Cibona lost game 2 thus setting up the deciding game 3 at home in Zagreb at the sold out Dom sportova. However, in one of the biggest upsets in Yugoslav League history, despite having a double-digit lead in the second half, Cibona ended up losing game 3 in double overtime with Petrović fouling out during first overtime with 39 points scored.

==== 1986–87 season ====
In the 1986–87 Yugoslav FFL season, Petrović scored a total of 932 points in 25 games played, for a scoring average of 37.3 points per game. In that same season, Cibona competed in the European-wide secondary level FIBA European Cup Winners' Cup competition. Petrović led Cibona to the championship, as he scored 28 points against the Italian League club Scavolini Pesaro, in the league's 1986–87 season Final. It was the third straight European-wide club championship for Petrović and Cibona.

In the 1986–87 FIBA European Cup Winners Cup season, Petrović scored a total of 270 points in 8 games played, for a scoring average of 33.8 points per game.

==== 1987–88 season ====
With Cibona, Petrović again won the Yugoslav National Cup title in 1988. In the 1987–88 Yugoslav FFL season, Petrović scored a total of 860 points in 24 games played, for a scoring average of 35.8 points per game. In that same season, Cibona competed in Europe's third-level club competition, the FIBA Korać Cup. On 14 October 1987, Petrović scored 62 points in a 1987–88 FIBA Korać Cup season game against the Finnish League club KTP Kotka. Petrović led Cibona to the Finals of the Korać Cup, where they lost to the Spanish League club Real Madrid. During the Korać Cup season, Petrović scored a total of 401 points in 12 games played, for a scoring average of 33.4 points per game.

During his four seasons with Cibona, Petrović scored a total of 3,911 points, in 106 games played in the national Yugoslav First Federal League, for a scoring average of 36.9 points per game. With Cibona, he also scored a total of 559 points, in 20 games played, for a scoring average of 28.0 points per game, in the Yugoslav Cup competition. In the three Pan-European club competitions that he played in with Cibona, he scored a total of 1,689 points in 50 games played, for a scoring average of 33.8 points per game.

With both Šibenka and Cibona, Petrović's career scoring numbers in the Yugoslav First Federal League were 5,113 points scored, in 197 games played, for a career scoring average of 26.0 points per game. In the FIBA European Champions Cup (EuroLeague), Petrović scored a career total of 1,018 points in 30 games played, for a career scoring average of 33.9 points per game.

=== Real Madrid (1988–1989) ===
After his string of very successful seasons with Cibona Zagreb, Petrović needed new challenges that Cibona and the Yugoslav First Federal League could no longer offer him. The NBA's Portland Trail Blazers had already used their third-round draft pick on the young Petrović, in the 1986 NBA draft, but he had decided to postpone his departure to the United States. In 1988, rather than go to the NBA, he instead signed with Liga ACB club Real Madrid, for around US$4 million in net income.

At that time, Yugoslav sporting laws stipulated that players could not professionally move abroad until they had reached the age of 28. Petrović was still only 23 when he signed with Real Madrid. In 2014, José Antonio Arízaga, the sports agent who played a key role in Petrović's 1988 summer transfer from Cibona to Real, recalled a few details from the transaction: "I spoke to Mirko Novosel, Dražen's head coach at Cibona, and he told me two things. One, every problem in Yugoslavia can be taken care of with the right amount of money, and two, if Dražen leaves, every other player under 28 will be leaving and it'll be chaos. So, you can imagine all the individuals I had to bribe and all the places where I had to pay up, in order to circumvent this law".

==== 1988–89 season ====
Petrović helped Real to win the title of the 1989 edition of the Copa del Rey de Baloncesto, over their Catalan rivals, Barcelona. In the Spanish ACB League's Finals, Real Madrid narrowly lost to Barcelona, in the fifth and decisive game of the series. In the Spanish League's 1988–89 ACB season, Petrović was the league's regular season top scorer. Including the playoffs, he scored a total of 1,327 points, in 47 games played, for a scoring average of 28.2 points per game. Petrović's first season in Spain's ACB was also his last, but he still holds the ACB's single-game Finals records for the most points scored, with 42, and for the most three-pointers made, with 8.

In European-wide club competition, Real Madrid competed in the European secondary level FIBA European Cup Winners' Cup. On 14 March 1989, in the 1988–89 Cup Winners' Cup Final against the Italian League club Snaidero Caserta, Petrović tied his previous best scoring performance in a European-wide club competition with 62 points.

== Move to the NBA ==
Petrović was pressured to join the NBA, by the Trail Blazers, who had drafted him 60th overall in 1986. Being motivated by the potential new challenges that the NBA presented, Petrović finally decided to try to establish himself in the league. He left Spain rather abruptly, at the end of the season; the Blazers assisted him in the process, by buying out his contract with Real Madrid, for as much as US$1.5 million. Petrović finally joined the Blazers for the 1989–90 season.

== NBA career ==
=== Portland Trail Blazers (1989–1991) ===
As a member of the Portland Trail Blazers, the reigning La Gazzetta dello Sport Euroscar European Player of the Year saw limited playing time. He was behind All-Star Clyde Drexler and Terry Porter on the depth chart. He had difficulty being productive in the limited role the Blazers had for him. In his rookie year during the 1989–90 NBA season, he averaged 7.4 points in 12 minutes per game.

The following season, veteran guard Danny Ainge was added to the team, and Petrović's playing time dropped further to 7 minutes a game. In many statements made prior to arriving in Portland, Petrović had said he saw a lack of playing time as the only possible obstacle to his success in the NBA. He was determined to be a success in basketball's highest arena. His lack of playing time during his second season in the league brought Petrović's frustration to a climax: "I have nothing to say to Adelman any more and vice versa. Eighteen months have passed by, too long. I have to leave to prove how much I am worth. Never in my life did I sit on the bench and I don't intend to do that in Portland."

At his insistence, 38 games into the season (20 of which held no playing time for Petrović), a three-way trade with the Denver Nuggets sent him to the New Jersey Nets in exchange for a first-round pick in the following draft and Walter Davis, who was sent from Denver to Portland.

=== New Jersey Nets (1991–1993) ===
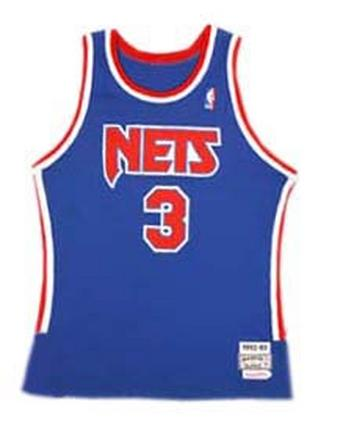
Petrović's Nets jersey; his number 3 was retired by the team following his death.

On 23 January 1991, Petrović became a member of the New Jersey Nets. He joined a team that had not reached the playoffs since 1986, but had rookie Derrick Coleman, the number one selection from the 1990 draft. He was immediately given a role on the floor, with 20.5 minutes per game. His scoring over the remaining 43 games increased to 12.6 points per game, one of the league's best points-per-minute ratios. The following year, he and Coleman were joined by Kenny Anderson, giving the team a third talented new addition, and forming was expected to grow into a "big three". Petrović was made a starter for the 1991–92 season, his first full season with the Nets. "Petro", as the Americans had dubbed him, did not miss a single game. On 13 March 1992, Petrović scored 39 points while shooting 65% from the field, and 100% (3 of 3) from 3 point range, in a 110–108 win against the Boston Celtics. His determination, hard work and aggressive on-court demeanor established him as a team leader. In 36.9 minutes on the floor he averaged 20.6 points. Petrović led the Nets in field-goal shooting and free-throw shooting, and his field goal percentage of 51% placed him near the top of all NBA guards. More importantly, his success translated into success for the team. The Nets made the playoffs, recording 14 more wins than the previous year. On 23 April 1992, in Game 1 of their first round matchup against the Cleveland Cavaliers, Petrović scored a playoff career-high 40 points. The Nets would eventually lose the best of 5 series 3 games to 1. The following season saw Petrović increase his scoring average to 22.3 ppg, 11th best in the league.

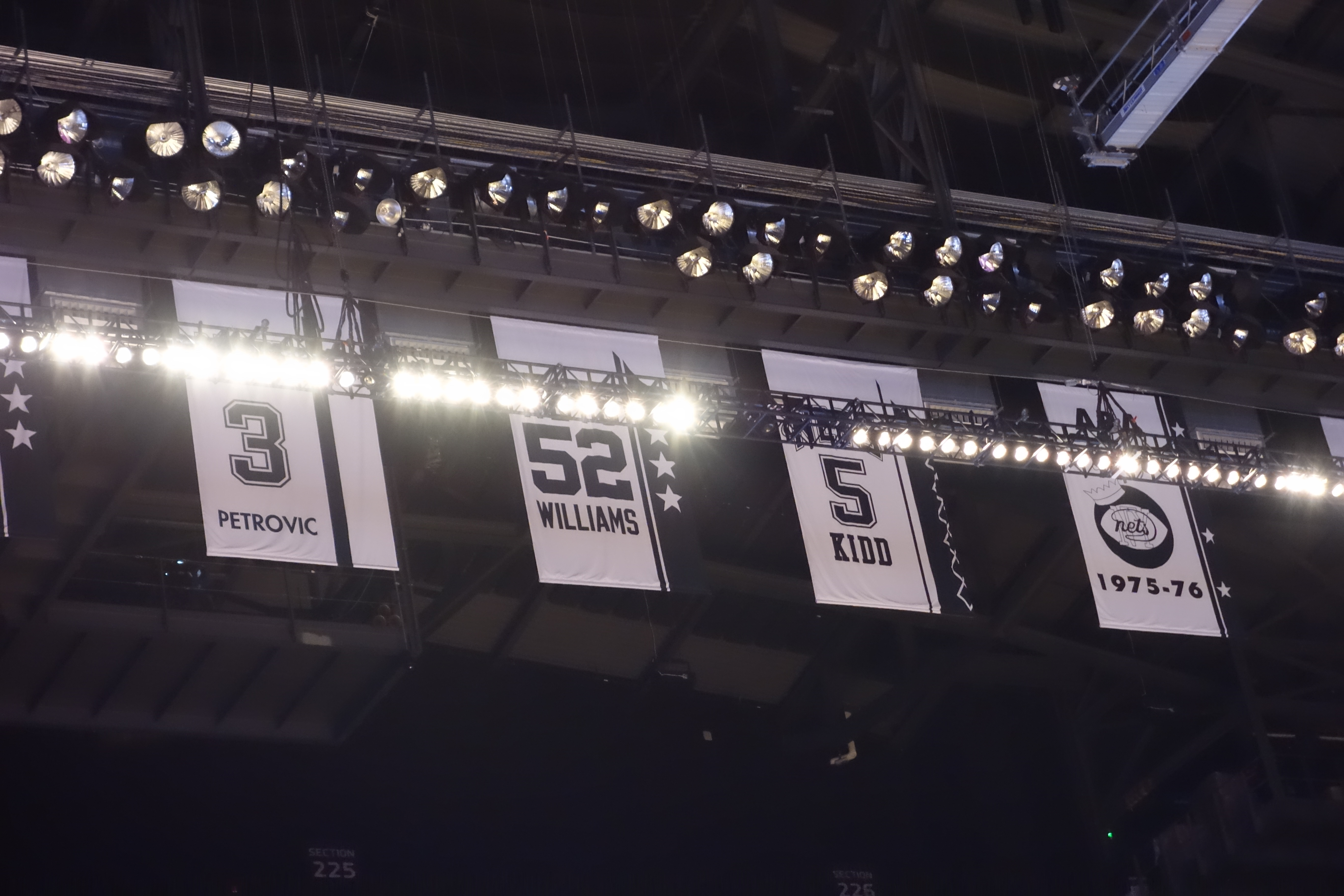
Petrović's No. 3 hanging along with other notable Nets players, pictured in October 2018

On 6 December 1992, he was named MVP of the Week. On 4 February 1993, Petrović played a career-high 53 minutes and scored 35 points in an overtime win against the Seattle SuperSonics. For the second season in a row he shot 45% from the three-point arc. His field goal percentage of 52% was again near the top for all guards. American media honored him with a selection to the All-NBA Third Team. However, he did not receive an invitation to the 1993 All-Star game.

== Career statistics ==
Legend
GP	Games played	GS	Games started	MPG	Minutes per game
FG%	Field goal percentage	3P%	3-point field goal percentage	FT%	Free throw percentage
RPG	Rebounds per game	APG	Assists per game	SPG	Steals per game
BPG	Blocks per game	PPG	Points per game	**Bold**	Career high

=== NBA ===
==== Regular season ====
Year	Team	GP	GS	MPG	FG%	3P%	FT%	RPG	APG	SPG	BPG	PPG
1989–90	Portland	77	0	12.6	.485	**.459**	.844	1.4	1.5	.3	.0	7.6
1990–91	Portland	18	0	7.4	.451	.167	.682	1.0	1.1	.3	.0	4.4
1990–91	New Jersey	43	0	20.5	.500	.373	.861	2.1	1.5	.9	.0	12.6
1991–92	New Jersey	**82**	**82**	36.9	.508	.444	.808	**3.1**	3.1	**1.3**	.1	20.6
1992–93	New Jersey	70	67	**38.0**	**.518**	.449	**.870**	2.7	**3.5**	**1.3**	**.2**	**22.3**
Career		290	149	26.4	.506	.437	.841	2.3	2.4	.9	.1	15.4

=== Playoffs ===
Year	Team	GP	GS	MPG	FG%	3P%	FT%	RPG	APG	SPG	BPG	PPG
1990	Portland	**20**	0	12.7	.440	.313	.583	1.6	1.0	.3	.0	6.1
1992	New Jersey	4	4	**40.8**	**.539**	**.333**	**.846**	**2.5**	**3.3**	**1.0**	**.3**	**24.3**
1993	New Jersey	5	**5**	38.6	.455	**.333**	.800	1.8	1.8	.4	.0	15.6
Career		29	9	21.0	.474	.324	.696	1.8	1.4	.4	.0	10.2

=== EuroLeague ===
Legend
GP	Games played	GS	Games started	MPG	Minutes per game
FG%	Field-goal percentage	3P%	3-point field-goal percentage	FT%	Free-throw percentage
RPG	Rebounds per game	APG	Assists per game	SPG	Steals per game
BPG	Blocks per game	PPG	Points per game	PIR	Performance index rating
**Bold**	Career high	†	Won a EuroLeague championship

Year	Team	GP	GS	MPG	FG%	3P%	FT%	RPG	APG	SPG	BPG	PPG	PIR
1984–85†	Cibona Zagreb	15	—	—	—	—	—	—	—	—	—	30.9	—
1985–86†	Cibona Zagreb	15	—	—	—	—	—	—	—	—	—	**37.0**	—
Career		30	—	—	—	—	—	—	—	—	—	—	—

== National team career ==
=== Yugoslavia ===
Petrović's national team debut came at the age of 15, at the Under-18 Balkan Championship in Turkey, where the Yugoslavia junior team won the bronze. The young man regularly played for the Yugoslavia national team in the Balkan Championships, also winning gold with the junior team and silver with the senior team. He also brought back the silver from the 1982 FIBA Europe Under-18 Championship in Bulgaria.

Petrovic with Yugoslavia in 1986

The 1984 Summer Olympics were Petrović's first competition of a grand scale with the Yugoslavia senior national team, and the bronze medal won in Los Angeles that summer became his first Olympic medal. Third place was also earned at the 1986 FIBA World Championship, remembered for the last minute thriller in the semi-final game against the Soviet Union. Petrović was named the MVP of the tournament. At the 1987 EuroBasket, Petrović again returned with bronze, as Yugoslavia lost to the hosts and gold medalists Greece. The University Games, held in Zagreb in 1987, saw the Yugoslavian squad with Petrović win the gold. In the 1988 Summer Olympics, Yugoslavia with Petrović, earned 2nd place, as they lost once more to the Soviet powerhouse.

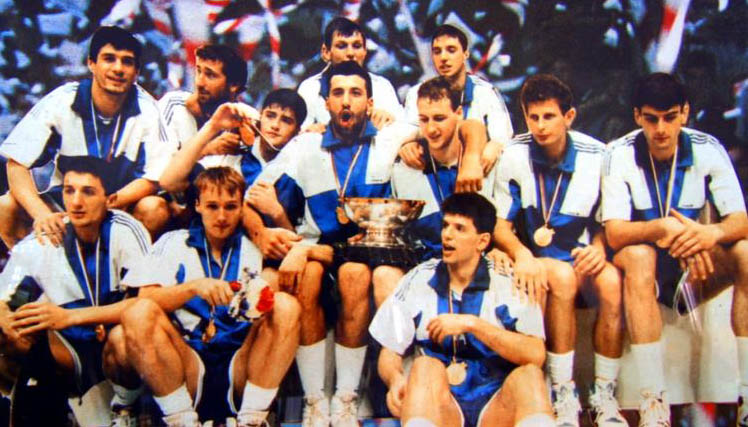
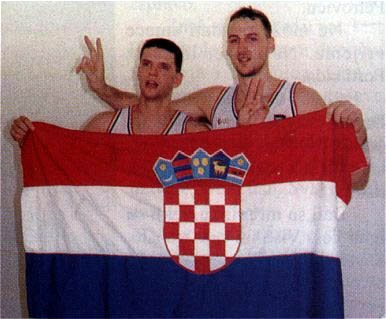
Two moments of Petrović with the two national teams where he played: (left) with the Yugoslavia celebrating (first from right, at bottom) after winning the EuroBasket 1989; (right): with teammate Dino Rađa, holding the flag of Croatia

An excellent club season with Real Madrid was topped by Petrović's 1989 accomplishment with the Yugoslavia national team: at the EuroBasket in Zagreb, the young Yugoslavian team went all the way, defeating Greece more than comfortably in the championship game. Petrović was the tournament's second leading scorer and Most Valuable Player.

The very next year, the summer in between the two most frustrating seasons of his professional career, as he struggled for playing time with the Trail Blazers, Petrović was again making history with the national team, as Yugoslavia became world champions, after beating the Soviet Union for the gold in Buenos Aires, at the 1990 FIBA World Championship.

Overall, Petrović represented Yugoslavia's senior national team in 155 games, in which he scored a total of 3,258 points, for a career scoring average of 21.0 points per game.

=== Croatia ===
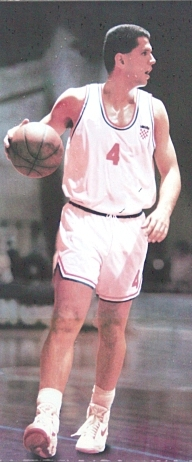
Petrović playing for Croatia

The 1992 Olympic Games in Barcelona, marked the first summer Olympics featuring the independent Croatia, and Petrović was the leader of the Croatian national basketball team at the Olympic basketball tournament. Losing only to the American Dream Team in the group stage, a strong and inspired Croatian team emerged victorious from the Semifinals against the revamped post-Soviet team, thanks to clutch free throws executed by Petrović, and faced off against the Americans for the gold. Urged on by Petrović's competitiveness and confidence, the Croatians fared well in the first ten minutes of the game, taking a 25–23 lead on a Franjo Arapović dunk and the subsequent made free throw. As the game progressed, however, the now-legendary team composed of NBA stars proved too tough for Croatia: the Americans won 117–85, sending Petrović, the game's leading scorer with 24 points, and his teammates, home with silver medals.

In the period during which Petrović played for the senior Croatian national team (1992–1993), he appeared in 40 games and scored a total of 1,002 points, for a career scoring average of 25.1 points per game. His highest single-game point tally came against Estonia, on 31 May 1993 (48 points). Counting the senior national team games that he played in with both Yugoslavia's and Croatia's national teams, Petrović scored a total of 4,260 points in 195 games played, for a career scoring average of 21.8 points per game.

== Death and legacy ==
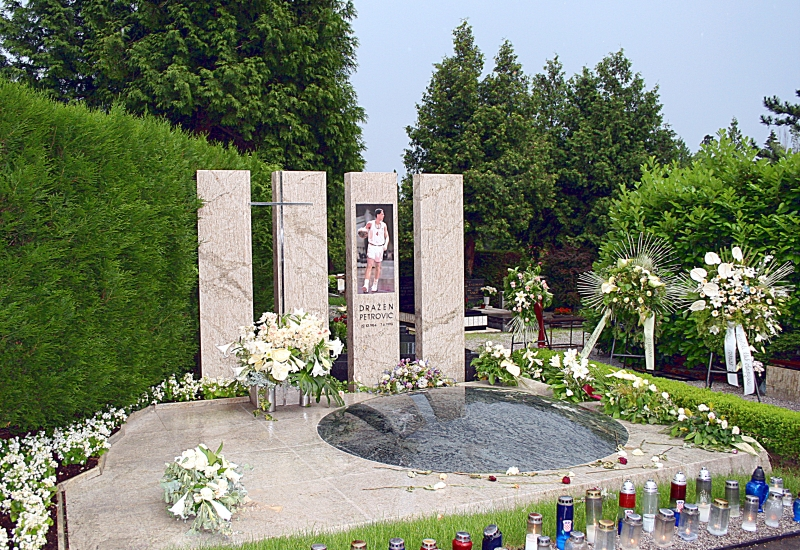
The grave of Petrović at Mirogoj in Zagreb

In the summer of 1993, after his best NBA season and the Nets' first-round elimination by the Cleveland Cavaliers, Petrović traveled to Wrocław, where the Croatian national team was playing a qualification tournament for the 1993 EuroBasket. He was contemplating departure from the Nets, disappointed with the fact that the Nets had not yet extended his contract. He told American reporters that the lack of recognition in the league made him also consider leaving the NBA completely and playing club basketball in Greece. There were at least two Greek clubs ready to offer Petrović three-year contracts worth US$7.5 million net. Petrović decided to skip the connection flight back to Zagreb from Frankfurt and instead drive to Zagreb with a woman he was romantically involved with at the time. He had met her only a few weeks prior after a game at the Meadowlands Arena.

Petrović died in a traffic accident at about 5:20 p.m. on 7 June 1993. On the rain-drenched Autobahn 9, he was a passenger in a Volkswagen Golf Mk2 registered "M-YE 7782" that was cut off by a semi-truck at Denkendorf near Ingolstadt in the German state of Bavaria. According to the report of the Ingolstadt police, that afternoon, a truck broke through the Autobahn median; the driver was trying to avoid a collision with a personal vehicle in his own lane and lost control of the truck, crashing through the median barrier and finally coming to a stop and blocking all three lanes of traffic going in the opposite direction. Seconds later, the Golf crashed into the truck, ejecting a sleeping Petrović from the passenger seat.

According to the autopsy report, Petrović died of severe head injuries on impact. The driver, Klara Szalantzy, a Hungarian model and basketball player with whom Petrović was romantically involved, and Hilal Edebal, a Turkish basketball player, sustained serious injuries. Visibility on the road was very poor and neither Petrović nor Edebal wore their seatbelts. According to Edebal, who incurred severe memory loss as a result of the accident and would never play basketball again, Szalantzy was driving 180 kilometres per hour (110 mph), which was legal on the Autobahn. Szalantzy would return to modeling and basketball not long after.

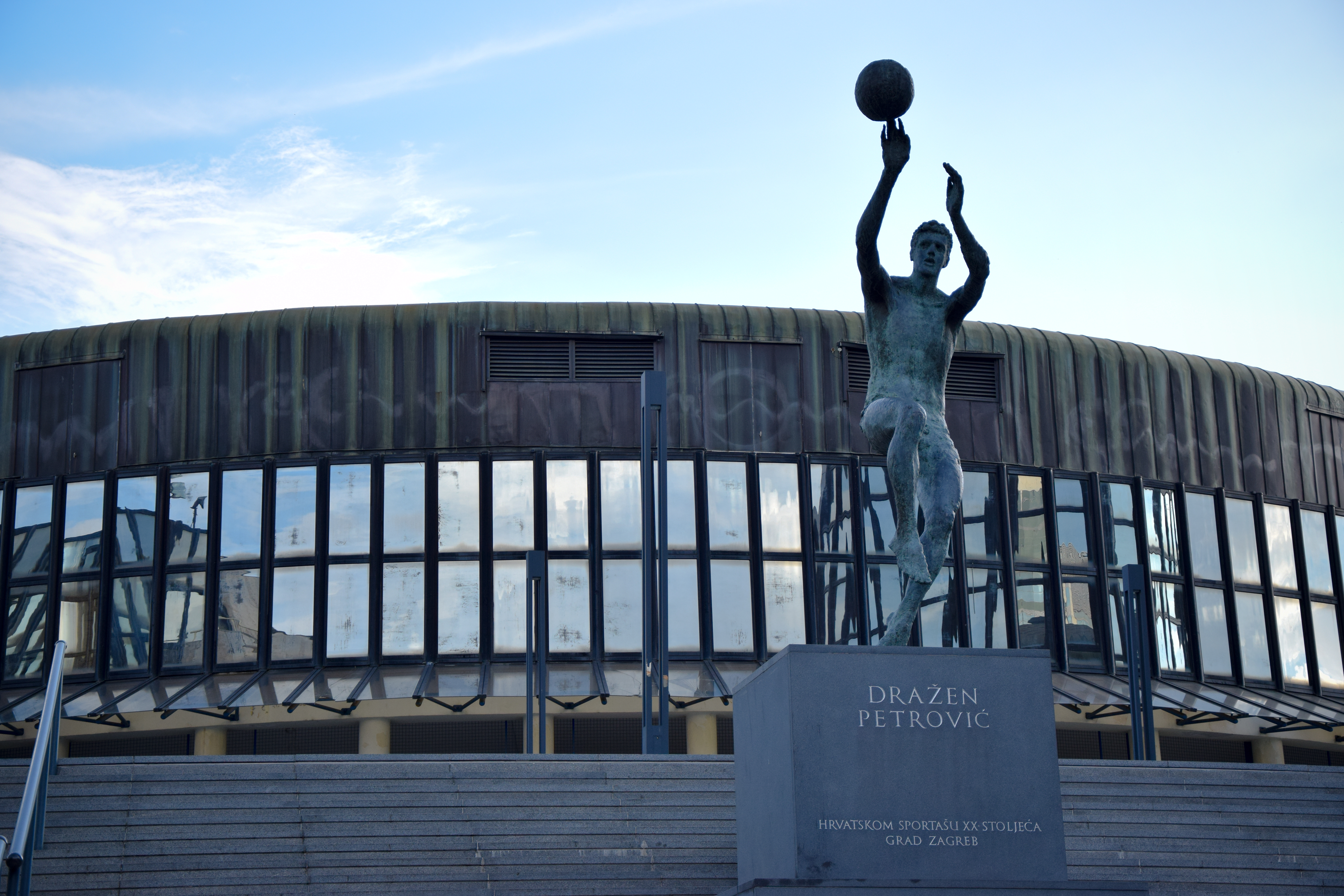
Statue of Petrović outside Dražen Petrović Basketball Hall

Petrović was buried on June 12, 1993, with a Catholic funeral Mass celebrated by Auxiliary Bishop Marko Culej of Zagreb. Petrović's tomb at Mirogoj Cemetery instantly became a sanctuary for his compatriots. The Cibona stadium was renamed the Dražen Petrović Basketball Hall on 4 October 1993, and the city of Zagreb dedicated a square in his name, which was later followed by Šibenik and Vukovar, while Petrinja dedicated a street to him. Before Game 1 of the 1993 NBA Finals, the NBA held a moment of silence for Petrović, whose death occurred two days before the event began. The Nets retired his number 3 jersey on 11 November 1993. On June 4, 1994, Diego Maradona, the Argentine football star who also had Croatian roots, paid tribute to Dražen Petrović by placing his Argentina jersey on the basketball star's grave in Zagreb. After 1994, the MVP award at the McDonald's Championship bore the name Dražen Petrović Trophy, and the Croatian Olympic Committee's award for young athletes was named for him in 2006. On 29 April 1995, a statue commemorating Petrović's significance to the world of sports was erected in front of the Olympic Museum in Lausanne, Switzerland, thus making him only the second athlete to receive this honor. On 9 July 2001, having defeated Patrick Rafter to win the men's singles title at Wimbledon, Croatian tennis player Goran Ivanišević dedicated the win to Petrović; Ivanišević wore Petrović's Nets jersey amidst the 100,000 strong crowd celebrating his victory in Split. Petrović was inducted posthumously into the Basketball Hall of Fame in 2002. In 2006, the 13th anniversary of Petrović's death was marked with the opening of the Dražen Petrović Memorial Center in Zagreb, dedicated to his life and achievements, with ten themed galleries of multimedia content outlining his entire career and a four-meter-high (13 ft) statue of Dražen in shooting position in front of it. Petrović was enshrined in the FIBA Hall of Fame in 2007.

The 2010 documentary, Once Brothers (part of the ESPN 30 for 30 series), portrays the achievements of the Yugoslavia national basketball team in the late 1980s and early 1990s, and how the Yugoslav Wars tore the team apart. It explores Petrović's broken friendship with Serbian/Yugoslav player Vlade Divac. In 2011, a statue of him as a little boy sitting on a bench with a ball was unveiled in Šibenik, and his old room was renovated the way it looked when he was young, as a first part of opening a Memorial Center in his hometown. During the 2012 Three Point Shootout, New Jersey Nets guard Anthony Morrow wore Petrović's jersey in the latter's honor. In 2015, Australian writer Todd Spehr released a 470-page biography on Petrović, titled Dražen: The Remarkable Life & Legacy of the Mozart of Basketball. At the urging of the Petrovic family, Spehr's book was released in the Croatian language in 2016 at the Petrovic Museum, and is considered the definitive work on his life. On 3 June 2015, Croatian basketball journalists Marjan Crnogaj and Vlado Radicevic released a 487-page biography, the global paperback edition of which was released on 14 October 2017. In 2024, the biographical film Dražen was released.

=== Reactions ===
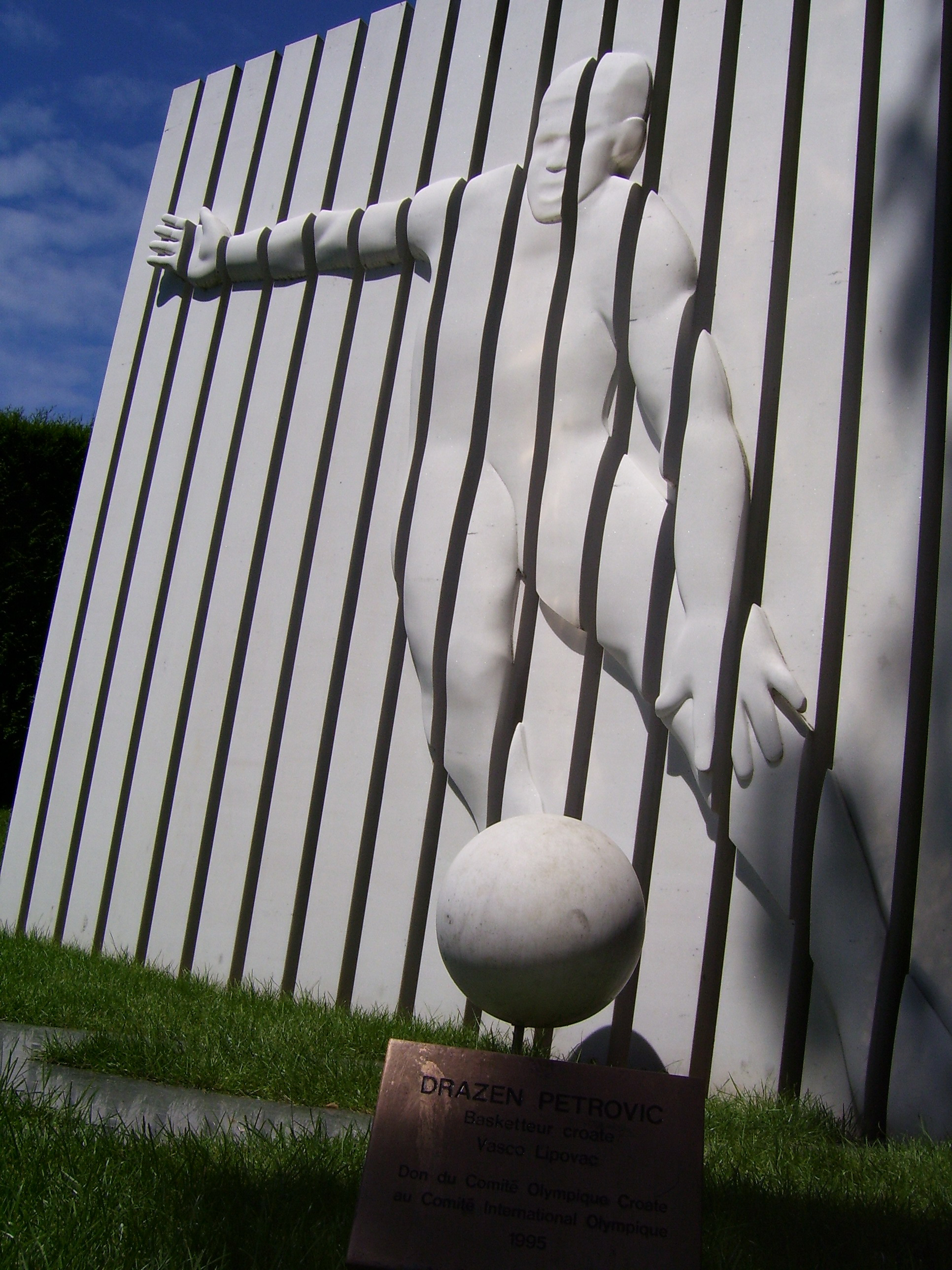
Monument of Petrović in Lausanne created by Vasko Lipovac

"It's hard for you to imagine here in America, because you have so many great players, but we are a country of four million; without him, basketball takes three steps back."

— Aleksandar "Aco" Petrović

"You know, there is a saying that we have about JFK, John F. Kennedy – 'You know, Johnny, we never got to know you.' And I kind of feel that way about Dražen. I felt that the whole year that I was with him went by too fast and I really never got to know him the way I would have liked to."

— Chuck Daly

"Dražen and I were very good friends. I was one of those people who welcomed him to Portland when he came from Europe. We talked about his family a lot in his restaurant, and he enjoyed his friends and he enjoyed the game of basketball. I really respect him because he worked very, very hard. Each and every day in practice he would be the first guy to come and the last guy to leave the gym. So anybody with that kind of dedication...you have to have a lot of respect for him."

— Clyde Drexler

"Dražen Petrović was an extraordinary young man, and a true pioneer in the global sports of basketball. I know that a lasting part of his athletic legacy will be that he paved the way for other international players to compete successfully in the NBA. His contributions to the sport of basketball were enormous. We are all proud of the fact we knew him."

— David Stern

"It was a thrill to play against Dražen. Every time we competed, he competed with an aggressive attitude. He wasn't nervous; he came at me as hard as I came at him. So we've had some great battles in the past and unfortunately, they were short battles."

— Michael Jordan

== Accomplishments and awards ==
=== Club competitions ===
European Champions Cup

- Champion: 1985, 1986

European Cup Winners' Cup

- Champion: 1987, 1989

Yugoslavian Championship

- Champion: 1985

Yugoslavian Cup

- Winner: 1985, 1986, 1988

Spanish Cup

- Winner: 1989

NBA Finals

- Runner-up: 1990

Korać Cup

- Runner-up: 1982, 1983, 1988

Spanish Championship

- Runner-up: 1989

Personal

- Yugoslav First League: most points scored by an individual, in a league game (112).
- Spanish ACB League: most points scored by an individual, in a final series game (42).
- Spanish ACB League: most 3-point field goals made by an individual, in a final series game (8).
- NBA: second highest 3-point field goal percentage (.444) in 1991–92.
- NBA: fourth highest field goal percentage among guards (.508) in 1991–92.
- NBA: second highest 3-point field goal percentage (.449) 1992–93.
- NBA: second highest field goal percentage among guards (.518) 1992–93.
- NBA: third best career 3-point field goal percentage (.437).

=== National teams ===
Summer Olympics

- Silver: 1988, 1992
- Bronze: 1984

FIBA World Championship

- Gold: 1990
- Bronze: 1986

FIBA EuroBasket

- Gold: 1989
- Bronze: 1987

Summer Universiade

- Gold: 1987
- Silver: 1983

Balkan Championship for Junior Men

- Gold: 1982
- Bronze: 1982

Balkan Championship for Cadets

- Gold: 1981

Balkan Championship

- Silver: 1984

FIBA Europe Under-18 Championship

- Silver: 1982

Personal

- Balkan Championship for Junior Men Best Player: 1982
- FIBA World Cup MVP: 1986
- FIBA EuroBasket MVP: 1989

== Dražen Petrović Memorial Center ==
A museum named "The Dražen Petrović Memorial Center" was founded in his honor, and constitutes a co-operative effort led by the Dražen Petrović Foundation in conjunction with the Croatian government, the city of Zagreb and the Croatian Museum of Sports. The memorial center idea originated from Petrović's parents, Biserka and Jole Petrovic, and was supported with the contributions of Croatian architects Andrija Rusan and Niksa Bilic. All of the articles presented in the center have been collected and categorized by the Croatian Museum of Sports. The organization and operations of the center have been provided by the Dražen Petrović Foundation, which is led by Petrović's family. The Center contains his No. 3 New Jersey Nets jersey and the watch that stopped when he died in a car crash. The center features 1,000 memorabilia items and a video of his basketball highlights.

The official opening of the museum was held on 7 June 2006, while the official opening of the center to the public began at the end of December 2006. The square on which the center is operated upon has been renamed to Dražen Petrović Square in his honor. In 2013, former NBA MVP Derrick Rose visited the museum.

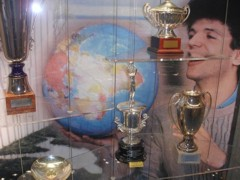

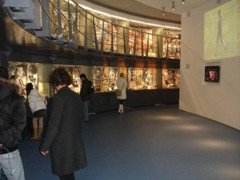

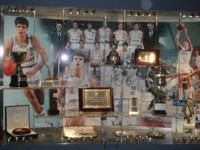

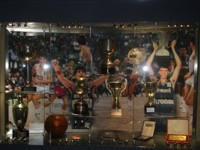

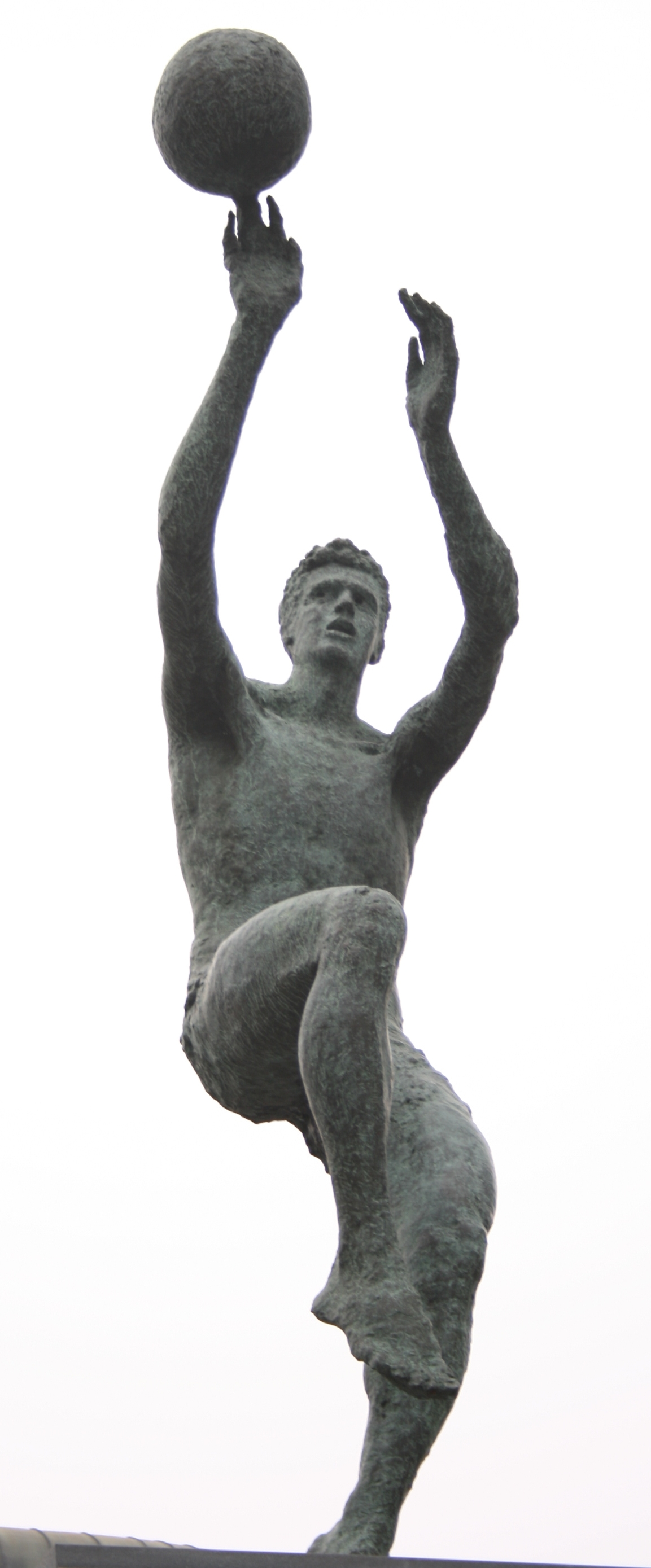

== See also ==
- List of National Basketball Association career 3-point field goal percentage leaders
- List of basketball players who died during their careers
- List of basketball players who have scored 100 points in a single game
- Yugoslav First Federal Basketball League career stats leaders

== Sources ==
- Freeman, Mike (9 June 1993). "Details Emerge, but Petrovic's Death Still Baffles". The New York Times.
- Huber, Jim (12 January 2006). "Drazen Petrovic". Inside the NBA. Archived from the original on 4 November 2021.
- Hawkesworth, Celia (2007). Zagreb: a cultural and literary history. Signal Books.
- Spehr, Todd (2016). The Mozart of Basketball: The Remarkable Life and Legacy of Drazen Petrovic. Sports. ISBN 978-1613219171.

Awards
Preceded by Šaban Trstena	The Best Athlete of Yugoslavia; 1985	Succeeded by Veselin Vujović
Preceded by Jure Franko	Yugoslav Sportsman of the Year; 1985	Succeeded by Rok Petrovič
