= 1988–89 Cleveland Cavaliers season =

NBA professional basketball team season

- Head coach: Lenny Wilkens
- General manager: Wayne Embry
- Arena: Richfield Coliseum

Results
- Record: 57–25 (.695)
- Place: Division: 2nd (Central); Conference: 3rd (Eastern)
- Playoff finish: First round (lost to Bulls 2–3)
- Stats at Basketball Reference

Local media
- Television: WOIO (Joe Tait, Jim Chones)
- Radio: WRMR (Joe Tait, Jim Johnson)

The 1988–89 Cleveland Cavaliers season was the 19th season for the Cleveland Cavaliers in the National Basketball Association.

== Season summary ==
=== Off-season ===
During the off-season, the team signed free agent Tree Rollins, and acquired Darnell Valentine from the Miami Heat expansion team.

=== Regular season ===
The Cavaliers started the regular season by defeating the expansion Charlotte Hornets on the road, 133–93 at the Charlotte Coliseum on November 4, 1988; it was the Hornets' first game in franchise history. The Cavaliers won 11 of their first 14 games of the season, posted an 11-game winning streak between December and January, which led to a successful 24–5 start, and later on held a 35–11 record at the All-Star break. The Cavaliers posted a six-game winning streak between February and March, and finished in second place in the Central Division with a franchise-best 57–25 record, earning the third seed in the Eastern Conference; their record was tied for second-best in the NBA along with the Los Angeles Lakers during the regular season.

Brad Daugherty averaged 18.9 points, 9.2 rebounds and 3.7 assists per game, while Mark Price averaged 18.9 points, 8.4 assists and 1.5 steals per game, led the Cavaliers with 93 three-point field goals, and was named to the All-NBA Third Team. In addition, Ron Harper contributed 18.6 points, 5.0 rebounds, 5.3 assists and 2.3 steals per game, while Larry Nance provided the team with 17.2 points, 8.0 rebounds and 2.8 blocks per game, and was named to the NBA All-Defensive First Team, and sixth man Hot Rod Williams averaged 11.6 points, 5.8 rebounds and 1.6 blocks per game off the bench. Meanwhile, Mike Sanders provided with 9.3 points per game, Craig Ehlo contributed 7.4 points, 3.2 assists and 1.3 steals per game, and Valentine averaged 4.8 points and 2.3 assists per game.

During the NBA All-Star weekend at the Houston Astrodome in Houston, Texas, Price, Daugherty and Nance were all selected for the 1989 NBA All-Star Game, as members of the Eastern Conference All-Star team, while head coach Lenny Wilkens was selected to coach the Eastern Conference; it was Price's first ever All-Star appearance. Despite a stellar season, Harper was not selected for the NBA All-Star Game. In addition, Harper participated in the NBA Slam Dunk Contest for the second time; Nance was also selected for the Slam Dunk Contest, but did not participate. Price finished in tenth place in Most Valuable Player voting, while Daugherty finished tied in eleventh place, and Nance finished tied in 13th place; Williams finished tied in sixth place in Sixth Man of the Year voting, and Wilkens finished in third place in Coach of the Year voting.

The Cavaliers finished fifth in the NBA in home-game attendance, with an attendance of 721,426 at the Coliseum at Richfield during the regular season.

=== NBA playoffs ===
In the Eastern Conference First Round of the 1989 NBA playoffs, the Cavaliers faced off against the 6th–seeded Chicago Bulls, who were led by All-Star guard Michael Jordan, and second-year stars, Scottie Pippen and Horace Grant. The Bulls took a 2–1 series lead, but the Cavaliers managed to win Game 4 on the road in overtime, 108–105 at the Chicago Stadium to even the series. However, the Cavaliers lost Game 5 to the Bulls at home, 101–100 at the Coliseum at Richfield, in which Jordan hit a memorable series-clinching shot over Ehlo at the buzzer; the Cavaliers lost the series to the Bulls in five hard-fought games.

=== Aftermath ===
Following the season, Sanders signed as a free agent with the Indiana Pacers, and Valentine was released to free agency.

== Draft picks ==
Round	Pick	Player	Position	Nationality	School/Club team
1	22	Randolph Keys	Forward	United States	Southern Miss
3	64	Winston Bennett	Forward	United States	Kentucky

- 1st round pick (#14) traded to Phoenix in Larry Nance deal. Used to draft Dan Majerle.
- 2nd round pick (#38) traded to Phoenix in Larry Nance deal. Used to draft Dean Garrett.

== Roster ==
1988–89 Cleveland Cavaliers roster
Players

Pos.	No.	Player	Height	Weight	DOB	From
C	43	Brad Daugherty	7 ft 0 in (2.13 m)	245 lb (111 kg)	1965–10–19	North Carolina
C	24	Chris Dudley	6 ft 11 in (2.11 m)	235 lb (107 kg)	1965–02–22	Yale
G/F	3	Craig Ehlo	6 ft 6 in (1.98 m)	180 lb (82 kg)	1961–08–11	Washington State
G	4	Ron Harper	6 ft 6 in (1.98 m)	185 lb (84 kg)	1964–01–20	Miami (OH)
F	35	Phil Hubbard	6 ft 8 in (2.03 m)	215 lb (98 kg)	1956–12–13	Michigan
F	31	Randolph Keys	6 ft 7 in (2.01 m)	195 lb (88 kg)	1966–04–19	Southern Miss
F	22	Larry Nance	6 ft 10 in (2.08 m)	205 lb (93 kg)	1959–02–12	Clemson
G	25	Mark Price	6 ft 0 in (1.83 m)	170 lb (77 kg)	1964–02–15	Georgia Tech
C	30	Tree Rollins	7 ft 1 in (2.16 m)	235 lb (107 kg)	1955–06–16	Clemson
F	11	Mike Sanders	6 ft 6 in (1.98 m)	210 lb (95 kg)	1960–05–07	UCLA
G	1	Darnell Valentine	6 ft 1 in (1.85 m)	183 lb (83 kg)	1959–02–03	Kansas
F/C	18	Hot Rod Williams	6 ft 11 in (2.11 m)	215 lb (98 kg)	1962–08–09	Tulane

Coaches
Head coach
- Lenny Wilkens
Assistant(s)
- Dick Helm
- Brian Winters

Legend
- (DP) Unsigned draft pick
- (FA) Free agent
- (S) Suspended
- Injured

Roster
Updated: August 2, 1988

== Regular season ==
=== Season standings ===
Central Division	W	L	PCT	GB	Home	Road	Div
y-Detroit Pistons	63	19	.768	–	37–4	26–15	20–10
x-Cleveland Cavaliers	57	25	.695	6	37–4	20–21	19–11
x-Atlanta Hawks	52	30	.634	11	33–8	19–22	20–10
x-Milwaukee Bucks	49	33	.598	14	31–10	18–23	11–19
x-Chicago Bulls	47	35	.573	16	30–11	17–24	12–18
Indiana Pacers	28	54	.341	35	20–21	8–33	8–22

#	Eastern Conference				
#	Team	W	L	PCT	GB
1	z-Detroit Pistons	63	19	.768	–
2	y-New York Knicks	52	30	.634	11
3	x-Cleveland Cavaliers	57	25	.695	6
4	x-Atlanta Hawks	52	30	.634	11
5	x-Milwaukee Bucks	49	33	.598	14
6	x-Chicago Bulls	47	35	.573	16
7	x-Philadelphia 76ers	46	36	.561	17
8	x-Boston Celtics	42	40	.512	21
9	Washington Bullets	40	42	.488	23
10	Indiana Pacers	28	54	.341	35
11	New Jersey Nets	26	56	.317	37
12	Charlotte Hornets	20	62	.244	43

Notes

- z, y – division champions
- x – clinched playoff spot

== Game log ==
1988–89 game log
Total: 57–25 (home: 37–4; road: 20–21)
November: 8–3 (home: 4–1; road: 4–2)

Game	Date	Team	Score	High points	High rebounds	High assists	Location Attendance	Record
1	November 4, 1988	@ Charlotte						
2	November 5, 1988	@ Indiana						
3	November 9, 1988	L.A. Clippers						
4	November 12, 1988	Indiana						
5	November 15, 1988; 8:00 pm EST	Atlanta	L 95–97	Daugherty (22)	Williams (11)	Price (10)	Richfield Coliseum; 15,684	4–1
6	November 18, 1988	@ New Jersey						
7	November 19, 1988	Milwaukee						
8	November 22, 1988	@ Boston (at Hartford, CT)						
9	November 23, 1988	@ Philadelphia						
10	November 26, 1988	@ New York						
11	November 27, 1988	Miami						

December: 12–2 (home: 8–1; road: 4–1)

Game	Date	Team	Score	High points	High rebounds	High assists	Location Attendance	Record
12	December 1, 1988	@ Milwaukee						
13	December 2, 1988	Boston						
14	December 4, 1988	Denver						
15	December 6, 1988	@ Houston						
16	December 8, 1988	@ San Antonio						
17	December 10, 1988	@ Dallas						
18	December 13, 1988	L.A. Lakers						
19	December 15, 1988	Detroit						
20	December 17, 1988; 7:30 pm EST	Atlanta	W 120–94	Price (23)	Daugherty, Harper (9)	Price (8)	Richfield Coliseum; 18,815	15–5
21	December 20, 1988	Utah						
22	December 21, 1988	@ Boston						
23	December 23, 1988	Seattle						
24	December 27, 1988	@ Chicago						
25	December 28, 1988	Charlotte						
26	December 30, 1988	Washington						

January: 11–4 (home: 7–0; road: 4–4)

Game	Date	Team	Score	High points	High rebounds	High assists	Location Attendance	Record
27	January 3, 1989	Indiana						
28	January 5, 1989	Chicago						
29	January 7, 1989	New York						
30	January 9, 1989	@ Seattle						
31	January 11, 1989	@ Phoenix						
32	January 13, 1989	@ L.A. Lakers						
33	January 14, 1989	@ Denver						
34	January 16, 1989	Phoenix						
35	January 19, 1989	@ Indiana						
36	January 21, 1989	New Jersey						
37	January 23, 1989	Golden State						
38	January 24, 1989; 7:30 pm EST	@ Atlanta	L 105–121	Nance (28)	Daugherty (9)	Price (9)	The Omni; 16,371	30–8
39	January 27, 1989	@ Detroit						
40	January 29, 1989	@ Washington (at Baltimore, MD)						
41	January 31, 1989	Philadelphia						

February: 10–3 (home: 8–0; road: 2–3)

Game	Date	Team	Score	High points	High rebounds	High assists	Location Attendance	Record
42	February 2, 1989	@ New York						
43	February 3, 1989	Sacramento						
44	February 5, 1989	@ Charlotte						
45	February 7, 1989	@ Milwaukee						
46	February 9, 1989	Indiana						
All-Star Break
47	February 14, 1989	@ Miami						
48	February 15, 1989	New York						
49	February 17, 1989; 8:00 pm EST	@ Atlanta	L 100–108	Price (29)	Daugherty (13)	Harper (5)	The Omni; 16,371	37–12
50	February 18, 1989	Philadelphia						
51	February 20, 1989	Houston						
52	February 22, 1989	New Jersey						
53	February 24, 1989	Portland						
54	February 28, 1989	Detroit						

March: 9–8 (home: 5–1; road: 4–7)

Game	Date	Team	Score	High points	High rebounds	High assists	Location Attendance	Record
55	March 2, 1989	San Antonio						
56	March 3, 1989	@ Detroit						
57	March 5, 1989	Milwaukee						
58	March 7, 1989	@ Sacramento						
59	March 9, 1989	@ Golden State						
60	March 10, 1989	@ L.A. Clippers						
61	March 12, 1989	@ Portland						
62	March 13, 1989	@ Utah						
63	March 15, 1989	Chicago						
64	March 19, 1989	@ New Jersey						
65	March 20, 1989	Washington						
66	March 22, 1989	@ Philadelphia						
67	March 23, 1989	Milwaukee						
68	March 25, 1989	@ Milwaukee						
69	March 27, 1989	@ Indiana						
70	March 28, 1989	Dallas						
71	March 31, 1989	@ Chicago						

April: 6–5 (home: 5–1; road: 1–4)

Game	Date	Team	Score	High points	High rebounds	High assists	Location Attendance	Record
72	April 2, 1989	Boston						
73	April 4, 1989; 7:30 pm EDT	Atlanta	W 105–91	Harper (32)	Daugherty (17)	Price (13)	Richfield Coliseum; 19,322	53–20
74	April 7, 1989	@ Washington						
75	April 9, 1989	Charlotte						
76	April 11, 1989	Philadelphia						
77	April 12, 1989	@ Detroit						
78	April 14, 1989	@ Boston						
79	April 16, 1989	Chicago						
80	April 18, 1989	Detroit						
81	April 21, 1989; 7:30 pm EDT	@ Atlanta	L 89–92	Harper (18)	Harper, Rollins (8)	Ehlo (8)	The Omni; 16,371	56–25
82	April 23, 1989	@ Chicago						

1988–89 schedule

== Playoffs ==
1989 playoff game log
Eastern Conference First Round: 2–3 (home: 1–2; road: 1–1)

Game	Date	Team	Score	High points	High rebounds	High assists	Location Attendance	Series
1	April 28	Chicago	L 88–95	Craig Ehlo (19)	Brad Daugherty (7)	Darnell Valentine (6)	Richfield Coliseum; 19,312	0–1
2	April 30	Chicago	W 96–88	Ron Harper (31)	Ron Harper (11)	Larry Nance (5)	Richfield Coliseum; 20,273	1–1
3	May 3	@ Chicago	L 94–101	Hot Rod Williams (22)	Hot Rod Williams (11)	Darnell Valentine (8)	Chicago Stadium; 17,721	1–2
4	May 5	@ Chicago	W 108–105 (OT)	Larry Nance (27)	Brad Daugherty (17)	Mark Price (7)	Chicago Stadium; 18,264	2–2
5	May 7	Chicago	L 100–101	Craig Ehlo (24)	Brad Daugherty (11)	Mark Price (7)	Richfield Coliseum; 20,273	2–3

1989 schedule

== Player stats ==
Legend
GP	Games played	GS	Games started	MPG	Minutes per game
FG%	Field-goal percentage	3P%	3-point field-goal percentage	FT%	Free-throw percentage
RPG	Rebounds per game	APG	Assists per game	SPG	Steals per game
BPG	Blocks per game	PPG	Points per game

=== Regular season ===
Player	GP	GS	MPG	FG%	3FG%	FT%	RPG	APG	SPG	BPG	PPG
Mark Price	75	74	36.4	52.6	44.1	90.1	3.0	8.4	1.5	0.1	18.9
Brad Daugherty	78	78	36.2	53.8	33.3	73.7	9.2	3.7	0.8	0.5	18.9
Ron Harper	82	82	34.8	51.1	25.0	75.1	5.0	5.3	2.3	0.9	18.6
Larry Nance	73	72	34.6	53.9	0.0	79.9	8.0	2.2	0.8	2.8	17.2
Hot Rod Williams	82	10	25.9	50.9	25.0	74.8	5.8	1.3	0.9	1.6	11.6
Mike Sanders	82	82	25.6	45.3	30.0	71.9	3.7	1.6	1.1	0.4	9.3
Craig Ehlo	82	4	22.8	47.5	39.0	60.7	3.6	3.2	1.3	0.2	7.4
Darnell Valentine	77	4	14.1	42.6	21.4	81.3	1.3	2.3	0.7	0.1	4.8
Randolph Keys	42	0	7.9	43.0	10.0	69.0	1.3	0.5	0.3	0.1	4.0
Chris Dudley	61	2	8.9	43.5	0.0	36.4	2.6	0.3	0.1	0.4	3.0
Phil Hubbard	31	0	6.2	44.4	0.0	68.0	1.3	0.4	0.2	0.0	2.4
Tree Rollins	60	2	9.7	44.9	0.0	63.2	2.3	0.3	0.2	0.6	2.3

=== Playoffs ===
Player	GP	GS	MPG	FG%	3FG%	FT%	RPG	APG	SPG	BPG	PPG
Ron Harper	5	5	37.8	56.5	0.0	76.9	4.2	4.0	2.2	0.8	19.6
Larry Nance	5	5	39.0	55.1	0.0	65.6	7.8	3.2	0.6	2.4	19.4
Mark Price	4	4	39.5	38.6	37.5	93.3	3.3	5.5	0.8	0.0	16.0
Craig Ehlo	4	1	24.3	43.6	38.5	81.8	1.5	3.3	0.8	0.3	12.0
Brad Daugherty	5	5	33.4	36.2	0.0	60.0	9.2	2.4	1.2	1.0	11.0
Hot Rod Williams	5	2	32.2	46.7	0.0	72.2	6.8	2.0	0.4	1.4	11.0
Mike Sanders	5	3	17.4	50.0	0.0	60.0	3.2	0.8	0.4	0.2	6.6
Darnell Valentine	5	0	16.0	35.0	0.0	87.5	1.4	3.2	1.0	0.0	4.2
Tree Rollins	5	0	14.8	75.0	0.0	60.0	3.2	0.2	0.6	1.4	3.0
Randolph Keys	1	0	12.0	0.0	0.0	0.0	3.0	1.0	0.0	0.0	0.0
Chris Dudley	1	0	4.0	0.0	0.0	0.0	0.0	0.0	0.0	0.0	0.0
Phil Hubbard	1	0	1.0	0.0	0.0	0.0	0.0	0.0	0.0	0.0	0.0

Player statistics citation:

== Awards and records ==
=== Awards ===
- Mark Price, All-NBA Third Team
- Larry Nance, NBA All-Defensive First Team
