= 1988–89 Washington Bullets season =

NBA professional basketball team season

- Head coach: Wes Unseld
- General manager: Bob Ferry
- Arena: Capital Centre (38 games); Baltimore Arena (3 games)

Results
- Record: 40–42 (.488)
- Place: Division: 4th (Atlantic); Conference: 9th (Eastern)
- Playoff finish: Did not qualify
- Stats at Basketball Reference

Local media
- Television: WDCA; Home Team Sports (Mel Proctor, Phil Chenier)
- Radio: WTOP (Charlie Slowes)

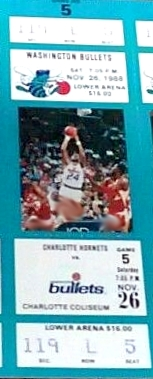
A ticket for a November 1988 game between the Bullets and the Charlotte Hornets.

The 1988–89 Washington Bullets season was the 28th season for the Washington Bullets in the National Basketball Association, and their 16th season in Washington, D.C.

== Season summary ==
=== Off-season ===
The Bullets had the twelfth overall pick in the 1988 NBA draft, and selected small forward Harvey Grant from the University of Oklahoma; the team also selected shooting guard Ledell Eackles from the University of New Orleans with the 36th overall pick. During the off-season, the Bullets acquired Dave Feitl from the Golden State Warriors.

=== Regular season ===
Under Wes Unseld's first full season as head coach, and with the addition of Grant and Eackles, the Bullets struggled posting a seven-game losing streak in December, which led to a 4–14 start to the regular season, and later on held a 17–28 record at the All-Star break. However, the team played above .500 in winning percentage for the remainder of the season, winning 11 of their 16 games in March. The Bullets finished in fourth place in the Atlantic Division with a 40–42 record, which was two more wins than the previous season; however, the team failed to qualify for the NBA playoffs, finishing just two games behind the 8th–seeded Boston Celtics.

Jeff Malone led the Bullets in scoring averaging 21.7 points per game, while Bernard King averaged 20.7 points per game, and sixth man Hot Plate Williams provided the team with 13.7 points, 7.0 rebounds, 4.3 assists and 1.7 steals per game off the bench. In addition, Eackles contributed 11.5 points per game, while Terry Catledge provided with 10.4 points and 7.2 rebounds per game, and Darrell Walker contributed 9.0 points, 6.4 rebounds, 6.3 assists and 2.0 steals per game. Meanwhile, Mark Alarie averaged 6.7 points and 3.4 rebounds per game, Steve Colter provided with 6.7 points and 2.8 assists per game, Grant contributed 5.6 points per game, Feitl provided with 5.0 points and 3.5 rebounds per game, and defensive center Charles Jones averaged 2.6 points, 4.8 rebounds and 1.4 blocks per game, but only played 53 games due to a knee injury.

Williams finished in fourth place in Sixth Man of the Year voting, while Unseld finished in fifth place in Coach of the Year voting. The Bullets finished last in the NBA in home-game attendance, with an attendance of 253,980 at the Capital Centre during the regular season, which was 25th in the league.

=== Aftermath ===
Following the season, Catledge was left unprotected in the 1989 NBA expansion draft, where he was selected by the Orlando Magic expansion team, and Feitl was released to free agency.

== Draft picks ==
Round	Pick	Player	Position	Nationality	College
1	12	Harvey Grant	SF/PF	United States	Oklahoma
2	36	Ledell Eackles	SG/SF	United States	New Orleans
3	60	Ed Davender		United States	Kentucky

== Roster ==
1988–89 Washington Bullets roster
Players

Pos.	No.	Player	Height	Weight	DOB	From
F	31	Mark Alarie	6 ft 8 in (2.03 m)	217 lb (98 kg)	1963–12–11	Duke
F	33	Terry Catledge	6 ft 8 in (2.03 m)	220 lb (100 kg)	1963–08–22	South Alabama
G	20	Steve Colter	6 ft 3 in (1.91 m)	165 lb (75 kg)	1962–07–24	New Mexico State
G	21	Ledell Eackles	6 ft 5 in (1.96 m)	220 lb (100 kg)	1966–11–24	LSU New Orleans
C	22	Dave Feitl	6 ft 11 in (2.11 m)	235 lb (107 kg)	1962–06–08	UTEP
F	44	Harvey Grant	6 ft 8 in (2.03 m)	195 lb (88 kg)	1965–07–04	Oklahoma
C	23	Charles Jones	6 ft 9 in (2.06 m)	215 lb (98 kg)	1957–04–03	Albany State
F	51	Charles Jones	6 ft 8 in (2.03 m)	215 lb (98 kg)	1962–01–12	Louisville
F	30	Bernard King	6 ft 7 in (2.01 m)	205 lb (93 kg)	1956–12–04	Tennessee
G	24	Jeff Malone	6 ft 4 in (1.93 m)	205 lb (93 kg)	1961–06–28	Mississippi State
G	5	Darrell Walker	6 ft 4 in (1.93 m)	180 lb (82 kg)	1961–03–09	Arkansas
F	34	John Williams	6 ft 8 in (2.03 m)	235 lb (107 kg)	1966–10–26	LSU

Coaches
Head coach
- Wes Unseld
Assistant(s)
- Bill Blair
- Jeff Bzdelik

Legend
- (DP) Unsigned draft pick
- (FA) Free agent
- (S) Suspended
- Injured

== Regular season ==
=== Season standings ===
Atlantic Division	W	L	PCT	GB	Home	Road	Div
y-New York Knicks	52	30	.634	–	35–6	17–24	18–12
x-Philadelphia 76ers	46	36	.561	6	30–11	16–25	19–11
x-Boston Celtics	42	40	.512	10	32–9	10–31	19–11
Washington Bullets	40	42	.488	12	30–11	10–31	17–13
New Jersey Nets	26	56	.317	26	17–24	9–32	9–21
Charlotte Hornets	20	62	.244	32	12–29	8–33	8–22

#	Eastern Conference				
#	Team	W	L	PCT	GB
1	z-Detroit Pistons	63	19	.768	–
2	y-New York Knicks	52	30	.634	11
3	x-Cleveland Cavaliers	57	25	.695	6
4	x-Atlanta Hawks	52	30	.634	11
5	x-Milwaukee Bucks	49	33	.598	14
6	x-Chicago Bulls	47	35	.573	16
7	x-Philadelphia 76ers	46	36	.561	17
8	x-Boston Celtics	42	40	.512	21
9	Washington Bullets	40	42	.488	23
10	Indiana Pacers	28	54	.341	35
11	New Jersey Nets	26	56	.317	37
12	Charlotte Hornets	20	62	.244	43

z - clinched division title
y - clinched division title
x - clinched playoff spot

== Game log ==
=== Regular season ===
1988–89 game log
Total: 40–42 (Home: 30–11; Road: 10–31)
November: 4–7 (home: 2–3; road: 2–4)

Game	Date	Team	Score	High points	High rebounds	High assists	Location Attendance	Record
1	November 5	Chicago	L 98–111				Capital Centre	0–1
2	November 8	@ New Jersey	L 101–109				Brendan Byrne Arena	0–2
3	November 9	New York	L 110–117				Capital Centre	0–3
4	November 11	Charlotte	W 96–87				Capital Centre	1–3
5	November 12	@ New York	L 101–111				Madison Square Garden	1–4
6	November 18	@ Boston	L 108–114				Boston Garden	1–5
7	November 19	Boston	W 108–104				Capital Centre	2–5
8	November 22	Philadelphia	L 103–130				Capital Centre	2–6
9	November 23	@ Milwaukee	L 102–124				Bradley Center	2–7
10	November 25	@ Indiana	W 106–101				Market Square Arena	3–7
11	November 26	@ Charlotte	W 120–113				Charlotte Coliseum	4–7

December: 4–11 (home: 3–2; road: 1–9)

Game	Date	Team	Score	High points	High rebounds	High assists	Location Attendance	Record
12	December 1	@ Atlanta	L 115–127				The Omni	4–8
13	December 2	Detroit	L 114–120				Capital Centre	4–9
14	December 4	@ L.A. Lakers	L 112–119 (OT)				The Forum	4–10
15	December 6	@ Phoenix	L 92–130				Arizona Veterans Memorial Coliseum	4–11
16	December 7	@ Utah	L 94–111				Salt Palace	4–12
17	December 9	@ Portland	L 90–93				Memorial Coliseum	4–13
18	December 10	@ Golden State	L 102–109				Oakland–Alameda County Coliseum Arena	4–14
19	December 13	Boston	W 115–105				Capital Centre	5–14
20	December 17	@ New York	L 102–117				Madison Square Garden	5–15
21	December 18	L.A. Lakers	W 115–110				Capital Centre	6–15
22	December 21	Utah	L 82–98				Capital Centre	6–16
23	December 25	@ Philadelphia	L 110–125				The Spectrum	6–17
24	December 26	@ New Jersey	W 120–108				Brendan Byrne Arena	7–17
25	December 29	Houston	W 126–109				Capital Centre	8–17
26	December 30	@ Cleveland	L 110–127				Richfield Coliseum	8–18

January: 8–6 (home: 8–3; road: 0–3)

Game	Date	Team	Score	High points	High rebounds	High assists	Location Attendance	Record
27	January 2	Phoenix	L 122–125				Capital Centre	8–19
28	January 4	Charlotte	W 109–86				Capital Centre	9–19
29	January 6	Milwaukee (at Baltimore, Maryland)	L 121–128 (2OT)				Baltimore Arena	9–20
30	January 7	@ Charlotte	L 104–107				Charlotte Coliseum	9–21
31	January 10	Denver	W 120–117				Capital Centre	10–21
32	January 12	Miami	W 106–100				Capital Centre	11–21
33	January 13	@ Detroit	L 103–119				The Palace of Auburn Hills	11–22
34	January 16	Atlanta	L 106–117				Capital Centre	11–23
35	January 19	San Antonio	W 115–112				Capital Centre	12–23
36	January 21	Philadelphia	W 107–105				Capital Centre	13–23
37	January 26	Indiana	W 126–106				Capital Centre	14–23
38	January 27	@ Chicago	L 106–117				Chicago Stadium	14–24
38	January 29	Cleveland (at Baltimore, Maryland)	W 122–117 (OT)				Baltimore Arena	15–24
40	January 31	Boston	W 110–103				Capital Centre	16–24

February: 6–7 (home: 3–1; road: 3–6)

Game	Date	Team	Score	High points	High rebounds	High assists	Location Attendance	Record
41	February 1	@ Philadelphia	L 110–114 (OT)				The Spectrum	16–25
42	February 3	@ Boston	L 108–117				Boston Garden	16–26
43	February 4	Milwaukee	L 102–113				Capital Centre	16–27
44	February 7	@ New York	L 105–117				Madison Square Garden	16–28
45	February 9	New Jersey	W 110–103				Capital Centre	17–28
46	February 14	@ Sacramento	W 107–99				ARCO Arena	18–28
45	February 15	@ Denver	L 106–117				Capital Centre	18–29
48	February 17	@ Seattle	L 112–126				Seattle Center Coliseum	18–30
49	February 18	@ L.A. Clippers	W 98–93				Los Angeles Memorial Sports Arena	19–30
50	February 21	L.A. Clippers	W 123–109				Capital Centre	20–30
51	February 24	New York (at Baltimore, Maryland)	W 130–127				Baltimore Arena	21–30
52	February 25	@ Dallas	L 93–127				Reunion Arena	21–31
53	February 27	@ Houston	W 104–98				Capital Centre	22–31

March: 11–6 (home: 9–0; road: 2–6)

Game	Date	Team	Score	High points	High rebounds	High assists	Location Attendance	Record
54	March 1	New Jersey	W 120–105				Capital Centre	23–31
55	March 4	Dallas	W 119–105				Capital Centre	24–31
56	March 5	Charlotte	W 114–101				Capital Centre	25–31
57	March 7	@ Milwaukee	L 101–121				Bradley Center	25–32
58	March 8	Atlanta	W 119–111				Capital Centre	26–32
59	March 10	Sacramento	W 114–97				Capital Centre	27–32
60	March 12	@ Detroit	L 104–110				The Palace of Auburn Hills	27–33
61	March 13	Seattle	W 106–101				Capital Centre	28–33
62	March 17	@ New Jersey	W 124–121 (OT)				Brendan Byrne Arena	29–33
63	March 18	Philadelphia	W 123–114				Capital Centre	30–33
64	March 20	@ Cleveland	L 97–103				Richfield Coliseum	30–34
65	March 22	@ Indiana	L 92–101				Market Square Arena	30–35
66	March 23	@ Charlotte	W 102–97				Charlotte Coliseum	31–35
67	March 25	Indiana	W 111–108 (OT)				Capital Centre	32–35
68	March 28	@ San Antonio	L 114–130				HemisFair Arena	32–36
69	March 29	@ Atlanta	L 102–120				The Omni	32–37
70	March 31	Portland	W 107–105				Capital Centre	33–37

April: 7–5 (home: 5–2; road: 2–3)

Game	Date	Team	Score	High points	High rebounds	High assists	Location Attendance	Record
71	April 2	Golden State	W 120–103				Capital Centre	34–37
72	April 4	New Jersey	W 104–96				Capital Centre	35–37
73	April 6	@ Miami	W 101–93				Miami Arena	36–37
74	April 7	Cleveland	W 107–96				Capital Centre	37–37
75	April 9	New York	L 92–94				Capital Centre	37–38
76	April 10	Detroit	L 100–124				Capital Centre	37–39
78	April 16	@ Detroit	L 98–104				The Palace of Auburn Hills	38–40
79	April 18	@ Boston	W 121–113				Boston Garden	39–40
80	April 20	Chicago	W 100–98				Capital Centre	40–40
81	April 21	@ Chicago	L 113–115				Chicago Stadium	40–41
82	April 23	@ Philadelphia	L 106–115				The Spectrum	40–42

1988–89 schedule

== See also ==
- 1988-89 NBA season
