= 1988–89 Portland Trail Blazers season =

NBA professional basketball team season

- Head coach: Mike Schuler (fired); Rick Adelman
- General manager: Jon Spoelstra
- Owner: Paul Allen
- Arena: Memorial Coliseum

Results
- Record: 39–43 (.476)
- Place: Division: 5th (Pacific); Conference: 8th (Western)
- Playoff finish: First round (lost to Lakers 0–3)
- Stats at Basketball Reference

Local media
- Television: KOIN
- Radio: KEX (Bill Schonely, Steve Jones)

The 1988–89 Portland Trail Blazers season was the 19th season for the Portland Trail Blazers in the National Basketball Association.

== Season summary ==
=== Off-season ===
The Trail Blazers had the 21st overall pick in the 1988 NBA draft, and selected power forward Mark Bryant out of Seton Hall University. During the off-season, the team signed free agents Danny Young and Adrian Branch.

=== Regular season ===
After a 25–22 start to the regular season, head coach Mike Schuler was fired in mid-February, and was replaced with assistant coach Rick Adelman on an interim basis; after the season, Adelman was made the team's head coach on a full-time basis. At mid-season, the Trail Blazers traded Kiki Vandeweghe to the New York Knicks in exchange for a future first-round draft pick. Before the trade, Vandeweghe averaged 13.9 points per game in 18 games. The team held a 25–21 record at the All-Star break, and played below .500 in winning percentage for the remainder of the season, which included two six-game losing streaks in February and March. The Trail Blazers finished in fifth place in the Pacific Division with a 39–43 record, earning the eighth seed in the Western Conference; the team qualified for the NBA playoffs for the seventh consecutive year.

Clyde Drexler averaged 27.2 points, 7.9 rebounds, 5.8 assists and 2.7 steals per game, while last season's Most Improved Player Kevin Duckworth averaged 18.1 points and 8.0 rebounds per game, and Terry Porter provided the team with 17.7 points, 9.5 assists and 1.8 steals per game. In addition, Jerome Kersey contributed 17.5 points, 8.3 rebounds and 1.8 steals per game, while Steve Johnson provided with 10.0 points and 5.0 rebounds per game, and Sam Bowie averaged 8.6 points and 5.3 rebounds per game, but only played just 20 games due to injury. Meanwhile, Branch contributed 7.4 points per game, while Young provided with 6.2 points and 2.6 assists per game, but only played just 48 games, Bryant averaged 5.0 points and 3.2 rebounds per game, and Caldwell Jones averaged 2.8 points, 4.2 rebounds and 1.2 blocks per game.

During the NBA All-Star weekend at the Houston Astrodome in Houston, Texas, Drexler and Duckworth were both selected for the 1989 NBA All-Star Game, as members of the Western Conference All-Star team; it was Duckworth's first ever All-Star appearance. In addition, Drexler and Kersey both participated in the NBA Slam Dunk Contest; it was the fifth appearance for Drexler, and the fourth appearance for Kersey.

The Trail Blazers finished 17th in the NBA in home-game attendance, with an attendance of 527,008 at the Memorial Coliseum during the regular season.

=== NBA playoffs ===
In the Western Conference First Round of the 1989 NBA playoffs, the Trail Blazers faced off against the top–seeded, and 2-time defending NBA champion Los Angeles Lakers, who won the Pacific Division title; the team was led by the quartet of All-Star guard, and Most Valuable Player of the Year, Magic Johnson, All-Star forward James Worthy, Byron Scott, and All-Star center Kareem Abdul-Jabbar. The Trail Blazers lost the first two games to the Lakers on the road at the Great Western Forum, before losing Game 3 at home, 116–108 at the Memorial Coliseum, thus losing the series in a three-game sweep; it was the fourth consecutive year that the Trail Blazers lost in the opening round of the NBA playoffs.

The Lakers would advance to the NBA Finals for the third consecutive year, but would lose to the Detroit Pistons in a four-game sweep in the 1989 NBA Finals.

=== Aftermath ===
Following the season, the oft-injured Bowie was traded to the New Jersey Nets, while Jones signed as a free agent with the San Antonio Spurs, Branch was released to free agency, and Johnson was left unprotected in the 1989 NBA expansion draft, where he was selected by the Minnesota Timberwolves expansion team.

== Draft picks ==
Round	Pick	Player	Position	Nationality	School/Club team
1	21	Mark Bryant	PF	United States	Seton Hall
2	26	Rolando Ferreira	C	Brazil	Houston
3	53	Anthony Mason	PF	United States	Tennessee State
3	71	Craig Neal	G	United States	Georgia Tech

== Roster ==
1988–89 Portland Trail Blazers roster
Players

Pos.	No.	Player	Height	Weight	DOB	From
F	35	Richard Anderson	6 ft 10 in (2.08 m)	240 lb (109 kg)	1960–11–19	UC Santa Barbara
C	31	Sam Bowie	7 ft 1 in (2.16 m)	235 lb (107 kg)	1961–03–17	Kentucky
F	24	Adrian Branch	6 ft 7 in (2.01 m)	185 lb (84 kg)	1963–11–17	Maryland
F	2	Mark Bryant	6 ft 9 in (2.06 m)	245 lb (111 kg)	1965–04–25	Seton Hall
G	22	Clyde Drexler	6 ft 7 in (2.01 m)	210 lb (95 kg)	1962–06–22	Houston
C	00	Kevin Duckworth	7 ft 0 in (2.13 m)	275 lb (125 kg)	1964–04–01	Eastern Illinois
C	32	Rolando Ferreira	7 ft 1 in (2.16 m)	240 lb (109 kg)	1964–05–24	Houston
C	33	Steve Johnson	6 ft 10 in (2.08 m)	235 lb (107 kg)	1957–11–03	Oregon State
F	27	Caldwell Jones	6 ft 11 in (2.11 m)	217 lb (98 kg)	1950–08–04	Albany State
F	25	Jerome Kersey	6 ft 7 in (2.01 m)	215 lb (98 kg)	1962–06–26	Longwood
G	30	Terry Porter	6 ft 3 in (1.91 m)	195 lb (88 kg)	1963–04–08	UW–Stevens Point
G	14	Jerry Sichting	6 ft 1 in (1.85 m)	168 lb (76 kg)	1956–11–29	Purdue
G	7	Brook Steppe	6 ft 5 in (1.96 m)	195 lb (88 kg)	1959–11–07	Georgia Tech
G	21	Danny Young	6 ft 3 in (1.91 m)	175 lb (79 kg)	1962–07–26	Wake Forest

Coaches
Head coach
- Rick Adelman
Assistant(s)
- Maurice Lucas
- Jack Schalow
- John Wetzel

Legend
- (DP) Unsigned draft pick
- (FA) Free agent
- (S) Suspended
- Injured

== Regular season ==
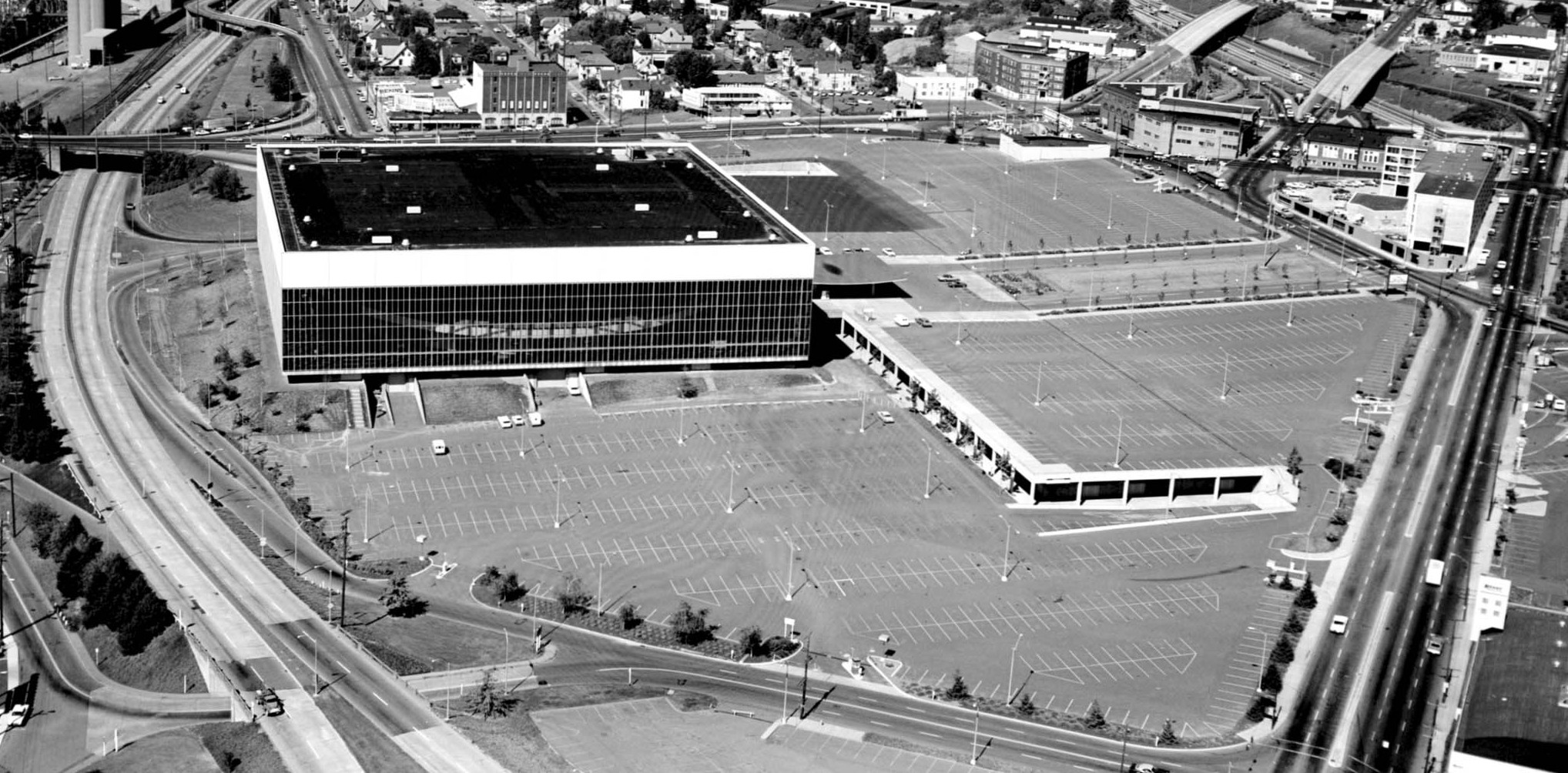
The Trail Blazers played their home games at Veterans Memorial Coliseum.

=== Season standings ===
Pacific Division	W	L	PCT	GB	Home	Road	Div
y-Los Angeles Lakers	57	25	.695	–	35–6	22–19	25–9
x-Phoenix Suns	55	27	.671	2	35–6	20–21	23–11
x-Seattle SuperSonics	47	35	.573	10	31–10	16–25	20–14
x-Golden State Warriors	43	39	.524	14	29–12	14–27	15–19
x-Portland Trail Blazers	39	43	.476	18	28–13	11–30	17–17
Sacramento Kings	27	55	.329	30	21–20	6–35	12–22
Los Angeles Clippers	21	61	.256	36	17–24	4–37	7–27

#	Western Conference				
#	Team	W	L	PCT	GB
1	c-Los Angeles Lakers	57	25	.695	–
2	y-Utah Jazz	51	31	.622	6
3	x-Phoenix Suns	55	27	.671	2
4	x-Seattle SuperSonics	47	35	.573	10
5	x-Houston Rockets	45	37	.549	12
6	x-Denver Nuggets	44	38	.537	13
7	x-Golden State Warriors	43	39	.524	14
8	x-Portland Trail Blazers	39	43	.476	18
9	Dallas Mavericks	38	44	.463	19
10	Sacramento Kings	27	55	.329	30
11	San Antonio Spurs	21	61	.256	36
12	Los Angeles Clippers	21	61	.256	36
13	Miami Heat	15	67	.183	42

z - clinched division title
y - clinched division title
x - clinched playoff spot

== Game log ==
=== Regular season ===
1988–89 game log
Total: 39–43 (home: 28–13; road: 11–30)
November: 7–7 (home: 6–1; road: 1–6)

Game	Date	Team	Score	High points	High rebounds	High assists	Location Attendance	Record
1	November 4	Phoenix	W 120–105				Memorial Coliseum	1–0
2	November 5	Sacramento	W 121–103				Memorial Coliseum	2–0
3	November 10	@ Denver	L 115–135				McNichols Sports Arena	2–1
4	November 12	@ Golden State	L 100–107				Oakland–Alameda County Coliseum Arena	2–2
5	November 13	Denver	L 132–143				Memorial Coliseum	2–3
6	November 15	L.A. Clippers	W 125–103				Memorial Coliseum	3–3
7	November 17	@ Utah	L 99–123				Salt Palace	3–4
8	November 18	@ L.A. Lakers	L 105–106				The Forum	3–5
9	November 20	New Jersey	W 117–106				Memorial Coliseum	4–5
10	November 22	@ Seattle	W 125–104				Seattle Center Coliseum	5–5
11	November 25	Houston	W 111–94				Memorial Coliseum	6–5
12	November 27	Golden State	W 109–94				Memorial Coliseum	7–5
13	November 29	@ Milwaukee	L 114–119				Bradley Center	7–6
14	November 30	@ Philadelphia	L 106–114				The Spectrum	7–7

December: 9–4 (home: 5–0; road: 4–4)

Game	Date	Team	Score	High points	High rebounds	High assists	Location Attendance	Record
15	December 2	@ Miami	W 105–102				Miami Arena	8–7
16	December 3	@ Atlanta	L 97–115				The Omni	8–8
17	December 6	@ New Jersey	W 97–93				Brendan Byrne Arena	9–8
18	December 7	@ Indiana	L 120–129				Market Square Arena	9–9
19	December 9	Washington	W 93–90				Memorial Coliseum	10–9
20	December 11	San Antonio	W 128–123 (OT)				Memorial Coliseum	11–9
21	December 13	L.A. Clippers	W 113–92				Memorial Coliseum	12–9
22	December 16	@ Phoenix	L 125–132				Arizona Veterans Memorial Coliseum	12–10
23	December 17	Phoenix	W 115–97				Memorial Coliseum	13–10
24	December 20	@ Denver	W 127–124				McNichols Sports Arena	14–10
25	December 22	@ Golden State	W 117–109				Oakland–Alameda County Coliseum Arena	15–10
26	December 23	Golden State	W 111–107				Memorial Coliseum	16–10
27	December 27	@ Sacramento	L 111–112				ARCO Arena	16–11

January: 6–8 (home: 5–4; road: 1–4)

Game	Date	Team	Score	High points	High rebounds	High assists	Location Attendance	Record
28	January 3	Miami	W 119–95				Memorial Coliseum	17–11
29	January 4	@ L.A. Lakers	L 120–133				Great Western Forum	17–12
30	January 6	Sacramento	W 147–142 (2OT)				Memorial Coliseum	18–12
31	January 7	@ Seattle	L 123–129				Seattle Center Coliseum	18–13
32	January 10	Seattle	W 125–109				Memorial Coliseum	19–13
33	January 12	@ Houston	L 106–116				The Summit	19–14
34	January 14	@ San Antonio	W 103–99				HemisFair Arena	20–14
35	January 15	@ Dallas	L 108–111				Reunion Arena	20–15
36	January 17	Utah	L 110–111				Memorial Coliseum	20–16
37	January 22	New York	L 116–120				Memorial Coliseum	20–17
38	January 24	Seattle	L 100–103				Memorial Coliseum	20–18
39	January 26	Milwaukee	L 109–127				Memorial Coliseum	20–19
40	January 28	Atlanta	W 110–94				Memorial Coliseum	21–19
41	January 30	Charlotte	W 130–118				Memorial Coliseum	22–19

February: 5–7 (home: 3–3; road: 2–4)

Game	Date	Team	Score	High points	High rebounds	High assists	Location Attendance	Record
42	February 1	@ L.A. Clippers	W 108–107				Los Angeles Memorial Sports Arena	23–19
43	February 3	@ L.A. Lakers	L 129–140				Great Western Forum	23–20
44	February 4	San Antonio	W 137–100				Memorial Coliseum	24–20
45	February 7	Dallas	W 134–125				Memorial Coliseum	25–20
46	February 9	Houston	L 110–113				Memorial Coliseum	25–21
47	February 16	L.A. Lakers	L 101–110				Memorial Coliseum	25–22
48	February 18	Seattle	L 115–116				Memorial Coliseum	25–23
49	February 20	@ Chicago	L 98–102				Chicago Stadium	25–24
50	February 22	@ Detroit	L 94–105				The Palace of Auburn Hills	25–25
51	February 24	@ Cleveland	L 91–128				Richfield Coliseum	25–26
52	February 26	@ Miami	W 124–102				Miami Arena	26–26
53	February 28	Phoenix	W 139–134				Memorial Coliseum	27–26

March: 5–12 (home: 3–3; road: 2–9)

Game	Date	Team	Score	High points	High rebounds	High assists	Location Attendance	Record
54	March 2	@ L.A. Clippers	W 119–113				Los Angeles Memorial Sports Arena	28–26
55	March 3	Philadelphia	W 129–121				Memorial Coliseum	29–26
56	March 5	Indiana	L 118–121 (OT)				Memorial Coliseum	29–27
57	March 7	@ San Antonio	W 116–103				HemisFair Arena	30–27
58	March 8	@ Dallas	L 92–99				Reunion Arena	31–27
59	March 12	Cleveland	L 110–122				Memorial Coliseum	31–28
60	March 14	Golden State	W 139–110				Memorial Coliseum	31–29
61	March 15	@ Utah	L 95–102				Salt Palace	31–30
62	March 17	@ Phoenix	L 124–129				Arizona Veterans Memorial Coliseum	31–31
63	March 18	@ Houston	L 113–127				The Summit	31–32
64	March 20	Dallas	W 112–91				Memorial Coliseum	32–32
65	March 21	@ Golden State	L 127–151				Oakland–Alameda County Coliseum Arena	32–33
66	March 24	Chicago	L 113–128				Memorial Coliseum	32–34
67	March 25	@ Sacramento	L 105–106				ARCO Arena	32–35
68	March 28	@ New York	L 124–128				Madison Square Garden	32–36
69	March 29	@ Boston	L 97–106				Boston Garden	32–37
70	March 31	@ Washington	L 105–107				Capital Centre	32–38

April: 7–5 (home: 6–2; road: 1–3)

Game	Date	Team	Score	High points	High rebounds	High assists	Location Attendance	Record
71	April 1	@ Charlotte	W 125–121 (OT)				Charlotte Coliseum	33–38
72	April 4	Detroit	W 118–100				Memorial Coliseum	34–38
73	April 6	@ L.A. Clippers	L 123–133				Los Angeles Memorial Sports Arena	34–39
74	April 7	Boston	W 113–100				Memorial Coliseum	35–39
75	April 9	Denver	W 120–114				Memorial Coliseum	36–39
76	April 11	L.A. Clippers	W 126–102				Memorial Coliseum	37–39
77	April 14	Miami	W 97–86				Memorial Coliseum	38–39
78	April 15	Utah	L 95–99				Memorial Coliseum	38–40
79	April 18	@ Sacramento	L 118–120				ARCO Arena	38–41
80	April 20	@ Seattle	L 118–124				Seattle Center Coliseum	38–42
81	April 21	L.A. Lakers	L 114–121				Memorial Coliseum	38–43
82	April 23	Sacramento	W 126–120 (OT)				Memorial Coliseum	39–43

1988–89 schedule

=== Playoffs ===
1989 playoff game log
First round: 0–3 (home: 0–1; road: 0–2)

Game	Date	Team	Score	High points	High rebounds	High assists	Location Attendance	Series
1	April 27	@ L.A. Lakers	L 108–128	Clyde Drexler (30)	Kersey, Porter (9)	Terry Porter (10)	Great Western Forum; 17,505	0–1
2	April 30	@ L.A. Lakers	L 105–113	Clyde Drexler (28)	Jerome Kersey (11)	Clyde Drexler (10)	Great Western Forum; 17,505	0–2
3	May 3	L.A. Lakers	L 108–116	Terry Porter (29)	Clyde Drexler (8)	Terry Porter (9)	Memorial Coliseum; 12,880	0–3

1989 schedule

== Player statistics ==
Legend
GP	Games played	GS	Games started	MPG	Minutes per game
FG%	Field-goal percentage	3P%	3-point field-goal percentage	FT%	Free-throw percentage
RPG	Rebounds per game	APG	Assists per game	SPG	Steals per game
BPG	Blocks per game	PPG	Points per game

== Awards and honors ==
- Clyde Drexler, NBA All-Star
- Kevin Duckworth, NBA All-Star
