= 1988–89 Dallas Mavericks season =

NBA professional basketball team season

- Head coach: John MacLeod
- General manager: Norm Sonju
- Owner: Don Carter
- Arena: Reunion Arena

Results
- Record: 38–44 (.463)
- Place: Division: 4th (Midwest); Conference: 9th (Western)
- Playoff finish: Did not qualify
- Stats at Basketball Reference

Local media
- Television: KTVT (Allen Stone, Ted Davis); Home Sports Entertainment (Allen Stone, Norm Hitzges)
- Radio: WBAP (Allen Stone, Ted Davis)

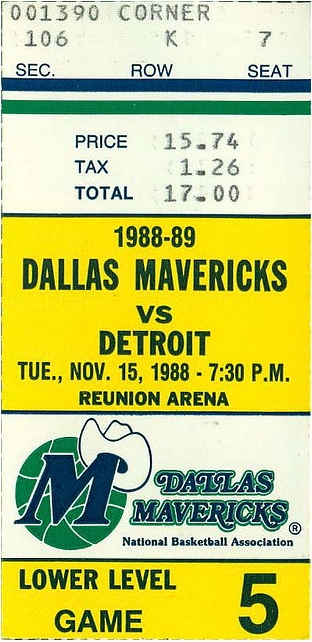
A ticket for a November 1988 game between the Mavericks and the season's eventual champions Detroit Pistons.

The 1988–89 Dallas Mavericks season was the ninth season for the Dallas Mavericks in the National Basketball Association.

== Season summary ==
=== Off-season ===
During the off-season, the team signed free agent Terry Tyler.

=== Regular season ===
After reaching the Conference Finals last year, the Mavericks got off to a fast start by winning nine of their first twelve games of the regular season. However, after a 17–9 start to the season, the team posted a seven-game losing streak in January, and later on held a 24–21 record at the All-Star break. In January, sixth man Roy Tarpley was suspended indefinitely for violating the league's anti-drug policy; Tarpley was also out due to a knee injury, only playing just 19 games.

At mid-season, the team traded All-Star forward Mark Aguirre, who had several incidents with the team during the season, to the Detroit Pistons in exchange for former All-Star forward Adrian Dantley, and dealt Detlef Schrempf to the Indiana Pacers in exchange for Herb Williams. Before the trades, Aguirre averaged 21.7 points, 5.3 rebounds and 4.3 assists per game in 44 games, while Schrempf provided with 9.5 points and 4.5 rebounds per game in 37 games. Aguirre would win a championship with the Pistons, as they defeated the 2-time defending NBA champion Los Angeles Lakers in a four-game sweep in the 1989 NBA Finals.

After hovering a few games over .500 in winning percentage for most of the regular season, the Mavericks collapsed and suffered a 12-game losing streak in March, which sealed their fate for the entire season. The Mavericks finished in fourth place in the Midwest Division with a 38–44 record; it was the first time since the 1982–83 season that the team failed to qualify for the NBA playoffs, as they finished just one game behind the 8th–seeded Portland Trail Blazers.

Dantley averaged 20.3 points per game in 31 games after the trade, while Rolando Blackman averaged 19.7 points and 3.7 assists per game, and Derek Harper provided the team with 17.3 points, 7.0 assists and 2.1 steals per game, and also led them with 99 three-point field goals. In addition, Sam Perkins provided with 15.0 points and 8.8 rebounds per game, while Tarpley contributed 17.3 points, 11.5 rebounds and 1.6 blocks per game, and James Donaldson averaged 9.1 points, 10.8 rebounds and 1.5 blocks per game, but only played 53 games due to a knee injury. Meanwhile, Williams averaged 6.6 points, 6.6 rebounds and 1.8 blocks per game in 30 games, Brad Davis contributed 6.4 points and 3.1 assists per game, Tyler provided with 5.5 points and 3.0 rebounds per game, and Bill Wennington averaged 4.6 points and 4.4 rebounds per game.

During the NBA All-Star weekend at the Houston Astrodome in Houston, Texas, Harper participated in the NBA Three-Point Shootout. The Mavericks finished eighth in the NBA in home-game attendance, with an attendance of 695,056 at the Reunion Arena during the regular season.

=== Aftermath ===
Following the season, Tyler was released to free agency.

== Draft picks ==
| Round | Pick | Player | Position | Nationality | College |
|---|---|---|---|---|---|
| 2 | 46 | Morlon Wiley | SG | United States | Long Beach State |
| 2 | 49 | Jose Vargas | C | Dominican Republic | LSU |
| 3 | 70 | Jerry Johnson | | United States | Florida Southern |

== Roster ==
1988–89 Dallas Mavericks roster
Players

| Pos. | No. | Player | Height | Weight | DOB | From |
|---|---|---|---|---|---|---|
| C | 33 | Uwe Blab | 7 ft 1 in (2.16 m) | 252 lb (114 kg) | 1962–03–26 | Indiana |
| G | 22 | Rolando Blackman | 6 ft 6 in (1.98 m) | 190 lb (86 kg) | 1959–02–26 | Kansas State |
| F | 4 | Adrian Dantley | 6 ft 5 in (1.96 m) | 208 lb (94 kg) | 1955–02–28 | Notre Dame |
| G | 15 | Brad Davis | 6 ft 3 in (1.91 m) | 180 lb (82 kg) | 1955–12–17 | Maryland |
| C | 40 | James Donaldson | 7 ft 2 in (2.18 m) | 275 lb (125 kg) | 1957–08–16 | Washington State |
| G | 12 | Derek Harper | 6 ft 4 in (1.93 m) | 185 lb (84 kg) | 1961–10–13 | Illinois |
| G | 21 | Anthony Jones | 6 ft 6 in (1.98 m) | 195 lb (88 kg) | 1962–09–13 | UNLV |
| F | 44 | Sam Perkins | 6 ft 9 in (2.06 m) | 239 lb (108 kg) | 1961–06–14 | North Carolina |
| F/C | 42 | Roy Tarpley | 6 ft 11 in (2.11 m) | 230 lb (104 kg) | 1964–11–28 | Michigan |
| F | 41 | Terry Tyler | 6 ft 7 in (2.01 m) | 215 lb (98 kg) | 1956–10–30 | Detroit Mercy |
| C | 23 | Bill Wennington | 7 ft 0 in (2.13 m) | 245 lb (111 kg) | 1963–12–26 | St. John's |
| G | 20 | Morlon Wiley | 6 ft 4 in (1.93 m) | 185 lb (84 kg) | 1966–09–24 | Long Beach State |
| C | 32 | Herb Williams | 6 ft 10 in (2.08 m) | 242 lb (110 kg) | 1958–02–16 | Ohio State |

Coaches
Head coach
- John MacLeod
Assistant(s)
- Richie Adubato
- Garfield Heard
- Clifford Ray

Legend
- (DP) Unsigned draft pick
- (FA) Free agent
- (S) Suspended
- Injured

== Regular season ==
=== Season standings ===
| Midwest Division | W | L | PCT | GB | Home | Road | Div |
|---|---|---|---|---|---|---|---|
| y-Utah Jazz | 51 | 31 | .622 | – | 34–7 | 17–24 | 19–11 |
| x-Houston Rockets | 45 | 37 | .549 | 6 | 31–10 | 14–27 | 19–11 |
| x-Denver Nuggets | 44 | 38 | .537 | 7 | 35–6 | 9–32 | 18–12 |
| Dallas Mavericks | 38 | 44 | .463 | 13 | 24–17 | 14–27 | 19–11 |
| San Antonio Spurs | 21 | 61 | .256 | 30 | 18–23 | 3–38 | 9–21 |
| Miami Heat | 15 | 67 | .183 | 36 | 12–29 | 3–38 | 6–24 |

| # | Western Conference | | | | |
| # | Team | W | L | PCT | GB |
|---|---|---|---|---|---|
| 1 | c-Los Angeles Lakers | 57 | 25 | .695 | – |
| 2 | y-Utah Jazz | 51 | 31 | .622 | 6 |
| 3 | x-Phoenix Suns | 55 | 27 | .671 | 2 |
| 4 | x-Seattle SuperSonics | 47 | 35 | .573 | 10 |
| 5 | x-Houston Rockets | 45 | 37 | .549 | 12 |
| 6 | x-Denver Nuggets | 44 | 38 | .537 | 13 |
| 7 | x-Golden State Warriors | 43 | 39 | .524 | 14 |
| 8 | x-Portland Trail Blazers | 39 | 43 | .476 | 18 |
| 9 | Dallas Mavericks | 38 | 44 | .463 | 19 |
| 10 | Sacramento Kings | 27 | 55 | .329 | 30 |
| 11 | San Antonio Spurs | 21 | 61 | .256 | 36 |
| 12 | Los Angeles Clippers | 21 | 61 | .256 | 36 |
| 13 | Miami Heat | 15 | 67 | .183 | 42 |

z - clinched division title
y - clinched division title
x - clinched playoff spot

=== Game log ===
1988–89 game log
Total: 38–44 (Home: 24–17; Road: 14–27)
November: 9–4 (home: 7–3; road: 2–1)

| Game | Date | Team | Score | High points | High rebounds | High assists | Location Attendance | Record |
|---|---|---|---|---|---|---|---|---|
| 1 | November 4, 1988 | L.A. Lakers | L 113–116 | | | | Reunion Arena | 0–1 |
| 2 | November 5, 1988 | @ Houston | W 114–113 (OT) | | | | The Summit | 1–1 |
| 3 | November 8, 1988 | Miami | W 92–88 | | | | Reunion Arena | 2–1 |
| 4 | November 9, 1988 | @ Phoenix | L 103–111 | | | | Arizona Veterans Memorial Coliseum | 2–2 |
| 5 | November 11, 1988 | San Antonio | W 115–102 | | | | Reunion Arena | 3–2 |
| 6 | November 12, 1988 | Sacramento | W 111–71 | | | | Reunion Arena | 4–2 |
| 7 | November 15, 1988 | Detroit | L 99–108 | | | | Reunion Arena | 4–3 |
| 8 | November 17, 1988 | Charlotte | W 105–93 | | | | Reunion Arena | 5–3 |
| 9 | November 19, 1988 | @ Seattle | W 112–106 | | | | Seattle Center Coliseum | 6–3 |
| 10 | November 23, 1988 | Denver | W 125–106 | | | | Reunion Arena | 7–3 |
| 11 | November 25, 1988 | Atlanta | W 100–95 | | | | Reunion Arena | 8–3 |
| 12 | November 26, 1988 | Utah | W 113–93 | | | | Reunion Arena | 9–3 |
| 13 | November 30, 1988 | Houston | L 89–101 | | | | Reunion Arena | 9–4 |

December: 8–5 (home: 4–3; road: 4–2)

| Game | Date | Team | Score | High points | High rebounds | High assists | Location Attendance | Record |
|---|---|---|---|---|---|---|---|---|
| 14 | December 2, 1988 | New York | L 101–104 | | | | Reunion Arena | 9–5 |
| 15 | December 3, 1988 | Chicago | L 100–113 | | | | Reunion Arena | 9–6 |
| 16 | December 7, 1988 | Seattle | W 102–98 | | | | Reunion Arena | 10–6 |
| 17 | December 9, 1988 | @ Utah | W 97–89 | | | | Salt Palace | 11–6 |
| 18 | December 10, 1988 | Cleveland | L 98–102 | | | | Reunion Arena | 11–7 |
| 19 | December 13, 1988 | Golden State | W 117–111 | | | | Reunion Arena | 12–7 |
| 20 | December 16, 1988 | @ Charlotte | W 107–98 | | | | Charlotte Coliseum | 13–7 |
| 21 | December 17, 1988 | @ Miami | W 104–87 | | | | Miami Arena | 14–7 |
| 22 | December 20, 1988 | @ Philadelphia | W 108–102 | | | | The Spectrum | 15–7 |
| 23 | December 21, 1988 | @ New Jersey | L 120–122 (OT) | | | | Brendan Byrne Arena | 15–8 |
| 24 | December 23, 1988 | @ Milwaukee | L 101–113 | | | | Bradley Center | 15–9 |
| 25 | December 27, 1988 | San Antonio | W 110–101 | | | | Reunion Arena | 16–9 |
| 26 | December 29, 1988 | Boston | W 131–115 | | | | Reunion Arena | 17–9 |

January: 4–11 (home: 4–3; road: 0–8)

| Game | Date | Team | Score | High points | High rebounds | High assists | Location Attendance | Record |
|---|---|---|---|---|---|---|---|---|
| 27 | January 3, 1989 | @ Sacramento | L 96–123 | | | | ARCO Arena | 17–10 |
| 28 | January 6, 1989 | @ Phoenix | L 111–120 | | | | Arizona Veterans Memorial Coliseum | 17–11 |
| 29 | January 7, 1989 | @ Denver | L 94–115 | | | | McNichols Sports Arena | 17–12 |
| 30 | January 9, 1989 | Philadelphia | L 103–121 | | | | Reunion Arena | 17–13 |
| 31 | January 11, 1989 | @ Golden State | L 106–107 | | | | Oakland-Alameda County Coliseum Arena | 17–14 |
| 32 | January 12, 1989 | @ Seattle | L 95–130 | | | | Seattle Center Coliseum | 17–15 |
| 33 | January 14, 1989 | @ Houston | L 98–110 | | | | The Summit | 17–16 |
| 34 | January 15, 1989 | Portland | W 111–108 | | | | Reunion Arena | 18–16 |
| 35 | January 18, 1989 | Denver | W 102–92 | | | | Reunion Arena | 19–16 |
| 36 | January 20, 1989 | @ L.A. Lakers | L 99–115 | | | | Great Western Forum | 19–17 |
| 37 | January 24, 1989 | @ Chicago | L 91–109 | | | | Chicago Stadium | 19–18 |
| 38 | January 25, 1989 | L.A. Clippers | W 117–98 | | | | Reunion Arena | 20–18 |
| 39 | January 27, 1989 | San Antonio | W 126–82 | | | | Reunion Arena | 21–18 |
| 40 | January 29, 1989 | L.A. Lakers | L 93–118 | | | | Reunion Arena | 21–19 |
| 41 | January 31, 1989 | Utah | L 84–99 | | | | Reunion Arena | 21–20 |

February: 8–5 (home: 4–2; road: 4–3)

| Game | Date | Team | Score | High points | High rebounds | High assists | Location Attendance | Record |
|---|---|---|---|---|---|---|---|---|
| 42 | February 3, 1989 | Phoenix | W 121–117 | | | | Reunion Arena | 22–20 |
| 43 | February 6, 1989 | @ L.A. Clippers | W 129–111 | | | | Los Angeles Memorial Sports Arena | 23–20 |
| 44 | February 7, 1989 | @ Portland | L 125–134 | | | | Memorial Coliseum | 23–21 |
| 45 | February 9, 1989 | @ Utah | W 94–87 | | | | Salt Palace | 24–21 |
| 46 | February 14, 1989 | L.A. Clippers | W 117–98 | | | | Reunion Arena | 25–21 |
| 47 | February 16, 1989 | Miami | W 93–80 | | | | Reunion Arena | 26–21 |
| 48 | February 18, 1989 | Houston | L 94–105 | | | | Reunion Arena | 26–22 |
| 49 | February 20, 1989 | @ San Antonio | W 105–93 | | | | HemisFair Arena | 27–22 |
| 50 | February 22, 1989 | @ Denver | L 106–109 | | | | McNichols Sports Arena | 27–23 |
| 51 | February 24, 1989 | Golden State | L 92–127 | | | | Reunion Arena | 27–24 |
| 52 | February 25, 1989 | Washington | W 127–93 | | | | Reunion Arena | 28–24 |
| 53 | February 27, 1989 | @ Atlanta | L 83–105 | | | | The Omni | 28–25 |
| 54 | February 28, 1989 | @ Miami | W 111–110 (OT) | | | | Miami Arena | 29–25 |

March: 3–14 (home: 2–2; road: 1–12)

| Game | Date | Team | Score | High points | High rebounds | High assists | Location Attendance | Record |
|---|---|---|---|---|---|---|---|---|
| 55 | March 3, 1989 | @ Boston | L 106–107 | | | | Boston Garden | 29–26 |
| 56 | March 4, 1989 | @ Washington | L 105–119 | | | | Capital Centre | 29–27 |
| 57 | March 6, 1989 | New Jersey | W 105–99 | | | | Reunion Arena | 30–27 |
| 58 | March 8, 1989 | Portland | W 99–92 | | | | Reunion Arena | 31–27 |
| 59 | March 10, 1989 | @ Houston | L 86–96 | | | | The Summit | 31–28 |
| 60 | March 11, 1989 | @ San Antonio | L 90–97 | | | | HemisFair Arena | 31–29 |
| 61 | March 13, 1989 | Milwaukee | L 95–111 | | | | Reunion Arena | 31–30 |
| 62 | March 15, 1989 | @ Golden State | L 100–113 | | | | Oakland-Alameda County Coliseum Arena | 31–31 |
| 63 | March 17, 1989 | @ L.A. Lakers | L 103–106 | | | | Great Western Forum | 31–32 |
| 64 | March 18, 1989 | @ Sacramento | L 90–100 | | | | ARCO Arena | 31–33 |
| 65 | March 20, 1989 | @ Portland | L 91–112 | | | | Memorial Coliseum | 31–34 |
| 66 | March 22, 1989 | @ L.A. Clippers | L 112–116 | | | | Los Angeles Memorial Sports Arena | 31–35 |
| 67 | March 24, 1989 | Denver | L 105–114 | | | | Reunion Arena | 31–36 |
| 68 | March 27, 1989 | @ Detroit | L 77–90 | | | | The Palace of Auburn Hills | 31–37 |
| 69 | March 28, 1989 | @ Cleveland | L 90–102 | | | | Richfield Coliseum | 31–38 |
| 70 | March 30, 1989 | @ New York | L 98–99 | | | | Madison Square Garden | 31–39 |
| 71 | March 31, 1989 | @ Indiana | W 105–102 | | | | Market Square Arena | 32–39 |

April: 6–5 (home: 3–4; road: 3–1)

| Game | Date | Team | Score | High points | High rebounds | High assists | Location Attendance | Record |
|---|---|---|---|---|---|---|---|---|
| 72 | April 2, 1989 | Miami | W 98–96 | | | | Reunion Arena | 33–39 |
| 73 | April 4, 1989 | @ Utah | L 80–95 | | | | Salt Palace | 33–40 |
| 74 | April 7, 1989 | Sacramento | W 115–102 | | | | Reunion Arena | 34–40 |
| 75 | April 8, 1989 | Seattle | L 90–114 | | | | Reunion Arena | 34–41 |
| 76 | April 10, 1989 | Indiana | L 103–110 | | | | Reunion Arena | 34–42 |
| 77 | April 12, 1989 | Phoenix | L 94–109 | | | | Reunion Arena | 34–43 |
| 78 | April 14, 1989 | @ San Antonio | W 118–110 | | | | HemisFair Arena | 35–43 |
| 79 | April 16, 1989 | Houston | L 112–114 (OT) | | | | Reunion Arena | 35–44 |
| 80 | April 18, 1989 | @ Miami | W 103–99 | | | | Miami Arena | 36–44 |
| 81 | April 21, 1989 | Utah | W 91–89 | | | | Reunion Arena | 37–44 |
| 82 | April 23, 1989 | @ Denver | W 113–96 | | | | McNichols Sports Arena | 38–44 |

1988–89 schedule

== Player statistics ==
=== Regular season ===
| Player | POS | GP | GS | MP | REB | AST | STL | BLK | PTS | MPG | RPG | APG | SPG | BPG | PPG |
|---|---|---|---|---|---|---|---|---|---|---|---|---|---|---|---|
| Derek Harper | PG | 81 | 81 | 2,968 | 228 | 570 | 172 | 41 | 1,404 | 36.6 | 2.8 | 7.0 | 2.1 | .5 | 17.3 |
| Rolando Blackman | SG | 78 | 78 | 2,946 | 273 | 288 | 65 | 20 | 1,534 | 37.8 | 3.5 | 3.7 | .8 | .3 | 19.7 |
| Sam Perkins | PF | 78 | 77 | 2,860 | 688 | 127 | 76 | 92 | 1,171 | 36.7 | 8.8 | 1.6 | 1.0 | 1.2 | 15.0 |
| Brad Davis | PG | 78 | 4 | 1,395 | 108 | 242 | 48 | 18 | 497 | 17.9 | 1.4 | 3.1 | .6 | .2 | 6.4 |
| Terry Tyler | SF | 70 | 11 | 1,057 | 209 | 40 | 24 | 39 | 386 | 15.1 | 3.0 | .6 | .3 | .6 | 5.5 |
| Bill Wennington | C | 65 | 9 | 1,074 | 286 | 46 | 16 | 35 | 300 | 16.5 | 4.4 | .7 | .2 | .5 | 4.6 |
| James Donaldson | C | 53 | 53 | 1,746 | 570 | 38 | 24 | 81 | 481 | 32.9 | 10.8 | .7 | .5 | 1.5 | 9.1 |
| Morlon Wiley | PG | 51 | 1 | 408 | 47 | 76 | 25 | 6 | 111 | 8.0 | .9 | 1.5 | .5 | .1 | 2.2 |
| Mark Aguirre^{†} | SF | 44 | 44 | 1,529 | 235 | 189 | 29 | 29 | 953 | 34.8 | 5.3 | 4.3 | .7 | .7 | 21.7 |
| Detlef Schrempf^{†} | PF | 37 | 1 | 845 | 166 | 86 | 24 | 9 | 353 | 22.8 | 4.5 | 2.3 | .6 | .2 | 9.5 |
| Uwe Blab | C | 37 | 0 | 208 | 44 | 12 | 3 | 13 | 68 | 5.6 | 1.2 | .3 | .1 | .4 | 1.8 |
| Adrian Dantley^{†} | SF | 31 | 25 | 1,081 | 153 | 78 | 20 | 7 | 628 | 34.9 | 4.9 | 2.5 | .6 | .2 | 20.3 |
| Herb Williams^{†} | C | 30 | 20 | 903 | 197 | 36 | 15 | 54 | 199 | 30.1 | 6.6 | 1.2 | .5 | 1.8 | 6.6 |
| Anthony Jones^{†} | SG | 25 | 0 | 131 | 20 | 13 | 9 | 2 | 64 | 5.2 | .8 | .5 | .4 | .1 | 2.6 |
| Roy Tarpley | PF | 19 | 6 | 591 | 218 | 17 | 28 | 30 | 328 | 31.1 | 11.5 | .9 | 1.5 | 1.6 | 17.3 |
| Steve Alford^{†} | PG | 9 | 0 | 38 | 3 | 9 | 1 | 0 | 7 | 4.2 | .3 | 1.0 | .1 | .0 | .8 |

- ^{†} Denotes player spent time with another team in the season. Stats reflect time with the Mavericks only.

== Transactions ==
=== Trades ===
| February 15, 1989 | To Dallas Mavericks Adrian Dantley; 1991 1st round pick | To Detroit Pistons Mark Aguirre |
| February 11, 1989 | To Dallas Mavericks Herb Williams | To Indiana Pacers Detlef Schrempf; 1990 2nd round pick |

Player Transactions Citation:

== See also ==
- 1988-89 NBA season
