= 1988–89 Houston Rockets season =

NBA season

- Head coach: Don Chaney
- General manager: Ray Patterson
- Owner: Charlie Thomas
- Arena: The Summit

Results
- Record: 45–37 (.549)
- Place: Division: 2nd (Midwest); Conference: 5th (Western)
- Playoff finish: First round (lost to SuperSonics 1–3)
- Stats at Basketball Reference

Local media
- Television: KTXH; Home Sports Entertainment (Bill Worrell, McCoy McLemore)
- Radio: KTRH (Gene Peterson, Bill Foley)

The 1988–89 Houston Rockets season was the 22nd season for the Houston Rockets in the National Basketball Association, and their 18th season in Houston, Texas. The city of Houston hosted the NBA All-Star weekend at the Houston Astrodome this season.

== Season summary ==
=== Off-season ===
The Rockets had the 16th overall pick in the 1988 NBA draft, and selected small forward Derrick Chievous from the University of Missouri. During the off-season, the team acquired Otis Thorpe from the Sacramento Kings, signed free agent Mike Woodson, acquired Tim McCormick and Frank Johnson from the New Jersey Nets, and hired Don Chaney as their new head coach.

=== Regular season ===
Under Chaney, and with the addition of Thorpe and Woodson, the Rockets won seven of their first ten games of the regular season, posted a six-game winning streak in December, and later on held a 28–18 record at the All-Star break. At mid-season, the team signed free agent Walter Berry, who was previously released by the New Jersey Nets. Despite a seven-game losing streak between February and March, the Rockets finished in second place in the Midwest Division with a 45–37 record, and earned the fifth seed in the Western Conference; the team qualified for the NBA playoffs for the fifth consecutive year.

Akeem Olajuwon averaged 24.8 points, 13.5 rebounds, 2.6 steals and 3.4 blocks per game, and was named to the All-NBA First Team, while Thorpe averaged 16.7 points and 9.6 rebounds per game, and Sleepy Floyd provided the team with 14.2 points, 8.6 assists and 1.5 steals per game, and also led them with 109 three-point field goals. In addition, Woodson contributed 12.9 points per game, while Buck Johnson provided with 9.6 points per game. Off the bench, Chievous averaged 9.3 points and 3.2 rebounds per game, while Berry provided with 8.8 points and 3.8 rebounds per game in 40 games, Purvis Short contributed 7.4 points per game, McCormick averaged 5.2 points and 3.2 rebounds per game, and Frank Johnson contributed 4.4 points and 2.7 assists per game.

During the NBA All-Star weekend at the Houston Astrodome in Houston, Olajuwon was selected for the 1989 NBA All-Star Game, as a member of the Western Conference All-Star team. Olajuwon finished in fifth place in Most Valuable Player voting, and also finished in second place in Defensive Player of the Year voting, behind Mark Eaton of the Utah Jazz. The Rockets finished ninth in the NBA in home-game attendance, with an attendance of 680,728 at The Summit during the regular season.

=== NBA playoffs ===
In the Western Conference First Round of the 1989 NBA playoffs, the Rockets faced off against the 4th–seeded Seattle SuperSonics, who were led by All-Star guard Dale Ellis, All-Star forward Xavier McDaniel, and second-year forward Derrick McKey. The Rockets lost the first two games to the SuperSonics on the road at the Seattle Center Coliseum, but managed to win Game 3 at home, 126–107 at The Summit. However, the Rockets lost Game 4 to the SuperSonics at home, 98–96, thus losing the series in four games.

=== Aftermath ===
Following the season, Short signed as a free agent with the New Jersey Nets, while Berry left to play overseas in Italy after only three seasons in the NBA, and Frank Johnson was released to free agency.

== Draft picks ==
Round	Pick	Player	Position	Nationality	College/Club team
1	16	Derrick Chievous	SF	United States	Missouri

== Roster ==
1988–89 Houston Rockets roster
Players

Pos.	No.	Player	Height	Weight	DOB	From
F	6	Walter Berry	6 ft 8 in (2.03 m)	215 lb (98 kg)	1964–05–14	St. John's
F	3	Derrick Chievous	6 ft 7 in (2.01 m)	195 lb (88 kg)	1967–07–03	Missouri
G	21	Sleepy Floyd	6 ft 3 in (1.91 m)	170 lb (77 kg)	1960–03–06	Georgetown
F	1	Buck Johnson	6 ft 7 in (2.01 m)	190 lb (86 kg)	1964–01–03	Alabama
G	15	Frank Johnson	6 ft 1 in (1.85 m)	185 lb (84 kg)	1958–11–23	Wake Forest
G	30	Allen Leavell	6 ft 1 in (1.85 m)	170 lb (77 kg)	1957–05–27	Oklahoma City
C	40	Tim McCormick	6 ft 11 in (2.11 m)	240 lb (109 kg)	1962–03–10	Michigan
C	52	Chuck Nevitt	7 ft 5 in (2.26 m)	217 lb (98 kg)	1959–06–13	NC State
C	34	Akeem Olajuwon	7 ft 0 in (2.13 m)	255 lb (116 kg)	1963–01–21	Houston
F	10	Purvis Short	6 ft 7 in (2.01 m)	210 lb (95 kg)	1957–07–02	Jackson State
F	33	Otis Thorpe	6 ft 9 in (2.06 m)	225 lb (102 kg)	1962–08–05	Providence
G	42	Mike Woodson	6 ft 5 in (1.96 m)	195 lb (88 kg)	1958–03–24	Indiana

Coaches
Head coach
- Don Chaney
Assistant(s)
- Carroll Dawson
- Rudy Tomjanovich

Legend
- (DP) Unsigned draft pick
- (FA) Free agent
- (S) Suspended
- Injured

Roster
Updated: February 16, 1989

== Regular season ==
=== Season standings ===
Midwest Division	W	L	PCT	GB	Home	Road	Div
y-Utah Jazz	51	31	.622	–	34–7	17–24	19–11
x-Houston Rockets	45	37	.549	6	31–10	14–27	19–11
x-Denver Nuggets	44	38	.537	7	35–6	9–32	18–12
Dallas Mavericks	38	44	.463	13	24–17	14–27	19–11
San Antonio Spurs	21	61	.256	30	18–23	3–38	9–21
Miami Heat	15	67	.183	36	12–29	3–38	6–24

#	Western Conference				
#	Team	W	L	PCT	GB
1	c-Los Angeles Lakers	57	25	.695	–
2	y-Utah Jazz	51	31	.622	6
3	x-Phoenix Suns	55	27	.671	2
4	x-Seattle SuperSonics	47	35	.573	10
5	x-Houston Rockets	45	37	.549	12
6	x-Denver Nuggets	44	38	.537	13
7	x-Golden State Warriors	43	39	.524	14
8	x-Portland Trail Blazers	39	43	.476	18
9	Dallas Mavericks	38	44	.463	19
10	Sacramento Kings	27	55	.329	30
11	San Antonio Spurs	21	61	.256	36
12	Los Angeles Clippers	21	61	.256	36
13	Miami Heat	15	67	.183	42

z – clinched division title
y – clinched division title
x – clinched playoff spot

== Game log ==
=== Regular season ===
1988–89 game log
Total: 45–37 (home: 31–10; road: 14–27)
November: 9–6 (home: 6–3; road: 3–3)

Game	Date	Team	Score	High points	High rebounds	High assists	Location Attendance	Record
1	November 4	@ Denver	L 117–120				McNichols Sports Arena	0–1
2	November 5	Dallas	L 113–114 (OT)				The Summit	0–2
3	November 8	San Antonio	W 120–102				The Summit	1–2
4	November 10	Utah	W 106–99				The Summit	2–2
5	November 11	@ Miami	W 121–100				Miami Arena	3–2
6	November 13	Sacramento	W 129–127				The Summit	4–2
7	November 15	New York	L 121–126				The Summit	4–3
8	November 17	Miami	W 113–107				The Summit	5–3
9	November 19	Detroit	W 109–98				The Summit	6–3
10	November 21	Atlanta	W 117–113				The Summit	7–3
11	November 23	@ Utah	L 99–102				Salt Palace	7–4
12	November 25	@ Portland	L 94–111				Memorial Coliseum	7–5
13	November 26	@ Golden State	W 119–109				Oakland-Alameda County Coliseum Arena	8–5
14	November 29	Phoenix	L 107–124				The Summit	8–6
15	November 30	@ Dallas	W 101–89				Reunion Arena	9–6

December: 9–5 (home: 7–0; road: 2–5)

Game	Date	Team	Score	High points	High rebounds	High assists	Location Attendance	Record
16	December 2	@ Phoenix	L 95–110				Arizona Veterans Memorial Coliseum	9–7
17	December 3	Charlotte	W 108–104				The Summit	10–7
18	December 6	Cleveland	W 106–105				The Summit	11–7
19	December 8	@ L.A. Clippers	L 116–120				Los Angeles Memorial Sports Arena	11–8
20	December 10	Seattle	W 110–91				The Summit	12–8
21	December 13	@ Denver	L 101–126				McNichols Sports Arena	12–9
22	December 15	Golden State	W 124–115 (2OT)				The Summit	13–9
23	December 18	San Antonio	W 120–109				The Summit	14–9
24	December 20	Sacramento	W 105–104				The Summit	15–9
25	December 22	L.A. Clippers	W 125–109				The Summit	16–9
26	December 26	@ Charlotte	W 97–95				Charlotte Coliseum	17–9
27	December 27	@ Miami	W 101–93				Miami Arena	18–9
28	December 29	@ Washington	L 109–126				Capital Centre	18–10
29	December 30	@ Detroit	L 83–95				The Palace of Auburn Hills	18–11

January: 7–6 (home: 5–2; road: 2–4)

Game	Date	Team	Score	High points	High rebounds	High assists	Location Attendance	Record
30	January 3	Utah	W 104–102				The Summit	19–11
31	January 7	Philadelphia	L 95–96				The Summit	19–12
32	January 11	@ San Antonio	W 122–117 (OT)				HemisFair Arena	20–12
33	January 12	Portland	W 116–106				The Summit	21–12
34	January 14	Dallas	W 110–98	Olajuwon (29)	Thorpe (11)	Floyd (9)	The Summit; 16,611	22–12
35	January 16	@ L.A. Lakers	L 113–124				Great Western Forum	22–13
36	January 17	@ Sacramento	L 109–123				ARCO Arena	22–14
37	January 19	@ Seattle	L 108–124				Seattle Center Coliseum	22–15
38	January 20	@ Golden State	L 114–121				Oakland-Alameda County Coliseum Arena	22–16
39	January 24	Miami	W 118–93				The Summit	23–16
40	January 26	L.A. Clippers	W 106–100				The Summit	24–16
42	January 28	@ San Antonio	W 96–91				HemisFair Arena	25–17
42	January 31	L.A. Lakers	L 114–125				The Summit	25–17

February: 6–6 (home: 4–1; road: 2–5)

Game	Date	Team	Score	High points	High rebounds	High assists	Location Attendance	Record
43	February 3	Chicago	W 105–98				The Summit	26–17
44	February 5	Denver	W 124–112				The Summit	27–17
45	February 8	@ L.A. Clippers	L 111–114				Los Angeles Memorial Sports Arena	27–18
46	February 9	@ Portland	W 113–110				Memorial Coliseum	28–18
All-Star Break
47	February 14	Boston	W 137–123				The Summit	29–18
48	February 17	Denver	W 121–111				The Summit	30–18
49	February 18	@ Dallas	W 105–94				Reunion Arena	31–18
50	February 20	@ Cleveland	L 90–110				Richfield Coliseum	31–19
51	February 21	@ New York	L 115–120				Madison Square Garden	31–20
52	February 24	@ Chicago	L 97–106				Chicago Stadium	31–21
53	February 25	@ Milwaukee	L 105–121				Bradley Center	31–22
54	February 27	Washington	L 98–104				The Summit	31–23

March: 8–8 (home: 7–2; road: 1–6)

Game	Date	Team	Score	High points	High rebounds	High assists	Location Attendance	Record
55	March 2	@ Denver	L 103–113				McNichols Sports Arena	31–24
56	March 3	@ Seattle	L 108–118				Seattle Center Coliseum	31–25
57	March 5	L.A. Lakers	W 88–83				The Summit	32–25
58	March 8	@ Utah	L 80–117				Salt Palace	32–26
59	March 10	Dallas	W 96–86				The Summit	33–26
60	March 11	New Jersey	W 124–94				The Summit	34–26
61	March 13	@ L.A. Lakers	L 96–97				Great Western Forum	34–27
62	March 14	@ Sacramento	L 90–95				ARCO Arena	34–28
63	March 16	Milwaukee	W 120–104				The Summit	35–28
64	March 18	Portland	W 127–113				The Summit	36–28
65	March 21	Denver	L 110–112				The Summit	36–29
66	March 24	Utah	L 99–102				The Summit	36–30
67	March 25	Golden State	W 144–104				The Summit	37–30
68	March 28	Seattle	W 120–117				The Summit	38–30
69	March 30	@ New Jersey	W 109–101				Brendan Byrne Arena	39–30
70	March 31	@ Boston	L 109–126				Boston Garden	39–31

April: 6–6 (home: 2–2; road: 4–4)

Game	Date	Team	Score	High points	High rebounds	High assists	Location Attendance	Record
71	April 2	@ Philadelphia	L 99–108				The Spectrum	39–32
72	April 4	@ Indiana	W 90–88				Market Square Arena	40–32
73	April 7	@ Atlanta	L 112–120 (OT)				The Omni	40–33
74	April 8	@ Miami	L 104–107 (OT)				Miami Arena	40–34
75	April 11	Indiana	W 108–99				The Summit	41–35
76	April 13	Phoenix	L 111–119				The Summit	41–35
77	April 14	@ Utah	L 96–122				Salt Palace	41–36
78	April 16	@ Dallas	W 114–112 (OT)				Reunion Arena	42–36
79	April 17	San Antonio	W 99–91				The Summit	43–36
80	April 19	@ San Antonio	W 99–84				HemisFair Arena	44–36
81	April 21	@ Phoenix	W 112–101				Arizona Veterans Memorial Coliseum	45–36
82	April 22	Miami	L 89–91				The Summit	45–37

1988–89 schedule

== Playoffs ==
1989 playoff game log
Western Conference First Round: 1–3 (home: 1–1; road: 0–2)

Game	Date	Team	Score	High points	High rebounds	High assists	Location Attendance	Series
1	April 28	@ Seattle	L 107–111	Olajuwon (28)	Olajuwon (9)	Floyd (7)	Seattle Center Coliseum; 14,250	0–1
2	April 30	@ Seattle	L 97–109	Olajuwon (30)	Olajuwon (12)	Floyd (6)	Seattle Center Coliseum; 12,887	0–2
3	May 3	Seattle	W 126–107	Floyd (28)	Olajuwon (18)	Floyd (6)	The Summit; 16,611	1–2
4	May 5	Seattle	L 96–98	Olajuwon (24)	Olajuwon (13)	Floyd, Woodson (7)	The Summit; 16,611	1–3

1989 schedule

== Player statistics ==
Legend
GP	Games played	GS	Games started	MPG	Minutes per game
FG%	Field-goal percentage	3P%	3-point field-goal percentage	FT%	Free-throw percentage
RPG	Rebounds per game	APG	Assists per game	SPG	Steals per game
BPG	Blocks per game	PPG	Points per game

=== Season ===
Player	GP	GS	MPG	FG%	3FG%	FT%	RPG	APG	SPG	BPG	PPG

=== Playoffs ===
Player	GP	GS	MPG	FG%	3FG%	FT%	RPG	APG	SPG	BPG	PPG

== Awards and records ==
- Akeem Olajuwon, All-NBA First Team

== See also ==
- 1988–89 NBA season
