= Rob Lock =

American basketball player (born 1966)

Personal information
- Born: May 22, 1966 (age 60) Reedley, California
- Listed height: 6 ft 9 in (2.06 m)
- Listed weight: 225 lb (102 kg)

Career information
- High school: Reedley (Reedley, California)
- College: Kentucky (1984–1988)
- NBA draft: 1988: 3rd round, 51st overall pick
- Drafted by: Los Angeles Clippers
- Playing career: 1988–1996
- Position: Power forward
- Number: 44

Career history
- 1988–1989: Standa Reggio Calabria
- 1989: Los Angeles Clippers
- 1990–1992: Pallacanestro Pavia
- 1992–1993: Telemarket Forlì
- 1993–1994: Bialetti Montecatini
- 1994: CSP Limoges
- 1994–1996: Valvi Girona

Career highlights
- Third-team Parade All-American (1984)
- Stats at NBA.com
- Stats at Basketball Reference

Robert Alan Lock (born May 22, 1966) is an American former professional basketball player. Lock was born and raised in Reedley, California and played collegiate ball with the University of Kentucky (1984–1988) where he was a solid contributor off the bench and increased his stats every year he played. He entered the 1988 NBA draft and was picked 51st in the third round by the Los Angeles Clippers; however, Lock accepted an offer to play in Italy instead. He did eventually return to play for just 20 games with Clippers during the latter part of the 1988-89 NBA season.

After retiring from basketball, Lock pursued his childhood dream of becoming a pilot. He is currently the owner of Waldo Wright's Flying Service where he gives open cockpit rides to visitors in restored vintage biplanes. The family business is based in Polk City, Florida and is currently the largest provider of open cockpit flights.

== Career statistics ==
Legend
GP	Games played	GS	Games started	MPG	Minutes per game
FG%	Field goal percentage	3P%	3-point field goal percentage	FT%	Free throw percentage
RPG	Rebounds per game	APG	Assists per game	SPG	Steals per game
BPG	Blocks per game	PPG	Points per game	**Bold**	Career high

=== NBA ===
==== Regular season ====
Year	Team	GP	GS	MPG	FG%	3P%	FT%	RPG	APG	SPG	BPG	PPG
1988–89	L.A. Clippers	20	0	5.5	.281	–	.800	1.6	.2	.2	.2	1.5
