= 1988–89 Denver Nuggets season =

NBA professional basketball team season

- Head coach: Doug Moe
- Arena: McNichols Sports Arena

Results
- Record: 44–38 (.537)
- Place: Division: 3rd (Midwest); Conference: 6th (Western)
- Playoff finish: West First Round (lost to Suns 0–3)
- Stats at Basketball Reference

Local media
- Television: KTVD; KMGH-TV; Prime Sports Rocky Mountain (Dan Issel, Irv Brown)
- Radio: KOA

The 1988–89 Denver Nuggets season was the 13th season for the Denver Nuggets in the National Basketball Association, and their 22nd season as a franchise.

== Season summary ==
=== Off-season ===
The Nuggets had the 23rd overall pick in the 1988 NBA draft, and selected power forward Jerome Lane from the University of Pittsburgh. During the off-season, the team signed free agents, All-Star guard Walter Davis, and Elston Turner.

=== Regular season ===
With the addition of Davis and Turner, the Nuggets got off to an 11–4 start to the regular season, but then lost 16 of their next 25 games, and later on held a 25–23 record at the All-Star break. At mid-season, the team traded Jay Vincent, and Calvin Natt to the San Antonio Spurs in exchange for Dave Greenwood, and Darwin Cook. Despite losing six of their final eight games of the season, the Nuggets finished in third place in the Midwest Division with a 44–38 record, and earned the sixth seed in the Western Conference; the team also posted a very successful 35–6 home record at the McNichols Sports Arena during the regular season, and qualified for the NBA playoffs for the eighth consecutive year.

Alex English averaged 26.5 points and 4.7 assists per game, while Fat Lever averaged 19.8 points, 9.3 rebounds, 7.9 assists and 2.7 steals per game, and Michael Adams provided the team with 18.5 points, 6.4 assists and 2.2 steals per game, and also led the league with 166 three-point field goals. In addition, Davis played a sixth man role off the bench, and contributed 15.6 points per game, while Danny Schayes provided with 12.8 points and 6.6 rebounds per game, Blair Rasmussen contributed 7.6 points and 3.7 rebounds per game, and Wayne Cooper averaged 6.6 points, 7.8 rebounds and 2.7 blocks per game. Meanwhile, Bill Hanzlik contributed 4.9 points per game, but only played just 41 games due to a back injury, and Turner provided with 4.3 points and 3.7 rebounds per game.

During the NBA All-Star weekend at the Houston Astrodome in Houston, Texas, English was selected for the 1989 NBA All-Star Game, as a member of the Western Conference All-Star team; it was his final All-Star appearance. Meanwhile, Adams participated in the NBA Three-Point Shootout. Lever finished tied in seventh place in Defensive Player of the Year voting. The Nuggets finished 16th in the NBA in home-game attendance, with an attendance of 527,337 at the McNichols Sports Arena during the regular season.

=== NBA playoffs ===
In the Western Conference First Round of the 1989 NBA playoffs, the Nuggets faced off against the 3rd–seeded Phoenix Suns, who were led by the trio of All-Star forward Tom Chambers, Sixth Man of the Year, Eddie Johnson, and second-year star, and Most Improved Player of the Year, Kevin Johnson. However, due to injuries to Lever (thigh bruise), Adams (hamstring), and Schayes (sprained ankle), the Nuggets lost the first two games to the Suns on the road at the Arizona Veterans Memorial Coliseum, before losing Game 3 at home, 130–121 at the McNichols Sports Arena, thus losing the series in a three-game sweep.

=== Aftermath ===
Following the season, Cooper signed as a free agent with the Portland Trail Blazers, and Turner, Greenwood and Cook were all released to free agency.

== Draft picks ==
Round	Pick	Player	Position	Nationality	School/Club team
1	23	Jerome Lane	PF/SF	United States	Pittsburgh
2	43	Todd Mitchell	F	United States	Purdue
2	47	Vernon Maxwell	SG	United States	Florida
3	66	Dwight Boyd		United States	Memphis

== Roster ==
1988–89 Denver Nuggets roster
Players

Pos.	No.	Player	Height	Weight	DOB	From
G	14	Michael Adams	5 ft 10 in (1.78 m)	162 lb (73 kg)	1963–01–19	Boston College
G	1	Darwin Cook	6 ft 3 in (1.91 m)	184 lb (83 kg)	1958–08–06	Portland
C	42	Wayne Cooper	6 ft 10 in (2.08 m)	220 lb (100 kg)	1956–11–16	LSU New Orleans
G/F	6	Walter Davis	6 ft 6 in (1.98 m)	193 lb (88 kg)	1954–09–09	North Carolina
F	43	Wayne Engelstad	6 ft 8 in (2.03 m)	245 lb (111 kg)	1965–12–06	UC Irvine
F	2	Alex English	6 ft 7 in (2.01 m)	190 lb (86 kg)	1954–01–05	South Carolina
F	22	Dave Greenwood	6 ft 9 in (2.06 m)	222 lb (101 kg)	1957–05–27	UCLA
F	24	Bill Hanzlik	6 ft 7 in (2.01 m)	185 lb (84 kg)	1957–12–06	Notre Dame
G	15	Eddie Hughes	5 ft 10 in (1.78 m)	165 lb (75 kg)	1960–05–26	Colorado State
F	35	Jerome Lane	6 ft 6 in (1.98 m)	230 lb (104 kg)	1966–12–04	Pittsburgh
G	12	Fat Lever	6 ft 3 in (1.91 m)	170 lb (77 kg)	1960–08–18	Arizona State
C	41	Blair Rasmussen	7 ft 0 in (2.13 m)	250 lb (113 kg)	1962–11–13	Oregon
C	34	Danny Schayes	6 ft 11 in (2.11 m)	235 lb (107 kg)	1959–05–10	Syracuse

Coaches
Head coach
- Doug Moe
Assistant(s)
- Allan Bristow
- Doug Moe Jr.

Legend
- (DP) Unsigned draft pick
- (FA) Free agent
- (S) Suspended
- Injured

== Regular season ==
=== Season standings ===
Midwest Division	W	L	PCT	GB	Home	Road	Div
y-Utah Jazz	51	31	.622	–	34–7	17–24	19–11
x-Houston Rockets	45	37	.549	6	31–10	14–27	19–11
x-Denver Nuggets	44	38	.537	7	35–6	9–32	18–12
Dallas Mavericks	38	44	.463	13	24–17	14–27	19–11
San Antonio Spurs	21	61	.256	30	18–23	3–38	9–21
Miami Heat	15	67	.183	36	12–29	3–38	6–24

#	Western Conference				
#	Team	W	L	PCT	GB
1	c-Los Angeles Lakers	57	25	.695	–
2	y-Utah Jazz	51	31	.622	6
3	x-Phoenix Suns	55	27	.671	2
4	x-Seattle SuperSonics	47	35	.573	10
5	x-Houston Rockets	45	37	.549	12
6	x-Denver Nuggets	44	38	.537	13
7	x-Golden State Warriors	43	39	.524	14
8	x-Portland Trail Blazers	39	43	.476	18
9	Dallas Mavericks	38	44	.463	19
10	Sacramento Kings	27	55	.329	30
11	San Antonio Spurs	21	61	.256	36
12	Los Angeles Clippers	21	61	.256	36
13	Miami Heat	15	67	.183	42

z - clinched division title
y - clinched division title
x - clinched playoff spot

== Playoffs ==
1989 playoff game log
First round: 0–3 (home: 0–1; road: 0–2)

Game	Date	Team	Score	High points	High rebounds	High assists	Location Attendance	Series
1	April 28	@ Phoenix	L 103–104	Walter Davis (34)	Fat Lever (12)	Fat Lever (17)	Arizona Veterans Memorial Coliseum; 14,471	0–1
2	April 30	@ Phoenix	L 114–132	Alex English (36)	Michael Adams (12)	English, Cook (6)	Arizona Veterans Memorial Coliseum; 14,471	0–2
3	May 2	Phoenix	L 121–130	Walter Davis (26)	Elston Turner (7)	Bill Hanzlik (6)	McNichols Sports Arena; 12,660	0–3

1989 schedule

== Player statistics ==
Legend
GP	Games played	GS	Games started	MPG	Minutes per game
FG%	Field-goal percentage	3P%	3-point field-goal percentage	FT%	Free-throw percentage
RPG	Rebounds per game	APG	Assists per game	SPG	Steals per game
BPG	Blocks per game	PPG	Points per game

=== Season ===
Player	GP	GS	MPG	FG%	3FG%	FT%	RPG	APG	SPG	BPG	PPG

=== Playoffs ===
Player	GP	GS	MPG	FG%	3FG%	FT%	RPG	APG	SPG	BPG	PPG

== See also ==
- 1988-89 NBA season
