= 1988–89 New Jersey Nets season =

NBA professional basketball team season

- Head coach: Willis Reed
- General manager: Harry Weltman
- Arena: Brendan Byrne Arena

Results
- Record: 26–56 (.317)
- Place: Division: 5th (Atlantic); Conference: 11th (Eastern)
- Playoff finish: Did not qualify
- Stats at Basketball Reference

Local media
- Television: WWOR-TV; SportsChannel New York
- Radio: WNEW

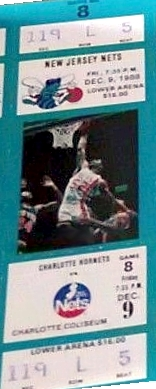
A ticket for a December 1988 game between the Nets and the Charlotte Hornets.

The 1988–89 New Jersey Nets season was the Nets' 13th season in the National Basketball Association, and also their 13th season in East Rutherford, New Jersey.

== Season summary ==
=== Off-season ===
The Nets received the fourth overall pick in the 1988 NBA draft, and selected small forward Chris Morris from the University of Auburn. During the off-season, the team acquired Walter Berry from the San Antonio Spurs, and acquired Mike McGee from the Sacramento Kings. Before the start of the regular season, the Nets acquired former All-Star center Joe Barry Carroll, and Lester Conner from the Houston Rockets.

=== Regular season ===
With the addition of Morris, Barry Carroll, McGee and Conner, the Nets played around .500 in winning percentage with a 7–7 start to the regular season, but then posted a six-game losing streak between November and December afterwards, and later on held an 18–29 record at the All-Star break. In January, Berry was released to free agency and signed with the Rockets at mid-season; he averaged 8.9 points and 4.0 rebounds per game in 29 games with the Nets. The Nets struggled posting a 10-game losing streak in March, and lost 20 of their final 23 games of the season, finishing in fifth place in the Atlantic Division with a 26–56 record.

Roy Hinson averaged 16.0 points, 6.4 rebounds and 1.5 blocks per game, while Morris averaged 14.1 points, 5.2 rebounds and 1.3 steals per game, and was named to the NBA All-Rookie Second Team, and Barry Carroll provided the team with 14.1 points, 7.4 rebounds and 1.3 blocks per game. In addition, Buck Williams provided with 13.0 points and 9.4 rebounds per game, while McGee contributed 13.0 points per game and led the Nets with 93 three-point field goals, and second-year guard Dennis Hopson provided with 12.7 points per game. Meanwhile, Conner replaced John Bagley as the Nets' starting point guard during the regular season, as he averaged 10.3 points, 7.4 assists and 2.2 steals per game, while Bagley contributed 7.4 points and 5.8 assists per game, and Keith Lee provided with 4.8 points and 4.5 rebounds per game.

During the NBA All-Star weekend at the Houston Astrodome in Houston, Texas, Morris participated in the NBA Slam Dunk Contest. Morris also finished in third place in Rookie of the Year voting, while Williams finished tied in seventh place in Defensive Player of the Year voting. The Nets finished 21st in the NBA in home-game attendance, with an attendance of 378,397 at the Brendan Byrne Arena during the regular season, which was the fifth-lowest in the league.

=== Aftermath ===
Following the season, Williams was traded to the Portland Trail Blazers after eight seasons with the Nets, while McGee was released to free agency, Bagley was traded to the Boston Celtics, and Lee was left unprotected in the 1989 NBA expansion draft, where he was selected by the Orlando Magic expansion team.

== Draft picks ==
Round	Pick	Player	Position	Nationality	College
1	4	Chris Morris	SF	United States	Auburn
2	32	Charles Shackleford	PF/C	United States	North Carolina State
3	52	Derrick Hamilton	SF	United States	Southern Mississippi

== Roster ==
1988–89 New Jersey Nets roster
Players

Pos.	No.	Player	Height	Weight	DOB	From
G	5	John Bagley	6 ft 0 in (1.83 m)	185 lb (84 kg)	1960-04-23	Boston College
C	11	Joe Barry Carroll	7 ft 0 in (2.13 m)	225 lb (102 kg)	1958-07-24	Purdue
G	15	Lester Conner	6 ft 4 in (1.93 m)	180 lb (82 kg)	1959-09-17	Oregon State
G	12	Corey Gaines	6 ft 3 in (1.91 m)	195 lb (88 kg)	1965-06-01	Loyola Marymount
F	23	Roy Hinson	6 ft 9 in (2.06 m)	210 lb (95 kg)	1961-05-02	Rutgers
G	2	Dennis Hopson	6 ft 5 in (1.96 m)	200 lb (91 kg)	1965-04-22	Ohio State
F	20	Bill Jones	6 ft 7 in (2.01 m)	175 lb (79 kg)	1966-03-18	Iowa
F	24	Keith Lee	6 ft 10 in (2.08 m)	215 lb (98 kg)	1962-12-28	Memphis
G	22	Mike McGee	6 ft 5 in (1.96 m)	190 lb (86 kg)	1959-07-29	Michigan
F	34	Chris Morris	6 ft 8 in (2.03 m)	210 lb (95 kg)	1966-01-20	Auburn
C	33	Charles Shackleford	6 ft 10 in (2.08 m)	225 lb (102 kg)	1966-04-22	NC State
F	52	Buck Williams	6 ft 8 in (2.03 m)	215 lb (98 kg)	1960-03-08	Maryland

Coaches
Head coach
- Willis Reed
Assistant(s)
- Butch Beard
- Lee Rose
- Paul Silas

Legend
- (DP) Unsigned draft pick
- (FA) Free agent
- (S) Suspended
- Injured

Roster

== Regular season ==
=== Season standings ===
Atlantic Division	W	L	PCT	GB	Home	Road	Div
y-New York Knicks	52	30	.634	–	35–6	17–24	18–12
x-Philadelphia 76ers	46	36	.561	6	30–11	16–25	19–11
x-Boston Celtics	42	40	.512	10	32–9	10–31	19–11
Washington Bullets	40	42	.488	12	30–11	10–31	17–13
New Jersey Nets	26	56	.317	26	17–24	9–32	9–21
Charlotte Hornets	20	62	.244	32	12–29	8–33	8–22

#	Eastern Conference				
#	Team	W	L	PCT	GB
1	z-Detroit Pistons	63	19	.768	–
2	y-New York Knicks	52	30	.634	11
3	x-Cleveland Cavaliers	57	25	.695	6
4	x-Atlanta Hawks	52	30	.634	11
5	x-Milwaukee Bucks	49	33	.598	14
6	x-Chicago Bulls	47	35	.573	16
7	x-Philadelphia 76ers	46	36	.561	17
8	x-Boston Celtics	42	40	.512	21
9	Washington Bullets	40	42	.488	23
10	Indiana Pacers	28	54	.341	35
11	New Jersey Nets	26	56	.317	37
12	Charlotte Hornets	20	62	.244	43

z – clinched division title
y – clinched division title
x – clinched playoff spot

== Awards and records ==
- Chris Morris, NBA All-Rookie Team 2nd Team

== Transactions ==
- June 23, 1988: Dwayne Washington drafted in the NBA expansion draft by the Miami Heat.
- July 1, 1988: Released Dudley Bradley.
- July 19, 1988: Signed Anthony Bowie as a free agent.
- August 10, 1988: Orlando Woolridge signed as an unrestricted free agent with the Los Angeles Lakers.
- August 29, 1988: Traded Dallas Comegys to the San Antonio Spurs for Walter Berry.
- August 30, 1988: Signed Kevin Williams as a free agent.
- August 31, 1988: Waived Otis Birdsong.
- October 4, 1988: Signed Frank Johnson as a free agent.
- October 31, 1988: Traded a 1991 2nd round draft pick and a 1996 2nd round draft pick to the Sacramento Kings for Mike McGee.
- November 1, 1988: Waived Anthony Bowie.
- November 2, 1988: Traded Tony Brown, Frank Johnson, Tim McCormick and Lorenzo Romar to the Houston Rockets for Joe Barry Carroll and Lester Conner.
- November 23, 1988: Signed Ron Cavenall as a free agent.
- December 27, 1988: Waived Ron Cavenall.
- January 30, 1989: Waived Walter Berry.
- January 31, 1989: Signed Bill Jones as a free agent.
- February 7, 1989: Signed Corey Gaines to the first of two 10-day contracts.
- February 27, 1989: Signed Corey Gaines as a free agent.
- March 3, 1989: Waived Kevin Williams.

Player Transactions Citation:
