= 1988–89 Los Angeles Clippers season =

NBA professional basketball team season

- Head coach: Gene Shue (fired); Don Casey
- General manager: Elgin Baylor
- Owner: Donald Sterling
- Arena: Los Angeles Memorial Sports Arena

Results
- Record: 21–61 (.256)
- Place: Division: 7th (Pacific); Conference: 12th (Western)
- Playoff finish: Did not qualify
- Stats at Basketball Reference

Local media
- Television: KTLA; Z Channel (Ralph Lawler, Kevin Loughery, Keith Erickson)
- Radio: KRLA (Ralph Lawler, Kevin Loughery, Keith Erickson, Pete Arbogast)

The 1988–89 Los Angeles Clippers season was the 19th season for the Los Angeles Clippers in the National Basketball Association, and their fifth season in Los Angeles, California.

== Season summary ==
=== Off-season ===
The Clippers won the NBA draft lottery, and selected power forward Danny Manning from the University of Kansas with the first overall pick in the 1988 NBA draft; the team also selected shooting guard Hersey Hawkins out of Bradley University with the sixth overall pick. However, the Clippers soon traded Hawkins to the Philadelphia 76ers in exchange for rookie power forward, and first-round draft pick Charles D. Smith from the University of Pittsburgh; the team also acquired rookie point guard, and first-round draft pick Gary Grant out of the University of Michigan from the Seattle SuperSonics on draft day.

For the season, the Clippers slightly updated their road uniforms, changing the color of their jersey number from blue to white; these uniforms only lasted for just one season.

=== Regular season ===
With the addition of Manning, Smith and Grant, the Clippers played around .500 in winning percentage with a 6–6 start to the regular season, but soon struggled losing 11 of their next 13 games. In January, Manning suffered a right knee injury after only just 26 games, and was out for the remainder of the season, as the team suffered a dreadful 19-game losing streak between December and February, which included a winless month in January. Head coach Gene Shue was fired after a 10–28 start to the season, and was replaced with assistant coach Don Casey. The Clippers held an 11–37 record at the All-Star break, and posted a 13-game losing streak between February and March, losing 32 of 33 games between December 30, 1988, and March 7, 1989. The Clippers finished in last place in the Pacific Division with a 21–61 record, and missed the NBA playoffs for the 13th consecutive year.

Second-year forward Ken Norman showed improvement, averaging 18.1 points, 8.3 rebounds, 3.5 assists and 1.3 steals per game, while Manning averaged 16.7 points, 6.6 rebounds and 1.7 steals per game, and Benoit Benjamin provided the team with 16.4 points, 8.8 rebounds and 2.8 blocks per game. In addition, Smith provided with 16.3 points, 6.5 rebounds and 1.3 blocks per game, and was named to the NBA All-Rookie First Team, while Quintin Dailey contributed 16.1 points and 1.3 steals per game, and Grant contributed 11.9 points, 7.1 assists and 2.0 steals per game. Meanwhile, second-year forward Reggie Williams averaged 10.2 points and 1.3 steals per game, Norm Nixon averaged 6.8 points and 6.4 assists per game in 53 games, rookie point guard, and second-round draft pick Tom Garrick contributed 6.4 points and 3.4 assists per game, and second-year forward Joe Wolf provided with 5.8 points and 4.1 rebounds per game.

Norman finished tied in fourth place in Most Improved Player voting. The Clippers finished 24th in the NBA in home-game attendance, with an attendance of 286,614 at the Los Angeles Memorial Sports Arena during the regular season, which was the second-lowest in the league.

=== Aftermath ===
Following the season, Dailey was released to free agency and signed with the Seattle SuperSonics during the next season, and Nixon retired.

== Draft picks ==
Round	Pick	Player	Position	Nationality	College
1	1	Danny Manning	PF	United States	Kansas
1	6	Hersey Hawkins	SG	United States	Bradley
2	45	Tom Garrick	G	United States	Rhode Island
3	51	Rob Lock	F	United States	Kentucky

== Roster ==
1988–89 Los Angeles Clippers roster
Players

Pos.	No.	Player	Height	Weight	DOB	From
F/C	51	Ken Bannister	6 ft 9 in (2.06 m)	235 lb (107 kg)	––	St. Augustine's
C	00	Benoit Benjamin	7 ft 0 in (2.13 m)	250 lb (113 kg)	––	Creighton
G	20	Quintin Dailey	6 ft 3 in (1.91 m)	180 lb (82 kg)	––	San Francisco
G	22	Tom Garrick	6 ft 2 in (1.88 m)	185 lb (84 kg)	––	Rhode Island
G	3	Grant Gondrezick	6 ft 5 in (1.96 m)	205 lb (93 kg)	––	Pepperdine
G	23	Gary Grant	6 ft 3 in (1.91 m)	185 lb (84 kg)	––	Michigan
F	44	Rob Lock	6 ft 10 in (2.08 m)	255 lb (116 kg)	––	Kentucky
F/C	25	Danny Manning (injured)	6 ft 10 in (2.08 m)	230 lb (104 kg)	––	Kansas
G	10	Norm Nixon	6 ft 2 in (1.88 m)	170 lb (77 kg)	––	Duquesne
F	33	Ken Norman	6 ft 8 in (2.03 m)	215 lb (98 kg)	––	Illinois
F/C	54	Charles D. Smith	6 ft 10 in (2.08 m)	230 lb (104 kg)	––	Pittsburgh
F	31	Eric White	6 ft 8 in (2.03 m)	200 lb (91 kg)	––	Pepperdine
G	42	Kevin Williams	6 ft 2 in (1.88 m)	180 lb (82 kg)	––	St. John's
F	34	Reggie Williams	6 ft 7 in (2.01 m)	190 lb (86 kg)	––	Georgetown
C	24	Joe Wolf	6 ft 11 in (2.11 m)	230 lb (104 kg)	––	North Carolina

Coaches
Head coach
- Gene Shue (fired)
- Don Casey
Assistant(s)
- Jim Eyen

Legend
- (DP) Unsigned draft pick
- (FA) Free agent
- (S) Suspended
- Injured

=== Roster notes ===
- This is forward Eric White's second tour of duty with the franchise after playing briefly for the Utah Jazz. He previously played for the team in March and April in 1988.

== Regular season ==
=== Season standings ===
Pacific Division	W	L	PCT	GB	Home	Road	Div
y-Los Angeles Lakers	57	25	.695	–	35–6	22–19	25–9
x-Phoenix Suns	55	27	.671	2	35–6	20–21	23–11
x-Seattle SuperSonics	47	35	.573	10	31–10	16–25	20–14
x-Golden State Warriors	43	39	.524	14	29–12	14–27	15–19
x-Portland Trail Blazers	39	43	.476	18	28–13	11–30	17–17
Sacramento Kings	27	55	.329	30	21–20	6–35	12–22
Los Angeles Clippers	21	61	.256	36	17–24	4–37	7–27

#	Western Conference				
#	Team	W	L	PCT	GB
1	c-Los Angeles Lakers	57	25	.695	–
2	y-Utah Jazz	51	31	.622	6
3	x-Phoenix Suns	55	27	.671	2
4	x-Seattle SuperSonics	47	35	.573	10
5	x-Houston Rockets	45	37	.549	12
6	x-Denver Nuggets	44	38	.537	13
7	x-Golden State Warriors	43	39	.524	14
8	x-Portland Trail Blazers	39	43	.476	18
9	Dallas Mavericks	38	44	.463	19
10	Sacramento Kings	27	55	.329	30
11	San Antonio Spurs	21	61	.256	36
12	Los Angeles Clippers	21	61	.256	36
13	Miami Heat	15	67	.183	42

z - clinched division title
y - clinched division title
x - clinched playoff spot

== Player statistics ==
Legend
GP	Games played	GS	Games started	MPG	Minutes per game
FG%	Field-goal percentage	3P%	3-point field-goal percentage	FT%	Free-throw percentage
RPG	Rebounds per game	APG	Assists per game	SPG	Steals per game
BPG	Blocks per game	PPG	Points per game

Player	GP	GS	MPG	FG%	3FG%	FT%	RPG	APG	SPG	BPG	PPG
Ken Bannister											
Benoit Benjamin											
Quintin Dailey											
Tom Garrick											
Grant Gondrezick											
Gary Grant											
Greg Kite											
Rob Lock											
Danny Manning											
Norm Nixon											
Ken Norman											
Dave Popson											
Rob Rose											
Charles Smith											
Barry Sumpter											
Ennis Whatley											
Eric White											
Kevin Williams											
Reggie Williams											
Joe Wolf											

== Awards and records ==
- Charles Smith, NBA All-Rookie Team 1st Team

== Transactions ==
The Clippers were involved in the following transactions during the 1988–89 season.

=== Trades ===
June 28, 1988
June 28, 1988
To Los Angeles Clippers

- Draft rights to Gary Grant
To Los Angeles Clippers

- Draft rights to Charles Smith
To Seattle SuperSonics

- Michael Cage
To Philadelphia 76ers

- Draft rights to Hersey Hawkins

=== Free agents ===
==== Additions ==== : Player / Signed / Former team	==== Subtractions ==== : Player / Left / New team

Player Transactions Citation:
