= 1988–89 Sacramento Kings season =

NBA professional basketball team season

- Head coach: Jerry Reynolds
- General manager: Bill Russell
- Owners: Joseph Benvenuti; Gregg Lukenbill
- Arena: ARCO Arena

Results
- Record: 27–55 (.329)
- Place: Division: 6th (Pacific); Conference: 10th (Western)
- Playoff finish: Did not qualify
- Stats at Basketball Reference

Local media
- Television: KRBK-TV (Grant Napear, Derrek Dickey)
- Radio: KFBK (Gary Gerould)

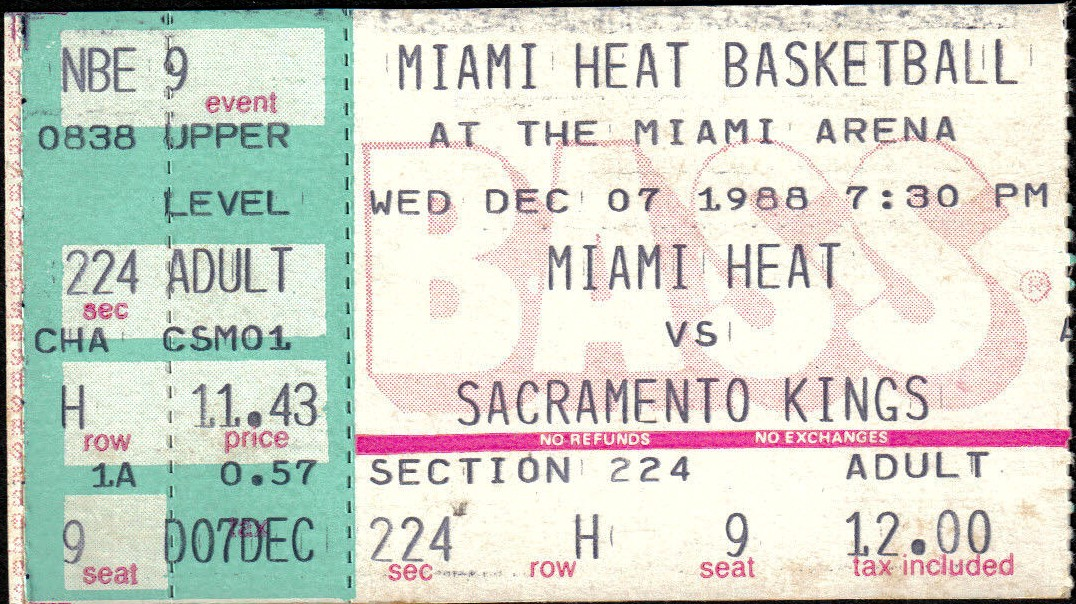
A ticket for a December 1988 game between the Kings and the Miami Heat.

The 1988–89 Sacramento Kings season was the 40th season for the Sacramento Kings in the National Basketball Association, and their fourth season in Sacramento, California.

== Season summary ==
=== Off-season ===
After playing the previous three seasons at the original ARCO Arena, the Kings moved into their new arena, the new ARCO Arena, also known as "ARCO Arena II". In addition, after previously playing in the Midwest Division of the NBA's Western Conference, the team moved into the Pacific Division this season.

The Kings received the 18th overall pick in the 1988 NBA draft from the Atlanta Hawks via trade, and selected small forward Ricky Berry out of San Jose State University; the team also selected shooting guard Vinny Del Negro out of North Carolina State University with the 29th overall pick. During the off-season, the team acquired Rodney McCray and Jim Petersen from the Houston Rockets, and also acquired Randy Wittman from the Hawks before draft day.

=== Regular season ===
With the addition of McCray, Peterson and Berry, the Kings struggled losing their first seven games of the regular season. The team got off to a 3–14 start to the season, posted a six-game losing streak between January and February, and held a 14–32 record at the All-Star break. At mid-season, the team traded Ed Pinckney, and Joe Kleine to the Boston Celtics in exchange for Danny Ainge, and second-year forward Brad Lohaus, and traded Wittman, and LaSalle Thompson to the Indiana Pacers in exchange for Wayman Tisdale. The team also released Derek Smith to free agency, as he soon signed with the Philadelphia 76ers. Before the trades, Thompson averaged 15.0 points, 9.1 rebounds and 1.3 blocks per game in 43 games, while Pinckney averaged 12.3 points and 5.9 rebounds per game in 51 games, and Kleine provided with 6.7 points and 5.1 rebounds per game in 47 games; before he was released, Smith contributed 10.0 points per game in 29 games. The Kings posted another six-game losing streak in February, but managed to win five of their final eight games of the season, finishing in sixth place in the Pacific Division with a 27–55 record.

Ainge averaged 20.3 points, 6.7 assists and 1.5 steals per game in 28 games after the trade, while Tisdale averaged 19.8 points and 9.6 rebounds per game in 31 games, and second-year guard Kenny Smith provided the team with 17.3 points, 7.7 assists and 1.3 steals per game. In addition, McCray provided with 12.6 points, 7.6 rebounds and 4.3 assists per game, while Harold Pressley contributed 12.3 points and 6.1 rebounds per game, and led the Kings with 119 three-point field goals, and Berry contributed 11.0 points per game. Meanwhile, Petersen averaged 10.2 points and 6.3 rebounds per game, Lohaus provided with 8.0 points and 3.9 rebounds per game in 29 games, and Del Negro contributed 7.1 points and 2.6 assists per game.

The Kings finished tenth in the NBA in home-game attendance, with an attendance of 677,197 at the ARCO Arena II during the regular season.

=== Aftermath ===
Following the season, Petersen was traded to the Golden State Warriors, and Lohaus was left unprotected in the 1989 NBA expansion draft, where he was selected by the Minnesota Timberwolves expansion team.

== Draft picks ==
Round	Pick	Player	Position	Nationality	College
1	18	Ricky Berry	SG/SF	United States	San Jose State
2	29	Vinny Del Negro	SG/PG	United States	North Carolina State

== Roster ==
1988–89 Sacramento Kings roster
Players

Pos.	No.	Player	Height	Weight	DOB	From
G	7	Danny Ainge	6 ft 4 in (1.93 m)	175 lb (79 kg)	1959–03–17	BYU
G	33	Randy Allen	6 ft 8 in (2.03 m)	220 lb (100 kg)	1965–01–26	Florida State
G/F	34	Ricky Berry	6 ft 8 in (2.03 m)	205 lb (93 kg)	1964–10–06	San José State
G	15	Vinny Del Negro	6 ft 4 in (1.93 m)	185 lb (84 kg)	1966–08–09	NC State
C	50	Ben Gillery	7 ft 0 in (2.13 m)	235 lb (107 kg)	1965–09–19	Georgetown
G	2	Michael Jackson	6 ft 2 in (1.88 m)	183 lb (83 kg)	1964–07–13	Georgetown
F	54	Brad Lohaus	6 ft 11 in (2.11 m)	230 lb (104 kg)	1964–09–29	Iowa
F	22	Rodney McCray	6 ft 7 in (2.01 m)	220 lb (100 kg)	1961–08–29	Louisville
C	43	Jim Petersen	6 ft 10 in (2.08 m)	235 lb (107 kg)	1962–02–22	Minnesota
F	21	Harold Pressley	6 ft 7 in (2.01 m)	210 lb (95 kg)	1963–07–14	Villanova
G	30	Kenny Smith	6 ft 3 in (1.91 m)	170 lb (77 kg)	1965–03–08	North Carolina
F	23	Wayman Tisdale	6 ft 9 in (2.06 m)	240 lb (109 kg)	1964–06–09	Oklahoma

Coaches
Head coach
- Jerry Reynolds
Assistant(s)
- Ed Gregory
- Herman Kull

Legend
- (DP) Unsigned draft pick
- (FA) Free agent
- (S) Suspended
- Injured

== Regular season ==
=== Season standings ===
Pacific Division	W	L	PCT	GB	Home	Road	Div
y-Los Angeles Lakers	57	25	.695	–	35–6	22–19	25–9
x-Phoenix Suns	55	27	.671	2	35–6	20–21	23–11
x-Seattle SuperSonics	47	35	.573	10	31–10	16–25	20–14
x-Golden State Warriors	43	39	.524	14	29–12	14–27	15–19
x-Portland Trail Blazers	39	43	.476	18	28–13	11–30	17–17
Sacramento Kings	27	55	.329	30	21–20	6–35	12–22
Los Angeles Clippers	21	61	.256	36	17–24	4–37	7–27

#	Western Conference				
#	Team	W	L	PCT	GB
1	c-Los Angeles Lakers	57	25	.695	–
2	y-Utah Jazz	51	31	.622	6
3	x-Phoenix Suns	55	27	.671	2
4	x-Seattle SuperSonics	47	35	.573	10
5	x-Houston Rockets	45	37	.549	12
6	x-Denver Nuggets	44	38	.537	13
7	x-Golden State Warriors	43	39	.524	14
8	x-Portland Trail Blazers	39	43	.476	18
9	Dallas Mavericks	38	44	.463	19
10	Sacramento Kings	27	55	.329	30
11	San Antonio Spurs	21	61	.256	36
12	Los Angeles Clippers	21	61	.256	36
13	Miami Heat	15	67	.183	42

z - clinched division title
y - clinched division title
x - clinched playoff spot

== Player statistics ==
Legend
GP	Games played	GS	Games started	MPG	Minutes per game
FG%	Field-goal percentage	3P%	3-point field-goal percentage	FT%	Free-throw percentage
RPG	Rebounds per game	APG	Assists per game	SPG	Steals per game
BPG	Blocks per game	PPG	Points per game

Player	GP	GS	MPG	FG%	3FG%	FT%	RPG	APG	SPG	BPG	PPG

== Transactions ==
=== Trades ===
June 27, 1988	To Sacramento Kings Randy Wittman; 1988 1st round pick	To Atlanta Hawks Reggie Theus; 1988 3rd round pick
October 11, 1988	To Sacramento Kings Rodney McCray; Jim Petersen	To Houston Rockets Otis Thorpe
October 31, 1988	To Sacramento Kings 1991 2nd round pick 1996 2nd round pick	To New Jersey Nets Mike McGee
February 20, 1989	To Sacramento Kings Wayman Tisdale; 1990 2nd round pick	To Indiana Pacers LaSalle Thompson; Randy Wittman
February 23, 1989	To Sacramento Kings Danny Ainge; Brad Lohaus	To Boston Celtics Joe Kleine; Ed Pinckney

Player Transactions Citation:

== See also ==
- 1988-89 NBA season
