= 1988–89 Indiana Pacers season =

NBA professional basketball team season

- Head coach: Jack Ramsay (resigned); Mel Daniels (interim); George Irvine (interim); Dick Versace
- General manager: Donnie Walsh
- Owner: Herbert Simon
- Arena: Market Square Arena

Results
- Record: 28–54 (.341)
- Place: Division: 6th (Central); Conference: 10th (Eastern)
- Playoff finish: Did not qualify
- Stats at Basketball Reference

Local media
- Television: WXIN (Bill Hazen, Clark Kellogg)
- Radio: WNDE (Mark Boyle, Bobby "Slick" Leonard)

The 1988–89 Indiana Pacers season was the 13th season for the Indiana Pacers in the National Basketball Association, and their 22nd season as a franchise.

== Season summary ==
=== Off-season ===
Despite finishing with a 38–44 record the previous season, the Pacers received the second overall pick in the 1988 NBA draft, and selected 7' 4" Dutch center Rik Smits out of Marist College. Before the regular season began, center Steve Stipanovich was out due a left knee injury, and would be sidelined for the entire season after undergoing knee surgery.

=== Regular season ===
Despite the addition of Smits, the Pacers struggled losing their first nine games of the regular season, posted another nine-game losing streak between December and January, and later on held an 11–35 record at the All-Star break. The Pacers went through four different head coaches this season; head coach Jack Ramsay resigned after an 0–7 start to the season, then after two games under interim coach Mel Daniels, and 20 games under interim coach George Irvine, the team hired Dick Versace as their new head coach. At mid-season, the team traded Wayman Tisdale to the Sacramento Kings in exchange for LaSalle Thompson and Randy Wittman, and traded Herb Williams to the Dallas Mavericks in exchange for German small forward Detlef Schrempf. Before the trades, Tisdale averaged 16.0 points and 6.5 rebounds per game in 48 games, while Williams provided with 12.6 points, 8.6 rebounds and 1.7 blocks per game in 46 games. The Pacers suffered a 12-game losing streak between January and February, but played around .500 in winning percentage by posting an 8–8 in March, and won six of their final nine games of the season, finishing in last place in the Central Division with a 28–54 record.

Chuck Person averaged 21.6 points, 6.5 rebounds and 3.6 assists per game, while second-year star Reggie Miller showed improvement becoming the team's starting shooting guard, averaging 16.0 points and 1.3 steals per game, plus leading the Pacers with 98 three-point field goals, and Schrempf provided the team with 14.8 points and 7.2 rebounds per game in 32 games after the trade. In addition, Vern Fleming contributed 14.3 points and 6.5 assists per game, while Thompson provided with 12.5 points and 9.9 rebounds per game in 33 games, and Smits averaged 11.7 points, 6.1 rebounds and 1.8 blocks per game, and was named to the NBA All-Rookie First Team. Meanwhile, Scott Skiles contributed 6.8 points and 4.9 assists per game, and Wittman provided with 5.2 points and 2.4 assists per game in 33 games.

During the NBA All-Star weekend at the Houston Astrodome in Houston, Texas, Miller participated in the NBA Three-Point Shootout. The Pacers finished 22nd in the NBA in home-game attendance, with an attendance of 335,298 at the Market Square Arena during the regular season, which was the fourth-lowest in the league.

=== Aftermath ===
Following the season, Stipanovich retired after only five seasons in the NBA with the Pacers; Stipanovich had gone through two knee operations, and doctors discovered he had a "dead spot" in the bone of his left knee. Meanwhile, Skiles was left unprotected in the 1989 NBA expansion draft, where he was selected by the Orlando Magic expansion team.

== Draft picks ==
Round	Pick	Player	Position	Nationality	College
1	2	Rik Smits	C	Netherlands	Marist
3	61	Herbert Crook	F	United States	Louisville
3	73	Michael Anderson		United States	Drexel

== Roster ==
1988–89 Indiana Pacers roster
Players

Pos.	No.	Player	Height	Weight	DOB	From
C	54	Greg Dreiling	7 ft 1 in (2.16 m)	250 lb (113 kg)	1962–11–07	Kansas
G	10	Vern Fleming	6 ft 5 in (1.96 m)	185 lb (84 kg)	1962–02–04	Georgia
F	22	Anthony Frederick	6 ft 7 in (2.01 m)	205 lb (93 kg)	1964–12–07	Pepperdine
C	55	Stuart Gray	7 ft 0 in (2.13 m)	235 lb (107 kg)	1963–05–27	UCLA
G	31	Reggie Miller	6 ft 7 in (2.01 m)	185 lb (84 kg)	1965–08–24	UCLA
F	45	Chuck Person	6 ft 8 in (2.03 m)	220 lb (100 kg)	1964–06–27	Auburn
F	11	Detlef Schrempf	6 ft 9 in (2.06 m)	214 lb (97 kg)	1963–01–21	Washington
G	3	Scott Skiles	6 ft 1 in (1.85 m)	180 lb (82 kg)	1964–03–05	Michigan State
C	24	Rik Smits	7 ft 4 in (2.24 m)	250 lb (113 kg)	1966–08–23	Marist
G	15	Everette Stephens	6 ft 2 in (1.88 m)	175 lb (79 kg)	1966–10–21	Purdue
C	40	Steve Stipanovich (injured) (IN)	6 ft 11 in (2.11 m)	245 lb (111 kg)	1960–11–17	Missouri
C	41	LaSalle Thompson	6 ft 10 in (2.08 m)	245 lb (111 kg)	1961–06–23	Texas
F	14	Randy Wittman	6 ft 6 in (1.98 m)	210 lb (95 kg)	1959–10–28	Indiana

Coaches
Head coach
- Jack Ramsay (resigned)
- Mel Daniels (interim)
- George Irvine (interim)
- Dick Versace
Assistant(s)
- Mel Daniels
- George Irvine
- Dave Twardzik

Legend
- (DP) Unsigned draft pick
- (FA) Free agent
- (S) Suspended
- Injured

Roster
Updated: February 21, 1989

=== Roster notes ===
- Center Steve Stipanovich was on the injured reserve list due to a left knee injury, and missed the entire regular season.

== Regular season ==
=== Season standings ===
Central Division	W	L	PCT	GB	Home	Road	Div
y-Detroit Pistons	63	19	.768	–	37–4	26–15	20–10
x-Cleveland Cavaliers	57	25	.695	6	37–4	20–21	19–11
x-Atlanta Hawks	52	30	.634	11	33–8	19–22	20–10
x-Milwaukee Bucks	49	33	.598	14	31–10	18–23	11–19
x-Chicago Bulls	47	35	.573	16	30–11	17–24	12–18
Indiana Pacers	28	54	.341	35	20–21	8–33	8–22

#	Eastern Conference				
#	Team	W	L	PCT	GB
1	z-Detroit Pistons	63	19	.768	–
2	y-New York Knicks	52	30	.634	11
3	x-Cleveland Cavaliers	57	25	.695	6
4	x-Atlanta Hawks	52	30	.634	11
5	x-Milwaukee Bucks	49	33	.598	14
6	x-Chicago Bulls	47	35	.573	16
7	x-Philadelphia 76ers	46	36	.561	17
8	x-Boston Celtics	42	40	.512	21
9	Washington Bullets	40	42	.488	23
10	Indiana Pacers	28	54	.341	35
11	New Jersey Nets	26	56	.317	37
12	Charlotte Hornets	20	62	.244	43

z - clinched division title
y - clinched division title
x - clinched playoff spot

== Player statistics ==
=== Regular season ===
Player	POS	GP	GS	MP	REB	AST	STL	BLK	PTS	MPG	RPG	APG	SPG	BPG	PPG
Rik Smits	C	82	71	2,041	500	70	37	151	956	24.9	6.1	.9	.5	1.8	11.7
Chuck Person	SF	80	79	3,012	516	289	83	18	1,728	37.7	6.5	3.6	1.0	.2	21.6
Scott Skiles	PG	80	13	1,571	149	390	64	2	546	19.6	1.9	4.9	.8	.0	6.8
Vern Fleming	PG	76	69	2,552	310	494	77	12	1,084	33.6	4.1	6.5	1.0	.2	14.3
Reggie Miller	SG	74	70	2,536	292	227	93	29	1,181	34.3	3.9	3.1	1.3	.4	16.0
Stuart Gray	C	72	0	783	245	29	11	21	188	10.9	3.4	.4	.2	.3	2.6
Greg Dreiling	C	53	4	396	92	18	5	11	129	7.5	1.7	.3	.1	.2	2.4
Wayman Tisdale^{†}	PF	48	5	1,326	310	75	35	32	768	27.6	6.5	1.6	.7	.7	16.0
Herb Williams^{†}	C	46	46	1,567	396	88	31	80	578	34.1	8.6	1.9	.7	1.7	12.6
Anthony Frederick	SF	46	0	313	52	20	14	6	152	6.8	1.1	.4	.3	.1	3.3
John Long^{†}	SG	44	1	767	66	65	29	1	323	17.4	1.5	1.5	.7	.0	7.3
Everette Stephens	PG	35	0	209	23	37	9	4	65	6.0	.7	1.1	.3	.1	1.9
LaSalle Thompson^{†}	C	33	29	1,053	326	37	33	39	413	31.9	9.9	1.1	1.0	1.2	12.5
Randy Wittman^{†}	SF	33	11	704	54	79	13	2	173	21.3	1.6	2.4	.4	.1	5.2
Detlef Schrempf^{†}	PF	32	12	1,005	229	93	29	10	475	31.4	7.2	2.9	.9	.3	14.8
Richard Morton	PG	2	0	11	0	1	0	0	6	5.5	.0	.5	.0	.0	3.0
Sedric Toney	PG	2	0	9	2	0	0	0	2	4.5	1.0	.0	.0	.0	1.0

- ^{†} Denotes player spent time with another team in the season. Stats reflect time with the Pacers only.

== Awards and records ==
- Rik Smits, NBA All-Rookie Team 1st Team

== See also ==
- 1988-89 NBA season
