= 1988–89 Atlanta Hawks season =

NBA professional basketball team season

- Head coach: Mike Fratello
- General manager: Stan Kasten
- Owners: Ted Turner / Turner Broadcasting System
- Arena: Omni Coliseum

Results
- Record: 52–30 (.634)
- Place: Division: 3rd (Central); Conference: 4th (Eastern)
- Playoff finish: First round (lost to Bucks 2–3)
- Stats at Basketball Reference

Local media
- Television: WTBS/WGNX (Al Albert, Walt "Clyde" Frazier, Bob Neal)
- Radio: WGST (John Sterling, Mike Glenn)

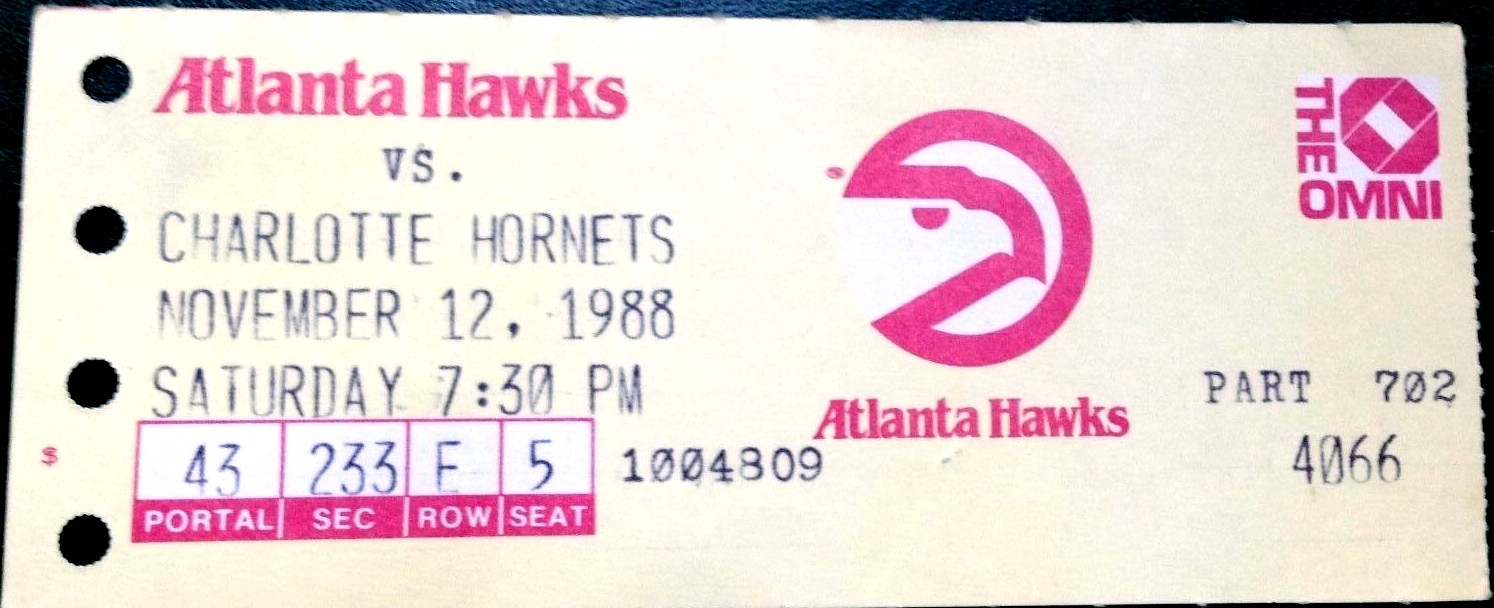
A ticket for a November 1988 game between the Hawks and the Charlotte Hornets.

The 1988–89 Atlanta Hawks season was the 40th season for the Atlanta Hawks in the National Basketball Association, and their 21st season in Atlanta, Georgia.

== Season summary ==
=== Off-season ===
After falling into the second round of the NBA playoffs for three straight seasons, the Hawks signed free agent and All-Star forward Moses Malone, who won an NBA championship with the Philadelphia 76ers in the 1983 NBA Finals, acquired All-Star guard Reggie Theus from the Sacramento Kings before draft day, and signed undrafted rookie small forward Duane Ferrell during the off-season. However, Kevin Willis was out due to a broken foot suffered during the preseason, and was later on suspended indefinitely for missing functions and rehabilitation therapy.

During the off-season in July, the Hawks became the first NBA team to play an exhibition match in the Soviet Union, in which they played three exhibition games against the Soviet Union national basketball team.

=== Regular season ===
With the addition of Malone and Theus, the Hawks won their first three games of the regular season, but then struggled losing six of their next nine games, leading to a 6–6 start to the season. However, the team posted a six-game winning streak between November and December afterwards, posting an 11–3 record in December, and later on holding a 28–19 record at the All-Star break. The Hawks posted a nine-game winning streak in April, won 12 of their final 14 games of the season, and finished in third place in the Central Division with a 52–30 record, earning the fourth seed in the Eastern Conference; the team also reached 50 wins for the fourth consecutive season.

Dominique Wilkins averaged 26.2 points, 6.9 rebounds and 1.5 steals per game, and was named to the All-NBA Third Team, while Malone averaged 20.2 points and 11.8 rebounds per game, and Theus provided the team with 15.8 points, 4.7 assists and 1.4 steals per game. In addition, Doc Rivers provided with 13.6 points, 6.9 assists and 2.4 steals per game, while John Battle contributed 9.5 points per game, and Cliff Levingston averaged 9.2 points and 6.2 rebounds per game. Meanwhile, Antoine Carr provided with 7.5 points and 3.5 rebounds per game, Jon Koncak averaged 4.7 points, 6.1 rebounds and 1.3 blocks per game, and Spud Webb contributed 3.9 points and 3.5 assists per game.

During the NBA All-Star weekend at the Houston Astrodome in Houston, Texas, Wilkins and Malone were both selected for the 1989 NBA All-Star Game, as members of the Eastern Conference All-Star team; it was Malone's final All-Star appearance. Meanwhile, Webb participated in the NBA Slam Dunk Contest for the third time; Wilkins was also selected for the Slam Dunk Contest, but did not participate. Malone finished tied in 13th place in Most Valuable Player voting.

The Hawks finished eleventh in the NBA in home-game attendance, with an attendance of 644,291 at the Omni Coliseum during the regular season.

=== NBA playoffs ===
In the Eastern Conference First Round of the 1989 NBA playoffs, and for the second consecutive year, the Hawks faced off against the 5th–seeded Milwaukee Bucks, a team that featured All-Star forward Terry Cummings, sixth man Ricky Pierce, and Jack Sikma. The Hawks won Game 1 over the Bucks at home, 100–92 at the Omni Coliseum, but then lost the next two games, which included a Game 3 loss to the Bucks on the road in overtime, 117–113 at the Bradley Center as the Bucks took a 2–1 series lead. The Hawks managed to win Game 4 over the Bucks on the road in overtime, 113–106 to even the series. However, the Hawks lost Game 5 to the Bucks at the Omni Coliseum, 96–92, thus losing in a hard-fought five-game series.

=== Notable highlights ===
One notable highlight of the regular season occurred on April 5, 1989, in which the Hawks defeated the Philadelphia 76ers at home by a 42-point margin, 135–93 at the Omni Coliseum. The Hawks got off to an 18–2 lead early in the game, and later on held a 78–37 lead over the 76ers at halftime; at one point during the game, the Hawks led by 50 points with a 130–80 lead late in the fourth quarter, when Carr hit a technical free throw with 2 minutes and 53 seconds left in the game.

=== Aftermath ===
Following the season, Theus was left unprotected in the 1989 NBA expansion draft, where he was selected by the Orlando Magic expansion team.

== Draft picks ==
Round	Pick	Player	Position	Nationality	College
2	44	Anthony Taylor		United States	Oregon
3	54	Jorge González	C	Argentina	
3	68	Darryl Middleton	PF	United States	Baylor

== Roster ==
1988–89 Atlanta Hawks roster
Players

Pos.	No.	Player	Height	Weight	DOB	From
G	12	John Battle	6 ft 2 in (1.88 m)	175 lb (79 kg)	1962–11–09	Rutgers
G	22	Dudley Bradley	6 ft 6 in (1.98 m)	195 lb (88 kg)	1957–03–19	North Carolina
F	35	Antoine Carr	6 ft 9 in (2.06 m)	225 lb (102 kg)	1961–07–23	Wichita State
F	33	Duane Ferrell	6 ft 7 in (2.01 m)	208 lb (94 kg)	1965–02–28	Georgia Tech
C	32	Jon Koncak	7 ft 0 in (2.13 m)	250 lb (113 kg)	1963–05–17	SMU
F	53	Cliff Levingston	6 ft 8 in (2.03 m)	210 lb (95 kg)	1961–01–04	Wichita State
C	2	Moses Malone	6 ft 10 in (2.08 m)	260 lb (118 kg)	1955–03–23	Petersburg HS (VA)
G	25	Doc Rivers	6 ft 4 in (1.93 m)	185 lb (84 kg)	1961–10–13	Marquette
G	24	Reggie Theus	6 ft 7 in (2.01 m)	190 lb (86 kg)	1957–10–13	UNLV
F	34	Ray Tolbert	6 ft 9 in (2.06 m)	225 lb (102 kg)	1958–09–10	Indiana
G	4	Spud Webb	5 ft 6 in (1.68 m)	133 lb (60 kg)	1963–07–13	NC State
F	21	Dominique Wilkins	6 ft 7 in (2.01 m)	200 lb (91 kg)	1960–01–12	Georgia
F/C	42	Kevin Willis (S)	7 ft 0 in (2.13 m)	220 lb (100 kg)	1962–09–06	Michigan State

Coaches
Head coach
- Mike Fratello
Assistant(s)
- Brian Hill
- Cazzie Russell

Legend
- (DP) Unsigned draft pick
- (FA) Free agent
- (S) Suspended
- Injured

Roster
Updated: March 7, 1989

=== Roster Notes ===
- Power forward Kevin Willis was suspended indefinitely for missing functions and rehabilitation therapy; Willis was out with a broken foot sustained during the preseason.

== Regular season ==
=== Season standings ===
Central Division	W	L	PCT	GB	Home	Road	Div
y-Detroit Pistons	63	19	.768	–	37–4	26–15	20–10
x-Cleveland Cavaliers	57	25	.695	6	37–4	20–21	19–11
x-Atlanta Hawks	52	30	.634	11	33–8	19–22	20–10
x-Milwaukee Bucks	49	33	.598	14	31–10	18–23	11–19
x-Chicago Bulls	47	35	.573	16	30–11	17–24	12–18
Indiana Pacers	28	54	.341	35	20–21	8–33	8–22

#	Eastern Conference				
#	Team	W	L	PCT	GB
1	z-Detroit Pistons	63	19	.768	–
2	y-New York Knicks	52	30	.634	11
3	x-Cleveland Cavaliers	57	25	.695	6
4	x-Atlanta Hawks	52	30	.634	11
5	x-Milwaukee Bucks	49	33	.598	14
6	x-Chicago Bulls	47	35	.573	16
7	x-Philadelphia 76ers	46	36	.561	17
8	x-Boston Celtics	42	40	.512	21
9	Washington Bullets	40	42	.488	23
10	Indiana Pacers	28	54	.341	35
11	New Jersey Nets	26	56	.317	37
12	Charlotte Hornets	20	62	.244	43

z - clinched division title
y - clinched division title
x - clinched playoff spot

=== Game log ===
1988–89 game log
Total: 52–30 (home: 33–8; road: 19–22)
November: 8–6 (home: 5–0; road: 3–6)

Game	Date	Team	Score	High points	High rebounds	High assists	Location Attendance	Record

December: 11–3 (home: 8–2; road: 3–1)

Game	Date	Team	Score	High points	High rebounds	High assists	Location Attendance	Record

January: 7–7 (home: 5–1; road: 2–6)

Game	Date	Team	Score	High points	High rebounds	High assists	Location Attendance	Record

February: 9–4 (home: 5–1; road: 4–3)

Game	Date	Team	Score	High points	High rebounds	High assists	Location Attendance	Record

March: 7–8 (home: 4–4; road: 3–4)

Game	Date	Team	Score	High points	High rebounds	High assists	Location Attendance	Record

April: 10–2 (home: 6–0; road: 4–2)

Game	Date	Team	Score	High points	High rebounds	High assists	Location Attendance	Record

1988–89 schedule

== Playoffs ==
1989 playoff game log
First round: 2–3 (home: 1–2; road: 1–1)

Game	Date	Team	Score	High points	High rebounds	High assists	Location Attendance	Series
1	April 27	Milwaukee	W 100–92	Dominique Wilkins (28)	Moses Malone (13)	Doc Rivers (10)	Omni Coliseum; 14,541	1–0
2	April 29	Milwaukee	L 98–108	Dominique Wilkins (32)	Moses Malone (8)	Doc Rivers (8)	Omni Coliseum; 15,742	1–1
3	May 2	@ Milwaukee	L 113–117 (OT)	Dominique Wilkins (30)	Jon Koncak (11)	Reggie Theus (5)	Bradley Center; 18,469	1–2
4	May 5	@ Milwaukee	W 113–106 (OT)	Malone, Wilkins (24)	Moses Malone (17)	Spud Webb (7)	Bradley Center; 18,633	2–2
5	May 7	Milwaukee	L 92–96	Moses Malone (25)	Moses Malone (16)	Rivers, Theus (6)	Omni Coliseum; 16,220	2–3

1989 schedule

== Player statistics ==
Legend
GP	Games played	GS	Games started	MPG	Minutes per game
FG%	Field-goal percentage	3P%	3-point field-goal percentage	FT%	Free-throw percentage
RPG	Rebounds per game	APG	Assists per game	SPG	Steals per game
BPG	Blocks per game	PPG	Points per game

=== Season ===
Player	GP	GS	MPG	FG%	3FG%	FT%	RPG	APG	SPG	BPG	PPG
Dominique Wilkins	80	80	37.5	46.4	27.6	84.4	6.9	2.6	1.5	0.7	26.2
Moses Malone	81	80	35.5	49.1	0.0	78.9	11.8	1.4	1.0	1.2	20.2
Reggie Theus	82	82	30.7	46.6	29.3	85.1	3.0	4.7	1.3	0.2	15.8
Doc Rivers	76	76	32.4	45.5	34.7	86.1	3.8	6.9	2.4	0.5	13.6
John Battle	82	0	20.4	45.7	32.4	81.5	1.7	2.4	0.5	0.1	9.5
Cliff Levingston	80	52	27.3	52.8	20.0	69.6	6.2	0.9	1.2	0.9	9.2
Antoine Carr	78	12	19.1	48.0	0.0	85.5	3.5	1.2	0.4	0.8	7.5
Jon Koncak	74	22	20.7	52.4	0.0	55.3	6.1	0.8	0.7	1.3	4.7
Spud Webb	81	6	15.0	45.9	4.5	86.7	1.5	3.5	0.9	0.1	3.9
Duane Ferrell	41	0	5.6	42.2	0.0	68.2	1.0	0.2	0.2	0.1	2.4
Ray Tolbert	50	0	6.8	42.6	0.0	62.2	1.8	0.3	0.3	0.3	2.1
Dudley Bradley	38	0	7.0	32.6	25.8	50.0	0.8	0.6	0.4	0.1	1.9
Pace Mannion	5	0	3.6	33.3	0.0	0.0	0.4	0.4	0.4	0.0	0.8

=== Playoffs ===
Player	GP	GS	MPG	FG%	3FG%	FT%	RPG	APG	SPG	BPG	PPG
Dominique Wilkins	5	5	42.4	44.8	29.4	71.1	5.4	3.4	0.8	1.6	27.2
Moses Malone	5	5	39.4	50.0	100.0	78.4	12.0	1.8	1.4	0.8	21.0
Doc Rivers	5	5	38.2	38.6	31.6	70.8	4.8	6.8	1.4	0.4	13.4
Jon Koncak	5	5	38.4	62.1	0.0	84.8	9.6	0.8	0.4	1.6	12.8
John Battle	5	0	23.6	43.5	0.0	75.0	2.6	3.2	0.4	0.0	9.8
Reggie Theus	5	5	25.4	36.8	0.0	75.0	1.4	4.8	0.2	0.0	7.4
Antoine Carr	5	0	16.2	61.9	0.0	72.7	1.6	1.4	0.0	0.8	6.8
Cliff Levingston	5	0	15.4	27.3	100.0	90.0	3.4	0.4	0.0	0.6	3.2
Spud Webb	5	0	11.0	27.3	0.0	100.0	0.8	3.0	0.8	0.0	1.6

Player statistics citation:

== Awards and records ==
- Dominique Wilkins, All-NBA Third Team

== See also ==
- 1988-89 NBA season
