= 1988–89 Utah Jazz season =

NBA team season

- Division champions
- Head coach: Frank Layden (resigned); Jerry Sloan
- General manager: Dave Checketts
- Owner: Larry H. Miller
- Arena: Salt Palace

Results
- Record: 51–31 (.622)
- Place: Division: 1st (Midwest); Conference: 2nd (Western)
- Playoff finish: First round (lost to Warriors 0–3)
- Stats at Basketball Reference

Local media
- Television: KSTU; Jazz Cable Network
- Radio: KALL (Hot Rod Hundley, Ron Boone)

The 1988–89 Utah Jazz season was the 15th season for the Utah Jazz in the National Basketball Association, and their tenth season in Salt Lake City, Utah.

== Season summary ==
=== Off-season ===
The Jazz had the 17th overall pick in the 1988 NBA draft, and selected center Eric Leckner from the University of Wyoming. During the off-season, the team acquired Mike Brown from the Charlotte Hornets expansion team.

=== Regular season ===
The Jazz got off to a fast start by winning eight of their first ten games of the regular season, which included a seven-game winning streak in November. After an 11–6 start to the season, head coach Frank Layden retired and was replaced with assistant coach Jerry Sloan, who became a full-time head coach. Sloan would go on to coach the Jazz for 23 seasons, including two trips to the NBA Finals in 1997 and 1998, and 19 playoff appearances out of 22 seasons, including 15 consecutive appearances from 1989 to 2003, and four more from 2007 to 2010 before he resigned midway through the 2010–11 season. The Jazz held a 28–20 record at the All-Star break, posted a seven-game winning streak in March, and finished in first place in the Midwest Division with a 51–31 record, earning the second seed in the Western Conference. The team qualified for the NBA playoffs for the sixth consecutive year.

Karl Malone averaged 29.1 points, 10.7 rebounds and 1.8 steals per game, and was named to the All-NBA First Team, while sixth man Thurl Bailey averaged 19.5 points and 5.5 rebounds per game off the bench, and John Stockton provided the team with 17.1 points, 13.2 assists and 3.2 steals per game, and was named to the All-NBA Second Team, and to the NBA All-Defensive Second Team. In addition, Darrell Griffith provided with 13.8 points per game, while Bob Hansen contributed 7.4 points per game, but only played just 46 games due to injury, Mark Eaton averaged 6.2 points, 10.3 rebounds and 3.8 blocks per game, and was named the NBA Defensive Player of the Year, and was also named to the NBA All-Defensive First Team, and Brown contributed 4.5 points and 3.9 rebounds per game.

During the NBA All-Star weekend at the Houston Astrodome in Houston, Texas, Malone, Stockton and Eaton were all selected for the 1989 NBA All-Star Game, as members of the Western Conference All-Star team; it was Stockton's first ever All-Star appearance, and the first and only All-Star appearance for Eaton. Malone scored 28 points along with 9 rebounds, while Stockton contributed 11 points and 17 assists; Malone was named the NBA All-Star Game Most Valuable Player, as the Western Conference defeated the Eastern Conference, 143–134. Malone also finished in third place in Most Valuable Player voting, behind Magic Johnson of the Los Angeles Lakers, and Michael Jordan of the Chicago Bulls, while Stockton finished in seventh place, and Eaton finished tied in 13th place; Bailey finished in second place in Sixth Man of the Year voting, behind Eddie Johnson of the Phoenix Suns.

The Jazz finished 18th in the NBA in home-game attendance, with an attendance of 509,901 at the Salt Palace during the regular season. During the regular season, the Jazz sold 10,153 season tickets, which was an increase of 550 from the previous season.

=== NBA playoffs ===
In the Western Conference First Round of the 1989 NBA playoffs, the Jazz faced off against the 7th–seeded Golden State Warriors, a team that featured All-Star forward Chris Mullin, Rookie of the Year, Mitch Richmond, and Terry Teagle. However, the Jazz lost the first two games to the Warriors at home at the Salt Palace, before losing Game 3 on the road, 120–106 at the Oakland-Alameda County Coliseum Arena, thus losing the series in a three-game sweep.

== Draft picks ==
Round	Pick	Player	Position	Nationality	College
1	17	Eric Leckner	C/PF	United States	Wyoming
2	42	Jeff Moe		United States	Iowa
3	67	Ricky Grace	PG	United States	Oklahoma

== Roster ==
1988–89 Utah Jazz roster
Players

Pos.	No.	Player	Height	Weight	DOB	From
F	41	Thurl Bailey	6 ft 11 in (2.11 m)	215 lb (98 kg)	1961–04–07	NC State
C	40	Mike Brown	6 ft 9 in (2.06 m)	257 lb (117 kg)	1963–07–19	George Washington
C	53	Mark Eaton	7 ft 4 in (2.24 m)	275 lb (125 kg)	1957–01–24	UCLA
G	21	Jim Farmer	6 ft 4 in (1.93 m)	190 lb (86 kg)	1964–09–23	Alabama
G	35	Darrell Griffith	6 ft 4 in (1.93 m)	190 lb (86 kg)	1958–06–16	Louisville
G	20	Bob Hansen	6 ft 6 in (1.98 m)	190 lb (86 kg)	1961–01–18	Iowa
F	43	Marc Iavaroni	6 ft 8 in (2.03 m)	210 lb (95 kg)	1956–09–15	Virginia
C	45	Eric Leckner	6 ft 11 in (2.11 m)	265 lb (120 kg)	1966–05–27	Wyoming
G	25	Jim Les	5 ft 11 in (1.80 m)	165 lb (75 kg)	1963–08–18	Bradley
F	32	Karl Malone	6 ft 9 in (2.06 m)	250 lb (113 kg)	1963–07–24	Louisiana Tech
F	44	José Ortiz	6 ft 11 in (2.11 m)	260 lb (118 kg)	1963–10–25	Oregon State
G	12	John Stockton	6 ft 1 in (1.85 m)	170 lb (77 kg)	1962–03–26	Gonzaga

Coaches
Head coach
- Frank Layden (resigned)
- Jerry Sloan
Assistant(s)
- Phil Johnson
- Scott Layden

Legend
- (DP) Unsigned draft pick
- (FA) Free agent
- (S) Suspended
- Injured

Roster
Updated: January 15, 1989

== Regular season ==
=== Season standings ===
Midwest Division	W	L	PCT	GB	Home	Road	Div
y-Utah Jazz	51	31	.622	–	34–7	17–24	19–11
x-Houston Rockets	45	37	.549	6	31–10	14–27	19–11
x-Denver Nuggets	44	38	.537	7	35–6	9–32	18–12
Dallas Mavericks	38	44	.463	13	24–17	14–27	19–11
San Antonio Spurs	21	61	.256	30	18–23	3–38	9–21
Miami Heat	15	67	.183	36	12–29	3–38	6–24

#	Western Conference				
#	Team	W	L	PCT	GB
1	c-Los Angeles Lakers	57	25	.695	–
2	y-Utah Jazz	51	31	.622	6
3	x-Phoenix Suns	55	27	.671	2
4	x-Seattle SuperSonics	47	35	.573	10
5	x-Houston Rockets	45	37	.549	12
6	x-Denver Nuggets	44	38	.537	13
7	x-Golden State Warriors	43	39	.524	14
8	x-Portland Trail Blazers	39	43	.476	18
9	Dallas Mavericks	38	44	.463	19
10	Sacramento Kings	27	55	.329	30
11	San Antonio Spurs	21	61	.256	36
12	Los Angeles Clippers	21	61	.256	36
13	Miami Heat	15	67	.183	42

== Game log ==
=== Regular season ===
1988–89 game log
Total: 51–31 (home: 34–7; road: 17–24)
November: 9–4 (home: 8–1; road: 1–3)

Game	Date	Team	Score	High points	High rebounds	High assists	Location Attendance	Record
1	November 4	Seattle					Salt Palace	0–1
2	November 9	Sacramento					Salt Palace	1–1
3	November 10	@ Houston					The Summit	1–2
4	November 12	@ San Antonio					HemisFair Arena	2–2
5	November 15	Indiana					Salt Palace	3–2
6	November 17	Portland					Salt Palace	4–2
7	November 19	Phoenix					Salt Palace	5–2
8	November 21	L.A. Clippers					Salt Palace	6–2
9	November 23	Houston					Salt Palace	7–2
10	November 25	San Antonio					Salt Palace	8–2
11	November 26	@ Dallas					Reunion Arena	8–3
12	November 29	@ Seattle					Seattle Center Coliseum	8–4
13	November 30	Chicago	W 107–93				Salt Palace	9–4

December: 8–8 (home: 5–1; road: 3–7)

Game	Date	Team	Score	High points	High rebounds	High assists	Location Attendance	Record
14	December 2	@ L.A. Lakers	L 92–113				The Forum	9–5
15	December 3	@ Sacramento					ARCO Arena	10–5
16	December 6	@ Golden State					Oakland–Alameda County Coliseum Arena	10–6
17	December 7	Washington					Salt Palace	11–6
18	December 9	Dallas					Salt Palace	11–7
19	December 10	@ L.A. Clippers					Los Angeles Memorial Sports Arena	12–7
20	December 12	Miami					Salt Palace	13–7
21	December 14	@ Boston					Boston Garden	13–8
22	December 15	@ New York					Madison Square Garden	13–9
23	December 17	@ Philadelphia					The Spectrum	13–10
24	December 20	@ Cleveland					Richfield Coliseum	13–11
25	December 21	@ Washington					Capital Centre	14–11
26	December 23	@ Miami					Miami Arena	14–12
27	December 25	L.A. Lakers	W 101–87				Salt Palace	15–12
28	December 28	Sacramento					Salt Palace	16–12
29	December 30	Philadelphia					Salt Palace	17–12

January: 9–4 (home: 3–1; road: 6–3)

Game	Date	Team	Score	High points	High rebounds	High assists	Location Attendance	Record
30	January 3	@ Houston					The Summit	17–13
31	January 6	@ Chicago	W 106–92				Chicago Stadium	18–13
32	January 7	@ Milwaukee					Bradley Center	18–14
33	January 9	@ Charlotte					Charlotte Coliseum	19–14
34	January 10	@ Miami					Miami Arena	20–14
35	January 12	San Antonio					Salt Palace	21–14
36	January 14	@ Golden State					Oakland–Alameda County Coliseum Arena	21–15
37	January 17	@ Portland					Memorial Coliseum	22–15
38	January 20	Milwaukee					Salt Palace	23–15
39	January 25	@ San Antonio					HemisFair Arena	24–15
40	January 26	Charlotte					Salt Palace	24–16
41	January 28	New York					Salt Palace	25–16
42	January 31	@ Dallas					Reunion Arena	26–16

February: 8–6 (home: 7–2; road: 1–4)

Game	Date	Team	Score	High points	High rebounds	High assists	Location Attendance	Record
43	February 1	Atlanta					Salt Palace	26–17
44	February 3	New Jersey					Salt Palace	27–17
45	February 4	@ Denver					McNichols Sports Arena	27–18
46	February 6	@ Phoenix					Arizona Veterans Memorial Coliseum	27–19
47	February 7	Miami					Salt Palace	28–19
48	February 9	Dallas					Salt Palace	28–20
All-Star Break
49	February 14	Denver					Salt Palace	29–20
50	February 16	Boston					Salt Palace	30–20
51	February 18	San Antonio					Salt Palace	31–20
52	February 20	Phoenix					Salt Palace	32–20
53	February 22	L.A. Lakers	W 105–79				Salt Palace	33–20
54	February 24	@ Denver					McNichols Sports Arena	33–21
55	February 26	@ Indiana					Market Square Arena	33–22
56	February 27	@ New Jersey					Miami Arena	34–22

March: 10–4 (home: 7–1; road: 3–3)

Game	Date	Team	Score	High points	High rebounds	High assists	Location Attendance	Record
57	March 1	@ Detroit	L 85–96				Palace of Auburn Hills	34–23
58	March 3	@ Miami					Miami Arena	35–23
59	March 5	@ Atlanta					The Omni	36–23
60	March 8	Houston					Salt Palace	37–23
61	March 10	Golden State					Salt Palace	38–23
62	March 13	Cleveland					Salt Palace	39–23
63	March 15	Portland					Salt Palace	40–23
64	March 17	Miami					Salt Palace	41–23
65	March 18	@ San Antonio					HemisFair Arena	41–24
66	March 21	@ Seattle					Seattle Center Coliseum	41–25
67	March 24	@ Houston					The Summit	42–25
68	March 25	Denver					Salt Palace	43–25
69	March 27	Seattle					Salt Palace	44–25
70	March 29	Detroit	L 104–108				Salt Palace	44–26

April: 7–5 (home: 4–1; road: 3–4)

Game	Date	Team	Score	High points	High rebounds	High assists	Location Attendance	Record
71	April 1	@ Sacramento					ARCO Arena	44–27
72	April 4	Dallas					Salt Palace	45–27
73	April 5	@ Phoenix					Arizona Veterans Memorial Coliseum	46–37
74	April 7	@ L.A. Lakers	W 99–97				Great Western Forum	46–28
75	April 8	@ Denver					McNichols Sports Arena	46–29
76	April 12	Denver					Salt Palace	47–29
77	April 14	Houston					Salt Palace	48–29
78	April 15	@ Portland					Memorial Coliseum	49–29
79	April 17	@ L.A. Clippers					Los Angeles Memorial Sports Arena	50–29
80	April 18	L.A. Clippers					Salt Palace	50–30
81	April 21	@ Dallas					Reunion Arena	50–31
82	April 22	Golden State					Salt Palace	51–31

1988–89 schedule

== Playoffs ==
1989 playoff game log
First Round: 0–3 (home: 0–2; road: 0–1)

Game	Date	Team	Score	High points	High rebounds	High assists	Location Attendance	Series
1	April 27	Golden State	L 119–123	John Stockton (30)	Karl Malone (13)	John Stockton (14)	Salt Palace; 12,444	0–1
2	April 29	Golden State	L 91–99	Karl Malone (37)	Karl Malone (22)	John Stockton (11)	Salt Palace; 12,444	0–2
3	May 2	@ Golden State	L 106–120	John Stockton (34)	Karl Malone (14)	John Stockton (16)	Oakland–Alameda County Coliseum Arena; 15,025	0–3

1989 schedule

== Player statistics ==
Legend
GP	Games played	GS	Games started	MPG	Minutes per game
FG%	Field-goal percentage	3P%	3-point field-goal percentage	FT%	Free-throw percentage
RPG	Rebounds per game	APG	Assists per game	SPG	Steals per game
BPG	Blocks per game	PPG	Points per game

=== Season ===
Utah Jazz statistics
Player	GP	GS	MPG	FG%	3P%	FT%	RPG	APG	SPG	BPG	PPG
Thurl Bailey	82	3	33.9	.483	.400	.825	5.5	1.7	0.5	1.1	19.5
Mike Brown	66	16	15.9	.419	.000	.718	3.9	0.6	0.4	0.3	4.5
Mark Eaton	82	82	35.5	.462	.000	.660	10.3	1.0	0.5	3.8	6.2
Jim Farmer	37	0	11.1	.401	.450	.707	1.5	0.8	0.2	0.0	4.1
Darrell Griffith	82	73	29.0	.446	.311	.780	4.0	1.6	1.0	0.3	13.8
Bob Hansen	46	9	21.0	.437	.352	.560	2.8	1.1	0.8	0.1	7.4
Marc Iavaroni	77	50	10.3	.442	.000	.818	1.7	0.4	0.1	0.2	2.3
Bart Kofoed	19	0	9.3	.364	.000	.545	0.6	1.1	0.5	0.0	1.6
Eric Leckner	75	0	10.4	.545	.000	.699	2.7	0.2	0.1	0.3	4.3
Jim Les	82	0	9.5	.301	.071	.781	1.1	2.6	0.3	0.1	1.7
Karl Malone	80	80	39.1	.519	.313	.766	10.7	2.7	1.8	0.9	29.1
Jose Ortiz	51	15	6.4	.440	.000	.596	1.1	0.2	0.2	0.1	2.8
Scott Roth	16	0	4.5	.292	.167	.727	0.5	0.4	0.3	0.1	1.4
John Stockton	82	82	38.7	.538	.462	.863	3.0	13.6	3.2	0.2	17.1
Eric White	1	0	2.0	.000	.000	.000	0	0	0	0	0

=== Playoffs ===
Utah Jazz statistics
Player	GP	GS	MPG	FG%	3P%	FT%	RPG	APG	SPG	BPG	PPG
Thurl Bailey	3	2	40.7	.353	.000	.800	8.3	1.0	0.3	1.3	12.0
Mike Brown	2	1	5.5	.000	.000	.000	1.0	0.0	0.0	0.0	0.0
Mark Eaton	3	3	33.0	.471	.000	.818	11.0	0.3	0.3	0.7	8.3
Jim Farmer	2	0	1.5	.000	.000	.000	0.0	0.0	0.0	0.0	0.0
Darrell Griffith	3	0	23.7	.408	.316	.000	4.0	0.0	1.3	0.3	15.3
Bob Hansen	3	3	41.0	.314	.333	.800	5.7	1.3	0.3	0.7	11.0
Marc Iavaroni	1	0	1.0	.000	.000	.000	0.0	0.0	0.0	0.0	0.0
Eric Leckner	3	0	3.3	.250	.000	.000	0.7	0.0	0.0	0.0	0.7
Jim Les	3	0	1.7	.000	.000	.000	0.0	0.7	0.0	0.0	0.0
Karl Malone	3	3	45.3	.500	.000	.813	16.3	1.3	1.0	0.3	30.7
John Stockton	3	3	46.3	.508	.750	.905	3.3	13.7	3.7	1.7	27.3

Player statistics citation:

== Awards and records ==
- Mark Eaton, NBA Defensive Player of the Year Award
- Karl Malone, All-NBA First Team
- John Stockton, All-NBA Second Team
- Mark Eaton, NBA All-Defensive First Team
- John Stockton, NBA All-Defensive Second Team

== Transactions ==
=== Trades ===
June 23, 1988
To Utah Jazz----
- Mike Brown
To Charlotte Hornets----
- Kelly Tripucka

=== Free agents ===
Player	Signed	Former team
Jim Les	October 25, 1988	Milwaukee Bucks

Subtractions
Player	Date signed	New team
Rickey Green	Expansion Draft June 23, 1988	Charlotte Hornets
