= 1988–89 Seattle SuperSonics season =

NBA professional basketball team season

- Head coach: Bernie Bickerstaff
- General manager: Bob Whitsitt
- Owner: Barry Ackerley
- Arena: Seattle Center Coliseum

Results
- Record: 47–35 (.573)
- Place: Division: 3rd (Pacific); Conference: 4th (Western)
- Playoff finish: Conference Semi-finals (lost to Lakers 0–4)
- Stats at Basketball Reference

Local media
- Television: KIRO-TV; KTZZ-TV; Northwest Cable Sports
- Radio: KJR (Kevin Calabro)

The 1988–89 Seattle SuperSonics season was the 22nd season for the Seattle SuperSonics in the National Basketball Association.

== Season summary ==
=== Off-season ===
The SuperSonics had the 15th overall pick in the 1988 NBA draft, and selected point guard Gary Grant from the University of Michigan; however, the team soon traded Grant to the Los Angeles Clippers in exchange for Michael Cage on draft day. During the off-season, the team signed free agent John Lucas.

=== Regular season ===
With the addition of Cage, the SuperSonics won their first three games of the regular season, but then lost five of their next six games afterwards. The team soon recovered and played above .500 in winning percentage for the remainder of the season, posting a six-game winning streak in January, and later on holding a 28–18 record at the All-Star break. However, the SuperSonics posted a seven-game losing streak between March and April, but then posted an eight-game winning streak afterwards, finishing in third place in the Pacific Division with a 47–35 record, and earning the fourth seed in the Western Conference.

Dale Ellis averaged 27.5 points and 1.3 steals per game, led the SuperSonics with 162 three-point field goals, and was named to the All-NBA Third Team, while Xavier McDaniel played a sixth man role off the bench, averaging 20.5 points and 5.3 rebounds per game, and second-year forward Derrick McKey became the team's starting small forward, averaging 15.9 points, 5.7 rebounds and 1.3 steals per game. In addition, Cage provided the team with 10.3 points and 9.6 rebounds per game, while Sedale Threatt contributed 8.6 points and 3.8 assists per game, Alton Lister provided with 8.0 points, 6.6 rebounds and 2.2 blocks per game, Nate McMillan averaged 7.1 points, 5.2 rebounds, 9.3 assists and 2.1 steals per game, and Jerry Reynolds contributed 7.6 points per game.

During the NBA All-Star weekend at the Houston Astrodome in Houston, Texas, Ellis was selected for the 1989 NBA All-Star Game, as a member of the Western Conference All-Star team; it was his first and only All-Star appearance. Ellis scored 27 points as the Western Conference defeated the Eastern Conference, 143–134. In addition, Ellis also participated in the NBA Three-Point Shootout for the fourth consecutive year, and won the competition. McDaniel finished in fifth place in Sixth Man of the Year voting, while McKey finished tied in seventh place in Most Improved Player voting.

The SuperSonics finished 19th in the NBA in home-game attendance, with an attendance of 456,765 at the Seattle Center Coliseum during the regular season.

=== NBA playoffs ===
In the Western Conference First Round of the 1989 NBA playoffs, the SuperSonics faced off against the 5th–seeded Houston Rockets, a team that featured the trio of All-Star center Akeem Olajuwon, Otis Thorpe and Sleepy Floyd. The SuperSonics won the first two games over the Rockets at home at the Seattle Center Coliseum, before losing Game 3 on the road, 126–107 at The Summit. The SuperSonics won Game 4 over the Rockets on the road, 98–96 to win the series in four games.

In the Western Conference Semi-finals, the team faced off against the top–seeded, and 2-time defending NBA champion Los Angeles Lakers, who won the Pacific Division title; the team was led by the quartet of All-Star guard, and Most Valuable Player of the Year, Magic Johnson, All-Star forward James Worthy, Byron Scott, and All-Star center Kareem Abdul-Jabbar. The SuperSonics lost the first two games to the Lakers on the road at the Great Western Forum, before losing the next two games at home, including a Game 4 loss to the Lakers at the Seattle Center Coliseum, 97–95, thus losing the series in a four-game sweep.

The Lakers would advance to the NBA Finals for the third consecutive year, but would lose to the Detroit Pistons in a four-game sweep in the 1989 NBA Finals.

=== Aftermath ===
Following the season, Lister was traded to the Golden State Warriors, while Lucas signed as a free agent with the Houston Rockets, and Reynolds was left unprotected in the 1989 NBA expansion draft, where he was selected by the Orlando Magic expansion team.

== Draft picks ==
At the 1988 Draft, the SuperSonics got the fifteenth overall pick behind the Phoenix Suns. With their first-round pick, the SuperSonics selected Gary Grant, but he would be traded on draft night along with a first-round pick to the Los Angeles Clippers for Michael Cage. In the third round, they selected guard Corey Gaines.

| Round | Pick | Player | Position | Nationality | College |
|---|---|---|---|---|---|
| 1 | 15 | Gary Grant (traded to L.A. Clippers) | PG | United States | Michigan |
| 3 | 65 | Corey Gaines | G | United States | Loyola Marymount |

== Roster ==
1988–89 Seattle SuperSonics roster
Players

| Pos. | No. | Player | Height | Weight | DOB | From |
|---|---|---|---|---|---|---|
| F | 42 | Greg Ballard | 6 ft 7 in (2.01 m) | 215 lb (98 kg) | 1955–01–29 | Oregon |
| F | 44 | Michael Cage | 6 ft 9 in (2.06 m) | 224 lb (102 kg) | 1962–01–28 | San Diego State |
| F | 41 | Mike Champion | 6 ft 10 in (2.08 m) | 230 lb (104 kg) | 1964–04–05 | Gonzaga |
| F | 3 | Dale Ellis | 6 ft 7 in (2.01 m) | 205 lb (93 kg) | 1960–08–06 | Tennessee |
| G | 15 | Avery Johnson | 5 ft 10 in (1.78 m) | 175 lb (79 kg) | 1965–03–25 | Southern |
| C | 53 | Alton Lister | 7 ft 0 in (2.13 m) | 240 lb (109 kg) | 1958–10–01 | Arizona State |
| G | 20 | John Lucas | 6 ft 3 in (1.91 m) | 175 lb (79 kg) | 1953–10–31 | Maryland |
| F | 34 | Xavier McDaniel | 6 ft 7 in (2.01 m) | 205 lb (93 kg) | 1963–06–04 | Wichita State |
| F | 31 | Derrick McKey | 6 ft 9 in (2.06 m) | 205 lb (93 kg) | 1966–10–10 | Alabama |
| G | 10 | Nate McMillan | 6 ft 5 in (1.96 m) | 195 lb (88 kg) | 1964–08–03 | NC State |
| C | 23 | Olden Polynice | 6 ft 11 in (2.11 m) | 220 lb (100 kg) | 1964–11–21 | Virginia |
| G | 35 | Jerry Reynolds | 6 ft 8 in (2.03 m) | 200 lb (91 kg) | 1962–12–23 | LSU |
| F | 40 | Russ Schoene | 6 ft 10 in (2.08 m) | 210 lb (95 kg) | 1960–04–16 | Chattanooga |
| G | 4 | Sedale Threatt | 6 ft 2 in (1.88 m) | 175 lb (79 kg) | 1961–09–10 | West Virginia Tech |

Coaches
Head coach
- Bernie Bickerstaff
Assistant(s)
- Bob Kloppenburg
- Tom Newell

Legend
- (DP) Unsigned draft pick
- (FA) Free agent
- (S) Suspended
- Injured

== Regular season ==
=== Season standings ===
| Pacific Division | W | L | PCT | GB | Home | Road | Div |
|---|---|---|---|---|---|---|---|
| y-Los Angeles Lakers | 57 | 25 | .695 | – | 35–6 | 22–19 | 25–9 |
| x-Phoenix Suns | 55 | 27 | .671 | 2 | 35–6 | 20–21 | 23–11 |
| x-Seattle SuperSonics | 47 | 35 | .573 | 10 | 31–10 | 16–25 | 20–14 |
| x-Golden State Warriors | 43 | 39 | .524 | 14 | 29–12 | 14–27 | 15–19 |
| x-Portland Trail Blazers | 39 | 43 | .476 | 18 | 28–13 | 11–30 | 17–17 |
| Sacramento Kings | 27 | 55 | .329 | 30 | 21–20 | 6–35 | 12–22 |
| Los Angeles Clippers | 21 | 61 | .256 | 36 | 17–24 | 4–37 | 7–27 |

| # | Western Conference | | | | |
| # | Team | W | L | PCT | GB |
|---|---|---|---|---|---|
| 1 | c-Los Angeles Lakers | 57 | 25 | .695 | – |
| 2 | y-Utah Jazz | 51 | 31 | .622 | 6 |
| 3 | x-Phoenix Suns | 55 | 27 | .671 | 2 |
| 4 | x-Seattle SuperSonics | 47 | 35 | .573 | 10 |
| 5 | x-Houston Rockets | 45 | 37 | .549 | 12 |
| 6 | x-Denver Nuggets | 44 | 38 | .537 | 13 |
| 7 | x-Golden State Warriors | 43 | 39 | .524 | 14 |
| 8 | x-Portland Trail Blazers | 39 | 43 | .476 | 18 |
| 9 | Dallas Mavericks | 38 | 44 | .463 | 19 |
| 10 | Sacramento Kings | 27 | 55 | .329 | 30 |
| 11 | San Antonio Spurs | 21 | 61 | .256 | 36 |
| 12 | Los Angeles Clippers | 21 | 61 | .256 | 36 |
| 13 | Miami Heat | 15 | 67 | .183 | 42 |

z – clinched division title
y – clinched division title
x – clinched playoff spot

=== Game log ===
1988–89 game log
Total: 47–35 (Home: 31–10; Road: 16–25)
November: 6–7 (home: 3–3; road: 3–4)

| Game | Date | Team | Score | High points | High rebounds | High assists | Location Attendance | Record |
|---|---|---|---|---|---|---|---|---|
| 1 | November 4 | at Utah Jazz | 104–97 | Dale Ellis (46) | | | Salt Palace; 12,444 | 1–0 |
| 2 | November 5 | Denver Nuggets | 142–141 (OT) | Xavier McDaniel (28) | | | Seattle Center Coliseum; 14,269 | 2–0 |
| 3 | November 8 | at Sacramento Kings | 97–75 | Dale Ellis (28) | | | ARCO Arena (II); 16,517 | 3–0 |
| 4 | November 9 | Golden State Warriors | 108–113 | John Lucas (25) | | | Seattle Center Coliseum; Not announced | 3–1 |
| 5 | November 11 | at L.A. Lakers | L 103–114 | Xavier McDaniel (20) | | | Great Western Forum; 17,505 | 3–2 |
| 6 | November 12 | at Denver Nuggets | 129–141 | Dale Ellis (29) | | | McNichols Sports Arena; 12,401 | 3–3 |
| 7 | November 17 | L.A. Lakers | W 101–98 | Dale Ellis (27) | | | Seattle Center Coliseum; 14,576 | 4–3 |
| 8 | November 19 | Dallas Mavericks | 106–112 | Xavier McDaniel (31) | | | Seattle Center Coliseum; 11,608 | 4–4 |
| 9 | November 22 | Portland Trail Blazers | 104–125 | Dale Ellis (22) | | | Seattle Center Coliseum; 10,956 | 4–5 |
| 10 | November 23 | at Golden State Warriors | 93–85 | Dale Ellis (36) | | | Oakland—Alameda County Coliseum Arena; 13,770 | 5–5 |
| 11 | November 25 | at Phoenix Suns | 105–110 | Dale Ellis (28) | | | Arizona Veterans Memorial Coliseum; 10,710 | 5–6 |
| 12 | November 29 | Utah Jazz | 109–102 | Dale Ellis (31) | | | Seattle Center Coliseum; 12,336 | 6–6 |
| 13 | November 30 | at L.A. Lakers | L 106–110 | Dale Ellis (36) | | | Great Western Forum; 17,505 | 6–7 |

December: 8–5 (home: 6–0; road: 2–5)

| Game | Date | Team | Score | High points | High rebounds | High assists | Location Attendance | Record |
|---|---|---|---|---|---|---|---|---|
| 14 | December 2 | Los Angeles Clippers | 154–104 | Dale Ellis; Xavier McDaniel (27) | | | Seattle Center Coliseum; Not announced | 7–7 |
| 15 | December 3 | Golden State Warriors | 136–106 | Dale Ellis (36) | | | Seattle Center Coliseum; 10,571 | 8–7 |
| 16 | December 6 | at San Antonio Spurs | 112–107 | Dale Ellis (28) | | | HemisFair Arena; Not announced | 9–7 |
| 17 | December 7 | at Dallas Mavericks | 98–102 | Dale Ellis (26) | | | Reunion Arena; 17,007 | 9–8 |
| 18 | December 10 | at Houston Rockets | 91–110 | Dale Ellis (26) | | | The Summit; 16,611 | 9–9 |
| 19 | December 13 | Phoenix Suns | 126–116 | Dale Ellis (33) | | | Seattle Center Coliseum; 13,500 | 10–9 |
| 20 | December 15 | San Antonio Spurs | 122–107 | Dale Ellis (28) | | | Seattle Center Coliseum; Not announced | 11–9 |
| 21 | December 17 | Sacramento Kings | 141–111 | Dale Ellis (27) | | | Seattle Center Coliseum; Not announced | 12–9 |
| 22 | December 20 | at Atlanta Hawks | 118–121 | Dale Ellis (30) | | | The Omni; 14,808 | 12–10 |
| 23 | December 21 | at Miami Heat | 109–101 | Xavier McDaniel (23) | | | Miami Arena; 15,008 | 13–10 |
| 24 | December 23 | at Cleveland Cavaliers | 107–119 (OT) | Dale Ellis (32) | | | Richfield Coliseum; 15,857 | 13–11 |
| 25 | December 27 | at Los Angeles Clippers | 100–104 | Dale Ellis (24) | | | Los Angeles Memorial Sports Arena; 11,505 | 13–12 |
| 26 | December 29 | Miami Heat | 129–99 | Dale Ellis; Xavier McDaniel (25) | | | Seattle Center Coliseum; 14,794 | 14–12 |

January: 12–3 (home: 10–1; road: 2–2)

| Game | Date | Team | Score | High points | High rebounds | High assists | Location Attendance | Record |
|---|---|---|---|---|---|---|---|---|
| 27 | January 3 | L.A. Lakers | W 116–106 | Dale Ellis (42) | | | Seattle Center Coliseum; 14,645 | 15–12 |
| 28 | January 5 | Sacramento Kings | 120–106 | Dale Ellis (49) | | | Seattle Center Coliseum; Not announced | 16–12 |
| 29 | January 7 | Portland Trail Blazers | 129–123 | Xavier McDaniel (29) | | | Seattle Center Coliseum; 14,726 | 17–12 |
| 30 | January 9 | Cleveland Cavaliers | 105–103 | Derrick McKey (32) | | | Seattle Center Coliseum; 13,119 | 18–12 |
| 31 | January 10 | at Portland Trail Blazers | 109–125 | Michael Cage (24) | | | Memorial Coliseum; 12,848 | 18–13 |
| 32 | January 12 | Dallas Mavericks | 130–95 | Dale Ellis (36) | | | Seattle Center Coliseum; 14,290 | 19–13 |
| 33 | January 14 | at Sacramento Kings | 102–93 | Dale Ellis (31) | | | ARCO Arena (II); 16,517 | 20–13 |
| 34 | January 16 | at Golden State Warriors | 117–146 | Dale Ellis (26) | | | Oakland—Alameda County Coliseum Arena; 12,340 | 20–14 |
| 35 | January 17 | Los Angeles Clippers | 130–107 | Dale Ellis (28) | | | Seattle Center Coliseum; 11,402 | 21–14 |
| 36 | January 19 | Houston Rockets | 124–108 | Xavier McDaniel (29) | | | Seattle Center Coliseum; 11,146 | 22–14 |
| 37 | January 21 | New York Knicks | 121–119 | Xavier McDaniel (36) | | | Seattle Center Coliseum; 14,810 | 23–14 |
| 38 | January 24 | at Portland Trail Blazers | 103–100 | Derrick McKey (34) | | | Memorial Coliseum; 12,848 | 24–14 |
| 39 | January 27 | Atlanta Hawks | 119–112 | Derrick McKey (28) | | | Seattle Center Coliseum; 23,362 | 25–14 |
| 40 | January 29 | Milwaukee Bucks | 112–106 | Derrick McKey (23) | | | Seattle Center Coliseum; 20,009 | 26–14 |
| 41 | January 31 | New Jersey Nets | 112–118 | Dale Ellis (33) | | | Seattle Center Coliseum; Not announced | 26–15 |

February: 7–6 (home: 3–2; road: 4–4)

| Game | Date | Team | Score | High points | High rebounds | High assists | Location Attendance | Record |
|---|---|---|---|---|---|---|---|---|
| 42 | February 2 | at Miami Heat | 100–93 | Dale Ellis (30) | | | Miami Arena; 14,798 | 27–15 |
| 43 | February 3 | at Charlotte Hornets | 106–108 | Dale Ellis (27) | | | Charlotte Coliseum; 23,388 | 27–16 |
| 44 | February 5 | at Boston Celtics | 89–87 | Dale Ellis (30) | | | Boston Garden; 14,890 | 28–16 |
| 45 | February 7 | at New Jersey Nets | 99–109 | Dale Ellis (34) | | | Brendan Byrne Arena; Not announced | 28–17 |
| 46 | February 8 | at Philadelphia 76ers | 102–109 | Dale Ellis (30) | | | The Spectrum; 11,224 | 28–18 |
All-Star Game
| 47 | February 14 | San Antonio Spurs | 129–113 | Xavier McDaniel (30) | | | Seattle Center Coliseum; 11,506 | 29–18 |
| 48 | February 15 | at Phoenix Suns | 112–135 | Dale Ellis (21) | | | Arizona Veterans Memorial Coliseum; 12,800 | 29–19 |
| 49 | February 17 | Washington Bullets | 126–112 | Derrick McKey (26) | | | Seattle Center Coliseum; 12,570 | 30–19 |
| 50 | February 18 | at Portland Trail Blazers | 116–115 | Xavier McDaniel (37) | | | Memorial Coliseum; 12,848 | 31–19 |
| 51 | February 21 | Boston Celtics | 96–91 | Dale Ellis (30) | | | Seattle Center Coliseum; 14,546 | 32–19 |
| 52 | February 25 | Sacramento Kings | 94–97 | Xavier McDaniel (26) | | | Seattle Center Coliseum; 11,780 | 32–20 |
| 53 | February 27 | at Sacramento Kings | 116–107 | Dale Ellis; Derrick McKey (27) | | | ARCO Arena (II); 16,517 | 33–20 |
| 54 | February 28 | Indiana Pacers | 106–108 | Dale Ellis (30) | | | Seattle Center Coliseum; Not announced | 33–21 |

March: 6–11 (home: 5–2; road: 1–9)

| Game | Date | Team | Score | High points | High rebounds | High assists | Location Attendance | Record |
|---|---|---|---|---|---|---|---|---|
| 55 | March 3 | Houston Rockets | 118–108 | Dale Ellis (39) | | | Seattle Center Coliseum; 14,415 | 34–21 |
| 56 | March 4 | Philadelphia 76ers | 118–104 | Xavier McDaniel (25) | | | Seattle Center Coliseum; 14,688 | 35–21 |
| 57 | March 7 | at Indiana Pacers | 110–92 | Dale Ellis (27) | | | Market Square Arena; Not announced | 36–21 |
| 58 | March 8 | at Detroit | L 96–112 | Derrick McKey (21) | | | The Palace of Auburn Hills; 21,454 | 36–22 |
| 59 | March 10 | at Milwaukee Bucks | 90–102 | Russ Schoene (18) | | | Bradley Center; 18,633 | 36–23 |
| 60 | March 11 | at Chicago Bulls | 88–105 | Dale Ellis (26) | | | Chicago Stadium; 18,291 | 36–24 |
| 61 | March 13 | at Washington Bullets | 101–106 | Dale Ellis (28) | | | Capital Centre; Not announced | 36–25 |
| 62 | March 14 | at New York Knicks | 110–116 | Xavier McDaniel (34) | | | Madison Square Garden (IV); 18,759 | 36–26 |
| 63 | March 16 | Charlotte Hornets | 108–88 | Dale Ellis (32) | | | Seattle Center Coliseum; Not announced | 37–26 |
| 64 | March 18 | at Phoenix Suns | 104–122 | Dale Ellis (29) | | | Arizona Veterans Memorial Coliseum; 14,471 | 37–27 |
| 65 | March 21 | Utah Jazz | 101–96 | Dale Ellis (31) | | | Seattle Center Coliseum; 14,500 | 38–27 |
| 66 | March 23 | Los Angeles Clippers | 115–112 | Dale Ellis (39) | | | Seattle Center Coliseum; 10,349 | 39–27 |
| 67 | March 25 | Chicago Bulls | 110–111 | Dale Ellis (30) | | | Seattle Center Coliseum; 14,810 | 39–28 |
| 68 | March 27 | at Utah Jazz | 105–124 | Dale Ellis; Xavier McDaniel (16) | | | Salt Palace; 12,444 | 39–29 |
| 69 | March 28 | at Houston Rockets | 117–120 | Dale Ellis (36) | | | The Summit; 16,611 | 39–30 |
| 70 | March 30 | at Denver Nuggets | 116–123 | Dale Ellis (26) | | | McNichols Sports Arena; 14,851 | 39–31 |
| 71 | March 31 | Detroit | L 108–111 | Dale Ellis (30) | | | Seattle Center Coliseum; 14,810 | 39–32 |

April: 8–3 (home: 4–2; road: 4–1)

| Game | Date | Team | Score | High points | High rebounds | High assists | Location Attendance | Record |
|---|---|---|---|---|---|---|---|---|
| 72 | April 4 | L.A. Lakers | L 97–115 | Dale Ellis; Derrick McKey (23) | | | Seattle Center Coliseum; 14,810 | 39–33 |
| 73 | April 6 | Phoenix Suns | 119–126 | Xavier McDaniel (37) | | | Seattle Center Coliseum; 14,457 | 39–34 |
| 74 | April 8 | at Dallas Mavericks | 114–90 | Dale Ellis (34) | | | Reunion Arena; 17,007 | 40–34 |
| 75 | April 10 | at San Antonio Spurs | 102–89 | Dale Ellis (28) | | | HemisFair Arena; 12,448 | 41–34 |
| 76 | April 13 | Miami Heat | 116–111 | Xavier McDaniel (35) | | | Seattle Center Coliseum; 11,267 | 42–34 |
| 77 | April 15 | Denver Nuggets | 125–92 | Dale Ellis (32) | | | Seattle Center Coliseum; 14,250 | 43–34 |
| 78 | April 17 | at Golden State Warriors | 116–109 (OT) | Derrick McKey (28) | | | Oakland—Alameda County Coliseum Arena; 15,025 | 44–34 |
| 79 | April 18 | Golden State Warriors | 122–118 | Xavier McDaniel; Dale Ellis (35) | | | Seattle Center Coliseum; 13,568 | 45–34 |
| 80 | April 20 | Portland Trail Blazers | 124–118 | Dale Ellis; Xavier McDaniel (31) | | | Seattle Center Coliseum; 14,320 | 46–34 |
| 81 | April 21 | at Los Angeles Clippers | 139–136 (OT) | Xavier McDaniel (30) | | | Los Angeles Memorial Sports Arena; 11,280 | 47–34 |
| 82 | April 23 | at L.A. Lakers | L 117–121 | Xavier McDaniel (39) | | | Great Western Forum; 17,505 | 47–35 |

1988–89 schedule

== Playoffs ==
1989 playoff game log
First round: 3–1 (home: 2–0; road: 1–1)

| Game | Date | Team | Score | High points | High rebounds | High assists | Location Attendance | Series |
|---|---|---|---|---|---|---|---|---|
| 1 | April 28 | Houston | W 111–107 | Dale Ellis (25) | Xavier McDaniel (11) | Nate McMillan (11) | Seattle Center Coliseum; 14,250 | 1–0 |
| 2 | April 30 | Houston | W 109–97 | Lister, McDaniel (20) | Olden Polynice (10) | Nate McMillan (8) | Seattle Center Coliseum; 12,887 | 2–0 |
| 3 | May 3 | @ Houston | L 107–126 | Dale Ellis (26) | Michael Cage (10) | Nate McMillan (10) | The Summit; 16,611 | 2–1 |
| 4 | May 5 | @ Houston | W 98–96 | Dale Ellis (26) | Xavier McDaniel (10) | Nate McMillan (10) | The Summit; 16,611 | 3–1 |

Conference Semi-finals: 0–4 (home: 0–2; road: 0–2)

| Game | Date | Team | Score | High points | High rebounds | High assists | Location Attendance | Series |
|---|---|---|---|---|---|---|---|---|
| 1 | May 7 | @ L.A. Lakers | L 102–113 | Derrick McKey (23) | Olden Polynice (10) | Nate McMillan (12) | Great Western Forum; 17,505 | 0–1 |
| 2 | May 10 | @ L.A. Lakers | L 108–130 | Xavier McDaniel (17) | Xavier McDaniel (8) | Sedale Threatt (9) | Great Western Forum; 17,505 | 0–2 |
| 3 | May 12 | L.A. Lakers | L 86–91 | Dale Ellis (30) | Xavier McDaniel (12) | Sedale Threatt (9) | Seattle Center Coliseum; 14,541 | 0–3 |
| 4 | May 14 | L.A. Lakers | L 95–97 | Xavier McDaniel (30) | Xavier McDaniel (11) | Nate McMillan (8) | Seattle Center Coliseum; 14,006 | 0–4 |

1989 schedule

== Player statistics ==
Note: PG= per game; M= Minutes; R= Rebounds; A= Assists; S = Steals; B = Blocks; P = Points; T = Turnovers; PF = Personal fouls

=== Season ===
| Player | Age | Games played | MPG | RPG | APG | SPG | BPG | TPG | PFPG | PPG |
|---|---|---|---|---|---|---|---|---|---|---|
| Greg Ballard | 34 | 2 | 7.5 | 3.5 | 0.0 | 0.0 | 0.0 | 0.0 | 1.5 | 3.0 |
| Michael Cage | 27 | 80 | 31.7 | 9.6 | 1.6 | 1.2 | 0.7 | 1.6 | 2.3 | 10.3 |
| Mike Champion | 24 | 2 | 2.0 | 0.0 | 0.0 | 0.0 | 0.0 | 0.5 | 1.0 | 0.0 |
| Dale Ellis | 28 | 82 | 38.9 | 4.2 | 2.0 | 1.3 | 0.3 | 2.7 | 2.4 | 27.5 |
| Avery Johnson | 23 | 43 | 6.8 | 0.6 | 1.7 | 0.5 | 0.1 | 0.4 | 0.8 | 1.6 |
| Alton Lister | 30 | 82 | 22.0 | 6.6 | 0.7 | 0.3 | 2.2 | 1.4 | 3.8 | 8.0 |
| John Lucas | 35 | 74 | 11.4 | 1.1 | 3.5 | 0.8 | 0.0 | 0.9 | 0.7 | 4.2 |
| Xavier McDaniel | 25 | 82 | 29.1 | 5.3 | 1.6 | 1.0 | 0.5 | 2.6 | 2.8 | 20.5 |
| Derrick McKey | 22 | 82 | 34.2 | 5.7 | 2.7 | 1.3 | 0.9 | 2.3 | 3.2 | 15.9 |
| Nate McMillan | 24 | 75 | 31.2 | 5.2 | 9.3 | 2.1 | 0.6 | 2.8 | 3.1 | 7.1 |
| Olden Polynice | 24 | 80 | 10.4 | 2.6 | 0.3 | 0.5 | 0.4 | 0.6 | 2.1 | 2.9 |
| Jerry Reynolds | 26 | 56 | 13.2 | 1.8 | 1.1 | 0.9 | 0.5 | 1.0 | 1.0 | 7.6 |
| Russ Schoene | 28 | 69 | 11.2 | 2.4 | 0.5 | 0.5 | 0.3 | 0.7 | 2.0 | 5.2 |
| Sedale Threatt | 27 | 63 | 19.4 | 1.9 | 3.8 | 1.3 | 0.1 | 1.2 | 2.5 | 8.6 |

=== Playoffs ===
| Player | Age | Games played | MPG | RPG | APG | SPG | BPG | TPG | PFPG | PPG |
|---|---|---|---|---|---|---|---|---|---|---|
| Michael Cage | 27 | 8 | 21.9 | 5.8 | 0.6 | 0.9 | 0.4 | 1.0 | 1.8 | 7.1 |
| Dale Ellis | 28 | 8 | 38.0 | 4.0 | 1.3 | 1.4 | 0.1 | 2.6 | 2.4 | 22.9 |
| Avery Johnson | 23 | 6 | 5.2 | 0.7 | 0.8 | 0.7 | 0.0 | 0.0 | 0.2 | 1.8 |
| Alton Lister | 30 | 8 | 20.0 | 4.8 | 0.3 | 0.3 | 2.6 | 1.1 | 3.5 | 7.0 |
| John Lucas | 35 | 4 | 9.3 | 0.3 | 2.0 | 0.0 | 0.0 | 0.5 | 1.3 | 2.8 |
| Xavier McDaniel | 25 | 8 | 35.1 | 8.4 | 2.8 | 0.3 | 0.6 | 2.8 | 3.8 | 18.8 |
| Derrick McKey | 22 | 8 | 35.8 | 6.5 | 2.3 | 0.8 | 1.9 | 2.9 | 4.1 | 13.3 |
| Nate McMillan | 24 | 8 | 25.0 | 3.1 | 7.9 | 1.3 | 0.6 | 2.4 | 2.6 | 6.8 |
| Olden Polynice | 24 | 8 | 20.3 | 7.8 | 0.1 | 0.8 | 0.5 | 0.6 | 4.0 | 7.1 |
| Jerry Reynolds | 26 | 4 | 10.0 | 1.3 | 0.3 | 0.5 | 1.5 | 1.0 | 1.5 | 5.5 |
| Russ Schoene | 28 | 3 | 14.3 | 1.7 | 0.7 | 0.7 | 0.0 | 0.0 | 2.3 | 4.3 |
| Sedale Threatt | 27 | 8 | 25.1 | 1.6 | 6.1 | 2.1 | 0.0 | 1.4 | 2.8 | 12.0 |

== Awards and records ==
1989 NBA All-Star Game selections (game played on February 12, 1989)

- Dale Ellis

Non All-Star Awards and records

- Dale Ellis, All-NBA Third Team
- Dale Ellis, January 8 Player of the Week
- Xavier McDaniel, April 23 Player of the Week

== Transactions ==
=== Free agents ===
==== Additions ====
| Date | Player | Signed | Former team |
|---|---|---|---|
| August 2, 1988 | Avery Johnson | Free agent | Palm Beach Stingrays |
| September 19, 1988 | John Lucas | Free agent | Milwaukee Bucks |
| October 4, 1988 | Mike Champion | Free agent | N/A (Undrafted) |
| February 13, 1989 | Greg Ballard | 10-day contract | Golden State Warriors |
| February 26, 1989 | Mike Champion | 10-day contract | N/A |

==== Subtractions ====
| Date | Player | Reason left | New team |
|---|---|---|---|
| October 25, 1988 | Mike Champion | Waived | N/A |
| October 31, 1988 | Danny Young | Waived | Portland Trail Blazers |
| October 31, 1988 | Corey Gaines | Waived | New Jersey Nets |

=== Trades ===
October 4, 1988
To Seattle SuperSonics----
- (United States) Jerry Reynolds
To Milwaukee Bucks----
- 1990 Second-Round Pick (Steve Henson)

Player Transactions Citation:

== See also ==
- 1988–89 NBA season
