= 1988–89 Milwaukee Bucks season =

NBA professional basketball team season

- Head coach: Del Harris
- General manager: Del Harris
- Owner: Herb Kohl
- Arena: Bradley Center

Results
- Record: 49–33 (.598)
- Place: Division: 4th (Central); Conference: 5th (Eastern)
- Playoff finish: Conference semifinals (lost to Pistons 0–4)
- Stats at Basketball Reference

Local media
- Television: WCGV-TV (Jim Paschke, Jon McGlocklin)
- Radio: WTMJ

The 1988–89 Milwaukee Bucks season was the 21st season for the Milwaukee Bucks in the National Basketball Association.

== Season summary ==
=== Off-season ===
For the season, the Bucks moved into their new arena known as the Bradley Center. The team had the 13th overall pick in the 1988 NBA draft, and selected shooting guard Jeff Grayer out of Iowa State University. During the off-season, the Bucks acquired Fred Roberts from the Miami Heat expansion team. Shortly before the regular season began, team owner Herb Kohl was elected to the first of four terms representing the United States Senate in Wisconsin.

=== Regular season ===
The Bucks struggled with a 3–4 start to the regular season, as Grayer only played just eleven games due to being diagnosed with the chicken pox, and suffering two knee injuries. However, the team soon recovered posting a six-game winning streak in January, and later on held a 30–15 record at the All-Star break. The Bucks finished in fourth place in the Central Division with a 49–33 record, and earned the fifth seed in the Eastern Conference; the team qualified for the NBA playoffs for the tenth consecutive year.

Terry Cummings averaged 22.9 points, 8.1 rebounds and 1.3 steals per game, and was named to the All-NBA Third Team, while sixth man Ricky Pierce averaged 17.6 points per game off the bench, and Jack Sikma provided the team with 13.4 points and 7.8 rebounds per game, and also led them with 82 three-point field goals. In addition, Larry Krystkowiak averaged 12.7 points and 7.6 rebounds per game, while Paul Pressey provided with 12.1 points, 6.6 assists and 1.8 steals per game, Sidney Moncrief also contributed 12.1 points per game, and Jay Humphries averaged 11.6 points, 5.5 assists and 1.9 steals per game. Meanwhile, Grayer contributed 7.4 points per game during his short 11-game stint, and Roberts provided with 5.9 points per game.

During the NBA All-Star weekend at the Houston Astrodome in Houston, Texas, Cummings was selected for the 1989 NBA All-Star Game, as a member of the Eastern Conference All-Star team; it was his second and final All-Star appearance. Cummings also finished tied in 17th place in Most Valuable Player voting, while Pierce finished tied in sixth place in Sixth Man of the Year voting, Krystkowiak finished tied in seventh place in Most Improved Player voting, and head coach Del Harris finished tied in seventh place in Coach of the Year voting.

The Bucks finished seventh in the NBA in home-game attendance, with an attendance of 700,984 at the Bradley Center during the regular season.

=== NBA playoffs ===
In the Eastern Conference First Round of the 1989 NBA playoffs, and for the second consecutive year, the Bucks faced off against the 4th–seeded Atlanta Hawks, who were led by the trio of All-Star forward Dominique Wilkins, All-Star center Moses Malone, and Reggie Theus. The Bucks lost Game 1 to the Hawks on the road, 100–92 at the Omni Coliseum, but managed to win the next two games, which included a Game 3 win over the Hawks at home in overtime, 117–113 at the Bradley Center to take a 2–1 series lead. However, the Bucks lost Game 4 to the Hawks at home in overtime, 113–106. With the series tied at 2–2, the Bucks won Game 5 over the Hawks at the Omni Coliseum, 96–92 to win in a hard-fought five-game series; this marked the last time the Bucks would advance to the second round of the NBA playoffs until the 2000–01 season.

In the Eastern Conference Semi-finals, the Bucks faced off against the top–seeded, and Central Division champion Detroit Pistons, who were led by the trio of All-Star guard Isiah Thomas, Joe Dumars and Bill Laimbeer. However, due to injuries to Cummings, Pressey and Krystkowiak, the Bucks lost the first two games to the Pistons on the road at The Palace of Auburn Hills, before losing their next two home games, including a Game 4 loss to the Pistons at the Bradley Center, 96–94, thus losing the series in a four-game sweep.

The Pistons would advance to the NBA Finals for the second consecutive year, and defeat the 2-time defending NBA champion Los Angeles Lakers in a four-game sweep in the 1989 NBA Finals, winning their first ever NBA championship in franchise history.

=== Aftermath ===
Following the season, Cummings was traded to the San Antonio Spurs, and Moncrief retired after ten seasons with the Bucks due to continuing knee problems.

== Draft picks ==
Round	Pick	Player	Position	Nationality	College
1	13	Jeff Grayer	SF/SG	United States	Iowa State
2	39	Tito Horford	C	Dominican Republic	Miami (FL)
3	63	Mike Jones		United States	Auburn

== Roster ==
1988–89 Milwaukee Bucks roster
Players

Pos.	No.	Player	Height	Weight	DOB	From
C	45	Randy Breuer	7 ft 3 in (2.21 m)	230 lb (104 kg)	1960–10–11	Minnesota
F	35	Tony Brown	6 ft 6 in (1.98 m)	185 lb (84 kg)	1960–07–29	Arkansas
F	34	Terry Cummings	6 ft 9 in (2.06 m)	220 lb (100 kg)	1961–03–15	DePaul
F	23	Mark Davis	6 ft 6 in (1.98 m)	195 lb (88 kg)	1963–06–08	Old Dominion
G	20	Jeff Grayer (injured)	6 ft 5 in (1.96 m)	200 lb (91 kg)	1965–12–17	Iowa State
G	11	Rickey Green	6 ft 0 in (1.83 m)	170 lb (77 kg)	1954–08–18	Michigan
C	50	Tito Horford	7 ft 1 in (2.16 m)	245 lb (111 kg)	1966–01–19	Miami (FL)
G	24	Jay Humphries	6 ft 3 in (1.91 m)	185 lb (84 kg)	1962–10–17	Colorado
F	42	Larry Krystkowiak	6 ft 9 in (2.06 m)	220 lb (100 kg)	1964–09–23	Montana
C	44	Paul Mokeski	7 ft 0 in (2.13 m)	250 lb (113 kg)	1957–01–03	Kansas
G	4	Sidney Moncrief	6 ft 3 in (1.91 m)	180 lb (82 kg)	1957–09–21	Arkansas
G	22	Ricky Pierce	6 ft 4 in (1.93 m)	205 lb (93 kg)	1959–08–19	Rice
F	25	Paul Pressey	6 ft 5 in (1.96 m)	185 lb (84 kg)	1958–12–24	Tulsa
F	31	Fred Roberts	6 ft 10 in (2.08 m)	218 lb (99 kg)	1960–08–14	BYU
C	43	Jack Sikma	6 ft 11 in (2.11 m)	230 lb (104 kg)	1955–11–14	Illinois Wesleyan

Coaches
Head coach
- Del Harris
Assistant(s)
- Mack Calvin
- Mike Dunleavy, Sr.
- Frank Hamblen

Legend
- (DP) Unsigned draft pick
- (FA) Free agent
- (S) Suspended
- Injured

== Regular season ==
=== Season standings ===
Central Division	W	L	PCT	GB	Home	Road	Div
y-Detroit Pistons	63	19	.768	–	37–4	26–15	20–10
x-Cleveland Cavaliers	57	25	.695	6	37–4	20–21	19–11
x-Atlanta Hawks	52	30	.634	11	33–8	19–22	20–10
x-Milwaukee Bucks	49	33	.598	14	31–10	18–23	11–19
x-Chicago Bulls	47	35	.573	16	30–11	17–24	12–18
Indiana Pacers	28	54	.341	35	20–21	8–33	8–22

#	Eastern Conference				
#	Team	W	L	PCT	GB
1	z-Detroit Pistons	63	19	.768	–
2	y-New York Knicks	52	30	.634	11
3	x-Cleveland Cavaliers	57	25	.695	6
4	x-Atlanta Hawks	52	30	.634	11
5	x-Milwaukee Bucks	49	33	.598	14
6	x-Chicago Bulls	47	35	.573	16
7	x-Philadelphia 76ers	46	36	.561	17
8	x-Boston Celtics	42	40	.512	21
9	Washington Bullets	40	42	.488	23
10	Indiana Pacers	28	54	.341	35
11	New Jersey Nets	26	56	.317	37
12	Charlotte Hornets	20	62	.244	43

z - clinched division title
y - clinched division title
x - clinched playoff spot

=== Game log ===
1988–89 game log
Total: 49–33 (home: 2–2; road: 0–0)
November: 6–5 (home: 5–2; road: 1–3)

Game	Date	Team	Score	High points	High rebounds	High assists	Location Attendance	Record
1	November 4	@ Indiana	W 117–103	Terry Cummings (26)	Jack Sikma (10)	Jay Humphries (5)	Market Square Arena	1–0
2	November 5	Atlanta	L 94–107	Terry Cummings (19)	Jack Sikma (10)	Ricky Pierce (5)	Bradley Center; 18,649	1–1
3	November 9	Philadelphia	W 114–103	Terry Cummings (31)	Larry Krystkowiak, Paul Pressey (7)	Jay Humphries (6)	Bradley Center; 14,192	2–1
4	November 12	Boston	W 108–100				Bradley Center; 18,673	3–1
5	November 17	New Jersey	L 96–105				Bradley Center; 15,419	3–2
6	November 19	@ Cleveland	L 99–106				Richfield Coliseum; 17,287	3–3
7	November 22	@ Indiana	L 91–105				Market Square Arena	3–4
8	November 23	Washington	W 124–102				Bradley Center; 15,102	4–4
9	November 25	@ Boston	L 96–115				Boston Garden; 14,890	4–5
10	November 26	Miami	W 103–93				Bradley Center; 18,573	5–5
11	November 29	Portland	W 119–114				Bradley Center; 13,918	6–5

December: 10–6 (home: 6–3; road: 4–3)

Game	Date	Team	Score	High points	High rebounds	High assists	Location Attendance	Record
12	December 1	Cleveland	L 96–99				Bradley Center; 14,215	6–6
13	December 2	@ New Jersey	W 103–92				Brendan Byrne Arena	7–6
14	December 6	Detroit	W 106–84				Bradley Center; 15,619	8–6
15	December 8	@ New York	L 109–113				Madison Square Garden; 14,356	8–7
16	December 9	@ Chicago	L 100–118				Chicago Stadium; 17,592	8–8
17	December 11	L. A. Lakers	W 95–94				Bradley Center; 18,633	9–8
18	December 13	@ Philadelphia	W 109–91				The Spectrum; 10,003	10–8
19	December 14	@ Detroit	W 119–110				The Palace of Auburn Hills; 21,454	11–8
20	December 16	@ Atlanta	L 112–115				The Omni; 14,379	11–9
21	December 17	Chicago	L 93–112				Bradley Center; 18,633	11–10
22	December 20	Charlotte	W 125–115				Bradley Center; 15,075	12–10
23	December 21	@ Charlotte	W 112–100				Charlotte Coliseum; 23,010	13–10
24	December 23	Dallas	W 113–101				Bradley Center; 18,633	14–10
25	December 27	Indiana	W 120–107				Bradley Center; 18,633	15–10
26	December 30	Atlanta	L 113–117				Bradley Center; 18,633	15–11

January: 11–3 (home: 5–0; road: 6–3)

Game	Date	Team	Score	High points	High rebounds	High assists	Location Attendance	Record
27	January 4	L. A. Clippers	W 110–102				Bradley Center; 15,287	16–11
28	January 6	@ Washington	W 128–121 2OT				Baltimore Arena	17–11
29	January 7	Utah	W 107–89				Bradley Center; 18,633	18–11
30	January 11	Denver	W 123–106				Bradley Center; 15,702	19–11
31	January 13	@ Miami	W 107–101				Miami Arena; 15,008	20–11
32	January 15	Detroit	W 120–112				Bradley Center; 18,633	21–11
33	January 17	@ Atlanta	L 98–111				The Omni; 15,387	21–12
34	January 18	Charlotte	W 118–106				Bradley Center; 16,145	22–12
35	January 20	@ Utah	L 96–98				Salt Palace; 12,444	22–13
36	January 21	@ Denver	W 116–107				McNichols Sports Arena; 17,022	23–13
37	January 24	@ Sacramento	W 114–110				ARCO Arena; 16,517	24–13
38	January 26	@ Portland	W 127–109				Memorial Coliseum; 12,848	25–13
39	January 28	@ L. A. Clippers						
40	January 29	@ Seattle						
41	January 31	Sacramento						

February: 7–4 (home: 5–1; road: 2–3)

Game	Date	Team	Score	High points	High rebounds	High assists	Location Attendance	Record
42	February 3	@ Indiana						
43	February 4	@ Washington						
44	February 7	Cleveland						
45	February 8	@ Detroit						
All-Star Break
46	February 14	New Jersey						
47	February 16	@ Chicago						
48	February 19	Chicago						
49	February 21	Indiana						
50	February 24	@ Boston						
51	February 25	Houston						
52	February 27	San Antonio						

March: 10–7 (home: 8–1; road: 2–6)

Game	Date	Team	Score	High points	High rebounds	High assists	Location Attendance	Record
53	March 1	New York						
54	March 3	@ Chicago						
55	March 5	@ Cleveland						
56	March 7	Washington						
57	March 10	Seattle						
58	March 11	Phoenix						
59	March 13	@ Dallas						
60	March 15	@ San Antonio						
61	March 16	@ Houston						
62	March 18	Detroit						
63	March 19	@ New York						
64	March 21	Boston						
65	March 23	@ Cleveland						
66	March 25	Cleveland						
67	March 27	Golden State						
68	March 29	Chicago						
69	March 31	@ Phoenix						

April: 5–8 (home: 2–3; road: 3–5)

Game	Date	Team	Score	High points	High rebounds	High assists	Location Attendance	Record
70	April 2	@ L. A. Lakers						
71	April 4	@ Golden State						
72	April 6	New York						
73	April 8	Philadelphia						
74	April 9	@ Detroit						
75	April 11	New Jersey						
76	April 12	@ Washington						
77	April 15	@ Atlanta						
78	April 16	@ New Jersey						
79	April 18	@ Philadelphia						
80	April 19	Atlanta						
81	April 21	@ Charlotte						
82	April 22	Indiana						

1988–89 schedule

== Playoffs ==
1989 playoff game log
First Round: 3–2 (home: 1–1; road: 2–1)

Game	Date	Team	Score	High points	High rebounds	High assists	Location Attendance	Series
1	April 27	@ Atlanta	L 92–100	Jay Humphries (20)	Terry Cummings (8)	Sidney Moncrief (6)	The Omni; 14,541	0–1
2	April 29	@ Atlanta	W 108–98	Terry Cummings (22)	Terry Cummings (8)	Jack Sikma (7)	The Omni; 15,742	1–1
3	May 2	Atlanta	W 117–113 (OT)	Ricky Pierce (35)	Terry Cummings (14)	Jay Humphries (10)	Bradley Center; 18,469	2–1
4	May 5	Atlanta	L 106–113 (OT)	Jack Sikma (24)	Larry Krystkowiak (10)	Jay Humphries (15)	Bradley Center; 18,633	2–2
5	May 7	@ Atlanta	W 96–92	Ricky Pierce (25)	Jack Sikma (9)	Jay Humphries (5)	The Omni; 16,220	3–2

Conference semifinals: 0–4 (home: 0–2; road: 0–2)

Game	Date	Team	Score	High points	High rebounds	High assists	Location Attendance	Series
1	May 10	@ Detroit	L 80–85	Ricky Pierce (25)	Sidney Moncrief (6)	Jay Humphries (6)	The Palace of Auburn Hills; 21,454	0–1
2	May 12	@ Detroit	L 92–112	Krystkowiak, Pierce (22)	Larry Krystkowiak (13)	Rickey Green (6)	The Palace of Auburn Hills; 21,454	0–2
3	May 14	Detroit	L 90–110	Ricky Pierce (22)	Randy Breuer (8)	Jay Humphries (5)	Bradley Center; 18,633	0–3
4	May 15	Detroit	L 94–96	Fred Roberts (33)	Randy Breuer (9)	Jay Humphries (14)	Bradley Center; 18,633	0–4

1989 schedule

== Player statistics ==
Legend
GP	Games played	GS	Games started	MPG	Minutes per game
FG%	Field-goal percentage	3P%	3-point field-goal percentage	FT%	Free-throw percentage
RPG	Rebounds per game	APG	Assists per game	SPG	Steals per game
BPG	Blocks per game	PPG	Points per game

=== Season ===
Player	GP	GS	MPG	FG%	3FG%	FT%	RPG	APG	SPG	BPG	PPG
Terry Cummings	80	78	35.3	46.7	46.7	78.7	8.1	2.5	1.3	0.9	22.9
Ricky Pierce	75	4	27.7	51.8	22.2	85.9	2.6	2.1	1.0	0.3	17.6
Jack Sikma	80	80	32.3	43.1	38.0	90.5	7.8	3.6	1.1	0.8	13.4
Larry Krystkowiak	80	77	30.9	47.3	33.3	82.3	7.6	1.3	1.2	0.1	12.7
Paul Pressey	67	62	32.4	47.4	21.8	77.6	3.9	6.6	1.8	0.7	12.1
Sidney Moncrief	62	50	25.7	49.1	34.2	86.5	2.8	3.0	1.0	0.2	12.1
Jay Humphries	73	50	30.4	48.3	26.6	81.6	2.6	5.5	1.9	0.1	11.6
Jeff Grayer	11	2	18.2	43.8	0.0	85.0	3.2	2.0	0.9	0.1	7.4
Fred Roberts	71	3	17.6	48.6	21.4	80.6	2.9	0.9	0.5	0.3	5.9
Rickey Green	30	0	16.7	54.5	33.3	89.5	1.5	3.5	0.7	0.1	5.4
Randy Breuer	48	4	10.7	48.0	0.0	54.9	2.8	0.5	0.2	0.8	4.2
Mark Davis	31	0	8.1	49.5	11.1	81.3	1.2	0.5	0.4	0.2	4.0
Tony Brown	29	0	9.4	49.3	28.6	78.3	1.0	0.7	0.4	0.1	3.2
Paul Mokeski	74	0	9.3	36.0	26.9	78.4	2.5	0.5	0.4	0.3	2.2
Tito Horford	25	0	4.5	32.6	0.0	63.2	0.9	0.1	0.0	0.3	1.7
Andre Turner	4	0	3.3	50.0	0.0	0.0	0.8	0.0	0.5	0.0	1.5
Mike Dunleavy	2	0	2.5	50.0	50.0	0.0	0.0	0.0	0.0	0.0	1.5

=== Playoffs ===
Player	GP	GS	MPG	FG%	3FG%	FT%	RPG	APG	SPG	BPG	PPG
Ricky Pierce	9	0	32.4	54.6	75.0	87.2	2.8	2.8	1.2	0.2	22.3
Fred Roberts	9	5	38.3	49.0	0.0	85.0	4.3	2.2	0.6	0.4	14.7
Jay Humphries	9	9	35.9	49.5	16.7	88.2	3.0	7.8	0.9	0.0	14.6
Terry Cummings	5	4	24.8	36.2	0.0	87.5	6.6	1.4	0.6	0.0	12.8
Jack Sikma	9	9	33.4	39.4	28.6	82.1	5.6	3.3	0.9	0.4	11.7
Larry Krystkowiak	8	8	29.9	42.6	0.0	87.1	5.6	1.5	0.3	0.1	10.6
Sidney Moncrief	9	9	20.4	39.6	28.6	93.8	2.9	1.4	0.6	0.2	6.1
Paul Mokeski	5	0	12.2	57.1	100.0	75.0	3.4	0.6	0.0	0.0	4.6
Randy Breuer	9	1	18.0	53.1	0.0	38.5	4.4	0.6	0.2	0.7	4.3
Rickey Green	8	0	13.8	41.4	50.0	100.0	1.6	2.3	0.6	0.0	3.6
Tony Brown	6	0	11.5	36.4	0.0	75.0	1.2	1.0	0.3	0.0	1.8

Player statistics citation:

== Awards and records ==
- Terry Cummings, All-NBA Third Team

== Transactions ==
=== Trades ===
June 23, 1988
October 4, 1988
To Milwaukee Bucks----
- Fred Roberts
To Milwaukee Bucks----
- 1990 2nd round pick (Steve Henson)
To Miami Heat----
- 1989 2nd round pick (Scott Haffner)
To Seattle SuperSonics----
- Jerry Reynolds

=== Free agents ===
Player	Signed	Former team
Mark Davis	May 19, 1988	La Crosse Catbirds
Jim Les	October 19, 1988	Chicago Express
Rickey Green	March 1, 1989	Charlotte Hornets

Subtractions
Player	Date signed	New team
John Stroeder	Expansion Draft June 23, 1988	Miami Heat
Jim Les	October 20, 1988	Utah Jazz

Player Transactions Citation:

== See also ==
- 1988-89 NBA season
