= 1988–89 Philadelphia 76ers season =

NBA professional basketball team season

- Head coach: Jim Lynam
- General manager: John Nash
- Owner: Harold Katz
- Arena: The Spectrum

Results
- Record: 46–36 (.561)
- Place: Division: 2nd (Atlantic); Conference: 7th (Eastern)
- Playoff finish: First round (lost to Knicks 0–3)
- Stats at Basketball Reference

Local media
- Television: WPHL-TV (Neil Funk, Steve Mix); PRISM (Jim Barniak, Matt Guokas)
- Radio: WIP

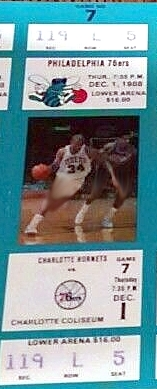
A ticket for a December 1988 game between the 76ers and the Hornets.

The 1988–89 Philadelphia 76ers season was the 40th season for the Philadelphia 76ers in the National Basketball Association, and their 26th season in Philadelphia, Pennsylvania.

== Season summary ==
=== Off-season ===
Despite finishing with a 36–46 record the previous season, the 76ers received the third overall pick in the 1988 NBA draft, and selected power forward Charles D. Smith from the University of Pittsburgh; however, the team soon traded Smith to the Los Angeles Clippers in exchange for rookie shooting guard, and first-round draft pick Hersey Hawkins out of Bradley University, as the 76ers needed more backcourt scoring to complement the inside play of All-Star forward Charles Barkley. During the off-season, the team acquired Ron Anderson from the Indiana Pacers, and signed free agent and undrafted rookie point guard Scott Brooks.

=== Regular season ===
With the addition of Hawkins and Anderson, the 76ers won 10 of their first 15 games of the regular season in November, but then struggled losing 9 of their 14 games in December. With starting small forward Cliff Robinson out for the remainder of the season due to a knee injury after only just 14 games, the team signed free agents, rookie small forward Shelton Jones, and Derek Smith, who was previously released by the Sacramento Kings. The 76ers held a 26–20 record at the All-Star break, and won four of their final five games of the season, finishing in second place in the Atlantic Division with a 46–36 record, earning the seventh seed in the Eastern Conference, and returning to the NBA playoffs after a one-year absence.

Barkley averaged 25.8 points, 12.5 rebounds, 4.1 assists and 1.6 steals per game, and was named to the All-NBA First Team, while Mike Gminski averaged 17.2 points, 9.4 rebounds and 1 3 blocks per game, and Anderson played a sixth man role off the bench, averaging 16.2 points and 5.0 rebounds per game. In addition, Hawkins provided the team with 15.1 points and 1.5 steals per game, and was named to the NBA All-Rookie First Team, while Robinson contributed 15.1 points and 5.4 rebounds per game, and Maurice Cheeks provided with 11.6 points, 7.8 assists and 1.5 steals per game. Meanwhile, Smith averaged 7.8 points per game in 36 games, while Gerald Henderson contributed 6.5 points per game, Brooks provided with 5.2 points and 3.7 assists per game, and Jones averaged 5.0 points per game in 42 games.

During the NBA All-Star weekend at the Houston Astrodome in Houston, Texas, Barkley was selected for the 1989 NBA All-Star Game, as a member of the Eastern Conference All-Star team. Meanwhile, Henderson participated in the NBA Three-Point Shootout, and Jones participated in the NBA Slam Dunk Contest. Barkley also finished in sixth place in Most Valuable Player voting, while Anderson finished tied in sixth place in Sixth Man of the Year voting, and also finished tied in fourth place in Most Improved Player voting.

The 76ers finished 15th in the NBA in home-game attendance, with an attendance of 531,715 at The Spectrum during the regular season.

=== NBA playoffs ===
In the Eastern Conference First Round of the 1989 NBA playoffs, the 76ers faced off against the 2nd–seeded, and Atlantic Division champion New York Knicks, who were led by All-Star center Patrick Ewing, All-Star guard Mark Jackson, and Charles Oakley. The 76ers lost the first two games to the Knicks on the road at Madison Square Garden. Game 2 was notable, because the 76ers blew a 10-point lead with approximately two minutes left in the game, as Knicks guard Trent Tucker's three-point shot with less than 10 seconds left gave New York the win at home, 107–106. The 76ers lost Game 3 to the Knicks at home in overtime, 116–115 at The Spectrum, thus losing the series in a three-game sweep.

=== Aftermath ===
Following the season, Cheeks and David Wingate were both traded to the San Antonio Spurs, while Robinson and Henderson were both released to free agency, and Jones was left unprotected in the 1989 NBA expansion draft, where he was selected by the Minnesota Timberwolves expansion team.

== Draft picks ==
Round	Pick	Player	Position	Nationality	School/Club team
1	3	Charles Smith	PF	United States	Pittsburgh
2	44	Everette Stephens	PG	United States	Purdue
3	57	Hernán Montenegro	C	Argentina	Olimpo (Argentina)

== Roster ==
1988–89 Philadelphia 76ers roster
Players

Pos.	No.	Player	Height	Weight	DOB	From
F	20	Ron Anderson	6 ft 7 in (2.01 m)	215 lb (98 kg)	1958–10–15	Fresno State
F	34	Charles Barkley	6 ft 6 in (1.98 m)	252 lb (114 kg)	1963–02–20	Auburn
G	1	Scott Brooks	5 ft 11 in (1.80 m)	165 lb (75 kg)	1965–07–31	UC Irvine
G	10	Maurice Cheeks	6 ft 1 in (1.85 m)	180 lb (82 kg)	1956–09–08	West Texas A&M
F	54	Ben Coleman	6 ft 9 in (2.06 m)	235 lb (107 kg)	1961–11–14	Maryland
C	42	Mike Gminski	6 ft 11 in (2.11 m)	250 lb (113 kg)	1959–08–03	Duke
G	33	Hersey Hawkins	6 ft 3 in (1.91 m)	190 lb (86 kg)	1966–09–29	Bradley
G	12	Gerald Henderson	6 ft 2 in (1.88 m)	175 lb (79 kg)	1956–01–16	VCU
F	31	Shelton Jones	6 ft 9 in (2.06 m)	210 lb (95 kg)	1966–04–06	St. John's
F	4	Cliff Robinson	6 ft 9 in (2.06 m)	220 lb (100 kg)	1960–05–13	USC
C	41	Jim Rowinski	6 ft 8 in (2.03 m)	250 lb (113 kg)	1961–01–04	Purdue
G	21	Derek Smith	6 ft 6 in (1.98 m)	205 lb (93 kg)	1961–11–01	Louisville
F	45	Bob Thornton	6 ft 10 in (2.08 m)	225 lb (102 kg)	1962–07–10	UC Irvine
C	44	Chris Welp	7 ft 0 in (2.13 m)	245 lb (111 kg)	1964–01–02	Washington
G	25	David Wingate	6 ft 5 in (1.96 m)	185 lb (84 kg)	1963–12–15	Georgetown

Coaches
Head coach
- Jim Lynam
Assistant(s)
- Buzz Braman
- Fred Carter

Legend
- (DP) Unsigned draft pick
- (FA) Free agent
- (S) Suspended
- Injured

Roster
Updated: April 20, 1989

== Regular season ==
=== Season standings ===
Atlantic Division	W	L	PCT	GB	Home	Road	Div
y-New York Knicks	52	30	.634	–	35–6	17–24	18–12
x-Philadelphia 76ers	46	36	.561	6	30–11	16–25	19–11
x-Boston Celtics	42	40	.512	10	32–9	10–31	19–11
Washington Bullets	40	42	.488	12	30–11	10–31	17–13
New Jersey Nets	26	56	.317	26	17–24	9–32	9–21
Charlotte Hornets	20	62	.244	32	12–29	8–33	8–22

#	Eastern Conference				
#	Team	W	L	PCT	GB
1	z-Detroit Pistons	63	19	.768	–
2	y-New York Knicks	52	30	.634	11
3	x-Cleveland Cavaliers	57	25	.695	6
4	x-Atlanta Hawks	52	30	.634	11
5	x-Milwaukee Bucks	49	33	.598	14
6	x-Chicago Bulls	47	35	.573	16
7	x-Philadelphia 76ers	46	36	.561	17
8	x-Boston Celtics	42	40	.512	21
9	Washington Bullets	40	42	.488	23
10	Indiana Pacers	28	54	.341	35
11	New Jersey Nets	26	56	.317	37
12	Charlotte Hornets	20	62	.244	43

z - clinched division title
y - clinched division title
x - clinched playoff spot

== Game log ==
=== Regular season ===
1988–89 game log
Total: 46–36 (home: 29–12; road: 17–24)
November: 10–5 (home: 9–2; road: 1–3)

Game	Date	Team	Score	High points	High rebounds	High assists	Location Attendance	Record
1	November 4	L.A. Clippers						
2	November 5	Boston						
3	November 8	Detroit						
4	November 9	@ Milwaukee						
5	November 11	Atlanta						
6	November 15	@ Chicago						
7	November 16	Chicago						
8	November 18	New York						
9	November 19	@ New York						
10	November 22	@ Washington						
11	November 23	Cleveland						
12	November 25	Charlotte						
13	November 26	Indiana						
14	November 28	L.A. Lakers						
15	November 30	Portland						

December: 5–9 (home: 3–2; road: 2–7)

Game	Date	Team	Score	High points	High rebounds	High assists	Location Attendance	Record
16	December 1	@ Charlotte						
17	December 3	@ Indiana						
18	December 7	Denver						
19	December 9	@ Boston						
20	December 10	@ Detroit						
21	December 13	Milwaukee						
22	December 14	@ Atlanta						
23	December 16	@ New Jersey						
24	December 17	Utah						
25	December 20	Dallas						
26	December 25	Washington						
27	December 27	@ Golden State						
28	December 28	@ L.A. Lakers						
29	December 30	@ Utah						

January: 9–5 (home: 5–1; road: 4–4)

Game	Date	Team	Score	High points	High rebounds	High assists	Location Attendance	Record
30	January 5	@ San Antonio						
31	January 7	@ Houston						
32	January 9	@ Dallas						
33	January 11	New Jersey						
34	January 13	Atlanta						
35	January 15	@ Charlotte						
36	January 16	Charlotte						
37	January 18	Boston						
38	January 20	@ Boston						
39	January 21	@ Washington						
40	January 25	Chicago						
41	January 27	Golden State						
42	January 28	@ New Jersey						
43	January 31	@ Cleveland						

February: 6–5 (home: 3–2; road: 3–3)

Game	Date	Team	Score	High points	High rebounds	High assists	Location Attendance	Record
44	February 1	Washington						
45	February 3	Detroit						
46	February 8	Seattle						
All-Star Break
47	February 14	@ Indiana						
48	February 15	Indiana						
49	February 17	New Jersey						
50	February 18	@ Cleveland						
51	February 22	@ Miami						
52	February 24	@ Phoenix						
53	February 26	@ Denver						
54	February 28	@ L.A. Clippers						

March: 9–7 (home: 6–3; road: 3–4)

Game	Date	Team	Score	High points	High rebounds	High assists	Location Attendance	Record
55	March 1	@ Sacramento						
56	March 3	@ Portland						
57	March 4	@ Seattle						
58	March 6	Phoenix						
59	March 7	@ Chicago						
60	March 9	Sacramento						
61	March 11	Detroit						
62	March 15	New Jersey						
63	March 16	@ New York						
64	March 18	@ Washington						
65	March 20	New York						
66	March 22	Cleveland						
67	March 24	San Antonio						
68	March 26	@ Boston						
69	March 28	Boston						
70	March 31	Miami						

April: 6–6 (home: 3–2; road: 3–4)

Game	Date	Team	Score	High points	High rebounds	High assists	Location Attendance	Record
71	April 2	Houston						
72	April 4	@ New York						
73	April 5	@ Atlanta						
74	April 7	@ Charlotte						
75	April 8	@ Milwaukee						
76	April 11	@ Cleveland						
77	April 14	Charlotte						
78	April 16	New York						
79	April 18	Milwaukee						
80	April 20	@ New Jersey						
81	April 21	@ Detroit						
82	April 23	Washington						

1988–89 schedule

== Playoffs ==
1989 playoff game log
First Round: 0–3 (home: 0–1; road: 0–2)

Game	Date	Team	Score	High points	High rebounds	High assists	Location Attendance	Series
1	April 27	@ New York	L 96–102	Ron Anderson (26)	Charles Barkley (12)	Maurice Cheeks (16)	Madison Square Garden; 19,591	0–1
2	April 29	@ New York	L 106–107	Charles Barkley (30)	Charles Barkley (12)	Maurice Cheeks (12)	Madison Square Garden; 19,591	0–2
3	May 2	New York	L 115–116 (OT)	Charles Barkley (29)	Charles Barkley (11)	Maurice Cheeks (11)	Spectrum; 16,236	0–3

1989 schedule

== Player statistics ==
Legend
GP	Games played	GS	Games started	MPG	Minutes per game
FG%	Field-goal percentage	3P%	3-point field-goal percentage	FT%	Free-throw percentage
RPG	Rebounds per game	APG	Assists per game	SPG	Steals per game
BPG	Blocks per game	PPG	Points per game

== Awards and records ==
- Charles Barkley, All-NBA First Team
- Hersey Hawkins, NBA All-Rookie Team 1st Team

== See also ==
- 1988-89 NBA season
