= Greg Butler (basketball) =

American basketball player (born 1966)

Personal information
- Born: March 11, 1966 (age 60) Inglewood, California, U.S.
- Listed height: 6 ft 11 in (2.11 m)
- Listed weight: 240 lb (109 kg)

Career information
- High school: Rolling Hills (Rolling Hills Estates, California)
- College: Stanford (1984–1988)
- NBA draft: 1988: 2nd round, 37th overall pick
- Drafted by: New York Knicks
- Position: Center
- Number: 54, 45

Career history
- 1988–1990: New York Knicks
- 1990: Los Angeles Clippers
- 1991: New Haven Skyhawks
- 1991–1992: Bakersfield Jammers
- Stats at NBA.com
- Stats at Basketball Reference

Gregory Edward Butler (born March 11, 1966), is an American former professional basketball player who was selected by the New York Knicks in the 2nd round (37th overall) of the 1988 NBA draft. A 6'11" center from Stanford University, Butler played in 3 NBA seasons from 1988 to 1991. He played for the Knicks and Los Angeles Clippers.

In his NBA career, Butler played in 55 games and scored a total of 76 points.

He later played in Portugal for Ovarense Aerosoles.

Butler's older brother, Dave, played for Stanford's rival, California, and later played professionally in Turkey and Japan.

== Career statistics ==
Legend
GP	Games played	GS	Games started	MPG	Minutes per game
FG%	Field goal percentage	3P%	3-point field goal percentage	FT%	Free throw percentage
RPG	Rebounds per game	APG	Assists per game	SPG	Steals per game
BPG	Blocks per game	PPG	Points per game	**Bold**	Career high

=== NBA ===
==== Regular season ====
Year	Team	GP	GS	MPG	FG%	3P%	FT%	RPG	APG	SPG	BPG	PPG
1988–89	New York	**33**	0	**4.2**	**.417**	.000	**.800**	.8	**.1**	.0	**.1**	**1.7**
1989–90	New York	13	0	2.5	.250	–	.000	.7	**.1**	.0	.0	.5
1990–91	L.A. Clippers	9	0	4.1	.263	–	.667	**1.8**	**.1**	.0	.0	1.6
Career		55	0	3.8	.354	.000	.714	1.0	.1	.0	.0	1.4
