= 1988–89 Charlotte Hornets season =

NBA professional basketball team season

- Head coach: Dick Harter
- General manager: Carl Scheer
- Owner: George Shinn
- Arena: Charlotte Coliseum

Results
- Record: 20–62 (.244)
- Place: Division: 6th (Atlantic); Conference: 12th (Eastern)
- Playoff finish: Did not qualify
- Stats at Basketball Reference

Local media
- Television: WCCB (Gary Sparber, Mike Pratt)
- Radio: WBT (Steve Martin, Gil McGregor)

The 1988–89 Charlotte Hornets season was the inaugural season for the Charlotte Hornets in the National Basketball Association. The "Charlotte Hornets", along with the Miami Heat, joined the NBA as expansion teams during the 1988–89 season; the team was originally going to be named the "Spirit", but later on changed it to the "Hornets".

== Season summary ==
=== Off-season ===
The Hornets revealed their new primary logo, adding teal, blue, purple, green and white to their color scheme. The team's primary logo featured a teal hornet with blue eyes and blue stripes bouncing an orange basketball, surrounded by the city and team name in teal letters; the hornet also has a blue letter "H" on its chest underneath the city name "Charlotte" in white letters. The team also revealed new white home uniforms with teal, blue, green and purple pinstripes, and new teal road uniforms with white, blue, green and purple pinstripes; both uniforms featured a teal, purple and blue trim, while the home uniforms featured teal side panels on the bottom of their shorts, and the road uniforms featured white side panels.

The team's new primary logo would remain in use until 2002, while the new uniforms would last until 1997, where they added side panels and additional pinstripes to their jerseys. The Hornets played their home games at the Charlotte Coliseum in Charlotte, North Carolina.

In the 1988 NBA expansion draft, the Hornets selected veteran players like Dell Curry, second-year guard Muggsy Bogues, Mike Holton, Dave Hoppen, Rickey Green, and Mike Brown, who was then traded to the Utah Jazz in exchange for Kelly Tripucka. The team also signed free agents, Kurt Rambis, who won four NBA championships with the Los Angeles Lakers, Earl Cureton, Tim Kempton and Brian Rowsom, and acquired Robert Reid from the Houston Rockets. The Hornets received the eighth overall pick in the 1988 NBA draft, and selected shooting guard Rex Chapman from the University of Kentucky, and hired Dick Harter as their first ever head coach.

=== Regular season ===
The Hornets made their NBA regular season debut on November 4, 1988, in which the team lost to the Cleveland Cavaliers at home, 133–93 at the Charlotte Coliseum; Tripucka and Rambis both led the team with 16 points each. After losing their first two games of the season, the Hornets defeated the Los Angeles Clippers at the Charlotte Coliseum, 117–105 on November 8; it was the team's first ever win in franchise history. Tripucka scored 24 points along with 3 steals, while Chapman scored 18 points off the bench, and Rambis had a double-double of 17 points and 14 rebounds.

The Hornets struggled losing ten of their first twelve games of the regular season, and held an 8–19 record at the end of December. The team lost 10 of their 13 games in January, and later on held a 13–35 record at the All-Star break. The Hornets posted two nine-game losing streaks between February and March, and between March and April; the team lost 13 of their 16 games in March, and lost 20 of 22 games between February 28 and April 10, 1989. In March, the team signed free agents Sidney Lowe and Greg Kite; Kite was previously released by the Clippers. The Hornets finished their inaugural season in last place in the Atlantic Division with a record of 20 wins and 62 losses.

Tripucka led the Hornets in scoring averaging 22.6 points per game, while Chapman averaged 16.9 points per game, and was named to the NBA All-Rookie Second Team, and Reid provided the team with 14.7 points per game. In addition, Rambis provided with 11.1 points, 9.4 rebounds and 1.3 steals per game, while Curry contributed 11.9 points per game, but only played just 48 games due to a wrist injury, and Holton provided with 8.3 points and 6.3 assists per game. Meanwhile, Cureton averaged 6.5 points and 6.0 rebounds per game, Rowsom contributed 6.6 points and 4.0 rebounds per game, but only appeared in just 34 games due to injury, Hoppen provided with 6.5 points and 5.0 rebounds per game, Kempton averaged 6.1 points and 3.8 rebounds per game, and Bogues contributed 5.4 points, 7.8 assists and 1.4 steals per game. Tripucka also finished tied in fourth place in Most Improved Player voting.

The Hornets led the NBA in home-game attendance, becoming the first expansion team to do so, with an attendance of 949,858 at the Charlotte Coliseum during the regular season; it was also an all-time NBA attendance record, which would be broken by one of the two next season's expansion teams, the Minnesota Timberwolves the following season.

=== Notable highlights ===
One notable highlight of the inaugural season occurred on December 23, 1988, in which the Hornets defeated All-Star guard, and former University of North Carolina star Michael Jordan, and the Chicago Bulls at the Charlotte Coliseum by a score of 103–101, in front of a sellout crowd of 23,388 fans in attendance. With the score tied at 101–101, Rambis made a game-winning layup from Reid's missed shot at the buzzer; Tripucka scored 30 points while Jordan scored 33 points along with 6 steals.

== Offseason ==
=== Expansion draft ===
The team's roster was filled as a result of an expansion draft in 1988. In a coin flip, the Hornets earned the right to choose either the higher choice in the college draft or the first pick in the expansion draft, picking the former. Most teams use such drafts to pick young players and guarantee a future, but Charlotte chose veterans in order to get a competitive lineup right away.

Pick	Player	Position	Nationality	Former Team
2	Dell Curry	Guard-Forward	United States	Cleveland Cavaliers
4	Dave Hoppen	Center-Forward	United States	Golden State Warriors
6	Tyrone Bogues	Point Guard	United States	Washington Bullets
8	Mike Brown^{a}	Forward-center	United States	Chicago Bulls
10	Rickey Green	Point Guard	United States	Utah Jazz
12	Michael Holton	Point Guard	United States	Portland Trail Blazers
14	Michael Brooks^{b}	Small Forward	United States	Denver Nuggets
16	Bernard Thompson^{c}	Guard-Forward	United States	Phoenix Suns
18	Ralph Lewis	Guard-Forward	United States	Detroit Pistons
20	Clinton Wheeler^{d}	Point Guard	United States	Indiana Pacers
22	Sedric Toney^{b}	Point Guard	United States	New York Knicks

- Traded for Kelly Tripucka from the Utah Jazz
- Waived before the season.
- Traded for Robert Reid from the Houston Rockets.
- Sent to Portland Trail Blazers.

Also sent were Kurt Rambis of the Los Angeles Lakers and Earl Cureton of the Philadelphia 76ers.

=== NBA draft ===
Subsequent to the expansion draft, the Hornets were given the eighth overall pick in the 1988 NBA draft. They selected Rex Chapman, a shooting guard from the University of Kentucky.

Round	Pick	Player	Position	Nationality	School/Club team
1	8	Rex Chapman	Shooting Guard	United States	Kentucky
2	34	Tom Tolbert	Forward/center	United States	Arizona
3	53	Jeff Moore	Power Forward	United States	Tennessee State

== Roster ==
1988–89 Charlotte Hornets roster
Players

Pos.	No.	Player	Height	Weight	DOB	From
G	1	Muggsy Bogues	5 ft 3 in (1.60 m)	136 lb (62 kg)	1965–01–09	Wake Forest
G	3	Rex Chapman	6 ft 4 in (1.93 m)	185 lb (84 kg)	1967–10–05	Kentucky
C	25	Earl Cureton	6 ft 9 in (2.06 m)	210 lb (95 kg)	1957–09–03	Detroit Mercy
G	30	Dell Curry	6 ft 4 in (1.93 m)	190 lb (86 kg)	1964–06–25	Virginia Tech
G	6	Michael Holton	6 ft 4 in (1.93 m)	185 lb (84 kg)	1961–08–04	UCLA
C	42	Dave Hoppen	6 ft 11 in (2.11 m)	235 lb (107 kg)	1964–03–13	Nebraska
F	41	Tim Kempton	6 ft 10 in (2.08 m)	245 lb (111 kg)	1964–01–25	Notre Dame
C	32	Greg Kite	6 ft 11 in (2.11 m)	250 lb (113 kg)	1961–08–05	BYU
F	31	Kurt Rambis	6 ft 8 in (2.03 m)	213 lb (97 kg)	1958–02–25	Santa Clara
F	50	Robert Reid	6 ft 8 in (2.03 m)	205 lb (93 kg)	1955–08–30	St. Mary's (Texas)
F	32	Brian Rowsom	6 ft 9 in (2.06 m)	220 lb (100 kg)	1965–10–23	UNC Wilmington
F	7	Kelly Tripucka	6 ft 6 in (1.98 m)	220 lb (100 kg)	1959–02–16	Notre Dame

Coaches
Head coach
- Dick Harter
Assistant(s)
- Ed Badger
- Gene Littles

Legend
- (DP) Unsigned draft pick
- (FA) Free agent
- (S) Suspended
- Injured

Roster
Updated: March 29, 1989

== Preseason ==
The Hornets' first official NBA game took place on October 14, 1988, at the Madison Square Garden, and was a 118–97 preseason loss to the New Jersey Nets.

== Regular season ==
The Hornets played their first season in the Eastern Conference's Atlantic Division. The team's first regular season NBA game took place on November 4, 1988, at the Charlotte Coliseum, and was a 133–93 loss to the Cleveland Cavaliers. Despite the huge loss, the Hornets received a standing ovation at the end of the game. November 8, 1988, the team won their first game over the Los Angeles Clippers, 117–105. On December 23, 1988, the Hornets defeated Michael Jordan and the Chicago Bulls 103–101 at the buzzer in Jordan's first return to North Carolina as a professional. During the season, Kelly Tripucka led the franchise with 22.6 points per game. Despite the Hornets mostly poor play (typical for an expansion franchise), the Hornets led the NBA in attendance during the season, selling out 36 of 41 home games (including the final 30).

=== Season standings ===
Atlantic Division	W	L	PCT	GB	Home	Road	Div
y-New York Knicks	52	30	.634	–	35–6	17–24	18–12
x-Philadelphia 76ers	46	36	.561	6	30–11	16–25	19–11
x-Boston Celtics	42	40	.512	10	32–9	10–31	19–11
Washington Bullets	40	42	.488	12	30–11	10–31	17–13
New Jersey Nets	26	56	.317	26	17–24	9–32	9–21
Charlotte Hornets	20	62	.244	32	12–29	8–33	8–22

#	Eastern Conference				
#	Team	W	L	PCT	GB
1	z-Detroit Pistons	63	19	.768	–
2	y-New York Knicks	52	30	.634	11
3	x-Cleveland Cavaliers	57	25	.695	6
4	x-Atlanta Hawks	52	30	.634	11
5	x-Milwaukee Bucks	49	33	.598	14
6	x-Chicago Bulls	47	35	.573	16
7	x-Philadelphia 76ers	46	36	.561	17
8	x-Boston Celtics	42	40	.512	21
9	Washington Bullets	40	42	.488	23
10	Indiana Pacers	28	54	.341	35
11	New Jersey Nets	26	56	.317	37
12	Charlotte Hornets	20	62	.244	43

z – clinched division title
y – clinched division title
x – clinched playoff spot

=== Game log ===
1988–89 Game Log (20–62) (Home: 12–29; Road: 8–33)
November (3–10) (Home: 2–4; Road: 1–6)

Game	Date	Opponent	Score	Location	Attendance	Record
1	November 4, 1988	Cleveland	L 93–133	Charlotte Coliseum	23,338	0–1
2	November 5, 1988	@ Detroit	L 85–94	The Palace of Auburn Hills	21,454	0–2
3	November 8, 1988	L.A. Clippers	W 117–105	Charlotte Coliseum	18,865	1–2
4	November 11, 1988	@ Washington	L 87–96	Capital Centre	12,731	1–3
5	November 12, 1988	@ Atlanta	L 111–132	The Omni	16,155	1–4
6	November 15, 1988	New Jersey	L 99–106	Charlotte Coliseum	21,748	1–5
7	November 17, 1988	@ Dallas	L 93–105	Reunion Arena	16,512	1–6
8	November 19, 1988	@ San Antonio	W 107–105	HemisFair Arena	10,863	2–6
9	November 22, 1988	Detroit	L 93–99	Charlotte Coliseum	23,388	2–7
10	November 23, 1988	@ Boston	L 109–114	Boston Garden	14,890	2–8
11	November 25, 1988	@ Philadelphia	L 116–123	Spectrum	10,588	2–9
12	November 26, 1988	Washington	L 113–120	Charlotte Coliseum	23,388	2–10
13	November 29, 1988	Miami	W 99–84	Charlotte Coliseum	23,388	3–10

December (5–9) (Home: 5–3; Road: 0–6)

Game	Date	Opponent	Score	Location	Attendance	Record
14	December 1, 1988	Philadelphia	W 109–107	Charlotte Coliseum	21,716	4–10
15	December 3, 1988	@ Houston	L 104–108	The Summit	16,611	4–11
16	December 9, 1988	New Jersey	W 96–95	Charlotte Coliseum	23,388	5–11
17	December 10, 1988	@ New Jersey	L 112–121 (OT)	Brendan Byrne Arena		5–12
18	December 13, 1988	@ Indiana	L 104–115	Market Square Arena		5–13
19	December 14, 1988	Indiana	W 115–106	Charlotte Coliseum	22,601	6–13
20	December 16, 1988	Dallas	L 98–107	Charlotte Coliseum	23,388	6–14
21	December 17, 1988	@ Detroit	L 91–100	The Palace of Auburn Hills	21,454	6–15
22	December 20, 1988	@ Milwaukee	L 115–125	Bradley Center	15,075	6–16
23	December 21, 1988	Milwaukee	L 100–112	Charlotte Coliseum	23,010	6–17
24	December 23, 1988	Chicago	W 103–101	Charlotte Coliseum	23,388	7–17
25	December 26, 1988	Houston	L 95–97	Charlotte Coliseum	23,388	7–18
26	December 28, 1988	@ Cleveland	L 98–122	Richfield Coliseum	17,353	7–19
27	December 30, 1988	New York	W 122–111	Charlotte Coliseum	23,388	8–19

January (3–13) (Home: 1–5; Road: 2–8)

Game	Date	Opponent	Score	Location	Attendance	Record
28	January 3, 1989	New Jersey	L 106–109	Charlotte Coliseum	23,388	8–20
29	January 4, 1989	@ Washington	L 86–109	Capital Centre		8–21
30	January 6, 1989	@ Boston	L 92–115	Boston Garden	14,890	8–22
31	January 7, 1989	Washington	W 107–104	Charlotte Coliseum	23,388	9–22
32	January 9, 1989	Utah	L 92–114	Charlotte Coliseum	23,388	9–23
33	January 11, 1989	Chicago	L 101–106	Charlotte Coliseum	23,388	9–24
34	January 12, 1989	@ New York	L 89–106	Madison Square Garden	16,943	9–25
35	January 15, 1989	Philadelphia	L 109–116	Charlotte Coliseum	23,388	9–26
36	January 16, 1989	@ Philadelphia	W 127–122 (OT)	Spectrum	10,116	10–26
37	January 18, 1989	@ Milwaukee	L 106–118	Bradley Center	16,145	10–27
38	January 19, 1989	Phoenix	L 112–126	Charlotte Coliseum	23,388	10–28
39	January 21, 1989	@ Atlanta	L 113–137	The Omni	16,371	10–29
40	January 24, 1989	@ Phoenix	L 103–106	Arizona Veterans Memorial Coliseum	11,089	10–30
41	January 26, 1989	@ Utah	W 89–88	Salt Palace	12,444	11–30
42	January 27, 1989	@ L.A. Lakers	L 97–114	Great Western Forum	17,505	11–31
43	January 30, 1989	@ Portland	L 118–130	Memorial Coliseum	12,848	11–32

February (4–8) (Home: 4–5; Road: 0–3)

Game	Date	Opponent	Score	Location	Attendance	Record
44	February 1, 1989	Boston	L 94–107	Charlotte Coliseum	23,388	11–33
45	February 3, 1989	Seattle	W 108–106	Charlotte Coliseum	23,388	12–33
46	February 5, 1989	Cleveland	L 91–110	Charlotte Coliseum	23,388	12–34
47	February 7, 1989	@ Chicago	L 93–118	Chicago Stadium	17,385	12–35
48	February 9, 1989	Atlanta	W 110–108	Charlotte Coliseum	23,388	13–35
49	February 14, 1989	New York	L 117–129	Charlotte Coliseum	23,388	13–36
50	February 17, 1989	@ Miami	L 102–103	Miami Arena	15,008	13–37
51	February 18, 1989	Indiana	W 119–114	Charlotte Coliseum	23,388	14–37
52	February 22, 1989	Chicago	L 102–130	Charlotte Coliseum	23,388	14–38
53	February 23, 1989	@ New York	L 114–139	Madison Square Garden	16,130	14–39
54	February 25, 1989	San Antonio	W 124–113	Charlotte Coliseum	23,388	15–39
55	February 28, 1989	Boston	L 87–112	Charlotte Coliseum	23,388	15–40

March (2–13) (Home: 0–7; Road: 2–6)

Game	Date	Opponent	Score	Location	Attendance	Record
56	March 2, 1989	@ New Jersey	L 103–114	Brendan Byrne Arena		15–41
57	March 3, 1989	@ Atlanta	L 109–133	The Omni	16,371	15–42
58	March 5, 1989	@ Washington	L 101–114	Capital Centre	6,661	15–43
59	March 8, 1989	Denver	L 99–112	Charlotte Coliseum	23,388	15–44
60	March 10, 1989	L.A. Lakers	L 90–123	Charlotte Coliseum	23,388	15–45
61	March 12, 1989	Sacramento	L 105–114	Charlotte Coliseum	23,388	15–46
62	March 14, 1989	@ Denver	L 102–125	McNichols Sports Arena	10,522	15–47
63	March 16, 1989	@ Seattle	L 88–108	Seattle Center Coliseum		15–48
64	March 17, 1989	@ L.A. Clippers	W 108–105	Los Angeles Memorial Sports Arena	10,758	16–48
65	March 19, 1989	@ Golden State	L 117–124	Oakland–Alameda County Coliseum Arena	15,025	16–49
66	March 20, 1989	@ Sacramento	W 117–110	ARCO Arena	16,517	17–49
67	March 23, 1989	Washington	L 97–102	Charlotte Coliseum	23,388	17–50
68	March 25, 1989	Detroit	L 101–113	Charlotte Coliseum	23,388	17–51
69	March 27, 1989	New York	L 105–121	Charlotte Coliseum	23,388	17–52
70	March 30, 1989	Golden State	L 104–113	Charlotte Coliseum	23,388	17–53

April (3–9) (Home: 0–5; Road: 3–4)

Game	Date	Opponent	Score	Location	Attendance	Record
71	April 1, 1989	Portland	L 121–125 (OT)	Charlotte Coliseum	23,388	17–54
72	April 4, 1989	@ Chicago	L 101–121	Chicago Stadium	17,578	17–55
73	April 7, 1989	Philadelphia	L 108–118	Charlotte Coliseum	23,388	17–56
74	April 9, 1989	@ Cleveland	L 116–122	Richfield Coliseum	19,276	17–57
75	April 10, 1989	Atlanta	L 105–112	Charlotte Coliseum	23,388	17–58
76	April 12, 1989	@ New York	W 104–99	Madison Square Garden	18,385	18–58
77	April 14, 1989	@ Philadelphia	W 119–115	Spectrum	14,321	19–58
78	April 15, 1989	@ Indiana	L 105–115	Market Square Arena	11,860	19–59
79	April 17, 1989	Boston	L 108–113 (OT)	Charlotte Coliseum	23,388	19–60
80	April 18, 1989	@ New Jersey	W 121–105	Brendan Byrne Arena		20–60
81	April 21, 1989	Milwaukee	L 110–117	Charlotte Coliseum	23,388	20–61
82	April 23, 1989	@ Boston	L 110–120	Boston Garden	14,890	20–62

1988-89 Schedule

== Player statistics ==
=== Ragular season ===
Player	POS	GP	GS	MP	REB	AST	STL	BLK	PTS	MPG	RPG	APG	SPG	BPG	PPG
Robert Reid	SF	82	54	2,152	302	153	53	20	1,207	26.2	3.7	1.9	.6	.2	14.7
Earl Cureton	C	82	41	2,047	488	130	50	61	532	25.0	6.0	1.6	.6	.7	6.5
Muggsy Bogues	PG	79	21	1,755	165	620	111	7	423	22.2	2.1	7.8	1.4	.1	5.4
Tim Kempton	PF	79	0	1,341	304	102	41	14	484	17.0	3.8	1.3	.5	.2	6.1
Dave Hoppen	C	77	36	1,419	384	57	25	21	500	18.4	5.0	.7	.3	.3	6.5
Kurt Rambis	PF	75	75	2,233	703	159	100	57	832	29.8	9.4	2.1	1.3	.8	11.1
Rex Chapman	SG	75	44	2,219	187	176	70	25	1,267	29.6	2.5	2.3	.9	.3	16.9
Kelly Tripucka	SF	71	65	2,302	267	224	88	16	1,606	32.4	3.8	3.2	1.2	.2	22.6
Michael Holton	PG	67	60	1,696	105	424	66	12	553	25.3	1.6	6.3	1.0	.2	8.3
Dell Curry	SG	48	0	813	104	50	42	4	571	16.9	2.2	1.0	.9	.1	11.9
Ralph Lewis	SF	42	0	336	61	15	11	3	136	8.0	1.5	.4	.3	.1	3.2
Brian Rowsom	PF	34	0	517	137	24	10	12	226	15.2	4.0	.7	.3	.4	6.6
Rickey Green^{†}	PG	33	2	370	23	82	18	0	128	11.2	.7	2.5	.5	.0	3.9
Sidney Lowe	SG	14	0	250	34	93	14	0	23	17.9	2.4	6.6	1.0	.0	1.6
Tom Tolbert	SF	14	0	117	21	7	2	4	40	8.4	1.5	.5	.1	.3	2.9
Greg Kite^{†}	C	12	12	213	53	7	4	8	38	17.8	4.4	.6	.3	.7	3.2

- ^{†} Denotes player spent time with another team in the season. Stats reflect time with the Hornets only.

== Awards and records ==
- Rex Chapman, NBA All-Rookie Team 2nd Team

== Transactions ==
- July 1, 1988

Released Clinton Wheeler.

- July 18, 1988

Signed Earl Cureton as a free agent.

Traded Bernard Thompson to the Houston Rockets for Robert Reid and a 1990 2nd round draft pick (Steve Scheffler was later selected).

- July 28, 1988

Signed Kurt Rambis as an unrestricted free agent.

- August 17, 1988

Signed Tim Kempton as a free agent.

- October 6, 1988

Signed Brian Rowsom as a free agent.

- October 17, 1988

Released Sedric Toney.

- December 30, 1988

Waived Tom Tolbert.

- February 22, 1989

Waived Rickey Green.

- March 27, 1989

Signed Sidney Lowe to the first of two 10-day contracts.

- March 29, 1989

Signed Greg Kite to a contract for the rest of the season.

Waived Ralph Lewis.

Player Transactions Citation:
