= 1988–89 New York Knicks season =

Season of National Basketball Association team the New York Knicks

- Division champions
- Head coach: Rick Pitino
- President: Richard Evans
- General manager: Al Bianchi
- Owners: Gulf+Western
- Arena: Madison Square Garden

Results
- Record: 52–30 (.634)
- Place: Division: 1st (Atlantic); Conference: 2nd (Eastern)
- Playoff finish: East Conference semifinals (lost to Bulls 2–4)
- Stats at Basketball Reference

Local media
- Television: WWOR-TV; MSG Network (Marv Albert, John Andariese)
- Radio: WFAN (Jim Karvellas, Ernie Grunfeld)

The 1988–89 New York Knicks season was the 43rd season for the team in the National Basketball Association.

== Season summary ==
=== Off-season ===
During the off-season, and before draft day, the Knicks acquired Charles Oakley from the Chicago Bulls. The team had the 19th overall pick in the 1988 NBA draft, and selected point guard Rod Strickland out of DePaul University.

=== Regular season ===
In the regular season, and with the addition of Oakley and Strickland, the Knicks posted a six-game winning streak in December, won 18 of their first 25 games, and later on held a 32–16 record at the All-Star break. At mid-season, the team traded their future first-round draft pick to the Portland Trail Blazers in exchange for All-Star forward Kiki Vandeweghe. The Knicks posted another six-game winning streak between January and February, and finished in first place in the Atlantic Division with a 52–30 record, earning the second seed in the Eastern Conference; the team won their first Division title since the 1970–71 season, and also posted a successful 35–6 home record at Madison Square Garden during the season.

Patrick Ewing averaged 22.7 points, 9.3 rebounds, 1.5 steals and 3.5 blocks per game, and was named to the All-NBA Second Team, and to the NBA All-Defensive Second Team, while second-year guard Mark Jackson averaged 16.9 points, 8.6 assists and 1.9 steals per game along with 81 three-point field goals, and Johnny Newman provided the team with 16.0 points and 1.4 steals per game, plus 97 three-point field goals. In addition, Gerald Wilkins contributed 14.3 points and 1.4 steals per game, and Oakley provided the Knicks with 12.9 points, 10.5 rebounds and 1.3 steals per game. Off the bench, Vandeweghe contributed 9.2 points per game in 27 games after the trade, while Strickland provided 8.9 points and 3.9 assists per game, and was named to the NBA All-Rookie Second Team, three-point specialist Trent Tucker contributed 8.5 points per game, and led the Knicks with 118 three-point field goals, Sidney Green averaged 6.3 points and 4.8 rebounds per game, and Kenny Walker provided 5.3 points and 2.9 rebounds per game.

During the NBA All-Star weekend at the Houston Astrodome in Houston, Texas, Ewing and Jackson were both selected for the 1989 NBA All-Star Game, as members of the Eastern Conference All-Star team; it was Jackson's first and only All-Star appearance. Meanwhile, Walker won the NBA Slam Dunk Contest, and Tucker was selected to participate in the NBA Three-Point Shootout, but withdrew due to an illness in his family, and was replaced with Jon Sundvold of the Miami Heat. Ewing finished in fourth place in Most Valuable Player voting, finished in sixth place in Defensive Player of the Year voting, and also finished tied in seventh place in Most Improved Player voting, while head coach Rick Pitino finished in sixth place in Coach of the Year voting.

The Knicks finished third in the NBA in home-game attendance, with an attendance of 746,851 at Madison Square Garden during the regular season.

=== NBA playoffs ===
In the Eastern Conference First Round of the 1989 NBA playoffs, the Knicks faced off against the 7th–seeded Philadelphia 76ers, a team that featured All-Star forward Charles Barkley, Mike Gminski, and sixth man Ron Anderson. The Knicks won their first two home games over the 76ers at Madison Square Garden. In Game 2, and with the 76ers up by 10 points with two minutes left in the fourth quarter, the Knicks caught up as Tucker hit a three-pointer with less than 10 seconds left; the Knicks defeated the 76ers by a score of 107–106. The Knicks then won Game 3 over the 76ers on the road in overtime, 116–115 at The Spectrum to win the series in a three-game sweep, and advance to the Eastern Conference Semi-finals.

In the Semi-finals, the team faced off against the 6th–seeded Chicago Bulls, who were led by All-Star guard Michael Jordan, and second-year stars Scottie Pippen and Horace Grant. With the series tied at one game each, the Bulls won the next two games to take a 3–1 series lead, defeating the Knicks in Game 4 at Chicago Stadium, 106–93. After winning Game 5 at home, 121–114, the Knicks then lost Game 6 to the Bulls on the road, 113–111, thus losing the series in six games.

=== Aftermath ===
Following the season, Pitino resigned after two seasons with the Knicks, and became the head coach at the University of Kentucky, and Green was left unprotected in the 1989 NBA expansion draft, where he was selected by the Orlando Magic expansion team.

== Draft picks ==
Round	Pick	Player	Position	Nationality	School/Club team
1	19	Rod Strickland	PG	United States	DePaul
2	37	Greg Butler	C	United States	Stanford
3	69	Phil Stinnie	F	United States	Virginia Commonwealth

== Roster ==
1988–89 New York Knicks roster
Players

Pos.	No.	Player	Height	Weight	DOB	From
C	54	Greg Butler	6 ft 11 in (2.11 m)	240 lb (109 kg)	1966–03–11	Stanford
C	33	Patrick Ewing	7 ft 0 in (2.13 m)	240 lb (109 kg)	1962–08–05	Georgetown
F	44	Sidney Green	6 ft 9 in (2.06 m)	220 lb (100 kg)	1961–01–04	UNLV
G	13	Mark Jackson	6 ft 1 in (1.85 m)	180 lb (82 kg)	1965–04–01	St. John's
G	8	Pete Myers	6 ft 6 in (1.98 m)	180 lb (82 kg)	1963–09–15	Arkansas
F	4	Johnny Newman	6 ft 7 in (2.01 m)	190 lb (86 kg)	1963–11–28	Richmond
F	34	Charles Oakley	6 ft 8 in (2.03 m)	225 lb (102 kg)	1963–12–18	Virginia Union
G	11	Rod Strickland	6 ft 3 in (1.91 m)	175 lb (79 kg)	1966–07–11	DePaul
G	6	Trent Tucker	6 ft 5 in (1.96 m)	193 lb (88 kg)	1959–12–20	Minnesota
F	55	Kiki Vandeweghe	6 ft 8 in (2.03 m)	220 lb (100 kg)	1958–08–01	UCLA
F	7	Kenny Walker	6 ft 8 in (2.03 m)	210 lb (95 kg)	1964–08–18	Kentucky
C	45	Eddie Lee Wilkins	6 ft 10 in (2.08 m)	220 lb (100 kg)	1962–05–07	Gardner–Webb
G	21	Gerald Wilkins	6 ft 6 in (1.98 m)	185 lb (84 kg)	1963–09–11	Chattanooga

Coaches
Head coach
- Rick Pitino
Assistant(s)
- Stu Jackson
- Jim O'Brien
- Ralph Willard

Legend
- (DP) Unsigned draft pick
- (FA) Free agent
- (S) Suspended
- Injured

== Regular season ==
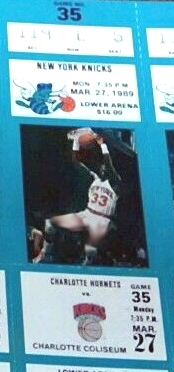
A ticket for a March 1989 game between the Knicks and the Charlotte Hornets.

=== Season standings ===
Atlantic Division	W	L	PCT	GB	Home	Road	Div
y-New York Knicks	52	30	.634	–	35–6	17–24	18–12
x-Philadelphia 76ers	46	36	.561	6	30–11	16–25	19–11
x-Boston Celtics	42	40	.512	10	32–9	10–31	19–11
Washington Bullets	40	42	.488	12	30–11	10–31	17–13
New Jersey Nets	26	56	.317	26	17–24	9–32	9–21
Charlotte Hornets	20	62	.244	32	12–29	8–33	8–22

#	Eastern Conference				
#	Team	W	L	PCT	GB
1	z-Detroit Pistons	63	19	.768	–
2	y-New York Knicks	52	30	.634	11
3	x-Cleveland Cavaliers	57	25	.695	6
4	x-Atlanta Hawks	52	30	.634	11
5	x-Milwaukee Bucks	49	33	.598	14
6	x-Chicago Bulls	47	35	.573	16
7	x-Philadelphia 76ers	46	36	.561	17
8	x-Boston Celtics	42	40	.512	21
9	Washington Bullets	40	42	.488	23
10	Indiana Pacers	28	54	.341	35
11	New Jersey Nets	26	56	.317	37
12	Charlotte Hornets	20	62	.244	43

z – clinched division title
y – clinched division title
x – clinched playoff spot

== Game log ==
=== Regular season ===
1988–89 game log
Total: 52–30 (home: 35–6; road: 17–24)
November: 9–5 (home: 4–1; road: 5–4)

Game	Date	Team	Score	High points	High rebounds	High assists	Location Attendance	Record
1	November 4	@ Boston						
2	November 5	@ New Jersey						
3	November 8	Chicago	W 126–117				Madison Square Garden	1–2
4	November 9	@ Washington						
5	November 11	@ Indiana						
6	November 12	Washington						
7	November 15	@ Houston						
8	November 18	@ Philadelphia						
9	November 19	Philadelphia					Madison Square Garden	
10	November 22	L.A. Lakers	L 98–110				Madison Square Garden	6–4
11	November 23	@ Detroit	W 133–111				Palace of Auburn Hills	7–4
12	November 26	Cleveland	W 127–112				Madison Square Garden	8–4
13	November 29	@ Denver						
14	November 30	@ L.A. Clippers						

December: 9–5 (home: 8–0; road: 1–5)

Game	Date	Team	Score	High points	High rebounds	High assists	Location Attendance	Record
15	December 2	@ Dallas						
16	December 3	@ San Antonio						
17	December 6	Denver					Madison Square Garden	
18	December 8	Milwaukee	W 113–109				Madison Square Garden	12–6
19	December 10	Sacramento						
20	December 13	New Jersey						
21	December 15	Utah					Madison Square Garden	
22	December 17	Washington						
23	December 18	@ Boston						
24	December 20	Indiana						
25	December 22	Detroit	W 88–85				Madison Square Garden	18–7
26	December 27	@ Atlanta	L 126–128				The Omni	18–8
27	December 29	@ Chicago	L 106–108				Chicago Stadium	18–9
28	December 30	@ Charlotte						

January: 10–6 (home: 6–0; road: 4–6)

Game	Date	Team	Score	High points	High rebounds	High assists	Location Attendance	Record
29	January 3	Boston					Madison Square Garden	
30	January 4	@ New Jersey						
31	January 7	@ Cleveland	L 96–104				Richfield Coliseum	20–11
32	January 8	L.A. Clippers						
33	January 11	@ Detroit	W 100–93				Palace of Auburn Hills	22–11
34	January 12	Charlotte						
35	January 14	Atlanta	W 132–122				Madison Square Garden	24–11
36	January 16	San Antonio						
37	January 18	@ Golden State	L 119–133				Oakland-Alameda County Coliseum Arena	25–12
38	January 19	@ Sacramento						
39	January 21	@ Seattle	L 119–121				Seattle Center Coliseum	25–14
40	January 22	@ Portland						
41	January 24	@ L.A. Lakers	W 122–117				Great Western Forum	27–14
42	January 27	@ Phoenix	L 130–132				Arizona Veterans Memorial Coliseum	27–15
43	January 28	@ Utah						
44	January 31	Indiana						

February: 9–2 (home: 6–0; road: 3–2)

Game	Date	Team	Score	High points	High rebounds	High assists	Location Attendance	Record
45	February 2	Cleveland	W 125–109				Madison Square Garden	29–16
46	February 4	@ Indiana						
47	February 7	Washington						
48	February 8	@ Atlanta	W 113–101				The Omni	32–16
49	February 14	@ Charlotte						
50	February 15	@ Cleveland	L 107–129				Richfield Coliseum	33–17
51	February 18	New Jersey						
52	February 21	Houston					Madison Square Garden	
53	February 23	Charlotte						
54	February 24	@ Washington						
55	February 26	Boston					Madison Square Garden	

March: 10–7 (home: 8–3; road: 2–4)

Game	Date	Team	Score	High points	High rebounds	High assists	Location Attendance	Record
56	March 1	@ Milwaukee	L 111–121				Bradley Center	37–19
57	March 2	Miami						
58	March 4	Chicago	W 122–104				Madison Square Garden	39–19
59	March 7	Phoenix	W 124–119				Madison Square Garden	40–19
60	March 11	Indiana						
61	March 14	Seattle	W 116–110				Madison Square Garden	42–19
62	March 16	Philadelphia					Madison Square Garden	
63	March 17	@ Chicago	L 124–129				Chicago Stadium	42–21
64	March 19	Milwaukee	W 128–104				Madison Square Garden	43–21
65	March 20	@ Philadelphia						
66	March 22	@ Miami						
67	March 24	@ Boston						
68	March 25	Atlanta	L 108–115				Madison Square Garden	44–24
69	March 27	@ Charlotte						
70	March 28	Portland					Madison Square Garden	
71	March 30	Dallas						
72	March 31	Golden State	L 114–134				Madison Square Garden	47–25

April: 5–5 (home: 3–2; road: 2–3)

Game	Date	Team	Score	High points	High rebounds	High assists	Location Attendance	Record
73	April 4	Philadelphia					Madison Square Garden	
74	April 6	@ Milwaukee	W 112–99				Bradley Center	48–26
75	April 7	@ New Jersey						
76	April 9	@ Washington						
77	April 12	Charlotte						
78	April 14	Detroit	W 104–100				Madison Square Garden	50–38
79	April 16	@ Philadelphia						
80	April 17	@ Chicago	L 100–104				Chicago Stadium	50–30
81	April 20	Boston						
82	April 22	New Jersey						

1988–89 schedule

=== Playoffs ===
1989 playoff game log
First Round: 3–0 (home: 2–0; road: 1–0)

Game	Date	Team	Score	High points	High rebounds	High assists	Location Attendance	Series
1	April 27	Philadelphia	W 102–96	Gerald Wilkins (34)	Charles Oakley (12)	Mark Jackson (9)	Madison Square Garden; 19,591	1–0
2	April 29	Philadelphia	W 107–106	Johnny Newman (20)	Charles Oakley (12)	Mark Jackson (10)	Madison Square Garden; 19,591	2–0
3	May 2	@ Philadelphia	W 116–115 (OT)	Mark Jackson (24)	Charles Oakley (17)	Mark Jackson (9)	Spectrum; 16,236	3–0

Conference semifinals: 2–4 (home: 2–1; road: 0–3)

Game	Date	Team	Score	High points	High rebounds	High assists	Location Attendance	Series
1	May 9	Chicago	L 109–120 (OT)	Johnny Newman (27)	Patrick Ewing (10)	Mark Jackson (11)	Madison Square Garden; 19,591	0–1
2	May 11	Chicago	W 114–97	Patrick Ewing (23)	Charles Oakley (13)	Mark Jackson (16)	Madison Square Garden; 19,591	1–1
3	May 13	@ Chicago	L 88–111	Patrick Ewing (19)	Charles Oakley (9)	Mark Jackson (6)	Chicago Stadium; 18,599	1–2
4	May 14	@ Chicago	L 93–106	Johnny Newman (23)	Charles Oakley (16)	Gerald Wilkins (5)	Chicago Stadium; 18,637	1–3
5	May 16	Chicago	W 121–114	Patrick Ewing (32)	Charles Oakley (13)	Mark Jackson (14)	Madison Square Garden; 19,591	2–3
6	May 19	@ Chicago	L 111–113	three players tied (22)	Patrick Ewing (13)	Mark Jackson (12)	Chicago Stadium; 18,676	2–4

1989 schedule

== Player statistics ==
=== Regular season ===
Player	POS	GP	GS	MP	REB	AST	STL	BLK	PTS	MPG	RPG	APG	SPG	BPG	PPG
Charles Oakley	PF	82	82	2,604	861	187	104	14	1,061	31.8	10.5	2.3	1.3	.2	12.9
Sidney Green	PF	82	0	1,277	394	76	47	18	517	15.6	4.8	.9	.6	.2	6.3
Johnny Newman	SF	81	80	2,336	206	162	111	23	1,293	28.8	2.5	2.0	1.4	.3	16.0
Gerald Wilkins	SG	81	58	2,414	244	274	115	22	1,161	29.8	3.0	3.4	1.4	.3	14.3
Trent Tucker	SG	81	24	1,824	176	132	88	6	687	22.5	2.2	1.6	1.1	.1	8.5
Rod Strickland	PG	81	10	1,358	160	319	98	3	721	16.8	2.0	3.9	1.2	.0	8.9
Patrick Ewing	C	80	80	2,896	740	188	117	281	1,815	36.2	9.3	2.4	1.5	3.5	22.7
Kenny Walker	SF	79	2	1,163	230	36	41	45	419	14.7	2.9	.5	.5	.6	5.3
Mark Jackson	PG	72	72	2,477	341	619	139	7	1,219	34.4	4.7	8.6	1.9	.1	16.9
Eddie Lee Wilkins	C	71	2	584	148	7	10	16	289	8.2	2.1	.1	.1	.2	4.1
Greg Butler	C	33	0	140	28	2	1	2	56	4.2	.8	.1	.0	.1	1.7
Pete Myers^{†}	SG	29	0	230	23	46	17	2	81	7.9	.8	1.6	.6	.1	2.8
Kiki VanDeWeghe^{†}	PF	27	0	502	36	35	12	7	248	18.6	1.3	1.3	.4	.3	9.2

=== Playoffs ===
Player	POS	GP	GS	MP	REB	AST	STL	BLK	PTS	MPG	RPG	APG	SPG	BPG	PPG
Patrick Ewing	C	9	9	340	90	20	9	18	179	37.8	10.0	2.2	1.0	2.0	19.9
Mark Jackson	PG	9	9	336	31	91	10	3	132	37.3	3.4	10.1	1.1	.3	14.7
Charles Oakley	PF	9	9	299	101	11	12	1	87	33.2	11.2	1.2	1.3	.1	9.7
Gerald Wilkins	SG	9	9	290	33	42	12	3	145	32.2	3.7	4.7	1.3	.3	16.1
Johnny Newman	SF	9	9	258	25	17	8	1	145	28.7	2.8	1.9	.9	.1	16.1
Kiki VanDeWeghe	PF	9	0	159	11	7	3	2	73	17.7	1.2	.8	.3	.2	8.1
Trent Tucker	SG	9	0	159	19	14	10	2	71	17.7	2.1	1.6	1.1	.2	7.9
Sidney Green	PF	9	0	128	36	5	2	1	36	14.2	4.0	.6	.2	.1	4.0
Rod Strickland	PG	9	0	111	13	25	4	1	54	12.3	1.4	2.8	.4	.1	6.0
Kenny Walker	SF	9	0	90	16	2	1	3	20	10.0	1.8	.2	.1	.3	2.2
Eddie Lee Wilkins	C	7	0	26	11	0	0	0	15	3.7	1.6	.0	.0	.0	2.1
Pete Myers	SG	4	0	14	3	1	0	1	4	3.5	.8	.3	.0	.3	1.0

- ^{†} Denotes player spent time with another team in the season. Stats reflect time with the Knicks only.

== Awards and records ==
- Patrick Ewing, All-NBA Second Team
- Patrick Ewing, NBA All-Defensive Second Team
- Rod Strickland, NBA All-Rookie Team 2nd Team
