= Rickey Green =

American basketball player (born 1954)

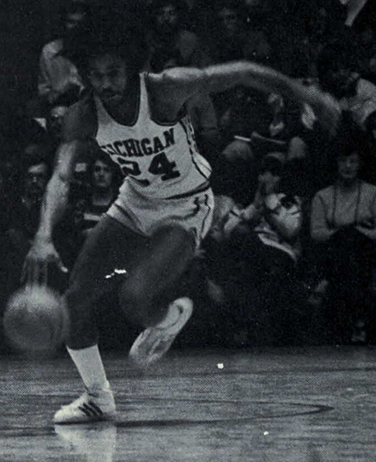
- Green from 1976 Michiganensian

Personal information
- Born: August 18, 1954 (age 72) Chicago, Illinois, U.S.
- Listed height: 6 ft 0 in (1.83 m)
- Listed weight: 170 lb (77 kg)

Career information
- High school: Hirsch Metropolitan (Chicago, Illinois)
- College: Vincennes (1973–1975); Michigan (1975–1977)
- NBA draft: 1977: 1st round, 16th overall pick
- Drafted by: Golden State Warriors
- Playing career: 1977–1992
- Position: Point guard
- Number: 25, 24, 14, 11, 12, 9, 13

Career history
- 1977–1978: Golden State Warriors
- 1978: Detroit Pistons
- 1979–1980: Hawaii Volcanos
- 1980–1988: Utah Jazz
- 1988–1989: Charlotte Hornets
- 1989: Milwaukee Bucks
- 1989–1990: Indiana Pacers
- 1990–1991: Philadelphia 76ers
- 1991–1992: Boston Celtics

Career highlights
- NBA All-Star (1984); NBA steals leader (1984); Consensus first-team All-American (1977); 2× First-team All-Big Ten (1976, 1977)

Career NBA statistics
- Points: 8,870 (9.4 ppg)
- Assists: 5,221 (5.5 apg)
- Steals: 1,348 (1.4 spg)
- Stats at NBA.com
- Stats at Basketball Reference

Rickey Green (born August 18, 1954) is an American former professional basketball player who played in the National Basketball Association (NBA).

Green, a 6 ft 0 in (1.83 m) and 170 lb (77 kg) point guard, led Chicago's Hirsch High School to the 1973 IHSA Class AA State championship. He then played college basketball for the Vincennes Trailblazers and Michigan Wolverines; at the latter school, his team lost to the undefeated Big Ten Conference rival Indiana Hoosiers in the championship game of the 1976 NCAA tournament. He then led the 1976–77 Wolverines to the Big Ten regular season championship, earning 1977 All-American recognition.

Green was selected with the 16th pick in the 1977 NBA draft, and competed in 14 seasons, playing for the Golden State Warriors, Detroit Pistons, Utah Jazz, Charlotte Hornets, Milwaukee Bucks, Indiana Pacers, Philadelphia 76ers, and Boston Celtics. He was known for his speed, nicknamed "The Fastest of Them All" by announcer Hot Rod Hundley.

In 1988, as a member of the Jazz, Green scored the five millionth point in NBA history, hitting a 3-pointer at the buzzer to end the third quarter in a game against the Cleveland Cavaliers. He autographed the ball after the game and it was taken to the Basketball Hall of Fame.

== Professional career ==
Green spent his rookie year with the Warriors as a backup, and was traded to the Pistons just prior to the 1978–79 season. He played in 27 games for coach Dick Vitale in Detroit before being released in December 1978. Out of the NBA, Green ultimately found himself playing for the Hawaii Volcanos in the Continental Basketball Association. There, he was able to transform his game, from being a shoot-first point guard to more of a distributor and floor general on offense.

He returned to the NBA in 1980, having caught the eye of Jazz coach and general manager Frank Layden. Green played significant minutes at the point guard position in his first year, teaming with high-scoring small forward Adrian Dantley and rookie shooting guard Darrell Griffith. He established himself as undisputed full-time starter in the 1981–82 season, averaging a career-high 14.8 points per game, and ranking among league leaders in assists (7.8) and steals (2.3) per game. He continued his strong scoring the following year, averaging 14.3 points per game, and improved in assists (8.9) and steals (2.8), ranking third and second, respectively, among league leaders in those categories.

The following season (1983–84) was probably Green's best as a professional. He continued his strong play on offense, averaging 13.2 points and a career-high 9.2 assists per game. In addition, he led the NBA in steals per game (2.7) and total steals (215); of note, he had also led the league in total steals the year previous year (with 220). For his efforts, he was named to the 1984 NBA All-Star Game, the only All-Star appearance of his career; Green also made history by becoming the first ever CBA alum to earn NBA All-Star recognition at the time. Even more importantly, after a decade of struggling as a franchise, the Jazz won the Midwest Division title and earned their first-ever appearance in the NBA playoffs, advancing to the conference semifinals before losing to the Phoenix Suns.

Green remained the starting point guard for Utah for most of the next three seasons, leading the team into the playoffs each year, but was increasing challenged for playing time by a young new arrival named John Stockton, whom the Jazz had selected in the 1984 NBA draft. Stockton ultimately overtook Green as starter in 1987, and went on to a Hall of Fame career that totaled 19 seasons in the league, all with the Jazz franchise. Green was chosen by the Charlotte Hornets in the expansion draft in 1988, and ended up playing for five different teams in the last four years of his career, mostly as a backup. He experienced a brief resurgence with the 76ers in 1990–91 after Johnny Dawkins suffered a season-ending injury; Green started 75 games in his place that year, averaging 10.0 points and 5.2 assists per game. He retired in 1992 after a brief stint with the Celtics.

== NBA career statistics ==
Legend
GP	Games played	GS	Games started	MPG	Minutes per game
FG%	Field goal percentage	3P%	3-point field goal percentage	FT%	Free throw percentage
RPG	Rebounds per game	APG	Assists per game	SPG	Steals per game
BPG	Blocks per game	PPG	Points per game	**Bold**	Career high
*	Led the league

=== Regular season ===
Year	Team	GP	GS	MPG	FG%	3P%	FT%	RPG	APG	SPG	BPG	PPG
1977–78	Golden State	76	–	14.4	.381	–	.600	1.5	2.0	0.8	0.0	4.5
1978–79	Detroit	27	–	16.0	.379	–	.672	1.5	2.3	0.9	0.0	6.6
1980–81	Utah	47	–	27.8	.481	.000	.722	2.5	5.0	1.6	0.0	9.0
1981–82	Utah	**81**	73	34.8	.493	.000	.765	**3.0**	7.8	2.3	0.1	**14.8**
1982–83	Utah	78	78	**35.7**	.493	.154	.797	2.9	8.9	**2.8**	0.1	14.3
1983–84	Utah	**81**	**81**	34.2	.486	.118	.821	2.8	**9.2**	2.7*	**0.2**	13.2
1984–85	Utah	77	77	31.6	.477	.300	.869	2.5	7.8	1.7	0.0	13.0
1985–86	Utah	80	44	25.2	.471	.172	.852	1.7	5.1	1.3	0.1	11.7
1986–87	Utah	**81**	80	25.8	.467	**.368**	.827	2.0	6.7	1.4	0.0	9.6
1987–88	Utah	**81**	3	13.8	.424	.211	.904	1.0	3.7	0.7	0.0	4.9
1988–89	Charlotte	33	2	11.2	.432	.200	**.929**	0.7	2.5	0.5	0.0	3.9
1988–89	Milwaukee	30	0	16.7	**.545**	.333	.895	1.5	3.5	0.7	0.1	5.4
1989–90	Indiana	69	0	13.4	.433	.091	.843	0.8	2.6	0.7	0.0	3.5
1990–91	Philadelphia	79	75	28.5	.463	.222	.830	1.7	5.2	0.7	0.1	10.0
1991–92	Boston	26	0	14.1	.447	.250	.722	0.9	2.6	0.7	0.0	4.1
Career		946	513	24.6	.469	.207	.807	1.9	5.5	1.4	0.1	9.4
All-Star		1	0	19.0	.375	–	–	0.0	11.0	1.0	0.0	6.0

=== Playoffs ===
Year	Team	GP	GS	MPG	FG%	3P%	FT%	RPG	APG	SPG	BPG	PPG
1984	Utah	**11**	–	**36.7**	.424	.250	.744	**3.1**	**9.5**	**1.7**	**0.4**	14.6
1985	Utah	10	10	30.2	**.538**	.143	.921	3.0	7.5	1.2	0.0	**15.0**
1986	Utah	4	4	29.8	.488	.500	.909	2.3	**9.5**	0.5	0.0	13.3
1987	Utah	4	3	18.0	.478	.000	.833	2.0	6.3	0.5	0.0	6.8
1988	Utah	7	0	5.4	.250	–	–	0.1	1.3	0.3	0.0	0.6
1989	Milwaukee	8	0	13.8	.414	.500	**1.000**	1.6	2.3	0.6	0.0	3.6
1990	Indiana	3	0	10.3	.143	–	–	0.3	1.0	0.3	0.0	0.7
1991	Philadelphia	8	8	24.9	.436	**.750**	.889	1.1	2.8	0.9	0.0	7.4
Career		55	25	23.2	.455	.350	.847	1.9	5.3	0.9	0.1	8.8

== See also ==
- List of National Basketball Association players with most steals in a game
- University of Michigan Athletic Hall of Honor
