= 1988–89 Boston Celtics season =

NBA basketball team season

- Head coach: Jimmy Rodgers
- President: Red Auerbach
- General manager: Jan Volk
- Owners: Don Gaston; Alan N. Cohen; Paul Dupee
- Arena: Boston Garden; Hartford Civic Center

Results
- Record: 42–40 (.512)
- Place: Division: 3rd (Atlantic); Conference: 8th (Eastern)
- Playoff finish: First round (lost to Pistons 0–3)
- Stats at Basketball Reference

Local media
- Television: WLVI (Gil Santos, Bob Cousy); SportsChannel New England (Mike Gorman, Tom Heinsohn)
- Radio: WEEI (Johnny Most, Glenn Ordway)

The 1988–89 Boston Celtics season was the 43rd season for the Boston Celtics in the National Basketball Association.

== Season summary ==
=== Off-season ===
After the resignation of K.C. Jones, the Celtics hired assistant coach Jimmy Rodgers as their new head coach. The team had the 24th overall pick in the 1988 NBA draft, and selected shooting guard Brian Shaw from the University of California, Santa Barbara.

=== Regular season ===
This season was severely hindered by the loss of All-Star forward Larry Bird to a heel injury, which required surgery to have bone spurs removed from both heels; Bird only played just six early-regular season games for the Celtics before being lost to injury, averaging 19.3 points, 6.2 rebounds and 4.8 assists per game, without any three-point field-goal attempts. Initially, Bird was expected to be back in March, but it was delayed and ultimately became a season-ending injury.

Under Rodgers and without Bird, along with the addition of Shaw, the Celtics struggled and played around .500 in winning percentage, holding a 23–23 record at the All-Star break. At mid-season, the team traded Danny Ainge, and second-year forward Brad Lohaus to the Sacramento Kings in exchange for Ed Pinckney, and Joe Kleine. Before the trade, Ainge averaged 15.9 points and 4.8 assists per game in 45 games, while Lohaus provided with 5.6 points and 3.0 rebounds per game in 48 games. The results were dramatic as the Celtics finished in third place in the Atlantic Division with a mediocre 42–40 record, and earned the eighth seed in the Eastern Conference, clinching an NBA playoff spot in the final game of the regular season. Before this season, the Celtics averaged over 60 wins per season thus far in the 1980s, and had been the Eastern Conference's first seed for five consecutive seasons.

Kevin McHale averaged 22.5 points and 8.2 rebounds per game, and was named to the NBA All-Defensive Second Team, while Robert Parish averaged 18.6 points, 12.5 rebounds and 1.5 blocks per game, and was named to the All-NBA Third Team, and second-year guard Reggie Lewis showed improvement becoming the Celtics' starting small forward in Bird's absence, as he provided the team with 18.5 points and 1.5 steals per game. In addition, Pinckney provided with 10.1 points and 5.1 rebounds per game in 29 games after the trade, while Dennis Johnson contributed 10.0 points, 6.6 assists and 1.3 steals per game, and Shaw averaged 8.6 points and 5.8 assists per game, and was named to the NBA All-Rookie Second Team. Meanwhile, Jim Paxson contributed 8.6 points per game, and Kleine averaged 6.1 points and 4.9 rebounds per game in 28 games.

During the NBA All-Star weekend at the Houston Astrodome in Houston, Texas, McHale was selected for the 1989 NBA All-Star Game, as a member of the Eastern Conference All-Star team, while before the mid-season trade, Ainge participated in the NBA Three-Point Shootout. Parish finished tied in eleventh place in Most Valuable Player voting, while Lewis finished in second place in Most Improved Player voting, behind Kevin Johnson of the Phoenix Suns. The Celtics posted a successful 32–9 home record at the Boston Garden, but struggled on the road, failing to record a road win over a team above .500 in winning percentage.

The Celtics finished 13th in the NBA in home-game attendance, with an attendance of 611,537 at the Boston Garden during the regular season.

=== NBA playoffs ===
In the Eastern Conference First Round of the 1989 NBA playoffs, and for the third consecutive year, and the fourth time in five seasons, the Celtics faced off against the top–seeded, and Central Division champion Detroit Pistons, who were led by the trio of All-Star guard Isiah Thomas, Joe Dumars and Bill Laimbeer. The Pistons were heavily favored, but hope arose for a competitive series when the Celtics activated Bird for their playoff roster; however, Bird never suited up for a game, as the Celtics lost the first two games to the Pistons on the road at The Palace of Auburn Hills, before losing Game 3 at home, 100–85 at the Boston Garden, thus losing the series in a three-game sweep. This was the first time since 1956 that the Celtics lost their opening round playoff series; the Celtics had won their previous 28 opening round playoff series dating back to 1957.

The Pistons would advance to the NBA Finals for the second consecutive year, and defeat the 2-time defending NBA champion Los Angeles Lakers in a four-game sweep in the 1989 NBA Finals, winning their first ever NBA championship.

== Draft picks ==
Round	Pick	Player	Position	Nationality	College
1	24	Brian Shaw	SG	United States	UCSB
3	74	Gerald Paddio	SF/SG	United States	UNLV

== Roster ==
1988–89 Boston Celtics roster
Players

Pos.	No.	Player	Height	Weight	DOB	From
C	42	Mark Acres	6 ft 11 in (2.11 m)	220 lb (100 kg)	1962–11–15	Oral Roberts
F	33	Larry Bird	6 ft 9 in (2.06 m)	220 lb (100 kg)	1956–12–07	Indiana State
G	12	Otis Birdsong	6 ft 3 in (1.91 m)	190 lb (86 kg)	1955–12–09	Houston
G/F	34	Kevin Gamble	6 ft 5 in (1.96 m)	210 lb (95 kg)	1965–11–13	Iowa
PF	31	Ron Grandison	6 ft 6 in (1.98 m)	215 lb (98 kg)	1964–07–06	LSU New Orleans
G	3	Dennis Johnson	6 ft 4 in (1.93 m)	185 lb (84 kg)	1954–09–08	Pepperdine
C	53	Joe Kleine	6 ft 11 in (2.11 m)	255 lb (116 kg)	1962–01–04	Arkansas
G/F	35	Reggie Lewis	6 ft 7 in (2.01 m)	195 lb (88 kg)	1965–11–21	Northeastern
F	32	Kevin McHale	6 ft 10 in (2.08 m)	210 lb (95 kg)	1957–12–19	Minnesota
C	00	Robert Parish	7 ft 0 in (2.13 m)	230 lb (104 kg)	1953–09–30	Centenary
G	4	Jim Paxson	6 ft 6 in (1.98 m)	200 lb (91 kg)	1957–07–09	Dayton
F	54	Ed Pinckney	6 ft 9 in (2.06 m)	195 lb (88 kg)	1963–03–27	Villanova
C	45	Ramón Rivas	6 ft 10 in (2.08 m)	260 lb (118 kg)	1966–06–03	Temple
G	20	Brian Shaw	6 ft 6 in (1.98 m)	190 lb (86 kg)	1966–03–22	UC Santa Barbara
G	7	Kelvin Upshaw	6 ft 2 in (1.88 m)	180 lb (82 kg)	1963–01–12	Utah

Coaches
Head coach
- Jimmy Rodgers
Assistant(s)
- Chris Ford
- Lanny Van Eman

Legend
- (DP) Unsigned draft pick
- (FA) Free agent
- (S) Suspended
- Injured

=== Roster Notes ===
- Small forward Larry Bird played 6 games but missed the majority of the season after undergoing surgery to remove bone spurs from both of his heels.

== Regular season ==
=== Season standings ===
Atlantic Division	W	L	PCT	GB	Home	Road	Div
y-New York Knicks	52	30	.634	–	35–6	17–24	18–12
x-Philadelphia 76ers	46	36	.561	6	30–11	16–25	19–11
x-Boston Celtics	42	40	.512	10	32–9	10–31	19–11
Washington Bullets	40	42	.488	12	30–11	10–31	17–13
New Jersey Nets	26	56	.317	26	17–24	9–32	9–21
Charlotte Hornets	20	62	.244	32	12–29	8–33	8–22

#	Eastern Conference				
#	Team	W	L	PCT	GB
1	z-Detroit Pistons	63	19	.768	–
2	y-New York Knicks	52	30	.634	11
3	x-Cleveland Cavaliers	57	25	.695	6
4	x-Atlanta Hawks	52	30	.634	11
5	x-Milwaukee Bucks	49	33	.598	14
6	x-Chicago Bulls	47	35	.573	16
7	x-Philadelphia 76ers	46	36	.561	17
8	x-Boston Celtics	42	40	.512	21
9	Washington Bullets	40	42	.488	23
10	Indiana Pacers	28	54	.341	35
11	New Jersey Nets	26	56	.317	37
12	Charlotte Hornets	20	62	.244	43

== Game log ==
=== Regular season ===
1988–89 game log
Total: 42–40 (home: 32–9; Away: 10–31)
November: 8–7 (home: 6–3; road: 2–4)

Game	Date	Team	Score	High points	High rebounds	High assists	Location Attendance	Record

December: 5–7 (home: 4–2; road: 1–5)

Game	Date	Team	Score	High points	High rebounds	High assists	Location Attendance	Record

January: 7–8 (home: 6–2; road: 1–6)

Game	Date	Team	Score	High points	High rebounds	High assists	Location Attendance	Record

February: 6–7 (home: 3–1; road: 3–6)

Game	Date	Team	Score	High points	High rebounds	High assists	Location Attendance	Record

March: 11–4 (home: 10–0; road: 1–4)

Game	Date	Team	Score	High points	High rebounds	High assists	Location Attendance	Record

April: 5–7 (home: 3–1; road: 2–6)

Game	Date	Team	Score	High points	High rebounds	High assists	Location Attendance	Record

1988–89 schedule

=== Playoffs ===
1989 playoff game log
First round: 0–3 (home: 0–1; road: 0–2)

Game	Date	Team	Score	High points	High rebounds	High assists	Location Attendance	Series
1	April 28	@ Detroit	L 91–101	Kevin McHale (27)	Robert Parish (12)	Brian Shaw (8)	The Palace of Auburn Hills; 21,454	0–1
2	April 30	@ Detroit	L 95–102	Reggie Lewis (21)	Kevin McHale (11)	Lewis, Johnson (5)	The Palace of Auburn Hills; 21,454	0–2
3	May 2	Detroit	L 85–100	Reggie Lewis (20)	Joe Kleine (11)	Brian Shaw (7)	Boston Garden; 14,890	0–3

1989 schedule

== Player statistics ==
Legend
GP	Games played	GS	Games started	MPG	Minutes per game
FG%	Field-goal percentage	3P%	3-point field-goal percentage	FT%	Free-throw percentage
RPG	Rebounds per game	APG	Assists per game	SPG	Steals per game
BPG	Blocks per game	PPG	Points per game

== Awards and records ==
- The Celtics would win the 1988 McDonald's Open after winning games against the Yugoslavia national basketball team and Spain's Real Madrid Baloncesto.

=== Season ===
- Robert Parish was named to the All-NBA Third Team
- Kevin McHale was named to the NBA All-Defensive Second Team
- Brian Shaw was named to the NBA All-Rookie Team 2nd Team

== Transactions ==
February 23, 1989: Danny Ainge was traded with Brad Lohaus to Sacramento Kings for Joe Kleine & Ed Pinckney.

== See also ==
- 1988–89 NBA season
