= 1989 NBA All-Star Game =

Exhibition basketball game

	1	2	3	4	Total
East	31	28	37	38	134
West	47	40	24	32	143
- Date: February 12, 1989
- Arena: Astrodome; The Summit (All-Star Saturday)
- City: Houston
- MVP: Karl Malone (West)
- National anthem: Natalie Cole
- Attendance: 44,735
- Network: CBS (All-Star Game); TBS (All-Star Saturday)
- Announcers: Dick Stockton and Hubie Brown; Bob Neal and Rick Barry (All-Star Saturday)

NBA All-Star Game
< 1988	1990 >

The 39th National Basketball Association All-Star Game was an exhibition basketball game which was played on February 12, 1989, at Astrodome, Houston, the previous home of the Houston Rockets. This was the first NBA All-Star Game to be held in Houston and the second hosted by the Rockets franchise, after doing so in 1971 as the San Diego Rockets. The Western All-Stars won the game, 143–134. Karl Malone was named the NBA All-Star Game Most Valuable Player (MVP) after scoring a game-high 28 points (tied with Michael Jordan) for the West. All-Star Saturday events, including the Slam Dunk Contest and the Three-Point Contest, were held at the The Summit, the home of the Rockets, on February 11.

The game set a new NBA All-Star attendance record of 44,735, which was held until 2010. Neither Magic Johnson nor Larry Bird played, though both were still active in the NBA. Johnson was selected but sat out due to injuries and was replaced by Kareem Abdul-Jabbar, who made his 19th and final All-Star appearance, which was an NBA record at the time. Though he only scored 4 points, the game ended with Abdul-Jabbar hitting the final shot of the game, a sky hook.

The game featured a rap-by-rap group Ultramagnetic MCs that named each all-star and each coach. The rap was broadcast immediately before the start of the game.

== Coaches ==
The coaches were Lenny Wilkens of the Cleveland Cavaliers for the East and Pat Riley of the Los Angeles Lakers for the West. Both the Cavaliers and Lakers led their respective conferences entering the game.

== Rosters ==
The East was composed of Mark Jackson, Kevin McHale, Michael Jordan, Patrick Ewing, Moses Malone, Charles Barkley, Isiah Thomas, Dominique Wilkins, Mark Price, Terry Cummings, Larry Nance and Brad Daugherty.

The west was led by the Utah Jazz trio of Karl Malone, John Stockton and Mark Eaton; the Lakers' James Worthy, Kareem Abdul-Jabbar, Clyde Drexler, Alex English, Chris Mullin, Akeem Olajuwon, Tom Chambers, Dale Ellis and Kevin Duckworth.

Eastern Conference All-Stars
Pos.	Player	Team	Appearance
Starters
G	Isiah Thomas	Detroit Pistons	8th
G	Michael Jordan	Chicago Bulls	5th
F	Dominique Wilkins	Atlanta Hawks	4th
F	Charles Barkley	Philadelphia 76ers	3rd
C	Moses Malone	Atlanta Hawks	12th
Reserves
G	Mark Price	Cleveland Cavaliers	1st
F	Terry Cummings	Milwaukee Bucks	2nd
F	Larry Nance	Cleveland Cavaliers	2nd
C	Patrick Ewing	New York Knicks	3rd
F	Kevin McHale	Boston Celtics	5th
G	Mark Jackson	New York Knicks	1st
C	Brad Daugherty	Cleveland Cavaliers	2nd
Head coach: Lenny Wilkens (Cleveland Cavaliers)

Western Conference All-Stars
Pos.	Player	Team	Appearance
Starters
G	Magic Johnson^{DNP}	Los Angeles Lakers	9th
G	Dale Ellis	Seattle SuperSonics	1st
F	Alex English	Denver Nuggets	8th
F	Karl Malone	Utah Jazz	2nd
C	Akeem Olajuwon	Houston Rockets	5th
Reserves
G	Clyde Drexler	Portland Trail Blazers	3rd
F	James Worthy	Los Angeles Lakers	4th
F	Tom Chambers	Phoenix Suns	2nd
F	Chris Mullin	Golden State Warriors	1st
C	Kareem Abdul-Jabbar	Los Angeles Lakers	19th
C	Mark Eaton	Utah Jazz	1st
C	Kevin Duckworth	Portland Trail Blazers	1st
G	John Stockton^{ST}	Utah Jazz	1st
Head coach: Pat Riley (Los Angeles Lakers)

- ^DNPMagic Johnson was unable to play due to injury. Kareem Abdul-Jabbar was selected as his replacement.
- ^ST John Stockton to start in place of the injured Johnson.

== Score by periods ==
Score by periods:	1	2	3	4	Final
East	31	28	37	38	134
West	47	40	24	32	143

- Halftime— West, 87–59
- Third Quarter— West, 111–96
- Officials: Hugh Evans, Dick Bavetta, and Bill Saar
- Attendance: 44,735 (NBA All-Star Record)

== NBA All-Star Legends Classic ==
- This 6th straight edition featuring the East from the likes of Bobby Jones, Spencer Haywood, Paul Westphal, Dave Cowens, Tiny Archibald, Oscar Robertson, Jamaal Wilkes, Zelmo Beaty, Hot Rod Hundley, and Tom McMillen.
- The West featured the likes of Calvin Murphy, Mike Newlin, Don Chaney, Earl Monroe, Lucious Jackson, Clifford Ray, Rick Barry, Elvin Hayes, Rudy Tomjanovich, and Dan Issel.
