= Phil Zevenbergen =

American basketball player (born 1964)

Personal information
- Born: April 13, 1964 (age 62) Seattle, Washington, U.S.
- Listed height: 6 ft 10 in (2.08 m)
- Listed weight: 230 lb (104 kg)

Career information
- High school: Woodway (Edmonds, Washington)
- College: Seattle Pacific (1982–1983); Edmonds CC (1984–1985); Washington (1985–1987)
- NBA draft: 1987: 3rd round, 50th overall pick
- Drafted by: San Antonio Spurs
- Playing career: 1987–1999
- Position: Center / power forward
- Number: 41

Career history
- 1987: Spondilatte Cremona
- 1987–1988: Caja Ronda
- 1988: San Antonio Spurs
- 1988–1989: Viola Reggio Calabria
- 1991–1992: Levallois
- 1993: Hyundai Desio
- 1995–1996: RCM Toulouse
- 1996–1997: Rabotnički
- 1998–1999: Unia Tarnów

Career highlights
- First-team All-Pac-10 (1987)
- Stats at NBA.com
- Stats at Basketball Reference

Phil Zevenbergen (born April 13, 1964) is a retired American professional basketball player.

A 6-foot-10-inch (2.08 m) power forward born in Seattle, Washington, Zevenbergen played collegiately at Seattle Pacific University, Edmonds Community College and the University of Washington. He was selected in the third round (50th overall) of the 1987 NBA draft by the San Antonio Spurs, and played eight games for them in 1987–88, averaging 3.8 points and 1.6 rebounds per game.

He has also played professionally in Italy, Spain, France, Macedonia and Poland.

== Career statistics ==
Legend
GP	Games played	GS	Games started	MPG	Minutes per game
FG%	Field goal percentage	3P%	3-point field goal percentage	FT%	Free throw percentage
RPG	Rebounds per game	APG	Assists per game	SPG	Steals per game
BPG	Blocks per game	PPG	Points per game	**Bold**	Career high

=== NBA ===
==== Regular season ====
Year	Team	GP	GS	MPG	FG%	3P%	FT%	RPG	APG	SPG	BPG	PPG
1987–88	San Antonio	8	0	7.3	.556	–	.000	1.6	.4	.4	.1	3.8

==== Playoffs ====
Year	Team	GP	GS	MPG	FG%	3P%	FT%	RPG	APG	SPG	BPG	PPG
1988	San Antonio	1	0	1.0	.000	–	–	.0	.0	.0	.0	.0
