= Jon Sundvold =

American basketball player (born 1961)

Personal information
- Born: July 2, 1961 (age 65) Sioux Falls, South Dakota, U.S.
- Listed height: 6 ft 2 in (1.88 m)
- Listed weight: 170 lb (77 kg)

Career information
- High school: Blue Springs (Blue Springs, Missouri)
- College: Missouri (1979–1983)
- NBA draft: 1983: 1st round, 16th overall pick
- Drafted by: Seattle SuperSonics
- Playing career: 1983–1991
- Position: Shooting guard
- Number: 20

Career history
- 1983–1985: Seattle SuperSonics
- 1985–1988: San Antonio Spurs
- 1988–1992: Miami Heat

Career highlights
- Consensus second-team All-American (1983); No. 20 retired by Missouri Tigers
- Stats at NBA.com
- Stats at Basketball Reference
Medals
Representing United States
World Championships
Silver medal – second place	1982 Colombia	National team

Jon Thomas "Sunny" Sundvold (born July 2, 1961) is an American former professional basketball player who was selected by the Seattle SuperSonics in the first round (16th pick overall) of the 1983 NBA draft. A 6'2" shooting guard from the University of Missouri, Sundvold played in 9 NBA seasons from 1983–1992. He played for the Sonics, San Antonio Spurs and Miami Heat.

== Early life ==
Though born in South Dakota, Sundvold grew up in Blue Springs, Missouri, in suburban Kansas City, where his father Robert was a successful home builder. While a player at Blue Springs High School, Sundvold scored over 2,100 points and was twice selected to the All-State team. He earned a basketball scholarship to Mizzou where he played all four years for Norm Stewart's Tigers. As a senior, he averaged nearly 20 points per game and made 87-percent of his free-throw attempts. Sundvold is one of only two Missouri players to play on four consecutive Big 8 Conference championship teams and was an All-American in 1983. Sundvold also played for the US national team in the 1982 FIBA World Championship, winning the silver medal. Sundvold's older brother Bob is a college basketball coach.

== NBA career ==
Drafted by Seattle in the 1983 draft, Jon Sundvold made an immediate impact by helping the SuperSonics earn an NBA Playoff berth in his first season. Sundvold's best year as a professional came during the 1986–87 season as a member of the Spurs, appearing in 76 games and averaging 11.2 ppg. Selected by the Miami Heat in the 1988 NBA Expansion Draft, Sundvold played more of a bench role but still led the NBA in three point shooting percentage in 1989, hitting more than 50-percent of his attempts. He also participated in the NBA All Star Three Point Contest in 1989 and 1990. A neck injury forced a premature end to his playing career in 1992. In his NBA career, Sundvold appeared in 502 games and scored a total of 3,886 points.

== Post-playing days ==
After his nine-year NBA career came to a close Sundvold returned to Columbia, Missouri and put his degree in finance from MU to use. He first worked full-time for BC Christopher Securities, where he'd already been working part-time during the basketball off-season. In 1997 Sundvold stepped out on his own, establishing the investment firm, Sundvold Capital Management. Despite no longer being active on the court, Sundvold has stayed close to the game he loves as a former college basketball analyst for ESPN and CBS and is currently heard as a color analyst on MU Tiger games broadcast by the Missouri Sports Network. Sundvold and wife Tamara are the parents of one son and two daughters and reside in the Columbia, Missouri area. His son Wilson also attended MU and played on the golf team before joining Jon's firm. His daughter Caroline is a Mizzou alum and former Dallas Cowboys Cheerleader. His other daughter Anna Kate is also a Dallas Cowboys Cheerleader. On June 8, 2016, Sundvold was named to the MU Board of Curators by Governor Jay Nixon.

== Career statistics ==
Legend
GP	Games played	GS	Games started	MPG	Minutes per game
FG%	Field goal percentage	3P%	3-point field goal percentage	FT%	Free throw percentage
RPG	Rebounds per game	APG	Assists per game	SPG	Steals per game
BPG	Blocks per game	PPG	Points per game	**Bold**	Career high
*	Led the league

=== NBA ===
==== Regular season ====
Year	Team	GP	GS	MPG	FG%	3P%	FT%	RPG	APG	SPG	BPG	PPG
1983–84	Seattle	73	2	17.6	.445	.243	.889	1.2	3.3	.4	.0	6.9
1984–85	Seattle	73	1	15.8	.425	.316	.814	1.0	2.8	**.5**	.0	5.5
1985–86	San Antonio	70	4	16.4	.462	.350	.813	1.1	3.7	**.5**	.0	7.1
1986–87	San Antonio	**76**	**42**	**23.2**	**.486**	.336	.833	**1.3**	**4.1**	**.5**	.0	**11.2**
1987–88	San Antonio	52	12	19.7	.464	.406	.896	.9	3.0	**.5**	.0	8.1
1988–89	Miami	68	8	19.7	.455	.522*	.825	**1.3**	2.0	.4	.0	10.4
1989–90	Miami	63	2	13.8	.408	.440	.846	1.1	1.6	.4	.0	6.1
1990–91	Miami	24	0	9.4	.402	.429	**1.000**	.4	1.0	.3	.0	4.7
1991–92	Miami	3	0	2.7	.333	**1.000**	–	.0	.7	.0	.0	1.0
Career		502	71	17.6	.452	.392	.849	1.1	2.9	.4	.0	7.7

==== Playoffs ====
Year	Team	GP	GS	MPG	FG%	3P%	FT%	RPG	APG	SPG	BPG	PPG
1984	Seattle	**3**		7.3	.375	.000	**1.000**	.7	1.7	.0	.0	2.7
1986	San Antonio	**3**	0	14.3	.389	.167	**1.000**	.3	1.7	.0	.0	5.3
1988	San Antonio	**3**	**3**	**30.0**	**.500**	**.333**	.667	**1.3**	**5.0**	**1.3**	.0	**11.7**
1992	Miami	1	0	2.0	.000	–	–	.0	.0	.0	.0	.0
Career		10	3	15.7	.439	.222	.833	.7	2.5	.4	.0	5.9

== Honors ==
- University of Missouri Athletics Hall of Fame inductee, 1990.
- University of Missouri Basketball All-Century team member.
- Member, National Federation of State High School Associations Hall of Fame.
