= Ricky Wilson (basketball) =

American basketball player (born 1964)

Personal information
- Born: July 16, 1964 (age 62) Hampton, Virginia, U.S.
- Listed height: 6 ft 3 in (1.91 m)
- Listed weight: 195 lb (88 kg)

Career information
- High school: Phoebus (Hampton, Virginia)
- College: George Mason (1982–1986)
- NBA draft: 1986: 3rd round, 52nd overall pick
- Drafted by: Chicago Bulls
- Playing career: 1986–1994
- Position: Point guard
- Number: 15

Career history
- 1986–1988: Mississippi Jets
- 1988: New Jersey Nets
- 1988: San Antonio Spurs
- 1988: Miami Tropics
- 1988–1989: Bayer Giants Leverkusen
- 1989–1990: Grand Rapids Hoops
- 1990: San Miguel Beermen
- 1990–1991: Quad City Thunder
- 1991: San Miguel Beermen
- 1992: Winnipeg Thunder
- 1992–1993: Capital Region Pontiacs
- 1993: Rockford Lightning
- 1993–1994: Wichita Falls Texans

Career highlights
- CBA All-Star (1988); All-CBA First Team (1988); CBA All-Defensive Team (1988)
- Stats at NBA.com
- Stats at Basketball Reference

Ricky Wilson (born July 16, 1964) is an American former professional basketball player born in Hampton, Virginia.

A 6'3" point guard from George Mason University, Wilson was selected by the Chicago Bulls in the third round of the 1986 NBA draft. He played one season (1987–88) in the NBA as a member of the New Jersey Nets and San Antonio Spurs, averaging 5.2 points per game and 2.9 assists per game.

Wilson played in the Continental Basketball Association (CBA) for the Mississippi Jets, Grand Rapids Hoops, Quad City Thunder, Capital Region Pontiacs, Rockford Lightning and Wichita Falls Texans from 1986 to 1994. He was selected to the All-CBA First Team and All-Defensive Team in 1988. Wilson also played in the 1988 CBA All-Star Game.

On May 19, 1992 The Winnipeg Thunder of the World Basketball League signed Wilson to a contract and Activated him to the roster.

== Career statistics ==
Legend
GP	Games played	GS	Games started	MPG	Minutes per game
FG%	Field goal percentage	3P%	3-point field goal percentage	FT%	Free throw percentage
RPG	Rebounds per game	APG	Assists per game	SPG	Steals per game
BPG	Blocks per game	PPG	Points per game	**Bold**	Career high

=== NBA ===
==== Regular season ====
Year	Team	GP	GS	MPG	FG%	3P%	FT%	RPG	APG	SPG	BPG	PPG
1987–88	New Jersey	6	0	7.8	**.636**	**1.000**	.545	.2	1.0	**1.0**	.0	3.5
1987–88	San Antonio	**18**	**1**	**20.7**	.364	.360	**.793**	**1.4**	**3.5**	.9	**.2**	**5.8**
Career		24	1	17.5	.391	.385	.725	1.1	2.9	1.0	.1	5.2

==== Playoffs ====
Year	Team	GP	GS	MPG	FG%	3P%	FT%	RPG	APG	SPG	BPG	PPG
1988	San Antonio	2	0	4.5	.000	–	–	.0	.5	.0	.0	.0
