= Kurt Nimphius =

American basketball player (born 1958)

Personal information
- Born: March 13, 1958 (age 68) Milwaukee, Wisconsin, U.S.
- Listed height: 6 ft 10 in (2.08 m)
- Listed weight: 218 lb (99 kg)

Career information
- High school: South Milwaukee (South Milwaukee, Wisconsin)
- College: Arizona State (1976–1980)
- NBA draft: 1980: 3rd round, 47th overall pick
- Drafted by: Denver Nuggets
- Playing career: 1980–1991
- Position: Center / power forward
- Number: 40, 41

Career history
- 1980–1981: Rodrigo Chieti
- 1980–1981: Alberta Dusters
- 1981–1985: Dallas Mavericks
- 1985–1987: Los Angeles Clippers
- 1987: Detroit Pistons
- 1987–1988: San Antonio Spurs
- 1988–1989: Canarias
- 1989–1990: Philadelphia 76ers
- 1990–1991: Il Messaggero Roma

Career highlights
- First-team All-Pac-10 (1980)

Career NBA statistics
- Points: 3,602 (6.4 ppg)
- Rebounds: 2,474 (4.4 rpg)
- Blocks: 696 (1.2 bpg)
- Stats at NBA.com
- Stats at Basketball Reference

Kurt Nimphius (born March 13, 1958) is an American former basketball player who played nine seasons in the National Basketball Association (NBA). He played college basketball for the Arizona State Sun Devils.

== Early life ==
Born in Milwaukee, Wisconsin, Nimphius was the son of Karl and Esther Nimphius and was raised with siblings Kris and Karla. His father and uncles operated the Nimphius Boat Company and his father was a woodworking teacher, who built the family home himself.

== High school career ==
Nimphius attended South Milwaukee High School in South Milwaukee, graduating in 1976 and playing basketball for Coach Jerry Sullivan.

In the 1976 Wisconsin Class A Basketball Tournament, Nimphius led South Milwaukee to three victories and the state championship to complete a 25–0 season. Nimphius scored 97 points, the second-highest total ever in the tournament, along with 40 rebounds.

Nimphius led South Milwaukee to victories over Milwaukee Washington, Madison West and Eau Claire Memorial. Nimphius scored 30 points with 11 rebounds in the 45–43 Finals victory over Coach Dick Bennett's Eau Claire Memorial team. Nimphius hit a short jumper with 46 seconds left to break a 43–43 tie.

== College career ==
Nimphius attended Arizona State University, where he played for coach Ned Wulk. As a freshman in 1976–77 he averaged 1.5 points and 1.6 rebounds for the Sun Devils. As a sophomore, Nimphius averaged 8.5 points and 6.1 rebounds, shooting 55.7%, from the floor. As a junior, in 1978–79, Nimphius averaged 9.0 points, 5.0 rebounds, shooting 58%.

As a senior in 1979–80 under Coach Wulk, Nimphius averaged 16.6 points, 9.6 rebounds and 1.2 assists, shooting 60% from the field. Arizona State finished 22–7 and 15–3 in the Pac-10 Conference. He led the team in scoring and rebounding, playing alongside Byron Scott, Sam Williams, Alton Lister and Fat Lever.

Arizona State played in the 1980 NCAA Division I Basketball Tournament. They defeated Loyola Marymount 99–71 before losing to Ohio State 89–75. Nimphius had 13 points and 7 rebounds against Loyola Marymount and 14 points and 11 rebounds against Ohio State with Herb Williams, Kelvin Ransey and Clark Kellogg.

Nimphius was named All-Pac-10 after his senior season, when he had 11 double-doubles and scored 30 points four times, including 37 points against Oregon.

Overall, Nimphius played in 104 games at ASU, averaging 9.7 points and 6.0 rebounds on 58% shooting. Nimphius holds ASU records for highest single-season (60.9) and career (58.6) field goal percentage marks and ranks among the Sun Devils' top 10 in career rebounding, blocked shots and points (1,006).

== Professional career ==
=== Denver / Europe / Alberta (1980–1981) ===
Drafted by the Denver Nuggets in the third round (1st pick) of the 1980 NBA draft, Nimphius took part in Denver's rookie/free agent camp, but was not invited to return for regular training camp.

Nimphius began the 1980–81 season playing in Europe for Rodrigo Chieti of the Italian Professional League, averaging 18.7 points and 10.5 rebounds in ten games. Nimphius then returned to the United States to play with the Alberta Dusters of the Continental Basketball Association, playing in 18 games, averaging 13.1 points and 8.7 rebounds.

=== Dallas Mavericks (1981–1985) ===
On September 2, 1981, Nimphius was waived by the Denver Nuggets and immediately signed as a free agent by the Dallas Mavericks the same day.

As an NBA rookie in 1981–82, under coach Dick Motta in Dallas, Nimphius played in 63 games with 27 starts, as the Mavericks finished 28–54. Mark Aguirre, the number one overall pick in the 1981 NBA draft, Jay Vincent and Rolando Blackman were fellow rookies.

In 1982–83, Dallas finished 38–44, with Nimphius averaging 18 minutes 5.3 points and 5.0 rebounds, shooting 49% in 81 games. He split time at center with Pat Cummings.

Dallas improved to 43–39 in 1983–84. Nimphius split time with Cummings and averaged 7.9 points, 6.3 rebounds, 2.1 assists and 1.8 blocks in 27 minutes per game. He played in 81 games, starting 47. Dallas made the playoffs, where they defeated the Seattle SuperSonics 3 games to 2, before losing to the Los Angeles Lakers 4–1. Nimphius averaged 3 points and 6 rebounds in the Seattle series and 5.4 points, 4.4 rebounds and 1.4 assists in the Lakers series.

In 1984–85, Nimphius played in all 82 games for Dallas, starting 40, as the Mavericks finished 44–38. Nimphius averaged 6.1 points, 5.0 assists, 2.2 assists and 1.5 blocks in 24 minutes. Dallas was defeated by Portland in the playoffs 3–1 and Nimphius played sparingly in the series.

On November 15, 1984, Hakeem Olajuwon and Nimphius were ejected after a fight in the Mavericks' game against the Houston Rockets.

Nimphius averaged 7.0 points, 4.6 rebounds in 13 games with Dallas in 1985, when he was traded to the Clippers.

=== Los Angeles Clippers (1985–1987) ===
On November 25, 1985, Nimphius was traded by the Dallas Mavericks to the Los Angeles Clippers for James Donaldson.

Nimphius became a starter for the Clippers under Coach Don Chaney. He averaged 12.0 points and 5.9 rebounds in 67 games as the Clippers finished 32–50.

In 1986–87 Nimphius played 38 games for the Clippers, averaging 7.8 points and 3.5 rebounds before he was traded to Detroit for two high draft picks.

=== Detroit Pistons (1987) ===
On January 29, 1987, Nimphius was traded by the Los Angeles Clippers to the Detroit Pistons for a 1987 first round draft pick (Ken Norman was later selected) and a 1987 second round draft pick (Norris Coleman was later selected).

Nimphius played 11 games with the La Crosse Catbirds of the CBA in 1987, while in transition. He averaged 12.1 points, 6.8 rebounds and 2.1 assists.

Playing 28 games for the Pistons and Coach Chuck Daly, Nimphius was used little, averaging 3.4 points and 1.9 rebounds. The Pistons, with Isiah Thomas, John Salley, Bill Laimbeer, Adrian Dantley, Joe Dumars, Dennis Rodman, Rick Mahorn and Vinnie Johnson advanced to the Eastern Conference Finals. The Pistons were defeated 4 games to 3 in the Eastern Conference Finals by the Boston Celtics with Larry Bird, Kevin McHale, Robert Parish and Dennis Johnson.

=== San Antonio Spurs (1987–1988) ===
On October 27, 1987, Nimphius signed as a veteran free agent with the San Antonio Spurs. The Pistons received a 1988 second round draft pick (Jeff Moe was later selected) as compensation.

Nimphius played 72 games for San Antonio as a reserve, averaging 4.4 points and 2.1 rebounds in 12 minutes.

Nimphius then played for the team Cajacanarias of the Canary Islands in the Spanish league in 1988–89.

=== Philadelphia 76ers (1989–1990) ===
On October 23, 1989, Nimphius signed as an unrestricted free agent with the Philadelphia 76ers. In 38 games with the 76ers, he averaged 2.4 points and 1.6 rebounds.

In 1990–91, Nimphius ended his career overseas, playing for Il Messaggero Roma

In his NBA career, Nimphius played for the Dallas Mavericks (1981–1986), Los Angeles Clippers (1985–1987), Detroit Pistons (1986–1987), San Antonio Spurs (1987–1988) and Philadelphia 76ers (1989–1990) in an NBA career that lasted eight seasons. Nimphius averaged 6.4 points, 4.4 rebounds and shot 48% in his 564-game NBA career.

== Personal ==
Nimphius is married to Krista, and lives in Arizona.

Nimphius is a black belt in karate.

== Career statistics ==
Legend
GP	Games played	GS	Games started	MPG	Minutes per game
FG%	Field goal percentage	3P%	3-point field goal percentage	FT%	Free throw percentage
RPG	Rebounds per game	APG	Assists per game	SPG	Steals per game
BPG	Blocks per game	PPG	Points per game	**Bold**	Career high
*	Led the league

=== NBA ===
==== Regular season ====
Year	Team	GP	GS	MPG	FG%	3P%	FT%	RPG	APG	SPG	BPG	PPG
1981–82	Dallas	63	27	17.2	.461	–	.583	4.7	1.0	.3	1.3	5.3
1982–83	Dallas	81	12	18.7	.490	**1.000**	.550	5.0	1.4	.4	1.4	5.3
1983–84	Dallas	**82***	46	27.9	**.520**	.250	.623	**6.3**	2.1	**.5**	**1.8**	7.9
1984–85	Dallas	**82***	40	24.5	.452	.000	**.771**	5.0	**2.2**	.4	1.5	6.1
1985–86	Dallas	13	4	21.5	.514	.000	.586	4.6	1.1	.2	.9	7.0
1985–86	L.A. Clippers	67	**62**	**29.0**	.505	.000	.760	5.9	.7	.4	1.4	**12.0**
1986–87	L.A. Clippers	38	6	21.3	.472	.000	.648	3.5	.5	.4	1.1	7.8
1986–87	Detroit	28	5	9.9	.462	.000	.750	1.9	.3	.1	.5	3.4
1987–88	San Antonio	72	7	12.8	.498	.000	.723	2.1	.7	.3	.8	4.4
1989–90	Philadelphia	38	1	8.3	.418	.000	.467	1.6	.2	.1	.5	2.4
Career		564	210	20.3	.487	.100	.668	4.4	1.2	.4	1.2	6.4

==== Playoffs ====
Year	Team	GP	GS	MPG	FG%	3P%	FT%	RPG	APG	SPG	BPG	PPG
1984	Dallas	**10**		**17.8**	.424	–	.824	**5.3**	**1.3**	.0	**1.4**	**4.2**
1985	Dallas	4	0	12.5	**.500**	–	–	1.5	.8	**.3**	.3	1.5
1987	Detroit	4	0	7.5	.333	–	.500	2.5	.0	.0	.5	2.0
1988	San Antonio	3	0	10.0	**.500**	–	**1.000**	2.7	.7	.0	.3	4.0
1990	Philadelphia	4	0	4.5	.143	–	–	1.0	.0	**.3**	.3	.5
Career		25	0	12.2	.400	–	.783	3.2	.7	.1	.8	2.8

== Honors ==
- Nimphius was inducted into the Wisconsin Basketball Hall of Fame in 2007.
- Nimphius was inducted into the Pac-12 Basketball Hall of Honor during the 2012 Pac-12 Conference men's basketball tournament on March 10, 2012.
- In 2011, Nimphius was inducted into the Arizona State University Sports Hall of Fame.
