= Cadillac Anderson =

American basketball player (born 1964)

Personal information
- Born: June 22, 1964 (age 62) Houston, Texas, U.S.
- Listed height: 6 ft 10 in (2.08 m)
- Listed weight: 230 lb (104 kg)

Career information
- High school: Worthing (Houston, Texas)
- College: Houston (1983–1987)
- NBA draft: 1987: 1st round, 23rd overall pick
- Drafted by: San Antonio Spurs
- Playing career: 1987–2000
- Position: Power forward / center
- Number: 33, 34, 22, 0

Career history
- 1987–1989: San Antonio Spurs
- 1989–1991: Milwaukee Bucks
- 1991: New Jersey Nets
- 1991–1992: Denver Nuggets
- 1992–1993: Phonola Caserta
- 1993–1994: Detroit Pistons
- 1994–1995: Atlanta Hawks
- 1995–1997: San Antonio Spurs
- 1997–1998: Atlanta Hawks
- 1999–2000: Belgrano de San Nicolás

Career highlights
- NBA All-Rookie First Team (1988); First-team All-SWC (1987); Second-team All-SWC (1986)

Career NBA statistics
- Points: 4,953 (7.3 ppg)
- Rebounds: 4,246 (6.2 rpg)
- Stats at NBA.com
- Stats at Basketball Reference

Gregory Wayne "Cadillac" Anderson (born June 22, 1964) is an American former professional basketball player.

== College career ==
He attended and played collegiate basketball at the University of Houston, where he was one of the last original members of the famed Phi Slama Jama “fraternity”. He competed in the 1984 Final Four in Seattle while at Houston.

== Professional career ==
A 6'10" power forward/center, Anderson was selected 23rd overall by the San Antonio Spurs in the 1987 NBA draft. In 1988, he participated in the NBA Slam Dunk Contest where he finished in sixth place. The 1988–89 season, spent with the Spurs, was arguably his most productive, averaging 13.7 points and 8.2 rebounds per game.

In 1989, Anderson was traded to the Bucks along with Alvin Robertson as part of the deal that sent all-star Terry Cummings to the Spurs. On January 8, 1990, Anderson scored a tenure high 28 points along with grabbing 12 rebounds in a 126–113 win over the Charlotte Hornets.

In January 1991, Anderson was traded twice in one week, eventually arriving to Denver as part of the multi-team trade that saw Croatian superstar Dražen Petrović move from Portland to New Jersey. In 1991–92, with the Nuggets, he averaged 11.5 points and a career-best 11.5 rebounds per game.

Then, Anderson signed a one-year contract worth of $2,1 million with Phonola Caserta and spent one year playing in the Italian Lega Basket Serie A in 1992–93, leading the league in rebounding.

Anderson then returned to the NBA, playing mostly as a role player for the Pistons, Hawks, and Spurs again, before finishing his career in Argentina playing for Belgrano de San Nicolás in 2000.

== Personal life ==
As a freshman at the University of Houston, Anderson's mode of transportation around campus was a 10-speed bicycle – an odd sight for someone at 6-foot-10. A friend said the bike "was (Greg's) Cadillac", and the nickname stuck from there.

In October 1998, Anderson pleaded guilty to one count of possession of cocaine with intent to distribute in Biloxi, Mississippi, and was sentenced to five months in prison.

== NBA career statistics ==
Legend
GP	Games played	GS	Games started	MPG	Minutes per game
FG%	Field goal percentage	3P%	3-point field goal percentage	FT%	Free throw percentage
RPG	Rebounds per game	APG	Assists per game	SPG	Steals per game
BPG	Blocks per game	PPG	Points per game	**Bold**	Career high

=== Regular season ===
Year	Team	GP	GS	MPG	FG%	3P%	FT%	RPG	APG	SPG	BPG	PPG
1987–88	San Antonio	**82**	45	24.2	.501	.200	.604	6.3	**1.0**	0.7	**1.5**	11.7
1988–89	San Antonio	**82**	56	29.3	.503	.000	.514	8.2	0.7	1.2	1.3	**13.7**
1989–90	Milwaukee	60	28	21.5	.507	–	.535	6.2	0.4	0.5	0.9	8.8
1990–91	Milwaukee	26	0	9.5	.370	.000	.571	2.9	0.1	0.3	0.3	2.7
1990–91	New Jersey	1	0	18.0	**1.000**	–	–	6.0	**1.0**	**2.0**	0.0	8.0
1990–91	Denver	41	2	16.1	.440	–	.506	5.8	0.3	0.6	0.9	5.2
1991–92	Denver	**82**	**82**	**34.1**	.456	.000	.623	**11.5**	**1.0**	1.1	0.8	11.5
1993–94	Detroit	77	47	21.1	.543	**.333**	.571	7.4	0.7	0.7	0.9	6.4
1994–95	Atlanta	51	0	12.2	.548	–	.479	3.7	0.3	0.5	0.6	2.9
1995–96	San Antonio	46	7	7.5	.511	.000	.240	2.2	0.2	0.2	0.5	1.2
1996–97	San Antonio	**82**	48	20.2	.496	.000	**.667**	5.5	0.4	0.8	0.8	3.9
1997–98	Atlanta	50	0	8.0	.444	.000	.390	2.4	0.3	0.4	0.2	1.8
Career		680	315	20.6	.492	.087	.557	6.2	0.6	0.7	0.9	7.3

=== Playoffs ===
Year	Team	GP	GS	MPG	FG%	3P%	FT%	RPG	APG	SPG	BPG	PPG
1988	San Antonio	3	**3**	**31.7**	.472	–	.444	**7.0**	**1.0**	**0.7**	**1.3**	**12.7**
1990	Milwaukee	4	0	25.3	**.684**	–	.500	6.0	0.0	0.3	1.0	8.3
1995	Atlanta	3	0	13.0	.200	–	**.750**	4.3	0.7	0.7	0.7	1.7
1996	San Antonio	**6**	0	5.7	.000	–	.500	1.5	0.0	0.3	0.2	0.2
1998	Atlanta	1	0	4.0	–	–	.000	2.0	0.0	0.0	1.0	0.0
Career		17	3	16.1	.477	–	.484	4.1	0.3	0.4	0.7	4.5
