= 1987–88 San Antonio Spurs season =

- Head coach: Bob Weiss
- General manager: Bob Bass
- Owner: Angelo Drossos
- Arena: HemisFair Arena

Results
- Record: 31–51 (.378)
- Place: Division: 5th (Midwest); Conference: 8th (Western)
- Playoff finish: First round (lost to Lakers 0–3)
- Stats at Basketball Reference

Local media
- Television: KSAT-TV
- Radio: KTSA

The 1987–88 San Antonio Spurs season was the 12th season for the San Antonio Spurs in the National Basketball Association, and their 21st season as a franchise.

== Season summary ==
=== Off-season ===
This season was most memorable when the Spurs won the NBA draft lottery, and selected 7' 1" center David Robinson from the United States Naval Academy with the first overall pick in the 1987 NBA draft; the team also selected center Greg "Cadillac" Anderson from the University of Houston with the 23rd overall pick. However, Robinson had a two-year commitment to the U.S. Navy after graduating from the Naval Academy, and would not play for the Spurs until the 1989–90 season.

=== Regular season ===
In November, the team traded second-year forward Larry Krystkowiak to the Milwaukee Bucks in exchange for Charles Davis; Krystkowiak previous played overseas in Italy early into the regular season, and was placed on the Spurs' suspended list for violating his contract. Davis would later on be released to free agency after 16 games with the Spurs. With the addition of Anderson, the Spurs got off to a 13–12 start to the regular season, but played below .500 in winning percentage for the remainder of the season, holding an 18–23 record at the All-Star break. The team struggled in the second half of the season, losing 9 of their 13 games in February, and posting a seven-game losing streak in March. Despite finishing in fifth place in the Midwest Division with a 31–51 record, which was ten games under .500, the Spurs earned the eighth seed in the Western Conference, and qualified for the NBA playoffs.

Alvin Robertson averaged 19.6 points, 6.1 rebounds, 6.8 assists and 3.0 steals per game, and was named to the NBA All-Defensive Second Team, while second-year forward Walter Berry averaged 17.4 points and 5.4 rebounds per game, and Frank Brickowski provided the team with 16.0 points, 6.9 rebounds and 3.8 assists per game. In addition, second-year guard Johnny Dawkins provided with 15.8 points, 7.4 assists and 1.4 steals per game, while Mike Mitchell contributed 13.5 points per game, and Anderson averaged 11.7 points, 6.3 rebounds and 1.5 blocks per game, and was named to the NBA All-Rookie Team. Meanwhile, Dave Greenwood provided with 8.6 points and 6.7 rebounds per game, but only played just 45 games due to a season-ending ruptured Achilles tendon, Jon Sundvold contributed 8.1 points and 3.5 assists per game, Kurt Nimphius averaged 4.4 points per game, and Ed Nealy provided with 2.1 points and 3.3 rebounds per game.

During the NBA All-Star weekend at the Chicago Stadium in Chicago, Illinois, Robertson was selected for the 1988 NBA All-Star Game, as a member of the Western Conference All-Star team, while Anderson participated in the NBA Slam Dunk Contest. Robertson also finished in fourth place in Defensive Player of the Year voting, while Brickowski finished tied in sixth place in Most Improved Player voting, and Anderson finished tied in second place in Rookie of the Year voting, behind Mark Jackson of the New York Knicks.

The Spurs finished last in the NBA in home-game attendance, with an attendance of 334,354 at the HemisFair Arena during the regular season, which was 23rd in the league.

=== NBA playoffs ===
In the Western Conference First Round of the 1988 NBA playoffs, the Spurs faced off against the top–seeded, and defending NBA champion Los Angeles Lakers, who won the Pacific Division title, and were led by the quartet of All-Star guard Magic Johnson, All-Star forward James Worthy, Byron Scott and All-Star center Kareem Abdul-Jabbar. The Spurs lost the first two games to the Lakers on the road at the Great Western Forum, before losing Game 3 at home, 109–107 at the HemisFair Arena, thus losing the series in a three-game sweep.

The Lakers would go on to defeat the Detroit Pistons in a full seven-game series in the 1988 NBA Finals, winning their second consecutive NBA championship.

=== Aftermath ===
Following the season, head coach Bob Weiss was fired, while Berry was traded to the New Jersey Nets, Sundvold was left unprotected in the 1988 NBA expansion draft, where he was selected by the Miami Heat expansion team, and Mitchell and Nealy were both released to free agency.

== Draft picks ==
Round	Pick	Player	Position	Nationality	College
1	1	David Robinson	C	United States	Navy
1	23	Cadillac Anderson	PF/C	United States	Houston
2	27	Nate Blackwell	G	United States	Temple
3	50	Phil Zevenbergen	C	United States	Washington
4	73	Todd May		United States	Pikeville
5	96	Dennis Williams		United States	Georgia
6	119	Ricky Brown		United States	South Alabama
7	142	Raynard Davis		United States	Texas

== Roster ==
San Antonio Spurs roster
Players

Pos.	No.	Player	Height	Weight	DOB	From
F/C	33	Cadillac Anderson	6 ft 10 in (2.08 m)	230 lb (104 kg)		Houston
F	6	Walter Berry	6 ft 8 in (2.03 m)	215 lb (98 kg)		St. John's
F	43	Frank Brickowski	6 ft 9 in (2.06 m)	240 lb (109 kg)		Penn State
G	24	Johnny Dawkins	6 ft 2 in (1.88 m)	165 lb (75 kg)		Duke
F	10	Dave Greenwood	6 ft 9 in (2.06 m)	222 lb (101 kg)		UCLA
C	35	Pétur Guðmundsson	7 ft 2 in (2.18 m)	260 lb (118 kg)		Washington
F	34	Mike Mitchell	6 ft 7 in (2.01 m)	215 lb (98 kg)		Auburn
G	9	Pete Myers	6 ft 6 in (1.98 m)	180 lb (82 kg)		Little Rock
F	32	Ed Nealy	6 ft 7 in (2.01 m)	238 lb (108 kg)		Kansas State
F/C	40	Kurt Nimphius	6 ft 10 in (2.08 m)	218 lb (99 kg)		Arizona State
F	42	Richard Rellford	6 ft 6 in (1.98 m)	230 lb (104 kg)		Michigan
G	21	Alvin Robertson	6 ft 3 in (1.91 m)	185 lb (84 kg)		Arkansas
G	20	Jon Sundvold	6 ft 2 in (1.88 m)	170 lb (77 kg)		Missouri
G	15	Ricky Wilson	6 ft 3 in (1.91 m)	195 lb (88 kg)		George Mason
C	41	Phil Zevenbergen	6 ft 10 in (2.08 m)	230 lb (104 kg)		Washington

Coaches
Head coach
- Bob Weiss (Penn State)
Assistant(s)
- Lee Rose (Transylvania)

Legend
- (DP) Unsigned draft pick
- (FA) Free agent
- (S) Suspended
- Injured

== Regular season ==
=== Season standings ===
Midwest Division	W	L	PCT	GB	Home	Road	Div
y-Denver Nuggets	54	28	.659	–	35–6	19–22	18–12
x-Dallas Mavericks	53	29	.646	1	33–8	20–21	20–10
x-Utah Jazz	47	35	.573	7	33–8	14–27	18–12
x-Houston Rockets	46	36	.561	8	31–10	15–26	13–17
x-San Antonio Spurs	31	51	.378	23	23–18	8–33	12–18
Sacramento Kings	24	58	.293	30	19–22	5–36	9–21

#	Western Conference				
#	Team	W	L	PCT	GB
1	z-Los Angeles Lakers	62	20	.756	–
2	y-Denver Nuggets	54	28	.659	8
3	x-Dallas Mavericks	53	29	.646	9
4	x-Portland Trail Blazers	53	29	.646	9
5	x-Utah Jazz	47	35	.573	15
6	x-Houston Rockets	46	36	.561	16
7	x-Seattle SuperSonics	44	38	.537	18
8	x-San Antonio Spurs	31	51	.378	31
9	Phoenix Suns	28	54	.341	34
10	Sacramento Kings	24	58	.293	38
11	Golden State Warriors	20	62	.244	42
12	Los Angeles Clippers	17	65	.207	45

z - clinched division title
y - clinched division title
x - clinched playoff spot

== Game log ==
=== Regular season ===
1987–88 game log
Total: 31-51 (home: 23-18; road: 8-33)
November: 5–8 (home: 4–1; road: 1–7)

Game	Date	Team	Score	High points	High rebounds	High assists	Location Attendance	Record
2	November 7	Dallas	W 130–106				HemisFair Arena	1–1
3	November 10, 1987; 7:30 PM CST	L.A. Lakers	L 124–133				HemisFair Arena; 13,751	1–2
6	November 15, 1987; 9:30 PM CST	@ L.A. Lakers	L 130–147				The Forum; 17,505	2–4
8	November 20	@ Denver	L 142–156				McNichols Sports Arena	3–5
9	November 21	Utah	W 120–119				HemisFair Arena	4–5
12	November 27, 1987; 6:30 PM CST	@ Detroit	L 111–143				Pontiac Silverdome; 30,743	5–7
13	November 28	@ Atlanta	L 100–124				The Omni	5–8

December: 8–4 (home: 7–0; road: 1–4)

Game	Date	Team	Score	High points	High rebounds	High assists	Location Attendance	Record
15	December 5	Chicago	W 110–101				HemisFair Arena	7–8
16	December 8	Utah	W 105–100				HemisFair Arena	8–8
20	December 18	Denver	W 133–114				HemisFair Arena	10–20

January: 4–10 (home: 3–5; road: 1–5)

Game	Date	Team	Score	High points	High rebounds	High assists	Location Attendance	Record
26	January 2	Dallas	L 109–116				HemisFair Arena	13–13
27	January 4, 1988; 9:30 PM CST	@ L.A. Lakers	L 115–133				The Forum; 17,505	13–14
31	January 13	Atlanta	L 110–120				HemisFair Arena	14–17
35	January 22	@ Utah	L 106–119				Salt Palace	15–20
37	January 26	@ Dallas	L 111–128				Reunion Arena	16–21

February: 4–9 (home: 3–5; road: 1–4)

Game	Date	Team	Score	High points	High rebounds	High assists	Location Attendance	Record
41	February 4	Denver	L 123–129				HemisFair Arena	18–23
42	February 9	@ Denver	L 108–136				McNichols Sports Arena	18–24
43	February 10	Boston	L 120–136				HemisFair Arena	18–25
44	February 12, 1988; 7:30 PM CST	L.A. Lakers	L 132–133				HemisFair Arena; 15,770	18–26

March: 5–12 (home: 4–4; road: 1–8)

Game	Date	Team	Score	High points	High rebounds	High assists	Location Attendance	Record
55	March 5	@ Utah	L 106–125				Salt Palace	22–33
57	March 9	@ Boston	L 118–119				Boston Garden	22–35
59	March 12	@ Chicago	L 92–112				Chicago Stadium	22–37
63	March 19	Utah	W 113–110				HemisFair Arena	24–39
65	March 22	@ Denver	L 109–136				McNichols Sports Arena	24–41
66	March 25, 1988; 7:30 PM CST	Detroit	W 107–106				HemisFair Arena; 8,596	25–41
67	March 26	@ Dallas	L 112–131				Reunion Arena	25–42

April: 5–8 (home: 2–3; road: 3–5)

Game	Date	Team	Score	High points	High rebounds	High assists	Location Attendance	Record
74	April 8	Denver	L 124–129 (OT)				HemisFair Arena	28–46
78	April 16	@ Utah	L 82–107				Salt Palace	30–48
79	April 19, 1988; 7:30 PM CDT	L.A. Lakers	L 126–133				HemisFair Arena; 12,456	30–49
81	April 22	@ Dallas	L 96–127				Reunion Arena	31–50
82	April 24	Dallas	L 109–119				HemisFair Arena	31–51

1987–88 schedule

=== Playoffs ===
1988 playoff game log
First Round: 0–3 (home: 0–1; road: 0–2)

Game	Date	Team	Score	High points	High rebounds	High assists	Location Attendance	Series
1	April 29, 1988; 9:30 PM CDT	@ L.A. Lakers	L 110–122	Alvin Robertson (34)	Anderson, Berry (8)	Robertson, Brickowski (5)	The Forum; 17,505	0–1
2	May 1, 1988; 9:30 PM CDT	@ L.A. Lakers	L 112–130	Alvin Robertson (28)	Frank Brickowski (12)	Alvin Robertson (12)	The Forum; 17,505	0–2
3	May 3, 1988; 7:30 PM CDT	L.A. Lakers	L 107–109	Frank Brickowski (27)	Greg Anderson (8)	Alvin Robertson (11)	HemisFair Arena; 11,542	0–3

1988 schedule

== Player statistics ==
=== Ragular season ===
Player	POS	GP	GS	MP	REB	AST	STL	BLK	PTS	MPG	RPG	APG	SPG	BPG	PPG
Alvin Robertson	SG	82	82	2,978	498	557	243	69	1,610	36.3	6.1	6.8	3.0	.8	19.6
Cadillac Anderson	PF	82	45	1,984	513	79	54	122	957	24.2	6.3	1.0	.7	1.5	11.7
Walter Berry	SF	73	56	1,922	395	110	55	63	1,272	26.3	5.4	1.5	.8	.9	17.4
Kurt Nimphius	C	72	7	919	153	53	22	56	316	12.8	2.1	.7	.3	.8	4.4
Frank Brickowski	C	70	68	2,227	483	266	74	36	1,119	31.8	6.9	3.8	1.1	.5	16.0
Pétur Guðmundsson	C	69	9	1,017	323	86	18	61	395	14.7	4.7	1.2	.3	.9	5.7
Mike Mitchell	SF	68	20	1,501	198	68	31	13	919	22.1	2.9	1.0	.5	.2	13.5
Ed Nealy	PF	68	1	837	222	49	29	5	142	12.3	3.3	.7	.4	.1	2.1
Johnny Dawkins	PG	65	61	2,179	204	480	88	2	1,027	33.5	3.1	7.4	1.4	.0	15.8
Jon Sundvold	PG	52	12	1,024	48	183	27	2	421	19.7	.9	3.5	.5	.0	8.1
David Greenwood	PF	45	40	1,236	300	97	33	22	385	27.5	6.7	2.2	.7	.5	8.6
Leon Wood^{†}	PG	38	8	830	51	155	22	1	352	21.8	1.3	4.1	.6	.0	9.3
Pete Myers	SG	22	0	328	37	48	17	6	112	14.9	1.7	2.2	.8	.3	5.1
Ricky Wilson^{†}	PG	18	1	373	26	63	17	3	104	20.7	1.4	3.5	.9	.2	5.8
Charles Davis^{†}	SF	16	0	187	38	17	0	3	92	11.7	2.4	1.1	.0	.2	5.8
Nate Blackwell	PG	10	0	112	6	18	3	0	37	11.2	.6	1.8	.3	.0	3.7
Phil Zevenbergen	C	8	0	58	13	3	3	1	30	7.3	1.6	.4	.4	.1	3.8
Johnny Moore^{†}	PG	4	0	51	4	11	3	0	8	12.8	1.0	2.8	.8	.0	2.0
Richard Rellford	SF	4	0	42	7	1	0	3	16	10.5	1.8	.3	.0	.8	4.0

- ^{†} Denotes player spent time with another team in the season. Stats reflect time with the Spurs only.

=== Playoffs ===
Player	POS	GP	GS	MP	REB	AST	STL	BLK	PTS	MPG	RPG	APG	SPG	BPG	PPG
Alvin Robertson	SG	3	3	119	14	28	12	1	70	39.7	4.7	9.3	4.0	.3	23.3
Frank Brickowski	C	3	3	113	22	14	6	2	58	37.7	7.3	4.7	2.0	.7	19.3
Cadillac Anderson	PF	3	3	95	21	3	2	4	38	31.7	7.0	1.0	.7	1.3	12.7
Jon Sundvold	PG	3	3	90	4	15	4	0	35	30.0	1.3	5.0	1.3	.0	11.7
Mike Mitchell	SF	3	3	74	15	4	1	1	31	24.7	5.0	1.3	.3	.3	10.3
Walter Berry	SF	3	0	94	21	6	5	2	66	31.3	7.0	2.0	1.7	.7	22.0
Johnny Dawkins	PG	3	0	53	3	5	2	0	15	17.7	1.0	1.7	.7	.0	5.0
Kurt Nimphius	C	3	0	30	8	2	0	1	12	10.0	2.7	.7	.0	.3	4.0
Ed Nealy	PF	2	0	36	7	4	1	0	4	18.0	3.5	2.0	.5	.0	2.0
Ricky Wilson	PG	2	0	9	0	1	0	0	0	4.5	.0	.5	.0	.0	.0
Pétur Guðmundsson	C	2	0	6	0	1	0	0	0	3.0	.0	.5	.0	.0	.0
Phil Zevenbergen	C	1	0	1	0	0	0	0	0	1.0	.0	.0	.0	.0	.0

== Awards and records ==
- Alvin Robertson, NBA All-Defensive Second Team
- Cadillac Anderson, NBA All-Rookie Team 1st Team

== See also ==
- 1987-88 NBA season
