= Frank Brickowski =

American basketball player (born 1959)

Personal information
- Born: August 14, 1959 (age 67) Bayville, New York, U.S.
- Listed height: 6 ft 9 in (2.06 m)
- Listed weight: 240 lb (109 kg)

Career information
- High school: Locust Valley Central School (Locust Valley, New York)
- College: Penn State (1977–1981)
- NBA draft: 1981: 3rd round, 57th overall pick
- Drafted by: New York Knicks
- Playing career: 1981–1997
- Position: Power forward / center
- Number: 34, 33, 43, 40

Career history
- 1981–1982: Cagiva Varese
- 1982–1983: Reims CAUFA
- 1983–1984: Maccabi Tel Aviv
- 1984–1986: Seattle SuperSonics
- 1986–1987: Los Angeles Lakers
- 1987–1990: San Antonio Spurs
- 1990–1994: Milwaukee Bucks
- 1994: Charlotte Hornets
- 1995–1996: Seattle SuperSonics
- 1996–1997: Boston Celtics

Career NBA statistics
- Points: 7,302 (10.0 ppg)
- Rebounds: 3,410 (4.7 rpg)
- Assists: 1,384 (1.9 apg)
- Stats at NBA.com
- Stats at Basketball Reference

Francis Anthony Brickowski (born August 14, 1959) is an American former professional basketball player, who started his career playing 3 seasons overseas before playing 13 seasons in the National Basketball Association (NBA).

== College and overseas career ==
Born in Bayville, New York, Brickowski played college basketball for four years as a power forward/center for Penn State. He won the John Lawther Award in 1980 as Penn State's MVP.

Brickowski was then selected with the 11th pick of the third round of the 1981 NBA draft by the New York Knicks. The Knicks considered him not quite ready for the NBA, so he began his professional basketball career in Italy. After a year in Italy, he played for another year in France, and the Knicks relinquished their draft rights after the 1982–83 NBA season. Brickowski then played another season overseas for Maccabi Tel Aviv in Israel.

== NBA career ==
=== Seattle SuperSonics ===
Brickowski signed with the Seattle SuperSonics for the 1984–85 season on September 23, 1984, arriving in the league three years after being drafted. He played in Seattle two seasons.

=== Los Angeles Lakers ===
He signed on with the Los Angeles Lakers on October 8, 1986, but only played part of one season.

=== San Antonio Spurs ===
The Lakers traded him to the San Antonio Spurs, along with Pétur Guðmundsson, two draft choices and cash, for Mychal Thompson. Although Brickowski only played 7 games the rest of that season, he played 3 more productive seasons for San Antonio, including scoring a career-high 16 points per game during the 1987–88 season.

=== Milwaukee Bucks ===
During the 1990 off-season, the salary cap went up, which led to Brickowski being traded to the Milwaukee Bucks for Paul Pressey, to which the Bucks agreed due to an injury to Larry Krystkowiak. On March, 22, 1991, Brickowski scored 32 points and grabbed 8 rebounds in a 99–92 victory in Los Angeles against the Lakers. Although the Bucks finished with a respectable 48–34 record, they would be surprisingly swept by Charles Barkley and the Philadelphia 76ers in the first round of the playoffs. The Bucks would not return to the playoffs until the 1998–99 season. He was a productive player during his time in Milwaukee. During 1991–92, Brickowski was found with an ounce of cannabis at his Montana ranch. He pleaded guilty, and was forced to pay a $2,000 fine and undergo drug counseling.

=== Charlotte Hornets ===
At the 1994 trading deadline, The Bucks traded Brickowski to the Charlotte Hornets with a first-round draft pick for Mike Gminski. He spent the rest of the season with Charlotte.

=== Sacramento Kings ===
The next season Brickowski joined the Sacramento Kings. However, he injured his shoulder during preseason, aggravating the injury in a practice in January, and ended up being lost for the entire season.

=== Return to Seattle ===
Brickowski signed for a second stint with Seattle, in which he became a prominent contributor in terms of three-pointers, hitting 32 of 79 (.405). He helped Seattle to make it to the 1996 NBA Finals against Chicago Bulls. During that series, Brickowski couldn't play his very physical defense against Dennis Rodman that led to several technical and flagrant fouls.

=== Boston Celtics ===
Brickowski signed as a free agent with the Boston Celtics on August 1, 1996. After only 17 games, he was released on July 7, 1997, and retired, holding career averages of 10 points, 5 rebounds and two assists per game, in 731 contests.

== After the NBA ==
One year after he retired in 1997, Brickowski joined a team of retired NBA players on a tour of China for a series of exhibition games against the Chinese national team.

Brickowski currently works with the NBA Players Association and lives in Montana.

In a 2020 interview, Brickowski recounted one of the "wildest" moments of his life: "Charles Oakley comes up behind me and grabs me and we laugh. He gets a phone call and he says, ‘I’m talking with Brick,’ and then he says to me, ‘Let’s go.’ So I just follow him out the door, we go to this other tower and we up and we go to Michael Jordan’s suite and he has a gambling game still going on from the night before. It’s nine o’clock in the morning and I look around the room and all I see is piles of cash. My mind goes to, ‘We’ll put sleeping gas under the door, everyone will get knocked out and we’ll split the profits.’ I saw Oakley later that night and said, ‘Oak, how much money was in that room? There must have been a million dollars in that room.’ He held up two fingers – there was $2 million in cash in that room."

== NBA career statistics ==
Legend
GP	Games played	GS	Games started	MPG	Minutes per game
FG%	Field goal percentage	3P%	3-point field goal percentage	FT%	Free throw percentage
RPG	Rebounds per game	APG	Assists per game	SPG	Steals per game
BPG	Blocks per game	PPG	Points per game	**Bold**	Career high

=== Regular season ===
Year	Team	GP	GS	MPG	FG%	3P%	FT%	RPG	APG	SPG	BPG	PPG
1984–85	Seattle	**78**	9	14.3	.492	.000	.669	3.3	1.3	0.4	0.2	4.9
1985–86	Seattle	40	2	7.8	.517	–	.667	1.4	0.5	0.3	0.2	2.0
1986–87	L.A. Lakers	37	0	10.9	**.564**	–	.678	2.6	0.3	0.4	0.1	3.9
1986–87	San Antonio	7	0	11.9	.333	.000	**.909**	2.7	0.7	0.9	0.3	4.3
1987–88	San Antonio	70	68	31.8	.528	.200	.768	**6.9**	**3.8**	1.1	0.5	16.0
1988–89	San Antonio	64	60	28.5	.515	.000	.715	6.3	2.0	**1.6**	0.5	13.7
1989–90	San Antonio	**78**	12	18.4	.545	.000	.674	4.2	1.3	0.8	0.5	6.6
1990–91	Milwaukee	75	**73**	25.5	.527	.000	.798	5.7	1.7	1.1	0.6	12.6
1991–92	Milwaukee	65	60	23.9	.524	**.500**	.767	5.3	1.9	0.9	0.4	11.4
1992–93	Milwaukee	66	64	31.4	.545	.308	.728	6.1	3.0	1.2	**0.7**	**16.9**
1993–94	Milwaukee	43	40	**33.5**	.482	.167	.775	6.5	**3.8**	1.2	0.4	15.2
1993–94	Charlotte	28	6	23.3	.502	**.500**	.746	4.5	2.0	1.0	0.4	10.1
1995–96	Seattle	63	8	15.7	.488	.405	.709	2.4	0.9	0.4	0.1	5.4
1996–97	Boston	17	2	15.0	.438	.350	.714	2.0	0.9	0.3	0.2	4.8
Career		731	404	22.3	.519	.324	.740	4.7	1.9	0.9	0.4	10.0

=== Playoffs ===
Year	Team	GP	GS	MPG	FG%	3P%	FT%	RPG	APG	SPG	BPG	PPG
1988	San Antonio	3	**3**	**37.7**	.500	**1.000**	.684	7.3	**4.7**	**2.0**	**0.7**	**19.3**
1990	San Antonio	10	0	16.1	**.574**	–	.654	4.4	1.1	0.8	0.1	7.9
1991	Milwaukee	3	**3**	36.7	.533	.000	.500	**8.7**	1.0	0.3	**0.7**	18.3
1996	Seattle	**21**	**3**	9.8	.421	.273	**.750**	1.4	0.5	0.3	0.2	2.0
Career		37	9	15.9	.514	.280	.635	3.3	1.1	0.6	0.3	6.3

== Recognition ==
Brickowski's surname is believed to be the inspiration for the character Emmet Brickowski (voiced by Chris Pratt) from The Lego Movie.
