= David Greenwood =

American basketball player (1957–2025)

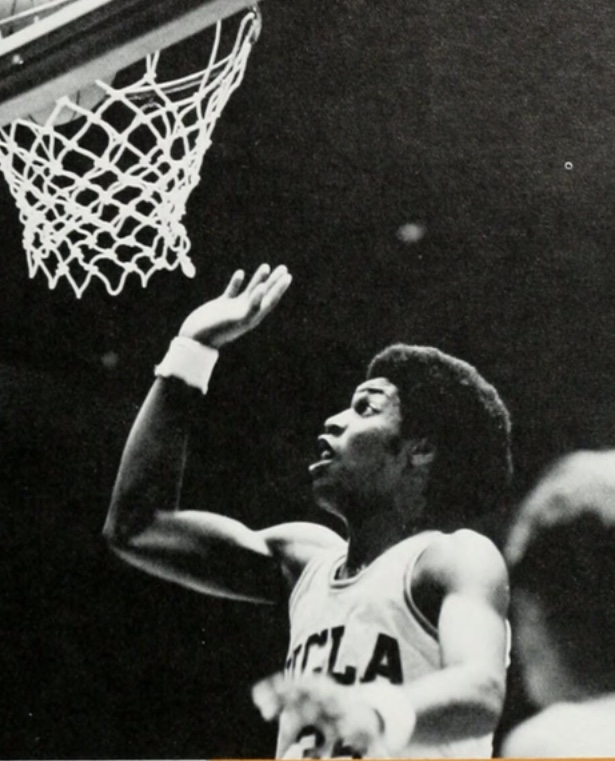
- Greenwood with UCLA in 1977–78

Personal information
- Born: May 27, 1957 Lynwood, California, U.S.
- Died: June 8, 2025 (aged 68) Riverside, California, U.S.
- Listed height: 6 ft 9 in (2.06 m)
- Listed weight: 222 lb (101 kg)

Career information
- High school: Verbum Dei (Los Angeles, California)
- College: UCLA (1975–1979)
- NBA draft: 1979: 1st round, 2nd overall pick
- Drafted by: Chicago Bulls
- Playing career: 1979–1991
- Position: Power forward / center
- Number: 34, 10, 22, 33

Career history
- 1979–1985: Chicago Bulls
- 1985–1989: San Antonio Spurs
- 1989: Denver Nuggets
- 1989–1990: Detroit Pistons
- 1990–1991: San Antonio Spurs

Career highlights
- NBA champion (1990); NBA All-Rookie First Team (1980); 2× Consensus first-team All-American (1978, 1979); 2× Pac-10 Player of the Year (1978, 1979); 3× First-team All-Pac-10 (1977–1979); First-team Parade All-American (1975)

Career statistics
- Points: 8,428 (10.2 ppg)
- Rebounds: 6,537 (7.9 rpg)
- Assists: 1,614 (2.0 apg)
- Stats at NBA.com
- Stats at Basketball Reference
- Collegiate Basketball Hall of Fame

David Murphy-Kasim Greenwood (May 27, 1957 – June 8, 2025) was an American professional basketball player whose National Basketball Association (NBA) career spanned 12 years from 1979 to 1991. He played college basketball for the UCLA Bruins, earning consensus All-American honors twice in 1978 and 1979. Greenwood was selected by the Chicago Bulls in the first round of the 1979 NBA draft with the second overall pick. He was named to the NBA All-Rookie First Team with the Bulls during the 1979–80 season. A forward/center, he also played in the NBA with the San Antonio Spurs, Denver Nuggets and Detroit Pistons.

== College career ==
Following a standout high school career at Verbum Dei High School, Greenwood attended the nearby University of California, Los Angeles, from 1975 to 1979. He started all four seasons for the Bruins, earning consensus first-team All-American and Pac-10 Conference Player of the Year (now Pac-12) honors in his junior and senior seasons.

Greenwood was inducted into the Pac-12 Hall of Honor in 2017 and the National Collegiate Basketball Hall of Fame in 2021. As of the conclusion of the 2024–25 season, he ranked No. 15 all-time in points at UCLA (1,721) and No. 4 all-time in rebounds (1,022).

== Professional career ==
Greenwood was the second overall pick of the 1979 NBA draft. The Chicago Bulls lost the coin toss to the Los Angeles Lakers, who drafted future Hall of Famer Earvin "Magic" Johnson with the first overall pick, acquired in a trade with the New Orleans Jazz.

As a rookie, Greenwood was an immediate starter for the Bulls. He averaged 16.3 points per game and led Chicago with 9.4 rebounds per game. Greenwood was selected for the 1979–80 NBA All-Rookie Team alongside Johnson and Larry Bird.

Before the Michael Jordan era in Chicago, Greenwood was one of the franchise's marquee players along with Reggie Theus and Orlando Woolridge. On October 24, 1985, Greenwood was traded by the Bulls to the San Antonio Spurs in exchange for future Hall of Famer George Gervin.

On January 26, 1989, Greenwood and Spurs teammate, Darwin Cook were traded to the Denver Nuggets for Calvin Natt and Jay Vincent. On October 6, 1989, Greenwood signed as an unrestricted free agent with the Detroit Pistons, whom he would assist in a victorious effort in the 1990 NBA Finals as a reserve. He would later sign as an unrestricted free agent with the San Antonio Spurs on August 17, 1990, until his release on May 21, 1991.

== Later life and death ==
Following his NBA career, Greenwood owned several Blockbuster Video stores and coached high school basketball at his alma mater, Verbum Dei, where his teams won the California state championships in 1998 and 1999.

Greenwood died from cancer in Riverside, California, on June 8, 2025, at the age of 68.

== NBA career statistics ==
Legend
GP	Games played	GS	Games started	MPG	Minutes per game
FG%	Field goal percentage	3P%	3-point field goal percentage	FT%	Free throw percentage
RPG	Rebounds per game	APG	Assists per game	SPG	Steals per game
BPG	Blocks per game	PPG	Points per game	**Bold**	Career high
†	Won an NBA championship

=== Regular season ===
Year	Team	GP	GS	MPG	FG%	3P%	FT%	RPG	APG	SPG	BPG	PPG
1979–80	Chicago	**82**	**82**	34.0	.474	.143	.810	9.4	2.2	0.7	**1.6**	**16.3**
1980–81	Chicago	**82**	**82**	33.0	.486	.000	.748	8.8	2.7	**0.9**	1.5	14.4
1981–82	Chicago	**82**	**82**	**35.5**	.473	.000	**.825**	9.6	**3.2**	**0.9**	1.1	14.6
1982–83	Chicago	79	61	29.8	.455	.000	.708	9.7	1.9	0.7	1.1	10.0
1983–84	Chicago	78	76	34.8	.490	.000	.737	**10.1**	1.8	**0.9**	0.9	12.2
1984–85	Chicago	61	28	25.0	.458	.000	.713	6.4	1.3	0.6	0.3	6.1
1985–86	San Antonio	68	24	28.1	.510	.000	.772	7.8	1.3	0.5	0.8	7.9
1986–87	San Antonio	79	78	32.7	**.513**	**.500**	.785	9.9	3.0	**0.9**	0.6	11.9
1987–88	San Antonio	45	40	27.5	.460	.000	.748	6.7	2.2	0.7	0.5	8.6
1988–89	San Antonio	38	15	24.0	.425	—	.800	6.3	1.4	0.8	0.6	7.7
1988–89	Denver	29	3	16.9	.419	—	.676	5.7	1.4	0.6	1.0	5.9
1989–90†	Detroit	37	0	5.5	.423	—	.552	2.1	0.3	0.1	0.2	1.6
1990–91	San Antonio	63	11	16.2	.503	.000	.734	3.5	0.8	0.5	0.4	3.8
Career		823	582	28.4	.477	.138	.765	7.9	2.0	0.7	0.9	10.2

=== Playoffs ===
Year	Team	GP	GS	MPG	FG%	3P%	FT%	RPG	APG	SPG	BPG	PPG
1981	Chicago	**6**	—	**35.3**	.586	.000	.417	7.3	**1.8**	**1.5**	0.8	**17.8**
1985	Chicago	4	**4**	34.8	.536	—	**.800**	**7.8**	1.3	**1.5**	**1.0**	9.5
1986	San Antonio	3	3	33.7	.522	—	.750	6.0	1.0	1.0	0.3	10.0
1989	Denver	3	0	11.3	.333	—	.500	3.7	0.3	0.3	0.3	1.7
1990†	Detroit	5	0	9.4	.500	—	.250	1.8	0.0	0.4	0.1	1.0
1991	San Antonio	1	0	5.0	**1.000**	—	—	2.0	2.0	0.0	0.0	2.0
Career		22	7	24.5	.557	.000	.583	5.2	1.0	1.0	0.5	8.5
