= 1988–89 San Antonio Spurs season =

- Head coach: Larry Brown
- General manager: Bob Bass
- Owner: Red McCombs
- Arena: HemisFair Arena

Results
- Record: 21–61 (.256)
- Place: Division: 5th (Midwest); Conference: 12th (Western)
- Playoff finish: Did not qualify
- Stats at Basketball Reference

Local media
- Television: KSAT-TV; KABB; Home Sports Entertainment (Dave Barnett)
- Radio: WOAI (Dave Barnett)

The 1988–89 San Antonio Spurs season was the 13th season for the San Antonio Spurs in the National Basketball Association, and their 22nd season as a franchise.

== Season summary ==
=== Off-season ===
The Spurs received the tenth overall pick in the 1988 NBA draft, and selected shooting guard Willie Anderson from the University of Georgia; the team also acquired rookie shooting guard, and second-round draft pick Vernon Maxwell out of the University of Florida from the Denver Nuggets on draft day. During the off-season, the Spurs hired Larry Brown as their new head coach, acquired Albert King from the Philadelphia 76ers, acquired second-year forward Dallas Comegys from the New Jersey Nets, and later on signed Darwin Cook during the first month of the regular season.

=== Regular season ===
Under Brown, and with the addition of Willie Anderson and Maxwell, the Spurs struggled posting an eight-game losing streak in December, posted a seven-game losing streak in January, and later on held a 13–33 record at the All-Star break. At mid-season, the team traded Cook, and Dave Greenwood to the Nuggets in exchange for Jay Vincent, and Calvin Natt; in March, the team signed rookie shooting guard Anthony Bowie. The Spurs continued to struggle posting a 13-game losing streak between February and March, and then posted a nine-game losing streak to end the season, finishing in fifth place in the Midwest Division with an awful 21–61 record.

Willie Anderson averaged 18.6 points, 5.1 rebounds, 4.6 assists and 1.9 steals per game, and was named to the NBA All-Rookie First Team, while Alvin Robertson averaged 17.3 points, 5.9 rebounds, 6.0 assists and 3.0 steals per game, and was named to the NBA All-Defensive Second Team. In addition, Johnny Dawkins contributed 14.2 points, 7.0 assists and 1.7 steals per game, but only played just 32 games due to a leg injury, while second-year center Greg Anderson provided the team with 13.7 points, 8.2 rebounds and 1.3 blocks per game, Frank Brickowski provided with 13.7 points, 6.3 rebounds and 1.6 steals per game, and Maxwell contributed 11.7 points and 3.8 assists per game. Meanwhile, Vincent averaged 9.0 points and 3.8 rebounds per game in 24 games after the trade, Bowie contributed 8.6 points per game in 18 games, Natt averaged 8.5 points and 3.2 rebounds per game in ten games, King provided with 7.1 points per game, but only appeared in just 46 games, and Comegys averaged 6.5 points and 3.5 rebounds per game. Willie Anderson also finished in second place in Rookie of the Year voting, behind Mitch Richmond of the Golden State Warriors.

The Spurs finished 23rd in the NBA in home-game attendance, with an attendance of 323,573 at the HemisFair Arena during the regular season, which was the third-lowest in the league.

=== Aftermath ===
Following the season, Robertson and Greg Anderson were both traded to the Milwaukee Bucks, while Dawkins was traded to the Philadelphia 76ers, Bowie signed as a free agent with the Houston Rockets, and Vincent, Natt, King and Comegys were all released to free agency.

== Draft picks ==
Round	Pick	Player	Position	Nationality	College
1	10	Willie Anderson	SF/SG	United States	Georgia
2	27	Shelton Jones	SF	United States	St. John's
3	56	Barry Sumpter	PF/C	United States	Austin Peay State
3	75	Archie Marshall	SF	United States	Kansas

== Roster ==
1988–89 San Antonio Spurs roster
Players

Pos.	No.	Player	Height	Weight	DOB	From
F/C	33	Cadillac Anderson	6 ft 10 in (2.08 m)	230 lb (104 kg)	1964–06–22	Houston
G/F	40	Willie Anderson	6 ft 7 in (2.01 m)	190 lb (86 kg)	1967–01–08	Georgia
G	25	Anthony Bowie	6 ft 6 in (1.98 m)	190 lb (86 kg)	1963–11–09	Oklahoma
F	43	Frank Brickowski	6 ft 9 in (2.06 m)	240 lb (109 kg)	1959–08–14	Penn State
F	22	Dallas Comegys	6 ft 9 in (2.06 m)	205 lb (93 kg)	1964–08–17	DePaul
G	24	Johnny Dawkins	6 ft 2 in (1.88 m)	165 lb (75 kg)	1963–09–28	Duke
G	11	Vernon Maxwell	6 ft 4 in (1.93 m)	180 lb (82 kg)	1965–09–12	Florida
F	7	Calvin Natt	6 ft 6 in (1.98 m)	220 lb (100 kg)	1957–01–08	Louisiana–Monroe
G	21	Alvin Robertson	6 ft 3 in (1.91 m)	185 lb (84 kg)	1962–07–22	Arkansas
F	3	Scott Roth	6 ft 8 in (2.03 m)	212 lb (96 kg)	1963–06–03	Wisconsin
F/C	52	Mike Smrek	7 ft 0 in (2.13 m)	250 lb (113 kg)	1962–08–31	Canisius
F	31	Jay Vincent	6 ft 7 in (2.01 m)	220 lb (100 kg)	1959–06–10	Michigan State
C	6	Jerome Whitehead	6 ft 10 in (2.08 m)	220 lb (100 kg)	1956–09–30	Marquette

Coaches
Head coach
- Larry Brown
Assistant(s)
- R. C. Buford
- Alvin Gentry
- Ed Manning
- Gregg Popovich

Legend
- (DP) Unsigned draft pick
- (FA) Free agent
- (S) Suspended
- Injured

== Regular season ==
=== Season standings ===
Midwest Division	W	L	PCT	GB	Home	Road	Div
y-Utah Jazz	51	31	.622	–	34–7	17–24	19–11
x-Houston Rockets	45	37	.549	6	31–10	14–27	19–11
x-Denver Nuggets	44	38	.537	7	35–6	9–32	18–12
Dallas Mavericks	38	44	.463	13	24–17	14–27	19–11
San Antonio Spurs	21	61	.256	30	18–23	3–38	9–21
Miami Heat	15	67	.183	36	12–29	3–38	6–24

#	Western Conference				
#	Team	W	L	PCT	GB
1	c-Los Angeles Lakers	57	25	.695	–
2	y-Utah Jazz	51	31	.622	6
3	x-Phoenix Suns	55	27	.671	2
4	x-Seattle SuperSonics	47	35	.573	10
5	x-Houston Rockets	45	37	.549	12
6	x-Denver Nuggets	44	38	.537	13
7	x-Golden State Warriors	43	39	.524	14
8	x-Portland Trail Blazers	39	43	.476	18
9	Dallas Mavericks	38	44	.463	19
10	Sacramento Kings	27	55	.329	30
11	San Antonio Spurs	21	61	.256	36
12	Los Angeles Clippers	21	61	.256	36
13	Miami Heat	15	67	.183	42

z - clinched division title
y - clinched division title
x - clinched playoff spot

== Game log ==
=== Regular season ===
1988–89 game log
Total: 21–61 (Home: 18–23; Road: 3–38)
November: 5–8 (home: 4–3; road: 1–5)

Game	Date	Team	Score	High points	High rebounds	High assists	Location Attendance	Record
1	November 5, 1988	L.A. Lakers	W 122–107				HemisFair Arena	1–0
2	November 8, 1988	@ Houston	L 102–120				The Summit	1–1
3	November 9, 1988	Miami	W 117–93				HemisFair Arena	2–1
4	November 11, 1988	@ Dallas	L 102–115				Reunion Arena	2–2
5	November 12, 1988	Utah	L 96–105				HemisFair Arena	2–3
6	November 16, 1988	Detroit	L 88–94				HemisFair Arena	2–4
7	November 17, 1988	@ Denver	L 112–139				McNichols Sports Arena	2–5
8	November 19, 1988	Charlotte	L 105–107				HemisFair Arena	2–6
9	November 23, 1988	Atlanta	W 119–109				HemisFair Arena	3–6
10	November 25, 1988	@ Utah	L 95–115				Salt Palace	3–7
11	November 26, 1988	Phoenix	W 117–104				HemisFair Arena	4–7
12	November 29, 1988	@ Atlanta	L 104–120				The Omni	4–8
13	November 30, 1988	@ Miami	W 105–101				Miami Arena	5–8

December: 2–12 (home: 2–5; road: 0–7)

Game	Date	Team	Score	High points	High rebounds	High assists	Location Attendance	Record
14	December 3, 1988	New York	W 122–109				HemisFair Arena	6–8
15	December 6, 1988	Seattle	L 107–112				HemisFair Arena	6–9
16	December 8, 1988	Cleveland	L 95–104				HemisFair Arena	6–10
17	December 11, 1988	@ Portland	L 123–128 (OT)				Memorial Coliseum	6–11
18	December 13, 1988	@ Sacramento	L 89–108				ARCO Arena	6–12
19	December 15, 1988	@ Seattle	L 107–122				Seattle Center Coliseum	6–13
20	December 17, 1988	Golden State	L 113–123				HemisFair Arena	6–14
21	December 18, 1988	@ Houston	L 109–120				The Summit	6–15
22	December 20, 1988	@ Phoenix	L 110–128				Arizona Veterans Memorial Coliseum	6–16
23	December 21, 1988	Sacramento	W 125–107				HemisFair Arena	7–16
24	December 23, 1988	L.A. Clippers	L 108–114				HemisFair Arena	7–17
25	December 26, 1988	@ Miami	L 109–111				Miami Arena	7–18
26	December 27, 1988	@ Dallas	L 101–110				Reunion Arena	7–19
27	December 30, 1988	Boston	L 99–112				HemisFair Arena	7–20

January: 5–10 (home: 4–4; road: 1–6)

Game	Date	Team	Score	High points	High rebounds	High assists	Location Attendance	Record
28	January 3, 1989	Denver	W 129–105				HemisFair Arena	8–20
29	January 5, 1989	Philadelphia	W 119–104				HemisFair Arena	9–20
30	January 7, 1989	@ Golden State	W 104–102				Oakland-Alameda County Coliseum Arena	10–20
31	January 8, 1989	@ L.A. Lakers	L 96–126				Great Western Forum	10–21
32	January 11, 1989	Houston	L 117–122 (2OT)				HemisFair Arena	10–22
33	January 12, 1989	@ Utah	L 91–115				Salt Palace	10–23
34	January 14, 1989	Portland	L 99–103				HemisFair Arena	10–24
35	January 16, 1989	@ New York	L 106–116				Madison Square Garden	10–25
36	January 17, 1989	@ New Jersey	L 112–117				Brendan Byrne Arena	10–26
37	January 19, 1989	@ Washington	L 112–115				Capital Centre	10–27
38	January 23, 1989	Miami	W 119–101				HemisFair Arena	11–27
39	January 25, 1989	Utah	L 103–117				HemisFair Arena	10–29
40	January 27, 1989	@ Dallas	L 82–126				Reunion Arena	10–30
41	January 28, 1989	Houston	L 91–96				HemisFair Arena	11–30
42	January 31, 1989	Denver	W 117–111				HemisFair Arena	12–30

February: 1–12 (home: 0–3; road: 1–9)

Game	Date	Team	Score	High points	High rebounds	High assists	Location Attendance	Record
43	February 3, 1989	@ L.A. Clippers	W 106–101				Los Angeles Memorial Sports Arena	13–30
44	February 4, 1989	@ Portland	L 100–137				Memorial Coliseum	13–31
45	February 7, 1989	@ Sacramento	L 99–114				ARCO Arena	13–32
46	February 9, 1989	Chicago	L 103–108				HemisFair Arena	13–33
47	February 14, 1989	@ Seattle	L 113–129				Seattle Center Coliseum	13–34
48	February 15, 1989	@ Golden State	L 96–133				Oakland-Alameda County Coliseum Arena	13–35
49	February 18, 1989	@ Utah	L 93–107				Salt Palace	13–38
50	February 20, 1989	Dallas	L 93–105				HemisFair Arena	13–37
51	February 22, 1989	Golden State	L 107–118				HemisFair Arena	13–38
52	February 24, 1989	@ Indiana	L 93–112				Market Square Arena	13–39
53	February 25, 1989	@ Charlotte	L 113–124				Charlotte Coliseum	13–40
54	February 27, 1989	@ Milwaukee	L 96–105				Bradley Center	13–41
55	February 28, 1989	@ Chicago	L 102–121				Chicago Stadium	13–42

March: 6–10 (home: 6–2; road: 0–8)

Game	Date	Team	Score	High points	High rebounds	High assists	Location Attendance	Record
56	March 2, 1989	@ Cleveland	L 84–112				Richfield Coliseum	13–43
57	March 4, 1989	Denver	W 106–89				HemisFair Arena	14–43
58	March 7, 1989	Portland	L 103–116				HemisFair Arena	14–44
59	March 9, 1989	New Jersey	W 112–98				HemisFair Arena	15–44
60	March 11, 1989	Dallas	W 97–90				HemisFair Arena	16–44
61	March 13, 1989	L.A. Clippers	L 103–115				HemisFair Arena	17–44
62	March 15, 1989	Milwaukee	W 110–108				HemisFair Arena	17–45
63	March 16, 1989	@ Denver	L 102–119				McNichols Sports Arena	17–46
64	March 18, 1989	Utah	W 114–98				HemisFair Arena	18–46
65	March 20, 1989	@ Boston	L 108–119				Boston Garden	18–47
66	March 22, 1989	@ Detroit	L 94–115				The Palace of Auburn Hills	18–48
67	March 24, 1989	@ Philadelphia	L 122–135				The Spectrum	18–49
68	March 25, 1989	@ Miami	L 105–107				Miami Arena	18–50
69	March 28, 1989	Washington	W 130–114				HemisFair Arena	19–50
70	March 30, 1989	@ L.A. Lakers	L 98–138				Great Western Forum	19–51
71	March 31, 1989	@ L.A. Clippers	L 106–109				Los Angeles Memorial Sports Arena	19–52

April: 2–9 (home: 2–6; road: 0–3)

Game	Date	Team	Score	High points	High rebounds	High assists	Location Attendance	Record
72	April 4, 1989	Miami	W 109–87				HemisFair Arena	20–52
73	April 6, 1989	Sacramento	W 122–116				HemisFair Arena	21–52
74	April 8, 1989	Indiana	L 126–128 (OT)				HemisFair Arena	21–53
75	April 10, 1989	Seattle	L 89–102				HemisFair Arena	21–54
76	April 12, 1989	L.A. Lakers	L 100–107				HemisFair Arena	21–55
77	April 14, 1989	Dallas	L 110–118				HemisFair Arena	21–56
78	April 15, 1989	@ Phoenix	L 91–137				Arizona Veterans Memorial Coliseum	21–57
79	April 17, 1989	@ Houston	L 91–99				The Summit	21–58
80	April 19, 1989	Houston	L 84–99				HemisFair Arena	21–59
81	April 20, 1989	@ Denver	L 113–136				McNichols Sports Arena	21–60
82	April 22, 1989	Phoenix	L 111–121				HemisFair Arena	21–61

1988–89 schedule

== Player statistics ==
=== Ragular season ===
Player	POS	GP	GS	MP	REB	AST	STL	BLK	PTS	MPG	RPG	APG	SPG	BPG	PPG
Cadillac Anderson	PF	82	56	2,401	676	61	102	103	1,127	29.3	8.2	.7	1.2	1.3	13.7
Willie Anderson	SF	81	79	2,738	417	372	150	62	1,508	33.8	5.1	4.6	1.9	.8	18.6
Vernon Maxwell	SG	79	36	2,065	202	301	86	8	927	26.1	2.6	3.8	1.1	.1	11.7
Dallas Comegys	PF	67	10	1,119	234	30	42	63	438	16.7	3.5	.4	.6	.9	6.5
Alvin Robertson	SG	65	65	2,287	384	393	197	36	1,122	35.2	5.9	6.0	3.0	.6	17.3
Frank Brickowski	C	64	60	1,822	406	131	102	35	875	28.5	6.3	2.0	1.6	.5	13.7
Jerome Whitehead^{†}	C	52	4	580	129	17	22	4	168	11.2	2.5	.3	.4	.1	3.2
Scott Roth^{†}	SF	47	3	464	56	48	19	4	158	9.9	1.2	1.0	.4	.1	3.4
Albert King	SF	46	11	791	140	79	27	7	327	17.2	3.0	1.7	.6	.2	7.1
Mike Smrek	PF	43	18	623	129	12	13	58	193	14.5	3.0	.3	.3	1.3	4.5
David Greenwood^{†}	PF	38	15	912	238	55	30	24	294	24.0	6.3	1.4	.8	.6	7.7
Michael Anderson	PG	36	12	730	89	153	44	3	204	20.3	2.5	4.3	1.2	.1	5.7
Darwin Cook^{†}	SG	36	0	757	59	84	43	4	346	21.0	1.6	2.3	1.2	.1	9.6
Johnny Dawkins	PG	32	30	1,083	101	224	55	0	454	33.8	3.2	7.0	1.7	.0	14.2
Jay Vincent^{†}	SF	24	3	551	92	22	5	3	217	23.0	3.8	.9	.2	.1	9.0
Anthony Bowie	SG	18	5	438	56	29	18	4	155	24.3	3.1	1.6	1.0	.2	8.6
Calvin Natt^{†}	SF	10	0	185	32	11	2	2	85	18.5	3.2	1.1	.2	.2	8.5
Shelton Jones^{†}	SF	7	0	92	16	7	2	2	26	13.1	2.3	1.0	.3	.3	3.7
Pétur Guðmundsson	C	5	3	70	16	5	1	1	21	14.0	3.2	1.0	.2	.2	4.2
Todd Mitchell^{†}	SF	2	0	33	3	1	1	0	5	16.5	1.5	.5	.5	.0	2.5
Keith Smart	PG	2	0	12	1	2	0	0	2	6.0	.5	1.0	.0	.0	1.0
John Stroeder^{†}	PF	1	0	2	0	0	0	0	0	2.0	.0	.0	.0	.0	.0

- ^{†} Denotes player spent time with another team in the season. Stats reflect time with the Spurs only.

== Awards and records ==
- Alvin Robertson, NBA All-Defensive Second Team
- Willie Anderson, NBA All-Rookie Team 1st Team

== See also ==
- 1988-89 NBA season
