= 1988 NBA playoffs =

Postseason tournament

Tournament details
- Dates: April 28–June 21, 1988
- Season: 1987–88
- Teams: 16

Final positions
- Champions: Los Angeles Lakers (11th title)
- Runners-up: Detroit Pistons
- Semifinalists: Dallas Mavericks; Boston Celtics

Tournament statistics
- Scoring leader(s): James Worthy (Lakers) (21.1 PPG)

Awards
- MVP: James Worthy (Lakers)

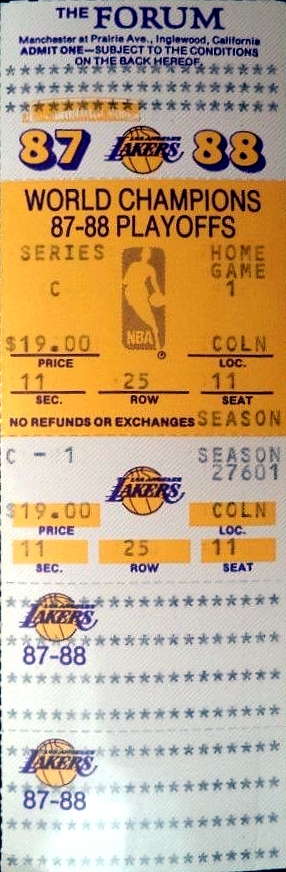
A ticket for Game 1 of the 1988 Western Conference Finals between the Los Angeles Lakers and the Dallas Mavericks.

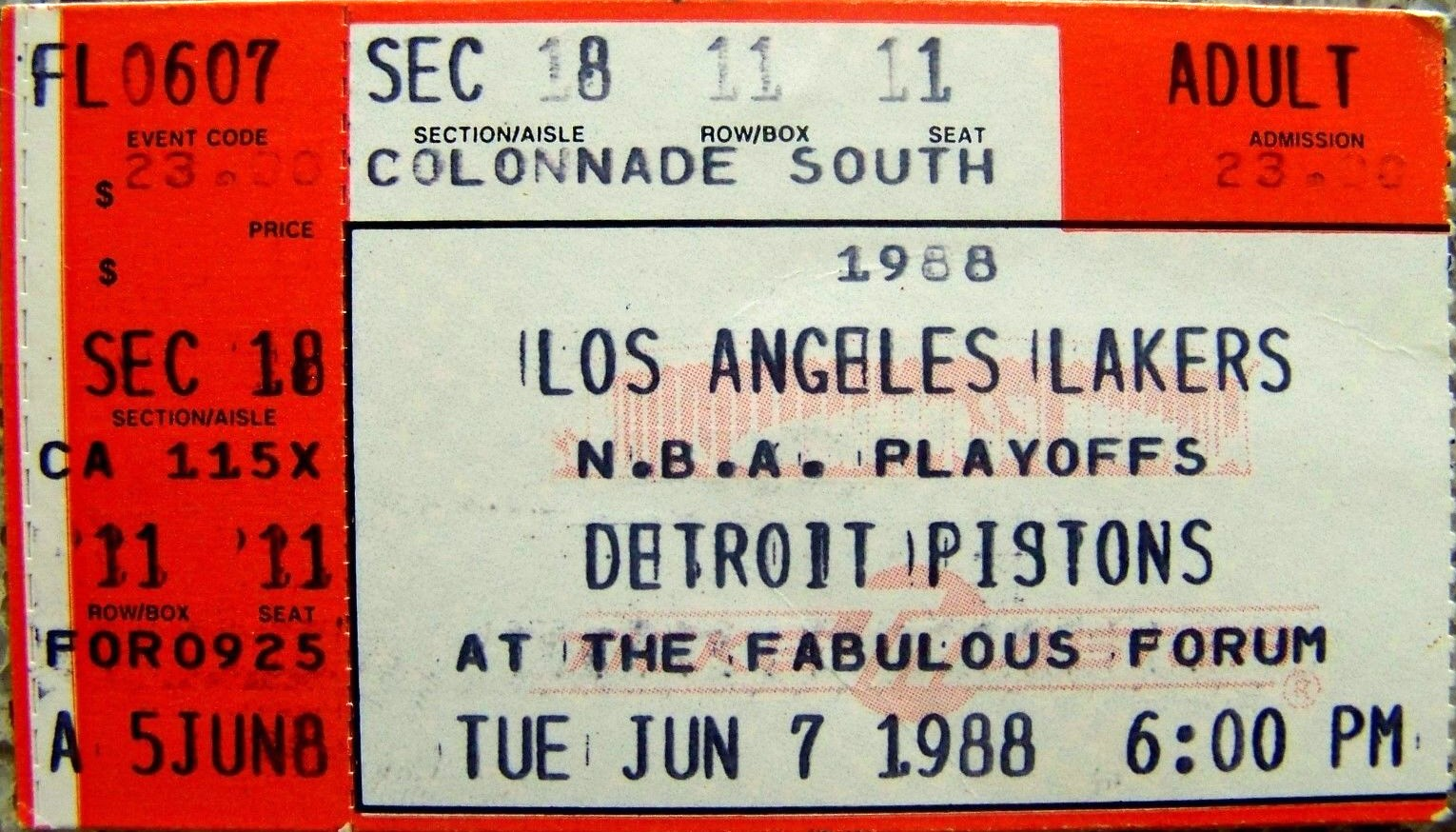
A ticket for Game 1 of the 1988 NBA Finals at The Forum.

The 1988 NBA playoffs was the postseason tournament of the National Basketball Association's 1987–88 season. The tournament concluded with the Western Conference champion Los Angeles Lakers defeating the Eastern Conference champion Detroit Pistons 4 games to 3 in the NBA Finals. James Worthy was named NBA Finals MVP. The Lakers became the first team since the Boston Celtics in 1969 to repeat as champions, a feat that coach Pat Riley guaranteed the previous offseason.

This marked the first time since 1983 that the Celtics did not represent the East in the NBA Finals, but they did win one of the most memorable games of the 1988 playoffs, beating the Hawks 118–116 in Game 7 of the Eastern Conference Semifinals in Boston Garden. Larry Bird scored 20 of his 34 points in the fourth quarter to help Boston overcome the 47 points scored by Dominique Wilkins.

The Dallas Mavericks made their first trip to the Western Conference Finals, losing in 7 to the Lakers. They would not advance that far again until 2003, and would not face the Lakers again until 2011.

The New York Knicks made the playoffs for the first time since 1984. They remained regulars until 2001, which included NBA Finals appearances in 1994 and 1999. On the other hand, the Washington Bullets did not return until 1997, and would not win a playoff game again until 2005 as the Wizards.

In the first round against the Cleveland Cavaliers, Michael Jordan scored 50 or more points twice—50 points in Game 1, and 55 points in Game 2—becoming the first player to do so in the same series.

This was the first time in NBA history that a game other than a Finals game was played during the month of June.

The San Antonio Spurs became the most recent team to qualify for the playoffs despite losing 50 or more games, as they finished with a 31–51 record. Since then, only the Boston Celtics in 1995 have qualified for the playoffs while winning only 35 or less games in an 82-game regular season. Due to subsequent expansion from 23 teams in 1988 to 30 in 2004, it is unlikely any team would make the playoffs while losing 50 or more games in a season.

Game 4 of the Atlanta-Milwaukee series was the last NBA game played at The MECCA. The next season, the Bucks moved to the Bradley Center, where they would play for the next thirty seasons.

Game 5 of the NBA Finals was the last NBA game ever played at the Pontiac Silverdome. The Pistons moved full-time to the Palace of Auburn Hills in the fall and would play there until moving to Little Caesars Arena in downtown Detroit in 2017.

This was the last NBA postseason to have back-to-backs in the conference finals (they would still occur in the conference semifinals until 2000).

These playoffs had four playoff series where the home team was undefeated in the series in a single year, an active NBA playoff record. Only 1990 has had more than two playoff series where the home team went undefeated in a single year.

== Bracket ==
First Round	Conference Semifinals
E1	Boston*	3
E8	New York	1
E1	Boston*	4
E4	Atlanta	3
E4	Atlanta	3
E5	Milwaukee	2
Eastern Conference
E3	Chicago	3
E6	Cleveland	2
E3	Chicago	1
E2	Detroit*	4
E2	Detroit*	3
E7	Washington	2
W1	LA Lakers*	3
W8	San Antonio	0
W1	LA Lakers*	4
W5	Utah	3
W4	Portland	1
W5	Utah	3
Western Conference
W3	Dallas	3
W6	Houston	1
W3	Dallas	4
W2	Denver*	2
W2	Denver*	3
W7	Seattle	2

Conference Finals
E1	Boston*	2
E2	Detroit*	4
W1	LA Lakers*	4
W3	Dallas	3

NBA Finals
E2	Detroit*	3
W1	LA Lakers*	4

- * Division winner
- Bold Series winner
- Italic Team with home-court advantage

== First round ==
=== Eastern Conference first round ===
==== (1) Boston Celtics vs. (8) New York Knicks ====
April 29

Boxscore

New York Knicks 92, Boston Celtics 112
Scoring by quarter: 29–26, 22–27, 24–29, 17–30
Pts: Gerald Wilkins 24; Rebs: Ewing, Green 11 each Asts: Mark Jackson 9	Pts: McHale, Bird 29 each Rebs: Robert Parish 13; Asts: Dennis Johnson 9
Boston leads series, 1–0

Boston Garden, Boston, Massachusetts
Attendance: 14,890
Referees: Earl Strom, Paul Mihalak

May 1

Boxscore

New York Knicks 102, Boston Celtics 128
Scoring by quarter: 25–29, 23–34, 24–28, 30–37
Pts: Gerald Wilkins 24; Rebs: Patrick Ewing 10; Asts: Mark Jackson 7	Pts: Larry Bird 36; Rebs: Kevin McHale 12; Asts: Dennis Johnson 9
Boston leads series, 2–0

Boston Garden, Boston, Massachusetts
Attendance: 14,890
Referees: Hue Hollins, Ed Rush

May 4

Boxscore

Boston Celtics 100, New York Knicks 109
Scoring by quarter: 21–22, 24–23, 25–28, 30–36
Pts: Kevin McHale 24; Rebs: Robert Parish 11; Asts: Larry Bird 12	Pts: Johnny Newman 34; Rebs: Patrick Ewing 10; Asts: Mark Jackson 14
Boston leads series, 2–1

Madison Square Garden, New York City, New York
Attendance: 19,591
Referees: Mike Mathis, Hugh Evans

May 6

Boxscore

Boston Celtics 102, New York Knicks 94
Scoring by quarter: 28–21, 24–25, 19–24, 31–24
Pts: Larry Bird 28; Rebs: Robert Parish 12; Asts: Dennis Johnson 12	Pts: Mark Jackson 28; Rebs: Patrick Ewing 20; Asts: Mark Jackson 9
Boston wins series, 3–1

Madison Square Garden, New York City, New York
Attendance: 19,591
Referees: Jess Kersey, Joe Crawford

Regular-season series
Boston won 5–1 in the regular-season series

November 9, 1987

Recap

Boston Celtics 96, New York Knicks 87

Madison Square Garden, New York City

November 18, 1987

Recap

New York Knicks 109, Boston Celtics 111 (2OT)

Boston Garden, Boston

January 6, 1988

Recap

New York Knicks 108, Boston Celtics 117

Boston Garden, Boston

January 9, 1988

Recap

Boston Celtics 98, New York Knicks 106

Madison Square Garden, New York City

February 22, 1988

Recap

New York Knicks 93, Boston Celtics 95

Hartford Civic Center, Hartford, Connecticut

March 26, 1988

Recap

Boston Celtics 118, New York Knicks 106

Madison Square Garden, New York City

This was the 12th playoff meeting between these two teams, with the Celtics winning six of the first 11 meetings.

Previous playoff series
Boston leads 6–5 in all-time playoff series

1951

Boston Celtics 0, New York Knicks 2

1951 Eastern Division Semifinals

1952

Boston Celtics 1, New York Knicks 2

1952 Eastern Division Semifinals

1953

Boston Celtics 1, New York Knicks 3

1953 Eastern Division Finals

1954

Boston Celtics 2, New York Knicks 0

1954 Eastern Division Round Robin Semifinals

1955

Boston Celtics 2, New York Knicks 1

1955 Eastern Division Semifinals

1967

Boston Celtics 3, New York Knicks 1

1967 Eastern Division Semifinals

1969

Boston Celtics 4, New York Knicks 2

1969 Eastern Division Finals

1972

Boston Celtics 1, New York Knicks 4

1972 Eastern Conference Finals

1973

Boston Celtics 3, New York Knicks 4

1973 Eastern Conference Finals

1974

Boston Celtics 4, New York Knicks 1

1974 Eastern Conference Finals

1984

Boston Celtics 4, New York Knicks 3

1984 Eastern Conference Semifinals

==== (2) Detroit Pistons vs. (7) Washington Bullets ====
April 28

Boxscore

Washington Bullets 87, Detroit Pistons 96
Scoring by quarter: 21–20, 21–18, 19–29, 26–29
Pts: Jeff Malone 33; Rebs: Moses Malone 13; Asts: John Williams 9	Pts: Isiah Thomas 34; Rebs: Bill Laimbeer 12; Asts: Joe Dumars 6
Detroit leads series, 1–0

Pontiac Silverdome, Pontiac, Michigan
Attendance: 17,356
Referees: Darell Garretson, Terry Durham

April 30

Boxscore

Washington Bullets 101, Detroit Pistons 102
Scoring by quarter: 23–28, 23–23, 36–25, 19–26
Pts: Jeff Malone 31; Rebs: Moses Malone 14; Asts: Jeff Malone 4	Pts: Isiah Thomas 30; Rebs: Bill Laimbeer 11; Asts: Joe Dumars 5
Detroit leads series, 2–0

Pontiac Silverdome, Pontiac, Michigan
Attendance: 18,293
Referees: Hugh Evans, Bruce Alexander

May 2

Boxscore

Detroit Pistons 106, Washington Bullets 114 (OT)
Scoring by quarter: 25–29, 26–23, 24–28, 23–18, Overtime: 8–16
Pts: Isiah Thomas 29; Rebs: Bill Laimbeer 8 Asts: Isiah Thomas 8	Pts: Jeff Malone 35; Rebs: Moses Malone 9 Asts: Steve Colter 6
Detroit leads series, 2–1

Capital Centre, Landover, Maryland
Attendance: 9,673
Referees: Jack Madden, Mike Mathis

May 4

Boxscore

Detroit Pistons 103, Washington Bullets 106
Scoring by quarter: 29–27, 21–26, 28–25, 25–28
Pts: Dantley, Rodman 23 each Rebs: Bill Laimbeer 10; Asts: Isiah Thomas 10	Pts: Jeff Malone 25; Rebs: Moses Malone 8 Asts: Darrell Walker 5
Series tied, 2–2

Capital Centre, Landover, Maryland
Attendance: 10,513
Referees: Earl Strom, Jess Kersey, Dick Bavetta

May 8

Boxscore

Washington Bullets 78, Detroit Pistons 99
Scoring by quarter: 22–27, 18–23, 20–23, 18–26
Pts: Bernard King 18; Rebs: Moses Malone 12; Asts: three players 3 each	Pts: Joe Dumars 20; Rebs: Bill Laimbeer 11; Asts: Isiah Thomas 11
Detroit wins series, 3–2

Pontiac Silverdome, Pontiac, Michigan
Attendance: 18,403
Referees: Jake O'Donnell, Ed Rush

Regular-season series
Detroit won 3–2 in the regular-season series

November 28, 1987

Recap

Detroit Pistons 102, Washington Bullets 124

Capital Centre, Landover, Maryland

December 11, 1987

Recap

Washington Bullets 108, Detroit Pistons 114

Pontiac Silverdome, Pontiac, Michigan

March 5, 1988

Recap

Detroit Pistons 97, Washington Bullets 101

Capital Centre, Landover, Maryland

March 20, 1988

Recap

Washington Bullets 110, Detroit Pistons 118

Pontiac Silverdome, Pontiac, Michigan

April 21, 1988

Recap

Detroit Pistons 99, Washington Bullets 87

Capital Centre, Landover, Maryland

This was the second playoff meeting between these two teams, with the Pistons winning the first meeting.

Previous playoff series
Detroit leads 1–0 in all-time playoff series

1987

Detroit Pistons 3, Washington Bullets 0

1987 Eastern Conference First Round

==== (3) Chicago Bulls vs. (6) Cleveland Cavaliers ====
April 28

Boxscore

Cleveland Cavaliers 93, Chicago Bulls 104
Scoring by quarter: 29–23, 19–30, 28–20, 17–31
Pts: Craig Ehlo 21; Rebs: Larry Nance 8 Asts: Mark Price 12	Pts: Michael Jordan 50; Rebs: Charles Oakley 15; Asts: John Paxson 7
Chicago leads series, 1–0

Chicago Stadium, Chicago, Illinois
Attendance: 18,676
Referees: Jack Madden, Hue Hollins, Bruce Alexander

May 1

Boxscore

Cleveland Cavaliers 101, Chicago Bulls 106
Scoring by quarter: 36–23, 19–28, 24–28, 22–27
Pts: Larry Nance 27; Rebs: Brad Daugherty 13; Asts: Larry Nance 8	Pts: Michael Jordan 55; Rebs: Charles Oakley 12; Asts: Sam Vincent 14
Chicago leads series, 2–0

Chicago Stadium, Chicago, Illinois
Attendance: 18,645
Referees: Darell Garretson, Paul Mihalak

May 3

Boxscore

Chicago Bulls 102, Cleveland Cavaliers 110
Scoring by quarter: 22–35, 28–24, 24–30, 28–21
Pts: Michael Jordan 38; Rebs: Charles Oakley 9 Asts: Michael Jordan 9	Pts: Mark Price 31; Rebs: Brad Daugherty 10; Asts: Mark Price 6
Chicago leads series, 2–1

Richfield Coliseum, Richfield, Ohio
Attendance: 20,068
Referees: Jess Kersey, Dick Bavetta

May 5

Boxscore

Chicago Bulls 91, Cleveland Cavaliers 97
Scoring by quarter: 19–27, 24–28, 25–21, 23–21
Pts: Michael Jordan 44; Rebs: Charles Oakley 10; Asts: Sam Vincent 5	Pts: Ron Harper 30; Rebs: Brad Daugherty 9 Asts: Mark Price 7
Series tied, 2–2

Richfield Coliseum, Richfield, Ohio
Attendance: 20,026
Referees: Joe Crawford, Mike Mathis

May 8

Boxscore

Cleveland Cavaliers 101, Chicago Bulls 107
Scoring by quarter: 35–23, 21–28, 21–29, 24–27
Pts: Mark Price 25; Rebs: Brad Daugherty 10; Asts: Mark Price 7	Pts: Michael Jordan 39; Rebs: Charles Oakley 20; Asts: Rory Sparrow 7
Chicago wins series, 3–2

Chicago Stadium, Chicago, Illinois
Attendance: 18,008
Referees: Hugh Evans, Earl Strom, Tommy Nunez (alternate)

Regular-season series
Tied 3–3 in the regular-season series

December 17, 1987

Recap

Cleveland Cavaliers 100, Chicago Bulls 111

Chicago Stadium, Chicago, Illinois

January 14, 1988

Recap

Chicago Bulls 88, Cleveland Cavaliers 91 (OT)

The Coliseum, Richfield, Ohio

February 21, 1988

Recap

Chicago Bulls 111, Cleveland Cavaliers 113

The Coliseum, Richfield, Ohio

March 15, 1988

Recap

Cleveland Cavaliers 89, Chicago Bulls 108

Chicago Stadium, Chicago, Illinois

March 25, 1988

Recap

Chicago Bulls 111, Cleveland Cavaliers 110 (OT)

The Coliseum, Richfield, Ohio

April 22, 1988

Recap

Cleveland Cavaliers 107, Chicago Bulls 103

Chicago Stadium, Chicago, Illinois

This was the first playoff meeting between the Bulls and the Cavaliers.

==== (4) Atlanta Hawks vs. (5) Milwaukee Bucks ====
April 29

Boxscore

Milwaukee Bucks 107, Atlanta Hawks 110
Scoring by quarter: 28–25, 32–23, 16–36, 31–26
Pts: Paul Pressey 21; Rebs: Jack Sikma 12; Asts: Paul Pressey 7	Pts: Dominique Wilkins 26; Rebs: Kevin Willis 9 Asts: Doc Rivers 6
Atlanta leads series, 1–0

Omni Coliseum, Atlanta, Georgia
Attendance: 11,517
Referees: Ed T. Rush, Hue Hollins, Terry Durham

May 1

Boxscore

Milwaukee Bucks 97, Atlanta Hawks 104
Scoring by quarter: 29–26, 25–28, 22–24, 21–26
Pts: Sidney Moncrief 22; Rebs: Jack Sikma 17; Asts: Paul Pressey 9	Pts: Dominique Wilkins 43; Rebs: Kevin Willis 10; Asts: Doc Rivers 8
Atlanta leads series, 2–0

Omni Coliseum, Atlanta, Georgia
Attendance: 11,777
Referees: Hugh Evans, Dick Bavetta

May 4

Boxscore

Atlanta Hawks 115, Milwaukee Bucks 123
Scoring by quarter: 29–31, 28–23, 27–35, 31–34
Pts: Dominique Wilkins 22; Rebs: Dominique Wilkins 14; Asts: Randy Wittman 8	Pts: Terry Cummings 30; Rebs: Jack Sikma 16; Asts: Paul Pressey 6
Atlanta leads series, 2–1

MECCA Arena, Milwaukee, Wisconsin
Attendance: 11,052
Referees: Bill Saar, Joe Crawford

May 6

Boxscore

Atlanta Hawks 99, Milwaukee Bucks 105
Scoring by quarter: 27–20, 20–28, 28–28, 24–29
Pts: Dominique Wilkins 31; Rebs: Kevin Willis 8 Asts: Doc Rivers 9	Pts: Terry Cummings 30; Rebs: Jack Sikma 9 Asts: Sidney Moncrief 7
Series tied, 2–2

MECCA Arena, Milwaukee, Wisconsin
Attendance: 11,052
Referees: Earl Strom, Bill Oakes

May 8

Boxscore

Milwaukee Bucks 111, Atlanta Hawks 121
Scoring by quarter: 22–26, 25–32, 23–31, 41–32
Pts: Terry Cummings 28; Rebs: Larry Krystkowiak 10; Asts: Moncrief, Pressey 6 each	Pts: Dominique Wilkins 33; Rebs: Dominique Wilkins 10; Asts: Doc Rivers 15
Atlanta wins series, 3–2

Omni Coliseum, Atlanta, Georgia
Attendance: 12,190
Referees: Darell Garretson, Jess Kersey

Regular-season series
Tied 3–3 in the regular-season series

November 15, 1987

Recap

Atlanta Hawks 103, Milwaukee Bucks 112

MECCA Arena, Milwaukee, Wisconsin

December 18, 1987

Recap

Atlanta Hawks 94, Milwaukee Bucks 87

MECCA Arena, Milwaukee, Wisconsin

March 5, 1988

Recap

Milwaukee Bucks 104, Atlanta Hawks 101

The Omni, Atlanta

March 21, 1988

Recap

Milwaukee Bucks 105, Atlanta Hawks 115

The Omni, Atlanta

March 22, 1988

Recap

Atlanta Hawks 98, Milwaukee Bucks 111

MECCA Arena, Milwaukee

April 5, 1988

Recap

Milwaukee Bucks 110, Atlanta Hawks 121

The Omni, Atlanta

This was the second playoff meeting between these two teams, with the Bucks winning the first meeting.

Previous playoff series
Milwaukee leads 1–0 in all-time playoff series

1984

Atlanta Hawks 2, Milwaukee Bucks 3

1984 Eastern Conference First Round

=== Western Conference first round ===
==== (1) Los Angeles Lakers vs. (8) San Antonio Spurs ====
April 29

Boxscore

San Antonio Spurs 110, Los Angeles Lakers 122
Scoring by quarter: 28–26, 21–34, 31–30, 30–32
Pts: Alvin Robertson 34; Rebs: Anderson, Berry 8 each Asts: Robertson, Brickowski 5 each	Pts: James Worthy 22; Rebs: Mychal Thompson 14; Asts: Magic Johnson 18
LA Lakers lead series, 1–0

The Forum, Inglewood, California
Attendance: 17,505
Referees: Jess Kersey, Mike Mathis, Blane Reichelt

May 1

Boxscore

San Antonio Spurs 112, Los Angeles Lakers 130
Scoring by quarter: 32–25, 26–35, 23–33, 31–37
Pts: Alvin Robertson 28; Rebs: Frank Brickowski 12; Asts: Alvin Robertson 12	Pts: Mychal Thompson 29; Rebs: Mychal Thompson 16; Asts: Magic Johnson 15
LA Lakers lead series, 2–0

The Forum, Inglewood, California
Attendance: 17,505
Referees: Jake O'Donnell, Jack Nies

May 3

Boxscore

Los Angeles Lakers 109, San Antonio Spurs 107
Scoring by quarter: 39–36, 28–29, 22–26, 20–16
Pts: Magic Johnson 25; Rebs: James Worthy 11; Asts: Magic Johnson 11	Pts: Frank Brickowski 27; Rebs: Greg Anderson 8 Asts: Alvin Robertson 11
LA Lakers win series, 3–0

HemisFair Arena, San Antonio, Texas
Attendance: 11,542
Referees: Ed T. Rush, Tommy Nunez Sr.

Regular-season series
Los Angeles won 5–0 in the regular-season series

November 10, 1987

Recap

Los Angeles Lakers 133, San Antonio Spurs 124

HemisFair Arena, San Antonio

November 15, 1987

Recap

San Antonio Spurs 130, Los Angeles Lakers 147

The Forum, Inglewood, California

January 4, 1988

Recap

San Antonio Spurs 115, Los Angeles Lakers 133

The Forum, Inglewood, California

February 12, 1988

Recap

Los Angeles Lakers 133, San Antonio Spurs 132

HemisFair Arena, San Antonio

April 19, 1988

Recap

Los Angeles Lakers 133, San Antonio Spurs 126

HemisFair Arena, San Antonio

This was the fourth playoff meeting between these two teams, with the Lakers winning the first three meetings.

Previous playoff series
Los Angeles leads 3–0 in all-time playoff series

1982

Los Angeles Lakers 4, San Antonio Spurs 0

1982 Western Conference Finals

1983

Los Angeles Lakers 4, San Antonio Spurs 2

1983 Western Conference Finals

1986

Los Angeles Lakers 3, San Antonio Spurs 0

1986 Western Conference First Round

==== (2) Denver Nuggets vs. (7) Seattle SuperSonics ====
April 29

Boxscore

Seattle SuperSonics 123, Denver Nuggets 126
Scoring by quarter: 27–28, 39–28, 28–28, 29–42
Pts: Tom Chambers 29; Rebs: Xavier McDaniel 10; Asts: McDaniel, McMillan 8 each	Pts: Alex English 28; Rebs: Fat Lever 11; Asts: Fat Lever 8
Denver leads series, 1–0

McNichols Sports Arena, Denver, Colorado
Attendance: 17,022
Referees: Jack Nies, Bill Oakes, Jake O'Donnell

May 1

Boxscore

Seattle SuperSonics 111, Denver Nuggets 91
Scoring by quarter: 34–22, 32–19, 25–23, 20–27
Pts: Dale Ellis 24; Rebs: Xavier McDaniel 17; Asts: Nate McMillan 6	Pts: English, Evans 16 each Rebs: Fat Lever 12; Asts: Michael Adams 5
Series tied, 1–1

McNichols Sports Arena, Denver, Colorado
Attendance: 17,022
Referees: Tommy Nunez Sr., Earl Strom

May 3

Boxscore

Denver Nuggets 124, Seattle SuperSonics 115
Scoring by quarter: 39–34, 24–24, 35–30, 27–26
Pts: Blair Rasmussen 28; Rebs: Blair Rasmussen 12; Asts: Adams, Lever 7 each	Pts: Tom Chambers 34; Rebs: Xavier McDaniel 12; Asts: Nate McMillan 9
Denver leads series, 2–1

Seattle Center Coliseum, Seattle, Washington
Attendance: 14,250
Referees: Darell Garretson, Paul Mihalak

May 5

Boxscore

Denver Nuggets 117, Seattle SuperSonics 127
Scoring by quarter: 36–35, 27–30, 30–32, 24–30
Pts: Jay Vincent 28; Rebs: Danny Schayes 8 Asts: English, Evans 5 each	Pts: Xavier McDaniel 27; Rebs: Derrick McKey 7 Asts: Danny Young 8
Series tied, 2–2

Seattle Center Coliseum, Seattle, Washington
Attendance: 14,250
Referees: Ed F. Rush, Hue Hollins

May 7

Boxscore

Seattle SuperSonics 96, Denver Nuggets 115
Scoring by quarter: 22–17, 26–37, 20–32, 28–29
Pts: Tom Chambers 23; Rebs: Alton Lister 8 Asts: Xavier McDaniel 5	Pts: Alex English 23; Rebs: Jay Vincent 7 Asts: Alex English 7
Denver wins series, 3–2

McNichols Sports Arena, Denver, Colorado
Attendance: 16,040
Referees: Jack Madden, Hugh Evans

Regular-season series
Denver won 4–1 in the regular-season series

December 26, 1987

Recap

Seattle SuperSonics 111, Denver Nuggets 115

McNichols Sports Arena, Denver, Colorado

December 28, 1987

Recap

Denver Nuggets 100, Seattle SuperSonics 108

Seattle Center Coliseum, Seattle

March 5, 1988

Recap

Denver Nuggets 115, Seattle SuperSonics 102

Seattle Center Coliseum, Seattle

March 20, 1988

Recap

Seattle SuperSonics 95, Denver Nuggets 108

McNichols Sports Arena, Denver, Colorado

April 19, 1988

Recap

Seattle SuperSonics 114, Denver Nuggets 134

McNichols Sports Arena, Denver, Colorado

This was the second playoff meeting between these two teams, with the SuperSonics winning the first meeting.

Previous playoff series
Seattle leads 1–0 in all-time playoff series

1978

Denver Nuggets 2, Seattle SuperSonics 4

1978 Western Conference Finals

==== (3) Dallas Mavericks vs. (6) Houston Rockets ====
April 28

Boxscore

Houston Rockets 110, Dallas Mavericks 120
Scoring by quarter: 29–29, 17–32, 27–16, 37–43
Pts: Hakeem Olajuwon 34; Rebs: Hakeem Olajuwon 14; Asts: Sleepy Floyd 11	Pts: Roy Tarpley 24; Rebs: Roy Tarpley 9 Asts: Derek Harper 8
Dallas leads series, 1–0

Reunion Arena, Dallas, Texas
Attendance: 17,007
Referees: Joe Crawford, Bill Saar

April 30

Boxscore

Houston Rockets 119, Dallas Mavericks 108
Scoring by quarter: 32–28, 28–34, 29–27, 30–19
Pts: Sleepy Floyd 42; Rebs: Hakeem Olajuwon 26; Asts: Sleepy Floyd 9	Pts: Roy Tarpley 23; Rebs: Roy Tarpley 13; Asts: Derek Harper 8
Series tied, 1–1

Reunion Arena, Dallas, Texas
Attendance: 17,007
Referees: Jack Madden, Dick Bavetta, Bennett Salvatore

May 3

Boxscore

Dallas Mavericks 93, Houston Rockets 92
Scoring by quarter: 25–23, 28–22, 20–32, 20–15
Pts: Roy Tarpley 17; Rebs: Roy Tarpley 13; Asts: Rolando Blackman 7	Pts: Hakeem Olajuwon 35; Rebs: Hakeem Olajuwon 12; Asts: Sleepy Floyd 5
Dallas leads series, 2–1

The Summit, Houston, Texas
Attendance: 16,611
Referees: Bruce Alexander, Earl Strom

May 5

Boxscore

Dallas Mavericks 107, Houston Rockets 97
Scoring by quarter: 14–23, 32–21, 37–32, 24–21
Pts: Mark Aguirre 38; Rebs: James Donaldson 10; Asts: Rolando Blackman 10	Pts: Hakeem Olajuwon 40; Rebs: Hakeem Olajuwon 15; Asts: Sleepy Floyd 9
Dallas wins series, 3–1

The Summit, Houston, Texas
Attendance: 16,611
Referees: Jake O'Donnell, Paul Mihalak

- Cedric Maxwell's final NBA game.

Regular-season series
Dallas won 4–2 in the regular-season series

December 26, 1987

Recap

Houston Rockets 100, Dallas Mavericks 105

Reunion Arena, Dallas

January 4, 1988

Recap

Dallas Mavericks 107, Houston Rockets 117

The Summit, Houston

January 30, 1988

Recap

Houston Rockets 108, Dallas Mavericks 92

Reunion Arena, Dallas

February 25, 1988

Recap

Dallas Mavericks 108, Houston Rockets 106

The Summit, Houston

March 4, 1988

Recap

Houston Rockets 110, Dallas Mavericks 118

Reunion Arena, Dallas

April 19, 1988

Recap

Dallas Mavericks 104, Houston Rockets 96

The Summit, Houston

This was the first playoff meeting between the Mavericks and the Rockets.

==== (4) Portland Trail Blazers vs. (5) Utah Jazz ====
April 28

Boxscore

Utah Jazz 96, Portland Trail Blazers 108
Scoring by quarter: 30–33, 18–27, 24–26, 24–22
Pts: Thurl Bailey 31; Rebs: Karl Malone 13; Asts: John Stockton 9	Pts: Clyde Drexler 26; Rebs: Clyde Drexler 13; Asts: Terry Porter 12
Portland leads series, 1–0

Memorial Coliseum, Portland, Oregon
Attendance: 12,666
Referees: Jess Kersey, Mike Mathis

April 30

Boxscore

Utah Jazz 114, Portland Trail Blazers 105
Scoring by quarter: 36–23, 22–30, 21–20, 35–32
Pts: Karl Malone 37; Rebs: Karl Malone 16; Asts: John Stockton 13	Pts: Clyde Drexler 25; Rebs: Maurice Lucas 14; Asts: Terry Porter 7
Series tied, 1–1

Memorial Coliseum, Portland, Oregon
Attendance: 12,666
Referees: Bill Saar, Joe Crawford

May 4

Boxscore

Portland Trail Blazers 108, Utah Jazz 113
Scoring by quarter: 17–25, 24–24, 34–32, 33–32
Pts: Jerome Kersey 23; Rebs: Kevin Duckworth 16; Asts: Drexler, Porter 4 each	Pts: Karl Malone 35; Rebs: Karl Malone 9 Asts: John Stockton 16
Utah leads series, 2–1

Salt Palace, Salt Lake City, Utah
Attendance: 12,444
Referees: Jake O'Donnell, Bill Oakes

May 6

Boxscore

Portland Trail Blazers 96, Utah Jazz 111
Scoring by quarter: 22–25, 31–26, 27–31, 16–29
Pts: Kevin Duckworth 33; Rebs: Kersey, Duckworth 10 each Asts: Clyde Drexler 6	Pts: Karl Malone 38; Rebs: Mark Eaton 11; Asts: John Stockton 10
Utah wins series, 3–1

Salt Palace, Salt Lake City, Utah
Attendance: 12,444
Referees: Darell Garretson, Hue Hollins

Regular-season series
Utah won 4–1 in the regular-season series

January 13, 1988

Recap

Portland Trail Blazers 104, Utah Jazz 116

Salt Palace, Salt Lake City

February 4, 1988

Recap

Utah Jazz 126, Portland Trail Blazers 123

Memorial Coliseum, Portland, Oregon

February 15, 1988

Recap

Portland Trail Blazers 94, Utah Jazz 112

Salt Palace, Salt Lake City

April 14, 1988

Recap

Portland Trail Blazers 128, Utah Jazz 123

Salt Palace, Salt Lake City

April 19, 1988

Recap

Utah Jazz 129, Portland Trail Blazers 122

Memorial Coliseum, Portland, Oregon

This was the first playoff meeting between the Trail Blazers and the Jazz.

== Conference semifinals ==
=== Eastern Conference semifinals ===
==== (1) Boston Celtics vs. (4) Atlanta Hawks ====
May 11

Boxscore

Atlanta Hawks 101, Boston Celtics 110
Scoring by quarter: 23–38, 25–16, 20–28, 33–28
Pts: Dominique Wilkins 25; Rebs: Doc Rivers 9 Asts: three players 5 each	Pts: Larry Bird 38; Rebs: Robert Parish 14; Asts: Danny Ainge 12
Boston leads series, 1–0

Boston Garden, Boston, Massachusetts
Attendance: 14,890
Referees: Jake O'Donnell, Dick Bavetta

May 13

Boxscore

Atlanta Hawks 97, Boston Celtics 108
Scoring by quarter: 9–25, 30–20, 32–30, 26–33
Pts: Dominique Wilkins 22; Rebs: Tree Rollins 9 Asts: Doc Rivers 6	Pts: Kevin McHale 32; Rebs: Robert Parish 14; Asts: Dennis Johnson 9
Boston leads series, 2–0

Boston Garden, Boston, Massachusetts
Attendance: 14,890
Referees: Jack Madden, Paul Mihalak

May 15

Boxscore

Boston Celtics 92, Atlanta Hawks 110
Scoring by quarter: 22–24, 23–28, 23–30, 24–28
Pts: Larry Bird 22; Rebs: Robert Parish 13; Asts: Larry Bird 8	Pts: Dominique Wilkins 25; Rebs: Kevin Willis 13; Asts: Spud Webb 13
Boston leads series, 2–1

Omni Coliseum, Atlanta, Georgia
Attendance: 16,451
Referees: Earl Strom, Mike Mathis

May 16

Boxscore

Boston Celtics 109, Atlanta Hawks 118
Scoring by quarter: 38–32, 21–34, 24–29, 26–23
Pts: Larry Bird 30; Rebs: Kevin McHale 12; Asts: Dennis Johnson 10	Pts: Dominique Wilkins 40; Rebs: Tree Rollins 12; Asts: Doc Rivers 22
Series tied, 2–2

Omni Coliseum, Atlanta, Georgia
Attendance: 16,451
Referees: Hugh Evans, Hue Hollins

May 18

Boxscore

Atlanta Hawks 112, Boston Celtics 104
Scoring by quarter: 23–24, 20–24, 26–29, 43–27
Pts: Kevin Willis 27; Rebs: Kevin Willis 14; Asts: Doc Rivers 7	Pts: Robert Parish 24; Rebs: Robert Parish 13; Asts: Dennis Johnson 10
Atlanta leads series, 3–2

Boston Garden, Boston, Massachusetts
Attendance: 14,890
Referees: Ed T. Rush, Jess Kersey

May 20

Boxscore

Boston Celtics 102, Atlanta Hawks 100
Scoring by quarter: 32–30, 26–27, 25–21, 19–22
Pts: Kevin McHale 26; Rebs: Larry Bird 11; Asts: Danny Ainge 14	Pts: Dominique Wilkins 35; Rebs: Willis, Rollins 11 each Asts: Spud Webb 7
Series tied, 3–3

Omni Coliseum, Atlanta, Georgia
Attendance: 16,451
Referees: Darell Garretson, Joe Crawford

May 22

Boxscore

Atlanta Hawks 116, Boston Celtics 118
Scoring by quarter: 30–28, 28–31, 24–25, 34–34
Pts: Dominique Wilkins 47; Rebs: Kevin Willis 11; Asts: Doc Rivers 18	Pts: Larry Bird 34; Rebs: Kevin McHale 13; Asts: Danny Ainge 10
Boston wins series, 4–3

Boston Garden, Boston, Massachusetts
Attendance: 14,890
Referees: Jake O'Donnell, Hugh Evans

Regular-season series
Boston won 4–2 in the regular-season series

November 25, 1987

Recap

Atlanta Hawks 102, Boston Celtics 117

Boston Garden, Boston

December 1, 1987

Recap

Boston Celtics 106, Atlanta Hawks 120

The Omni, Atlanta

January 22, 1988

Recap

Atlanta Hawks 106, Boston Celtics 124

Boston Garden, Boston

January 26, 1988

Recap

Boston Celtics 102, Atlanta Hawks 97

The Omni, Atlanta

March 13, 1988

Recap

Atlanta Hawks 100, Boston Celtics 117

Boston Garden, Boston

April 22, 1988

Recap

Boston Celtics 106, Atlanta Hawks 133

The Omni, Atlanta

This was the ninth playoff meeting between these two teams, with the Celtics winning seven of the first eight meetings.

Previous playoff series
Boston leads 7–1 in all-time playoff series

1957

Boston Celtics 4, St. Louis Hawks 3

1957 NBA Finals

1958

Boston Celtics 2, St. Louis Hawks 4

1958 NBA Finals

1960

Boston Celtics 4, St. Louis Hawks 3

1960 NBA Finals

1961

Boston Celtics 4, St. Louis Hawks 1

1961 NBA Finals

1972

Atlanta Hawks 2, Boston Celtics 4

1972 Eastern Conference Semifinals

1973

Atlanta Hawks 2, Boston Celtics 4

1973 Eastern Conference Semifinals

1983

Atlanta Hawks 1, Boston Celtics 2

1983 Eastern Conference First Round

1986

Atlanta Hawks 1, Boston Celtics 4

1986 Eastern Conference Semifinals

==== (2) Detroit Pistons vs. (3) Chicago Bulls ====
May 10

Boxscore

Chicago Bulls 82, Detroit Pistons 93
Scoring by quarter: 22–31, 24–25, 20–19, 16–18
Pts: Michael Jordan 29; Rebs: Charles Oakley 13; Asts: Michael Jordan 6	Pts: Adrian Dantley 23; Rebs: Bill Laimbeer 14; Asts: Isiah Thomas 8
Detroit leads series, 1–0

Pontiac Silverdome, Pontiac, Michigan
Attendance: 18,312
Referees: Darell Garretson, Hue Hollins

May 12

Boxscore

Chicago Bulls 105, Detroit Pistons 95
Scoring by quarter: 25–20, 30–20, 26–22, 24–33
Pts: Michael Jordan 36; Rebs: Charles Oakley 12; Asts: Vincent, Pippen 5 each	Pts: Isiah Thomas 25; Rebs: Bill Laimbeer 14; Asts: Isiah Thomas 13
Series tied, 1–1

Pontiac Silverdome, Pontiac, Michigan
Attendance: 20,281
Referees: Jess Kersey, Mike Mathis

May 14

Boxscore

Detroit Pistons 101, Chicago Bulls 79
Scoring by quarter: 27–15, 25–23, 21–20, 28–21
Pts: Vinnie Johnson 23; Rebs: Bill Laimbeer 10; Asts: Isiah Thomas 11	Pts: Michael Jordan 24; Rebs: Charles Oakley 12; Asts: Sam Vincent 6
Detroit leads series, 2–1

Chicago Stadium, Chicago, Illinois
Attendance: 18,676
Referees: Bill Saar, Earl Strom

May 15

Boxscore

Detroit Pistons 96, Chicago Bulls 77
Scoring by quarter: 25–19, 21–15, 25–21, 25–22
Pts: Adrian Dantley 24; Rebs: Bill Laimbeer 13; Asts: Isiah Thomas 11	Pts: Michael Jordan 23; Rebs: Charles Oakley 10; Asts: Michael Jordan 5
Detroit leads series, 3–1

Chicago Stadium, Chicago, Illinois
Attendance: 18,676
Referees: Paul Mihalak, Ed C. Rush

May 18

Boxscore

Chicago Bulls 95, Detroit Pistons 102
Scoring by quarter: 26–30, 22–23, 23–20, 24–29
Pts: Michael Jordan 25; Rebs: Charles Oakley 15; Asts: Jordan, Paxson 8 each	Pts: Isiah Thomas 25; Rebs: Bill Laimbeer 13; Asts: Isiah Thomas 9
Detroit wins series, 4–1

Pontiac Silverdome, Pontiac, Michigan
Attendance: 21,371
Referees: Jack Madden, Joe Crawford

Regular-season series
Detroit won 4–2 in the regular-season series

November 21, 1987

Recap

Detroit Pistons 144, Chicago Bulls 132 (OT)

Chicago Stadium, Chicago, Illinois

December 15, 1987

Recap

Chicago Bulls 123, Detroit Pistons 127 (OT)

Pontiac Silverdome, Pontiac, Michigan

January 16, 1988

Recap

Detroit Pistons 99, Chicago Bulls 115

Chicago Stadium, Chicago, Illinois

February 9, 1988

Recap

Detroit Pistons 89, Chicago Bulls 74

Chicago Stadium, Chicago, Illinois

February 13, 1988

Recap

Chicago Bulls 73, Detroit Pistons 82

Pontiac Silverdome, Pontiac, Michigan

April 3, 1988

Recap

Chicago Bulls 112, Detroit Pistons 110

Pontiac Silverdome, Pontiac, Michigan

This was the second playoff meeting between these two teams, with the Bulls winning the first meeting.

Previous playoff series
Chicago leads 1–0 in all-time playoff series

1974

Chicago Bulls 4, Detroit Pistons 3

1974 Western Conference Semifinals

=== Western Conference semifinals ===
==== (1) Los Angeles Lakers vs. (5) Utah Jazz ====
May 8

Boxscore

Utah Jazz 91, Los Angeles Lakers 110
Scoring by quarter: 8–24, 23–31, 31–30, 29–25
Pts: Karl Malone 29; Rebs: Thurl Bailey 8 Asts: John Stockton 16	Pts: James Worthy 23; Rebs: Kareem Abdul-Jabbar 10; Asts: Magic Johnson 9
LA Lakers lead series, 1–0

The Forum, Inglewood, California
Attendance: 17,505
Referees: Jack Madden, Paul Mihalak

May 10

Boxscore

Utah Jazz 101, Los Angeles Lakers 97
Scoring by quarter: 24–22, 30–21, 20–23, 27–31
Pts: Karl Malone 29; Rebs: Mark Eaton 12; Asts: John Stockton 13	Pts: Byron Scott 26; Rebs: Mychal Thompson 12; Asts: Magic Johnson 10
Series tied, 1–1

The Forum, Inglewood, California
Attendance: 17,505
Referees: Bruce Alexander, Joe Crawford

May 13

Boxscore

Los Angeles Lakers 89, Utah Jazz 96
Scoring by quarter: 23–31, 19–25, 27–25, 20–15
Pts: Byron Scott 29; Rebs: Mychal Thompson 12; Asts: Magic Johnson 6	Pts: Karl Malone 29; Rebs: Mark Eaton 14; Asts: John Stockton 12
Utah leads series, 2–1

Salt Palace, Salt Lake City, Utah
Attendance: 12,444
Referees: Ed T. Rush, Bill Oakes

May 15

Boxscore

Los Angeles Lakers 113, Utah Jazz 100
Scoring by quarter: 29–31, 24–23, 31–22, 29–24
Pts: James Worthy 29; Rebs: Kareem Abdul-Jabbar 11; Asts: Magic Johnson 9	Pts: Karl Malone 29; Rebs: Karl Malone 11; Asts: John Stockton 13
Series tied, 2–2

Salt Palace, Salt Lake City, Utah
Attendance: 12,444
Referees: Jake O'Donnell, Dick Bavetta

May 17

Boxscore

Utah Jazz 109, Los Angeles Lakers 111
Scoring by quarter: 32–37, 27–22, 19–27, 31–25
Pts: Thurl Bailey 28; Rebs: Karl Malone 16; Asts: John Stockton 24	Pts: James Worthy 27; Rebs: Mychal Thompson 11; Asts: Magic Johnson 13
LA Lakers lead series, 3–2

The Forum, Inglewood, California
Attendance: 17,505
Referees: Darell Garretson, Mike Mathis

- Michael Cooper hits the game-winner with 7 seconds left; John Stockton ties the NBA playoff record for 24 assists.

May 19

Boxscore

Los Angeles Lakers 80, Utah Jazz 108
Scoring by quarter: 13–31, 29–25, 18–25, 20–27
Pts: Byron Scott 16; Rebs: Mychal Thompson 9 Asts: Magic Johnson 9	Pts: Karl Malone 27; Rebs: Karl Malone 11; Asts: John Stockton 17
Series tied, 3–3

Salt Palace, Salt Lake City, Utah
Attendance: 12,444
Referees: Hugh Evans, Hue Hollins

May 21

Boxscore

Utah Jazz 98, Los Angeles Lakers 109
Scoring by quarter: 27–32, 24–25, 24–30, 23–22
Pts: Karl Malone 31; Rebs: Karl Malone 15; Asts: John Stockton 20	Pts: Byron Scott 29; Rebs: Magic Johnson 9 Asts: Magic Johnson 16
LA Lakers win series, 4–3

The Forum, Inglewood, California
Attendance: 17,505
Referees: Earl Strom, Jess Kersey

Regular-season series
Los Angeles won 4–1 in the regular-season series

December 26, 1987

Recap

Los Angeles Lakers 117, Utah Jazz 109

Salt Palace, Salt Lake City

January 26, 1988

Recap

Utah Jazz 100, Los Angeles Lakers 111

The Forum, Inglewood, California

February 26, 1988

Recap

Utah Jazz 105, Los Angeles Lakers 112

The Forum, Inglewood, California

March 29, 1988

Recap

Utah Jazz 111, Los Angeles Lakers 122

The Forum, Inglewood, California

April 2, 1988

Recap

Los Angeles Lakers 92, Utah Jazz 106

Salt Palace, Salt Lake City

This was the first playoff meeting between the Lakers and the Jazz.

==== (2) Denver Nuggets vs. (3) Dallas Mavericks ====
May 10

Boxscore

Dallas Mavericks 115, Denver Nuggets 126
Scoring by quarter: 32–34, 15–25, 28–35, 40–32
Pts: Mark Aguirre 26; Rebs: James Donaldson 13; Asts: Derek Harper 5	Pts: Fat Lever 30; Rebs: Fat Lever 11; Asts: Lever, English 8 each
Denver leads series, 1–0

McNichols Sports Arena, Denver, Colorado
Attendance: 17,022
Referees: Jess Kersey, Mike Mathis

May 12

Boxscore

Dallas Mavericks 112, Denver Nuggets 108
Scoring by quarter: 28–33, 22–18, 30–23, 32–34
Pts: Rolando Blackman 31; Rebs: James Donaldson 13; Asts: Derek Harper 8	Pts: Lever, English 22 each Rebs: Danny Schayes 12; Asts: Michael Adams 7
Series tied, 1–1

McNichols Sports Arena, Denver, Colorado
Attendance: 17,022
Referees: Bill Saar, Joe Crawford

May 14

Boxscore

Denver Nuggets 107, Dallas Mavericks 105
Scoring by quarter: 24–31, 29–30, 25–26, 29–18
Pts: Alex English 23; Rebs: Fat Lever 11; Asts: Fat Lever 12	Pts: Sam Perkins 17; Rebs: Roy Tarpley 15; Asts: Mark Aguirre 6
Denver leads series, 2–1

Reunion Arena, Dallas, Texas
Attendance: 17,007
Referees: Darell Garretson, Hue Hollins

May 15

Boxscore

Denver Nuggets 103, Dallas Mavericks 124
Scoring by quarter: 24–29, 24–34, 23–32, 32–29
Pts: Alex English 24; Rebs: Wayne Cooper 10; Asts: Michael Adams 9	Pts: Mark Aguirre 34; Rebs: Roy Tarpley 13; Asts: Derek Harper 10
Series tied, 2–2

Reunion Arena, Dallas, Texas
Attendance: 17,007
Referees: Hugh Evans, Bill Oakes

May 17

Boxscore

Dallas Mavericks 110, Denver Nuggets 106
Scoring by quarter: 25–23, 30–28, 23–27, 32–28
Pts: Mark Aguirre 25; Rebs: Roy Tarpley 16; Asts: Derek Harper 6	Pts: Danny Schayes 33; Rebs: Danny Schayes 13; Asts: Adams, English 6 each
Dallas leads series, 3–2

McNichols Sports Arena, Denver, Colorado
Attendance: 17,022
Referees: Jake O'Donnell, Dick Bavetta

May 19

Boxscore

Denver Nuggets 95, Dallas Mavericks 108
Scoring by quarter: 27–25, 26–33, 27–24, 15–26
Pts: Alex English 34; Rebs: Danny Schayes 9 Asts: Michael Adams 8	Pts: Perkins, Blackman 23 each Rebs: Roy Tarpley 19; Asts: Derek Harper 9
Dallas wins series, 4–2

Reunion Arena, Dallas, Texas
Attendance: 17,007
Referees: Earl Strom, Paul Mihalak, Bill Saar

Regular-season series
Tied 3–3 in the regular-season series

November 28, 1987

Recap

Dallas Mavericks 98, Denver Nuggets 106

McNichols Sports Arena, Denver, Colorado

December 5, 1987

Recap

Denver Nuggets 96, Dallas Mavericks 109

Reunion Arena, Dallas

February 3, 1988

Recap

Dallas Mavericks 105, Denver Nuggets 115

McNichols Sports Arena, Denver, Colorado

February 29, 1988

Recap

Denver Nuggets 96, Dallas Mavericks 123

Reunion Arena, Dallas

April 9, 1988

Recap

Denver Nuggets 109, Dallas Mavericks 135

Reunion Arena, Dallas

April 17, 1988

Recap

Dallas Mavericks 122, Denver Nuggets 133

McNichols Sports Arena, Denver, Colorado

This was the first playoff meeting between the Mavericks and the Nuggets.

== Conference finals ==
=== Eastern Conference finals ===
==== (1) Boston Celtics vs. (2) Detroit Pistons ====
May 25

Boxscore

Detroit Pistons 104, Boston Celtics 96
Scoring by quarter: 30–28, 22–25, 23–20, 29–23
Pts: Isiah Thomas 35; Rebs: Rick Mahorn 10; Asts: Isiah Thomas 12	Pts: Kevin McHale 31; Rebs: Robert Parish 13; Asts: Dennis Johnson 10
Detroit leads series, 1–0

Boston Garden, Boston, Massachusetts
Attendance: 14,890
Referees: Paul Mihalak, Earl Strom

May 26

Boxscore

Detroit Pistons 115, Boston Celtics 119 (2OT)
Scoring by quarter: 29–28, 17–25, 32–28, 24–21, Overtime: 7–7, 6–10
Pts: Isiah Thomas 24; Rebs: John Salley 12; Asts: Isiah Thomas 11	Pts: Robert Parish 26; Rebs: Larry Bird 12; Asts: Dennis Johnson 10
Series tied, 1–1

Boston Garden, Boston, Massachusetts
Attendance: 14,890
Referees: Jack Madden, Mike Mathis

- Adrian Dantley hits a game-tying free throw with 10 seconds left in regulation to force OT; Kevin McHale hits the game-tying 3 pointer with 5 seconds left in the first OT to force the second OT.

May 28

Boxscore

Boston Celtics 94, Detroit Pistons 98
Scoring by quarter: 29–29, 21–29, 21–26, 23–14
Pts: Kevin McHale 32; Rebs: Larry Bird 11; Asts: Larry Bird 8	Pts: Joe Dumars 29; Rebs: John Salley 9 Asts: Isiah Thomas 6
Detroit leads series, 2–1

Pontiac Silverdome, Pontiac, Michigan
Attendance: 26,481
Referees: Jess Kersey, Joe Crawford

May 30

Boxscore

Boston Celtics 79, Detroit Pistons 78
Scoring by quarter: 16–10, 30–26, 14–32, 19–10
Pts: Larry Bird 20; Rebs: Larry Bird 10; Asts: D. Johnson, Bird 6 each	Pts: Bill Laimbeer 29; Rebs: three players 8 each Asts: Isiah Thomas 7
Series tied, 2–2

Pontiac Silverdome, Pontiac, Michigan
Attendance: 26,625
Referees: Darell Garretson, Ed Rush

- Dennis Johnson hits a game-winning free throw with 8 seconds left.

June 1

Boxscore

Detroit Pistons 102, Boston Celtics 96 (OT)
Scoring by quarter: 26–29, 14–25, 25–16, 27–22, Overtime: 10–4
Pts: Isiah Thomas 35; Rebs: John Salley 9 Asts: Dumars, Thomas 5 each	Pts: Larry Bird 27; Rebs: Larry Bird 17; Asts: Dennis Johnson 8
Detroit leads series, 3–2

Boston Garden, Boston, Massachusetts
Attendance: 14,890
Referees: Jake O'Donnell, Hue Hollins

- Fred Roberts hits the game-tying jumper with 1:05 left in regulation to force OT.

June 3

Boxscore

Boston Celtics 90, Detroit Pistons 95
Scoring by quarter: 25–21, 21–27, 17–27, 27–20
Pts: Kevin McHale 33; Rebs: Larry Bird 14; Asts: Dennis Johnson 9	Pts: Vinnie Johnson 24; Rebs: Bill Laimbeer 9 Asts: Isiah Thomas 9
Detroit wins series, 4–2

Pontiac Silverdome, Pontiac, Michigan
Attendance: 38,912
Referees: Earl Strom, Hugh Evans

- Artis Gilmore's final NBA game.

Regular-season series
Tied 3–3 in the regular-season series

December 4, 1987

Recap

Boston Celtics 105, Detroit Pistons 128

Pontiac Silverdome, Pontiac, Michigan

January 13, 1988

Recap

Detroit Pistons 105, Boston Celtics 143

Boston Garden, Boston

January 29, 1988

Recap

Boston Celtics 108, Detroit Pistons 125

Pontiac Silverdome, Pontiac, Michigan

February 28, 1988

Recap

Boston Celtics 101, Detroit Pistons 106

Pontiac Silverdome, Pontiac, Michigan

April 1, 1988

Recap

Detroit Pistons 110, Boston Celtics 121

Boston Garden, Boston

April 19, 1988

Recap

Detroit Pistons 110, Boston Celtics 121

Boston Garden, Boston

This was the fourth playoff meeting between these two teams, with the Celtics winning the first three meetings.

Previous playoff series
Boston leads 3–0 in all-time playoff series

1968

Boston Celtics 4, Detroit Pistons 2

1968 Eastern Division Semifinals

1985

Boston Celtics 4, Detroit Pistons 2

1985 Eastern Conference Semifinals

1987

Boston Celtics 4, Detroit Pistons 3

1987 Eastern Conference Finals

=== Western Conference finals ===
==== (1) Los Angeles Lakers vs. (3) Dallas Mavericks ====
May 23

Boxscore

Dallas Mavericks 98, Los Angeles Lakers 113
Scoring by quarter: 28–33, 21–19, 20–28, 29–33
Pts: three players 18 each Rebs: Roy Tarpley 20; Asts: Derek Harper 7	Pts: James Worthy 28; Rebs: three players 6 each Asts: Magic Johnson 12
LA Lakers lead series, 1–0

The Forum, Inglewood, California
Attendance: 17,505
Referees: Jack Madden, Joe Crawford

May 25

Boxscore

Dallas Mavericks 101, Los Angeles Lakers 123
Scoring by quarter: 30–32, 18–27, 22–30, 31–34
Pts: Mark Aguirre 28; Rebs: Roy Tarpley 13; Asts: Derek Harper 8	Pts: Byron Scott 30; Rebs: Kareem Abdul-Jabbar 7 Asts: Magic Johnson 19
LA Lakers lead series, 2–0

The Forum, Inglewood, California
Attendance: 17,505
Referees: Ed T. Rush, Bill Oakes

May 27

Boxscore

Los Angeles Lakers 94, Dallas Mavericks 106
Scoring by quarter: 25–26, 26–26, 25–23, 18–31
Pts: James Worthy 19; Rebs: Magic Johnson 8 Asts: Magic Johnson 10	Pts: Mark Aguirre 23; Rebs: Roy Tarpley 20; Asts: Brad Davis 6
LA Lakers lead series, 2–1

Reunion Arena, Dallas, Texas
Attendance: 17,007
Referees: Darell Garretson, Hue Hollins

May 29

Boxscore

Los Angeles Lakers 104, Dallas Mavericks 118
Scoring by quarter: 25–23, 32–33, 26–33, 21–29
Pts: Magic Johnson 28; Rebs: A.C. Green 12; Asts: Magic Johnson 12	Pts: Derek Harper 35; Rebs: Roy Tarpley 13; Asts: Rolando Blackman 11
Series tied, 2–2

Reunion Arena, Dallas, Texas
Attendance: 17,007
Referees: Jake O'Donnell, Dick Bavetta

May 31

Boxscore

Dallas Mavericks 102, Los Angeles Lakers 119
Scoring by quarter: 27–33, 20–31, 24–28, 31–27
Pts: Mark Aguirre 31; Rebs: Roy Tarpley 11; Asts: Derek Harper 6	Pts: James Worthy 28; Rebs: A.C. Green 10; Asts: Magic Johnson 20
LA Lakers lead series, 3–2

The Forum, Inglewood, California
Attendance: 17,505
Referees: Hugh Evans, Earl Strom

June 2

Boxscore

Los Angeles Lakers 103, Dallas Mavericks 105
Scoring by quarter: 26–25, 24–28, 30–29, 23–23
Pts: Worthy, Scott 27; Rebs: James Worthy 11; Asts: Magic Johnson 12	Pts: Mark Aguirre 23; Rebs: Mark Aguirre 13; Asts: Derek Harper 10
Series tied, 3–3

Reunion Arena, Dallas, Texas
Attendance: 17,007
Referees: Jess Kersey, Ed T. Rush

June 4

Boxscore

Dallas Mavericks 102, Los Angeles Lakers 117
Scoring by quarter: 29–29, 24–25, 26–33, 23–30
Pts: Mark Aguirre 24; Rebs: James Donaldson 14; Asts: Derek Harper 11	Pts: James Worthy 28; Rebs: Magic Johnson 9 Asts: Magic Johnson 11
LA Lakers win series, 4–3

The Forum, Inglewood, California
Attendance: 17,505
Referees: Jake O'Donnell, Jack Madden

Regular-season series
Los Angeles won 4–1 in the regular-season series

November 20, 1987

Recap

Dallas Mavericks 116, Los Angeles Lakers 119

The Forum, Inglewood, California

January 6, 1988

Recap

Dallas Mavericks 89, Los Angeles Lakers 103

The Forum, Inglewood, California

March 6, 1988

Recap

Los Angeles Lakers 108, Dallas Mavericks 97

Reunion Arena, Dallas

March 12, 1988

Recap

Dallas Mavericks 110, Los Angeles Lakers 101

The Forum, Inglewood, California

April 20, 1988

Recap

Los Angeles Lakers 114, Dallas Mavericks 107

Reunion Arena, Dallas

This was the third playoff meeting between these two teams, with the Lakers winning the first two meetings.

Previous playoff series
Los Angeles leads 2–0 in all-time playoff series

1984

Dallas Mavericks 1, Los Angeles Lakers 4

1984 Western Conference Semifinals

1986

Dallas Mavericks 2, Los Angeles Lakers 4

1986 Western Conference Semifinals

== NBA Finals: (W1) Los Angeles Lakers vs. (E2) Detroit Pistons ==
June 7

Boxscore

Detroit Pistons 105, Los Angeles Lakers 93
Scoring by quarter: 22–21, 35–19, 23–28, 25–25
Pts: Adrian Dantley 34; Rebs: Bill Laimbeer 7 Asts: Isiah Thomas 12	Pts: Magic Johnson 28; Rebs: A.C. Green 12; Asts: Magic Johnson 10
Detroit leads series, 1–0

The Forum, Inglewood, California
Attendance: 17,505
Referees: Darell Garretson, Joe Crawford

June 9

Boxscore

Detroit Pistons 96, Los Angeles Lakers 108
Scoring by quarter: 20–25, 19–24, 30–27, 27–32
Pts: Adrian Dantley 19; Rebs: Laimbeer, Mahorn 9 each Asts: Thomas, Dumars 7 each	Pts: James Worthy 26; Rebs: A.C. Green 13; Asts: Magic Johnson 11
Series tied, 1–1

The Forum, Inglewood, California
Attendance: 17,505
Referees: Ed T. Rush, Jess Kersey

June 12

Boxscore

Los Angeles Lakers 99, Detroit Pistons 86
Scoring by quarter: 23–21, 24–25, 31–18, 21–22
Pts: James Worthy 24; Rebs: James Worthy 9 Asts: Magic Johnson 14	Pts: Isiah Thomas 28; Rebs: Dennis Rodman 12; Asts: Isiah Thomas 9
LA Lakers lead series, 2–1

Pontiac Silverdome, Pontiac, Michigan
Attendance: 39,188
Referees: Earl Strom, Hugh Evans

June 14

Boxscore

Los Angeles Lakers 86, Detroit Pistons 111
Scoring by quarter: 29–32, 22–26, 14–25, 21–28
Pts: Magic Johnson 23; Rebs: A.C. Green 10; Asts: Magic Johnson 6	Pts: Adrian Dantley 27; Rebs: Isiah Thomas 9 Asts: Isiah Thomas 12
Series tied, 2–2

Pontiac Silverdome, Pontiac, Michigan
Attendance: 34,297
Referees: Jake O'Donnell, Jack Madden

June 16

Boxscore

Los Angeles Lakers 94, Detroit Pistons 104
Scoring by quarter: 30–27, 20–32, 25–22, 19–23
Pts: Kareem Abdul-Jabbar 26; Rebs: three players 6 each Asts: Magic Johnson 17	Pts: Adrian Dantley 25; Rebs: Bill Laimbeer 11; Asts: Isiah Thomas 8
Detroit leads series, 3–2

Pontiac Silverdome, Pontiac, Michigan
Attendance: 41,732
Referees: Darell Garretson, Joe Crawford

June 19

Boxscore

Detroit Pistons 102, Los Angeles Lakers 103
Scoring by quarter: 26–20, 20–33, 35–26, 21–24
Pts: Isiah Thomas 43; Rebs: Bill Laimbeer 9 Asts: Joe Dumars 10	Pts: James Worthy 28; Rebs: A.C. Green 10; Asts: Magic Johnson 19
Series tied, 3–3

The Forum, Inglewood, California
Attendance: 17,505
Referees: Ed Rush, Hugh Evans

- Isiah Thomas scores a Finals record 25 points in the 3rd quarter, despite having a severely sprained ankle; Kareem Abdul-Jabbar hits the game-winning free throws with 14 seconds left.

June 21

Boxscore

Detroit Pistons 105, Los Angeles Lakers 108
Scoring by quarter: 23–21, 29–26, 21–36, 32–25
Pts: Joe Dumars 25; Rebs: John Salley 10; Asts: Isiah Thomas 7	Pts: James Worthy 36; Rebs: James Worthy 16; Asts: Magic Johnson 14
LA Lakers win series, 4–3

The Forum, Inglewood, California
Attendance: 17,505
Referees: Earl Strom, Jake O'Donnell

Regular-season series
Los Angeles won 2–0 in the regular-season series

January 8, 1988

Recap

Los Angeles Lakers 106, Detroit Pistons 104

Pontiac Silverdome, Pontiac, Michigan

February 21, 1988

Recap

Detroit Pistons 110, Los Angeles Lakers 117

The Forum, Inglewood, California

This was the tenth playoff meeting between these two teams, with the Lakers winning eight of the first nine meetings.

Previous playoff series
Los Angeles leads 8–1 in all-time playoff series

1950

Fort Wayne Pistons 0, Minneapolis Lakers 2

1950 Central Division Finals

1953

Fort Wayne Pistons 2, Minneapolis Lakers 3

1953 Western Division Finals

1954

Fort Wayne Pistons 0, Minneapolis Lakers 2

1954 Western Division Round Robin Semifinals

1955

Fort Wayne Pistons 3, Minneapolis Lakers 1

1955 Western Division Finals

1957

Fort Wayne Pistons 0, Minneapolis Lakers 2

1957 Western Division Semifinals

1959

Detroit Pistons 1, Minneapolis Lakers 2

1959 Western Division Semifinals

1960

Detroit Pistons 0, Minneapolis Lakers 2

1960 Western Division Semifinals

1961

Detroit Pistons 2, Los Angeles Lakers 3

1961 Western Division Semifinals

1962

Detroit Pistons 2, Los Angeles Lakers 4

1962 Western Division Finals

== Statistical leaders ==
Category	Game high			Average			
Category	Player	Team	High	Player	Team	Avg.	GP
Points	Michael Jordan	Chicago Bulls	55	Hakeem Olajuwon	Houston Rockets	37.5	4
Rebounds	Hakeem Olajuwon	Houston Rockets	26	Hakeem Olajuwon	Houston Rockets	16.8	4
Assists	John Stockton	Utah Jazz	24	John Stockton	Utah Jazz	14.8	11
Steals	Michael Jordan; Isiah Thomas; Horace Grant; Ron Harper; Patrick Ewing; Clyde Drexler; Alvin Robertson	Chicago Bulls; Detroit Pistons; Chicago Bulls; Cleveland Cavaliers; New York Knicks; Portland Trail Blazers; San Antonio Spurs	6	Alvin Robertson	San Antonio Spurs	4.0	3
Blocks	Mark Eaton	Utah Jazz	7	Patrick Ewing	New York Knicks	3.3	3
