= 1989 NBA Finals =

1989 basketball championship series

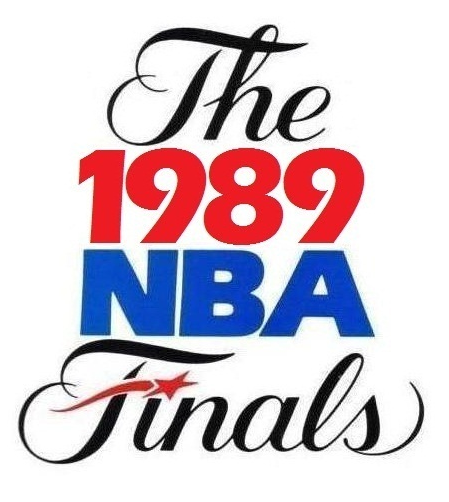
Team	Coach	Wins
Detroit Pistons	Chuck Daly	4
Los Angeles Lakers	Pat Riley	0
- Dates: June 6–13
- MVP: Joe Dumars (Detroit Pistons)
- Hall of Famers: Lakers: Kareem Abdul-Jabbar (1995); Michael Cooper (2024); Magic Johnson (2002); James Worthy (2003); Pistons: Joe Dumars (2006); Dennis Rodman (2011); Isiah Thomas (2000) Coaches: Chuck Daly (1994); Pat Riley (2008); Officials: Hugh Evans (2022); Darell Garretson (2016); Earl Strom (1995)
- Eastern finals: Pistons defeated Bulls, 4–2
- Western finals: Lakers defeated Suns, 4–0

The 1989 NBA Finals were the championship series of the National Basketball Association's (NBA) 1988–89 season and the conclusion of the season's playoffs. The series was a rematch of the previous year's championship round between the Eastern Conference champion Detroit Pistons and the two-time defending NBA champion and Western Conference champion Los Angeles Lakers.

This Finals series joined the 1983 NBA Finals as the only two championship series of the 1980s not won by either the Los Angeles Lakers or the Boston Celtics. Every finals series of the decade featured at least one of these two franchises, with the teams facing each other in 1984, 1985, and 1987. The Detroit Pistons' four-game victory marked the second time the Lakers were swept in the finals series during the decade, following their 4–0 loss to the Philadelphia 76ers in 1983.

During the season, the Lakers won the Western Conference, with Magic Johnson earning his second MVP award. The team swept its first three playoff series against Pacific Division rivals Portland, Seattle, and Phoenix, which resulted in a rematch with the Detroit Pistons in the Finals.

The Pistons dominated the Eastern Conference, winning 63 regular season games. After sweeping the Boston Celtics and the Milwaukee Bucks, the Detroit Pistons defeated the Chicago Bulls in six games, earning a second consecutive trip to the NBA Finals. In the previous season, the Lakers had defeated them in a tough seven-game series.

The Pistons won the series in a four-game sweep of the injury-riddled Lakers, capturing the first championship in franchise history and becoming the last of the NBA's "Original Eight" charter teams to win a championship.

It marked the first time that a team (the Lakers) had swept the first three rounds of the playoffs, only to be defeated in the Finals. As of 2026, the 1989 Pistons remain the most recent Eastern Conference team to sweep an NBA Finals series. The Pistons clinched all four playoff series on the road, a feat later matched by the 1999 San Antonio Spurs, the 2016 Cleveland Cavaliers, and the 2026 New York Knicks.

The Detroit Pistons' physical style of play and aggressive defensive schemes earned them the nickname "The Bad Boys". Although the name was originally popularized by NBA Entertainment in a 1987–88 season summary video, the team, led by Isiah Thomas and Bill Laimbeer, had embraced the title as a marketing brand and unifying identity. The "Bad Boys" image became a central part of the franchise's marketing during the 1988–89 championship run and remained an unofficial slogan during their repeat title season in 1990.

Following the series, Kareem Abdul-Jabbar announced his retirement from the NBA at age 42 at the end of his 20th season.

Pistons guard Joe Dumars was named NBA Finals Most Valuable Player.

== Background ==
=== Detroit Pistons ===
Before the season began, the Pistons moved from the Silverdome in Pontiac, Michigan, to the brand-new Palace of Auburn Hills, Michigan. The new arena was envisioned by Pistons owner William Davidson. It featured luxury boxes and club seating, which increased revenue compared with older arenas. The Pistons sold out all 41 games at The Palace.

The team itself also improved, highlighted by a mid-season trade that sent Adrian Dantley to the Dallas Mavericks in exchange for Mark Aguirre. With Aguirre taking over the starting small forward position, the Pistons went on a tear, winning 31 of their final 37 games to finish with a league-best 63–19 record.

Their second-half momentum carried over into the playoffs, sweeping both the Boston Celtics and the Milwaukee Bucks in the first two rounds. However, they lost two of the first three games to their archrival Chicago Bulls in the Conference Finals, but after devising the Jordan Rules scheme to contain Michael Jordan, the Pistons won the final three games to earn another Finals berth.

=== Los Angeles Lakers ===
Prior to the season, Kareem Abdul-Jabbar announced that the 1988–89 season was to be his last. Therefore, his 'retirement tour' consisted of pregame tributes in every arena to pay homage to the retiring Lakers captain.

Seeking to become the first team since the Boston Celtics dynasty of the 1960s to win three consecutive championships, the Lakers managed to put up a conference-best 57–25 record. The team's core remained mostly intact, save for veteran forward Kurt Rambis, who signed with the expansion Charlotte Hornets as a free agent. Their most notable addition was former Chicago Bulls forward Orlando Woolridge.

The Lakers became the first team to win their first 11 playoff games, as they swept the Portland Trail Blazers, Seattle SuperSonics and Phoenix Suns in each of the first three rounds. Magic Johnson won the MVP award that year.

=== Road to the Finals ===
Los Angeles Lakers (Western Conference champion)		Detroit Pistons (Eastern Conference champion)
# / Western Conference; # / Team / W / L / PCT / GB; 1 / c-Los Angeles Lakers / 57 / 25 / .695 / –; 2 / y-Utah Jazz / 51 / 31 / .622 / 6; 3 / x-Phoenix Suns / 55 / 27 / .671 / 2; 4 / x-Seattle SuperSonics / 47 / 35 / .573 / 10; 5 / x-Houston Rockets / 45 / 37 / .549 / 12; 6 / x-Denver Nuggets / 44 / 38 / .537 / 13; 7 / x-Golden State Warriors / 43 / 39 / .524 / 14; 8 / x-Portland Trail Blazers / 39 / 43 / .476 / 18; 9 / Dallas Mavericks / 38 / 44 / .463 / 19; 10 / Sacramento Kings / 27 / 55 / .329 / 30; 11 / San Antonio Spurs / 21 / 61 / .256 / 36; 12 / Los Angeles Clippers / 21 / 61 / .256 / 36; 13 / Miami Heat / 15 / 67 / .183 / 42; 1st seed in the West, 2nd best league record	Regular season	# / Eastern Conference; # / Team / W / L / PCT / GB; 1 / z-Detroit Pistons / 63 / 19 / .768 / –; 2 / y-New York Knicks / 52 / 30 / .634 / 11; 3 / x-Cleveland Cavaliers / 57 / 25 / .695 / 6; 4 / x-Atlanta Hawks / 52 / 30 / .634 / 11; 5 / x-Milwaukee Bucks / 49 / 33 / .598 / 14; 6 / x-Chicago Bulls / 47 / 35 / .573 / 16; 7 / x-Philadelphia 76ers / 46 / 36 / .561 / 17; 8 / x-Boston Celtics / 42 / 40 / .512 / 21; 9 / Washington Bullets / 40 / 42 / .488 / 23; 10 / Indiana Pacers / 28 / 54 / .341 / 35; 11 / New Jersey Nets / 26 / 56 / .317 / 37; 12 / Charlotte Hornets / 20 / 62 / .244 / 43; 1st seed in the East, best league record
Defeated the (8) Portland Trail Blazers, 3–0	First round	Defeated the (8) Boston Celtics, 3–0
Defeated the (4) Seattle SuperSonics, 4–0	Conference semi-finals	Defeated the (5) Milwaukee Bucks, 4–0
Defeated the (3) Phoenix Suns, 4–0	Conference finals	Defeated the (6) Chicago Bulls, 4–2

=== Regular season series ===
The Detroit Pistons won both games in the regular season series:

November 26, 1988

Los Angeles Lakers 99, Detroit Pistons 102

The Palace of Auburn Hills, Auburn Hills, Michigan

February 14, 1989

Detroit Pistons 111, Los Angeles Lakers 103

Great Western Forum, Inglewood, California

== Series summary ==
Game	Date	Road team	Result	Home team
Game 1	June 6	Los Angeles Lakers	97–109 (0–1)	Detroit Pistons
Game 2	June 8	Los Angeles Lakers	105–108 (0–2)	Detroit Pistons
Game 3	June 11	Detroit Pistons	114–110 (3–0)	Los Angeles Lakers
Game 4	June 13	Detroit Pistons	105–97 (4–0)	Los Angeles Lakers

== Game summaries ==
=== Game 1 ===
CBS, ABC, CTV, GMA

June 6
9:00 pm EDT

Los Angeles Lakers 97, Detroit Pistons 109
Scoring by quarter: 22–28, 26–27, 18–24, 31–30
Pts: Johnson, Worthy 17 each Rebs: A.C. Green 8 Asts: Magic Johnson 14	Pts: Isiah Thomas 24; Rebs: Aguirre, Rodman 10 each Asts: Isiah Thomas 9
Detroit leads series, 1–0

The Palace of Auburn Hills, Auburn Hills, Michigan
Attendance: 21,454
Referees:
- No. 11 Jake O'Donnell
- No. 20 Jess Kersey
- No. 14 Jack Madden

Before Game 1, Lakers guard Byron Scott suffered a severe hamstring injury in practice and did not play in the series.

For the Pistons, Thomas finished with 24 points, Dumars 22, and Johnson 19. With six minutes left, Detroit led 97–79, and the final score was 109–97.

=== Game 2 ===
CBS, ABC, CTV, GMA

June 8
9:00 pm EDT

Los Angeles Lakers 105, Detroit Pistons 108
Scoring by quarter: 32–26, 30–30, 30–28, 13–24
Pts: Cooper, Worthy 19 each Rebs: A.C. Green 9 Asts: Magic Johnson 9	Pts: Joe Dumars 33; Rebs: Mark Aguirre 6 Asts: Isiah Thomas 7
Detroit leads series, 2–0

The Palace of Auburn Hills, Auburn Hills, Michigan
Attendance: 21,454
Referees:
- No. 10 Darell Garretson
- No. 42 Hue Hollins
- No. 17 Joe Crawford

Joe Dumars had a strong first half with 24 points (finishing with 33). Los Angeles held a 62–56 lead at halftime.

With about four minutes left in the third period, John Salley blocked a Mychal Thompson shot, starting a Detroit fast break during which Magic Johnson pulled his hamstring. Magic was visibly hurt and frustrated, and had to be coaxed into leaving the floor. Dick Stockton, commentating for CBS, said, "I've never seen him (Magic) look like that", referring to the injury.

The final score was 108–105, and the Pistons took a 2–0 series lead.

=== Game 3 ===
CBS, ABC, CTV, GMA

June 11
3:30 pm EDT

Detroit Pistons 114, Los Angeles Lakers 110
Scoring by quarter: 27–22, 30–33, 29–33, 28–22
Pts: Joe Dumars 31; Rebs: Dennis Rodman 19; Asts: Isiah Thomas 8	Pts: James Worthy 26; Rebs: Kareem Abdul-Jabbar 13; Asts: Michael Cooper 13
Detroit leads the series, 3–0

Great Western Forum, Inglewood, California
Attendance: 17,505
Referees:
- No. 4 Ed T. Rush
- No. 13 Mike Mathis
- No. 25 Hugh Evans

Magic Johnson missed most of Game 3 due to injury, exiting after five minutes with the Lakers leading, 11–8.

James Worthy scored 26 points, and the 42-year-old Kareem Abdul-Jabbar had a strong game with 24 points and 13 rebounds. Michael Cooper had 13 assists and 15 points.

Dennis Rodman, despite having back spasms, had 19 rebounds. Joe Dumars scored 31 points, scoring 17 consecutive points in the third quarter. Vinnie Johnson scored 17, 13 of which came in the fourth. Isiah Thomas had 26 points and eight assists.

=== Game 4 ===
CBS, ABC, CTV, GMA

June 13
9:00 pm EDT

Detroit Pistons 105, Los Angeles Lakers 97
Scoring by quarter: 23–35, 26–20, 27–23, 29–19
Pts: Joe Dumars 23; Rebs: Johnson, Laimbeer 6 each Asts: Dumars, Johnson, Thomas 5 each	Pts: James Worthy 40; Rebs: A.C. Green 12; Asts: Michael Cooper 9
Detroit wins the series, 4–0

Great Western Forum, Inglewood, California
Attendance: 17,505
Referees:
- No. 20 Jess Kersey
- No. 14 Jack Madden
- No. 12 Earl Strom

James Worthy scored 40 points on 17-of-26 field-goal shooting. As a Pistons win would mark Kareem Abdul-Jabbar's final game, Kareem received several ovations during pregame warmups and introductions.

The Lakers led 35–23 at the end of the first quarter and led 55–49 at halftime. The Lakers led 78–76 lead at the end of the third quarter. The Pistons won 105–97. Dumars was named Finals MVP after averaging 27.3 points per game during the series.

The Pistons won the series 4–0, capturing their first NBA championship. This was the first NBA Finals that ended in a four-game sweep since the Finals went to the 2–3–2 format in 1985.

== Team rosters ==
=== Detroit Pistons ===
1988–89 Detroit Pistons roster
Players

Pos.	No.	Player	Height	Weight	DOB	From
SF	23	Mark Aguirre	6 ft 6 in (1.98 m)	232 lb (105 kg)	1959–12–10	DePaul
SF	34	Fennis Dembo	6 ft 5 in (1.96 m)	215 lb (98 kg)	1966–01–24	Wyoming
SG	4	Joe Dumars	6 ft 3 in (1.91 m)	190 lb (86 kg)	1963–05–24	McNeese State
C	53	James Edwards	7 ft 0 in (2.13 m)	225 lb (102 kg)	1955–11–22	Washington
PG	15	Vinnie Johnson	6 ft 2 in (1.88 m)	200 lb (91 kg)	1956–09–01	Baylor
C	40	Bill Laimbeer	6 ft 11 in (2.11 m)	245 lb (111 kg)	1957–05–19	Notre Dame
G/F	25	John Long	6 ft 5 in (1.96 m)	195 lb (88 kg)	1956–08–28	Detroit Mercy
F/C	44	Rick Mahorn	6 ft 10 in (2.08 m)	240 lb (109 kg)	1958–09–21	Hampton
SF	10	Dennis Rodman	6 ft 8 in (2.03 m)	210 lb (95 kg)	1961–05–13	SE Oklahoma State
PF	22	John Salley	6 ft 11 in (2.11 m)	230 lb (104 kg)	1964–05–16	Georgia Tech
PG	11	Isiah Thomas	6 ft 1 in (1.85 m)	180 lb (82 kg)	1961–04–30	Indiana
PG	24	Micheal Williams	6 ft 2 in (1.88 m)	175 lb (79 kg)	1966–07–23	Baylor

Coaches
Head coach
- Chuck Daly
Assistant(s)
- Brendan Malone
- Brendan Suhr

Legend
- (DP) Unsigned draft pick
- (FA) Free agent
- (S) Suspended
- Injured

=== Los Angeles Lakers ===
1988–89 Los Angeles Lakers roster
Players

Pos.	No.	Player	Height	Weight	DOB	From
C	33	Kareem Abdul-Jabbar	7 ft 2 in (2.18 m)	225 lb (102 kg)	1947–04–16	UCLA
G/F	19	Tony Campbell	6 ft 7 in (2.01 m)	215 lb (98 kg)	1962–05–17	Ohio State
G/F	21	Michael Cooper	6 ft 5 in (1.96 m)	170 lb (77 kg)	1956–04–15	New Mexico
PF	45	A.C. Green	6 ft 9 in (2.06 m)	220 lb (100 kg)	1963–10–04	Oregon State
PG	32	Magic Johnson	6 ft 9 in (2.06 m)	215 lb (98 kg)	1959–08–14	Michigan State
G/F	3	Jeff Lamp	6 ft 6 in (1.98 m)	195 lb (88 kg)	1959–03–09	Virginia
C	31	Mark McNamara	6 ft 11 in (2.11 m)	235 lb (107 kg)	1959–06–08	Santa Clara
PG	14	David Rivers	6 ft 0 in (1.83 m)	170 lb (77 kg)	1965–01–20	Notre Dame
SG	4	Byron Scott	6 ft 3 in (1.91 m)	195 lb (88 kg)	1961–03–28	Arizona State
C	43	Mychal Thompson	6 ft 10 in (2.08 m)	226 lb (103 kg)	1955–01–30	Minnesota
SF	0	Orlando Woolridge	6 ft 9 in (2.06 m)	215 lb (98 kg)	1959–12–16	Notre Dame
SF	42	James Worthy	6 ft 9 in (2.06 m)	225 lb (102 kg)	1961–02–27	North Carolina

Coaches
Head coach
- Pat Riley
Assistant(s)
- Bill Bertka
- Randy Pfund

Legend
- (DP) Unsigned draft pick
- (FA) Free agent
- (S) Suspended
- Injured

== Player statistics ==
Legend
GP	Games played	GS	Games started	MPG	Minutes per game
FG%	Field-goal percentage	3P%	3-point field-goal percentage	FT%	Free-throw percentage
RPG	Rebounds per game	APG	Assists per game	SPG	Steals per game
BPG	Blocks per game	PPG	Points per game

Detroit Pistons

Detroit Pistons statistics
Player	GP	GS	MPG	FG%	3P%	FT%	RPG	APG	SPG	BPG	PPG
Mark Aguirre	4	4	26.8	.364	.000	.750	6.0	1.5	0.5	0.0	7.5
Fennis Dembo	1	0	2.0	.000	.000	0.0	0.0	0.0	0.0	0.0	0.0
Joe Dumars	4	4	36.8	.576	.000	.868	1.8	6.0	0.5	0.3	27.3
James Edwards	4	0	24.3	.444	0.0	.750	3.5	0.8	0.0	0.8	9.0
Vinnie Johnson	4	0	23.8	.600	.200	.636	3.3	2.8	0.0	0.3	17.0
Bill Laimbeer	4	4	23.5	.545	.667	.857	5.3	2.3	0.5	0.0	8.0
John Long	1	0	2.0	1.000	.000	.000	0.0	0.0	0.0	0.0	2.0
Rick Mahorn	4	4	24.5	.556	.000	.667	5.3	1.0	0.3	0.8	6.0
Dennis Rodman	4	0	23.5	.467	.000	.857	10.0	1.3	0.5	0.3	5.0
John Salley	4	0	20.3	.684	.000	.571	2.5	1.3	0.3	2.8	7.5
Isiah Thomas	4	4	35.3	.485	.333	.760	2.5	7.3	1.5	0.3	21.3
Micheal Williams	1	0	2.0	.000	.000	0.0	0.0	1.0	0.0	0.0	0.0

Los Angeles Lakers

Los Angeles Lakers statistics
Player	GP	GS	MPG	FG%	3P%	FT%	RPG	APG	SPG	BPG	PPG
Kareem Abdul-Jabbar	4	4	26.0	.435	.000	.833	5.0	1.8	0.5	0.8	12.5
Tony Campbell	4	1	20.8	.625	.333	.765	2.5	1.0	0.8	0.0	11.0
Michael Cooper	4	4	40.8	.378	.333	.833	1.5	6.8	1.8	0.5	12.0
A.C. Green	4	4	33.5	.440	.000	.684	9.3	0.5	1.0	0.3	8.8
Magic Johnson	3	3	25.0	.462	.200	.909	3.7	8.0	1.0	0.0	11.7
Jeff Lamp	4	0	2.8	.667	.000	.500	0.3	0.0	0.0	0.0	1.3
Mark McNamara	2	0	2.0	.000	.000	0.0	0.0	0.0	0.0	0.0	0.0
David Rivers	3	0	8.7	.333	.000	.800	1.0	1.7	0.0	0.0	4.0
Mychal Thompson	4	0	25.8	.433	.000	.636	4.8	0.8	0.3	0.5	10.0
Orlando Woolridge	4	0	21.8	.611	.000	.842	5.3	1.5	0.0	0.5	9.5
James Worthy	4	4	42.5	.481	.667	.710	4.3	3.5	0.5	1.5	25.5

== Television coverage ==
This series was aired on CBS. Dick Stockton and Hubie Brown called the action. Stockton also narrated the season-ending documentary "Motor City Madness" for NBA Entertainment.

That year, Pat O'Brien filled in for Brent Musburger for Game 2 as pre-game, half-time and post-game host as Musburger was on assignment for CBS Sports, the same thing that happened in 1988. CBS used three sideline reporters which were O'Brien (the Pistons' sideline), Lesley Visser (the Lakers' sideline) and James Brown (both teams). This was Musburger's last NBA Finals assignment for CBS, as he was fired on April 1, 1990, months before NBA's television contract with CBS expired. Musburger moved to ABC and ESPN, and later called nine NBA Finals series for ESPN Radio between 1996 and 2004.

For the start of 1989 NBA Finals CBS completely revamped their opening montage for their NBA broadcasts. The computer-generated imagery (once again set in and around a virtual arena) was made to look more realistic (live-action footage was incorporated in the backdrops). Also, the familiar theme music (an uptempo series of four notes and three bars composed by Allyson Bellink since the 1983 NBA Finals) each was rearranged to sound more intricate and to have a more emotional impact, along the lines of the network's later World Series coverage. Between the 1989 NBA Finals and the 1990 NBA Finals' intros, the theme music was slightly revised; the 1989 Finals intro incorporated more of a guitar riff, while the 1990 Finals intro featured a little more usage of trumpets.

=== International ===
Country	Network
Argentina	ATC
Australia	ABC
Brazil	Band, Canal+
Canada	CTV, TSN
Europe	Screensport, Sky Channel
France	Canal+
Hong Kong	ATV (World • Home)
Japan	Nippon Television
Latin America	ESPN
Philippines	GMA Network, FEN Philippines
Spain	TV3
United Kingdom	BBC, Sky Channel

== Aftermath ==
The Pistons would repeat as champions in the next year, knocking off the Clyde Drexler-led Portland Trail Blazers in five games. They did so with virtually the same, minus Rick Mahorn, who was left unprotected and therefore selected in the 1989 expansion draft by the Minnesota Timberwolves. The Pistons were conducting their victory celebration in Detroit while the draft was happening and Mahorn was taken aside during the festivities, so he could be told. Pistons general manager Jack McCloskey tried to reacquire Mahorn to no avail, and years later Mahorn was shown to still be bothered by what transpired as the story of the expansion draft brought him to tears during the 2014 ESPN’s 30 for 30 documentary about the team.

This was Pat Riley’s last Finals appearance as the Lakers’ head coach. The next season, he resigned and became, after a brief stint as a broadcaster with NBC, the head coach of the New York Knicks from 1992 to 1995. The Lakers did make it back to the finals in 1991 in spite of Riley's absence, but fell to Michael Jordan and his Chicago Bulls in five games.

A decade later, Dennis Rodman and John Salley would play for the Lakers. Salley won a championship during the last year of his career with the Lakers in 2000.

The Pistons and Lakers met again in the 2004 NBA Finals. In the rematch, the Pistons, led by Ben Wallace, Chauncey Billups, Richard Hamilton, Rasheed Wallace and Tayshaun Prince, and coached by Larry Brown, beat the Lakers team of Kobe Bryant, Shaquille O'Neal, Karl Malone and Gary Payton, and coached by Phil Jackson, in five games.

This was the first NBA Finals to feature special on-court decals made for the event. These were placed within the center court of each participating team's home arenas. The NBA continued to place these decals until 2014.
