= 1988–89 Detroit Pistons season =

- NBA champions
- Conference champions
- Division champions
- Head coach: Chuck Daly
- General manager: Jack McCloskey
- Owner: William Davidson
- Arena: The Palace of Auburn Hills

Results
- Record: 63–19 (.768)
- Place: Division: 1st (Central); Conference: 1st (Eastern)
- Playoff finish: NBA champions (Defeated Lakers 4–0)
- Stats at Basketball Reference

Local media
- Television: WKBD-TV (George Blaha, Dick Motta); PASS Sports (Fred McLeod, Tom Wilson)
- Radio: WWJ (George Blaha, Dick Motta)

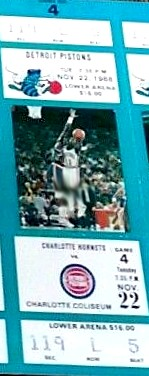
A ticket for a November 1988 game between the Pistons and the Charlotte Hornets.

The 1988–89 Detroit Pistons season was the 41st season for the Detroit Pistons in the National Basketball Association, and their 32nd season in Detroit, Michigan.

== Season summary ==
=== Off-season ===
Before the start of the regular season, the Pistons moved from the Pontiac Silverdome to their brand-new arena known as The Palace of Auburn Hills.

=== Regular season ===
The Pistons got off to a fast start by winning their first eight games of the regular season. The team got off to a 16–4 start to the season, and later on held a 31–13 record at the All-Star break. However, Adrian Dantley was unhappy with his role on the team, losing playing time to Dennis Rodman at the small forward position. At mid-season, the Pistons traded Dantley to the Dallas Mavericks in exchange for All-Star forward Mark Aguirre, a childhood friend of Isiah Thomas; Dantley felt that Thomas had a major role in engineering the trade, so that Aguirre could have the opportunity of winning a championship, an accusation that Thomas denied. Before the trade, Dantley averaged 18.4 points per game in 42 games. With the addition of Aguirre, the Pistons posted a nine-game winning streak in March, posted an eight-game winning streak between March and April, and then won their final five games of the season, finishing in first place in the Central Division with a league-best 63–19 record, and earning the first seed in the Eastern Conference. The team qualified for the NBA playoffs for the sixth consecutive year.

Thomas averaged 18.2 points, 8.3 assists and 1.7 steals per game, while Joe Dumars averaged 17.2 points and 5.7 assists per game, and Aguirre provided the team with 15.5 points per game in 36 games after the trade. In addition, Vinnie Johnson contributed 13.8 points and 3.0 assists per game off the bench, while Bill Laimbeer provided with 13.7 points and 9.6 rebounds per game, and Rodman averaged 9.0 points and 9.4 rebounds per game off the bench. Meanwhile, Rick Mahorn averaged 7.3 points and 6.9 rebounds per game, while also off the bench, James Edwards contributed 7.3 points per game, and John Salley provided with 7.0 points and 5.0 rebounds per game.

During the NBA All-Star weekend at the Houston Astrodome in Houston, Texas, Thomas was selected for the 1989 NBA All-Star Game, as a member of the Eastern Conference All-Star team. Thomas scored 19 points along with 14 assists and 4 steals, despite the Eastern Conference losing to the Western Conference, 143–134. Dumars and Rodman were both named to the NBA All-Defensive First Team; Thomas and Dumars both finished tied in 17th place in Most Valuable Player voting, while Rodman finished in third place in Defensive Player of the Year voting, finished in third place in Sixth Man of the Year voting, and also tied in seventh place in Most Improved Player voting, and head coach Chuck Daly finished in fourth place in Coach of the Year voting.

The Pistons finished second in the NBA in home-game attendance behind the expansion Charlotte Hornets, with an attendance of 879,405 at The Palace of Auburn Hills during the regular season.

=== NBA playoffs ===
In the Eastern Conference First Round of the 1989 NBA playoffs, and for the third consecutive year, the Pistons faced off against the 8th–seeded Boston Celtics, a team that featured the trio of All-Star forward Kevin McHale, All-Star center Robert Parish, and second-year star Reggie Lewis. The Celtics were without All-Star forward Larry Bird, who was out due to a season-ending heel injury. The Pistons won the first two games over the Celtics at home at The Palace of Auburn Hills, before winning Game 3 on the road, 100–85 at the Boston Garden to win the series in a three-game sweep.

In the Eastern Conference Semi-finals, the team faced off against the 5th–seeded Milwaukee Bucks, a team that featured All-Star forward Terry Cummings, sixth man Ricky Pierce, and Jack Sikma. The Pistons won the first two games over the Bucks at The Palace of Auburn Hills, and then won the next two games on the road, including a Game 4 win over the Bucks at the Bradley Center, 96–94 to win the series in a four-game sweep.

In the Eastern Conference Finals, and for the second consecutive year, the Pistons faced off against the 6th–seeded Chicago Bulls, who were led by All-Star guard Michael Jordan, and second-year stars, Scottie Pippen and Horace Grant. The Pistons lost Game 1 to the Bulls at The Palace of Auburn Hills, 94–88, but managed to win Game 2 at home, 100–91 to even the series. However, the Pistons lost Game 3 to the Bulls on the road, 99–97 at the Chicago Stadium, as the Bulls took a 2–1 series lead. The Pistons managed to win the next three games, including a Game 6 win over the Bulls at the Chicago Stadium, 103–94 to win the series in six games, and advance to the NBA Finals for the second consecutive year.

In the 1989 NBA Finals, the Pistons once again faced off against the top–seeded, and 2-time defending NBA champion Los Angeles Lakers, a team that featured the quartet of All-Star guard, and Most Valuable Player of the Year, Magic Johnson, All-Star forward James Worthy, Byron Scott, and All-Star center Kareem Abdul-Jabbar. Due to injuries to Magic Johnson and Scott, the Pistons won the first two games over the Lakers at The Palace of Auburn Hills, taking a 2–0 series lead, and then won the next two games on the road, including a Game 4 win over the Lakers at the Great Western Forum, 105–97. The Pistons won the series over the Lakers in a four-game sweep to win their first ever NBA championship, becoming the last of the NBA's original eight charter teams to win a championship. Dumars, who scored 23 points in Game 4, was named the NBA Finals Most Valuable Player.

The series was a rematch from last year's NBA Finals, with the Pistons avenging their NBA Finals loss. The Pistons clinched every series victory on the road that was later followed by the 1999 San Antonio Spurs, and the 2016 Cleveland Cavaliers.

=== Aftermath ===
Following the season, Mahorn was left unprotected in the 1989 NBA expansion draft, where he was selected by the Minnesota Timberwolves expansion team; however, Mahorn would never play for the Timberwolves due to a contract dispute, and was later on traded to the Philadelphia 76ers.

The Pistons and Lakers would face each other again 15 years later in the NBA Finals in 2004, where the Pistons would win in five games en route to their third NBA championship, despite being underdogs to the heavily favored Lakers.

== Draft picks ==
Round	Pick	Player	Position	Nationality	College
2	30	Fennis Dembo	Forward	United States	Wyoming
2	48	Micheal Williams	Guard	United States	Baylor

== Roster ==
1988–89 Detroit Pistons roster
Players

Pos.	No.	Player	Height	Weight	DOB	From
SF	23	Mark Aguirre	6 ft 6 in (1.98 m)	232 lb (105 kg)	1959–12–10	DePaul
SF	34	Fennis Dembo	6 ft 5 in (1.96 m)	215 lb (98 kg)	1966–01–24	Wyoming
SG	4	Joe Dumars	6 ft 3 in (1.91 m)	190 lb (86 kg)	1963–05–24	McNeese State
C	53	James Edwards	7 ft 0 in (2.13 m)	225 lb (102 kg)	1955–11–22	Washington
SG	15	Vinnie Johnson	6 ft 2 in (1.88 m)	200 lb (91 kg)	1956–09–01	Baylor
C	40	Bill Laimbeer	6 ft 11 in (2.11 m)	245 lb (111 kg)	1957–05–19	Notre Dame
SG	25	John Long	6 ft 5 in (1.96 m)	195 lb (88 kg)	1956–08–28	Detroit Mercy
PF	44	Rick Mahorn	6 ft 10 in (2.08 m)	240 lb (109 kg)	1958–09–21	Hampton
SF	10	Dennis Rodman	6 ft 7 in (2.01 m)	220 lb (100 kg)	1961–05–13	SE Oklahoma State
PF	22	John Salley	6 ft 11 in (2.11 m)	230 lb (104 kg)	1964–05–16	Georgia Tech
PG	11	Isiah Thomas	6 ft 1 in (1.85 m)	180 lb (82 kg)	1961–04–30	Indiana
PG	24	Micheal Williams	6 ft 2 in (1.88 m)	175 lb (79 kg)	1966–07–23	Baylor

Coaches
Head coach
- Chuck Daly
Assistant(s)
- Brendan Malone
- Dick Versace (until 1/5/1989)
- Brendan Suhr (hired 1/5/1989)

Legend
- (DP) Unsigned draft pick
- (FA) Free agent
- (S) Suspended
- Injured

== Regular season ==
On February 15, 1989, the Pistons traded Adrian Dantley to the Dallas Mavericks for Mark Aguirre. Dantley was unhappy relegating the leadership role on the Pistons to Isiah Thomas, while Aguirre had clashed with his coaches and teammates in Dallas. Aguirre was more amenable to deferring to Thomas, and accepted his role in Chuck Daly's system. His ability to shoot the three, post up, run the floor, and pass was instrumental in the growth of the team.

=== Season standings ===
Central Division	W	L	PCT	GB	Home	Road	Div
y-Detroit Pistons	63	19	.768	–	37–4	26–15	20–10
x-Cleveland Cavaliers	57	25	.695	6	37–4	20–21	19–11
x-Atlanta Hawks	52	30	.634	11	33–8	19–22	20–10
x-Milwaukee Bucks	49	33	.598	14	31–10	18–23	11–19
x-Chicago Bulls	47	35	.573	16	30–11	17–24	12–18
Indiana Pacers	28	54	.341	35	20–21	8–33	8–22

#	Eastern Conference				
#	Team	W	L	PCT	GB
1	z-Detroit Pistons	63	19	.768	–
2	y-New York Knicks	52	30	.634	11
3	x-Cleveland Cavaliers	57	25	.695	6
4	x-Atlanta Hawks	52	30	.634	11
5	x-Milwaukee Bucks	49	33	.598	14
6	x-Chicago Bulls	47	35	.573	16
7	x-Philadelphia 76ers	46	36	.561	17
8	x-Boston Celtics	42	40	.512	21
9	Washington Bullets	40	42	.488	23
10	Indiana Pacers	28	54	.341	35
11	New Jersey Nets	26	56	.317	37
12	Charlotte Hornets	20	62	.244	43

== Game log ==
=== Regular season ===
1988–89 game log
Total: 63–19 (Home: 37–4; Road: 26–15)
November: 11–3 (home: 4–1; road: 7–2)

Game	Date	Team	Score	High points	High rebounds	High assists	Location Attendance	Record
1	November 4; 8:30 p.m. EST	@ Chicago	W 107–94	Dantley (22)	Mahorn (10)	Thomas (14)	Chicago Stadium; 18,420	1–0
2	November 5; 7:30 p.m. EST	Charlotte	W 94–85	Dantley (18)	Laimbeer (12)	Dumars, Thomas (7)	The Palace of Auburn Hills; 21,454	2–0
3	November 8; 7:30 p.m. EST	@ Philadelphia	W 116–109	Dumars (30)	Laimbeer (11)	Dumars, Thomas (9)	The Spectrum; 10,115	3–0
4	November 9; 7:30 p.m. EST	Atlanta	W 101–95	Thomas (21)	Laimbeer (13)	Thomas (12)	The Palace of Auburn Hills; 21,454	4–0
5	November 11; 8:00 p.m. EST	@ Boston	W 116–107	Dantley (31)	Mahorn (6)	Thomas (10)	Boston Garden; 14,890	5–0
6	November 15; 8:30 p.m. EST	@ Dallas	W 108–99	Laimbeer (23)	Laimbeer (21)	Thomas (12)	Reunion Arena; 17,007	6–0
7	November 16; 8:30 p.m. EST	@ San Antonio	W 94–88	Dumars (20)	Mahorn (10)	Thomas (8)	HemisFair Arena; 11,991	7–0
8	November 18; 9:30 p.m. EST	@ Phoenix	W 121–105	Dumars (31)	Rodman (12)	Thomas (11)	Arizona Veterans Memorial Coliseum; 14,471	8–0
9	November 19; 8:30 p.m. EST	@ Houston	L 98–109	Thomas (26)	Rodman (12)	Thomas (6)	The Summit; 16,611	8–1
10	November 22; 7:30 p.m. EST	@ Charlotte	W 99–93	Dumars (26)	Mahorn (10)	Thomas (8)	Charlotte Coliseum; 23,389	9–1
11	November 23; 7:30 p.m. EST	New York	L 111–133	Dantley (25)	Laimbeer, Rodman (9)	Thomas (11)	The Palace of Auburn Hills; 21,454	9–2
12	November 26; 8:30 p.m. EST	L.A. Lakers	W 102–99	Dumars (20)	Mahorn (11)	Thomas (10)	The Palace of Auburn Hills; 21,454	10–2
13	November 29; 7:30 p.m. EST	@ Indiana	L 98–107	Laimbeer (22)	Laimbeer (10)	Thomas (12)	Market Square Arena; 10,275	10–3
14	November 30; 7:30 p.m. EST	Indiana	W 114–111	Thomas (36)	Laimbeer (9)	Thomas (9)	The Palace of Auburn Hills; 21,454	11–3

December: 9–4 (home: 6–1; road: 3–3)

Game	Date	Team	Score	High points	High rebounds	High assists	Location Attendance	Record
15	December 2; 8:00 p.m. EST	@ Washington	W 120–114	Dantley (28)	Mahorn (8)	Thomas (10)	Capital Centre; 12,606	12–3
16	December 4; 7:30 p.m. EST	@ New Jersey	W 102–99	Dantley (21)	Mahorn (12)	Thomas (8)	Brendan Byrne Arena; 12,517	13–3
17	December 6; 8:30 p.m. EST	@ Milwaukee	L 84–109	Dantley (17)	Laimbeer (6)	Laimbeer (6)	Bradley Center; 15,619	13–4
18	December 7; 7:30 p.m. EST	Chicago	W 102–89	Dantley (31)	Laimbeer (12)	Thomas (13)	The Palace of Auburn Hills; 21,454	14–4
19	December 9; 8:00 p.m. EST	@ Atlanta	W 92–82	Dumars (24)	Laimbeer, Rodman, Salley (8)	Dumars (6)	The Omni; 16,374	15–4
20	December 10; 7:30 p.m. EST	Philadelphia	W 106–100	Thomas (37)	Laimbeer (15)	Laimbeer (7)	The Palace of Auburn Hills; 21,454	16–4
21	December 14; 7:30 p.m. EST	Milwaukee	L 110–119	Dantley (22)	Laimbeer (12)	Thomas (12)	The Palace of Auburn Hills; 21,454	16–5
22	December 15; 7:30 p.m. EST	@ Cleveland	L 98–119	Dumars (16)	Rodman (10)	Williams (7)	Richfield Coliseum; 18,718	16–6
23	December 17; 7:30 p.m. EST	Charlotte	W 100–91	Thomas (25)	Mahorn (12)	Thomas (7)	The Palace of Auburn Hills; 21,454	17–6
24	December 20; 7:30 p.m. EST	Miami	W 116–100	Johnson (22)	Rodman (9)	Thomas (9)	The Palace of Auburn Hills; 21,454	18–6
25	December 22; 7:30 p.m. EST	@ New York	L 85–88	Johnson (19)	Mahorn (14)	Yhomas (7)	Madison Square Garden; 19,591	18–7
26	December 28; 7:30 p.m. EST	Phoenix	W 106–100	Dantley (24)	Rodman (14)	Dumars (9)	The Palace of Auburn Hills; 21,454	19–7
27	December 30; 8:00 p.m. EST	Houston	W 95–83	Dumars (28)	Laimbeer, Mahorn (13)	Dantley, Laimbeer, Thomas (5)	The Palace of Auburn Hills; 21,454	20–7

January: 8–6 (home: 7–2; road: 1–4)

Game	Date	Team	Score	High points	High rebounds	High assists	Location Attendance	Record
28	January 3; 7:30 p.m. EST	@ Atlanta	L 104–123	Thomas (28)	Rodman (8)	Thomas (6)	The Omni; 16,371	20–8
29	January 6; 8:00 p.m. EST	Atlanta	W 111–88	Laimbeer, Thomas (19)	Laimbeer (10)	Thomas (12)	The Palace of Auburn Hills; 21,454	21–8
30	January 7; 7:30 p.m. EST	@ Indiana	L 99–113	Thomas (31)	Rodman (12)	Thomas (8)	Market Square Arena; 16,105	21–9
31	January 11; 7:30 p.m. EST	New York	L 93–100	Laimbeer (21)	Rodman (10)	Thomas (9)	The Palace of Auburn Hills; 21,454	21–10
32	January 13; 8:00 p.m. EST	Washington	W 119–103	Dantley (35)	Laimbeer (14)	Thomas (8)	The Palace of Auburn Hills; 21,454	22–10
33	January 15; 2:30 p.m. EST	@ Milwaukee	L 112–120	Thomas (25)	Laimbeer (10)	Thomas (13)	Bradley Center; 18,633	22–11
34	January 16; 7:30 p.m. EST	Boston	W 96–87	Johnson (21)	Laimbeer (12)	Thomas (10)	The Palace of Auburn Hills; 21,454	23–11
35	January 18; 7:30 p.m. EST	New Jersey	W 103–90	Dantley (24)	Rodman (16)	Johnson, Thomas (6)	The Palace of Auburn Hills; 21,454	24–11
36	January 20; 8:00 p.m. EST	Indiana	W 132–99	Laimbeer (27)	Laimbeer, Rodman (11)	Thomas (12)	The Palace of Auburn Hills; 21,454	25–11
37	January 22; 12 Noon EST	@ Boston	L 99–112	Thomas (26)	Salley (11)	Salley, Thomas (5)	Boston Garden; 14,890	25–12
38	January 25; 7:30 p.m. EST	Golden State	W 105–104	Thomas (27)	Rodman (16)	Thomas (8)	The Palace of Auburn Hills; 21,454	26–12
39	January 27; 8:00 p.m. EST	Cleveland	L 79–80	Johnson, Thomas (22)	Rodman (17)	Thomas (5)	The Palace of Auburn Hills; 21,454	26–13
40	January 29; 7:00 p.m. EST	Sacramento	W 122–97	Rodman (24)	Rodman (16)	Thomas (15)	The Palace of Auburn Hills; 21,454	27–13
41	January 31; 8:00 p.m. EST	@ Chicago	W 104–98 (OT)	Thomas (34)	Rodman (14)	Dantley (8)	Chicago Stadium; 18,288	28–13

February: 8–3 (home: 4–0; road: 4–3)

Game	Date	Team	Score	High points	High rebounds	High assists	Location Attendance	Record
42	February 3; 8:00 p.m. EST	@ Philadelphia	W 124–106	Dantley (33)	Laimbeer, Salley, Thomas (7)	Thomas (7)	The Spectrum; 15,268	29–13
43	February 5; 2:00 p.m. EST	Chicago	W 113–102	Johnson (27)	Rodman (13)	Thomas (9)	The Palace of Auburn Hills; 21,454	30–13
44	February 8; 7:30 p.m. EST	Milwaukee	W 107–96	Laimbeer (22)	Rodman (12)	Thomas (14)	The Palace of Auburn Hills; 21,454	31–13
All-Star Break
45	February 14; 10:30 p.m. EST	@ L.A. Lakers	W 111–103	Dumars, Thomas (23)	Rodman (15)	Thomas (15)	Great Western Forum; 17,505	32–13
46	February 16; 10:30 p.m. EST	@ Sacramento	W 95–84	Dumars, Johnson, Laimbeer (20)	Rodman (15)	Thomas (14)	ARCO Arena; 16,517	33–13
47	February 18; 10:00 p.m. EST	@ Golden State	L 119–121 (OT)	Laimbeer, Rodman (32)	Rodman (21)	Thomas (13)	Oakland–Alameda County Coliseum Arena; 15,025	33–14
48	February 20; 4:00 p.m. EST	@ Denver	L 101–103	Johnson (21)	Laimbeer (16)	Thomas (10)	McNichols Sports Arena; 17,022	33–15
49	February 22; 7:30 p.m. EST	Portland	W 105–94	Dumars (19)	Rodman (15)	Thomas (12)	The Palace of Auburn Hills; 21,454	34–15
50	February 25; 7:30 p.m. EST	@ New Jersey	W 113–95	Aguirre (31)	Mahorn (9)	Dumars (10)	Brendan Byrne Arena; 20,049	35–15
51	February 26; 7:00 p.m. EST	L.A. Clippers	W 110–98	Thomas (21)	Rodman (13)	Thomas (11)	The Palace of Auburn Hills; 21,454	36–15
52	February 28; 8:00 p.m. EST	@ Cleveland	L 99–115	Aguirre, Thomas (28)	Rodman (11)	Thomas (13)	Richfield Coliseum; 20,246	36–16

March: 16–1 (home: 9–0; road: 7–1)

Game	Date	Team	Score	High points	High rebounds	High assists	Location Attendance	Record
53	March 1; 7:30 p.m. EST	Utah	W 96–85	Johnson (34)	Laimbeer (13)	Dumars (7)	The Palace of Auburn Hills; 21,454	37–16
54	March 3; 8:00 p.m. EST	Cleveland	W 96–90	Laimbeer (24)	Laimbeer (14)	Thomas (11)	The Palace of Auburn Hills; 21,454	38–16
55	March 5; 7:30 p.m. EST	@ Miami	W 109–100	Johnson, Thomas (22)	Rodman (10)	Thomas (8)	Miami Arena; 15,008	39–16
56	March 6; 7:30 p.m. EST	Denver	W 129–116	Dumars (25)	Mahorn (19)	Thomas (9)	The Palace of Auburn Hills; 21,454	40–16
57	March 8; 7:30 p.m. EST	Seattle	W 112–96	Thomas (27)	Laimbeer (19)	Thomas (12)	The Palace of Auburn Hills; 21,454	41–16
58	March 11; 7:30 p.m. EST	@ Philadelphia	W 111–106	Thomas (34)	Laimbeer (16)	Thomas (8)	The Spectrum; 17,678	42–16
59	March 12; 7:00 p.m. EST	Washington	W 110–104	Laimbeer (24)	Laimbeer (16)	Thomas (8)	The Palace of Auburn Hills; 21,454	43–16
60	March 14; 7:30 p.m. EST	@ Indiana	W 129–117	Dumars (30)	Johnson (7)	Dumars (8)	Market Square Arena; 12,031	44–16
61	March 17; 8:00 p.m. EST	Boston	W 106–98	Johnson (30)	Laimbeer, Rodman (10)	Dumars (7)	The Palace of Auburn Hills; 21,454	45–16
62	March 18; 9:00 p.m. EST	@ Milwaukee	L 100–117	Aguirre, Johnson (14)	Rodman (13)	Dumars (9)	Bradley Center; 18,633	45–17
63	March 21; 8:00 p.m. EST	@ Atlanta	W 110–95	Thomas (26)	Laimbeer (12)	Dumars (9)	The Omni; 16,371	46–17
64	March 22; 7:30 p.m. EST	San Antonio	W 115–94	Laimbeer (21)	Laimbeer (10)	Thomas (10)	The Palace of Auburn Hills; 21,454	47–17
65	March 24; 8:00 p.m. EST	New Jersey	W 112–96	Dumars (35)	Aguirre (11)	Thomas (11)	The Palace of Auburn Hills; 21,454	48–17
66	March 25; 7:30 p.m. EST	@ Charlotte	W 113–101	Dumars (18)	Laimbeer (11)	Thomas (6)	Charlotte Coliseum; 23,388	49–17
67	March 27; 7:30 p.m. EST	Dallas	W 90–77	Thomas (30)	Laimbeer, Rodman (11)	Dumars (6)	The Palace of Auburn Hills; 21,454	50–17
68	March 29; 9:30 p.m. EST	@ Utah	W 108–104	Thomas (25)	Mahorn (11)	Thomas (8)	Salt Palace; 12,444	51–17
69	March 31; 10:00 p.m. EST	@ Seattle	W 111–108	Dumars (27)	Rodman (7)	Dumars, Thomas (4)	Seattle Center Coliseum; 14,810	52–17

April: 11–2 (home: 7–0; road: 4–2)

Game	Date	Team	Score	High points	High rebounds	High assists	Location Attendance	Record
70	April 2; 9:00 p.m. EDT	@ L.A. Clippers	W 117–101	Dumars (23)	Laimbeer (18)	Dumars, Thomas (7)	Los Angeles Memorial Sports Arena; 14,309	53–16
71	April 4; 10:30 p.m. EDT	@ Portland	L 100–118	Rodman (16)	Rodman (18)	Dumars (6)	Memorial Coliseum; 12,880	53–18
72	April 6; 7:30 p.m. EDT	Chicago	W 115–108	Dumars (20)	Laimbeer (22)	Thomas (10)	The Palace of Auburn Hills; 21,454	54–18
73	April 7; 8:00 p.m. EDT	@ Chicago	W 114–112 (OT)	Johnson (30)	Mahorn (11)	Dumars, Johnson (8)	Chicago Stadium; 18,678	55–18
74	April 9; 7:00 p.m. EDT	Milwaukee	W 100–91	Aguirre (20)	Aguirre (11)	Dumars (13)	The Palace of Auburn Hills; 21,454	56–18
75	April 10; 7:30 p.m. EDT	@ Washington	W 124–100	Laimbeer (27)	Laimbeer (11)	Dumars (11)	Capital Centre; 11,305	57–18
76	April 12; 7:30 p.m. EDT	Cleveland	W 107–95	Johnson (31)	Mahorn (11)	Dumars (11)	The Palace of Auburn Hills; 21,454	58–18
77	April 14; 8:00 p.m. EDT	@ New York	L 100–104	Laimbeer (19)	Rodman (10)	Dumars (8)	Madison Square Garden; 19,591	58–19
78	April 16; 7:00 p.m. EDT	Washington	W 104–98	Aguirre (19)	Laimbeer (10)	Dumars, Thomas (7)	The Palace of Auburn Hills; 21,454	59–19
79	April 18; 7:30 p.m. EDT	@ Cleveland	W 118–102	Dumars (42)	Mahorn (11)	Dumars (11)	Richfield Coliseum; 20,273	60–19
80	April 19; 7:30 p.m. EDT	Indiana	W 115–105	Dumars (20)	Rodman (14)	Dumars (11)	The Palace of Auburn Hills; 21,454	61–19
81	April 21; 8:00 p.m. EDT	Philadelphia	W 100–91	Aguirre (22)	Mahorn (9)	Dumars (9)	The Palace of Auburn Hills; 21,454	62–19
82	April 23; 3:30 p.m. EDT	Atlanta	W 99–81	Johnson (23)	Rodman (13)	Dumars (4)	The Palace of Auburn Hills; 21,454	63–19

1988–89 schedule

=== Detailed records ===
Eastern Conference
Opponent	Home	Away	Total	Pct.	Points scored	Points allowed
Atlantic Division
Boston Celtics	2–0	1–1	3–1	.750	417	404
Charlotte Hornets	2–0	2–0	4–0	1.000	406	370
New Jersey Nets	2–0	2–0	4–0	1.000	430	380
New York Knicks	0–2	0–2	0–4	.000	389	425
Philadelphia 76ers	2–0	3–0	5–0	1.000	557	512
Washington Bullets	3–0	2–0	5–0	1.000	557	519
	9–2	9–2	18–4	.818	2756	2610
Central Division
Atlanta Hawks	3–0	2–1	6–0	1.000	617	564
Chicago Bulls	3–0	3–0	6–0	1.000	655	603
Cleveland Cavaliers	2–1	1–2	3–3	.500	597	601
Detroit Pistons	—	—	—	—	—	—
Indiana Pacers	3–0	1–2	4–2	.667	687	652
Milwaukee Bucks	2–1	0–3	2–4	.333	613	652
	13–2	7–8	20–10	.667	3169	3072

Western Conference
Opponent	Home	Away	Total	Pct.	Points scored	Points allowed
Midwest Division
Dallas Mavericks	1–0	1–0	2–0	1.000	198	176
Denver Nuggets	1–0	0–1	1–1	.500	230	215
Houston Rockets	1–0	0–1	1–1	.500	193	192
Miami Heat	1–0	1–0	2–0	1.000	225	200
San Antonio Spurs	1–0	1–0	2–0	1.000	209	182
Utah Jazz	1–0	1–0	2–0	1.000	204	189
	6–0	4–2	10–2	.833	1263	1154
Pacific Division
Golden State Warriors	1–0	0–1	1–1	.500	224	225
Los Angeles Clippers	1–0	1–0	2–0	1.000	227	199
Los Angeles Lakers	1–0	1–0	2–0	1.000	213	202
Phoenix Suns	1–0	1–0	2–0	1.000	227	205
Portland Trail Blazers	1–0	0–1	1–1	.500	205	212
Sacramento Kings	1–0	1–0	2–0	1.000	217	184
Seattle SuperSonics	1–0	1–0	2–0	1.000	223	204
	6–0	4–2	10–2	.833	1536	1433

=== Playoffs ===
1989 playoff game log
Eastern Conference First Round: 3–0 (home: 2–0; road: 1–0)

Game	Date	Team	Score	High points	High rebounds	High assists	Location Attendance	Series
1	April 28; 8:00 p.m. EDT	Boston	W 101–91	Dumars (25)	Laimbeer (12)	Thomas (10)	The Palace of Auburn Hills; 21,454	1–0
2	April 30; 3:30 p.m. EDT	Boston	W 102–95	Thomas (26)	Laimbeer (15)	Thomas (8)	The Palace of Auburn Hills; 21,454	2–0
3	May 2; 8:00 p.m. EDT	@ Boston	W 100–85	Johnson (25)	Rodman (9)	Thomas (10)	Boston Garden; 14,890	3–0

Eastern Conference Semifinals: 4–0 (home: 2–0; road: 2–0)

Game	Date	Team	Score	High points	High rebounds	High assists	Location Attendance	Series
1	May 10; 8:00 p.m. EDT	Milwaukee	W 85–80	Laimbeer (19)	Laimbeer (17)	Dumars (6)	The Palace of Auburn Hills; 21,454	1–0
2	May 12; 8:00 p.m. EDT	Milwaukee	W 112–92	Salley (23)	Rodman (13)	Thomas (10)	The Palace of Auburn Hills; 21,454	2–0
3	May 14; 3:30 p.m. EDT	@ Milwaukee	W 110–90	Thomas (26)	Laimbeer (11)	Dumars (10)	Bradley Center; 18,633	3–0
4	May 15; 8:00 p.m. EDT	@ Milwaukee	W 96–94	Dumars (22)	Thomas (10)	Thomas (13)	Bradley Center; 18,633	4–0

Eastern Conference Finals: 4–2 (home: 2–1; road: 2–1)

Game	Date	Team	Score	High points	High rebounds	High assists	Location Attendance	Series
1	May 21; 1:00 p.m. EDT	Chicago	L 88–94	Mahorn (17)	Laimbeer (15)	Thomas (10)	The Palace of Auburn Hills; 21,454	0–1
2	May 23; 8:00 p.m. EDT	Chicago	W 100–91	Thomas (33)	Rodman (12)	Thomas (4)	The Palace of Auburn Hills; 21,454	1–1
3	May 27; 2:00 p.m. EDT	@ Chicago	L 97–99	Aguirre (25)	Rodman (13)	Thomas (11)	Chicago Stadium; 18,676	1–2
4	May 29; 3:00 p.m. EDT	@ Chicago	W 86–80	Thomas (27)	Rodman (18)	Thomas (6)	Chicago Stadium; 18,676	2–2
5	May 31; 8:00 p.m. EDT	Chicago	W 94–85	Johnson (22)	Rodman (14)	Thomas (12)	The Palace of Auburn Hills; 21,454	3–2
6	June 2; 9:00 p.m. EDT	@ Chicago	W 103–94	Thomas (33)	Rodman (15)	Dumars (9)	Chicago Stadium; 18,676	4–2

NBA Finals: 4–0 (home: 2–0; road: 2–0)

Game	Date	Team	Score	High points	High rebounds	High assists	Location Attendance	Series
1	June 6; 9:00 p.m. EDT	L.A. Lakers	W 109–97	Thomas (24)	Aguirre, Rodman (10)	Thomas (9)	The Palace of Auburn Hills; 21,454	1–0
2	June 8; 9:00 p.m. EDT	L.A. Lakers	W 108–105	Dumars (33)	Aguirre (6)	Thomas (7)	The Palace of Auburn Hills; 21,454	2–0
3	June 11; 3:30 p.m. EDT	@ L.A. Lakers	W 114–110	Dumars (31)	Rodman (19)	Thomas (8)	Great Western Forum; 17,505	3–0
4	June 13; 9:00 p.m. EDT	@ L.A. Lakers	W 105–97	Dumars (23)	Johnson, Laimbeer (6)	Dumars, Johnson, Thomas (5)	Great Western Forum; 17,505	4–0

1989 schedule

== Playoffs ==
After finishing with the best record in the NBA, the Pistons swept through the first two rounds of the playoffs. In the Eastern Conference finals, they faced the Chicago Bulls, whom they had defeated in the conference semifinals a year earlier. Although the Bulls were able to win two of the first three games, the Pistons' use of their "Jordan Rules" defense wore out Michael Jordan, setting up Detroit's second consecutive NBA Finals appearance against the Los Angeles Lakers.

== Player stats ==
Legend
GP	Games played	GS	Games started	MPG	Minutes per game
FG%	Field-goal percentage	3P%	3-point field-goal percentage	FT%	Free-throw percentage
RPG	Rebounds per game	APG	Assists per game	SPG	Steals per game
BPG	Blocks per game	PPG	Points per game

=== Regular season ===
Player	GP	GS	MPG	FG%	3P%	FT%	RPG	APG	SPG	BPG	PPG
Mark Aguirre	36	32	29.7	.483	.293	.738	4.2	2.5	.44	.19	15.5
Adrian Dantley	42	42	31.9	.521	.000	.839	3.9	2.2	.55	.14	18.4
Darryl Dawkins	14	0	3.4	.474	.000	.500	.5	.1	.00	.07	1.9
Fennis Dembo	31	0	2.4	.333	.000	.800	.7	.2	.03	.00	1.2
Joe Dumars	69	67	34.9	.505	.483	.850	2.5	5.7	.91	.07	17.2
James Edwards	76	1	16.5	.500	.000	.686	3.0	.6	.14	.41	7.3
Steve Harris	3	0	2.3	.250	.000	1.000	.7	.0	.33	.00	1.3
Vinnie Johnson	82	21	25.3	.464	.295	.734	3.1	3.0	.90	.21	13.8
Bill Laimbeer	81	81	32.6	.499	.349	.840	9.6	2.2	.63	1.23	13.7
John Long	24	1	6.3	.475	.000	.846	.5	.6	.00	.08	2.0
Rick Mahorn	72	61	24.9	.517	.000	.748	6.9	.8	.56	.92	7.2
Pace Mannion	5	0	2.8	1.000	.000	.000	.6	.0	.20	.00	.8
Dennis Rodman	82	8	26.9	.595	.231	.626	9.4	1.2	.67	.93	9.0
Jim Rowinski	6	0	1.3	.000	.000	1.000	.3	.0	.00	.00	.7
John Salley	67	21	21.8	.498	.000	.692	5.0	1.1	.60	1.07	7.0
Isiah Thomas	80	76	36.6	.464	.273	.818	3.4	8.3	1.66	.25	18.2
Micheal Williams	49	0	7.3	.364	.222	.660	.6	1.4	.27	.06	2.6

=== Playoffs ===
Player	GP	GS	MPG	FG%	3P%	FT%	RPG	APG	SPG	BPG	PPG
Mark Aguirre	17	17	27.2	.489	.276	.737	4.4	1.6	.47	.18	12.6
Fennis Dembo	2	0	2.0	1.000	.000	.000	.0	.0	.00	.00	1.0
Joe Dumars	17	17	36.5	.455	.083	.861	2.6	5.6	.71	.06	17.6
James Edwards	17	0	18.6	.471	.000	.784	2.1	.7	.06	.47	7.1
Vinnie Johnson	17	0	21.9	.455	.417	.758	2.6	2.5	.24	.18	14.1
Bill Laimbeer	17	17	29.2	.465	.357	.806	8.2	1.8	.35	.47	10.1
John Long	4	0	2.0	1.000	.000	1.000	.0	.0	.00	.00	1.2
Rick Mahorn	17	17	21.2	.580	.000	.654	5.1	.4	.53	.76	5.7
Dennis Rodman	17	0	24.1	.529	.000	.686	10.0	.9	.35	.71	5.8
John Salley	17	0	23.1	.586	.000	.667	4.6	.5	.53	1.47	8.9
Isiah Thomas	17	17	37.2	.412	.267	.740	4.3	8.3	1.59	.24	18.2
Micheal Williams	4	0	1.5	.000	.000	1.000	.5	.5	.25	.00	.5

Player statistics citation:

== NBA Finals ==
The Pistons' overpowering play allowed them to sweep the Lakers, who struggled to fill the defensive void left by Byron Scott's injury prior to the start of the Finals. Joe Dumars was named Finals MVP. In addition, Magic Johnson pulled a hamstring early in the second game, and unable to play the rest of the series. The Lakers' depleted backcourt allowed the Pistons to easily win the 1988–89 NBA Championship.

Game	Home team	Road Team	series
Game 1	Detroit 109	L.A. Lakers 97	1–0
Game 2	Detroit 108	L.A. Lakers 105	2–0
Game 3:	L.A. Lakers 110	Detroit 114	3–0
Game 4:	L.A. Lakers 97	Detroit 105	4–0

Pistons win series 4–0

== Award winners ==
- Joe Dumars, NBA Finals Most Valuable Player Award
- Joe Dumars, NBA All-Defensive First Team
- Dennis Rodman, NBA All-Defensive First Team
