= Mark Aguirre =

American basketball player (born 1959)

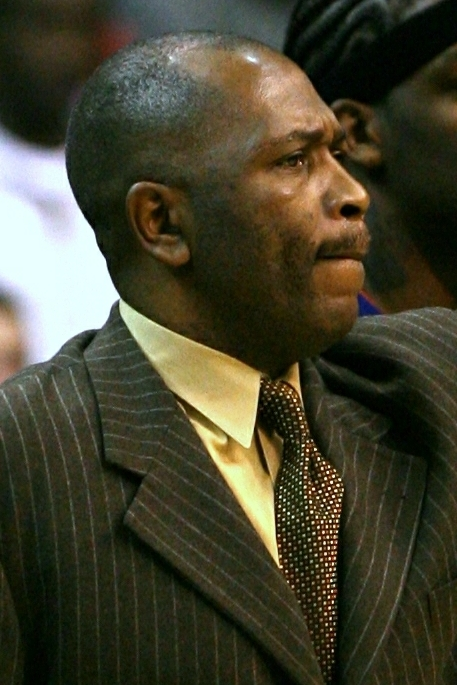
- Aguirre in 2007

Personal information
- Born: December 10, 1959 (age 66) Chicago, Illinois, U.S.
- Listed height: 6 ft 6 in (1.98 m)
- Listed weight: 232 lb (105 kg)

Career information
- High school: Austin (Chicago, Illinois); Westinghouse (Chicago, Illinois)
- College: DePaul (1978–1981)
- NBA draft: 1981: 1st round, 1st overall pick
- Drafted by: Dallas Mavericks
- Playing career: 1981–1994
- Position: Small forward / shooting guard
- Number: 24, 23, 7
- Coaching career: 2002–2008

Career history

Playing
- 1981–1989: Dallas Mavericks
- 1989–1993: Detroit Pistons
- 1993–1994: Los Angeles Clippers

Career highlights
- 2× NBA champion (1989, 1990); 3× NBA All-Star (1984, 1987, 1988); No. 24 retired by Dallas Mavericks; Sporting News College Player of the Year (1981); Naismith College Player of the Year (1980); Adolph Rupp Trophy (1980); USBWA Player of the Year (1980); AP Player of the Year (1980); UPI Player of the Year (1980); 2× Consensus first-team All-American (1980, 1981); Mr. Basketball USA (1978); Third-team Parade All-American (1978); McDonald's All-American (1978); No. 24 retired by DePaul Blue Demons (1996)

Career statistics
- Points: 18,458 (20.0 ppg)
- Rebounds: 4,578 (5.0 rpg)
- Assists: 2,818 (3.1 apg)
- Stats at NBA.com
- Stats at Basketball Reference
- Collegiate Basketball Hall of Fame

Mark Anthony Aguirre (/əɡwaɪər/ ag-WIRE; born December 10, 1959) is an American former professional basketball player in the National Basketball Association (NBA). Aguirre was chosen as the first overall pick of the 1981 NBA draft by the Dallas Mavericks after playing three years at DePaul University. Aguirre played in the NBA from 1981 until 1994 and won two championships with the Detroit Pistons after being traded to Detroit from Dallas in exchange for Adrian Dantley. Aguirre was a three-time All-Star for Dallas. Aguirre was inducted into the College Basketball Hall of Fame in 2016.

== Early life ==
Aguirre's mother, Mary, was living in Arkansas when she became pregnant with him at the age of sixteen. She moved to Chicago, Illinois, to be with her family, who helped to raise her son. Aguirre did not meet his father until he was aged six.

Aguirre was raised in Chicago and played basketball at playgrounds on the city's West Side. He began his high school playing career at Austin High School in Chicago. When his coach was fired, Aguirre transferred to George Westinghouse College Prep where he led the team to the Chicago Public High School League championship during his senior year.

== College career ==
While playing at DePaul University in Chicago, Aguirre averaged 24.5 points over three seasons with the Blue Demons under coach Ray Meyer. A two-time first team The Sporting News' All-American, Aguirre was the Naismith and US Basketball Writers College Player of the Year in 1980, and The Sporting News and Helms Foundation College Player of the Year in 1981. As a freshman in 1978–1979, he averaged 24.0 points and led the Demons to the NCAA Final Four, where they lost to a 30-0 Indiana State team led by future Basketball Hall of Famer Larry Bird.

Aguirre played two seasons alongside fellow Chicago native and future fellow NBA All-Star Terry Cummings, and averaged 26.8 and 23.0 points per game, respectively, his final two years at DePaul.

=== 1980 US Olympic Team ===
Aguirre was a member of the 1980 U.S. Olympic basketball team but was unable to compete due to the 1980 Summer Olympics boycott. He did however receive one of 461 Congressional Gold Medals created especially for the spurned athletes.

Aguirre declared for the NBA draft after his junior year at DePaul. The Dallas Mavericks selected him with the first overall pick in the 1981 NBA draft.

== Professional career ==
=== Dallas Mavericks (1981–1989) ===
Aguirre averaged 20 points per game over the course of his 13-year NBA career. He was selected as the first overall pick by the Dallas Mavericks in the 1981 NBA draft and remained with the Mavericks until 1989. In his first season Aguirre was limited to 51 games and averaged 18.7 points, second on the team to Jay Vincent (21.4 ppg). The Mavericks improved by 13 games in the win column and finished ahead of the Utah Jazz, but were still twenty games behind division-leading San Antonio Spurs.

Beginning with the 1982–83 season Aguirre reeled off six straight campaigns in which his average topped 22 points per game. In the first of those seasons he scored 24.4 points per contest, tops on the team and sixth in the league. The Mavericks continued their ascent, bettering their record to 38–44 to finish ahead of Utah and the Houston Rockets in the Midwest Division. During the 1983–84 NBA season Aguirre averaged 29.5 points per game, second in the league to Dantley's 30.6 ppg. He finished the season with 2,330 total points.

Although Aguirre was the Mavericks' main weapon, he was helped by the emergence of Rolando Blackman (22.4 ppg) and the contributions of role players Brad Davis and Pat Cummings. Dallas finished second in the Midwest at 43–39, and the team made its first playoff trip, beating the Seattle SuperSonics in the opening round before losing to the Los Angeles Lakers in the conference semifinals. In each of the next two seasons the Mavericks posted identical 44–38 records. In 1984–85 they made a quick exit from the playoffs, bowing to the Portland Trail Blazers in the first round; in 1985–86 they defeated Utah and then took the Lakers to six games in the conference semifinals. Aguirre averaged 25.7 and 22.6 points for those seasons.

In 1986–87 and 1987–88 he made the All-Star Team and averaged 25.7 and 25.1 points, respectively, during the regular season. The Mavericks won more than 50 games each year. The 1987–88 edition of the franchise went 53–29, beat Houston and the Denver Nuggets in the first two rounds of the postseason, then extended the Lakers to seven games before losing in the Western Conference Finals. It was the longest postseason run in the Mavs' eight-year history. His 13,930 points as a Maverick rank third in the franchise's history, behind Rolando Blackman's 16,643 points and Dirk Nowitzki's 31,560.

While Aguirre's time in Dallas was full of high-scoring efforts and playoff visits, the Mavericks were postseason underachievers (their only Western Conference Finals visit was the 1988 loss to the Lakers), and Aguirre had repeated conflicts with coach Dick Motta and players like Blackman, Derek Harper and James Donaldson. Then-team owner Donald Carter was a huge fan of Aguirre and hoped he would remain in Dallas for his entire career, but eventually conceded that the gulf between Aguirre and the team was unbridgeable. On February 15, 1989, midway through the 1988–89 season, Aguirre was traded to the Detroit Pistons for Adrian Dantley (who was also one of the league's top scorers) and a first round draft pick.

=== Detroit Pistons (1989–1993) ===
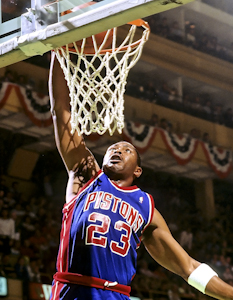
Aguirre with the Detroit Pistons in 1989

After Aguirre was traded to the team, the Pistons won the NBA title in 1989. Despite not being a lead scoring option like he was in Dallas, Aguirre played a key role in Detroit's championship run, especially in the Eastern Conference Finals against the Chicago Bulls, where he led the team in scoring with 25 points in a narrow Game 3 loss and averaged 13.7 points and 4.8 rebounds over the rest of the six-game series. He showed he could blend into a successful team by taking fewer shots, playing hard on defense, and not complaining when his younger teammate Dennis Rodman's minutes increased. In the 1990 playoffs, which culminated with Detroit repeating as champions with a five-game NBA Finals win over Portland, Aguirre averaged 11 points a game.

The following postseason, Aguirre scored his highest postseason total as a Piston, with 34 points in a Game 4 win over the Boston Celtics in the Eastern Conference Semifinals. However, in the following round, the Pistons would be defeated by Michael Jordan and the Bulls, bringing their title defense to a close. Aguirre played two more seasons with the Pistons in an increasingly limited role, due to both Rodman's play and his own age and injury issues.

=== Los Angeles Clippers (1993–1994) ===
In 1993, the Pistons released Aguirre. After he cleared waivers, the Los Angeles Clippers signed him for $150,000 for a partial campaign in 1993–94. Through the 1993–94 season, Aguirre had accumulated 18,458 points for a career average of 20.0 points per game. He was waived by the Clippers on February 1, 1994.

== Post-playing career ==
Aguirre joined DePaul University Athletics as Special Assistant to the Athletic Director in October 2023 where he would provide strategic counsel to the Vice President/Director of Athletics while maintaining relationships with DePaul alumni.

== Personal life ==
Aguirre has been married to Angela Bowman since January 1988. Aguirre, whose father was from Mexico, at one point considered playing for team Mexico at the 1992 Olympics, and was offered citizenship in an effort to convince him to do so.

== Honors ==
- Aguirre was inducted into the College Basketball Hall of Fame in 2016.
- Aguirre's #24 was retired by the DePaul Blue Demons.
- His No. 24 Dallas Mavericks jersey was retired in a ceremony on Jan. 29, 2026 when the team played the Charlotte Hornets.

== NBA career statistics ==
Legend
GP	Games played	GS	Games started	MPG	Minutes per game
FG%	Field goal percentage	3P%	3-point field goal percentage	FT%	Free throw percentage
RPG	Rebounds per game	APG	Assists per game	SPG	Steals per game
BPG	Blocks per game	PPG	Points per game	**Bold**	Career high
†	Won an NBA championship

=== Regular season ===
Year	Team	GP	GS	MPG	FG%	3P%	FT%	RPG	APG	SPG	BPG	PPG
1981–82	Dallas	51	20	28.8	.465	.352	.680	4.9	3.2	.7	.4	18.7
1982–83	Dallas	**81**	75	34.4	.483	.211	.728	**6.3**	4.1	1.0	.3	24.4
1983–84	Dallas	79	79	**36.7**	**.524**	.268	.749	5.9	4.5	1.0	.3	**29.5**
1984–85	Dallas	80	79	33.7	.506	.318	.759	6.0	3.1	.8	.3	25.7
1985–86	Dallas	74	73	33.8	.503	.286	.705	6.0	**4.6**	.8	.2	22.6
1986–87	Dallas	80	**80**	33.3	.495	.353	**.770**	5.3	3.2	**1.1**	.4	25.7
1987–88	Dallas	77	77	33.9	.475	.302	**.770**	5.6	3.6	.9	**.7**	25.1
1988–89	Dallas	44	44	34.8	.450	.293	.730	5.3	4.3	.7	**.7**	21.7
1988–89†	Detroit	36	32	29.7	.483	.293	.738	4.2	2.5	.4	.4	15.5
1989–90†	Detroit	78	40	25.7	.488	.333	.756	3.9	1.9	.4	.2	14.1
1990–91	Detroit	78	13	25.7	.462	.308	.757	4.8	1.8	.6	.3	14.2
1991–92	Detroit	75	12	21.1	.431	.211	.687	3.1	1.7	.7	.1	11.3
1992–93	Detroit	51	15	20.7	.443	.361	.767	3.0	2.1	.3	.1	9.9
1993–94	L.A. Clippers	39	0	22.0	.468	**.398**	.694	3.0	2.7	.5	.2	10.6
Career		923	639	30.0	.484	.312	.741	5.0	3.1	.7	.3	20.0
All-Star		3	0	14.0	.542	.400	.800	1.3	1.3	.7	.3	12.0

=== Playoffs ===
Year	Team	GP	GS	MPG	FG%	3P%	FT%	RPG	APG	SPG	BPG	PPG
1984	Dallas	10	10	35.0	.478	.000	.772	**7.6**	3.2	.5	**.5**	22.0
1985	Dallas	4	4	**41.0**	.494	**.500**	**.844**	7.5	4.0	.8	.0	**29.0**
1986	Dallas	10	10	34.5	.491	.333	.363	7.1	**5.4**	.9	.0	24.7
1987	Dallas	4	4	32.5	.500	.000	.767	6.0	2.0	**2.0**	.0	21.3
1988	Dallas	17	17	32.8	.500	.382	.698	5.9	3.3	.8	**.5**	21.6
1989†	Detroit	17	17	27.2	.489	.276	.737	4.4	1.6	.5	.2	12.6
1990†	Detroit	**20**	3	22.0	.467	.333	.750	4.6	1.4	.5	.2	11.0
1991	Detroit	15	2	26.5	**.506**	.364	.824	4.1	1.9	.8	.1	15.6
1992	Detroit	5	0	22.6	.333	.200	.750	1.8	2.4	.4	.2	9.0
Career		102	67	29.0	.485	.317	.743	5.3	2.6	.7	.2	17.1
