= Adrian Dantley =

American basketball player (born 1955)

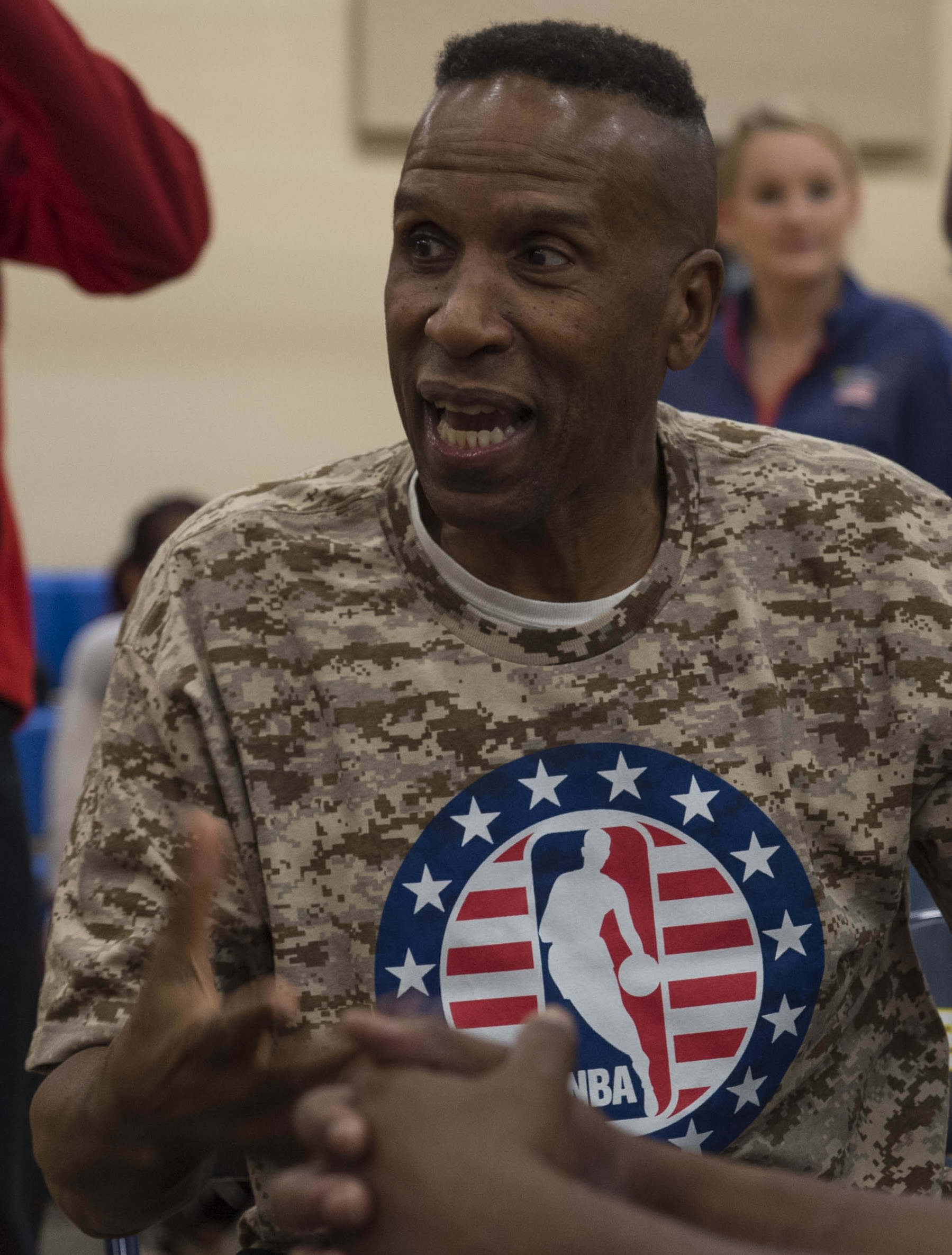
- Dantley in 2017

Personal information
- Born: February 26, 1955 (age 71) Washington, D.C., U.S.
- Listed height: 6 ft 5 in (1.96 m)
- Listed weight: 208 lb (94 kg)

Career information
- High school: DeMatha Catholic (Hyattsville, Maryland)
- College: Notre Dame (1973–1976)
- NBA draft: 1976: 1st round, 6th overall pick
- Drafted by: Buffalo Braves
- Playing career: 1976–1992
- Position: Small forward
- Number: 44, 4, 45, 7
- Coaching career: 1993–2011

Career history

Playing
- 1976–1977: Buffalo Braves
- 1977: Indiana Pacers
- 1977–1979: Los Angeles Lakers
- 1979–1986: Utah Jazz
- 1986–1989: Detroit Pistons
- 1989–1990: Dallas Mavericks
- 1991: Milwaukee Bucks
- 1991–1992: Aresium Milano

Career highlights
- 6× NBA All-Star (1980–1982, 1984–1986); 2× All-NBA Second Team (1981, 1984); NBA Comeback Player of the Year (1984); NBA Rookie of the Year (1977); NBA All-Rookie Team (1977); 2× NBA scoring champion (1981, 1984); No. 4 retired by Utah Jazz; Oscar Robertson Trophy (1976); 2× Consensus first-team All-American (1975, 1976); Mr. Basketball USA (1973); First-team Parade All-American (1973)

Career statistics
- Points: 23,177 (24.3 ppg)
- Rebounds: 5,455 (5.7 rpg)
- Assists: 2,830 (3.0 apg)
- Stats at NBA.com
- Stats at Basketball Reference
- Basketball Hall of Fame
Medals
Men's basketball
Representing United States
Olympic Games
Gold medal – first place	1976 Montreal	Team competition

Adrian Delano Dantley (born February 26, 1955) nicknamed A.D. is an American former professional basketball player and coach who played 15 seasons in the National Basketball Association (NBA). Dantley is a six-time NBA All-Star, holds two-time All-NBA honours, and is a two-time NBA scoring champion. Dantley finished ninth on the all-time NBA scoring list at the time of his retirement and was inducted into the Naismith Memorial Basketball Hall of Fame in 2008. He served as an assistant coach for the Denver Nuggets of the NBA from 2003 to 2011. He played college basketball for the Notre Dame Fighting Irish. For over 42 years, he shared the NBA single-game record for free throws made.

== Early years ==
Dantley attended DeMatha Catholic High School in Hyattsville, Maryland, where he played under Hall of Fame coach Morgan Wootten and assistant Terry Truax.

== College career ==
Dantley accepted a basketball scholarship from the University of Notre Dame. He was a consensus first-team All-American in 1974–75 and 1975–76. He ranks second on Notre Dame's career scoring list with 2,223 points and holds the school record for free throws made (615) and free throws attempted (769).

Dantley had a stellar collegiate career for the Fighting Irish. As a freshman, he played an important role in one of the biggest games in college basketball history, Notre Dame's 1974 upset to end UCLA's record 88-game winning streak. That UCLA team, coached by John Wooden, featured Bill Walton, Jamaal Wilkes (then known as Keith Wilkes), and Dave Meyers.

Dantley led Notre Dame in scoring in 1974–75 (30.4 points per game) and 1975–76 (28.6 points per game), while also leading the team in rebounding those two seasons with marks of 10.2 and 10.1 rebounds per game, respectively. He was also the leading scorer on the 1976 US Olympic team that captured the gold medal in Montreal.

Dantley declared for the 1976 NBA draft after his junior season at Notre Dame. He eventually graduated from Notre Dame with a degree in economics in August 1978.

== Professional career ==
=== Buffalo Braves ===
Dantley was selected by the Buffalo Braves sixth overall of the 1976 NBA draft. He was named a starter at small forward, averaging 20.3 points per game and became the third Buffalo player in five years to receive the NBA Rookie of the Year Award when he won it after the 1977 season.

On September 1, 1977, he was traded to the Indiana Pacers along with forward Mike Bantom, in exchange for shooting guard Billy Knight, who was the league's second-best scorer during the 1976–77 NBA season. Dantley was the first NBA Rookie of the Year to be traded following his rookie season.

=== Indiana Pacers ===
In the 1977–78 NBA season, he appeared in 23 games and ranked third in the league in scoring with a 26.6 average. On December 13, 1977, with the Pacers needing a bigger presence at center, he was traded along with undersized center Dave Robisch to the Los Angeles Lakers, in exchange for center James Edwards, shooting guard Earl Tatum and cash considerations.

=== Los Angeles Lakers ===
In the 1977–78 season, he appeared in 56 games at small forward, finishing second in team scoring behind Kareem Abdul-Jabbar with an average of 19.4 points, to go along with 7.2 rebounds and 3.4 assists per contest.

In the 1978–79 season, he was hampered by injuries, allowing small forward Jamaal Wilkes to showcase his skills. Dantley still managed to play in 60 games, averaging 17.3 points, 5.7 rebounds and 2.3 assists. He also displayed an uncanny knack for drawing fouls, leading the league in free throws made with 541 out of 680 attempts.

On September 13, 1979, the team gambled on the talents of the 26-year-old Wilkes, trading the 23-year-old Dantley to the Utah Jazz before the start of the Lakers' championship season, in exchange for the 31-year-old power forward Spencer Haywood.

=== Utah Jazz ===
In Utah, Dantley reached his peak establishing his reputation as a prolific scorer, twice leading the league in scoring (in 1981 and 1984). He averaged over 30 points per game each season between 1981 and 1984, during which he achieved his single game scoring record: 57 points in a 131–124 win over the Bulls on December 4, 1982. Dantley missed 60 games in 1983 after tearing ligaments in his right wrist. In 1984, Dantley recorded his postseason career high in single game scoring, 46 points in a Western Conference Semifinals Game 5 win over the Suns. However, the Jazz would go on to lose the series. That offseason, he was named the NBA Comeback Player of the Year.

In his seven years with the Jazz, Dantley picked up all six of his All-Star appearances and two All-NBA second-team honors. During the 1980 NBA All-Star Game, Dantley was the first Utah Jazz player (since the team moved from New Orleans) to play in an All-Star game, and led the West in scoring with 23 points during a 144–136 loss. The total would also be the highest amount Dantley would score in his six All-Star games. Dantley's 1980–1984 seasons include two of the top three and four of the top seven spots in true shooting percentage for players averaging at least 30 points per game. Dantley's relationship with head coach Frank Layden began to deteriorate when he had held out the first six games of the 1984–85 season and it grew worse from there. The following season he was sent home for a game after defending rookie Karl Malone in an argument with Layden (after Malone missed free throws late in a game) and was symbolically fined "30 dimes". Dantley would be forced to miss the entire first round of the 1986 NBA Playoffs due to muscle spasms in his lower back to Layden's dismay, causing him to look for trade destinations for Dantley. In his absence, the Jazz would lose in 4 games to the Dallas Mavericks. On January 4, 1984, Dantley tied Wilt Chamberlain's NBA record for single-game free throws made (28) against Houston Rockets. This record stood until Bam Adebayo made 36 on March 10, 2026.

On August 21, 1986, after dispute over his contract negotiations with Layden, he was traded with second-round draft choices in 1987 (#38-Norris Coleman) and 1990 (#49-Phil Henderson) to the Detroit Pistons in exchange for shooting guard Kelly Tripucka and center Kent Benson. Team president Dave Checketts stated at the time of the trade: "We knew we had to get rid of him and we were never so happy to get rid of a guy in the history of the franchise.” As it turned out, Tripucka and Benson would play a combined three seasons for Utah.

=== Detroit Pistons ===
In the 1986–87 season, Dantley was still an effective scorer but did not get as many shots with Isiah Thomas, Joe Dumars, Vinnie Johnson, and Bill Laimbeer all averaging at least 10 points per game. Dantley was knocked unconscious while diving for a loose ball in Game 7 of the 1987 Eastern Conference Finals.

On February 15, 1989, midway through the season he was traded to the Dallas Mavericks along with a 1991 first-round draft pick (#19-LaBradford Smith), in exchange for Mark Aguirre, due to what Dantley maintained were conflicts with Thomas, but also reflected Dantley's clashes with head coach Chuck Daly and general manager Jack McCloskey over his demand for a focal point role on offense and more minutes than Dennis Rodman.

=== Final years and retirement ===
In the 1989–90 season, he averaged 14.7 points in 45 games with the Dallas Mavericks, before missing the final two months with a broken leg. On April 2, 1990, he was released after playing in two seasons (76 games).

On April 2, 1991, after being out of basketball for most of the season, he signed as a free agent with the Milwaukee Bucks, where he played 13 games (3 in the playoffs).

On September 18, 1991, Dantley signed with Italian team Breeze Arese for the 1991–92 season. He averaged 26.7 points per game.

== Player profile ==
Although listed as a small forward due to his size, Dantley played primarily in the low post, similar to a power forward. Dantley finished his NBA career with an average of 24.3 points per game. He scored his points with a mix of flat-footed mid-range jump shots, high-percentage opportunities close to the basket, and frequent trips to the free throw line. For his career, he shot .540 from the floor—16th in NBA history—and .818 from the free throw line. He led the league in free throws six times and ranks ninth all-time in that category. Dantley previously held the record (shared with Wilt Chamberlain) for most free throws made in a regular-season NBA game with 28. Bam Adebayo broke the record with 36 made free throws on March 10, 2026.

Dantley was regarded as one of the NBA's best free-throw shooters. Before each free throw, he followed a set routine of four two-handed dribbles and two spins of the ball. He also reportedly repeated a mantra from junior high – "Over the front rim, backspin, follow through" – which reflected his strong emphasis on fundamentals.

His ability to score in the low post was even more remarkable considering one of his legs is significantly shorter than the other. To compensate for the nearly 2 inch difference in leg length, he wore custom-made inserts in his shoes.

== NBA career statistics ==
Legend
GP	Games played	GS	Games started	MPG	Minutes per game
FG%	Field goal percentage	3P%	3-point field goal percentage	FT%	Free throw percentage
RPG	Rebounds per game	APG	Assists per game	SPG	Steals per game
BPG	Blocks per game	PPG	Points per game	**Bold**	Career high
*	Led the league

=== Regular season ===
Year	Team	GP	GS	MPG	FG%	3P%	FT%	RPG	APG	SPG	BPG	PPG
1976–77	Buffalo	77	–	36.6	.520	–	.818	7.6	1.9	1.2	0.2	20.3
1977–78	Indiana	23	–	41.2	.499	–	.787	**9.4**	2.8	**2.1**	**0.7**	26.5
1977–78	L.A. Lakers	56	–	35.4	.520	–	.801	7.2	3.4	1.3	0.1	19.4
1978–79	L.A. Lakers	60	–	29.6	.510	–	.854	5.7	2.3	1.1	0.2	17.3
1979–80	Utah	68	–	39.3	.576	.000	.842	7.6	2.8	1.4	0.2	28.0
1980–81	Utah	80	–	**42.7***	.559	.286	.806	6.4	4.0	1.4	0.2	**30.7***
1981–82	Utah	**81**	**81**	39.8	.570	**.333**	.792	6.3	4.0	1.2	0.2	30.3
1982–83	Utah	22	22	40.3	**.580**	–	.847	6.4	**4.8**	0.9	0.0	**30.7**
1983–84	Utah	79	79	37.8	.558	.250	.859	5.7	3.9	0.8	0.1	30.6*
1984–85	Utah	55	46	35.8	.531	–	.804	5.9	3.4	1.0	0.1	26.6
1985–86	Utah	76	75	36.1	.563	.091	.791	5.2	3.5	0.8	0.1	29.8
1986–87	Detroit	**81**	**81**	33.8	.534	.167	.812	4.1	2.0	0.8	0.1	21.5
1987–88	Detroit	69	50	31.1	.514	.000	**.860**	3.3	2.5	0.6	0.1	20.0
1988–89	Detroit	42	42	31.9	.521	–	.839	3.9	2.2	0.5	0.1	18.4
1988–89	Dallas	31	25	34.9	.462	.000	.776	4.9	2.5	0.6	0.2	20.3
1989–90	Dallas	45	45	28.9	.477	.000	.787	3.8	1.8	0.4	0.2	14.7
1990–91	Milwaukee	10	0	12.6	.380	**.333**	.692	1.3	0.9	0.5	0.0	5.7
Career		955	546	35.8	.540	.171	.818	5.7	3.0	1.0	0.2	24.3
All-Star		6	5	21.7	.426	–	.895	3.8	1.2	1.0	0.0	10.5

=== Playoffs ===
Year	Team	GP	GS	MPG	FG%	3P%	FT%	RPG	APG	SPG	BPG	PPG
1978	L.A. Lakers	3	–	34.7	**.571**	–	.647	**8.3**	3.7	**1.7**	**1.0**	17.0
1979	L.A. Lakers	8	–	29.5	.562	–	.788	4.1	1.4	0.8	0.1	17.6
1984	Utah	11	–	**41.3**	.504	–	**.863**	7.5	**4.2**	0.9	0.1	**32.2**
1985	Utah	10	10	39.8	.523	.000	.779	7.5	2.0	1.6	0.0	25.3
1987	Detroit	15	15	33.3	.539	–	.775	4.5	2.3	0.9	0.0	20.5
1988	Detroit	**23**	**23**	35.0	.524	.000	.787	4.7	2.0	0.8	0.0	19.4
1991	Milwaukee	3	0	6.3	.143	–	.750	1.3	0.0	0.0	0.0	1.7
Career		73	48	34.5	.525	.000	.796	5.4	2.3	0.9	0.1	21.3

== Honors ==
Utah retired Dantley's uniform number (#4) on April 11, 2007.

Dantley enjoyed outstanding success at every level of basketball, including high school, college, Olympics, and the NBA. On April 7, 2008, he was elected to the Naismith Memorial Basketball Hall of Fame.

== Coaching ==
Dantley was an assistant basketball coach at then-Towson State from August 1993 to 1996. Dantley had played for Towson head coach Terry Truax in high school.

Dantley later worked for the Denver Nuggets as an assistant coach for eight seasons. He briefly served as the team's head coach during the 2009–10 NBA season, filling in for George Karl, who was fighting cancer.

In addition to playing professionally, in his spare time, Dantley coaches basketball to aspiring players in Silver Spring, Maryland. He also officiates games at the Upper County Community Center in Gaithersburg, Maryland.

== Personal life ==
Dantley's son, Cameron Dantley, was the starting quarterback for the Syracuse Orange during the 2008 season.

Dantley works as a referee for high school and recreational league games in the DC area. In 2013 it was reported that Dantley also worked as a crossing guard at Eastern Middle School in Silver Spring, Maryland. Dantley was quoted saying he 'got bored sitting around the house' and took the job helping school children safely cross the street.

== See also ==
- List of NBA career scoring leaders
- List of NBA career turnovers leaders
- List of NBA career field goal percentage leaders
- List of NBA career free throw scoring leaders
- List of NBA annual scoring leaders
- List of NBA annual minutes leaders
