= 1988–89 Chicago Bulls season =

NBA professional basketball team season

- Head coach: Doug Collins
- President: Jerry Krause
- General manager: Jerry Krause
- Owner: Jerry Reinsdorf
- Arena: Chicago Stadium

Results
- Record: 47–35 (.573)
- Place: Division: 5th (Central); Conference: 6th (Eastern)
- Playoff finish: Eastern Conference finals (lost to Pistons 2–4)
- Stats at Basketball Reference

Local media
- Television: WFLD; Sportsvision (Jim Durham, Johnny “Red” Kerr)
- Radio: WLUP (Jim Durham, Johnny “Red” Kerr)

The 1988–89 Chicago Bulls season was the 23rd season for the Chicago Bulls in the National Basketball Association.

== Season summary ==
=== Off-season ===
The Bulls had the eleventh overall pick in the 1988 NBA draft, and selected center Will Perdue out of Vanderbilt University. During the off-season, the team acquired Bill Cartwright from the New York Knicks before draft day, and then later on acquired three-point specialist Craig Hodges from the Phoenix Suns in December.

=== Regular season ===
With the addition of Cartwright, the Bulls struggled with a 6–8 start to the regular season, but played above .500 in winning percentage for the remainder of the season. The team posted a six-game winning streak in January, and later on held a 27–19 record at the All-Star break. The Bulls posted another six-game winning streak in March, but posted a six-game losing streak in April, while losing eight of their final ten games of the season. The Bulls finished in fifth place in the Central Division with a 47–35 record, earned the sixth seed in the Eastern Conference, and qualified for the NBA playoffs for the fifth consecutive year.

Michael Jordan led the league in scoring averaging 32.5 points, 8.0 rebounds, 8.0 assists and 2.9 steals per game, and was named to the All-NBA First Team, and to the NBA All-Defensive First Team. In addition, second-year forward Scottie Pippen showed improvement, replacing Brad Sellers as the team's starting small forward during the regular season, and averaging 14.4 points, 6.1 rebounds and 1.9 steals per game, while Cartwright provided the team with 12.4 points and 6.7 rebounds per game, and second-year forward Horace Grant provided with 12.0 points and 8.6 rebounds per game. Meanwhile, Hodges contributed 10.0 points per game in 49 games after the trade, Sam Vincent provided with 9.4 points and 4.8 assists per game, John Paxson contributed 7.3 points and 3.9 assists per game, Sellers contributed 6.9 points per game, and Dave Corzine averaged 5.9 points and 3.9 rebounds per game.

During the NBA All-Star weekend at the Houston Astrodome in Houston, Texas, Jordan was selected for the 1989 NBA All-Star Game, as a member of the Eastern Conference All-Star team. Jordan scored 28 points along with 5 steals, despite the Eastern Conference losing to the Western Conference, 143–134. Meanwhile, Hodges participated in the NBA Three-Point Shootout for the fourth consecutive year. Jordan finished in second place in Most Valuable Player voting, behind Magic Johnson of the Los Angeles Lakers, and also finished in fifth place in Defensive Player of the Year voting, while Pippen finished tied in seventh place in Most Improved Player voting.

The Bulls finished fourth in the NBA in home-game attendance, with an attendance of 736,962 at the Chicago Stadium during the regular season.

=== NBA playoffs ===
In the Eastern Conference First Round of the 1989 NBA playoffs, and for the second consecutive year, the Bulls faced off against the 3rd–seeded Cleveland Cavaliers, a team that featured the quartet of All-Star center Brad Daugherty, All-Star guard Mark Price, All-Star forward Larry Nance, and Ron Harper. The Bulls took a 2–1 series lead before losing Game 4 to the Cavaliers at home in overtime, 108–105 at the Chicago Stadium, despite a 50-point performance from Jordan. With the series tied at 2–2, the Bulls won Game 5 over the Cavaliers on the road, 101–100 at the Coliseum at Richfield, in which Jordan hit a memorable game-winning shot over Cavaliers guard Craig Ehlo at the buzzer; the Bulls won the series over the Cavaliers in five hard-fought games.

In the Eastern Conference Semi-finals, the team faced off against the 2nd–seeded, and Atlantic Division champion New York Knicks, who were led by All-Star center Patrick Ewing, All-Star guard Mark Jackson, and former Bulls forward Charles Oakley. With the series tied at 1–1, the Bulls won the next two games at home, including a Game 4 win over the Knicks at the Chicago Stadium, 106–93 to take a 3–1 series lead; in Game 4, Jordan posted a double-double of 47 points and 11 rebounds. After losing Game 5 on the road, 121–114 at Madison Square Garden, the Bulls won Game 6 over the Knicks at the Chicago Stadium, 113–111 to win the series in six games.

In the Eastern Conference Finals, and also for the second consecutive year, the Bulls faced off against the top–seeded, and Central Division champion Detroit Pistons, who were led by the trio of All-Star guard Isiah Thomas, Joe Dumars and Bill Laimbeer. The Bulls managed to win Game 1 over the Pistons on the road, 94–88 at The Palace of Auburn Hills, before losing Game 2 on the road by a score of 100–91, as the Pistons evened the series. The Bulls won Game 3 over the Pistons at the Chicago Stadium, 99–97, in which Jordan scored 46 points as the Bulls took a 2–1 series lead. However, the Bulls lost the next three games, including a Game 6 loss to the Pistons at the Chicago Stadium, 103–94, thus losing the series in six games.

The Pistons would advance to the NBA Finals for the second consecutive year, and defeat the 2-time defending NBA champion Los Angeles Lakers in a four-game sweep in the 1989 NBA Finals, winning their first ever NBA championship in franchise history.

=== Aftermath ===
Following the season, head coach Doug Collins was fired after three seasons with the Bulls, while Vincent was left unprotected in the 1989 NBA expansion draft, where he was selected by the Orlando Magic expansion team, Sellers was traded to the Seattle SuperSonics, and Corzine was released to free agency.

== Draft picks ==
Round	Pick	Player	Position	Nationality	School/Club team
1	11	Will Perdue	C	United States	Vanderbilt
3	62	Derrick Lewis	F	United States	Maryland

== Roster ==
1988–89 Chicago Bulls roster
Players

Pos.	No.	Player	Height	Weight	DOB	From
C	24	Bill Cartwright	7 ft 1 in (2.16 m)	245 lb (111 kg)	1957–07–30	San Francisco
C	40	Dave Corzine	6 ft 11 in (2.11 m)	250 lb (113 kg)	1956–04–25	DePaul
F	22	Charles Davis	6 ft 7 in (2.01 m)	215 lb (98 kg)	1958–10–05	Vanderbilt
F	54	Horace Grant	6 ft 10 in (2.08 m)	245 lb (111 kg)	1965–07–04	Clemson
F/C	15	Jack Haley	6 ft 10 in (2.08 m)	240 lb (109 kg)	1964–01–27	UCLA
G	14	Craig Hodges	6 ft 2 in (1.88 m)	190 lb (86 kg)	1960–06–27	Long Beach State
G	23	Michael Jordan	6 ft 6 in (1.98 m)	215 lb (98 kg)	1963–02–17	North Carolina
G	5	John Paxson	6 ft 2 in (1.88 m)	185 lb (84 kg)	1960–09–29	Notre Dame
C	32	Will Perdue	7 ft 0 in (2.13 m)	240 lb (109 kg)	1965–08–29	Vanderbilt
F	33	Scottie Pippen	6 ft 7 in (2.01 m)	220 lb (100 kg)	1965–09–25	Central Arkansas
F	2	Brad Sellers	7 ft 0 in (2.13 m)	210 lb (95 kg)	1962–12–17	Ohio State
G	11	Sam Vincent	6 ft 2 in (1.88 m)	185 lb (84 kg)	1963–05–18	Michigan State

Coaches
Head coach
- Doug Collins
Assistant(s)
- Johnny Bach
- Phil Jackson
- Tex Winter

Legend
- (DP) Unsigned draft pick
- (FA) Free agent
- (S) Suspended
- Injured

Roster
Updated: April 23, 1989

== Regular season ==
In the 1988–89 season, Jordan again led the league in scoring, averaging 32.5 ppg on 53.8% shooting from the field. The Bulls finished with a 47–35 record, and advanced to the Eastern Conference Finals. On March 11, 1989, head coach Doug Collins moved Jordan to the point guard position. Two days later, Jordan finished with 21 points, 14 rebounds, and 14 assists in just 30 minutes of a blowout win against the Pacers. Jordan continued at point guard through the rest of the regular season.

=== Season standings ===
Central Division	W	L	PCT	GB	Home	Road	Div
y-Detroit Pistons	63	19	.768	–	37–4	26–15	20–10
x-Cleveland Cavaliers	57	25	.695	6	37–4	20–21	19–11
x-Atlanta Hawks	52	30	.634	11	33–8	19–22	20–10
x-Milwaukee Bucks	49	33	.598	14	31–10	18–23	11–19
x-Chicago Bulls	47	35	.573	16	30–11	17–24	12–18
Indiana Pacers	28	54	.341	35	20–21	8–33	8–22

#	Eastern Conference				
#	Team	W	L	PCT	GB
1	z-Detroit Pistons	63	19	.768	–
2	y-New York Knicks	52	30	.634	11
3	x-Cleveland Cavaliers	57	25	.695	6
4	x-Atlanta Hawks	52	30	.634	11
5	x-Milwaukee Bucks	49	33	.598	14
6	x-Chicago Bulls	47	35	.573	16
7	x-Philadelphia 76ers	46	36	.561	17
8	x-Boston Celtics	42	40	.512	21
9	Washington Bullets	40	42	.488	23
10	Indiana Pacers	28	54	.341	35
11	New Jersey Nets	26	56	.317	37
12	Charlotte Hornets	20	62	.244	43

== Game log ==
=== Regular season ===
1988–89 game log
Total: 47–35 (home: 31–10; road: 16–25)
November: 6–8 (home: 4–0; road: 2–8)

Game	Date	Team	Score	High points	High rebounds	High assists	Location Attendance	Record
1	November 4, 1988	Detroit	L 94–107				Chicago Stadium	0–1
3	November 8, 1988	@ New York	L 117–126				Madison Square Garden	1–2
13	November 29, 1988	@ Golden State	L 99–109				Oakland–Alameda County Coliseum Arena	6–7

December: 9–4 (home: 6–2; road: 3–2)

Game	Date	Team	Score	High points	High rebounds	High assists	Location Attendance	Record
17	December 7, 1988	@ Detroit	L 89–102				The Palace of Auburn Hills	8–9
18	December 9, 1988	Milwaukee	W 118–100				Chicago Stadium	9–9
22	December 17, 1988	@ Milwaukee	W 112–93				Bradley Center	12–10
23	December 20, 1988	L.A. Lakers	W 116–103				Chicago Stadium	13–10
26	December 29, 1988	New York	W 108–106				Chicago Stadium	14–12

January: 9–5 (home: 6–3; road: 3–2)

Game	Date	Team	Score	High points	High rebounds	High assists	Location Attendance	Record
37	January 21, 1989	Phoenix	L 107–116				Chicago Stadium	22–15
41	January 31, 1989	Detroit	L 98–104 (OT)				Chicago Stadium	24–17

February: 9–4 (home: 6–1; road: 3–3)

Game	Date	Team	Score	High points	High rebounds	High assists	Location Attendance	Record
44	February 5, 1989	@ Detroit	L 102–113				The Palace of Auburn Hills	25–19
All-Star Break
48	February 16, 1989	Milwaukee	W 117–116				Chicago Stadium	28–20
49	February 19, 1989	@ Milwaukee	W 108–106				Bradley Center	29–20

March: 10–6 (home: 5–2; road: 5–4)

Game	Date	Team	Score	High points	High rebounds	High assists	Location Attendance	Record
55	March 3, 1989	Milwaukee	W 102–96				Chicago Stadium	34–21
56	March 4, 1989	@ New York	L 104–122				Madison Square Garden	34–22
59	March 11, 1989	Seattle	W 105–88				Chicago Stadium	35–24
62	March 17, 1989	New York	W 129–124				Chicago Stadium	37–25
64	March 21, 1989	@ L.A. Lakers	W 104–103				Great Western Forum	38–26
65	March 22, 1989	@ Phoenix	W 112–111				Arizona Veterans Memorial Coliseum	39–26
67	March 25, 1989	@ Seattle	W 111–110				Seattle Center Coliseum	41–26
68	March 28, 1989	Golden State	W 115–106				Chicago Stadium	42–26
69	March 29, 1989	@ Milwaukee	W 106–102				Bradley Center	43–26

April: 4–8 (home: 4–2; road: 0–6)

Game	Date	Team	Score	High points	High rebounds	High assists	Location Attendance	Record
73	April 6, 1989	@ Detroit	L 108–115				The Palace of Auburn Hills	45–28
74	April 7, 1989	Detroit	L 112–114 (OT)				Chicago Stadium	45–29
79	April 17, 1989	New York	W 104–100				Chicago Stadium	46–33

1988–89 schedule

=== Playoffs ===
1989 playoff game log
Eastern Conference First Round: 3–2 (home: 1–1; road: 2–1)

Game	Date	Team	Score	High points	High rebounds	High assists	Location Attendance	Series
1	April 28, 1989	@ Cleveland	W 95–88	Jordan (31)	Grant (13)	Jordan (11)	Richfield Coliseum; 19,312	1–0
2	April 30, 1989	@ Cleveland	L 88–96	Jordan (30)	Grant (14)	Jordan (10)	Richfield Coliseum; 20,273	1–1
3	May 3, 1989	Cleveland	W 101–94	Jordan (44)	Grant (17)	Jordan (10)	Chicago Stadium; 17,721	2–1
4	May 5, 1989	Cleveland	L 105–108 (OT)	Jordan (50)	Grant (16)	Hodges, Pippen (5)	Chicago Stadium; 18,264	2–2
5	May 7, 1989	@ Cleveland	W 101–100	Jordan (44)	Pippen (10)	Jordan (6)	Richfield Coliseum; 20,273	3–2

Eastern Conference semifinals: 4–2 (home: 3–0; road: 1–2)

Game	Date	Team	Score	High points	High rebounds	High assists	Location Attendance	Series
1	May 9, 1989	@ New York	W 120–109 (OT)	Jordan (34)	Cartwright (14)	Jordan (12)	Madison Square Garden; 19,591	1–0
2	May 11, 1989	@ New York	L 97–114	Paxson (16)	Davis (9)	Pippen (5)	Madison Square Garden; 19,591	1–1
3	May 13, 1989	New York	W 111–88	Jordan (40)	Jordan (15)	Jordan (9)	Chicago Stadium; 18,599	2–1
4	May 14, 1989	New York	W 106–93	Jordan (47)	Jordan (11)	Pippen (8)	Chicago Stadium; 18,637	3–1
5	May 16, 1989	@ New York	L 114–121	Jordan (38)	Pippen (9)	Jordan (10)	Madison Square Garden; 19,591	3–2
6	May 19, 1989	New York	W 113–111	Jordan (40)	Cartwright (8)	Jordan (10)	Chicago Stadium; 18,676	4–2

Eastern Conference finals: 2–4 (home: 1–2; road: 1–2)

Game	Date	Team	Score	High points	High rebounds	High assists	Location Attendance	Series
1	May 21, 1989	@ Detroit	W 94–88	Jordan (32)	Jordan, Pippen (11)	Pippen (6)	The Palace of Auburn Hills; 21,454	1–0
2	May 23, 1989	@ Detroit	L 91–100	Jordan (27)	Grant (20)	Paxson (6)	The Palace of Auburn Hills; 21,454	1–1
3	May 27, 1989	Detroit	W 99–97	Jordan (46)	Pippen (8)	Hodges, Jordan (5)	Chicago Stadium; 18,676	2–1
4	May 29, 1989	Detroit	L 80–86	Jordan (23)	Grant (12)	Hodges (5)	Chicago Stadium; 18,676	2–2
5	May 31, 1989	@ Detroit	L 85–94	Hodges (19)	Cartwright (12)	Jordan (9)	The Palace of Auburn Hills; 21,454	2–3
6	June 2, 1989	Detroit	L 94–103	Jordan (32)	Grant (13)	Jordan (13)	Chicago Stadium; 18,676	2–4

1989 schedule

== Player stats ==
Legend
GP	Games played	GS	Games started	MPG	Minutes per game
FG%	Field-goal percentage	3P%	3-point field-goal percentage	FT%	Free-throw percentage
RPG	Rebounds per game	APG	Assists per game	SPG	Steals per game
BPG	Blocks per game	PPG	Points per game

=== Regular season ===
Player	GP	GS	MPG	FG%	3P%	FT%	RPG	APG	SPG	BPG	PPG
Bill Cartwright	78	76	29.9	.475	.000	.766	6.7	1.2	.27	.53	12.4
Dave Corzine	81	7	18.3	.461	.250	.740	3.9	1.3	.36	.56	5.9
Charles Davis	49	3	11.1	.426	.267	.731	2.3	.6	.22	.10	3.8
Horace Grant	79	79	35.6	.519	.000	.704	8.6	2.1	1.09	.78	12.0
Jack Haley	51	1	5.7	.474	.000	.783	1.4	.2	.22	.00	2.2
Craig Hodges	49	6	22.7	.475	.423	.849	1.7	2.8	.84	.08	10.0
Anthony Jones	8	0	8.1	.333	.000	1.000	1.0	.5	.25	.12	1.5
Michael Jordan	81	81	40.2	.538	.276	.850	8.0	8.0	2.89	.80	32.5
Ed Nealy	13	0	7.2	.714	.000	.500	1.8	.5	.23	.08	.8
John Paxson	78	20	22.3	.480	.331	.861	1.2	3.9	.68	.08	7.3
Will Perdue	30	0	6.3	.403	.000	.571	1.5	.4	.13	.20	2.2
Scottie Pippen	73	56	33.1	.476	.273	.668	6.1	3.5	1.90	.84	14.4
Dominic Pressley	3	0	5.7	.167	.000	.000	.3	1.3	.00	.00	.7
Brad Sellers	80	25	21.6	.485	.500	.851	2.8	1.2	.44	.86	6.9
Sam Vincent	70	56	24.3	.484	.118	.822	2.7	4.8	.76	.14	9.4
David Wood	2	0	1.0	.000	.000	.000	.0	.0	.00	.00	.0

=== Playoffs ===
Player	GP	GS	MPG	FG%	3P%	FT%	RPG	APG	SPG	BPG	PPG
Bill Cartwright	17		34.3	.486	.000	.700	7.1	1.2	.53	.71	11.8
Dave Corzine	16		13.7	.422	.000	.647	2.6	.6	.25	.38	4.1
Charles Davis	17		11.2	.404	.167	.778	2.5	.3	.24	.06	2.7
Horace Grant	17		36.8	.518	.000	.800	9.8	2.1	.65	.94	10.8
Jack Haley	5		1.4	.667	.000	.500	.2	.2	.00	.00	1.0
Craig Hodges	17		32.6	.412	.398	.714	1.5	3.6	1.29	.18	11.2
Michael Jordan	17		42.2	.510	.286	.799	7.0	7.6	2.47	.76	34.8
John Paxson	16		18.9	.474	.263	.875	.6	2.1	.75	.00	5.8
Will Perdue	3		7.3	.667	.000	.667	2.0	.7	.00	.00	4.7
Scottie Pippen	17		36.4	.462	.393	.640	7.6	3.9	1.35	.94	13.1
Brad Sellers	13		13.6	.379	.000	.833	2.4	1.2	.23	.31	4.2
Sam Vincent	16		7.1	.303	.000	.750	.5	1.2	.19	.06	1.8

Player statistics citation:

== Awards and honors ==
- Craig Hodges, NBA All-Star Weekend Three-Point Shootout Winner
- Michael Jordan, All-NBA First Team
- Michael Jordan, NBA All-Defensive First Team
- Michael Jordan, NBA All-Star Game
