= Brendan Suhr =

American basketball coach (born 1951)

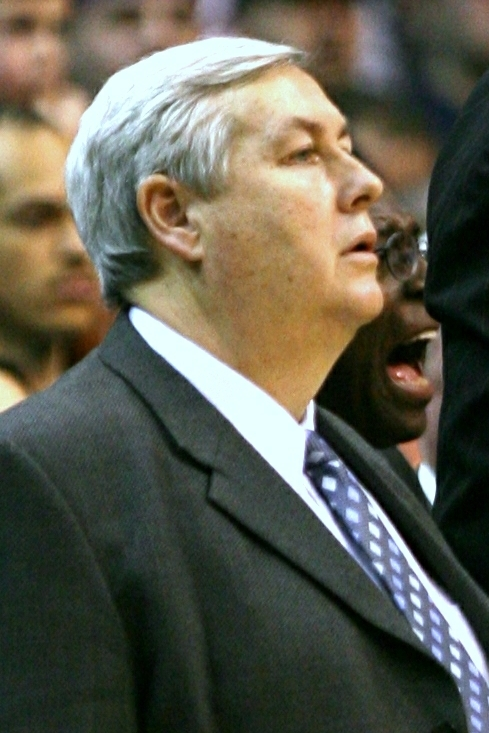
- Suhr in 2007

Current position
- Title: Assistant coach
- Team: Sacramento Kings
- Conference: NBA

Biographical details
- Born: April 28, 1951 (age 75); Fair Lawn, New Jersey, U.S.

Playing career
- 1970–1973: Montclair State
- Position: Guard

Coaching career (HC unless noted)
- 1973–1974: U of Detroit (asst.)
- 1974–1979: Fairfield (asst.)
- 1979–1988: Atlanta Hawks (asst.)
- 1988–1992: Detroit Pistons (asst.)
- 1992–1994: New Jersey Nets (asst.)
- 1995–1997: Grand Rapids Mackers/Hoops
- 1996–1997: Toronto Raptors (asst.)
- 1997–1999: Orlando Magic (asst.)
- 2000–2001: Detroit Pistons (asst.)
- 2004–2007: New York Knicks (asst.)
- 2010–2012: UCF (dir. development)
- 2012–2013: UCF (asst.)
- 2013–2015: UCF (dir. development)
- 2015–2017: LSU (assoc. HC)
- 2019–2020: Stetson (asst.)
- 2026–present: Sacramento Kings (asst.)

Head coaching record
- Overall: 65–47 (CBA)

Accomplishments and honors

Championships
- 2× NBA (1989, 1990); CBA Eastern Division (1996)

Awards
- CBA Coach of the Year (1996)

Brendan Ahearn Suhr (born April 28, 1951) is an American basketball coach who currently serves as an assistant coach for the Sacramento Kings of the National Basketball Association (NBA).

== Career ==
Suhr received his bachelor's degree from Montclair State University in 1973 and his master's degree in education administration from Fairfield University in 1979. He began his coaching career on the college level as an assistant at the University of Detroit Mercy, before moving to Fairfield University for five seasons. Suhr was a longtime NBA assistant coach and worked on two NBA championship teams with the Detroit Pistons, in 1988-89 and 1989–90.

From 1995 to 1997, Suhr was head coach for the Grand Rapids Mackers (later Hoops) of the Continental Basketball Association. He was CBA Coach of the Year in 1996 for leading Grand Rapids to a 33–23 record and first-place finish in the Eastern Division. Grand Rapids went 32–24 and second in the CBA Eastern Division in 1996–97.

Suhr was named an assistant on Donnie Jones' staff at Stetson on May 15, 2019.

On September 14, 2026, Suhr was hired to serve as an assistant coach for the Sacramento Kings under head coach Doug Christie.
