= Chuck Daly =

American basketball coach (1930–2009)

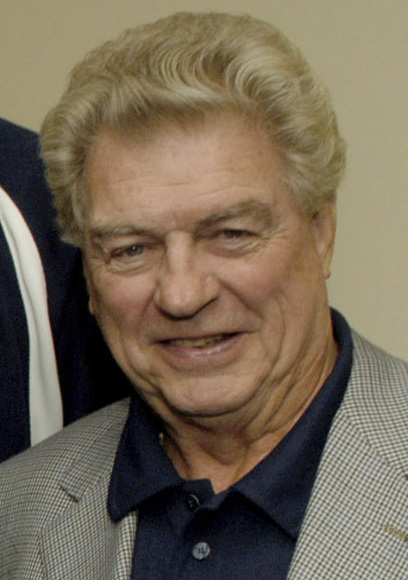
- Daly in 2006

Personal information
- Born: July 20, 1930 Kane, Pennsylvania, U.S.
- Died: May 9, 2009 (aged 78) Jupiter, Florida, U.S.
- Listed height: 6 ft 2 in (1.88 m)
- Listed weight: 180 lb (82 kg)

Career information
- High school: Kane (Kane, Pennsylvania)
- College: Bloomsburg (1949–1952)
- Coaching career: 1955–1999

Career highlights
- As head coach: 2× NBA champion (1989, 1990); NBA All-Star Game head coach (1990); Top 10 Coaches in NBA History; Top 15 Coaches in NBA History; No. 2 retired by Detroit Pistons; 4× Ivy League champion (1971–1974); 5× Big 5 champion (1971–1974, 1977); As assistant coach: 3× NCAA final Four Appearances (1963, 1964, 1966); 3× ACC Tournament champion (1963, 1964, 1966); 4× ACC Regular Season champion (1963–1966)

Career coaching record
- NBA: 638–437 (.593)
- College: 151–62 (.709)
- Record at Basketball Reference
- Basketball Hall of Fame
- FIBA Hall of Fame
- Collegiate Basketball Hall of Fame
Medals
Head Coach for United States
Olympic Games
Gold medal – first place	1992 Barcelona	Head coach

Charles Jerome Daly (July 20, 1930 – May 9, 2009) was an American basketball head coach. He led the Detroit Pistons to two consecutive National Basketball Association (NBA) championships in 1989 and 1990—during the team's "Bad Boys" era—and the 1992 United States men's Olympic basketball team ("The Dream Team") to the gold medal at the 1992 Summer Olympics.

Daly is a two-time Naismith Memorial Basketball Hall of Fame inductee, being inducted in 1994 for his individual coaching career, and in 2010 was posthumously inducted as the head coach of the "Dream Team". The Chuck Daly Lifetime Achievement Award is named after him.

== Early life ==
Born in Kane, Pennsylvania, to Earl and Geraldine Daly on July 20, 1930, Daly attended Kane Area High School. He matriculated at St. Bonaventure University for one year before transferring to Bloomsburg University of Pennsylvania, where he graduated in 1952. After serving two years in the military, he began his basketball coaching career in 1955 at Punxsutawney Area High School in Punxsutawney, Pennsylvania.

== College career ==
After compiling a 111–70 record in eight seasons at Punxsutawney High School, Daly moved on to the college level in 1963 as an assistant coach under Vic Bubas at Duke University. During his six seasons at Duke, the Blue Devils won the Atlantic Coast Conference championship and advanced to the Final Four, both in 1964 and 1966. Daly then replaced Bob Cousy as head coach at Boston College in 1969. The Eagles recorded an 11–13 record in Daly's first year at the school, and improved to 15–11 in 1971.

Daly became the head coach at the University of Pennsylvania in 1971, succeeding Dick Harter. Penn won 20 or more games and captured the Ivy League title in each of its first four seasons with Daly at the helm. The most successful campaign was his first in 1972, when the Quakers recorded a 25–3 record overall (13–1 in their conference), and advanced to the NCAA East Regional Final, eventually losing to North Carolina. An additional significant success for Daly was in 1979, when all five starters on Pennsylvania's Final Four team had initially been recruited by Daly. His overall record after six seasons at Penn was 125–38 (74–10 within the Ivy League).

== Coaching career ==
=== Early coaching career ===
Daly began his coaching career at Punxsutawney High School in Pennsylvania, serving as head coach from 1955 to 1963. During his eight seasons at the school, he developed an emphasis on disciplined team defense and structured play that later characterized his professional teams.

In 1963, Daly joined Duke University as an assistant coach under Vic Bubas, serving through the 1968–69 season. His responsibilities included recruiting and player development at the Division I level.

=== Boston College (1969–1971) ===
Daly was named head coach at Boston College in 1969, succeeding Bob Cousy. He served two seasons with the program before departing to become head coach at the University of Pennsylvania.

=== Penn (1971–1977) ===
In 1971, Daly became head coach at the University of Pennsylvania. During his tenure, Penn won multiple Ivy League championships and earned several NCAA Tournament appearances. His success at Penn elevated his national profile and led to opportunities in the National Basketball Association (NBA).

=== Philadelphia 76ers (1978–1981) ===
Daly entered the NBA in 1978 as an assistant coach with the Philadelphia 76ers under head coach Billy Cunningham. He served four seasons in the role, gaining experience managing veteran professional players and adapting his coaching philosophy to the NBA game.

=== Cleveland Cavaliers (1981–1982) ===
Daly was hired as head coach of the Cleveland Cavaliers for the 1981–82 NBA season. He was dismissed during the season as the team struggled, marking a brief but formative first NBA head coaching tenure.

=== Detroit Pistons (1983–1992) ===
Daly became head coach of the Detroit Pistons during the 1983–84 season. Under his leadership, the Pistons emerged as one of the dominant teams of the late 1980s. The team became widely known as the "Bad Boys" due to its physical defensive style and toughness.

Daly led Detroit to three consecutive NBA Finals appearances from 1988 to 1990 and to back-to-back NBA championships in 1989 and 1990. He was recognized for his ability to manage strong personalities, including multiple All-Star players, while maintaining a team-oriented system. His tenure with the Pistons is widely regarded as the defining period of his coaching career.

=== New Jersey Nets (1992–1994) ===
After leaving Detroit, Daly became head coach of the New Jersey Nets in 1992. He coached the team for two seasons, overseeing a transitional roster and emphasizing player development.

=== Orlando Magic (1997–1999) ===
Daly returned to coaching in 1997 as head coach of the Orlando Magic. He remained with the franchise through the 1998–99 season, concluding his NBA head coaching career.

== Death ==
Daly was diagnosed with pancreatic cancer in March 2009 and died on May 9, 2009, at the age of 78. He is buried at Riverside Memorial Park in Tequesta, Florida.

== Head coaching record ==
=== College ===
Record table
Season	Team	Overall	Conference	Standing	Postseason
Boston College Eagles (NCAA University Division independent) (1969–1971)
1969–70	Boston College	11–13			
1970–71	Boston College	15–11			
Boston College:		26–24			
Penn Quakers (Ivy League) (1971–1977)
1971–72	Penn	25–3	13–1	1st	NCAA University Division Third Round
1972–73	Penn	21–7	12–2	1st	NCAA University Division Third Round
1973–74	Penn	21–6	13–1	1st	NCAA Division I First Round
1974–75	Penn	23–5	13–1	1st	NCAA Division I First Round
1975–76	Penn	17–9	11–3	2nd	
1976–77	Penn	18–8	12–2	2nd	
Penn:		125–38	74–10		
Total:		151–62			
National champion Postseason invitational champion Conference regular season champion Conference regular season and conference tournament champion Division regular season champion Division regular season and conference tournament champion Conference tournament champion

=== NBA ===
Legend
Regular season	G	Games coached	W	Games won	L	Games lost	W–L %	Win–loss %
Playoffs	PG	Playoff games	PW	Playoff wins	PL	Playoff losses	PW–L %	Playoff win–loss %

Team	Year	G	W	L	W–L%	Finish	PG	PW	PL	PW–L%	Result
Cleveland	1981–82	41	9	32	.220	(fired)	—	—	—	—	—
Detroit	1983–84	82	49	33	.598	2nd in Central	5	2	3	.400	Lost in first round
Detroit	1984–85	82	46	36	.561	2nd in Central	9	5	4	.556	Lost in Conference semifinals
Detroit	1985–86	82	46	36	.561	3rd in Central	4	1	3	.250	Lost in first round
Detroit	1986–87	82	52	30	.634	2nd in Central	15	10	5	.667	Lost in Conference finals
Detroit	1987–88	82	54	28	.659	1st in Central	23	14	9	.609	Lost in NBA Finals
Detroit	1988–89	82	63	19	.768	1st in Central	17	15	2	.882	Won NBA Championship
Detroit	1989–90	82	59	23	.720	1st in Central	20	15	5	.750	Won NBA Championship
Detroit	1990–91	82	50	32	.610	2nd in Central	15	7	8	.467	Lost in Conference finals
Detroit	1991–92	82	48	34	.585	3rd in Central	5	2	3	.400	Lost in first round
New Jersey	1992–93	82	43	39	.524	3rd in Atlantic	5	2	3	.400	Lost in first round
New Jersey	1993–94	82	45	37	.549	3rd in Atlantic	4	1	3	.250	Lost in first round
Orlando	1997–98	82	41	41	.500	5th in Atlantic	—	—	—	—	Missed playoffs
Orlando	1998–99	50	33	17	.660	1st in Atlantic	4	1	3	.250	Lost in first round
Career		1,075	638	437	.593		126	75	51	.595	

== See also ==
- Michigan Sports Hall of Fame
- List of FIBA AmeriCup winning head coaches
