= 1988–89 NBA season =

43rd NBA season

- League: National Basketball Association
- Sport: Basketball
- Duration: November 4, 1988 – April 23, 1989; April 27 – June 2, 1989 (Playoffs); June 6–13, 1989 (Finals)
- Teams: 25
- TV partner(s): CBS, TBS

Draft
- Top draft pick: Danny Manning
- Picked by: Los Angeles Clippers

Regular season
- Top seed: Detroit Pistons
- Season MVP: Magic Johnson (L.A. Lakers)
- Top scorer: Michael Jordan (Chicago)

Playoffs
- Eastern champions: Detroit Pistons
- Eastern runners-up: Chicago Bulls
- Western champions: Los Angeles Lakers
- Western runners-up: Phoenix Suns

Finals
- Champions: Detroit Pistons
- Runners-up: Los Angeles Lakers
- Finals MVP: Joe Dumars (Detroit)

NBA seasons
- ← 1987–88 1989–90 →

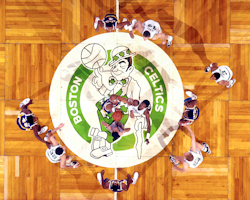
Los Angeles Lakers facing the Boston Celtics in December 1988. This would be Kareem Abdul-Jabbar's last jump ball at Boston Garden.

The 1988–89 NBA season was the 43rd season of the National Basketball Association. The season ended with the Detroit Pistons winning the NBA championship, sweeping the Los Angeles Lakers. This was the first season of the Miami Heat and Charlotte Hornets.

== Notable occurrences ==
Coaching changes
Off-season
Team	1987–88 coach	1988–89 coach
Boston Celtics	K.C. Jones	Jimmy Rodgers
Charlotte Hornets	Expansion	Dick Harter
Houston Rockets	Bill Fitch	Don Chaney
Miami Heat	Expansion	Ron Rothstein
Phoenix Suns	John Wetzel	Cotton Fitzsimmons
San Antonio Spurs	Bob Weiss	Larry Brown
Golden State Warriors	Ed Gregory	Don Nelson
In-season
Team	Outgoing coach	Incoming coach
Portland Trail Blazers	Mike Schuler	Rick Adelman
Los Angeles Clippers	Gene Shue	Don Casey
Indiana Pacers	Jack Ramsay	Mel Daniels
Indiana Pacers	Mel Daniels	George Irvine
Indiana Pacers	George Irvine	Dick Versace
Utah Jazz	Frank Layden	Jerry Sloan

- The NBA adopts the three-official system used in college basketball permanently. The league experimented with three officials per game in 1978–79, but went back to two officials per game for the next nine seasons, although they actually have three with the inclusion of an alternate referee for all playoff games and selected regular season games.
- The Charlotte Hornets and Miami Heat become the league's 24th and 25th franchises.
- The Heat plays its inaugural season in the Midwest Division. As a result, the Sacramento Kings move to the Pacific Division.
- The Hornets play their inaugural season in the Atlantic Division.
- The 1989 NBA All-Star Game was played at the Astrodome in Houston, Texas, with the West defeating the East 143–134. Karl Malone of the Utah Jazz takes home the game's MVP award.
- New Arenas: The Milwaukee Bucks move from the MECCA Arena to the then-Bradley Center, the Sacramento Kings move from ARCO Arena I to the then-ARCO Arena (later Power Balance Pavilion, now Sleep Train Arena), and the Detroit Pistons move from the Pontiac Silverdome to The Palace of Auburn Hills.
- Michael Jordan records ten triple-doubles in eleven games near the end of the season.
- Prior to the season, the first-year Hornets announce that they choose teal as their primary color, which gave them immediate attention. In the next decade, expansion teams in the other professional sports leagues (most notably the San Jose Sharks of the NHL, the Florida Marlins of Major League Baseball's NL, and the Jacksonville Jaguars of the NFL) further popularized the use of the color. The Hornets also popularized the use of pinstripes on the uniforms, which were later adopted by the Orlando Magic, Chicago Bulls (alternates only), Toronto Raptors, Indiana Pacers and the later Charlotte Hornets' predecessor franchise, the second incarnation of the Hornets (formerly known as the Charlotte Bobcats).
- The Chicago Bulls started a playoff tradition by wearing black sneakers. Prior to that, the Boston Celtics were the only team to wear black sneakers. Following the Bulls' unlikely playoff run, other teams began adopting the style, beginning with the Philadelphia 76ers in 1990.
- This was Kareem Abdul-Jabbar's last season.
- The Los Angeles Lakers became the first team to sweep two consecutive best-of-seven series.
- The Celtics, who had never won fewer than 57 games in any of the previous nine seasons, slump to 42 as Larry Bird played only six games due to injuries.
- The Indiana Pacers had four different head coaches during the season, a rare occurrence that has not happened since.
- Seattle SuperSonics guard Dale Ellis won the All-Star game's 3-point shootout.
- The first postponement of an NBA game due to a civil disturbance. In the wake of the Miami riots, the game between the Miami Heat and Phoenix Suns on January 17, 1989, was postponed.
- Utah Jazz coach Frank Layden, citing burnout, resigns from the Jazz after 17 games and an 11–6 record. Assistant Jerry Sloan begins the first season of 23 for the Utah Jazz, at the time of his retirement, the longest tenure of any professional coach for one city and franchise, but since surpassed by Gregg Popovich of the San Antonio Spurs.
- This was the only season for Ricky Berry, who was selected by the Sacramento Kings with the 18th overall pick in the 1988 NBA draft, who committed suicide during the off-season.
- On January 6, 1989, the Bullets franchise played its first regular season game in Baltimore since 1973; this was the first of 35 regular season "home" games the Bullets played in Baltimore through the 1996–97 season.
- Akeem Olajuwon becomes the only player in NBA history to accumulate over 200 steals with over 200 blocks in a season.

== 1988–89 NBA changes ==
- The Detroit Pistons moved into The Palace of Auburn Hills.
- The Los Angeles Clippers changed their jersey number colors on their road uniforms from blue to white.
- The Milwaukee Bucks moved into the Bradley Center (now as BMO Harris Bradley Center).
- The Sacramento Kings moved into ARCO Arena II (now as Sleep Train Arena).
- The Washington Bullets split home games at the Capital Centre and the Baltimore Arena during the season.

== Final standings ==
=== By division ===
Atlantic Division	W	L	PCT	GB	Home	Road	Div
y-New York Knicks	52	30	.634	–	35–6	17–24	18–12
x-Philadelphia 76ers	46	36	.561	6	30–11	16–25	19–11
x-Boston Celtics	42	40	.512	10	32–9	10–31	19–11
Washington Bullets	40	42	.488	12	30–11	10–31	17–13
New Jersey Nets	26	56	.317	26	17–24	9–32	9–21
Charlotte Hornets	20	62	.244	32	12–29	8–33	8–22

Central Division	W	L	PCT	GB	Home	Road	Div
y-Detroit Pistons	63	19	.768	–	37–4	26–15	20–10
x-Cleveland Cavaliers	57	25	.695	6	37–4	20–21	19–11
x-Atlanta Hawks	52	30	.634	11	33–8	19–22	20–10
x-Milwaukee Bucks	49	33	.598	14	31–10	18–23	11–19
x-Chicago Bulls	47	35	.573	16	30–11	17–24	12–18
Indiana Pacers	28	54	.341	35	20–21	8–33	8–22

Midwest Division	W	L	PCT	GB	Home	Road	Div
y-Utah Jazz	51	31	.622	–	34–7	17–24	19–11
x-Houston Rockets	45	37	.549	6	31–10	14–27	19–11
x-Denver Nuggets	44	38	.537	7	35–6	9–32	18–12
Dallas Mavericks	38	44	.463	13	24–17	14–27	19–11
San Antonio Spurs	21	61	.256	30	18–23	3–38	9–21
Miami Heat	15	67	.183	36	12–29	3–38	6–24

Pacific Division	W	L	PCT	GB	Home	Road	Div
y-Los Angeles Lakers	57	25	.695	–	35–6	22–19	25–9
x-Phoenix Suns	55	27	.671	2	35–6	20–21	23–11
x-Seattle SuperSonics	47	35	.573	10	31–10	16–25	20–14
x-Golden State Warriors	43	39	.524	14	29–12	14–27	15–19
x-Portland Trail Blazers	39	43	.476	18	28–13	11–30	17–17
Sacramento Kings	27	55	.329	30	21–20	6–35	12–22
Los Angeles Clippers	21	61	.256	36	17–24	4–37	7–27

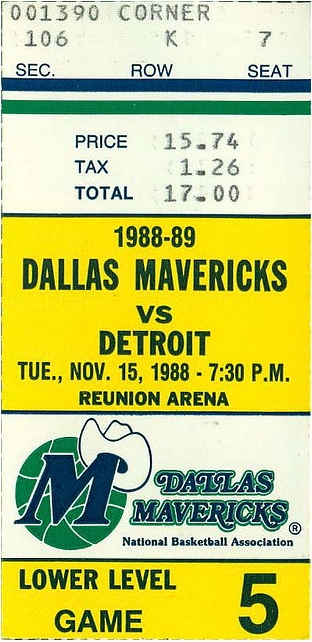
A ticket for a November 1988 game between the Dallas Mavericks and the season's eventual champions Detroit Pistons.

=== By conference ===
#	Eastern Conference				
#	Team	W	L	PCT	GB
1	z-Detroit Pistons	63	19	.768	–
2	y-New York Knicks	52	30	.634	11
3	x-Cleveland Cavaliers	57	25	.695	6
4	x-Atlanta Hawks	52	30	.634	11
5	x-Milwaukee Bucks	49	33	.598	14
6	x-Chicago Bulls	47	35	.573	16
7	x-Philadelphia 76ers	46	36	.561	17
8	x-Boston Celtics	42	40	.512	21
9	Washington Bullets	40	42	.488	23
10	Indiana Pacers	28	54	.341	35
11	New Jersey Nets	26	56	.317	37
12	Charlotte Hornets	20	62	.244	43

#	Western Conference				
#	Team	W	L	PCT	GB
1	c-Los Angeles Lakers	57	25	.695	–
2	y-Utah Jazz	51	31	.622	6
3	x-Phoenix Suns	55	27	.671	2
4	x-Seattle SuperSonics	47	35	.573	10
5	x-Houston Rockets	45	37	.549	12
6	x-Denver Nuggets	44	38	.537	13
7	x-Golden State Warriors	43	39	.524	14
8	x-Portland Trail Blazers	39	43	.476	18
9	Dallas Mavericks	38	44	.463	19
10	Sacramento Kings	27	55	.329	30
11	San Antonio Spurs	21	61	.256	36
12	Los Angeles Clippers	21	61	.256	36
13	Miami Heat	15	67	.183	42

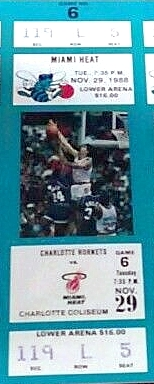
A ticket for a game between the Miami Heat and the Charlotte Hornets during their inaugural season.

Notes

- z – Clinched home court advantage for the entire playoffs
- c – Clinched home court advantage for the conference playoffs
- y – Clinched division title
- x – Clinched playoff spot

== Expansion ==
The League expands from twenty-three to twenty-five franchises, with new expansion teams in Charlotte and Miami.

The Heat began its season as a member of the Western Conference despite its geographical position, enduring its longest road trips when playing Western Conference teams. It also began the season 0–17, at the time the worst start in NBA history. The Hornets finished at 20–62. Such records are typical of expansion NBA franchises in their initial seasons, with 15–67 being the poorest record repeated by the Cavaliers, Grizzlies, Rockets, and Mavericks, as well as the Heat. The Sacramento Kings were belatedly moved to the Pacific Division in their fourth season after leaving Kansas City.

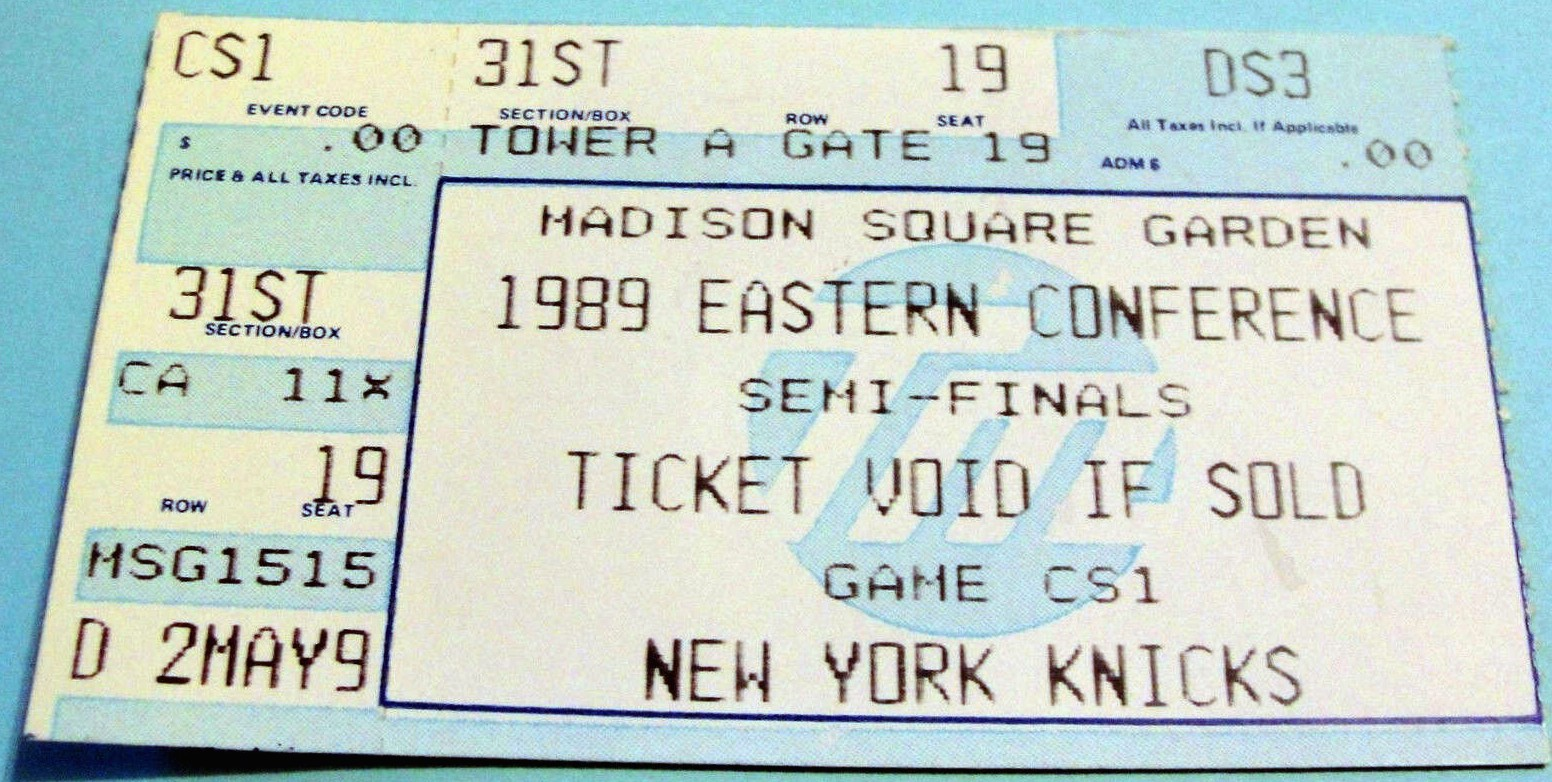
A ticket for Game 1 of the 1989 Eastern Conference Semifinals between the New York Knicks and the Chicago Bulls.

== Playoffs ==
Teams in bold advanced to the next round. The numbers to the left of each team indicate the team's seeding in its conference, and the numbers to the right indicate the number of games the team won in that round. The division champions are marked by an asterisk. Home court advantage does not necessarily belong to the higher-seeded team, but instead the team with the better regular season record; teams enjoying the home advantage are shown in italics.

First Round	Conference Semifinals
**E1**	**Detroit***	**3**
E8	Boston	0
**E1**	**Detroit***	**4**
E5	Milwaukee	0
E4	Atlanta	2
**E5**	**Milwaukee**	**3**
**Eastern Conference**
E3	Cleveland	2
**E6**	**Chicago**	**3**
**E6**	**Chicago**	**4**
E2	New York*	2
**E2**	**New York***	**3**
E7	Philadelphia	0
**W1**	**LA Lakers***	**3**
W8	Portland	0
**W1**	**LA Lakers***	**4**
W4	Seattle	0
**W4**	**Seattle**	**3**
W5	Houston	1
**Western Conference**
**W3**	**Phoenix**	**3**
W6	Denver	0
**W3**	**Phoenix**	**4**
W7	Golden State	1
W2	Utah*	0
**W7**	**Golden State**	**3**

Conference Finals
**E1**	**Detroit***	**4**
E6	Chicago	2
**W1**	**LA Lakers***	**4**
W3	Phoenix	0

NBA Finals
**E1**	**Detroit***	**4**
W1	LA Lakers*	0

- * Division winner
- **Bold** Series winner
- Italic Team with home-court advantage

== Statistics leaders ==
Category	Player	Team	Stat
Points per game	Michael Jordan	Chicago Bulls	32.5
Rebounds per game	Akeem Olajuwon	Houston Rockets	13.5
Assists per game	John Stockton	Utah Jazz	13.6
Steals per game	John Stockton	Utah Jazz	3.21
Blocks per game	Manute Bol	Golden State Warriors	4.31
FG%	Dennis Rodman	Detroit Pistons	.595
FT%	Magic Johnson	Los Angeles Lakers	.911
3FG%	Jon Sundvold	Miami Heat	.522

== NBA awards ==
- Most Valuable Player: Magic Johnson, Los Angeles Lakers
- Rookie of the Year: Mitch Richmond, Golden State Warriors
- Defensive Player of the Year: Mark Eaton, Utah Jazz
- Sixth Man of the Year: Eddie Johnson, Phoenix Suns
- Most Improved Player: Kevin Johnson, Phoenix Suns
- Coach of the Year: Cotton Fitzsimmons, Phoenix Suns

- All-NBA First Team:
  - F – Karl Malone, Utah Jazz
  - F – Charles Barkley, Philadelphia 76ers
  - C – Akeem Olajuwon, Houston Rockets
  - G – Michael Jordan, Chicago Bulls
  - G – Magic Johnson, Los Angeles Lakers
- All-NBA Second Team:
  - F – Tom Chambers, Phoenix Suns
  - F – Chris Mullin, Golden State Warriors
  - C – Patrick Ewing, New York Knicks
  - G – John Stockton, Utah Jazz
  - G – Kevin Johnson, Phoenix Suns
- All-NBA Third Team:
  - F – Dominique Wilkins, Atlanta Hawks
  - F – Terry Cummings, Milwaukee Bucks
  - C – Robert Parish, Boston Celtics
  - G – Dale Ellis, Seattle SuperSonics
  - G – Mark Price, Cleveland Cavaliers

- NBA All-Rookie First Team:
  - Rik Smits, Indiana Pacers
  - Willie Anderson, San Antonio Spurs
  - Mitch Richmond, Golden State Warriors
  - Charles D. Smith, Los Angeles Clippers
  - Hersey Hawkins, Philadelphia 76ers
- NBA All-Rookie Second Team:
  - Rex Chapman, Charlotte Hornets
  - Kevin Edwards, Miami Heat
  - Chris Morris, New Jersey Nets
  - Brian Shaw, Boston Celtics
  - Rod Strickland, New York Knicks

- NBA All-Defensive First Team:
  - Dennis Rodman, Detroit Pistons
  - Larry Nance, Cleveland Cavaliers
  - Mark Eaton, Utah Jazz
  - Michael Jordan, Chicago Bulls
  - Joe Dumars, Detroit Pistons
- NBA All-Defensive Second Team:
  - Kevin McHale, Boston Celtics
  - A.C. Green, Los Angeles Lakers
  - Patrick Ewing, New York Knicks
  - John Stockton, Utah Jazz
  - Alvin Robertson, San Antonio Spurs

=== Player of the week ===
The following players were named NBA Player of the Week.

Week	Player
Nov. 4 – Nov. 13	Akeem Olajuwon (Houston Rockets)
Nov. 14 – Nov. 20	Michael Jordan (Chicago Bulls)
Nov. 21 – Nov. 27	Patrick Ewing (New York Knicks)
Nov. 28 – Dec. 4	Magic Johnson (Los Angeles Lakers)
Dec. 5 – Dec. 11	Michael Adams (Denver Nuggets)
Dec. 12 – Dec. 18	Robert Parish (Boston Celtics)
Dec. 20 – Dec. 25	Clyde Drexler (Portland Trail Blazers)
Dec. 26 – Dec. 30	Magic Johnson (Los Angeles Lakers)
Jan. 2 – Jan. 8	Dale Ellis (Seattle SuperSonics)
Jan. 9 – Jan. 15	Michael Jordan (Chicago Bulls)
Jan. 16 – Jan. 22	Chris Mullin (Golden State Warriors)
Jan. 23 – Jan. 29	Tom Chambers (Phoenix Suns)
Jan. 30 – Feb. 5	Ron Harper (Cleveland Cavaliers)
Feb. 6 – Feb. 19	Akeem Olajuwon (Houston Rockets)
Feb. 20 – Feb. 26	Patrick Ewing (New York Knicks)
Feb. 27 – Mar. 5	Chuck Person (Indiana Pacers)
Mar. 6 – Mar. 12	Isiah Thomas (Detroit Pistons)
Mar. 13 – Mar. 19	Kevin Johnson (Phoenix Suns)
Mar. 20 – Mar. 26	Michael Jordan (Chicago Bulls)
Mar. 27 – Apr. 2	Michael Jordan (Chicago Bulls)
Apr. 3 – Apr. 9	Clyde Drexler (Portland Trail Blazers)
Apr. 10 – Apr. 16	Karl Malone (Utah Jazz)
Apr. 17 – Apr. 23	Xavier McDaniel (Seattle SuperSonics)

=== Player of the month ===
The following players were named NBA Player of the Month.

Month	Player
November	Charles Barkley (Philadelphia 76ers)
December	Michael Jordan (Chicago Bulls)
January	Chris Mullin (Golden State Warriors)
February	Kevin Johnson (Phoenix Suns)
March	Michael Jordan (Chicago Bulls)
April	Patrick Ewing (New York Knicks)

=== Rookie of the month ===
The following players were named NBA Rookie of the Month.

Month	Rookie
November	Willie Anderson (San Antonio Spurs)
December	Mitch Richmond (Golden State Warriors)
January	Mitch Richmond (Golden State Warriors)
February	Charles Smith (Los Angeles Clippers)
March	Mitch Richmond (Golden State Warriors)
April	Charles Smith (Los Angeles Clippers)

=== Coach of the month ===
The following coaches were named NBA Coach of the Month.

Month	Coach
November	Chuck Daly (Detroit Pistons)
December	Lenny Wilkens (Cleveland Cavaliers)
January	Del Harris (Milwaukee Bucks)
February	Don Nelson (Golden State Warriors)
March	Chuck Daly (Detroit Pistons)
April	Cotton Fitzsimmons (Phoenix Suns)

== See also ==
- List of NBA regular season records
