= Steve Stipanovich =

American basketball player (born 1960)

Personal information
- Born: November 17, 1960 (age 65) St. Louis, Missouri, U.S.
- Listed height: 6 ft 11 in (2.11 m)
- Listed weight: 245 lb (111 kg)

Career information
- High school: De Smet Jesuit (Creve Coeur, Missouri)
- College: Missouri (1979–1983)
- NBA draft: 1983: 1st round, 2nd overall pick
- Drafted by: Indiana Pacers
- Playing career: 1983–1988
- Position: Center
- Number: 40

Career history
- 1983–1988: Indiana Pacers

Career highlights
- NBA All-Rookie First Team (1984); Consensus second-team All-American (1983); Big Eight co-Player of the Year (1983); No. 40 retired by Missouri Tigers; First-team Parade All-American (1979); McDonald's All-American (1979)

Career NBA statistics
- Points: 5,323 (13.2 ppg)
- Rebounds: 3,131 (7.8 rpg)
- Assists: 938 (2.3 apg)
- Stats at NBA.com
- Stats at Basketball Reference

Stephen Samuel Stipanovich (born November 17, 1960) is an American former professional basketball player. A 6 ft 11 in (2.11 m) center who played college basketball for the Missouri Tigers between 1979 and 1983, he and Jon Sundvold helped coach Norm Stewart to four consecutive Big Eight Conference championships and NCAA tournament appearances. Stipanovich was selected by the Indiana Pacers with the second pick of the 1983 NBA draft, which remains the highest a Missouri player has been picked in the NBA draft in school history. Knee problems limited his career to five seasons, and he retired in 1988 with career totals of 5,323 points and 3,131 rebounds.

== Early life ==
Stephen Samuel "Stipo" Stipanovich, son of Sam and Elaine (née Ortmann) Stipanovich, was born and raised in the St. Louis, Missouri, area. Sam Stipanovich co-owned a funeral home with his father-in-law, Al C. Ortmann, that is still in operation today.

Stipanovich is of Serbian and Croatian descent. His paternal grandmother Sadie was the daughter of Simo Visnic from Serbia and Milica Mamula from Karlovac, Croatia. Sadie married Theodore Stipanovic, whose family came from the same region. Visnic had come to the US in 1905.

== High school career ==
After attending Chaminade College Prep as a freshman, Stipanovich transferred to De Smet Jesuit High School in suburban Creve Coeur, Missouri.

While a member of the De Smet Spartans, Stipanovich led them to back-to-back Missouri Class 4A State Championships and a sixty-game winning streak under coach Rich Grawer.

Coach "Grawer worked with me, and helped me develop the fundamental skills of basketball," Stipanovich reflected. "By the time I was a senior, I was one of the most heavily recruited basketball players in the NCAA in 1979."

In February 1979, Sports Illustrated magazine ranked Stipanovich with Sam Bowie and Ralph Sampson as the nation's best high school centers.

Stipanovich played in the 1979 McDonald's All-American Game. The memorable rosters included: Sam Bowie, Antoine Carr, Quintin Dailey, Sidney Green, Clark Kellogg, Greg Kite, Sidney Lowe, John Paxson, Ralph Sampson, Byron Scott, Isiah Thomas, Dereck Whittenburg, Dominique Wilkins and James Worthy.

== College career ==
Stipanovich chose to attend the University of Missouri under coach Norm Stewart, after numerous colleges recruited him, including Notre Dame, Duke, St. Louis, Kentucky and North Carolina.

In 1979–80 he was named Big Eight Newcomer of the Year as a freshman, averaging 14.4 points and 6.4 rebounds on 59% shooting. The Tigers finished 25–8, advancing to the sweet sixteen of the 1980 NCAA Division I Basketball Tournament.

“My favorite memory at Mizzou was during my freshman year in the NCAA tournament,” Stipanovich recalled. “In the tournament we played Notre Dame, a school which was considerably stronger than Mizzou. We were the underdogs, and yet we won the game. It was amazing.”

As a sophomore in 1980–81, Missouri finished 22–10 and captured their 2nd successive Big 8 Conference Championship, as Stipanovich averaged 12.7 points, 7.4 rebounds and 1.8 assists.

In 1981–82, Missouri finished 27–4, capturing the Big 8 Title, with Stipanovich averaging 16.1 points, 6.5 rebounds and 1.9 assists. The Tigers lost 79–78 to Houston with Clyde Drexler and Akeem Olajuwon in the 2nd round of the 1982 NCAA Division I men's basketball tournament.

As a senior in 1982–83, Stipanovich averaged 18.4 points and 8.8 rebounds, and dominated the Big Eight Conference. In a nationally televised game, Stipanovich and teammate Greg Cavener combined to stop future NBA number one pick Ralph Sampson and upset top ranked Virginia, as Stipanovich scored 27 points with 12 rebounds and 5 blocked shots. Stipanovich was both an academic All American and a first team All American selection his senior year. Missouri finished 26–8 and won their fourth straight Big 8 conference title.

Missouri won over 100 games and Stipanovich averaged 14.3 points, 7.7 rebounds and 1.8 assists in 128 career games at Missouri. He played all four years alongside teammate and future NBA player Jon Sundvold.

=== Gunshot controversy ===
On the evening of December 27, 1980, Stipanovich accidentally discharged a loaded firearm, hitting himself in the shoulder. He initially told police that a masked intruder, wearing cowboy boots and a flannel shirt broke into his apartment on Sunrise Drive in Columbia, Missouri, and shot him while screaming obscenities about basketball players. The next day, Stipanovich recanted the story and admitted that he shot himself by accident. Regarding the incident afterward, Stipanovich stated, "That gun incident changed my life. Absolutely. It was in the past, and I had to look to the future. I mean, you can't unscramble eggs."

== NBA career ==
On May 19, 1983, the Houston Rockets won a coin flip with the Indiana Pacers for the first pick in the 1983 NBA draft. The Rockets chose Virginia's Ralph Sampson on draft day, June 28, 1983.

Stipanovich was taken by the Pacers with the second overall pick of the 1983 NBA draft, behind Sampson. "People kept telling me I'd be the second pick," Stipanovich reflected. "I didn't really know for sure." The Pacers teamed Stipanovich, with 6 ft 11 in (2.11 m) Herb Williams and 6 ft 7 in (2.01 m) Clark Kellogg, their first-round pick in 1982.

Stipanovich averaged 12.0 points and 6.9 rebounds en route to earning NBA All-Rookie Team honors in 1983–84 under coach George Irvine. "Stipo" would remain a fixture in the Pacers' starting lineup the next five seasons. From 1984 to 1988, Stipanovich averaged 13 points and 6 rebounds, while starting 292 of his 322 games. Stipanovich scored at least 20 points in 62 times and never missed more than three games in his five years.

On October 20, 1985, Stipanovich and Patrick Ewing of the New York Knicks were involved in a scuffle that left Ewing with an injured elbow and his arm in a sling. Ewing had elbowed Stipanovich in the face. Later, Stipanovich threw Ewing to the floor and jumped on him. Both team benches emptied, and the two had to be restrained from going after one another again. Ewing was fined $1500 and Stipanovich $750. Both were fined $250 for being ejected.

After four consecutive last–place finishes in 1983–1986, the Pacers made the 1987 NBA playoffs, with a 41–41 record. Stipanovich averaged 13.2 points, 8.3 rebounds, 2.2 assists, 1.3 steals and 1.2 blocks under new coach Jack Ramsay. Playing alongside Chuck Person, Wayman Tisdale, Herb Williams, Clark Kellogg, Vern Fleming and John Long, it was the franchise's second postseason appearance since merging into the NBA in 1976. Stipanovich scored a team-high 22 points with 13 rebounds in a Game 1 loss at the Atlanta Hawks. He averaged 13.8 points and 7.5 rebounds in the series, as the Pacers won their first ever NBA playoff game in Game 3, but ultimately lost the series in four games.

Stipanovich played only one more season after the playoff trip, as the Pacers finished 38–44 in 1987–1988, with Stipanovich averaging 13.5 points, 8.3 rebounds, 2.3 assists and 1.1 steals, playing 80 games in his final season.

Stipanovich missed the entire 1988–89 campaign due to a degenerative knee condition that didn't improve after surgery in November 1988. At the time, then Pacers General Manager Donnie Walsh called him the "fifth or sixth-best center in the league" and praised him for "holding his own against the best".

Stipanovich was forced to retire in 1989, at age 28, due to a dead spot in the bone of his left knee. Stipanovich said the injury was so bad he "can't even cut the grass".

For his five–season NBA career, Stipanovich averaged 13.2 points, 7.8 rebounds, 2.3 assists and 1.0 steals in 403 career games. Stipanovich shot 48.4% from the field and 79.6% from the line.

“The coaches who have worked with me pushed me beyond what I thought I could achieve”, Stipanovich said. “They took the time to teach me the fundamentals of basketball.”

== Personal life ==
Stipanovich and his wife Terri have six children, Katie, Kelli, Sadie, Hannah, Emma, and Luke.

In 1980, Stipanovich accidentally shot himself in the shoulder while cleaning his gun. He then told police a masked intruder had shot him. The next day he acknowledged his lie. He faced no criminal charges for the incident.

Stipanovich has undergone 13 surgeries, including six on his left knee and four shoulder operations since his retirement.

Following his retirement from the NBA Stipanovich worked in real estate sales in Oregon. He eventually returned to the St. Louis area where he is the owner/operator of a coal mine.

Stipanovich was girls basketball head coach at Westminster Academy, leading the team to a 65–20 record over three seasons. “I just love coaching and being around my kids,” Stipanovich said. Two of his daughters played for him.

== NBA career statistics ==
Legend
GP	Games played	GS	Games started	MPG	Minutes per game
FG%	Field goal percentage	3P%	3-point field goal percentage	FT%	Free throw percentage
RPG	Rebounds per game	APG	Assists per game	SPG	Steals per game
BPG	Blocks per game	PPG	Points per game	**Bold**	Career high

=== Regular season ===
Year	Team	GP	GS	MPG	FG%	3P%	FT%	RPG	APG	SPG	BPG	PPG
1983–84	Indiana	81	73	30.0	.480	.188	.753	6.9	2.1	0.9	0.8	12.0
1984–85	Indiana	**82**	66	28.2	.475	.091	.798	7.5	2.4	0.9	1.0	**13.7**
1985–86	Indiana	79	65	30.3	.470	.200	.768	7.9	**2.6**	0.9	0.9	13.6
1986–87	Indiana	81	**81**	**34.1**	**.503**	**.250**	**.837**	**8.3**	2.2	**1.3**	**1.2**	13.2
1987–88	Indiana	80	80	33.7	.496	.200	.809	**8.3**	2.3	1.1	0.9	13.5
Career		403	365	31.2	.484	.179	.796	7.8	2.3	1.0	0.9	13.2

=== Playoffs ===
Year	Team	GP	GS	MPG	FG%	3P%	FT%	RPG	APG	SPG	BPG	PPG
1987	Indiana	4	4	37.3	.553	.000	.684	7.5	0.8	0.8	0.5	13.8
Career		4	4	37.3	.553	.000	.684	7.5	0.8	0.8	0.5	13.8

== Honors ==
- Stipanovich was selected to the Mizzou Hall of Fame in 1990.
- Stipanovich's #40 jersey was retired by Missouri.
- Stipanovich was selected to the St. Louis Sports Hall of Fame.
- In 1999, Sports Illustrated listed Stipanovich in "The 50 Greatest Sports Figures from Missouri."
- In 2001, Stipanovich was inducted into the Missouri Sports Hall of Fame.
- In 2009, Stipanovich and Jon Sundvold were chosen as co-grand marshals of the Mizzou Homecoming Parade.
