= 1986–87 Philadelphia 76ers season =

NBA professional basketball team season

- Head coach: Matt Guokas
- Arena: The Spectrum

Results
- Record: 45–37 (.549)
- Place: Division: 2nd (Atlantic); Conference: 5th (Eastern)
- Playoff finish: First round (lost to Bucks 2–3)
- Stats at Basketball Reference

Local media
- Television: WPHL-TV; PRISM
- Radio: WIP

The 1986–87 Philadelphia 76ers season was the 76ers 38th season in the NBA and 24th season in Philadelphia. At the 1986 Draft, the Sixers made two trades that would cloud the franchise for over a decade. The Sixers traded the Number 1 overall pick to the Cleveland Cavaliers (who used this to draft Brad Daugherty), for Roy Hinson and cash. They also traded Moses Malone, Terry Catledge, and two first round draft picks to the Washington Bullets for Jeff Ruland and Cliff Robinson.

Brad Daugherty would have multiple All-Star selections with the Cavs, while Hinson was dealt away after having a short, unremarkable career (less than 1 and 1/2 years) in Philadelphia. Malone would go to the 1987 NBA All Star game, and Jeff Ruland played in a total of 5 games that season, before sustaining an injury that would keep him out of the NBA until a short stint with the Sixers in the 1992 season.

These two trades were so devastating in that, with the exception of the 2001 season in which they won the Eastern Conference Championship, they have not been considered an elite franchise since, after being one for a period from 1977 to that point. As of 2026, they have won just three division titles after this trade (1990, 2001, 2021), and have only appeared in one Eastern Conference Final series (2001).

The Sixers would finish nine games worse than the previous season at 45–37, and lose in the first round of the playoffs to the Milwaukee Bucks. This would be the 16th and final season for Julius Erving, who in his last regular season home game, became just the third player in ABA-NBA history to score over 30,000 points for a career. Each road city had a farewell ceremony to honor him.

== Draft picks ==
Round	Pick	Player	Position	Nationality	College
2	44	David Wingate	SG/SF	United States	Georgetown
3	56	Keith Colbert		United States	Virginia Polytech
3	67	Ron Rowan	SF	United States	St. John's
4	90	Wes Stallings		United States	East Tennessee State
5	113	Kevin Holmes		United States	DePaul
6	136	Andre McCloud		United States	Seton Hall
7	159	Dan Palombizio		United States	Ball State

== Roster ==
1986–87 Philadelphia 76ers roster
Players

Pos.	No.	Player	Height	Weight	DOB	From
F	34	Charles Barkley	6 ft 6 in (1.98 m)	252 lb (114 kg)	1963–02–20	Auburn
G	10	Maurice Cheeks	6 ft 1 in (1.85 m)	180 lb (82 kg)	1956–09–08	West Texas A&M
G	14	Steve Colter	6 ft 3 in (1.91 m)	165 lb (75 kg)	1962–07–24	New Mexico State
F	6	Julius Erving	6 ft 6 in (1.98 m)	210 lb (95 kg)	1950-02-22	UMass
F	21	Kenny Green	6 ft 6 in (1.98 m)	210 lb (95 kg)	1964–10–11	Wake Forest
F	23	Roy Hinson	6 ft 9 in (2.06 m)	210 lb (95 kg)	1961–05–02	Rutgers
C	40	Tim McCormick	6 ft 11 in (2.11 m)	240 lb (109 kg)	1956–01–16	Michigan
C	31	Mark McNamara	6 ft 11 in (2.11 m)	235 lb (107 kg)	1959–06–08	California
F	4	Cliff Robinson	6 ft 9 in (2.06 m)	220 lb (100 kg)	1960–03–13	USC
C	43	Jeff Ruland	6 ft 10 in (2.08 m)	240 lb (109 kg)	1962–07–10	Iona
G	22	Andrew Toney	6 ft 3 in (1.91 m)	178 lb (81 kg)	1957-11-23	Louisiana
F	20	Danny Vranes	6 ft 7 in (2.01 m)	210 lb (95 kg)	1958–10–29	Utah
G/F	25	David Wingate	6 ft 5 in (1.96 m)	185 lb (84 kg)	1963–12–15	Georgetown

Coaches
Head coach
- Matt Guokas

Legend
- (DP) Unsigned draft pick
- (FA) Free agent
- (S) Suspended
- Injured

== Regular season ==
=== Season standings ===
Atlantic Division	W	L	PCT	GB	Home	Road	Div
y-Boston Celtics	59	23	.720	–	39–2	20–21	15–9
x-Philadelphia 76ers	45	37	.549	14	28–13	17–24	12–12
x-Washington Bullets	42	40	.512	17	27–14	15–26	13–11
New Jersey Nets	24	58	.293	35	19–22	5–36	12–12
New York Knicks	24	58	.293	35	18–23	6–35	8–16

#	Eastern Conference				
#	Team	W	L	PCT	GB
1	c-Boston Celtics	59	23	.720	–
2	y-Atlanta Hawks	57	25	.695	2
3	x-Detroit Pistons	52	30	.634	7
4	x-Milwaukee Bucks	50	32	.610	9
5	x-Philadelphia 76ers	45	37	.549	14
6	x-Washington Bullets	42	40	.512	17
7	x-Indiana Pacers	41	41	.500	18
8	x-Chicago Bulls	40	42	.488	19
9	Cleveland Cavaliers	31	51	.378	28
10	New Jersey Nets	24	58	.293	35
11	New York Knicks	24	58	.293	35

z - clinched division title
y - clinched division title
x - clinched playoff spot

== Game log ==
=== Regular season ===
1986–87 game log
Total: 45–37 (Home: 28–13; Road: 17–24)
October: 1–0 (home: 1–0; road: 0–0)

Game	Date	Team	Score	High points	High rebounds	High assists	Location Attendance	Record

November: 9–7 (home: 6–2; road: 3–5)

Game	Date	Team	Score	High points	High rebounds	High assists	Location Attendance	Record
14	November 25	Boston	W 102–100				The Spectrum	9–5

December: 6–9 (home: 4–4; road: 2–5)

Game	Date	Team	Score	High points	High rebounds	High assists	Location Attendance	Record
17	December 5	@ Boston	L 106–108				Boston Garden	11–6
24	December 19	Boston	W 122–100				The Spectrum	14–10
29	December 28	@ L.A. Lakers	L 85–111				The Forum; 17,505	15–14

January: 10–5 (home: 6–1; road: 4–4)

Game	Date	Team	Score	High points	High rebounds	High assists	Location Attendance	Record
41	January 25	@ Boston	L 96–111				Boston Garden	23–18

February: 5–7 (home: 2–2; road: 3–5)

Game	Date	Team	Score	High points	High rebounds	High assists	Location Attendance	Record
All-Star Break
54	February 22	L.A. Lakers	L 110–112 (OT)				The Spectrum; 17,967	31–23

March: 9–6 (home: 5–3; road: 4–3)

Game	Date	Team	Score	High points	High rebounds	High assists	Location Attendance	Record
71	March 29	@ Boston	L 100–118				Boston Garden	39–32

April: 5–5 (home: 4–1; road: 1–4)

Game	Date	Team	Score	High points	High rebounds	High assists	Location Attendance	Record
75	April 5	Boston	W 106–104 (OT)				The Spectrum	42–33

1986–87 schedule

== Playoffs ==
1987 playoff game log
First Round: 2–3 (home: 1–1; road: 1–2)

Game	Date	Team	Score	High points	High rebounds	High assists	Location Attendance	Series
1	April 24	@ Milwaukee	L 104–107	Charles Barkley (21)	Charles Barkley (13)	Cheeks, Toney (9)	MECCA Arena; 11,052	0–1
2	April 26	@ Milwaukee	W 125–122 (OT)	Roy Hinson (28)	Charles Barkley (15)	Maurice Cheeks (11)	MECCA Arena; 11,052	1–1
3	April 29	Milwaukee	L 120–121	Charles Barkley (39)	Cliff Robinson (10)	Cheeks, Toney (8)	The Spectrum; 14,361	1–2
4	May 1	Milwaukee	W 124–118	Charles Barkley (25)	Charles Barkley (13)	Maurice Cheeks (11)	The Spectrum; 15,464	2–2
5	May 3	@ Milwaukee	L 89–102	Julius Erving (24)	Charles Barkley (13)	Cheeks, Wingate (5)	MECCA Arena; 11,052	2–3

1987 schedule

== Player statistics ==
Legend
GP	Games played	GS	Games started	MPG	Minutes per game
FG%	Field-goal percentage	3P%	3-point field-goal percentage	FT%	Free-throw percentage
RPG	Rebounds per game	APG	Assists per game	SPG	Steals per game
BPG	Blocks per game	PPG	Points per game

== Awards and records ==
- Charles Barkley, All-NBA Second Team
- Maurice Cheeks, NBA All-Defensive Second Team

== See also ==
- 1986-87 NBA season
