= 1986–87 Indiana Pacers season =

NBA professional basketball team season

- Head coach: Jack Ramsay
- General manager: Donnie Walsh
- Arena: Market Square Arena

Results
- Record: 41–41 (.500)
- Place: Division: 4th (Central); Conference: 7th (Eastern)
- Playoff finish: Lost to Atlanta Hawks in East First Round (1-3)
- Stats at Basketball Reference

Local media
- Television: WTTV–TV 4 (Eddie Doucette, Bobby "Slick" Leonard)
- Radio: WIBC–AM 1070 (Greg Papa)

The 1986–87 Indiana Pacers season was Indiana's 11th season in the NBA and 20th season as a franchise.

The Pacers would finish with only their second .500 or better season in the NBA (at 41–41) and make their second-ever postseason appearance as an NBA franchise, losing the opening round 3–1 in a five-game series to the Atlanta Hawks.

== Offseason ==
=== Draft picks ===
This table only lists picks through the second round.

Round	Pick	Player	Position	Nationality	College
1	4	Chuck Person	SF	United States	Auburn
2	26	Greg Dreiling	C	United States	Kansas

== Roster ==
Indiana Pacers roster
Players

Pos.	No.	Player	Height	Weight	DOB	From
SF	15	Ron Anderson	6 ft 7 in (2.01 m)	215 lb (98 kg)		Fresno State
C	54	Greg Dreiling	7 ft 1 in (2.16 m)	250 lb (113 kg)		Kansas
PG	10	Vern Fleming	6 ft 5 in (1.96 m)	185 lb (84 kg)		Georgia
C	55	Stuart Gray	7 ft 0 in (2.13 m)	235 lb (107 kg)		UCLA
PF	33	Clark Kellogg (injured)	6 ft 7 in (2.01 m)	225 lb (102 kg)		Ohio State
SG	25	John Long	6 ft 5 in (1.96 m)	195 lb (88 kg)		Detroit Mercy
G	44	Kyle Macy	6 ft 3 in (1.91 m)	175 lb (79 kg)		Kentucky
SF	45	Chuck Person	6 ft 8 in (2.03 m)	220 lb (100 kg)		Auburn
SG	4	Clint Richardson	6 ft 3 in (1.91 m)	195 lb (88 kg)		Seattle
PG	31	Walker Russell	6 ft 5 in (1.96 m)	195 lb (88 kg)		Western Michigan
C	40	Steve Stipanovich	6 ft 11 in (2.11 m)	245 lb (111 kg)		Missouri
PF	23	Wayman Tisdale	6 ft 9 in (2.06 m)	240 lb (109 kg)		Oklahoma
PF	32	Herb Williams	6 ft 10 in (2.08 m)	242 lb (110 kg)		Ohio State

Coaches
Head coach
- Jack Ramsay
Assistant(s)
- Mel Daniels
- Dick Harter
- Dave Twardzik

Legend
- (DP) Unsigned draft pick
- (FA) Free agent
- (S) Suspended
- Injured

== Regular season ==
=== Season standings ===
Central Division	W	L	PCT	GB	Home	Road	Div
y-Atlanta Hawks	57	25	.695	–	35–6	22–19	17–13
x-Detroit Pistons	52	30	.634	5	32–9	20–21	17–13
x-Milwaukee Bucks	50	32	.610	7	32–9	18–23	17–13
x-Indiana Pacers	41	41	.500	16	28–13	13–28	13–16
x-Chicago Bulls	40	42	.488	17	29–12	11–30	17–12
Cleveland Cavaliers	31	51	.378	26	25–16	6–35	8–22

#	Eastern Conference				
#	Team	W	L	PCT	GB
1	c-Boston Celtics	59	23	.720	–
2	y-Atlanta Hawks	57	25	.695	2
3	x-Detroit Pistons	52	30	.634	7
4	x-Milwaukee Bucks	50	32	.610	9
5	x-Philadelphia 76ers	45	37	.549	14
6	x-Washington Bullets	42	40	.512	17
7	x-Indiana Pacers	41	41	.500	18
8	x-Chicago Bulls	40	42	.488	19
9	Cleveland Cavaliers	31	51	.378	28
10	New Jersey Nets	24	58	.293	35
11	New York Knicks	24	58	.293	35

z - clinched division title
y - clinched division title
x - clinched playoff spot

== Game log ==
=== Regular season ===
1986–87 game log
Total: 41–41 (Home: 28–13; Road: 13–28)
October: 0–1 (home: 0–0; road: 0–1)

Game	Date	Team	Score	High points	High rebounds	High assists	Location Attendance	Record
1	October 31	@ Philadelphia	L 104–108				The Spectrum	0–1

November: 7–8 (home: 5–2; road: 2–6)

Game	Date	Team	Score	High points	High rebounds	High assists	Location Attendance	Record
2	November 1; 7:30 p.m. EST	Detroit	W 92–89	Long (23)	Williams (10)	Williams (14)	Market Square Arena; 16,912	1–1
3	November 4	Philadelphia	W 125–121 (2OT)				Market Square Arena	2–1
4	November 5; 7:30 p.m. EST	@ Boston	L 102–133	Russell (16)	Williams (10)	Long, Russell (4)	Boston Garden; 14,890	2–2
5	November 8	San Antonio	W 130–97				Market Square Arena	3–2
6	November 11	@ Milwaukee	L 94–102				MECCA Arena	3–3
7	November 13	@ New Jersey	W 120–117				Brendan Byrne Arena	4–3
8	November 15	Milwaukee	W 104–103				Market Square Arena	5–3
9	November 16	@ Washington	L 111–124				Capital Centre	5–4
10	November 18	@ L.A. Clippers	W 98–93				Los Angeles Memorial Sports Arena	6–4
11	November 20	@ Sacramento	L 83–92				ARCO Arena	6–5
12	November 22; 10:30 p.m. EST	@ Seattle	L 111–121	Williams (32)	Person (9)	Fleming (8)	Seattle Center Coliseum; 6,399	6–6
13	November 23	@ Portland	L 95–108				Memorial Coliseum	6–7
14	November 26	Houston	L 88–92				Market Square Arena	6–8
15	November 28	Denver	W 126–102				Market Square Arena	7–8
16	November 30	Portland	L 101–118				Market Square Arena	7–9

December: 7–6 (home: 6–1; road: 1–5)

Game	Date	Team	Score	High points	High rebounds	High assists	Location Attendance	Record
17	December 2	@ Milwaukee	L 88–95				MECCA Arena	7–10
18	December 3	Washington	W 116–103				Market Square Arena	8–10
19	December 5	Atlanta	W 119–113				Market Square Arena	9–10
20	December 10	@ Philadelphia	L 112–122				The Spectrum	9–11
21	December 11	Cleveland	W 115–94				Market Square Arena	10–11
22	December 13	New Jersey	W 95–91				Market Square Arena	11–11
23	December 17; 7:30 p.m. EST	@ Boston	L 101–113	Fleming. Person (21)	Williams (10)	Fleming, Person, Stipanovich (6)	Boston Garden; 14,890	11–12
24	December 18	Chicago	L 88–97				Market Square Arena	11–13
25	December 20	@ New York	W 123–99				Madison Square Garden	12–13
26	December 21	@ Cleveland	L 94–104				Richfield Coliseum	12–14
27	December 23; 5:30 p.m. EST	Detroit	W 111–98	Stipanovich (29)	Stipanovich (10)	Fleming (11)	Market Square Arena; 11,860	13–14
28	December 27	@ Chicago	L 93–105				Chicago Stadium	13–15
29	December 30	Cleveland	W 111–99				Market Square Arena	14–15

January: 6–9 (home: 4–4; road: 2–5)

Game	Date	Team	Score	High points	High rebounds	High assists	Location Attendance	Record
30	January 2	L.A. Clippers	W 116–106				Market Square Arena	15–15
31	January 5	@ Dallas	W 144–135				Reunion Arena	15–16
32	January 6	@ San Antonio	W 101–99				HemisFair Arena	16–16
33	January 8	@ Houston	L 96–110				The Summit	17–16
34	January 10	@ Utah	L 96–105				Salt Palace	17–17
35	January 13	Philadelphia	L 94–101				Market Square Arena	17–18
36	January 15	Washington	W 113–105				Market Square Arena	18–18
37	January 17	Dallas	W 119–115 (2OT)				Market Square Arena	19–18
38	January 19	Chicago	W 109–95				Market Square Arena	20–18
39	January 21; 7:30 p.m. EST	@ Boston	L 100–130	Williams (17)	Williams (10)	Fleming (7)	Boston Garden; 14,890	20–19
40	January 22; 8:00 p.m. EST	L.A. Lakers	L 108–118	Stipanovich (25)	Williams (15)	Fleming (6)	Market Square Arena; 16,912	20–20
41	January 24	Phoenix	L 103–104				Market Square Arena	20–21
42	January 27	@ Atlanta	L 98–114				The Omni	20–22
43	January 30; 7:30 p.m. EST	Boston	L 94–100	Person (26)	Williams (12)	Fleming (8)	Market Square Arena; 16,912	20–23
44	January 31	@ Cleveland	L 100–102				Richfield Coliseum	20–24

February: 7–6 (home: 3–1; road: 4–5)

Game	Date	Team	Score	High points	High rebounds	High assists	Location Attendance	Record
45	February 3	Philadelphia	L 94–99				Market Square Arena	20–25
46	February 5; 7:30 p.m. EST	@ Detroit	W 98–93	Fleming (24)	Tisdale (13)	Fleming, Person (4)	Pontiac Silverdome; 13,410	21–25
All-Star Break
47	February 10	@ Golden State	W 126–125 (OT)				Oakland-Alameda County Coliseum Arena	22–25
48	February 11	@ Phoenix	W 121–105				Arizona Veterans Memorial Coliseum	23–25
49	February 13; 10:30 p.m. EST	@ L.A. Lakers	L 108–113	Fleming (19)	Person (9)	Fleming (7)	The Forum; 17,505	23–26
50	February 14	@ Denver	L 113–129				McNichols Sports Arena	23–27
51	February 16	Golden State	W 112–93				Market Square Arena	24–27
52	February 18; 7:30 p.m. EST	Seattle	W 105–88	Long (29)	Person (9)	Person (6)	Market Square Arena; 9,077	25–27
53	February 20	@ Atlanta	W 107–105				The Omni	26–27
54	February 22	Sacramento	W 103–101				Market Square Arena	27–27
55	February 24	@ Milwaukee	L 114–120 (2OT)				MECCA Arena	27–28
56	February 26	@ Washington	L 94–100				Capital Centre	27–29
57	February 27	@ New Jersey	L 115–125				Brendan Byrne Arena	27–30

March: 9–5 (home: 8–3; road: 1–2)

Game	Date	Team	Score	High points	High rebounds	High assists	Location Attendance	Record
58	March 1	New York	W 122–115 (OT)				Market Square Arena	28–30
59	March 3	Atlanta	L 108–109				Market Square Arena	28–31
60	March 7	Milwaukee	L 120–124				Market Square Arena	28–32
61	March 9	Utah	W 107–102				Market Square Arena	29–32
62	March 11; 7:30 p.m. EST	Detroit	L 98–107	Long, Tisdale (15)	Stipanoich, Tisdale (8)	Richardson (7)	Market Square Arena; 9,063	29–33
63	March 13; 7:30 p.m. EST	Boston	W 116–109	Person (24)	Stipanovich (12)	Fleming (8)	Market Square Arena; 16,912	30–33
64	March 15	New Jersey	W 123–99				Market Square Arena	31–33
65	March 16; 7:30 p.m. EST	@ Detroit	L 95–115	Long (17)	Person (10)	Fleming, Russell (5)	Pontiac Silverdome; 15,348	31–34
66	March 19	@ New York	L 105–111 (OT)				Madison Square Garden	31–35
67	March 21	Cleveland	W 77–76				Market Square Arena	32–35
68	March 23	Washington	W 101–92				Market Square Arena	33–35
69	March 25	Milwaukee	W 125–108				Market Square Arena	34–35
70	March 27	New York	W 100–91				Market Square Arena	35–35
71	March 28	@ Atlanta	W 120–114				The Omni	36–35

April: 5–6 (home: 2–2; road: 3–4)

Game	Date	Team	Score	High points	High rebounds	High assists	Location Attendance	Record
72	April 1	Chicago	W 99–94				Market Square Arena	37–35
73	April 2; 7:30 p.m. EST	@ Detroit	L 73–119	Stipanovich (12)	Stipanovich (8)	Fleming (6)	Pontiac Silverdome; 25,778	37–36
74	April 4	@ New York	L 108–112				Madison Square Garden	37–37
75	April 7	New Jersey	W 128–114				Market Square Arena	38–37
76	April 9	@ Cleveland	L 99–111				Richfield Coliseum	38–38
77	April 10	@ Washington	W 115–101				Capital Centre	39–38
78	April 12	@ Chicago	L 95–116				Chicago Stadium	39–39
79	April 13	Atlanta	L 101–102				Market Square Arena	39–40
80	April 15; 7:30 p.m. EST	Boston	L 85–108	Long (23)	Stipanovich (9)	Fleming (7)	Market Square Arena; 16,912	39–41
81	April 17	@ Philadelphia	W 115–111				The Spectrum	40–41
82	April 18	@ New Jersey	W 112–103				Brendan Byrne Arena	41–41

1986–87 schedule

== Playoffs ==
1987 playoff game log
Eastern Conference First Round: 1–3 (home: 1–1; road: 0–2)

Game	Date	Team	Score	High points	High rebounds	High assists	Location Attendance	Series
1	April 24	@ Atlanta	L 94–110	Steve Stipanovich (22)	Steve Stipanovich (13)	Vern Fleming (6)	The Omni; 16,522	0–1
2	April 26	@ Atlanta	L 93–94	Chuck Person (24)	Herb Williams (8)	Williams, Fleming (4)	The Omni; 16,522	0–2
3	April 29	Atlanta	W 96–87	Chuck Person (23)	Chuck Person (17)	Chuck Person (7)	Market Square Arena; 12,303	1–2
4	May 1	Atlanta	L 97–101	Chuck Person (40)	Vern Fleming (11)	Vern Fleming (8)	Market Square Arena; 14,039	1–3

1987 schedule

== Player statistics ==
=== Regular season ===
Player	POS	GP	GS	MP	REB	AST	STL	BLK	PTS	MPG	RPG	APG	SPG	BPG	PPG
Vern Fleming	PG	82	82	2,549	334	473	109	18	980	31.1	4.1	5.8	1.3	.2	12.0
Chuck Person	SF	82	78	2,956	677	295	90	16	1,541	36.0	8.3	3.6	1.1	.2	18.8
Steve Stipanovich	C	81	81	2,761	670	180	106	97	1,072	34.1	8.3	2.2	1.3	1.2	13.2
Wayman Tisdale	PF	81	15	2,159	475	117	50	26	1,174	26.7	5.9	1.4	.6	.3	14.5
John Long	SG	80	68	2,265	217	258	96	8	1,218	28.3	2.7	3.2	1.2	.1	15.2
Clint Richardson	SG	78	14	1,396	143	241	49	7	501	17.9	1.8	3.1	.6	.1	6.4
Kyle Macy	PG	76	0	1,250	113	197	59	7	376	16.4	1.5	2.6	.8	.1	4.9
Herb Williams	PF	74	67	2,526	543	174	59	93	1,101	34.1	7.3	2.4	.8	1.3	14.9
Ron Anderson	SF	63	0	721	151	54	31	3	363	11.4	2.4	.9	.5	.0	5.8
Stuart Gray	C	55	1	456	129	26	10	28	110	8.3	2.3	.5	.2	.5	2.0
Walker Russell	PG	48	0	511	55	129	20	5	157	10.6	1.1	2.7	.4	.1	3.3
Greg Dreiling	C	24	0	128	43	7	2	2	42	5.3	1.8	.3	.1	.1	1.8
Michael Brooks	SF	10	0	148	28	11	9	0	33	14.8	2.8	1.1	.9	.0	3.3
Peter Verhoeven	PF	5	0	44	7	2	2	1	10	8.8	1.4	.4	.4	.2	2.0
Clark Kellogg	PF	4	4	60	11	6	5	0	20	15.0	2.8	1.5	1.3	.0	5.0

- ^{†} Denotes player spent time with another team in the season. Stats reflect time with the Pacers only.

=== Playoffs ===
Player	POS	GP	GS	MP	REB	AST	STL	BLK	PTS	MPG	RPG	APG	SPG	BPG	PPG
Chuck Person	SF	4	4	159	33	20	5	2	108	39.8	8.3	5.0	1.3	.5	27.0
Steve Stipanovich	C	4	4	149	30	3	3	2	55	37.3	7.5	.8	.8	.5	13.8
Vern Fleming	PG	4	4	141	26	24	4	1	49	35.3	6.5	6.0	1.0	.3	12.3
Herb Williams	PF	4	4	134	20	7	0	1	47	33.5	5.0	1.8	.0	.3	11.8
John Long	SG	4	4	109	6	9	6	0	44	27.3	1.5	2.3	1.5	.0	11.0
Wayman Tisdale	PF	4	0	108	16	9	1	0	51	27.0	4.0	2.3	.3	.0	12.8
Clint Richardson	SG	4	0	73	10	8	0	0	16	18.3	2.5	2.0	.0	.0	4.0
Kyle Macy	PG	4	0	49	3	5	1	0	4	12.3	.8	1.3	.3	.0	1.0
Ron Anderson	SF	4	0	24	3	0	0	0	4	6.0	.8	.0	.0	.0	1.0
Stuart Gray	C	3	0	14	7	0	0	0	2	4.7	2.3	.0	.0	.0	.7

== Awards and records ==
- Chuck Person, NBA Rookie of the Year Award
- Chuck Person, NBA All-Rookie Team 1st Team

== See also ==
- 1986-87 NBA season
