= 1986–87 Cleveland Cavaliers season =

NBA professional basketball team season

- Head coach: Lenny Wilkens
- General manager: Wayne Embry
- Owners: Gordon Gund; George Gund III
- Arena: Coliseum at Richfield

Results
- Record: 31–51 (.378)
- Place: Division: 6th (Central); Conference: 9th (Eastern)
- Playoff finish: Did not qualify
- Stats at Basketball Reference

Local media
- Television: WUAB
- Radio: WWWE

The 1986–87 Cleveland Cavaliers season was the Cavaliers' 17th season in the NBA.

The season saw the team draft Brad Daugherty and Ron Harper with the first and eighth overall picks, respectively. Future four-time All-Star Mark Price was brought in from Dallas, who drafted him in the second round of the draft.

== Draft picks ==
Round	Pick	Player	Position	Nationality	School/Club team
1	1	Brad Daugherty	C	United States	North Carolina
1	8	Ron Harper	G/SF	United States	Miami (OH)
2	29	Johnny Newman	SF	United States	Richmond
3	50	Kevin Henderson		United States	California State-Fullerton
4	73	Warren Martin		United States	North Carolina
5	96	Ben Davis		United States	Gardner-Webb
6	119	Gilbert Wilburn		United States	New Mexico State
7	142	Ralph Dalton		United States	Georgetown

== Roster ==
1986–87 Cleveland Cavaliers roster
Players

Pos.	No.	Player	Height	Weight	DOB	From
PG	5	John Bagley	6 ft 0 in (1.83 m)	185 lb (84 kg)	1960-04-23	Boston College
SF	23	Tyrone Corbin	6 ft 6 in (1.98 m)	210 lb (95 kg)	1962-12-31	DePaul
C	43	Brad Daugherty	7 ft 0 in (2.13 m)	245 lb (111 kg)	1965-10-19	North Carolina
SG	3	Craig Ehlo	6 ft 6 in (1.98 m)	180 lb (82 kg)	1961-08-11	Washington State
SG	4	Ron Harper	6 ft 6 in (1.98 m)	185 lb (84 kg)	1964-01-20	Miami (OH)
SF	35	Phil Hubbard	6 ft 8 in (2.03 m)	215 lb (98 kg)	1956-12-13	Michigan
PF	24	Keith Lee	6 ft 10 in (2.08 m)	215 lb (98 kg)	1962-12-28	Memphis
SF	22	Johnny Newman	6 ft 7 in (2.01 m)	190 lb (86 kg)	1963-11-28	Richmond
PG	25	Mark Price	6 ft 0 in (1.83 m)	170 lb (77 kg)	1964-02-15	Georgia Tech
C	54	Melvin Turpin	6 ft 11 in (2.11 m)	240 lb (109 kg)	1960-12-28	Kentucky
C	41	Mark West	6 ft 10 in (2.08 m)	230 lb (104 kg)	1960-11-05	Old Dominion
PF	18	Hot Rod Williams	6 ft 11 in (2.11 m)	215 lb (98 kg)	1962-08-09	Tulane

Coaches
Head coach
- Lenny Wilkens
Assistant(s)
- Dick Helm
- Brian Winters

Legend
- (DP) Unsigned draft pick
- (FA) Free agent
- (S) Suspended
- Injured

Roster
Updated: March 5, 1987

== Regular season ==
=== Season standings ===
Central Division	W	L	PCT	GB	Home	Road	Div
y-Atlanta Hawks	57	25	.695	–	35–6	22–19	17–13
x-Detroit Pistons	52	30	.634	5	32–9	20–21	17–13
x-Milwaukee Bucks	50	32	.610	7	32–9	18–23	17–13
x-Indiana Pacers	41	41	.500	16	28–13	13–28	13–16
x-Chicago Bulls	40	42	.488	17	29–12	11–30	17–12
Cleveland Cavaliers	31	51	.378	26	25–16	6–35	8–22

#	Eastern Conference				
#	Team	W	L	PCT	GB
1	c-Boston Celtics	59	23	.720	–
2	y-Atlanta Hawks	57	25	.695	2
3	x-Detroit Pistons	52	30	.634	7
4	x-Milwaukee Bucks	50	32	.610	9
5	x-Philadelphia 76ers	45	37	.549	14
6	x-Washington Bullets	42	40	.512	17
7	x-Indiana Pacers	41	41	.500	18
8	x-Chicago Bulls	40	42	.488	19
9	Cleveland Cavaliers	31	51	.378	28
10	New Jersey Nets	24	58	.293	35
11	New York Knicks	24	58	.293	35

z - clinched division title
y - clinched division title
x - clinched playoff spot

=== Game log ===
1986–87 game log
Total: 31–51 (Home: 25–16; Road: 6–35)
November: 5–9 (home: 2–2; road: 3–7)

Game	Date	Team	Score	High points	High rebounds	High assists	Location Attendance	Record
2	November 2, 1986	Chicago						
4	November 7, 1986	@ Golden State						
8	November 15, 1986	@ Dallas						
9	November 16, 1986	@ Houston						
10	November 19, 1986	Golden State						
11	November 20, 1986	@ Atlanta	L 89–108				The Omni; 8,547	3–8
12	November 22, 1986	@ Detroit						

December : 8–7 (home: 7–3; road: 1–4)

Game	Date	Team	Score	High points	High rebounds	High assists	Location Attendance	Record
16	December 4, 1986	Detroit						
17	December 6, 1986	Boston						
18	December 9, 1986	Atlanta	L 98–122				Coliseum at Richfield; 10,276	8–10
25	December 23, 1986	@ Chicago						
28	December 29, 1986	Atlanta	W 107–106				Coliseum at Richfield; 15,458	13–15

January : 5–11 (home: 5–5; road: 0–6)

Game	Date	Team	Score	High points	High rebounds	High assists	Location Attendance	Record
32	January 6, 1987	Chicago						
34	January 10, 1987	@ Atlanta	L 104–129				The Omni; 15,649	14–20
35	January 13, 1987	Detroit						
36	January 14, 1987	@ Detroit						
37	January 16, 1987	@ Boston						
39	January 19, 1987	Houston						
41	January 23, 1987	@ Chicago						
42	January 24, 1987	Chicago						
44	January 29, 1987	Atlanta	W 102–91				Coliseum at Richfield; 10,569	17–27

February : 5–7 (home: 4–1; road: 1–6)

Game	Date	Team	Score	High points	High rebounds	High assists	Location Attendance	Record
46	February 4, 1987	@ Boston						
49	February 12, 1987	Detroit						
54	February 22, 1987	Chicago						
56	February 25, 1987	@ Detroit						
57	February 28, 1987	@ Denver						

March : 4–12 (home: 3–4; road: 1–8)

Game	Date	Team	Score	High points	High rebounds	High assists	Location Attendance	Record
67	March 18, 1987	Denver						
70	March 24, 1987	vs. Boston (at Hartford, CT)						
72	March 29, 1987	Dallas						

April : 4–5 (home: 4–1; road: 0–4)

Game	Date	Team	Score	High points	High rebounds	High assists	Location Attendance	Record
76	April 6, 1987	@ Atlanta	L 105–110				The Omni; 8,459	27–49
77	April 7, 1987							

1986–87 schedule

== Player statistics ==
Legend
GP	Games played	GS	Games started	MPG	Minutes per game
FG%	Field-goal percentage	3P%	3-point field-goal percentage	FT%	Free-throw percentage
RPG	Rebounds per game	APG	Assists per game	SPG	Steals per game
BPG	Blocks per game	PPG	Points per game

Player	GP	GS	MPG	FG%	3FG%	FT%	RPG	APG	SPG	BPG	PPG
Ron Harper	82	82	37.4	45.5	21.3	68.4	4.8	4.8	2.5	1.0	22.9
Brad Daugherty	80	80	33.7	53.8	0.0	69.6	8.1	3.8	0.6	0.8	15.7
Hot Rod Williams	80	80	33.9	48.5	0.0	74.5	7.9	1.9	0.7	2.1	14.6
Phil Hubbard	68	68	30.6	53.1	0.0	59.6	5.7	2.0	1.0	0.1	11.8
John Bagley	72	67	30.3	42.6	30.1	83.1	3.5	5.3	1.3	0.1	10.7
Mark Price	67	0	18.2	40.8	32.9	83.3	1.7	3.0	0.6	0.1	6.9
Mark West	78	13	17.1	54.3	0.0	51.4	4.3	0.5	0.3	1.0	6.5
Craig Ehlo	44	15	20.2	41.4	17.2	70.7	3.7	2.1	0.9	0.7	6.2
Keith Lee	67	1	13.0	45.5	0.0	71.3	3.7	1.0	0.4	0.6	6.1
Melvin Turpin	64	1	12.5	46.2	0.0	71.4	3.0	0.5	0.2	0.6	6.1
Johnny Newman	59	0	10.7	41.1	4.5	86.8	1.2	0.5	0.3	0.1	5.0
Tyrone Corbin	32	0	13.7	36.8	25.0	73.7	3.0	0.5	0.5	0.1	4.0
Scooter McCray	24	2	11.6	46.2	0.0	48.8	2.4	1.0	0.4	0.2	3.3
Ben Poquette	37	1	11.8	50.0	0.0	79.5	2.1	0.8	0.2	0.6	3.1
Dirk Minniefield	11	0	11.1	31.0	0.0	25.0	0.9	1.2	0.5	0.1	2.5

Player statistics citation:

== Awards and records ==
- Brad Daugherty, NBA All-Rookie Team 1st Team
- Ron Harper, NBA All-Rookie Team 1st Team
- John "Hot Rod" Williams, NBA All-Rookie Team 1st Team
