= 1986–87 Chicago Bulls season =

NBA professional basketball team season

- Head coach: Doug Collins
- General manager: Jerry Krause
- Owner: Jerry Reinsdorf
- Arena: Chicago Stadium

Results
- Record: 40–42 (.488)
- Place: Division: 5th (Central); Conference: 8th (Eastern)
- Playoff finish: First round (lost to Celtics 0–3)
- Stats at Basketball Reference

Local media
- Television: WFLD; Sportsvision (Jim Durham, Johnny “Red” Kerr)
- Radio: WMAQ (Jim Durham, Johnny “Red” Kerr)

The 1986–87 Chicago Bulls season was the 21st season of the franchise in the National Basketball Association (NBA).

== NBA draft ==
Note: This is not an extensive list; it only covers the first and second rounds, and any other players drafted by the franchise that played at least one NBA game.

Round	Pick	Player	Position	Nationality	School/Club team
1	9	Brad Sellers	F/C	United States	Ohio State
2	28	Larry Krystkowiak	F	United States	Montana
3	52	Ricky Wilson	G	United States	George Mason
4	74	Scott Meents	F	United States	Illinois
6	120	Pete Myers	G	United States	Arkansas--Little Rock

== Roster ==
1986–87 Chicago Bulls roster
Players

Pos.	No.	Player	Height	Weight	DOB	From
F	20	Gene Banks	6 ft 7 in (2.01 m)	215 lb (98 kg)	1959-05-15	Duke
C	17	Mike Brown	6 ft 9 in (2.06 m)	257 lb (117 kg)	1963-07-19	George Washington
C	40	Dave Corzine	6 ft 11 in (2.11 m)	250 lb (113 kg)	1956-04-25	DePaul
G	23	Michael Jordan	6 ft 6 in (1.98 m)	198 lb (90 kg)	1963-02-17	North Carolina
G	10	Pete Myers	6 ft 6 in (1.98 m)	180 lb (82 kg)	1963-09-15	Little Rock
F	34	Charles Oakley	6 ft 9 in (2.06 m)	245 lb (111 kg)	1963-12-18	Virginia Union
G	5	John Paxson	6 ft 2 in (1.88 m)	185 lb (84 kg)	1960-09-29	Notre Dame
F	50	Ben Poquette	6 ft 9 in (2.06 m)	235 lb (107 kg)	1955-05-07	Central Michigan
F	6	Brad Sellers	7 ft 0 in (2.13 m)	210 lb (95 kg)	1962-12-17	Ohio State
G	3	Sedale Threatt	6 ft 2 in (1.88 m)	175 lb (79 kg)	1961-09-10	West Virginia Tech
F	21	Elston Turner	6 ft 5 in (1.96 m)	190 lb (86 kg)	1959-06-10	Mississippi
C	31	Granville Waiters	6 ft 11 in (2.11 m)	225 lb (102 kg)	1961-01-08	Ohio State

Coaches
Head coach
- Doug Collins
Assistant(s)
- Gene Littles
- Billy McKinney
- Tex Winter

Legend
- (DP) Unsigned draft pick
- (FA) Free agent
- (S) Suspended
- Injured

Roster
Updated: February 15, 1987

== Regular season ==
With yet another new head coach, Doug Collins, in for 1986–87, the Bulls improved to 40–42. Chicago qualified for the playoffs for the third straight season but was again eliminated by Boston in the first round.

The team's record was a secondary concern for most fans, who had their eyes riveted on team superstar Jordan. In late November and early December he went on a rampage, scoring 40 or more points in nine consecutive games. On February 26 he poured in 58 points against the New Jersey Nets, including a record 26 of 27 free throws. On March 4 he hit for 61 points against Detroit. Just a month later, on April 16, he matched that performance with 61 against Atlanta. That season Jordan became the first NBA player to reach 3,000 points in a season since Wilt Chamberlain did it in 1962–63.

Jordan led the league in scoring at 37.1 points per game, his career high for a season. He set Bulls single-season records for points (3,041), field goals (1,098), free throws (833), and steals (236). His output was rewarded with the first in a series of All-NBA First Team selections.

=== Season standings ===
Central Division	W	L	PCT	GB	Home	Road	Div
y-Atlanta Hawks	57	25	.695	–	35–6	22–19	17–13
x-Detroit Pistons	52	30	.634	5	32–9	20–21	17–13
x-Milwaukee Bucks	50	32	.610	7	32–9	18–23	17–13
x-Indiana Pacers	41	41	.500	16	28–13	13–28	13–16
x-Chicago Bulls	40	42	.488	17	29–12	11–30	17–12
Cleveland Cavaliers	31	51	.378	26	25–16	6–35	8–22

#	Eastern Conference				
#	Team	W	L	PCT	GB
1	c-Boston Celtics	59	23	.720	–
2	y-Atlanta Hawks	57	25	.695	2
3	x-Detroit Pistons	52	30	.634	7
4	x-Milwaukee Bucks	50	32	.610	9
5	x-Philadelphia 76ers	45	37	.549	14
6	x-Washington Bullets	42	40	.512	17
7	x-Indiana Pacers	41	41	.500	18
8	x-Chicago Bulls	40	42	.488	19
9	Cleveland Cavaliers	31	51	.378	28
10	New Jersey Nets	24	58	.293	35
11	New York Knicks	24	58	.293	35

== Playoffs ==
1987 playoff game log
First Round: 0–3 (home: 0–1; road: 0–2)

Game	Date	Team	Score	High points	High rebounds	High assists	Location Attendance	Series
1	April 23	@ Boston	L 104–108	Michael Jordan (35)	Charles Oakley (12)	Michael Jordan (7)	Boston Garden; 14,890	0–1
2	April 26	@ Boston	L 96–105	Michael Jordan (42)	Charles Oakley (15)	Jordan, Threatt (4)	Boston Garden; 14,890	0–2
3	April 28	Boston	L 94–105	Michael Jordan (30)	Charles Oakley (19)	Michael Jordan (7)	Chicago Stadium; 18,122	0–3

1987 schedule

== Player statistics ==
=== Regular season ===
Regular Season Starting Lineup Statistics
Position	Player	Points	Rebounds	Assists	Steals	Blocks
Point Guard	John Paxson	11	2	6		
Shooting Guard	Michael Jordan	37	5	5	3	1.5
Small Forward	Gene Banks	10	5	3		
Power Forward	Charles Oakley	14.5	13	4	1	
Center	Dave Corzine	8	7	2.5		1

== Awards and records ==
- Michael Jordan, NBA All-Star Weekend Slam Dunk Contest Winner
- Michael Jordan, All-NBA First Team
- Michael Jordan, NBA All-Star Game

== See also ==
- 1986-87 NBA season
