= 1986–87 Detroit Pistons season =

NBA team season

- Head coach: Chuck Daly
- General manager: Jack McCloskey
- Owner: William Davidson
- Arena: Pontiac Silverdome

Results
- Record: 52–30 (.634)
- Place: Division: 2nd (Central); Conference: 3rd (Eastern)
- Playoff finish: Eastern Conference finals (lost to Celtics 3–4)
- Stats at Basketball Reference

The 1986–87 Detroit Pistons season was the Detroit Pistons' 39th season in the NBA and 30th season in the city of Detroit. The team played at the Pontiac Silverdome in suburban Pontiac, Michigan.

The disappointing finish of the previous year caused a roster shake-up as the team dealt Earl Cureton to the Chicago Bulls for Sidney Green, Kent Benson and Kelly Tripucka to the Utah Jazz for Adrian Dantley, and guard John Long to the Seattle SuperSonics for draft picks. The team added John Salley and Dennis Rodman in the 1986 NBA draft to complete the turnover. The moves by GM "Trader Jack" McCloskey paid immediate dividends as the team finished 52–30 (.634), 2nd in the Central Division. The team advanced to the playoffs, defeating the Washington Bullets 3–0 in the first round and then the Atlanta Hawks 4–1 to advance to the Eastern Conference finals against the Boston Celtics.

The tightly contested conference finals went to a 7th game thanks to Celtics star Larry Bird when he made an improbable steal in the closing seconds of Game 5. Leading by 1 point, Pistons star Isiah Thomas waived off a timeout request from Pistons coach Chuck Daly, hurried a lofting inbound pass to center Bill Laimbeer, as Bird stepped in for the steal, passing to teammate Dennis Johnson for the 108–107 Boston win. Long-time Celtic announcer Johnny Most's call of Bird's game-saving steal in the 1987 playoffs at the end of Game 5 in the Eastern Conference finals vs. Detroit was memorable with "Aaaaaaand now there's a steal by Bird, underneath to DEE-Jay, he lays it in...and Boston has a one-point lead right with one second to go... What a play by Bird!...Oh my this place is goin' crazy!" After a Pistons home win in Game 6, the series returned to the Boston Garden for the 7th game with the Celtics holding off Detroit 117–114 for the series victory.

Detroit was led on the season by guard Thomas (20.6 ppg, 10.0 apg, NBA All-Star), center Laimbeer (15.4 ppg, 11.6 rpg, NBA All-Star), and forward Dantley (21.5 ppg).

== Draft picks ==
Round	Pick	Player	Position	Nationality	College
1	11	John Salley	PF/C	United States	Georgia Tech
2	27	Dennis Rodman	SF/PF	United States	Southeastern Oklahoma State

== Roster ==
1986–87 Detroit Pistons roster
Players

Pos.	No.	Player	Height	Weight	DOB	From
SF	00	Tony Campbell	6 ft 7 in (2.01 m)	215 lb (98 kg)	1962-05-07	Ohio State
SF	45	Adrian Dantley	6 ft 5 in (1.96 m)	208 lb (94 kg)	1955-02-28	Notre Dame
SG	4	Joe Dumars	6 ft 3 in (1.91 m)	190 lb (86 kg)	1963-05-24	McNeese State
PF	12	Sidney Green	6 ft 9 in (2.06 m)	220 lb (100 kg)	1961-01-04	UNLV
SG	15	Vinnie Johnson	6 ft 2 in (1.88 m)	200 lb (91 kg)	1956-09-01	Baylor
C	40	Bill Laimbeer	6 ft 11 in (2.11 m)	245 lb (111 kg)	1957-05-19	Notre Dame
F/C	44	Rick Mahorn	6 ft 10 in (2.08 m)	240 lb (109 kg)	1958-09-21	Hampton
C	42	Chuck Nevitt	7 ft 5 in (2.26 m)	217 lb (98 kg)	1959-06-13	NC State
PF	41	Kurt Nimphius	6 ft 10 in (2.08 m)	218 lb (99 kg)	1958-03-13	Arizona State
SF	10	Dennis Rodman	6 ft 7 in (2.01 m)	220 lb (100 kg)	1961-05-13	SE Oklahoma State
F/C	22	John Salley	6 ft 11 in (2.11 m)	230 lb (104 kg)	1964-05-16	Georgia Tech
PG	11	Isiah Thomas	6 ft 1 in (1.85 m)	180 lb (82 kg)	1961-04-30	Indiana

Coaches
Head coach
- Chuck Daly
Assistant(s)
- Ron Rothstein
- Dick Versace

Legend
- (DP) Unsigned draft pick
- (FA) Free agent
- (S) Suspended
- Injured

Roster
Updated: February 10, 1987

== Regular season ==
=== Season standings ===
Central Division	W	L	PCT	GB	Home	Road	Div
y-Atlanta Hawks	57	25	.695	–	35–6	22–19	17–13
x-Detroit Pistons	52	30	.634	5	32–9	20–21	17–13
x-Milwaukee Bucks	50	32	.610	7	32–9	18–23	17–13
x-Indiana Pacers	41	41	.500	16	28–13	13–28	13–16
x-Chicago Bulls	40	42	.488	17	29–12	11–30	17–12
Cleveland Cavaliers	31	51	.378	26	25–16	6–35	8–22

#	Eastern Conference				
#	Team	W	L	PCT	GB
1	c-Boston Celtics	59	23	.720	–
2	y-Atlanta Hawks	57	25	.695	2
3	x-Detroit Pistons	52	30	.634	7
4	x-Milwaukee Bucks	50	32	.610	9
5	x-Philadelphia 76ers	45	37	.549	14
6	x-Washington Bullets	42	40	.512	17
7	x-Indiana Pacers	41	41	.500	18
8	x-Chicago Bulls	40	42	.488	19
9	Cleveland Cavaliers	31	51	.378	28
10	New Jersey Nets	24	58	.293	35
11	New York Knicks	24	58	.293	35

z – clinched division title
y – clinched division title
x – clinched playoff spot

== Game log ==
=== Regular season ===
1986–87 game log
Total: 52–30 (home: 32–9; road: 20–21)
October: 0–1 (home: 0–1; road: 0–0)

Game	Date	Team	Score	High points	High rebounds	High assists	Location Attendance	Record

November: 6–5 (home: 5–2; road: 1–3)

Game	Date	Team	Score	High points	High rebounds	High assists	Location Attendance	Record
8	November 15, 1986	Boston	L 111–118				Pontiac Silverdome	3–5

December: 11–3 (home: 6–1; road: 5–2)

Game	Date	Team	Score	High points	High rebounds	High assists	Location Attendance	Record
18	December 13, 1986	L.A. Lakers	W 119–114				Pontiac Silverdome	10–8

January: 11–6 (home: 7–1; road: 4–5)

Game	Date	Team	Score	High points	High rebounds	High assists	Location Attendance	Record
31	January 10, 1987	Boston	W 118–101				Pontiac Silverdome	21–10

February: 9–3 (home: 6–2; road: 3–1)

Game	Date	Team	Score	High points	High rebounds	High assists	Location Attendance	Record
All-Star Break
50	February 19, 1987	Seattle	W 117–105				Pontiac Silverdome	33–17

March: 10–7 (home: 4–2; road: 6–5)

Game	Date	Team	Score	High points	High rebounds	High assists	Location Attendance	Record
56	March 1, 1987	@ Boston	L 102–112				Boston Garden	37–19
59	March 8, 1987	Boston	W 122–119 (OT)				Pontiac Silverdome	39–20
69	March 26, 1987	@ L.A. Lakers	L 111–128				The Forum	45–24
71	March 29, 1987	@ Seattle	W 108–107				Seattle Center Coliseum	47–24

April: 5–5 (home: 4–0; road: 1–5)

Game	Date	Team	Score	High points	High rebounds	High assists	Location Attendance	Record
74	April 3, 1987	@ Boston	L 115–119 (OT)				Boston Garden	48–26

1986–87 schedule

== Playoffs ==
1987 playoff game log
First Round: 3–0 (home: 2–0; road: 1–0)

Game	Date	Team	Score	High points	High rebounds	High assists	Location Attendance	Series
1	April 24	Washington	W 106–92	Isiah Thomas (34)	Laimbeer, Rodman (10)	Isiah Thomas (9)	Pontiac Silverdome; 15,419	1–0
2	April 26	Washington	W 128–85	Adrian Dantley (24)	Bill Laimbeer (9)	Vinnie Johnson (13)	Pontiac Silverdome; 14,389	2–0
3	April 29	@ Washington	W 97–96	Dantley, Johnson (21)	Rick Mahorn (12)	Isiah Thomas (10)	Capital Centre; 10,831	3–0

Conference semifinals: 4–1 (home: 2–0; road: 2–1)

Game	Date	Team	Score	High points	High rebounds	High assists	Location Attendance	Series
1	May 3	@ Atlanta	W 112–111	Isiah Thomas (30)	Dennis Rodman (10)	Isiah Thomas (10)	Omni Coliseum; 14,361	1–0
2	May 5	@ Atlanta	L 102–115	Laimbeer, Rodman (20)	Bill Laimbeer (12)	Isiah Thomas (6)	Omni Coliseum; 16,522	1–1
3	May 8	Atlanta	W 108–99	Isiah Thomas (35)	Dennis Rodman (9)	Isiah Thomas (8)	Pontiac Silverdome; 24,544	2–1
4	May 10	Atlanta	W 89–88	Isiah Thomas (31)	Rick Mahorn (17)	Joe Dumars (5)	Pontiac Silverdome; 17,269	3–1
5	May 13	@ Atlanta	W 104–96	Joe Dumars (21)	Rick Mahorn (16)	Isiah Thomas (12)	Omni Coliseum; 16,522	4–1

Eastern Conference Finals: 3–4 (home: 3–0; road: 0–4)

Game	Date	Team	Score	High points	High rebounds	High assists	Location Attendance	Series
1	May 19, 1987	@ Boston	L 91–104	Isiah Thomas (18)	Rick Mahorn (11)	Isiah Thomas (10)	Boston Garden; 14,890	0–1
2	May 21, 198	@ Boston	L 101–110	Isiah Thomas (36)	Bill Laimbeer (16)	Bill Laimbeer (7)	Boston Garden; 14,890	0–2
3	May 23, 1987	Boston	W 122–104	Adrian Dantley (25)	Rick Mahorn (12)	Vinnie Johnson (8)	Pontiac Silverdome; 23,525	1–2
4	May 24, 1987	Boston	W 145–119	Adrian Dantley (32)	Bill Laimbeer (13)	Thomas, Dumars (8)	Pontiac Silverdome; 27,387	2–2
5	May 26, 1987	@ Boston	L 107–108	Adrian Dantley (25)	Bill Laimbeer (14)	Isiah Thomas (11)	Boston Garden; 14,890	2–3
6	May 28, 1987	Boston	W 113–105	Dantley, Johnson (24)	Rick Mahorn (18)	Isiah Thomas (9)	Pontiac Silverdome; 28,383	3–3
7	May 30, 1987	@ Boston	L 114–117	Joe Dumars (35)	Bill Laimbeer (13)	Isiah Thomas (9)	Boston Garden; 14,890	3–4

1987 schedule

== Awards and records ==
- Isiah Thomas, All-NBA Second Team

== See also ==
- 1986-87 NBA season
