= 1986–87 New York Knicks season =

Season of National Basketball Association team the New York Knicks

- Head coach: Hubie Brown; Bob Hill
- General manager: Scotty Stirling
- Arena: Madison Square Garden

Results
- Record: 24–58 (.293)
- Place: Division: 5th (Atlantic); Conference: 11th (Eastern)
- Playoff finish: Did not qualify
- Stats at Basketball Reference

Local media
- Television: WOR-TV; MSG Network (Marv Albert, John Andariese)
- Radio: WNBC (Jim Karvellas, Ernie Grunfeld)

The 1986–87 New York Knicks season was the Knicks' 41st season in the NBA and the last time they would miss the playoffs until their 2001–02 season.

With second-year center Patrick Ewing still struggling with injuries and after starting the season 4–12, head coach Hubie Brown was fired and Bob Hill took over for the rest of the season. Brown returned to coach the Memphis Grizzlies in the 2002–03 season. Bernard King, only able to play six games this year, was released at the end of the season, signing as a free agent with the Washington Bullets.

== Draft picks ==
| Round | Pick | Player | Position | Nationality | School/Club team |
|---|---|---|---|---|---|
| 1 | 5 | Kenny Walker | SF | United States | Kentucky |
| 2 | 47 | Michael Jackson | PG | United States | Georgetown |
| 4 | 71 | Calvin Thompson | | United States | Kansas |
| 5 | 94 | Jerome Mincey | | United States | Alabama-Birmingham |
| 6 | 117 | Butch Wade | | United States | Michigan |
| 7 | 140 | Duane Kendall | | United States | South Carolina |

== Roster ==
New York Knicks roster
Players

| Pos. | No. | Player | Height | Weight | DOB | From |
|---|---|---|---|---|---|---|
| C | 25 | Bill Cartwright | 7 ft 1 in (2.16 m) | 245 lb (111 kg) | 1957–07–30 | San Francisco |
| PF | 42 | Pat Cummings | 6 ft 9 in (2.06 m) | 230 lb (104 kg) | 1956–07–11 | Cincinnati |
| C | 33 | Patrick Ewing | 7 ft 0 in (2.13 m) | 240 lb (109 kg) | 1962–08–05 | Georgetown |
| PG | 7 | Gerald Henderson | 6 ft 2 in (1.88 m) | 175 lb (79 kg) | 1956–01–16 | VCU |
| SF | 30 | Bernard King (injured) | 6 ft 7 in (2.01 m) | 205 lb (93 kg) | 1956–12–04 | Tennessee |
| PF | 14 | Chris McNealy | 6 ft 7 in (2.01 m) | 210 lb (95 kg) | 1961–07–15 | San José State |
| C | 44 | Jawann Oldham | 7 ft 0 in (2.13 m) | 210 lb (95 kg) | 1957–07–04 | Seattle |
| SF | 55 | Louis Orr | 6 ft 8 in (2.03 m) | 175 lb (79 kg) | 1958–05–07 | Syracuse |
| PG | 2 | Rory Sparrow | 6 ft 2 in (1.88 m) | 175 lb (79 kg) | 1958–06–12 | Villanova |
| PF | 23 | Bob Thornton | 6 ft 10 in (2.08 m) | 225 lb (102 kg) | 1962–07–10 | UC Irvine |
| SG | 6 | Trent Tucker | 6 ft 5 in (1.96 m) | 193 lb (88 kg) | 1959–12–20 | Minnesota |
| SF | 34 | Kenny Walker | 6 ft 8 in (2.03 m) | 210 lb (95 kg) | 1964–08–18 | Kentucky |
| C | 45 | Eddie Lee Wilkins | 6 ft 10 in (2.08 m) | 220 lb (100 kg) | 1962–05–07 | Gardner–Webb |
| SG | 21 | Gerald Wilkins | 6 ft 6 in (1.98 m) | 185 lb (84 kg) | 1963–09–11 | Chattanooga |
| PF | 8 | Brad Wright | 6 ft 11 in (2.11 m) | 225 lb (102 kg) | 1962–03–26 | UCLA |

Coaches
Head coach
- Bob Hill

Legend
- (DP) Unsigned draft pick
- (FA) Free agent
- (S) Suspended
- Injured

== Regular season ==
=== Season standings ===
| Atlantic Division | W | L | PCT | GB | Home | Road | Div |
|---|---|---|---|---|---|---|---|
| y-Boston Celtics | 59 | 23 | .720 | – | 39–2 | 20–21 | 15–9 |
| x-Philadelphia 76ers | 45 | 37 | .549 | 14 | 28–13 | 17–24 | 12–12 |
| x-Washington Bullets | 42 | 40 | .512 | 17 | 27–14 | 15–26 | 13–11 |
| New Jersey Nets | 24 | 58 | .293 | 35 | 19–22 | 5–36 | 12–12 |
| New York Knicks | 24 | 58 | .293 | 35 | 18–23 | 6–35 | 8–16 |

| # | Eastern Conference | | | | |
| # | Team | W | L | PCT | GB |
|---|---|---|---|---|---|
| 1 | c-Boston Celtics | 59 | 23 | .720 | – |
| 2 | y-Atlanta Hawks | 57 | 25 | .695 | 2 |
| 3 | x-Detroit Pistons | 52 | 30 | .634 | 7 |
| 4 | x-Milwaukee Bucks | 50 | 32 | .610 | 9 |
| 5 | x-Philadelphia 76ers | 45 | 37 | .549 | 14 |
| 6 | x-Washington Bullets | 42 | 40 | .512 | 17 |
| 7 | x-Indiana Pacers | 41 | 41 | .500 | 18 |
| 8 | x-Chicago Bulls | 40 | 42 | .488 | 19 |
| 9 | Cleveland Cavaliers | 31 | 51 | .378 | 28 |
| 10 | New Jersey Nets | 24 | 58 | .293 | 35 |
| 11 | New York Knicks | 24 | 58 | .293 | 35 |

z - clinched division title
y - clinched division title
x - clinched playoff spot

== Game log ==
=== Regular season ===
1986–87 game log
Total: 24–58 (home: 18–23; road: 6–35)
October: 0–1 (home: 0–0; road: 0–1)

| Game | Date | Team | Score | High points | High rebounds | High assists | Location Attendance | Record |

November: 4–11 (home: 3–3; road: 1–8)

| Game | Date | Team | Score | High points | High rebounds | High assists | Location Attendance | Record |

December: 5–9 (home: 4–5; road: 1–4)

| Game | Date | Team | Score | High points | High rebounds | High assists | Location Attendance | Record |

January: 4–10 (home: 3–3; road: 1–7)

| Game | Date | Team | Score | High points | High rebounds | High assists | Location Attendance | Record |

February: 3–9 (home: 2–4; road: 1–5)

| Game | Date | Team | Score | High points | High rebounds | High assists | Location Attendance | Record |

March: 6–10 (home: 4–5; road: 2–5)

| Game | Date | Team | Score | High points | High rebounds | High assists | Location Attendance | Record |

April: 2–8 (home: 2–3; road: 0–5)

| Game | Date | Team | Score | High points | High rebounds | High assists | Location Attendance | Record |

1986–87 schedule

== See also ==
- 1986-87 NBA season
