= 1986–87 Boston Celtics season =

NBA basketball team season

- Conference champions
- Division champions
- Head coach: K. C. Jones
- General manager: Jan Volk
- Owners: Don Gaston; Alan N. Cohen; Paul Dupee
- Arena: Boston Garden; Hartford Civic Center

Results
- Record: 59–23 (.720)
- Place: Division: 1st (Atlantic); Conference: 1st (Eastern)
- Playoff finish: NBA Finals (lost to Lakers 2–4)
- Stats at Basketball Reference

Local media
- Television: WLVI (Gil Santos, Bob Cousy); SportsChannel New England (Mike Gorman, Tom Heinsohn)
- Radio: WRKO (Johnny Most, Glenn Ordway)

The 1986–87 Boston Celtics season was the 41st season of the Boston Celtics in the National Basketball Association (NBA). The Celtics entered the season as the defending NBA Champions, having defeated the Houston Rockets in the 1986 NBA Finals in six games, winning their sixteenth NBA championship.

In the playoffs, the Celtics swept the Chicago Bulls in the First Round in three games, defeated the Milwaukee Bucks in the Semi-finals in seven games, and the Detroit Pistons in the conference finals in seven games to reach the NBA Finals for the fifth time in the 1980s. In the Finals, the Celtics faced off against their long time rival, the Los Angeles Lakers, in their third and final matchup in the NBA Finals in the 1980s. The Celtics would lose in six games to the Lakers, and it marked the last time the Celtics made it to the NBA Finals until 2008. Remarkably, the 1987 NBA Finals was the first playoff series for the Celtics in the Bird era in which they did not have the home court advantage, as they had played 24 consecutive series with the home court advantage starting in 1980.

== NBA draft ==
Thanks to the 1984 trade of Gerald Henderson and the subsequent fall of the Seattle SuperSonics, at the end of the 1985–86 season the Celtics owned not only the best team in the NBA but also the second pick in the 1986 NBA draft. The Celtics drafted small forward Len Bias with the pick and had high hopes for the young Maryland Terrapins star. The hope was that his presence would ensure that the franchise would remain a powerhouse after Bird, McHale, and Parish retired. Unfortunately, Bias died 48 hours after he was drafted, after using cocaine at a party and overdosing.

Unlike the prior year, the Celtics were forced to endure major injuries to several key players including Bill Walton, Kevin McHale and Robert Parish. With a road record of 20–21, the Celtics were a sub-.500 road team for the first time in the Larry Bird era and the first time since the 1978–79 season. However, they continued with the previous season's historic dominance at home with a record of 39–2 at Boston Garden.

Round	Pick	Player	Position	Nationality	School/Club team
1	2	Len Bias	Forward	United States	Maryland
4	93	Tony Benford	N/A	United States	Texas Tech
5	116	Dave Colbert	N/A	United States	Dayton
6	139	Greg Wendt	N/A	United States	Detroit
7	162	Tom Ivey	N/A	United States	Boston University

== Regular season ==
=== Season standings ===
Atlantic Division	W	L	PCT	GB	Home	Road	Div
y-Boston Celtics	59	23	.720	–	39–2	20–21	15–9
x-Philadelphia 76ers	45	37	.549	14	28–13	17–24	12–12
x-Washington Bullets	42	40	.512	17	27–14	15–26	13–11
New Jersey Nets	24	58	.293	35	19–22	5–36	12–12
New York Knicks	24	58	.293	35	18–23	6–35	8–16

#	Eastern Conference				
#	Team	W	L	PCT	GB
1	c-Boston Celtics	59	23	.720	–
2	y-Atlanta Hawks	57	25	.695	2
3	x-Detroit Pistons	52	30	.634	7
4	x-Milwaukee Bucks	50	32	.610	9
5	x-Philadelphia 76ers	45	37	.549	14
6	x-Washington Bullets	42	40	.512	17
7	x-Indiana Pacers	41	41	.500	18
8	x-Chicago Bulls	40	42	.488	19
9	Cleveland Cavaliers	31	51	.378	28
10	New Jersey Nets	24	58	.293	35
11	New York Knicks	24	58	.293	35

=== Game log ===
1986-87 game log
October

Game	Date	Opponent	Score	Location	Record
1	Fri. Oct. 31	Washington Bullets	120-102	Boston Garden	1-0

November

Game	Date	Opponent	Score	Location	Record
2	Sat. Nov. 1	@ Milwaukee Bucks	105-111	Milwaukee Arena (MECCA)	1-1
3	Wed. Nov. 5	Indiana Pacers	133-102	Boston Garden	2–1
4	Fri. Nov. 7	@Washington Bullets	88-86	Capital Centre	3–1
5	Tue. Nov. 11	@ New Jersey Nets	110-114	Brendan Byrne Arena	3–2
6	Wed. Nov. 12	Milwaukee Bucks	124-116	Boston Garden	4–2
7	Fri. Nov. 14	@ Chicago Bulls	124-105	Chicago Stadium	5-2
8	Sat. Nov. 15	@ Detroit Pistons	118-111	Pontiac Silverdome	6–2
9	Wed. Nov. 19	Atlanta Hawks	111-107	Boston Garden	7–2
10	Fri. Nov. 21	Golden State Warriors	135-120	Boston Garden	8–2
11	Sat. Nov. 22	@ Atlanta Hawks	96-97	The Omni	8–3
12	Tue. Nov. 25	@ Philadelphia 76ers	100-102	The Spectrum	8–4
13	Wed. Nov. 26	New York Knicks	101-90	Boston Garden	9–4
14	Fri. Nov. 28	San Antonio Spurs	111-96	Boston Garden	10–4

December

Game	Date	Opponent	Score	Location	Record
15	Tue. Dec. 2	Washington Bullets	109-117	Hartford Civic Center	10–5
16	Wed. Dec. 3	Denver Nuggets	119-113	Boston Garden	11–5
17	Fri. Dec. 5	Philadelphia 76ers	108-106	Boston Garden	12–5
18	Sat. Dec. 6	@ Cleveland Cavaliers	86-88	Richfield Coliseum	12–6
19	Wed. Dec. 10	New Jersey Nets	108-98	Boston Garden	13–6
20	Fri. Dec. 12	Los Angeles Lakers	110-117	Boston Garden	13–7
21	Sat. Dec. 13	@ Washington Bullets	105-98	Capital Centre	14–7
22	Tue. Dec. 16	@ New York Knicks	107-96	Madison Square Garden	15–7
23	Wed. Dec. 17	Indiana Pacers	113-101	Boston Garden	16–7
24	Fri. Dec. 19	@ Philadelphia 76ers	100-122	The Spectrum	16–8
25	Sat. Dec. 20	@ Milwaukee Bucks	100-120	Milwaukee Arena (MECCA)	16–9
26	Fri. Dec. 26	@ Phoenix Suns	122-112	Arizona Veterans Memorial Coliseum	17–9
27	Sat. Dec. 27	@ Los Angeles Clippers	114-101	L.A. Sports Arena	18–9
28	Mon. Dec. 29	@ Sacramento Kings	119-102	ARCO Arena I	19–9
29	Tue. Dec. 30	@ Seattle SuperSonics	104-102	Seattle Center Coliseum	20–9

January

Game	Date	Opponent	Score	Location	Record
30	Fri. Jan. 2	Chicago Bulls	113-99	Boston Garden	21–9
31	Wed. Jan. 7	Milwaukee Bucks	119-92	Boston Garden	22–9
32	Fri. Jan. 9	Sacramento Kings	109-99	Boston Garden	23–9
33	Sat. Jan. 10	@ Detroit Pistons	101-118	Pontiac Silverdome	23–10
34	Tue. Jan. 13	@ New Jersey Nets	123-117	Brendan Byrne Arena	24–10
35	Wed. Jan. 14	Dallas Mavericks	117-108	Boston Garden	25–10
36	Fri. Jan. 16	Cleveland Cavaliers	133-128 (OT)	Boston Garden	26–10
37	Sun. Jan. 18	Houston Rockets	122-99	Boston Garden	27–10
38	Mon. Jan. 19	@ New York Knicks	109-111	Madison Square Garden	27–11
39	Wed. Jan. 21	Indiana Pacers	130-100	Boston Garden	28–11
40	Fri. Jan. 23	Atlanta Hawks	126-106	Boston Garden	29–11
41	Sun. Jan. 25	Philadelphia 76ers	111-96	Boston Garden	30–11
42	Tue. Jan. 27	@ Chicago Bulls	105-97	Chicago Stadium	31–11
43	Wed. Jan. 28	Chicago Bulls	132-103	Boston Garden	32–11
44	Fri. Jan. 30	@ Indiana Pacers	100-94	Market Square Arena	33–11

February

Game	Date	Opponent	Score	Location	Record
45	Tue. Feb. 3	@ Atlanta Hawks	123-126 (OT)	The Omni	33–12
46	Wed. Feb. 4	Cleveland Cavaliers	104-102	Boston Garden	34–12
47	Tue. Feb. 10	@ Denver Nuggets	119-105	McNichols Sports Arena	35–12
48	Thu. Feb. 12	@ Golden State Warriors	134-112	Oakland Coliseum	36–12
49	Fri. Feb. 13	@ Portland Trail Blazers	131-116	Memorial Coliseum	37–12
50	Sun. Feb. 15	@ Los Angeles Lakers	103-106	The Forum	37–13
51	Mon. Feb. 16	@ Utah Jazz	89-109	Salt Palace	37–14
52	Wed. Feb. 18	@ Dallas Mavericks	113-96	Reunion Arena	38–14
53	Thu. Feb. 19	@ Houston Rockets	99-92	The Summit	39–14
54	Sat. Feb. 21	@ San Antonio Spurs	121-113	HemisFair Arena	40–14
55	Mon. Feb. 23	New Jersey Nets	116-103	Hartford Civic Center	41–14
56	Wed. Feb. 25	Portland Trail Blazers	122-116	Boston Garden	42–14
57	Fri. Feb. 27	@ Atlanta Hawks	105-115	The Omni	42–15

March

Game	Date	Opponent	Score	Location	Record
58	Sun. Mar. 1	Detroit Pistons	112-102	Boston Garden	43–15
59	Wed. Mar. 4	Utah Jazz	123-105	Boston Garden	44–15
60	Fri. Mar. 6	Los Angeles Clippers	132-111	Boston Garden	45–15
61	Sun. Mar. 8	@ Detroit Pistons	119-122 (OT)	Pontiac Silverdome	45-16
62	Wed. Mar. 11	Phoenix Suns	118-109	Boston Garden	46-16
63	Fri. Mar. 13	@ Indiana Pacers	109-116	Market Square Arena	46-17
64	Sun. Mar. 15	New York Knicks	113-104	Boston Garden	47-17
65	Tue. Mar. 17	@ Milwaukee Bucks	115-123	Milwaukee Arena (MECCA)	47-18
66	Wed. Mar. 18	Milwaukee Bucks	120-102	Boston Garden	48-18
67	Fri. Mar. 20	Seattle SuperSonics	112-108	Boston Garden	49-18
68	Sun. Mar. 22	New Jersey Nets	116-104	Boston Garden	50-18
69	Tue. Mar. 24	Cleveland Cavaliers	111-88	Hartford Civic Center	51-18
70	Thu. Mar. 26	@ Washington Bullets	103-106	Capital Centre	51-19
71	Fri. Mar. 27	@ Chicago Bulls	111-106	Chicago Stadium	52-19
72	Sun. Mar. 29	Philadelphia 76ers	118-100	Boston Garden	53-19
73	Tue. Mar. 31	@ New York Knicks	120-128	Madison Square Garden	53-20

April

Game	Date	Opponent	Score	Location	Record
74	Wed. Apr. 1	Washington Bullets	103-86	Boston Garden	54-20
75	Fri. Apr. 3	Detroit Pistons	119-115 (OT)	Boston Garden	55-20
76	Sun. Apr. 5	@ Philadelphia 76ers	104-106 (OT)	The Spectrum	55-21
77	Tue. Apr. 7	@ Cleveland Cavaliers	83-107	Richfield Coliseum	55-22
78	Fri. Apr. 10	@ New Jersey Nets	108-117	Brendan Byrne Arena	55-23
79	Sun. Apr. 12	New York Knicks	119-107	Boston Garden	56-23
80	Wed. Apr. 15	@ Indiana Pacers	108-85	Market Square Arena	57-23
81	Fri. Apr. 17	Chicago Bulls	108-105	Boston Garden	58-23
82	Sun. Apr. 19	Atlanta Hawks	118-107	Boston Garden	59-23

1986-87 Schedule

== Roster ==
1986–87 Boston Celtics roster
Players

Pos.	No.	Player	Height	Weight	DOB	From
SG	44	Danny Ainge	6 ft 4 in (1.93 m)	175 lb (79 kg)	1959-03-17	BYU
SF	33	Larry Bird	6 ft 9 in (2.06 m)	220 lb (100 kg)	1956-12-07	Indiana State
SG	34	Rick Carlisle	6 ft 5 in (1.96 m)	210 lb (95 kg)	1959-10-27	Virginia
SF	20	Darren Daye	6 ft 8 in (2.03 m)	220 lb (100 kg)	1960-11-30	UCLA
SG	43	Conner Henry	6 ft 7 in (2.01 m)	195 lb (88 kg)	1963-07-21	UC Santa Barbara
PG	3	Dennis Johnson	6 ft 4 in (1.93 m)	185 lb (84 kg)	1954-09-18	Pepperdine
C	50	Greg Kite	6 ft 11 in (2.11 m)	250 lb (113 kg)	1961-08-05	BYU
PF	32	Kevin McHale	6 ft 10 in (2.08 m)	210 lb (95 kg)	1957-12-19	Minnesota
C	00	Robert Parish	7 ft 0 in (2.13 m)	230 lb (104 kg)	1953-08-30	Centenary
PF	31	Fred Roberts	6 ft 10 in (2.08 m)	218 lb (99 kg)	1960-08-10	BYU
PG	12	Jerry Sichting	6 ft 1 in (1.85 m)	168 lb (76 kg)	1956-11-29	Purdue
PG	11	Sam Vincent	6 ft 2 in (1.88 m)	185 lb (84 kg)	1963-05-18	Michigan State
C	5	Bill Walton	6 ft 11 in (2.11 m)	235 lb (107 kg)	1952-11-05	UCLA
SF	8	Scott Wedman	6 ft 7 in (2.01 m)	215 lb (98 kg)	1952-07-29	Colorado

Coaches
Head coach
- K. C. Jones
Assistant(s)
- Jimmy Rodgers
- Chris Ford

Legend
- (DP) Unsigned draft pick
- (FA) Free agent
- (S) Suspended
- Injured

Roster

== Player stats ==
Note: GP= Games played; REB= Rebounds; AST= Assists; STL = Steals; BLK = Blocks; PTS = Points; AVG = Scoring Average

Player	GP	REB	AST	STL	BLK	PTS	AVG
Larry Bird	74	682	566	135	70	2076	28.1
Kevin McHale	77	763	198	38	172	2008	26.1
Robert Parish	80	851	173	64	144	1403	17.5
Dennis Johnson	79	261	594	87	38	1062	13.4
Danny Ainge	71	242	400	101	14	1053	14.8
Jerry Sichting	78	91	187	40	1	448	5.7
Fred Roberts	73	190	62	22	20	402	5.5
Darren Daye	61	124	75	25	7	236	3.9
Sam Vincent	46	27	59	13	1	171	3.7
Greg Kite	74	169	27	17	46	123	1.7
Conner Henry	36	27	27	6	1	98	2.7
Rick Carlisle	42	30	35	8	0	80	1.9
Bill Walton	10	31	9	1	10	28	2.8
David Thirdkill	17	19	2	2	0	25	1.5
Scott Wedman	6	9	6	2	2	20	3.3
Andre Turner	3	2	1	0	0	4	1.3

== Playoffs ==
1987 playoff game log
First round: 3–0 (home: 2–0; road: 1–0)

Game	Date	Team	Score	High points	High rebounds	High assists	Location Attendance	Series
1	April 23	Chicago	W 108–104	Kevin McHale (21)	Robert Parish (11)	Larry Bird (13)	Boston Garden; 14,890	1–0
2	April 26	Chicago	W 105–96	Larry Bird (29)	McHale, Parish (10)	Larry Bird (8)	Boston Garden; 14,890	2–0
3	April 28	@ Chicago	W 105–94	Larry Bird (32)	Larry Bird (14)	Dennis Johnson (10)	Chicago Stadium; 18,122	3–0

Conference Semi-finals: 4–3 (home: 3–1; road: 1–2)

Game	Date	Team	Score	High points	High rebounds	High assists	Location Attendance	Series
1	May 5	Milwaukee	W 111–98	Larry Bird (40)	Robert Parish (12)	Bird, Johnson (7)	Boston Garden; 14,890	1–0
2	May 6	Milwaukee	W 126–124	Bird, Ainge (30)	Larry Bird (10)	Dennis Johnson (10)	Boston Garden; 14,890	2–0
3	May 8	@ Milwaukee	L 121–126 (OT)	Dennis Johnson (32)	Robert Parish (16)	Dennis Johnson (14)	MECCA Arena; 11,052	2–1
4	May 10	@ Milwaukee	W 138–137 (2OT)	Larry Bird (42)	Kevin McHale (11)	Dennis Johnson (12)	MECCA Arena; 11,052	3–1
5	May 13	Milwaukee	L 124–129	Robert Parish (30)	Robert Parish (16)	Larry Bird (12)	Boston Garden; 14,890	3–2
6	May 15	@ Milwaukee	L 111–121	Dennis Johnson (25)	Kevin McHale (16)	Dennis Johnson (14)	MECCA Arena; 11,052	3–3
7	May 17	Milwaukee	W 119–113	Larry Bird (31)	Robert Parish (19)	Dennis Johnson (10)	Boston Garden; 14,890	4–3

Conference finals: 4–3 (home: 4–0; road: 0–3)

Game	Date	Team	Score	High points	High rebounds	High assists	Location Attendance	Series
1	May 19	Detroit	W 104–91	Robert Parish (31)	Larry Bird (16)	Larry Bird (11)	Boston Garden; 14,890	1–0
2	May 21	Detroit	W 110–101	Larry Bird (31)	Bird, Parish (9)	Larry Bird (12)	Boston Garden; 14,890	2–0
3	May 23	@ Detroit	L 104–122	Sam Vincent (18)	Larry Bird (11)	Dennis Johnson (8)	Pontiac Silverdome; 23,525	2–1
4	May 24	@ Detroit	L 119–145	Sam Vincent (18)	Kevin McHale (9)	Sam Vincent (7)	Pontiac Silverdome; 27,387	2–2
5	May 26	Detroit	W 108–107	Larry Bird (36)	Larry Bird (12)	Larry Bird (9)	Boston Garden; 14,890	3–2
6	May 28	@ Detroit	L 105–113	Larry Bird (35)	Kevin McHale (12)	Dennis Johnson (11)	Pontiac Silverdome; 28,383	3–3
7	May 30	Detroit	W 117–114	Larry Bird (37)	Robert Parish (11)	Dennis Johnson (11)	Boston Garden; 14,890	4–3

NBA Finals: 2–4 (home: 2–1; road: 0–3)

Game	Date	Team	Score	High points	High rebounds	High assists	Location Attendance	Series
1	June 2	@ L.A. Lakers	L 113–126	Larry Bird (32)	Larry Bird (7)	Dennis Johnson (13)	The Forum; 17,505	0–1
2	June 4	@ L.A. Lakers	L 122–141	Larry Bird (23)	Robert Parish (14)	Dennis Johnson (9)	The Forum; 17,505	0–2
3	June 7	L.A. Lakers	W 109–103	Larry Bird (30)	Larry Bird (12)	Ainge, McHale (5)	Boston Garden; 14,890	1–2
4	June 9	L.A. Lakers	L 106–107	Kevin McHale (25)	Kevin McHale (13)	Dennis Johnson (14)	Boston Garden; 14,890	1–3
5	June 11	L.A. Lakers	W 123–108	Dennis Johnson (25)	Kevin McHale (14)	Dennis Johnson (11)	Boston Garden; 14,890	2–3
6	June 14	@ L.A. Lakers	L 93–106	Dennis Johnson (33)	Johnson, McHale (10)	Danny Ainge (6)	The Forum; 17,505	2–4

1987 schedule

== Award winners ==
- Larry Bird, All-NBA First Team
- Kevin McHale, All-NBA First Team
- Kevin McHale, All-NBA Defensive First Team
