= 1986–87 Atlanta Hawks season =

Season of National Basketball Association team the Atlanta Hawks

- Division champions
- Head coach: Mike Fratello
- General manager: Stan Kasten
- Owners: Ted Turner / Turner Broadcasting System
- Arena: Omni Coliseum

Results
- Record: 57–25 (.695)
- Place: Division: 1st (Central); Conference: 2nd (Eastern)
- Playoff finish: Conference semifinals (lost to Pistons 1–4)
- Stats at Basketball Reference

Local media
- Television: WGNX
- Radio: WSB

The 1986–87 Atlanta Hawks season was the Hawks' 38th season in the NBA and their 19th season in the city of Atlanta. The Hawks finished first place in the Central Division with a franchise-best record of 57–25. Dominique Wilkins made the All-NBA Second Team, and was selected for the 1987 NBA All-Star Game. In the first round of the playoffs, the Hawks defeated the Indiana Pacers in four games, but lost in five games to the 3rd-seeded Detroit Pistons in the semifinals.

== Draft picks ==
Round	Pick	Player	Position	Nationality	College
1	19	Billy Thompson	SF	United States	Louisville
2	32	Cedric Henderson	PF/SF	United States	Georgia
2	40	Augusto Binelli	C	Italy	
2	42	Ron Kellogg	SF	United States	Kansas
3	65	Dave Hoppen	C/PF	United States	Nebraska
3	70	Jim Les	G	United States	Bradley
4	88	Efrem Winters	PF	United States	Illinois
5	111	Nicky Jones		United States	Virginia Commonwealth
6	134	Alexander Volkov	PF	Ukraine	
7	157	Valerie Tikhonenko		Russia	

== Roster ==
1986–87 Atlanta Hawks roster
Players

Pos.	No.	Player	Height	Weight	DOB	From
SG	12	John Battle	6 ft 2 in (1.88 m)	175 lb (79 kg)	1962-11-09	Rutgers
PF	33	Antoine Carr	6 ft 9 in (2.06 m)	225 lb (102 kg)	1961-07-23	Wichita State
PF	44	Scott Hastings	6 ft 10 in (2.08 m)	235 lb (107 kg)	1960-06-03	Arkansas
C	32	Jon Koncak	7 ft 0 in (2.13 m)	250 lb (113 kg)	1963-05-17	SMU
PF	53	Cliff Levingston	6 ft 8 in (2.03 m)	210 lb (95 kg)	1961-01-04	Wichita State
SF	40	Mike McGee	6 ft 5 in (1.96 m)	190 lb (86 kg)	1959-07-29	Michigan
PG	25	Doc Rivers	6 ft 4 in (1.93 m)	185 lb (84 kg)	1961-10-13	Marquette
C	30	Tree Rollins	7 ft 1 in (2.16 m)	235 lb (107 kg)	1955-06-16	Clemson
PG	4	Spud Webb	5 ft 6 in (1.68 m)	133 lb (60 kg)	1963-07-13	NC State
SF	21	Dominique Wilkins	6 ft 7 in (2.01 m)	200 lb (91 kg)	1960-01-12	Georgia
SG	1	Gus Williams	6 ft 2 in (1.88 m)	175 lb (79 kg)	1953-10-10	USC
PF	42	Kevin Willis	7 ft 0 in (2.13 m)	220 lb (100 kg)	1962-09-06	Michigan State
SG	10	Randy Wittman	6 ft 6 in (1.98 m)	210 lb (95 kg)	1959-10-28	Indiana

Coaches
Head coach
- Mike Fratello
Assistant(s)
- Brian Hill
- Willis Reed
- Brendan Suhr

Legend
- (DP) Unsigned draft pick
- (FA) Free agent
- (S) Suspended
- Injured

Roster
Updated: February 14, 1987

== Regular season ==
=== Season standings ===
Central Division	W	L	PCT	GB	Home	Road	Div
y-Atlanta Hawks	57	25	.695	–	35–6	22–19	17–13
x-Detroit Pistons	52	30	.634	5	32–9	20–21	17–13
x-Milwaukee Bucks	50	32	.610	7	32–9	18–23	17–13
x-Indiana Pacers	41	41	.500	16	28–13	13–28	13–16
x-Chicago Bulls	40	42	.488	17	29–12	11–30	17–12
Cleveland Cavaliers	31	51	.378	26	25–16	6–35	8–22

#	Eastern Conference				
#	Team	W	L	PCT	GB
1	c-Boston Celtics	59	23	.720	–
2	y-Atlanta Hawks	57	25	.695	2
3	x-Detroit Pistons	52	30	.634	7
4	x-Milwaukee Bucks	50	32	.610	9
5	x-Philadelphia 76ers	45	37	.549	14
6	x-Washington Bullets	42	40	.512	17
7	x-Indiana Pacers	41	41	.500	18
8	x-Chicago Bulls	40	42	.488	19
9	Cleveland Cavaliers	31	51	.378	28
10	New Jersey Nets	24	58	.293	35
11	New York Knicks	24	58	.293	35

Notes

- z, y – division champions
- x – clinched playoff spot

== Game log ==
=== Regular season ===
1986–87 game log
Total: 57–25 (home: 35–6; road: 22–19)
November: 12–3 (home: 6–0; road: 6–3)

Game	Date	Team	Score	High points	High rebounds	High assists	Location Attendance	Record

December: 8–4 (home: 5–1; road: 3–3)

Game	Date	Team	Score	High points	High rebounds	High assists	Location Attendance	Record

January: 8–8 (home: 7–2; road: 1–6)

Game	Date	Team	Score	High points	High rebounds	High assists	Location Attendance	Record

February: 7–6 (home: 5–2; road: 2–4)

Game	Date	Team	Score	High points	High rebounds	High assists	Location Attendance	Record

March: 13–2 (home: 6–1; road: 7–1)

Game	Date	Team	Score	High points	High rebounds	High assists	Location Attendance	Record

April: 9–2 (home: 6–0; road: 3–2)

Game	Date	Team	Score	High points	High rebounds	High assists	Location Attendance	Record

1986–87 schedule

=== Playoffs ===
1987 playoff game log
First Round: 3–1 (home: 2–0; road: 1–1)

Game	Date	Team	Score	High points	High rebounds	High assists	Location Attendance	Series
1	April 24	Indiana	W 110–94	Dominique Wilkins (35)	Tree Rollins (11)	Spud Webb (9)	Omni Coliseum; 16,522	0–1
2	April 26	Indiana	W 94–93	Dominique Wilkins (43)	Kevin Willis (10)	Spud Webb (14)	Omni Coliseum; 16,522	0–2
3	April 29	@ Indiana	L 87–96	Dominique Wilkins (22)	Kevin Willis (7)	Doc Rivers (10)	Market Square Arena; 12,303	2–1
4	May 1	@ Indiana	W 101–97	Dominique Wilkins (30)	Dominique Wilkins (9)	Doc Rivers (15)	Market Square Arena; 14,039	3–1

Conference semifinals: 1–4 (home: 1–2; road: 0–2)

Game	Date	Team	Score	High points	High rebounds	High assists	Location Attendance	Series
1	May 3	Detroit	L 111–112	Kevin Willis (22)	Kevin Willis (10)	Doc Rivers (14)	Omni Coliseum; 14,361	0–1
2	May 5	Detroit	W 115–102	Randy Wittman (34)	Kevin Willis (10)	Doc Rivers (14)	Omni Coliseum; 16,522	1–1
3	May 8	@ Detroit	L 99–108	Kevin Willis (26)	Kevin Willis (12)	Doc Rivers (8)	Pontiac Silverdome; 24,544	1–2
4	May 10	@ Detroit	L 88–89	Wilkins, Battle (19)	Dominique Wilkins (12)	Doc Rivers (7)	Pontiac Silverdome; 17,269	1–3
5	May 13	Detroit	L 96–104	Dominique Wilkins (26)	Dominique Wilkins (12)	Doc Rivers (15)	Omni Coliseum; 16,522	1–4

1987 schedule

== Player statistics ==
Legend
GP	Games played	GS	Games started	MPG	Minutes per game
FG%	Field-goal percentage	3P%	3-point field-goal percentage	FT%	Free-throw percentage
RPG	Rebounds per game	APG	Assists per game	SPG	Steals per game
BPG	Blocks per game	PPG	Points per game

=== Season ===
Player	GP	GS	MPG	FG%	3FG%	FT%	RPG	APG	SPG	BPG	PPG
Dominique Wilkins	79	79	37.6	46.3	29.2	81.8	6.3	3.3	1.5	0.6	29.0
Kevin Willis	81	81	32.4	53.6	25.0	70.9	10.5	0.8	0.8	0.8	16.1
Doc Rivers	82	82	31.6	45.1	19.0	82.8	3.6	10.0	2.1	0.4	12.8
Randy Wittman	71	65	28.9	50.3	33.3	78.7	1.7	3.0	0.5	0.2	12.7
Mike McGee	76	6	18.7	45.9	37.6	58.4	2.1	2.0	0.8	0.0	10.4
Cliff Levingston	82	10	22.5	50.6	0.0	73.1	6.5	0.5	0.6	0.8	8.0
Spud Webb	33	0	16.1	43.8	16.7	76.2	1.8	5.1	1.0	0.1	6.8
John Battle	64	8	12.6	45.7	0.0	73.8	0.9	1.9	0.5	0.1	6.0
Jon Koncak	82	19	20.5	48.0	0.0	65.4	6.0	0.4	0.6	0.9	5.6
Tree Rollins	75	58	23.5	54.6	0.0	72.4	6.5	0.3	0.6	1.9	5.4
Antoine Carr	65	2	10.7	50.6	33.3	70.9	2.4	0.5	0.2	0.7	5.3
Gus Williams	33	0	14.6	36.3	27.8	67.5	1.2	4.2	0.5	0.2	4.2
Scott Hastings	40	0	6.4	33.8	16.7	79.3	1.8	0.3	0.3	0.2	1.8
Cedric Henderson	6	0	1.7	40.0	0.0	100.0	0.5	0.0	0.0	0.0	0.8
Michael Wilson	2	0	1.0	0.0	0.0	0.0	0.0	0.5	0.0	0.0	0.0

=== Playoffs ===
Player	GP	GS	MPG	FG%	3FG%	FT%	RPG	APG	SPG	BPG	PPG
Dominique Wilkins	9	9	40.0	41.0	30.0	89.2	7.8	2.8	1.8	0.9	26.8
Randy Wittman	9	9	33.3	55.4	0.0	82.4	2.0	3.3	0.4	0.4	16.4
Kevin Willis	9	9	39.6	52.2	0.0	67.7	9.2	0.7	1.0	0.8	15.7
Antoine Carr	9	0	18.0	69.6	0.0	81.3	3.0	1.4	0.3	0.9	11.6
Doc Rivers	8	8	30.6	38.3	0.0	50.0	3.4	11.3	1.1	0.4	7.8
John Battle	8	0	9.8	44.1	40.0	91.3	1.3	1.0	0.1	0.0	6.6
Tree Rollins	9	9	24.6	53.6	0.0	71.4	5.9	0.3	0.3	1.8	4.4
Spud Webb	8	1	15.3	47.4	0.0	76.5	1.0	4.8	0.8	0.0	3.9
Mike McGee	8	0	12.6	25.6	14.3	50.0	2.5	1.9	0.5	0.0	3.4
Cliff Levingston	9	0	12.0	38.9	0.0	77.8	3.8	0.3	0.0	0.3	3.1
Jon Koncak	8	0	10.8	53.8	0.0	75.0	3.1	0.4	0.4	0.5	2.5
Scott Hastings	4	0	5.3	66.7	0.0	100.0	1.5	0.0	0.3	0.3	1.5

Player statistics citation:

== Awards and records ==
- Stan Kasten, NBA Executive of the Year Award
- Dominique Wilkins, All-NBA Second Team

== See also ==
- 1986-87 NBA season
