= Scooter McCray =

American basketball player and coach (born 1960)

Personal information
- Born: February 8, 1960 (age 66) Mount Vernon, New York, U.S.
- Listed height: 6 ft 9 in (2.06 m)
- Listed weight: 215 lb (98 kg)

Career information
- High school: Mount Vernon (Mount Vernon, New York)
- College: Louisville (1978–1983)
- NBA draft: 1983: 2nd round, 36th overall pick
- Drafted by: Seattle SuperSonics
- Playing career: 1983–1988
- Position: Small forward / shooting guard
- Number: 21, 20

Career history
- 1983–1984: Seattle SuperSonics
- 1985–1986: Caen Basket Calvados
- 1986–1987: Cleveland Cavaliers
- 1987–1988: Charleston Gunners

Career highlights
- NCAA champion (1980); McDonald's All-American (1978); Fourth-team Parade All-American (1978)
- Stats at NBA.com
- Stats at Basketball Reference

Carlton Lamont "Scooter" McCray (born February 8, 1960) is an American former professional basketball player. He had a career in the National Basketball Association (NBA) from 1983 to 1987. He was selected large-school player of the year in 1978 by the New York State Sportswriters Association after his senior season at Mount Vernon High School. His younger brother Rodney, with whom he played alongside for the Cardinals at the University of Louisville, also played in the NBA, for ten seasons.

After he retired, McCray became an assistant coach for the Louisville men's basketball team.

== Career statistics ==
Legend
GP	Games played	GS	Games started	MPG	Minutes per game
FG%	Field goal percentage	3P%	3-point field goal percentage	FT%	Free throw percentage
RPG	Rebounds per game	APG	Assists per game	SPG	Steals per game
BPG	Blocks per game	PPG	Points per game	**Bold**	Career high

=== NBA ===
==== Regular season ====
Year	Team	GP	GS	MPG	FG%	3P%	FT%	RPG	APG	SPG	BPG	PPG
1983–84	Seattle	**47**	**6**	11.1	.388	–	.700	2.4	.9	.2	.4	2.7
1984–85	Seattle	6	0	**15.5**	**.600**	–	**.750**	**2.8**	**1.2**	.2	**.5**	2.5
1986–87	Cleveland	24	2	11.6	.462	–	.488	2.4	1.0	**.4**	.2	**3.3**
Career		77	8	11.6	.423	–	.611	2.5	1.0	.3	.3	2.9

==== Playoffs ====
Year	Team	GP	MPG	FG%	3P%	FT%	RPG	APG	SPG	BPG	PPG
1984	Seattle	4	9.5	.667	.000	.000	1.5	.8	.3	.0	2.0
