= 1986–87 Washington Bullets season =

NBA professional basketball team season

- Head coach: Kevin Loughery
- General manager: Bob Ferry
- Owner: Abe Pollin
- Arena: Capital Centre

Results
- Record: 42–40 (.512)
- Place: Division: 3rd (Atlantic); Conference: 6th (Eastern)
- Playoff finish: First round (lost to Pistons 0–3)
- Stats at Basketball Reference

Local media
- Television: WDCA; Home Team Sports
- Radio: WTOP

The 1986–87 Washington Bullets season was the Bullets 26th season in the NBA and their 14th season in the city of Washington, D.C.

== Draft picks ==
Round	Pick	Player	Position	Nationality	College
1	12	John Williams	PF/C	United States	Louisiana State
1	21	Anthony Jones	SG/SF	United States	Nevada-Las Vegas
2	36	Steve Mitchell	PG	United States	Alabama-Birmingham
3	58	David Henderson	PG	United States	Duke
4	82	Barry Mungar	F	United States	St. Bonaventure
5	104	Paul Fortier		United States	Washington
6	128	Lorenzo Duncan		United States	Sam Houston State
7	150	Joe Price		United States	Notre Dame

== Roster ==
1986–87 Washington Bullets roster
Players

Pos.	No.	Player	Height	Weight	DOB	From
PG	14	Michael Adams	5 ft 10 in (1.78 m)	162 lb (73 kg)	1963-01-19	Boston College
C	10	Manute Bol	7 ft 7 in (2.31 m)	200 lb (91 kg)	1962-10-16	Bridgeport
PF	33	Terry Catledge	6 ft 8 in (2.03 m)	220 lb (100 kg)	1963-08-22	South Alabama
SG	12	Darwin Cook	6 ft 3 in (1.91 m)	184 lb (83 kg)	1958-08-06	Portland
PG	15	Frank Johnson	6 ft 1 in (1.85 m)	185 lb (84 kg)	1958-11-23	Wake Forest
PF	23	Charles Jones	6 ft 9 in (2.06 m)	215 lb (98 kg)	1957-04-03	Albany State
SG	24	Jeff Malone	6 ft 4 in (1.93 m)	205 lb (93 kg)	1961-06-28	Mississippi State
C	4	Moses Malone	6 ft 10 in (2.08 m)	215 lb (98 kg)	1955-03-23	Petersburg HS (VA)
PF	42	Jay Murphy	6 ft 9 in (2.06 m)	220 lb (100 kg)	1962-06-26	Boston College
PF	5	Dan Roundfield	6 ft 8 in (2.03 m)	205 lb (93 kg)	1953-05-26	Central Michigan
SF	31	Jay Vincent	6 ft 7 in (2.01 m)	220 lb (100 kg)	1959-06-10	Michigan State
PG	2	Ennis Whatley	6 ft 3 in (1.91 m)	177 lb (80 kg)	1962-08-11	Alabama
SF	34	John Williams	6 ft 8 in (2.03 m)	235 lb (107 kg)	1966-10-26	LSU

Coaches
Head coach
- Kevin Loughery
Assistant(s)
- Bill Blair
- Fred Carter

Legend
- (DP) Unsigned draft pick
- (FA) Free agent
- (S) Suspended
- Injured

Roster
Updated: February 26, 1987

== Regular season ==
=== Season standings ===
Atlantic Division	W	L	PCT	GB	Home	Road	Div
y-Boston Celtics	59	23	.720	–	39–2	20–21	15–9
x-Philadelphia 76ers	45	37	.549	14	28–13	17–24	12–12
x-Washington Bullets	42	40	.512	17	27–14	15–26	13–11
New Jersey Nets	24	58	.293	35	19–22	5–36	12–12
New York Knicks	24	58	.293	35	18–23	6–35	8–16

#	Eastern Conference				
#	Team	W	L	PCT	GB
1	c-Boston Celtics	59	23	.720	–
2	y-Atlanta Hawks	57	25	.695	2
3	x-Detroit Pistons	52	30	.634	7
4	x-Milwaukee Bucks	50	32	.610	9
5	x-Philadelphia 76ers	45	37	.549	14
6	x-Washington Bullets	42	40	.512	17
7	x-Indiana Pacers	41	41	.500	18
8	x-Chicago Bulls	40	42	.488	19
9	Cleveland Cavaliers	31	51	.378	28
10	New Jersey Nets	24	58	.293	35
11	New York Knicks	24	58	.293	35

Notes

- z, y – division champions
- x – clinched playoff spot

== Game log ==
=== Regular season ===
1986–87 game log
Total: 42–40 (home: 27–14; road: 15–26)
October: 0–1 (home: 0–0; road: 0–1)

Game	Date	Team	Score	High points	High rebounds	High assists	Location Attendance	Record
1	October 31	@ Boston	L 102–120				Boston Garden	0–1

November: 7–7 (home: 7–1; road: 0–6)

Game	Date	Team	Score	High points	High rebounds	High assists	Location Attendance	Record
2	November 1	@ Cleveland	L 106–113				Richfield Coliseum	0–2
3	November 4	New Jersey	W 102–101				Capital Centre	1–2
4	November 5	@ Detroit	L 96–97				Pontiac Silverdome	1–3
5	November 7	Boston	L 86–88				Capital Centre	1–4
6	November 8	@ Atlanta	L 91–110				The Omni	1–5
7	November 12	Chicago	W 101–99				Capital Centre	2–5
8	November 15	@ New York	L 97–104				Madison Square Garden	2–6
9	November 16	Indiana	W 124–111				Capital Centre	3–6
10	November 19	Detroit	W 119–105				Capital Centre	4–6
11	November 21	Houston	W 115–99				Capital Centre	5–6
12	November 22	@ Chicago	L 84–93				Chicago Stadium	5–7
13	November 25	Portland	W 111–99				Capital Centre	6–7
14	November 26	@ Milwaukee	L 103–122				MECCA Arena	6–8
15	November 29	San Antonio	W 116–103				Capital Centre	7–8

December: 7–7 (home: 2–4; road: 5–3)

Game	Date	Team	Score	High points	High rebounds	High assists	Location Attendance	Record
16	December 2	@ Boston	W 117–109				Hartford Civic Center	8–8
17	December 3	@ Indiana	L 103–116				Market Square Arena	8–9
18	December 5	Milwaukee	L 87–91				Capital Centre	8–10
19	December 10	New York	W 106–105				Capital Centre	9–10
20	December 12	@ Detroit	W 116–115				Pontiac Silverdome	10–10
21	December 13	Boston	L 98–105				Capital Centre	10–11
22	December 16	Utah	L 106–109				Capital Centre	10–12
23	December 18	@ Golden State	W 128–110				Oakland–Alameda County Coliseum Arena	11–12
24	December 20	@ L.A. Clippers	W 113–101				Los Angeles Memorial Sports Arena	12–12
25	December 21	@ Portland	L 101–128				Memorial Coliseum	12–13
26	December 25	@ Philadelphia	W 102–97				The Spectrum	13–13
27	December 27	Detroit	L 105–107				Capital Centre	13–14
28	December 29	Golden State	W 125–105				Capital Centre	14–14
29	December 30	@ New York	L 97–103				Madison Square Garden	14–15

January: 8–6 (home: 6–2; road: 2–4)

Game	Date	Team	Score	High points	High rebounds	High assists	Location Attendance	Record
30	January 2	Atlanta	L 101–118				Capital Centre	14–16
31	January 6	L.A. Clippers	W 112–97				Capital Centre	15–16
32	January 7	@ New Jersey	L 96–118				Brendan Byrne Arena	15–17
33	January 9	@ Milwaukee	W 100–92				MECCA Arena	16–17
34	January 10	Philadelphia	W 117–111				Capital Centre	17–17
35	January 12	Sacramento	W 113–109				Capital Centre	18–17
36	January 14	New Jersey	W 118–100				Capital Centre	19–17
37	January 15	@ Indiana	L 105–113				Market Square Arena	19–18
38	January 18	L.A. Lakers	L 101–115				Capital Centre	19–19
39	January 23	Phoenix	W 109–90				Capital Centre	20–19
40	January 24	@ Houston	L 92–115				The Summit	20–20
41	January 27	@ Dallas	W 118–113				Reunion Arena	21–20
42	January 29	@ Detroit	L 101–112				Pontiac Silverdome	21–21
43	January 31	Philadelphia	W 106–105				Capital Centre	22–21

February: 9–4 (home: 4–0; road: 5–4)

Game	Date	Team	Score	High points	High rebounds	High assists	Location Attendance	Record
44	February 2	New York	W 104–98				Capital Centre	23–21
45	February 3	@ Chicago	L 91–98				Chicago Stadium	23–22
46	February 5	Cleveland	W 94–85				Capital Centre	24–22
47	February 11	@ San Antonio	W 133–108				HemisFair Arena	25–22
48	February 12	@ Denver	W 121–115				McNichols Sports Arena	26–22
49	February 14	@ Sacramento	L 111–136				ARCO Arena	26–23
50	February 16	@ Phoenix	W 124–110				Arizona Veterans Memorial Coliseum	27–23
51	February 17	@ L.A. Lakers	W 114–99				The Forum	28–23
52	February 20	@ Utah	W 118–113				Salt Palace	29–23
53	February 21	@ Seattle	L 93–110				Seattle Center Coliseum	29–24
54	February 23	@ Cleveland	L 105–109				Richfield Coliseum	29–25
55	February 26	Indiana	W 100–94				Capital Centre	30–25
56	February 28	New York	W 106–105				Capital Centre	31–25

March: 5–10 (home: 5–4; road: 0–6)

Game	Date	Team	Score	High points	High rebounds	High assists	Location Attendance	Record
57	March 2	@ Atlanta	L 99–121				The Omni	31–26
58	March 4	New Jersey	W 117–114				Capital Centre	32–26
59	March 6	@ Philadelphia	L 113–123				The Spectrum	32–27
60	March 10	@ New Jersey	L 79–121				Brendan Byrne Arena	32–28
61	March 11	Milwaukee	L 107–115				Capital Centre	32–29
62	March 14	Chicago	W 106–105 (OT)				Capital Centre	33–29
63	March 15	Cleveland	W 97–89				Capital Centre	34–29
64	March 17	@ Atlanta	L 98–118				The Omni	34–30
65	March 19	Seattle	W 110–106				Capital Centre	35–30
66	March 21	Denver	L 107–117				Capital Centre	35–31
67	March 23	@ Indiana	L 92–101				Market Square Arena	35–32
68	March 24	Atlanta	L 87–96				Capital Centre	35–33
69	March 26	Boston	W 106–103				Capital Centre	36–33
70	March 28	Dallas	L 107–114				Capital Centre	36–34
71	March 31	@ Chicago	L 75–101				Chicago Stadium	36–35

April: 6–5 (home: 3–3; road: 3–2)

Game	Date	Team	Score	High points	High rebounds	High assists	Location Attendance	Record
72	April 1	@ Boston	L 86–103				Boston Garden	36–36
73	April 3	Chicago	W 122–118				Capital Centre	37–36
74	April 4	@ Cleveland	W 127–111				Richfield Coliseum	38–36
75	April 7	Milwaukee	L 94–95				Capital Centre	38–37
76	April 8	@ New Jersey	W 118–109				Brendan Byrne Arena	39–37
77	April 10	Indiana	L 101–115				Capital Centre	39–38
78	April 12	Detroit	W 103–98				Capital Centre	40–38
79	April 13	@ Philadelphia	L 105–113				The Spectrum	40–39
80	April 15	Cleveland	W 110–101				Capital Centre	41–39
81	April 17	@ New York	W 142–110				Madison Square Garden	42–39
82	April 19	Philadelphia	L 102–108				Capital Centre	42–40

1986–87 schedule

=== Playoffs ===
1987 playoff game log
First Round: 0–3 (home: 0–1; road: 0–2)

Game	Date	Team	Score	High points	High rebounds	High assists	Location Attendance	Series
1	April 24	@ Detroit	L 92–106	Terry Catledge (24)	Malone, Catledge (12)	Moses Malone (3)	Pontiac Silverdome; 15,419	0–1
2	April 26	@ Detroit	L 85–128	Terry Catledge (19)	Moses Malone (10)	Ennis Whatley (4)	Pontiac Silverdome; 14,389	0–2
3	April 29	Detroit	L 96–97	Moses Malone (31)	Moses Malone (16)	Michael Adams (8)	Capital Centre; 10,831	0–3

1987 schedule

== See also ==
- 1986-87 NBA season
