= 1986–87 New Jersey Nets season =

NBA professional basketball team season

- Head coach: Dave Wohl
- Arena: Brendan Byrne Arena

Results
- Record: 24–58 (.293)
- Place: Division: 4th (Atlantic); Conference: 10th (Eastern)
- Playoff finish: Did not qualify
- Stats at Basketball Reference

Local media
- Television: WOR-TV; SportsChannel New York
- Radio: WNEW

The 1986–87 New Jersey Nets season was the Nets' 11th season in the NBA.

== Draft picks ==
Round	Pick	Player	Position	Nationality	College
1	13	Dwayne Washington	PG	United States	Syracuse
4	81	Steve Hale		United States	North Carolina
5	105	Archie Johnson		United States	Alabama-Birmingham
6	127	Troy Webster		United States	George Washington
7	151	Jim Dolan		United States	Notre Dame

== Roster ==
1986–87 New Jersey Nets roster
Players

Pos.	No.	Player	Height	Weight	DOB	From
F	2	James Bailey	6 ft 9 in (2.06 m)	220 lb (100 kg)	1957-05-21	Rutgers
G	10	Otis Birdsong	6 ft 3 in (1.91 m)	190 lb (86 kg)	1955-12-09	Houston
G/F	35	Tony Brown	6 ft 6 in (1.98 m)	185 lb (84 kg)	1960-07-29	Arkansas
F/C	40	Ben Coleman	6 ft 9 in (2.06 m)	235 lb (107 kg)	1961-11-14	Maryland
C	53	Darryl Dawkins	6 ft 11 in (2.11 m)	251 lb (114 kg)	1957-01-11	Maynard Evans HS (FL)
C	50	Chris Engler	6 ft 11 in (2.11 m)	245 lb (111 kg)	1959-03-01	Wyoming
C	42	Mike Gminski	6 ft 11 in (2.11 m)	250 lb (113 kg)	1959-08-03	Duke
F	55	Albert King	6 ft 6 in (1.98 m)	190 lb (86 kg)	1959-12-17	Maryland
G	12	Kevin McKenna	6 ft 5 in (1.96 m)	195 lb (88 kg)	1959-01-08	Creighton
F	30	Jeff Turner	6 ft 9 in (2.06 m)	230 lb (104 kg)	1962-04-09	Vanderbilt
G	1	Dwayne Washington	6 ft 2 in (1.88 m)	190 lb (86 kg)	1964-01-06	Syracuse
F	52	Buck Williams	6 ft 8 in (2.03 m)	215 lb (98 kg)	1960-03-08	Maryland
G	13	Ray Williams	6 ft 3 in (1.91 m)	188 lb (85 kg)	1954-10-14	Minnesota
G	33	Leon Wood	6 ft 3 in (1.91 m)	185 lb (84 kg)	1962-03-25	Cal State Fullerton
F	0	Orlando Woolridge	6 ft 9 in (2.06 m)	215 lb (98 kg)	1959-12-16	Notre Dame

Coaches
Head coach
- Dave Wohl
Assistant(s)
- Bob MacKinnon
- Garry St. Jean

Legend
- (DP) Unsigned draft pick
- (FA) Free agent
- (S) Suspended
- Injured

Roster

== Regular season ==
=== Season standings ===
Atlantic Division	W	L	PCT	GB	Home	Road	Div
y-Boston Celtics	59	23	.720	–	39–2	20–21	15–9
x-Philadelphia 76ers	45	37	.549	14	28–13	17–24	12–12
x-Washington Bullets	42	40	.512	17	27–14	15–26	13–11
New Jersey Nets	24	58	.293	35	19–22	5–36	12–12
New York Knicks	24	58	.293	35	18–23	6–35	8–16

#	Eastern Conference				
#	Team	W	L	PCT	GB
1	c-Boston Celtics	59	23	.720	–
2	y-Atlanta Hawks	57	25	.695	2
3	x-Detroit Pistons	52	30	.634	7
4	x-Milwaukee Bucks	50	32	.610	9
5	x-Philadelphia 76ers	45	37	.549	14
6	x-Washington Bullets	42	40	.512	17
7	x-Indiana Pacers	41	41	.500	18
8	x-Chicago Bulls	40	42	.488	19
9	Cleveland Cavaliers	31	51	.378	28
10	New Jersey Nets	24	58	.293	35
11	New York Knicks	24	58	.293	35

== Player statistics ==
Legend
GP	Games played	GS	Games started	MPG	Minutes per game
FG%	Field-goal percentage	3P%	3-point field-goal percentage	FT%	Free-throw percentage
RPG	Rebounds per game	APG	Assists per game	SPG	Steals per game
BPG	Blocks per game	PPG	Points per game

== See also ==
- 1986–87 NBA season
