= 1986–87 Milwaukee Bucks season =

NBA professional basketball team season

- Head coach: Don Nelson
- General manager: Don Nelson
- Owner: Herb Kohl
- Arena: MECCA Arena

Results
- Record: 50–32 (.610)
- Place: Division: 3rd (Central); Conference: 4th (Eastern)
- Playoff finish: Conference semifinals (lost to Celtics 3–4)
- Stats at Basketball Reference

The 1986-87 Milwaukee Bucks season was the Bucks' 19th season in the NBA. For the first time since 1978-79, the Bucks did not win their division.

During the season, coach and general manager Don Nelson started to experience a rift in friendship with Bucks owner Herb Kohl due to personal disagreements with Kohl on how to run the team. During Game 4 of the 1987 Eastern Conference semifinals between the Bucks and the Boston Celtics, Nelson controversially announced to the local and national sports media that he did not expect to return to the Bucks after the season was over due to said rift with Kohl. Nelson would in fact resign after the Bucks lost the series to Boston in seven games, coming back from being down 3–1 in the series only to lose the seventh and deciding game in Boston Garden. After 11 seasons coaching and managing the Bucks, Nelson took the year off only to return in the 1988–89 season as coach and manager of the Golden State Warriors. The Bucks hired Nelson's assistant coach, Del Harris, to take over the team for the 1987–88 season.

== Draft picks ==
Round	Pick	Player	Position	Nationality	College
1	22	Scott Skiles	PG	United States	Michigan State
2	45	Keith Smith	SG	United States	Loyola Marymount
3	68	Baskerville Holmes	PF	United States	Memphis
5	114	Bobby Deaton		United States	Southwestern
6	137	John Kimbrell		United States	Lipscomb
7	160	Jeff Strong		United States	Missouri

== Roster ==
1986–87 Milwaukee Bucks roster
Players

Pos.	No.	Player	Height	Weight	DOB	From
SG	24	Dudley Bradley	6 ft 6 in (1.98 m)	195 lb (88 kg)	1957–03–19	North Carolina
C	45	Randy Breuer	7 ft 3 in (2.21 m)	230 lb (104 kg)	1960–10–11	Minnesota
SF	2	Junior Bridgeman	6 ft 5 in (1.96 m)	210 lb (95 kg)	1953–09–17	Louisville
F	34	Terry Cummings	6 ft 9 in (2.06 m)	220 lb (100 kg)	1961–03–15	DePaul
PF	40	Jerome Henderson	6 ft 11 in (2.11 m)	230 lb (104 kg)	1959–10–05	New Mexico
PG	15	Craig Hodges	6 ft 2 in (1.88 m)	190 lb (86 kg)	1960–06–27	Long Beach State
G	10	John Lucas	6 ft 3 in (1.91 m)	175 lb (79 kg)	1953–10–31	Maryland
C	44	Paul Mokeski	7 ft 0 in (2.13 m)	250 lb (113 kg)	1957–01–03	Kansas
G	4	Sidney Moncrief	6 ft 3 in (1.91 m)	180 lb (82 kg)	1957–09–21	Arkansas
G	22	Ricky Pierce	6 ft 4 in (1.93 m)	205 lb (93 kg)	1959–08–19	Rice
F	25	Paul Pressey	6 ft 5 in (1.96 m)	185 lb (84 kg)	1958–12–24	Tulsa
G/F	35	Jerry Reynolds	6 ft 8 in (2.03 m)	200 lb (91 kg)	1962–12–23	LSU
C	43	Jack Sikma	6 ft 11 in (2.11 m)	230 lb (104 kg)	1955–11–14	Illinois Wesleyan
PG	5	Scott Skiles	6 ft 1 in (1.85 m)	180 lb (82 kg)	1964–03–05	Michigan State
G	11	Keith Smith	6 ft 3 in (1.91 m)	180 lb (82 kg)	1964–03–09	Loyola Marymount

Coaches
Head coach
- Don Nelson
Assistant(s)
- Del Harris

Legend
- (DP) Unsigned draft pick
- (FA) Free agent
- (S) Suspended
- Injured

== Regular season ==
=== Season standings ===
Central Division	W	L	PCT	GB	Home	Road	Div
y-Atlanta Hawks	57	25	.695	–	35–6	22–19	17–13
x-Detroit Pistons	52	30	.634	5	32–9	20–21	17–13
x-Milwaukee Bucks	50	32	.610	7	32–9	18–23	17–13
x-Indiana Pacers	41	41	.500	16	28–13	13–28	13–16
x-Chicago Bulls	40	42	.488	17	29–12	11–30	17–12
Cleveland Cavaliers	31	51	.378	26	25–16	6–35	8–22

#	Eastern Conference				
#	Team	W	L	PCT	GB
1	c-Boston Celtics	59	23	.720	–
2	y-Atlanta Hawks	57	25	.695	2
3	x-Detroit Pistons	52	30	.634	7
4	x-Milwaukee Bucks	50	32	.610	9
5	x-Philadelphia 76ers	45	37	.549	14
6	x-Washington Bullets	42	40	.512	17
7	x-Indiana Pacers	41	41	.500	18
8	x-Chicago Bulls	40	42	.488	19
9	Cleveland Cavaliers	31	51	.378	28
10	New Jersey Nets	24	58	.293	35
11	New York Knicks	24	58	.293	35

z - clinched division title
y - clinched division title
x - clinched playoff spot

=== Game log ===
1986–87 game log
Total: 50–32 (home: 1–0; road: 1–0)
October: 1–0 (home: 0–0; road: 1–0)

Game	Date	Team	Score	High points	High rebounds	High assists	Location Attendance	Record
1	October 31, 1986	@ Detroit	W 120–104				Pontiac Silverdome	1–0

November: 1–0 (home: 1–0; road: 0–0)

Game	Date	Team	Score	High points	High rebounds	High assists	Location Attendance	Record
2	November 1, 1986	Boston	W 111–105				MECCA Arena	2–0

December: 0–0 (home: 0–0; road: 0–0)

Game	Date	Team	Score	High points	High rebounds	High assists	Location Attendance	Record

January: 0–0 (home: 0–0; road: 0–0)

Game	Date	Team	Score	High points	High rebounds	High assists	Location Attendance	Record

February: 0–0 (home: 0–0; road: 0–0)

Game	Date	Team	Score	High points	High rebounds	High assists	Location Attendance	Record

March: 0–0 (home: 0–0; road: 0–0)

Game	Date	Team	Score	High points	High rebounds	High assists	Location Attendance	Record

April: 0–0 (home: 0–0; road: 0–0)

Game	Date	Team	Score	High points	High rebounds	High assists	Location Attendance	Record

1986–87 schedule

== Playoffs ==
1987 playoff game log
First Round: 3–2 (home: 2–1; road: 1–1)

Game	Date	Team	Score	High points	High rebounds	High assists	Location Attendance	Series
1	April 24	Philadelphia	W 107–104	Terry Cummings (21)	Jack Sikma (11)	Paul Pressey (10)	MECCA Arena; 11,052	1–0
2	April 26	Philadelphia	L 122–125 (OT)	Ricky Pierce (24)	Randy Breuer (9)	Paul Pressey (9)	MECCA Arena; 11,052	1–1
3	April 29	@ Philadelphia	W 121–120	Terry Cummings (26)	Jack Sikma (12)	John Lucas (9)	Spectrum; 14,361	2–1
4	May 1	@ Philadelphia	L 118–124	Terry Cummings (29)	Jack Sikma (13)	John Lucas (10)	Spectrum; 15,464	2–2
5	May 3	Philadelphia	W 102–89	Jack Sikma (18)	Jack Sikma (21)	Paul Pressey (9)	MECCA Arena; 11,052	3–2

Conference semifinals: 3–4 (home: 2–1; road: 1–3)

Game	Date	Team	Score	High points	High rebounds	High assists	Location Attendance	Series
1	May 5	@ Boston	L 98–111	Terry Cummings (28)	Terry Cummings (12)	Paul Pressey (8)	Boston Garden; 14,890	0–1
2	May 6	@ Boston	L 124–126	Terry Cummings (28)	Jack Sikma (14)	Paul Pressey (6)	Boston Garden; 14,890	0–2
3	May 8	Boston	W 126–121 (OT)	John Lucas (30)	Terry Cummings (12)	Paul Pressey (7)	MECCA Arena; 11,052	1–2
4	May 10	Boston	L 137–138 (2OT)	Terry Cummings (31)	Terry Cummings (11)	Paul Pressey (11)	MECCA Arena; 11,052	1–3
5	May 13	@ Boston	W 129–124	Sidney Moncrief (33)	Sikma, Cummings (9)	Paul Pressey (10)	Boston Garden; 14,890	2–3
6	May 15	Boston	W 121–111	Sidney Moncrief (34)	Terry Cummings (11)	Paul Pressey (11)	MECCA Arena; 11,052	3–3
7	May 17	@ Boston	L 113–119	Paul Pressey (28)	Jack Sikma (10)	Paul Pressey (8)	Boston Garden; 14,890	3–4

1987 schedule

== Player statistics ==
Legend
GP	Games played	GS	Games started	MPG	Minutes per game
FG%	Field-goal percentage	3P%	3-point field-goal percentage	FT%	Free-throw percentage
RPG	Rebounds per game	APG	Assists per game	SPG	Steals per game
BPG	Blocks per game	PPG	Points per game

=== Season ===
Player	GP	GS	MPG	FG%	3FG%	FT%	RPG	APG	SPG	BPG	PPG
Terry Cummings	82	77	33.8	51.1	0.0	66.2	8.5	2.8	1.6	1.0	20.8
Ricky Pierce	79	31	31.7	53.4	10.7	88.0	3.4	1.8	0.8	0.3	19.5
John Lucas	43	40	31.6	45.7	36.5	78.7	2.9	6.7	1.7	0.1	17.5
Paul Pressey	61	60	33.7	47.7	29.1	73.8	4.9	7.2	1.8	0.8	13.9
Jack Sikma	82	82	30.9	46.3	0.0	84.7	10.0	2.5	1.1	1.1	12.7
Sidney Moncrief	39	30	25.4	48.8	25.8	84.0	3.3	3.1	0.7	0.3	11.8
Craig Hodges	78	43	27.5	46.2	37.3	89.1	1.8	3.1	1.0	0.1	10.8
Randy Breuer	76	10	19.3	48.5	0.0	58.4	4.6	0.6	0.7	0.8	7.9
Jerry Reynolds	58	24	16.6	39.3	33.3	64.1	3.0	1.8	0.9	0.5	7.0
Junior Bridgeman	34	4	12.3	46.2	16.7	80.0	1.5	1.0	0.3	0.1	5.1
Don Collins	6	0	9.5	35.7	0.0	71.4	2.5	0.3	0.3	0.2	4.2
Scott Skiles	13	0	15.8	29.0	21.4	83.3	2.0	3.5	0.4	0.1	3.8
Mike Glenn	4	0	8.5	38.5	0.0	71.4	0.5	0.3	0.3	0.0	3.8
Keith Smith	42	4	11.0	38.0	33.3	75.0	0.8	1.0	0.6	0.1	3.3
Kenny Fields	4	0	5.5	75.0	0.0	20.0	0.5	0.3	0.3	0.0	3.3
Dudley Bradley	68	2	13.2	35.7	26.0	81.0	1.5	1.0	1.5	0.1	3.1
Hank McDowell	7	0	10.0	47.1	0.0	85.7	2.7	0.3	0.3	0.0	3.1
Cedric Henderson	2	0	3.0	66.7	0.0	100.0	2.5	0.0	0.0	0.0	3.0
Paul Mokeski	62	3	10.1	40.3	0.0	71.9	2.2	0.4	0.3	0.2	2.4
Jerome Henderson	6	0	6.0	30.8	0.0	100.0	1.2	0.0	0.2	0.2	2.0
Marvin Webster	15	0	6.8	52.6	100.0	75.0	1.7	0.2	0.2	0.5	1.8
Chris Engler	5	0	9.6	25.0	0.0	100.0	3.2	0.6	0.2	0.2	1.4

=== Playoffs ===
Player	GP	GS	MPG	FG%	3FG%	FT%	RPG	APG	SPG	BPG	PPG
Terry Cummings	12	10	36.9	48.8	0.0	68.7	7.9	2.3	1.0	1.1	22.3
Sidney Moncrief	12	10	35.5	47.3	28.6	81.1	4.5	3.0	1.1	0.5	19.4
Jack Sikma	12	12	35.5	48.7	0.0	98.0	10.8	1.9	1.3	0.8	16.2
Ricky Pierce	12	2	26.4	47.9	0.0	82.1	2.3	1.3	0.8	0.4	15.9
John Lucas	12	12	30.2	45.3	33.3	81.3	2.1	5.2	1.2	0.1	15.6
Paul Pressey	12	12	38.8	46.6	12.5	73.9	5.2	8.6	2.3	0.7	14.3
Craig Hodges	12	0	18.8	51.9	29.4	90.9	1.8	1.7	0.8	0.2	7.9
Randy Breuer	12	2	13.0	48.5	0.0	66.7	2.6	0.3	0.6	0.8	3.3
Paul Mokeski	12	0	8.9	36.4	0.0	80.0	2.4	0.2	0.3	0.2	2.3
Dudley Bradley	12	0	3.8	36.4	0.0	50.0	0.0	0.2	0.3	0.0	0.8
Jerry Reynolds	4	0	1.3	33.3	0.0	50.0	0.3	0.5	0.8	0.0	0.8
Jerome Henderson	1	0	1.0	0.0	0.0	0.0	0.0	0.0	0.0	0.0	0.0

== Awards and records ==
- Ricky Pierce, NBA Sixth Man of the Year Award
- Paul Pressey, NBA All-Defensive Second Team

== Transactions ==
=== Trades ===
July 1, 1986
To Milwaukee Bucks----
- Jack Sikma
To Seattle SuperSonics----
- Alton Lister

== See also ==
- 1986-87 NBA season
