= Herb Williams =

American basketball player (born 1958)

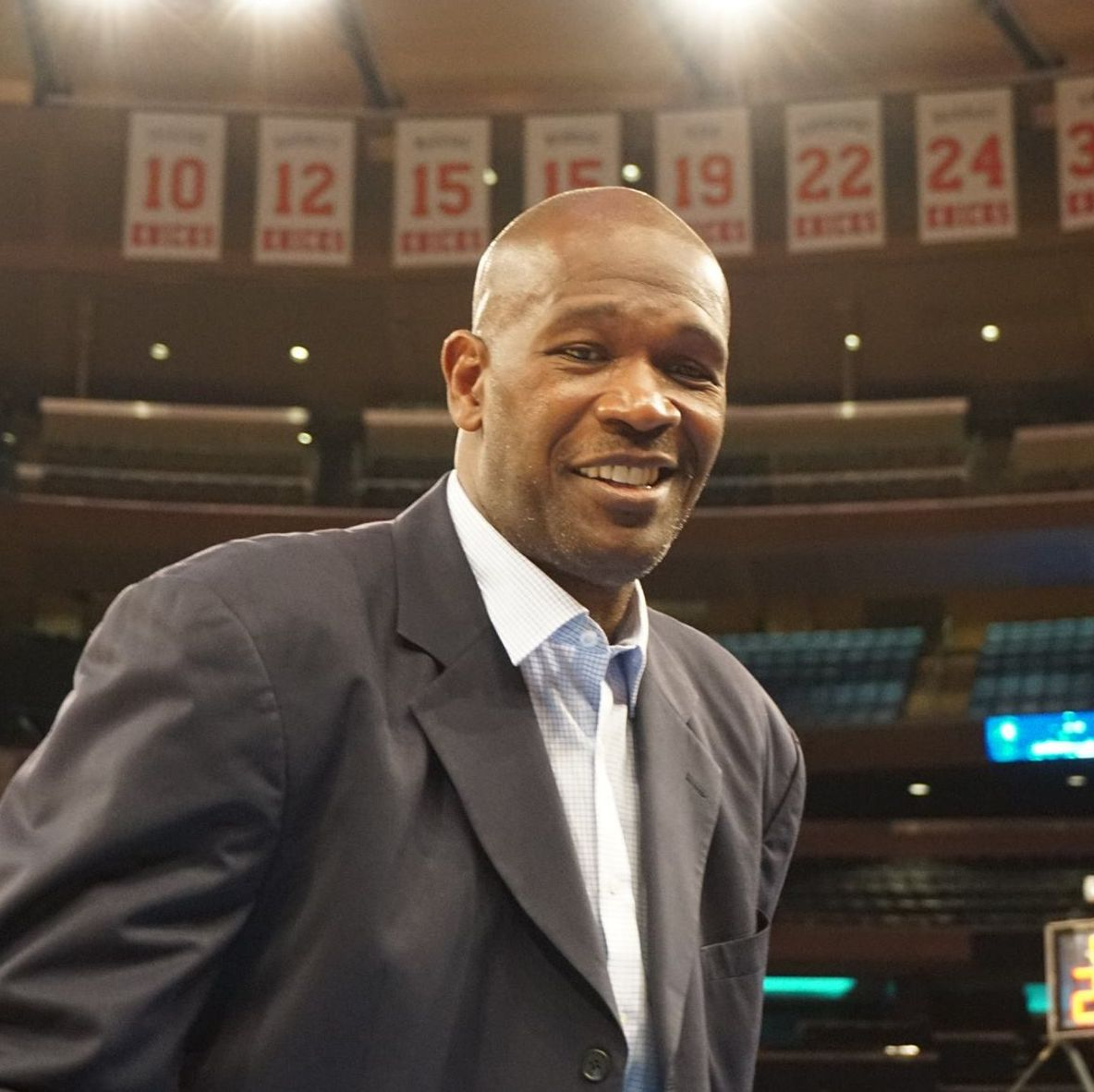
- Williams in 2015

Personal information
- Born: February 16, 1958 (age 68) Columbus, Ohio, U.S.
- Listed height: 6 ft 11 in (2.11 m)
- Listed weight: 260 lb (118 kg)

Career information
- High school: Marion-Franklin (Columbus, Ohio)
- College: Ohio State (1977–1981)
- NBA draft: 1981: 1st round, 14th overall pick
- Drafted by: Indiana Pacers
- Playing career: 1981–1999
- Position: Center / power forward
- Number: 32
- Coaching career: 2003–2019

Career history

Playing
- 1981–1989: Indiana Pacers
- 1989–1992: Dallas Mavericks
- 1992–1996: New York Knicks
- 1996: Toronto Raptors
- 1996–1999: New York Knicks

Career highlights
- Third-team All-American – AP (1980); First-team All-Big Ten (1980); First-team Parade All-American (1977)

Career NBA statistics
- Points: 11,944 (10.8 ppg)
- Rebounds: 6,509 (5.9 rpg)
- Blocks: 1,605 (1.5 bpg)
- Stats at NBA.com
- Stats at Basketball Reference

Herbert Levene Williams (born February 16, 1958) is an American former professional basketball player in the National Basketball Association (NBA) for eighteen seasons from 1981 to 1999. Williams served as the interim head coach and the assistant coach of the NBA's New York Knicks. He was last an assistant coach for the New York Liberty of the WNBA.

== College career ==
Williams was a four-year starter for the Ohio State Buckeyes, scoring 2,011 points (then a team record) and pulling down 1,111 rebounds (still second in team history only to Jerry Lucas). Williams is the school leader in career field goals made, with 834 in 114 games. He is second all-time in career blocked shots with 328.

Williams was named to the All-Big Ten team as a junior, when Ohio State finished the year with a 21–8 record and advanced to the NCAA regionals. He led the Buckeyes in scoring that year with an average of 17.6 points per game.

Williams was a team co-captain in both his junior and senior years.

== Professional career ==
Williams was a first-round draft choice of the Indiana Pacers in 1981, where he played from 1982 to 1989 and had his most productive years.

A consistent and productive center, Williams averaged double figures in all seven of his full seasons as a Pacer, including a career-best 19.9 points per game during the 1985–1986 season. He remains among the Pacers' top ten career leaders in rebounds (4,494), blocks (1,094), and games played (577).

Williams was traded to the Dallas Mavericks midway through the 1988–1989 season on February 22 in exchange for forward Detlef Schrempf.

In 1992, he was signed by the New York Knicks, where he spent seven years backing up perennial All-Star Patrick Ewing. Williams played one game (31 minutes) for the Toronto Raptors in 1996 before being waived and quickly returned to the Knicks. The team made the 1994 and 1999 NBA Finals, with Williams serving as a team leader. Although he played sparingly, he was only Knicks players to appear in both series (Ewing was injured for the '99).

After the 1999 Finals, Williams retired at the age of forty-one after six regular season games and eight playoff games in 1999. Four years later, he returned to the Knicks as an assistant coach. He worked under head coaches Don Chaney and Lenny Wilkens. When Wilkens resigned in 2005, Williams took over as head coach.

On July 26, 2005, Larry Brown was hired as the head coach of the Knicks, thus ending Williams's head coaching tenure. Williams was the acting head coach of the Knicks for the final two games of the 2005–2006 season, when illness kept Larry Brown away from the bench for the final two games of his Knicks career.

After that season, Brown was fired by the Knicks and replaced as head coach by Isiah Thomas. Williams worked as an assistant coach under Thomas and Mike D'Antoni, and continued to be in the coaching staff under Mike Woodson until Phil Jackson fired the entire staff in 2014. He has coached for the Knicks' NBA Summer League team.

On March 26, 2015, Williams was hired as the assistant coach of the WNBA's New York Liberty.

== Career playing statistics ==
Legend
GP	Games played	GS	Games started	MPG	Minutes per game
FG%	Field goal percentage	3P%	3-point field goal percentage	FT%	Free throw percentage
RPG	Rebounds per game	APG	Assists per game	SPG	Steals per game
BPG	Blocks per game	PPG	Points per game	**Bold**	Career high

=== NBA ===
==== Regular season ====
Year	Team	GP	GS	MPG	FG%	3P%	FT%	RPG	APG	SPG	BPG	PPG
1981–82	Indiana	**82**	**75**	27.8	.477	**.286**	.670	7.4	1.7	.6	2.2	11.5
1982–83	Indiana	78	74	32.2	.499	.000	.705	7.5	**3.4**	.7	2.2	16.9
1983–84	Indiana	69	53	33.0	.478	.000	.702	8.0	3.1	.9	1.6	14.9
1984–85	Indiana	75	70	34.1	.475	.111	.657	8.5	**3.4**	.7	1.8	18.3
1985–86	Indiana	78	74	**35.5**	.492	.083	.730	**9.1**	2.2	.6	**2.4**	**19.9**
1986–87	Indiana	74	67	34.1	.480	.000	.740	7.3	2.4	.8	1.3	14.9
1987–88	Indiana	75	37	26.2	.425	.000	.737	6.3	1.3	.5	1.9	10.0
1988–89	Indiana	46	46	34.1	.450	.000	.714	8.6	1.9	.7	1.7	12.6
1988–89	Dallas	30	20	30.1	.396	.000	.632	6.6	1.2	.5	1.8	6.6
1989–90	Dallas	81	19	27.1	.444	.222	.679	4.8	1.5	.6	1.3	8.6
1990–91	Dallas	60	36	30.5	**.507**	.000	.638	6.0	1.6	.5	1.5	12.5
1991–92	Dallas	75	26	27.2	.431	.167	.725	6.1	1.3	.5	1.3	11.5
1992–93	New York	55	0	10.4	.411	–	.667	2.7	.3	.4	.5	2.9
1993–94	New York	70	3	11.1	.442	.000	.643	2.6	.4	.3	.6	3.3
1994–95	New York	56	3	13.3	.456	–	.622	2.4	.5	.2	.8	3.3
1995–96	Toronto	1	0	31.0	.375	–	–	8.0	.0	**1.0**	2.0	6.0
1995–96	New York	43	2	12.6	.410	.250	.650	1.9	.6	.3	.7	3.1
1996–97	New York	21	2	8.8	.391	.000	.750	1.5	.2	.2	.2	1.9
1997–98	New York	27	0	6.6	.419	–	.125	1.1	.1	.2	.3	1.4
1998–99	New York	6	0	5.7	.500	–	**1.000**	1.0	.0	.0	.3	1.7
Career		1,102	607	25.8	.467	.095	.696	5.9	1.7	.5	1.5	10.8

==== Playoffs ====
Year	Team	GP	GS	MPG	FG%	3P%	FT%	RPG	APG	SPG	BPG	PPG
1987	Indiana	4	**4**	**33.5**	.588	–	.538	**5.0**	**1.8**	.0	.3	11.8
1990	Dallas	3	0	27.0	**.609**	–	.813	4.3	1.7	.3	**.7**	**13.7**
1993	New York	7	0	9.9	.357	–	**1.000**	2.0	.3	.1	.6	2.0
1994	New York	**19**	0	6.7	.419	–	.667	1.1	.2	.2	.6	1.5
1995	New York	8	0	6.9	.231	–	**1.000**	.9	.0	**.6**	.6	1.0
1996	New York	5	0	6.6	.600	–	.750	.0	.0	.0	.4	1.8
1997	New York	3	0	7.7	.400	–	–	.3	.0	.0	.0	1.3
1999	New York	8	0	2.0	.200	–	–	.4	.0	.0	.0	.3
Career		57	4	9.4	.469	–	.738	1.4	.3	.2	.4	2.7

== Head coaching record ==
Legend
Regular season	G	Games coached	W	Games won	L	Games lost	W–L %	Win–loss %
Playoffs	PG	Playoff games	PW	Playoff wins	PL	Playoff losses	PW–L %	Playoff win–loss %

Team	Year	G	W	L	W–L%	Finish	PG	PW	PL	PW–L%	Result
New York	2003–04	1	1	0	1.000	(interim)	—	—	—	—	—
New York	2004–05	43	16	27	.372	5th in Atlantic	—	—	—	—	Missed playoffs
Career		44	17	27	.386		—	—	—	—	—

== See also ==
- List of National Basketball Association career blocks leaders
- List of NCAA Division I men's basketball players with 2000 points and 1000 rebounds
