= Vern Fleming =

American basketball player (born 1962)

Personal information
- Born: February 4, 1962 (age 64) New York City, New York, U.S.
- Listed height: 6 ft 5 in (1.96 m)
- Listed weight: 185 lb (84 kg)

Career information
- High school: Mater Christi (Astoria, New York)
- College: Georgia (1980–1984)
- NBA draft: 1984: 1st round, 18th overall pick
- Drafted by: Indiana Pacers
- Playing career: 1984–1997
- Position: Point guard
- Number: 10

Career history
- 1984–1995: Indiana Pacers
- 1995–1996: New Jersey Nets
- 1996–1997: Limoges

Career highlights
- Third-team All-American – NABC (1984); First-team All-SEC (1984); First-team Parade All-American (1980); McDonald's All-American (1980)

Career NBA statistics
- Points: 10,125 (11.3 ppg)
- Rebounds: 3,012 (3.4 rpg)
- Assists: 4,293 (4.8 apg)
- Stats at NBA.com
- Stats at Basketball Reference
Medals
Men's basketball
Representing United States
Olympic Games
Gold medal – first place	1984 Los Angeles	Team competition

Vern Fleming (born February 4, 1962) is an American former professional basketball player who played twelve seasons in the NBA from 1984 until 1996 for the Indiana Pacers and New Jersey Nets. He played college basketball for the Georgia Bulldogs.

== Early life ==
Vern Fleming was born in New York City, New York. He attended high school at Mater Christi in Astoria, New York, where he was a star basketball player.

== College and Olympics ==
As a college player at the University of Georgia, Fleming won a gold medal as a member of the United States men's basketball team at the 1984 Summer Olympics in Los Angeles, California and then commenced his professional career as the 18th overall selection in the 1984 NBA draft by the Indiana Pacers.

== Professional athlete ==
Fleming played point guard with the Pacers for eleven years, often sharing starter duties with both Haywoode Workman and Mark Jackson. Perhaps his best season as a pro came in 1990, when he started all 82 games of the season while averaging career bests of 14.3 points per game and 7.4 assists per game. The following season, on November 23, 1990, Fleming recorded a career high 18 assists, along with scoring 14 points, in a 112–111 win over the Houston Rockets. On April 2, 1994, while playing against the Orlando Magic, Fleming lost several teeth and suffered several lacerations inside his mouth after a collision with Shaquille O'Neal. Fleming spent his final year in the NBA playing for the New Jersey Nets. He retired in 1997.

== Career statistics ==
Legend
GP	Games played	GS	Games started	MPG	Minutes per game
FG%	Field goal percentage	3P%	3-point field goal percentage	FT%	Free throw percentage
RPG	Rebounds per game	APG	Assists per game	SPG	Steals per game
BPG	Blocks per game	PPG	Points per game	**Bold**	Career high
*	Led the league

=== NBA ===
==== Regular season ====
Year	Team	GP	GS	MPG	FG%	3P%	FT%	RPG	APG	SPG	BPG	PPG
1984–85	Indiana	80	65	31.1	.470	.000	.767	4.0	3.1	1.2	.1	14.1
1985–86	Indiana	80	77	**35.9**	.506	.167	.745	**4.8**	6.3	**1.6**	.1	14.2
1986–87	Indiana	**82***	**82***	31.1	.509	.200	.788	4.1	5.8	1.3	**.2**	12.0
1987–88	Indiana	80	80	34.2	.523	.000	**.802**	4.6	7.1	1.4	.1	13.9
1988–89	Indiana	76	69	33.6	.515	.130	.799	4.1	6.5	1.0	**.2**	**14.3**
1989–90	Indiana	**82***	**82***	35.1	.508	**.353**	.782	3.9	**7.4**	1.1	.1	**14.3**
1990–91	Indiana	69	45	28.0	**.531**	.222	.729	3.1	5.3	1.1	**.2**	12.7
1991–92	Indiana	**82**	6	21.2	.482	.222	.737	2.5	3.2	.7	.1	8.9
1992–93	Indiana	75	8	20.0	.505	.194	.726	2.3	3.0	.8	.1	9.5
1993–94	Indiana	55	5	19.1	.462	.000	.736	2.2	3.1	.7	.1	6.5
1994–95	Indiana	55	1	12.5	.495	.000	.722	1.6	2.0	.5	.0	4.6
1995–96	New Jersey	77	3	22.7	.433	.107	.751	2.2	3.3	.5	.1	7.7
Career		893	523	27.7	.498	.181	.764	3.4	4.8	1.0	.1	11.3

==== Playoffs ====
Year	Team	GP	GS	MPG	FG%	3P%	FT%	RPG	APG	SPG	BPG	PPG
1987	Indiana	4	**4**	35.3	.361	.000	.767	**6.5**	**6.0**	**1.0**	.3	**12.3**
1990	Indiana	3	3	**37.7**	.471	.000	.889	4.3	**6.0**	.7	.3	**13.3**
1991	Indiana	5	0	23.0	.450	.000	.786	3.4	4.6	.2	**.6**	9.4
1992	Indiana	3	0	17.0	**.556**	–	.333	.7	2.0	**1.0**	.0	7.0
1993	Indiana	3	3	26.7	.444	**.500**	**1.000**	1.7	1.0	.7	.3	10.0
1994	Indiana	**16**	1	15.4	.513	.000	.850	1.3	2.4	.6	.1	5.9
1995	Indiana	3	0	2.7	.333	.000	.000	.7	.7	.0	.0	.7
Career		37	11	20.4	.466	.143	.771	2.3	3.1	.6	.2	7.7
