= Clifford Robinson =

Clifford Robinson is the name of:

- Clifford Robinson (basketball, born 1966) (1966–2020), American basketball player in the NBA from 1989 to 2007
- Cliff Robinson (basketball, born 1960), American basketball player in the NBA from 1979 to 1991
- Clifford William Robinson (1866–1944), Canadian politician
- Cliff Robinson (artist), British comic book artist
- Cliff Robinson, former chairman of West Sussex County Council, 1993-97
