= 1986–87 Sacramento Kings season =

NBA professional basketball team season

- Head coach: Phil Johnson; Jerry Reynolds
- Owners: Joseph Benvenuti; Gregg Lukenbill
- Arena: ARCO Arena I

Results
- Record: 29–53 (.354)
- Place: Division: 5th (Midwest); Conference: 10th (Western)
- Playoff finish: Did not qualify
- Stats at Basketball Reference

Local media
- Television: KOVR
- Radio: KFBK

The 1986-87 Sacramento Kings season was the Kings' 38th season in the NBA and second in Sacramento.

== Draft picks ==
Round	Pick	Player	Position	Nationality	College
1	17	Harold Pressley	SF	United States	Villanova
2	34	Johnny Rogers	PF	United States	UC-Irvine
3	57	Bruce Douglas	G	United States	Illinois
4	80	Alvin Franklin		United States	Houston
4	91	Bob Beecher		United States	Virginia Polytechnic
5	103	Keith Morrison		United States	Washington State
6	126	John Flowers		United States	Nevada-Las Vegas
7	149	Ron Rankin		United States	Southeast Missouri State

== Roster ==
1986–87 Sacramento Kings roster
Players

Pos.	No.	Player	Height	Weight	DOB	From
G	22	Franklin Edwards	6 ft 1 in (1.85 m)	170 lb (77 kg)		Cleveland State
G/F	8	Eddie Johnson	6 ft 7 in (2.01 m)	215 lb (98 kg)		Illinois
C	35	Joe Kleine	6 ft 11 in (2.11 m)	255 lb (116 kg)		Arkansas
F	53	Mark Olberding	6 ft 8 in (2.03 m)	225 lb (102 kg)		Minnesota
F	21	Harold Pressley	6 ft 7 in (2.01 m)	210 lb (95 kg)		Villanova
F	32	Johnny Rogers	6 ft 10 in (2.08 m)	225 lb (102 kg)		UC Irvine
G/F	18	Derek Smith	6 ft 6 in (1.98 m)	205 lb (93 kg)		Louisville
G	24	Reggie Theus	6 ft 7 in (2.01 m)	190 lb (86 kg)		UNLV
C	41	LaSalle Thompson	6 ft 10 in (2.08 m)	245 lb (111 kg)		Texas
F/C	33	Otis Thorpe	6 ft 9 in (2.06 m)	225 lb (102 kg)		Providence
F	40	Terry Tyler	6 ft 7 in (2.01 m)	215 lb (98 kg)		Detroit Mercy
G	2	Othell Wilson	6 ft 0 in (1.83 m)	190 lb (86 kg)		Virginia

Coaches
Head coach
- Jerry Reynolds
Assistant(s)
- Don Buse
- Frank Hamblen

Legend
- (DP) Unsigned draft pick
- (FA) Free agent
- (S) Suspended
- Injured

== Regular season ==
=== Season standings ===
Midwest Division	W	L	PCT	GB	Home	Road	Div
y-Dallas Mavericks	55	27	.671	–	35–6	20–21	19–11
x-Utah Jazz	44	38	.537	11	31–10	13–28	19–11
x-Houston Rockets	42	40	.512	13	25–16	17–24	19–11
x-Denver Nuggets	37	45	.451	18	27–14	10–31	14–16
Sacramento Kings	29	53	.354	26	20–21	9–32	10–20
San Antonio Spurs	28	54	.341	27	21–20	7–34	9–21

#	Western Conference				
#	Team	W	L	PCT	GB
1	z-Los Angeles Lakers	65	17	.793	–
2	y-Dallas Mavericks	55	27	.671	10
3	x-Portland Trail Blazers	49	33	.598	16
4	x-Utah Jazz	44	38	.537	21
5	x-Golden State Warriors	42	40	.512	23
6	x-Houston Rockets	42	40	.512	23
7	x-Seattle SuperSonics	39	43	.476	26
8	x-Denver Nuggets	37	45	.451	28
9	Phoenix Suns	36	46	.439	29
10	Sacramento Kings	29	53	.354	36
11	San Antonio Spurs	28	54	.341	37
12	Los Angeles Clippers	12	70	.146	53

z - clinched division title
y - clinched division title
x - clinched playoff spot

== Player statistics ==
Legend
GP	Games played	GS	Games started	MPG	Minutes per game
FG%	Field-goal percentage	3P%	3-point field-goal percentage	FT%	Free-throw percentage
RPG	Rebounds per game	APG	Assists per game	SPG	Steals per game
BPG	Blocks per game	PPG	Points per game

Player	GP	GS	MPG	FG%	3FG%	FT%	RPG	APG	SPG	BPG	PPG

== See also ==
- 1986-87 NBA season
