= 1986–87 Seattle SuperSonics season =

NBA professional basketball team season

- Head coach: Bernie Bickerstaff
- General manager: Bob Whitsitt
- Owner: Barry Ackerley
- Arena: Seattle Center Coliseum

Results
- Record: 39–43 (.476)
- Place: Division: 4th (Pacific); Conference: 7th (Western)
- Playoff finish: Western Conference finals (lost to Lakers 0–4)
- Stats at Basketball Reference

Local media
- Television: KIRO-TV
- Radio: KING

The 1986–87 Seattle SuperSonics season was the 20th season of the Seattle SuperSonics in the National Basketball Association. Bernie Bickerstaff returned for his second season as head coach of the franchise and, despite a modest improvement over their previous season's 31–51 record, managed to clinch a spot in the playoffs, where they defeated the Dallas Mavericks in four games in the First Round, and then the Houston Rockets in six games in the Semi-finals, reaching the Western Conference Finals, only to be swept in four games to the eventual NBA champion Los Angeles Lakers. The 39-43 Sonics remain the last team to date in the NBA to win a playoff series with a losing regular season record.

It is also their first year without team captain Jack Sikma as he was traded in the offseason.

== Offseason ==
=== Draft ===
Round	Pick	Player	Position	Nationality	College
2	30	Nate McMillan	PG/SG	United States	NC State
2	38	Lemone Lampley	C	United States	DePaul
3	53	Tod Murphy	PF/C	United States	UC Irvine
4	76	Michael Graham	F	United States	Georgetown
5	99	Dominic Pressley	PG	United States	Boston College
6	122	Curtis Kitchen	PF	United States	South Florida
7	145	Glen McCants	F	United States	Clemson

== Roster ==
1986–87 Seattle SuperSonics roster
Players

Pos.	No.	Player	Height	Weight	DOB	From
PF	24	Tom Chambers	6 ft 10 in (2.08 m)	220 lb (100 kg)	1959–06–21	Utah
G/F	3	Dale Ellis	6 ft 7 in (2.01 m)	205 lb (93 kg)	1960–08–06	Tennessee
C	45	Clemon Johnson	6 ft 10 in (2.08 m)	240 lb (109 kg)	1956–09–12	Florida A&M
G	15	Eddie Johnson	6 ft 2 in (1.88 m)	180 lb (82 kg)	1955–02–24	Auburn
PF	42	Curtis Kitchen	6 ft 9 in (2.06 m)	235 lb (107 kg)	1964–01–30	South Florida
C	53	Alton Lister	7 ft 0 in (2.13 m)	240 lb (109 kg)	1958–10–01	Arizona State
PF/C	20	Maurice Lucas	6 ft 9 in (2.06 m)	215 lb (98 kg)	1952–02–18	Marquette
F	34	Xavier McDaniel	6 ft 7 in (2.01 m)	205 lb (93 kg)	1963–06–04	Wichita State
G	10	Nate McMillan	6 ft 5 in (1.96 m)	195 lb (88 kg)	1964–08–03	NC State
G	25	Mike Phelps	6 ft 4 in (1.93 m)	180 lb (82 kg)	1961–10–03	Alcorn State
PF/C	40	Russ Schoene	6 ft 10 in (2.08 m)	210 lb (95 kg)	1960–04–16	Chattanooga
G	44	Terence Stansbury	6 ft 5 in (1.96 m)	170 lb (77 kg)	1961–02–27	Temple
G	30	Kevin Williams	6 ft 2 in (1.88 m)	175 lb (79 kg)	1961–09–11	St. John's
PG	22	Danny Young	6 ft 3 in (1.91 m)	175 lb (79 kg)	1962–07–26	Wake Forest

Coaches
Head coach
- (United States) Bernie Bickerstaff
  (San Diego)

Legend
- (DP) Unsigned draft pick
- (FA) Free agent
- (S) Suspended
- Injured

== Season standings ==
=== Division ===
Pacific Division	W	L	PCT	GB	Home	Road	Div
y-Los Angeles Lakers	65	17	.793	–	37–4	28–13	24–6
x-Portland Trail Blazers	49	33	.598	16	34–7	15–26	17–13
x-Golden State Warriors	42	40	.512	23	25–16	17–24	17–13
x-Seattle SuperSonics	39	43	.476	26	25–16	14–27	15–15
Phoenix Suns	36	46	.439	29	26–15	10–31	14–16
Los Angeles Clippers	12	70	.146	53	9–32	3–38	3–27

=== Conference ===
#	Western Conference				
#	Team	W	L	PCT	GB
1	z-Los Angeles Lakers	65	17	.793	–
2	y-Dallas Mavericks	55	27	.671	10
3	x-Portland Trail Blazers	49	33	.598	16
4	x-Utah Jazz	44	38	.537	21
5	x-Golden State Warriors	42	40	.512	23
6	x-Houston Rockets	42	40	.512	23
7	x-Seattle SuperSonics	39	43	.476	26
8	x-Denver Nuggets	37	45	.451	28
9	Phoenix Suns	36	46	.439	29
10	Sacramento Kings	29	53	.354	36
11	San Antonio Spurs	28	54	.341	37
12	Los Angeles Clippers	12	70	.146	53

== Game log ==
1986–87 game log
October

Game	Date	Team	Score	High points	Location Attendance	Record
1	October 31	@ Portland	W 127–110	Tom Chambers (27)	Memorial Coliseum; 12,666	1–0

November

Game	Date	Team	Score	High points	Location Attendance	Record
2	November 1	Sacramento	W 114–103	Xavier McDaniel (27)	Seattle Center Coliseum; 6,296	2–0
3	November 4	L. A. Lakers	L 96–110	Tom Chambers (21)	Seattle Center Coliseum; 10,426	2–1
4	November 6	Dallas	L 124–147	Xavier McDaniel (28)	Seattle Center Coliseum; 8,363	2–2
5	November 8	New York	W 105–102	Dale Ellis (29)	Seattle Center Coliseum; 9,280	3–2
6	November 11	Philadelphia	L 114–121	Tom Chambers (33)	Seattle Center Coliseum; 12,600	3–3
7	November 12	@ L. A. Lakers	L 97–122	Xavier McDaniel (17)	The Forum; 13,694	3–4
8	November 15	@ Golden State	W 127–121	Tom Chambers (38)	Oakland-Alameda County Coliseum Arena; 7,655	4–4
9	November 18	Sacramento	W 119–105	Dale Ellis (28)	Seattle Center Coliseum; 5,411	5–4
10	November 20	Milwaukee	L 105–116	Tom Chambers (35)	Seattle Center Coliseum; 8,790	5–5
11	November 22	Indiana	W 121–111	Tom Chambers (35)	Seattle Center Coliseum; 6,399	6–5
12	November 25	Los Angeles Clippers	W 113–103	Dale Ellis (35)	Seattle Center Coliseum; 4,702	7–5
13	November 26	@ Utah	L 91–127	Tom Chambers (22)	Salt Palace; 10,512	7–6
14	November 28	@ Phoenix	W 117–104	Dale Ellis (34)	Arizona Veterans Memorial Coliseum; 10,462	8–6

December

Game	Date	Team	Score	High points	Location Attendance	Record
15	December 2	Chicago	L 109–115 (OT)	Xavier McDaniel; Tom Chambers (29)	Seattle Center Coliseum; 13,438	8–7
16	December 4	@ San Antonio	W 109–102	Tom Chambers (36)	HemisFair Arena; 5,893	9–7
17	December 6	@ Houston	W 136–80	Tom Chambers (29)	The Summit; 16,016	10–7
18	December 10	@ L. A. Clippers	L 94–101	Tom Chambers (28)	Los Angeles Memorial Sports Arena; 5,573	10–8
19	December 11	San Antonio	W 113–107	Xavier McDaniel (33)	Seattle Center Coliseum; 5,056	11–8
20	December 13	Dallas	L 109–126	Tom Chambers; Dale Ellis (24)	Seattle Center Coliseum; 9,789	11–9
21	December 16	@ Portland	L 118–126	Dale Ellis (34)	Memorial Coliseum; 12,666	11–10
22	December 18	Houston	W 114–100	Dale Ellis (33)	Seattle Center Coliseum; 7,696	12–10
23	December 19	@ Phoenix	W 108–106	Dale Ellis (28)	Arizona Veterans Memorial Coliseum; 10,433	13–10
24	December 21	Golden State	L 112–121	Tom Chambers (25)	Seattle Center Coliseum; 5,228	13–11
25	December 23	Denver	W 127–116	Tom Chambers (35)	Seattle Center Coliseum; 7,459	14–11
26	December 26	L. A. Clippers	W 113–107	Tom Chambers (27)	Seattle Center Coliseum; 6,353	15–11
27	December 28	Portland	L 118–127	Xavier McDaniel (30)	Seattle Center Coliseum; 9,365	15–12
28	December 30	Boston	L 102–104	Xavier McDaniel (25)	Seattle Center Coliseum; 14,600	15–13

January

Game	Date	Team	Score	High points	Location Attendance	Record
29	January 2	@ Dallas	L 107–117	Dale Ellis (28)	Reunion Arena; 17,007	15–14
30	January 3	@ Houston	L 114–138	Xavier McDaniel; Dale Ellis (21)	The Summit; 16,016	15–15
31	January 6	Phoenix	W 138–108	Tom Chambers (29)	Seattle Center Coliseum; 5,764	16–15
32	January 8	@ Golden State	W 115–108	Dale Ellis (35)	Oakland-Alameda County Coliseum Arena; 7,790	17–15
33	January 11	Utah Jazz	W 127–111	Tom Chambers (31)	Seattle Center Coliseum; 7,594	18–15
34	January 13	@ Denver	L 109–117	Tom Chambers (30)	McNichols Sports Arena; 8,981	18–16
35	January 14	San Antonio	W 130–104	Dale Ellis (32)	Seattle Center Coliseum; 5,068	19–16
36	January 16	Denver	W 134–100	Xavier McDaniel (30)	Seattle Center Coliseum; 8,544	20–16
37	January 17	@ Sacramento	L 115–125	Xavier McDaniel (37)	ARCO Arena (I); 10,333	20–17
38	January 21	@ Philadelphia	L 123–129 (OT)	Dale Ellis (40)	The Spectrum; 11,891	20–18
39	January 23	@ New Jersey	W 125–120	Xavier McDaniel (32)	Brendan Byrne Arena; 9,182	21–18
40	January 24	@ Atlanta	L 87–97	Dale Ellis (27)	Omni Coliseum; 13,842	21–19
41	January 26	@ Utah	W 108–95	Dale Ellis (34)	Salt Palace; 12,212	22–19
42	January 28	L. A. Lakers	W 125–101	Tom Chambers (37)	Seattle Center Coliseum; 14,634	23–19
43	January 30	@ Golden State	L 119–127	Tom Chambers (36)	Oakland-Alameda County Coliseum Arena; 9,276	23–20
44	January 31	Phoenix	W 118–112 (OT)	Dale Ellis (24)	Seattle Center Coliseum; 9,344	24–20

February

Game	Date	Team	Score	High points	Location Attendance	Record
45	February 2	New Jersey	W 108–100	Xavier McDaniel (35)	Seattle Center Coliseum; 6,132	25–20
46	February 4	@ Dallas	L 94–124	Tom Chambers (19)	Reunion Arena; 17,007	25–21
47	February 5	@ San Antonio	L 111–117	Xavier McDaniel (26)	HemisFair Arena; 7,548	25–22
48	February 10	Atlanta	L 113–125	Tom Chambers (35)	Seattle Center Coliseum; 12,004	25–23
49	February 12	@ Milwaukee	L 104–106	Tom Chambers (32)	MECCA Arena; 11,052	25–24
50	February 13	@ Chicago	L 98–106	Xavier McDaniel (27)	Chicago Stadium; 16,251	25–25
51	February 16	@ Cleveland	L 94–105	Dale Ellis (17)	Coliseum at Richfield; 12,163	25–26
52	February 18	@ Indiana	L 88–105	Dale Ellis (24)	Market Square Arena; 9,077	25–27
53	February 19	@ Detroit	L 105–117	Dale Ellis (31)	Pontiac Silverdome; 14,482	25–28
54	February 21	Washington	W 110–93	Tom Chambers (31)	Seattle Center Coliseum; 11,637	26–28
55	February 23	L. A. Clippers	W 124–112	Dale Ellis (29)	Seattle Center Coliseum; 5,528	27–28
56	February 24	@ Utah	L 103–133	Dale Ellis (26)	Salt Palace; 12,212	27–29
57	February 26	Denver	W 106–100	Xavier McDaniel (30)	Seattle Center Coliseum; 7,691	28–29
58	February 28	@ Phoenix	W 112–105	Dale Ellis (40)	Arizona Veterans Memorial Coliseum; 13,338	29–29

March

Game	Date	Team	Score	High points	Location Attendance	Record
59	March 2	Cleveland	W 123–107	Tom Chambers (36)	Seattle Center Coliseum; 6,488	30–29
60	March 4	@ L. A. Lakers	L 124–138	Dale Ellis (32)	The Forum; 17,505	30–30
61	March 5	Portland	W 127–122	Dale Ellis (38)	Seattle Center Coliseum; 10,205	31–30
62	March 7	Houston	W 118–115	Tom Chambers (29)	Seattle Center Coliseum; 14,474	32–30
63	March 10	@ Houston	W 136–127 (2OT)	Tom Chambers (42)	The Summit; 16,279	33–30
64	March 11	@ Dallas	L 117–130	Tom Chambers; Dale Ellis; Xavier McDaniel (21)	Reunion Arena; 17,007	33–31
65	March 13	@ L. A. Clippers	L 104–108	Tom Chambers (31)	Los Angeles Memorial Sports Arena; 6,522	33–32
66	March 15	@ Sacramento	L 106–107	Dale Ellis (40)	ARCO Arena (I); 10,333	33–33
67	March 16	San Antonio	W 122–111	Dale Ellis (33)	Seattle Center Coliseum; 5,934	34–33
68	March 19	@ Washington	L 106–110	Xavier McDaniel (20)	Capital Centre; 5,987	34–34
69	March 20	@ Boston	L 108–112	Dale Ellis (31)	Boston Garden; 14,890	34–35
70	March 23	@ New York	W 126–121 (OT)	Xavier McDaniel (40)	Madison Square Garden (IV); 9,038	35–35
71	March 26	@ Denver	L 113–123	Xavier McDaniel (33)	McNichols Sports Arena; 10,183	35–36
72	March 27	Golden State	L 105–106	Xavier McDaniel (31)	Seattle Center Coliseum; 9,091	35–37
73	March 29	Detroit	L 107–108	Xavier McDaniel (27)	Seattle Center Coliseum; 8,717	35–38
74	March 31	Sacramento	W 132–129	Tom Chambers (36)	Seattle Center Coliseum; 6,095	36–38

April

Game	Date	Team	Score	High points	Location Attendance	Record
75	April 2	L. A. Lakers	L 114–117	Xavier McDaniel (35)	Seattle Center Coliseum; 14,739	36–39
76	April 4	Portland	L 123–126	Tom Chambers (34)	Seattle Center Coliseum; 12,227	36–40
77	April 7	Phoenix	L 125–127 (OT)	Dale Ellis (35)	Seattle Center Coliseum; 6,585	36–41
78	April 10	@ Portland	L 115–121	Tom Chambers (27)	Memorial Coliseum; 12,666	36–42
79	April 14	Utah	W 103–102	Tom Chambers (30)	Seattle Center Coliseum; 7,178	37–42
80	April 16	@ L. A. Clippers	W 118–87	Dale Ellis (41)	Los Angeles Memorial Sports Arena; 6,517	38–42
81	April 18	Golden State	L 127–132	Tom Chambers (31)	Seattle Center Coliseum; 9,428	38–43
82	April 19	@ L. A. Lakers	W 110–104	Xavier McDaniel (39)	The Forum; 17,505	39–43

1986–87 season schedule

- Green background indicates win.
- Red background indicates loss.

== Playoffs ==
1987 playoff game log
First round: 3–1 (home: 2–0; road: 1–1)

Game	Date	Team	Score	High points	High rebounds	High assists	Location Attendance	Series
1	April 23	@ Dallas	L 129–151	Tom Chambers (35)	Xavier McDaniel (13)	Xavier McDaniel (7)	Reunion Arena; 17,007	0–1
2	April 25	@ Dallas	W 112–110	Dale Ellis (32)	Xavier McDaniel (9)	Nate McMillan (8)	Reunion Arena; 17,007	1–1
3	April 28	Dallas	W 117–107	Dale Ellis (43)	Dale Ellis (14)	Nate McMillan (9)	Hec Edmundson Pavilion; 8,150	2–1
4	April 30	Dallas	W 124–98	Tom Chambers (31)	Chambers, Ellis (9)	Nate McMillan (9)	Hec Edmundson Pavilion; 8,150	3–1

Conference Semi-finals: 4–2 (home: 2–1; road: 2–1)

Game	Date	Team	Score	High points	High rebounds	High assists	Location Attendance	Series
1	May 2	@ Houston	W 111–106 (OT)	Dale Ellis (34)	Tom Chambers (9)	Nate McMillan (8)	The Summit; 16,279	1–0
2	May 5	@ Houston	W 99–97	Dale Ellis (30)	Dale Ellis (9)	Eddie Johnson (8)	The Summit; 16,279	2–0
3	May 7	Houston	L 84–102	Tom Chambers (24)	Dale Ellis (10)	McMillan, Young (4)	Seattle Center Coliseum; 14,587	2–1
4	May 9	Houston	W 117–102	Tom Chambers (38)	Alton Lister (17)	Nate McMillan (10)	Seattle Center Coliseum; 14,559	3–1
5	May 12	@ Houston	L 107–112	Dale Ellis (27)	Tom Chambers (9)	Eddie Johnson (6)	The Summit; 16,279	3–2
6	May 14	Houston	W 128–125 (2OT)	Tom Chambers (37)	Xavier McDaniel (12)	Nate McMillan (16)	Seattle Center Coliseum; 14,751	4–2

Conference finals: 0–4 (home: 0–2; road: 0–2)

Game	Date	Team	Score	High points	High rebounds	High assists	Location Attendance	Series
1	May 16	@ L.A. Lakers	L 82–87	Tom Chambers (28)	McDaniel, Lister (10)	Nate McMillan (8)	The Forum; 17,505	0–1
2	May 19	@ L.A. Lakers	L 104–112	Dale Ellis (22)	Xavier McDaniel (8)	Nate McMillan (7)	The Forum; 17,505	0–2
3	May 23	L.A. Lakers	L 121–122	Xavier McDaniel (42)	Xavier McDaniel (10)	Nate McMillan (15)	Seattle Center Coliseum; 14,657	0–3
4	May 25	L.A. Lakers	L 102–133	Tom Chambers (20)	Alton Lister (20)	Kevin Williams (5)	Seattle Center Coliseum; 14,477	0–4

1987 schedule

== Player statistics ==
Legend
GP	Games played	GS	Games started	MPG	Minutes per game
FG%	Field-goal percentage	3P%	3-point field-goal percentage	FT%	Free-throw percentage
RPG	Rebounds per game	APG	Assists per game	SPG	Steals per game
BPG	Blocks per game	PPG	Points per game

=== Season ===
Player	GP	GS	MPG	FG%	3FG%	FT%	RPG	APG	SPG	BPG	PPG
Tom Chambers	82	82	36.8	.456	.372	.849	6.6	3.0	1.0	.6	23.3
Dale Ellis	82	76	37.5	.516	.358	.787	5.5	2.9	1.3	.4	24.9
Gerald Henderson^{1}	6	6	25.8	.500	.000	.944	1.5	5.3	1.0	.0	11.2
Clemon Johnson	78	7	13.5	.494	.000	.636	3.6	.3	.3	.5	3.2
Eddie Johnson	24	0	21.2	.457	.333	.764	1.9	4.8	.5	.0	9.0
Curtis Kitchen	6	0	5.2	.500	.000	.750	1.5	.2	.3	.5	1.5
Alton Lister	75	75	30.5	.504	.000	.675	9.4	1.5	.4	2.4	11.6
Maurice Lucas	63	0	17.8	.451	.000	.802	4.9	1.0	.5	.3	7.9
Xavier McDaniel	82	82	37.0	.509	.214	.696	8.6	2.5	1.4	.6	23.0
Nate McMillan	71	50	27.8	.475	.000	.617	4.7	8.2	1.8	.6	5.3
Mike Phelps	60	6	7.8	.426	.100	.705	.8	1.1	.4	.0	3.0
Russ Schoene	63	0	9.2	.374	.154	.630	1.9	.4	.3	.2	2.7
Terence Stansbury	44	0	8.5	.429	.379	.620	.5	1.3	.3	.0	4.0
Kevin Williams	65	0	10.8	.446	.000	.833	1.3	1.0	.7	.1	4.9
Danny Young	73	26	20.3	.458	.367	.831	1.5	4.8	1.0	.0	4.8

1. Statistics with the SuperSonics.

=== Playoffs ===
Player	GP	GS	MPG	FG%	3FG%	FT%	RPG	APG	SPG	BPG	PPG
Tom Chambers	14		35.6	.449	.353	.808	6.4	2.3	.9	.9	23.0
Dale Ellis	14		37.9	.487	.361	.815	6.4	2.6	.7	.4	25.2
Clemon Johnson	14		18.7	.453	.000	.632	3.5	.3	1.1	.2	4.3
Eddie Johnson	14		12.9	.534	.400	.867	1.0	3.2	.6	.0	6.4
Curtis Kitchen	8		12.9	.500	.000	.000	.8	.0	.0	.4	.3
Alton Lister	9		22.9	.400	.000	.700	6.2	.8	.8	1.4	6.0
Maurice Lucas	14		18.9	.389	.000	.737	4.6	1.4	.9	.4	7.0
Xavier McDaniel	14		37.7	.488	.200	.607	8.4	3.0	1.5	.6	20.3
Nate McMillan	14		25.4	.435	.000	.708	3.9	8.0	1.0	.7	5.1
Russ Schoene	14		8.8	.357	.333	.750	1.9	.2	.1	.3	2.2
Kevin Williams	14		18.2	.479	.000	.750	2.4	2.1	1.1	.1	8.6
Danny Young	14		14.9	.404	.313	1.000	1.1	3.4	1.1	.0	4.1

== Awards and records ==
=== Awards ===
- Dale Ellis won the Most Improved Player Award at the end of the season.
- Tom Chambers participated in the 1987 NBA All-Star Game and won the game's Most Valuable Player Award. He also was named Player of the Week between December 1 and December 7.

== Transactions ==
=== Overview ===
Players Added

Via draft

- Nate McMillan
- Curtis Kitchen
- Dominic Pressley

Via free agency

- Kevin Williams
- Maurice Lucas
- Eddie Johnson
- Curtis Kitchen

Via trade

- Alton Lister
- Dale Ellis
- Clemon Johnson
- Russ Schoene
- Terence Stansbury
- Ronnie Lester
- John Long
Players Lost

Via free agency

- John Schweitz
- Frank Brickowski

Via trade

- Jack Sikma
- Al Wood
- Tim McCormick
- Danny Vranes
- John Long

Via waiver

- Dominic Pressley

=== Trades ===
July 1, 1986	To Seattle SuperSonics Alton Lister Conditional 1987 and 1989 first-round picks	To Milwaukee Bucks Jack Sikma Conditional 1987 and 1989 second-round picks
July 23, 1986	To Seattle SuperSonics Dale Ellis	To Dallas Mavericks Al Wood
September 29, 1986	To Seattle SuperSonics Clemon Johnson Conditional 1989 first-round pick	To Philadelphia 76ers Tim McCormick Danny Vranes
September 30, 1986	To Seattle SuperSonics John Long	To Detroit Pistons Conditional 1987 and 1991 second-round picks
October 2, 1986	To Seattle SuperSonics Russ Schoene Terence Stansbury	To Indiana Pacers John Long Conditional 1993 second-round pick
October 2, 1986	To Seattle SuperSonics Ronnie Lester	To Los Angeles Lakers Cash considerations
November 12, 1986	To Seattle SuperSonics Conditional 1987 first round and 1990 second-round picks	To New York Knicks Gerald Henderson Conditional 1987 first-round pick

=== Free agents ===
==== Additions ====
Player	Signed	Former team
Kevin Williams	July 11, 1986	Cleveland Cavaliers
Maurice Lucas	September 30, 1986	Los Angeles Lakers
Eddie Johnson	March 23, 1987	Cleveland Cavaliers

==== Subtractions ====
Player	Left	New team
John Schweitz	September 5, 1986	Golden State Warriors
Frank Brickowski	October 8, 1986	Los Angeles Lakers

== See also ==
- 1986–87 NBA season
