= 1986–87 Los Angeles Lakers season =

Pro basketball team season (won NBA championship)

- NBA champions
- Conference champions
- Division champions
- Head coach: Pat Riley
- General manager: Jerry West
- Owners: Jerry Buss
- Arena: The Forum

Results
- Record: 65–17 (.793)
- Place: Division: 1st (Pacific); Conference: 1st (Western)
- Playoff finish: NBA champions (Defeated Celtics 4–2)
- Stats at Basketball Reference

Local media
- Television: Prime Ticket, KHJ
- Radio: AM 570 KLAC

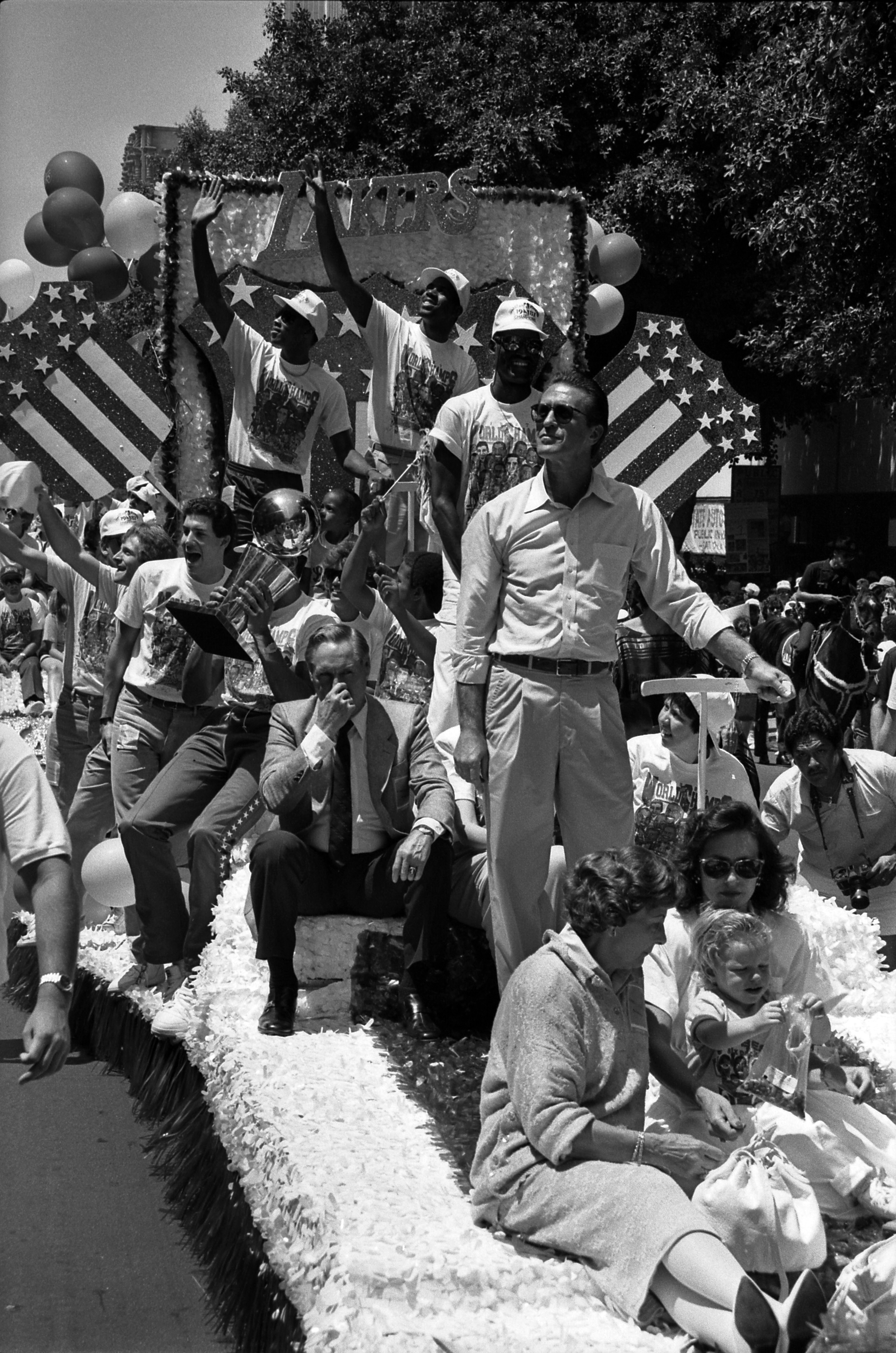
Championship parade, June 1987

The 1986–87 Los Angeles Lakers season was the 41st season of the franchise, 39th in the National Basketball Association (NBA) and 27th in Los Angeles. Coming from a shocking defeat to the Houston Rockets in the previous season's Western Conference Finals in five games, where they won the first game, but proceeded to drop the next four, the Lakers avenged their playoff upset by making the NBA Finals for the sixth time in the 1980s. Prior to reaching the NBA Finals, in the playoffs, the Lakers swept the Denver Nuggets in three games in the First Round, defeated the Golden State Warriors in five games in the Semi-finals, and swept the Seattle SuperSonics in four games in the Conference Finals.

The highlight of the season saw the Lakers winning the NBA Finals, and their tenth NBA title (fifth in Los Angeles) over the defending NBA champions and rivals, the Boston Celtics, in six games. This marked the third and final time the Lakers and Celtics faced off against each other in the NBA Finals in the 1980s, as well as the last time the Lakers and Celtics faced off against each other in the NBA Finals until 2008, where the Celtics defeated the Lakers 4–2 to win their 17th NBA championship. The two teams would then meet again in 2010, where the Lakers defeated the Celtics 4–3 to win their 16th NBA championship. HoopsHype would later rank this squad as the team with the seventh-easiest route to winning the NBA Finals in 2024 due to the fact that outside of the rivaling Celtics, two of their three opponents the Lakers faced off against had losing records in the Western Conference, with the only other team they played against in the Golden State Warriors holding a 42–40 record instead.

== Draft picks ==
Round	Pick	Player	Nationality	School/Club team
1	23	Ken Barlow	United States	Notre Dame
3	69	Andre Turner	United States	Memphis State

== Roster ==
Los Angeles Lakers roster
Players

Pos.	No.	Player	Height	Weight	DOB	From
C	33	Kareem Abdul-Jabbar	7 ft 2 in (2.18 m)	225 lb (102 kg)	1947-04-16	UCLA
SF	24	Adrian Branch	6 ft 7 in (2.01 m)	185 lb (84 kg)	1963-11-17	Maryland
SG	21	Michael Cooper	6 ft 5 in (1.96 m)	170 lb (77 kg)	1956-04-15	New Mexico
PF	45	A.C. Green	6 ft 9 in (2.06 m)	220 lb (100 kg)	1963-10-04	Oregon State
PG	32	Magic Johnson	6 ft 9 in (2.06 m)	215 lb (98 kg)	1959-08-14	Michigan State
PG	1	Wes Matthews	6 ft 1 in (1.85 m)	170 lb (77 kg)	1959-08-24	Wisconsin
PF	31	Kurt Rambis	6 ft 8 in (2.03 m)	213 lb (97 kg)	1958-02-25	Santa Clara
SG	4	Byron Scott	6 ft 3 in (1.91 m)	195 lb (88 kg)	1961-03-28	Arizona State
C	52	Mike Smrek	7 ft 0 in (2.13 m)	250 lb (113 kg)	1962-08-31	Canisius
SF	55	Billy Thompson	6 ft 7 in (2.01 m)	195 lb (88 kg)	1963-12-01	Louisville
PF	43	Mychal Thompson	6 ft 10 in (2.08 m)	226 lb (103 kg)	1955-01-30	Minnesota
SF	42	James Worthy	6 ft 9 in (2.06 m)	225 lb (102 kg)	1961-02-27	North Carolina

Coaches
Head coach
- Pat Riley
Assistant(s)
- Bill Bertka
- Randy Pfund
- Gary Vitti (trainer)

Legend
- (DP) Unsigned draft pick
- (FA) Free agent
- (S) Suspended
- Injured

Roster
Updated: February 13, 1987

== Regular season ==
=== Season standings ===
Pacific Division	W	L	PCT	GB	Home	Road	Div
y-Los Angeles Lakers	65	17	.793	–	37–4	28–13	24–6
x-Portland Trail Blazers	49	33	.598	16	34–7	15–26	17–13
x-Golden State Warriors	42	40	.512	23	25–16	17–24	17–13
x-Seattle SuperSonics	39	43	.476	26	25–16	14–27	15–15
Phoenix Suns	36	46	.439	29	26–15	10–31	14–16
Los Angeles Clippers	12	70	.146	53	9–32	3–38	3–27

#	Western Conference				
#	Team	W	L	PCT	GB
1	z-Los Angeles Lakers	65	17	.793	–
2	y-Dallas Mavericks	55	27	.671	10
3	x-Portland Trail Blazers	49	33	.598	16
4	x-Utah Jazz	44	38	.537	21
5	x-Golden State Warriors	42	40	.512	23
6	x-Houston Rockets	42	40	.512	23
7	x-Seattle SuperSonics	39	43	.476	26
8	x-Denver Nuggets	37	45	.451	28
9	Phoenix Suns	36	46	.439	29
10	Sacramento Kings	29	53	.354	36
11	San Antonio Spurs	28	54	.341	37
12	Los Angeles Clippers	12	70	.146	53

== Game log ==
=== Regular season ===
1986–87 game log
Total: 65–17 (Home: 37–4; Road: 28–13)
November: 12–2 (home: 8–1; road: 4–1)

Game	Date	Team	Score	High points	High rebounds	High assists	Location Attendance	Record
1	November 1	@ Houston	L 102-112	Kareem Abdul-Jabbar (27)	Kurt Rambis (13)	Magic Johnson (10)	The Summit; 16,016	0–1
2	November 4	@ Seattle	W 110-96	James Worthy (26)	Kurt Rambis (17)	Magic Johnson (10)	Seattle Center Coliseum; 10,426	1-1
3	November 7	Denver	W 138-116	James Worthy (30)	Abdul-Jabbar & Brickowski (9)	Magic Johnson (18)	The Forum; 15,872	2–1
4	November 9	New York	W 111-88	James Worthy (22)	Abdul-Jabbar & B. Thompson (6)	Magic Johnson (15)	The Forum; 17,505	3–1
5	November 12	Seattle	W 122-97	Kareem Abdul-Jabbar (25)	Kurt Rambis (9)	Magic Johnson (10)	The Forum; 13,694	4–1
6	November 16	Sacramento	W 113-111	Magic Johnson (34)	Kurt Rambis (12)	Magic Johnson (12)	The Forum; 13,421	5–1
7	November 18	@ Dallas	W 114-110	Magic Johnson (29)	Kareem Abdul-Jabbar (10)	Magic Johnson (9)	Reunion Arena; 17,007	6–1
8	November 19	@ San Antonio	W 117-108	Magic Johnson (25)	Kareem Abdul-Jabbar (11)	Magic Johnson (13)	HemisFair Arena; 10,581	7–1
9	November 21	New Jersey	W 111-95	James Worthy (26)	Kareem Abdul-Jabbar (10)	Magic Johnson (10)	The Forum; 14,918	8–1
10	November 23	Milwaukee	W 127-117	Magic Johnson (23)	Byron Scott (9)	Magic Johnson (10)	The Forum; 16,251	9–1
11	November 25	Atlanta	L 107-113	Magic Johnson (22)	A.C. Green (7)	Abdul-Jabbar & Johnson (8)	The Forum; 17,505	9–2
12	November 26	@ L.A. Clippers	W 126-92	A.C. Green (19)	A.C. Green (7)	Magic Johnson (14)	Los Angeles Memorial Sports Arena; 12,110	10–2
13	November 28	Chicago	W 110-103	Magic Johnson (30)	A.C. Green (12)	Magic Johnson (9)	The Forum; 17,505	11–2
14	November 30	L.A. Clippers	W 137-115	Byron Scott (26)	Billy Thompson (13)	Magic Johnson (13)	The Forum; 13,099	12–2

December: 10–4 (home: 5–0; road: 5–4)

Game	Date	Team	Score	High points	High rebounds	High assists	Location Attendance	Record
15	December 4	@ Golden State	L 106-116	Magic Johnson (28)	James Worthy (12)	Johnson & Scott (6)	Oakland-Alameda County Coliseum Arena; 15,025	12–3
16	December 5	Dallas	W 112-104	Magic Johnson (27)	Abdul-Jabbar & Johnson (8)	Magic Johnson (10)	The Forum; 15,896	13–3
17	December 7	Golden State	W 132-100	Byron Scott (26)	A.C. Green (9)	Magic Johnson (13)	The Forum; 14,937	14–3
18	December 9	@ New York	W 113-87	Magic Johnson (22)	Abdul-Jabbar & Johnson (8)	Magic Johnson (15)	Madison Square Garden; 19,320	15–3
19	December 10	@ Milwaukee	L 93-116	James Worthy (24)	James Worthy (6)	Wes Matthews (6)	MECCA Arena; 11,052	15–4
20	December 12	@ Boston	W 117-110	Magic Johnson (31)	A.C. Green (11)	Magic Johnson (8)	Boston Garden; 14,890	16–4
21	December 13	@ Detroit	L 114-119	Magic Johnson (34)	Kareem Abdul-Jabbar (11)	Magic Johnson (9)	Pontiac Silverdome; 33,447	16–5
22	December 16	@ Cleveland	W 121-116	Abdul-Jabbar & Johnson (25)	Magic Johnson (11)	Magic Johnson (14)	Richfield Coliseum; 17,755	17–5
23	December 18	Portland	W 131-115	Byron Scott (27)	Kareem Abdul-Jabbar (14)	Magic Johnson (18)	The Forum; 15,007	18–5
24	December 20	@ Dallas	L 119-130	Magic Johnson (34)	A.C. Green (15)	Magic Johnson (15)	Reunion Arena; 17,007	18–6
25	December 21	@ Houston	W 103-96	Magic Johnson (38)	A.C. Green (16)	Magic Johnson (16)	The Summit; 16,016	19–6
26	December 23	@ Sacramento	W 127-117 (OT)	Magic Johnson (46)	A.C. Green (16)	Magic Johnson (9)	ARCO Arena I 10,333	20–6
27	December 26	Houston	W 134-111	Magic Johnson (30)	Kurt Rambis (6)	Magic Johnson (15)	The Forum; 17,505	21–6
28	December 28	Philadelphia	W 111-85	Magic Johnson (28)	Kareem Abdul-Jabbar (9)	Magic Johnson (9)	The Forum; 17,505	22–6

January: 12–4 (home: 6–0; road: 6–4)

Game	Date	Team	Score	High points	High rebounds	High assists	Location Attendance	Record
29	January 1	@ Portland	W 140-104	Byron Scott (31)	A.C. Green (9)	Magic Johnson (18)	Memorial Coliseum; 12,666	23–6
30	January 2	Phoenix	W 155-118	Magic Johnson (32)	A.C. Green (12)	Magic Johnson (14)	The Forum; 17,505	24–6
31	January 4	Utah	W 121-113	Magic Johnson (26)	Magic Johnson (10)	Magic Johnson (11)	The Forum; 17,505	25–6
32	January 7	Denver	W 147-109	Byron Scott (23)	A.C. Green (10)	Magic Johnson (12)	The Forum; 15,777	26–6
33	January 8	@ Utah	L 101-107	Magic Johnson (25)	A.C. Green (14)	Magic Johnson (9)	Salt Palace; 12,212	26–7
34	January 10	@ Golden State	L 109-124	Magic Johnson (38)	Green & Rambis (7)	Magic Johnson (7)	Oakland-Alameda County Coliseum Arena; 15,025	26–8
35	January 11	San Antonio	W 111-109	James Worthy (30)	Kurt Rambis (6)	Magic Johnson (9)	The Forum; 15,294	27–8
36	January 15	Golden State	W 129-109	Johnson & Worthy (31)	James Worthy (13)	Magic Johnson (12)	The Forum; 17,505	28–8
37	January 18	@ Washington	W 115-101	Magic Johnson (26)	A.C. Green (10)	Magic Johnson (10)	Capital Centre; 19,411	29–8
38	January 19	@ New Jersey	W 126-115	Magic Johnson (42)	Magic Johnson (11)	Abdul-Jabbar & Johnson (7)	Brendan Byrne Arena; 14,197	30–8
39	January 21	@ Atlanta	W 112-109	James Worthy (27)	Green & Worthy (11)	Magic Johnson (9)	Omni Coliseum; 16,522	31–8
40	January 22	@ Indiana	W 118-108	Magic Johnson (29)	Johnson & Rambis (10)	Magic Johnson (11)	Market Square Arena; 16,912	32–8
41	January 24	@ Dallas	L 117-132	Magic Johnson (25)	James Worthy (8)	Magic Johnson (12)	Reunion Arena; 17,007	32–9
42	January 27	Portland	W 107-100	Byron Scott (21)	Kareem Abdul-Jabbar (10)	Magic Johnson (11)	The Forum; 15,989	33–9
43	January 28	@ Seattle	L 101-125	Magic Johnson (24)	Kareem Abdul-Jabbar (11)	Magic Johnson (11)	Seattle Center Coliseum; 14,634	33–10
44	January 30	@ Phoenix	W 114-102	A.C. Green (24)	Kareem Abdul-Jabbar (9)	Magic Johnson (19)	Arizona Veterans Memorial Coliseum; 14,471	34–10

February: 10–4 (home: 5–2; road: 5–2)

Game	Date	Team	Score	High points	High rebounds	High assists	Location Attendance	Record
45	February 2	Dallas	L 99-103	Byron Scott (21)	A.C. Green (9)	Michael Cooper (10)	The Forum; 17,505	34–11
46	February 4	Sacramento	W 128-92	Byron Scott (21)	A.C. Green (11)	Magic Johnson (17)	The Forum; 14,729	35–11
47	February 5	@ Portland	L 104-105	Magic Johnson (26)	A.C. Green (16)	Magic Johnson (10)	Memorial Coliseum; 12,666	35–12
All-Star Break
48	February 10	@ Sacramento	W 114-98	Byron Scott (30)	Kurt Rambis (11)	Magic Johnson (13)	ARCO Arena I 10,333	36–12
49	February 13	Indiana	W 113-108	Magic Johnson (40)	James Worthy (9)	Cooper & Johnson (7)	The Forum; 17,505	37–12
50	February 15	Boston	W 106-103	Magic Johnson (39)	Johnson & Worthy (7)	Magic Johnson (10)	The Forum; 17,505	38–12
51	February 17	Washington	L 99-114	James Worthy (21)	Kurt Rambis (13)	Magic Johnson (10)	The Forum; 17,505	38–13
52	February 18	@ Denver	W 128-122	Magic Johnson (37)	Kareem Abdul-Jabbar (11)	Magic Johnson (16)	McNichols Sports Arena; 17,022	39–13
53	February 20	@ Chicago	W 110-100	Magic Johnson (28)	Kareem Abdul-Jabbar (7)	Magic Johnson (16)	Chicago Stadium; 18,079	40–13
54	February 22	@ Philadelphia	W 112-110 (OT)	James Worthy (24)	A.C. Green (10)	Magic Johnson (18)	The Spectrum; 17,967	41–13
55	February 24	@ Phoenix	W 97-93	Cooper & Scott (21)	A.C. Green (15)	Michael Cooper (7)	Arizona Veterans Memorial Coliseum; 12,686	42–13
56	February 25	Phoenix	W 99-91	Kareem Abdul-Jabbar (26)	Abdul-Jabbar & Cooper (9)	Michael Cooper (8)	The Forum; 16,416	43–13
57	February 27	Golden State	W 121-109	Kareem Abdul-Jabbar (30)	A.C. Green (11)	Magic Johnson (15)	The Forum; 17,505	44–13
58	February 28	@ Utah	L 100-107	Magic Johnson (24)	A.C. Green (9)	Magic Johnson (14)	Salt Palace; 12,212	44–14

March: 13–1 (home: 10–0; road: 3–1)

Game	Date	Team	Score	High points	High rebounds	High assists	Location Attendance	Record
59	March 3	@ Golden State	W 114-109	Byron Scott (26)	A.C. Green (12)	Magic Johnson (17)	Oakland-Alameda County Coliseum Arena; 15,025	45–14
60	March 4	Seattle	W 138-124	Magic Johnson (31)	A.C. Green (11)	Magic Johnson (19)	The Forum; 17,505	46–14
61	March 7	Cleveland	W 122-118	James Worthy (31)	3 players tied (8)	Magic Johnson (17)	The Forum; 17,505	47–14
62	March 9	@ L.A. Clippers	W 136-114	Byron Scott (30)	A.C. Green (11)	Magic Johnson (15)	Los Angeles Memorial Sports Arena; 12,067	48–14
63	March 10	Denver	W 143-107	James Worthy (23)	Kurt Rambis (15)	Magic Johnson (20)	The Forum; 17,505	49–14
64	March 12	Portland	W 125-116	Magic Johnson (25)	Cooper & Rambis (7)	Magic Johnson (16)	The Forum; 17,505	50–14
65	March 15	L.A. Clippers	W 115-101	Magic Johnson (20)	Kurt Rambis (18)	Magic Johnson (10)	The Forum; 17,505	51–14
66	March 18	Utah	W 111-97	Magic Johnson (27)	A.C. Green (13)	Magic Johnson (19)	The Forum; 17,505	52–14
67	March 20	San Antonio	W 147-115	Byron Scott (22)	A.C. Green (17)	Magic Johnson (11)	The Forum; 17,505	53–14
68	March 22	Sacramento	W 129-121	Magic Johnson (33)	Magic Johnson (12)	Magic Johnson (19)	The Forum; 17,505	54–14
69	March 24	@ Phoenix	L 93-108	James Worthy (23)	A.C. Green (11)	Michael Cooper (9)	Arizona Veterans Memorial Coliseum; 12,907	54–15
70	March 26	Detroit	W 128-111	Byron Scott (25)	A.C. Green (14)	Magic Johnson (15)	The Forum; 17,505	55–15
71	March 28	@ Houston	W 123-109	Magic Johnson (31)	Kareem Abdul-Jabbar (12)	Magic Johnson (13)	The Summit; 16,279	56–15
72	March 31	Houston	W 111-96	Magic Johnson (21)	Magic Johnson (10)	Magic Johnson (13)	The Forum; 17,505	57–15

April: 8–2 (home: 3–1; road: 5–1)

Game	Date	Team	Score	High points	High rebounds	High assists	Location Attendance	Record
73	April 2	@ Seattle	W 117-114	Magic Johnson (34)	Abdul-Jabbar & Johnson (10)	Magic Johnson (13)	Seattle Center Coliseum; 14,739	58–15
74	April 3	@ Portland	W 127-121	Magic Johnson (35)	Magic Johnson (10)	Magic Johnson (11)	Memorial Coliseum; 12,666	59–15
75	April 5	@ Denver	W 126-118	Magic Johnson (23)	A.C. Green (12)	Magic Johnson (10)	McNichols Sports Arena; 17,022	60–15
76	April 6	L.A. Clippers	W 135-112	James Worthy (20)	A.C. Green (10)	Magic Johnson (16)	The Forum; 14,777	61–15
77	April 9	@ L.A. Clippers	W 118-100	Magic Johnson (28)	Kurt Rambis (10)	Magic Johnson (11)	Los Angeles Memorial Sports Arena; 13,801	62–15
78	April 10	San Antonio	W 131-121	James Worthy (24)	A.C. Green (14)	Magic Johnson (13)	The Forum; 17,505	63–15
79	April 12	Phoenix	W 119-104	James Worthy (26)	A.C. Green (11)	Magic Johnson (19)	The Forum; 17,505	64–15
80	April 16	@ Utah	W 110-97	Magic Johnson (31)	Kareem Abdul-Jabbar & Worthy (10)	Magic Johnson (8)	Salt Palace; 12,212	65–15
81	April 17	@ San Antonio	L 103-115	Mychal Thompson (20)	Kurt Rambis (7)	Johnson & Worthy (6)	HemisFair Arena; 12,872	65–16
82	April 19	Seattle	L 104-110	Byron Scott (25)	Mychal Thompson (12)	Magic Johnson (7)	The Forum; 17,505	65–17

1986–87 schedule

=== Playoffs ===
1987 playoff game log
Total: 15–3 (Home: 10–0; Road: 5–3)
First Round: 3–0 (home: 2–0; road: 1–0)

Game	Date	Team	Score	High points	High rebounds	High assists	Location Attendance	Series
1	April 23	Denver	W 128–95	James Worthy (28)	Mychal Thompson (9)	Magic Johnson (14)	The Forum; 17,505	1–0
2	April 25	Denver	W 139–127	Kareem Abdul-Jabbar (28)	A.C. Green (13)	Magic Johnson (15)	The Forum; 17,297	2–0
3	April 29	@ Denver	W 140–103	Byron Scott (25)	A.C. Green (10)	Magic Johnson (14)	McNichols Sports Arena; 15,137	3–0

Conference Semi-finals: 4–1 (home: 3–0; road: 1–1)

Game	Date	Team	Score	High points	High rebounds	High assists	Location Attendance	Series
1	May 5	Golden State	W 125–116	James Worthy (28)	Magic Johnson (12)	Magic Johnson (14)	The Forum; 17,505	1–0
2	May 7	Golden State	W 116–101	Kareem Abdul-Jabbar (25)	3 players tied (8)	Michael Cooper (12)	The Forum; 17,505	2–0
3	May 9	@ Golden State	W 133–108	James Worthy (28)	Mychal Thompson (12)	Magic Johnson (14)	Oakland–Alameda County Coliseum Arena; 15,025	3–0
4	May 10	@ Golden State	L 121–129	Byron Scott (28)	A.C. Green (12)	Michael Cooper (10)	Oakland–Alameda County Coliseum Arena; 15,025	3–1
5	May 12	Golden State	W 116–108	James Worthy (23)	Kareem Abdul-Jabbar (9)	Magic Johnson (13)	The Forum; 17,505	4–1

Conference Finals: 4–0 (home: 2–0; road: 2–0)

Game	Date	Team	Score	High points	High rebounds	High assists	Location Attendance	Series
1	May 16	Seattle	W 87–82	James Worthy (27)	Magic Johnson (7)	Magic Johnson (11)	The Forum; 17,505	1–0
2	May 19	Seattle	W 112–104	James Worthy (30)	A.C. Green (14)	Magic Johnson (10)	The Forum; 17,505	2–0
3	May 23	@ Seattle	W 122–121	James Worthy (39)	Kareem Abdul-Jabbar (10)	Magic Johnson (11)	Seattle Center Coliseum; 14,657	3–0
4	May 25	@ Seattle	W 133–102	James Worthy (26)	A.C. Green (13)	Magic Johnson (12)	Seattle Center Coliseum; 14,477	4–0

NBA Finals: 4–2 (home: 3–0; road: 1–2)

Game	Date	Team	Score	High points	High rebounds	High assists	Location Attendance	Series
1	June 2	Boston	W 126–113	James Worthy (33)	Kareem Abdul-Jabbar (10)	Magic Johnson (13)	The Forum; 17,505	1–0
2	June 4	Boston	W 141–122	Byron Scott (24)	Johnson & Rambis (5)	Magic Johnson (20)	The Forum; 17,505	2–0
3	June 7	@ Boston	L 103–109	Magic Johnson (32)	Magic Johnson (11)	Magic Johnson (9)	Boston Garden; 14,890	2–1
4	June 9	@ Boston	W 107–106	Magic Johnson (29)	Kareem Abdul-Jabbar (11)	Cooper & Johnson (5)	Boston Garden; 14,890	3–1
5	June 11	@ Boston	L 108–123	Magic Johnson (29)	Magic Johnson (8)	Magic Johnson (12)	Boston Garden; 14,890	3–2
6	June 14	Boston	W 106–93	Kareem Abdul-Jabbar (32)	Mychal Thompson (9)	Magic Johnson (19)	The Forum; 17,505	4–2

1987 schedule

== Player statistics ==
Note: GP= Games played; MPG= Minutes per Game; REB = Rebounds; AST = Assists; STL = Steals; BLK = Blocks; PTS = Points; PPG = Points per Game

=== Season ===
Player	GP	MPG	REB	AST	STL	BLK	PTS	PPG
Magic Johnson	80	36.3	504	977	138	36	1909	23.8
James Worthy	82	34.4	466	226	108	83	1594	19.4
Byron Scott	82	33.3	286	281	125	18	1397	17.0
Kareem Abdul-Jabbar	78	31.3	523	203	49	97	1366	17.5
Michael Cooper	82	27.5	254	373	78	43	859	10.5
A.C. Green	79	28.4	615	84	70	80	852	10.8
Kurt Rambis	78	19.4	453	63	74	41	446	5.7
Mychal Thompson	33	20.6	136	28	14	30	333	10.1
Billy Thompson	59	12.9	171	60	15	30	332	5.6
Wes Matthews	50	10.6	47	100	23	4	208	4.2
Frank Brickowski	37	10.9	97	12	14	4	146	3.9
Adrian Branch	32	6.8	53	16	16	3	138	4.3
Mike Smrek	35	6.7	37	5	4	13	76	2.2

== Award winners ==
- Magic Johnson, NBA Most Valuable Player Award
- Magic Johnson, NBA Finals Most Valuable Player Award
- Michael Cooper, NBA Defensive Player of the Year Award
- Magic Johnson, All-NBA First Team
- Michael Cooper, NBA All-Defensive First Team
