= 1986–87 Dallas Mavericks season =

NBA professional basketball team season

- Division champions
- Head coach: Dick Motta
- General manager: Norm Sonju
- Owner: Don Carter
- Arena: Reunion Arena

Results
- Record: 55–27 (.671)
- Place: Division: 1st (Midwest); Conference: 2nd (Western)
- Playoff finish: First round (lost to SuperSonics 1–3)
- Stats at Basketball Reference

The 1986–87 Dallas Mavericks season was the Mavericks' 7th season in the NBA.

After winning Game 1 in a high-scoring affair, the underdog Seattle SuperSonics took the next three games, ending the Mavericks season.

The season saw the team draft Roy Tarpley and Mark Price. However, Price would be traded to the Cleveland Cavaliers after refusing to report to Dallas.

== Draft picks ==
Round	Pick	Player	Position	Nationality	College
1	7	Roy Tarpley	PF/C	United States	Michigan
2	25	Mark Price	PG	United States	Georgia Tech
2	35	Milt Wagner	SG/PG	United States	Louisville
3	62	Anthony Welch		United States	Illinois
4	85	Myron Jackson	G	United States	Arkansas-Little Rock
5	108	Jay Bilas		United States	Duke
6	131	Cadillac Anderson	PF/C	United States	Lamar
7	154	Kim Cooksey		United States	Middle Tennessee State

== Roster ==
1986–87 Dallas Mavericks roster
Players

Pos.	No.	Player	Height	Weight	DOB	From
SF	24	Mark Aguirre	6 ft 6 in (1.98 m)	232 lb (105 kg)	1959-12-10	DePaul
C	33	Uwe Blab	7 ft 1 in (2.16 m)	252 lb (114 kg)	1962-03-26	Indiana
SG	22	Rolando Blackman	6 ft 6 in (1.98 m)	190 lb (86 kg)	1959-02-26	Kansas State
PG	15	Brad Davis	6 ft 3 in (1.91 m)	180 lb (82 kg)	1955-12-17	Maryland
C	40	James Donaldson	7 ft 2 in (2.18 m)	275 lb (125 kg)	1957-08-16	Washington State
PG	12	Derek Harper	6 ft 4 in (1.93 m)	185 lb (84 kg)	1961-10-13	Illinois
PG	21	Dennis Nutt	6 ft 2 in (1.88 m)	170 lb (77 kg)	1963-03-25	TCU
PF	44	Sam Perkins	6 ft 9 in (2.06 m)	239 lb (108 kg)	1961-06-14	North Carolina
SF	32	Detlef Schrempf	6 ft 9 in (2.06 m)	214 lb (97 kg)	1963-01-21	Washington
PF	42	Roy Tarpley	6 ft 11 in (2.11 m)	230 lb (104 kg)	1964-11-28	Michigan
C	23	Bill Wennington	7 ft 0 in (2.13 m)	245 lb (111 kg)	1963-12-26	St. John's
SG	4	Al Wood	6 ft 6 in (1.98 m)	193 lb (88 kg)	1958-06-02	North Carolina

Coaches
Head coach
- Dick Motta
Assistant(s)
- Richie Adubato

Legend
- (DP) Unsigned draft pick
- (FA) Free agent
- (S) Suspended
- Injured

Roster
Updated: December 30, 1986

== Regular season ==
=== Season standings ===
Midwest Division	W	L	PCT	GB	Home	Road	Div
y-Dallas Mavericks	55	27	.671	–	35–6	20–21	19–11
x-Utah Jazz	44	38	.537	11	31–10	13–28	19–11
x-Houston Rockets	42	40	.512	13	25–16	17–24	19–11
x-Denver Nuggets	37	45	.451	18	27–14	10–31	14–16
Sacramento Kings	29	53	.354	26	20–21	9–32	10–20
San Antonio Spurs	28	54	.341	27	21–20	7–34	9–21

#	Western Conference				
#	Team	W	L	PCT	GB
1	z-Los Angeles Lakers	65	17	.793	–
2	y-Dallas Mavericks	55	27	.671	10
3	x-Portland Trail Blazers	49	33	.598	16
4	x-Utah Jazz	44	38	.537	21
5	x-Golden State Warriors	42	40	.512	23
6	x-Houston Rockets	42	40	.512	23
7	x-Seattle SuperSonics	39	43	.476	26
8	x-Denver Nuggets	37	45	.451	28
9	Phoenix Suns	36	46	.439	29
10	Sacramento Kings	29	53	.354	36
11	San Antonio Spurs	28	54	.341	37
12	Los Angeles Clippers	12	70	.146	53

z – clinched division title
y – clinched division title
x – clinched playoff spot

=== Game log ===
1986–87 game log
Total: 55–27 (home: 0–0; road: 0–0)
October: 0–0 (home: 0–0; road: 0–0)

Game	Date	Team	Score	High points	High rebounds	High assists	Location Attendance	Record

November: 0–0 (home: 0–0; road: 0–0)

Game	Date	Team	Score	High points	High rebounds	High assists	Location Attendance	Record

December: 0–0 (home: 0–0; road: 0–0)

Game	Date	Team	Score	High points	High rebounds	High assists	Location Attendance	Record

January: 0–0 (home: 0–0; road: 0–0)

Game	Date	Team	Score	High points	High rebounds	High assists	Location Attendance	Record

February: 0–0 (home: 0–0; road: 0–0)

Game	Date	Team	Score	High points	High rebounds	High assists	Location Attendance	Record

March: 0–0 (home: 0–0; road: 0–0)

Game	Date	Team	Score	High points	High rebounds	High assists	Location Attendance	Record

April: 0–0 (home: 0–0; road: 0–0)

Game	Date	Team	Score	High points	High rebounds	High assists	Location Attendance	Record

1986–87 schedule

== Playoffs ==
1987 playoff game log
First Round: 1–3 (home: 1–1; road: 0–2)

Game	Date	Team	Score	High points	High rebounds	High assists	Location Attendance	Series
1	April 23	Seattle	W 151–129	Mark Aguirre (28)	Roy Tarpley (11)	Brad Davis (9)	Reunion Arena; 17,007	1–0
2	April 25	Seattle	L 110–112	Mark Aguirre (28)	Roy Tarpley (8)	Derek Harper (8)	Reunion Arena; 17,007	1–1
3	April 28	@ Seattle	L 107–117	Derek Harper (30)	Sam Perkins (11)	Derek Harper (8)	Hec Edmundson Pavilion; 8,150	1–2
4	April 30	@ Seattle	L 98–124	Rolando Blackman (25)	Roy Tarpley (17)	Derek Harper (5)	Hec Edmundson Pavilion; 8,150	1–3

1987 schedule

== Player statistics ==
=== Ragular season ===
Player	POS	GP	GS	MP	REB	AST	STL	BLK	PTS	MPG	RPG	APG	SPG	BPG	PPG
James Donaldson	C	82	82	3,028	973	63	51	136	889	36.9	11.9	.8	.6	1.7	10.8
Brad Davis	PG	82	6	1,582	114	373	63	10	577	19.3	1.4	4.5	.8	.1	7.0
Detlef Schrempf	SF	81	5	1,711	303	161	50	16	756	21.1	3.7	2.0	.6	.2	9.3
Rolando Blackman	SG	80	80	2,758	278	266	64	21	1,676	34.5	3.5	3.3	.8	.3	21.0
Sam Perkins	PF	80	80	2,687	616	146	109	77	1,186	33.6	7.7	1.8	1.4	1.0	14.8
Mark Aguirre	SF	80	80	2,663	427	254	84	30	2,056	33.3	5.3	3.2	1.1	.4	25.7
Derek Harper	PG	77	76	2,556	199	609	167	25	1,230	33.2	2.6	7.9	2.2	.3	16.0
Roy Tarpley	PF	75	1	1,405	533	52	56	79	561	18.7	7.1	.7	.7	1.1	7.5
Bill Wennington	C	58	0	560	129	24	13	10	157	9.7	2.2	.4	.2	.2	2.7
Al Wood	SG	54	0	657	94	34	19	11	358	12.2	1.7	.6	.4	.2	6.6
Uwe Blab	C	30	0	160	36	13	4	9	53	5.3	1.2	.4	.1	.3	1.8
Dennis Nutt	PG	25	0	91	8	16	7	0	57	3.6	.3	.6	.3	.0	2.3
Myron Jackson	PG	8	0	22	3	6	1	0	11	2.8	.4	.8	.1	.0	1.4

=== Playoffs ===
Player	POS	GP	GS	MP	REB	AST	STL	BLK	PTS	MPG	RPG	APG	SPG	BPG	PPG
Rolando Blackman	SG	4	4	153	14	17	2	0	94	38.3	3.5	4.3	.5	.0	23.5
Sam Perkins	PF	4	4	133	34	5	4	1	68	33.3	8.5	1.3	1.0	.3	17.0
Mark Aguirre	SF	4	4	130	24	8	8	0	85	32.5	6.0	2.0	2.0	.0	21.3
Derek Harper	PG	4	4	123	12	27	7	0	66	30.8	3.0	6.8	1.8	.0	16.5
Roy Tarpley	PF	4	1	114	42	1	1	7	53	28.5	10.5	.3	.3	1.8	13.3
Detlef Schrempf	SF	4	0	97	12	6	3	2	31	24.3	3.0	1.5	.8	.5	7.8
Brad Davis	PG	4	0	75	9	17	0	0	33	18.8	2.3	4.3	.0	.0	8.3
Bill Wennington	C	4	0	47	10	4	0	3	15	11.8	2.5	1.0	.0	.8	3.8
James Donaldson	C	3	3	68	17	2	1	3	16	22.7	5.7	.7	.3	1.0	5.3
Uwe Blab	C	1	0	10	3	0	1	1	3	10.0	3.0	.0	1.0	1.0	3.0
Dennis Nutt	PG	1	0	10	2	1	0	0	2	10.0	2.0	1.0	.0	.0	2.0

== Awards and records ==
- Derek Harper, NBA All-Defensive Second Team
- Roy Tarpley, NBA All-Rookie Team 1st Team
- Rolando Blackman, NBA All-Star Game
- Mark Aguirre, NBA All-Star Game

== See also ==
- 1986–87 NBA season
