= 1986–87 Los Angeles Clippers season =

NBA professional basketball team season

- Head coach: Don Chaney
- General manager: Elgin Baylor
- Owner: Donald Sterling
- Arena: Los Angeles Memorial Sports Arena

Results
- Record: 12–70 (.146)
- Place: Division: 6th (Pacific); Conference: 12th (Western)
- Playoff finish: Did not qualify
- Stats at Basketball Reference

Local media
- Television: KTLA (Dave Diles, Norm Nixon)
- Radio: KLAC (Ralph Lawler, Norm Nixon, Pete Arbogast)

The 1986–87 Los Angeles Clippers season was their 17th season in the NBA, their 3rd in Los Angeles. The Clippers finished 12–70 (.146), the worst winning percentage in team history.

== Draft picks ==
Round	Pick	Player	Position	Nationality	College
3	54	Dwayne Polee	G	United States	Pepperdine
4	78	John Brownlee	C	United States	Texas
5	100	Steffond Johnson	F	United States	San Diego State
6	124	Tim Kempton	F	United States	Notre Dame
7	146	Johnny Brown	G	United States	New Mexico

== Roster ==
1986–87 Los Angeles Clippers roster
Players

Pos.	No.	Player	Height	Weight	DOB	From
C	00	Benoit Benjamin	7 ft 0 in (2.13 m)	250 lb (113 kg)		Creighton
F/C	44	Michael Cage	6 ft 9 in (2.06 m)	235 lb (107 kg)		San Diego State
F	25	Earl Cureton	6 ft 9 in (2.06 m)	215 lb (98 kg)		Detroit Mercy
G	20	Quintin Dailey	6 ft 3 in (1.91 m)	180 lb (82 kg)		San Francisco
G	2	Larry Drew	6 ft 2 in (1.88 m)	190 lb (86 kg)		Missouri
G	54	Kenny Fields	6 ft 5 in (1.96 m)	240 lb (109 kg)		UCLA
G	4	Lancaster Gordon	6 ft 3 in (1.91 m)	195 lb (88 kg)		Louisville
F	8	Marques Johnson	6 ft 7 in (2.01 m)	224 lb (102 kg)		UCLA
F	31	Steffond Johnson	6 ft 8 in (2.03 m)	240 lb (109 kg)		San Diego State
F/C	41	Tim Kempton	6 ft 10 in (2.08 m)	245 lb (111 kg)		Notre Dame
G	10	Norm Nixon	6 ft 2 in (1.88 m)	170 lb (77 kg)		Duquesne
G	1	Darnell Valentine	6 ft 1 in (1.85 m)	183 lb (83 kg)		Kansas
F	22	Rory White	6 ft 8 in (2.03 m)	215 lb (98 kg)		South Alabama
G	42	Mike Woodson	6 ft 5 in (1.96 m)	198 lb (90 kg)		Indiana

Coaches
Head coach
- Don Chaney
Assistant(s)
- Don Casey

Legend
- (DP) Unsigned draft pick
- (FA) Free agent
- (S) Suspended
- Injured

== Regular season ==
=== Season standings ===
Pacific Division	W	L	PCT	GB	Home	Road	Div
y-Los Angeles Lakers	65	17	.793	–	37–4	28–13	24–6
x-Portland Trail Blazers	49	33	.598	16	34–7	15–26	17–13
x-Golden State Warriors	42	40	.512	23	25–16	17–24	17–13
x-Seattle SuperSonics	39	43	.476	26	25–16	14–27	15–15
Phoenix Suns	36	46	.439	29	26–15	10–31	14–16
Los Angeles Clippers	12	70	.146	53	9–32	3–38	3–27

#	Western Conference				
#	Team	W	L	PCT	GB
1	z-Los Angeles Lakers	65	17	.793	–
2	y-Dallas Mavericks	55	27	.671	10
3	x-Portland Trail Blazers	49	33	.598	16
4	x-Utah Jazz	44	38	.537	21
5	x-Golden State Warriors	42	40	.512	23
6	x-Houston Rockets	42	40	.512	23
7	x-Seattle SuperSonics	39	43	.476	26
8	x-Denver Nuggets	37	45	.451	28
9	Phoenix Suns	36	46	.439	29
10	Sacramento Kings	29	53	.354	36
11	San Antonio Spurs	28	54	.341	37
12	Los Angeles Clippers	12	70	.146	53

z - clinched division title
y - clinched division title
x - clinched playoff spot

== Transactions ==
The Clippers were involved in the following transactions during the 1986–87 season.

=== Trades ===
August 19, 1986
To Los Angeles Clippers

- Larry Drew, Mike Woodson, 1988 first-round draft pick and 1989 second round draft pick
To Sacramento Kings

- Derek Smith, Franklin Edwards and Junior Bridgeman
January 16, 1987
To Los Angeles Clippers

- 1987 first-round pick and 1989 second or third-round draft pick
To Houston Rockets

- Cedric Maxwell
January 29, 1987
To Los Angeles Clippers

- 1987 first and second-round draft picks
To Detroit Pistons

- Kurt Nimphius
February 11, 1987
To Los Angeles Clippers

- Earl Cureton
To Chicago Bulls

- 1989 conditional third-round draft pick
