= Billy Thompson (basketball) =

American basketball player (born 1963)

Personal information
- Born: December 1, 1963 (age 62) Camden, New Jersey, U.S.
- Listed height: 6 ft 7 in (2.01 m)
- Listed weight: 195 lb (88 kg)

Career information
- High school: Camden (Camden, New Jersey)
- College: Louisville (1982–1986)
- NBA draft: 1986: 1st round, 19th overall pick
- Drafted by: Atlanta Hawks
- Playing career: 1986–1998
- Position: Small forward
- Number: 55

Career history
- 1986–1988: Los Angeles Lakers
- 1988–1991: Miami Heat
- 1992: Golden State Warriors
- 1993–1994: Rapid City Thrillers
- 1994: San Miguel Beermen
- 1994: Fenerbahçe
- 1994–1997: Hapoel Jerusalem
- 1997–1998: Peñarol de Mar del Plata

Career highlights
- 2× NBA champion (1987, 1988); All-CBA Second Team (1994); NCAA champion (1986); 2× First-team All-Metro Conference (1985, 1986); McDonald's All-American (1982); First-team Parade All-American (1982); Third-team Parade All-American (1981)

Career NBA statistics
- Points: 2,566 (8.6 ppg)
- Rebounds: 1,615 (5.4 rpg)
- Stats at NBA.com
- Stats at Basketball Reference
Medals
Men's basketball
Representing United States
Summer Universiade
Silver medal – second place	1985 Kobe	National team

William Stansbury Thompson (born December 1, 1963) is an American former professional basketball player who played in the National Basketball Association (NBA) and other leagues. He spent a 5-year career with the Los Angeles Lakers and Miami Heat, and registered one minute of court time with the Golden State Warriors in late 1991.

== High school and college ==
Thompson played basketball at Camden High School in New Jersey, where he was a two-time high school All-American. During his time with the team, Camden took the group IV state championship in 1982. Thompson was considered the number one high school prospect in the land. He elected to play college basketball for Denny Crum at the University of Louisville. His team reached the semi-finals of the national championship his freshman year, where they lost to the University of Houston. In his junior year he led the Cardinals in scoring, rebounding and assists. His senior season the Cardinals won the 1986 NCAA national championship.

== NBA ==
In the 1986 NBA draft he was selected 19th overall by the Atlanta Hawks. In a draft-day trade he was sent to the Los Angeles Lakers. He was a reserve on the Lakers teams that won back-to-back NBA championships in 1986–87 and 1987–88. He is one of only five players to have won an NCAA championship and an NBA championship in back-to-back seasons, the other four being Bill Russell (University of San Francisco 1956, Boston Celtics 1957), Henry Bibby (UCLA 1972, New York Knicks 1973), Earvin Johnson (Michigan State 1979, Los Angeles Lakers 1980), and Christian Braun (Kansas 2022, Denver Nuggets 2023).

After an injury-riddled sophomore season with the Lakers, he was then left unprotected in the 1988 NBA expansion draft and was selected by the Miami Heat, where he was a starter for the Heat's inaugural game and averaged 10.8 points per game in Miami's expansion season. As a part-time starter in 1989–90, Thompson averaged 11 points per game. He also appeared in the 1990 NBA Slam Dunk Contest, where he finished seventh out of eight participants.

== CBA ==
Thompson played for the Rapid City Thrillers of the Continental Basketball Association (CBA) during the 1993–94 season. He was selected to the All-CBA Second Team.

== Play abroad ==
In 1994 Thompson went to play professional basketball in Turkey for Fenerbahçe. He then played in Israel for Hapoel Jerusalem from 1994 to 1997. Along with Israeli star Adi Gordon, Thompson led Hapoel to two State Cup titles for the first time in Israeli history, defeating Israeli and European powerhouse Maccabi Tel Aviv both times. Thompson is one of the most favored foreign basketball players ever to play in Israel.

== Personal life ==
Thompson is a born-again Christian and presently pastors Jesus People Proclaim International Church in Deerfield Beach, Florida with his wife, Cynthia. They have five children and seven grandchildren, as well as two great-grandchildren.

== Career statistics ==
Legend
GP	Games played	GS	Games started	MPG	Minutes per game
FG%	Field goal percentage	3P%	3-point field goal percentage	FT%	Free throw percentage
RPG	Rebounds per game	APG	Assists per game	SPG	Steals per game
BPG	Blocks per game	PPG	Points per game	**Bold**	Career high

=== NBA ===
==== Regular season ====
Year	Team	GP	GS	MPG	FG%	3P%	FT%	RPG	APG	SPG	BPG	PPG
1986–87†	L.A. Lakers	59	0	12.9	**.544**	.000	.649	2.9	1.0	.3	.5	5.6
1987–88	L.A. Lakers	9	0	4.2	.231	–	**.800**	1.0	.1	.1	.0	1.6
1988–89	Miami	**79**	**58**	**28.8**	.487	.000	.696	**7.2**	**2.2**	**.7**	**1.3**	10.8
1989–90	Miami	**79**	45	27.1	.516	**.500**	.622	7.0	2.1	**.7**	1.0	**11.0**
1990–91	Miami	73	46	20.3	.499	.000	.718	4.3	1.5	.4	.7	6.8
1991–92	Golden State	1	0	1.0	–	–	–	.0	.0	.0	.0	.0
Career		300	149	22.3	.505	.154	.674	5.4	1.7	.5	.9	8.6

==== Playoffs ====
Year	Team	GP	GS	MPG	FG%	3P%	FT%	RPG	APG	SPG	BPG	PPG
1987†	L.A. Lakers	3	0	9.0	.545	–	1.000	2.0	.7	1.3	.0	4.7
