= 1986–87 San Antonio Spurs season =

- Head coach: Bob Weiss
- General manager: Bob Bass
- Owner: Angelo Drossos
- Arena: HemisFair Arena

Results
- Record: 28–54 (.341)
- Place: Division: 6th (Midwest); Conference: 11th (Western)
- Playoff finish: Did not qualify
- Stats at Basketball Reference

The 1986–87 San Antonio Spurs season was the Spurs' 11th season in the NBA and 20th season as a franchise.

== Draft picks ==
Round	Pick	Player	Position	Nationality	College
1	10	Johnny Dawkins	PG	United States	Duke
2	33	Kevin Duckworth	C	United States	Eastern Illinois
3	48	Forrest McKenzie		United States	Loyola Marymount
4	79	Carlos Briggs		United States	Baylor
5	102	Earl Kelley		United States	Connecticut
6	125	Kevin Lewis		United States	Southern Methodist
7	148	Michael Anderson		United States	Texas-Pan American

== Roster ==
1986–87 San Antonio Spurs roster
Players

Pos.	No.	Player	Height	Weight	DOB	From
SF	6	Walter Berry	6 ft 8 in (2.03 m)	215 lb (98 kg)	1964-05-14	St. John's
C	43	Frank Brickowski	6 ft 9 in (2.06 m)	240 lb (109 kg)	1959-08-14	Penn State
PG	24	Johnny Dawkins	6 ft 2 in (1.88 m)	165 lb (75 kg)	1963-09-28	Duke
C	53	Artis Gilmore	7 ft 2 in (2.18 m)	240 lb (109 kg)	1949-09-21	Jacksonville
PF	10	Dave Greenwood	6 ft 9 in (2.06 m)	222 lb (101 kg)	1957-05-27	UCLA
SF	11	Anthony Jones	6 ft 6 in (1.98 m)	195 lb (88 kg)	1962-09-13	UNLV
PF	42	Larry Krystkowiak	6 ft 9 in (2.06 m)	220 lb (100 kg)	1964-09-23	Montana
SF	34	Mike Mitchell	6 ft 7 in (2.01 m)	215 lb (98 kg)	1956-01-01	Auburn
PG	00	Johnny Moore	6 ft 1 in (1.85 m)	175 lb (79 kg)	1958-03-03	Texas
PF	32	Ed Nealy	6 ft 7 in (2.01 m)	238 lb (108 kg)	1960-02-19	Kansas State
SG	21	Alvin Robertson	6 ft 3 in (1.91 m)	185 lb (84 kg)	1962-07-22	Arkansas
PG	20	Jon Sundvold	6 ft 2 in (1.88 m)	170 lb (77 kg)	1961-07-02	Missouri

Coaches
Head coach
- Bob Weiss
Assistant(s)
- Lee Rose

Legend
- (DP) Unsigned draft pick
- (FA) Free agent
- (S) Suspended
- Injured

Roster
Updated: March 12, 1987

== Regular season ==
=== Season standings ===
Midwest Division	W	L	PCT	GB	Home	Road	Div
y-Dallas Mavericks	55	27	.671	–	35–6	20–21	19–11
x-Utah Jazz	44	38	.537	11	31–10	13–28	19–11
x-Houston Rockets	42	40	.512	13	25–16	17–24	19–11
x-Denver Nuggets	37	45	.451	18	27–14	10–31	14–16
Sacramento Kings	29	53	.354	26	20–21	9–32	10–20
San Antonio Spurs	28	54	.341	27	21–20	7–34	9–21

#	Western Conference				
#	Team	W	L	PCT	GB
1	z-Los Angeles Lakers	65	17	.793	–
2	y-Dallas Mavericks	55	27	.671	10
3	x-Portland Trail Blazers	49	33	.598	16
4	x-Utah Jazz	44	38	.537	21
5	x-Golden State Warriors	42	40	.512	23
6	x-Houston Rockets	42	40	.512	23
7	x-Seattle SuperSonics	39	43	.476	26
8	x-Denver Nuggets	37	45	.451	28
9	Phoenix Suns	36	46	.439	29
10	Sacramento Kings	29	53	.354	36
11	San Antonio Spurs	28	54	.341	37
12	Los Angeles Clippers	12	70	.146	53

z - clinched division title
y - clinched division title
x - clinched playoff spot

== Player statistics ==
=== Regular season ===
Player	POS	GP	GS	MP	REB	AST	STL	BLK	PTS	MPG	RPG	APG	SPG	BPG	PPG
Artis Gilmore	C	82	74	2,405	579	150	39	95	934	29.3	7.1	1.8	.5	1.2	11.4
Alvin Robertson	SG	81	78	2,697	424	421	260	35	1,435	33.3	5.2	5.2	3.2	.4	17.7
Johnny Dawkins	PG	81	14	1,682	169	290	67	3	835	20.8	2.1	3.6	.8	.0	10.3
David Greenwood	PF	79	78	2,587	783	237	71	50	916	32.7	9.9	3.0	.9	.6	11.6
Jon Sundvold	PG	76	42	1,765	98	315	35	0	850	23.2	1.3	4.1	.5	.0	11.2
Larry Krystkowiak	PF	68	2	1,004	239	85	22	12	451	14.8	3.5	1.3	.3	.2	6.6
Ed Nealy	PF	60	7	980	284	83	40	11	223	16.3	4.7	1.4	.7	.2	3.7
Walter Berry^{†}	SF	56	45	1,567	302	104	36	40	988	28.0	5.4	1.9	.6	.7	17.6
Johnny Moore	PG	55	27	1,234	100	250	83	3	474	22.4	1.8	4.5	1.5	.1	8.6
Mychal Thompson^{†}	PF	49	6	1,210	276	87	31	41	605	24.7	5.6	1.8	.6	.8	12.3
Anthony Jones^{†}	SF	49	3	744	95	66	32	18	286	15.2	1.9	1.3	.7	.4	5.8
Mike Mitchell	SF	40	18	922	103	38	19	9	509	23.1	2.6	1.0	.5	.2	12.7
Tyrone Corbin^{†}	SF	31	15	732	119	80	38	3	275	23.6	3.8	2.6	1.2	.1	8.9
Kevin Duckworth^{†}	C	14	1	122	31	6	5	3	45	8.7	2.2	.4	.4	.2	3.2
Frank Brickowski^{†}	C	7	0	83	19	5	6	2	30	11.9	2.7	.7	.9	.3	4.3
Forrest McKenzie	SF	6	0	42	7	1	1	0	17	7.0	1.2	.2	.2	.0	2.8
Mike Brittain	C	6	0	29	4	2	1	0	9	4.8	.7	.3	.2	.0	1.5

- ^{†} Denotes player spent time with another team in the season. Stats reflect time with the Spurs only.

== Awards and records ==
- Alvin Robertson, NBA All-Defensive First Team

== See also ==
- 1986-87 NBA season
