= 1986–87 Houston Rockets season =

- Head coach: Bill Fitch
- General manager: Ray Patterson
- Owner: Charlie Thomas
- Arena: The Summit

Results
- Record: 42–40 (.512)
- Place: Division: 3rd (Midwest); Conference: 6th (Western)
- Playoff finish: Conference semifinals (lost to SuperSonics 2–4)
- Stats at Basketball Reference

Local media
- Television: KTXH; Home Sports Entertainment
- Radio: KTRH

The 1986–87 Houston Rockets season was the Rockets' 20th season in the NBA and 16th season in the city of Houston. The Rockets entered the season as runner-ups in the 1986 NBA Finals, having lost to the Boston Celtics in six games.

In the playoffs, the Rockets defeated the Portland Trail Blazers in four games in the First Round before losing to the Seattle SuperSonics in six games in the Semifinals.

== Draft picks ==
Round	Pick	Player	Position	Nationality	College/Club team
1	20	Buck Johnson		United States	Alabama
2	43	Dave Feitl		United States	UTEP
3	66	Anthony Bowie		United States	Oklahoma
4	89	Conner Henry		United States	UC Santa Barbara
5	112	Andre Banks		United States	Iowa
6	135	Robert Worthy		United States	Myers
7	158	Rick Olson		United States	Wisconsin

== Roster ==
Houston Rockets roster
Players

Pos.	No.	Player	Height	Weight	DOB	From
PF	40	Richard Anderson	6 ft 10 in (2.08 m)	240 lb (109 kg)		UC Santa Barbara
C	5	Dave Feitl	6 ft 11 in (2.11 m)	235 lb (107 kg)		UTEP
SG	20	Steve Harris	6 ft 5 in (1.96 m)	195 lb (88 kg)		Tulsa
SF	1	Buck Johnson	6 ft 7 in (2.01 m)	190 lb (86 kg)		Alabama
PG	30	Allen Leavell	6 ft 1 in (1.85 m)	170 lb (77 kg)		Oklahoma City
SF	18	Cedric Maxwell	6 ft 8 in (2.03 m)	205 lb (93 kg)		Charlotte
SF	22	Rodney McCray	6 ft 7 in (2.01 m)	220 lb (100 kg)		Louisville
PG	10	Dirk Minniefield	6 ft 3 in (1.91 m)	180 lb (82 kg)		Kentucky
C	34	Akeem Olajuwon	7 ft 0 in (2.13 m)	255 lb (116 kg)		Houston
PF	43	Jim Petersen	6 ft 10 in (2.08 m)	235 lb (107 kg)		Minnesota
SG	33	Robert Reid	6 ft 8 in (2.03 m)	205 lb (93 kg)		Saint Mary's
PF	50	Ralph Sampson	7 ft 4 in (2.24 m)	228 lb (103 kg)		Virginia

Coaches
Head coach
- Bill Fitch
Assistant(s)
- Carroll Dawson
- Rudy Tomjanovich

Legend
- (DP) Unsigned draft pick
- (FA) Free agent
- (S) Suspended
- Injured

== Regular season ==
=== Season standings ===
Midwest Division	W	L	PCT	GB	Home	Road	Div
y-Dallas Mavericks	55	27	.671	–	35–6	20–21	19–11
x-Utah Jazz	44	38	.537	11	31–10	13–28	19–11
x-Houston Rockets	42	40	.512	13	25–16	17–24	19–11
x-Denver Nuggets	37	45	.451	18	27–14	10–31	14–16
Sacramento Kings	29	53	.354	26	20–21	9–32	10–20
San Antonio Spurs	28	54	.341	27	21–20	7–34	9–21

#	Western Conference				
#	Team	W	L	PCT	GB
1	z-Los Angeles Lakers	65	17	.793	–
2	y-Dallas Mavericks	55	27	.671	10
3	x-Portland Trail Blazers	49	33	.598	16
4	x-Utah Jazz	44	38	.537	21
5	x-Golden State Warriors	42	40	.512	23
6	x-Houston Rockets	42	40	.512	23
7	x-Seattle SuperSonics	39	43	.476	26
8	x-Denver Nuggets	37	45	.451	28
9	Phoenix Suns	36	46	.439	29
10	Sacramento Kings	29	53	.354	36
11	San Antonio Spurs	28	54	.341	37
12	Los Angeles Clippers	12	70	.146	53

z – clinched division title
y – clinched division title
x – clinched playoff spot

== Game log ==
=== Regular season ===
1986–87 game log
Total: 42–40 (home: 25–16; road: 17–24)
November: 7–7 (home: 5–3; road: 2–4)

Game	Date	Team	Score	High points	High rebounds	High assists	Location Attendance	Record
1	November 1, 1986	L.A. Lakers	W 112–102				The Summit	1–0
6	November 12, 1986	@ Dallas						
8	November 18, 1986	Portland						
9	November 20, 1986	Utah						
10	November 21, 1986	@ Washington						
11	November 23, 1986	@ Philadelphia						
13	November 26, 1986	@ Indiana						

December: 4–9 (home: 2–5; road: 2–4)

Game	Date	Team	Score	High points	High rebounds	High assists	Location Attendance	Record
15	December 2, 1986	@ Golden State	L 99–104				Oakland-Alameda County Coliseum Arena	7–8
16	December 4, 1986	Atlanta	L 93–109				The Summit	7–9
17	December 6, 1986	Seattle	L 80–136				The Summit	7–10
19	December 11, 1986	Golden State	L 104–111				The Summit	8–11
22	December 18, 1986	@ Seattle	L 100–114				Seattle Center Coliseum	9–13
23	December 19, 1986	@ Portland						
24	December 21, 1986	L.A. Lakers	L 96–103				The Summit	9–15
26	December 26, 1986	@ L.A. Lakers	L 111–134				The Forum	10–16
27	December 27, 1986	@ Utah						

January: 11–4 (home: 6–2; road: 5–2)

Game	Date	Team	Score	High points	High rebounds	High assists	Location Attendance	Record
29	January 2, 1987	@ Denver						
30	January 3, 1987	Seattle	W 138–114				The Summit	13–17
31	January 6, 1987	@ Golden State	L 100–118				Oakland-Alameda County Coliseum Arena	13–18
32	January 8, 1987	Indiana						
33	January 10, 1987	Dallas						
35	January 15, 1987	@ Chicago						
36	January 16, 1987	@ Detroit	W 112–106				Pontiac Silverdome	18–18
37	January 18, 1987	@ Boston	L 99–122				Boston Garden	18–19
41	January 24, 1987	Washington						
42	January 27, 1987	Utah						
43	January 29, 1987	Milwaukee	L 93–99				The Summit	22–21

February: 8–4 (home: 5–2; road: 3–2)

Game	Date	Team	Score	High points	High rebounds	High assists	Location Attendance	Record
44	February 1, 1987	@ Atlanta	W 106–104				The Omni	23–21
45	February 3, 1987	Denver						
46	February 5, 1987	Golden State	W 120–110				The Summit	24–22
All-Star Break
49	February 14, 1987	@ Milwaukee	L 101–116				MECCA Arena	26–23
50	February 16, 1987	Dallas						
51	February 19, 1987	Boston	L 92–99				The Summit	27–24
52	February 21, 1987	Utah						
53	February 23, 1987	Denver						
54	February 24, 1987	@ Denver						
55	February 26, 1987	@ Utah						

March: 7–10 (home: 4–3; road: 3–7)

Game	Date	Team	Score	High points	High rebounds	High assists	Location Attendance	Record
56	March 1, 1987	Philadelphia						
59	March 5, 1987	@ Golden State	L 96–105				Oakland-Alameda County Coliseum Arena	32–27
60	March 7, 1987	@ Seattle	L 115–118				Seattle Center Coliseum	32–28
61	March 8, 1987	@ Portland						
62	March 10, 1987	Seattle	L 127–136 (2OT)				The Summit	32–30
64	March 14, 1987	@ Dallas						
65	March 16, 1987	Chicago						
68	March 21, 1987	@ Utah						
69	March 23, 1987	Detroit	L 110–114				The Summit	36–33
71	March 26, 1987	Portland						
72	March 28, 1987	L.A. Lakers	L 109–123				The Summit	37–35
73	March 31, 1987	@ L.A. Lakers	L 96–111				The Forum	37–36

April: 5–4 (home: 3–0; road: 2–4)

Game	Date	Team	Score	High points	High rebounds	High assists	Location Attendance	Record
76	April 6, 1987	@ Portland						
79	April 11, 1987	Denver						
80	April 15, 1987	@ Dallas						
81	April 17, 1987	Dallas						
82	April 18, 1987	@ Denver						

1986–87 schedule

== Playoffs ==
1987 playoff game log
First Round: 3–1 (home: 1–1; road: 2–0)

Game	Date	Team	Score	High points	High rebounds	High assists	Location Attendance	Series
1	April 24, 1987	@ Portland	W 125–115	Olajuwon (30)	Olajuwon (10)	Leavell (10)	Memorial Coliseum; 12,666	1–0
2	April 26, 1987	@ Portland	L 98–111	Leavell, Sampson (28)	McCray (12)	Leavell (8)	Memorial Coliseum; 12,666	1–1
3	April 28, 1987	Portland	W 117–108	Olajuwon (35)	Olajuwon (11)	Leavell (13)	The Summit; 16,279	2–1
4	April 30, 1987	Portland	W 113–101	Olajuwon (27)	McCray, Sampson (10)	Leavell (8)	The Summit; 16,279	3–1

Conference semifinals: 2–4 (home: 1–2; road: 1–2)

Game	Date	Team	Score	High points	High rebounds	High assists	Location Attendance	Series
1	May 2, 1987	Seattle	L 106–111 (OT)	Olajuwon (28)	Olajuwon (16)	McCray (8)	The Summit; 16,279	0–1
2	May 5, 1987	Seattle	L 97–99	Olajuwon (27)	Olajuwon, Sampson (13)	Leavell, McCray (8)	The Summit; 16,279	0–2
3	May 7, 1987	@ Seattle	W 102–84	Olajuwon (33)	Olajuwon (11)	Reid (9)	Seattle Center Coliseum; 14,587	1–2
4	May 9, 1987	@ Seattle	L 102–117	McCray, Olajuwon (20)	McCray (12)	Leavell (5)	Seattle Center Coliseum; 14,559	1–3
5	May 12, 1987	Seattle	W 112–107	Olajuwon (26)	McCray (10)	McCray (11)	The Summit; 16,279	2–3
6	May 14, 1987	@ Seattle	L 125–128 (2OT)	Olajuwon (49)	Olajuwon (25)	Reid (12)	Seattle Center Coliseum; 14,751	2–4

1987 schedule

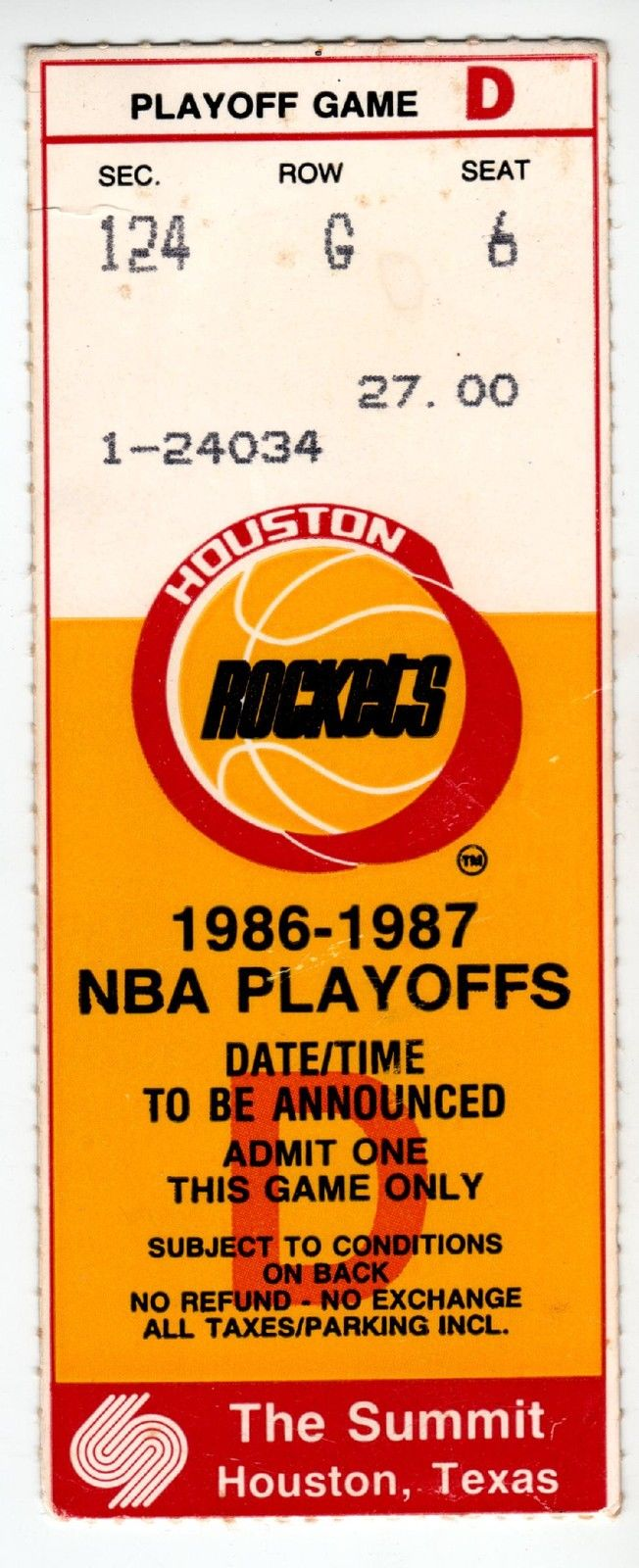
A ticket for Game 2 of the 1987 Western Conference semifinals between the Rockets and the Seattle SuperSonics.

== Player statistics ==
Legend
GP	Games played	GS	Games started	MPG	Minutes per game
FG%	Field-goal percentage	3P%	3-point field-goal percentage	FT%	Free-throw percentage
RPG	Rebounds per game	APG	Assists per game	SPG	Steals per game
BPG	Blocks per game	PPG	Points per game

=== Season ===
Player	GP	GS	MPG	FG%	3FG%	FT%	RPG	APG	SPG	BPG	PPG

=== Playoffs ===
Player	GP	GS	MPG	FG%	3FG%	FT%	RPG	APG	SPG	BPG	PPG

== Awards and records ==
- Akeem Olajuwon, All-NBA First Team
- Akeem Olajuwon, NBA All-Defensive First Team
- Rodney McCray, NBA All-Defensive Second Team
