= 1986–87 Phoenix Suns season =

NBA team season

- Head coach: John MacLeod (22–34); Dick Van Arsdale (14–12)
- General manager: Jerry Colangelo
- Owners: Karl Eller, Don Pitt, Don Diamond, Bhavik Darji, Marvin Meyer, Richard L. Bloch
- Arena: Arizona Veterans Memorial Coliseum

Results
- Record: 36–46 (.439)
- Place: Division: 5th (Pacific); Conference: 9th (Western)
- Playoff finish: Did not qualify
- Stats at Basketball Reference

Local media
- Television: KNXV-TV
- Radio: KTAR

The 1986–87 Phoenix Suns season was the 18th season for the Phoenix Suns of the National Basketball Association and their final season under the original ownership group led by Karl Eller, Donald Pitt, Don Diamond, Bhavik Darji, Marvin Meyer, and Richard L. Bloch. The Suns started their fourteenth season under head coach John MacLeod. At 22–34 (.393) in late February, management decided to replace the longstanding MacLeod with Dick Van Arsdale, a former Suns player from the 1975–76 Finals team (coached by MacLeod), who was working as the team's color commentator for TV and radio at the time, despite having no prior coaching experience.

Phoenix went 14–12 (.538) in those last 26 games under Van Arsdale to finish at 36–46 (.439), and missed the 16-team playoffs by one game. All of the Suns' home games were played at Arizona Veterans Memorial Coliseum.

Walter Davis again led the Suns in scoring, averaging 23.6 points for the season. The Suns had another 20-point scorer in Larry Nance, who garnered a career-high 22.5 points and a team-high 8.7 rebounds a game. Third-year point guard Jay Humphries averaged 7.7 assists per game to go with 11.3 points per game. For the 32-year-old Davis, it was an All-Star season for him, his 6th in 10 seasons with the Suns, and would be the last time of his career he was honored as an All-Star.

This season was notably infamous for being the key point where the Phoenix Suns organization was hit with a drug scandal that stayed behind the scenes until around the end of this season. On April 17, 1987, one day before the Suns would play their final game of the regular season against the Los Angeles Clippers, Maricopa County law enforcement officials revealed that five present at the time or former Suns players were indicted on drug-related charges, with six more present at the time or former Suns players being linked to the case by that time. Despite the indictments, Jay Humphries and Grant Gondrezick were both allowed to play in the final game of the season while All-Star Walter Davis and rookie William Bedford were not allowed to do so despite their immunity from the case. The scandal would also involve a gambling case regarding a February 21, 1987 game between the Suns and the Milwaukee Bucks where at a nightclub called Malarkey's, James Edwards and two Bucks players named Jack Sikma and Paul Mokeski (according to Malarkey's manager James Jordan) allegedly claimed that the game between them would not exceed a total of 226 points scored (which was correct since it favored the Bucks 115–107 that night). While the scandal would eventually end with no major punishments being involved for any of the players that were named in the case outside of Gondrezick serving three years of probation for tampering with a witness, it would lead to a very hectic and uncertain offseason period for the Suns as they entered the upcoming season following this one.

== Offseason ==
=== NBA draft ===
Round	Pick	Player	Position	Nationality	College
1	6	William Bedford	Center	United States	Memphis State
2	31	Joe Ward	Guard	United States	Georgia
2	39	Rafael Addison	Forward	United States	Syracuse
2	46	Jeff Hornacek	Guard	United States	Iowa State
3	55	Kenny Gattison	Forward	United States	Old Dominion
4	77	Grant Gondrezick	Guard	United States	Pepperdine
5	101	Greg Spurling	Center	United States	Carson–Newman
6	123	Jim McCaffrey	Guard	United States	Holy Cross
7	147	Damon Goodwin	Guard	United States	Dayton

== Roster ==
1986–87 Phoenix Suns roster
Players

Pos.	No.	Player	Height	Weight	DOB	From
C	33	Alvan Adams	6 ft 9 in (2.06 m)	210 lb (95 kg)	1954-07-19	Oklahoma
F	12	Rafael Addison	6 ft 7 in (2.01 m)	215 lb (98 kg)	1964-07-22	Syracuse
C	50	William Bedford (injured)	7 ft 0 in (2.13 m)	225 lb (102 kg)	1963-12-14	Memphis
G	6	Walter Davis	6 ft 6 in (1.98 m)	193 lb (88 kg)	1954-09-09	North Carolina
C	53	James Edwards (injured)	7 ft 0 in (2.13 m)	225 lb (102 kg)	1955-11-22	Washington
F	44	Kenny Gattison	6 ft 8 in (2.03 m)	225 lb (102 kg)	1964-05-23	Old Dominion
G	3	Grant Gondrezick	6 ft 5 in (1.96 m)	205 lb (93 kg)	1963-01-19	Pepperdine
G	14	Jeff Hornacek	6 ft 3 in (1.91 m)	190 lb (86 kg)	1963-05-03	Iowa State
G	24	Jay Humphries	6 ft 3 in (1.91 m)	185 lb (84 kg)	1962-10-17	Colorado
F	22	Larry Nance	6 ft 10 in (2.08 m)	205 lb (93 kg)	1959-02-12	Clemson
F	54	Ed Pinckney	6 ft 9 in (2.06 m)	195 lb (88 kg)	1963-03-27	Villanova
G/F	11	Mike Sanders	6 ft 6 in (1.98 m)	210 lb (95 kg)	1960-05-07	UCLA
G/F	7	Bernard Thompson	6 ft 6 in (1.98 m)	210 lb (95 kg)	1962-08-30	Fresno State
C	30	Nick Vanos	7 ft 1 in (2.16 m)	255 lb (116 kg)	1963-04-13	Santa Clara

Coaches
Head coach
- Dick Van Arsdale (Indiana)
Assistant(s)
- John Wetzel (Virginia Tech)

Legend
- (DP) Unsigned draft pick
- (FA) Free agent
- (S) Suspended
- Injured

== Regular season ==
=== Standings ===
Pacific Division	W	L	PCT	GB	Home	Road	Div
y-Los Angeles Lakers	65	17	.793	–	37–4	28–13	24–6
x-Portland Trail Blazers	49	33	.598	16	34–7	15–26	17–13
x-Golden State Warriors	42	40	.512	23	25–16	17–24	17–13
x-Seattle SuperSonics	39	43	.476	26	25–16	14–27	15–15
Phoenix Suns	36	46	.439	29	26–15	10–31	14–16
Los Angeles Clippers	12	70	.146	53	9–32	3–38	3–27

#	Western Conference				
#	Team	W	L	PCT	GB
1	z-Los Angeles Lakers	65	17	.793	–
2	y-Dallas Mavericks	55	27	.671	10
3	x-Portland Trail Blazers	49	33	.598	16
4	x-Utah Jazz	44	38	.537	21
5	x-Golden State Warriors	42	40	.512	23
6	x-Houston Rockets	42	40	.512	23
7	x-Seattle SuperSonics	39	43	.476	26
8	x-Denver Nuggets	37	45	.451	28
9	Phoenix Suns	36	46	.439	29
10	Sacramento Kings	29	53	.354	36
11	San Antonio Spurs	28	54	.341	37
12	Los Angeles Clippers	12	70	.146	53

== Awards and honors ==
=== All-Star ===
- Walter Davis was selected as a reserve for the Western Conference in the All-Star Game. It was his sixth and final All-Star selection.
- The only other Suns player to receive All-Star votes this season was Larry Nance (314,193).

== Player statistics ==
Legend
GP	Games played	GS	Games started	MPG	Minutes per game
FG%	Field-goal percentage	3P%	3-point field-goal percentage	FT%	Free-throw percentage
RPG	Rebounds per game	APG	Assists per game	SPG	Steals per game
BPG	Blocks per game	PPG	Points per game

=== Season ===
Phoenix Suns statistics
Player	GP	GS	MPG	FG%	3P%	FT%	RPG	APG	SPG	BPG	PPG
Alvan Adams	68	40	24.9	.503	.000	.788	5.0	3.3	.9	.5	11.1
Rafael Addison	62	12	11.5	.441	.320	.797	1.7	0.7	.4	.1	5.8
William Bedford	50	18	19.6	.397	.000	.581	4.9	1.1	.4	.7	6.7
Walter Davis	79	79	33.5	.514	.259	.862	3.1	4.6	1.2	.1	23.6
James Edwards	14	9	21.7	.518	.	.771	4.3	1.4	.4	.5	12.0
Kenny Gattison	77	14	14.3	.476	.000	.632	3.5	0.5	.3	.4	5.2
Grant Gondrezick	64	1	13.1	.450	.235	.701	1.7	1.3	.4	.1	5.5
Jeff Hornacek	80	3	19.5	.454	.279	.777	2.3	4.5	.9	.1	5.3
Jay Humphries	82	82	31.5	.477	.185	.769	3.2	7.7	1.4	.1	11.3
Larry Nance	69	67	37.2	.551	.200	.773	8.7	3.4	1.2	2.1	22.5
Ed Pinckney	80	65	28.1	.584	.000	.739	7.3	1.5	1.1	.7	10.5
Mike Sanders	82	4	20.2	.494	.118	.781	3.3	1.5	.7	.3	10.5
Bernard Thompson	24	2	13.8	.400	.000	.818	1.3	0.8	.5	.2	4.6
Nick Vanos	57	14	11.2	.411	.000	.644	3.2	0.8	.3	.4	2.9

== Transactions ==
=== Free agents ===
==== Additions ====
Date	Player	Contract	Old Team
October 1, 1986	Walter Davis	Re-signed to 3-year contract	Phoenix Suns

==== Subtractions ====
Date	Player	Reason left	New team
June 8, 1986	Rod Foster	Waived	—N/a (Retired)
July 31, 1986	Rick Robey	Free agent	—N/a (Retired)
August 13, 1986	Charles Pittman	Free agent	Pallacanestro Varese (Italy)
August 20, 1986	Georgi Glouchkov	Waived	Mobilgirgi Caserta (Italy)
October 23, 1986	Sedric Toney	Waived	New York Knicks
October 28, 1986	Charles Jones	Waived	Portland Trail Blazers
