= 1986–87 Portland Trail Blazers season =

NBA professional basketball team season

- Head coach: Mike Schuler
- General manager: Jon Spoelstra
- Owner: Larry Weinberg
- Arena: Memorial Coliseum

Results
- Record: 49–33 (.598)
- Place: Division: 2nd (Pacific); Conference: 3rd (Western)
- Playoff finish: First round (lost to Rockets 1–3)
- Stats at Basketball Reference

The 1986–87 Portland Trail Blazers season was the 17th season of the Portland Trail Blazers in the National Basketball Association (NBA). The Blazers finished 49–33, third in the Western Conference, qualifying for the playoffs for the fifth consecutive year.

In the 1987 NBA Playoffs, despite having home-court advantage, the Blazers lost their first-round best-of-five series to the Houston Rockets, three games to one.

== Draft picks ==
Note: This is not a complete list; only the first two rounds are covered, as well as notable post-second round picks.

Round	Pick	Player	Position	Nationality	School/Club team
1	14	Walter Berry	F	United States	St. John's
1	24	Arvydas Sabonis	C	Soviet Union (Lithuania)	Zalgiris (Lithuania)
2	37	Panagiotis Fasoulas	C	Greece	NC State
3	60	Dražen Petrović	G	Yugoslavia	Cibona Zagreb (Yugoslavia)

== Roster ==
1986–87 Portland Trail Blazers roster
Players

Pos.	No.	Player	Height	Weight	DOB	From
C	31	Sam Bowie	7 ft 1 in (2.16 m)	235 lb (107 kg)	1961-03-17	Kentucky
F	34	Kenny Carr	6 ft 7 in (2.01 m)	220 lb (100 kg)	1955-08-15	NC State
G	22	Clyde Drexler	6 ft 7 in (2.01 m)	210 lb (95 kg)	1962-06-22	Houston
C	00	Kevin Duckworth	7 ft 0 in (2.13 m)	275 lb (125 kg)	1964-04-01	Eastern Illinois
G	6	Mike Holton	6 ft 4 in (1.93 m)	185 lb (84 kg)	1961-08-04	UCLA
C	33	Steve Johnson	6 ft 10 in (2.08 m)	235 lb (107 kg)	1957-11-03	Oregon State
F	27	Caldwell Jones	6 ft 11 in (2.11 m)	217 lb (98 kg)	1950-08-04	Albany State
F	25	Jerome Kersey	6 ft 7 in (2.01 m)	215 lb (98 kg)	1962-06-26	Longwood
C	10	Fernando Martín	6 ft 9 in (2.06 m)	220 lb (100 kg)	1962-03-25	Spain
G	4	Jim Paxson	6 ft 6 in (1.98 m)	200 lb (91 kg)	1957-07-09	Dayton
G	30	Terry Porter	6 ft 3 in (1.91 m)	195 lb (88 kg)	1963-04-08	UW–Stevens Point
G	11	Ron Rowan	6 ft 5 in (1.96 m)	200 lb (91 kg)	1962-04-23	St. John's
F	55	Kiki Vandeweghe	6 ft 8 in (2.03 m)	220 lb (100 kg)	1958-08-01	UCLA

Coaches
Head coach
- Mike Schuler
Assistant(s)
- Rick Adelman

Legend
- (DP) Unsigned draft pick
- (FA) Free agent
- (S) Suspended
- Injured

Roster
Updated: April 20, 1987

== Regular season ==
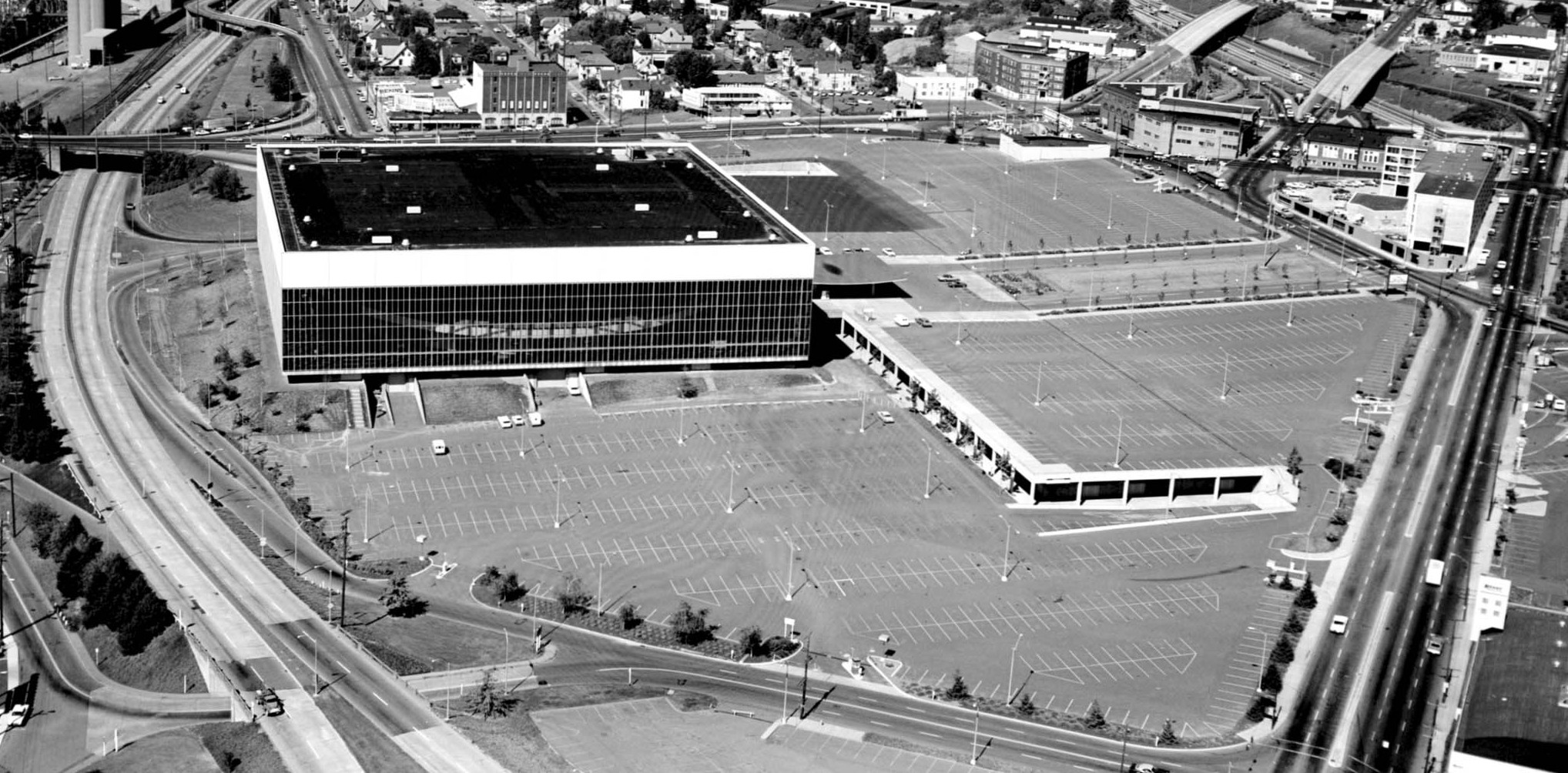
The Trail Blazers played their home games at Veterans Memorial Coliseum.

=== Season standings ===
Pacific Division	W	L	PCT	GB	Home	Road	Div
y-Los Angeles Lakers	65	17	.793	–	37–4	28–13	24–6
x-Portland Trail Blazers	49	33	.598	16	34–7	15–26	17–13
x-Golden State Warriors	42	40	.512	23	25–16	17–24	17–13
x-Seattle SuperSonics	39	43	.476	26	25–16	14–27	15–15
Phoenix Suns	36	46	.439	29	26–15	10–31	14–16
Los Angeles Clippers	12	70	.146	53	9–32	3–38	3–27

#	Western Conference				
#	Team	W	L	PCT	GB
1	z-Los Angeles Lakers	65	17	.793	–
2	y-Dallas Mavericks	55	27	.671	10
3	x-Portland Trail Blazers	49	33	.598	16
4	x-Utah Jazz	44	38	.537	21
5	x-Golden State Warriors	42	40	.512	23
6	x-Houston Rockets	42	40	.512	23
7	x-Seattle SuperSonics	39	43	.476	26
8	x-Denver Nuggets	37	45	.451	28
9	Phoenix Suns	36	46	.439	29
10	Sacramento Kings	29	53	.354	36
11	San Antonio Spurs	28	54	.341	37
12	Los Angeles Clippers	12	70	.146	53

z – clinched division title
y – clinched division title
x – clinched playoff spot

== Playoffs ==
1987 playoff game log
First round: 1–3 (home: 1–1; road: 0–2)

Game	Date	Team	Score	High points	High rebounds	High assists	Location Attendance	Series
1	April 24	Houston	L 115–125	Kiki VanDeWeghe (30)	Clyde Drexler (13)	Terry Porter (11)	Memorial Coliseum; 12,666	0–1
2	April 26	Houston	W 111–98	Clyde Drexler (32)	Porter, Johnson (8)	Terry Porter (15)	Memorial Coliseum; 12,666	1–1
3	April 28	@ Houston	L 108–117	Clyde Drexler (26)	Johnson, Jones (10)	Terry Porter (8)	The Summit; 16,279	1–2
4	April 30	@ Houston	L 101–113	Kiki VanDeWeghe (27)	Steve Johnson (12)	Terry Porter (6)	The Summit; 16,279	1–3

1987 schedule

== Player statistics ==
Legend
GP	Games played	GS	Games started	MPG	Minutes per game
FG%	Field-goal percentage	3P%	3-point field-goal percentage	FT%	Free-throw percentage
RPG	Rebounds per game	APG	Assists per game	SPG	Steals per game
BPG	Blocks per game	PPG	Points per game

=== Season ===
Player	GP	GS	MPG	FG%	3FG%	FT%	RPG	APG	SPG	BPG	PPG

=== Playoffs ===
Player	GP	GS	MPG	FG%	3FG%	FT%	RPG	APG	SPG	BPG	PPG

== Awards and honors ==
- Mike Schuler, NBA Coach of the Year
