= 1986–87 Denver Nuggets season =

NBA professional basketball team season

- Head coach: Doug Moe
- Arena: McNichols Sports Arena

Results
- Record: 37–45 (.451)
- Place: Division: 4th (Midwest); Conference: 8th (Western)
- Playoff finish: West First Round (lost to Lakers 0–3)
- Stats at Basketball Reference

The 1986–87 Denver Nuggets season was the Nuggets' 11th season in the NBA and 20th season as a franchise.

In the playoffs, the Nuggets were swept by the eventual NBA champion Los Angeles Lakers in three games in the First Round. They also dubiously dropped the season series to the lowly Los Angeles Clippers, who had one of the all-time NBA worst seasons finishing at 12–70.

== Draft picks ==
Round	Pick	Player	Position	Nationality	School/Club team
1	16	Maurice Martin	SF/SG	United States	St. Joseph's
1	18	Mark Alarie	PF	United States	Duke
3	64	Don Redden	G/F	United States	Louisiana State
4	87	Anthony Watson	G	United States	San Diego State
5	110	Jon Collins	SG	United States	Eastern Illinois
6	133	Anthony Frederick	SF	United States	Pepperdine
7	156	Mike Marshall		United States	McNeese State

== Roster ==
Denver Nuggets roster
Players

Pos.	No.	Player	Height	Weight	DOB	From
PF	32	Mark Alarie	6 ft 8 in (2.03 m)	217 lb (98 kg)		Duke
C	42	Wayne Cooper	6 ft 10 in (2.08 m)	220 lb (100 kg)		New Orleans
SG	23	T.R. Dunn	6 ft 4 in (1.93 m)	190 lb (86 kg)		Alabama
SF	2	Alex English	6 ft 7 in (2.01 m)	190 lb (86 kg)		South Carolina
SG	5	Mike Evans	6 ft 1 in (1.85 m)	170 lb (77 kg)		Kansas State
PF	24	Bill Hanzlik	6 ft 7 in (2.01 m)	185 lb (84 kg)		Notre Dame
PG	12	Fat Lever	6 ft 3 in (1.91 m)	170 lb (77 kg)		Arizona State
SF	11	Maurice Martin	6 ft 6 in (1.98 m)	200 lb (91 kg)		Saint Joseph's
PF	33	Calvin Natt	6 ft 6 in (1.98 m)	220 lb (100 kg)		Louisiana–Monroe
C	41	Blair Rasmussen	7 ft 0 in (2.13 m)	250 lb (113 kg)		Oregon
C	34	Danny Schayes	6 ft 11 in (2.11 m)	235 lb (107 kg)		Syracuse
SG	22	Otis Smith	6 ft 5 in (1.96 m)	210 lb (95 kg)		Jacksonville
PG	4	Darrell Walker	6 ft 4 in (1.93 m)	180 lb (82 kg)		Arkansas

Coaches
Head coach
- Doug Moe
Assistant(s)
- Allan Bristow

Legend
- (DP) Unsigned draft pick
- (FA) Free agent
- (S) Suspended
- Injured

== Regular season ==
=== Season standings ===
Midwest Division	W	L	PCT	GB	Home	Road	Div
y-Dallas Mavericks	55	27	.671	–	35–6	20–21	19–11
x-Utah Jazz	44	38	.537	11	31–10	13–28	19–11
x-Houston Rockets	42	40	.512	13	25–16	17–24	19–11
x-Denver Nuggets	37	45	.451	18	27–14	10–31	14–16
Sacramento Kings	29	53	.354	26	20–21	9–32	10–20
San Antonio Spurs	28	54	.341	27	21–20	7–34	9–21

#	Western Conference				
#	Team	W	L	PCT	GB
1	z-Los Angeles Lakers	65	17	.793	–
2	y-Dallas Mavericks	55	27	.671	10
3	x-Portland Trail Blazers	49	33	.598	16
4	x-Utah Jazz	44	38	.537	21
5	x-Golden State Warriors	42	40	.512	23
6	x-Houston Rockets	42	40	.512	23
7	x-Seattle SuperSonics	39	43	.476	26
8	x-Denver Nuggets	37	45	.451	28
9	Phoenix Suns	36	46	.439	29
10	Sacramento Kings	29	53	.354	36
11	San Antonio Spurs	28	54	.341	37
12	Los Angeles Clippers	12	70	.146	53

z - clinched division title
y - clinched division title
x - clinched playoff spot

== Playoffs ==
1987 playoff game log
First round: 0–3 (home: 0–1; road: 0–2)

Game	Date	Team	Score	High points	High rebounds	High assists	Location Attendance	Series
1	April 23	@ L.A. Lakers	L 95–128	Blair Rasmussen (26)	Blair Rasmussen (13)	Fat Lever (9)	The Forum; 17,505	0–1
2	April 25	@ L.A. Lakers	L 127–139	Fat Lever (26)	Fat Lever (10)	Fat Lever (9)	The Forum; 17,297	0–2
3	April 29	L.A. Lakers	L 103–140	Alex English (25)	Wayne Cooper (12)	Alex English (6)	McNichols Sports Arena; 15,137	0–3

1987 schedule

== Player statistics ==
Legend
GP	Games played	GS	Games started	MPG	Minutes per game
FG%	Field-goal percentage	3P%	3-point field-goal percentage	FT%	Free-throw percentage
RPG	Rebounds per game	APG	Assists per game	SPG	Steals per game
BPG	Blocks per game	PPG	Points per game

=== Season ===
Player	GP	GS	MPG	FG%	3FG%	FT%	RPG	APG	SPG	BPG	PPG

=== Playoffs ===
Player	GP	GS	MPG	FG%	3FG%	FT%	RPG	APG	SPG	BPG	PPG

== Awards and records ==
- Lafayette Lever, All-NBA Second Team

== See also ==
- 1986-87 NBA season
