= Kevin Henderson (basketball) =

American basketball player (born 1964)

Personal information
- Born: March 22, 1964 (age 62) Baltimore, Maryland, U.S.
- Listed height: 6 ft 4 in (1.93 m)
- Listed weight: 195 lb (88 kg)

Career information
- High school: Centennial (Compton, California)
- College: Saddleback (1982–1983); Cal State Fullerton (1983–1986)
- NBA draft: 1986: 3rd round, 50th overall pick
- Drafted by: Cleveland Cavaliers
- Position: Point guard / shooting guard
- Number: 31, 25, 12

Career history
- 1987: Golden State Warriors
- 1988: Cleveland Cavaliers
- Stats at NBA.com
- Stats at Basketball Reference

Kevin Dwayne Henderson (born March 22, 1964) is a professional basketball player. He played college basketball for the Cal State Fullerton Titans and played for the Golden State Warriors and Cleveland Cavaliers in a two-season NBA career. In 22 games, he averaged 10.7 minutes and 3.0 points per game.

== Career statistics ==
Legend
GP	Games played	GS	Games started	MPG	Minutes per game
FG%	Field goal percentage	3P%	3-point field goal percentage	FT%	Free throw percentage
RPG	Rebounds per game	APG	Assists per game	SPG	Steals per game
BPG	Blocks per game	PPG	Points per game	**Bold**	Career high

=== NBA ===
==== Regular season ====
Year	Team	GP	GS	MPG	FG%	3P%	FT%	RPG	APG	SPG	BPG	PPG
1986–87	Golden State	5	0	9.0	.375	–	**1.000**	.6	**2.2**	.2	.0	1.6
1987–88	Golden State	**12**	**2**	**14.2**	.396	.000	.714	**1.4**	1.8	**.7**	.0	**4.0**
1987–88	Cleveland	5	0	4.0	**.400**	–	.417	.8	.4	.0	.0	1.8
Career		22	2	10.7	.393	.000	.607	1.1	1.5	.4	.0	3.0
