= 1986–87 Utah Jazz season =

NBA professional basketball team season

- Head coach: Frank Layden
- General manager: Frank Layden
- Owner: Larry H. Miller
- Arena: Salt Palace

Results
- Record: 44–38 (.537)
- Place: Division: 2nd (Midwest); Conference: 4th (Western)
- Playoff finish: First round (lost to Warriors 2–3)
- Stats at Basketball Reference

Local media
- Television: KSL-TV; Jazz Cable Network
- Radio: KSL

The 1986–87 Utah Jazz season was the team's 13th in the NBA. They began the season hoping to improve upon their 42–40 output from the previous season. They bested it by two wins, finishing 44–38 and qualified for the playoffs for the fourth straight season.

== Draft picks ==
Round	Pick	Player	Position	Nationality	College
1	15	Dell Curry	SG/SF	United States	Virginia Polytech
3	61	John Shasky	C	United States	Minnesota
3	63	Bill Breeding		United States	Rocky Mountain
4	84	Marty Embry		United States	DePaul
5	107	Kerry Boagni	PF	United States	California State-Fullerton
6	130	Chuck Everson		United States	Villanova
7	153	Mark Mitchell		United States	Hartford

== Roster ==
Utah Jazz roster
Players

Pos.	No.	Player	Height	Weight	DOB	From
F/C	41	Thurl Bailey	6 ft 11 in (2.11 m)	215 lb (98 kg)		NC State
C	54	Kent Benson	6 ft 10 in (2.08 m)	235 lb (107 kg)		Indiana
G	30	Dell Curry	6 ft 4 in (1.93 m)	190 lb (86 kg)		Virginia Tech
C	53	Mark Eaton	7 ft 4 in (2.24 m)	275 lb (125 kg)		UCLA
G	14	Rickey Green	6 ft 0 in (1.83 m)	170 lb (77 kg)		Michigan
G	35	Darrell Griffith	6 ft 4 in (1.93 m)	190 lb (86 kg)		Louisville
G	20	Bob Hansen	6 ft 6 in (1.98 m)	190 lb (86 kg)		Iowa
F	43	Marc Iavaroni	6 ft 8 in (2.03 m)	210 lb (95 kg)		Virginia
F	32	Karl Malone	6 ft 9 in (2.06 m)	250 lb (113 kg)		Louisiana Tech
F	22	Carey Scurry	6 ft 7 in (2.01 m)	188 lb (85 kg)		Long Island
G	12	John Stockton	6 ft 1 in (1.85 m)	170 lb (77 kg)		Gonzaga
F	4	Kelly Tripucka	6 ft 6 in (1.98 m)	220 lb (100 kg)		Notre Dame

Coaches
Head coach
- Frank Layden
Assistant(s)
- Scott Layden
- Jerry Sloan

Legend
- (DP) Unsigned draft pick
- (FA) Free agent
- (S) Suspended
- Injured

== Regular season ==
=== Season standings ===
Midwest Division	W	L	PCT	GB	Home	Road	Div
y-Dallas Mavericks	55	27	.671	–	35–6	20–21	19–11
x-Utah Jazz	44	38	.537	11	31–10	13–28	19–11
x-Houston Rockets	42	40	.512	13	25–16	17–24	19–11
x-Denver Nuggets	37	45	.451	18	27–14	10–31	14–16
Sacramento Kings	29	53	.354	26	20–21	9–32	10–20
San Antonio Spurs	28	54	.341	27	21–20	7–34	9–21

#	Western Conference				
#	Team	W	L	PCT	GB
1	z-Los Angeles Lakers	65	17	.793	–
2	y-Dallas Mavericks	55	27	.671	10
3	x-Portland Trail Blazers	49	33	.598	16
4	x-Utah Jazz	44	38	.537	21
5	x-Golden State Warriors	42	40	.512	23
6	x-Houston Rockets	42	40	.512	23
7	x-Seattle SuperSonics	39	43	.476	26
8	x-Denver Nuggets	37	45	.451	28
9	Phoenix Suns	36	46	.439	29
10	Sacramento Kings	29	53	.354	36
11	San Antonio Spurs	28	54	.341	37
12	Los Angeles Clippers	12	70	.146	53

== Game log ==
=== Regular season ===
1986–87 game log
Total: 44–38 (home: 31–10; road: 13–28)
October: 0–1 (home: 0–0; road: 0–1)

Game	Date	Team	Score	High points	High rebounds	High assists	Location Attendance	Record
1	October 31	@ Dallas	L 77–103				Reunion Arena	0–1

November: 7–6 (home: 7–1; road: 0–5)

Game	Date	Team	Score	High points	High rebounds	High assists	Location Attendance	Record
2	November 1	Portland	W 119–110				Salt Palace	1–1
3	November 5	Cleveland	W 111–95				Salt Palace	2–1
4	November 6	@ Denver	L 121–135				McNichols Sports Arena	2–2
5	November 11	Dallas	W 104–103				Salt Palace	3–2
6	November 13	L.A. Clippers						
7	November 15	Denver	W 111–103				Salt Palace	5–2
8	November 16	@ Portland	L 103–124				Memorial Coliseum	5–3
9	November 20	@ Houston						
10	November 22	New Jersey						
11	November 25	@ Golden State						
12	November 26	Seattle						
13	November 28	Atlanta						
14	November 29	@ Dallas	L 107–118				Reunion Arena	7–7

December: 12–3 (home: 6–0; road: 6–3)

Game	Date	Team	Score	High points	High rebounds	High assists	Location Attendance	Record
15	December 3	Chicago						
16	December 5	New York						
17	December 6	@ Sacramento						
18	December 10	@ Denver	W 112–110				McNichols Sports Arena	11–7
19	December 11	Dallas	W 103–99				Salt Palace	12–7
20	December 13	L.A. Clippers						
21	December 16	@ Washington						
22	December 17	@ Detroit						
23	December 19	@ Cleveland	W 134–128 (2OT)				Richfield Coliseum	15–8
24	December 20	@ Chicago						
25	December 22	@ Philadelphia						
26	December 23	@ New Jersey						
27	December 27	Houston						
28	December 29	San Antonio						
29	December 30	@ San Antonio						

January: 6–8 (home: 5–3; road: 1–5)

Game	Date	Team	Score	High points	High rebounds	High assists	Location Attendance	Record
30	January 2	Philadelphia						
31	January 4	@ L.A. Lakers						
32	January 8	L.A. Lakers						
33	January 10	Indiana						
34	January 11	@ Seattle						
35	January 13	@ Portland	L 113–121				Memorial Coliseum	21–14
36	January 15	@ Phoenix						
37	January 17	@ San Antonio						
38	January 21	Detroit						
39	January 23	Golden State						
40	January 26	Seattle						
41	January 27	@ Houston						
42	January 29	Portland	W 120–114				Salt Palace	25–17
43	January 31	L.A. Clippers						

February: 7–6 (home: 5–4; road: 2–2)

Game	Date	Team	Score	High points	High rebounds	High assists	Location Attendance	Record
44	February 1	@ Sacramento						
45	February 3	Sacramento						
46	February 5	@ L.A. Clippers						
47	February 10	Phoenix						
48	February 13	@ Phoenix						
49	February 14	San Antonio						
50	February 16	Boston						
51	February 18	Milwaukee						
52	February 20	Washington						
53	February 21	@ Houston						
54	February 24	Seattle						
55	February 26	Houston						
56	February 28	L.A. Lakers						

March: 8–8 (home: 6–0; road: 2–8)

Game	Date	Team	Score	High points	High rebounds	High assists	Location Attendance	Record
57	March 3	@ New York						
58	March 4	@ Boston						
59	March 6	@ Milwaukee						
60	March 7	@ Atlanta						
61	March 9	@ Indiana						
62	March 11	@ Denver	L 116–122				McNichols Sports Arena	33–29
63	March 12	@ Sacramento						
64	March 14	Sacramento						
65	March 17	Golden State						
66	March 18	@ L.A. Lakers						
67	March 21	Houston						
68	March 23	Denver	W 122–118				Salt Palace	38–30
69	March 25	@ L.A. Clippers						
70	March 27	San Antonio						
71	March 28	@ Golden State						
72	March 31	Phoenix						

April: 4–6 (home: 2–2; road: 2–4)

Game	Date	Team	Score	High points	High rebounds	High assists	Location Attendance	Record
73	April 1	@ San Antonio						
74	April 3	@ Phoenix						
75	April 4	@ Dallas	L 107–121				Reunion Arena	41–34
76	April 6	Sacramento						
77	April 8	Dallas	W 103–90				Salt Palace	42–35
78	April 10	Denver	W 106–103				Salt Palace	43–35
79	April 12	@ Golden State						
80	April 14	@ Seattle						
81	April 16	L.A. Lakers						
82	April 17	@ Portland	L 101–111				Memorial Coliseum	44–38

1986–87 schedule

=== Playoffs ===
1987 playoff game log
First Round: 2–3 (home: 2–1; road: 0–2)

Game	Date	Team	Score	High points	High rebounds	High assists	Location Attendance	Series
1	April 23	Golden State	W 99–95	Malone, Bailey (20)	Mark Eaton (15)	Rickey Green (15)	Salt Palace; 11,376	1–0
2	April 25	Golden State	W 103–100	Darrell Griffith (25)	Karl Malone (13)	Hansen, Stockton (5)	Salt Palace; 12,095	2–0
3	April 29	@ Golden State	L 95–110	Kelly Tripucka (16)	Karl Malone (9)	John Stockton (8)	Oakland–Alameda County Coliseum Arena; 15,025	2–1
4	May 1	@ Golden State	L 94–98	Hansen, Malone (20)	Mark Eaton (15)	John Stockton (11)	Oakland–Alameda County Coliseum Arena; 15,025	2–2
5	May 3	Golden State	L 113–118	Karl Malone (23)	Mark Eaton (10)	John Stockton (13)	Salt Palace; 11,071	2–3

1987 schedule

== Awards and records ==
- Mark Eaton, NBA All-Defensive Second Team
