= 1986–87 Golden State Warriors season =

NBA professional basketball team season

- Head coach: George Karl
- Arena: Oakland-Alameda County Coliseum Arena

Results
- Record: 42–40 (.512)
- Place: Division: 3rd (Pacific); Conference: 5th (Western)
- Playoff finish: West Conference Semi-finals (lost to Lakers 1–4)
- Stats at Basketball Reference

Local media
- Television: KPIX-TV
- Radio: KNBR

The 1986–87 Golden State Warriors season was the Warriors' 41st season in the NBA and 24th in the San Francisco Bay Area.

In the playoffs, the Warriors defeated the Utah Jazz in five games in the First Round, before losing to the eventual NBA champion Los Angeles Lakers in five games in the Semi-finals.

== Draft picks ==
Round	Pick	Player	Position	Nationality	College
1	3	Chris Washburn	C	United States	North Carolina State
3	51	Mike Williams	PF	United States	Bradley
3	59	Wendell Alexis	PF	United States	Syracuse
4	75	Dan Bingenheimer		United States	Missouri
5	97	Clinton Smith	SF	United States	Cleveland State
6	121	Bobby Lee Hurt		United States	Alabama
7	143	Steve Kenilvort		United States	Santa Clara

== Roster ==
Golden State Warriors roster
Players

Pos.	No.	Player	Height	Weight	DOB	From
F	5	Greg Ballard	6 ft 7 in (2.01 m)	215 lb (98 kg)		Oregon
C	2	Joe Barry Carroll	7 ft 0 in (2.13 m)	225 lb (102 kg)		Purdue
G	21	Sleepy Floyd	6 ft 3 in (1.91 m)	170 lb (77 kg)		Georgetown
F	22	Rod Higgins	6 ft 7 in (2.01 m)	200 lb (91 kg)		Fresno State
F	30	Ben McDonald	6 ft 8 in (2.03 m)	210 lb (95 kg)		UC Irvine
G	10	Perry Moss	6 ft 2 in (1.88 m)	185 lb (84 kg)		Northeastern
G/F	17	Chris Mullin	6 ft 6 in (1.98 m)	200 lb (91 kg)		St. John's
G/F	45	Purvis Short	6 ft 7 in (2.01 m)	210 lb (95 kg)		Jackson State
G	11	Clinton Smith	6 ft 6 in (1.98 m)	210 lb (95 kg)		Cleveland State
F	13	Larry Smith	6 ft 8 in (2.03 m)	215 lb (98 kg)		Alcorn State
G/F	20	Terry Teagle	6 ft 5 in (1.96 m)	195 lb (88 kg)		Baylor
C	8	Chris Washburn	6 ft 11 in (2.11 m)	225 lb (102 kg)		NC State
C	33	Jerome Whitehead	6 ft 10 in (2.08 m)	220 lb (100 kg)		Marquette

Coaches
Head coach
- George Karl
Assistant(s)
- Ed Gregory
- Herman Kull
- Jack McMahon

Legend
- (DP) Unsigned draft pick
- (FA) Free agent
- (S) Suspended
- Injured

== Regular season ==
=== Season standings ===
Pacific Division	W	L	PCT	GB	Home	Road	Div
y-Los Angeles Lakers	65	17	.793	–	37–4	28–13	24–6
x-Portland Trail Blazers	49	33	.598	16	34–7	15–26	17–13
x-Golden State Warriors	42	40	.512	23	25–16	17–24	17–13
x-Seattle SuperSonics	39	43	.476	26	25–16	14–27	15–15
Phoenix Suns	36	46	.439	29	26–15	10–31	14–16
Los Angeles Clippers	12	70	.146	53	9–32	3–38	3–27

#	Western Conference				
#	Team	W	L	PCT	GB
1	z-Los Angeles Lakers	65	17	.793	–
2	y-Dallas Mavericks	55	27	.671	10
3	x-Portland Trail Blazers	49	33	.598	16
4	x-Utah Jazz	44	38	.537	21
5	x-Golden State Warriors	42	40	.512	23
6	x-Houston Rockets	42	40	.512	23
7	x-Seattle SuperSonics	39	43	.476	26
8	x-Denver Nuggets	37	45	.451	28
9	Phoenix Suns	36	46	.439	29
10	Sacramento Kings	29	53	.354	36
11	San Antonio Spurs	28	54	.341	37
12	Los Angeles Clippers	12	70	.146	53

z - clinched division title
y - clinched division title
x - clinched playoff spot

== Playoffs ==
1987 playoff game log
First round: 3–2 (home: 2–0; road: 1–2)

Game	Date	Team	Score	High points	High rebounds	High assists	Location Attendance	Series
1	April 23	@ Utah	L 85–99	Joe Barry Carroll (18)	Joe Barry Carroll (9)	Sleepy Floyd (8)	Salt Palace; 11,376	0–1
2	April 25	@ Utah	L 100–103	Joe Barry Carroll (22)	Larry Smith (12)	Sleepy Floyd (9)	Salt Palace; 12,095	0–2
3	April 29	Utah	W 110–95	Terry Teagle (30)	Larry Smith (17)	Sleepy Floyd (8)	Oakland–Alameda County Coliseum Arena; 15,025	1–2
4	May 1	Utah	W 98–94	Purvis Short (32)	Larry Smith (8)	Sleepy Floyd (11)	Oakland–Alameda County Coliseum Arena; 15,025	2–2
5	May 3	@ Utah	W 118–113	Joe Barry Carroll (24)	Larry Smith (14)	Sleepy Floyd (14)	Salt Palace; 11,071	3–2

Conference Semi-finals: 1–4 (home: 1–1; road: 0–3)

Game	Date	Team	Score	High points	High rebounds	High assists	Location Attendance	Series
1	May 5	@ L.A. Lakers	L 116–125	Joe Barry Carroll (22)	Larry Smith (7)	Larry Smith (11)	The Forum; 17,505	0–1
2	May 7	@ L.A. Lakers	L 101–116	Joe Barry Carroll (22)	Larry Smith (13)	Sleepy Floyd (12)	The Forum; 17,505	0–2
3	May 9	L.A. Lakers	L 108–133	Joe Barry Carroll (23)	Larry Smith (15)	Sleepy Floyd (12)	Oakland–Alameda County Coliseum Arena; 15,025	0–3
4	May 10	L.A. Lakers	W 129–121	Sleepy Floyd (51)	Larry Smith (16)	Sleepy Floyd (10)	Oakland–Alameda County Coliseum Arena; 15,025	1–3
5	May 12	@ L.A. Lakers	L 108–116	Purvis Short (20)	Larry Smith (23)	Sleepy Floyd (11)	The Forum; 17,505	1–4

1987 schedule

== Transactions ==
=== Free agents ===
Additions
Player	Date signed	Former team
John Schweitz	September 5	Cincinnati Slammers (CBA)
Phil Ford	September 23	Houston Rockets
Ben McDonald	September 24	Cleveland Cavaliers
Barry Stevens	September 30	none
Rod Higgins	October 2	Chicago Bulls
Kenny Patterson	October 2	N/A
Bryan Warrick	October 2	Indiana Pacers
Perry Moss	November 6	Philadelphia 76ers
Kevin Henderson (10-day)	February 9	none
Kevin Henderson	June 14	Golden State Warriors

Subtractions
Player	Date signed	New Team
Brad Wright	September 17	Wyoming Wildcatters (CBA)
Mike Williams	October 10	CB Murcia (Spain)
John Schweitz	October 20	Detroit Pistons
Gary Plummer	October 22	Charleston Gunners (CBA)
Pete Verhoeven	October 28	Indiana Pacers
Geoff Huston	November 11	Los Angeles Clippers

== See also ==
- 1986-87 NBA season
