= Myron Jackson =

American basketball player (born 1964)

Personal information
- Born: May 6, 1964 (age 62) Hamburg, Arkansas
- Listed height: 6 ft 3 in (1.91 m)
- Listed weight: 185 lb (84 kg)

Career information
- High school: Hamburg (Hamburg, Arkansas)
- College: Little Rock (1982–1986)
- NBA draft: 1986: 4th round, 85th overall pick
- Drafted by: Dallas Mavericks
- Position: Point guard
- Number: 6

Career history
- 1986: Dallas Mavericks
- 1986–1987: La Crosse Catbirds

Career highlights
- TAAC Player of the Year (1986); First-team All-TAAC (1986)
- Stats at NBA.com
- Stats at Basketball Reference

Myron Jackson (born May 6, 1964) is a retired American professional basketball player who played briefly in the National Basketball Association (NBA). Born in Hamburg, Arkansas, he was a 6-foot-3-inch (191 cm), 185-pound (84 kg) point guard and played collegiately at University of Arkansas at Little Rock.

Jackson was selected with the 15th pick of the fourth round in the 1986 NBA draft by the Dallas Mavericks. He played eight games for the Mavericks in the 1986–87 season, averaging 1.4 points, 0.4 rebounds and 0.8 assists per game.

== Career statistics ==
Legend
GP	Games played	GS	Games started	MPG	Minutes per game
FG%	Field goal percentage	3P%	3-point field goal percentage	FT%	Free throw percentage
RPG	Rebounds per game	APG	Assists per game	SPG	Steals per game
BPG	Blocks per game	PPG	Points per game	**Bold**	Career high

=== NBA ===
==== Regular season ====
Year	Team	GP	GS	MPG	FG%	3P%	FT%	RPG	APG	SPG	BPG	PPG
1986–87	Dallas	8	0	2.8	.222	–	.875	.4	.8	.1	.0	1.4
