= ARCO Arena (1985) =

Temporary indoor arena in Sacramento, California

- The Madhouse on Market Street
- Interactive map of ARCO Arena
- Former names: Sacramento Sports Arena
- Location: 1625 North Market Boulevard, Sacramento, California
- Coordinates: 38.647303°N 121.498531°W
- Owner: Buzz Oates Group of Companies
- Operator: Buzz Oates Group of Companies
- Capacity: 10,333

Construction
- Groundbreaking: January 14, 1985
- Opened: September 20, 1985
- Closed: 1988 (converted to office building)
- Cost: $12 million

Tenants
- California Department of Consumer Affairs (current); Sacramento Kings (NBA) (1985–1988)

ARCO Arena (originally called the Sacramento Sports Arena and sometimes referred to as the Original ARCO Arena or ARCO Arena I to distinguish it from its successor) was an indoor arena in Sacramento, California. It was the NBA's smallest arena as it held just 10,333 people and was built in 1985 to temporarily accommodate the NBA's Sacramento Kings, who had relocated from Kansas City. The arena's first event was a fashion show on September 20, 1985. The arena also hosted boxing matches.

The idea to move the Kings to the building was first pitched in late 1984, with the building being described as a "warehouse under construction" by The Sacramento Bee. The arena cost $12 million to build.

Located north of Sacramento's downtown, ARCO Arena was nicknamed "The Madhouse on Market Street", and Kings games in this small venue were 100% sold out. Its official name of "ARCO Arena" is believed to be the first example of an NBA team selling naming rights to a brand new facility: in this case, rights were sold to the Atlantic Richfield Company, which is now a subsidiary of Marathon Petroleum. The Kings sold the naming rights for $5 million over ten years in August 1985, which included the naming rights for the new arena.According to his memoir, Bob Whitsitt, then the Kings’ vice president, developed and sold the arena’s naming-rights sponsorship to ARCO after owner Gregg Lukenbill proposed the idea.

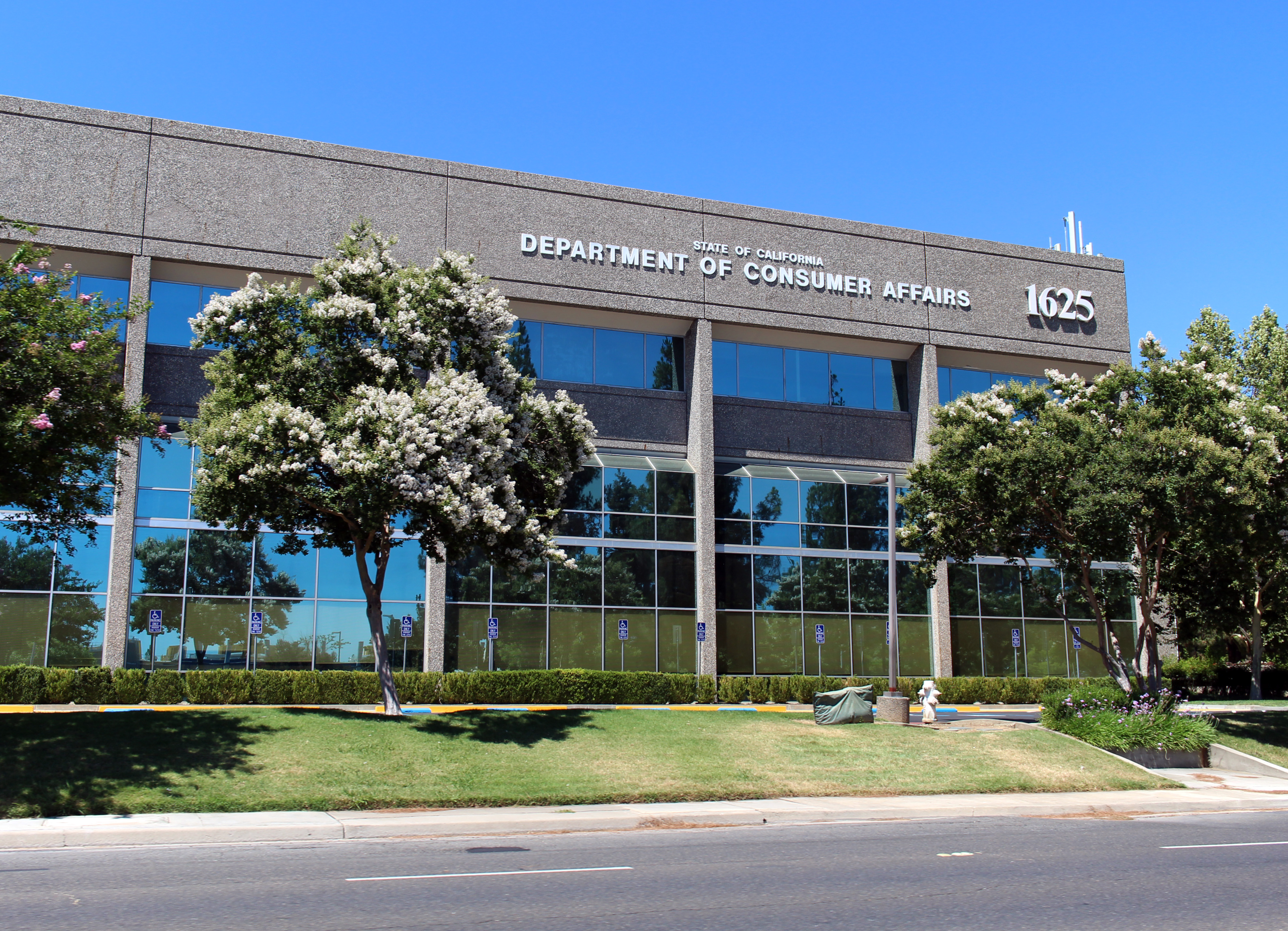
The former Arco Arena, now the headquarters of the California Department of Consumer Affairs, 2021

The Kings left this building in 1988 to move to the new ARCO Arena, built one mile (1.6 km) to the west. The structure survived as an office building for Sprint Communications. On December 19, 2005, the California Department of Consumer Affairs moved their headquarters into the building.

Preceded by Kemper Arena	Home of the Sacramento Kings; 1985–1988	Succeeded by ARCO Arena
