= List of NBA players with most championships =

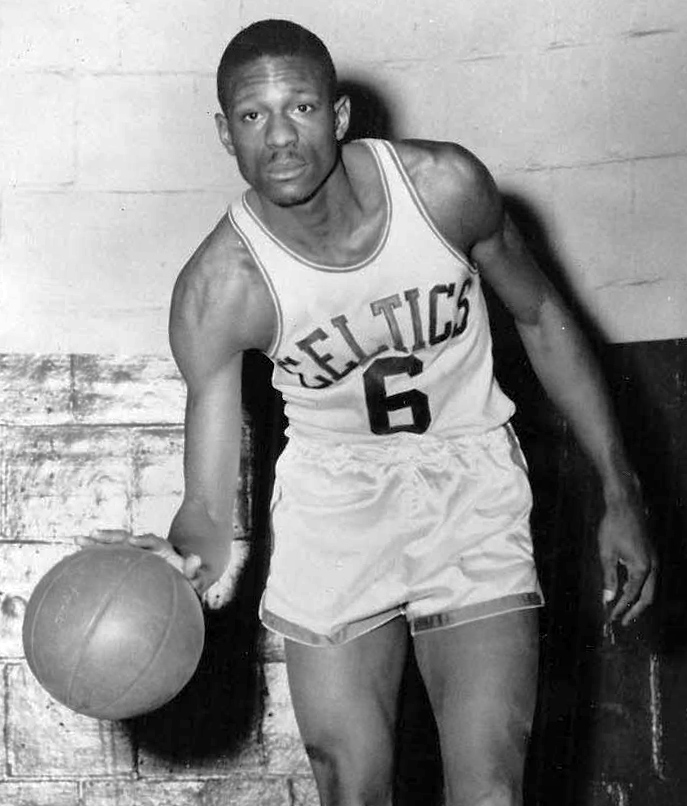
Bill Russell won 11 championships with the Boston Celtics, an NBA record.

The following is a list of National Basketball Association (NBA) players who won the most championships.

The NBA is a major professional basketball league in North America. It was founded in 1946 as the Basketball Association of America (BAA). The league adopted its current name at the start of the 1949–50 NBA season when it merged with the National Basketball League (NBL). The NBA Finals is the championship series for the NBA and the conclusion of the sport's postseason. The winning team of the series receives the Larry O'Brien Championship Trophy. Players from the winning team usually receive championship rings from the team honoring their contribution, with "rings" becoming shorthand for championships. The number of championships won by NBA superstars is often used as a measurement of their greatness.

Boston Celtics center Bill Russell holds the record for the most NBA championships won with 11 titles during his 13 years playing career.

As of the 2026 NBA Finals, Robert Horry, John Salley, LeBron James and Danny Green are the only players to have won championships with three different teams.

== List ==
Pos	G	Guard	F	Forward	C	Center
*	Denotes players who have been inducted to the Basketball Hall of Fame					
^	Denotes players who are currently active in the NBA					
†	Not yet eligible for Hall of Fame consideration^{[a]}					
§	1st time eligible for Hall of Fame in 2026					

No.	Player	Pos	Seasons		Championship teams	Ref.
No.	Player	Pos	Played	Win pct.	Championship teams	Ref.
11	Bill Russell*^{[b]}	C	13	85%	Boston Celtics (1957, 1959, 1960, 1961, 1962, 1963, 1964, 1965, 1966, 1968, 1969)	
10	Sam Jones*	G	12	83%	Boston Celtics (1959, 1960, 1961, 1962, 1963, 1964, 1965, 1966, 1968, 1969)	
8	Tom Heinsohn*^{[c]}	F	9	89%	Boston Celtics (1957, 1959, 1960, 1961, 1962, 1963, 1964, 1965)	
8	K. C. Jones*^{[d]}	G	9	89%	Boston Celtics (1959, 1960, 1961, 1962, 1963, 1964, 1965, 1966)	
8	Satch Sanders*^{[e]}	F	13	62%	Boston Celtics (1961, 1962, 1963, 1964, 1965, 1966, 1968, 1969)	
8	John Havlicek*	F/G	16	50%	Boston Celtics (1963, 1964, 1965, 1966, 1968, 1969, 1974, 1976)	
7	Jim Loscutoff^{[f]}	F	9	78%	Boston Celtics (1957, 1959, 1960, 1961, 1962, 1963, 1964)	
7	Frank Ramsey*	F/G	9	78%	Boston Celtics (1957, 1959, 1960, 1961, 1962, 1963, 1964)	
7	Robert Horry	F	16	44%	Houston Rockets (1994, 1995); Los Angeles Lakers (2000, 2001, 2002); San Antonio Spurs (2005, 2007)	
6	Bob Cousy*	G	14	43%	Boston Celtics (1957, 1959, 1960, 1961, 1962, 1963)	
6	Kareem Abdul-Jabbar* (formerly Lew Alcindor)^{[g]}	C	20	30%	Milwaukee Bucks (1971); Los Angeles Lakers (1980, 1982, 1985, 1987, 1988)	
6	Michael Jordan*	G	15	40%	Chicago Bulls (1991, 1992, 1993, 1996, 1997, 1998)	
6	Scottie Pippen*	F	17	35%	Chicago Bulls (1991, 1992, 1993, 1996, 1997, 1998)	
5	George Mikan*	C	7	71%	Minneapolis Lakers (1949, 1950, 1952, 1953, 1954)	
5	Jim Pollard*	F	7	71%	Minneapolis Lakers (1949, 1950, 1952, 1953, 1954)	
5	Slater Martin*	G	11	45%	Minneapolis Lakers (1950, 1952, 1953, 1954); St. Louis Hawks (1958)	
5	Larry Siegfried	G	9	56%	Boston Celtics (1964, 1965, 1966, 1968, 1969)	
5	Don Nelson*^{[h]}	F	14	36%	Boston Celtics (1966, 1968, 1969, 1974, 1976)	
5	Michael Cooper*	G/F	12	42%	Los Angeles Lakers (1980, 1982, 1985, 1987, 1988)	
5	Magic Johnson*	G	13	38%	Los Angeles Lakers (1980, 1982, 1985, 1987, 1988)	
5	Dennis Rodman*	F	14	36%	Detroit Pistons (1989, 1990); Chicago Bulls (1996, 1997, 1998)	
5	Ron Harper	G	15	33%	Chicago Bulls (1996, 1997, 1998); Los Angeles Lakers (2000, 2001)	
5	Steve Kerr^{[i]}	G	15	33%	Chicago Bulls (1996, 1997, 1998); San Antonio Spurs (1999, 2003)	
5	Kobe Bryant*	G	20	25%	Los Angeles Lakers (2000, 2001, 2002, 2009, 2010)	
5	Derek Fisher	G	18	28%	Los Angeles Lakers (2000, 2001, 2002, 2009, 2010)	
5	Tim Duncan*	F/C	19	26%	San Antonio Spurs (1999, 2003, 2005, 2007, 2014)	
4	Vern Mikkelsen*	F	10	40%	Minneapolis Lakers (1950, 1952, 1953, 1954)	
4	Frank Saul	G	6	67%	Rochester Royals (1951); Minneapolis Lakers (1952, 1953, 1954)	
4	Bill Sharman*^{[j]}	G	11	36%	Boston Celtics (1957, 1959, 1960, 1961)	
4	Gene Guarilia	F	4	100%	Boston Celtics (1960, 1961, 1962, 1963)	
4	Jamaal Wilkes*	G/F	12	33%	Golden State Warriors (1975); Los Angeles Lakers (1980, 1982, 1985^{[k]})	
4	Kurt Rambis	F	14	29%	Los Angeles Lakers (1982, 1985, 1987, 1988)	
4	Robert Parish*	C	21	19%	Boston Celtics (1981, 1984, 1986); Chicago Bulls (1997)	
4	Will Perdue	C	13	31%	Chicago Bulls (1991, 1992, 1993); San Antonio Spurs (1999)	
4	John Salley	F/C	11	36%	Detroit Pistons (1989, 1990); Chicago Bulls (1996); Los Angeles Lakers (2000)	
4	Horace Grant	F/C	17	24%	Chicago Bulls (1991, 1992, 1993); Los Angeles Lakers (2001)	
4	Shaquille O'Neal*	C	19	21%	Los Angeles Lakers (2000, 2001, 2002); Miami Heat (2006)	
4	Manu Ginóbili*	G	16	25%	San Antonio Spurs (2003, 2005, 2007, 2014)	
4	Tony Parker*	G	18	22%	San Antonio Spurs (2003, 2005, 2007, 2014)	
4	LeBron James^	F	23	17%	Miami Heat (2012, 2013); Cleveland Cavaliers (2016); Los Angeles Lakers (2020)	
4	Stephen Curry^	G	17	24%	Golden State Warriors (2015, 2017, 2018, 2022)	
4	Klay Thompson^	G	13	31%	Golden State Warriors (2015, 2017, 2018, 2022)	
4	Draymond Green^	F	14	29%	Golden State Warriors (2015, 2017, 2018, 2022)	
4	Andre Iguodala	F	19	21%	Golden State Warriors (2015, 2017, 2018, 2022)	
3	Bob Harrison	G	9	33%	Minneapolis Lakers (1950, 1952, 1953)	
3	Whitey Skoog	G	6	50%	Minneapolis Lakers (1952, 1953, 1954)	
3	Gene Conley	G	6	50%	Boston Celtics (1959, 1960, 1961)	
3	Clyde Lovellette*	C	11	27%	Minneapolis Lakers (1954); Boston Celtics (1963, 1964)	
3	Willie Naulls	F	10	30%	Boston Celtics (1964, 1965, 1966)	
3	Paul Silas	F	16	19%	Boston Celtics (1974, 1976); Seattle SuperSonics (1979)	
3	Mitch Kupchak	F/C	11	27%	Washington Bullets (1978); Los Angeles Lakers (1982^{[l]}, 1985)	
3	Dennis Johnson*	G	14	21%	Seattle SuperSonics (1979); Boston Celtics (1984, 1986)	
3	Larry Bird*	F	13	23%	Boston Celtics (1981, 1984, 1986)	
3	Kevin McHale*	F	13	23%	Boston Celtics (1981, 1984, 1986)	
3	Byron Scott	G	14	21%	Los Angeles Lakers (1985, 1987, 1988)	
3	James Worthy*	F	12	25%	Los Angeles Lakers (1985, 1987, 1988)	
3	Gerald Henderson	G	13	23%	Boston Celtics (1981, 1984); Detroit Pistons (1990)	
3	B. J. Armstrong	G	11	27%	Chicago Bulls (1991, 1992, 1993)	
3	Bill Cartwright	C	15	20%	Chicago Bulls (1991, 1992, 1993)	
3	Stacey King	F/C	8	38%	Chicago Bulls (1991, 1992, 1993)	
3	John Paxson	G	11	27%	Chicago Bulls (1991, 1992, 1993)	
3	Scott Williams	F/C	15	20%	Chicago Bulls (1991, 1992, 1993)	
3	James Edwards	C	19	16%	Detroit Pistons (1989, 1990); Chicago Bulls (1996)	
3	Randy Brown	G	12	25%	Chicago Bulls (1996, 1997, 1998)	
3	Jud Buechler	F	12	25%	Chicago Bulls (1996, 1997, 1998)	
3	Toni Kukoč*	F	13	23%	Chicago Bulls (1996, 1997, 1998)	
3	Luc Longley	C	10	30%	Chicago Bulls (1996, 1997, 1998)	
3	Dickey Simpkins	F/C	7	43%	Chicago Bulls (1996, 1997, 1998)	
3	Bill Wennington	C	13	23%	Chicago Bulls (1996, 1997, 1998)	
3	Mario Elie	G/F	11	27%	Houston Rockets (1994, 1995); San Antonio Spurs (1999)	
3	A.C. Green	F	16	19%	Los Angeles Lakers (1987, 1988, 2000)	
3	Rick Fox	F	13	23%	Los Angeles Lakers (2000, 2001, 2002)	
3	Devean George	F	11	27%	Los Angeles Lakers (2000, 2001, 2002)	
3	Brian Shaw	G	14	21%	Los Angeles Lakers (2000, 2001, 2002)	
3	Bruce Bowen	F	13	23%	San Antonio Spurs (2003, 2005, 2007)	
3	Sam Cassell	G	15	20%	Houston Rockets (1994, 1995); Boston Celtics (2008)	
3	Udonis Haslem	F	20	15%	Miami Heat (2006, 2012, 2013)	
3	Dwyane Wade*	G	16	19%	Miami Heat (2006, 2012, 2013)	
3	James Jones	F	14	21%	Miami Heat (2012, 2013); Cleveland Cavaliers (2016)	
3	Shaun Livingston	G	14	21%	Golden State Warriors (2015, 2017, 2018)	
3	Patrick McCaw	G/F	5	60%	Golden State Warriors (2017, 2018); Toronto Raptors (2019)	
3	Danny Green^{†}	G	14	21%	San Antonio Spurs (2014); Toronto Raptors (2019); Los Angeles Lakers (2020)	
3	JaVale McGee	C	16	19%	Golden State Warriors (2017, 2018); Los Angeles Lakers (2020)	
3	Kevon Looney^	F/C	11	27%	Golden State Warriors (2017, 2018, 2022)	

== See also ==
- List of NBA champions
- List of NBA championship head coaches
- List of individuals with most NBA championships
- List of NBA regular season records

== Notes ==
^{a} A player is not eligible for induction into the Naismith Memorial Basketball Hall of Fame until he has been fully retired for two calendar years.
^{b} Russell was inducted both as a player and as a coach.
^{c} Heinsohn won two additional championships in 1974 and 1976 as head coach of the Boston Celtics.
^{d} Jones won four additional championships: in 1972 as assistant coach of the Los Angeles Lakers, in 1981 as assistant coach of the Boston Celtics, and in 1984 and 1986 as head coach of the Celtics.
^{e} Sanders was inducted into the Hall of Fame as a contributor.
^{f} Loscutoff did not play in the 1960 playoffs and Finals due to injury.
^{g} Alcindor changed his name to Kareem Abdul-Jabbar in 1971 after winning his first championship. He also won two championships as an assistant coach with the Lakers in 2009 and 2010.
^{h} Nelson was inducted into the Hall of Fame as a coach.
^{i} Kerr won additional championships in 2015, 2017, 2018 and 2022 as head coach of the Golden State Warriors.
^{j} Sharman won an additional championship in 1972 as head coach of the Los Angeles Lakers.
^{k} Wilkes did not play in the 1985 playoffs due to injury, but remained on the roster until after the Finals.
^{l} Kupchak was injured 26 games into the 1981–82 NBA season, resulting in him missing the remainder of that season including the playoffs. He did not remain on the roster, but he did receive recognition as a member of the 1982 championship team.
