= List of individuals with most NBA championships =

This is a list of individuals with the most combined NBA championships. The National Basketball Association (NBA) is a major professional basketball league in North America. It was founded in 1946 as the Basketball Association of America (BAA). The league adopted its current name at the start of the 1949–50 season when it merged with the National Basketball League (NBL). The NBA Finals is the championship series for the NBA and the conclusion of the sport's postseason. The winning team's players, coaches, and members of the executive front office usually receive championship rings from the team honoring their contribution, with "rings" becoming shorthand for championships. However, in some rare occasion, the teams opted to give other commemorative items, such as wrist watches, instead of rings. An NBA team can choose who in their organization is awarded a ring; in addition to the players, coaches, and the front office, rings can and are awarded to trainers, medical staff, scouts, and occasionally cheerleaders, equipment managers, mascots and other arena staff. This list is limited to individuals who won a ring as at least one of the following:

- a player,
- a head coach,
- an assistant coach,
- a front office executive.

== List ==
No. of championships	Name	As a...	Team(s) won with (years)	Ref.
16	Red Auerbach	head coach	Boston Celtics (1957, 1959, 1960, 1961, 1962, 1963, 1964, 1965, 1966)	
16	Red Auerbach	executive	Boston Celtics (1968, 1969, 1974, 1976, 1981, 1984, 1986)	
13	Phil Jackson	player	New York Knicks (1970, 1973)	
13	Phil Jackson	head coach	Chicago Bulls (1991–1993, 1996–1998); Los Angeles Lakers (2000–2002, 2009, 2010)	
12	K.C. Jones	player	Boston Celtics (1959–1966)	
12	K.C. Jones	assistant coach	Los Angeles Lakers (1972); Boston Celtics (1981)	
12	K.C. Jones	head coach	Boston Celtics (1984, 1986)	
11	Bill Russell	player	Boston Celtics (1957, 1959–1966)	
11	Bill Russell	player and head coach	Boston Celtics (1968, 1969)	
10	Tommy Heinsohn	player	Boston Celtics (1957, 1959–1965)	
10	Tommy Heinsohn	head coach	Boston Celtics (1974, 1976)	
10	Bill Sharman	player	Boston Celtics (1957, 1959–1961)	
10	Bill Sharman	head coach	Los Angeles Lakers (1972)	
10	Bill Sharman	executive	Los Angeles Lakers (1980, 1982, 1985, 1987, 1988)	
10	Sam Jones	player	Boston Celtics (1959–1966, 1968, 1969)	
10	Mitch Kupchak	player	Washington Bullets (1978); Los Angeles Lakers (1982, 1985)	
10	Mitch Kupchak	executive	Los Angeles Lakers (1987, 1988, 2000–2002, 2009, 2010)	
10^{[a]}	Bill Bertka	assistant coach	Los Angeles Lakers (1972, 1982, 1985, 1987, 1988, 2000, 2001)	
10^{[a]}	Bill Bertka	executive	Los Angeles Lakers (2002, 2009)	
10	Jim Cleamons	player	Los Angeles Lakers (1972)	
10	Jim Cleamons	assistant coach	Chicago Bulls (1991–1993, 1996); Los Angeles Lakers (2000–2002, 2009, 2010)	
9^{[b]}	Tex Winter	assistant coach	Chicago Bulls (1991–1993, 1996–1998); Los Angeles Lakers (2000–2002)	
9	Pat Riley	player	Los Angeles Lakers (1972)	
9	Pat Riley	assistant coach	Los Angeles Lakers (1980)	
9	Pat Riley	head coach	Los Angeles Lakers (1982, 1985, 1987, 1988); Miami Heat (2006)	
9	Pat Riley	executive	Miami Heat (2012, 2013)	
9	Steve Kerr	player	Chicago Bulls (1996–1998); San Antonio Spurs (1999, 2003)	
9	Steve Kerr	head coach	Golden State Warriors (2015, 2017, 2018, 2022)	
9	Jerry West	player	Los Angeles Lakers (1972)	
9	Jerry West	executive	Los Angeles Lakers (1980, 1982, 1985, 1987, 1988, 2000); Golden State Warriors (2015, 2017)	

- ^{a} Bertka was also a scouting consultant on the 2010 Lakers championship staff.
- ^{b} Winter was also a coaching consultant on the 2009 Lakers championship staff.

== See also ==
- List of NBA champions
- List of NBA championship head coaches
- List of NBA players with most championships
