= List of NBA championship head coaches =

The National Basketball Association (NBA) is a major professional basketball league in North America. It was founded in 1946 as the Basketball Association of America (BAA). The league adopted its current name at the start of the 1949–50 NBA season when it merged with the National Basketball League (NBL). The league consists of 30 teams, of which 29 are located in the United States and 1 in Canada. In the NBA, a head coach is the highest ranking coach of a coaching staff. They typically hold a more public profile and are paid more than the assistant coaches.

Former Los Angeles Lakers and Chicago Bulls head coach Phil Jackson has won eleven NBA championships, the most in NBA history. He won six titles with the Chicago Bulls and five titles with the Los Angeles Lakers, and is one of three coaches who have won multiple championships with more than one team (Pat Riley and Alex Hannum are the others). Red Auerbach won nine championships with the Boston Celtics, including eight consecutive titles from 1959 to 1966. John Kundla, Pat Riley and Gregg Popovich have each won five championships. John Kundla won all of his titles with the Los Angeles Lakers, and Gregg Popovich won all of his titles with the San Antonio Spurs, while Pat Riley won four titles with the Los Angeles Lakers and one with the Miami Heat. Current Golden State Warriors head coach Steve Kerr has won four championships, while current Miami Heat head coach Erik Spoelstra has won two titles. Indiana Pacers head coach Rick Carlisle, Los Angeles Clippers head coach Tyronn Lue, Philadelphia 76ers head coach Nick Nurse, Boston Celtics head coach Joe Mazzulla, Oklahoma City Thunder head coach Mark Daigneault, and New York Knicks head coach Mike Brown are the only other active coaches who have won a championship. Carlisle won while with the Dallas Mavericks in 2011, Lue with the Cleveland Cavaliers in 2016, Nurse with the Toronto Raptors in 2019, Mazzulla with the Boston Celtics in 2024, Daigneault with the Oklahoma City Thunder in 2025, and Brown with the New York Knicks in 2026.

== Other achievements ==
- Of the championship head coaches, 18 (Red Auerbach, Larry Brown, Mike Brown, Rick Carlisle, Mark Daigneault, Bill Fitch, Tom Heinsohn, Red Holzman, Phil Jackson, Steve Kerr, Joe Mazzulla, Dick Motta, Nick Nurse, Gregg Popovich, Pat Riley, Doc Rivers, Bill Sharman, and Lenny Wilkens) have won the Coach of the Year Award.
- 16 (Red Auerbach, Larry Brown, Chuck Daly, Bill Fitch, Alex Hannum, Tom Heinsohn, Red Holzman, Phil Jackson, John Kundla, Gregg Popovich, Jack Ramsay, Pat Riley, Doc Rivers, Bill Sharman, Rudy Tomjanovich, and Lenny Wilkens) have been elected to the Naismith Memorial Basketball Hall of Fame as a coach.
- 14 (Rick Carlisle, Larry Costello, Billy Cunningham, Tom Heinsohn, Red Holzman, Phil Jackson, Buddy Jeannette, K.C. Jones, Steve Kerr, Tyronn Lue, Pat Riley, Bill Russell, George Senesky, and Bill Sharman) also won championships as players, with both Buddy Jeannette and Bill Russell having won their only manager titles as player-coach.
- Pat Riley, Tyronn Lue and Paul Westhead are the only three coaches who have led teams to titles having only arrived in mid-season.

== Key ==
Yrs	Number of years coached
GC	Games coached
W	Wins
L	Losses
Win%	Winning percentage
^	Denotes coach who is currently coaching an NBA team
*	Elected to the Naismith Memorial Basketball Hall of Fame as a coach

== List ==
Note: Statistics are correct through the end of the 2025–26 NBA season.

Number won	Coach	Team(s) won with (years)^{[a]}	Coaching career^{[b]}	Yrs	GC	W	L	Win%	GC	W	L	Win%	Ref.
Number won	Coach	Team(s) won with (years)^{[a]}	Coaching career^{[b]}	Yrs	Regular season				Playoffs				Ref.
11	Phil Jackson*	Chicago Bulls (1991, 1992, 1993, 1996, 1997, 1998); Los Angeles Lakers (2000, 2001, 2002, 2009, 2010)	1989–1998, 1999–2004, 2005–2011	20	1,640	1,155	485	.704	333	229	104	.688	
9	Red Auerbach*	Boston Celtics (1957, 1959, 1960, 1961, 1962, 1963, 1964, 1965, 1966)	1946–1966	20	1,417	938	479	.662	168	99	69	.589	
5	John Kundla*	Minneapolis Lakers (1949, 1950, 1952, 1953, 1954)	1948–1958, 1958–1959	11	725	423	302	.583	95	60	35	.632	
5	Gregg Popovich*	San Antonio Spurs (1999, 2003, 2005, 2007, 2014)	1996–2025	29	2,214	1,390	824	.628	284	170	114	.599	
5	Pat Riley*	Los Angeles Lakers (1982, 1985, 1987, 1988); Miami Heat (2006)	1981–1990, 1991–2003, 2005–2008	24	1,904	1,210	694	.636	282	171	111	.606	
4	Steve Kerr^	Golden State Warriors (2015, 2017, 2018, 2022)	2014–present	12	957	604	353	.631	152	104	48	.684	
2	Chuck Daly*	Detroit Pistons (1989, 1990)	1981–1982, 1983–1994, 1997–1999	14	1,075	638	437	.593	126	75	51	.595	
2	Alex Hannum*	St. Louis Hawks (1958); Philadelphia 76ers (1967)	1956–1958, 1960–1968, 1969–1971	12	883	471	412	.533	81	47	34	.580	
2	Tom Heinsohn*	Boston Celtics (1974, 1976)	1969–1978	9	690	427	263	.619	80	47	33	.588	
2	Red Holzman*	New York Knicks (1970, 1973)	1954–1957, 1967–1977, 1978–1982	18	1,300	696	604	.535	106	58	48	.547	
2	K. C. Jones	Boston Celtics (1984, 1986)	1973–1976, 1983–1988, 1990–1992	10	774	522	252	.674	138	81	57	.587	
2	Bill Russell*	Boston Celtics (1968, 1969)	1966–1969, 1973–1977, 1987–1988	8	631	341	290	.540	61	34	27	.557	
2	Erik Spoelstra^	Miami Heat (2012, 2013)	2008–present	18	1,441	830	611	.576	193	110	83	.570	
2	Rudy Tomjanovich*	Houston Rockets (1994, 1995)	1992–2003, 2004–2005	13	943	527	416	.559	90	51	39	.567	
1	Al Attles*	Golden State Warriors (1975)	1969–1983	14	1,075	557	518	.518	61	31	30	.508	
1	Larry Brown*	Detroit Pistons (2004)	1976–1979, 1981–1983, 1988–2006, 2008–2010	27	2,002	1,098	904	.548	193	100	93	.518	
1	Mike Brown^	New York Knicks (2026)	2005–2010, 2011–2012, 2013–2014, 2022–2024, 2025–present	12	840	507	333	.604	109	66	43	.606	
1	Mike Budenholzer	Milwaukee Bucks (2021)	2013–2023, 2024–2025	11	883	520	363	.589	104	56	48	.538	
1	Rick Carlisle^	Dallas Mavericks (2011)	2001–2007, 2008–present	24	1,935	1,012	923	.523	173	86	87	.497	
1	Al Cervi	Syracuse Nationals (1955)	1949–1956, 1958–1959	9	567	326	241	.575	60	34	26	.567	
1	Larry Costello	Milwaukee Bucks (1971)	1968–1976, 1978–1979	10	730	430	300	.589	60	37	23	.617	
1	Billy Cunningham	Philadelphia 76ers (1983)	1977–1985	8	650	454	196	.698	105	66	39	.629	
1	Mark Daigneault^	Oklahoma City Thunder (2025)	2020–present	6	482	275	207	.571	48	33	15	.688	
1	Bill Fitch*	Boston Celtics (1981)	1970–1988, 1989–1992, 1994–1998	25	2,050	944	1,106	.460	109	55	54	.505	
1	Edward Gottlieb	Philadelphia Warriors (1947)	1946–1955	9	581	263	318	.453	32	15	17	.469	
1	Les Harrison	Rochester Royals (1951)	1948–1955	7	476	295	181	.620	38	19	19	.500	
1	Buddy Jeannette	Baltimore Bullets (1948)	1947–1952, 1964–1966, 1966–1968	7	354	151	203	.427	24	14	10	.583	
1	Tyronn Lue^	Cleveland Cavaliers (2016)	2016–2018, 2020–present	10	693	404	289	.583	98	57	41	.582	
1	Michael Malone	Denver Nuggets (2023)	2013–2025	12	904	510	394	.564	80	44	36	.550	
1	Joe Mazzulla^	Boston Celtics (2024)	2022–present	4	328	238	90	.726	57	36	21	.632	
1	Dick Motta	Washington Bullets (1978)	1968–1980, 1980–1987, 1990–1991, 1994–1997	25	1,952	935	1,017	.479	126	56	70	.444	
1	Nick Nurse^	Toronto Raptors (2019)	2018–present	8	636	343	293	.539	58	31	27	.534	
1	Jack Ramsay*	Portland Trail Blazers (1977)	1969–1972, 1973–1989	21	1,647	864	783	.525	102	44	58	.431	
1	Doc Rivers*	Boston Celtics (2008)	1999–2003, 2004–2026	27	2,060	1,194	866	.580	226	114	112	.504	
1	George Senesky	Philadelphia Warriors (1956)	1955–1958	3	216	119	97	.551	20	10	10	.500	
1	Bill Sharman*	Los Angeles Lakers (1972)	1966–1968, 1971–1977	7	573	333	240	.581	62	35	27	.565	
1	Frank Vogel	Los Angeles Lakers (2020)	2010–2018, 2019–2022, 2023–2024	12	902	480	422	.532	92	49	43	.533	
1	Paul Westhead	Los Angeles Lakers (1980)	1979–1981, 1982–1983, 1990–1992	6	407	183	224	.450	19	13	6	.684	
1	Lenny Wilkens*	Seattle SuperSonics (1979)	1969–1972, 1974–1976, 1977–1985, 1986–2003, 2004–2005	32	2,487	1,332	1,155	.536	178	80	98	.449	

== See also ==
- NBA Coach of the Year Award
- List of NBA champions
- List of NBA players with most championships
- List of individuals with most NBA championships

== Notes ==
- ^{a} Each year is linked to an article about the BAA/NBA Finals in that year.
- ^{b} Each year is linked to an article about that particular BAA/NBA season.
