= Randy Pfund =

American basketball coach and executive

Personal information
- Born: December 29, 1951 (age 74) Oak Park, Illinois, U.S.
- Listed height: 6 ft 0 in (1.83 m)
- Listed weight: 180 lb (82 kg)

Career information
- High school: Wheaton North (Wheaton, Illinois)
- College: Wheaton (Illinois) (1970–1974)
- Coaching career: 1974–1994

Career history

Coaching
- 1974–1977: Glenbard South HS (assistant)
- 1977–1985: Westmont (assistant)
- 1985–1992: Los Angeles Lakers (assistant)
- 1992–1994: Los Angeles Lakers

Career highlights
- As assistant coach: 2× NBA champion (1987, 1988); As Executive: NBA champion (2006)

Randall C. Pfund (born December 29, 1951) is an American former National Basketball Association (NBA) head coach and executive. He was an assistant coach for the Los Angeles Lakers under Pat Riley and Mike Dunleavy, and was the team's head coach during the 1992–93 and 1993–94 seasons.

He was fired 64 games into his second season and eventually replaced by Magic Johnson.

He was the general manager for the Miami Heat from 1995 until September 29, 2008. However, he served mostly in an advisory role to Riley, who as team president (and also head coach from 1995 to 2003 and from 2005 to 2008) had the final say in basketball matters.

Pfund played college basketball at Wheaton College, where he averaged nearly 25 points per game in his senior season.

His father, Lee Pfund, pitched for the Brooklyn Dodgers in 1945 and was his college coach at Wheaton.

== Head coaching record ==
Team	Year	G	W	L	W–L%	Finish	PG	PW	PL	PW–L%	Result
LA Lakers	1992–93	82	39	43	.476	5th in Pacific	5	2	3	.400	Lost in first round
LA Lakers	1993–94	64	27	37	.422		—	—	—	—	Missed playoffs
Career		146	66	80	.452		5	2	3	.400	
