= Mike Smrek =

Canadian basketball player (born 1962)

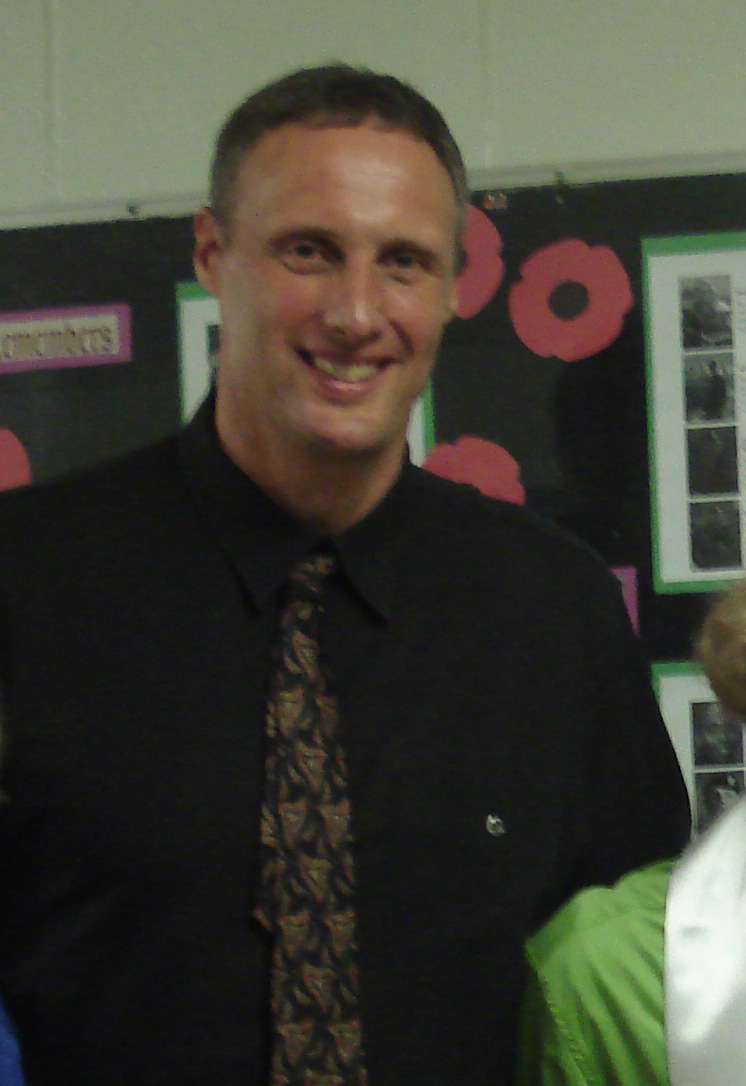
- Smrek in 2007 at a high school graduation ceremony

Personal information
- Born: 31 August 1962 (age 64) Welland, Ontario, Canada
- Listed height: 7 ft 0 in (2.13 m)
- Listed weight: 250 lb (113 kg)

Career information
- High school: Eastdale (Welland, Ontario)
- College: Canisius (1981–1985)
- NBA draft: 1985: 2nd round, 25th overall pick
- Drafted by: Portland Trail Blazers
- Playing career: 1985–1997
- Position: Centre
- Number: 52, 55, 11

Career history
- 1985–1986: Chicago Bulls
- 1986–1988: Los Angeles Lakers
- 1988–1989: San Antonio Spurs
- 1989–1990: Fulgor Libertas Forlì
- 1990: Golden State Warriors
- 1990–1991: Los Angeles Clippers
- 1992: Golden State Warriors
- 1992–1993: Dafni
- 1996–1997: KK Split

Career highlights
- 2× NBA champion (1987, 1988)
- Stats at NBA.com
- Stats at Basketball Reference

Michael Francis Smrek (born 31 August 1962) is a Canadian former professional basketball player. He was selected in the second round of the 1985 NBA draft by the Portland Trail Blazers, and played seven seasons in the league as a backup 7-foot (2.1 m) centre. He won two NBA championships with the Los Angeles Lakers.

== Early life ==
Smrek graduated from Eastdale High School in Welland, Ontario, having grown up in Port Robinson, Ontario, and a nearby rural farming community. He worked on his family farm and had little time for organized sports. He did not start playing basketball until grade 10 after being prodded by the high school coach to try out. "He was a nice guy, so I didn't want to hurt his feelings," Smrek said.

== College career ==
At Canisius College, Smrek averaged 9.1 points, 5.2 rebounds, 1.6 blocks, and 0.8 assists in 23 minutes a contest over four years. He is the college's second-leading career shot-blocker with 172 (compatriot Michael Meeks is first with 183). He also had the two best seasons for field-goal percentage in school history with a .632 FGP in 1983-84 and a .601 FGP in 1984–85.

== Professional career ==
Smrek was a back-up center, appearing in 194 games over seven seasons. He averaged 9.7 minutes, 2.9 points, 2.2 rebounds, and 0.8 blocks a contest during this time. Drafted by the Portland Trail Blazers with the first pick in the second round of the 1985 NBA draft out of Canisius College, he played as a rookie with future star Michael Jordan and the Chicago Bulls, appearing in 38 games and averaged around his career totals.

The NBA defending-champion Boston Celtics were interested in signing Smrek, but he chose the Los Angeles Lakers instead. He figured the Lakers provided him the best opportunity for a regular role in the NBA, as their starting center, Kareem Abdul-Jabbar, was approaching age 40. Smrek played sparingly in his two seasons with the Lakers, but earned NBA championship rings in 1987 and 1988. The first title was against the rival Celtics in six games. He then had a year with the San Antonio Spurs, parts of three seasons with the Golden State Warriors and a brief stint with the Los Angeles Clippers. He also played for the Toronto Raptors in the 1996 preseason.

As a Canadian national of Slovak descent, his NBA championship win in 1987 made him the first NBA-winning non-US national, along with Bahamian Mychal Thompson.

He played in Italy for Fulgor Libertas Forlì (1989–90), in the Greek League for Dafni BC (1992–93) and in Croatia for KK Split (1996–97).

== Personal life ==
Smrek and wife have two children, one son and one daughter. His son Luke played tennis at Marquette University, while his daughter Anna is a professional volleyball player. As a freshman in 2021, Anna was named Most Outstanding Player of the NCAA Final Four as the Badgers claimed their first-ever national title in the sport.

== Career statistics ==
Legend
| GP | Games played | GS | Games started | MPG | Minutes per game |
| FG% | Field goal percentage | 3P% | 3-point field goal percentage | FT% | Free throw percentage |
| RPG | Rebounds per game | APG | Assists per game | SPG | Steals per game |
| BPG | Blocks per game | PPG | Points per game | **Bold** | Career high |
| † | Won an NBA championship |

=== NBA ===
==== Regular season ====
| Year | Team | GP | GS | MPG | FG% | 3P% | FT% | RPG | APG | SPG | BPG | PPG |
|---|---|---|---|---|---|---|---|---|---|---|---|---|
| 1985–86 | Chicago | 38 | 5 | 10.7 | .377 | .000 | .552 | 2.9 | **.5** | .2 | .6 | 2.8 |
| 1986–87† | L.A. Lakers | 35 | 3 | 6.7 | .500 | – | .640 | 1.1 | .1 | .1 | .4 | 2.2 |
| 1987–88† | L.A. Lakers | **48** | 2 | 8.8 | .427 | – | **.667** | 1.8 | .2 | .1 | .9 | 2.8 |
| 1988–89 | San Antonio | 43 | **18** | **14.5** | .471 | – | .645 | **3.0** | .3 | .3 | **1.3** | **4.5** |
| 1989–90 | Golden State | 13 | 3 | 8.2 | .417 | – | .167 | 2.6 | .1 | .3 | .8 | 1.6 |
| 1990–91 | Golden State | 5 | 0 | 5.0 | **.545** | – | .500 | 1.4 | .2 | **.4** | .0 | 2.8 |
| 1990–91 | L.A. Clippers | 10 | 0 | 7.0 | .188 | – | .500 | 1.9 | .3 | .1 | .3 | 1.0 |
| 1991–92 | Golden State | 2 | 0 | 1.5 | – | – | – | .5 | .0 | .0 | .0 | .0 |
| Career | | 194 | 31 | 9.7 | .431 | .000 | .617 | 2.2 | .3 | .2 | .8 | 2.9 |

==== Playoffs ====
| Year | Team | GP | GS | MPG | FG% | 3P% | FT% | RPG | APG | SPG | BPG | PPG |
|---|---|---|---|---|---|---|---|---|---|---|---|---|
| 1986 | Chicago | 3 | 0 | 1.7 | .000 | – | – | .0 | .0 | .0 | .3 | .0 |
| 1987† | L.A. Lakers | **10** | 0 | 3.3 | **.200** | – | **.667** | .7 | .0 | .0 | **.6** | **.8** |
| 1988† | L.A. Lakers | 8 | 0 | **4.3** | **.200** | – | .333 | **.8** | .0 | **.1** | .4 | .4 |
| Career | | 21 | 0 | 3.4 | .188 | – | .556 | .6 | .0 | .0 | .5 | .5 |
