= Michael Cooper =

American basketball coach and former player (born 1956)

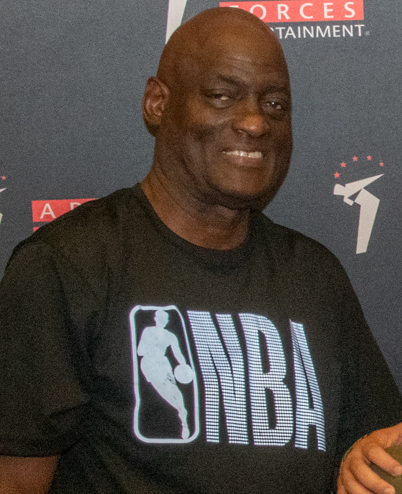
- Cooper at Camp Lemonnier in 2023

Cal State Los Angeles Golden Eagles
- Title: Head coach
- League: CCAA

Personal information
- Born: April 15, 1956 (age 70) Los Angeles, California, U.S.
- Listed height: 6 ft 7 in (2.01 m)
- Listed weight: 170 lb (77 kg)

Career information
- High school: Pasadena (Pasadena, California)
- College: Pasadena CC (1974–1976); New Mexico (1976–1978)
- NBA draft: 1978: 3rd round, 60th overall pick
- Drafted by: Los Angeles Lakers
- Playing career: 1978–1991
- Position: Shooting guard
- Number: 21
- Coaching career: 1994–present

Career history

Playing
- 1978–1990: Los Angeles Lakers
- 1990–1991: Virtus Roma

Career highlights
- As player: 5× NBA champion (1980, 1982, 1985, 1987, 1988); NBA Defensive Player of the Year (1987); 5× NBA All-Defensive First Team (1982, 1984, 1985, 1987, 1988); 3× NBA All-Defensive Second Team (1981, 1983, 1986); No. 21 retired by Los Angeles Lakers; Italian All-Star Game MVP (1991); First-team All-American – USBWA (1978); 2× First-team All-WAC (1977, 1978); As coach: 2× WNBA champion (2001, 2002); WNBA Coach of the Year (2000); NBA D–League champion (2006)

Career statistics
- Points: 7,729 (8.9 ppg)
- Assists: 3,666 (4.2 apg)
- Steals: 1,033 (1.2 spg)
- Stats at NBA.com
- Stats at Basketball Reference
- Basketball Hall of Fame

Michael Jerome Cooper (born April 15, 1956), nicknamed "Coop", is an American basketball coach and former professional player who is the head coach of the Cal State Los Angeles Golden Eagles men's basketball team. He played for the Los Angeles Lakers during his entire career in the National Basketball Association (NBA), winning five NBA championships with the Lakers during their Showtime era. He was an eight-time selection to the NBA All-Defensive Team, including five times on the first team. He was named the NBA Defensive Player of the Year in 1987. Cooper was inducted into the Naismith Memorial Basketball Hall of Fame in 2024. The Lakers retired his No. 21 jersey in 2025.

As a coach, Cooper led the Los Angeles Sparks of the Women's National Basketball Association (WNBA) to two championships and the Albuquerque Thunderbirds to one NBA G League title. He has also coached in the NBA, WNBA, and the NBA Development League. He was the head coach for boys basketball at Culver City High School in California from 2021 to 2023. He then took an assistant coaching job for men's basketball at California State University, Los Angeles. Cooper was elevated to head coach in 2026.

== Early life ==
Michael Jerome Cooper was born on April 15, 1956, in Los Angeles, California. When he was three years old, he cut one of his knees severely, requiring 100 stitches to close. At the time the doctor said that he would never be able to walk. Cooper attended Pasadena High School, where he excelled in basketball. He graduated in 1974.

== College career ==
Cooper attended Pasadena City College before transferring to the University of New Mexico. He played for the New Mexico Lobos for two seasons, 1976–78, and was named first team All-Western Athletic Conference. In Cooper's senior season, he was named a first-team All-American by the United States Basketball Writers Association. The Lobos won the WAC title, with Cooper averaging 16.3 points, 5.7 rebounds, and 4.2 assists per game.

== Professional career ==
=== Los Angeles Lakers (1978–1990) ===
Selected by the Los Angeles Lakers in the third round of the 1978 NBA draft with the 60th overall pick, Cooper became an integral part of their Showtime teams of the 1980s with his defensive skills. In a twelve-year career, he was named to the NBA All Defensive Team eight times, including five first-team selections. Until 2024, Cooper and Norm Van Lier had the most defensive selections of any player to not be inducted into the Naismith Basketball Hall of Fame. He was named a finalist in 2022 and was selected for induction into the Hall of Fame in 2024. He won the NBA Defensive Player of the Year Award in 1987. He, along with Kareem Abdul-Jabbar and Magic Johnson, was a member of five Lakers championship teams in 1980, 1982, 1985, 1987, and 1988.

At 6 ft 7 in (2.01 m), 174 lb (77 kg), the rail-thin Cooper known for his knee-high socks, played shooting guard, small forward, and point guard, although his defensive assignment was usually the other team's best shooter at the 2 or 3 position. Larry Bird has said that Cooper was the best defender he faced. For his career, Cooper averaged 8.9 points, 4.2 assists, 3.2 rebounds, 1.2 steals, and 0.6 blocks per game. A popular player among Lakers fans, home crowds were known to chant, "Coooooooop" whenever he controlled the ball, and the Lakers sometimes ran an alley-oop play for him that was dubbed the "Coop-a-loop." Leaving the team after the 1989–90 season, he was ranked among the club's all-time top 10 in three-point field goals (428), games played (873), total minutes played (23,635), steals (1033), blocked shots (523), assists (3,666), defensive rebounds (2,028), offensive rebounds (741), and free throw percentage (.833).

=== Pallacanestro Virtus Roma (1990–1991) ===
Cooper then played for the 1990–91 season in Italy for Pallacanestro Virtus Roma in the Italian Serie A, averaging 15.8 points, 6.1 rebounds, 1.9 steals, 1.8 assists, and 0.3 blocks per game.

== Coaching career ==
=== Los Angeles Lakers (1994–1997) ===
Following Cooper's playing career, he served as Special Assistant to Lakers' general manager Jerry West for three years before joining the Lakers' coaching staff in March 1994 under Magic Johnson, then with Del Harris from 1994 to 1996.

=== Los Angeles Sparks (1999–2004) ===
Cooper became an assistant coach of the WNBA's Los Angeles Sparks in 1999, and helped the team reach the playoffs for the first time in franchise history, with a record of 20–12.

He was named the Sparks' head coach in November 1999, and the Sparks' record quickly improved, as they finished 28–4 in their 2000 campaign. Cooper was named the WNBA Coach of the Year for his efforts. The Sparks followed with consecutive WNBA Championships in 2001 and 2002, but were denied a third straight WNBA title by losing to the Detroit Shock in 2003.

=== Denver Nuggets (2004–2005) ===
After the Sacramento Monarchs ended the Sparks' run in the first round of the 2004 WNBA Playoffs, Cooper took a job as an assistant coach under Jeff Bzdelik with the Denver Nuggets. After 24 games, Bzedlik was fired, and Cooper was named the Nuggets' interim head coach. He remained interim head coach until George Karl was brought in to coach the team about a month later and served as a scout for the Nuggets the remainder of the season.

=== Albuquerque Thunderbirds (2005–2007) ===
Cooper was the head coach of the Albuquerque Thunderbirds for three years (2005–07). In 2007, he left the Thunderbirds after coaching them to the National Basketball Association D- League Championship in 2006.

=== Return to Sparks (2007–2009) ===
Cooper then returned to coaching in the WNBA as head coach of the Los Angeles Sparks.

=== USC Trojans' women's basketball team (2009–2013) ===
In May 2009, Cooper was named head coach of the University of Southern California's Women of Troy Basketball Team. He quit in 2013 after USC went 11–20 and finished seventh in the Pac-12 Conference with a 7–11 record. He was 72–57 overall at USC.

=== Atlanta Dream (2014–2017) ===
In November 2013, Cooper was hired by the Atlanta Dream as head coach. His contract was not renewed by Atlanta after an 11–22 season in 2017.

=== Chadwick (2019–2021) ===
In 2018, Cooper signed on to coach 3's Company of the Big3 League.

In 2019, Cooper was named the boys varsity coach at Chadwick School in the Palos Verdes Peninsula of Los Angeles County.

=== Culver City (2021–2023) ===
Cooper became the head coach at Culver City High School on September 8, 2021.

=== California State University, Los Angeles ===
Cooper became an assistant head coach of men's basketball at Cal State, LA in 2023. On April 8, 2026, Cooper was announced as head coach.

== Head coaching record ==
=== NBA ===
Legend
Regular season	G	Games coached	W	Games won	L	Games lost	W–L %	Win–loss %
Playoffs	PG	Playoff games	PW	Playoff wins	PL	Playoff losses	PW–L %	Playoff win–loss %

Team	Year	G	W	L	W–L%	Finish	PG	PW	PL	PW–L%	Result
Denver	2004–05	14	4	10	.286	(interim)	—	—	—	—	—
Career		14	4	10	.286		—	—	—	—	

=== WNBA ===
Legend
Regular season	G	Games coached	W	Games won	L	Games lost	W–L %	Win–loss %
Playoffs	PG	Playoff games	PW	Playoff wins	PL	Playoff losses	PW–L %	Playoff win–loss %

Team	Year	G	W	L	W–L%	Finish	PG	PW	PL	PW–L%	Result
Los Angeles	2000	32	28	4	.875	1st in Western	4	2	2	.500	Lost in Conference Finals
Los Angeles	2001	32	28	4	.875	1st in Western	7	6	1	.857	Won WNBA Championship
Los Angeles	2002	32	25	7	.781	1st in Western	6	6	0	1.000	Won WNBA Championship
Los Angeles	2003	34	24	10	.706	1st in Western	9	5	4	.556	Lost WNBA Finals
Los Angeles	2004	20	14	6	.700	(resigned)	—	—	—	—	—
Los Angeles	2007	34	10	24	.294	6th in Western	—	—	—	—	—
Los Angeles	2008	34	20	14	.588	3rd in Western	6	3	3	.500	Lost in Conference Finals
Los Angeles	2009	34	18	16	.529	3rd in Western	6	3	3	.500	Lost in Conference Finals
Atlanta	2014	34	19	15	.559	1st in Eastern	3	1	2	.333	Lost First Round
Atlanta	2015	34	15	19	.441	5th in Eastern	—	—	—	—	—
Atlanta	2016	34	17	17	.500	4th in Eastern	2	1	1	.500	Lost Second Round
Atlanta	2017	34	12	22	.353	5th in Eastern	—	—	—	—	—
Career		388	230	158	.593		43	27	16	.628	

=== D-League ===
Legend
Regular season	G	Games coached	W	Games won	L	Games lost	W–L %	Win–loss %
Playoffs	PG	Playoff games	PW	Playoff wins	PL	Playoff losses	PW–L %	Playoff win–loss %

Team	Year	G	W	L	W–L%	Finish	PG	PW	PL	PW–L%	Result
Albuquerque	2005–06	48	26	22	.542	2nd	2	2	0	1.000	Won D-League Championship
Albuquerque	2006–07	50	24	26	.480	3rd in Western	1	0	1	.000	Lost in First Round
Career		98	50	48	.510		2	2	1	.667	

=== College ===
==== Women ====
Record table
Season	Team	Overall	Conference	Standing	Postseason
USC Trojans (Pacific-10/Pac-12 Conference) (2009–2013)
2009–10	USC	19–12	12–6	3rd	
2010–11	USC	24–13	10–8	T–4th	WNIT Runner-Up
2011–12	USC	18–12	12–6	3rd	
2012–13	USC	11–20	7–11	7th	
USC:		72–57	41–31		
Total:		72–57			

==== Men ====
Record table
Season	Team	Overall	Conference	Standing	Postseason
Cal State Los Angeles Golden Eagles (California Collegiate Athletic Association) (2026–present)
2026–27	Cal State Los Angeles	0–0	0–0		
Cal State Los Angeles:		0–0	0–0		
Total:		0–0			

== NBA career statistics ==
Legend
GP	Games played	GS	Games started	MPG	Minutes per game
FG%	Field goal percentage	3P%	3-point field goal percentage	FT%	Free throw percentage
RPG	Rebounds per game	APG	Assists per game	SPG	Steals per game
BPG	Blocks per game	PPG	Points per game	**Bold**	Career high
†	Won an NBA championship

=== Regular season ===
Year	Team	GP	GS	MPG	FG%	3P%	FT%	RPG	APG	SPG	BPG	PPG
1978–79	L.A. Lakers	3		2.3	.500			0.0	0.0	0.3	0.0	2.0
1979–80†	L.A. Lakers	**82**		24.1	.524	.250	.776	2.8	2.7	1.0	0.5	8.8
1980–81	L.A. Lakers	81		**32.4**	.491	.211	.785	**4.1**	4.1	**1.6**	**1.0**	9.4
1981–82†	L.A. Lakers	76	14	28.9	.517	.118	.813	3.5	3.0	**1.6**	0.8	**11.9**
1982–83	L.A. Lakers	**82**	3	26.2	**.535**	.238	.785	3.3	3.8	1.4	0.6	7.8
1983–84	L.A. Lakers	**82**	9	29.1	.497	.314	.838	3.2	**5.9**	1.4	0.8	9.0
1984–85†	L.A. Lakers	**82**	20	26.7	.465	.285	.865	3.1	5.2	1.1	0.6	8.6
1985–86	L.A. Lakers	**82**	15	27.7	.452	**.387**	.865	3.0	5.7	1.1	0.5	9.2
1986–87†	L.A. Lakers	**82**	2	27.5	.438	.385	.851	3.1	4.5	1.0	0.5	10.5
1987–88†	L.A. Lakers	61	8	29.4	.392	.320	.858	3.7	4.7	1.1	0.4	8.7
1988–89	L.A. Lakers	80	13	24.3	.431	.381	.871	2.4	3.9	0.9	0.4	7.3
1989–90	L.A. Lakers	80	10	23.1	.387	.318	**.883**	2.8	2.7	0.8	0.5	6.4
Career		873	94	27.1	.469	.340	.833	3.2	4.2	1.2	0.6	8.9

=== Playoffs ===
Year	Team	GP	GS	MPG	FG%	3P%	FT%	RPG	APG	SPG	BPG	PPG
1980†	L.A. Lakers	16		29.0	.407	.000	.861	3.7	3.6	1.5	0.7	9.1
1981	L.A. Lakers	3		34.0	.550	.000	.714	3.3	2.3	**2.0**	0.0	10.7
1982†	L.A. Lakers	14		27.4	**.565**	**.500**	.735	**4.4**	4.4	1.7	0.8	11.9
1983	L.A. Lakers	15		30.2	.465	.143	.829	3.9	2.9	1.7	0.4	9.4
1984	L.A. Lakers	21		**34.4**	.461	.333	.806	3.9	**5.7**	1.1	**1.0**	11.3
1985†	L.A. Lakers	19		26.4	.563	.308	**.923**	4.0	4.9	1.1	0.5	10.4
1986	L.A. Lakers	14		30.1	.470	.463	.818	3.3	4.9	1.3	0.3	9.7
1987†	L.A. Lakers	18		29.0	.484	.486	.852	3.3	5.0	1.4	0.8	**13.0**
1988†	L.A. Lakers	**24**		24.5	.412	.403	.741	2.4	2.8	0.8	0.4	6.4
1989	L.A. Lakers	15		27.6	.416	.382	.833	2.7	4.7	0.6	0.5	7.7
1990	L.A. Lakers	9		19.2	.286	.250		2.7	2.8	0.8	0.4	2.6
Career		168	4	28.2	.468	.392	.825	3.4	4.2	1.2	0.6	9.4

== Personal life ==
In July 2014, Cooper was diagnosed with early-stage tongue cancer. He had surgery at Winship Cancer Institute of Emory University in Atlanta, and was able to recuperate.

== See also ==
- List of NBA players who have spent their entire career with one franchise
