= 1982 NBA Finals =

1982 basketball championship series

| Team | Coach | Wins |
|---|---|---|
| Los Angeles Lakers | Pat Riley | 4 |
| Philadelphia 76ers | Billy Cunningham | 2 |
- Dates: May 27–June 8
- MVP: Magic Johnson (Los Angeles Lakers)
- Hall of Famers: Lakers: Kareem Abdul-Jabbar (1995); Michael Cooper (2024); Magic Johnson (2002); Bob McAdoo (2000); Jamaal Wilkes (2012); 76ers: Maurice Cheeks (2018); Julius Erving (1993); Bobby Jones (2019); Coaches: Billy Cunningham (1986, player); Pat Riley (2008); Officials: Hugh Evans (2022); Darell Garretson (2016); Earl Strom (1995)
- Eastern finals: 76ers defeated Celtics, 4–3
- Western finals: Lakers defeated Spurs, 4–0

The 1982 NBA World Championship Series was the championship round of the National Basketball Association (NBA)'s 1981–82 season, the top level of competition in men's professional basketball in North America. The series saw the Western Conference champion Los Angeles Lakers face the Eastern Conference champion Philadelphia 76ers. It was a rematch of the 1980 NBA Finals. The Lakers won in six games, as they did in the teams' 1980 Finals matchup, and won their eighth championship.

The 1982 NBA Finals documentary "Something to Prove" recaps all the action of this series. It was the last NBA video documentary to exclusively use film in all on-court action. Dick Stockton narrated the documentary, with the condensed USA Network version narrated by Al Albert.

This was the first Finals to be claimed on the winning team's home court since 1977. The series ended June 8, later than any previous NBA Finals. The previous record was June 7, 1978. This record was eclipsed two years later when the finals ended on June 12, 1984.

== Background ==
=== Los Angeles Lakers ===
The Lakers were stunned in the 1981 NBA playoffs by the Houston Rockets in a 3-game mini-series. The previous season saw the Lakers in a state of uncertainty, after Magic Johnson missed 45 games due to a knee injury. Their problems continued early in the new season, and with the team at 7–4 the Lakers decided to fire head coach Paul Westhead. Taking over as head coach was Pat Riley, and his promotion to the job led to the birth of the Showtime offense.

With a healthy Johnson and the additions of Kurt Rambis and Bob McAdoo, the Lakers rallied to finish with a 57–25 record, best in the Western Conference. They were even more flawless in the playoffs as they both swept the Phoenix Suns in the Western Conference semifinals, and the San Antonio Spurs in the Western Conference finals.

=== Philadelphia 76ers ===
Like the Lakers, the 76ers were coming off a heartbreaking playoff defeat, as they blew a 3–1 lead and lost to the eventual champion Boston Celtics in the Eastern Conference finals. Not much was changed for the 76ers roster-wise and record-wise in the new season, however, as the team finished second behind the Celtics in the Atlantic Division for the third straight year.

Due to a then-existing rule where division winners would earn a first-round bye, the 76ers were forced to play a best-of-three miniseries, even though their 58–24 record was three games better than the Central Division champion Milwaukee Bucks. Nevertheless, Philadelphia easily swept the Atlanta Hawks 2–0 in the first round, then ousted the Bucks in the next round 4–2. In the Eastern Conference finals, the 76ers blew out the Celtics twice at The Spectrum to take a 3–1 lead, only to lose the next two games in a harrowing replay of the 1981 playoffs. But led by Andrew Toney's 34 points, the 76ers exorcised the demons of 1981 by blowing out the Celtics 120–106 in Game 7. As time wound down, the Boston Garden crowd began to chant "Beat L.A.!", encouraging the 76ers to defeat the hated Lakers in the championship round.

=== Road to the Finals ===
| Los Angeles Lakers (Western Conference champion) | | Philadelphia 76ers (Eastern Conference champion) |
|---|---|---|
| # / Western Conference; # / Team / W / L / PCT / GB; 1 / c-Los Angeles Lakers / 57 / 25 / .695 / –; 2 / y-San Antonio Spurs / 48 / 34 / .585 / 9; 3 / x-Seattle SuperSonics / 52 / 30 / .634 / 5; 4 / x-Denver Nuggets / 46 / 36 / .561 / 11; 5 / x-Phoenix Suns / 46 / 36 / .561 / 11; 6 / x-Houston Rockets / 46 / 36 / .561 / 11; 7 / Golden State Warriors / 45 / 37 / .549 / 12; 8 / Portland Trail Blazers / 42 / 40 / .512 / 15; 9 / Kansas City Kings / 30 / 52 / .366 / 27; 10 / Dallas Mavericks / 28 / 54 / .341 / 29; 11 / Utah Jazz / 25 / 57 / .305 / 32; 12 / San Diego Clippers / 17 / 65 / .207 / 40; 1st seed in the West, 3rd best league record | Regular season | # / Eastern Conference; # / Team / W / L / PCT / GB; 1 / z-Boston Celtics / 63 / 19 / .768 / –; 2 / y-Milwaukee Bucks / 55 / 27 / .671 / 8; 3 / x-Philadelphia 76ers / 58 / 24 / .707 / 5; 4 / x-New Jersey Nets / 44 / 38 / .537 / 19; 5 / x-Washington Bullets / 43 / 39 / .524 / 20; 6 / x-Atlanta Hawks / 42 / 40 / .512 / 21; 7 / Detroit Pistons / 39 / 43 / .476 / 24; 8 / Indiana Pacers / 35 / 47 / .427 / 28; 9 / Chicago Bulls / 34 / 48 / .415 / 29; 10 / New York Knicks / 33 / 49 / .402 / 30; 11 / Cleveland Cavaliers / 15 / 67 / .183 / 48; 3rd seed in the East, 2nd best league record |
| Earned first-round bye | First round | Defeated the (6) Atlanta Hawks, 2–0 |
| Defeated the (5) Phoenix Suns, 4–0 | Conference semifinals | Defeated the (2) Milwaukee Bucks, 4–2 |
| Defeated the (2) San Antonio Spurs, 4–0 | Conference finals | Defeated the (1) Boston Celtics, 4–3 |

=== Regular season series ===
Both teams split the two meetings, each won by the home team:

February 26, 1982

Philadelphia 76ers 114, Los Angeles Lakers 116 (2OT)

The Forum, Los Angeles, California

March 7, 1982

Los Angeles Lakers 113, Philadelphia 76ers 119

The Spectrum, Philadelphia, Pennsylvania

== Series summary ==
| Game | Date | Home team | Result | Road team |
|---|---|---|---|---|
| Game 1 | May 27 | Philadelphia 76ers | 117–124 (0–1) | Los Angeles Lakers |
| Game 2 | May 30 | Philadelphia 76ers | 110–94 (1–1) | Los Angeles Lakers |
| Game 3 | June 1 | Los Angeles Lakers | 129–108 (2–1) | Philadelphia 76ers |
| Game 4 | June 3 | Los Angeles Lakers | 111–101 (3–1) | Philadelphia 76ers |
| Game 5 | June 6 | Philadelphia 76ers | 135–102 (2–3) | Los Angeles Lakers |
| Game 6 | June 8 | Los Angeles Lakers | 114–104 (4–2) | Philadelphia 76ers |

== Game summaries ==
=== Game 1 ===
CBS

May 27
9:05 p.m. EDT

Los Angeles Lakers 124, Philadelphia 76ers 117
Scoring by quarter: 30–32, 20–29, 41–28, 33–28
| Pts: Nixon, Wilkes 24 each Rebs: Magic Johnson 14; Asts: Norm Nixon 10 | Pts: Julius Erving 27; Rebs: Caldwell Jones 11; Asts: Cheeks, Toney 9 each |
Los Angeles leads the series, 1–0

The Spectrum, Philadelphia, Pennsylvania
Attendance: 18,364
Referees:
- No. 11 Jake O'Donnell
- No. 25 Hugh Evans

Fresh from holding off the Celtics in the conference finals, the Sixers worked their offense to precision and held a 15-point lead midway through the third quarter 83–68. But, then, the Lakers began to turn it up on defense and the result was many fast breaks. The Lakers went on a 40–9 run over the game's next 11 minutes. Wilkes scored 10, Kareem and McAdoo scored 8 each, Nixon and Cooper scored 7 each, and Nixon had 4 assists during the run, on the way to a 124-117 Game 1 win, thereby stealing the home-court advantage.

After the game, Sixers coach Billy Cunningham commented that the Sixers weren't affected that much by the trapping Laker defense, just cold shooting and sloppy play. However, he also questioned whether or not it was a "zone defense", which was illegal at the time.

=== Game 2 ===
CBS

May 30
3:35 p.m. EDT

Los Angeles Lakers 94, Philadelphia 76ers 110
Scoring by quarter: 26–34, 21–23, 29–31, 18–22
| Pts: Kareem Abdul-Jabbar 23; Rebs: Magic Johnson 11; Asts: Norm Nixon 10 | Pts: Julius Erving 24; Rebs: Julius Erving 14; Asts: Andrew Toney 11 |
Series tied, 1–1

The Spectrum, Philadelphia, Pennsylvania
Attendance: 18,364
Referees:
- No. 10 Darell Garretson
- No. 12 Earl Strom

In this game, Laker coach Pat Riley took a different defensive approach, assigning Magic Johnson to cover Julius Erving straight-up on defense. While Magic couldn't match the Doctor's athleticism, the move did keep Erving from the offensive boards.

In Game 2 that wasn't quite enough, as Erving brought the Sixers back with 24 points and 16 rebounds, mostly defensive. Billy Cunningham used all his centers, Caldwell Jones, Darryl Dawkins and Earl Cureton at different points to guard Kareem Abdul-Jabbar. The Sixers got 38 offensive rebounds for 50 second-chance points, while the Lakers only had six offensive boards.

The Sixers used that advantage to take a 110–94 win that evened the series. In a balanced scoring attack, Maurice Cheeks had 19 points and eight assists, Jones added 12 points and 11 rebounds, and Bobby Jones and Clint Richardson each scored 10. This was the Lakers first loss in the 1982 post season.

=== Game 3 ===
CBS

June 1
6:05 p.m. PDT

Philadelphia 76ers 108, Los Angeles Lakers 129
Scoring by quarter: 20–32, 28–28, 22–31, 38–38
| Pts: Andrew Toney 36; Rebs: Darryl Dawkins 13; Asts: Maurice Cheeks 9 | Pts: Norm Nixon 29; Rebs: Magic Johnson 9 Asts: Magic Johnson 8 |
Los Angeles leads the series, 2–1

The Forum, Inglewood, California
Attendance: 17,505
Referees:
- No. 4 Ed Rush
- No. 16 Wally Rooney

Back at home at The Forum, the Lakers completely dominated Game 3. Norm Nixon scored 29 points as the Lakers marched to a 129–108 victory. Andrew Toney scored 36 and Julius Erving 21, but no one else came through.

=== Game 4 ===
CBS

June 3
6:05 p.m. PDT

Philadelphia 76ers 101, Los Angeles Lakers 111
Scoring by quarter: 18–29, 24–28, 30–30, 29–24
| Pts: Andrew Toney 28; Rebs: B. Jones 9 Asts: Andrew Toney 11 | Pts: Johnson, Wilkes 24 each Rebs: Abdul-Jabbar, Rambis 11 each Asts: Norm Nixon 14 |
Los Angeles leads the series, 3–1

The Forum, Inglewood, California
Attendance: 17,505
Referees:
- No. 14 Jack Madden
- No. 22 Paul Mihalak

The Lakers controlled the tempo in Game 4 by going to their half-court game, passing down low to Kareem Abdul-Jabbar. On the defensive end, they kept up the pressure with their zone trap. The Lakers went up, three games to one, with a 111–101 win. Jamaal Wilkes and Magic Johnson had 24 points each, while Abdul-Jabbar added 22 and Bob McAdoo 19 off the bench. Hard-charging bruiser Kurt Rambis pulled down 11 rebounds, matching Abdul-Jabbar's output.

=== Game 5 ===
CBS

June 6
3:35 p.m. EDT

Los Angeles Lakers 102, Philadelphia 76ers 135
Scoring by quarter: 20–20, 34–34, 27–37, 21–44
| Pts: Bob McAdoo 23; Rebs: Magic Johnson 10; Asts: Norm Nixon 13 | Pts: Andrew Toney 31; Rebs: Julius Erving 12; Asts: Toney, Cheeks 8 each |
Los Angeles leads the series, 3–2

The Spectrum, Philadelphia, Pennsylvania
Attendance: 18,364
Referees:
- No. 11 Jake O'Donnell
- No. 4 Ed Rush

Back in Philadelphia, the Sixers took out their frustrations and destroyed the Lakers, 135–102. Kareem Abdul-Jabbar was held to just six points, a career playoff low, thanks to the spirited defense of Darryl Dawkins. In the midst of the offensive explosion, Dawkins also contributed 20 points and seven rebounds to the effort.

This was the Lakers' most lopsided playoff defeat up to this time. It was eclipsed when they were routed 148–114 by the Celtics in Game 1 of the 1985 Finals. Coincidentally, the Lakers also won that series in six games despite the blowout loss.

=== Game 6 ===
CBS

June 8
6:05 p.m. PDT

Philadelphia 76ers 104, Los Angeles Lakers 114
Scoring by quarter: 26–30, 31–36, 22–20, 25–28
| Pts: Julius Erving 30; Rebs: C. Jones 9 Asts: Maurice Cheeks 9 | Pts: Jamaal Wilkes 27; Rebs: Magic Johnson 13; Asts: Magic Johnson 13 |
Los Angeles wins the series, 4–2

The Forum, Inglewood, California
Attendance: 17,505
Referees:
- No. 10 Darell Garretson
- No. 14 Jack Madden

The Sixers' strong showing in Game 5 gave them hope for Game 6 in the Forum, but the Lakers got the early lead and were up, 66–57, at the half.

In the third period, the Sixers' defense turned it up a notch. They held Los Angeles to 20 points for the quarter and several times cut the lead to one point. Super-sub Bob McAdoo, known more for his offense, made a key defensive play late in the third when he blocked a Julius Erving layup on a breakaway that would have given the Sixers the lead.

The Lakers came back and surged early in the fourth period to boost their lead to 11. Erving, who led all scorers with 30 points, and Andrew Toney, who had 29, responded by trimming the lead to 103–100 with about four minutes left, but then Kareem Abdul-Jabbar scored and was fouled and made the free throw to put Los Angeles up by six. Moments later, Wilkes got a breakaway layup to close it out, 114–104.

Jamaal Wilkes led the Lakers with 27 points, and Magic Johnson, with 13 points, 13 rebounds and 13 assists, was named the series MVP. McAdoo, who had 16 points, nine rebounds and three blocks, was pretty much reborn as a player in this series after being cast off by several teams as a selfish, non-team player.

Aside from the Doctor's and Toney's efforts, no one else stepped up for the Sixers. Darryl Dawkins fouled out and only had 10 points and one rebound in 20 minutes played. Dawkins would soon be shipped to the New Jersey Nets, and the 76ers acquired the final piece of their championship puzzle: Moses Malone, an MVP center from the Houston Rockets.

== Team rosters ==
=== Los Angeles Lakers ===
1981–82 Los Angeles Lakers roster
Players

| Pos. | No. | Player | Height | Weight | DOB | From |
|---|---|---|---|---|---|---|
| C | 33 | Kareem Abdul-Jabbar | 7 ft 2 in (2.18 m) | 225 lb (102 kg) | 1947–04–16 | UCLA |
| F | 8 | Jim Brewer | 6 ft 9 in (2.06 m) | 210 lb (95 kg) | 1951–12–03 | Minnesota |
| G | 21 | Michael Cooper | 6 ft 5 in (1.96 m) | 170 lb (77 kg) | 1956–04–15 | New Mexico |
| G | 34 | Clay Johnson | 6 ft 4 in (1.93 m) | 175 lb (79 kg) | 1956–07–18 | Missouri |
| G | 32 | Magic Johnson | 6 ft 9 in (2.06 m) | 215 lb (98 kg) | 1959–08–14 | Michigan State |
| G | 15 | Eddie Jordan | 6 ft 1 in (1.85 m) | 170 lb (77 kg) | 1955–01–29 | Rutgers |
| F | 25 | Mitch Kupchak | 6 ft 9 in (2.06 m) | 230 lb (104 kg) | 1954–05–24 | North Carolina |
| F | 54 | Mark Landsberger | 6 ft 8 in (2.03 m) | 225 lb (102 kg) | 1955–05–21 | Arizona State |
| C | 11 | Bob McAdoo | 6 ft 9 in (2.06 m) | 210 lb (95 kg) | 1951–09–25 | North Carolina |
| F | 40 | Mike McGee | 6 ft 5 in (1.96 m) | 190 lb (86 kg) | 1959–07–29 | Michigan |
| G | 30 | Kevin McKenna | 6 ft 5 in (1.96 m) | 195 lb (88 kg) | 1959–01–08 | Creighton |
| G | 10 | Norm Nixon | 6 ft 2 in (1.88 m) | 170 lb (77 kg) | 1955–10–11 | Duquesne |
| F | 31 | Kurt Rambis | 6 ft 8 in (2.03 m) | 213 lb (97 kg) | 1958–02–25 | Santa Clara |
| F | 52 | Jamaal Wilkes | 6 ft 6 in (1.98 m) | 190 lb (86 kg) | 1953–05–02 | UCLA |

Coaches
Head coach
- (United States) Paul Westhead (Saint Joseph's) (first 11 games)
- (United States) Pat Riley (Kentucky)
Assistant(s)
- (United States) Bill Bertka (Kent State)
- (United States) Mike Thibault (St. Martin's)

Legend
- (DP) Unsigned draft pick
- (FA) Free agent
- (S) Suspended
- Injured

=== Philadelphia 76ers ===
1981–82 Philadelphia 76ers roster
Players

| Pos. | No. | Player | Height | Weight | DOB | From |
|---|---|---|---|---|---|---|
| F | 42 | Mike Bantom | 6 ft 9 in (2.06 m) | 200 lb (91 kg) | 1951–12–03 | Saint Joseph's |
| G | 10 | Maurice Cheeks | 6 ft 1 in (1.85 m) | 180 lb (82 kg) | 1956–09–08 | West Texas A&M |
| F | 25 | Earl Cureton | 6 ft 9 in (2.06 m) | 210 lb (95 kg) | 1957–09–03 | Detroit Mercy |
| C | 53 | Darryl Dawkins | 6 ft 11 in (2.11 m) | 251 lb (114 kg) | 1957–01–11 | Maynard Evans (HS) |
| G | 14 | Franklin Edwards | 6 ft 1 in (1.85 m) | 170 lb (77 kg) | 1959–02–02 | Cleveland State |
| F | 6 | Julius Erving | 6 ft 7 in (2.01 m) | 210 lb (95 kg) | 1950–02–22 | UMass |
| G | 9 | Lionel Hollins | 6 ft 3 in (1.91 m) | 185 lb (84 kg) | 1953–10–19 | Arizona State |
| F | 18 | Ollie Johnson | 6 ft 6 in (1.98 m) | 200 lb (91 kg) | 1949–05–11 | Temple |
| F | 24 | Bobby Jones | 6 ft 9 in (2.06 m) | 210 lb (95 kg) | 1951–12–18 | North Carolina |
| C | 11 | Caldwell Jones | 6 ft 11 in (2.11 m) | 217 lb (98 kg) | 1950–08–04 | Albany State |
| G | 4 | Clint Richardson | 6 ft 3 in (1.91 m) | 195 lb (88 kg) | 1956–08–07 | Seattle |
| F | 23 | Steve Mix | 6 ft 7 in (2.01 m) | 215 lb (98 kg) | 1947–12–30 | Toledo |
| G | 22 | Andrew Toney | 6 ft 3 in (1.91 m) | 178 lb (81 kg) | 1957–11–23 | Louisiana |

Coaches
Head coach
- (United States) Billy Cunningham (North Carolina)
Assistant(s)
- (United States) Jack McMahon (St. John's)

Legend
- (DP) Unsigned draft pick
- (FA) Free agent
- (S) Suspended
- Injured

== Player statistics ==
Legend
| GP | Games played | GS | Games started | MPG | Minutes per game |
| FG% | Field-goal percentage | 3P% | 3-point field-goal percentage | FT% | Free-throw percentage |
| RPG | Rebounds per game | APG | Assists per game | SPG | Steals per game |
| BPG | Blocks per game | PPG | Points per game |

Los Angeles Lakers

Los Angeles Lakers statistics
| Player | GP | GS | MPG | FG% | 3P% | FT% | RPG | APG | SPG | BPG | PPG |
|---|---|---|---|---|---|---|---|---|---|---|---|
| Bob McAdoo | 6 | 0 | 27.5 | .569 | .000 | .667 | 5.0 | 0.8 | 1.0 | 2.3 | 16.3 |
| Kareem Abdul-Jabbar | 6 | 6 | 35.3 | .531 | .000 | .537 | 7.7 | 3.8 | 1.3 | 3.2 | 18.0 |
| Jamaal Wilkes | 6 | 6 | 39.0 | .435 | .000 | .750 | 5.8 | 2.8 | 1.5 | 0.0 | 19.7 |
| Norm Nixon | 6 | 6 | 39.3 | .441 | .000 | .727 | 3.7 | 10.0 | 1.7 | 0.2 | 17.7 |
| Michael Cooper | 6 | 0 | 27.0 | .561 | .500 | .750 | 4.7 | 3.7 | 1.3 | 0.3 | 13.3 |
| Kurt Rambis | 6 | 6 | 20.0 | .513 | .000 | .467 | 6.5 | 1.2 | 1.0 | 0.5 | 7.8 |
| Mark Landsberger | 4 | 0 | 7.8 | .286 | .000 | .000 | 3.8 | 0.3 | 0.0 | 0.5 | 1.0 |
| Magic Johnson | 6 | 6 | 41.7 | .533 | .000 | .846 | 10.8 | 8.0 | 2.5 | 0.3 | 16.2 |
| Clay Johnson | 3 | 0 | 5.0 | .333 | .000 | .000 | 0.3 | 0.0 | 0.3 | 0.0 | 0.7 |
| Mike McGee | 2 | 0 | 2.5 | .455 | .000 | .000 | 1.0 | 0.0 | 0.0 | 0.0 | 5.0 |
| Jim Brewer | 2 | 0 | 2.5 | 1.000 | .000 | .000 | 0.5 | 0.0 | 0.0 | 0.5 | 2.0 |
| Eddie Jordan | 2 | 0 | 2.5 | .000 | .000 | .000 | 0.0 | 2.5 | 0.5 | 0.0 | 0.0 |

Philadelphia 76ers

Philadelphia 76ers statistics
| Player | GP | GS | MPG | FG% | 3P% | FT% | RPG | APG | SPG | BPG | PPG |
|---|---|---|---|---|---|---|---|---|---|---|---|
| Andrew Toney | 6 | 6 | 37.8 | .529 | .750 | .862 | 2.7 | 7.8 | 1.2 | 0.0 | 26.0 |
| Darryl Dawkins | 6 | 0 | 20.2 | .564 | .000 | .550 | 5.0 | 0.2 | 0.3 | 2.0 | 12.2 |
| Maurice Cheeks | 6 | 6 | 37.2 | .429 | .000 | .762 | 2.5 | 8.7 | 2.0 | 0.2 | 14.7 |
| Bobby Jones | 6 | 6 | 31.0 | .560 | .000 | .619 | 6.2 | 2.7 | 0.2 | 1.0 | 11.5 |
| Lionel Hollins | 3 | 0 | 11.3 | .313 | .000 | .000 | 1.0 | 4.0 | 2.3 | 0.0 | 3.3 |
| Julius Erving | 6 | 6 | 38.3 | .543 | .000 | .720 | 8.2 | 3.3 | 1.9 | 1.3 | 25.0 |
| Clint Richardson | 6 | 0 | 15.2 | .500 | .000 | .500 | 2.2 | 2.0 | 0.3 | 0.2 | 6.2 |
| Caldwell Jones | 6 | 6 | 29.5 | .372 | .000 | .571 | 7.8 | 0.8 | 0.8 | 3.0 | 6.0 |
| Earl Cureton | 3 | 0 | 7.3 | .273 | .000 | 1.000 | 0.3 | 0.7 | 0.0 | 0.0 | 2.7 |
| Mike Bantom | 6 | 0 | 18.5 | .500 | .000 | .500 | 4.3 | 0.8 | 0.8 | 0.8 | 5.3 |
| Steve Mix | 3 | 0 | 5.0 | .571 | 1.000 | 1.000 | 0.3 | 0.7 | 0.0 | 0.0 | 3.3 |
| Franklin Edwards | 1 | 0 | 3.0 | 1.000 | .000 | .000 | 0.0 | 0.0 | 0.0 | 0.0 | 6.0 |

== Television coverage ==
Unlike previous years, where weeknight games were shown on tape delay, all games in the Finals were televised live by CBS. As a compromise to CBS to allow the live telecasts, the NBA returned the start of its season to late October after starting it earlier in October the previous two seasons, meaning the finals would start after the conclusion of the mid-May sweeps period. The later date also eliminated the back-to-back games on Mother's Day weekend, which was used in 1980 and 1981 to avert another tape delay broadcast.

This was also the first of nine straight NBA finals (1982–1990) that Dick Stockton would call for CBS Sports. Stockton also announced the starting lineups of the 1982 NBA Finals in lieu of P.A. announcers Dave Zinkoff (for the 76ers) and Larry McKay (for the Lakers; McKay would be replaced the next season by Lawrence Tanter).

== Aftermath ==
Both teams would meet in the Finals again in the next year. The Sixers, bolstered by the addition of league MVP Moses Malone, won 65 games, and steamrolled through the playoffs, in which they lost only once (completing Malone's famous "Fo, Fo, Fo" prediction, stating that the Sixers needed to win 4 games in each of the three series) in route to their third NBA title overall (they won in 1955 as the Syracuse Nationals, and in 1967). The Lakers finished the regular season with 58 wins, but were overmatched by the hungrier Sixers in the Finals, and swept. Then-rookie and future Hall of Famer James Worthy did not play in the series because of a late-season leg injury.

The Lakers would win their next championship three years later over their archrival in the Boston Celtics in six games.

== See also ==
- 1982 NBA playoffs
