= 1987 NBA Finals =

1987 basketball championship series

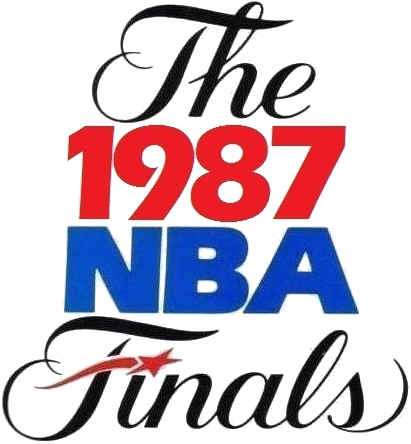
Team	Coach	Wins
Los Angeles Lakers	Pat Riley	4
Boston Celtics	K. C. Jones	2
- Dates: June 2–14
- MVP: Magic Johnson (Los Angeles Lakers)
- Hall of Famers: Celtics: Larry Bird (1998); Dennis Johnson (2010); Kevin McHale (1999); Robert Parish (2003); Bill Walton (1993); Lakers: Kareem Abdul-Jabbar (1995); Michael Cooper (2024); Magic Johnson (2002); James Worthy (2003); Coaches: K. C. Jones (1989, player); Pat Riley (2008); Officials: Hugh Evans (2022); Darell Garretson (2016); Earl Strom (1995)
- Eastern finals: Celtics defeated Pistons, 4–3
- Western finals: Lakers defeated SuperSonics, 4–0

The 1987 NBA Finals was the championship series of the National Basketball Association's (NBA) 1986–87 season, and the culmination of the season's playoffs. The Western Conference champion Los Angeles Lakers defeated the defending NBA champion and Eastern Conference champion Boston Celtics in six games to win their tenth NBA championship, becoming the second team in league history to win ten or more championships. The key moment of the series was Magic Johnson's Junior sky hook in Game 4. This was the tenth time that the Celtics and Lakers met in the NBA Finals (more than any other Finals matchup). It would be Larry Bird's last Finals appearance, as well as the Celtics' last Finals appearance until the two teams met in 2008.

This was the first NBA Championship Series conducted entirely in June. The last time there were no NBA Championship Series games in May was in the 1970–1971 season, when the finals (a four-game sweep that year) ended on April 30. It is also the first NBA Finals series to be conducted on a Sunday-Tuesday-Thursday rotation, which was in use until 1990 and revived since the 2004 NBA Finals; in between the NBA Finals were conducted on a Sunday-Wednesday-Friday rotation.

== Background ==
Much was at stake in the 1987 NBA Finals. Rivals since their days in college, Larry Bird and Magic Johnson entered the Finals each with three NBA championships. In terms of the Celtics–Lakers, each team also had won three championships in the 1980s. With the win in 1987 and the following year, the Lakers and Johnson would surpass their rival and be seen as the team and player of the 1980s.

=== Boston Celtics ===
Thanks to the 1984 trade of Gerald Henderson and the subsequent fall of the Seattle SuperSonics, at the end of 1985–86 the Celtics were not only the best team in the NBA but also owned the second pick in the 1986 NBA draft. They chose Len Bias with the pick and had high hopes that the presence of the young Maryland Terrapins star would ensure that the franchise would remain a powerhouse after Bird, McHale, and Parish retired. Unfortunately, Bias died 48 hours after being drafted, after using cocaine at a party and overdosing.

The Celtics finished the regular season with a 59–23 record, best in the Eastern Conference. Despite retaining the core of the team that won the championship a year earlier, Boston endured numerous injuries to its roster. Their bench, an asset of the previous year's team, was decimated by injuries to Scott Wedman and Bill Walton. With limited options, head coach K. C. Jones was forced to give his starting five of Larry Bird, Kevin McHale, Robert Parish, Dennis Johnson and Danny Ainge extended minutes, but the lengthy playing time took its toll on the players' health, and by the start of the playoffs, the Celtics were a roster full of walking wounded.

After sweeping the Chicago Bulls in the first round, the Celtics were pushed to a Game 7 in the next two rounds by the Milwaukee Bucks and the Detroit Pistons, only to advance each time. Still, the Celtics' health became a question mark as they entered the Finals.

=== Los Angeles Lakers ===
The Lakers finished the regular season with a league-best 65–17 record. Head coach Pat Riley made a strategical move, shifting the offensive focus to Magic Johnson. The Lakers acquired center Mychal Thompson via trade midway through the season. Both moves helped alleviate the load off of the aging Kareem Abdul-Jabbar, who turned 40 during the playoffs. A.C. Green supplanted Kurt Rambis in the starting lineup.

During the Lakers' path to the Finals they swept the Denver Nuggets in the first round, defeated the Golden State Warriors in five games during the second round, and swept the Seattle SuperSonics in the conference finals. Their only loss was a Sleepy Floyd 51-point outburst in Game 4 in Oakland, which allowed the Warriors to avoid a sweep.

This 1987 Lakers team is widely considered both Magic Johnson's best team, and one of the greatest teams in NBA history. There are many reasons for this, besides Magic Johnson being league MVP that year instead of Larry Bird: Kareem was still in late prime condition, the Lakers had many scoring options, they had a strong defense which included defensive player of the year Michael Cooper, and Mychal Thompson's elite post defense meant they had another body to throw at the likes of McHale and Parish of the Celtics.

=== Road to the Finals ===
Los Angeles Lakers (Western Conference champion)		Boston Celtics (Eastern Conference champion)
# / Western Conference; # / Team / W / L / PCT / GB; 1 / z-Los Angeles Lakers / 65 / 17 / .793 / –; 2 / y-Dallas Mavericks / 55 / 27 / .671 / 10; 3 / x-Portland Trail Blazers / 49 / 33 / .598 / 16; 4 / x-Utah Jazz / 44 / 38 / .537 / 21; 5 / x-Golden State Warriors / 42 / 40 / .512 / 23; 6 / x-Houston Rockets / 42 / 40 / .512 / 23; 7 / x-Seattle SuperSonics / 39 / 43 / .476 / 26; 8 / x-Denver Nuggets / 37 / 45 / .451 / 28; 9 / Phoenix Suns / 36 / 46 / .439 / 29; 10 / Sacramento Kings / 29 / 53 / .354 / 36; 11 / San Antonio Spurs / 28 / 54 / .341 / 37; 12 / Los Angeles Clippers / 12 / 70 / .146 / 53; 1st seed in the West, best league record	Regular season	# / Eastern Conference; # / Team / W / L / PCT / GB; 1 / c-Boston Celtics / 59 / 23 / .720 / –; 2 / y-Atlanta Hawks / 57 / 25 / .695 / 2; 3 / x-Detroit Pistons / 52 / 30 / .634 / 7; 4 / x-Milwaukee Bucks / 50 / 32 / .610 / 9; 5 / x-Philadelphia 76ers / 45 / 37 / .549 / 14; 6 / x-Washington Bullets / 42 / 40 / .512 / 17; 7 / x-Indiana Pacers / 41 / 41 / .500 / 18; 8 / x-Chicago Bulls / 40 / 42 / .488 / 19; 9 / Cleveland Cavaliers / 31 / 51 / .378 / 28; 10 / New Jersey Nets / 24 / 58 / .293 / 35; 11 / New York Knicks / 24 / 58 / .293 / 35; 1st seed in the East, 2nd best league record
Defeated the (8) Denver Nuggets, 3–0	First round	Defeated the (8) Chicago Bulls, 3–0
Defeated the (5) Golden State Warriors, 4–1	Conference semifinals	Defeated the (4) Milwaukee Bucks, 4–3
Defeated the (7) Seattle SuperSonics, 4–0	Conference finals	Defeated the (3) Detroit Pistons, 4–3

=== Regular season series ===
The Los Angeles Lakers won both games in the regular season series:

December 12, 1986

Los Angeles Lakers 117, Boston Celtics 110

Boston Garden, Boston, Massachusetts

February 15, 1987

Boston Celtics 103, Los Angeles Lakers 106

The Forum, Inglewood, California

== Series summary ==
Game	Date	Road team	Result	Home team
Game 1	June 2	Boston Celtics	113–126 (0–1)	Los Angeles Lakers
Game 2	June 4	Boston Celtics	122–141 (0–2)	Los Angeles Lakers
Game 3	June 7	Los Angeles Lakers	103–109 (2–1)	Boston Celtics
Game 4	June 9	Los Angeles Lakers	107–106 (3–1)	Boston Celtics
Game 5	June 11	Los Angeles Lakers	108–123 (3–2)	Boston Celtics
Game 6	June 14	Boston Celtics	93–106 (2–4)	Los Angeles Lakers

=== Game 1 ===
CBS

June 2
9:00 pm EDT

Boston Celtics 113, Los Angeles Lakers 126
Scoring by quarter: 26–35, 28–34, 31–32, 28–25
Pts: Larry Bird 32; Rebs: Larry Bird 7 Asts: Dennis Johnson 13	Pts: James Worthy 33; Rebs: Kareem Abdul-Jabbar 10; Asts: Magic Johnson 13
Los Angeles leads the series, 1–0

The Forum, Inglewood, California
Attendance: 17,505
Referees:
- No. 11 Jake O'Donnell
- No. 25 Hugh Evans

The Lakers were coming off a four-game sweep of the Seattle SuperSonics, while the Celtics were coming off a grueling seven-game win over the Detroit Pistons. Magic Johnson led a 126–113 victory with 29 points, 13 assists, eight rebounds and no turnovers. James Worthy, on the receiving end of many of Johnson's passes, had 33 points and nine rebounds. The Lakers ran 35 fast breaks in the first two quarters and led by 15 at intermission.

=== Game 2 ===
CBS

June 4
9:00 pm EDT

Boston Celtics 122, Los Angeles Lakers 141
Scoring by quarter: 34–38, 22–37, 36–32, 30–34
Pts: Larry Bird 23; Rebs: Robert Parish 14; Asts: Dennis Johnson 9	Pts: Byron Scott 24; Rebs: Johnson, Rambis 5 each Asts: Magic Johnson 20
Los Angeles leads the series, 2–0

The Forum, Inglewood, California
Attendance: 17,505
Referees:
- No. 4 Ed T. Rush
- No. 14 Jack Madden

Prior to the game, Isiah Thomas of the Detroit Pistons and Larry Bird held a joint press conference to quell the controversy of Dennis Rodman and Thomas racial comments towards Bird after losing Game 7 of the Eastern Conference Finals. After that game, Thomas told reporters that he agreed with teammate Dennis Rodman’s statement that Bird would be just another guy if he were black. Thomas said he meant the comment to be a joke. Thomas later stated how Bird accepting his apology essentially saved his career.

The Celtics plan for Game 2 was to concentrate on stopping Magic Johnson. Danny Ainge, at 6'5", could not deal with the 6'9" Magic. In this game, Michael Cooper emerged as a great 3 point shooter. He hit six 3 pointers, a playoff record. Kareem Abdul-Jabbar added 23 points on 10 of 14 shots, while Magic posted 20 assists and 22 points. It all added up to a 141–122 rout, Boston's sixth straight road loss in the playoffs.

=== Game 3 ===
CBS

June 7
1:00 pm EDT

Los Angeles Lakers 103, Boston Celtics 109
Scoring by quarter: 29–22, 27–38, 22–26, 25–23
Pts: Magic Johnson 32; Rebs: Magic Johnson 11; Asts: Magic Johnson 9	Pts: Larry Bird 30; Rebs: Larry Bird 12; Asts: Ainge, McHale 5 each
Los Angeles leads the series, 2–1

Boston Garden, Boston, Massachusetts
Attendance: 14,890
Referees:
- No. 10 Darrell Garretson
- No. 17 Joe Crawford

The Celtics recovered from their two knockout blows in Games 1 and 2 with a counterpunch of their own. A little-used backup center, Greg Kite, provided the spark. Kite, entering the game late in the first quarter when Robert Parish encountered foul trouble, played 20 minutes, and while he failed to score, he grabbed nine rebounds, blocked a Magic Johnson layup, and did solid body work on Kareem Abdul-Jabbar. The defensive minutes Kite gave Boston from the bench were just enough, as Larry Bird scored 30 points and Dennis Johnson hit 11 of 22 attempts from the field to finish with 26 points. The resurgent Celtics shot 17 of 21 from the floor in the second quarter.

Kevin McHale Celtics' forward bounced back in Boston with 21 points and 10 rebounds while letting the air out of James Worthy's game, limiting the Lakers' forward to only 13 points and three rebounds. Magic led the Lakers with 32 points in the 109–103 loss.

=== Game 4 ===
CBS

June 9
9:00 pm EDT

Los Angeles Lakers 107, Boston Celtics 106
Scoring by quarter: 22–29, 25–26, 31–30, 29–21
Pts: Magic Johnson 29; Rebs: Kareem Abdul-Jabbar 11; Asts: Cooper, Johnson 5 each	Pts: Kevin McHale 25; Rebs: Kevin McHale 13; Asts: Dennis Johnson 14
Los Angeles leads the series, 3–1

Boston Garden, Boston, Massachusetts
Attendance: 14,890
Referees:
- No. 12 Earl Strom
- No. 25 Hugh Evans

After their Game 3 win, Larry Bird said, "This (Game 3) was the most important game of the series for us. If we lost, it might've been tough to get up for Game 4. Now it's going to be easy."

In what would be one of, if not the greatest Finals game of all time, the Celtics took it right to the Lakers, controlling the boards and taking a 55–47 lead into halftime. The Celtics had a balanced scoring attack with Kevin McHale, Robert Parish, Danny Ainge, and Dennis Johnson all scoring in double figures. In the 3rd quarter, Bird finally got hot by scoring 12 in the quarter and helping the Celtics lead by as many as 16 points. But Los Angeles fought back to cut the Celtics lead to 85–78 going into the 4th.

In the 4th quarter the Lakers continued fighting back until they managed to tie the game at 95–95 on a Kareem Abdul-Jabbar skyhook with 5:30 remaining. The Celtics responded on both ends of the court by going on an 8–0 run, helped by good defense which led to 2 fast-break lay-ups to take a 103–96 lead with 2 minutes left. Then the Lakers called time out. On the Celtics' next possession, Robert Parish lost the ball to Michael Cooper. Cooper passed the ball ahead to Magic Johnson, who started a break. Cooper spotted up in 3-point territory, while Magic drove, forcing Cooper's defender to help out. Magic then kicked the ball out to a now wide open Cooper who drilled the three to cut the lead to 103–100.

On the Celtics next possession, Larry Bird forced a pass to Kevin McHale in the post, which instead sailed out of bounds, giving possession right back to the Lakers. James Worthy then hit a tough fade-away over Kevin McHale and Robert Parish in the lane to cut the deficit to one. On the very next possession, Bird missed a step-back jumper over the outstretched frame of Kareem Abdul-Jabbar, and the Lakers got the ball back with just under 45 seconds remaining. The Lakers called a timeout to set up a pick for Kareem Abdul-Jabbar. The pass was there for an alley-oop dunk, and the Lakers took a 104–103 lead, their first lead since early in the 1st quarter. The Celtics called timeout with 29 seconds left in the game.

Out of the timeout Bird threw the ball inbounds and was immediately face-guarded by James Worthy. In fact, Worthy had a fist-full of Bird's jersey to make sure Bird would not score. With Worthy's defense, the Celtics could not get their best player the ball and instead went through the motions of their offense until Danny Ainge got open. That forced Worthy to let go of Bird and help out on Ainge. Bird immediately got himself open by going to the 3-point line right in front of the Lakers' bench. Ainge found Bird wide open and Bird hit the three point bomb with 12 seconds left, to put Boston up 106–104 and sent the Boston Garden crowd into a frenzy.

On the next possession, Abdul-Jabbar was fouled and went to the line, where he made the first and missed the second. The officials ruled that McHale fumbled the ball out of bounds with seven seconds left.

What followed was another play for the ages. Magic set a pick on Kevin McHale, which almost opened up a lay-up for Worthy, but Dennis Johnson was able to switch over in time on help defend. However, that left McHale scrambling to guard Magic who just got open and received the inbounds pass near the left sideline. Twenty feet from the basket, Magic had the advantage on the post-defender McHale, who was also playing through a bad ankle injury. Magic dribbled, hesitated to get McHale off-balance, then drove into the paint. Magic then lofted a hook shot, which just cleared the fingertips of both McHale and Parish, and swished through the net giving the Lakers a 107–106 lead with only 2 seconds left.

The Celtics still had one last shot: Dennis inbounded the ball to Bird, who had broken to the corner. Larry, to his surprise, found himself wide open behind the 3-point line right in front of the Lakers' bench. Bird caught the inbounds pass from Johnson, turned, and put up a fall-away jumper as time expired. The shot missed as the Boston crowd let out a collective groan and the Lakers' bench danced off the court to celebrate the victory. The win gave the Lakers a commanding 3–1 series lead.

=== Game 5 ===
CBS

June 11
9:00 pm EDT

Los Angeles Lakers 108, Boston Celtics 123
Scoring by quarter: 25–25, 23–38, 29–33, 31–27
Pts: Magic Johnson 29; Rebs: Magic Johnson 8 Asts: Magic Johnson 12	Pts: Dennis Johnson 25; Rebs: Kevin McHale 14; Asts: Dennis Johnson 11
Los Angeles leads the series, 3–2

Boston Garden, Boston, Massachusetts
Attendance: 14,890
Referees:
- No. 11 Jake O'Donnell
- No. 4 Ed T. Rush

The Celtics had to win Game 5 in the Garden, and would control most of the game. Danny Ainge set the tone by nailing 5 of 6 from 3-point range to give Boston early control, including a halfcourt heave at the buzzer before halftime.

Magic countered for Los Angeles with 29 points, 12 assists, eight rebounds, and four steals, but he received little help. Before the game Bird had told his teammates, "If they want to celebrate, let's not let them do it on the parquet." The Celtics had incentive enough. They got their second win, 123–108, and the series jetted back across the continent.

This was the last NBA Finals game played at Boston Garden. When the Celtics returned to the Finals in 2008, they had moved to TD Garden, which opened in 1995.

=== Game 6 ===
CBS

June 14
3:30 pm EDT

Boston Celtics 93, Los Angeles Lakers 106
Scoring by quarter: 32–25, 24–26, 12–30, 25–25
Pts: Dennis Johnson 33; Rebs: Johnson, McHale 10 each Asts: Danny Ainge 6	Pts: Kareem Abdul-Jabbar 32; Rebs: Mychal Thompson 9 Asts: Magic Johnson 19
Los Angeles wins the series, 4–2

The Forum, Inglewood, California
Attendance: 17,505
Referees:
- No. 10 Darell Garretson
- No. 17 Joe Crawford

Kareem Abdul-Jabbar arrived for Game 6 with a shaved head and a determination to close out this series. For a while, though, it appeared like the Celtics would steal it. Magic Johnson had only four points at the half and Dennis Johnson poured in 18 for the Celtics on his way to a game-high 33 as Boston led 56–51 at intermission.

The Lakers scored the first two baskets of the second half to cut it to 56–55. On the Celtics' ensuing possession, James Worthy deflected a pass and gave chase. Worthy went to the floor, batted the ball inbounds to a breaking Magic Johnson, and Magic slammed home a breakaway dunk. This gave the Lakers their first lead of the game 57–56, since early in the first quarter, and they never trailed again. The Lakers outscored the Celtics 30–12 in the third quarter for an 18-point turnaround, mostly on fast breaks. The score at the end of three quarters was 81–68, Lakers. The Celtics only scored 12 points in the third quarter, one more than the record for the lowest scoring quarter in playoff history.

Worthy would finish with 22 points, and Mychal Thompson had 16 points and 10 rebounds off the bench, but the play of the Lakers' two superstars, Magic and Kareem, would be the dagger that finished off the Celtics. Magic recovered from his cold first half to post 16 points, 19 assists, and eight rebounds, and Kareem would pump in a team-high 32 points.

"Magic is a great, great basketball player," Bird stated flatly, settling the issue for the moment. "The best I've ever seen."

Indeed, Magic would gain the NBA Finals MVP award and his fourth championship ring.

For the Lakers, this would be their last NBA Finals series triumph over the Celtics until 2010.

This would also be the last time the NBA championship was ever clinched in an afternoon game. Following the 1991 NBA Finals all Finals games would be played in primetime.

== Team rosters ==
=== Los Angeles Lakers ===
1986–87 Los Angeles Lakers roster
Players

Pos.	No.	Player	Height	Weight	DOB	From
C	33	Kareem Abdul-Jabbar	7 ft 2 in (2.18 m)	225 lb (102 kg)	1947–04–16	UCLA
SG	24	Adrian Branch	6 ft 8 in (2.03 m)	185 lb (84 kg)	1963–11–17	Maryland
G/F	21	Michael Cooper	6 ft 5 in (1.96 m)	170 lb (77 kg)	1956–04–15	New Mexico
PF	45	A. C. Green	6 ft 9 in (2.06 m)	220 lb (100 kg)	1963–10–04	Oregon State
PG	32	Magic Johnson	6 ft 9 in (2.06 m)	215 lb (98 kg)	1959–08–14	Michigan State
PG	1	Wes Matthews	6 ft 1 in (1.85 m)	170 lb (77 kg)	1959–08–24	Wisconsin
PF	31	Kurt Rambis	6 ft 8 in (2.03 m)	213 lb (97 kg)	1958–02–25	Santa Clara
SG	4	Byron Scott	6 ft 3 in (1.91 m)	195 lb (88 kg)	1961–03–28	Arizona State
C	52	Mike Smrek	7 ft 0 in (2.13 m)	250 lb (113 kg)	1962–08–31	Canisius
SF	55	Billy Thompson	6 ft 7 in (2.01 m)	195 lb (88 kg)	1963–12–01	Louisville
C	43	Mychal Thompson	6 ft 10 in (2.08 m)	226 lb (103 kg)	1955–01–30	Minnesota
SF	42	James Worthy	6 ft 9 in (2.06 m)	225 lb (102 kg)	1961–02–27	North Carolina

Coaches
Head coach
- Pat Riley
Assistant(s)
- Bill Bertka
- Randy Pfund

Legend
- (DP) Unsigned draft pick
- (FA) Free agent
- (S) Suspended
- Injured

=== Boston Celtics ===
1986–87 Boston Celtics roster
Players

Pos.	No.	Player	Height	Weight	DOB	From
SG	44	Danny Ainge	6 ft 4 in (1.93 m)	175 lb (79 kg)	1959-03-17	BYU
SF	33	Larry Bird	6 ft 9 in (2.06 m)	220 lb (100 kg)	1956-12-07	Indiana State
SG	34	Rick Carlisle	6 ft 5 in (1.96 m)	210 lb (95 kg)	1959-10-27	Virginia
SF	20	Darren Daye	6 ft 8 in (2.03 m)	220 lb (100 kg)	1960-11-30	UCLA
SG	43	Conner Henry	6 ft 7 in (2.01 m)	195 lb (88 kg)	1963-07-21	UC Santa Barbara
PG	3	Dennis Johnson	6 ft 4 in (1.93 m)	185 lb (84 kg)	1954-09-18	Pepperdine
C	50	Greg Kite	6 ft 11 in (2.11 m)	250 lb (113 kg)	1961-08-05	BYU
PF	32	Kevin McHale	6 ft 10 in (2.08 m)	210 lb (95 kg)	1957-12-19	Minnesota
C	00	Robert Parish	7 ft 0 in (2.13 m)	230 lb (104 kg)	1953-08-30	Centenary
PF	31	Fred Roberts	6 ft 10 in (2.08 m)	218 lb (99 kg)	1960-08-10	BYU
PG	12	Jerry Sichting	6 ft 1 in (1.85 m)	168 lb (76 kg)	1956-11-29	Purdue
SG	11	Sam Vincent	6 ft 2 in (1.88 m)	185 lb (84 kg)	1963-05-18	Michigan State
C	5	Bill Walton	6 ft 11 in (2.11 m)	235 lb (107 kg)	1952-11-05	UCLA
SF	8	Scott Wedman	6 ft 7 in (2.01 m)	215 lb (98 kg)	1952-07-29	Colorado

Coaches
Head coach
- K.C. Jones
Assistant(s)
- Jimmy Rodgers
- Chris Ford

Legend
- (DP) Unsigned draft pick
- (FA) Free agent
- (S) Suspended
- Injured

== Player statistics ==
Legend
GP	Games played	GS	Games started	MPG	Minutes per game
FG%	Field-goal percentage	3P%	3-point field-goal percentage	FT%	Free-throw percentage
RPG	Rebounds per game	APG	Assists per game	SPG	Steals per game
BPG	Blocks per game	PPG	Points per game

Los Angeles Lakers

Los Angeles Lakers statistics
Player	GP	GS	MPG	FG%	3P%	FT%	RPG	APG	SPG	BPG	PPG
Kareem Abdul-Jabbar	6	6	33.8	.510	.000	.667	7.3	0.8	0.5	2.5	21.7
Adrian Branch	4	0	2.5	.167	.000	.500	0.8	0.3	0.3	0.0	1.3
Michael Cooper	6	0	29.8	.540	.609	1.000	2.3	4.7	1.7	0.3	12.0
A.C. Green	6	6	24.0	.500	.000	.700	5.2	0.2	0.3	0.3	7.8
Magic Johnson	6	6	39.3	.541	.500	.960	8.0	13.0	2.3	0.3	26.2
Wes Matthews	4	0	3.3	.333	.000	.500	0.3	0.5	0.0	0.0	1.3
Kurt Rambis	6	0	9.3	.429	.000	.833	2.5	0.5	0.0	0.0	1.8
Byron Scott	6	6	30.2	.484	.083	.909	3.0	2.3	0.5	0.2	11.8
Mike Smrek	4	0	2.3	.333	.000	.000	1.3	0.0	0.0	0.3	0.5
Mychal Thompson	6	0	28.5	.561	.000	.778	5.2	0.7	0.8	1.2	11.2
James Worthy	6	6	39.7	.523	.000	.526	5.3	4.0	1.7	0.8	20.7

Boston Celtics

Boston Celtics statistics
Player	GP	GS	MPG	FG%	3P%	FT%	RPG	APG	SPG	BPG	PPG
Danny Ainge	6	6	39.0	.500	.429	1.000	3.0	5.0	1.2	0.3	12.5
Larry Bird	6	6	42.3	.445	.500	.921	10.0	5.5	1.2	1.2	24.2
Darren Daye	6	0	8.3	.625	.000	1.000	1.3	0.7	0.2	0.2	4.5
Conner Henry	4	0	3.8	.444	.000	.500	0.8	0.0	0.0	0.0	2.5
Dennis Johnson	6	6	40.7	.481	.125	.885	4.3	9.3	0.5	0.5	21.0
Greg Kite	6	0	12.7	.222	.000	.500	3.0	0.8	0.3	0.8	0.8
Kevin McHale	6	6	38.5	.585	.000	.818	9.0	2.0	0.2	1.0	20.5
Robert Parish	6	6	30.5	.592	.000	.593	6.5	1.2	0.8	1.2	16.7
Fred Roberts	5	0	8.0	.727	.000	.545	1.8	0.6	0.2	0.0	4.4
Jerry Sichting	6	0	9.3	.267	.000	.000	0.7	1.8	0.3	0.0	1.3
Sam Vincent	4	0	8.3	.500	.000	.700	1.0	1.3	0.3	0.3	4.8
Bill Walton	5	0	4.8	.600	.000	.000	1.0	0.2	0.0	0.2	1.2

== Television coverage ==
The Boston Celtics season documentary Home of the Brave, narrated by David Perry, recaps Boston's 1987 season while the Los Angeles Lakers documentary Drive for Five, narrated by legendary Lakers announcer Chick Hearn, recaps the Lakers' magnificent 1987 season in route to a fourth title of the 1980s.

CBS' James Brown filled in for Pat O'Brien when he attended the birth of his son. Brown was on for Games 3 and 4. Both Brown and O'Brien reported on the Lakers' sideline. While Lesley Visser was on for all the games as sideline reporter for CBS as she reported on the Celtics' sideline.

Dick Stockton and Tom Heinsohn worked play-by-play and color commentary respectively. It was the fourth consecutive and last Finals series to pair Stockton and Heinsohn together; Heinsohn was demoted in favor of Billy Cunningham following the series. At the time, Stockton and Heinsohn had worked the most number of NBA Finals series together. ESPN/ABC's Mike Breen, Mark Jackson and Jeff Van Gundy later broke the record for the most complete NBA Finals series called by a single television play-by-play/color commentary team following the 2011 NBA Finals, and called a record 14 complete NBA Finals series in total (the 2022 NBA Finals did involve the trio of Breen, Jackson and Van Gundy, but Mark Jones filled in for Breen on play-by-play in Games 1 and 2 due to his recovery from COVID-19, and Van Gundy missed Game 1 for the same reason).

== Aftermath ==
The 1987 Finals would be the Celtics' last until their 2008 championship season, but would be the last for the 'Big Three' of Larry Bird, Kevin McHale and Robert Parish. In K.C. Jones' final season as Celtics' coach they still won the Atlantic Division title by winning 57 games, but the Celtics fell in six games to the Detroit Pistons, in the rematch of their Eastern Conference finals showdown in 1988. The Celtics would not reach that far again for the next 14 years. The Celtics did not reach the NBA Finals again until 2008, where they defeated the Lakers in six games; by then, the general manager of the team was former player Danny Ainge.

Following their championship win, Lakers coach Pat Riley guaranteed a repeat championship during the team's championship parade a few days after winning the NBA Finals. As Riley predicted, the Lakers would repeat as champions the following season, as they narrowly defeated the Detroit Pistons in seven games after a controversial foul on the Pistons saved the Lakers from elimination in Game 6. The Lakers were the first repeat NBA champions since the 1968–1969 Celtics.

Prior to 2008, the Celtics and Lakers came close to renewing their rivalry in 2002. But while the Lakers reached the Finals, the Celtics were upset by the New Jersey Nets, who were coached by Byron Scott, in six games in the Eastern Conference Finals.

== See also ==
- 1987 NBA playoffs
