= 1988 NBA Finals =

1988 basketball championship series

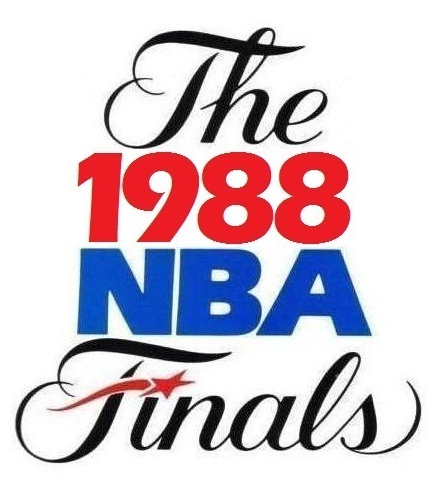
Team	Coach	Wins
Los Angeles Lakers	Pat Riley	4
Detroit Pistons	Chuck Daly	3
- Dates: June 7–21
- MVP: James Worthy (Los Angeles Lakers)
- Hall of Famers: Pistons: Adrian Dantley (2008); Joe Dumars (2006); Dennis Rodman (2011); Isiah Thomas (2000); Lakers: Kareem Abdul-Jabbar (1995); Michael Cooper (2024); Magic Johnson (2002); James Worthy (2003); Coaches: Chuck Daly (1994); Pat Riley (2008); Officials: Hugh Evans (2022); Darell Garretson (2016); Earl Strom (1995)
- Eastern finals: Pistons defeated Celtics, 4–2
- Western finals: Lakers defeated Mavericks, 4–3

The 1988 NBA Finals was the championship series of the National Basketball Association's (NBA) 1987–88 season, and the culmination of the season's playoffs. The defending NBA champion and Western Conference champion Los Angeles Lakers defeated the Eastern Conference champion Detroit Pistons in seven games to win their eleventh title. This was the last championship for the Lakers until 2000.

One of Lakers head coach Pat Riley's most famous moments came when he promised the crowd a repeat championship during the Lakers' 1987 championship parade in downtown Los Angeles. With every team in the league now gunning for them, the Lakers still found a way to win, taking their seventh consecutive Pacific Division title. While the 1988 Lakers did not produce as many wins in the regular season as the 1987 Lakers, they were just as successful in the playoffs, becoming the first team since the Boston Celtics in 1969 to repeat as champions.

One of Pistons guard Isiah Thomas's career-defining performances came in Game 6. Despite badly twisting his ankle midway through the period, Thomas scored an NBA Finals record 25 third-quarter points, but Detroit fell valiantly, 103–102, after a controversial foul on Bill Laimbeer in the final seconds of the game.

Thomas still managed to score 10 first-half points in Game 7, as Detroit built a 5-point lead. In the 3rd quarter, the Lakers, inspired by Finals MVP James Worthy and Byron Scott (14 3rd-quarter points), exploded as they built a 10-point lead entering the final period. The lead swelled to 15 before Detroit mounted a furious 4th-quarter rally, trimming the lead to two points on several occasions. The Lakers ultimately prevailed and captured their fifth championship in the last nine seasons and eleventh overall.

This was the first NBA Finals since 1983 not to feature the Boston Celtics. It would also be the last to feature teams scoring 100 points or more in Game 7 until the Oklahoma City Thunder did so in 2025.

== Background ==
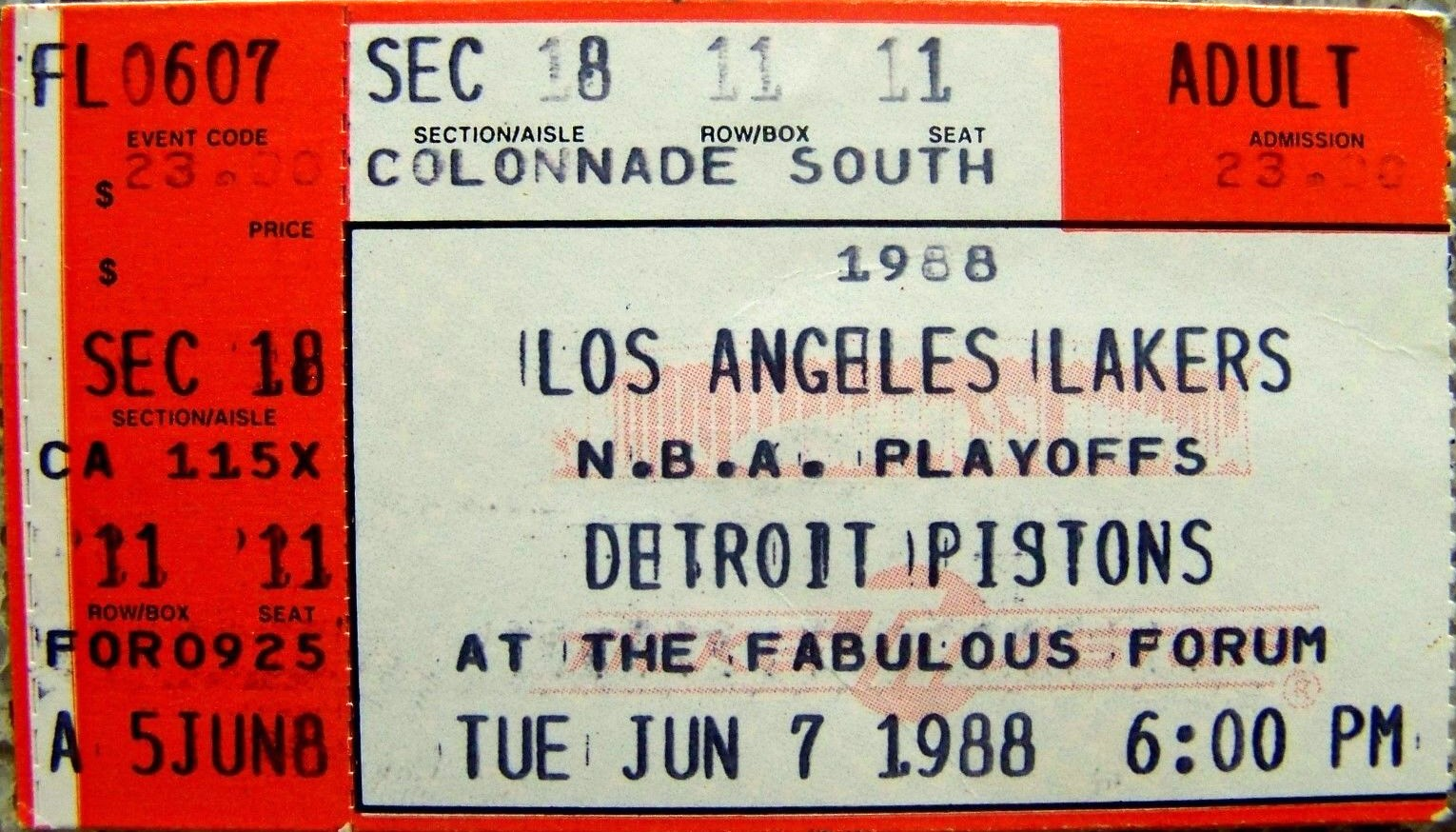
A ticket for Game 1 of the 1988 NBA Finals at The Forum.

=== Los Angeles Lakers ===
During the 1987 championship parade in Los Angeles, Lakers coach Pat Riley guaranteed a repeat championship, a feat that had not been achieved since the Boston Celtics won the 1969 NBA Finals. Motivated by their coach's boast, the Lakers once again earned the league's best record in the 1987–88 season (62–20), despite winning three games less than the previous year. They also had a 15-game winning streak from December 11, 1987, until the Lakers were beaten by the LA Clippers (109–110) on January 13, 1988. They also had another double-digit winning streak (10-game winning streak) from February 11 until February 28.

The playoffs proved to be a difficult climb for the Lakers, however. They swept the San Antonio Spurs in the first round. They came back from a 2–1 deficit against the Utah Jazz in the semifinals round before beating them in Game 7. They then defeated the Dallas Mavericks in 7 games in the Conference finals round. The Lakers eventually prevailed in both series thanks to their championship experience.

=== Detroit Pistons ===
The Pistons of head coach Chuck Daly were an up-and-coming team that gradually moved up the Eastern Conference ranks. Known as the "Bad Boys" for their physical and defensive-minded style of play, the Pistons' core featured guards Isiah Thomas and Joe Dumars, forwards Adrian Dantley and Rick Mahorn, center Bill Laimbeer, and bench players Vinnie Johnson, Dennis Rodman and John Salley. Midway through the season, Detroit gained a valuable backup to Laimbeer and Mahorn when they acquired James Edwards.

The 1987–88 season marked a further ascension for the franchise, as Detroit won the Central Division title with a 54–28 record. The second-seeded Pistons beat the Washington Bullets and the Chicago Bulls in five games each, before facing the Boston Celtics once again in the conference finals. This time, the Pistons were the better team, eliminating the Celtics in six games for their first NBA Finals appearance since 1956 and the franchise's first since moving to Detroit.

=== Road to the Finals ===
Los Angeles Lakers (Western Conference champion)		Detroit Pistons (Eastern Conference champion)
# / Western Conference; # / Team / W / L / PCT / GB; 1 / z-Los Angeles Lakers / 62 / 20 / .756 / –; 2 / y-Denver Nuggets / 54 / 28 / .659 / 8; 3 / x-Dallas Mavericks / 53 / 29 / .646 / 9; 4 / x-Portland Trail Blazers / 53 / 29 / .646 / 9; 5 / x-Utah Jazz / 47 / 35 / .573 / 15; 6 / x-Houston Rockets / 46 / 36 / .561 / 16; 7 / x-Seattle SuperSonics / 44 / 38 / .537 / 18; 8 / x-San Antonio Spurs / 31 / 51 / .378 / 31; 9 / Phoenix Suns / 28 / 54 / .341 / 34; 10 / Sacramento Kings / 24 / 58 / .293 / 38; 11 / Golden State Warriors / 20 / 62 / .244 / 42; 12 / Los Angeles Clippers / 17 / 65 / .207 / 45; 1st seed in the West, best league record	Regular season	# / Eastern Conference; # / Team / W / L / PCT / GB; 1 / c-Boston Celtics / 57 / 25 / .695 / –; 2 / y-Detroit Pistons / 54 / 28 / .659 / 3; 3 / x-Chicago Bulls / 50 / 32 / .610 / 7; 4 / x-Atlanta Hawks / 50 / 32 / .610 / 7; 5 / x-Milwaukee Bucks / 42 / 40 / .512 / 15; 6 / x-Cleveland Cavaliers / 42 / 40 / .512 / 15; 7 / x-Washington Bullets / 38 / 44 / .463 / 19; 8 / x-New York Knicks / 38 / 44 / .463 / 19; 9 / Indiana Pacers / 38 / 44 / .463 / 19; 10 / Philadelphia 76ers / 36 / 46 / .439 / 21; 11 / New Jersey Nets / 19 / 63 / .232 / 38; 2nd seed in the East, 4th best league record
Defeated the (8) San Antonio Spurs, 3–0	First round	Defeated the (7) Washington Bullets, 3–2
Defeated the (5) Utah Jazz, 4–3	Conference semifinals	Defeated the (3) Chicago Bulls, 4–1
Defeated the (3) Dallas Mavericks, 4–3	Conference finals	Defeated the (1) Boston Celtics, 4–2

=== Regular season series ===
The Los Angeles Lakers won both games in the regular season series:

January 8, 1988

Los Angeles Lakers 106, Detroit Pistons 104

Silverdome, Pontiac, Michigan

February 21, 1988

Detroit Pistons 110, Los Angeles Lakers 117

The Forum, Inglewood, California

== Series summary ==
Game	Date	Road team	Result	Home team
Game 1	June 7	Detroit Pistons	105–93 (1–0)	Los Angeles Lakers
Game 2	June 9	Detroit Pistons	96–108 (1–1)	Los Angeles Lakers
Game 3	June 12	Los Angeles Lakers	99–86 (2–1)	Detroit Pistons
Game 4	June 14	Los Angeles Lakers	86–111 (2–2)	Detroit Pistons
Game 5	June 16	Los Angeles Lakers	94–104 (2–3)	Detroit Pistons
Game 6	June 19	Detroit Pistons	102–103 (3–3)	Los Angeles Lakers
Game 7	June 21	Detroit Pistons	105–108 (3–4)	Los Angeles Lakers

=== Game 1 ===
CBS

June 7
9:00 pm EDT

Detroit Pistons 105, Los Angeles Lakers 93
Scoring by quarter: 22–21, 35–19, 23–28, 25–25
Pts: Adrian Dantley 34; Rebs: Bill Laimbeer 7 Asts: Isiah Thomas 12	Pts: Magic Johnson 28; Rebs: A.C. Green 12; Asts: Magic Johnson 10
Detroit leads the series, 1–0

The Forum, Inglewood, California
Attendance: 17,505
Referees:
- No. 10 Darell Garretson
- No. 17 Joe Crawford

The Pistons had just dispatched the Celtics in six games, while the Lakers were coming off back-to-back seven-game wins over the Utah Jazz and Dallas Mavericks. The Lakers were tired, and it showed. Adrian Dantley scored 34 points, hitting 14 of 16 shots from the field. The Pistons took control of the game with four seconds left in the first half when Bill Laimbeer hit a three-point shot to put the Pistons up 54–40. Isiah Thomas then stole Kareem's inbound pass at half court and let fly with another three-pointer which hit nothing but net at the halftime buzzer. The Pistons had a 57–40 halftime lead and never looked back, stealing Game 1 with a 105–93 win.

=== Game 2 ===
CBS

June 9
9:00 pm EDT

Detroit Pistons 96, Los Angeles Lakers 108
Scoring by quarter: 20–25, 19–24, 30–27, 27–32
Pts: Adrian Dantley 19; Rebs: Laimbeer, Mahorn 9 each Asts: Dumars, Thomas 7 each	Pts: James Worthy 26; Rebs: A.C. Green 13; Asts: Magic Johnson 11
Series tied, 1–1

The Forum, Inglewood, California
Attendance: 17,505
Referees:
- No. 4 Ed T. Rush
- No. 20 Jess Kersey

Facing the possibility of going down 2–0 with three games to play in Detroit, the veteran Lakers found resolve with a 108–96 win. James Worthy led the Lakers with 26 points, Byron Scott had 24, and Magic Johnson 23 despite battling the flu.

=== Game 3 ===
CBS

June 12
3:30 pm EDT

Los Angeles Lakers 99, Detroit Pistons 86
Scoring by quarter: 23–21, 24–25, 31–18, 21–22
Pts: James Worthy 24; Rebs: James Worthy 9 Asts: Magic Johnson 14	Pts: Isiah Thomas 28; Rebs: Dennis Rodman 12; Asts: Isiah Thomas 9
Los Angeles leads the series, 2–1

Pontiac Silverdome, Pontiac, Michigan
Attendance: 39,188
Referees:
- No. 12 Earl Strom
- No. 25 Hugh Evans

With Magic still battling the flu, the Lakers got a key win in Detroit, 99–86, to go up 2–1 in games. The Lakers took control of the game in the third period, outscoring the Pistons 31–18. Despite his illness, Magic had 18 points, 14 assists, and six rebounds.

=== Game 4 ===
CBS

June 14
9:00 pm EDT

Los Angeles Lakers 86, Detroit Pistons 111
Scoring by quarter: 29–32, 22–26, 14–25, 21–28
Pts: Magic Johnson 23; Rebs: A.C. Green 10; Asts: Magic Johnson 6	Pts: Adrian Dantley 27; Rebs: Isiah Thomas 9 Asts: Isiah Thomas 12
Series tied, 2–2

Pontiac Silverdome, Pontiac, Michigan
Attendance: 34,276
Referees:
- No. 11 Jake O'Donnell
- No. 14 Jack Madden

In front of their home fans, the Pistons tied the series at 2–2 with a 111–86 win. The Pistons decided to attack the basket and make Magic Johnson defend. Johnson wound up on the bench early in the second half with foul trouble.

With Magic out of the game, the Pistons built a substantial lead. During timeouts, Bill Laimbeer was almost frantic. He kept saying, "No letup! We don't let up!" They didn't, and blew out the defending NBA champions by 25 points.

Left open by the trapping Lakers defense, Dantley led the team with 27 points. Vinnie Johnson came off the bench to add 16 while James Edwards had 14 points and five rebounds off the bench.

=== Game 5 ===
CBS

June 16
9:00 pm EDT

Los Angeles Lakers 94, Detroit Pistons 104
Scoring by quarter: 30–27, 20–32, 25–22, 19–23
Pts: Kareem Abdul-Jabbar 26; Rebs: Abdul-Jabbar, Green, Johnson 6 each Asts: Magic Johnson 17	Pts: Adrian Dantley 25; Rebs: Bill Laimbeer 11; Asts: Isiah Thomas 8
Detroit lead the series, 3–2

Pontiac Silverdome, Pontiac, Michigan
Attendance: 41,372
Referees:
- No. 10 Darell Garretson
- No. 17 Joe Crawford

The Pistons' 104–94 victory was a perfect farewell to the Pontiac Silverdome. Bill Laimbeer told Joe Dumars with a minute left in the game to "look around and enjoy this because you'll never see anything like it again". He went on to say, "Forty-one thousand people waving towels and standing. It was awesome."

The Lakers opened Game 5 with a fury of physical intimidation, scoring the game's first 12 points. But that approach soon backfired, as the Laker big men got into foul trouble.

Dantley played a major role in the turnaround, scoring 25 points, 19 of them in the first half, to rally the Pistons to a 59–50 halftime lead. Vinnie Johnson added 12 of his 16 points in the first half to keep Detroit moving.

Joe Dumars added 19 points on 9-of-13 shooting to send the Pistons back to Los Angeles, one win away from their first NBA title.

Games 3, 4, and 5 were the last NBA Finals games to be contested in a domed stadium built primarily for football until the 1999 NBA Finals in which Games 1 and 2 were played at the Alamodome in San Antonio. The Pistons left the Pontiac Silverdome after the 1987–88 season and moved into The Palace of Auburn Hills for the 1988-89 NBA season.

=== Game 6 ===
CBS

June 19
3:30 pm EDT

Detroit Pistons 102, Los Angeles Lakers 103
Scoring by quarter: 26–20, 20–33, 35–26, 21–24
Pts: Isiah Thomas 43; Rebs: Bill Laimbeer 9 Asts: Joe Dumars 10	Pts: James Worthy 28; Rebs: A.C. Green 10; Asts: Magic Johnson 19
Series tied, 3–3

The Forum, Inglewood, California
Attendance: 17,505
Referees:
- No. 25 Hugh Evans
- No. 4 Ed T. Rush

The Lakers led 56–48 in the third quarter when Isiah Thomas suddenly began a classic performance. He scored his team's next 14 points, hitting two free throws, a driving layup, four jump shots, and a running bank shot.

With a little less than 5 minutes left in the period and the score 70–64, Lakers, Thomas rolled his right ankle while passing off to Joe Dumars for a basket. Thomas tried to run upcourt, but collapsed while the Lakers scored again. Despite a severe sprain, Thomas returned to the game with 3:44 left and the Lakers up 74–66. Thomas, with his bad ankle, scored 11 of the Pistons' last 15 points of the quarter to finish with 25, an NBA Finals record for one quarter, on 11-of-13 shooting. During this time, the Pistons outscored the Lakers 15–5 to take an 81–79 lead.

The fourth quarter was nip-and-tuck; with 1:30 left, Thomas, sore ankle and all, hit a baseline jumper for his 42nd and 43rd points to give the Pistons a 100–99 lead. The Lakers came down and Magic Johnson got the ball inside to James Worthy, but his layup attempt was blocked by Dennis Rodman. Joe Dumars penetrated inside on the ensuing possession, was fouled, and hit the two free throws for a three-point lead at 102–99 with a minute left.

The Lakers called timeout, and on the next possession, Byron Scott drove by Thomas from the top of the key and hit a 14-footer from the right elbow to cut the lead to one with 45 seconds left. Thomas then missed another baseline jumper and Worthy rebounded with 27 seconds remaining. The Lakers then set up and Scott got it to Kareem Abdul-Jabbar, who drew a foul on Bill Laimbeer (his sixth) as he wheeled for a skyhook on the right baseline with 14 seconds left. Replay showed Laimbeer jumping toward Abdul-Jabbar and bumping his left shoulder during the shot. This foul has remained controversial to the Pistons and their fans, who claim that Laimbeer never made contact with Jabbar on his shot attempt, often referred to as a "phantom foul". Abdul–Jabbar then proceeded to sink two high-pressure free throws providing the Lakers with a one-point lead.

After a time out, the Pistons set up for a final shot. Thomas collided with Dantley after inbounding the ball, but Dumars penetrated in the paint and put up a shot that missed after he was forced to by A.C. Green to alter it. After a scramble, Scott came up with the ball for the Lakers and was shoved out of bounds by Rodman, inciting a near-fight, with 5 seconds left on the clock. Scott missed both free throw attempts, but the Pistons, who had no timeouts remaining, lost precious seconds trying to secure the loose rebound and could not get a shot off before time expired.

Thomas had 43 points and eight assists despite his ankle injury. To date, Thomas’ 25 points in the third quarter is still the record for most points in a quarter of the NBA Finals.

=== Game 7 ===
CBS

June 21
9:00 pm EDT

Detroit Pistons 105, Los Angeles Lakers 108
Scoring by quarter: 23–21, 29–26, 21–36, 32–25
Pts: Joe Dumars 25; Rebs: John Salley 10; Asts: Isiah Thomas 7	Pts: James Worthy 36; Rebs: James Worthy 16; Asts: Johnson 14
Los Angeles wins the series, 4–3

The Forum, Inglewood, California
Attendance: 17,505
Referees:
- No. 12 Earl Strom
- No. 11 Jake O'Donnell

This was the first Game 7 since 1984, and the first to be played under the 2–3–2 format, adopted in 1985. It also was the very last playoff game manned by two officials, as the league added one more next season.

In the final game, Thomas' ankle was still sore, as evidenced by his limping badly in warm-ups. He did manage to play the first half, scoring 10 points and leading the Pistons to a 52–47 halftime lead, but the delay between halves caused the ankle to stiffen and Thomas played little in the second half. With Isiah on the bench, the Lakers turned the halftime deficit into a 90–75 lead early in the 4th quarter. A key factor was Laker guard Michael Cooper; he had been mired in a terrible shooting slump all series, but suddenly caught fire, hitting three 3-point baskets.

Chuck Daly then went to a faster lineup with Dennis Rodman, John Salley, Joe Dumars, and Vinnie Johnson that created matchup problems for the Lakers and enabled the Pistons to score at a torrid pace. With 3:54 left, Salley canned two free throws to cut the Laker lead to 98–92, making the Forum fans nervous.

With 1:17 left, Dumars hit a jump shot to cut the lead to 102–100. Magic Johnson then hit a free throw after a Rodman foul to put the Lakers up by three. After the two teams exchanged turnovers, Rodman took an ill-advised jumper with 40 seconds left. Byron Scott rebounded and was fouled. His two free throws pushed the lead to 105–100. After another Pistons' turnover, Michael Cooper had a chance to essentially clinch the victory after being fouled, but he missed both free throws, and the Lakers' lead remained at five.

After Dumars made a layup, James Worthy hit a free throw and Bill Laimbeer canned a 28-foot three-pointer, pushing the score to 106–105 with six seconds showing. A.C. Green completed the scoring with a layup off a length-of-the court pass from Magic, making it 108–105. Laimbeer made a long desperate pass to Thomas who caught the ball trying to shoot a three to send the game to overtime, but Thomas fell to the floor in a collision with Johnson, losing the ball as time ran out. Fans were already beginning to storm onto the floor even though time had not expired, but the officials ignored this. Pat Riley and the Laker players hurried back to their dressing room as the players and coaches on both teams were pummeled by the storming fans.

Worthy racked up a triple-double: 36 points, 16 rebounds and 10 assists. It would prove to be the only triple-double in Worthy's Hall of Fame career. For that and his earlier efforts in the series, he was named the Finals MVP, cementing his nickname "Big Game James".

Michael Cooper, Magic Johnson and Kareem Abdul-Jabbar are the only members of all 5 Lakers championship teams from the 1980s. Pat Riley is the only coach that was on all 5 Lakers championship teams from the 1980s, he was an assistant coach on the 1980 championship team, and head coach on the other four championship teams.

This was the Lakers' first Game 7 Finals victory since 1954; however, it was their first ever Game 7 win in the Finals since moving to Los Angeles in 1960; they were 0–5 in previous Game 7's since moving (1962, 1966, 1969, 1970, 1984). This would end up being the Lakers' last home win in the Finals until 2000.

== Team rosters ==
=== Los Angeles Lakers ===
1987–88 Los Angeles Lakers roster
Players

Pos.	No.	Player	Height	Weight	DOB	From
C	33	Kareem Abdul-Jabbar	7 ft 2 in (2.18 m)	225 lb (102 kg)	1947–04–16	UCLA
G/F	19	Tony Campbell	6 ft 7 in (2.01 m)	215 lb (98 kg)	1962–05–17	Ohio State
G/F	21	Michael Cooper	6 ft 5 in (1.96 m)	170 lb (77 kg)	1956–04–15	New Mexico
PF	45	A. C. Green	6 ft 9 in (2.06 m)	220 lb (100 kg)	1963–10–04	Oregon State
PG	32	Magic Johnson	6 ft 9 in (2.06 m)	215 lb (98 kg)	1959–08–14	Michigan State
G/F	3	Jeff Lamp	6 ft 6 in (1.98 m)	195 lb (88 kg)	1959–03–09	Virginia
PG	1	Wes Matthews	6 ft 1 in (1.85 m)	170 lb (77 kg)	1959–08–24	Wisconsin
PF	31	Kurt Rambis	6 ft 8 in (2.03 m)	213 lb (97 kg)	1958–02–25	Santa Clara
SG	4	Byron Scott	6 ft 3 in (1.91 m)	195 lb (88 kg)	1961–03–28	Arizona State
C	52	Mike Smrek	7 ft 0 in (2.13 m)	250 lb (113 kg)	1962–08–31	Canisius
SF	55	Billy Thompson	6 ft 7 in (2.01 m)	195 lb (88 kg)	1963–12–01	Louisville
C	43	Mychal Thompson	6 ft 10 in (2.08 m)	226 lb (103 kg)	1955–01–30	Minnesota
SG	20	Milt Wagner	6 ft 5 in (1.96 m)	185 lb (84 kg)	1963–02–20	Louisville
SF	42	James Worthy	6 ft 9 in (2.06 m)	225 lb (102 kg)	1961–02–27	North Carolina

Coaches
Head coach
- Pat Riley
Assistant(s)
- Bill Bertka
- Randy Pfund

Legend
- (DP) Unsigned draft pick
- (FA) Free agent
- (S) Suspended
- Injured

=== Detroit Pistons ===
1987–88 Detroit Pistons roster
Players

Pos.	No.	Player	Height	Weight	DOB	From
C	00	William Bedford	7 ft 0 in (2.13 m)	225 lb (102 kg)	1963–12–14	Memphis
SF	45	Adrian Dantley	6 ft 5 in (1.96 m)	208 lb (94 kg)	1955–02–28	Notre Dame
C	50	Darryl Dawkins	6 ft 11 in (2.11 m)	251 lb (114 kg)	1957–01–11	Maynard Evans (HS)
SG	4	Joe Dumars	6 ft 3 in (1.91 m)	190 lb (86 kg)	1963–05–24	McNeese State
F/C	53	James Edwards	7 ft 0 in (2.13 m)	225 lb (102 kg)	1955–11–22	Washington
PG	15	Vinnie Johnson	6 ft 2 in (1.88 m)	200 lb (91 kg)	1956–09–01	Baylor
C	40	Bill Laimbeer	6 ft 11 in (2.11 m)	245 lb (111 kg)	1957–05–19	Notre Dame
SG	35	Ralph Lewis	6 ft 6 in (1.98 m)	200 lb (91 kg)	1963–03–08	La Salle
F/C	44	Rick Mahorn	6 ft 10 in (2.08 m)	240 lb (109 kg)	1958–09–21	Hampton
C	54	Ron Moore	7 ft 0 in (2.13 m)	260 lb (118 kg)	1962–06–16	West Virginia State
C	42	Chuck Nevitt	7 ft 5 in (2.26 m)	217 lb (98 kg)	1959–06–13	NC State
SF	10	Dennis Rodman	6 ft 8 in (2.03 m)	210 lb (95 kg)	1961–05–13	SE Oklahoma State
SG	23	Walker Russell	6 ft 5 in (1.96 m)	195 lb (88 kg)	1960–10–26	Western Michigan
PF	22	John Salley	6 ft 11 in (2.11 m)	230 lb (104 kg)	1964–05–16	Georgia Tech
PG	11	Isiah Thomas	6 ft 1 in (1.85 m)	180 lb (82 kg)	1961–04–30	Indiana

Coaches
Head coach
- Chuck Daly
Assistant(s)
- Brendan Malone
- Brendan Suhr

Legend
- (DP) Unsigned draft pick
- (FA) Free agent
- (S) Suspended
- Injured

== Player statistics ==
Legend
GP	Games played	GS	Games started	MPG	Minutes per game
FG%	Field-goal percentage	3P%	3-point field-goal percentage	FT%	Free-throw percentage
RPG	Rebounds per game	APG	Assists per game	SPG	Steals per game
BPG	Blocks per game	PPG	Points per game

Los Angeles Lakers

Los Angeles Lakers statistics
Player	GP	GS	MPG	FG%	3P%	FT%	RPG	APG	SPG	BPG	PPG
Kareem Abdul-Jabbar	7	7	29.6	.414	.000	.714	4.1	1.0	0.6	1.1	13.1
Tony Campbell	2	0	7.0	.667	.000	1.000	0.5	0.5	0.0	0.0	4.0
Michael Cooper	7	0	25.1	.205	.150	.625	1.6	2.1	0.9	0.3	3.7
A.C. Green	7	7	34.6	.558	.000	.733	8.7	0.6	0.4	0.0	10.0
Magic Johnson	7	7	41.4	.550	.333	.866	5.7	13.0	2.0	0.1	21.1
Wes Matthews	4	0	2.3	.333	.000	1.0	0.0	0.0	0.3	0.0	1.5
Kurt Rambis	5	0	6.6	.667	.000	.400	1.6	0.0	0.2	0.0	1.2
Byron Scott	7	7	40.1	.476	.455	.771	4.9	2.0	1.0	0.4	18.9
Mike Smrek	2	0	3.0	.000	.000	.000	1.0	0.0	0.0	0.0	0.0
Mychal Thompson	7	0	21.6	.500	.000	.412	3.6	0.3	0.0	0.4	7.0
Milt Wagner	2	0	2.5	.000	.000	.000	0.0	0.5	0.0	0.0	0.0
James Worthy	7	7	38.0	.492	.000	.735	7.4	4.4	0.7	0.6	22.0

Detroit Pistons

Detroit Pistons statistics
Player	GP	GS	MPG	FG%	3P%	FT%	RPG	APG	SPG	BPG	PPG
Adrian Dantley	7	7	36.4	.573	.000	.859	5.0	2.3	0.6	0.1	21.3
Joe Dumars	7	7	33.3	.513	.500	.929	2.3	4.6	0.6	0.0	13.4
James Edwards	7	0	13.7	.477	.000	.636	3.0	1.0	0.1	0.4	7.0
Vinnie Johnson	7	0	23.4	.405	.167	.444	3.7	3.0	0.7	0.1	11.0
Bill Laimbeer	7	7	33.6	.391	.333	1.000	8.9	1.9	0.4	1.0	9.4
Ralph Lewis	3	0	1.3	.500	.000	.000	1.0	0.0	0.0	0.0	0.7
Rick Mahorn	7	7	10.6	.409	.000	.833	2.4	0.1	0.0	0.6	3.3
Chuck Nevitt	1	0	1.0	.500	.000	.000	2.0	0.0	0.0	0.0	2.0
Dennis Rodman	7	0	24.9	.629	.000	.524	6.9	0.6	0.9	1.0	7.9
Walker Russell	3	0	1.7	.333	.000	1.000	0.0	0.0	0.0	0.0	1.3
John Salley	7	0	25.3	.581	.000	.700	6.3	0.9	0.7	1.3	7.1
Isiah Thomas	7	7	37.4	.426	.294	.833	4.4	9.0	2.9	0.3	19.7

== Television coverage ==
The Detroit Pistons season documentary "Bad Boys", narrated by George Blaha recaps Detroit's run to the Finals and how they garnered the "Bad Boys" moniker while the Los Angeles Lakers documentary "Back To Back", narrated by Chick Hearn recaps the Lakers quest to become the first team since the Bill Russell-led Celtics to achieve NBA championships in consecutive years.

That year, CBS Sports used three sideline reporters which were Pat O'Brien (the Pistons' sideline), Lesley Visser (the Lakers' sideline) and James Brown (both teams). Dick Stockton and Billy Cunningham served as the play-by-play announcer and color analyst respectively. After the season, Cunningham left CBS to join the Miami Heat ownership group, and Hubie Brown was promoted the following season.

== Aftermath ==
Head coach Pat Riley and his wife Chris Rodstrom handing President Ronald Reagan a warm-up jersey at the team's White House visit.

Both teams would meet again in the Finals the next year, in which the Pistons swept the Lakers to win their first championship. The Lakers came into the series exhausted after Pat Riley held a torturous mini-camp in Santa Barbara to keep the Lakers fresh after sweeping through the Western Conference playoffs. During the mini-camp, Byron Scott picked up a hamstring injury and did not appear in the Finals and Magic Johnson suffered the same injury in Game 2 and could not finish the series.

Despite their famous "kiss" on the cheek before the 1988 NBA Finals, Isiah Thomas and Magic Johnson friendship would become strained thereafter. It deteriorated around the 1989 Finals, worsened by allegations that Thomas spread rumors about Johnson's sexuality after his 1991 HIV announcement. Then Thomas blamed Johnson as he felt he had something to do with him being left off the 1992 Olympic Dream Team. This was confirmed in Johnson's book, When the Game Was Ours, when he admitted to being instrumental in keeping Thomas off the team. In 2017, they appeared on NBA TV for a 1-on-1 interview, where they tearfully apologized and reconciled.

Although the Lakers did not win their third consecutive title, head coach Pat Riley filed for the trademark "three-peat" in 1988 for use on apparel and other merchandise, allowing him to collect royalties when teams in the future like the Chicago Bulls (1991–1993 and 1996–1998), New York Yankees (1998–2000), or Lakers (2000–2002) achieved three consecutive championships, with most proceeds going to charity. It was later revealed that Byron Scott was the one who coined the term three-peat originally.

This was the last championship the Lakers won during the Showtime era. After being swept by the Pistons in the 1989 NBA Finals, they made one more trip to the Finals in 1991, but lost to Michael Jordan and his Chicago Bulls in five games, becoming the first victim of the Bulls' first three-peat from 1991 to 1993. The Lakers' next title would come in 2000 over the Reggie Miller-led Indiana Pacers in six games. The Lakers and Pistons met in the Finals again in 2004, which the Pistons also won.

Four months later, the Los Angeles Dodgers would win the World Series, making Los Angeles the first city ever to win NBA and MLB championships within the same season.

== See also ==
- 1988 NBA playoffs
