= 1979 Pizza Hut All-Star Basketball Classic =

1979 College-organized Basketball All-Star Game

Pizza Hut Basketball All-Star Classic
| West All-Stars | East All-Stars |
|---|---|
| 92 | 107 |
- Date: March 31, 1979
- Venue: Las Vegas Convention Center, Las Vegas
- MVP: Larry Bird
- Network: CBS

The 1979 Pizza Hut Basketball All-Star Classic (also known as College East-West All-American Game) was the 8th All-Star Game sponsored by Pizza Hut and sanctioned by the NCAA and NAIA. It was held at the Las Vegas Convention Center in Las Vegas on March 31, 1979. The West All-Stars were defeated by the East All-Stars 92–107.

The Pizza Hut Basketball All-Star Classic started as a postseason event in 1972. The 1979 edition was the only college All-Star Game that future Hall of Famers Larry Bird and Nick Galis played in. It was televised by CBS.

Larry Bird was named the MVP.

== Voting ==
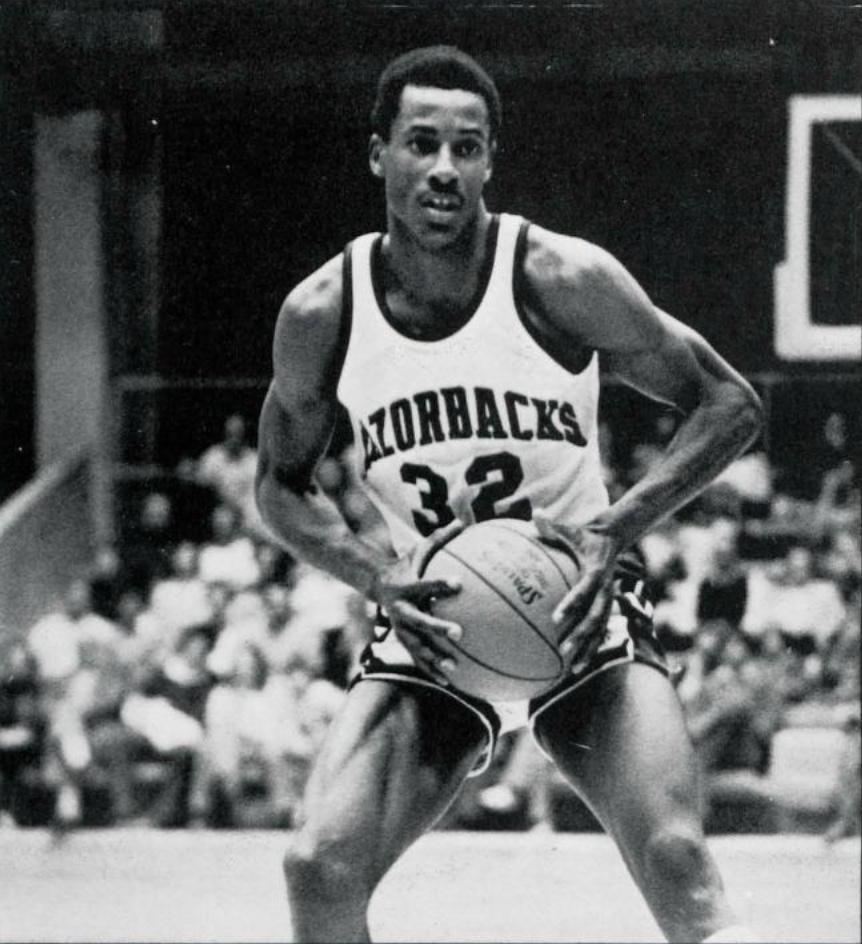
Arkansas player Sidney Moncrief was selected for the West All Stars.

Th ballots for the players' selection were available at all Pizza Hut restaurants of the country and the participating colleges. USA's top 100 senior College basketball players were eligible for election.

Eight players of each team (East and West) were elected by popular vote, while the remaining two were selected by a national coaching media panel. Larry Bird received 2 million votes nationwide. It was more than double than other college player received in the previous seven editions of the All-Star Classic.

Magic Johnson was a Sophomore at the time and he was not eligible for election despite being voted in the first team 1979 NCAA Men's Basketball All-Americans.

== The 1979 All-Star Game ==
The game was held at the Las Vegas Convention Center in Las Vegas, like in all the previous editions. It started at 4 pm.

Pizza Hut sponsored the college all-star classic annually each spring.

=== The Game ===
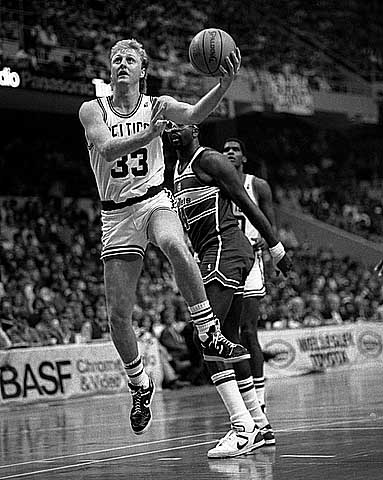
Larry Bird of the East All-Stars was the MVP of the game.

The East wore red jerseys and the West wore blue. The East All-Stars won the game by 107–92.

Larry Bird was the MVP having 5 assists and scoring 17 points, the highest scorer for the East. He was teammates with future Boston Celtics teammate Terry Duerod. Earl Evans was the game's topscorer with 21. Other scorers were: Terry Duerod 12, Dudley Bradley 12, Reggie King 12, Gary Garland 12. For the West Calvin Natt scored 14 and Larry Demic had 15.

The 1979 College All-Star Basketball Classic was played for charity purposes and all the revenue went to the Pizza Hut Charities Foundation.

== All-Star teams ==
=== Rosters ===
West All-Stars
| Pos. | Number | Player | College team | Previous appearances |
Team
| F | #40 | (United States) Earl Evans | UNLV Runnin' Rebels | |
| C | #52 | (United States) Ollie Matson | Pepperdine Waves | |
| G | #20 | (United States) Vinnie Johnson | Baylor Bears | |
| G | #12 | (United States) Sidney Moncrief | Arkansas Razorbacks | |
| C | #52 | (United States) Calvin Natt | Louisiana–Monroe Warhawks | |
| F | # | (United States) Larry Demic | Arizona Wildcats | |
| G | #34 | (United States) Lawrence Butler | Idaho State Bengals | |
Head coach: Abe Lemons (Texas)

East All-Stars
| Pos. | Number | Player | College team | Previous appearances |
Team
| F | #45 | (United States) Larry Bird | Indiana State Sycamores | |
| G | # | (United States) Gary Garland | DePaul Blue Demons | |
| F | #41 | (United States) Wiley Peck | Mississippi State Bulldogs | |
| F | #51 | (United States) Jeff Tropf | Central Michigan Chippewas | |
| F | #53 | (United States) Reggie King | Alabama Crimson Tide | |
| F | #21 | (United States) Terry Duerod | Detroit Mercy Titans | |
| G | # | (United States) Dudley Bradley | North Carolina Tar Heels | |
| G | #15 | (United States) (Greece) Nick Galis | Seton Hall Pirates | |
| F | #55 | (United States) Bruce Flowers | Notre Dame Fighting Irish | |
Head coach: Bill Foster (Duke)

=== Result ===
| Team 1 | Score | Team 2 |
|---|---|---|
| West All-Stars | 92–107 | East All-Stars |

== Awards ==
| MVP | Topscorer |
|---|---|
| (United States) Larry Bird | (United States) Earl Evans |

== Aftermath ==
Players like Larry Bird and Vinnie Johnson moved to the NBA after the 1978–89 season, while Nick Galis signed up for a Greek club and also enjoyed a lengthy and fruitful career with the national team of Greece. On May 5, 1979, Pizza Hut organised another All-Star Classic between Minnesota and Indiana All-Stars.

== See also ==
- 1979 NCAA Men's Basketball All-Americans
- 1973 Pizza Hut All-Star Basketball Classic
- 1982 Pizza Hut All-Star Basketball Classic

== Sources ==
- Stu’s Notes: Bring Back the Pizza Hut Classic
