= Pizza Hut All-Star Basketball Classic =

American college all-star basketball game

College All-Star Basketball Classic
- Status: Inactive
- Inaugurated: 1971–72
- Most recent: 1981–82
- Organizer: NCAA; NAIA; Pizza Hut

The Pizza Hut All-Star Basketball Classic was an annual American all-star game featuring senior men's college basketball players in the United States. The event was sanctioned by the NCAA and NAIA. It started in 1972 and was sponsored by Pizza Hut.

The All-Star Classic drew star players such as Larry Bird, Rolando Blackman, Kevin McHale, Vinnie Johnson, Bo Ellis, Nick Galis, and Ricky Pierce, while some legendary coaches like Larry Brown, Al McGuire, Joe B. Hall, and Ralph Miller, coached the All-Stars. The event lasted for a decade.

== History ==
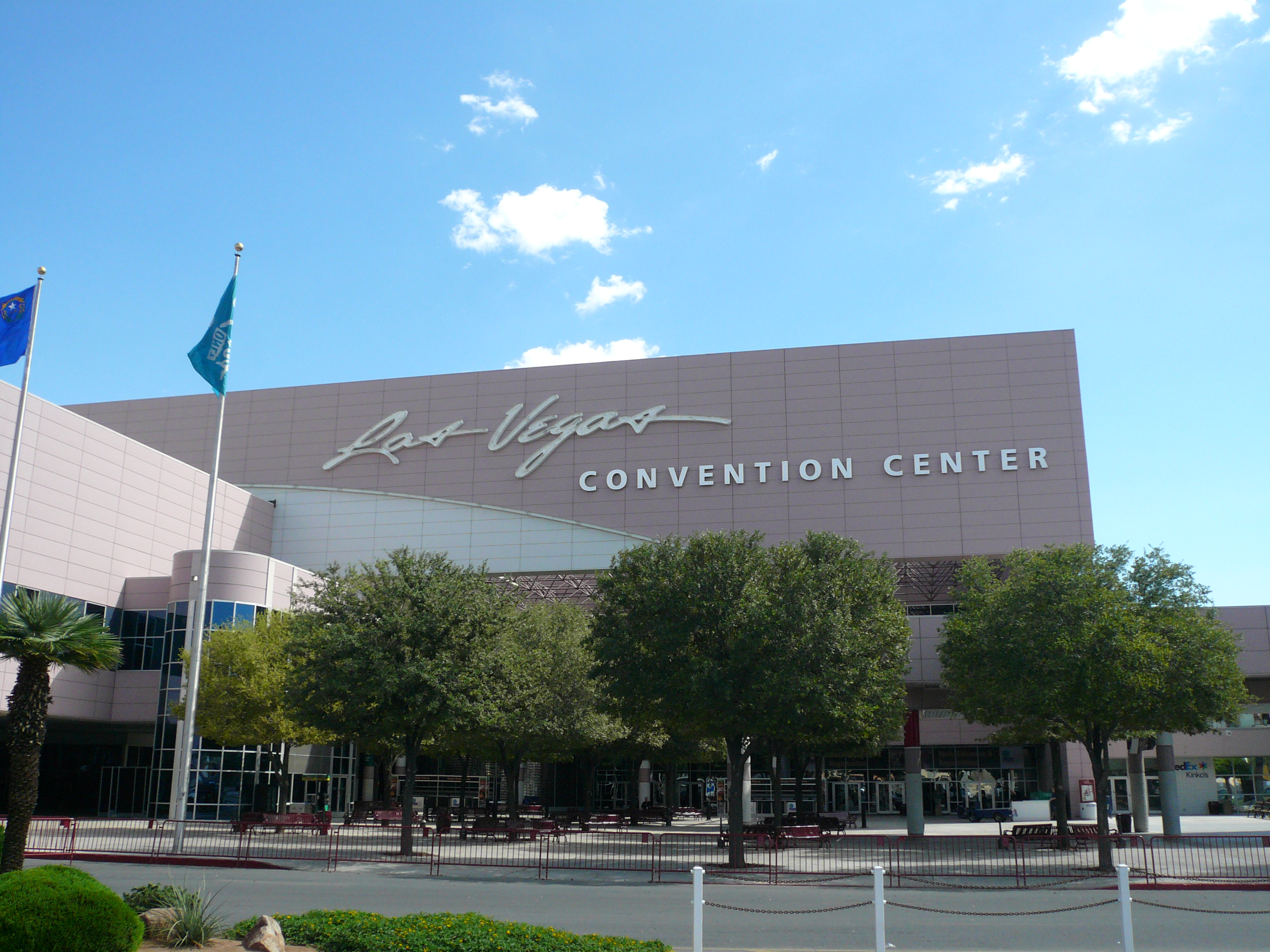
The Las Vegas Convention Center hosted all the editions.

The All-Star Classic was started in 1972 by Pizza Hut with all its proceeds going to charity, the Pizza Hut Charities Foundation. It was held on April 15, 1972, at the Las Vegas Convention Center in Las Vegas. The following editions were also played at the same venue.

Former, Los Angeles Lakers player Elgin Baylor, was the commentator of the first Pizza Hut Basketball Classic which was televised by the CBS.

The game was played annually between East and West selections. Pizza Hut cancelled the Classic after the 1982 edition to explore a "more all-encompassing approach" to their charitable contributions.

Overall, the East recorded 6 wins and the West 5.

== Voting ==
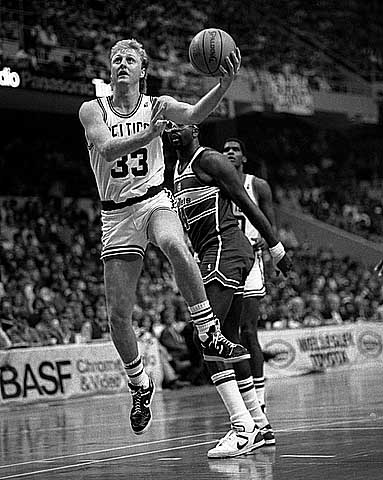
Larry Bird won a record number of votes in 1979.

Eight players of each team (East and West) were elected by popular vote, while the remaining two were selected by a national coaching media panel. The ballots for the players' selection were available at all Pizza Hut restaurants of the country and the participating colleges. USA's top 100 senior College basketball players were eligible for election. The majority of the voted players were also elected as NCAA Men's Basketball All-Americans during the season.

== List of games ==
Bold: Team that won the game.

Season	Venue	Team	Score	Team	MVP
1973	Las Vegas Convention Center	East All-Stars	92–**93**	**West All-Stars**	(Netherlands) Swen Nater
1977	Las Vegas Convention Center	East All-Stars	95–**97**	**West All-Stars**	
1978	Las Vegas Convention Center	East All-Stars	won	**West All-Stars**	
1979	Las Vegas Convention Center	**East All-Stars**	**107**–92	West All-Stars	(United States) Larry Bird
1980	Las Vegas Convention Center	**East All-Stars**	won	West All-Stars	
1981	Las Vegas Convention Center	**East All-Stars**	won	West All-Stars	
1982	Las Vegas Convention Center	East All-Stars	88–**102**	**West All-Stars**	(United States) Ricky Frazier

== Topscorers ==
Season	Player	Points	Team
1979	(United States) Earl Evans	21	UNLV Runnin' Rebels
1982	(United States) Scott Hasting	16	Arkansas Razorbacks

== Notable players ==
- (United States) Kevin McHale
- (United States) Kent Benson
- (United States) Bo Ellis
- (United States) Larry Bird
- (United States) (Greece) Nick Galis
- (United States) Vinnie Johnson
- (United States) Maurice Cheeks
- (Netherlands) Swen Nater
- (United States) Danny Ainge
- (United States) (Panama) Rolando Blackman
- (United States) Danny Vranes
- (United States) Frank Johnson
- (United States) Kelly Tripucka
- (United States) Dave Corzine
- (United States) Matt Hicks
- (United States) Bo Lamar

== Distinctions ==
=== FIBA Hall of Fame ===
- (United States) (Greece) Nick Galis

=== Basketball Hall of Fame ===
- (United States) (Greece) Nick Galis
- (United States) Larry Bird
- (United States) Al McGuire (coach)
- (United States) Larry Brown (coach)
- (United States) Kevin McHale

=== Collegiate Basketball Hall of Fame ===
- (United States) (Panama) Rolando Blackman
- (United States) Larry Bird
- (United States) Al McGuire (coach)
- (United States) Joe B. Hall (coach)
- (United States) Larry Brown (coach)
- (United States) Kevin McHale
- (United States) Fred Taylor (coach)

== See also ==
- Reese's College All-Star Game

== Sources ==
- Stu's Notes: Bring Back the Pizza Hut Classic
