= J. J. Anderson =

American basketball player (born 1960)

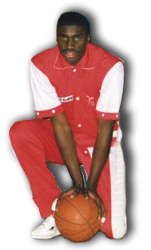
- Anderson with Nuova Pallacanestro Firenze in 1985

Personal information
- Born: September 23, 1960 (age 66) Chicago, Illinois, U.S.
- Listed height: 6 ft 8 in (2.03 m)
- Listed weight: 195 lb (88 kg)

Career information
- High school: Metro (Chicago, Illinois)
- College: Bradley (1978–1982)
- NBA draft: 1982: 2nd round, 36th overall pick
- Drafted by: Philadelphia 76ers
- Playing career: 1982–1999
- Position: Small forward
- Number: 7, 11

Career history
- 1982: Philadelphia 76ers
- 1982–1985: Utah Jazz
- 1985–1991: Nuova Pallacanestro Firenze
- 1991–1992: Zaragoza
- 1992–1993: Aris BC
- 1993–1994: Pallalcesto Amatori Udine
- 1994–1995: Polti Cantù
- 1995–1996: Tau Cerámica

Career highlights
- Saporta Cup champion (1993); MVC Newcomer of the Year (1979); 3× First-team All-MVC (1980–1982); 1x Pizza Hut College All-Star (1982); Second-team All-MVC (1979); No. 11 retired by Bradley Braves
- Stats at NBA.com
- Stats at Basketball Reference

Mitchell Keith "J. J." Anderson (born September 25, 1960) is an American retired professional basketball player in the National Basketball Association (NBA). His position was power forward. He stood at 6'8" and weighed 205 lbs. He lives in Bristol, Wisconsin.

== Early career ==
Before his NBA career he attended Metro High School in Chicago and college at Bradley University from 1978 to 1982. He is one of seven Bradley Braves players to have his jersey number (#11) retired.

== NBA ==
Anderson was selected by the Philadelphia 76ers in the 2nd round (36th overall) of the 1982 NBA draft. He played for Utah Jazz from 1982 to 1985.

== European career ==
Anderson spent 11 years in Europe. He played one season in Spain (CAI Zaragoza) and Greece. In 1993, he won the European Cup, playing for Aris BC. He also played part of a season in Germany, and eight seasons in Italy, most of them in Florence, becoming a star for all the city.

== Career statistics ==
Legend
GP	Games played	GS	Games started	MPG	Minutes per game
FG%	Field goal percentage	3P%	3-point field goal percentage	FT%	Free throw percentage
RPG	Rebounds per game	APG	Assists per game	SPG	Steals per game
BPG	Blocks per game	PPG	Points per game	**Bold**	Career high

=== NBA ===
==== Regular season ====
Year	Team	GP	GS	MPG	FG%	3P%	FT%	RPG	APG	SPG	BPG	PPG
1982–83	Philadelphia	13	0	3.7	.364	.000	.333	.9	.1	.1	.0	1.3
1982–83	Utah	**52**	**2**	**22.2**	**.510**	.000	.576	**5.4**	**1.3**	**1.2**	**.4**	**8.9**
1983–84	Utah	48	0	6.5	.423	.000	.414	1.3	.5	.3	.2	2.5
1984–85	Utah	44	0	10.4	.409	.000	**.600**	1.9	.5	.7	.2	3.4
Career		157	2	12.5	.465	.000	.558	2.8	.7	.7	.2	4.8

==== Playoffs ====
Year	Team	GP	MPG	FG%	3P%	FT%	RPG	APG	SPG	BPG	PPG
1984	Utah	5	2.6	.625	1.000	–	.8	.0	.0	.2	2.2
