= 1982 Pizza Hut All-Star Basketball Classic =

1982 College-organized Basketball All-Star Game

Pizza Hut Basketball All-Star Classic
East All-Stars	West All-Stars
88	102
- Date: April 3, 1982
- Venue: Las Vegas Convention Center, Las Vegas
- MVP: Ricky Frazier
- Network: CBS

The 1982 Pizza Hut Basketball All-Star Classic was the 11th All-Star Game sponsored by Pizza Hut and sanctioned by the NCAA and NAIA. It was held at the Las Vegas Convention Center in Las Vegas on April 3, 1982. The West All-Stars defeated the East All-Stars 102–88.

The Pizza Hut Basketball All-Star Classic started as a postseason event in 1972. It was televised by CBS.

Ricky Frazier was named the MVP.

== Voting ==
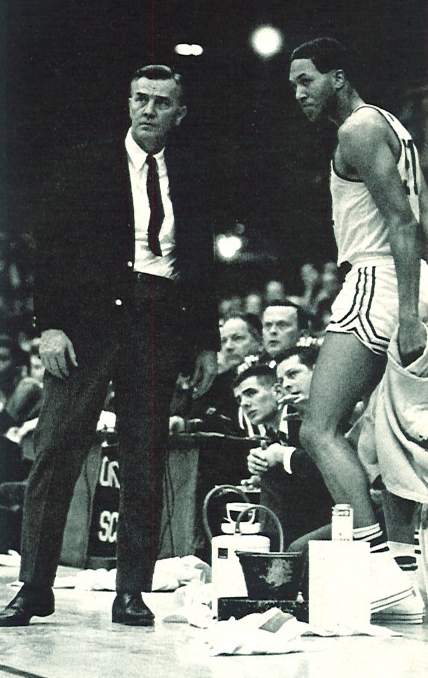
Ralph Miller (left) coached the East All Stars.

Th ballots for the players' selection were available at all Pizza Hut restaurants of the country and the participating colleges. USA's top 100 senior College basketball players were eligible for election.

Eight players of each team (East and West) were elected by popular vote, while the remaining two were selected by a national coaching media panel.

== The 1982 All-Star Game ==
The game was held at the Las Vegas Convention Center in Las Vegas, like in all the previous editions. The 1982 edition featured players like Jimmy Black, Chuck Nevitt and Louisville's Derek Smith.

Pizza Hut sponsored the college all-star classic annually each spring.

=== The Game ===
East All-Stars were up 50–40 at halftime. Ricky Frazier who was named the MVP scored 12 of his 15 points in the second half to help the West All-Stars win the game. It was the first win for the West after three consecutive victories for the East (1979, 1980, 1981).

Scott Hastings of Arkansas was the topscorer with 16 points.

Wallace Bryant of the East scored 14 pts, while McNamara added 13. Others top scorers were: Ricky Pierce 12, Eddie Phillips 13, Vince Taylor 13.

The 1982 College All-Star Basketball Classic was played for charity purposes and all the revenue went to the Pizza Hut Charities Foundation.

== All-Star teams ==
=== Rosters ===
West All-Stars
Pos.	Number	Player	College team	Previous appearances
Team
F	#24	(United States) Ricky Frazier	Missouri Tigers	
F	#34	(United States) Richard Box	Missouri Tigers	
C	#44	(United States) Fred Roberts	BYU Cougars	
G	#20	(United States) Dwight Anderson	USC Trojans	
G	#30	(United States) Trent Tucker	Minnesota Golden GophEers	
C	#40	(United States) Wallace Bryant	San Francisco Dons	
C	#42	(United States) Mark McNamara	California Golden Bears	
G	#32	(United States) Ricky Pierce	Rice Owls	
G	#20	(United States) Lester Conner	Oregon State Beavers	
F	#30	(United States) Paul Pressey	Tulsa Golden Hurricane	
Head coach: Ralph Miller (Oregon State)

East All-Stars
Pos.	Number	Player	College team	Previous appearances
Team
G	#20	(United States) Jimmy Black	North Carolina Tar Heels	
G	#10	(United States) (Italy) Dan Callandrillo	Seton Hall Pirates	
G	#20	(United States) Vince Taylor	Duke Blue Devils	
F	#42	(United States) Corny Thompson	UConn Huskie	
G	#24	(United States) Sleepy Floyd	Georgetown Hoyas	
F	#24	(United States) Scott Hastings	Arkansas Razorbacks	
F	#30	(United States) J. J. Anderson	Bradley Braves	
F	#32	(United States) Eddie Phillips	Alabama Crimson Tide	
C	#25	(United States) Chuck Nevitt	NC State Wolfpack	
G	#44	(United States) Derek Smith	Louisville Cardinals	
Head coach: Joe B. Hall (Kentucky)

=== Result ===
Team 1	Score	Team 2
East All-Stars	102- 88	West All-Stars

== Awards ==
MVP	Topscorer
(United States) Ricky Frazier	(United States) Scott Hastings

== See also ==
- 1979 Pizza Hut All-Star Basketball Classic
- 1982 NCAA Men's Basketball All-Americans
- Reese's College All-Star Game

== Sources ==
- Stu’s Notes: Bring Back the Pizza Hut Classic
- 1982 rosters
