= Jimmy Black (basketball) =

American basketball player and coach

Personal information
- Born: November 20, 1960 (age 66) The Bronx, New York, U.S.
- Listed height: 6 ft 2 in (1.88 m)
- Listed weight: 160 lb (73 kg)

Career information
- High school: Cardinal Hayes (The Bronx, New York)
- College: North Carolina (1978–1982)
- NBA draft: 1982: 3rd round, 59th overall pick
- Drafted by: New Jersey Nets
- Position: Point guard
- Coaching career: 1984–1995

Career history

Coaching
- 1984–1990: Saint Joseph's (assistant)
- 1990–1991: South Carolina (assistant)
- 1991–1995: Notre Dame (assistant)

Career highlights
- NCAA champion (1982)
- Stats at Basketball Reference

Jimmy Black (born November 20, 1960) is an American former college basketball player and assistant coach. He was the starting point guard and a captain of the 1981–82 national champion North Carolina Tar Heels men's basketball team.

== College career ==
Black led his team and was considered the top defender on his team. He served as his team's quarterback.

Black played in the NCAA Tournament all four years at UNC. As the playmaker on the 1981–82 championship team, he was responsible for directing the ball to teammates James Worthy, Sam Perkins and freshman swingman Michael Jordan. Black had a close relationship with coach Dean Smith.

Black's mother died during his sophomore season at UNC.

=== 1981–82 season ===
Along with the likes of Dale Ellis, Patrick Ewing, and Clark Kellogg, Black was among 22 Honorable Mentions for the 1982 UPI (United Press International) All-America Team. Black was selected to play in the Pizza Hut East-West All-Star Classic in Las Vegas on April 3, 1982, along with such contemporaries as Chuck Nevitt and Louisville's Derek Smith.

Prior to the 1982 tournament, Black called a special team meeting, a sort of pep rally, to pump up the team, focusing on Dean Smith's six Final Four appearances without a title. During the tournament, Black was named to the East Regional All-Star Team with per game averages of 11.3 points on 88% shooting from the field to go with 6.7 assists in three games.

In the national semifinal, Black guarded the University of Houston's Rob Williams so well that he did not score a field goal (0–8).

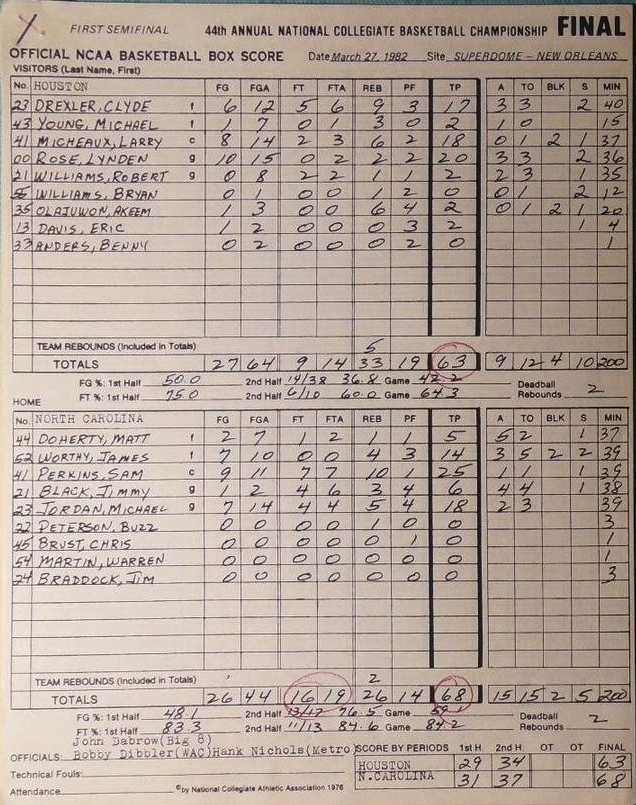
Box score for Jimmy Black's fine defensive job on Rob Williams in the 1982 NCAA Tournament

In the national championship game, Black had 4 points, 3 rebounds, 7 assists and a steal in 38 minutes, including the pass to Michael Jordan for the game-winning shot.

== College statistics ==
Year	Team	GP	GS	MPG	FG%	3P%	FT%	RPG	APG	SPG	BPG	PPG
1978–79	North Carolina	29			.479	—	.621	.7	1.3	0.4	0.0	2.2
1979–80	North Carolina	27			.451	—	.677	.6	3.1	1.6	0.3	5.0
1980–81	North Carolina	37			.533	—	.788	1.5	5.1	1.7	0.0	7.3
1981–82	North Carolina	34			.513	—	.738	1.7	6.3	1.7	0.2	7.6
Career		127		22.8	.504	—	.734	1.2	4.1	1.4	0.1	5.7

=== 1982 tournament log ===
Opponent	FGM	FGA	FTM	FTA	AST	STL	TOV	PF	PTS
James Madison	4	4	1	4	4	2	0	4	9
Alabama	6	7	2	4	6	0	4	1	14
Villanova	4	5	3	4	10	2	2	2	11
Houston	1	2	4	6	4	1	4	4	6
Georgetown	1	4	2	2	7	1	2	2	4

== After college ==
Black was the 59th pick in the 1982 NBA draft, but he did not play in the NBA. He did sign waivers with the New Jersey Nets, but was waived on October 25, 1982, near the final cut for the team.

After his playing days, Black worked as a graduate assistant at UNC in the 1983–84 season, and then as an assistant coach at several colleges: Saint Joseph's, South Carolina and Notre Dame. In 1995, Black resigned from his position at Notre Dame and was replaced by Parker Laketa.

== Personal life ==
In 1995, Black was arrested on a misdemeanor domestic violence charge for purportedly striking his fiancée on the leg on December 13, 1994. This followed previous incidents, including an October 1994 police report in which Black's fiancée was treated at a hospital for a black eye and other injuries.
