= Eric Johnson (basketball) =

American-Spanish basketball player (born 1966)

Personal information
- Born: February 7, 1966 (age 60) Brooklyn, New York, U.S.
- Listed height: 6 ft 2 in (1.88 m)
- Listed weight: 205 lb (93 kg)

Career information
- High school: Franklin Delano Roosevelt (Brooklyn, New York)
- College: Baylor (1984–1986); Nebraska (1987–1989)
- NBA draft: 1989: undrafted
- Playing career: 1989–2003
- Position: Point guard
- Number: 15

Career history
- 1989–1990: Utah Jazz
- 1990–1991: Halifax Windjammers
- 1991: Rapid City Thrillers
- 1991–1992: Birmingham Bandits
- 1992–1994: Valencia
- 1995: Yakima Sun Kings
- 1995: Chicago Rockers
- 1995: Chorale Roanne
- 1996: Besançon BCD
- 1996–1997: Valencia
- 1997–1998: Andino Sport Club
- 1999: Valencia
- 1999–2000: Girona
- 2000–2001: Gijón Baloncesto
- 2001–2002: Lokomotiv Vody
- 2002–2003: Galicia Ferrol
- Stats at NBA.com
- Stats at Basketball Reference

Eric Johnson Jones (born February 7, 1966) is an American-Spanish former professional basketball player who had a brief career in the National Basketball Association (NBA) for the Utah Jazz during the 1989–90 season.

== Personal life ==
Born in Brooklyn, New York, Eric is brother of Vinnie Johnson.
