= Franklin Delano Roosevelt High School (New York City) =

Public school in New York City

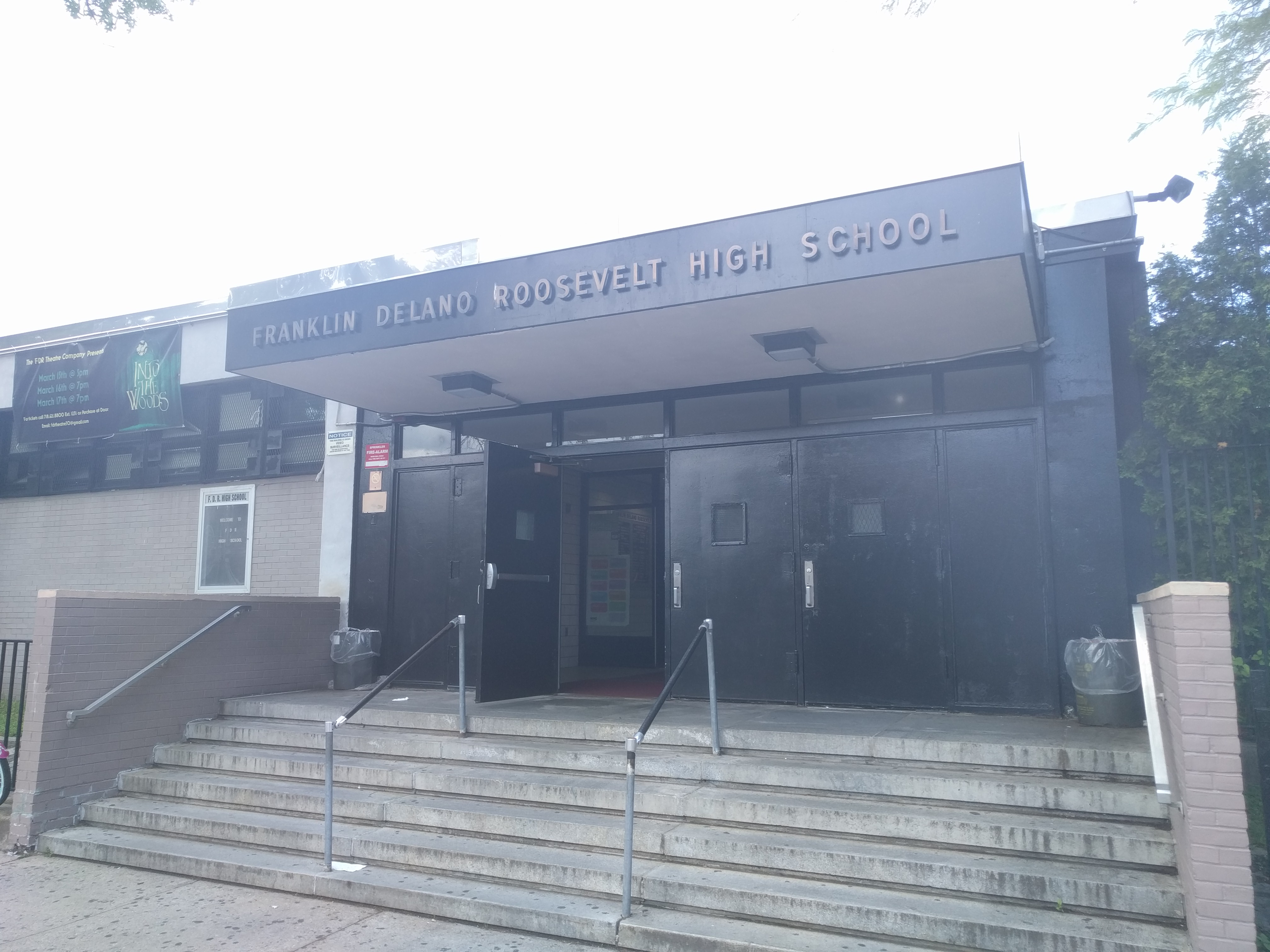

Location
- 5800 20th Ave; New York, New York 11204; United States; 40.62135°N 73.98263°W

Information
- Type: Public
- Established: 1965
- School district: New York City Department of Education
- Superintendent: Michael Prayor
- NCES School ID: 360015101947
- Principal: Andrea Repole
- Teaching staff: 247.70 (on an FTE basis)
- Grades: 9-12
- Enrollment: 3,430 (2023-2024)
- Student to teacher ratio: 13.85
- Campus: City: Large
- Colors: Red and White
- Mascot: Cougars
- Newspaper: The New Dealer
- Yearbook: Sojourn
- Website: www.fdrhs.org

Franklin Delano Roosevelt High School is a coeducational public high school in New York City, located at 5800 20th Avenue in the borough of Brooklyn. It is a zoned/public high school, with an enrollment of approximately 3,400 students, encompassing grades 9–12. In total, the school includes 280,717 sq feet of class space, gyms, cafeteria, and auditorium.

== Programs ==
The Brooklyn school offers Art, Business, Computers, Music, Social Sciences and Physical Education. Their foreign language programs include Chinese and Spanish. The school offers 18 AP classes.

The school also provides Instructional Support Services for students such as Collaborative Team Teaching (CTT) classes, SETSS classes, and Bilingual classrooms. FDR High School also has a rigorous honors program, for example, Honors Algebra 1, Honors Chemistry, Honors Geometry, Honors Sophomore English, Honors Physics, Honors Algebra 2/Trigonometry, Honors Participation in Government, Honors Economics, and a special class called "Pre-Calculus for Juniors only" a class offered to students who have taken Algebra 1 in eighth grade.

FDR is also home to an alternative program called the Young Adult Borough Center (YABC) that provides over-aged and under-credited high school students with alternative means to obtain their high school diploma. Classes are offered in the evenings Monday through Thursday and students in good academic standing are provided a paid internship during the day.

== Extracurricular activities ==
=== Sports ===
The Roosevelt High School offers a number of athletic activities for its students. For boys, they offer baseball, varsity and junior varsity basketball, bowling, football, handball, outdoor track, cricket, table tennis, soccer, tennis, volleyball, and wrestling. At the same time, girls have available basketball, bowling, handball, soccer, softball, tennis, and volleyball. The Girls Tennis Team won the 2011 PSAL Championship. The Cricket Team won the 2010 and 2011 PSAL Championship. The school has recently launched a dance team. Roosevelt has weight training and cardio facilities, as well as a gym and exercise equipment. Roosevelt received a grant for a few million dollars and built a field for sports and other events. In the spring of 2014, coach Yellen founded the FDR Badminton team. Throughout the year, the badminton team won 10–0 in the city tournaments, and in addition, won 2–0 in the state finals. FDR High School's badminton team was the first-ever recipient of the PSAL Badminton cup.

== Notable alumni ==
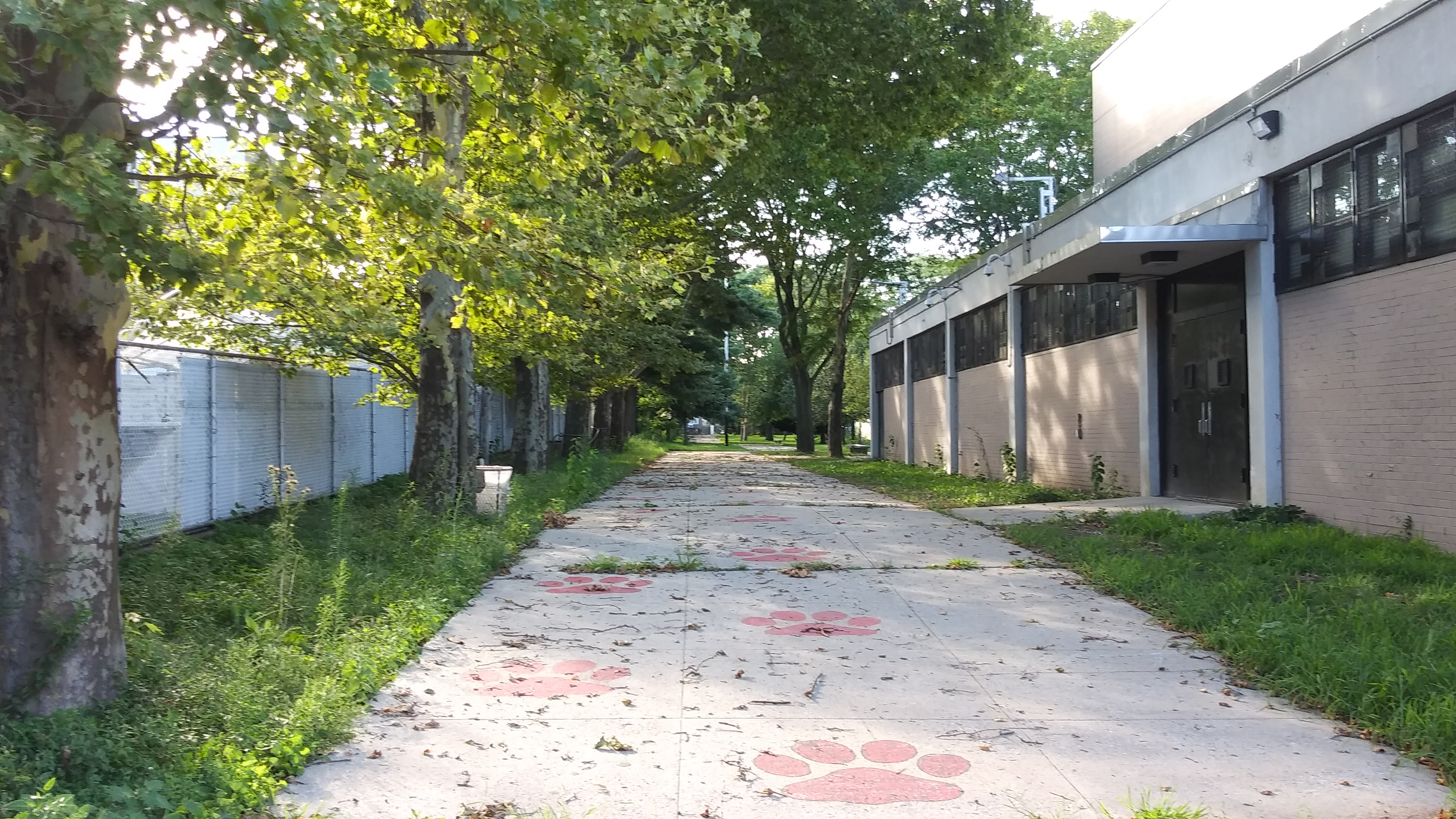
Green passage between 19th and 20 avenues. Sometimes open to the public

- Eric Johnson (born 1966) wasa former professional basketball player who had a brief career in the NBA for the Utah Jazz.
- Vinnie Johnson (born 1956) was a professional basketball player (1979–92).
- Daniella Karagach (born 1992), professional dancer
- Dennis Raphael, Professor of Health Policy and Management at York University in Toronto
- Alex Vindman (born 1975), U.S. Army lieutenant colonel and Director for European Affairs for the United States National Security Council testified in November 2019 before the United States Congress regarding the Trump–Ukraine scandal.

== See also ==
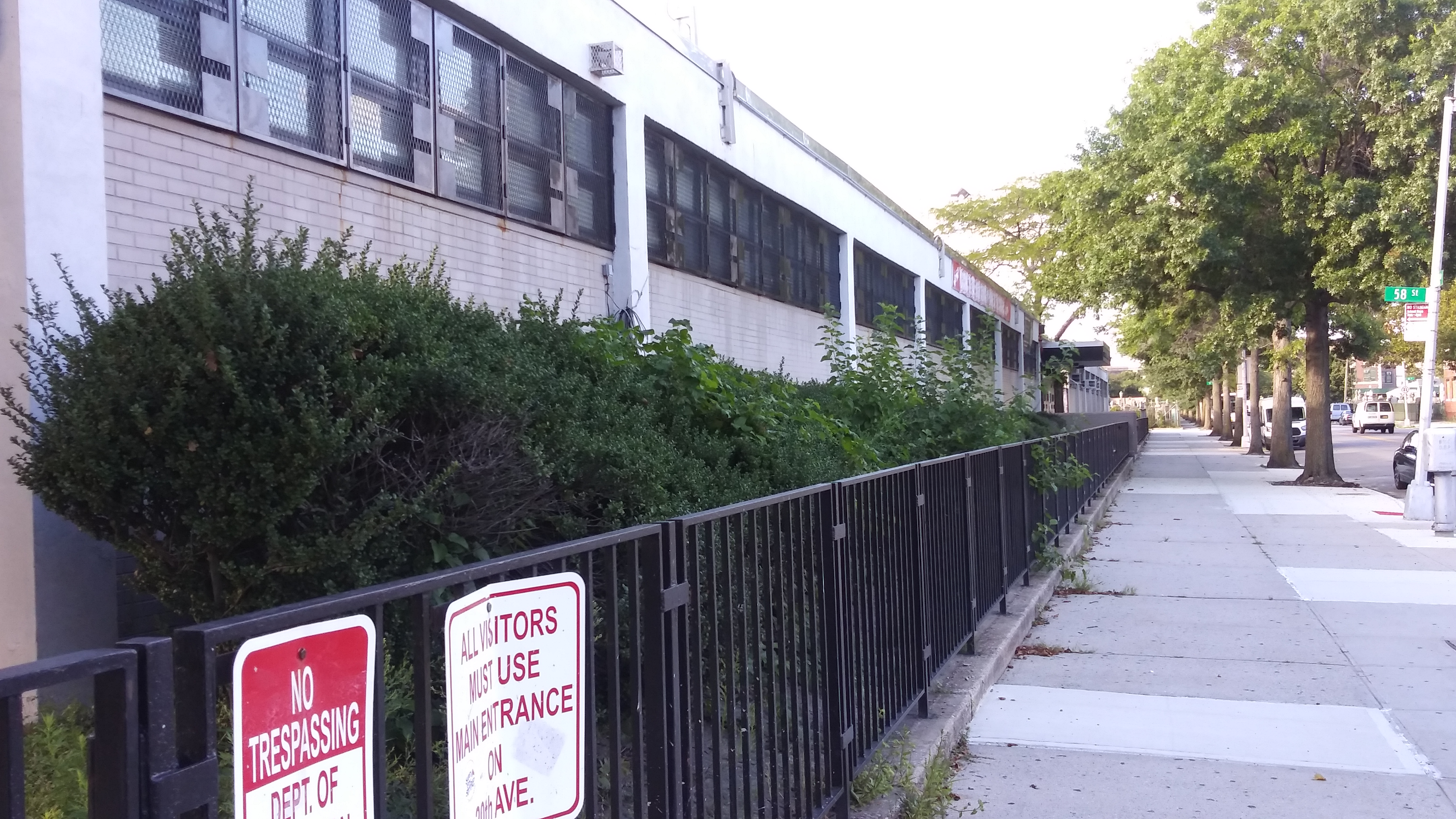
Main entrance to the school is located on a corner of 20th avenue & 58th street

- List of high schools in New York City
- New York City Department of Education
