= 1973 Pizza Hut All-Star Basketball Classic =

1973 College-organized Basketball All-Star Game

Pizza Hut Basketball All-Star Classic
East All-Stars	West All-Stars
92	93
- Date: April 14, 1973
- Venue: Las Vegas Convention Center, Las Vegas
- MVP: Swen Nater
- Network: CBS

The 1973 Pizza Hut Basketball All-Star Classic was the 2nd All-Star Game sponsored by Pizza Hut and sanctioned by the NCAA and NAIA. It was held at the Las Vegas Convention Center in Las Vegas on April 14, 1973. The West All-Stars defeated the East All-Stars 102–88.

The Pizza Hut Basketball All-Star Classic started as a postseason event in 1972. It was televised by CBS.

Swen Nater was named the MVP.

== Voting ==
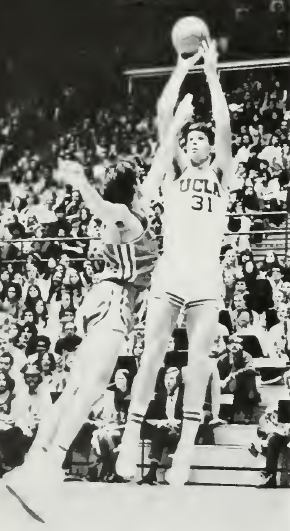
Swen Nater of the West All Stars won the MVP award.

Th ballots for the players' selection were available at all Pizza Hut restaurants of the country and the participating colleges. USA's top 100 senior College basketball players were eligible for election.

Eight players of each team (East and West) were elected by popular vote, while the remaining two were selected by a national coaching media panel. Ruben Triplett received most of votes in the ballotting.

== The 1973 All-Star Game ==
The game was held at the Las Vegas Convention Center in Las Vegas, like in the first edition. The 1973 edition featured players like Swen Nater, Ruben Triplett, Allan Bristow and Larry Hollyfield

Pizza Hut sponsored the college all-star classic annually each spring.

=== The Game ===
Dutch center Swen Nater with 23 rebounds led the West to the victory with 93-92. The West was coached by Bob Boyd in a game that was decided at the end, as during the last five minutes, the East reduced West's 14-point lead to five.

The 1973 College All-Star Basketball Classic was played for charity purposes, and all the revenue went to the Pizza Hut Charities Foundation.

== All-Star teams ==
=== Rosters ===
West All-Stars
Pos.	Number	Player	College team	Previous appearances
Team
F	#30	(Netherlands) Swen Nater	UCLA Bruins	
C	#44	(United States) Steve Mitchell	Kansas State Wildcats	
G	#40	(United States) Larry Hollyfield	UCLA Bruins	
G	#34	(United States) Doug Little	Oregon Ducks	
F	#32	(United States) Bob Lauriski	Utah State Aggies	
F	#2	(United States) Larry Moore	Florida State Seminoles	
F	#20	(United States) Mike Bayer	California Golden Bears	
F	#14	(United States) Ruben Triplett	Rice Owls	
F	#42	(United States) Ed Ratleff	Long Beach State Beach	
G	#10	(United States) Richie Fuqua	Oral Roberts Golden Eagles	
Head coach: Bob Boyd (Southern California)

East All-Stars
Pos.	Number	Player	College team	Previous appearances
Team
F	#43	(United States) Allan Bristow	Virginia Tech Hokies	
C	#45	(United States) Jim Andrews	Kentucky Wildcats	
F	#41	(United States) Steve Downing	Indiana Hoosiers	
C	#35	(United States) Luke Witte	Ohio State Buckeyes	
G	#33	(United States) Allan Hornyak	Ohio State Buckeyes	
F	#31	(United States) Nick Weatherspoon	Illinois Fighting Illini	
G	#25	(United States) Doug Collins	Illinois State Redbirds	
G	#23	(United States) Allie McGuire	Marquette Golden Eagles	
G	#21	(United States) Larry Finch	Memphis Tigers	
G	#11	(United States) Dwight Lamar	Louisiana Ragin' Cajuns	
Head coach: Fred Taylor (Ohio State)

=== Result ===
Team 1	Score	Team 2
East All-Stars	92- 93	West All-Stars

== Awards ==
MVP	Topscorer
(Netherlands) Swen Nater	

== See also ==
- 1979 Pizza Hut All-Star Basketball Classic
- 1973 NCAA Men's Basketball All-Americans

== Sources ==
- Stu’s Notes: Bring Back the Pizza Hut Classic
- 1973 rosters
