= 1987 NBA playoffs =

Postseason tournament

Tournament details
- Dates: April 23–June 14, 1987
- Season: 1986–87
- Teams: 16

Final positions
- Champions: Los Angeles Lakers (10th title)
- Runners-up: Boston Celtics
- Semifinalists: Seattle SuperSonics; Detroit Pistons

Tournament statistics
- Scoring leader(s): Larry Bird (Celtics) (27.0 PPG)

Awards
- MVP: Magic Johnson (Lakers)

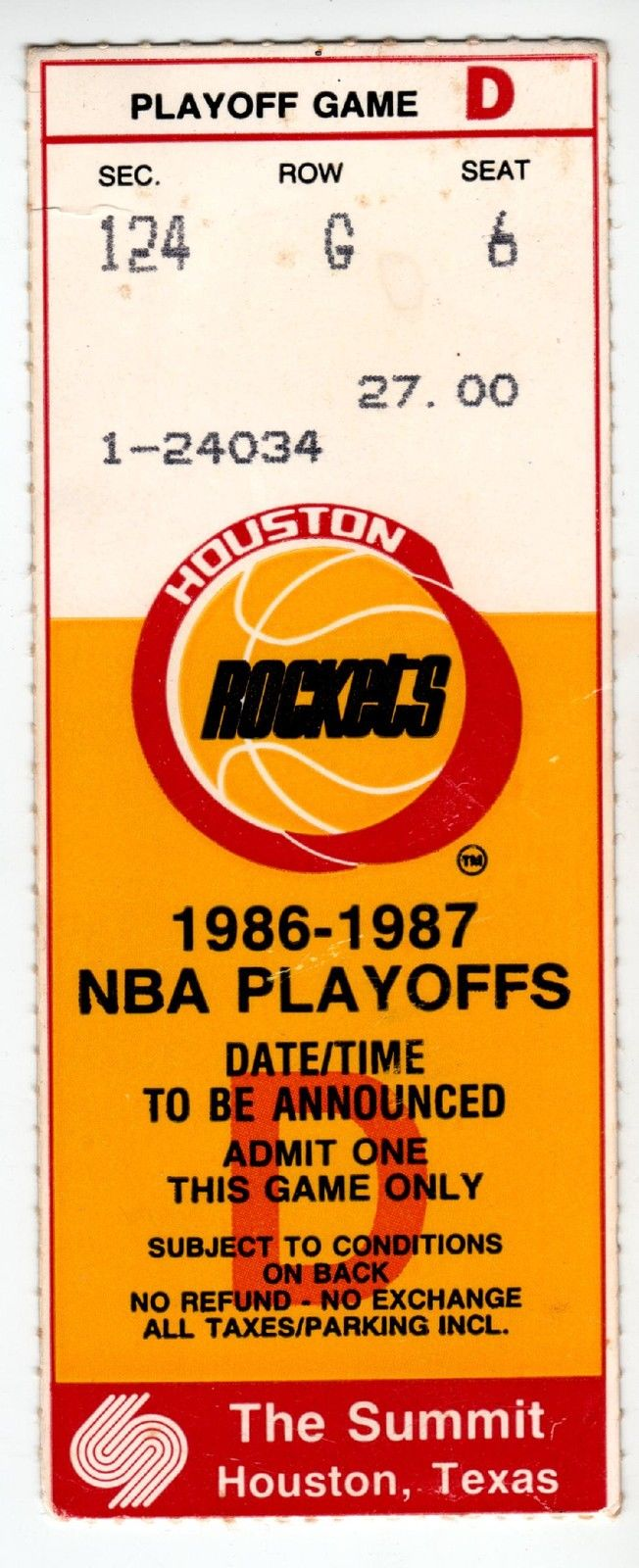
A ticket for Game 2 of the 1987 Western Conference Semifinals between the Houston Rockets and the Seattle SuperSonics.

The 1987 NBA playoffs was the postseason tournament of the National Basketball Association's 1986–87 season. The tournament concluded with the Western Conference champion Los Angeles Lakers defeating the Eastern Conference champion Boston Celtics 4 games to 2 in the NBA Finals. The Lakers earned their 10th NBA championship, and Magic Johnson was named NBA Finals MVP for a then-record third time.

This was the last time the Celtics would appear in the NBA Finals until 2008. Boston only advanced as far as the Conference Finals twice in that stretch: losing the following year to the Detroit Pistons in six games and in 2002 to the New Jersey Nets, also in 6 games.

The Pistons appearance in the Eastern Conference Finals was the franchise's first (and their first Division/Conference Final appearance since 1962). It would be the first of five straight Conference Finals appearances for Detroit. They would make their first NBA Finals appearance since 1956 the following season, the first of 3 straight trips to the Finals (winning the last 2).

The Warriors & Pacers made their first playoff appearances since 1977 and 1981 respectively. The Pacers also won their first NBA playoff game, in Game 3 of their first-round series against the Hawks.

Game 5 of the Philadelphia/Milwaukee series would the final game of Julius Erving's career.

By beating Dallas 3–1, the SuperSonics became the first #7 seed to defeat a #2 seed since the playoffs expanded to 16 teams in 1984. They reached the Western Conference Finals, where they were swept by the Lakers. As of 2026, they are the most recent team with a sub-.500 record (39–43) to win a playoff series. The 1989 & 1991 Warriors, 1998 Knicks, 2010 Spurs and 2023 Lakers were the other 7th seeds to beat the 2nd seed.

One of the most memorable moments of the playoffs occurred in the final moments of Game 5 of the Eastern Conference Finals when, with Boston down 107–106, Isiah Thomas had his inbounds pass stolen by Larry Bird, who passed to Dennis Johnson for the game-winning layup.

The only dent in the Lakers' run to the Finals came in Game 4 of the Western Conference Semifinals against the Warriors, when Sleepy Floyd scored a playoff record 39 points in the second half, with a record 29 coming in the fourth quarter, to seal a 129–121 win. Both records still stand.

This was last time a 7 seed went to the Western Conference Finals until 2023 when the Los Angeles Lakers were swept by the Denver Nuggets in 4 games.

== Bracket ==
First Round	Conference Semifinals
E1	Boston*	3
E8	Chicago	0
E1	Boston*	4
E4	Milwaukee	3
E4	Milwaukee	3
E5	Philadelphia	2
Eastern Conference
E3	Detroit	3
E6	Washington	0
E3	Detroit	4
E2	Atlanta*	1
E2	Atlanta*	3
E7	Indiana	1
W1	LA Lakers*	3
W8	Denver	0
W1	LA Lakers*	4
W5	Golden State	1
W4	Utah	2
W5	Golden State	3
Western Conference
W3	Portland	1
W6	Houston	3
W6	Houston	2
W7	Seattle	4
W2	Dallas*	1
W7	Seattle	3

Conference Finals
E1	Boston*	4
E3	Detroit	3
W1	LA Lakers*	4
W7	Seattle	0

NBA Finals
E1	Boston*	2
W1	LA Lakers*	4

- * Division winner
- Bold Series winner
- Italic Team with home-court advantage

== First round ==
=== Eastern Conference first round ===
==== (1) Boston Celtics vs. (8) Chicago Bulls ====
April 23

Boxscore

Chicago Bulls 104, Boston Celtics 108
Scoring by quarter: 24–34, 23–32, 26–20, 31–22
Pts: Michael Jordan 35; Rebs: Charles Oakley 12; Asts: Michael Jordan 7	Pts: Kevin McHale 21; Rebs: Robert Parish 11; Asts: Larry Bird 13
Boston leads series, 1–0

Boston Garden, Boston, Massachusetts
Attendance: 14,890
Referees: Jack Madden, Tommy Nunez Sr., Mike Lauerman

April 26

Boxscore

Chicago Bulls 96, Boston Celtics 105
Scoring by quarter: 30–30, 18–26, 29–26, 19–23
Pts: Michael Jordan 42; Rebs: Charles Oakley 15; Asts: Jordan, Threatt 4 each	Pts: Larry Bird 29; Rebs: McHale, Parish 10 each Asts: Larry Bird 8
Boston leads series, 2–0

Boston Garden, Boston, Massachusetts
Attendance: 14,890
Referees: Ed T. Rush, Lee Jones

April 28

Boxscore

Boston Celtics 105, Chicago Bulls 94
Scoring by quarter: 28–28, 23–24, 17–21, 37–21
Pts: Larry Bird 32; Rebs: Larry Bird 14; Asts: Dennis Johnson 10	Pts: Michael Jordan 30; Rebs: Charles Oakley 19; Asts: Michael Jordan 7
Boston wins series, 3–0

Chicago Stadium, Chicago, Illinois
Attendance: 18,122
Referees: Hugh Evans, John Vanak

Regular-season series
Boston won 6–0 in the regular-season series

November 14, 1986

Recap

Boston Celtics 110, Chicago Bulls 98

Chicago Stadium, Chicago, Illinois

January 2, 1987

Recap

Chicago Bulls 99, Boston Celtics 113

Boston Garden, Boston

January 27, 1987

Recap

Boston Celtics 105, Chicago Bulls 97

Chicago Stadium, Chicago, Illinois

January 28, 1987

Recap

Chicago Bulls 103, Boston Celtics 132

Boston Garden, Boston

March 27, 1987

Recap

Boston Celtics 111, Chicago Bulls 106

Chicago Stadium, Chicago, Illinois

April 17, 1987

Recap

Chicago Bulls 105, Boston Celtics 108

Boston Garden, Boston

This was the third playoff meeting between these two teams, with the Celtics winning the first two meetings.

Previous playoff series
Boston leads 2–0 in all-time playoff series

1981

Boston Celtics 4, Chicago Bulls 0

1981 Eastern Conference Semifinals

1986

Boston Celtics 3, Chicago Bulls 0

1986 Eastern Conference First Round

==== (2) Atlanta Hawks vs. (7) Indiana Pacers ====
April 24

Boxscore

Indiana Pacers 94, Atlanta Hawks 110
Scoring by quarter: 25–24, 26–30, 16–21, 27–35
Pts: Steve Stipanovich 22; Rebs: Steve Stipanovich 13; Asts: Vern Fleming 6	Pts: Dominique Wilkins 35; Rebs: Tree Rollins 11; Asts: Spud Webb 9
Atlanta leads series, 1–0

Omni Coliseum, Atlanta, Georgia
Attendance: 16,522
Referees: Ed T. Rush, Hue Hollins

April 26

Boxscore

Indiana Pacers 93, Atlanta Hawks 94
Scoring by quarter: 26–23, 23–27, 21–21, 23–23
Pts: Chuck Person 24; Rebs: Herb Williams 8 Asts: Williams, Fleming 4 each	Pts: Dominique Wilkins 43; Rebs: Kevin Willis 10; Asts: Spud Webb 14
Atlanta leads series, 2–0

Omni Coliseum, Atlanta, Georgia
Attendance: 16,522
Referees: Earl Strom, Tommy Nunez Sr.

April 29

Boxscore

Atlanta Hawks 87, Indiana Pacers 96
Scoring by quarter: 16–27, 21–19, 25–23, 25–27
Pts: Dominique Wilkins 22; Rebs: Kevin Willis 7 Asts: Doc Rivers 10	Pts: Chuck Person 23; Rebs: Chuck Person 17; Asts: Chuck Person 7
Atlanta leads series, 2–1

Market Square Arena, Indianapolis, Indiana
Attendance: 12,303
Referees: Jack Madden, Mike Mathis

May 1

Boxscore

Atlanta Hawks 101, Indiana Pacers 97
Scoring by quarter: 16–20, 27–21, 29–32, 29–24
Pts: Dominique Wilkins 30; Rebs: Dominique Wilkins 9 Asts: Doc Rivers 15	Pts: Chuck Person 40; Rebs: Vern Fleming 11; Asts: Vern Fleming 8
Atlanta wins series, 3–1

Market Square Arena, Indianapolis, Indiana
Attendance: 14,039
Referees: Jess Kersey, Joe Crawford, Lee Jones

Regular-season series
Tied 3–3 in the regular-season series

December 5, 1986

Recap

Atlanta Hawks 113, Indiana Pacers 119

Market Square Arena, Indianapolis

January 27, 1987

Recap

Indiana Pacers 98, Atlanta Hawks 114

The Omni, Atlanta

February 20, 1987

Recap

Indiana Pacers 107, Atlanta Hawks 105

The Omni, Atlanta

March 3, 1987

Recap

Atlanta Hawks 109, Indiana Pacers 108

Market Square Arena, Indianapolis

March 28, 1987

Recap

Indiana Pacers 120, Atlanta Hawks 114

The Omni, Atlanta

April 13, 1987

Recap

Atlanta Hawks 102, Indiana Pacers 101

Market Square Arena, Indianapolis

This was the first playoff meeting between the Hawks and the Pacers.

==== (3) Detroit Pistons vs. (6) Washington Bullets ====
April 24

Boxscore

Washington Bullets 92, Detroit Pistons 106
Scoring by quarter: 24–26, 21–31, 28–23, 19–26
Pts: Terry Catledge 24; Rebs: Malone, Catledge 12 each Asts: Moses Malone 3	Pts: Isiah Thomas 34; Rebs: Laimbeer, Rodman 10 each Asts: Isiah Thomas 9
Detroit leads series, 1–0

Pontiac Silverdome, Pontiac, Michigan
Attendance: 15,419
Referees: Earl Strom, Bill Oakes, Tommy Nunez Sr.

April 26

Boxscore

Washington Bullets 85, Detroit Pistons 128
Scoring by quarter: 22–36, 14–40, 31–29, 18–23
Pts: Terry Catledge 19; Rebs: Moses Malone 10; Asts: Ennis Whatley 4	Pts: Adrian Dantley 24; Rebs: Bill Laimbeer 9 Asts: Vinnie Johnson 13
Detroit leads series, 2–0

Pontiac Silverdome, Pontiac, Michigan
Attendance: 14,389
Referees: Darell Garretson, Hue Hollins, Bernie Fryer

April 29

Boxscore

Detroit Pistons 97, Washington Bullets 96
Scoring by quarter: 27–27, 27–28, 24–16, 19–25
Pts: Dantley, Johnson 21 each Rebs: Rick Mahorn 12; Asts: Isiah Thomas 10	Pts: Moses Malone 31; Rebs: Moses Malone 16; Asts: Michael Adams 8
Detroit wins series, 3–0

Capital Centre, Landover, Maryland
Attendance: 10,831
Referees: Paul Mihalak, Jess Kersey, James Capers Sr.

Regular-season series
Tied 3–3 in the regular-season series

November 5, 1986

Recap

Washington Bullets 85, Detroit Pistons 109

Pontiac Silverdome, Pontiac, Michigan

November 19, 1986

Recap

Detroit Pistons 105, Washington Bullets 119

Capital Centre, Landover, Maryland

December 12, 1986

Recap

Washington Bullets 116, Detroit Pistons 115

Pontiac Silverdome, Pontiac, Michigan

December 27, 1986

Recap

Detroit Pistons 107, Washington Bullets 105

Capital Centre, Landover, Maryland

January 29, 1987

Recap

Washington Bullets 101, Detroit Pistons 112

Pontiac Silverdome, Pontiac, Michigan

April 12, 1987

Recap

Detroit Pistons 98, Washington Bullets 103

Capital Centre, Landover, Maryland

This was the first playoff meeting between the Pistons and the Bullets.

==== (4) Milwaukee Bucks vs. (5) Philadelphia 76ers ====
April 24

Boxscore

Philadelphia 76ers 104, Milwaukee Bucks 107
Scoring by quarter: 25–24, 26–27, 33–34, 20–22
Pts: Charles Barkley 21; Rebs: Charles Barkley 13; Asts: Cheeks, Toney 9 each	Pts: Terry Cummings 21; Rebs: Jack Sikma 11; Asts: Paul Pressey 10
Milwaukee leads series, 1–0

MECCA Arena, Milwaukee, Wisconsin
Attendance: 11,052
Referees: Darell Garretson, Lee Jones

April 26

Boxscore

Philadelphia 76ers 125, Milwaukee Bucks 122 (OT)
Scoring by quarter: 26–31, 23–22, 29–31, 30–24, Overtime: 17–14
Pts: Roy Hinson 28; Rebs: Charles Barkley 15; Asts: Maurice Cheeks 11	Pts: Ricky Pierce 24; Rebs: Randy Breuer 9 Asts: Paul Pressey 9
Series tied, 1–1

MECCA Arena, Milwaukee, Wisconsin
Attendance: 11,052
Referees: Mike Mathis, Jess Kersey

April 29

Boxscore

Milwaukee Bucks 121, Philadelphia 76ers 120
Scoring by quarter: 25–25, 23–32, 37–38, 36–25
Pts: Terry Cummings 26; Rebs: Jack Sikma 12; Asts: John Lucas 9	Pts: Charles Barkley 39; Rebs: Cliff Robinson 10; Asts: Cheeks, Toney 8 each
Milwaukee leads series, 2–1

Spectrum, Philadelphia, Pennsylvania
Attendance: 14,361

- Jack Sikma gets his shot blocked, jumps back up, catches the ball in mid-air and line-drives it in with 2 seconds left for the game-winner.

May 1

Boxscore

Milwaukee Bucks 118, Philadelphia 76ers 124
Scoring by quarter: 29–18, 28–34, 23–32, 38–40
Pts: Terry Cummings 29; Rebs: Jack Sikma 13; Asts: John Lucas 10	Pts: Charles Barkley 25; Rebs: Charles Barkley 13; Asts: Maurice Cheeks 11
Series tied, 2–2

Spectrum, Philadelphia, Pennsylvania
Attendance: 15,464
Referees: Jack Madden, Paul Mihalak

May 3

Boxscore

Philadelphia 76ers 89, Milwaukee Bucks 102
Scoring by quarter: 22–29, 28–24, 17–21, 22–28
Pts: Julius Erving 24; Rebs: Charles Barkley 13; Asts: Cheeks, Wingate 5 each	Pts: Jack Sikma 18; Rebs: Jack Sikma 21; Asts: Paul Pressey 9
Milwaukee wins series, 3–2

MECCA Arena, Milwaukee, Wisconsin
Attendance: 11,052
Referees: Earl Strom, Ed T. Rush

- Julius Erving's final NBA game.

Regular-season series
Philadelphia won 3–2 in the regular-season series

November 5, 1986

Recap

Milwaukee Bucks 101, Philadelphia 76ers 107

Spectrum, Philadelphia

December 3, 1986

Recap

Milwaukee Bucks 110, Philadelphia 76ers 115 (OT)

Spectrum, Philadelphia

December 16, 1986

Recap

Philadelphia 76ers 91, Milwaukee Bucks 103

MECCA Arena, Milwaukee

March 21, 1987

Recap

Philadelphia 76ers 105, Milwaukee Bucks 102

MECCA Arena, Milwaukee, Wisconsin

April 15, 1987

Recap

Philadelphia 76ers 95, Milwaukee Bucks 128

MECCA Arena, Milwaukee

This was the seventh playoff meeting between these two teams, with the 76ers winning four of the first six meetings.

Previous playoff series
Philadelphia leads 4–2 in all-time playoff series

1970

Milwaukee Bucks 4, Philadelphia 76ers 1

1970 Eastern Division Semifinals

1981

Milwaukee Bucks 3, Philadelphia 76ers 4

1981 Eastern Conference Semifinals

1982

Milwaukee Bucks 2, Philadelphia 76ers 4

1982 Eastern Conference Semifinals

1983

Milwaukee Bucks 1, Philadelphia 76ers 4

1983 Eastern Conference Finals

1985

Milwaukee Bucks 0, Philadelphia 76ers 4

1985 Eastern Conference Semifinals

1986

Milwaukee Bucks 4, Philadelphia 76ers 3

1986 Eastern Conference Semifinals

=== Western Conference first round ===
==== (1) Los Angeles Lakers vs. (8) Denver Nuggets ====
April 23

Boxscore

Denver Nuggets 95, Los Angeles Lakers 128
Scoring by quarter: 32–39, 21–43, 20–30, 22–16
Pts: Blair Rasmussen 26; Rebs: Blair Rasmussen 13; Asts: Fat Lever 9	Pts: James Worthy 28; Rebs: Mychal Thompson 9 Asts: Magic Johnson 14
LA Lakers lead series, 1–0

The Forum, Inglewood, California
Attendance: 17,505

- Magic Johnson hits an 88-foot shot at the buzzer to end the first half.

April 25

Boxscore

Denver Nuggets 127, Los Angeles Lakers 139
Scoring by quarter: 23–40, 32–33, 33–32, 39–34
Pts: Fat Lever 26; Rebs: Fat Lever 10; Asts: Fat Lever 9	Pts: Kareem Abdul-Jabbar 28; Rebs: A.C. Green 13; Asts: Magic Johnson 15
LA Lakers lead series, 2–0

The Forum, Inglewood, California
Attendance: 17,297
Referees: Hugh Evans, Bill Saar, Ronnie Nunn

April 29

Boxscore

Los Angeles Lakers 140, Denver Nuggets 103
Scoring by quarter: 25–26, 44–30, 36–22, 35–25
Pts: Byron Scott 25; Rebs: A.C. Green 10; Asts: Magic Johnson 14	Pts: Alex English 25; Rebs: Wayne Cooper 12; Asts: Alex English 6
LA Lakers win series, 3–0

McNichols Sports Arena, Denver, Colorado
Attendance: 15,137
Referees: Joe Crawford, Hue Hollins, Mike Lauerman

Regular-season series
Los Angeles won 5–0 in the regular-season series

November 7, 1986

Recap

Denver Nuggets 116, Los Angeles Lakers 138

The Forum, Inglewood, California

January 7, 1987

Recap

Denver Nuggets 109, Los Angeles Lakers 147

The Forum, Inglewood, California

February 18, 1987

Recap

Los Angeles Lakers 128, Denver Nuggets 122

McNichols Sports Arena, Denver, Colorado

March 10, 1987

Recap

Denver Nuggets 107, Los Angeles Lakers 143

The Forum, Inglewood, California

April 5, 1987

Recap

Los Angeles Lakers 126, Denver Nuggets 118

McNichols Sports Arena, Denver, Colorado

This was the third playoff meeting between these two teams, with the Lakers winning the first two meetings.

Previous playoff series
Los Angeles leads 2–0 in all-time playoff series

1979

Denver Nuggets 1, Los Angeles Lakers 2

1979 Western Conference First Round

1985

Denver Nuggets 1, Los Angeles Lakers 4

1985 Western Conference Finals

==== (2) Dallas Mavericks vs. (7) Seattle SuperSonics ====
April 23

Boxscore

Seattle SuperSonics 129, Dallas Mavericks 151
Scoring by quarter: 28–39, 31–38, 29–43, 41–31
Pts: Tom Chambers 35; Rebs: Xavier McDaniel 13; Asts: Xavier McDaniel 7	Pts: Mark Aguirre 28; Rebs: Roy Tarpley 11; Asts: Brad Davis 9
Dallas leads series, 1–0

Reunion Arena, Dallas, Texas
Attendance: 17,007
Referees: John Vanak, Jess Kersey, Bruce Alexander

April 25

Boxscore

Seattle SuperSonics 112, Dallas Mavericks 110
Scoring by quarter: 35–34, 29–32, 26–26, 22–18
Pts: Dale Ellis 32; Rebs: Xavier McDaniel 9 Asts: Nate McMillan 8	Pts: Mark Aguirre 28; Rebs: Roy Tarpley 8 Asts: Derek Harper 8
Series tied, 1–1

Reunion Arena, Dallas, Texas
Attendance: 17,007
Referees: Jack Madden, Paul Mihalak, Bernie Fryer

April 28

Boxscore

Dallas Mavericks 107, Seattle SuperSonics 117
Scoring by quarter: 15–26, 22–29, 36–34, 34–28
Pts: Derek Harper 30; Rebs: Sam Perkins 11; Asts: Derek Harper 8	Pts: Dale Ellis 43; Rebs: Dale Ellis 14; Asts: Nate McMillan 9
Seattle leads series, 2–1

Hec Edmundson Pavilion, Seattle, Washington
Attendance: 8,150
Referees: Joe Crawford, Bill Saar, Bennett Salvatore

April 30

Boxscore

Dallas Mavericks 98, Seattle SuperSonics 124
Scoring by quarter: 21–33, 27–28, 29–27, 21–36
Pts: Rolando Blackman 25; Rebs: Roy Tarpley 17; Asts: Derek Harper 5	Pts: Tom Chambers 31; Rebs: Chambers, Ellis 9 each Asts: Nate McMillan 9
Seattle wins series, 3–1

Hec Edmundson Pavilion, Seattle, Washington
Attendance: 8,150
Referees: Earl Strom, Tommy Nunez Sr., Bill Oakes

- Seattle becomes first 7th seeded team to eliminate 2nd seeded team since Playoffs moved to 16-team format in 1984.

Regular-season series
Dallas won 5–0 in the regular-season series

November 6, 1986

Recap

Dallas Mavericks 147, Seattle SuperSonics 124

Seattle Center Coliseum, Seattle

December 13, 1986

Recap

Dallas Mavericks 126, Seattle SuperSonics 109

Seattle Center Coliseum, Seattle

January 2, 1987

Recap

Seattle SuperSonics 107, Dallas Mavericks 117

Reunion Arena, Dallas

February 4, 1987

Recap

Seattle SuperSonics 94, Dallas Mavericks 124

Reunion Arena, Dallas

March 11, 1987

Recap

Seattle SuperSonics 117, Dallas Mavericks 130

Reunion Arena, Dallas

This was the second playoff meeting between these two teams, with the Mavericks winning the first meeting.

Previous playoff series
Dallas leads 1–0 in all-time playoff series

1984

Dallas Mavericks 3, Seattle SuperSonics 2

1984 Western Conference First Round

==== (3) Portland Trail Blazers vs. (6) Houston Rockets ====
April 24

Boxscore

Houston Rockets 125, Portland Trail Blazers 115
Scoring by quarter: 35–32, 30–28, 27–22, 33–33
Pts: Hakeem Olajuwon 30; Rebs: Hakeem Olajuwon 10; Asts: Allen Leavell 10	Pts: Kiki VanDeWeghe 30; Rebs: Clyde Drexler 13; Asts: Terry Porter 11
Houston leads series, 1–0

Memorial Coliseum, Portland, Oregon
Attendance: 12,666

April 26

Boxscore

Houston Rockets 98, Portland Trail Blazers 111
Scoring by quarter: 38–29, 12–27, 26–28, 22–27
Pts: Leavell, Sampson 28 each Rebs: Rodney McCray 12; Asts: Allen Leavell 8	Pts: Clyde Drexler 32; Rebs: Porter, Johnson 8 each Asts: Terry Porter 15
Series tied, 1–1

Memorial Coliseum, Portland, Oregon
Attendance: 12,666
Referees: Joe Crawford, Bill Saar, Bennett Salvatore

April 28

Boxscore

Portland Trail Blazers 108, Houston Rockets 117
Scoring by quarter: 22–38, 23–32, 34–24, 29–23
Pts: Clyde Drexler 26; Rebs: Johnson, Jones 10 each Asts: Terry Porter 8	Pts: Hakeem Olajuwon 35; Rebs: Hakeem Olajuwon 11; Asts: Allen Leavell 13
Houston leads series, 2–1

The Summit, Houston, Texas
Attendance: 16,279
Referees: Ed T. Rush, Mike Mathis, James Capers Sr.

April 30

Boxscore

Portland Trail Blazers 101, Houston Rockets 113
Scoring by quarter: 21–20, 30–41, 17–28, 33–24
Pts: Kiki VanDeWeghe 27; Rebs: Steve Johnson 12; Asts: Terry Porter 6	Pts: Hakeem Olajuwon 27; Rebs: McCray, Sampson 10 each Asts: Allen Leavell 8
Houston wins series, 3–1

The Summit, Houston, Texas
Attendance: 16,279
Referees: Darell Garretson, Ed Middleton, Bernie Fryer

Regular-season series
Portland won 3–2 in the regular-season series

November 18, 1986

Recap

Portland Trail Blazers 115, Houston Rockets 111 (OT)

The Summit, Houston

December 19, 1986

Recap

Houston Rockets 112, Portland Trail Blazers 115

Memorial Coliseum, Portland, Oregon

March 8, 1987

Recap

Houston Rockets 93, Portland Trail Blazers 119

Memorial Coliseum, Portland, Oregon

March 26, 1987

Recap

Portland Trail Blazers 104, Houston Rockets 119

The Summit, Houston

April 6, 1987

Recap

Houston Rockets 114, Portland Trail Blazers 108

Memorial Coliseum, Portland, Oregon

This was the first playoff meeting between the Rockets and the Trail Blazers.

==== (4) Utah Jazz vs. (5) Golden State Warriors ====
April 23

Boxscore

Golden State Warriors 85, Utah Jazz 99
Scoring by quarter: 18–21, 23–32, 27–23, 17–23
Pts: Joe Barry Carroll 18; Rebs: Joe Barry Carroll 9 Asts: Sleepy Floyd 8	Pts: Malone, Bailey 20 each Rebs: Mark Eaton 15; Asts: Rickey Green 15
Utah leads series, 1–0

Salt Palace, Salt Lake City, Utah
Attendance: 11,376
Referees: Hugh Evans, Ed Middleton, Ronnie Nunn

April 25

Boxscore

Golden State Warriors 100, Utah Jazz 103
Scoring by quarter: 18–28, 28–35, 30–15, 24–25
Pts: Joe Barry Carroll 22; Rebs: Larry Smith 12; Asts: Sleepy Floyd 9	Pts: Darrell Griffith 25; Rebs: Karl Malone 13; Asts: Hansen, Stockton 5 each
Utah leads series, 2–0

Salt Palace, Salt Lake City, Utah
Attendance: 12,095

April 29

Boxscore

Utah Jazz 95, Golden State Warriors 110
Scoring by quarter: 24–23, 20–32, 23–22, 28–33
Pts: Kelly Tripucka 16; Rebs: Karl Malone 9 Asts: John Stockton 8	Pts: Terry Teagle 30; Rebs: Larry Smith 17; Asts: Sleepy Floyd 8
Utah leads series, 2–1

Oakland–Alameda County Coliseum Arena, Oakland, California
Attendance: 15,025
Referees: Earl Strom, Bill Oakes, Bennett Salvatore

May 1

Boxscore

Utah Jazz 94, Golden State Warriors 98
Scoring by quarter: 22–25, 26–18, 26–25, 20–30
Pts: Hansen, Malone 20 each Rebs: Mark Eaton 15; Asts: John Stockton 11	Pts: Purvis Short 32; Rebs: Larry Smith 8 Asts: Sleepy Floyd 11
Series tied, 2–2

Oakland–Alameda County Coliseum Arena, Oakland, California
Attendance: 15,025
Referees: Ed T. Rush, Hue Hollins, Tommy Nunez Sr.

May 3

Boxscore

Golden State Warriors 118, Utah Jazz 113
Scoring by quarter: 35–29, 32–22, 23–26, 28–36
Pts: Joe Barry Carroll 24; Rebs: Larry Smith 14; Asts: Sleepy Floyd 14	Pts: Karl Malone 23; Rebs: Mark Eaton 10; Asts: John Stockton 13
Golden State wins series, 3–2

Salt Palace, Salt Lake City, Utah
Attendance: 11,071
Referees: Jack Madden, Jess Kersey

Regular-season series
Utah won 3–2 in the regular-season series

November 25, 1986

Recap

Utah Jazz 106, Golden State Warriors 111

Oakland–Alameda County Coliseum Arena, Oakland, California

January 23, 1987

Recap

Golden State Warriors 100, Utah Jazz 123

Salt Palace, Salt Lake City

March 17, 1987

Recap

Golden State Warriors 103, Utah Jazz 118

Salt Palace, Salt Lake City

March 28, 1987

Recap

Utah Jazz 110, Golden State Warriors 116

Oakland–Alameda County Coliseum Arena, Oakland, California

April 12, 1987

Recap

Utah Jazz 109, Golden State Warriors 107

Oakland–Alameda County Coliseum Arena, Oakland, California

This was the first playoff meeting between the Warriors and the Jazz.

== Conference Semifinals ==
=== Eastern Conference Semifinals ===
==== (1) Boston Celtics vs. (4) Milwaukee Bucks ====
May 5

Boxscore

Milwaukee Bucks 98, Boston Celtics 111
Scoring by quarter: 26–34, 29–31, 18–20, 25–26
Pts: Terry Cummings 28; Rebs: Terry Cummings 12; Asts: Paul Pressey 8	Pts: Larry Bird 40; Rebs: Robert Parish 12; Asts: Bird, Johnson 7 each
Boston leads series, 1–0

Boston Garden, Boston, Massachusetts
Attendance: 14,890
Referees: Joe Crawford, Mike Mathis, Dick Bavetta

May 6

Boxscore

Milwaukee Bucks 124, Boston Celtics 126
Scoring by quarter: 27–25, 37–39, 31–36, 29–26
Pts: Terry Cummings 28; Rebs: Jack Sikma 14; Asts: Paul Pressey 6	Pts: Bird, Ainge 30 each Rebs: Larry Bird 10; Asts: Dennis Johnson 10
Boston leads series, 2–0

Boston Garden, Boston, Massachusetts
Attendance: 14,890
Referees: Ed Middleton, Hugh Evans, Jack Nies

May 8

Boxscore

Boston Celtics 121, Milwaukee Bucks 126 (OT)
Scoring by quarter: 34–33, 24–29, 26–23, 30–29, Overtime: 7–12
Pts: Dennis Johnson 32; Rebs: Robert Parish 16; Asts: Dennis Johnson 14	Pts: John Lucas 30; Rebs: Terry Cummings 12; Asts: Paul Pressey 7
Boston leads series, 2–1

MECCA Arena, Milwaukee, Wisconsin
Attendance: 11,052
Referees: Jack Madden, Bill Saar

May 10

Boxscore

Boston Celtics 138, Milwaukee Bucks 137 (2OT)
Scoring by quarter: 32–31, 32–34, 29–30, 24–22, Overtime: 10–10, 11–10
Pts: Larry Bird 42; Rebs: Kevin McHale 11; Asts: Dennis Johnson 12	Pts: Terry Cummings 31; Rebs: Terry Cummings 11; Asts: Paul Pressey 11
Boston leads series, 3–1

MECCA Arena, Milwaukee, Wisconsin
Attendance: 11,052
Referees: Hue Hollins, Jess Kersey

May 13

Boxscore

Milwaukee Bucks 129, Boston Celtics 124
Scoring by quarter: 38–32, 27–34, 32–36, 32–22
Pts: Sidney Moncrief 33; Rebs: Sikma, Cummings 9 each Asts: Paul Pressey 10	Pts: Robert Parish 30; Rebs: Robert Parish 16; Asts: Larry Bird 12
Boston leads series, 3–2

Boston Garden, Boston, Massachusetts
Attendance: 14,890
Referees: Paul Mihalak, Jake O'Donnell

May 15

Boxscore

Boston Celtics 111, Milwaukee Bucks 121
Scoring by quarter: 36–27, 31–32, 24–31, 20–31
Pts: Dennis Johnson 25; Rebs: Kevin McHale 16; Asts: Dennis Johnson 14	Pts: Sidney Moncrief 34; Rebs: Terry Cummings 11; Asts: Paul Pressey 11
Series tied, 3–3

MECCA Arena, Milwaukee, Wisconsin
Attendance: 11,052
Referees: Earl Strom, Darell Garretson, Joe Crawford

May 17

Boxscore

Milwaukee Bucks 113, Boston Celtics 119
Scoring by quarter: 36–29, 23–27, 30–32, 24–31
Pts: Paul Pressey 28; Rebs: Jack Sikma 10; Asts: Paul Pressey 8	Pts: Larry Bird 31; Rebs: Robert Parish 19; Asts: Dennis Johnson 10
Boston wins series, 4–3

Boston Garden, Boston, Massachusetts
Attendance: 14,890
Referees: Ed T. Rush, Hugh Evans

Regular-season series
Tied 3–3 in the regular-season series

November 1, 1986

Recap

Boston Celtics 105, Milwaukee Bucks 111

MECCA Arena, Milwaukee

November 12, 1986

Recap

Milwaukee Bucks 116, Boston Celtics 124

Boston Garden, Boston

December 20, 1986

Recap

Boston Celtics 100, Milwaukee Bucks 120

MECCA Arena, Milwaukee

January 7, 1987

Recap

Milwaukee Bucks 92, Boston Celtics 119

Boston Garden, Boston

March 17, 1987

Recap

Boston Celtics 115, Milwaukee Bucks 123

MECCA Arena, Milwaukee

March 18, 1987

Recap

Milwaukee Bucks 102, Boston Celtics 120

Boston Garden, Boston

This was the fifth playoff meeting between these two teams, with the Celtics winning three of the first four meetings.

Previous playoff series
Boston leads 3–1 in all-time playoff series

1974

Boston Celtics 4, Milwaukee Bucks 3

1974 NBA Finals

1983

Boston Celtics 0, Milwaukee Bucks 4

1983 Eastern Conference Semifinals

1984

Boston Celtics 4, Milwaukee Bucks 1

1984 Eastern Conference Finals

1986

Boston Celtics 4, Milwaukee Bucks 0

1986 Eastern Conference Finals

==== (2) Atlanta Hawks vs. (3) Detroit Pistons ====
May 3

Boxscore

Detroit Pistons 112, Atlanta Hawks 111
Scoring by quarter: 27–26, 29–31, 29–28, 27–26
Pts: Isiah Thomas 30; Rebs: Dennis Rodman 10; Asts: Isiah Thomas 10	Pts: Kevin Willis 22; Rebs: Kevin Willis 10; Asts: Doc Rivers 14
Detroit leads series, 1–0

Omni Coliseum, Atlanta, Georgia
Attendance: 14,361

May 5

Boxscore

Detroit Pistons 102, Atlanta Hawks 115
Scoring by quarter: 22–25, 26–31, 23–27, 31–32
Pts: Laimbeer, Thomas 20 each Rebs: Bill Laimbeer 12; Asts: Isiah Thomas 6	Pts: Randy Wittman 34; Rebs: Kevin Willis 10; Asts: Doc Rivers 14
Series tied, 1–1

Omni Coliseum, Atlanta, Georgia
Attendance: 16,522
Referees: Darell Garretson, Bennett Salvatore, Jack Nies

May 8

Boxscore

Atlanta Hawks 99, Detroit Pistons 108
Scoring by quarter: 23–25, 18–16, 34–44, 24–23
Pts: Kevin Willis 26; Rebs: Kevin Willis 12; Asts: Doc Rivers 8	Pts: Isiah Thomas 35; Rebs: Dennis Rodman 9 Asts: Isiah Thomas 8
Detroit leads series, 2–1

Pontiac Silverdome, Pontiac, Michigan
Attendance: 24,544
Referees: Hue Hollins, Hugh Evans, Ed Middleton

May 10

Boxscore

Atlanta Hawks 88, Detroit Pistons 89
Scoring by quarter: 19–17, 21–23, 23–29, 25–20
Pts: Wilkins, Battle 19 each Rebs: Dominique Wilkins 12; Asts: Doc Rivers 7	Pts: Isiah Thomas 31; Rebs: Rick Mahorn 17; Asts: Joe Dumars 5
Detroit leads series, 3–1

Pontiac Silverdome, Pontiac, Michigan
Attendance: 17,269
Referees: Earl Strom, Ed Middleton

- Isiah Thomas makes the game-winning layup with 1 second left.

May 13

Boxscore

Detroit Pistons 104, Atlanta Hawks 96
Scoring by quarter: 24–22, 18–29, 23–26, 39–19
Pts: Joe Dumars 21; Rebs: Rick Mahorn 16; Asts: Isiah Thomas 12	Pts: Dominique Wilkins 26; Rebs: Dominique Wilkins 12; Asts: Doc Rivers 15
Detroit wins series, 4–1

Omni Coliseum, Atlanta, Georgia
Attendance: 16,522
Referees: Jack Madden, Mike Mathis, Bill Oakes

Regular-season series
Tied 3–3 in the regular-season series

November 14, 1986

Recap

Atlanta Hawks 105, Detroit Pistons 100

Pontiac Silverdome, Pontiac, Michigan

December 16, 1986

Recap

Detroit Pistons 111, Atlanta Hawks 100

The Omni, Atlanta

January 19, 1987

Recap

Atlanta Hawks 98, Detroit Pistons 108

Pontiac Silverdome, Pontiac, Michigan

February 17, 1987

Recap

Detroit Pistons 103, Atlanta Hawks 107

The Omni, Atlanta

February 21, 1987

Recap

Atlanta Hawks 97, Detroit Pistons 102

Pontiac Silverdome, Pontiac, Michigan

April 10, 1987

Recap

Detroit Pistons 99, Atlanta Hawks 101

The Omni, Atlanta

This was the fifth playoff meeting between these two teams, with the Hawks winning three of the first four meetings. It is the first win for the Pistons since the franchise moved to Detroit.

Previous playoff series
Atlanta leads 3–1 in all-time playoff series

1956

Fort Wayne Pistons 3, St. Louis Hawks 2

1956 Western Division Finals

1958

Detroit Pistons 1, St. Louis Hawks 4

1958 Western Division Finals

1963

Detroit Pistons 1, St. Louis Hawks 3

1963 Western Division Semifinals

1986

Atlanta Hawks 3, Detroit Pistons 1

1986 Eastern Conference First Round

=== Western Conference semifinals ===
==== (1) Los Angeles Lakers vs. (5) Golden State Warriors ====
May 5

Boxscore

Golden State Warriors 116, Los Angeles Lakers 125
Scoring by quarter: 29–30, 33–25, 23–49, 31–21
Pts: Joe Barry Carroll 22; Rebs: Larry Smith 11; Asts: Sleepy Floyd 7	Pts: James Worthy 28; Rebs: Magic Johnson 12; Asts: Magic Johnson 14
LA Lakers lead series, 1–0

The Forum, Inglewood, California
Attendance: 17,505

May 7

Boxscore

Golden State Warriors 101, Los Angeles Lakers 116
Scoring by quarter: 25–32, 26–26, 27–27, 23–31
Pts: Joe Barry Carroll 22; Rebs: Larry Smith 13; Asts: Sleepy Floyd 12	Pts: Kareem Abdul-Jabbar 25; Rebs: three players 8 each Asts: Michael Cooper 12
LA Lakers lead series, 2–0

The Forum, Inglewood, California
Attendance: 17,505
Referees: Darell Garretson, Bill Oakes, John Vanak

May 9

Boxscore

Los Angeles Lakers 133, Golden State Warriors 108
Scoring by quarter: 38–24, 35–32, 30–30, 30–22
Pts: James Worthy 28; Rebs: Mychal Thompson 12; Asts: Magic Johnson 14	Pts: Joe Barry Carroll 23; Rebs: Larry Smith 15; Asts: Sleepy Floyd 12
LA Lakers lead series, 3–0

Oakland–Alameda County Coliseum Arena, Oakland, California
Attendance: 15,025
Referees: Joe Crawford, Mike Mathis, Paul Mihalak

May 10

Boxscore

Los Angeles Lakers 121, Golden State Warriors 129
Scoring by quarter: 34–27, 31–30, 37–31, 19–41
Pts: Byron Scott 28; Rebs: A.C. Green 12; Asts: Michael Cooper 10	Pts: Sleepy Floyd 51; Rebs: Larry Smith 16; Asts: Sleepy Floyd 10
LA Lakers lead series, 3–1

Oakland–Alameda County Coliseum Arena, Oakland, California
Attendance: 15,025
Referees: Ed T. Rush, Paul Mihalak, John Vanak

- Sleepy Floyd's record 39-point 2nd half and 29-point 4th quarter.

May 12

Boxscore

Golden State Warriors 106, Los Angeles Lakers 118
Scoring by quarter: 29–32, 23–33, 25–34, 29–19
Pts: Purvis Short 20; Rebs: Larry Smith 23; Asts: Sleepy Floyd 11	Pts: James Worthy 23; Rebs: Kareem Abdul-Jabbar 9 Asts: Magic Johnson 13
LA Lakers win series, 4–1

The Forum, Inglewood, California
Attendance: 17,505
Referees: Earl Strom, Hue Hollins, Tommy Nunez Sr.

Regular-season series
Los Angeles won 4–2 in the regular-season series

December 4, 1986

Recap

Los Angeles Lakers 106, Golden State Warriors 116

Oakland–Alameda County Coliseum Arena, Oakland, California

December 7, 1986

Recap

Golden State Warriors 100, Los Angeles Lakers 132

The Forum, Inglewood, California

January 10, 1987

Recap

Los Angeles Lakers 109, Golden State Warriors 124

Oakland–Alameda County Coliseum Arena, Oakland, California

January 15, 1987

Recap

Golden State Warriors 109, Los Angeles Lakers 129

The Forum, Inglewood, California

February 27, 1987

Recap

Golden State Warriors 109, Los Angeles Lakers 121

The Forum, Inglewood, California

March 3, 1987

Recap

Los Angeles Lakers 114, Golden State Warriors 109

Oakland–Alameda County Coliseum Arena, Oakland, California

This was the sixth playoff meeting between these two teams, with the Lakers winning four of the first five meetings.

Previous playoff series
Los Angeles leads 4–1 in all-time playoff series

1967

Los Angeles Lakers 0, San Francisco Warriors 3

1967 Western Division Semifinals

1968

Los Angeles Lakers 4, San Francisco Warriors 0

1968 Western Division Finals

1969

Los Angeles Lakers 4, San Francisco Warriors 2

1969 Western Division Semifinals

1973

Golden State Warriors 1, Los Angeles Lakers 4

1973 Western Conference Finals

1977

Golden State Warriors 3, Los Angeles Lakers 4

1977 Western Conference Semifinals

==== (6) Houston Rockets vs. (7) Seattle SuperSonics ====
May 2

Boxscore

Seattle SuperSonics 111, Houston Rockets 106 (OT)
Scoring by quarter: 25–26, 24–22, 28–25, 20–24, Overtime: 14–9
Pts: Dale Ellis 34; Rebs: Tom Chambers 9 Asts: Nate McMillan 8	Pts: Hakeem Olajuwon 28; Rebs: Hakeem Olajuwon 16; Asts: Rodney McCray 8
Seattle leads series, 1–0

The Summit, Houston, Texas
Attendance: 16,279
Referees: Hugh Evans, Dick Bavetta, Bill Saar

May 5

Boxscore

Seattle SuperSonics 99, Houston Rockets 97
Scoring by quarter: 28–21, 24–27, 18–31, 29–18
Pts: Dale Ellis 30; Rebs: Dale Ellis 9 Asts: Eddie Johnson 8	Pts: Hakeem Olajuwon 27; Rebs: Olajuwon, Sampson 13 each Asts: Leavell, McCray 8 each
Seattle leads series, 2–0

The Summit, Houston, Texas
Attendance: 16,279
Referees: Earl Strom, Paul Mihalak, Tommy Nunez Sr.

May 7

Boxscore

Houston Rockets 102, Seattle SuperSonics 84
Scoring by quarter: 29–20, 27–13, 19–24, 27–27
Pts: Hakeem Olajuwon 33; Rebs: Hakeem Olajuwon 11; Asts: Robert Reid 9	Pts: Tom Chambers 24; Rebs: Dale Ellis 10; Asts: McMillan, Young 4 each
Seattle leads series, 2–1

Seattle Center Coliseum, Seattle, Washington
Attendance: 14,587

May 9

Boxscore

Houston Rockets 102, Seattle SuperSonics 117
Scoring by quarter: 31–31, 24–31, 24–24, 23–31
Pts: McCray, Olajuwon 20 each Rebs: Rodney McCray 12; Asts: Allen Leavell 5	Pts: Tom Chambers 38; Rebs: Alton Lister 17; Asts: Nate McMillan 10
Seattle leads series, 3–1

Seattle Center Coliseum, Seattle, Washington
Attendance: 14,559
Referees: John Vanak, Darell Garretson, Bill Oakes

May 12

Boxscore

Seattle SuperSonics 107, Houston Rockets 112
Scoring by quarter: 22–35, 34–31, 30–23, 21–23
Pts: Dale Ellis 27; Rebs: Tom Chambers 9 Asts: Eddie Johnson 6	Pts: Hakeem Olajuwon 26; Rebs: Rodney McCray 10; Asts: Rodney McCray 11
Seattle leads series, 3–2

The Summit, Houston, Texas
Attendance: 16,279
Referees: Jess Kersey, Joe Crawford, Dick Bavetta

May 14

Boxscore

Houston Rockets 125, Seattle SuperSonics 128 (2OT)
Scoring by quarter: 28–36, 30–18, 26–24, 23–29, Overtime: 8–8, 10–13
Pts: Hakeem Olajuwon 49; Rebs: Hakeem Olajuwon 25; Asts: Robert Reid 12	Pts: Tom Chambers 37; Rebs: Xavier McDaniel 12; Asts: Nate McMillan 16
Seattle wins series, 4–2

Seattle Center Coliseum, Seattle, Washington
Attendance: 14,751
Referees: Ed T. Rush, Hugh Evans, Hue Hollins

Regular-season series
Seattle won 4–1 in the regular-season series

December 6, 1986

Recap

Seattle SuperSonics 136, Houston Rockets 80

The Summit, Houston

December 18, 1986

Recap

Houston Rockets 100, Seattle SuperSonics 114

Seattle Center Coliseum, Seattle

January 3, 1987

Recap

Seattle SuperSonics 114, Houston Rockets 138

The Summit, Houston

March 7, 1987

Recap

Houston Rockets 115, Seattle SuperSonics 118

Seattle Center Coliseum, Seattle

March 10, 1987

Recap

Seattle SuperSonics 136, Houston Rockets 127 (2OT)

The Summit, Houston

This was the second playoff meeting between these two teams, with the SuperSonics winning the first meeting.

Previous playoff series
Seattle leads 1–0 in all-time playoff series

1982

Houston Rockets 1, Seattle SuperSonics 2

1982 Western Conference First Round

== Conference finals ==
=== Eastern Conference finals ===
==== (1) Boston Celtics vs. (3) Detroit Pistons ====
May 19

Boxscore

Detroit Pistons 91, Boston Celtics 104
Scoring by quarter: 22–26, 18–18, 28–31, 23–29
Pts: Isiah Thomas 18; Rebs: Rick Mahorn 11; Asts: Isiah Thomas 10	Pts: Robert Parish 31; Rebs: Larry Bird 16; Asts: Larry Bird 11
Boston leads series, 1–0

Boston Garden, Boston, Massachusetts
Attendance: 14,890
Referees: Joe Crawford, Paul Mihalak

May 21

Boxscore

Detroit Pistons 101, Boston Celtics 110
Scoring by quarter: 23–32, 36–22, 22–28, 20–28
Pts: Isiah Thomas 36; Rebs: Bill Laimbeer 16; Asts: Isiah Thomas 10	Pts: Larry Bird 31; Rebs: Bird, Parish 9 each Asts: Larry Bird 12
Boston leads series, 2–0

Boston Garden, Boston, Massachusetts
Attendance: 14,890
Referees: Earl Strom, Bill Saar, Hue Hollins

May 23

Boxscore

Boston Celtics 104, Detroit Pistons 122
Scoring by quarter: 28–37, 25–36, 28–20, 23–29
Pts: Sam Vincent 18; Rebs: Larry Bird 11; Asts: Dennis Johnson 8	Pts: Adrian Dantley 25; Rebs: Rick Mahorn 12; Asts: Vinnie Johnson 8
Boston leads series, 2–1

Pontiac Silverdome, Pontiac, Michigan
Attendance: 23,525
Referees: Darell Garretson, Hue Hollins

May 24

Boxscore

Boston Celtics 119, Detroit Pistons 145
Scoring by quarter: 25–31, 33–31, 30–42, 31–41
Pts: Sam Vincent 18; Rebs: Kevin McHale 9 Asts: Sam Vincent 7	Pts: Adrian Dantley 32; Rebs: Bill Laimbeer 13; Asts: Thomas, Dumars 8 each
Series tied, 2–2

Pontiac Silverdome, Pontiac, Michigan
Attendance: 27,387

May 26

Boxscore

Detroit Pistons 107, Boston Celtics 108
Scoring by quarter: 29–38, 27–20, 29–28, 22–22
Pts: Adrian Dantley 25; Rebs: Bill Laimbeer 14; Asts: Isiah Thomas 11	Pts: Larry Bird 36; Rebs: Larry Bird 12; Asts: Larry Bird 9
Boston leads series, 3–2

Boston Garden, Boston, Massachusetts
Attendance: 14,890
Referees: Jack Madden, Jess Kersey

- Larry Bird steals Isiah Thomas' inbound pass and gives the ball to Dennis Johnson, who hits the game-winning lay-up with 1 second left.

May 28

Boxscore

Boston Celtics 105, Detroit Pistons 113
Scoring by quarter: 33–31, 22–27, 28–26, 22–29
Pts: Larry Bird 35; Rebs: Kevin McHale 12; Asts: Dennis Johnson 11	Pts: Dantley, V. Johnson 24 each Rebs: Rick Mahorn 18; Asts: Isiah Thomas 9
Series tied, 3–3

Pontiac Silverdome, Pontiac, Michigan
Attendance: 28,383
Referees: Ed T. Rush, Joe Crawford, Bill Saar

May 30

Boxscore

Detroit Pistons 114, Boston Celtics 117
Scoring by quarter: 31–24, 25–31, 24–26, 34–36
Pts: Joe Dumars 35; Rebs: Bill Laimbeer 13; Asts: Isiah Thomas 9	Pts: Larry Bird 37; Rebs: Robert Parish 11; Asts: Dennis Johnson 11
Boston wins series, 4–3

Boston Garden, Boston, Massachusetts
Attendance: 14,890
Referees: Darell Garretson, Earl Strom

Regular-season series
Boston won 3–2 in the regular-season series

November 15, 1986

Recap

Boston Celtics 118, Detroit Pistons 111

Pontiac Silverdome, Pontiac, Michigan

January 10, 1987

Recap

Boston Celtics 101, Detroit Pistons 118

Pontiac Silverdome, Pontiac, Michigan

March 1, 1987

Recap

Detroit Pistons 102, Boston Celtics 112

Boston Garden, Boston

March 8, 1987

Recap

Boston Celtics 119, Detroit Pistons 122 (OT)

Pontiac Silverdome, Pontiac, Michigan

April 3, 1987

Recap

Detroit Pistons 115, Boston Celtics 119 (OT)

Boston Garden, Boston

This was the third playoff meeting between these two teams, with the Celtics winning the first two meetings.

Previous playoff series
Boston leads 2–0 in all-time playoff series

1968

Boston Celtics 4, Detroit Pistons 2

1968 Eastern Division Semifinals

1985

Boston Celtics 4, Detroit Pistons 2

1985 Eastern Conference Semifinals

=== Western Conference finals ===
==== (1) Los Angeles Lakers vs. (7) Seattle SuperSonics ====
May 16

Boxscore

Seattle SuperSonics 87, Los Angeles Lakers 92
Scoring by quarter: 25–27, 17–24, 30–26, 15–15
Pts: Tom Chambers 28; Rebs: McDaniel, Lister 10 each Asts: Nate McMillan 8	Pts: James Worthy 27; Rebs: Magic Johnson 7 Asts: Magic Johnson 11
LA Lakers lead series, 1–0

The Forum, Inglewood, California
Attendance: 17,505
Referees: Jack Madden, Mike Mathis, Ed Middleton

May 19

Boxscore

Seattle SuperSonics 104, Los Angeles Lakers 112
Scoring by quarter: 29–32, 26–24, 22–27, 27–29
Pts: Dale Ellis 22; Rebs: Xavier McDaniel 8 Asts: Nate McMillan 7	Pts: James Worthy 30; Rebs: A.C. Green 14; Asts: Magic Johnson 10
LA Lakers lead series, 2–0

The Forum, Inglewood, California
Attendance: 17,505

May 23

Boxscore

Los Angeles Lakers 122, Seattle SuperSonics 121
Scoring by quarter: 36–32, 28–26, 33–28, 25–35
Pts: James Worthy 39; Rebs: Kareem Abdul-Jabbar 10; Asts: Magic Johnson 11	Pts: Xavier McDaniel 42; Rebs: Xavier McDaniel 10; Asts: Nate McMillan 15
LA Lakers lead series, 3–0

Seattle Center Coliseum, Seattle, Washington
Attendance: 14,657
Referees: Jess Kersey, Paul Mihalak, John Vanak

- Michael Cooper's game-saving block on Dale Ellis with 35 seconds left.

May 25

Boxscore

Los Angeles Lakers 133, Seattle SuperSonics 102
Scoring by quarter: 39–28, 29–19, 32–30, 33–25
Pts: James Worthy 26; Rebs: A.C. Green 13; Asts: Magic Johnson 12	Pts: Tom Chambers 20; Rebs: Alton Lister 20; Asts: Kevin Williams 5
LA Lakers win series, 4–0

Seattle Center Coliseum, Seattle, Washington
Attendance: 14,477
Referees: Ed T. Rush, Joe Crawford

Regular-season series
Los Angeles won 4–2 in the regular-season series

November 4, 1986

Recap

Los Angeles Lakers 110, Seattle SuperSonics 96

Seattle Center Coliseum, Seattle

November 12, 1986

Recap

Seattle SuperSonics 97, Los Angeles Lakers 122

The Forum, Inglewood, California

January 28, 1987

Recap

Los Angeles Lakers 101, Seattle SuperSonics 125

Seattle Center Coliseum, Seattle

March 4, 1987

Recap

Seattle SuperSonics 124, Los Angeles Lakers 138

The Forum, Inglewood, California

April 2, 1987

Recap

Los Angeles Lakers 117, Seattle SuperSonics 114

Seattle Center Coliseum, Seattle

April 19, 1987

Recap

Seattle SuperSonics 110, Los Angeles Lakers 104

The Forum, Inglewood, California

This was the fourth playoff meeting between these two teams, with the SuperSonics winning two of the first three meetings.

Previous playoff series
Seattle leads 2–1 in all-time playoff series

1978

Los Angeles Lakers 1, Seattle SuperSonics 2

1978 Western Conference First Round

1979

Los Angeles Lakers 1, Seattle SuperSonics 4

1979 Western Conference Semifinals

1980

Los Angeles Lakers 4, Seattle SuperSonics 1

1980 Western Conference Finals

== NBA Finals: (W1) Los Angeles Lakers vs. (E1) Boston Celtics ==
June 2

Boxscore

Boston Celtics 113, Los Angeles Lakers 126
Scoring by quarter: 26–35, 28–34, 31–32, 28–25
Pts: Larry Bird 32; Rebs: Larry Bird 7 Asts: Dennis Johnson 13	Pts: James Worthy 33; Rebs: Kareem Abdul-Jabbar 10; Asts: Magic Johnson 13
LA Lakers lead series, 1–0

The Forum, Inglewood, California
Attendance: 17,505
Referees: Jake O'Donnell, Hugh Evans

June 4

Boxscore

Boston Celtics 122, Los Angeles Lakers 141
Scoring by quarter: 34–38, 22–37, 36–32, 30–34
Pts: Larry Bird 23; Rebs: Robert Parish 14; Asts: Dennis Johnson 9	Pts: Byron Scott 24; Rebs: M. Johnson, Rambis 5 each Asts: Magic Johnson 20
LA Lakers lead series, 2–0

The Forum, Inglewood, California
Attendance: 17,505
Referees: Ed T. Rush, Jack Madden

- Michael Cooper hits six 3-pointers.

June 7

Boxscore

Los Angeles Lakers 103, Boston Celtics 109
Scoring by quarter: 29–22, 27–38, 22–26, 25–23
Pts: Magic Johnson 32; Rebs: Magic Johnson 11; Asts: Magic Johnson 9	Pts: Larry Bird 30; Rebs: Larry Bird 12; Asts: Ainge, McHale 5 each
LA Lakers lead series, 2–1

Boston Garden, Boston, Massachusetts
Attendance: 14,890
Referees: Darrell Garretson, Joe Crawford

June 9

Boxscore

Los Angeles Lakers 107, Boston Celtics 106
Scoring by quarter: 22–29, 25–26, 31–30, 29–21
Pts: Magic Johnson 29; Rebs: Kareem Abdul-Jabbar 11; Asts: Cooper, M. Johnson 5 each	Pts: Kevin McHale 25; Rebs: Kevin McHale 13; Asts: Dennis Johnson 14
LA Lakers lead series, 3–1

Boston Garden, Boston, Massachusetts
Attendance: 14,890
Referees: Earl Strom, Hugh Evans

- Magic Johnson hits the game-winning "Baby-Hook" with 2 seconds left.

June 11

Boxscore

Los Angeles Lakers 108, Boston Celtics 123
Scoring by quarter: 25–25, 23–38, 29–33, 31–27
Pts: Magic Johnson 29; Rebs: Magic Johnson 8 Asts: Magic Johnson 12	Pts: Dennis Johnson 25; Rebs: Kevin McHale 14; Asts: Dennis Johnson 11
LA Lakers lead series, 3–2

Boston Garden, Boston, Massachusetts
Attendance: 14,890
Referees: Jake O'Donnell, Ed T. Rush

June 14

Boxscore

Boston Celtics 93, Los Angeles Lakers 106
Scoring by quarter: 32–25, 24–26, 12–30, 25–25
Pts: Dennis Johnson 33; Rebs: D. Johnson, McHale 10 each Asts: Danny Ainge 6	Pts: Kareem Abdul-Jabbar 32; Rebs: Mychal Thompson 9 Asts: Magic Johnson 19
LA Lakers win series, 4–2

The Forum, Inglewood, California
Attendance: 17,505
Referees: Darell Garretson, Joe Crawford

- Bill Walton's final NBA game.

Regular-season series
Los Angeles won 2–0 in the regular-season series

December 12, 1986

Recap

Los Angeles Lakers 117, Boston Celtics 110

Boston Garden, Boston

February 15, 1987

Recap

Boston Celtics 103, Los Angeles Lakers 106

The Forum, Inglewood, California

This was the tenth playoff meeting between these two teams, with the Celtics winning eight of the first nine meetings.

Previous playoff series
Boston leads 8–1 in all-time playoff series

1959

Boston Celtics 4, Minneapolis Lakers 0

1959 NBA Finals

1962

Boston Celtics 4, Los Angeles Lakers 3

1962 NBA Finals

1963

Boston Celtics 4, Los Angeles Lakers 2

1963 NBA Finals

1965

Boston Celtics 4, Los Angeles Lakers 1

1965 NBA Finals

1966

Boston Celtics 4, Los Angeles Lakers 3

1966 NBA Finals

1968

Boston Celtics 4, Los Angeles Lakers 2

1968 NBA Finals

1969

Boston Celtics 4, Los Angeles Lakers 3

1969 NBA Finals

1984

Boston Celtics 4, Los Angeles Lakers 3

1984 NBA Finals

1985

Boston Celtics 2, Los Angeles Lakers 4

1985 NBA Finals

== Statistical leaders ==
Category	Game high			Average			
Category	Player	Team	High	Player	Team	Avg.	GP
Points	Sleepy Floyd	Golden State Warriors	51	Michael Jordan	Chicago Bulls	35.7	3
Rebounds	Hakeem Olajuwon	Houston Rockets	25	Charles Oakley	Chicago Bulls	15.3	3
Assists	Magic Johnson	Los Angeles Lakers	20	Magic Johnson	Los Angeles Lakers	12.2	18
Steals	John Stockton	Utah Jazz	6	John Stockton	Utah Jazz	3.0	5
Blocks	Hakeem Olajuwon	Houston Rockets	8	Hakeem Olajuwon	Houston Rockets	4.3	10
