= Reese's College All-Star Game =

College basketball all-star game

- Sport: Basketball
- Founded: 1963
- Founder: NABC
- Most recent champion: Black (2025)
- Broadcasters: CBS, TruTV
- Website: nabc.org

The Reese's College All-Star Game, founded by the NABC, is a men's college basketball game showcasing 20 of the best senior players in NCAA Division I. The two teams are coached by current and/or former college basketball coaches. The game is played annually on the Friday of Final Four weekend during the men's basketball tournament. The all-star game is also played in the same basketball center as the semifinal and final games of the tournament.

Reese's also sponsors the senior all-star games for NCAA Division II and Division III, held at their respective NCAA Championships.

== History ==
It was founded as the NABC College All-Star Game in 1963 and it was played in an East-West format in fornt of 5,000 speactators. Tom Thacker scored 20 and grabbed 15 rebounds, while Nate Thurmond scored 20. Players like Jerry Sloan and Rick Barry played in the 1965 edition while Jeff Mullins, Bennie Lenox, Fred Hetzel and Doug Moon played in 1966.

The 1978 saw the return of legendary coach Al McGuire in a game that Butch Lee was the MVP. The competition was rebranded in 2009 under its sponsor name of Reese's.

== Format ==
Most of the editions have been played in an East-West format. The 2025 All-Star Game introduced the Black versus Orange game.

The event also includes a slam-dunk contest.

== Game results ==
=== Reese's College Division I All-Star Game ===
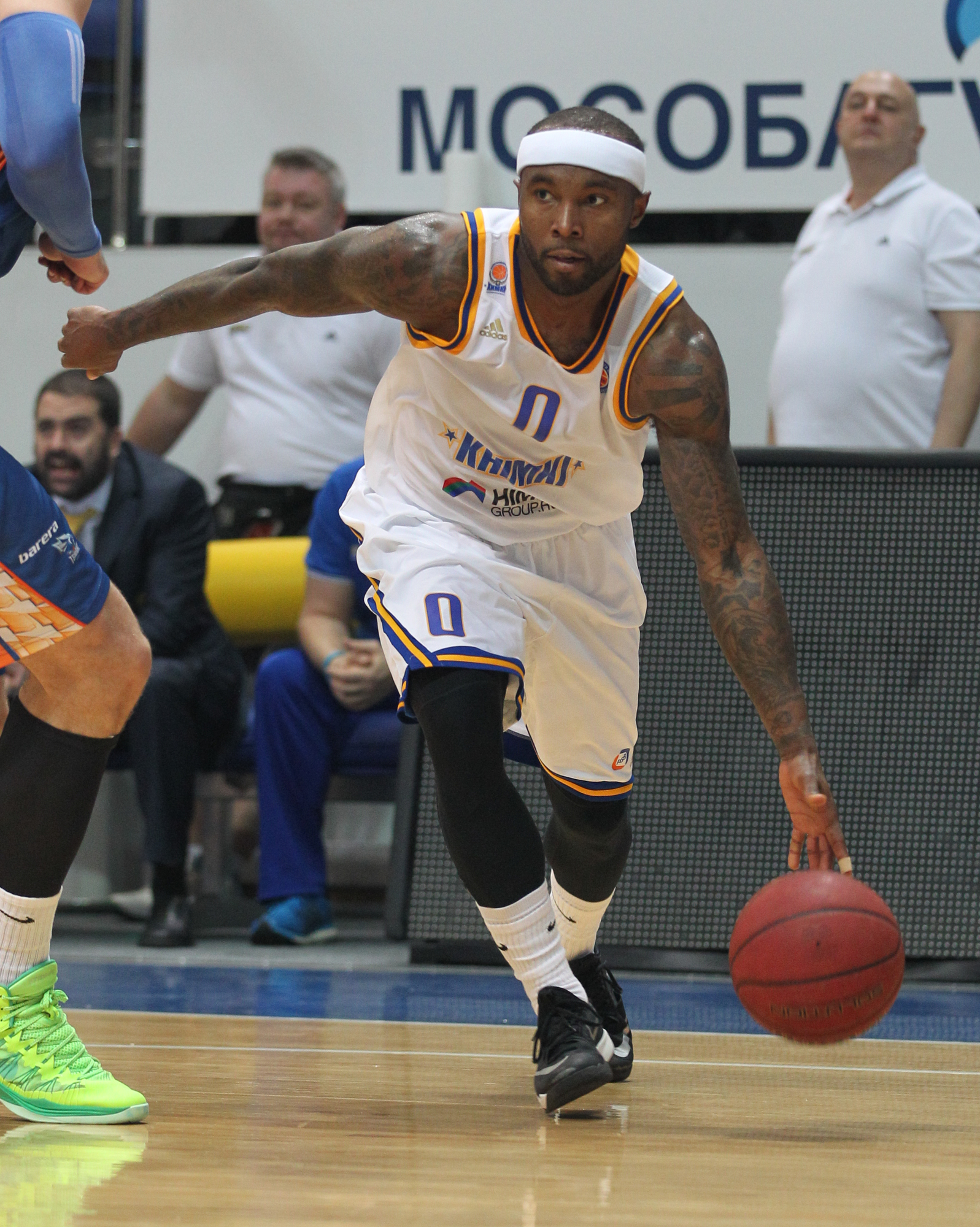
Tyrese Rice was the first MVP by Reese's in 2009.

Year	Result	Host arena	Host city	Game MVPs
2009	Reese's 105, Hershey's 100	Ford Field	Detroit, MI	(Reese's) (United States) Tyrese Rice, Boston College (Hershey's) (United States) Jermaine Taylor, Central Florida
2010	Reese's 106, Hershey's 101	Lucas Oil Stadium	Indianapolis, IN	(Reese's) (United States) Lazar Hayward, Marquette (Hershey's) (United States) Jerome Randle, California
2011	West 113, East 108	Reliant Stadium	Houston, TX	(West) (United States) Kenneth Faried, Morehead State (East) (United States) Gary McGhee Pittsburgh Panthers basketball
2012	East 103, West 99	Mercedes-Benz Superdome	New Orleans, LA	(East) (United States) Jae Crowder, Marquette (West) (United States) Ricardo Ratliffe, Missouri
2013	East 87, West 81	Georgia Dome	Atlanta, GA	(East) (United States) D. J. Cooper, Ohio (West) (United States) Will Clyburn, Iowa State
2014	East 87, West 75	Cowboys Stadium	Arlington, TX	(East) (United States) Jerrelle Benimon, Towson (West) (United States) Drew Crawford, Northwestern
2015	West 109, East 87	Lucas Oil Stadium	Indianapolis, IN	(West) (United States) Corey Hawkins, UC Davis (West) (United States) Le'Bryan Nash, Oklahoma State
2016	West 89, East 85	NRG Stadium	Houston, TX	(West) (United States) Joel Bolomboy, Weber State (East) (United States) David Walker, Northeastern
2017	East 121, West 90	State Farm Stadium	Glendale, AZ	(East) (United States) Tyler Cavanaugh, George Washington (West) (United States) Derek Willis, Kentucky
2018	West 98, East 94	Alamodome	San Antonio, TX	(West) (United States) Yante Maten, Georgia (East) (United States) George King, Colorado
2019	East 110, West 105	U.S. Bank Stadium	Minneapolis, MN	(East) (United States) Ahmad Caver, Old Dominion (West) Chris Clemons, Campbell

== Distinctions ==
=== Basketball Hall of Fame ===
- (United States) Tom Izzo (coach)
- (United States) Nolan Richardson (coach)

=== Collegiate Basketball Hall of Fame ===
- (United States) Johnny Dawkins (coach)
- (United States) Nolan Richardson (coach)
- (United States) Doug Collins (coach)

== See also ==
- Pizza Hut All-Star Basketball Classic

== Sources ==
- All results and rosters
