= Vinnie Johnson =

American basketball player (born 1956)

Personal information
- Born: September 1, 1956 (age 70) Brooklyn, New York, U.S.
- Listed height: 6 ft 2 in (1.88 m)
- Listed weight: 200 lb (91 kg)

Career information
- High school: Franklin D. Roosevelt
- College: McLennan CC (1975–1977); Baylor (1977–1979)
- NBA draft: 1979: 1st round, 7th overall pick
- Drafted by: Seattle SuperSonics
- Playing career: 1979–1992
- Position: Shooting guard / point guard
- Number: 15, 25

Career history
- 1979–1981: Seattle SuperSonics
- 1981–1991: Detroit Pistons
- 1991–1992: San Antonio Spurs

Career highlights
- 2× NBA champion (1989, 1990); No. 15 retired by Detroit Pistons; Second-team All-American – AP (1979)

Career NBA statistics
- Points: 11,825 (12.0 ppg)
- Assists: 3,212 (3.3 apg)
- Rebound: 3,109 (3.2 rpg)
- Stats at NBA.com
- Stats at Basketball Reference

Vincent Johnson (born September 1, 1956) is an American former professional basketball player and a key player as sixth man for the Detroit Pistons during the team's National Basketball Association (NBA) championships of 1989 and 1990. He was nicknamed "the Microwave" in the NBA for his ability to score quickly off the bench. He also played for the Seattle SuperSonics and San Antonio Spurs.

== College basketball career ==
Johnson began his collegiate basketball career in 1975 at McLennan Community College in Waco, Texas. He was a star there for two years, leading the team to the NJCAA national tournament in the 1976–77 season while averaging 29 points per game and being named a junior college All-American.

Johnson transferred across town to attend Baylor University for the 1977–78 and 1978–79 seasons. One of the most prolific scorers in Baylor basketball history, Johnson averaged 24.1 points per game in his two seasons in Waco. A two-time All-American, Johnson is the school record-holder in points-per-game average, ranks 15th in career points, and third in career assists average at Baylor. He was named All-SWC in both 1978 and 1979. Johnson also holds the Baylor record for most points scored in a game with 50 against TCU in 1979.

== Professional basketball career ==
Johnson was chosen as the No. 7 overall pick in the 1979 NBA draft by the Seattle SuperSonics. He was traded to the Detroit Pistons in November 1981, in exchange for forward Greg Kelser. During the 1982-83 NBA season, Johnson scored a career high 15.8 points a game while starting in 51 of the 82 games he played in. For the rest of his career, he would mostly play as an important role player coming off the bench.

At 6 feet 2 inches tall, Johnson's skill set allowed him to come off the bench to replace either point guard Isiah Thomas or shooting guard Joe Dumars. Johnson earned the nickname "the Microwave" from Boston Celtics guard Danny Ainge for his ability to heat up an offense by scoring both fast and frequently when inserted into the game.

On June 14, 1990, Johnson made a championship-clinching 14-foot shot with 0.7 seconds left to beat the Portland Trail Blazers 92–90 in Game 5 of the NBA Finals. The shot, which gave Detroit a repeat championship, briefly earned Johnson a new nickname: 007.

Johnson left the Pistons following the 1990–91 season, playing a final season with the San Antonio Spurs before retiring from the NBA in 1992.

The Pistons honored Johnson's career by retiring his number 15 jersey in a ceremony on February 5, 1994, at The Palace of Auburn Hills. Johnson was influenced by New York City playground legend and basketball Hall of Famer Earl Monroe growing up, and only wore number 15 throughout most of his playing days until his final season when he wore 25 for the Spurs. When asked about it by a fan later he said, "It was a huge honor. The fact that they retired my jersey tells me that I did some great things for the organization."

== NBA career statistics ==
Legend
GP	Games played	GS	Games started	MPG	Minutes per game
FG%	Field goal percentage	3P%	3-point field goal percentage	FT%	Free throw percentage
RPG	Rebounds per game	APG	Assists per game	SPG	Steals per game
BPG	Blocks per game	PPG	Points per game	**Bold**	Career high
†	Won an NBA championship

=== Regular season ===
Year	Team	GP	GS	MPG	FG%	3P%	FT%	RPG	APG	SPG	BPG	PPG
1979–80	Seattle	38	—	8.6	.391	.000	**.795**	1.4	1.4	.5	.1	3.2
1980–81	Seattle	81	—	28.5	**.534**	.200	.793	**4.5**	**4.2**	1.0	.2	13.0
1981–82	Seattle	7	0	14.9	.409	.000	.750	2.1	1.6	.9	.3	3.9
1981–82	Detroit	67	15	17.8	.493	.273	.754	2.1	2.4	.7	.3	7.7
1982–83	Detroit	**82**	**51**	**30.6**	.513	.275	.778	4.3	3.7	1.1	**.6**	**15.8**
1983–84	Detroit	**82**	0	23.3	.473	.211	.753	2.9	3.3	.5	.2	13.0
1984–85	Detroit	**82**	16	25.5	.454	.185	.769	3.1	4.0	.9	.2	12.8
1985–86	Detroit	79	12	25.0	.467	.154	.771	2.9	3.4	1.0	.3	13.9
1986–87	Detroit	78	8	27.8	.462	.286	.786	3.3	3.8	**1.2**	.2	15.7
1987–88	Detroit	**82**	1	23.6	.443	.208	.677	2.8	3.3	.7	.2	12.2
1988–89†	Detroit	**82**	21	25.3	.464	.295	.734	3.1	3.0	.9	.2	13.8
1989–90†	Detroit	**82**	12	24.0	.431	.147	.668	3.1	3.1	.9	.2	9.8
1990–91	Detroit	**82**	28	29.1	.434	**.324**	.646	3.4	3.3	.9	.2	11.7
1991–92	San Antonio	60	23	22.5	.405	.317	.647	3.0	2.4	.7	.2	8.0
Career		984	187	24.7	.464	.254	.740	3.2	3.3	.9	.3	12.0

=== Playoffs ===
Year	Team	GP	GS	MPG	FG%	3P%	FT%	RPG	APG	SPG	BPG	PPG
1980	Seattle	5	—	2.4	.333	—	—	.4	.4	.2	.0	.4
1984	Detroit	5	—	26.4	.370	.000	**.895**	2.8	2.4	.2	.2	10.2
1985	Detroit	9	0	26.1	**.515**	.000	.786	3.0	3.2	.7	.1	14.2
1986	Detroit	4	0	21.3	.449	.000	.538	4.3	2.8	.8	.0	12.8
1987	Detroit	15	0	25.9	.459	.000	.861	2.9	**4.1**	.6	**.3**	14.7
1988	Detroit	**23**	0	20.7	.423	.143	.660	3.3	1.9	.7	.2	10.3
1989†	Detroit	17	0	21.9	.455	.417	.758	2.6	2.5	.2	.2	14.1
1990†	Detroit	20	0	23.2	.462	.286	.791	2.8	2.7	.4	.2	10.3
1991	Detroit	15	**3**	**29.2**	.464	.154	.710	**5.1**	2.9	.7	**.3**	**15.2**
1992	San Antonio	3	0	23.0	.458	**.500**	.500	2.7	2.3	**1.7**	**.3**	8.3
Career		116	3	23.0	.453	.274	.754	3.1	2.6	.6	.2	12.0

== Personal life ==
Johnson grew up in Brooklyn, New York, attending Franklin Delano Roosevelt High School. Johnson has a younger brother, Eric Johnson, who played a season in the NBA with the Utah Jazz.

Following his career with the Detroit Pistons, Johnson established Piston Automotive in 1995. The company found success as a supplier for major international automotive companies, particularly the Ford Motor Company and General Motors. Johnson serves as the Piston Group's chairman and chief executive officer. He has also served as the chairman of the board of directors for the joint ventures JL Automotive LLC and PASA Modules, LLC.

In addition to his post-playing career professional work, Johnson is a member of the Michigan Minority Business Development Council, and the Detroit Chamber of Commerce.

== See also ==
- Michigan Sports Hall of Fame
