= Earl Evans (basketball) =

American basketball player (1955–2012)

Personal information
- Born: November 11, 1955 Port Arthur, Texas, U.S.
- Died: December 24, 2012 (aged 57)
- Listed height: 6 ft 8 in (2.03 m)
- Listed weight: 202 lb (92 kg)

Career information
- High school: Lincoln (Port Arthur, Texas)
- College: USC (1974–1976); UNLV (1977–1979)
- NBA draft: 1978: 8th round, 157th overall pick
- Drafted by: Detroit Pistons
- Position: Power forward
- Number: 21

Career history
- 1979–1980: Detroit Pistons

Career highlights
- First-team Parade All-American (1974)
- Stats at NBA.com
- Stats at Basketball Reference

Earl Joseph Evans II (November 11, 1955 – December 24, 2012) was an American professional basketball forward who played one season in the National Basketball Association (NBA) as a member of the Detroit Pistons during the 1979–80 season. He attended University of Nevada, Las Vegas where he was selected by the Pistons during the eight round of the 1978 NBA draft.

== Career statistics ==
Legend
GP	Games played	GS	Games started	MPG	Minutes per game
FG%	Field goal percentage	3P%	3-point field goal percentage	FT%	Free throw percentage
RPG	Rebounds per game	APG	Assists per game	SPG	Steals per game
BPG	Blocks per game	PPG	Points per game	**Bold**	Career high

=== NBA ===
==== Regular season ====
Year	Team	GP	MPG	FG%	3P%	FT%	RPG	APG	SPG	BPG	PPG
1979–80	Detroit	36	10.6	.450	.389	.571	2.1	1.0	.4	.0	4.4
