= 1986 NBA Finals =

1986 basketball championship series

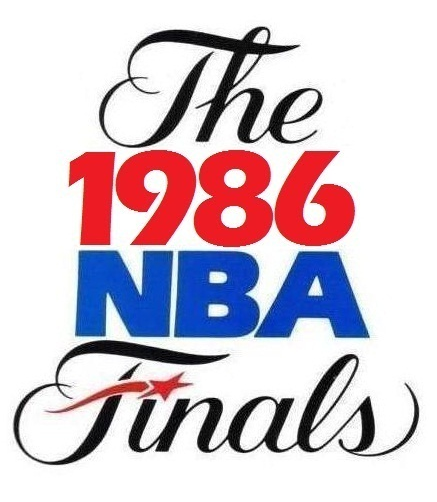
Team	Coach	Wins
Boston Celtics	K. C. Jones	4
Houston Rockets	Bill Fitch	2
- Dates: May 26 – June 8
- MVP: Larry Bird (Boston Celtics)
- Hall of Famers: Celtics: Larry Bird (1998); Dennis Johnson (2010); Kevin McHale (1999); Robert Parish (2003); Bill Walton (1993); Rockets: Hakeem Olajuwon (2008); Ralph Sampson (2012); Coaches: Bill Fitch (2019); K.C. Jones (1989, player); Rudy Tomjanovich (2020); Officials: Hugh Evans (2022); Darell Garretson (2016); Earl Strom (1995)
- Eastern finals: Celtics defeated Bucks, 4–0
- Western finals: Rockets defeated Lakers, 4–1

The 1986 NBA Finals was the championship series of the National Basketball Association's (NBA) 1985–86 season, and the culmination of the season's playoffs. It pitted the Eastern Conference champion Boston Celtics against the Western Conference champion Houston Rockets, in a rematch of the 1981 NBA Finals (though only Allen Leavell and Robert Reid remained from the Rockets' 1981 team). It was the second and last NBA Championship Series of the 1980s not to feature the Los Angeles Lakers, who were eliminated by the Rockets on both occasions. The heavily favored Celtics defeated the Rockets four games to two to win their then-record 16th NBA championship. The championship would be the Celtics' last until 2008. Larry Bird was named the Finals MVP.

On another note, this series marked the first time the "NBA Finals" branding was officially used, as they dropped the "NBA World Championship Series" branding which had been in use since the beginning of the league, though it had been unofficially called the "NBA Finals" for years.

Until the 2011 series, this was the last time the NBA Finals had started before June. Since game three, all NBA Finals games have been played in June. Starting with the following year, the NBA Finals would be held exclusively in the month of June. It was also the last NBA Finals series to schedule a game on a Monday until 1999 and also the last NBA Finals game to be played on Memorial Day. Until the 2018 series, it was the last to conclude before June 10.

CBS Sports used Dick Stockton and Tom Heinsohn as the play-by-play man and color commentator respectively. Meanwhile, Brent Musburger was the host and Pat O'Brien (the Rockets' sideline) and Lesley Visser (the Celtics' sideline) were the sideline reporters.

== Background ==
=== Boston Celtics ===
The Celtics made the 1985 NBA Finals, but lost in six games to the Los Angeles Lakers. The series exposed some of Boston's weaknesses, such as the lack of bench scoring, which was exploited after Kevin McHale moved to the starting lineup with Cedric Maxwell bothered by knee injuries. In addition, Larry Bird played through an elbow injury, which severely affected his shooting. In the offseason, president Red Auerbach decided to tweak the roster, trading Maxwell to the Los Angeles Clippers for oft-injured center Bill Walton. He also made a trade with the Indiana Pacers, acquiring Jerry Sichting for Quinn Buckner. These moves would pave the way for the Celtics' greatest season yet.

Entering the 1985–86 season, the Celtics surged to a league-best 67–15 record, powered by an NBA record 40 victories at home. Their incomparable home record alone (since tied by the San Antonio Spurs in the 2015–2016 regular season) put the Celtics in the conversation among the NBA's greatest teams in a single season.

In the playoffs, Boston needed just three games to defeat the Chicago Bulls in the first round, despite a playoff record 63 points by Michael Jordan in Game 2. When asked about Jordan's performance in Boston's 135–131 2OT victory, Boston's coach K. C. Jones said, "I don't have a word for today." In retrospect, this game is considered to be a classic clash of the NBA's (arguably) greatest player, Jordan, and the NBA's (arguably) greatest team, Bird's 1985–86 Celtics. In the second round, Boston eliminated the Atlanta Hawks in five games, with the clinching Game 5 a no-doubter as Boston outscored Atlanta 36–6 in the third quarter in route to a 132–99 victory. Then in the conference finals, Boston swept the Milwaukee Bucks in four games, a direct reversal of their second round meeting in the 1983 NBA playoffs.

=== Houston Rockets ===
Following their previous Finals appearance in 1981, the Rockets entered a brief rebuilding period. Long-time Rockets Calvin Murphy and Rudy Tomjanovich retired, while Mike Dunleavy, Sr., Bill Willoughby, Tom Henderson and Billy Paultz moved on to different teams. But the biggest move came during the 1982 offseason, when the Rockets traded Moses Malone to the 1983 champions Philadelphia 76ers. The loss of Malone sent the Rockets to a league-worst 14–68 record in the 1982–83 season, after which the Rockets were awarded the top pick of the 1983 NBA draft and selected Ralph Sampson.

After a 29-win season in 1984, the Rockets were once again rewarded with the top pick in the 1984 NBA draft. They selected another center in Akeem Olajuwon, and paired alongside Sampson, they were dubbed as the "Twin Towers". Houston also added some valuable role players to complement the duo and holdovers Allen Leavell and Robert Reid, acquiring Rodney McCray, Lewis Lloyd, Craig Ehlo, Mitchell Wiggins and Jim Petersen.

Under third-year head coach Bill Fitch (the head coach of the 1980–81 Celtics championship team), the Rockets posted a 51–31 record and won the Midwest Division title. In the first round, they swept the Sacramento Kings, then eliminated the Denver Nuggets in six games during the second round. In the conference finals, they were matched up against the defending champion Los Angeles Lakers, and after losing Game 1, the Rockets stunned the Lakers by winning the final four games, highlighted by a series-clinching buzzer beater by Sampson in Game 5.

=== Road to the Finals ===
Houston Rockets (Western Conference champion)		Boston Celtics (Eastern Conference champion)
# / Western Conference; # / Team / W / L / PCT / GB; 1 / c-Los Angeles Lakers / 62 / 20 / .756 / –; 2 / y-Houston Rockets / 51 / 31 / .622 / 11; 3 / x-Denver Nuggets / 47 / 35 / .573 / 15; 4 / x-Dallas Mavericks / 44 / 38 / .537 / 18; 5 / x-Utah Jazz / 42 / 40 / .512 / 20; 6 / x-Portland Trail Blazers / 40 / 42 / .488 / 22; 7 / x-Sacramento Kings / 37 / 45 / .451 / 25; 8 / x-San Antonio Spurs / 35 / 47 / .427 / 27; 9 / Phoenix Suns / 32 / 50 / .390 / 30; 10 / Los Angeles Clippers / 32 / 50 / .390 / 30; 11 / Seattle SuperSonics / 31 / 51 / .378 / 31; 12 / Golden State Warriors / 30 / 52 / .366 / 32; 2nd seed in the West, 5th best league record	Regular season	# / Eastern Conference; # / Team / W / L / PCT / GB; 1 / z-Boston Celtics / 67 / 15 / .817 / –; 2 / y-Milwaukee Bucks / 57 / 25 / .695 / 10; 3 / x-Philadelphia 76ers / 54 / 28 / .659 / 13; 4 / x-Atlanta Hawks / 50 / 32 / .610 / 17; 5 / x-Detroit Pistons / 46 / 36 / .561 / 21; 6 / x-Washington Bullets / 39 / 43 / .476 / 28; 7 / x-New Jersey Nets / 39 / 43 / .476 / 28; 8 / x-Chicago Bulls / 30 / 52 / .366 / 37; 9 / Cleveland Cavaliers / 29 / 53 / .354 / 38; 10 / Indiana Pacers / 26 / 56 / .317 / 41; 11 / New York Knicks / 23 / 59 / .280 / 44; 1st seed in the East, best league record
Defeated the (7) Sacramento Kings, 3–0	First round	Defeated the (8) Chicago Bulls, 3–0
Defeated the (3) Denver Nuggets, 4–2	Conference semifinals	Defeated the (4) Atlanta Hawks, 4–1
Defeated the (1) Los Angeles Lakers, 4–1	Conference finals	Defeated the (2) Milwaukee Bucks, 4–0

=== Regular season series ===
The Boston Celtics won both games in the regular season series:

March 11, 1986

Boston Celtics 116, Houston Rockets 104

The Summit, Houston, Texas

March 24, 1986

Houston Rockets 107, Boston Celtics 114

Boston Garden, Boston

== The Finals ==
The Larry Bird–led Celtics defeated the Rockets again 4 games to 2 in the 1986 NBA Finals. The Celtics won the first two games at the Boston Garden, where they had gone 40–1 during the regular season. The Rockets had been almost as good at home during the regular season, and they defeated the Celtics 106–104 in game three. Game 4 was a tense battle at the Summit, which the Celtics won 106–103, with Bill Walton coming off the bench for a tired Robert Parish to score a crucial basket. The infamous fifth game featured the signature moment of the series, when 7'4" Ralph Sampson ignited a brawl with Jerry Sichting, a player 15 inches (380 mm) shorter than Sampson, leading to his ejection. While Jim Petersen led the Rockets to a decisive victory, Sampson's actions motivated the Celtics to end the series in six. Bird dismantled the young Rockets in game 6; the raucous Garden crowd booed every time Sampson touched the ball. The Celtics eliminated the Rockets 114–97 in a game that wasn't as close as the score would indicate.

With backup forward Scott Wedman sidelined due to a wrist injury, Bird got very little rest during the six-game series, logging 269 out of a possible 288 minutes of floor time. Bird was named the Finals' MVP for that year, averaging 24 points, 9.7 rebounds, 9.7 assists, and 2.7 steals per game for the series. The Celtics' victory capped off a 29-year period that had seen them win 16 championships and it was their last championship until 2008.

== Series summary ==
Game	Date	Road team	Result	Home team
Game 1	May 26	Houston Rockets	100–112 (0–1)	Boston Celtics
Game 2	May 29	Houston Rockets	95–117 (0–2)	Boston Celtics
Game 3	June 1	Boston Celtics	104–106 (2–1)	Houston Rockets
Game 4	June 3	Boston Celtics	106–103 (3–1)	Houston Rockets
Game 5	June 5	Boston Celtics	96–111 (3–2)	Houston Rockets
Game 6	June 8	Houston Rockets	97–114 (2–4)	Boston Celtics

=== Game 1 ===
CBS

May 26
3:00 pm EDT

Houston Rockets 100, Boston Celtics 112
Scoring by quarter: 28–34, 31–27, 17–30, 24–21
Pts: Akeem Olajuwon 33; Rebs: Akeem Olajuwon 12; Asts: Robert Reid 8	Pts: Bird, McHale 21 each Rebs: Dennis Johnson 11; Asts: Larry Bird 13
Boston leads the series, 1–0

Boston Garden, Boston, Massachusetts
Attendance: 14,890
Referees:
- No. 14 Jack Madden
- No. 4 Ed T. Rush

The "Twin Towers" Ralph Sampson and Akeem Olajuwon were saddled with foul trouble for much of the game. Sampson got three quick fouls just 4:45 into the game and scored only two points; Olajuwon picked up five fouls despite scoring 33, 25 of which came in the first half. The backcourt tandem of Dennis Johnson and Danny Ainge provided the third quarter spurt for the Celtics, combining for 22 points, while Boston held Houston to just 17 points in an expected victory.

=== Game 2 ===
CBS

May 29
9:00 pm EDT

Houston Rockets 95, Boston Celtics 117
Scoring by quarter: 30–31, 20–29, 19–34, 26–23
Pts: Akeem Olajuwon 21; Rebs: Akeem Olajuwon 10; Asts: McCray, Reid 5 each	Pts: Larry Bird 31; Rebs: Larry Bird 8 Asts: Larry Bird 7
Boston leads the series, 2–0

Boston Garden, Boston, Massachusetts
Attendance: 14,890
Referees:
- No. 20 Jess Kersey
- No. 25 Hugh Evans

The third quarter again proved decisive for the Celtics, outscoring the Rockets 34–19 in the quarter. Sampson and Olajuwon combined for 32 points in the first half, but only seven in the second. Larry Bird paced the Celtics with 31 points on 12-for-19 shooting, while Kevin McHale added 25 in another Boston rout. It was Boston's 40th consecutive victory at home, regular season and playoffs combined.

=== Game 3 ===
CBS

June 1
3:30 pm EDT

Boston Celtics 104, Houston Rockets 106
Scoring by quarter: 29–33, 30–29, 25–18, 20–26
Pts: Kevin McHale 28; Rebs: Larry Bird 15; Asts: Larry Bird 11	Pts: Ralph Sampson 24; Rebs: Ralph Sampson 22; Asts: Robert Reid 9
Boston leads the series, 2–1

The Summit, Houston, Texas
Attendance: 16,016
Referees:
- No. 17 Joe Crawford
- No. 11 Jake O'Donnell

The Rockets rallied from eight points down in the fourth quarter before escaping to a much-needed two-point win at home, despite another third quarter meltdown. Sampson and Olajuwon combined for 47 points and 30 rebounds, Robert Reid added 20, while reserve guard Mitchell Wiggins tipped in off an Olajuwon miss late in the fourth to put the Rockets ahead for good. The Celtics only managed one more shot in their final two possessions, a missed 5-footer by Robert Parish. Kevin McHale and Larry Bird both scored 28 points in the loss, but Bird was held to 3-for-12 shooting in the second half due to Reid's defense.

=== Game 4 ===
CBS

June 3
9:00 pm EDT

Boston Celtics 106, Houston Rockets 103
Scoring by quarter: 30–30, 33–34, 23–21, 20–18
Pts: Robert Parish 22; Rebs: Robert Parish 15; Asts: Larry Bird 10	Pts: Ralph Sampson 25; Rebs: Akeem Olajuwon 14; Asts: Ralph Sampson 9
Boston leads the series, 3–1

The Summit, Houston, Texas
Attendance: 16,016
Referees:
- No. 10 Darell Garretson
- No. 12 Earl Strom

Larry Bird's three-pointer with 2:26 remaining gave Boston the lead for good, while holding the Rockets to just one basket in the final four minutes, keyed by Kevin McHale forcing three turnovers on Houston's final three possessions. Robert Parish scored 22 while hauling 15 rebounds. Dennis Johnson also added 22, while Bird scored 21 and dished out 10 assists. Ralph Sampson led the Rockets with 25 points, while Akeem Olajuwon, Robert Reid and Rodney McCray added 21, 19 and 17 respectively. The Rockets suffered their first home loss of the 1986 playoffs.

=== Game 5 ===
CBS

June 5
9:00 pm EDT

Boston Celtics 96, Houston Rockets 111
Scoring by quarter: 28–26, 19–32, 18–28, 31–25
Pts: Kevin McHale 33; Rebs: Kevin McHale 8 Asts: Danny Ainge 5	Pts: Akeem Olajuwon 32; Rebs: Akeem Olajuwon 14; Asts: Robert Reid 17
Boston leads the series, 3–2

The Summit, Houston, Texas
Attendance: 16,016
Referees:
- No. 25 Hugh Evans
- No. 14 Jack Madden

The game was highlighted by Ralph Sampson's ejection early in the second quarter. With 9:40 remaining in the second, Sampson threw punches at the Celtics' reserve guard Jerry Sichting, 16 inches shorter than Sampson, leading to his ejection while the benches were cleared. The Rockets were leading 34–33 at the time of the brawl, and would lead by as many as 25 points in the second half to score a lopsided victory. Akeem Olajuwon scored 32 points while blocking 8 shots. Though Kevin McHale scored 33, Larry Bird was held to only 17 points, ultimately leading to one of the worst losses suffered by the Celtics that season.

=== Game 6 ===
CBS

June 8
1:00 pm EDT

Houston Rockets 97, Boston Celtics 114
Scoring by quarter: 23–29, 15–26, 23–27, 36–32
Pts: Akeem Olajuwon 21; Rebs: Akeem Olajuwon 10; Asts: McCray, Reid 5 each	Pts: Larry Bird 29; Rebs: Larry Bird 11; Asts: Larry Bird 12
Boston wins the series, 4–2

Boston Garden, Boston, Massachusetts
Attendance: 14,890
Referees:
- No. 11 Jake O'Donnell
- No. 10 Darrell Garretson

Larry Bird recorded a triple-double of 29 points, 11 rebounds and 12 assists to pace a lopsided Boston win that clinched their 16th NBA championship. Kevin McHale added 29 points, 10 rebounds and four blocks. Olajuwon paced the Rockets with 21 points and 10 rebounds, but Ralph Sampson was held to only eight points on 4-for-12 shooting, visibly distracted by an angry Boston Garden crowd in the aftermath of Game 5. The Celtics led by as much as 30 in the fourth to put away the Rockets and finished the season with 41 straight home wins, regular season and playoffs.

Following the conclusion of the 1986 NBA Finals, a video documentary of the 1985–86 NBA season, known as "Sweet Sixteen", was released. David Perry was the narrator after Dick Stockton narrated the last three NBA season documentaries.

This would be the city of Boston's last professional sports championship until 2002 when the New England Patriots won Super Bowl XXXVI.

== Player statistics ==
Legend
GP	Games played	GS	Games started	MPG	Minutes per game
FG%	Field-goal percentage	3P%	3-point field-goal percentage	FT%	Free-throw percentage
RPG	Rebounds per game	APG	Assists per game	SPG	Steals per game
BPG	Blocks per game	PPG	Points per game

Boston Celtics

Boston Celtics statistics
Player	GP	GS	MPG	FG%	3P%	FT%	RPG	APG	SPG	BPG	PPG
Danny Ainge	6	6	35.5	.556	.500	.824	3.5	5.5	2.5	0.2	14.5
Larry Bird	6	6	44.8	.482	.368	.939	9.7	9.5	2.7	0.3	24.0
Rick Carlisle	3	0	2.7	1.000	.000	.000	0.0	1.0	0.0	0.0	2.0
Dennis Johnson	6	6	42.8	.420	.286	.821	6.2	5.3	2.0	0.3	17.0
Greg Kite	6	0	5.0	1.000	.000	1.000	1.0	0.3	0.2	0.2	1.0
Kevin McHale	6	6	40.2	.573	.000	.804	8.5	1.7	0.8	2.5	25.8
Robert Parish	6	6	31.8	.418	.000	.500	6.8	1.0	0.5	2.2	12.7
Jerry Sichting	6	0	14.2	.450	.000	.000	0.8	1.7	0.0	0.0	3.0
David Thirdkill	5	0	3.0	.200	.000	.500	0.4	0.2	0.4	0.0	0.6
Sam Vincent	4	0	3.0	.182	.000	.000	0.8	0.0	0.5	0.0	1.0
Bill Walton	6	0	19.5	.622	.000	.500	6.7	1.7	0.5	0.7	8.0
Scott Wedman	1	0	2.0	.000	.000	.000	0.0	0.0	0.0	0.0	0.0

Houston Rockets

Houston Rockets statistics
Player	GP	GS	MPG	FG%	3P%	FT%	RPG	APG	SPG	BPG	PPG
Craig Ehlo	4	0	2.5	.714	.000	.667	0.5	0.3	0.5	0.3	3.0
Steve Harris	4	0	6.8	.417	.000	.400	1.0	0.0	0.3	0.8	3.0
Allen Leavell	6	0	12.0	.382	.500	.800	0.8	3.0	0.7	0.0	5.7
Lewis Lloyd	6	6	22.3	.380	.000	.800	1.8	2.8	0.5	0.2	7.7
Rodney McCray	6	6	39.5	.588	.000	.706	4.0	4.0	1.2	0.8	15.3
Hank McDowell	5	0	1.8	.667	.000	.667	1.0	0.6	0.0	0.0	1.6
Akeem Olajuwon	6	6	40.2	.479	.000	.667	11.8	1.8	2.3	3.2	24.7
Jim Petersen	6	0	22.7	.311	.000	.750	7.2	1.8	0.7	0.5	5.2
Robert Reid	6	6	40.2	.420	.125	.917	4.3	8.7	1.3	0.0	14.3
Ralph Sampson	6	6	32.2	.438	.000	.731	9.5	3.3	1.0	0.8	14.8
Granville Waiters	4	0	1.8	1.000	.000	.000	0.8	0.0	0.0	0.5	1.0
Mitchell Wiggins	6	0	22.2	.451	.000	.667	3.7	1.3	0.8	0.2	8.3

== Team rosters ==
=== Boston Celtics ===
1985–86 Boston Celtics roster
Players

Pos.	No.	Player	Height	Weight	DOB	From
G/F	44	Danny Ainge	6 ft 4 in (1.93 m)	175 lb (79 kg)	1959–03–17	BYU
F	33	Larry Bird	6 ft 9 in (2.06 m)	220 lb (100 kg)	1956–12–07	Indiana State
G	34	Rick Carlisle	6 ft 5 in (1.96 m)	210 lb (95 kg)	1959–10–27	Virginia
G	3	Dennis Johnson	6 ft 4 in (1.93 m)	185 lb (84 kg)	1954–09–18	Pepperdine
C	50	Greg Kite	6 ft 11 in (2.11 m)	250 lb (113 kg)	1961–08–05	BYU
F/C	32	Kevin McHale	6 ft 10 in (2.08 m)	210 lb (95 kg)	1957–12–19	Minnesota
C	00	Robert Parish	7 ft 0 in (2.13 m)	230 lb (104 kg)	1953–08–30	Centenary
G	12	Jerry Sichting	6 ft 1 in (1.85 m)	168 lb (76 kg)	1956–11–29	Purdue
F	45	David Thirdkill	6 ft 7 in (2.01 m)	195 lb (88 kg)	1960–04–12	Bradley
G	11	Sam Vincent	6 ft 2 in (1.88 m)	185 lb (84 kg)	1963–05–18	Michigan State
C	5	Bill Walton	6 ft 11 in (2.11 m)	235 lb (107 kg)	1952–11–05	UCLA
G	8	Scott Wedman	6 ft 7 in (2.01 m)	215 lb (98 kg)	1952–07–29	Colorado
G/F	35	Sly Williams	6 ft 7 in (2.01 m)	210 lb (95 kg)	1958–01–26	Rhode Island

Coaches
Head coach
- K.C. Jones
Assistant(s)
- Ed Badger
- Chris Ford
- Jimmy Rodgers

Legend
- (DP) Unsigned draft pick
- (FA) Free agent
- (S) Suspended
- Injured

=== Houston Rockets ===
1985–86 Houston Rockets roster
Players

Pos.	No.	Player	Height	Weight	DOB	From
SG	3	Craig Ehlo	6 ft 8 in (2.03 m)	200 lb (91 kg)	1961–08–11	Washington State
SG	20	Steve Harris	6 ft 5 in (1.96 m)	195 lb (88 kg)	1963–10–15	Tulsa
PG	30	Allen Leavell	6 ft 1 in (1.85 m)	170 lb (77 kg)	1957–05–27	Oklahoma City
G/F	32	Lewis Lloyd	6 ft 6 in (1.98 m)	205 lb (93 kg)	1959–02–22	Drake
PG	5	John Lucas II	6 ft 3 in (1.91 m)	175 lb (79 kg)	1953–10–31	Maryland
SF	22	Rodney McCray	6 ft 7 in (2.01 m)	220 lb (100 kg)	1961–08–29	Louisville
F/C	8	Hank McDowell	6 ft 9 in (2.06 m)	215 lb (98 kg)	1959–11–13	Memphis
C	34	Akeem Olajuwon	7 ft 0 in (2.13 m)	255 lb (116 kg)	1963–01–21	Houston
F/C	43	Jim Petersen	6 ft 10 in (2.08 m)	235 lb (107 kg)	1962–02–22	Minnesota
G/F	33	Robert Reid	6 ft 8 in (2.03 m)	228 lb (103 kg)	1955–08–30	St. Mary's (Texas)
F/C	50	Ralph Sampson	7 ft 4 in (2.24 m)	200 lb (91 kg)	1960–07–07	Virginia
C	31	Granville Waiters	6 ft 11 in (2.11 m)	225 lb (102 kg)	1961–01–08	Ohio State
SG	15	Mitchell Wiggins	6 ft 4 in (1.93 m)	185 lb (84 kg)	1959–09–28	Florida State

Coaches
Head coach
- Bill Fitch
Assistant(s)
- Carroll Dawson
- Rudy Tomjanovich

Legend
- (DP) Unsigned draft pick
- (FA) Free agent
- (S) Suspended
- Injured

== Aftermath ==
The 1986–87 version of the Celtics were still a great team, but the death of #2 overall pick Len Bias less than two days after the 1986 NBA draft, and nagging injuries loomed heavily over their season. Kevin McHale broke his foot in March and the team was never the same. McHale kept playing on the foot despite being told not to by doctors. The battered and fatigued Celtics – with not just McHale, but also Parish (two sprained ankles), Ainge (leg injury) and Walton (broken foot) playing hurt – lost to the Lakers in six games in the 1987 NBA Finals. Afterwards, the Celtics entered a rare and unusual slump for the next two decades, and would not win the championship again until 2008, in which the Celtics defeated the Lakers in six games.

Years afterward, The Boston Globe sportswriter Bob Ryan would always consider this a win by proxy for the Celtics in their rivalry in the 1980s with the Lakers, as the Rockets had eliminated the Lakers in the Western Conference Finals in a convincing five games. Ryan would also say, "I believe the 1987 Lakers and the 1986 Celtics was the greatest series that never was".

Despite the Finals defeat, the Rockets looked poised to dominate the decade with the tandem of Akeem Olajuwon and Ralph Sampson. Instead, the team immediately disintegrated due to the rampant cocaine use of several key rotation players. The problem actually started prior to their 1986 postseason run when star guard John Lucas—the number one overall pick in the 1976 draft—was repeatedly suspended for using cocaine and ultimately waived by the team in March. Then, on January 14, 1987, commissioner David Stern suspended the team's starting guards Lewis Lloyd and Mitchell Wiggins for 2 1/2 years after they tested positive for cocaine. Because the players did not voluntarily enter a treatment program, they were banned by the league. "We had the makings of a good team, but the drug laws wiped us out", head coach Bill Fitch later stated.

The Rockets would not find championship success until the mid-1990s. With a revamped roster around Olajuwon, they returned to the Finals in 1994 and defeated the New York Knicks in seven games for their first championship. Then, the Rockets would repeat as champions the following season, sweeping the Shaquille O'Neal-led Orlando Magic.

The 1986 NBA Finals was the second of three "Big Four" championship rounds involving Boston-based sports teams to take place in the 1986 calendar year. In January, the New England Patriots lost to the Chicago Bears 46–10 in Super Bowl XX. Then in October, the Boston Red Sox lost in seven games to the New York Mets in the World Series. The Mets' prior victory in the National League Championship Series against the Houston Astros also prevented a second championship series in a calendar year between teams from Boston and Houston.

Kevin McHale would later coach the Rockets from 2011 to 2015.

== See also ==
- 1986 NBA playoffs
