= Ralph Sampson =

American basketball player (born 1960)

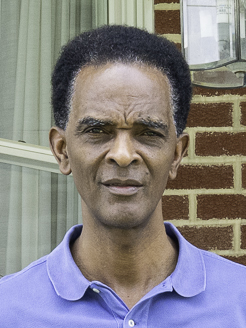
- Sampson in 2024

Personal information
- Born: July 7, 1960 (age 66) Harrisonburg, Virginia, U.S.
- Listed height: 7 ft 4 in (2.24 m)
- Listed weight: 228 lb (103 kg)

Career information
- High school: Harrisonburg (Harrisonburg, Virginia)
- College: Virginia (1979–1983)
- NBA draft: 1983: 1st round, 1st overall pick
- Drafted by: Houston Rockets
- Playing career: 1983–1995
- Position: Center / power forward
- Number: 50
- Coaching career: 1992–2013

Career history

Playing
- 1983–1987: Houston Rockets
- 1987–1989: Golden State Warriors
- 1989–1991: Sacramento Kings
- 1991–1992: Washington Bullets
- 1992: Unicaja Ronda
- 1994–1995: Rockford Lightning

Career highlights
- 4× NBA All-Star (1984–1987); NBA All-Star Game MVP (1985); All-NBA Second Team (1985); NBA Rookie of the Year (1984); NBA All-Rookie Team (1984); 3× National college player of the year (1981–1983); 3× Consensus first-team All-American (1981–1983); ACC Athlete of the Year (1983); 3× ACC Player of the Year (1981–1983); NIT MVP (1980); 3× First-team All-ACC (1981–1983); ACC Rookie of the Year (1980); No. 50 retired by Virginia Cavaliers; McDonald's All-American (1979); First-team Parade All-American (1979)

Career NBA statistics
- Points: 7,039 (15.4 ppg)
- Rebounds: 4,011 (8.8 rpg)
- Blocks: 752 (1.6 bpg)
- Stats at NBA.com
- Stats at Basketball Reference
- Basketball Hall of Fame
- Collegiate Basketball Hall of Fame
Medals
Representing United States
Men's basketball
Pan American Games
Gold medal – first place	1979 San Juan	Team competition

Ralph Lee Sampson Jr. (born July 7, 1960) is an American former professional basketball player. He is a member of the Naismith Memorial Basketball Hall of Fame. A 7-foot-4-inch (2.24 m) phenom, three-time college national player of the year, and first overall selection in the 1983 NBA draft, Sampson brought heavy expectations with him to the National Basketball Association (NBA).

The NBA Rookie of the Year, Sampson averaged 20.7 points and 10.9 rebounds for his first three seasons with the Houston Rockets before injuries began to take their toll. Three knee surgeries later, after 12 seasons in professional basketball, he retired in 1995 as a four-time NBA All-Star and the NBA All-Star Game Most Valuable Player (MVP) in the 1985 NBA All-Star Game.

== Early life ==
Sampson was born in Harrisonburg, Virginia on July 7, 1960, to Sarah and Ralph Sampson Sr. He was already 6 ft 7 in (2.01 m) tall by ninth grade, reaching 7 ft 1 in (2.16 m) in high school. He averaged nearly 30 points, 19 rebounds, and 7 blocked shots as a senior (after averaging 14 points and 11 rebounds as a sophomore, and 19 points and 17 rebounds as a junior), at Harrisonburg High, leading the team to state AA basketball championships in 1978 and 1979. Sampson earned unanimous All-America honors, starred in post-season all-star games and made the Pan Am Games team. His senior year he lost the high school player of the year award to another talented center, Sam Bowie. However, he did get a form of revenge against Bowie, outplaying him in the Capital Classic, getting 23 points and 21 rebounds with 4 blocks in a game styled "Battle of the Giants".

== College career ==
Sampson was arguably the most heavily recruited college basketball prospect of his generation and appeared on the cover of Sports Illustrated six times in a span of fewer than four years (December 17, 1979; December 1, 1980; March 30, 1981; November 29, 1982; December 20, 1982; and October 31, 1983).

Playing center for the University of Virginia, he led the Cavaliers to an NIT title in 1980, an NCAA Final Four appearance in 1981, and an NCAA Elite Eight appearance in 1983. He earned three Naismith Awards as the National Player of the Year, only the second athlete to do so (Bill Walton was the first), and a pair of Wooden Awards. Sampson considered leaving Virginia after his junior year and declaring for the 1982 NBA draft. The San Diego Clippers and Los Angeles Lakers would flip a coin to determine who would draft first overall, but the deadline for Sampson to make himself available came before the scheduled coin flip. Rather than risk playing for the Clippers (who ended up losing the toss), Sampson stayed in school.

== Professional career ==
=== Houston Rockets (1983–1987) ===
With his size and agility, Sampson was expected to revolutionize the center position with comparisons to previous legends at the position from Wilt Chamberlain to Bill Russell when he reached the National Basketball Association. The Houston Rockets picked him first overall in the 1983 NBA draft. As a rookie, he averaged 21.0 points and 11.1 rebounds, played in the All-Star Game, and won the NBA Rookie of the Year Award.

The Rockets managed only a 29–53 record in 1983–84, which qualified them to pick first in the 1984 NBA draft. Houston selected fellow center Hakeem Olajuwon out of the University of Houston. Many observers criticized the Rockets' choice, believing the two 7-footers (known as the Twin Towers) would not be effective playing together, while others thought the combination could be overpowering. Sampson, playing a new style of power forward, had new expectations placed upon him. At the time, Dallas Mavericks Coach Dick Motta said, "That front line, when history is written when they've grown up, might be the best-assembled on one team. Ever." Houston guard John Lucas said of Sampson's move to forward, "He'll revolutionize the game."

In 1984–85, the Rockets improved by 19 games to 48–34 and made the playoffs for the first time in three seasons. Sampson had his best individual campaign, averaging 22.1 points and 10.4 rebounds and earning a berth on the All-NBA Second Team. He and Olajuwon both played in the 1985 NBA All-Star Game, and Sampson, after scoring 24 points and grabbing 10 rebounds, earned the game's MVP Award. On March 5, 1985, in a loss against the Denver Nuggets, Sampson recorded 30 points, 15 rebounds, 8 assists, and 5 steals and was the first player in NBA history to record at least 30 points, 15 rebounds, 5 assists, and 5 steals since the league started recording steals.

The next season Houston won the Midwest Division with a 51–31 record. Sampson experienced his first scare with injury during a game on March 24, 1986, when an attempt to grab a rebound against the Boston Celtics saw him land awkwardly with his head driven into the court. He had a severely bruised back and missed three games; team president Ray Patterson later contended that Sampson was never quite the same after that injury. In total, he averaged 18.9 points with 11.1 rebounds and 3.6 assists in 79 total games that season. In the playoffs, the Rockets swept the Sacramento Kings, but faced a stiffer challenge against Alex English and the Denver Nuggets in the Conference Semi-Finals, eventually winning the series 4–2, with the sixth and deciding game going to double overtime. Against the defending champion Lakers in the Conference Finals, the Rockets were ready to knock off their rivals who had the best of them during the season. The Rockets lost game 1, but the Rockets fought back, winning four straight to take the series four games to one. In Game 5 of that series, Sampson provided one of the most memorable moments in NBA Playoff history. With the score tied at 112, Olajuwon having earlier been ejected, and with only one second remaining on the clock, Sampson took an inbounds pass and launched a twisting turnaround jumper that bounced twice, and went through the hoop at the buzzer, giving the Rockets a 114–112 victory and a shocking series upset.

In the NBA Finals, the Rockets faced the Boston Celtics. Boston sportswriters were not happy about not getting revenge against the Lakers who had beaten the Celtics in the Finals the year before, but the matchup was interesting with the young frontcourt challenging the old guard of the Celtics. During the season at the Boston Garden, the Rockets were playing the Celtics well until Sampson suffered a jarring fall on his back. At the start of the Finals, Sampson quickly found himself in foul trouble early in Game 1 as Boston easily went up 2-0 going back to Houston. The Rockets won a close Game 3 under the leadership of Sampson. Game 4 also went down to the wire with the Celtics pulling it out on late Larry Bird 3-pointer heroics and untimely turnovers by Rockets guard Mitch Wiggins. In a similarly close Game 5 in Houston (under the 2–3–2 format), Sampson succumbed to taunting by Boston's much smaller 6-foot-1 backup guard Jerry Sichting, resulting in Sampson taking a swing and earning an ejection from the game. Strangely, this fired up the Rockets, who won Game 5 by 15 points without him thanks to the inspired play of Olajuwon, Jim Petersen, and Robert "Bobby Jo" Reid. Game 6 went back to Boston with Sampson finding himself again in foul trouble and of little effect against the older and wiser Celtic frontcourt of Larry Bird, Kevin McHale and Robert Parish. After the series, Boston coach KC Jones called the Rockets "the new monsters on the block", with the future looking very bright for the Rockets. During the six-game championship series loss against the Celtics, Sampson averaged 14.8 points on .438 shooting, 9.5 rebounds and 3.3 assists per game.

In 1987, Sampson signed a $14.4 million contract for six years with the Rockets. Sampson made the All-Star team in the 1986–87 season, but he played in just 43 games that year. On February 4, 1987, he suffered a major cartilage tear in his left knee against the Denver Nuggets, which happened when his right foot slipped. He wore a knee brace and tried to play on it but left the game soon after. There were reports of him having slipped due to remnants of solvent used to clean off scuffs done on the court by a drill team practicing their show before the game. Sampson was expected to miss six weeks. He had arthroscopic surgery and rushed his rehab to make it back for the playoffs, a decision he has stated his regret over. In total, he had averaged 15.6 points with 8.7 rebounds and 2.8 assists while only starting in 32 games. That year, the Rockets made it to the Conference Semifinals, with Sampson appearing in each playoff game and averaging over 30 minutes a game, which saw him average over 15 points with eight rebounds. However, the Rockets lost in six games to the Seattle SuperSonics.

Injured nineteen games into the 1987–88 season, Sampson fell out of favor with Rockets coach Bill Fitch. He had averaged 15.9 points with 9.1 rebounds and 1.9 assists when he was traded on December 12, 1987, to the Golden State Warriors alongside reserve Steve Harris for Joe Barry Carroll, Sleepy Floyd, and cash; like Sampson, Carroll and Floyd had been NBA All-Stars in 1987.

=== Golden State Warriors (1987–1989) ===
Warriors general manager Don Nelson and coach George Karl believed that Sampson would be a key center threat for a team that was looking to build upon their 42-win season the previous year but had just a 3–15 record to start the year.

He played in 29 games for the Warriors while averaging 15.4 points with ten rebounds and 2.9 assists, but he was bothered by his left knee again, which required fluid to be drained out of it that made it less strong than his right knee; the Warriors won just 20 games that year. The following year, he played in 61 games with 36 as a starter, but he averaged just 6.4 points per game with five rebounds. The Warriors made the postseason that year and reached the second round, but Sampson only made appearance in the second round, playing 43 total minutes against the Phoenix Suns. He scored a total of 20 points with one assist and 14 rebounds in three combined games as the Warriors lost in five games. It was his last playoff appearance. He was traded to the Sacramento Kings on September 27, 1989, for Jim Petersen.

=== Sacramento Kings (1989–1991) ===
Sampson averaged 6.4 points and 5.0 rebounds with Golden State in 1988–89 and was traded during the offseason to the Sacramento Kings for Jim Petersen. Sampson's injury issues continued in Sacramento as he totaled just 51 games in two seasons, averaging 4.2 and 3.0 points, respectively, in 1989–90 and 1990–91.

=== Washington Bullets (1991–1992) ===
Released by the Kings, Sampson played a 10-game stint with the Washington Bullets in 1991–92 before being waived. He played 456 games in nine NBA seasons, which was 61.8% of the regular season games scheduled during his tenure.

=== Unicaja Ronda (1992) ===
Sampson played eight games for Unicaja Ronda of the Spanish League during the 1991–92 season.

=== Rockford Lightning (1994–1995) ===
Sampson also would play for the Rockford Lightning in the Continental Basketball Association during the 1994–95 season before he ultimately retired.

== Coaching career ==
Returning to the United States, Sampson spent the 1992–93 season as an assistant to head coach Lefty Driesell at James Madison University before coaching a minor league professional team in Richmond, Virginia, named the Richmond Rhythm.

In October 2012, Sampson joined the Phoenix Suns' player development staff. In June 2013, Sampson announced that he would not return as an assistant head coach.

== Legacy ==
In 1996, Sampson was inducted into the Virginia Sports Hall of Fame. In 2002, he was named to the ACC 50th Anniversary men's basketball team as one of the 50 greatest players in Atlantic Coast Conference history and one of only three Virginia Cavaliers so honored.

On November 22, 2011, Sampson was inducted into the National Collegiate Basketball Hall of Fame. In February 2012, Sampson was honored by Houston Rockets and fans as a member of the Decade Team of the 1980s. On April 2, 2012, Sampson was named a member of the Naismith Memorial Basketball Hall of Fame's induction class of 2012.

== Personal life ==
Sampson has four children with his ex-wife. Their oldest son, Ralph III, played collegiate basketball for Minnesota. Their younger son, Robert, transferred to Georgia Tech after playing his first three seasons (2010–2013) of college basketball for East Carolina University. They have two daughters: Rachel, who graduated from Stanford University and worked at ESPN, and Anna.

Sampson has four other children with four women, including daughters named Leah and India.

Sampson is the cousin of former NBA player, Jamal Sampson.

=== Legal issues ===
In 2005, Sampson pleaded guilty to owing more than $670K in back child support for two children from different mothers in the Northern Virginia area. In 2006, he was sentenced to two months in prison for mail fraud associated with the purchase of an SUV. In 2011, he was arrested and jailed in Gwinnett County, Georgia for having a suspended license and for an open arrest warrant on charges of failing to pay child support.

== Awards ==
- Naismith College Player of the Year (1981–1983)
- USBWA College Player of the Year (1981–1983)
- Adolph Rupp Trophy (1981–1983)
- Associated Press Player of the Year (1981–1983)
- UPI Player of the Year (1981–1983)
- John R. Wooden Award (1982–1983)
- NABC Player of the Year (1982–1983)
- Golden Plate Award of the American Academy of Achievement presented by Awards Council member Herschel Walker (1982)
- Sporting News Player of the Year (1983)
- Co-Helms Foundation College Basketball Player of the Year (1982)
- NBA Rookie of the Year (1984)
- NBA All-Rookie Team (1984)
- NBA All-Star Game MVP (1985)
- 4× NBA All-Star (1984–1987)
- All-NBA Second Team selection (1985)
- National Collegiate Basketball Hall of Fame inductee (2011)
- Naismith Basketball Hall of Fame inductee (2012)

== Career statistics ==
Legend
GP	Games played	GS	Games started	MPG	Minutes per game
FG%	Field goal percentage	3P%	3-point field goal percentage	FT%	Free throw percentage
RPG	Rebounds per game	APG	Assists per game	SPG	Steals per game
BPG	Blocks per game	PPG	Points per game	**Bold**	Career high

=== NBA ===
==== Regular season ====
Year	Team	GP	GS	MPG	FG%	3P%	FT%	RPG	APG	SPG	BPG	PPG
1983–84	Houston	**82**	**82**	32.8	**.523**	.250	.661	**11.1**	2.0	.9	**2.4**	21.0
1984–85	Houston	**82**	**82**	**37.6**	.502	.000	.676	10.4	2.7	1.0	2.0	**22.1**
1985–86	Houston	79	76	36.3	.488	.133	.641	**11.1**	**3.6**	**1.3**	1.6	18.9
1986–87	Houston	43	32	30.8	.489	.000	.624	8.7	2.8	.9	1.3	15.6
1987–88	Houston	19	19	37.1	.439	.333	.741	9.1	1.9	.9	1.7	15.9
1987–88	Golden State	29	25	33.0	.438	.000	**.775**	10.0	2.9	.8	1.9	15.4
1988–89	Golden State	61	36	17.8	.449	**.375**	.653	5.0	1.3	.5	1.1	6.4
1989–90	Sacramento	26	7	16.0	.372	.250	.522	3.2	1.1	.5	.8	4.2
1990–91	Sacramento	25	4	13.9	.366	.200	.263	4.4	.7	.4	.7	3.0
1991–92	Washington	10	0	10.8	.310	.000	.667	3.0	.4	.3	.8	2.2
Career		456	363	29.8	.486	.172	.661	8.8	2.3	.9	1.6	15.4
All-Star		3	2	22.0	.636	—	.700	6.3	.7	.0	.3	16.3

==== Playoffs ====
Year	Team	GP	GS	MPG	FG%	3P%	FT%	RPG	APG	SPG	BPG	PPG
1985	Houston	5	5	**38.6**	.430	**1.000**	.514	**16.6**	1.4	.4	1.6	**21.2**
1986	Houston	**20**	**20**	37.1	**.518**	**1.000**	.729	10.8	**4.0**	**1.5**	**1.8**	20.0
1987	Houston	10	10	33.0	.514	.500	**.814**	8.8	2.1	.2	1.2	18.6
1989	Golden State	3	1	14.3	.409	.000	.500	4.7	.3	.3	.7	6.7
Career		38	36	34.4	.497	.375	.703	10.5	2.9	.9	1.5	18.7

=== College ===
Year	Team	GP	GS	MPG	FG%	3P%	FT%	RPG	APG	SPG	BPG	PPG
1979–80	Virginia	**34**	—	29.9	.547	—	.702	11.2	1.1	**.8**	**4.6**	14.9
1980–81	Virginia	33	31	**32.0**	.557	—	.631	11.5	**1.5**	**.8**	3.1	17.7
1981–82	Virginia	32	31	31.3	.561	—	.615	11.4	1.2	.6	3.1	15.8
1982–83	Virginia	33	**33**	30.2	**.604**	—	**.704**	**11.7**	1.0	.6	3.1	**19.0**

== See also ==
- List of NBA single-game blocks leaders
- List of tallest players in NBA history
- List of NCAA Division I men's basketball players with 2000 points and 1000 rebounds
- List of All-Atlantic Coast Conference men's basketball teams

== Bibliography ==
- University of Virginia Basketball Media Guide (PDF copy available at www.virginiasports.com)
