= Robert Reid (basketball) =

American basketball player and coach (1955–2024)

Personal information
- Born: August 30, 1955 Atlanta, Georgia, U.S.
- Died: February 19, 2024 (aged 68) Houston, Texas, U.S.
- Listed height: 6 ft 8 in (2.03 m)
- Listed weight: 205 lb (93 kg)

Career information
- High school: Samuel Clemens (Schertz, Texas)
- College: St. Mary's (Texas) (1973–1977)
- NBA draft: 1977: 2nd round, 40th overall pick
- Drafted by: Houston Rockets
- Playing career: 1977–1992
- Position: Shooting guard / small forward
- Number: 50, 33

Career history

Playing
- 1977–1982, 1983–1988: Houston Rockets
- 1988–1989: Charlotte Hornets
- 1989: Portland Trail Blazers
- 1989–1990: Charlotte Hornets
- 1990–1991: Tulsa Fast Breakers
- 1991: Philadelphia 76ers
- 1991–1992: Tri-City Chinook

Coaching
- 1992–1993: Yakima Sun Kings
- 2003: Texas Rim Rockers
- 2004: Lakeland Blue Ducks
- 2004–2005: Debreceni Vadkakasok

Career NBA statistics
- Points: 10,448 (11.4 ppg)
- Rebounds: 4,168 (4.5 rpg)
- Assists: 2,500 (2.7 apg)
- Stats at NBA.com
- Stats at Basketball Reference

Robert Keith Reid (August 30, 1955 – February 19, 2024) was an American professional basketball player who played 13 seasons in the National Basketball Association (NBA).

== Career ==
The Atlanta-born 6'8" forward later moved to Texas where he attended Samuel Clemens High School in Schertz, Texas. He continued his basketball journey at St. Mary's University, Texas before being drafted by the Houston Rockets in the second round of the 1977 NBA Draft. Robert "Bobby Joe" Reid played 13 seasons (1977–1982; 1983–1991) in the NBA as a member of the Houston Rockets, Charlotte Hornets, Portland Trail Blazers, and Philadelphia 76ers. He had his best overall season in 1980-81, when he was the second leading scorer on the Rockets team that reached the NBA Finals, where he led all scorers in Game 1 with 27 points, before losing to the Boston Celtics. The following year, after the Rockets traded reigning MVP Moses Malone to the Philadelphia 76ers, Reid unexpectedly retired from basketball and moved to Miami, Florida to focus on his Pentecostal faith. After a year away from the NBA, he returned to Houston after they drafted Ralph Sampson with the first overall pick in the 1983 NBA draft. One of Reid's most notable moments in the NBA was his three-point shot in Game 5 of the 1986 Western Conference Finals against the Los Angeles Lakers that tied the game with just seconds left, helping rally the Rockets into defeating the Lakers and reaching the 1986 NBA Finals. Robert Reid is one of the earliest pioneers of the point forward role in NBA history. While with the Houston Rockets, coach Del Harris openly recognized him as such. Reid's versatility was demonstrated by his 8.7 assists per game in the 1986 NBA Finals and the effective use of him, a natural forward, as a point guard.

When he concluded his NBA career in 1991, Reid had tallied 10,448 career points, 4,168 career rebounds, and 2,500 career assists.

== Personal life ==
In recent years, Reid hosted basketball clinics for young athletes in several countries, such as India.

Reid died at the age of 68 at his home in Houston, Texas, on February 19, 2024, from cancer.

== Career statistics ==
Legend
GP	Games played	GS	Games started	MPG	Minutes per game
FG%	Field goal percentage	3P%	3-point field goal percentage	FT%	Free throw percentage
RPG	Rebounds per game	APG	Assists per game	SPG	Steals per game
BPG	Blocks per game	PPG	Points per game	**Bold**	Career high
*	Led the league

=== NBA ===
==== Regular season ====
Year	Team	GP	GS	MPG	FG%	3P%	FT%	RPG	APG	SPG	BPG	PPG
1977–78	Houston	80		23.1	.455		.656	4.5	1.5	.8	.6	7.3
1978–79	Houston	**82***		27.5	**.492**		.704	5.9	2.8	.9	.6	10.9
1979–80	Houston	76		30.3	.487	.000	.736	5.8	3.2	1.7	.8	13.0
1980–81	Houston	**82**	**82**	36.1	.482	.000	.756	**7.1**	4.2	**2.0**	.8	**15.9**
1981–82	Houston	77	75	**37.8**	.456	.100	.748	6.6	4.1	1.5	.6	13.4
1983–84	Houston	64	28	30.3	.474	.250	.659	5.3	3.4	1.4	.5	14.0
1984–85	Houston	**82***	0	21.5	.481	.063	.698	3.3	2.1	.6	.3	8.7
1985–86	Houston	**82**	5	26.3	.464	.182	.757	3.7	2.7	1.1	.2	12.0
1986–87	Houston	75	63	34.6	.417	.327	.768	3.9	**4.3**	1.0	.3	13.7
1987–88	Houston	62	31	15.8	.463	**.382**	**.794**	2.0	1.1	.4	.1	6.3
1988–89	Charlotte	**82***	54	26.2	.428	.327	.776	3.7	1.9	.6	.2	14.7
1989–90	Portland	12	1	7.1	.394	.333	.500	.7	.7	.2	.2	2.6
1989–90	Charlotte	60	27	18.6	.391	.310	.641	2.4	1.4	.6	.2	6.4
1990–91	Philadelphia	3	0	12.3	.143	–	–	3.0	1.3	.3	**1.0**	1.3
Career		919	366	27.3	.458	.291	.732	4.5	2.7	1.1	.4	11.4

==== Playoffs ====
Year	Team	GP	GS	MPG	FG%	3P%	FT%	RPG	APG	SPG	BPG	PPG
1979	Houston	2		22.5	.412		.667	4.5	1.0	.5	1.0	10.0
1980	Houston	7		38.0	**.510**	.000	**.846**	7.9	3.7	.9	1.0	**18.0**
1981	Houston	**21***		41.3	.459	.000	.663	6.8	4.7	**2.4**	**1.1**	16.1
1982	Houston	3		38.3	.484	–	.800	**8.7**	3.0	1.7	.7	11.3
1985	Houston	5	0	17.4	.422	.000	–	3.4	1.0	.8	.4	7.6
1986	Houston	20*	**20***	38.7	.431	.143	.797	4.2	**6.9**	1.4	.1	14.9
1987	Houston	10	10	**43.1**	.361	.118	.652	3.6	4.8	1.0	.3	12.9
1988	Houston	4	4	28.5	.455	**.429**	.667	3.8	2.0	.5	.0	8.8
1991	Philadelphia	7	0	5.9	.333	.000	–	1.1	.3	.1	.0	.9
Career		79	34	34.7	.437	.151	.724	4.9	4.2	1.3	.5	13.0
