= Jim Petersen =

American basketball player (born 1962)

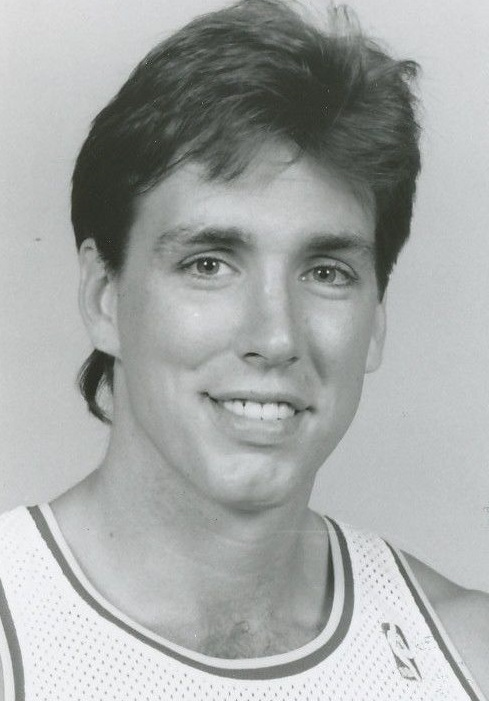
- Petersen in 1988

Personal information
- Born: February 22, 1962 (age 64) Minneapolis, Minnesota, U.S.
- Listed height: 6 ft 10 in (2.08 m)
- Listed weight: 235 lb (107 kg)

Career information
- High school: Saint Louis Park (St. Louis Park, Minnesota)
- College: Minnesota (1980–1984)
- NBA draft: 1984: 3rd round, 51st overall pick
- Drafted by: Houston Rockets
- Playing career: 1984–1992
- Position: Power forward / center
- Number: 43
- Coaching career: 2008–2017

Career history

Playing
- 1984–1988: Houston Rockets
- 1988–1989: Sacramento Kings
- 1989–1992: Golden State Warriors

Coaching
- 2008–2017: Minnesota Lynx (assistant)

Career highlights
- Third-team Parade All-American (1980); McDonald's All-American (1980); Minnesota Mr. Basketball (1980)

Career NBA statistics
- Points: 3,397 (6.9 ppg)
- Rebounds: 2,354 (4.8 rpg)
- Assists: 487 (1.0 apg)
- Stats at NBA.com
- Stats at Basketball Reference

James Richard Petersen (born February 22, 1962) is an American former professional basketball player, and a current television analyst with the Minnesota Timberwolves. From 2009 to 2017 he served as an assistant coach and later associate head coach for the Minnesota Lynx of the WNBA. He played as both a power forward and a center.

== Basketball career ==
=== High school / college ===
Petersen, a St. Louis Park native, played high school basketball at St. Louis Park High School, being named Minnesota's Mr. Basketball in 1980, as well as being the first McDonald's All-American from the state of Minnesota.

Born in Minneapolis, Minnesota, he then went on to be a four-year letter winner at the University of Minnesota, and a member of the 1982 Big Ten Championship team that featured future NBA veterans Trent Tucker and Randy Breuer.

=== NBA ===
Petersen was selected by the Houston Rockets in the third round (51st overall) of the 1984 NBA draft, alongside Hakeem Olajuwon. In the following four seasons, he played with the Texas club, backing up both Olajuwon and Ralph Sampson, who were known as the Twin Towers. Petersen played in 20 post-season games (averaging six points and six rebounds) as the team reached the NBA Finals, losing 2–4 to the Boston Celtics. In the 1986–87 season, as Sampson began to struggle with injuries, Petersen achieved career-best averages of 11 points and seven rebounds, playing in all 82 games and starting in 56.

In 1988, Peterson was traded with Rodney McCray to the Sacramento Kings for Otis Thorpe. A year later, he was traded to the Golden State Warriors for former teammate Ralph Sampson. Petersen retired in 1992 at the age of 30, after four seasons with the Rockets, one season with the Kings, and three seasons with the Warriors, with totals of 491 games and 3,397 points.

== Post-retirement ==
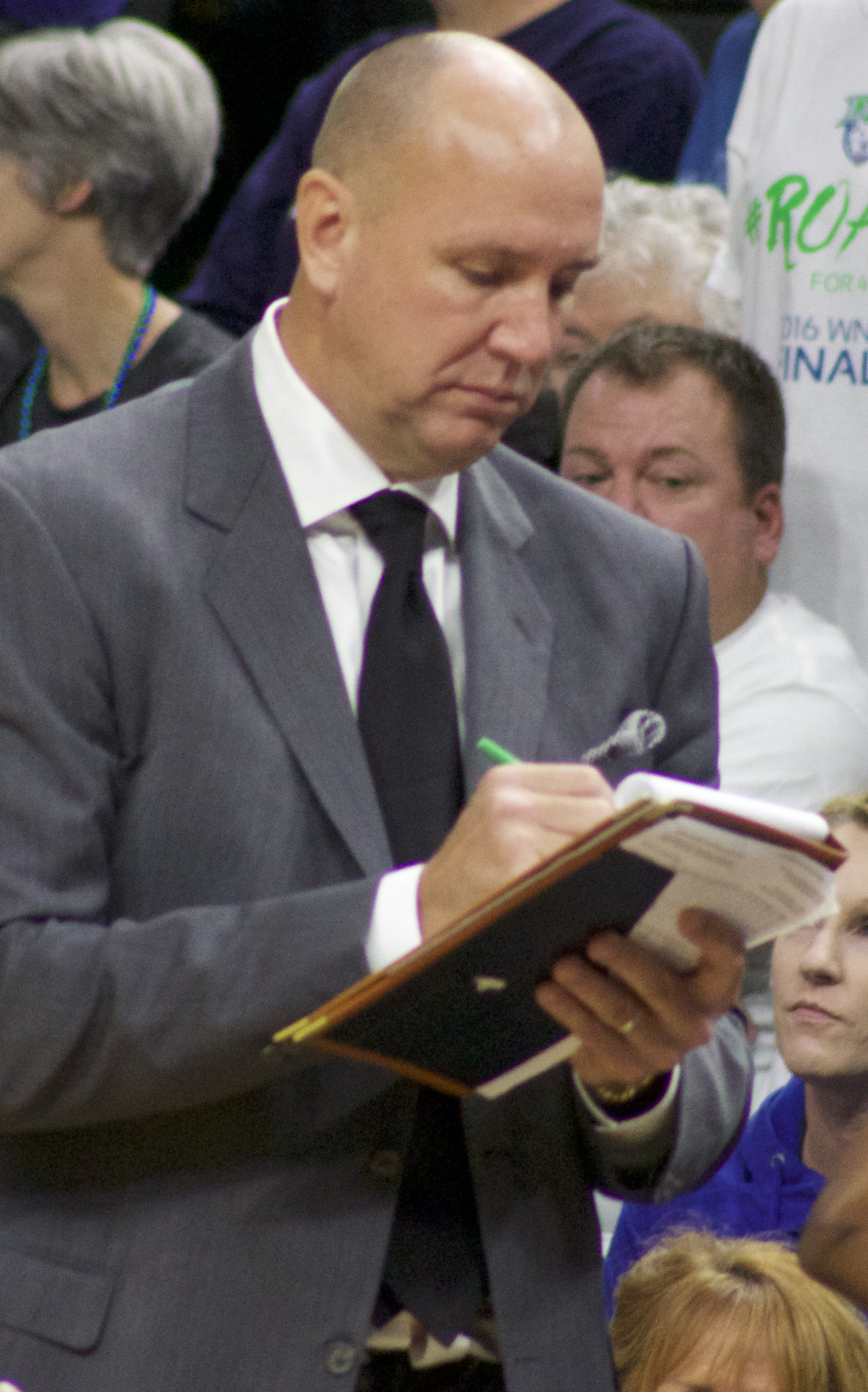
Petersen in 2016, as associate head coach of the Lynx.

After leaving the NBA, Petersen worked for the National Basketball Players Association in their player programs division, facilitating seminars in NBA locker rooms in topics such as HIV and AIDS, financial planning, substance abuse and career planning for life after basketball. He also coached junior high, high school and AAU basketball teams in La Jolla, California and Minneapolis.

He has worked as a television analyst with the Minnesota Timberwolves since 2003; prior to that he was a radio analyst since 1998. As a broadcaster, Petersen has been acclaimed for his deep knowledge of basketball and detailed commentary on the nuances of the game. In November 2008, Petersen was named assistant coach of the WNBA's Minnesota Lynx; in 2016 he was named Associate Head Coach. In January 2017, he announced he was stepping down as associate head coach. As of 2026, Petersen provides color commentary for Minnesota Timberwolves games on DAZN and previously FanDuel Sports Network.

He resides in Wayzata, Minnesota, with his wife Tika. His stepson Sanjay Lumpkin, a current assistant coach for the Atlanta Hawks also played college basketball for Northwestern University.

== Career statistics ==
Legend
GP	Games played	GS	Games started	MPG	Minutes per game
FG%	Field goal percentage	3P%	3-point field goal percentage	FT%	Free throw percentage
RPG	Rebounds per game	APG	Assists per game	SPG	Steals per game
BPG	Blocks per game	PPG	Points per game	**Bold**	Career high
*	Led the league

=== NBA ===
==== Regular season ====
Year	Team	GP	GS	MPG	FG%	3P%	FT%	RPG	APG	SPG	BPG	PPG
1984–85	Houston	60	0	11.9	.486	–	**.758**	2.5	.5	.2	.5	3.2
1985–86	Houston	**82**	20	20.3	.477	.000	.706	4.8	1.0	.5	.7	6.2
1986–87	Houston	**82***	**56**	**29.3**	**.511**	.000	.727	**6.8**	**1.5**	.5	**1.2**	**11.3**
1987–88	Houston	69	50	26.0	.510	.167	.745	6.3	**1.5**	.5	.6	8.9
1988–89	Sacramento	66	40	24.7	.459	.000	.747	6.3	1.2	**.7**	1.0	10.2
1989–90	Golden State	43	19	13.8	.426	.000	.712	3.7	.5	.4	.5	4.0
1990–91	Golden State	62	21	13.5	.483	**.250**	.658	3.2	.4	.2	.7	4.5
1991–92	Golden State	27	2	6.3	.450	.000	.700	1.7	.3	.2	.2	1.6
Career		491	208	20.0	.486	.071	.725	4.8	1.0	.4	.7	6.9

==== Playoffs ====
Year	Team	GP	GS	MPG	FG%	3P%	FT%	RPG	APG	SPG	BPG	PPG
1985	Houston	3	.0	2.7	**1.000**	–	–	.7	.3	.0	.0	.7
1986	Houston	**20**	0	18.9	.407	–	**.697**	**5.6**	1.1	**.5**	**.5**	5.6
1987	Houston	10	0	18.7	.549	–	.667	4.6	.6	**.5**	.2	6.8
1988	Houston	4	0	**24.5**	.522	–	.583	5.3	**1.5**	.3	**.5**	**7.8**
1991	Golden State	9	**4**	13.0	.706	–	.625	3.0	.3	.2	.4	3.2
Career		46	4	17.1	.485	–	.662	4.5	.8	.4	.4	5.2
