= Allen Leavell =

American basketball player (born 1957)

Personal information
- Born: May 27, 1957 (age 69) Muncie, Indiana, U.S.
- Listed height: 6 ft 1 in (1.85 m)
- Listed weight: 170 lb (77 kg)

Career information
- High school: Muncie Central (Muncie, Indiana)
- College: Oklahoma City (1975–1979)
- NBA draft: 1979: 5th round, 104th overall pick
- Drafted by: Houston Rockets
- Playing career: 1979–1992
- Position: Point guard
- Number: 30

Career history
- 1979–1989: Houston Rockets
- 1989–1990: Tulsa Fast Breakers
- 1991–1992: Rockford Lightning
- 1992: Winnipeg Thunder

Career NBA statistics
- Points: 6,684 (9.5 ppg)
- Rebounds: 1,164 (1.7 rpg)
- Assists: 3,339 (4.8 apg)
- Stats at NBA.com
- Stats at Basketball Reference

Allen Frazier Leavell (born May 27, 1957) is an American former professional basketball player from Muncie, Indiana. He had a ten-year career in the National Basketball Association (NBA).

== Career ==
=== Amateur ===
At Muncie Central High School, Leavell averaged 18 points per game in his final year. A 6-foot-1-inch (1.85 m), 170-pound (77 kg) point guard, he enrolled in Oklahoma City University and played for the then-Division 1 Men's Basketball Team, averaging 22 points in 1978–1979.

=== Playing career ===
Leavell was selected in the fifth round of the 1979 NBA draft by the Houston Rockets, going on to play ten seasons in the NBA, all as a member of the Rockets, appearing in exactly 700 games in the regular season. On January 25, 1983, he set a franchise record with 22 assists in a game. Over the whole 1982–1983 season, he was the team's leaders in points, steals, and assists.

Leavell was waived early in the 1986–87 season by the Rockets and then signed again a few months later after the team lost two players due to drug suspensions.

In his NBA career, he averaged 9.5 points per game and 4.8 assists per game. Leavell participated in two NBA Finals (in 1981 and 1986), in two losses against the Boston Celtics. He finishes as the third all-time with the Rocket Franchise in both assists (3,339) and steals (929).

In 1989, he joined the Continental Basketball Association playing for the Tulsa Fastbreakers but was suspended after assaulting a referee.

=== Post-NBA ===
As someone who played exclusively with the Houston Rockets within the NBA, Leavell remained involved in the team, participating in community outreach and serving as commentator with local outlets.

He is inducted into the Oklahoma City University Hall of Fame.

== Career statistics ==
Legend
GP	Games played	GS	Games started	MPG	Minutes per game
FG%	Field goal percentage	3P%	3-point field goal percentage	FT%	Free throw percentage
RPG	Rebounds per game	APG	Assists per game	SPG	Steals per game
BPG	Blocks per game	PPG	Points per game	**Bold**	Career high
*	Led the league

=== NBA ===
==== Regular season ====
Year	Team	GP	GS	MPG	FG%	3P%	FT%	RPG	APG	SPG	BPG	PPG
1979–80	Houston	77		27.6	**.503**	.158	.814	2.4	5.4	1.6	**.4**	10.9
1980–81	Houston	79		21.3	.471	.118	.832	1.7	4.9	1.2	.2	8.1
1981–82	Houston	79	61	27.2	.467	.290	.852	2.1	5.8	1.9	.2	10.9
1982–83	Houston	79	**76**	**32.9**	.415	.240	.832	**2.5**	**6.7**	**2.1**	.2	**14.8**
1983–84	Houston	**82***	27	24.5	.477	.155	.832	1.4	5.6	1.3	.1	11.5
1984–85	Houston	42	0	12.8	.421	.216	.772	.9	2.4	.5	.1	5.4
1985–86	Houston	74	12	16.1	.463	**.358**	.854	.9	3.2	.8	.1	7.9
1986–87	Houston	53	11	22.2	.411	.316	.840	1.2	4.2	1.0	.2	7.8
1987–88	Houston	80	54	26.9	.437	.216	**.869**	1.9	5.1	1.6	.1	10.2
1988–89	Houston	55	3	11.4	.346	.122	.733	1.0	2.3	.5	.1	3.3
Career		700	244	23.2	.450	.234	.834	1.7	4.8	1.3	.2	9.5

==== Playoffs ====
Year	Team	GP	GS	MPG	FG%	3P%	FT%	RPG	APG	SPG	BPG	PPG
1980	Houston	7		21.3	.263	.000	.905	1.7	3.4	.9	.0	5.6
1981	Houston	**17**		12.8	.390	–	.882	1.0	2.6	1.1	.2	4.4
1982	Houston	3		31.0	**.426**	.000	**1.000**	1.7	3.3	1.3	**.3**	14.0
1985	Houston	5	0	3.2	.333	.000	**1.000**	.6	.6	.0	.0	1.2
1986	Houston	15	0	11.3	.300	**.467**	.870	1.0	2.7	.6	.0	5.0
1987	Houston	10	**10**	**38.4**	.411	.250	.817	**2.5**	**7.2**	**1.9**	**.3**	**14.1**
1988	Houston	4	0	9.5	.368	.333	**1.000**	.8	2.3	.5	.0	5.0
1989	Houston	2	0	2.5	.333	–	**1.000**	.0	.5	.0	.0	2.0
Career		63	10	17.0	.366	.295	.863	1.3	3.2	.9	.1	6.4

== See also ==
- List of National Basketball Association players with most assists in a game
- List of NBA players who have spent their entire career with one franchise
