= Granville Waiters =

American basketball player (1961–2021)

Personal information
- Born: January 8, 1961 Columbus, Ohio, U.S.
- Died: March 23, 2021 (aged 60) Columbus, Ohio, U.S.
- Listed height: 6 ft 11 in (2.11 m)
- Listed weight: 225 lb (102 kg)

Career information
- High school: Columbus East (Columbus, Ohio)
- College: Ohio State (1979–1983)
- NBA draft: 1983: 2nd round, 39th overall pick
- Drafted by: Portland Trail Blazers
- Playing career: 1983–1990
- Position: Center
- Number: 31

Career history
- 1983–1985: Indiana Pacers
- 1985–1986: Houston Rockets
- 1986–1988: Chicago Bulls
- 1988–1989: FC Barcelona
- 1989–1990: Cajabilbao

Career NBA statistics
- Points: 606 (2.4 ppg)
- Rebounds: 540 (2.2 rpg)
- Blocks: 185 (0.7 bpg)
- Stats at NBA.com
- Stats at Basketball Reference

Granville S. Waiters (January 8, 1961 – March 23, 2021) was an American professional basketball player.

== Career ==
At 6 ft 11 in (2.11 m) and 225 lb (102 kg), Waiters played center. As a senior in high school, Waiters helped Columbus East to a state championship over St. Joseph, who were led by his eventual Buckeyes and Pacers teammate Clark Kellogg. During the 1982–83 season for Ohio State, he was a team captain and averaged 10.4 points and 7.5 rebounds per game.

He was drafted by the Portland Trail Blazers in the second round of the 1983 NBA draft. The Blazers sold his draft rights to the Indiana Pacers, and Waiters spent his first two seasons in Indiana. He would be the last Pacer to wear #31 before the arrival of Reggie Miller. He then played one year for the Houston Rockets which saw him make an appearance in the 1986 NBA Finals and then two years for the Chicago Bulls, before he left the NBA for Europe in 1988. On Waiters’ role as a key bench player focused on defense and rebounding on the early Jordan Bulls, head coach Doug Collins said "He never complained. He played his heart out. He was an awesome guy, a gentle giant off the court..." Waiters averaged 2.4 points and 2.2 rebounds throughout his NBA career.

From 1988 to 1990, Waiters played in the Spanish league as a member of FC Barcelona Basquet and Cajabilbao. Until his death, he was involved with humanitarian efforts in his native Ohio.

== Death ==
Following a hospitalization for COVID-19, Waiters died at his home in Columbus on March 23, 2021, at the age of 60. On his death, former teammate Brad Sellers said "…he taught young players like me what it was to be a professional, how to be appreciative of your moment. He was a great guy to have in the locker room. Granville was like, ‘Listen here, work hard, do your part.' He always acted older than he was, carried himself like that. Just a good guy to be around and have as a teammate."

== Career statistics ==
Legend
GP	Games played	GS	Games started	MPG	Minutes per game
FG%	Field goal percentage	3P%	3-point field goal percentage	FT%	Free throw percentage
RPG	Rebounds per game	APG	Assists per game	SPG	Steals per game
BPG	Blocks per game	PPG	Points per game	**Bold**	Career high

=== NBA ===
==== Regular season ====
Year	Team	GP	GS	MPG	FG%	3P%	FT%	RPG	APG	SPG	BPG	PPG
1983–84	Indiana	**78**	8	**13.3**	**.517**	.000	**.608**	**2.9**	**.8**	**.3**	**1.1**	**3.6**
1984–85	Indiana	62	5	11.3	.447	.000	.580	2.7	.5	**.3**	.7	3.2
1985–86	Houston	43	0	3.6	.333	.000	.167	.7	.2	.1	.2	.6
1986–87	Chicago	44	**26**	12.1	.430	.000	.556	2.0	.5	.2	.7	1.9
1987–88	Chicago	22	0	5.2	.310	.000	.000	1.3	.0	.1	.7	.8
Career		249	39	10.2	.458	.000	.559	2.2	.5	.2	.7	2.4

==== Playoffs ====
Year	Team	GP	GS	MPG	FG%	3P%	FT%	RPG	APG	SPG	BPG	PPG
1986	Houston	**11**	0	2.4	**.571**	–	–	**.5**	.0	**.1**	.3	**.7**
1987	Chicago	2	0	**4.0**	–	–	–	**.5**	.0	.0	**.5**	.0
Career		13	0	2.6	.571	–	–	.5	.0	.1	.3	.6
