= Rodney McCray (basketball) =

American basketball player (born 1961)

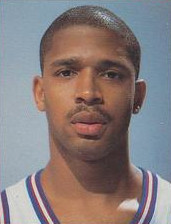

Personal information
- Born: August 29, 1961 (age 65) Mount Vernon, New York, U.S.
- Listed height: 6 ft 8 in (2.03 m)
- Listed weight: 220 lb (100 kg)

Career information
- High school: Mount Vernon (Mount Vernon, New York)
- College: Louisville (1979–1983)
- NBA draft: 1983: 1st round, 3rd overall pick
- Drafted by: Houston Rockets
- Playing career: 1983–1993
- Position: Small forward
- Number: 22, 1

Career history
- 1983–1988: Houston Rockets
- 1988–1990: Sacramento Kings
- 1990–1992: Dallas Mavericks
- 1992–1993: Chicago Bulls

Career highlights
- NBA champion (1993); NBA All-Defensive First Team (1988); NBA All-Defensive Second Team (1987); NCAA champion (1980); Metro Conference Player of the Year (1983); First-team All-Metro Conference (1983); Fourth-team Parade All-American (1979)

Career statistics
- Points: 9,014 (11.7 ppg)
- Rebounds: 5,087 (6.6 rpg)
- Assists: 2,750 (3.6 apg)
- Stats at NBA.com
- Stats at Basketball Reference

Rodney Earl McCray (born August 29, 1961) is an American former professional basketball player. A 6'8" small forward, he spent 10 seasons (1983–93) in the National Basketball Association (NBA), tallying 9,014 career points and 5,087 career rebounds.

== College career ==
McCray attended the University of Louisville and was a key member of the Cardinals team that won the 1980 NCAA Men's Division I Basketball Championship. His college teammates included his brother, Scooter McCray, as well as Darrell Griffith and Derek Smith. McCray qualified for the 1980 U.S. Olympic team but was unable to compete due to the 1980 Summer Olympics boycott. In 2007, he did receive one of 461 Congressional Gold Medals created especially for the spurned athletes.

== Professional career ==
He was drafted by the Houston Rockets with the third pick of the 1983 NBA Draft, playing four seasons with them. Averaging 10.8 points per game in Houston, he further averaged double-digit scoring in eight of his first nine seasons. Starting from the Rockets’ 1986 season – when Robert Reid shifted to point guard – McCray took on an expanded role as a forward, with the offense running more frequently through him. Contemporary coverage described him as a point forward, a role that was rarely defined or discussed at the time.

In his prime, he was also among the league's elite point-of-attack defenders, earning NBA All-Defensive Team honors in 1987 and 1988, as well as a trip to the NBA Finals in 1986 in a losing cause against Larry Bird's Boston Celtics. In 1988, he was traded to the Sacramento Kings with Jim Petersen in a package for Otis Thorpe. In 1990, he was traded to the Dallas Mavericks for Bill Wennington. He spent his final season with the Chicago Bulls after being dealt to them in a three-team trade. He finished his career by winning an NBA championship ring with the Bulls in 1993.

== NBA career statistics ==
Legend
GP	Games played	GS	Games started	MPG	Minutes per game
FG%	Field goal percentage	3P%	3-point field goal percentage	FT%	Free throw percentage
RPG	Rebounds per game	APG	Assists per game	SPG	Steals per game
BPG	Blocks per game	PPG	Points per game	**Bold**	Career high
*	Led the league

=== Regular season ===
Year	Team	GP	GS	MPG	FG%	3P%	FT%	RPG	APG	SPG	BPG	PPG
1983–84	Houston	79	36	26.3	.499	.250	.731	5.7	2.2	.7	.7	10.8
1984–85	Houston	**82***	**82**	36.6	.535	.000	.738	6.6	4.3	**1.1**	**.9**	14.4
1985–86	Houston	**82**	**82**	31.8	.537	.000	.770	6.3	3.6	.6	.7	10.3
1986–87	Houston	81	81	38.7	**.552**	.000	.779	7.1	**5.4**	**1.1**	.7	14.4
1987–88	Houston	81	80	33.2	.481	.000	.785	7.8	3.3	.7	.6	12.4
1988–89	Sacramento	68	65	35.8	.466	.227	.722	7.6	4.3	.8	.5	12.6
1989–90	Sacramento	**82***	**82**	**39.5***	.515	.262	.784	**8.2**	4.6	.7	**.9**	**16.6**
1990–91	Dallas	74	68	34.6	.495	.333	**.803**	7.6	3.5	.9	.7	11.4
1991–92	Dallas	75	48	28.1	.436	.294	.719	6.2	2.9	.6	.4	9.0
1992–93†	Chicago	64	5	15.9	.451	**.400**	.692	2.5	1.3	.2	.2	3.5
Career		768	629	32.4	.503	.260	.761	6.6	3.6	.8	.6	11.7

=== Playoffs ===
Year	Team	GP	GS	MPG	FG%	3P%	FT%	RPG	APG	SPG	BPG	PPG
1985	Houston	5	5	36.2	.559	–	.652	6.0	2.2	**1.2**	.2	10.6
1986	Houston	**20**	**20**	41.8	.535	**.000**	.741	5.9	**6.3**	.9	**1.0**	13.0
1987	Houston	10	10	**43.6**	**.564**	**.000**	**.796**	**8.3**	5.6	.5	.9	**15.7**
1988	Houston	4	4	39.8	.387	**.000**	.667	6.8	2.3	1.0	.8	8.0
1993†	Chicago	7	0	5.6	.167	–	–	1.9	.7	.0	.1	.3
Career		46	39	35.9	.527	.000	.741	5.9	4.5	.7	.7	10.9

== See also ==
- List of National Basketball Association annual minutes leaders
