= Hank McDowell =

American basketball player (born 1959)

Personal information
- Born: November 13, 1959 (age 67) Memphis, Tennessee, U.S.
- Listed height: 6 ft 9 in (2.06 m)
- Listed weight: 215 lb (98 kg)

Career information
- High school: Treadwell (Memphis, Tennessee)
- College: Memphis (1977–1981)
- NBA draft: 1981: 5th round, 102nd overall pick
- Drafted by: Golden State Warriors
- Playing career: 1981–1990
- Position: Power forward / center
- Number: 44, 7, 8, 41

Career history
- 1981–1982: Golden State Warriors
- 1982–1983: Portland Trail Blazers
- 1983–1984: San Diego Clippers
- 1984–1985: Houston Rockets
- 1985–1986: Cincinnati Slammers
- 1986: Houston Rockets
- 1986: Milwaukee Bucks
- 1986–1987: Cincinnati Slammers
- 1987: Rhode Island Gulls
- 1987–1988: Fantoni Udine
- 1988–1989: Valvi Girona
- 1989–1990: Fantoni Udine
- Stats at NBA.com
- Stats at Basketball Reference

Hank Leigh McDowell (born November 13, 1959) is an American former professional basketball player. Born in Memphis, Tennessee, he was a 6-foot-9-inch (206 cm) 210 pounds (95 kg) forward and he played collegiately at Memphis State University (now called the University of Memphis). He played in the National Basketball Association (NBA) from 1981 to 1987. He was originally selected as the tenth pick in the 5th round of the 1981 NBA draft by the Golden State Warriors. During his six-year NBA career he played with the Golden State Warriors, Portland Trail Blazers, San Diego Clippers, Houston Rockets and Milwaukee Bucks.

After his playing career, he launched McDowell Marketing, a Memphis-based business specializing in corporate apparel and promotional products. He has also worked as an analyst on both radio and television broadcasts for the University of Memphis.

McDowell and fellow former NBA player and Memphis State alum Elliot Perry, were announced as the Memphis Grizzlies' radio broadcast team's color commentators during the 2006–07 NBA season.

== Career statistics ==
Legend
GP	Games played	GS	Games started	MPG	Minutes per game
FG%	Field goal percentage	3P%	3-point field goal percentage	FT%	Free throw percentage
RPG	Rebounds per game	APG	Assists per game	SPG	Steals per game
BPG	Blocks per game	PPG	Points per game	**Bold**	Career high

=== NBA ===
==== Regular season ====
Year	Team	GP	GS	MPG	FG%	3P%	FT%	RPG	APG	SPG	BPG	PPG
1981–82	Golden State	30	**1**	**11.2**	.405	.000	.659	**3.3**	**0.7**	0.2	**0.3**	3.2
1982–83	Golden State	14	0	9.3	.448	.000	.778	2.1	0.3	0.1	**0.3**	2.9
1982–83	Portland	42	0	8.9	.464	.000	.767	2.1	0.5	0.1	0.2	2.9
1983–84	San Diego	**57**	0	10.7	.431	.000	.679	2.7	0.6	0.2	0.0	**3.6**
1984–85	Houston	34	0	3.9	.476	.000	.700	0.6	0.3	0.1	0.1	1.4
1985–86	Houston	22	0	9.3	**.571**	.000	.680	2.2	0.3	0.0	0.1	3.0
1986–87	Milwaukee	7	0	10.0	.471	.000	**.857**	2.7	0.3	**0.3**	0.0	3.1
Career		206	1	9.0	.451	.000	.710	2.3	0.5	0.2	0.1	2.9

==== Playoffs ====
Year	Team	GP	GS	MPG	FG%	3P%	FT%	RPG	APG	SPG	BPG	PPG
1982–83	Portland	2	-	2.0	.000	.000	.000	**1.0**	**1.0**	0.0	0.0	0.0
1985–86	Houston	**13**	0	**2.5**	**.286**	.000	**.625**	0.6	0.2	0.0	0.0	**0.7**
Career		15	0	2.5	.250	.000	.625	0.7	0.3	0.0	0.0	0.6

=== College ===
Year	Team	GP	GS	MPG	FG%	3P%	FT%	RPG	APG	SPG	BPG	PPG
1977–78	Memphis	14	-	6.3	**.643**	-	**.727**	1.1	-	-	-	1.9
1978–79	Memphis	**28**	-	22.8	.468	-	.693	5.2	-	-	-	7.6
1979–80	Memphis	27	-	33.3	.451	-	.570	7.5	-	-	-	10.0
1980–81	Memphis	27	-	**34.6**	.496	-	.721	**7.6**	-	-	-	**11.9**
Career		96	-	26.7	.475	-	.668	5.9	-	-	-	8.7
