= 1985–86 Houston Rockets season =

- Conference champions
- Division champions
- Head coach: Bill Fitch
- General manager: Ray Patterson
- Owner: Charlie Thomas
- Arena: The Summit

Results
- Record: 51–31 (.622)
- Place: Division: 1st (Midwest); Conference: 2nd (Western)
- Playoff finish: NBA Finals (lost to Celtics 2–4)
- Stats at Basketball Reference

Local media
- Television: KTXH; Home Sports Entertainment
- Radio: KTRH

The 1985–86 Houston Rockets season saw the Rockets lose the 1986 NBA Finals to the Larry Bird-led Boston Celtics in six games.

In the playoffs, the Rockets swept the Sacramento Kings in three games in the First Round, then defeated the Denver Nuggets in six games in the Semifinals, before dethroning the defending NBA champion Los Angeles Lakers in five games in the conference finals after Ralph Sampson hit a 20-foot jumper as time expired in game five at The Forum to reach the NBA Finals.

In the NBA Finals, the Rockets faced off against the heavily favored Boston Celtics in a rematch of the 1981 NBA Finals, where the Celtics won in six games. Just like in their previous NBA Finals meeting, the Rockets would lose in six games against the Celtics.

== Draft picks ==
Round	Pick	Player	Position	Nationality	College/Club team
1	19	Steve Harris	SG	United States	Tulsa
3	54	Sam Mitchell	SF	United States	Mercer
3	57	Michael Payne		United States	Iowa
4	88	Mike Brooks		United States	Tennessee
6	134	Sam Potter		United States	Oral Roberts

== Roster ==
Houston Rockets roster
Players

Pos.	No.	Player	Height	Weight	DOB	From
G/F	3	Craig Ehlo	6 ft 6 in (1.98 m)	180 lb (82 kg)		Washington State
SG	20	Steve Harris	6 ft 5 in (1.96 m)	195 lb (88 kg)		Tulsa
G	30	Allen Leavell	6 ft 1 in (1.85 m)	170 lb (77 kg)		Oklahoma City
G/F	32	Lewis Lloyd	6 ft 6 in (1.98 m)	205 lb (93 kg)		Drake
PG	5	John Lucas II	6 ft 3 in (1.91 m)	175 lb (79 kg)		Maryland
F	22	Rodney McCray	6 ft 7 in (2.01 m)	220 lb (100 kg)		Louisville
PF	8	Hank McDowell	6 ft 9 in (2.06 m)	215 lb (98 kg)		Memphis
C	34	Akeem Olajuwon	7 ft 0 in (2.13 m)	255 lb (116 kg)		Houston
F/C	43	Jim Petersen	6 ft 10 in (2.08 m)	235 lb (107 kg)		Minnesota
SF	33	Robert Reid	6 ft 8 in (2.03 m)	205 lb (93 kg)		St. Mary's (TX)
F/C	50	Ralph Sampson	7 ft 4 in (2.24 m)	228 lb (103 kg)		Virginia
C	31	Granville Waiters	6 ft 11 in (2.11 m)	225 lb (102 kg)		Ohio State
SG	15	Mitchell Wiggins	6 ft 4 in (1.93 m)	185 lb (84 kg)		South Carolina

Coaches
Head coach
- Bill Fitch

Legend
- (DP) Unsigned draft pick
- (FA) Free agent
- (S) Suspended
- Injured

== Regular season ==
=== Season standings ===
Midwest Division	W	L	PCT	GB	Home	Road	Div
y-Houston Rockets	51	31	.622	–	36–5	15–26	20–10
x-Denver Nuggets	47	35	.573	4	34–7	13–28	15–15
x-Dallas Mavericks	44	38	.537	7	26–15	18–23	16–14
x-Utah Jazz	42	40	.512	9	27–14	15–26	15–15
x-Sacramento Kings	37	45	.451	14	25–16	12–29	15–15
x-San Antonio Spurs	35	47	.427	16	21–20	14–27	9–21

#	Western Conference				
#	Team	W	L	PCT	GB
1	c-Los Angeles Lakers	62	20	.756	–
2	y-Houston Rockets	51	31	.622	11
3	x-Denver Nuggets	47	35	.573	15
4	x-Dallas Mavericks	44	38	.537	18
5	x-Utah Jazz	42	40	.512	20
6	x-Portland Trail Blazers	40	42	.488	22
7	x-Sacramento Kings	37	45	.451	25
8	x-San Antonio Spurs	35	47	.427	27
9	Phoenix Suns	32	50	.390	30
10	Los Angeles Clippers	32	50	.390	30
11	Seattle SuperSonics	31	51	.378	31
12	Golden State Warriors	30	52	.366	32

== Game log ==
=== Regular season ===
1985–86 game log
Total: 51–31 (home: 36–5; road: 15–26)
October: 2–2 (home: 1–0; road: 1–2)

Game	Date	Team	Score	High points	High rebounds	High assists	Location Attendance	Record
1	October 25, 1985	@ Utah	W 112–108				Salt Palace Acord Arena	1–0
2	October 26, 1985	@ L.A. Clippers	L 129–130 (2OT)				Los Angeles Memorial Sports Arena	1–1
3	October 29, 1985	Seattle	W 111–99				The Summit	2–1
4	October 31, 1985	@ Sacramento	L 116–122				ARCO Arena	2–2

November: 11–4 (home: 9–0; road: 2–4)

Game	Date	Team	Score	High points	High rebounds	High assists	Location Attendance	Record
5	November 2, 1985	San Antonio	W 111–98				The Summit	3–2
6	November 5, 1985	Portland	W 127–113				The Summit	4–2
7	November 7, 1985	L.A. Clippers	W 137–115				The Summit	5–2
8	November 9, 1985	@ Dallas	W 115–110				Reunion Arena	6–2
9	November 12, 1985	Denver	W 127–119				The Summit	7–2
10	November 14, 1985	New Jersey	W 112–107				The Summit	8–2
11	November 16, 1985	Dallas	W 122–117				The Summit	9–2
12	November 19, 1985	@ Denver	L 113–127				McNichols Sports Arena	9–3
13	November 20, 1985	Indiana	W 126–97				The Summit	10–3
14	November 22, 1985	@ Seattle	L 103–122				Seattle Center Coliseum	10–4
15	November 24, 1985	@ Portland	L 118–125				Memorial Coliseum	10–5
16	November 26, 1985	Golden State	W 130–108				The Summit	11–5
17	November 27, 1985	@ L.A. Clippers	W 137–130 (OT)				Los Angeles Memorial Sports Arena	12–5
18	November 29, 1985	@ Phoenix	L 110–126				Arizona Veterans Memorial Coliseum	12–6
19	November 30, 1985	Sacramento	W 131–114				The Summit	13–6

December: 7–6 (home: 6–0; road: 1–6)

Game	Date	Team	Score	High points	High rebounds	High assists	Location Attendance	Record
20	December 3, 1985	Phoenix	W 118–112				The Summit	14–6
21	December 6, 1985; 9:30 p.m. CST	@ L.A. Lakers	L 112–120	Sampson (32)	Olajuwon (13)	Lucas; Sampson (9)	The Forum; 17,505	14–7
22	December 7, 1985	Chicago	W 116–104				The Summit	15–7
23	December 10, 1985	Utah	W 134–105				The Summit	16–7
24	December 12, 1985	Dallas	W 123–110				The Summit	17–7
25	December 14, 1985	@ Utah	L 100–114				Salt Palace Acord Arena	17–8
26	December 17, 1985	@ Cleveland	W 98–94				Richfield Coliseum	18–8
27	December 18, 1985	@ Philadelphia	L 108–126				The Spectrum	18–9
28	December 20, 1985	@ New Jersey	L 112–122				Brendan Byrne Arena	18–10
29	December 21, 1985; 6:30 p.m. CST	@ Atlanta	L 122–123	Lloyd (34)	Sampson (15)	Lucas (11)	The Omni; 8,563	18–11
30	December 26, 1985	Utah	W 106–99				The Summit	19–11
31	December 28, 1985	Portland	W 118–108				The Summit	20–11
32	December 30, 1985	@ Denver	L 122–125				McNichols Sports Arena	20–12

January: 12–2 (home: 8–1; road: 4–1)

Game	Date	Team	Score	High points	High rebounds	High assists	Location Attendance	Record
33	January 2, 1986	@ Golden State	W 120–115				Oakland-Alameda County Coliseum Arena	21–12
34	January 4, 1986	Philadelphia	W 115–100				The Summit	22–12
35	January 7, 1986	Golden State	W 124–115				The Summit	23–12
36	January 9, 1986	San Antonio	W 120–110				The Summit	24–12
37	January 11, 1986	Washington	W 87–86				The Summit	25–12
38	January 14, 1986	Utah	L 102–105				The Summit	25–13
39	January 15, 1986	@ San Antonio	W 119–113				HemisFair Arena	26–13
40	January 18, 1986	New York	W 104–95				The Summit	27–13
41	January 19, 1986	@ Dallas	L 96–131				Reunion Arena	27–14
42	January 21, 1986	@ Seattle	W 100–96				Seattle Center Coliseum	28–14
43	January 23, 1986	Sacramento	W 124–107				The Summit	29–14
44	January 25, 1986	Detroit	W 117–112				The Summit	30–14
45	January 28, 1986	Cleveland	W 116–109				The Summit	31–14
46	January 30, 1986	@ Sacramento	W 111–109				ARCO Arena	32–14

February: 6–7 (home: 4–2; road: 2–5)

Game	Date	Team	Score	High points	High rebounds	High assists	Location Attendance	Record
47	February 1, 1986	@ Chicago	L 122–132				Chicago Stadium	32–15
48	February 3, 1986	Denver	W 104–102				The Summit	33–15
49	February 6, 1986; 7:30 p.m. CST	L.A. Lakers	L 95–117	Olajuwon (18)	Olajuwon (14)	Lucas (8)	The Summit; 16,016	33–16
All-Star Break
50	February 11, 1986; 7:30 p.m. CST	Atlanta	W 113–100	Sampson (27)	McCray (14)	Lucas (16)	The Summit; 16,016	34–16
51	February 13, 1986	@ San Antonio	L 115–119				HemisFair Arena	34–17
52	February 15, 1986	@ L.A. Clippers	L 101–108				Los Angeles Memorial Sports Arena	34–18
53	February 17, 1986	@ Golden State	W 116–110				Oakland-Alameda County Coliseum Arena	35–18
54	February 18, 1986	@ Sacramento	L 105–115				ARCO Arena	35–19
55	February 20, 1986; 7:30 p.m. CST	Milwaukee	L 113–120	Sampson (24)	Petersen (9)	Lucas (7)	The Summit; 14,448	35–20
56	February 21, 1986	@ Dallas	W 111–104				Reunion Arena	36–20
57	February 24, 1986	Dallas	W 110–105				The Summit	37–20
58	February 25, 1986	@ Utah	L 97–100				Salt Palace Acord Arena	37–21
59	February 27, 1986	Denver	W 117–111				The Summit	38–21

March: 8–8 (home: 5–1; road: 3–7)

Game	Date	Team	Score	High points	High rebounds	High assists	Location Attendance	Record
60	March 1, 1986	@ Portland	L 112–117				Memorial Coliseum	38–22
61	March 3, 1986	@ Seattle	L 105–118				Seattle Center Coliseum	38–23
62	March 4, 1986	@ Denver	L 115–128				McNichols Sports Arena	38–24
63	March 6, 1986	Sacramento	W 116–105				The Summit	39–24
64	March 8, 1986	San Antonio	W 126–117				The Summit	40–24
65	March 11, 1986; 7:30 p.m. CST	Boston	L 104–116	Sampson (23)	Petersen; Sampson (12)	Lewis Lloyd, Lucas (9)	The Summit; 16,016	40–25
66	March 13, 1986	Portland	W 126–118				The Summit	41–25
67	March 15, 1986	L.A. Clippers	W 148–116				The Summit	42–25
68	March 16, 1986; 9:30 p.m. CST	@ L.A. Lakers	L 111–116	Sampson (27)	Sampson (16)	McCray (10)	The Forum; 17,505	42–26
69	March 18, 1986	Phoenix	W 112–109				The Summit	43–26
70	March 20, 1986; 7:30 p.m. CST	@ Milwaukee	L 106–116	Sampson (20)	Sampson (14)	Sampson (6)	MECCA Arena; 11,052	43–27
71	March 22, 1986	@ New York	W 114–99				Madison Square Garden	44–27
72	March 24, 1986; 7:00 p.m. CST	@ Boston	L 107–114	Olajuwon (29)	Olajuwon (14)	Leavell (6)	Boston Garden; 14,890	44–28
73	March 26, 1986	@ Indiana	W 110–101				Market Square Arena	45–28
74	March 28, 1986	@ Detroit	L 107–116				Pontiac Silverdome	45–29
75	March 29, 1986	@ Washington	W 114–109				Capital Centre	46–29

April: 5–2 (home: 3–1; road: 2–1)

Game	Date	Team	Score	High points	High rebounds	High assists	Location Attendance	Record
76	April 1, 1986	Golden State	W 125–121				The Summit	47–29
77	April 3, 1986	@ San Antonio	W 136–110				HemisFair Arena	48–29
78	April 4, 1986	@ Phoenix	W 112–89				Arizona Veterans Memorial Coliseum	49–29
79	April 6, 1986; 2:30 p.m. CST	L.A. Lakers	W 109–103	Olajuwon (25)	Sampson (17)	Sampson (9)	The Summit; 16,016	50–29
80	April 8, 1986	Seattle	W 109–95				The Summit	51–29
81	April 10, 1986; 9:30 p.m. CST	@ L.A. Lakers	L 113–117	Olajuwon (34)	McCray, Olajuwon (8)	McCray (10)	The Forum; 17,505	51–30
82	April 12, 1986	Phoenix	L 92–110				The Summit	51–31

1985–86 schedule

== Playoffs ==
1986 playoff game log
First Round: 3–0 (home: 2–0; road: 1–0)

Game	Date	Team	Score	High points	High rebounds	High assists	Location Attendance	Series
1	April 17, 1986	Sacramento	W 107–87	Akeem Olajuwon (29)	Akeem Olajuwon (15)	Rodney McCray (7)	The Summit; 15,101	1–0
2	April 19, 1986	Sacramento	W 111–103	Robert Reid (29)	Ralph Sampson (8)	Reid, Sampson (6)	The Summit; 16,016	2–0
3	April 22, 1986	@ Sacramento	W 113–98	Lloyd, Sampson (25)	Akeem Olajuwon (13)	Lloyd, McCray (7)	ARCO Arena I 10,333	3–0

Conference Semifinals: 4–2 (home: 3–0; road: 1–2)

Game	Date	Team	Score	High points	High rebounds	High assists	Location Attendance	Series
1	April 26, 1986	Denver	W 126–119	Akeem Olajuwon (38)	Akeem Olajuwon (16)	Robert Reid (9)	The Summit; 15,448	1–0
2	April 29, 1986	Denver	W 119–101	Ralph Sampson (27)	Akeem Olajuwon (14)	Rodney McCray (10)	The Summit; 16,016	2–0
3	May 2, 1986	@ Denver	L 115–116	Akeem Olajuwon (31)	Akeem Olajuwon (11)	McCray, Lloyd (8)	McNichols Sports Arena; 17,022	2–1
4	May 4, 1986	@ Denver	L 111–114 (OT)	Ralph Sampson (28)	Ralph Sampson (13)	Robert Reid (7)	McNichols Sports Arena; 14,152	2–2
5	May 6, 1986	Denver	W 131–103	Akeem Olajuwon (36)	Akeem Olajuwon (19)	Robert Reid (12)	The Summit; 16,016	3–2
6	May 8, 1986	@ Denver	W 126–122 (2OT)	Akeem Olajuwon (28)	Ralph Sampson (18)	Rodney McCray (7)	McNichols Sports Arena; 17,022	4–2

Western Conference Finals: 4–1 (home: 2–0; road: 2–1)

Game	Date	Team	Score	High points	High rebounds	High assists	Location Attendance	Series
1	May 10, 1986; 2:30 p.m. CDT	@ L.A. Lakers	L 107–119	Olajuwon (28)	Olajuwon (16)	Reid (8)	The Forum; 17,505	0–1
2	May 13, 1986; 9:30 p.m. CDT	@ L.A. Lakers	W 112–102	Lloyd, Sampson (24)	Sampson (16)	McCray (11)	The Forum; 17,505	1–1
3	May 16, 1986; 8:30 p.m. CDT	L.A. Lakers	W 117–109	Olajuwon (40)	Olajuwon (12)	Reid (12)	The Summit; 16,016	2–1
4	May 18, 1986; 2:30 p.m. CDT	L.A. Lakers	W 105–95	Olajuwon (35)	Petersen (13)	McCray (6)	The Summit; 16,016	3–1
5	May 21, 1986; 10:30 p.m. CDT	@ L.A. Lakers	W 114–112	Olajuwon (30)	Olajuwon (7)	McCray (11)	The Forum; 17,505	4–1

NBA Finals: 2–4 (home: 2–1; road: 0–3)

Game	Date	Team	Score	High points	High rebounds	High assists	Location Attendance	Series
1	May 26, 1986; 2:00 p.m. CDT	@ Boston	L 100–112	Olajuwon (33)	Olajuwon (12)	Reid (8)	Boston Garden; 14,890	0–1
2	May 29, 1986; 8:00 p.m. CDT	@ Boston	L 95–117	Olajuwon (21)	Olajuwon (10)	McCray, Reid (5)	Boston Garden; 14,890	0–2
3	June 1, 1986; 2:30 p.m. CDT	Boston	W 106–104	Sampson (24)	Sampson (22)	Reid (9)	The Summit; 16,016	1–2
4	June 3, 1986; 8:00 p.m. CDT	Boston	L 103–106	Sampson (25)	Olajuwon (14)	Sampson (9)	The Summit; 16,016	1–3
5	June 5, 1986; 8:00 p.m. CDT	Boston	W 111–96	Olajuwon (32)	Olajuwon (14)	Reid (17)	The Summit; 16,016	2–3
6	June 8, 1986; 12 Noon CDT	@ Boston	L 97–114	Olajuwon (21)	Olajuwon (10)	McCray, Reid (5)	Boston Garden; 14,890	2–4

1986 schedule

== Player statistics ==
Legend
GP	Games played	GS	Games started	MPG	Minutes per game
FG%	Field-goal percentage	3P%	3-point field-goal percentage	FT%	Free-throw percentage
RPG	Rebounds per game	APG	Assists per game	SPG	Steals per game
BPG	Blocks per game	PPG	Points per game

=== Season ===
Player	GP	GS	MPG	FG%	3FG%	FT%	RPG	APG	SPG	BPG	PPG
Craig Ehlo	36	0	5.5	.429	.333	.793	1.3	.8	.3	.1	2.7
Steve Harris	57	0	8.5	.442	.200	.926	1.0	.9	.4	.1	4.5
Allen Leavell	74	12	16.1	.463	.358	.854	.9	3.2	.8	.1	7.9
Lewis Lloyd	82	82	29.8	.529	.200	.843	4.0	3.7	1.2	.3	16.9
John Lucas Jr.	65	65	32.6	.446	.308	.775	2.2	8.8	1.2	.1	15.5
Rodney McCray	82	82	31.8	.537	.000	.770	6.3	3.6	.6	.7	10.3
Hank McDowell	22	0	9.3	.571	.000	.680	2.2	.3	.0	.1	3.0
Akeem Olajuwon	68	68	36.3	.526	.000	.645	11.5	2.0	2.0	3.4	23.5
Jim Petersen	82	20	20.3	.477	.000	.706	4.8	1.0	.5	.7	6.2
Robert Reid	82	5	26.3	.464	.182	.757	3.7	2.7	1.1	.2	12.0
Ralph Sampson	79	76	36.3	.488	.133	.461	11.1	3.6	1.3	1.6	18.9
Granville Waiters	43	0	3.6	.333	.000	.167	.7	.2	.1	.2	.6
Mitchell Wiggins	78	0	15.4	.454	.083	.729	2.0	1.3	.8	.1	6.8

=== Playoffs ===
Player	GP	GS	MPG	FG%	3FG%	FT%	RPG	APG	SPG	BPG	PPG

== Awards and records ==
=== Awards ===
- Akeem Olajuwon, All-NBA Second Team

== See also ==
- 1985–86 NBA season
