= Lewis Lloyd =

American basketball player (1959–2019)

Personal information
- Born: February 22, 1959 Philadelphia, Pennsylvania, U. S.
- Died: July 5, 2019 (aged 60) Philadelphia, Pennsylvania, U. S.
- Listed height: 6 ft 6 in (1.98 m)
- Listed weight: 205 lb (93 kg)

Career information
- High school: Overbrook (Philadelphia, Pennsylvania)
- College: New Mexico Military Institute (1977–1979); Drake (1979–1981)
- NBA draft: 1981: 4th round, 76th overall pick
- Drafted by: Golden State Warriors
- Playing career: 1981–1990
- Position: Shooting guard / small forward
- Number: 32, 30

Career history
- 1981–1983: Golden State Warriors
- 1983–1987: Houston Rockets
- 1988: Philadelphia Aces
- 1988–1989: Cedar Rapids Silver Bullets
- 1989: Houston Rockets
- 1990: Philadelphia 76ers
- 1990: Houston Rockets
- 1990: Philadelphia Aces
- 1990-1991: Sarsi Sizzlers

Career highlights
- 2× Third-team All-American – AP, UPI (1980, 1981); 2× MVC Player of the Year (1980, 1981); 2× First-team All-MVC (1980, 1981); No. 30 retired by Drake Bulldogs

Career NBA statistics
- Points: 5,130 (13.2 ppg)
- Rebounds: 1,192 (3.1 rpg)
- Assists: 1,138 (2.9 apg)
- Stats at NBA.com
- Stats at Basketball Reference

Lewis Kevin Lloyd (February 22, 1959 – July 5, 2019) was an American basketball player. A 6'6" swingman from Drake University, he played most of his professional career for the National Basketball Association's Houston Rockets.

== Early life ==
Lloyd played his high school basketball at Overbrook High School in Philadelphia, the same as Wilt Chamberlain, where he earned the nickname "Black Magic."

== College career ==
He graduated from Drake University in Des Moines, Iowa after starting his college career at the junior college, New Mexico Military Institute in Roswell. Lloyd averaged 30.2 points and 15 rebounds per game in his junior year and 26.3 per game as a Senior. He was a two-time winner of the Missouri Valley Conference Player of the Year while at Drake.

== Professional career ==
=== Golden State Warriors (1981-1983) ===
Lloyd was selected in the fourth round of the 1981 NBA draft by the Golden State Warriors. He played seven seasons in the NBA.

=== Houston Rockets (1983-1987) ===
After two seasons in Oakland, he moved to the Houston Rockets, where he would play three full seasons, appearing in 246 out of 246 possible regular season games while always scoring in double digits. In late 1986, however, he tested positive for cocaine alongside teammate Mitchell Wiggins, incurring a 2 1/2-year suspension from the league.

=== Cedar Rapids Silver Bullets (1988-1989) ===
While suspended from the NBA, Lloyd played for the Cedar Rapids Silver Bullets in the Continental Basketball Association during the 1988–89 season. He averaged 18.8 points and 6.6 rebounds over 18 games.

=== Return to Houston and Philadelphia 76ers (1989-1990) ===
Soon after his reinstatement in September 1989, Lloyd was released by Houston, retiring at the end of the season after two games with the Philadelphia 76ers, holding averages of 13 points, three rebounds and three assists, in 388 games. He also appeared in 20 post-season contests in 1986 as the Rockets reached the NBA Finals, losing 4–2 to the Boston Celtics.

== Personal life ==
After retiring from basketball in the 2000s, Lloyd conducted youth basketball clinics, and coached at basketball camps in Philadelphia, Des Moines, and Wichita.

Lloyd died on July 5, 2019.

== Career statistics ==
Legend
GP	Games played	GS	Games started	MPG	Minutes per game
FG%	Field goal percentage	3P%	3-point field goal percentage	FT%	Free throw percentage
RPG	Rebounds per game	APG	Assists per game	SPG	Steals per game
BPG	Blocks per game	PPG	Points per game	**Bold**	Career high
*	Led the league

=== NBA ===
==== Regular season ====
Year	Team	GP	GS	MPG	FG%	3P%	FT%	RPG	APG	SPG	BPG	PPG
1981–82	Golden State	16	0	5.9	.556	–	.636	1.0	.4	.3	.1	3.6
1982–83	Golden State	73	24	18.5	.518	**.250**	.719	3.6	1.8	.8	.1	9.4
1983–84	Houston	**82***	**82***	**31.4**	.516	.239	.789	3.6	**3.9**	**1.2**	**.5**	**17.8**
1984–85	Houston	**82***	58	26.0	.526	**.250**	.732	2.8	3.4	.9	.3	13.1
1985–86	Houston	**82**	**82***	29.8	.529	.200	**.843**	**4.0**	3.7	**1.2**	.3	16.9
1986–87	Houston	32	14	21.5	.532	.143	.756	1.5	2.8	.6	.2	12.4
1989–90	Philadelphia	2	0	5.0	.500	–	–	.0	.0	.0	.0	1.0
1989–90	Phoenix	19	0	5.9	**.569**	–	.563	.9	.6	.2	.0	3.5
Career		388	260	24.2	.524	.213	.771	3.1	2.9	.9	.3	13.2

==== Playoffs ====
Year	Team	GP	GS	MPG	FG%	3P%	FT%	RPG	APG	SPG	BPG	PPG
1985	Houston	5	5	**34.8**	**.494**	–	.714	**5.8**	**5.0**	**1.4**	**1.6**	**17.2**
1986	Houston	**20**	**20**	29.5	.481	**.400**	**.810**	3.3	4.3	.8	.3	14.1
Career		25	25	30.5	.484	.400	.792	3.8	4.4	.9	.6	14.7

== See also ==
- List of people banned or suspended by the NBA
