= Sam Williams (basketball, born 1959) =

American basketball player

Personal information
- Born: March 7, 1959 (age 67) Los Angeles, California, U.S.
- Listed height: 6 ft 8 in (2.03 m)
- Listed weight: 210 lb (95 kg)

Career information
- High school: Westchester (Los Angeles, California)
- College: Pasadena CC (1977–1978); Arizona State (1978–1981)
- NBA draft: 1981: 2nd round, 33rd overall pick
- Drafted by: Golden State Warriors
- Playing career: 1981–1993
- Position: Power forward
- Number: 33

Career history
- 1981–1983: Golden State Warriors
- 1983–1985: Philadelphia 76ers
- 1985–1986: Virtus Bologna
- 1987–1988: Basket Napoli
- 1988–1991: BCM Gravelines
- 1991–1992: Bakersfield Jammers
- 1992–1993: Fenerbahçe

Career highlights
- First-team All-Pac-10 (1981)
- Stats at NBA.com
- Stats at Basketball Reference

Samuel Keith Williams (born March 7, 1959), nicknamed "Slam", is an American former professional basketball player in the National Basketball Association (NBA). He played four seasons in the NBA from 1981 through 1985 with the Golden State Warriors and the Philadelphia 76ers. Williams played college basketball for the Arizona State Sun Devils, where he was an All-Pac-10 first team selection in 1981. He was drafted in the 1981 NBA draft in the second round with the 33rd overall pick by the Golden State Warriors. Williams also played in the Continental Basketball Association in 1991–92 for the Bakersfield Jammers.

== Career statistics ==
Legend
| GP | Games played | GS | Games started | MPG | Minutes per game |
| FG% | Field goal percentage | 3P% | 3-point field goal percentage | FT% | Free throw percentage |
| RPG | Rebounds per game | APG | Assists per game | SPG | Steals per game |
| BPG | Blocks per game | PPG | Points per game | **Bold** | Career high |

=== NBA ===
==== Regular season ====
| Year | Team | GP | GS | MPG | FG% | 3P% | FT% | RPG | APG | SPG | BPG | PPG |
|---|---|---|---|---|---|---|---|---|---|---|---|---|
| 1981–82 | Golden State | 59 | 22 | 18.2 | **.556** | – | .551 | **5.2** | .6 | .8 | 1.3 | 6.1 |
| 1982–83 | Golden State | **75** | **28** | **20.4** | .526 | .000 | .719 | **5.2** | .6 | **.9** | 1.2 | **8.4** |
| 1983–84 | Golden State | 7 | 0 | 8.4 | .423 | – | **.857** | 1.9 | .3 | **.9** | .4 | 4.0 |
| 1983–84 | Philadelphia | 70 | 12 | 19.6 | .477 | .000 | .647 | 4.7 | **.9** | **.9** | **1.5** | 6.7 |
| 1984–85 | Philadelphia | 46 | 8 | 10.6 | .392 | .000 | .596 | 2.3 | .2 | .6 | .6 | 3.1 |
| Career | | 257 | 70 | 17.6 | .500 | .000 | .653 | 4.5 | .6 | .8 | 1.2 | 6.3 |

==== Playoffs ====
| Year | Team | GP | GS | MPG | FG% | 3P% | FT% | RPG | APG | SPG | BPG | PPG |
|---|---|---|---|---|---|---|---|---|---|---|---|---|
| 1984 | Philadelphia | 4 | | **13.8** | **.250** | – | **.500** | 1.5 | **.8** | **.5** | **1.5** | **1.3** |
| 1985 | Philadelphia | **5** | 0 | 5.2 | .167 | – | .300 | **2.4** | .0 | .0 | .0 | 1.0 |
| Career | | 9 | 0 | 9.0 | .214 | – | .333 | 2.0 | .3 | .2 | .7 | 1.1 |
