= Steve Harris (basketball) =

American basketball player (1963–2016)

Personal information
- Born: October 15, 1963 Kansas City, Missouri, U.S.
- Died: February 22, 2016 (aged 52) Broken Arrow, Oklahoma, U.S.
- Listed height: 6 ft 5 in (1.96 m)
- Listed weight: 195 lb (88 kg)

Career information
- High school: Blue Springs (Blue Springs, Missouri)
- College: Tulsa (1981–1985)
- NBA draft: 1985: 1st round, 19th overall pick
- Drafted by: Houston Rockets
- Playing career: 1985–1991
- Position: Shooting guard
- Number: 20, 11, 35

Career history
- 1985–1987: Houston Rockets
- 1987–1988: Golden State Warriors
- 1988–1989: Detroit Pistons
- 1989–1990: Columbus Horizon
- 1990: Los Angeles Clippers
- 1990–1991: Columbus Horizon

Career highlights
- Second-team All-American – UPI (1985); 3× First-team All-MVC (1983–1985); No. 20 retired by Tulsa Golden Hurricane
- Stats at NBA.com
- Stats at Basketball Reference

Steven Dwayne Harris (October 15, 1963 – February 22, 2016) was an American professional basketball player who was selected by the Houston Rockets in the first round (19th pick overall) of the 1985 NBA draft. A 6'5" shooting guard from the University of Tulsa, Harris played in five NBA seasons from 1985 to 1990.

He played a career total of 207 NBA games with the Rockets, Golden State Warriors, Detroit Pistons and Los Angeles Clippers, scoring 1,440 points. His best year as a professional came during the 1987–88 season, when he split time with the Rockets and Warriors, appearing in 58 games and averaging 9.2 ppg.

Harris died of colon cancer on February 22, 2016, at the age of 52.

== Career statistics ==
Legend
GP	Games played	GS	Games started	MPG	Minutes per game
FG%	Field goal percentage	3P%	3-point field goal percentage	FT%	Free throw percentage
RPG	Rebounds per game	APG	Assists per game	SPG	Steals per game
BPG	Blocks per game	PPG	Points per game	**Bold**	Career high

=== NBA ===
==== Regular season ====
Year	Team	GP	GS	MPG	FG%	3P%	FT%	RPG	APG	SPG	BPG	PPG
1985–86	Houston	57	0	8.5	.442	**.200**	.926	1.0	.9	.4	.1	4.5
1986–87	Houston	**74**	3	15.9	.419	.000	.854	2.3	1.4	.5	**.2**	8.3
1987–88	Houston	14	10	14.2	.395	.000	.938	1.5	1.2	.6	.1	5.2
1987–88	Golden State	44	**16**	**20.1**	**.471**	.000	.763	**2.4**	**1.6**	**1.0**	.1	**10.3**
1988–89	Detroit	3	0	2.3	.250	–	**1.000**	.7	.0	.3	.0	1.3
1989–90	L.A. Clippers	15	0	6.2	.350	–	.750	.7	.1	.5	.1	2.1
Career		207	29	13.7	.434	.050	.842	1.8	1.1	.6	.1	7.0

==== Playoffs ====
Year	Team	GP	GS	MPG	FG%	3P%	FT%	RPG	APG	SPG	BPG	PPG
1986	Houston	**15**	0	5.5	**.483**	–	.400	.7	.1	**.3**	**.2**	2.0
1987	Houston	9	0	**10.1**	.372	.000	**.833**	**.8**	**.6**	**.3**	.0	**4.1**
Career		24	0	7.3	.417	.000	.636	.7	.3	.3	.1	2.8
