= Mitchell Wiggins =

American basketball player (1959–2024)

Personal information
- Born: September 28, 1959 Kinston, North Carolina, U.S.
- Died: September 9, 2024 (aged 64)
- Listed height: 6 ft 4 in (1.93 m)
- Listed weight: 185 lb (84 kg)

Career information
- High school: North Lenoir (LaGrange, North Carolina)
- College: Truett-McConnell CC (1978–1979); Clemson (1979–1980); Florida State (1981–1983)
- NBA draft: 1983: 1st round, 23rd overall pick
- Drafted by: Indiana Pacers
- Playing career: 1983–2003
- Position: Shooting guard
- Number: 15, 10

Career history
- 1983–1984: Chicago Bulls
- 1984–1987: Houston Rockets
- 1987: Tampa Bay Stars
- 1987–1988: Mississippi Jets
- 1987–1988: Quad City Thunder
- 1988: Jacksonville Hooters
- 1989–1990: Houston Rockets
- 1991–1992: Philadelphia 76ers
- 1992: Fort Wayne Fury
- 1992–1993: Oklahoma City Cavalry
- 1993: Aurora Desio
- 1993–1994: Milon
- 1994: Tondeña 65 Rhummasters
- 1994–1996: Sporting
- 1996–1997: Panionios
- 1997–1998: Sporting
- 1998–1999: Limoges CSP
- 2002: Hickory Nutz
- 2002–2003: Spearfish Black Hills Heat

Career highlights
- 2× Greek League Top Scorer (1994, 1996); 3× Greek League All-Star (1994 I, 1994 II, 1996 I); 2× First-team All-Metro Conference (1982, 1983); USBL All-Star (1987)

Career statistics
- Stats at NBA.com
- Stats at Basketball Reference
Medals
Men's basketball
Representing United States
FIBA World Cup
Silver medal – second place	1982 Colombia

Mitchell Lee Wiggins (September 28, 1959 – September 9, 2024) was an American professional basketball player who was a shooting guard in the National Basketball Association (NBA).

== College career ==
He played collegiately at Truett-McConnell College, Clemson University and Florida State University. Wiggins averaged 23 points and nine rebounds per game during his two seasons at Florida State.

== Professional career ==
=== Chicago Bulls (1983–1984) ===
Wiggins was selected by the Indiana Pacers as the 23rd overall pick of the 1983 NBA draft and traded to the Chicago Bulls for Sidney Lowe and a 2nd-round pick. In his rookie year, Wiggins played in all 82 regular season games while averaging twelve points, four rebounds and two assists per game.

=== Houston Rockets (1984–1987, 1989–1990) ===
In the 1984 off-season, the Bulls traded Wiggins with draft picks to the Houston Rockets for Caldwell Jones. He mostly came off the bench behind John Lucas and Lewis Lloyd. In 1987, Lloyd and Wiggins tested positive for cocaine, incurring a two-and-a-half-year suspension from the league.

Both Wiggins and Lloyd were reinstated for the 1989–90 season. Wiggins appeared in 66 games and averaged 15.5 points per game but was criticized by his coach, Don Chaney, for his defense. His playing time decreased after Houston traded for Vernon Maxwell.

=== Philadelphia 76ers (1991–1992) ===
After Wiggins became a free agent, no team expressed an interest in Wiggins outside the Philadelphia 76ers. They had intended to sign Wiggins to their roster in November 1990, but backed out when he refused to take a complete physical including a drug test. Wiggins did not play the 1990–91 season, but the 76ers kept in touch with him and signed him to a one-year contract the following year.

The 1991–92 season was Wiggins' last in the NBA. He scored 3,877 points in his NBA career.

=== Greek League, CSP Limoges, Tondeña 65 Rhummasters, and minor leagues (1993–2003) ===
Wiggins then went to Europe and had a notable career in the Greek League playing for Milon Nea Smyrni, Sporting Athens, and Panionios Nea Smyrni. He also appeared for CSP Limoges in the French League, the Tondeña 65 Rhummasters in the Philippine Basketball Association, and several minor league teams in the United States.

== National team career ==
Wiggins played for the US national basketball team at the 1982 FIBA World Championship, winning the silver medal.

== Coaching career ==
In the 2000s Wiggins tried coaching in the lower leagues.

== Career statistics ==
Legend
GP	Games played	GS	Games started	MPG	Minutes per game
FG%	Field goal percentage	3P%	3-point field goal percentage	FT%	Free throw percentage
RPG	Rebounds per game	APG	Assists per game	SPG	Steals per game
BPG	Blocks per game	PPG	Points per game	**Bold**	Career high
*	Led the league

=== NBA ===
==== Regular season ====
Year	Team	GP	GS	MPG	FG%	3P%	FT%	RPG	APG	SPG	BPG	PPG
1983–84	Chicago	**82***	40	25.9	.448	.241	.742	4.0	2.3	1.3	.1	12.4
1984–85	Houston	**82***	24	19.2	.484	**.261**	.733	2.9	1.5	1.0	**.2**	9.0
1985–86	Houston	78	0	15.4	.454	.083	.729	2.0	1.3	.8	.1	6.8
1986–87	Houston	32	19	24.6	.437	.000	.754	4.2	**2.4**	**1.4**	.1	11.1
1989–90	Houston	66	**52**	**28.1**	**.488**	.000	**.810**	**4.3**	1.6	1.3	.0	**15.5**
1991–92	Philadelphia	49	0	11.6	.384	.000	.686	1.9	.4	.4	.0	4.3
Career		389	135	20.8	.460	.192	.755	3.2	1.6	1.0	.1	10.0

==== Playoffs ====
Year	Team	GP	GS	MPG	FG%	3P%	FT%	RPG	APG	SPG	BPG	PPG
1985	Houston	5	0	9.0	**.500**	–	–	.8	.2	**.8**	.0	3.6
1986	Houston	**20***	0	**22.2**	.497	.000	**.750**	**3.8**	**1.6**	.7	**.2**	**10.0**
1990	Houston	4	0	12.8	.467	–	.667	3.3	.5	.3	.0	4.0
Career		29	0	18.6	.495	.000	.742	3.2	1.2	.7	.1	8.0

== Personal life ==
Wiggins' wife, Marita Payne-Wiggins, competed for Canada in track and field at the 1984 Summer Olympics, winning two silver medals. Since 2002, their family has resided in Vaughan, Ontario, Canada.

Wiggins' youngest son, Andrew, was selected first overall in the 2014 NBA draft by the Cleveland Cavaliers. Wiggins' oldest son, Mitchell Jr., played for Southeastern University and his middle son Nicholas Wiggins plays professionally. Both Mitchell Jr. and Nick were drafted by the Harlem Globetrotters in 2014. Wiggins also has three daughters: Stephanie, Angelica, and Taya.

Wiggins died on September 9, 2024, at the age of 64.

== See also ==
- List of people banned or suspended by the NBA
- List of second-generation National Basketball Association players
