= 1986–87 NBA season =

41st NBA season

- League: National Basketball Association
- Sport: Basketball
- Duration: October 31, 1986 – April 19, 1987; April 23 – May 30, 1987 (Playoffs); June 2–14, 1987 (Finals)
- Teams: 23
- TV partner(s): CBS, TBS

Draft
- Top draft pick: Brad Daugherty
- Picked by: Cleveland Cavaliers

Regular season
- Top seed: Los Angeles Lakers
- Season MVP: Magic Johnson (L.A. Lakers)
- Top scorer: Michael Jordan (Chicago)

Playoffs
- Eastern champions: Boston Celtics
- Eastern runners-up: Detroit Pistons
- Western champions: Los Angeles Lakers
- Western runners-up: Seattle SuperSonics

Finals
- Champions: Los Angeles Lakers
- Runners-up: Boston Celtics
- Finals MVP: Magic Johnson (L.A. Lakers)

NBA seasons
- ← 1985–86 1987–88 →

The 1986–87 NBA season was the 41st season of the National Basketball Association. The season ended with the Los Angeles Lakers winning their fourth championship of the decade, beating the Boston Celtics 4 games to 2 in the NBA Finals.

== Notable occurrences ==
Coaching changes
Offseason
Team	1985–86 coach	1986–87 coach
San Antonio Spurs	Cotton Fitzsimmons	Bob Weiss
Portland Trail Blazers	Jack Ramsay	Mike Schuler
Chicago Bulls	Stan Albeck	Doug Collins
Cleveland Cavaliers	Gene Littles	Lenny Wilkens
Indiana Pacers	George Irvine	Jack Ramsay
Golden State Warriors	Johnny Bach	George Karl
In-season
Team	Outgoing coach	Incoming coach
New York Knicks	Hubie Brown	Bob Hill
Phoenix Suns	John MacLeod	Dick Van Arsdale
Sacramento Kings	Phil Johnson	Jerry Reynolds

- Boston Celtics' top draft pick Len Bias died of a cocaine overdose barely two days after the draft. In the wake of Micheal Ray Richardson's lifetime suspension, several NBA players were suspended for violations of the anti-drug policy; among them Houston Rockets forward Lewis Lloyd and guard Mitchell Wiggins.
- On April 17, three Phoenix Suns players (James Edwards, Jay Humphries, and Grant Gondrezick) and two former players (Gar Heard and Mike Bratz) were indicted for cocaine trafficking at a popular Phoenix nightclub. Several other players were also involved in the scandal.
- When Mychal Thompson joined the Lakers this season alongside the likes of Kareem Abdul-Jabbar, Magic Johnson, and James Worthy, the Lakers became the first team to ever have four different #1 draft picks join the same team.
- The 1987 NBA All-Star Game was played at the Kingdome in Seattle, with the West defeating the East 154–149 in overtime. To the delight of the Seattle crowd, the SuperSonics' Tom Chambers won the game's MVP award. Michael Jordan won his first Slam Dunk Contest.
- This was the final NBA season for Philadelphia's Julius Erving who announced his retirement that year. NBA arenas paid tribute to Erving's retirement by staging special events for him. The New Jersey Nets, in particular, retired Erving's No. 32 jersey for his contributions with the franchise. Thus Erving became the only player to have his number retired by a team while still an active player.
- Michael Jordan joined Wilt Chamberlain as only the second player in NBA history to score 3000 points in a season. With a 37.1 ppg, Jordan also began a seven-year reign as the NBA's scoring champion, tied with Chamberlain for the league record.
- This was the last season the Lakers and Celtics matched up in the NBA Finals until 2008.
- The 1986–87 season was also known as the "Golden Era" of the NBA. The 1987 NBA season featured up to 24 Hall of Fame players such as Magic Johnson, Kareem Abdul-Jabbar, James Worthy, Larry Bird, Michael Jordan, Kevin McHale, Robert Parish, Bill Walton, Moses Malone, Julius Erving, Isiah Thomas, Dominique Wilkins, Charles Barkley, Akeem Olajuwon, Clyde Drexler, Karl Malone, John Stockton, Alex English, Patrick Ewing, Artis Gilmore, Adrian Dantley, Joe Dumars, Dennis Johnson and Dennis Rodman.
- Despite finishing with a sub-.500 record, the Seattle SuperSonics were able to upset the Dallas Mavericks and Houston Rockets before bowing down to the Los Angeles Lakers in the Western Conference Finals in a four-game sweep.
- In a game on February 4, 1987, the Los Angeles Lakers set two NBA records by jumping out to a 29–0 lead over the Sacramento Kings and leading by 36 points (40–4) at the end of the first quarter. The Lakers went on to win, 128–92.
- The NBA logo was prominently displayed on the uniforms for the first time (usually on the left side of the jersey; it was moved to the top rear in 2014), becoming the first sports league in North America to do so. The practice of placing the league logo on the jerseys eventually spreads to the NFL, NHL and MLB.
- Fernando Martín became the first Spanish player to play in the NBA when he debuted for the Portland Trail Blazers in December 1986. He would pave the way for future Spanish players in the league, including six-time NBA All-Star Pau Gasol.
- Los Angeles Clippers becoming the second team in NBA history to lose 70 or more games joining the 1972–73 76ers, the latter was (1992–93 Mavericks, 1997–98 Nuggets, 2009–10 Nets (including losing 18 straight games to start the season), and the 2015–16 76ers (including a record–tying 26–game losing streak also including losing 18 straight games to start the season).
- Michael Jordan becomes the first player in NBA history to accumulate over 200 steals with over 100 blocks in a season.
- Larry Bird becomes the first player in NBA history to enter the 50–40–90 club.

== 1986–87 NBA changes ==
- The Milwaukee Bucks changed their uniforms removing the red areas on the side panels to their jerseys and shorts.

== Final standings ==
=== By division ===
Atlantic Division	W	L	PCT	GB	Home	Road	Div
y-Boston Celtics	59	23	.720	–	39–2	20–21	15–9
x-Philadelphia 76ers	45	37	.549	14	28–13	17–24	12–12
x-Washington Bullets	42	40	.512	17	27–14	15–26	13–11
New Jersey Nets	24	58	.293	35	19–22	5–36	12–12
New York Knicks	24	58	.293	35	18–23	6–35	8–16

Central Division	W	L	PCT	GB	Home	Road	Div
y-Atlanta Hawks	57	25	.695	–	35–6	22–19	17–13
x-Detroit Pistons	52	30	.634	5	32–9	20–21	17–13
x-Milwaukee Bucks	50	32	.610	7	32–9	18–23	17–13
x-Indiana Pacers	41	41	.500	16	28–13	13–28	13–16
x-Chicago Bulls	40	42	.488	17	29–12	11–30	17–12
Cleveland Cavaliers	31	51	.378	26	25–16	6–35	8–22

Midwest Division	W	L	PCT	GB	Home	Road	Div
y-Dallas Mavericks	55	27	.671	–	35–6	20–21	19–11
x-Utah Jazz	44	38	.537	11	31–10	13–28	19–11
x-Houston Rockets	42	40	.512	13	25–16	17–24	19–11
x-Denver Nuggets	37	45	.451	18	27–14	10–31	14–16
Sacramento Kings	29	53	.354	26	20–21	9–32	10–20
San Antonio Spurs	28	54	.341	27	21–20	7–34	9–21

Pacific Division	W	L	PCT	GB	Home	Road	Div
y-Los Angeles Lakers	65	17	.793	–	37–4	28–13	24–6
x-Portland Trail Blazers	49	33	.598	16	34–7	15–26	17–13
x-Golden State Warriors	42	40	.512	23	25–16	17–24	17–13
x-Seattle SuperSonics	39	43	.476	26	25–16	14–27	15–15
Phoenix Suns	36	46	.439	29	26–15	10–31	14–16
Los Angeles Clippers	12	70	.146	53	9–32	3–38	3–27

=== By conference ===
#	Eastern Conference				
#	Team	W	L	PCT	GB
1	c-Boston Celtics	59	23	.720	–
2	y-Atlanta Hawks	57	25	.695	2
3	x-Detroit Pistons	52	30	.634	7
4	x-Milwaukee Bucks	50	32	.610	9
5	x-Philadelphia 76ers	45	37	.549	14
6	x-Washington Bullets	42	40	.512	17
7	x-Indiana Pacers	41	41	.500	18
8	x-Chicago Bulls	40	42	.488	19
9	Cleveland Cavaliers	31	51	.378	28
10	New Jersey Nets	24	58	.293	35
11	New York Knicks	24	58	.293	35

#	Western Conference				
#	Team	W	L	PCT	GB
1	z-Los Angeles Lakers	65	17	.793	–
2	y-Dallas Mavericks	55	27	.671	10
3	x-Portland Trail Blazers	49	33	.598	16
4	x-Utah Jazz	44	38	.537	21
5	x-Golden State Warriors	42	40	.512	23
6	x-Houston Rockets	42	40	.512	23
7	x-Seattle SuperSonics	39	43	.476	26
8	x-Denver Nuggets	37	45	.451	28
9	Phoenix Suns	36	46	.439	29
10	Sacramento Kings	29	53	.354	36
11	San Antonio Spurs	28	54	.341	37
12	Los Angeles Clippers	12	70	.146	53

Notes

- z – Clinched home court advantage for the entire playoffs
- c – Clinched home court advantage for the conference playoffs
- y – Clinched division title
- x – Clinched playoff spot

== Playoffs ==
Teams in bold advanced to the next round. The numbers to the left of each team indicate the team's seeding in its conference, and the numbers to the right indicate the number of games the team won in that round. The division champions are marked by an asterisk. Home court advantage does not necessarily belong to the higher-seeded team, but instead the team with the better regular season record; teams enjoying the home advantage are shown in italics.

First Round	Conference Semifinals
**E1**	**Boston***	**3**
E8	Chicago	0
**E1**	**Boston***	**4**
E4	Milwaukee	3
**E4**	**Milwaukee**	**3**
E5	Philadelphia	2
**Eastern Conference**
**E3**	**Detroit**	**3**
E6	Washington	0
**E3**	**Detroit**	**4**
E2	Atlanta*	1
**E2**	**Atlanta***	**3**
E7	Indiana	1
**W1**	**LA Lakers***	**3**
W8	Denver	0
**W1**	**LA Lakers***	**4**
W5	Golden State	1
W4	Utah	2
**W5**	**Golden State**	**3**
**Western Conference**
W3	Portland	1
**W6**	**Houston**	**3**
W6	Houston	2
**W7**	**Seattle**	**4**
W2	Dallas*	1
**W7**	**Seattle**	**3**

Conference Finals
**E1**	**Boston***	**4**
E3	Detroit	3
**W1**	**LA Lakers***	**4**
W7	Seattle	0

NBA Finals
E1	Boston*	2
**W1**	**LA Lakers***	**4**

- * Division winner
- **Bold** Series winner
- Italic Team with home-court advantage

== Statistics leaders ==
Category	Player	Team	Stat
Points per game	Michael Jordan	Chicago Bulls	37.1
Rebounds per game	Charles Barkley	Philadelphia 76ers	14.6
Assists per game	Magic Johnson	Los Angeles Lakers	12.2
Steals per game	Alvin Robertson	San Antonio Spurs	3.21
Blocks per game	Mark Eaton	Utah Jazz	4.06
FG%	Kevin McHale	Boston Celtics	.604
FT%	Larry Bird	Boston Celtics	.910
3FG%	Kiki Vandeweghe	Portland Trail Blazers	.481

== NBA awards ==
=== Yearly awards ===
- Most Valuable Player: Magic Johnson, Los Angeles Lakers
- Rookie of the Year: Chuck Person, Indiana Pacers
- Defensive Player of the Year: Michael Cooper, Los Angeles Lakers
- Sixth Man of the Year: Ricky Pierce, Milwaukee Bucks
- Most Improved Player: Dale Ellis, Seattle SuperSonics
- Coach of the Year: Mike Schuler, Portland Trail Blazers

- All-NBA First Team:
  - F – Larry Bird, Boston Celtics
  - F – Kevin McHale, Boston Celtics
  - C – Akeem Olajuwon, Houston Rockets
  - G – Michael Jordan, Chicago Bulls
  - G – Magic Johnson, Los Angeles Lakers
- All-NBA Second Team:
  - F – Dominique Wilkins, Atlanta Hawks
  - F – Charles Barkley, Philadelphia 76ers
  - C – Moses Malone, Washington Bullets
  - G – Isiah Thomas, Detroit Pistons
  - G – Fat Lever, Denver Nuggets

- All-NBA Rookie Team:
  - John "Hot Rod" Williams, Cleveland Cavaliers
  - Roy Tarpley, Dallas Mavericks
  - Chuck Person, Indiana Pacers
  - Brad Daugherty, Cleveland Cavaliers
  - Ron Harper, Cleveland Cavaliers

- NBA All-Defensive First Team:
  - Kevin McHale, Boston Celtics
  - Michael Cooper, Los Angeles Lakers
  - Akeem Olajuwon, Houston Rockets
  - Alvin Robertson, San Antonio Spurs
  - Dennis Johnson, Boston Celtics
- NBA All-Defensive Second Team:
  - Paul Pressey, Milwaukee Bucks
  - Rodney McCray, Houston Rockets
  - Mark Eaton, Utah Jazz
  - Maurice Cheeks, Philadelphia 76ers
  - Derek Harper, Dallas Mavericks

=== Player of the week ===
The following players were named NBA Player of the Week.

Week	Player
October 31 – November 9	Michael Jordan (Chicago Bulls)
November 10 – November 16	Robert Parish (Boston Celtics)
November 17 – November 23	Alvin Robertson (San Antonio Spurs)
November 24 – November 30	Hot Rod Williams (Cleveland Cavaliers)
December 1 – December 7	Tom Chambers (Seattle SuperSonics)
December 8 – December 14	Dominique Wilkins (Atlanta Hawks)
December 15 – December 21	Magic Johnson (Los Angeles Lakers)
December 22 – December 28	Patrick Ewing (New York Knicks)
December 29 – January 4	Larry Bird (Boston Celtics)
January 5 – January 11	Isiah Thomas (Detroit Pistons)
January 12 – January 19	Otis Thorpe (Sacramento Kings)
January 20 – January 26	Alex English (Denver Nuggets)
January 27 – February 1	Fat Lever (Denver Nuggets)
February 2 – February 15	Magic Johnson (Los Angeles Lakers)
February 16 – February 22	Moses Malone (Washington Bullets)
February 23 – March 1	Michael Jordan (Chicago Bulls)
March 2 – March 8	Magic Johnson (Los Angeles Lakers)
March 9 – March 15	Karl Malone (Utah Jazz)
March 16 – March 22	Magic Johnson (Los Angeles Lakers)
March 23 – March 29	Larry Smith (Golden State Warriors)
March 30 – April 5	Magic Johnson (Los Angeles Lakers)
April 6 – April 12	Michael Jordan (Chicago Bulls)
April 13 – April 15	Julius Erving (Philadelphia 76ers)

=== Player of the month ===
The following players were named NBA Player of the Month.

Month	Player
November	Michael Jordan (Chicago Bulls)
December	Magic Johnson (Los Angeles Lakers)
January	Charles Barkley (Philadelphia 76ers)
February	Michael Jordan (Chicago Bulls)
March	Magic Johnson (Los Angeles Lakers)

=== Rookie of the month ===
The following players were named NBA Rookie of the Month.

Month	Rookie
November	Chuck Person (Indiana Pacers)
December	Ron Harper (Cleveland Cavaliers)
January	Ron Harper (Cleveland Cavaliers)
February	Chuck Person (Indiana Pacers)
March	Brad Daugherty (Cleveland Cavaliers)

=== Coach of the month ===
The following coaches were named NBA Coach of the Month.

Month	Coach
November	Pat Riley (Los Angeles Lakers)
December	Frank Layden (Utah Jazz)
January	Bill Fitch (Houston Rockets)
February	Mike Schuler (Portland Trail Blazers)
March	George Karl (Golden State Warriors)

== See also ==
- List of NBA regular season records
