= Richmond (surname) =

Richmond is an English surname. Notable people with the name include:

== Surname ==
- Aaron Richmond (1895–1965), American impresario
- Anthony B. Richmond (born 1942), English cinematographer
- Aubrey Richmond (1957–2025), Guyanese cyclist
- Barry Richmond (1947–2002), American systems scientist
- Bettina Richmond (1958–2009), German-American mathematician and murder victim
- Bill Richmond (1763–1829), American–born boxer
- Bill Richmond (writer) (1921–2016), American film and television comedy writer
- Bill Richmond (director) (born 1958), American television producer and director
- Branscombe Richmond (born 1955), American character actor
- Cedric Levon Richmond (born 1973), American politician
- Charles Wallace Richmond (1868–1932), American ornithologist
- Claude Richmond (born 1935), Canadian politician
- Dannie Richmond (1935–1988), American jazz drummer
- Danny Richmond (born 1984), American ice hockey player
- David Richmond (disambiguation), name of various individuals
- Dave Richmond (born 1938), British bass player
- Dean Richmond (1804–1866), New York railroad magnate
- Dennis Richmond (1943–2025), American television news anchor
- Deon Richmond (born 1978), American actor
- Dorothy Kate Richmond (1861–1935), New Zealand artist
- Duke of Richmond, English title, held by several individuals over the centuries
- E. J. Richmond (1825–1918), American author
- Earl of Richmond, English title, held by several individuals over the centuries
- Fiona Richmond (born 1945), English glamour model and actress
- Fred Richmond (1923–2019), American politician
- Fritz Richmond (1939–2005), American musician
- George Richmond (1809–1896), English painter
- Graeme Richmond (1934–1991), Australian rules footballer
- Henry Richmond (bishop) (1936–2017), Bishop of Repton in the Church of England
- Henry Richmond (politician) (1829–1890), 19th century New Zealand farmer and politician
- Herbert Richmond (1871–1946), British naval officer
- Hiram Lawton Richmond (1810–1885), American politician
- Howie Richmond (1918–2012), American music publisher and executive
- Hugh Richmond (1893–1940), Scottish footballer
- James Buchanan Richmond (1842–1910), American politician and lawyer
- James Crowe Richmond (1822–1898), New Zealand politician, engineer and artist
- Jane Richmond (born 1961), Welsh chess master
- Jeff Richmond (born 1960), American composer
- John Richmond (disambiguation), name of various individuals
- Jonathan Richmond (1774–1853), American politician
- Kadary Richmond (born 2001), American basketball player
- Kenneth Richmond (1926–2006), British wrestler
- L. Bruce Richmond (1920–2008), American businessman and politician
- Leigh Richmond (1911–1995), American writer
- Leonard Richmond (1889–1965), British artist
- Mike Richmond (skater) (born 1960), Australian skater
- Mitch Richmond (born 1965), American basketball player
- Sarah Richmond (philosopher), professor of philosophy at University College London
- Sarah Richmond (university president) (1843–1921), American teacher
- Tim Richmond (1955–1989), American race car driver
- Tim Richmond (photographer) (born 1959), English photographer.
- Timothy J. Richmond (born 1948), American molecular biologist
- Tom Richmond (disambiguation), name of various individuals
- Van Rensselaer Richmond (1812–1883), New York engineer and politician
- Volney Richmond (1802–1864), New York politician
- Warner Richmond (1886–1948), American actor
- William Richmond (politician) (1821–1895), New Zealand politician
- William Richmond (physician) (1941–2010) Scottish physician
- William Blake Richmond (1842–1921), English painter
- William Henry Richmond (1821–1922), American coal mine operator

== Middle name ==
John Richmond Webb, British general and politician

== Given name ==
Richmond C. Beatty, American academic, biographer, and critic

== Fictional characters ==
- Bonnie Richmond, a character in the American drama Jericho
- Lance Richmond, a character in Nexo Knights
- Stanley Richmond, a character in the American drama Jericho
