= List of people from Hawkhurst =

Notable people from or connected to Hawkhurst, Kent, England

This is a list of people from Hawkhurst, Kent, England.

== Born in Hawkhurst ==
- George Goschen (1866–1952), Member of Parliament, Governor of Madras and Acting Viceroy of India from 1929 to 1931.
- Rod Kedward (born 1937), historian.
- Nathaniel Lardner (1684–1768), theologian.
- John Leaney (chr, 1790), cricketer.
- William Leaney, cricketer.
- Tim Richmond (born 1959), photographer
- Charles Willis (1827–1895), cricketer.

== Old Marlboroughians ==
These people attended Marlborough House School.

- Wilbert Awdry (1911–1997), clergyman and author.
- David Gower (born 1957), cricketer.
- Stephen Poliakoff (born 1952), playwright.
- Peter Vansittart (1920–2008), novelist.

== Old Ronians ==
These people attended St Ronan's School during the time it has been based in Hawkhurst (since 1946).

- Raymond Bonham Carter (1929–2004), banker.
- Nick Brown (born 1950), MP.
- Richard Bridgeman (born 1947), peer and restaurateur.
- Frank Gardner (born 1961), journalist.
- Philip Langridge (1939–2010), musician.
- John Palmer (born 1940), hereditary peer

== People connected with Hawkhurst ==
These people have a connection with Hawkhurst

- William Angliss (1865–1957), businessman, was educated in Hawkhurst.
- Edward Crankshaw (1909–1984), writer, lived in Hawkhurst at the time of his death.
- Thomas Dunk (died 1718), Sheriff of London in 1711, lived in Hawkhurst.
- John Herschel (1792–1871), astronomer, lived in Hawkhurst at the time of his death.
- George Kilburne, (1839–1924) artist, was educated in Hawkhurst.
- John Mayers (1801–1865), cricketer, lived in Hawkhurst at the time of his death.
- William Penn, (1644–1718), founder of the Province of Pennsylvania, now the American State of Pennsylvania, owned an ironworks at Hawkhurst.
- William Rootes (1894–1964), established Rootes Motors in 1909 in Hawkhurst.
- Alexander Tolmer, (1815–1890), was educated in Hawkhurst and became a police officer in Australia.
- The Hawkhurst Gang, smugglers active from 1735 to 1749, were named after the village. They were based at the Oak and Ivy Inn.
