= Orlando Graham =

American basketball player (born 1965)

Personal information
- Born: May 5, 1965 (age 61) Montgomery, Alabama, U.S.
- Listed height: 6 ft 8 in (2.03 m)
- Listed weight: 220 lb (100 kg)

Career information
- High school: Sidney Lanier (Montgomery, Alabama)
- College: West Texas A&M (1984–1986); Auburn Montgomery (1986–1988)
- NBA draft: 1988: 2nd round, 40th overall pick
- Drafted by: Miami Heat
- Position: Power forward
- Number: 44

Career history
- 1989: Golden State Warriors
- 1992: Winnipeg Thunder
- Stats at NBA.com
- Stats at Basketball Reference

Orlando Graham (born May 5, 1965) is an American former professional basketball player who was selected by the Miami Heat in the second round (40th pick overall) of the 1988 NBA draft. Graham was born in Montgomery, Alabama and graduated from Sidney Lanier High School in 1984. A 6'8" forward, Graham played two seasons for Auburn University at Montgomery. He earned First-Team All-American honors and became the first Senator to win the NAIA Player of the Year Award during the 1987–88 season. Graham played in only one NBA season for the Golden State Warriors during the 1988-89 NBA season. He appeared in 7 games and scored a total of 8 points in his brief NBA career. Graham was the fifth ever draft pick in Miami Heat history. Orlando Graham was also selected as a candidate for 1988 Men's Olympic Basketball team in representing USA. Graham is one of just two former Senators to play professionally in the National Basketball Association (NBA) and one of four AUM men's basketball players to have his jersey retired. Graham also played for the Winnipeg Thunder of the World Basketball League.

== Career statistics ==
Legend
GP	Games played	GS	Games started	MPG	Minutes per game
FG%	Field goal percentage	3P%	3-point field goal percentage	FT%	Free throw percentage
RPG	Rebounds per game	APG	Assists per game	SPG	Steals per game
BPG	Blocks per game	PPG	Points per game	**Bold**	Career high

=== NBA ===
==== Regular season ====
Year	Team	GP	GS	MPG	FG%	3P%	FT%	RPG	APG	SPG	BPG	PPG
1988–89	Golden State	7	0	3.1	.300	–	.500	1.6	.0	.0	.0	1.1

==== Playoffs ====
Year	Team	GP	GS	MPG	FG%	3P%	FT%	RPG	APG	SPG	BPG	PPG
1989	Golden State	2	0	4.0	.500	–	.500	.5	.0	.0	.0	1.5
