= Henry Richmond =

Henry Richmond may refer to:

- Henry Richmond (bishop) (1936–2017), Bishop of Repton
- Henry Richmond (1943–2021), American attorney, inaugural director of the land use watchdog group 1000 Friends of Oregon
- Henry Richmond (politician) (1829–1890), New Zealand politician and farmer
- Henry of Richmond, Henry VII of England

== See also ==
- Richmond (surname)
