= 1988–89 Golden State Warriors season =

NBA professional basketball team season

- Head coach: Don Nelson
- President: Don Nelson
- General manager: Don Nelson
- Arena: Oakland–Alameda County Coliseum Arena

Results
- Record: 43–39 (.524)
- Place: Division: 4th (Pacific); Conference: 7th (Western)
- Playoff finish: West Conference Semi-finals (lost to Suns 1–4)
- Stats at Basketball Reference

Local media
- Television: KPIX-TV; KICU-TV (Greg Papa, Jim Barnett)
- Radio: KNBR (Greg Papa, Jim Barnett)

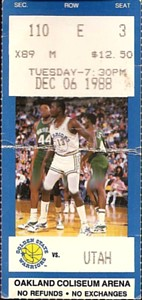
A ticket for a 1988-89 game between the Warriors and the Jazz.

The 1988–89 Golden State Warriors season was the 43rd season for the Golden State Warriors in the National Basketball Association, and their 26th season in the San Francisco Bay Area.

== Season summary ==
=== Off-season ===
General Manager Don Nelson became the Warriors' new head coach this season. The Warriors received the fifth overall pick in the 1988 NBA draft, and selected shooting guard Mitch Richmond out of Kansas State University. During the off-season, the team acquired 7' 7" center Manute Bol from the Washington Bullets.

For the season, the Warriors slightly redesigned their primary logo. The team replaced the color yellow with golden yellow to the state of California with a slated blue star on the Bay Area, and to their basketball with slated blue seams; the wordmark of the words "Golden State", and the team name "Warriors" were also changed. The team's new primary logo would remain in use until 1997.

=== Regular season ===
Under Nelson, and with the addition of Richmond and Bol, the Warriors got off to a 12–16 start to the regular season. However, the team posted an eight-game winning streak in January afterwards, and later on held a 25–20 record at the All-Star break. Despite losing their final six games of the season, the Warriors finished in fourth place in the Pacific Division with a 43–39 record, and earned the seventh seed in the Western Conference; it was a 20-game improvement over the previous season.

Chris Mullin averaged 26.5 points, 5.9 rebounds, 5.1 assists and 2.1 steals per game, while Richmond averaged 22.0 points, 5.9 rebounds and 4.2 assists per game, and was named the NBA Rookie of the Year, and was also named to the NBA All-Rookie First Team. In addition, Terry Teagle provided the team with 15.2 points per game, and second-year guard Winston Garland contributed 14.5 points, 6.4 assists and 2.2 steals per game, while off the bench, sixth man Rod Higgins provided with 10.6 points and 4.6 rebounds, and Otis Smith contributed 10.0 points and 4.1 rebounds per game. On the defensive side, Ralph Sampson averaged 6.4 points and 5.0 rebounds per game, while Larry Smith provided with 5.7 points and 8.2 rebounds per game, and Bol contributed 3.9 points, 5.8 rebounds and 4.3 blocks per game, but struggled only shooting .369 in field-goal percentage.

During the NBA All-Star weekend at the Houston Astrodome in Houston, Texas, Mullin was selected for the 1989 NBA All-Star Game, as a member of the Western Conference All-Star team; it was his first ever All-Star appearance. Mullin finished in third place in Most Improved Player voting, and also finished tied in 13th place in Most Valuable Player voting, while Bol finished in fourth place in Defensive Player of the Year voting, and Nelson finished in second place in Coach of the Year voting, behind Cotton Fitzsimmons of the Phoenix Suns.

The Warriors finished 14th in the NBA in home-game attendance, with an attendance of 587,820 at the Oakland-Alameda County Coliseum Arena during the regular season.

=== NBA playoffs ===
In the Western Conference First Round of the 1989 NBA playoffs, the Warriors faced off against the 2nd–seeded, and Midwest Division champion Utah Jazz, who were led by the All-Star trio of Karl Malone, John Stockton, and Defensive Player of the Year, Mark Eaton. The Warriors managed to win the first two games over the Jazz on the road at the Salt Palace, before winning Game 3 at home, 120–106 at the Oakland-Alameda County Coliseum Arena to win the series in a three-game sweep.

In the Western Conference Semi-finals, the team faced off against the 3rd–seeded Suns, who were led by the trio of All-Star forward Tom Chambers, Sixth Man of the Year, Eddie Johnson, and second-year star, and Most Improved Player of the Year, Kevin Johnson. With the series tied at 1–1, the Warriors lost the next two games at the Oakland-Alameda County Coliseum Arena, before losing Game 5 to the Suns on the road, 116–104 at the Arizona Veterans Memorial Coliseum, thus losing the series in five games.

=== Aftermath ===
Following the season, Otis Smith was left unprotected in the 1989 NBA expansion draft, where he was selected by the Orlando Magic expansion team, while Larry Smith signed as a free agent with the Houston Rockets, and Sampson was traded to the Sacramento Kings.

== Draft picks ==
Round	Pick	Player	Position	Nationality	College
1	5	Mitch Richmond	SG	United States	Kansas State
2	41	Keith Smart	PG	United States	Indiana

== Roster ==
1988–89 Golden State Warriors roster
Players

Pos.	No.	Player	Height	Weight	DOB	From
G	4	Steve Alford	6 ft 2 in (1.88 m)	183 lb (83 kg)	1964–11–23	Indiana
C	10	Manute Bol	7 ft 7 in (2.31 m)	200 lb (91 kg)	1962–10–16	Bridgeport
F	32	Tellis Frank	6 ft 10 in (2.08 m)	225 lb (102 kg)	1965–04–25	Western Kentucky
G	12	Winston Garland	6 ft 2 in (1.88 m)	170 lb (77 kg)	1964–12–19	Missouri State
F	44	Orlando Graham	6 ft 8 in (2.03 m)	220 lb (100 kg)	1965–05–05	Auburn Montgomery
F	22	Rod Higgins	6 ft 7 in (2.01 m)	200 lb (91 kg)	1960–01–31	Fresno State
F	30	Ben McDonald	6 ft 8 in (2.03 m)	210 lb (95 kg)	1962–07–20	UC Irvine
F	17	Chris Mullin	6 ft 6 in (1.98 m)	200 lb (91 kg)	1963–07–30	St. John's
G	23	Mitch Richmond	6 ft 5 in (1.96 m)	215 lb (98 kg)	1965–06–30	Kansas State
C	50	Ralph Sampson	7 ft 4 in (2.24 m)	228 lb (103 kg)	1960–07–07	Virginia
F	13	Larry Smith	6 ft 8 in (2.03 m)	215 lb (98 kg)	1958–01–18	Alcorn State
G/F	18	Otis Smith	6 ft 5 in (1.96 m)	210 lb (95 kg)	1964–01–30	Jacksonville
G	30	John Starks	6 ft 3 in (1.91 m)	180 lb (82 kg)	1965–08–10	Oklahoma State
G/F	20	Terry Teagle	6 ft 5 in (1.96 m)	195 lb (88 kg)	1960–04–10	Baylor

Coaches
Head coach
- Don Nelson
Assistant(s)
- Mike Schuler
- Garry St. Jean
- Donnie Nelson

Legend
- (DP) Unsigned draft pick
- (FA) Free agent
- (S) Suspended
- Injured

== Regular season ==
=== Season standings ===
Pacific Division	W	L	PCT	GB	Home	Road	Div
y-Los Angeles Lakers	57	25	.695	–	35–6	22–19	25–9
x-Phoenix Suns	55	27	.671	2	35–6	20–21	23–11
x-Seattle SuperSonics	47	35	.573	10	31–10	16–25	20–14
x-Golden State Warriors	43	39	.524	14	29–12	14–27	15–19
x-Portland Trail Blazers	39	43	.476	18	28–13	11–30	17–17
Sacramento Kings	27	55	.329	30	21–20	6–35	12–22
Los Angeles Clippers	21	61	.256	36	17–24	4–37	7–27

#	Western Conference				
#	Team	W	L	PCT	GB
1	c-Los Angeles Lakers	57	25	.695	–
2	y-Utah Jazz	51	31	.622	6
3	x-Phoenix Suns	55	27	.671	2
4	x-Seattle SuperSonics	47	35	.573	10
5	x-Houston Rockets	45	37	.549	12
6	x-Denver Nuggets	44	38	.537	13
7	x-Golden State Warriors	43	39	.524	14
8	x-Portland Trail Blazers	39	43	.476	18
9	Dallas Mavericks	38	44	.463	19
10	Sacramento Kings	27	55	.329	30
11	San Antonio Spurs	21	61	.256	36
12	Los Angeles Clippers	21	61	.256	36
13	Miami Heat	15	67	.183	42

z - clinched division title
y - clinched division title
x - clinched playoff spot

== Game log ==
=== Regular season ===
1988–89 game log
Total: 43–39 (home: 29–12; road: 14–27)
November: 6–7 (home: 3–3; road: 3–4)

Game	Date	Team	Score	High points	High rebounds	High assists	Location Attendance	Record
1	November 5	Phoenix	W 117–104				Oakland–Alameda County Coliseum Arena	1–0
2	November 8; 7:30 p.m. PST	L.A. Lakers	L 102–114	Mullin (26)	Bol (9)	Bol, Mullin (5)	Oakland–Alameda County Coliseum Arena; 15,025	1–1
3	November 9	@ Seattle	W 113–108				Seattle Center Coliseum	2–1
4	November 11	@ Phoenix	L 103–141				Arizona Veterans Memorial Coliseum	2–2
5	November 12	Portland	W 107–100				Oakland–Alameda County Coliseum Arena	3–2
6	November 14	@ New Jersey	W 100–96				Brendan Byrne Arena	4–2
7	November 16	@ Boston	L 104–107				Boston Garden	4–3
8	November 18	@ Miami	W 123–117 (OT)				Miami Arena	5–3
9	November 19	@ Atlanta	L 92–111				The Omni	5–4
10	November 23	Seattle	L 85–93				Oakland–Alameda County Coliseum Arena	5–5
11	November 26	Houston	L 109–119				Oakland–Alameda County Coliseum Arena	5–6
12	November 27	@ Portland	L 94–109				Memorial Coliseum	5–7
13	November 29; 7:30 p.m. PST	Chicago	W 109–99	Mullin (29)	Sampson (10)	Mullin (8)	Oakland–Alameda County Coliseum Arena; 15,025	6–7

December: 5–7 (home: 4–1; road: 1–6)

Game	Date	Team	Score	High points	High rebounds	High assists	Location Attendance	Record
14	December 2	@ Denver	L 102–129				McNichols Sports Arena	6–8
15	December 3	@ Seattle	L 106–136				Seattle Center Coliseum	6–9
16	December 6	Utah	W 114–103				Oakland–Alameda County Coliseum Arena	7–9
17	December 9	@ Phoenix	L 105–110				Arizona Veterans Memorial Coliseum	7–10
18	December 10	Washington	W 119–112				Oakland–Alameda County Coliseum Arena	8–10
19	December 13	@ Dallas	L 111–117				Reunion Arena	8–11
20	December 15	@ Houston	L 115–124 (2OT)				The Summit	8–12
21	December 17	@ San Antonio	W 123–113				HemisFair Arena	9–12
22	December 20	L.A. Clippers	W 113–111				Oakland–Alameda County Coliseum Arena	10–12
23	December 22	Portland	L 109–117				Oakland–Alameda County Coliseum Arena	10–13
24	December 23	@ Portland	L 107–111				Memorial Coliseum	10–14
25	December 27	Philadelphia	W 119–112				Oakland–Alameda County Coliseum Arena	11–14

January: 11–5 (home: 7–1; road: 4–4)

Game	Date	Team	Score	High points	High rebounds	High assists	Location Attendance	Record
26	January 4	Miami	W 109–100				Oakland–Alameda County Coliseum Arena	12–14
27	January 5	@ Denver	L 129–131				McNichols Sports Arena	12–15
28	January 7	San Antonio	L 102–104				Oakland–Alameda County Coliseum Arena	12–16
29	January 9	Phoenix	W 130–124				Oakland–Alameda County Coliseum Arena	13–16
30	January 11	Dallas	W 107–106				Oakland–Alameda County Coliseum Arena	14–16
31	January 13	@ L.A. Clippers	W 127–113				Los Angeles Memorial Sports Arena	15–16
32	January 14	Utah	W 131–105				Oakland–Alameda County Coliseum Arena	16–16
33	January 16	Seattle	W 146–117				Oakland–Alameda County Coliseum Arena	17–16
34	January 18	New York	W 133–119				Oakland–Alameda County Coliseum Arena	18–16
35	January 20	Houston	W 121–114				Oakland–Alameda County Coliseum Arena	19–16
36	January 21	@ Sacramento	W 136–111				ARCO Arena	20–16
37	January 23	@ Cleveland	L 109–142				Richfield Coliseum	20–17
38	January 25; 4:30 p.m. PST	@ Detroit	L 104–105	Mullin (28)	Bol (11)	Mullin (7)	The Palace of Auburn Hills; 21,454	20–18
39	January 27	@ Philadelphia	L 112–113				The Spectrum	20–19
40	January 28	@ Indiana	W 114–112				Market Square Arena	21–19
41	January 30	@ Miami	W 105–98				Miami Arena	22–19

February: 9–2 (home: 5–0; road: 4–2)

Game	Date	Team	Score	High points	High rebounds	High assists	Location Attendance	Record
42	February 2	New Jersey	W 127–113				Oakland–Alameda County Coliseum Arena	23–19
43	February 4	L.A. Clippers	W 116–107				Oakland–Alameda County Coliseum Arena	24–19
44	February 8; 7:30 p.m. PST	@ L.A. Lakers	W 121–118	Mullin (28)	Mullin (7)	Mullin (11)	Great Western Forum; 17,505	25–19
45	February 9	@ Sacramento	L 117–142				ARCO Arena	25–20
All-Star Break
46	February 15	San Antonio	W 133–96				Oakland–Alameda County Coliseum Arena	26–20
47	February 16	@ L.A. Clippers	W 143–138 (OT)				Los Angeles Memorial Sports Arena	27–20
48	February 18; 7:00 p.m. PST	Detroit	W 121–119 (OT)	Mullin (26)	Bol (10)	Garland (5)	Oakland–Alameda County Coliseum Arena; 15,025	28–20
49	February 21	@ Phoenix	L 121–139				Arizona Veterans Memorial Coliseum	28–21
50	February 22	@ San Antonio	W 118–107				HemisFair Arena	29–21
51	February 24	@ Dallas	W 127–92				Reunion Arena	30–21
52	February 27	Denver	W 141–132				Oakland–Alameda County Coliseum Arena	31–21

March: 9–10 (home: 7–3; road: 2–7)

Game	Date	Team	Score	High points	High rebounds	High assists	Location Attendance	Record
53	March 1; 7:30 p.m. PST	@ L.A. Lakers	L 121–142	Mullin (23)	Sampson, O. Smith (6)	Garland (4)	Great Western Forum; 17,505	31–22
54	March 2	Indiana	L 127–131 (OT)				Oakland–Alameda County Coliseum Arena	31–23
55	March 4	Sacramento	W 155–143				Oakland–Alameda County Coliseum Arena	32–23
56	March 5	@ Sacramento	L 96–110				ARCO Arena	32–24
57	March 7	L.A. Clippers	W 138–112				Oakland–Alameda County Coliseum Arena	33–24
58	March 9	Cleveland	W 120–114				Oakland–Alameda County Coliseum Arena	34–24
59	March 10	@ Utah	L 112–126				Salt Palace	34–25
60	March 12; 5:00 p.m. PST	L.A. Lakers	L 115–126	Mullin (27)	Mullin (14)	Richmond (4)	Oakland–Alameda County Coliseum Arena; 15,025	34–26
61	March 14	@ Portland	L 110–139				Memorial Coliseum	34–27
62	March 15	Dallas	W 113–100				Oakland–Alameda County Coliseum Arena	35–27
63	March 17	Atlanta	W 127–118 (OT)				Oakland–Alameda County Coliseum Arena	36–27
64	March 19	Charlotte	W 124–117				Oakland–Alameda County Coliseum Arena	38–27
65	March 21	Portland	W 151–127				Oakland–Alameda County Coliseum Arena	38–27
66	March 23	Phoenix	L 124–154				Oakland–Alameda County Coliseum Arena	38–28
67	March 25	@ Houston	L 104–144				The Summit	38–29
68	March 27	@ Milwaukee	L 109–121				Bradley Center	38–30
69	March 28; 5:30 p.m. PST	@ Chicago	L 106–115	Mullin (27)	L. Smith (13)	Garland (9)	Chicago Stadium; 18,013	38–31
70	March 30	@ Charlotte	W 113–104				Charlotte Coliseum	39–31
71	March 31	@ New York	W 134–114				Madison Square Garden	40–31

April: 3–8 (home: 3–4; road: 0–4)

Game	Date	Team	Score	High points	High rebounds	High assists	Location Attendance	Record
72	April 2	@ Washington	L 103–120				Capital Centre	40–32
73	April 4	Milwaukee	L 118–124				Oakland–Alameda County Coliseum Arena	40–33
74	April 6	Boston	W 132–118				Oakland–Alameda County Coliseum Arena	41–33
75	April 8; 7:30 p.m. PDT	L.A. Lakers	W 122–116	Mullin (33)	Mullin, L. Smith (7)	Garland (6)	Oakland–Alameda County Coliseum Arena; 15,025	42–33
76	April 11	Miami	W 114–98				Oakland–Alameda County Coliseum Arena	43–33
77	April 13	@ L.A. Clippers	L 126–128 (OT)				Los Angeles Memorial Sports Arena	43–34
78	April 15	Sacramento	L 110–114				Oakland–Alameda County Coliseum Arena	43–35
79	April 17	Seattle	L 109–116 (OT)				Oakland–Alameda County Coliseum Arena	43–36
80	April 18	@ Seattle	L 118–122				Seattle Center Coliseum	43–37
81	April 21	Denver	L 121–139				Oakland–Alameda County Coliseum Arena	43–38
82	April 22	@ Utah	L 95–111				Salt Palace	43–39

1988–89 schedule

== Playoffs ==
1989 playoff game log
Western Conference First Round: 3–0 (home: 1–0; road: 2–0)

Game	Date	Team	Score	High points	High rebounds	High assists	Location Attendance	Series
1	April 27	@ Utah	W 123–119	Mullin (41)	Smith (11)	Garland (8)	Salt Palace; 12,444	1–0
2	April 29	@ Utah	W 99–91	Mullin (22)	Higgins, Mullin, Richmond (7)	Mullin (7)	Salt Palace; 12,444	2–0
3	May 2	Utah	W 120–106	Mullin (35)	Higgins (14)	Richmond (11)	Oakland–Alameda County Coliseum Arena; 15,025	3–0

Western Conference Semifinals: 1–4 (home: 0–2; road: 1–2)

Game	Date	Team	Score	High points	High rebounds	High assists	Location Attendance	Series
1	May 6	@ Phoenix	L 103–130	Mullin, Teagle (18)	Smith (8)	Garland (6)	Arizona Veterans Memorial Coliseum; 14,471	0–1
2	May 9	@ Phoenix	W 127–122	Mullin (37)	Richmond (13)	Mullin (5)	Arizona Veterans Memorial Coliseum; 14,471	1–1
3	May 11	Phoenix	L 104–113	Mullin (32)	Bol, Higgins (9)	Mullin (6)	Oakland–Alameda County Coliseum Arena; 15,025	1–2
4	May 13	Phoenix	L 99–135	Mullin (28)	Mullin (7)	Garland (4)	Oakland–Alameda County Coliseum Arena; 15,025	1–3
5	May 16	@ Phoenix	L 104–116	Richmond (23)	Smith (9)	Mullin (6)	Arizona Veterans Memorial Coliseum; 14,471	1–4

1989 schedule

== Awards and records ==
- Chris Mullin, NBA All-Star Game
- Mitch Richmond, NBA Rookie of the Year Award
- Chris Mullin, All-NBA Second Team
- Mitch Richmond, NBA All-Rookie Team 1st Team

== See also ==
- 1988-89 NBA season
