= John Richmond =

John Richmond may refer to:

- John P. Richmond (1811–1895), American Methodist missionary
- John Richmond (diplomat) (1909–1990), British diplomat and author
- John Richmond (fashion designer) (born 1960), English fashion designer
- John Richmond (English footballer) (1938–2018), English footballer
- John Richmond (Australian footballer) (born 1943), Australian rules footballer
- John Richmond (lawyer) (1765–1846), friend of Robert Burns the poet
- John Richmond (shortstop) (1855–1898), American Major League Baseball shortstop
- John Lee Richmond (1857–1929), American Major League Baseball pitcher
- Eli the Eliminator (real name John Richmond, born 1958), American professional wrestler
