= Winston Garland =

American basketball player (born 1964)

Personal information
- Born: December 19, 1964 (age 61) Gary, Indiana, U.S.
- Listed height: 6 ft 2 in (1.88 m)
- Listed weight: 170 lb (77 kg)

Career information
- High school: Theodore Roosevelt (Gary, Indiana)
- College: Southeastern CC (1983–1985); Missouri State (1985–1987)
- NBA draft: 1987: 2nd round, 40th overall pick
- Drafted by: Milwaukee Bucks
- Playing career: 1987–1995
- Position: Point guard
- Number: 12, 11, 22

Career history
- 1987–1990: Golden State Warriors
- 1990–1991: Los Angeles Clippers
- 1991–1992: Denver Nuggets
- 1992–1993: Houston Rockets
- 1993–1994: Benetton Treviso
- 1994–1995: Minnesota Timberwolves

Career highlights
- AMCU Player of the Year (1987); 2× First-team All-AMCU (1986, 1987); AMCU tournament MVP (1987); No. 22 retired by Missouri State Bears

Career NBA statistics
- Points: 4,799 (9.4 ppg)
- Rebounds: 1,433 (2.8 rpg)
- Assists: 2,421 (4.7 apg)
- Stats at NBA.com
- Stats at Basketball Reference

Winston Kinnard Garland (born December 19, 1964) is an American former professional basketball player at the point guard position. He played collegiately at the Southeastern Community College (Iowa) for two seasons (1983–84 and 1984–85), and then at the Missouri State University for the two following seasons. He was selected by the Milwaukee Bucks in the second round (40th pick overall) of the 1987 NBA draft. Garland played eight professional seasons, 7 of which were in the NBA, where he played for 5 teams – Golden State Warriors (1987 to 1990), Los Angeles Clippers (1990–91), Denver Nuggets (1991–92), Houston Rockets (1992–93) and Minnesota Timberwolves (1994–95).

In his NBA career, Garland played in 511 games and scored a total of 4,799 points. His best year as a professional came during the 1988–89 season as a member of the Warriors, appearing in 79 games and averaging 14.5 ppg. In his rookie campaign, Garland was the first Warrior to record a triple double in five years.

He played one year professionally in Italy, for Benetton Treviso (1993–94, won the Italian Cup). He attended and played for Roosevelt High School, the same school that produced NBA players Dick Barnett and Glenn Robinson. In his junior year, Garland lost the 1982 Indiana State Championship in the last seconds to Plymouth High School, which was led by Scott Skiles, who would go on to play in the NBA. In 2007, he was inducted into the Indiana High School Basketball Hall of Fame Silver Anniversary Team. Following his playing career, Garland was the head boys' basketball coach at Gary West Side High School in Gary, Indiana from 2009 to 2012.

Garland is the father of Los Angeles Clippers player Darius Garland.

== Career statistics ==
Legend
| GP | Games played | GS | Games started | MPG | Minutes per game |
| FG% | Field goal percentage | 3P% | 3-point field goal percentage | FT% | Free throw percentage |
| RPG | Rebounds per game | APG | Assists per game | SPG | Steals per game |
| BPG | Blocks per game | PPG | Points per game | **Bold** | Career high |

=== Regular season ===
| Year | Team | GP | GS | MPG | FG% | 3P% | FT% | RPG | APG | SPG | BPG | PPG |
|---|---|---|---|---|---|---|---|---|---|---|---|---|
| 1987–88 | Golden State | 67 | 62 | 31.7 | .439 | .333 | .879 | 3.4 | **6.4** | 1.7 | .1 | 12.4 |
| 1988–89 | Golden State | **79** | **79** | **33.7** | .434 | .233 | .809 | **4.2** | **6.4** | **2.2** | .2 | **14.5** |
| 1989–90 | Golden State | 51 | 4 | 17.5 | .375 | .100 | .841 | 2.2 | 3.1 | .9 | .1 | 5.3 |
| 1989–90 | L.A. Clippers | 28 | 15 | 31.1 | .428 | .423 | .831 | 3.7 | 5.2 | 1.1 | .2 | 10.9 |
| 1990–91 | L.A. Clippers | 69 | 26 | 24.7 | .426 | .154 | .752 | 2.9 | 4.6 | 1.4 | .1 | 8.2 |
| 1991–92 | Denver | 78 | 67 | 28.3 | **.444** | .321 | .859 | 2.4 | 5.3 | 1.3 | **.3** | 10.8 |
| 1992–93 | Houston | 66 | 4 | 15.2 | .443 | **.462** | **.910** | 1.6 | 2.1 | .6 | .1 | 5.9 |
| 1994–95 | Minnesota | 73 | 58 | 26.5 | .415 | .253 | .795 | 2.3 | 4.4 | 1.0 | .2 | 6.1 |
| Career | | 511 | 315 | 26.2 | .430 | .281 | .830 | 2.8 | 4.7 | 1.3 | .2 | 9.4 |

=== Playoffs ===
| Year | Team | GP | GS | MPG | FG% | 3P% | FT% | RPG | APG | SPG | BPG | PPG |
|---|---|---|---|---|---|---|---|---|---|---|---|---|
| 1989 | Golden State | 8 | **8** | **33.8** | **.418** | **.333** | .857 | **4.1** | **3.6** | **1.6** | **.3** | **13.4** |
| 1993 | Houston | **12** | 5 | 20.5 | .405 | .000 | **1.000** | 2.8 | 2.6 | 1.3 | .0 | 6.4 |
| Career | | 20 | 13 | 21.7 | .413 | .250 | .911 | 3.3 | 3.0 | 1.5 | .1 | 9.2 |
