= David Richmond =

David Richmond may refer to:

- David Richmond (officer) (1748–1818), American Revolutionary War commissioned officer
- David Richmond (American football) (born 1987), American football wide receiver
- David Richmond (activist) (1941–1990), American civil rights activist
- David Richmond (Lord Provost of Glasgow) (1843–1908), Scottish businessman and Lord Provost of Glasgow
- Dave Richmond, English bass player

== See also ==
- David Richmond-Peck (born 1974), Canadian actor
