= Larry Smith (basketball, born 1958) =

American basketball player

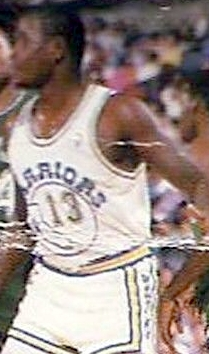
- Smith with the Golden State Warriors during the 1987-88 season

Personal information
- Born: January 18, 1958 (age 68) Rolling Fork, Mississippi, U.S.
- Listed height: 6 ft 8 in (2.03 m)
- Listed weight: 215 lb (98 kg)

Career information
- High school: Simmons (Hollandale, Mississippi)
- College: Alcorn State (1976–1980)
- NBA draft: 1980: 2nd round, 24th overall pick
- Drafted by: Golden State Warriors
- Playing career: 1980–1993
- Position: Power forward
- Number: 13, 2
- Coaching career: 1993–2011

Career history

Playing
- 1980–1989: Golden State Warriors
- 1989–1992: Houston Rockets
- 1992–1993: San Antonio Spurs

Coaching
- 1993–2003: Houston Rockets (assistant)
- 2003–2004: Atlanta Hawks (assistant)
- 2004–2005: Los Angeles Lakers (assistant)
- 2005–2006: Albuquerque Thunderbirds (assistant)
- 2006–2007: Anaheim Arsenal
- 2007: Austin Toros (assistant)
- 2008: Los Angeles Sparks (assistant)
- 2008–2011: Alcorn State

Career highlights
- As player: NBA All-Rookie Team (1981); NCAA rebounding leader (1980); 2× SWAC Player of the Year (1979, 1980); 2× First-team All-SWAC (1979, 1980); As assistant coach: 2× NBA champion (1994, 1995)

Career statistics
- Points: 5,904 (6.7 ppg)
- Rebounds: 8,125 (9.2 rpg)
- Assists: 941 (1.1 apg)
- Stats at NBA.com
- Stats at Basketball Reference

Larry Smith (born January 18, 1958) is an American former professional basketball player. A 6'8" power forward from Alcorn State University, Smith spent 13 seasons (1980–1993) in the National Basketball Association (NBA), playing for the Golden State Warriors, Houston Rockets, and San Antonio Spurs. Smith, nicknamed "Mr. Mean", received NBA All-Rookie Team Honors in 1981, and would become one of the best rebounders of the 1980s. He had career averages of 9.2 rebounds and 25.9 minutes per game. Smith was affectionally nicknamed and known as "Mr. Mean" throughout his career, especially during his time with the Warriors, due to the stark contrast between him being nice and soft-spoken off the court but always with a serious demeanor and angry scowl on the court while grabbing a rebound. Smith's popularity in Golden State and Houston led to local fan clubs who would attend games wearing hard hats holding up a sign saying "Larry's Local 13". At the end of his career, Smith earned praise from the Houston Rockets coaching staff and fanbase for adequately covering for an injured Hakeem Olajuwon.

He worked as an assistant coach for Rudy Tomjanovich with the Rockets from 1993 until 2002, helping them capture their back-to-back NBA titles in 1993-94 and 1994-95. After ten years with the Rockets, Smith was hired as the assistant coach for the Atlanta Hawks in 2003. In 2004, he was hired by the Los Angeles Lakers to be the assistant coach for Tomjanovich. However, Tomjanovich resigned after 41 games into the 2004–05 season. Smith remained as an assistant coach for interim head coach Frank Hamblen until the end of the season.

After serving as an assistant coach of the Albuquerque Thunderbirds, as the head coach of the Anaheim Arsenal, and as an assistant coach for the Austin Toros in the NBA D-League, Smith was hired to be an assistant coach for the Los Angeles Sparks of the Women's National Basketball Association (WNBA) for the 2008 season.

On May 8, 2008, officials made the announcement during a news conference in Vicksburg, Mississippi that Smith has been named as the head basketball coach for Alcorn State University. In 2011, Smith was moved from this position to become director of athletic development for the school.

He holds the NBA joint record for the most offensive rebounds in a quarter with 11, versus the Denver Nuggets on March 23 1986, tied with Charles Barkley.

== NBA career statistics ==
Legend
GP	Games played	GS	Games started	MPG	Minutes per game
FG%	Field goal percentage	3P%	3-point field goal percentage	FT%	Free throw percentage
RPG	Rebounds per game	APG	Assists per game	SPG	Steals per game
BPG	Blocks per game	PPG	Points per game	**Bold**	Career high

*	Led the league

=== Regular season ===
Year	Team	GP	GS	MPG	FG%	3P%	FT%	RPG	APG	SPG	BPG	PPG
1980–81	Golden State	**82**	–	31.4	.512	–	.588	**12.1**	1.1	0.9	**0.8**	9.6
1981–82	Golden State	74	55	29.9	.534	.000	.553	11.0	1.1	0.9	0.7	7.1
1982–83	Golden State	49	41	29.2	**.588**	–	.535	9.9	0.9	0.7	0.4	8.4
1983–84	Golden State	75	63	29.2	.560	–	.560	9.0	1.0	0.8	0.3	7.8
1984–85	Golden State	80	**78**	31.2	.530	–	**.605**	10.9	1.2	**1.0**	0.7	**11.1**
1985–86	Golden State	77	74	**31.7**	.536	.000	.493	11.1	1.2	0.8	0.6	9.6
1986–87	Golden State	80	78	29.7	.546	.000	.574	11.5	1.2	0.9	0.7	8.8
1987–88	Golden State	20	10	25.0	.472	.000	.407	9.1	1.3	0.6	0.6	6.4
1988–89	Golden State	80	78	23.7	.552	–	.310	8.2	**1.5**	0.8	0.7	5.7
1989–90	Houston	74	0	17.6	.474	.000	.364	6.1	0.9	0.8	0.4	3.0
1990–91	Houston	81	28	23.7	.487	–	.240	8.8	1.1	**1.0**	0.3	3.3
1991–92	Houston	45	7	17.8	.543	.000	.364	5.7	0.7	0.5	0.2	2.3
1992–93	San Antonio	66	13	12.6	.437	–	.409	4.1	0.4	0.3	0.2	1.3
Career		883	525	25.9	.531	.000	.531	9.2	1.1	0.8	0.5	6.7

=== Playoffs ===
Year	Team	GP	GS	MPG	FG%	3P%	FT%	RPG	APG	SPG	BPG	PPG
1987	Golden State	**10**	**10**	**32.9**	.531	–	.708	**13.7***	1.7	**1.2**	0.6	**10.3**
1989	Golden State	8	8	18.5	.250	–	–	5.0	**2.0**	0.8	**1.4**	1.0
1990	Houston	4	0	18.3	**.750**	–	–	3.3	1.3	1.0	0.0	3.0
1991	Houston	3	0	19.0	.250	.000	.000	4.3	1.3	0.3	0.3	0.7
1993	San Antonio	6	0	8.3	.667	–	**.750**	2.7	0.2	0.7	0.3	1.2

== See also ==
- List of NBA single-game rebounding leaders
- List of NCAA Division I men's basketball season rebounding leaders
