= 1988–89 Los Angeles Lakers season =

NBA pro basketball team season

- Conference champions
- Division champions
- Head coach: Pat Riley
- General manager: Jerry West
- Owners: Jerry Buss
- Arena: Great Western Forum

Results
- Record: 57–25 (.695)
- Place: Division: 1st (Pacific); Conference: 1st (Western)
- Playoff finish: NBA Finals (lost to Pistons 0–4)
- Stats at Basketball Reference

Local media
- Television: KHJ-TV; Prime Ticket (Chick Hearn, Stu Lantz)
- Radio: KLAC (Chick Hearn, Stu Lantz)

The 1988–89 Los Angeles Lakers season was the 43rd season for the Los Angeles Lakers as a franchise, their 41st season in the National Basketball Association, and 29th in Los Angeles, California. This was also the final season for All-Star center Kareem Abdul-Jabbar.

== Season summary ==
=== Off-season ===
During the off-season, the Lakers signed free agent Orlando Woolridge. The Lakers entered the regular season as the 2-time defending NBA champions, having defeated the Detroit Pistons in a full seven-game series in the 1988 NBA Finals.

=== Regular season ===
With the addition of Woolridge, the Lakers got off to a fast start by winning 15 of their first 18 games of the regular season, which included a seven-game winning streak between November and December, and later on holding a 32–15 record at the All-Star break. The team posted a six-game winning streak in March, and won their final five games of the season. The Lakers finished in first place in the Pacific Division with a 57–25 record, and earned the first seed in the Western Conference; the team qualified for the NBA playoffs for the 13th consecutive year.

Magic Johnson averaged 22.5 points, 7.9 rebounds, 12.8 assists and 1.8 steals per game, and was named the NBA Most Valuable Player of the Year, and was also named to the All-NBA First Team, while James Worthy averaged 20.5 points, 6.0 rebounds, 3.6 assists and 1.3 steals per game, and Byron Scott provided the team with 19.6 points and 1.5 steals per game. In addition, A.C. Green provided with 13.3 points and 9.0 rebounds per game, and was named to the NBA All-Defensive Second Team, and Abdul-Jabbar contributed 10.1 points, 4.5 rebounds and 1.1 blocks per game. Off the bench, Woolridge averaged 9.7 points and 3.6 rebounds per game, while Mychal Thompson provided with 9.2 points and 5.8 rebounds per game, defensive guard Michael Cooper contributed 7.3 points and 3.9 assists per game, and led the Lakers with 80 three-point field goals, and Tony Campbell contributed 6.2 points per game.

During the NBA All-Star weekend at the Houston Astrodome in Houston, Texas, Johnson, Worthy and Abdul-Jabbar were all selected for the 1989 NBA All-Star Game, as members of the Western Conference All-Star team, while head coach Pat Riley was selected to coach the Western Conference. However, Johnson did not participate due to a hamstring injury, as Abdul-Jabbar was selected as his replacement; it would also be the final All-Star appearance for Abdul-Jabbar. Riley also finished tied in seventh place in Coach of the Year voting.

The Lakers finished sixth in the NBA in home-game attendance, with an attendance of 717,349 at the Great Western Forum during the regular season.

=== NBA playoffs ===
In the Western Conference First Round of the 1989 NBA playoffs, the Lakers faced off against the 8th–seeded Portland Trail Blazers, a team that featured All-Star guard Clyde Drexler, All-Star center Kevin Duckworth, and Terry Porter. The Lakers won the first two games over the Trail Blazers at home at the Great Western Forum, before winning Game 3 on the road, 116–108 at the Memorial Coliseum to win the series in a three-game sweep.

In the Western Conference Semi-finals, the team faced off against the 4th–seeded Seattle SuperSonics, who were led by All-Star guard Dale Ellis, All-Star forward Xavier McDaniel, and second-year forward Derrick McKey. After winning their first two games over the SuperSonics at the Great Western Forum, the Lakers won the next two games on the road, which included a Game 4 win over the SuperSonics at the Seattle Center Coliseum, 97–95 to win the series in a four-game sweep.

In the Western Conference Finals, the Lakers then faced off against the 3rd–seeded Phoenix Suns, who were led by the trio of All-Star forward Tom Chambers, Sixth Man of the Year, Eddie Johnson, and second-year star, and Most Improved Player of the Year, Kevin Johnson. The Lakers won the first two games over the Suns at the Great Western Forum, and then won the next two games on the road, including a Game 4 win over the Suns at the Arizona Veterans Memorial Coliseum, 122–117 to complete another four-game series sweep, and advance to the NBA Finals for the third consecutive year.

In the 1989 NBA Finals, The Lakers once again faced off against the top–seeded Detroit Pistons, who were led by the trio of All-Star guard Isiah Thomas, Joe Dumars and Bill Laimbeer, and who they defeated in last year's NBA Finals in a hard-fought seven-game series. However, after injuries to their starting backcourt of Magic Johnson and Scott, the Lakers lost the first two games to the Pistons on the road at The Palace of Auburn Hills, and then lost their next two home games, including a Game 4 loss to the Pistons at the Great Western Forum, 105–97, despite a 40-point performance from Worthy. The Lakers lost the series in a four-game sweep, as the Pistons won their first ever NBA championship in franchise history. After the Finals concluded, Abdul-Jabbar announced his retirement at the age of 42, and after twenty seasons in the NBA.

=== Aftermath ===
Following the season, Campbell signed as a free agent with the Minnesota Timberwolves expansion team. The 1988–89 season marked an end to a run of eight consecutive Western Conference Finals appearances for the Lakers, the most since the 1968–69 Boston Celtics, as in the following season, the Lakers would lose in the Conference Semi-finals to the Phoenix Suns in five games.

== Draft picks ==
Round	Pick	Player	Position	Nationality	College
1	25	David Rivers	PG	United States	Notre Dame

== Roster ==
1988–89 Los Angeles Lakers roster
Players

Pos.	No.	Player	Height	Weight	DOB	From
C	33	Kareem Abdul-Jabbar	7 ft 2 in (2.18 m)	225 lb (102 kg)	1947–04–16	UCLA
F	19	Tony Campbell	6 ft 7 in (2.01 m)	215 lb (98 kg)	1962–05–07	Ohio State
G	21	Michael Cooper	6 ft 5 in (1.96 m)	170 lb (77 kg)	1956–04–15	New Mexico
F	45	A.C. Green	6 ft 9 in (2.06 m)	220 lb (100 kg)	1963–10–04	Oregon State
G	32	Magic Johnson	6 ft 9 in (2.06 m)	215 lb (98 kg)	1959–08–14	Michigan State
F	3	Jeff Lamp	6 ft 6 in (1.98 m)	195 lb (88 kg)	1959–03–09	Virginia
C	31	Mark McNamara	6 ft 11 in (2.11 m)	235 lb (107 kg)	1959–06–08	California
G	14	David Rivers	6 ft 0 in (1.83 m)	180 lb (82 kg)	1965–01–20	Notre Dame
G	00, 4	Byron Scott	6 ft 3 in (1.91 m)	195 lb (88 kg)	1961–03–28	Arizona State
C	43	Mychal Thompson	6 ft 10 in (2.08 m)	226 lb (103 kg)	1955–01–30	University of Minnesota
F	0	Orlando Woolridge	6 ft 9 in (2.06 m)	215 lb (98 kg)	1959–12–16	Notre Dame
F	42	James Worthy	6 ft 9 in (2.06 m)	225 lb (102 kg)	1961–02–27	North Carolina

Coaches
Head coach
- Pat Riley
Assistant(s)
- Bill Bertka
- Randy Pfund

Legend
- (DP) Unsigned draft pick
- (FA) Free agent
- (S) Suspended
- Injured

== Regular season ==
=== Season standings ===
Pacific Division	W	L	PCT	GB	Home	Road	Div
y-Los Angeles Lakers	57	25	.695	–	35–6	22–19	25–9
x-Phoenix Suns	55	27	.671	2	35–6	20–21	23–11
x-Seattle SuperSonics	47	35	.573	10	31–10	16–25	20–14
x-Golden State Warriors	43	39	.524	14	29–12	14–27	15–19
x-Portland Trail Blazers	39	43	.476	18	28–13	11–30	17–17
Sacramento Kings	27	55	.329	30	21–20	6–35	12–22
Los Angeles Clippers	21	61	.256	36	17–24	4–37	7–27

#	Western Conference				
#	Team	W	L	PCT	GB
1	c-Los Angeles Lakers	57	25	.695	–
2	y-Utah Jazz	51	31	.622	6
3	x-Phoenix Suns	55	27	.671	2
4	x-Seattle SuperSonics	47	35	.573	10
5	x-Houston Rockets	45	37	.549	12
6	x-Denver Nuggets	44	38	.537	13
7	x-Golden State Warriors	43	39	.524	14
8	x-Portland Trail Blazers	39	43	.476	18
9	Dallas Mavericks	38	44	.463	19
10	Sacramento Kings	27	55	.329	30
11	San Antonio Spurs	21	61	.256	36
12	Los Angeles Clippers	21	61	.256	36
13	Miami Heat	15	67	.183	42

== Game log ==
=== Regular season ===
1988–89 game log
Total: 57–25 (home: 35–6; road: 22–19)
November: 10–3 (home: 4–0; road: 6–3)

Game	Date	Team	Score	High points	High rebounds	High assists	Location Attendance	Record
1	November 4	@ Dallas	W 116-113	James Worthy (25)	Johnson & Worthy (6)	Magic Johnson (14)	Reunion Arena; 17,007	1–0
2	November 5	@ San Antonio	L 107-122	Magic Johnson (21)	Kareem Abdul-Jabbar (12)	Magic Johnson (14)	HemisFair Arena; 15,861	1-1
3	November 8	@ Golden State	W 114–102	Scott (23)	Green, Johnson, Thompson (7)	Johnson (18)	Oakland–Alameda County Coliseum Arena; 15,025	2–1
4	November 9	Denver	W 128-110	Byron Scott (33)	A.C. Green (9)	Magic Johnson (19)	Great Western Forum; 17,505	3–1
5	November 11	Seattle	W 114–103	Scott (29)	Johnson (9)	Johnson (16)	The Forum; 17,505	4–1
6	November 15	@ Denver	W 148-146 (2OT)	James Worthy (33)	Mychal Thompson (10)	Magic Johnson (13)	McNichols Sports Arena; 15,198	5–1
7	November 17	@ Seattle	L 98–101	Johnson (28)	Johnson, Thompson (10)	Jhnson (6)	Seattle Center Coliseum; 14,576	5–2
8	November 18	Portland	W 106-105	Magic Johnson (26)	Kareem Abdul-Jabbar (8)	Magic Johnson (9)	Great Western Forum; 17,505	6–2
9	November 22	@ New York	W 110–98	Worthy (29)	Johnson (12)	Johnson (13)	Madison Square Garden; 19,591	7–2
10	November 23	@ Miami	W 138-91	Orlando Woolridge (22)	Tony Campbell (9)	Magic Johnson (17)	Miami Arena; 15,008	8–2
11	November 26	@ Detroit	L 99–102	Scott (20)	Green (14)	Johnson (8)	The Palace of Auburn Hills; 21,454	8–3
12	November 28	@ Philadelphia	W 109-104	Magic Johnson (32)	Magic Johnson (11)	Magic Johnson (20)	The Spectrum; 18,168	9–3
13	November 30	Seattle	W 110–106	Johnson (40)	Thompson (11)	Johnson (10)	The Forum; 17,505	10–3

December: 9–7 (home: 6–0; road: 3–7)

Game	Date	Team	Score	High points	High rebounds	High assists	Location Attendance	Record
14	December 2	Utah	W 113-92	Byron Scott (32)	Magic Johnson (12)	Magic Johnson (15)	Great Western Forum; 17,505	11–3
15	December 4	Washington	W 119-112 (OT)	Magic Johnson (29)	Mychal Thompson (9)	Magic Johnson (17)	Great Western Forum; 17,505	12–3
16	December 6	@ L.A. Clippers	W 111-102	Magic Johnson (25)	Mychal Thompson (11)	Magic Johnson (21)	Los Angeles Memorial Sports Arena; 15,352	13–3
17	December 7	Phoenix	W 125–111	Scott (27)	Johnson (12)	Johnson (18)	Great Western Forum; 17,353	14–3
18	December 10	@ Indiana	W 112-105	Magic Johnson (32)	Green & Johnson (11)	Magic Johnson (13)	Market Square Arena; 16,912	15–3
19	December 11	@ Milwaukee	L 94–95	Worthy (21)	Green (6)	Johnson (12)	Bradley Center; 18,633	15–4
20	December 13	@ Cleveland	W 111-102	Magic Johnson (31)	Magic Johnson (12)	Magic Johnson (13)	Richfield Coliseum; 20,041	16–4
21	December 14	@ New Jersey	L 113-118 (OT)	Magic Johnson (35)	A.C. Green (10)	Magic Johnson (9)	Brendan Byrne Arena; 20,049	16–5
22	December 16	@ Boston	L 96-110	Magic Johnson (31)	A.C. Green (16)	Magic Johnson (7)	Boston Garden; 14,890	16–6
23	December 18	@ Washington	L 110-115	James Worthy (31)	James Worthy (7)	Magic Johnson (8)	Capital Centre; 18,643	16–7
24	December 20	@ Chicago	L 103–116	Johnson (31)	Thompson (9)	Johnson (12)	Chicago Stadium; 18,676	16–8
25	December 23	Sacramento	W 120-102	Magic Johnson (27)	A.C. Green (11)	Magic Johnson (15)	Great Western Forum; 17,505	17–8
26	December 25	@ Utah	L 87-101	Johnson & Worthy (18)	Mychal Thompson (9)	Magic Johnson (10)	Salt Palace; 12,444	17–9
27	December 26	@ Phoenix	L 96–111	Scott (24)	Green (11)	Johnson (8)	Arizona Veterans Memorial Coliseum; 14,471	17–10
28	December 28	Philadelphia	W 128-123	Johnson & Worthy (26)	Magic Johnson (10)	Magic Johnson (18)	Great Western Forum; 17,505	18–10
29	December 30	L.A. Clippers	W 124-109	Magic Johnson (34)	James Worthy (11)	Magic Johnson (14)	Great Western Forum; 17,505	19–10

January: 11–3 (home: 8–1; road: 3–2)

Game	Date	Team	Score	High points	High rebounds	High assists	Location Attendance	Record
30	January 3	@ Seattle	L 106–116	Green (27)	Green (11)	Johnson (9)	Seattle Center Coliseum; 14,645	19–11
31	January 4	Portland	W 133-120	Mychal Thompson (27)	Green & Thompson (11)	Magic Johnson (15)	Great Western Forum; 17,505	20–11
32	January 6	Miami	W 118-86	Orlando Woolridge (29)	A.C. Green (9)	Magic Johnson (11)	Great Western Forum; 17,505	21–11
33	January 8	San Antonio	W 126-96	3 players tied (17)	3 players tied (8)	Magic Johnson (17)	Great Western Forum; 17,505	22–11
34	January 10	@ Sacramento	L 97-106	Johnson & Worthy (22)	A.C. Green (12)	Magic Johnson (12)	ARCO Arena; 16,517	22–12
35	January 13	Cleveland	W 116-95	Magic Johnson (26)	A.C. Green (15)	Magic Johnson (11)	Great Western Forum; 17,505	23–12
36	January 15	@ L.A. Clippers	W 116-95	Byron Scott (28)	Green & Johnson (9)	Magic Johnson (12)	Los Angeles Memorial Sports Arena; 15,352	24–12
37	January 16	Houston	W 124-113	James Worthy (26)	Magic Johnson (13)	Magic Johnson (18)	Great Western Forum; 17,505	25–12
38	January 18	L.A. Clippers	W 111-90	Magic Johnson (19)	James Worthy (15)	Magic Johnson (13)	Great Western Forum; 17,301	26–12
39	January 20	Dallas	W 115-99	Magic Johnson (30)	James Worthy (10)	Magic Johnson (11)	Great Western Forum; 17,505	27–12
40	January 24	New York	L 117–122	Johnson, Worthy (26)	Worthy (14)	Johnson (11)	Great Western Forum; 17,505	27–13
41	January 27	Charlotte	W 114-97	A.C. Green (24)	A.C. Green (11)	Cooper & Johnson (10)	Great Western Forum; 17,505	28–13
42	January 29	@ Dallas	W 118-93	A.C. Green (25)	James Worthy (12)	Magic Johnson (9)	Reunion Arena; 17,007	29–13
43	January 31	@ Houston	W 125-114	A.C. Green (24)	Magic Johnson (11)	Magic Johnson (10)	The Summit; 16,611	30–13

February: 7–4 (home: 5–2; road: 2–2)

Game	Date	Team	Score	High points	High rebounds	High assists	Location Attendance	Record
44	February 1	@ Phoenix	L 97–114	Johnson (17)	Johnson (12)	Johnson (9)	Arizona Veterans Memorial Coliseum; 14,471	30–14
45	February 3	Portland	W 140-129	Magic Johnson (29)	A.C. Green (11)	Magic Johnson (8)	Great Western Forum; 17,505	31–14
46	February 5	New Jersey	W 134-116	Magic Johnson (27)	Kareem Abdul-Jabbar (9)	Magic Johnson (13)	Great Western Forum; 17,505	32–14
47	February 8	Golden State	L 118–121	Worthy (30)	Johnson, Woolridge (8)	Johnson (12)	Great Western Forum; 17,505	32–15
All-Star Break
48	February 14	Detroit	L 103–111	Worthy (33)	Green (11)	Cooper (8)	Great Western Forum; 17,505	32–16
49	February 16	@ Portland	W 110-101	James Worthy (28)	Mychal Thompson (12)	Michael Cooper (7)	Memorial Coliseum; 12,848	33–16
50	February 19	Boston	W 119-110	Byron Scott (35)	A.C. Green (11)	Michael Cooper (13)	Great Western Forum; 17,505	34–16
51	February 20	@ Sacramento	W 100-97	Byron Scott (33)	A.C. Green (10)	Cooper & Worthy (7)	ARCO Arena; 16,517	35–16
52	February 22	@ Utah	L 79-105	Byron Scott (14)	A.C. Green (9)	Michael Cooper (7)	Salt Palace; 12,444	35–17
53	February 24	Sacramento	W 115-103	Byron Scott (31)	A.C. Green (15)	Magic Johnson (8)	Great Western Forum; 17,505	36–17
54	February 26	Phoenix	W 134–122	Scott (29)	Green (11)	Johnson (19)	Great Western Forum; 17,505	37–17

March: 11–4 (home: 6–2; road: 5–2)

Game	Date	Team	Score	High points	High rebounds	High assists	Location Attendance	Record
55	March 1	Golden State	W 142–121	Johnson (35)	Johnspn (14)	Johnson (8)	Great Western Forum; 17,505	38–17
56	March 3	Indiana	W 139-117	A.C. Green (24)	A.C. Green (11)	Magic Johnson (16)	Great Western Forum; 17,505	39–17
57	March 5	@ Houston	L 83-88	James Worthy (19)	A.C. Green (9)	Magic Johnson (15)	The Summit; 16,611	39–18
58	March 7	@ Atlanta	W 106-97	James Worthy (24)	A.C. Green (13)	Magic Johnson (15)	Omni Coliseum; 16,371	40–18
59	March 8	@ Miami	W 127-87	Tony Campbell (19)	Mark McNamara (13)	Magic Johnson (10)	Miami Arena; 15,008	41–18
60	March 10	@ Charlotte	W 123-90	Byron Scott (25)	A.C. Green (15)	Magic Johnson (14)	Charlotte Coliseum; 23,388	42–18
61	March 12	@ Golden State	W 126–115	Scott (32)	Abdul-Jabbar (11)	Johnson (10)	Oakland–Alameda County Coliseum Arena; 15,025	43–18
62	March 13	Houston	W 97-96	Kareem Abdul-Jabbar (21)	Kareem Abdul-Jabbar (13)	Magic Johnson (11)	Great Western Forum; 17,505	44–18
63	March 17	Dallas	W 106-103	Magic Johnson (31)	A.C. Green (15)	Magic Johnson (13)	Great Western Forum; 17,505	45–18
64	March 19	Atlanta	L 111-113	Magic Johnson (29)	A.C. Green (14)	Magic Johnson (13)	Great Western Forum; 17,505	45–19
65	March 21	Chicago	L 103–104	Johnson (20)	Johnson (8)	Johnson (12)	Great Western Forum; 17,505	45–20
66	March 23	@ Sacramento	W 115-92	Magic Johnson (25)	A.C. Green (15)	Magic Johnson (14)	ARCO Arena; 16,517	46–20
67	March 26	Phoenix	W 118–116	Johnson (34)	Green (12)	Johnson (18)	Great Western Forum; 17,505	47–20
68	March 28	@ Phoenix	L 104–127	Worthy (24)	Worthy (11)	Johnson (14)	Arizona Veterans Memorial Coliseum; 14,471	47–21
69	March 30	San Antonio	W 138-98	Byron Scott (35)	Magic Johnson (9)	Magic Johnson (10)	Great Western Forum; 17,505	48–21

April: 9–4 (home: 6–1; road: 3–3)

Game	Date	Team	Score	High points	High rebounds	High assists	Location Attendance	Record
70	April 1	@ Denver	L 108-114 (OT)	James Worthy (25)	Magic Johnson (17)	Magic Johnson (15)	McNichols Sports Arena; 17,022	48–22
71	April 2	Milwaukee	W 118–117	Scott (32)	Green (10)	Johnson (11)	Great Western Forum; 17,505	49–22
72	April 4	@ Seattle	W 115–97	Green (33)	Green (10)	Johnson (18)	Seattle Center Coliseum; 14,810	50–22
73	April 7	Utah	L 97-99	Johnson & Worthy (24)	James Worthy (9)	Magic Johnson (10)	Great Western Forum; 17,505	50–23
74	April 8	@ Golden State	L 116-122	Johnson (24)	Johnson (9)	Johnson (12)	Oakland–Alameda County Coliseum Arena; 15,025	50–24
75	April 10	L.A. Clippers	W 133-116	Magic Johnson (24)	A.C. Green (9)	Magic Johnson (13)	Great Western Forum; 17,505	51–24
76	April 12	@ San Antonio	W 107-100	Magic Johnson (24)	A.C. Green (12)	Magic Johnson (7)	HemisFair Arena; 15,861	52–24
77	April 15	@ L.A. Clippers	L 107-119	Magic Johnson (26)	A.C. Green (8)	Magic Johnson (13)	Los Angeles Memorial Sports Arena; 15,352	52–25
78	April 16	Miami	W 121-108	Magic Johnson (24)	Mychal Thompson (9)	Magic Johnson (7)	Great Western Forum; 17,505	53–25
79	April 18	Denver	W 142-118	James Worthy (26)	Magic Johnson (17)	Magic Johnson (17)	Great Western Forum; 17,505	54–25
80	April 20	Sacramento	W 118-115	James Worthy (38)	A.C. Green (9)	Magic Johnson (16)	Great Western Forum; 17,505	55–25
81	April 21	@ Portland	W 121-114	Magic Johnson (23)	A.C. Green (12)	Magic Johnson (10)	Memorial Coliseum; 12,880	56–25
82	April 23	Seattle	W 121–117	Johnson (29)	Green (10)	Johnson (21)	Great Western Forum; 17,505	57–25

1988–89 schedule

=== Playoffs ===
1989 playoff game log
Total: 11–4 (home: 6–2; road: 5–2)
Western Conference First Round: 3–0 (home: 2–0; road: 1–0)

Game	Date	Team	Score	High points	High rebounds	High assists	Location Attendance	Series
1	April 27	Portland	W 128–108	Magic Johnson (30)	Abdul-Jabbar & Scott (8)	Magic Johnson (16)	Great Western Forum; 17,505	1–0
2	April 30	Portland	W 113–105	Magic Johnson (35)	A.C. Green (13)	Magic Johnson (12)	Great Western Forum; 17,505	2–0
3	May 3	@ Portland	W 116–108	Byron Scott (25)	A.C. Green (13)	Magic Johnson (7)	Memorial Coliseum; 12,880	3–0

Western Conference Semifinals: 4–0 (home: 2–0; road: 2–0)

Game	Date	Team	Score	High points	High rebounds	High assists	Location Attendance	Series
1	May 7	Seattle	W 113–102	Worthy (28)	Worthy (12)	Johnson (14)	Great Western Forum; 17,505	1–0
2	May 10	Seattle	W 130–108	Worthy (30)	Green (8)	Johnson (12)	Great Western Forum; 17,505	2–0
3	May 12	@ Seattle	W 91–86	Worthy (20)	Johnson (9)	Johnson (14)	Seattle Center Coliseum; 14,541	3–0
4	May 14	@ Seattle	W 97–95	Worthy (33)	Green (10)	Johnson (9)	Seattle Center Coliseum; 14,006	4–0

Western Conference Finals: 4–0 (home: 2–0; road: 2–0)

Game	Date	Team	Score	High points	High rebounds	High assists	Location Attendance	Series
1	May 20	Phoenix	W 127–119	Worthy (32)	Green (10)	Johnson (12)	Great Western Forum; 17,505	1–0
2	May 23	Phoenix	W 101–95	Scott (30)	Johnson (9)	Johnson (14)	Great Western Forum; 17,505	2–0
3	May 26	@ Phoenix	W 110–107	Worthy (29)	Worthy (12)	Johnson (11)	Arizona Veterans Memorial Coliseum; 14,471	3–0
4	May 28	@ Phoenix	W 122–117	Scott (35)	Green (11)	Johnson (20)	Arizona Veterans Memorial Coliseum; 14,471	4–0

NBA Finals: 0–4 (home: 0–2; road: 0–2)

Game	Date	Team	Score	High points	High rebounds	High assists	Location Attendance	Series
1	June 6	@ Detroit	L 97–109	Johnson, Worthy (17)	Green (8)	Johnson (14)	The Palace of Auburn Hills; 21,454	0–1
2	June 8	@ Detroit	L 105–108	Cooper, Worthy (19)	Green (9)	Johnson (9)	The Palace of Auburn Hills; 21,454	0–2
3	June 11	Detroit	L 110–114	Worthy (26)	Abdul-Jabbar (13)	Cooper (13)	Great Western Forum; 17,505	0–3
4	June 13	Detroit	L 97–105	Worthy (40)	Green (12)	Cooper (9)	Great Western Forum; 17,505	0–4

1989 schedule

- On June 28, 1989, after twenty professional seasons, Abdul-Jabbar announced his retirement. On his "retirement tour" he received standing ovations at all the games, home and away.

== Awards and honors ==
- A.C. Green, NBA All-Defensive Second Team
- Magic Johnson, NBA Most Valuable Player
- Magic Johnson, NBA All-First Team
