= Rod Higgins =

American basketball player (born 1960)

Personal information
- Born: January 31, 1960 (age 66) Monroe, Louisiana, U.S.
- Listed height: 6 ft 7 in (2.01 m)
- Listed weight: 200 lb (91 kg)

Career information
- High school: Thornton Township (Harvey, Illinois)
- College: Fresno State (1978–1982)
- NBA draft: 1982: 2nd round, 31st overall pick
- Drafted by: Chicago Bulls
- Playing career: 1982–1994
- Position: Small forward / power forward
- Number: 22, 55, 21, 23, 32
- Coaching career: 1994–2000

Career history

Playing
- 1982–1985: Chicago Bulls
- 1985: Seattle SuperSonics
- 1985–1986: Tampa Bay Thrillers
- 1986: San Antonio Spurs
- 1986: New Jersey Nets
- 1986: Chicago Bulls
- 1986–1992: Golden State Warriors
- 1992–1993: Sacramento Kings
- 1992: Olympiacos
- 1993–1994: Cleveland Cavaliers
- 1994: Golden State Warriors

Coaching
- 1994–2000: Golden State Warriors (assistant)

Career highlights
- CBA champion (1986); CBA Playoff/Finals MVP (1986); 2× First-team All-PCAA (1981, 1982)

Career NBA statistics
- Points: 7,011 (9.0 ppg)
- Rebounds: 2,819 (3.6 rpg)
- Assists: 1,254 (1.6 apg)
- Stats at NBA.com
- Stats at Basketball Reference

Roderick Dwayne Higgins (born January 31, 1960) is an American former professional basketball player who formerly served as president of basketball operations for the National Basketball Association's Charlotte Hornets. He is also the father of former Charlotte Bobcats point guard Cory Higgins.

A 6'7" forward from California State University, Fresno, Higgins played 13 seasons (1982–1994) in the NBA as a member of the Chicago Bulls, the Seattle SuperSonics, the San Antonio Spurs, the New Jersey Nets, the Golden State Warriors, the Sacramento Kings, and the Cleveland Cavaliers. He averaged 9.0 points per game and 3.6 rebounds per game during his NBA career.

Higgins played for the Tampa Bay Thrillers of the Continental Basketball Association (CBA) during the 1985–86 season and won the CBA championship. He was selected as the CBA Playoff/Finals Most Valuable Player.

After his playing career ended Higgins served as an assistant coach with the Warriors until 2000 when he was named assistant general manager of the Washington Wizards. He was re-hired by the Warriors on May 20, 2004, joining former teammate Chris Mullin in the team's front office.

On May 31, 2007, he was hired as the second general manager of the Charlotte Hornets (then the Charlotte Bobcats), replacing Bernie Bickerstaff. In 2011, he became the team's president of basketball operations after Rich Cho was hired as general manager. On June 13, 2014, Higgins stepped down as President of Basketball Operations for the Charlotte Hornets.

Higgins was the first professional basketball player to play for four NBA teams in one season. (Note: There were four previous instances of professional basketballers playing on four NBA or ABA teams in one season: Steve Chubin (twice), Ken Wilburn, and Rich Johnson. However, both of Chubin's four-team seasons (1968–69 and 1969–70) exclusively involved the ABA as he never played in the NBA, and both Wilburn (1968–69) and Johnson (1970–71) played for three ABA teams and one NBA team in their respective seasons.) In the 1985–86 season, he played for the Seattle Supersonics, the San Antonio Spurs, the New Jersey Nets, and the Chicago Bulls.

== Career playing statistics ==
Legend
GP	Games played	GS	Games started	MPG	Minutes per game
FG%	Field goal percentage	3P%	3-point field goal percentage	FT%	Free throw percentage
RPG	Rebounds per game	APG	Assists per game	SPG	Steals per game
BPG	Blocks per game	PPG	Points per game	**Bold**	Career high
*	Led the league

=== NBA ===
Source

=== Regular season ===
Year	Team	GP	GS	MPG	FG%	3P%	FT%	RPG	APG	SPG	BPG	PPG
1982–83	Chicago	**82**	42	26.8	.448	.317	.792	4.5	2.1	.8	.8	10.3
1983–84	Chicago	78	6	20.2	.447	.045	.724	2.6	1.5	.6	.4	6.4
1984–85	Chicago	68	5	13.9	.441	.270	.667	2.2	1.1	.3	.2	4.5
1985–86	Seattle	12	0	7.8	.333	.250	.600	1.0	.5	.2	.1	1.8
1985–86	San Antonio	11	0	11.6	.450	.000	.688	2.2	1.1	.2	.3	4.3
1985–86	New Jersey	2	0	14.5	.188	.000	–	4.0	.5	.5	**2.0**	3.0
1985–86	Chicago	5	0	16.2	.391	.000	.833	1.4	1.0	.8	.6	4.6
1986–87	Golden State	73	28	20.5	.519	.176	.833	3.2	1.3	.5	.3	8.6
1987–88	Golden State	68	**67**	**32.2**	**.526**	**.487**	.848	4.3	**2.8**	**1.0**	.5	**15.5**
1988–89	Golden State	81	1	23.3	.476	.393	.821	4.6	2.0	.5	.5	10.6
1989–90	Golden State	**82***	22	24.3	.481	.347	.821	**5.1**	1.6	.6	.6	11.1
1990–91	Golden State	**82***	9	24.7	.463	.332	.819	4.3	1.4	.6	.5	9.5
1991–92	Golden State	25	6	21.4	.412	.347	.814	3.4	.9	.6	.5	10.2
1992–93	Sacramento	69	4	20.7	.412	.323	**.861**	2.8	1.7	.7	.4	8.3
1993–94	Cleveland	36	11	15.2	.436	.440	.738	2.3	1.0	.7	.4	5.4
1994–95	Golden State	5	2	9.2	.250	.167	.750	1.4	.6	.2	.2	2.0
Career		779	203	22.1	.465	.342	.808	3.6	1.6	.6	.5	9.0

=== Playoffs ===
Year	Team	GP	GS	MPG	FG%	3P%	FT%	RPG	APG	SPG	BPG	PPG
1985	Chicago	1	0	1.0	–	–	–	.0	.0	.0	.0	.0
1987	Golden State	**10**	**8**	17.7	.391	**1.000**	.667	2.1	1.2	1.1	.6	4.3
1989	Golden State	8	7	**33.4**	**.488**	.286	.853	**7.4**	**2.5**	**1.6**	**.9**	**14.9**
1991	Golden State	9	3	23.8	.426	.308	.821	3.2	2.0	.2	**.9**	9.2
1992	Golden State	2	2	8.5	.400	.000	**1.000**	.0	.5	.5	.0	3.0
1994	Cleveland	3	2	19.0	.364	.286	.500	1.3	1.3	.3	.3	3.7
Career		33	22	22.2	.439	.296	.813	3.4	1.7	.8	.7	7.9

== NBA GM record ==
Team	Year	Regular season					Postseason	
Team	Year	Won	Lost	Win %	Finish	Won	Lost	Result
GS	2004–05	34	48	.414	5th in Pacific Division	–	–	Missed playoffs
GS	2005–06	34	48	.414	5th in Pacific Division	–	–	Missed playoffs
GS	2006–07	42	40	.512	3rd in Pacific Division	5	6	Lost In Second Round
CHA	2007–08	32	50	.390	4th in Southeast Division	–	–	Missed playoffs
CHA	2008–09	35	47	.426	4th in Southeast Division	–	–	Missed playoffs
CHA	2009–10	44	38	.537	4th in Southeast Division	0	4	Lost In First Round
CHA	2010–11	34	48	.414	4th in Southeast Division	–	–	Missed playoffs
Total		256	313	.449	0 Division; Titles	5	10	0 Championships
