= Mitch Richmond =

American basketball player (born 1965)

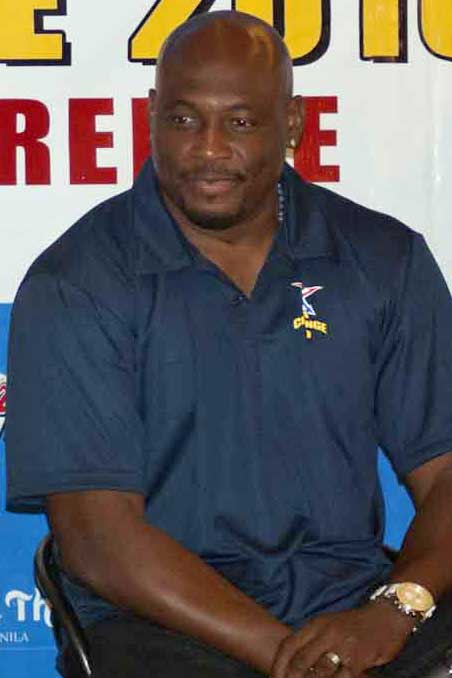
- Richmond in 2010

Personal information
- Born: June 30, 1965 (age 61) Fort Lauderdale, Florida, U.S.
- Listed height: 6 ft 5 in (1.96 m)
- Listed weight: 220 lb (100 kg)

Career information
- High school: Boyd Anderson (Lauderdale Lakes, Florida)
- College: Moberly Area CC (1984–1986); Kansas State (1986–1988)
- NBA draft: 1988: 1st round, 5th overall pick
- Drafted by: Golden State Warriors
- Playing career: 1988–2002
- Position: Shooting guard
- Number: 23, 2
- Coaching career: 2015–2019

Career history

Playing
- 1988–1991: Golden State Warriors
- 1991–1998: Sacramento Kings
- 1998–2001: Washington Wizards
- 2001–2002: Los Angeles Lakers

Career highlights
- NBA champion (2002); 6× NBA All-Star (1993–1998); NBA All-Star Game MVP (1995); 3× All-NBA Second Team (1994, 1995, 1997); 2× All-NBA Third Team (1996, 1998); NBA Rookie of the Year (1989); NBA All-Rookie First Team (1989); No. 2 retired by Sacramento Kings; Consensus second-team All-American (1988); No. 23 retired by Kansas State Wildcats

Career statistics
- Points: 20,497 (21.0 ppg)
- Rebounds: 3,801 (3.9 rpg)
- Assists: 3,398 (3.5 apg)
- Stats at NBA.com
- Stats at Basketball Reference
- Basketball Hall of Fame
Medals
Men's basketball
Representing United States
Olympic Games
Gold medal – first place	1996 Atlanta	Men's basketball
Bronze medal – third place	1988 Seoul	Men's basketball
Universiade
Silver medal – second place	1987 Zagreb	Men's basketball

Mitchell James Richmond III (born June 30, 1965) is an American former professional basketball player. He played collegiately at Moberly Area Community College and Kansas State University. He was a six-time NBA All-Star, a five-time All-NBA Team member, and a former NBA Rookie of the Year. In 976 NBA games, Richmond averaged 21.0 points per game and 3.5 assists per game. Richmond was voted into the Naismith Memorial Basketball Hall of Fame in 2014. His jersey No. 2 was retired in his honor by the Sacramento Kings, for whom he played seven seasons.

== Early life ==
Mitchell James Richmond III was born on June 30, 1965, in Fort Lauderdale, Florida. He attended Boyd H. Anderson High School in Lauderdale Lakes, Florida, where he excelled in basketball.

== College career ==
Richmond began his college career playing for the Moberly Area Community College Greyhounds. He scored 1,023 points from 1984 to 1986, before joining the Kansas State Wildcats.

One of the most recognizable players in Kansas State history, Mitch Richmond was a two-year letterman for head coach Lon Kruger from 1986 to 1988. He helped guide the Wildcats to a 45–20 (.692) record, including a pair of NCAA Tournament appearances and a trip to the 1988 NCAA Midwest Regional Final. His 1,327 points are the most by a player in a two-year career.

== Professional career ==
=== Golden State Warriors (1988–1991) ===
Richmond was drafted 5th overall in the 1988 NBA draft by the Golden State Warriors, following two years at Kansas State, where he averaged 20 points per game, and two years at Moberly Area Community College.

Richmond captured the NBA Rookie of the Year Award in the 1988–89 season, after averaging 22 points per game for the Warriors. He was a key part of Don Nelson's fast-paced offense, focusing on Richmond and teammates Tim Hardaway and Chris Mullin which was dubbed "Run TMC" (the initials of the players' first names and a play on the name of the popular rap group Run-DMC). In addition to the shooting he provided, he complemented Hardaway's passing and fast break skills and Mullin's shooting skills by slashing to the hoop as part of the Warriors' attack.

=== Sacramento Kings (1991–1998) ===
Richmond averaged over 22 points a game his first three NBA seasons with Golden State, On November 1, 1991, he was traded (along with Les Jepsen) to the Sacramento Kings during the 1991–92 season in exchange for the rights to Billy Owens. Staying with the Kings until 1998, Richmond was the team's leading scorer in each of his seven seasons there, averaging no fewer than 21.9 points a game each season. Between 1993 and 1998, Richmond was a fixture on the Western Conference's All-Star team, and he won MVP honors at the All-Star Game in Phoenix, in 1995. In the middle of his prime, Richmond was selected to the United States' Olympic team (Dream Team III), earning a gold medal in Atlanta. During his prime, Richmond was recognized as one of basketball's all-time best pure shooters.

=== Washington Wizards (1998–2001) ===
Richmond was traded by the Kings, along with Otis Thorpe, to the Washington Wizards for Chris Webber in May 1998, a move that keyed the Kings' transformation from perennial doormat to an elite title contender. However, things did not work out as well for Richmond. In three years with the Wizards, he lost a lot of the shooting touch he displayed as a King, and his days as a regular were numbered after missing half of the 2000–01 season. Richmond's departure from Washington coincided with the Wizards signing Richmond's perennial rival at the shooting guard position, Michael Jordan.

=== Los Angeles Lakers (2001–2002) ===
Richmond signed as a free agent with the Los Angeles Lakers, where he played the final year of his career. Playing strictly off the bench, he averaged 4 points a game. He earned an NBA championship ring with the Lakers in 2002 but played sparingly in the postseason, logging 4 minutes overall. In game 4 of the finals, just seconds after making the last basket of his career, Richmond dribbled out the clock to win the title with the Lakers.

== National team career ==
Before coming to the NBA, he played for the U.S. national team at the 1988 Summer Olympics in Seoul, South Korea, winning the bronze medal. He became a member of the team again at the 1996 Summer Olympics in Atlanta, Georgia, U.S. and won the gold medal along with David Robinson, who was also on the U.S. men's national basketball team in 1988.

In August 2010, Richmond played in the NBA Asia Challenge 2010 at Araneta Coliseum in Manila, an exhibition game which pitted NBA legends and NBA Development League players against Philippine Basketball Association stars and legends.

== Personal life ==
Mitch Richmond is the cousin of NFL defensive back Lardarius Webb.

Richmond and his wife Julie have three sons, Phillip, Jerin, and Shane Richmond, and he has a daughter, Tearra Gates, with Teala Jones. Shane died at age 20 in 2019 with no cause disclosed.

Phillip played basketball as a walk-on for the Oregon Ducks from 2014 to 2016.

== Halls of Fame ==
Richmond was elected to the Naismith Memorial Basketball Hall of Fame in 2014, and inducted into the Bay Area Sports Hall of Fame in 2016.

== NBA career statistics ==
Legend
GP	Games played	GS	Games started	MPG	Minutes per game
FG%	Field goal percentage	3P%	3-point field goal percentage	FT%	Free throw percentage
RPG	Rebounds per game	APG	Assists per game	SPG	Steals per game
BPG	Blocks per game	PPG	Points per game	**Bold**	Career high
†	Won an NBA championship	*	Led the league

=== Regular season ===
Year	Team	GP	GS	MPG	FG%	3P%	FT%	RPG	APG	SPG	BPG	PPG
1988–89	Golden State	79	79	34.4	.468	.367	.810	**5.9**	4.2	1.0	0.2	22.0
1989–90	Golden State	78	78	35.9	**.497**	.358	.866	4.6	2.9	1.3	0.3	22.1
1990–91	Golden State	77	77	**39.3**	.494	.348	.847	**5.9**	3.1	**1.6**	**0.4**	23.9
1991–92	Sacramento	80	80	38.7	.468	.384	.813	4.0	**5.1**	1.2	**0.4**	22.5
1992–93	Sacramento	45	45	38.4	.474	.369	.845	3.4	4.9	1.2	0.2	21.9
1993–94	Sacramento	78	78	37.1	.445	.407	.834	3.7	4.0	1.3	0.2	23.4
1994–95	Sacramento	**82***	**82***	38.7	.446	.368	.843	4.4	3.8	1.1	**0.4**	22.8
1995–96	Sacramento	81	81	36.4	.447	**.437**	.866	3.3	3.1	1.5	0.2	23.1
1996–97	Sacramento	81	81	38.6	.454	.428	.861	3.9	4.2	1.5	0.3	**25.9**
1997–98	Sacramento	70	70	36.7	.445	.389	.864	3.3	4.0	1.3	0.2	23.2
1998–99	Washington	50*	50*	38.2	.412	.317	.857	3.4	2.4	1.3	0.2	19.7
1999–00	Washington	74	69	32.4	.426	.386	.876	2.9	2.5	1.5	0.2	17.4
2000–01	Washington	37	30	32.9	.407	.338	.894	2.9	3.0	1.2	0.2	16.2
2001–02†	L.A. Lakers	64	2	11.1	.405	.290	**.955**	1.5	0.9	0.3	0.1	4.1
Career		976	902	35.2	.455	.388	.850	3.9	3.5	1.2	0.3	21.0
All-Star		5	1	22.0	.439	.500	.500	2.4	2.6	0.2	0.0	11.4

=== Playoffs ===
Year	Team	GP	GS	MPG	FG%	3P%	FT%	RPG	APG	SPG	BPG	PPG
1989	Golden State	8	8	39.3	.459	.188	.895	**7.3**	**4.4**	**1.8**	.1	20.1
1991	Golden State	**9**	**9**	**41.3**	.503	.333	**.958**	5.2	2.4	.6	**.7**	**22.3**
1996	Sacramento	4	4	36.5	.444	**.348**	.800	4.3	3.0	.8	.0	21.0
2002†	L.A. Lakers	2	0	2.0	**1.000**	.000	.500	.5	.0	.0	.0	1.5
Career		23	21	36.3	.479	.302	.869	5.3	3.0	1.0	.3	19.5

== Filmography ==
Year	Title	Role	Notes	Ref
2012	The Other Dream Team	Himself	Documentary about the Lithuania men's national basketball team at the 1992 Summer Olympics.	

== See also ==
- List of National Basketball Association career scoring leaders
- List of National Basketball Association rookie single-season scoring leaders
