= John Richmond (English footballer) =

English footballer (1938–2018)

Personal information
- Full name: John Frederick Richmond
- Date of birth: 17 September 1938
- Place of birth: Derby, England
- Date of death: August 2018 (aged 79)
- Place of death: Acton Trussell, England
- Position: Left-half

Youth career
- Derby Boys

Senior career*
Years	Team	Apps	(Gls)
- Derby Corinthians
1956–1963	Derby County	6	(0)
1963–1965	Chelmsford City	7	(0)
- * Club domestic league appearances and goals

John Frederick Richmond (17 September 1938 — August 2018) was an English footballer who played as a left-half.

== Career ==
In January 1956, Richmond signed for Derby County from local club Derby Corinthians. On 12 April 1958, Richmond made his debut for Derby in a 0–0 draw against Huddersfield Town. Richmond made five further league appearances for the club, with the majority of Richmond's time at the club spent playing for the reserves in the Central League. In June 1963, Richmond joined Chelmsford City, where he stayed until 1965. After two seasons at Chelmsford, Richmond moved to Newcastle upon Tyne, being employed as an electrical engineer.
