= 1989 NBA playoffs =

Basketball tournament

Tournament details
- Dates: April 27–June 13, 1989
- Season: 1988–89
- Teams: 16

Final positions
- Champions: Detroit Pistons (1st title)
- Runners-up: Los Angeles Lakers
- Semifinalists: Phoenix Suns; Chicago Bulls

Tournament statistics
- Scoring leader(s): Michael Jordan (Bulls) (34.8 PPG)

Awards
- MVP: Joe Dumars (Pistons)

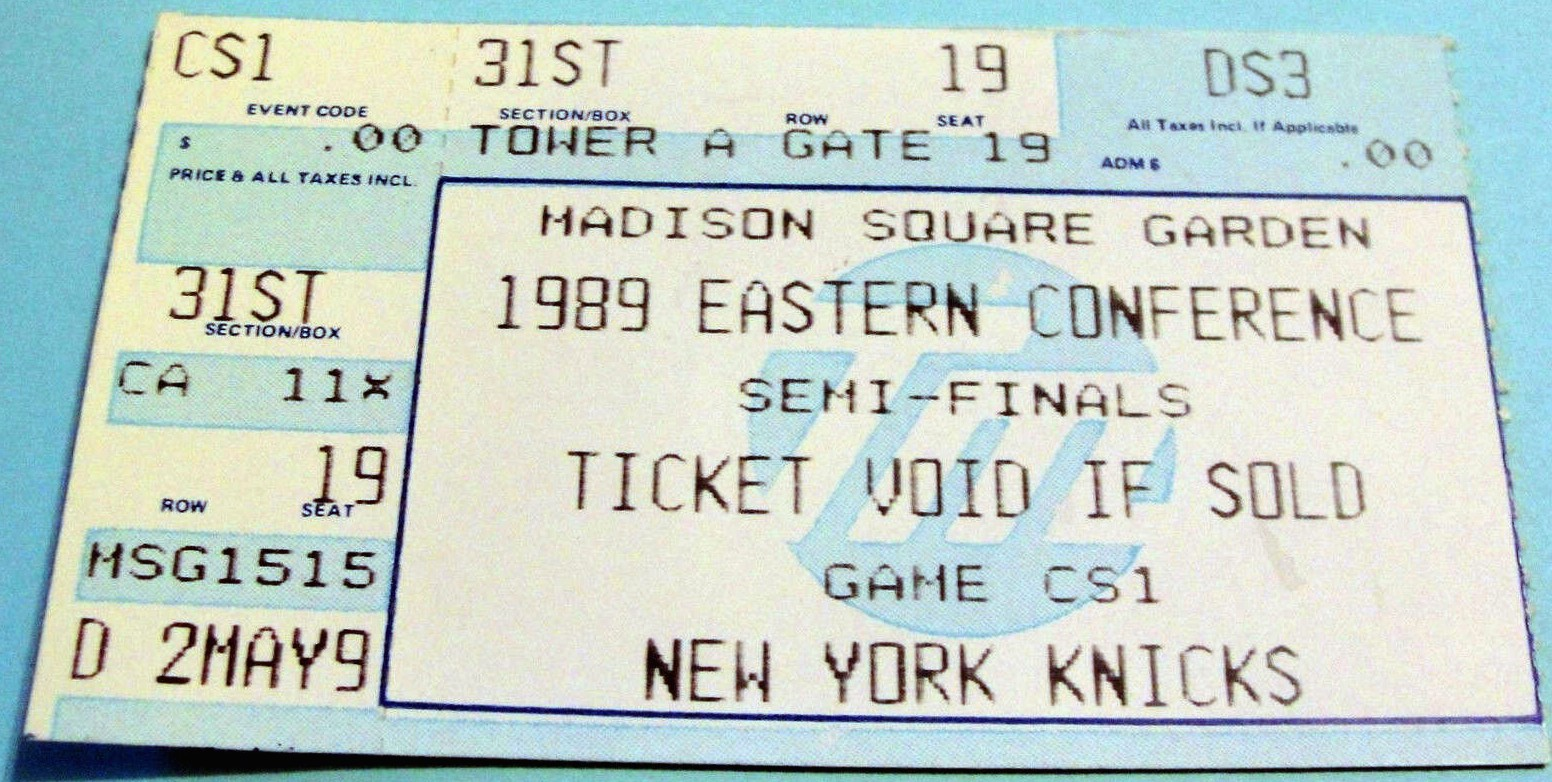
A ticket for Game 1 of the 1989 Eastern Conference Semifinals between the Chicago Bulls and the New York Knicks.

The 1989 NBA playoffs was the postseason tournament of the National Basketball Association's 1988–89 season. The tournament concluded with the Eastern Conference champion Detroit Pistons defeating the Western Conference champion Los Angeles Lakers 4 games to 0 in the NBA Finals. Joe Dumars was named NBA Finals MVP. The Pistons had one of the most dominant playoff runs in NBA history, finishing 15–2 with their only losses to the Chicago Bulls in the Eastern Conference Finals. This NBA playoffs also holds the record for the most sweeps in an entire NBA playoffs with 9 out of 15 series being decided in just 3 or 4 games.

The Lakers won the Western Conference title without losing a game, and entered the NBA Finals as the heavy favorites. However, they were swept in the Finals by the Pistons, due in part to season-ending injuries suffered by Magic Johnson and Byron Scott. The Lakers became the first team in NBA history to open an NBA post-season with 11 straight victories and to sweep three series in an NBA post-season.

Chicago advanced to the Eastern Conference Finals for the first time since 1975 (back when they were a member of the Western Conference) (and the first time in Michael Jordan's career), but their season was ended by Detroit for the second straight year. Two rounds earlier, Jordan hit "The Shot" over Craig Ehlo at the buzzer to beat the Cavs.

The Boston Celtics' first-round playoff sweep by the Pistons was the first time they failed to get past the round of 16. Boston's chances were hampered by the absence of Larry Bird during these playoffs due to a season-ending injury earlier in the season; the first and only time in Bird's NBA career he'd miss playing in the playoffs. It also marked the first time since 1956 that Boston failed to win a single playoff series in one season, snapping a record 28 consecutive postseason appearances with a series win.

Former Utah Jazz head coach Jerry Sloan made the first of 19 playoff appearances in a 22-year tenure. The only time he missed the playoffs with Utah was 2004–2006. Prior to this, he had last appeared in the playoffs in 1981 with the Bulls. His Jazz were ousted by the Golden State Warriors 3–0, the second time a seventh seed had beaten the second seed in the playoffs.

== Bracket ==
First Round	Conference Semifinals
E1	Detroit*	3
E8	Boston	0
E1	Detroit*	4
E5	Milwaukee	0
E4	Atlanta	2
E5	Milwaukee	3
Eastern Conference
E3	Cleveland	2
E6	Chicago	3
E6	Chicago	4
E2	New York*	2
E2	New York*	3
E7	Philadelphia	0
W1	LA Lakers*	3
W8	Portland	0
W1	LA Lakers*	4
W4	Seattle	0
W4	Seattle	3
W5	Houston	1
Western Conference
W3	Phoenix	3
W6	Denver	0
W3	Phoenix	4
W7	Golden State	1
W2	Utah*	0
W7	Golden State	3

Conference Finals
E1	Detroit*	4
E6	Chicago	2
W1	LA Lakers*	4
W3	Phoenix	0

NBA Finals
E1	Detroit*	4
W1	LA Lakers*	0

- * Division winner
- Bold Series winner
- Italic Team with home-court advantage

== First round ==
=== Eastern Conference first round ===
==== (1) Detroit Pistons vs. (8) Boston Celtics ====
April 28

Boxscore

Boston Celtics 91, Detroit Pistons 101
Scoring by quarter: 25–27, 10–21, 28–27, 28–26
Pts: Kevin McHale 27; Rebs: Robert Parish 12; Asts: Brian Shaw 8	Pts: Joe Dumars 25; Rebs: Bill Laimbeer 12; Asts: Isiah Thomas 10
Detroit leads series, 1–0

The Palace of Auburn Hills, Auburn Hills, Michigan
Attendance: 21,454
Referees: Dick Bavetta, Ed Middleton, Earl Strom

April 30

Boxscore

Boston Celtics 95, Detroit Pistons 102
Scoring by quarter: 27–31, 30–23, 25–27, 13–21
Pts: Reggie Lewis 21; Rebs: Kevin McHale 11; Asts: Lewis, Johnson 5 each	Pts: Isiah Thomas 26; Rebs: Bill Laimbeer 15; Asts: Isiah Thomas 8
Detroit leads series, 2–0

The Palace of Auburn Hills, Auburn Hills, Michigan
Attendance: 21,454
Referees: Joe Crawford, Ron Garretson, Bill Oakes

May 2

Boxscore

Detroit Pistons 100, Boston Celtics 85
Scoring by quarter: 31–29, 20–26, 20–18, 29–12
Pts: Vinnie Johnson 25; Rebs: Dennis Rodman 9 Asts: Isiah Thomas 10	Pts: Reggie Lewis 20; Rebs: Joe Kleine 11; Asts: Brian Shaw 7
Detroit wins series, 3–0

Boston Garden, Boston, Massachusetts
Attendance: 14,890
Referees: Joe Forte, Eddie F. Rush, Ed T. Rush

Regular-season series
Detroit won 3–1 in the regular-season series

November 11, 1988

Recap

Detroit Pistons 116, Boston Celtics 107

Boston Garden, Boston

January 16, 1989

Recap

Boston Celtics 87, Detroit Pistons 96

The Palace of Auburn Hills, Auburn Hills, Michigan

January 22, 1989

Recap

Detroit Pistons 99, Boston Celtics 112

Boston Garden, Boston

March 17, 1989

Recap

Boston Celtics 98, Detroit Pistons 106

The Palace of Auburn Hills, Auburn Hills, Michigan

This was the fifth playoff meeting between these two teams, with the Celtics winning three of the first four meetings.

Previous playoff series
Boston leads 3–1 in all-time playoff series

1968

Boston Celtics 4, Detroit Pistons 2

1968 Eastern Division Semifinals

1985

Boston Celtics 4, Detroit Pistons 2

1985 Eastern Conference Semifinals

1987

Boston Celtics 4, Detroit Pistons 3

1987 Eastern Conference Finals

1988

Boston Celtics 2, Detroit Pistons 4

1988 Eastern Conference Finals

==== (2) New York Knicks vs. (7) Philadelphia 76ers ====
April 27

Boxscore

Philadelphia 76ers 96, New York Knicks 102
Scoring by quarter: 28–27, 23–22, 27–31, 18–22
Pts: Ron Anderson 26; Rebs: Charles Barkley 12; Asts: Maurice Cheeks 16	Pts: Gerald Wilkins 34; Rebs: Charles Oakley 12; Asts: Mark Jackson 9
New York leads series, 1–0

Madison Square Garden, New York City, New York
Attendance: 19,591
Referees: Joe Forte, Darell Garretson, Eddie F. Rush

April 29

Boxscore

Philadelphia 76ers 106, New York Knicks 107
Scoring by quarter: 31–33, 23–25, 25–19, 27–30
Pts: Charles Barkley 30; Rebs: Charles Barkley 12; Asts: Maurice Cheeks 12	Pts: Johnny Newman 20; Rebs: Charles Oakley 12; Asts: Mark Jackson 10
New York leads series, 2–0

Madison Square Garden, New York City, New York
Attendance: 19,591
Referees: Hugh Evans, Jack Nies, Wally Rooney

May 2

Boxscore

New York Knicks 116, Philadelphia 76ers 115 (OT)
Scoring by quarter: 28–24, 19–28, 32–26, 27–28, Overtime: 10–9
Pts: Mark Jackson 24; Rebs: Charles Oakley 17; Asts: Mark Jackson 9	Pts: Charles Barkley 29; Rebs: Charles Barkley 11; Asts: Maurice Cheeks 11
New York wins series, 3–0

Spectrum, Philadelphia, Pennsylvania
Attendance: 16,236
Referees: Bruce Alexander, Hue Hollins, Tommy Nunez Sr.

- Gerald Wilkins hits the series-winning shot with 6 seconds left.
- This is the most recent playoff series between the Knicks & 76ers until 2024.

Regular-season series
Philadelphia won 4–2 in the regular-season series

November 18, 1988

Recap

New York Knicks 135, Philadelphia 76ers 137

Spectrum, Philadelphia

November 19, 1988

Recap

Philadelphia 76ers 122, New York Knicks 141

Madison Square Garden, New York City

March 16, 1989

Recap

Philadelphia 76ers 121, New York Knicks 112

Madison Square Garden, New York City

March 20, 1989

Recap

New York Knicks 129, Philadelphia 76ers 109

Spectrum, Philadelphia

April 4, 1989

Recap

Philadelphia 76ers 124, New York Knicks 113

Madison Square Garden, New York City

April 16, 1989

Recap

New York Knicks 112, Philadelphia 76ers 115

Spectrum, Philadelphia

This was the ninth playoff meeting between these two teams, with the 76ers winning six of the first eight meetings.

Previous playoff series
Philadelphia leads 6–2 in all-time playoff series

1950

New York Knicks 1, Syracuse Nationals 2

1950 Eastern Division Finals

1951

New York Knicks 3, Syracuse Nationals 2

1951 Eastern Division Finals

1952

New York Knicks 3, Syracuse Nationals 1

1952 Eastern Division Finals

1954

New York Knicks 0, Syracuse Nationals 2

1954 Eastern Division Round Robin Semifinals

1959

New York Knicks 0, Syracuse Nationals 2

1959 Eastern Division Semifinals

1968

New York Knicks 2, Philadelphia 76ers 4

1968 Eastern Division Semifinals

1978

New York Knicks 0, Philadelphia 76ers 4

1978 Eastern Conference Semifinals

1983

New York Knicks 0, Philadelphia 76ers 4

1983 Eastern Conference Semifinals

==== (3) Cleveland Cavaliers vs. (6) Chicago Bulls ====
April 28

Boxscore

Chicago Bulls 95, Cleveland Cavaliers 88
Scoring by quarter: 24–14, 23–26, 30–17, 18–31
Pts: Michael Jordan 31; Rebs: Horace Grant 13; Asts: Michael Jordan 11	Pts: Craig Ehlo 19; Rebs: Brad Daugherty 7 Asts: Darnell Valentine 6
Chicago leads series, 1–0

Richfield Coliseum, Richfield, Ohio
Attendance: 19,312
Referees: Joe Crawford, Ron Garretson, Bill Oakes

April 30

Boxscore

Chicago Bulls 88, Cleveland Cavaliers 96
Scoring by quarter: 29–23, 18–26, 21–23, 20–24
Pts: Michael Jordan 30; Rebs: Horace Grant 14; Asts: Michael Jordan 10	Pts: Ron Harper 31; Rebs: Ron Harper 11; Asts: Larry Nance 5
Series tied, 1–1

Richfield Coliseum, Richfield, Ohio
Attendance: 20,273
Referees: Ed Middleton, Tommy Nunez Sr., Earl Strom

May 3

Boxscore

Cleveland Cavaliers 94, Chicago Bulls 101
Scoring by quarter: 20–35, 19–15, 30–29, 25–22
Pts: Hot Rod Williams 22; Rebs: Hot Rod Williams 11; Asts: Darnell Valentine 8	Pts: Michael Jordan 44; Rebs: Horace Grant 17; Asts: Michael Jordan 10
Chicago leads series, 2–1

Chicago Stadium, Chicago, Illinois
Attendance: 17,721
Referees: Bernie Fryer, Darell Garretson, Lee Jones

May 5

Boxscore

Cleveland Cavaliers 108, Chicago Bulls 105 (OT)
Scoring by quarter: 23–22, 26–26, 25–28, 25–23, Overtime: 9–6
Pts: Larry Nance 27; Rebs: Brad Daugherty 17; Asts: Mark Price 7	Pts: Michael Jordan 50; Rebs: Horace Grant 16; Asts: Pippen, Hodges 5 each
Series tied, 2–2

Chicago Stadium, Chicago, Illinois
Attendance: 18,264
Referees: Steve Javie, Jess Kersey, Ed T. Rush

- Brad Daugherty hits the game-tying free throws with 4 second left in regulation to force OT.

May 7

Boxscore

Chicago Bulls 101, Cleveland Cavaliers 100
Scoring by quarter: 24–28, 22–20, 23–27, 32–25
Pts: Michael Jordan 44; Rebs: Scottie Pippen 10; Asts: Michael Jordan 6	Pts: Craig Ehlo 24; Rebs: Brad Daugherty 11; Asts: Mark Price 7
Chicago wins series, 3–2

Richfield Coliseum, Richfield, Ohio
Attendance: 20,273
Referees: Hugh Evans, Jack Madden, Jake O'Donnell

- Michael Jordan hits the series-winning shot at the buzzer.

Regular-season series
Cleveland won 6–0 in the regular-season series

December 27, 1988

Recap

Cleveland Cavaliers 107, Chicago Bulls 96

Chicago Stadium, Chicago, Illinois

January 5, 1989

Recap

Chicago Bulls 98, Cleveland Cavaliers 103

The Coliseum, Richfield, Ohio

March 15, 1989

Recap

Chicago Bulls 91, Cleveland Cavaliers 115

The Coliseum, Richfield, Ohio

March 31, 1989

Recap

Cleveland Cavaliers 109, Chicago Bulls 100

Chicago Stadium, Chicago, Illinois

April 16, 1989

Recap

Chicago Bulls 92, Cleveland Cavaliers 111

The Coliseum, Richfield, Ohio

April 23, 1989

Recap

Cleveland Cavaliers 90, Chicago Bulls 84

Chicago Stadium, Chicago, Illinois

This was the second playoff meeting between these two teams, with the Bulls winning the first meeting.

Previous playoff series
Chicago leads 1–0 in all-time playoff series

1988

Chicago Bulls 3, Cleveland Cavaliers 2

1988 Eastern Conference First Round

==== (4) Atlanta Hawks vs. (5) Milwaukee Bucks ====
April 27

Boxscore

Milwaukee Bucks 92, Atlanta Hawks 100
Scoring by quarter: 22–25, 26–24, 23–23, 21–28
Pts: Jay Humphries 20; Rebs: Terry Cummings 8 Asts: Sidney Moncrief 6	Pts: Dominique Wilkins 28; Rebs: Moses Malone 13; Asts: Doc Rivers 10
Atlanta leads series, 1–0

Omni Coliseum, Atlanta, Georgia
Attendance: 14,541
Referees: Hugh Evans, Wally Rooney, Don Vaden

April 29

Boxscore

Milwaukee Bucks 108, Atlanta Hawks 98
Scoring by quarter: 28–27, 26–20, 26–26, 28–25
Pts: Terry Cummings 22; Rebs: Terry Cummings 8 Asts: Jack Sikma 7	Pts: Dominique Wilkins 32; Rebs: Moses Malone 8 Asts: Doc Rivers 8
Series tied, 1–1

Omni Coliseum, Atlanta, Georgia
Attendance: 15,742
Referees: Bruce Alexander, Dick Bavetta, Hue Hollins

May 2

Boxscore

Atlanta Hawks 113, Milwaukee Bucks 117 (OT)
Scoring by quarter: 21–30, 23–26, 34–25, 24–21, Overtime: 11–15
Pts: Dominique Wilkins 30; Rebs: Jon Koncak 11; Asts: Reggie Theus 5	Pts: Ricky Pierce 35; Rebs: Terry Cummings 14; Asts: Jay Humphries 10
Milwaukee leads series, 2–1

Bradley Center, Milwaukee, Wisconsin
Attendance: 18,469
Referees: Joe Crawford, Bill Oakes, Bennett Salvatore

May 5

Boxscore

Atlanta Hawks 113, Milwaukee Bucks 106 (OT)
Scoring by quarter: 28–28, 30–17, 20–24, 20–29, Overtime: 15–8
Pts: Malone, Wilkins 24 each Rebs: Moses Malone 17; Asts: Spud Webb 7	Pts: Jack Sikma 24; Rebs: Larry Krystkowiak 10; Asts: Jay Humphries 15
Series tied, 2–2

Bradley Center, Milwaukee, Wisconsin
Attendance: 18,633
Referees: Bernie Fryer, Mike Mathis, Jake O'Donnell

May 7

Boxscore

Milwaukee Bucks 96, Atlanta Hawks 92
Scoring by quarter: 21–19, 23–25, 29–26, 23–22
Pts: Ricky Pierce 25; Rebs: Jack Sikma 9 Asts: Jay Humphries 5	Pts: Moses Malone 25; Rebs: Moses Malone 16; Asts: Rivers, Theus 6 each
Milwaukee wins series, 3–2

Omni Coliseum, Atlanta, Georgia
Attendance: 16,220
Referees: Darell Garretson, Paul Mihalak, Earl Strom

Regular-season series
Atlanta won 6–0 in the regular-season series

November 5, 1988

Recap

Atlanta Hawks 107, Milwaukee Bucks 94

Bradley Center, Milwaukee

December 16, 1988

Recap

Milwaukee Bucks 112, Atlanta Hawks 115

The Omni, Atlanta

December 30, 1988

Recap

Atlanta Hawks 117, Milwaukee Bucks 113

Bradley Center, Milwaukee

January 17, 1989

Recap

Milwaukee Bucks 98, Atlanta Hawks 111

The Omni, Atlanta

April 15, 1989

Recap

Milwaukee Bucks 100, Atlanta Hawks 125

The Omni, Atlanta

April 19, 1989

Recap

Atlanta Hawks 100, Milwaukee Bucks 92

Bradley Center, Milwaukee

This was the third playoff meeting between these two teams, with each team winning one series apiece.

Previous playoff series
Tied 1–1 in all-time playoff series

1984

Atlanta Hawks 2, Milwaukee Bucks 3

1984 Eastern Conference First Round

1988

Atlanta Hawks 3, Milwaukee Bucks 2

1988 Eastern Conference First Round

=== Western Conference first round ===
==== (1) Los Angeles Lakers vs. (8) Portland Trail Blazers ====
April 27

Boxscore

Portland Trail Blazers 108, Los Angeles Lakers 128
Scoring by quarter: 21–34, 30–30, 25–31, 32–33
Pts: Clyde Drexler 30; Rebs: Kersey, Porter 9 each Asts: Terry Porter 10	Pts: Magic Johnson 30; Rebs: Scott, Abdul-Jabbar 8 each Asts: Magic Johnson 16
LA Lakers lead series, 1–0

Great Western Forum, Inglewood, California
Attendance: 17,505
Referees: Terry Durham, Lee Jones, Mike Mathis

April 30

Boxscore

Portland Trail Blazers 105, Los Angeles Lakers 113
Scoring by quarter: 23–35, 23–21, 30–30, 29–27
Pts: Clyde Drexler 28; Rebs: Jerome Kersey 11; Asts: Clyde Drexler 10	Pts: Magic Johnson 35; Rebs: A.C. Green 13; Asts: Magic Johnson 12
LA Lakers lead series, 2–0

Great Western Forum, Inglewood, California
Attendance: 17,505
Referees: Jake O'Donnell, Blane Reichelt, Bill Saar

May 3

Boxscore

Los Angeles Lakers 116, Portland Trail Blazers 108
Scoring by quarter: 27–22, 22–32, 37–22, 30–32
Pts: Byron Scott 25; Rebs: A.C. Green 13; Asts: Magic Johnson 7	Pts: Terry Porter 29; Rebs: Clyde Drexler 8 Asts: Terry Porter 9
LA Lakers win series, 3–0

Memorial Coliseum, Portland, Oregon
Attendance: 12,880
Referees: Jim Clark, Jack Nies, Earl Strom

Regular-season series
Los Angeles won 5–0 in the regular-season series

November 18, 1988

Recap

Portland Trail Blazers 105, Los Angeles Lakers 106

The Forum, Inglewood, California

January 4, 1989

Recap

Portland Trail Blazers 120, Los Angeles Lakers 133

Great Western Forum, Inglewood, California

February 3, 1989

Recap

Portland Trail Blazers 129, Los Angeles Lakers 140

Great Western Forum, Inglewood, California

February 16, 1989

Recap

Los Angeles Lakers 110, Portland Trail Blazers 101

Memorial Coliseum, Portland, Oregon

April 21, 1989

Recap

Los Angeles Lakers 121, Portland Trail Blazers 114

Memorial Coliseum, Portland, Oregon

This was the fourth playoff meeting between these two teams, with the Lakers winning two of the first three meetings.

Previous playoff series
Los Angeles leads 2–1 in all-time playoff series

1977

Los Angeles Lakers 0, Portland Trail Blazers 4

1977 Western Conference Finals

1983

Los Angeles Lakers 4, Portland Trail Blazers 1

1983 Western Conference Semifinals

1985

Los Angeles Lakers 4, Portland Trail Blazers 1

1985 Western Conference Semifinals

==== (2) Utah Jazz vs. (7) Golden State Warriors ====
April 27

Boxscore

Golden State Warriors 123, Utah Jazz 119
Scoring by quarter: 35–25, 26–34, 32–29, 30–31
Pts: Chris Mullin 41; Rebs: Larry Smith 11; Asts: Winston Garland 8	Pts: John Stockton 30; Rebs: Karl Malone 13; Asts: John Stockton 14
Golden State leads series, 1–0

Salt Palace, Salt Lake City, Utah
Attendance: 12,444
Referees: Steve Javie, Ed T. Rush, Bill Saar

April 29

Boxscore

Golden State Warriors 99, Utah Jazz 91
Scoring by quarter: 26–28, 19–20, 26–26, 28–17
Pts: Chris Mullin 22; Rebs: three players 7 each Asts: Chris Mullin 7	Pts: Karl Malone 37; Rebs: Karl Malone 22; Asts: John Stockton 11
Golden State leads series, 2–0

Salt Palace, Salt Lake City, Utah
Attendance: 12,444
Referees: Bernie Fryer, Lee Jones, Mike Mathis

May 2

Boxscore

Utah Jazz 106, Golden State Warriors 120
Scoring by quarter: 22–23, 27–25, 22–34, 35–38
Pts: John Stockton 34; Rebs: Karl Malone 14; Asts: John Stockton 16	Pts: Chris Mullin 35; Rebs: Rod Higgins 14; Asts: Mitch Richmond 11
Golden State wins series, 3–0

Oakland–Alameda County Coliseum Arena, Oakland, California
Attendance: 15,025
Referees: Dan Crawford, Bob Delaney, Jess Kersey

- In the 16-team playoff format, this is the only time a top 2 seed has been swept in the First Round in NBA history. However, a top 2 seed has yet to be swept in the First Round in a best-of-seven series format.

Regular-season series
Tied 2–2 in the regular-season series

December 6, 1988

Recap

Utah Jazz 103, Golden State Warriors 114

Oakland–Alameda County Coliseum Arena, Oakland, California

January 14, 1989

Recap

Utah Jazz 105, Golden State Warriors 131

Oakland–Alameda County Coliseum Arena, Oakland, California

March 10, 1989

Recap

Golden State Warriors 112, Utah Jazz 126

Salt Palace, Salt Lake City

April 22, 1989

Recap

Golden State Warriors 95, Utah Jazz 111

Salt Palace, Salt Lake City

This was the second playoff meeting between these two teams, with the Warriors winning the first meeting.

Previous playoff series
Golden State leads 1–0 in all-time playoff series

1987

Utah Jazz 2, Golden State Warriors 3

1987 Western Conference First Round

==== (3) Phoenix Suns vs. (6) Denver Nuggets ====
April 28

Boxscore

Denver Nuggets 103, Phoenix Suns 104
Scoring by quarter: 20–23, 22–32, 32–22, 29–27
Pts: Walter Davis 34; Rebs: Fat Lever 12; Asts: Fat Lever 17	Pts: Chambers, K. Johnson 26 each Rebs: Tom Chambers 17; Asts: Kevin Johnson 9
Phoenix leads series, 1–0

Arizona Veterans Memorial Coliseum, Phoenix, Arizona
Attendance: 14,471
Referees: Steve Javie, Ed T. Rush, Bill Saar

April 30

Boxscore

Denver Nuggets 114, Phoenix Suns 132
Scoring by quarter: 24–30, 21–37, 40–35, 29–30
Pts: Alex English 36; Rebs: Michael Adams 12; Asts: English, Cook 6 each	Pts: Kevin Johnson 34; Rebs: Tom Chambers 12; Asts: Kevin Johnson 14
Phoenix leads series, 2–0

Arizona Veterans Memorial Coliseum, Phoenix, Arizona
Attendance: 14,471
Referees: Bob Delaney, Jess Kersey, Paul Mihalak

May 2

Boxscore

Phoenix Suns 130, Denver Nuggets 121
Scoring by quarter: 27–36, 27–36, 34–29, 42–20
Pts: Chambers, K. Johnson 32 each Rebs: Tom Chambers 17; Asts: Kevin Johnson 16	Pts: Walter Davis 26; Rebs: Elston Turner 7 Asts: Bill Hanzlik 6
Phoenix wins series, 3–0

McNichols Sports Arena, Denver, Colorado
Attendance: 12,660
Referees: Dick Bavetta, Jake O'Donnell, Don Vaden

- This is the most recent playoff series between the Suns & Nuggets until 2021.

Regular-season series
Phoenix won 3–1 in the regular-season series

December 22, 1988

Recap

Phoenix Suns 126, Denver Nuggets 118

McNichols Sports Arena, Denver, Colorado

December 23, 1988

Recap

Denver Nuggets 107, Phoenix Suns 119

Arizona Veterans Memorial Coliseum, Phoenix, Arizona

January 28, 1989

Recap

Phoenix Suns 138, Denver Nuggets 142

McNichols Sports Arena, Denver, Colorado

January 30, 1989

Recap

Denver Nuggets 100, Phoenix Suns 126

Arizona Veterans Memorial Coliseum, Phoenix, Arizona

This was the third playoff meeting between these two teams, with each team winning one series apiece.

Previous playoff series
Tied 1–1 in all-time playoff series

1982

Denver Nuggets 1, Phoenix Suns 2

1982 Western Conference First Round

1983

Denver Nuggets 2, Phoenix Suns 1

1983 Western Conference First Round

==== (4) Seattle SuperSonics vs. (5) Houston Rockets ====
April 28

Boxscore

Houston Rockets 107, Seattle SuperSonics 111
Scoring by quarter: 25–23, 30–30, 21–32, 31–26
Pts: Hakeem Olajuwon 28; Rebs: Hakeem Olajuwon 9 Asts: Sleepy Floyd 7	Pts: Dale Ellis 25; Rebs: Xavier McDaniel 11; Asts: Nate McMillan 11
Seattle leads series, 1–0

Kingdome, Seattle, Washington
Attendance: 14,250
Referees: Paul Mihalak, Jake O'Donnell, Blane Reichelt

April 30

Boxscore

Houston Rockets 97, Seattle SuperSonics 109
Scoring by quarter: 26–26, 20–20, 27–29, 24–34
Pts: Hakeem Olajuwon 30; Rebs: Hakeem Olajuwon 12; Asts: Sleepy Floyd 6	Pts: McDaniel, Lister 20 each Rebs: Olden Polynice 10; Asts: Nate McMillan 8
Seattle leads series, 2–0

Kingdome, Seattle, Washington
Attendance: 12,887
Referees: Jim Clark, Dan Crawford, Darell Garretson

May 3

Boxscore

Seattle SuperSonics 107, Houston Rockets 126
Scoring by quarter: 20–31, 27–32, 29–31, 31–32
Pts: Dale Ellis 26; Rebs: Michael Cage 10; Asts: Nate McMillan 10	Pts: Sleepy Floyd 28; Rebs: Hakeem Olajuwon 18; Asts: Sleepy Floyd 6
Seattle leads series, 2–1

The Summit, Houston, Texas
Attendance: 16,611
Referees: Hugh Evans, Wally Rooney, Bennett Salvatore

May 5

Boxscore

Seattle SuperSonics 98, Houston Rockets 96
Scoring by quarter: 29–27, 22–26, 25–26, 22–17
Pts: Dale Ellis 26; Rebs: Xavier McDaniel 10; Asts: Nate McMillan 10	Pts: Hakeem Olajuwon 24; Rebs: Hakeem Olajuwon 13; Asts: Floyd, Woodson 7 each
Seattle wins series, 3–1

The Summit, Houston, Texas
Attendance: 16,611
Referees: Jack Madden, Bill Oakes, Earl Strom

- Derrick McKey hits the series-winning alley-oop layup at the buzzer.

Regular-season series
Tied 2–2 in the regular-season series

December 10, 1988

Recap

Seattle SuperSonics 91, Houston Rockets 110

The Summit, Houston

January 19, 1989

Recap

Houston Rockets 108, Seattle SuperSonics 124

Seattle Center Coliseum, Seattle

March 3, 1989

Recap

Houston Rockets 108, Seattle SuperSonics 118

Seattle Center Coliseum, Seattle

March 28, 1989

Recap

Seattle SuperSonics 117, Houston Rockets 120

The Summit, Houston

This was the third playoff meeting between these two teams, with the SuperSonics winning the first two meetings.

Previous playoff series
Seattle leads 2–0 in all-time playoff series

1982

Houston Rockets 1, Seattle SuperSonics 2

1982 Western Conference First Round

1987

Houston Rockets 2, Seattle SuperSonics 4

1987 Western Conference Semifinals

== Conference semifinals ==
=== Eastern Conference semifinals ===
==== (1) Detroit Pistons vs. (5) Milwaukee Bucks ====
May 10

Boxscore

Milwaukee Bucks 80, Detroit Pistons 85
Scoring by quarter: 25–21, 23–18, 21–25, 11–21
Pts: Ricky Pierce 25; Rebs: Sidney Moncrief 6 Asts: Jay Humphries 6	Pts: Bill Laimbeer 19; Rebs: Bill Laimbeer 17; Asts: Joe Dumars 6
Detroit leads series, 1–0

The Palace of Auburn Hills, Auburn Hills, Michigan
Attendance: 21,454
Referees: Dick Bavetta, Hugh Evans, Tommy Nunez Sr.

May 12

Boxscore

Milwaukee Bucks 92, Detroit Pistons 112
Scoring by quarter: 23–26, 26–23, 19–26, 24–37
Pts: Krystkowiak, Pierce 22 each Rebs: Larry Krystkowiak 13; Asts: Rickey Green 6	Pts: John Salley 23; Rebs: Dennis Rodman 13; Asts: Isiah Thomas 10
Detroit leads series, 2–0

The Palace of Auburn Hills, Auburn Hills, Michigan
Attendance: 21,454
Referees: Hue Hollins, Jack Madden, Bennett Salvatore

May 14

Boxscore

Detroit Pistons 110, Milwaukee Bucks 90
Scoring by quarter: 24–16, 23–22, 38–25, 25–27
Pts: Isiah Thomas 26; Rebs: Bill Laimbeer 11; Asts: Joe Dumars 10	Pts: Ricky Pierce 22; Rebs: Randy Breuer 8 Asts: Jay Humphries 5
Detroit leads series, 3–0

Bradley Center, Milwaukee, Wisconsin
Attendance: 18,633
Referees: Steve Javie, Jess Kersey, Mike Mathis

May 15

Boxscore

Detroit Pistons 96, Milwaukee Bucks 94
Scoring by quarter: 20–33, 24–21, 32–17, 20–23
Pts: Joe Dumars 22; Rebs: Isiah Thomas 10; Asts: Isiah Thomas 13	Pts: Fred Roberts 33; Rebs: Randy Breuer 9 Asts: Jay Humphries 14
Detroit wins series, 4–0

Bradley Center, Milwaukee, Wisconsin
Attendance: 18,633
Referees: Joe Forte, Bernie Fryer, Darell Garretson

Regular-season series
Milwaukee won 4–2 in the regular-season series

December 6, 1988

Recap

Detroit Pistons 84, Milwaukee Bucks 109

Bradley Center, Milwaukee

December 14, 1988

Recap

Milwaukee Bucks 119, Detroit Pistons 110

The Palace of Auburn Hills, Auburn Hills, Michigan

January 15, 1989

Recap

Detroit Pistons 112, Milwaukee Bucks 120

Bradley Center, Milwaukee

February 8, 1989

Recap

Milwaukee Bucks 96, Detroit Pistons 107

The Palace of Auburn Hills, Auburn Hills, Michigan

March 18, 1989

Recap

Detroit Pistons 100, Milwaukee Bucks 117

Bradley Center, Milwaukee

April 9, 1989

Recap

Milwaukee Bucks 91, Detroit Pistons 100

The Palace of Auburn Hills, Auburn Hills, Michigan

This was the second playoff meeting between these two teams, with the Pistons winning the first meeting.

Previous playoff series
Detroit leads 1–0 in all-time playoff series

1976

Detroit Pistons 2, Milwaukee Bucks 1

1976 Western Conference First Round

==== (2) New York Knicks vs. (6) Chicago Bulls ====
May 9

Boxscore

Chicago Bulls 120, New York Knicks 109 (OT)
Scoring by quarter: 27–27, 20–19, 27–29, 29–28, Overtime: 17–6
Pts: Michael Jordan 34; Rebs: Bill Cartwright 14; Asts: Michael Jordan 12	Pts: Johnny Newman 27; Rebs: Patrick Ewing 10; Asts: Mark Jackson 11
Chicago leads series, 1–0

Madison Square Garden, New York City, New York
Attendance: 19,591
Referees: Mike Mathis, Paul Mihalak, Bill Saar

Michael Jordan hits the game tying free throws with 1:15 left in regulation to force OT

May 11

Boxscore

Chicago Bulls 97, New York Knicks 114
Scoring by quarter: 15–21, 26–29, 23–27, 33–37
Pts: John Paxson 16; Rebs: Charles Davis 9 Asts: Scottie Pippen 5	Pts: Patrick Ewing 23; Rebs: Charles Oakley 13; Asts: Mark Jackson 16
Series tied, 1–1

Madison Square Garden, New York City, New York
Attendance: 19,591
Referees: Joe Crawford, Joe Forte, Lee Jones

May 13

Boxscore

New York Knicks 88, Chicago Bulls 111
Scoring by quarter: 20–24, 26–42, 21–17, 21–28
Pts: Patrick Ewing 19; Rebs: Charles Oakley 9 Asts: Mark Jackson 6	Pts: Michael Jordan 40; Rebs: Michael Jordan 15; Asts: Michael Jordan 9
Chicago leads series, 2–1

Chicago Stadium, Chicago, Illinois
Attendance: 18,599
Referees: Dick Bavetta, Tommy Nunez Sr., Earl Strom

May 14

Boxscore

New York Knicks 93, Chicago Bulls 106
Scoring by quarter: 23–27, 30–28, 20–22, 20–29
Pts: Johnny Newman 23; Rebs: Charles Oakley 16; Asts: Gerald Wilkins 5	Pts: Michael Jordan 47; Rebs: Michael Jordan 11; Asts: Scottie Pippen 8
Chicago leads series, 3–1

Chicago Stadium, Chicago, Illinois
Attendance: 18,637
Referees: Hugh Evans, Bernie Fryer, Hue Hollins

May 16

Boxscore

Chicago Bulls 114, New York Knicks 121
Scoring by quarter: 28–33, 31–29, 18–32, 37–27
Pts: Michael Jordan 38; Rebs: Scottie Pippen 9 Asts: Michael Jordan 10	Pts: Patrick Ewing 32; Rebs: Charles Oakley 13; Asts: Mark Jackson 14
Chicago leads series, 3–2

Madison Square Garden, New York City, New York
Attendance: 19,591
Referees: Jess Kersey, Jack Madden, Bill Oakes

May 19

Boxscore

New York Knicks 111, Chicago Bulls 113
Scoring by quarter: 31–32, 30–27, 18–27, 32–27
Pts: three players 22 each Rebs: Patrick Ewing 13; Asts: Mark Jackson 12	Pts: Michael Jordan 40; Rebs: Bill Cartwright 8 Asts: Michael Jordan 10
Chicago wins series, 4–2

Chicago Stadium, Chicago, Illinois
Attendance: 18,676
Referees: Darell Garretson, Jake O'Donnell, Ed T. Rush

- Michael Jordan hits the series-winning free throws with 4 seconds left.

Regular-season series
Chicago won 3–2 in the regular-season series

November 8, 1988

Recap

Chicago Bulls 117, New York Knicks 126

Madison Square Garden, New York City

December 29, 1988

Recap

New York Knicks 106, Chicago Bulls 108

Chicago Stadium, Chicago, Illinois

March 4, 1989

Recap

Chicago Bulls 104, New York Knicks 122

Madison Square Garden, New York City

March 17, 1989

Recap

New York Knicks 124, Chicago Bulls 129

Chicago Stadium, Chicago, Illinois

April 17, 1989

Recap

New York Knicks 100, Chicago Bulls 104

Chicago Stadium, Chicago, Illinois

This was the second playoff meeting between these two teams, with the Bulls winning the first meeting.

Previous playoff series
Chicago leads 1–0 in all-time playoff series

1981

Chicago Bulls 2, New York Knicks 0

1981 Eastern Conference First Round

=== Western Conference semifinals ===
==== (1) Los Angeles Lakers vs. (4) Seattle SuperSonics ====
May 7

Boxscore

Seattle SuperSonics 102, Los Angeles Lakers 113
Scoring by quarter: 22–27, 32–25, 27–28, 21–33
Pts: Derrick McKey 23; Rebs: Olden Polynice 10; Asts: Nate McMillan 12	Pts: James Worthy 28; Rebs: James Worthy 12; Asts: Magic Johnson 14
LA Lakers lead series, 1–0

Great Western Forum, Inglewood, California
Attendance: 17,505
Referees: Dick Bavetta, Hue Hollins, Ed Middleton

May 10

Boxscore

Seattle SuperSonics 108, Los Angeles Lakers 130
Scoring by quarter: 26–32, 27–31, 19–32, 36–35
Pts: Xavier McDaniel 17; Rebs: Xavier McDaniel 8 Asts: Sedale Threatt 9	Pts: James Worthy 30; Rebs: A.C. Green 8 Asts: Magic Johnson 12
LA Lakers lead series, 2–0

Great Western Forum, Inglewood, California
Attendance: 17,505
Referees: Dan Crawford, Jess Kersey, Wally Rooney

May 12

Boxscore

Los Angeles Lakers 91, Seattle SuperSonics 86
Scoring by quarter: 25–19, 23–26, 25–15, 18–26
Pts: James Worthy 20; Rebs: Magic Johnson 9 Asts: Magic Johnson 14	Pts: Dale Ellis 30; Rebs: Xavier McDaniel 12; Asts: Sedale Threatt 9
LA Lakers lead series, 3–0

Kingdome, Seattle, Washington
Attendance: 14,541
Referees: Jim Clark, Bill Oakes, Ed T. Rush

May 14

Boxscore

Los Angeles Lakers 97, Seattle SuperSonics 95
Scoring by quarter: 12–32, 31–22, 22–19, 32–22
Pts: James Worthy 33; Rebs: A.C. Green 10; Asts: Magic Johnson 9	Pts: Xavier McDaniel 30; Rebs: Xavier McDaniel 11; Asts: Nate McMillan 8
LA Lakers win series, 4–0

Kingdome, Seattle, Washington
Attendance: 14,006
Referees: Paul Mihalak, Jack Nies, Jake O'Donnell

- The Lakers posted the greatest comeback in NBA playoff history by overcoming a 29-point deficit (43–14), which has since been surpassed.

Regular-season series
Los Angeles won 4–2 in the regular-season series

November 11, 1988

Recap

Seattle SuperSonics 103, Los Angeles Lakers 114

The Forum, Inglewood, California

November 17, 1988

Recap

Los Angeles Lakers 98, Seattle SuperSonics 101

Seattle Center Coliseum, Seattle

November 30, 1988

Recap

Seattle SuperSonics 106, Los Angeles Lakers 110

The Forum, Inglewood, California

January 3, 1989

Recap

Los Angeles Lakers 106, Seattle SuperSonics 116

Seattle Center Coliseum, Seattle

April 4, 1989

Recap

Los Angeles Lakers 115, Seattle SuperSonics 97

Seattle Center Coliseum, Seattle

April 23, 1989

Recap

Seattle SuperSonics 117, Los Angeles Lakers 121

Great Western Forum, Inglewood, California

This was the fifth playoff meeting between these two teams, with each team winning two series apiece.

Previous playoff series
Tied 2–2 in all-time playoff series

1978

Los Angeles Lakers 1, Seattle SuperSonics 2

1978 Western Conference First Round

1979

Los Angeles Lakers 1, Seattle SuperSonics 4

1979 Western Conference Semifinals

1980

Los Angeles Lakers 4, Seattle SuperSonics 1

1980 Western Conference Finals

1987

Los Angeles Lakers 4, Seattle SuperSonics 0

1987 Western Conference Finals

==== (3) Phoenix Suns vs. (7) Golden State Warriors ====
May 6

Boxscore

Golden State Warriors 103, Phoenix Suns 130
Scoring by quarter: 29–35, 22–31, 22–41, 30–23
Pts: Mullin, Teagle 18 each Rebs: Larry Smith 8 Asts: Winston Garland 6	Pts: Tom Chambers 25; Rebs: Eddie Johnson 9 Asts: Kevin Johnson 11
Phoenix leads series, 1–0

Arizona Veterans Memorial Coliseum, Phoenix, Arizona
Attendance: 14,471
Referees: Joe Crawford, Joe Forte, Bennett Salvatore

May 9

Boxscore

Golden State Warriors 127, Phoenix Suns 122
Scoring by quarter: 31–32, 34–32, 35–34, 27–24
Pts: Chris Mullin 37; Rebs: Mitch Richmond 13; Asts: Chris Mullin 5	Pts: Eddie Johnson 35; Rebs: Eddie Johnson 9 Asts: Kevin Johnson 12
Series tied, 1–1

Arizona Veterans Memorial Coliseum, Phoenix, Arizona
Attendance: 14,471
Referees: Bruce Alexander, Bill Oakes, Ed T. Rush

May 11

Boxscore

Phoenix Suns 113, Golden State Warriors 104
Scoring by quarter: 35–20, 24–30, 26–32, 28–22
Pts: Tom Chambers 31; Rebs: Chambers, Corbin 14 each Asts: Kevin Johnson 15	Pts: Chris Mullin 32; Rebs: Higgins, Bol 9 each Asts: Chris Mullin 6
Phoenix leads series, 2–1

Oakland–Alameda County Coliseum Arena, Oakland, California
Attendance: 15,025
Referees: Steve Javie, Ed Middleton, Jake O'Donnell

May 13

Boxscore

Phoenix Suns 135, Golden State Warriors 99
Scoring by quarter: 31–22, 36–39, 35–22, 33–16
Pts: Eddie Johnson 34; Rebs: Tyrone Corbin 13; Asts: Hornacek, K. Johnson 8 each	Pts: Chris Mullin 28; Rebs: Chris Mullin 7 Asts: Winston Garland 4
Phoenix leads series, 3–1

Oakland–Alameda County Coliseum Arena, Oakland, California
Attendance: 15,025
Referees: Dan Crawford, Darell Garretson, Wally Rooney

May 16

Boxscore

Golden State Warriors 104, Phoenix Suns 116
Scoring by quarter: 26–22, 24–27, 24–30, 30–37
Pts: Mitch Richmond 23; Rebs: Larry Smith 9 Asts: Chris Mullin 6	Pts: K. Johnson, Chambers 24 each Rebs: E. Johnson, Chambers 11 each Asts: Kevin Johnson 11
Phoenix wins series, 4–1

Arizona Veterans Memorial Coliseum, Phoenix, Arizona
Attendance: 14,471
Referees: Hue Hollins, Paul Mihalak, Earl Strom

Regular-season series
Phoenix won 4–2 in the regular-season series

November 5, 1988

Recap

Phoenix Suns 104, Golden State Warriors 117

Oakland–Alameda County Coliseum Arena, Oakland, California

November 11, 1988

Recap

Golden State Warriors 103, Phoenix Suns 141

Arizona Veterans Memorial Coliseum, Phoenix, Arizona

December 9, 1988

Recap

Golden State Warriors 105, Phoenix Suns 110

Arizona Veterans Memorial Coliseum, Phoenix, Arizona

January 9, 1989

Recap

Phoenix Suns 124, Golden State Warriors 130

Oakland–Alameda County Coliseum Arena, Oakland, California

February 21, 1989

Recap

Golden State Warriors 121, Phoenix Suns 139

Arizona Veterans Memorial Coliseum, Phoenix, Arizona

March 23, 1989

Recap

Phoenix Suns 154, Golden State Warriors 124

Oakland–Alameda County Coliseum Arena, Oakland, California

This was the second playoff meeting between these two teams, with the Suns winning the first meeting.

Previous playoff series
Phoenix leads 1–0 in all-time playoff series

1976

Golden State Warriors 3, Phoenix Suns 4

1976 Western Conference Finals

== Conference finals ==
=== Eastern Conference finals ===
==== (1) Detroit Pistons vs. (6) Chicago Bulls ====
May 21

Boxscore

Chicago Bulls 94, Detroit Pistons 88
Scoring by quarter: 33–17, 17–17, 21–29, 23–25
Pts: Michael Jordan 32; Rebs: Jordan, Pippen 11 each Asts: Scottie Pippen 6	Pts: Rick Mahorn 17; Rebs: Bill Laimbeer 15; Asts: Isiah Thomas 10
Chicago leads series, 1–0

The Palace of Auburn Hills, Auburn Hills, Michigan
Attendance: 21,454
Referees: Joe Crawford, Hugh Evans, Tommy Nunez Sr.

May 23

Boxscore

Chicago Bulls 91, Detroit Pistons 100
Scoring by quarter: 23–19, 26–30, 21–26, 21–25
Pts: Michael Jordan 27; Rebs: Horace Grant 20; Asts: John Paxson 6	Pts: Isiah Thomas 33; Rebs: Dennis Rodman 12; Asts: Isiah Thomas 4
Series tied, 1–1

The Palace of Auburn Hills, Auburn Hills, Michigan
Attendance: 21,454
Referees: Mike Mathis, Bill Saar, Earl Strom

May 27

Boxscore

Detroit Pistons 97, Chicago Bulls 99
Scoring by quarter: 28–27, 28–18, 21–21, 20–33
Pts: Mark Aguirre 25; Rebs: Dennis Rodman 13; Asts: Isiah Thomas 11	Pts: Michael Jordan 46; Rebs: Scottie Pippen 8 Asts: Jordan, Hodges 5 each
Chicago leads series, 2–1

Chicago Stadium, Chicago, Illinois
Attendance: 18,676
Referees: Jack Madden, Bill Oakes, Ed T. Rush

- Michael Jordan hits the game-winner with 3 seconds left.

May 29

Boxscore

Detroit Pistons 86, Chicago Bulls 80
Scoring by quarter: 22–26, 20–13, 22–21, 22–20
Pts: Isiah Thomas 27; Rebs: Dennis Rodman 18; Asts: Isiah Thomas 6	Pts: Michael Jordan 23; Rebs: Horace Grant 12; Asts: Craig Hodges 5
Series tied, 2–2

Chicago Stadium, Chicago, Illinois
Attendance: 18,676
Referees: Jess Kersey, Jake O'Donnell, Wally Rooney

May 31

Boxscore

Chicago Bulls 85, Detroit Pistons 94
Scoring by quarter: 25–17, 20–24, 19–24, 21–29
Pts: Craig Hodges 19; Rebs: Bill Cartwright 12; Asts: Michael Jordan 9	Pts: Vinnie Johnson 22; Rebs: Dennis Rodman 14; Asts: Isiah Thomas 12
Detroit leads series, 3–2

The Palace of Auburn Hills, Auburn Hills, Michigan
Attendance: 21,454
Referees: Dick Bavetta, Darell Garretson, Hue Hollins

June 2

Boxscore

Detroit Pistons 103, Chicago Bulls 94
Scoring by quarter: 24–26, 25–21, 28–22, 26–25
Pts: Isiah Thomas 33; Rebs: Dennis Rodman 15; Asts: Joe Dumars 9	Pts: Michael Jordan 32; Rebs: Horace Grant 13; Asts: Michael Jordan 13
Detroit wins series, 4–2

Chicago Stadium, Chicago, Illinois
Attendance: 18,676
Referees: Joe Crawford, Hugh Evans, Earl Strom

Regular-season series
Detroit won 6–0 in the regular-season series

November 4, 1988

Recap

Detroit Pistons 107, Chicago Bulls 94

Chicago Stadium, Chicago, Illinois

December 7, 1988

Recap

Chicago Bulls 89, Detroit Pistons 102

The Palace of Auburn Hills, Auburn Hills, Michigan

January 31, 1989

Recap

Detroit Pistons 104, Chicago Bulls 98 (OT)

Chicago Stadium, Chicago, Illinois

February 5, 1989

Recap

Chicago Bulls 102, Detroit Pistons 113

The Palace of Auburn Hills, Auburn Hills, Michigan

April 6, 1989

Recap

Chicago Bulls 108, Detroit Pistons 115

The Palace of Auburn Hills, Auburn Hills, Michigan

April 7, 1989

Recap

Detroit Pistons 114, Chicago Bulls 112 (OT)

Chicago Stadium, Chicago, Illinois

This was the third playoff meeting between these two teams, with each team winning one series apiece.

Previous playoff series
Tied 1–1 in all-time playoff series

1974

Chicago Bulls 4, Detroit Pistons 3

1974 Western Conference Semifinals

1988

Chicago Bulls 1, Detroit Pistons 4

1988 Eastern Conference Semifinals

=== Western Conference finals ===
==== (1) Los Angeles Lakers vs. (3) Phoenix Suns ====
May 20

Boxscore

Phoenix Suns 119, Los Angeles Lakers 127
Scoring by quarter: 24–38, 35–27, 30–26, 30–36
Pts: Kevin Johnson 27; Rebs: Tom Chambers 10; Asts: Kevin Johnson 18	Pts: James Worthy 32; Rebs: A.C. Green 10; Asts: Magic Johnson 12
LA Lakers lead series, 1–0

Great Western Forum, Inglewood, California
Attendance: 17,505
Referees: Lee Jones, Jack Madden, Mike Mathis

May 23

Boxscore

Phoenix Suns 95, Los Angeles Lakers 101
Scoring by quarter: 28–27, 27–24, 18–20, 22–30
Pts: Kevin Johnson 22; Rebs: Tom Chambers 10; Asts: Kevin Johnson 10	Pts: Byron Scott 30; Rebs: Magic Johnson 9 Asts: Magic Johnson 14
LA Lakers lead series, 2–0

Great Western Forum, Inglewood, California
Attendance: 17,505
Referees: Dick Bavetta, Jess Kersey, Jake O'Donnell

May 26

Boxscore

Los Angeles Lakers 110, Phoenix Suns 107
Scoring by quarter: 25–19, 25–35, 32–21, 28–32
Pts: James Worthy 29; Rebs: James Worthy 12; Asts: Magic Johnson 11	Pts: Tom Chambers 26; Rebs: Jeff Hornacek 11; Asts: Kevin Johnson 13
LA Lakers lead series, 3–0

Arizona Veterans Memorial Coliseum, Phoenix, Arizona
Attendance: 14,471
Referees: Dan Crawford, Darell Garretson, Hue Hollins

May 28

Boxscore

Los Angeles Lakers 122, Phoenix Suns 117
Scoring by quarter: 31–26, 29–23, 27–25, 35–43
Pts: Byron Scott 35; Rebs: A.C. Green 11; Asts: Magic Johnson 20	Pts: Tom Chambers 41; Rebs: Tom Chambers 13; Asts: Kevin Johnson 10
LA Lakers win series, 4–0

Arizona Veterans Memorial Coliseum, Phoenix, Arizona
Attendance: 14,471
Referees: Joe Crawford, Hugh Evans, Paul Mihalak

Regular-season series
Tied 3–3 in the regular-season series

December 7, 1988

Recap

Phoenix Suns 111, Los Angeles Lakers 125

Great Western Forum, Inglewood, California

December 26, 1988

Recap

Los Angeles Lakers 96, Phoenix Suns 111

Arizona Veterans Memorial Coliseum, Phoenix, Arizona

February 1, 1989

Recap

Los Angeles Lakers 97, Phoenix Suns 114

Arizona Veterans Memorial Coliseum, Phoenix, Arizona

February 26, 1989

Recap

Phoenix Suns 122, Los Angeles Lakers 134

Great Western Forum, Inglewood, California

March 26, 1989

Recap

Phoenix Suns 116, Los Angeles Lakers 118

Great Western Forum, Inglewood, California

March 28, 1989

Recap

Los Angeles Lakers 104, Phoenix Suns 127

Arizona Veterans Memorial Coliseum, Phoenix, Arizona

This was the sixth playoff meeting between these two teams, with the Lakers winning the first five meetings.

Previous playoff series
Los Angeles leads 5–0 in all-time playoff series

1970

Los Angeles Lakers 4, Phoenix Suns 3

1970 Western Division Semifinals

1980

Los Angeles Lakers 4, Phoenix Suns 1

1980 Western Conference Semifinals

1982

Los Angeles Lakers 4, Phoenix Suns 0

1982 Western Conference Semifinals

1984

Los Angeles Lakers 4, Phoenix Suns 2

1984 Western Conference Finals

1985

Los Angeles Lakers 3, Phoenix Suns 0

1985 Western Conference First Round

== NBA Finals: (E1) Detroit Pistons vs. (W1) Los Angeles Lakers ==
June 6

Boxscore

Los Angeles Lakers 97, Detroit Pistons 109
Scoring by quarter: 22–28, 26–27, 18–24, 31–30
Pts: Johnson, Worthy 17 each Rebs: A.C. Green 8 Asts: Magic Johnson 14	Pts: Isiah Thomas 24; Rebs: Aguirre, Rodman 10 each Asts: Isiah Thomas 9
Detroit leads series, 1–0

The Palace of Auburn Hills, Auburn Hills, Michigan
Attendance: 21,454
Referees: Jake O'Donnell, Jess Kersey, Jack Madden

June 8

Boxscore

Los Angeles Lakers 105, Detroit Pistons 108
Scoring by quarter: 32–26, 30–30, 30–28, 13–24
Pts: Cooper, Worthy 19 each Rebs: A.C. Green 9 Asts: Magic Johnson 9	Pts: Joe Dumars 33; Rebs: Mark Aguirre 6 Asts: Isiah Thomas 7
Detroit leads series, 2–0

The Palace of Auburn Hills, Auburn Hills, Michigan
Attendance: 21,454
Referees: Darell Garretson, Hue Hollins, Joe Crawford

June 11

Boxscore

Detroit Pistons 114, Los Angeles Lakers 110
Scoring by quarter: 27–22, 30–33, 29–33, 28–22
Pts: Joe Dumars 31; Rebs: Dennis Rodman 19; Asts: Isiah Thomas 8	Pts: James Worthy 26; Rebs: Kareem Abdul-Jabbar 13; Asts: Michael Cooper 13
Detroit leads series, 3–0

Great Western Forum, Inglewood, California
Attendance: 17,505
Referees: Ed T. Rush, Mike Mathis, Hugh Evans

- Joe Dumars blocks David Rivers' potential game-tying 3 with 8 seconds left.

June 13

Boxscore

Detroit Pistons 105, Los Angeles Lakers 97
Scoring by quarter: 23–35, 26–20, 27–23, 29–19
Pts: Joe Dumars 23; Rebs: Johnson, Laimbeer 6 each Asts: three players 5 each	Pts: James Worthy 40; Rebs: A.C. Green 12; Asts: Michael Cooper 9
Detroit wins series, 4–0

Great Western Forum, Inglewood, California
Attendance: 17,505
Referees: Jess Kersey, Jack Madden, Earl Strom

- Kareem Abdul-Jabbar's final NBA game.

Regular-season series
Detroit won 2–0 in the regular-season series

November 26, 1988

Recap

Los Angeles Lakers 99, Detroit Pistons 102

The Palace of Auburn Hills, Auburn Hills, Michigan

February 14, 1989

Recap

Detroit Pistons 111, Los Angeles Lakers 103

Great Western Forum, Inglewood, California

This was the 11th playoff meeting between these two teams, with the Lakers winning nine of the first ten meetings.

Previous playoff series
Los Angeles leads 9–1 in all-time playoff series

1950

Fort Wayne Pistons 0, Minneapolis Lakers 2

1950 Central Division Finals

1953

Fort Wayne Pistons 2, Minneapolis Lakers 3

1953 Western Division Finals

1954

Fort Wayne Pistons 0, Minneapolis Lakers 2

1954 Western Division Round Robin Semifinals

1955

Fort Wayne Pistons 3, Minneapolis Lakers 1

1955 Western Division Finals

1957

Fort Wayne Pistons 0, Minneapolis Lakers 2

1957 Western Division Semifinals

1959

Detroit Pistons 1, Minneapolis Lakers 2

1959 Western Division Semifinals

1960

Detroit Pistons 0, Minneapolis Lakers 2

1960 Western Division Semifinals

1961

Detroit Pistons 2, Los Angeles Lakers 3

1961 Western Division Semifinals

1962

Detroit Pistons 2, Los Angeles Lakers 4

1962 Western Division Finals

1988

Detroit Pistons 3, Los Angeles Lakers 4

1988 NBA Finals

== Statistical leaders ==
Category	Game high			Average			
Category	Player	Team	High	Player	Team	Avg.	GP
Points	Michael Jordan	Chicago Bulls	50	Michael Jordan	Chicago Bulls	34.8	17
Rebounds	Karl Malone	Utah Jazz	22	Karl Malone	Utah Jazz	16.3	3
Assists	Magic Johnson	Los Angeles Lakers	20	John Stockton	Utah Jazz	13.7	3
Steals	Michael Jordan; Byron Scott; Sedale Threatt; John Stockton	Chicago Bulls; Los Angeles Lakers; Seattle SuperSonics; Utah Jazz	6	John Stockton	Utah Jazz	3.3	3
Blocks	Alton Lister	Seattle SuperSonics	8	Manute Bol	Golden State Warriors	3.6	8
