= David Richmond (officer) =

American militia officer (1748–1818)

David Richmond (1748–1818) was an American commissioned officer who served in the American Revolutionary War.

== Early years ==
Richmond, the son of Mayflower descendant Seth Richmond, was born in Taunton, Massachusetts. He married Nancy Davis in 1766.

Richmond had five sons: Joseph, David, Thomas, Samuel and Seth; and four daughters: Lucy, Esther, Lydia and Nancy.

== American Revolutionary War Record ==
From May 1, 1775, to October 1775, Richmond was a lieutenant in Captain John Field's Company, Colonel Daniel Hitchcock's Regiment.

By December 1776, Richmond was a first lieutenant in Captain Timothy Vilmarth's Company, Colonel Chad Brown's Regiment. He was appointed captain on September 30, 1778.

In the summer of 1780, Richmond served one month as a major.

== Post war ==
Major Richmond moved from Rhode Island and settled at Latham's Corners, Chenango County, New York.
