= Tom Richmond =

Tom Richmond may refer to:

- Tom Richmond (cricketer) (1890–1957), England Test cricketer
- Tom Richmond (illustrator) (born 1966), American humorous illustrator and cartoonist
- Tom Richmond (cinematographer) (1950–2022), American cinematographer
- Tom Richmond (Montana politician), member of the Montana Senate
- Thomas Richmond (1802–1874), British portrait painter
- Thomas Richmond (miniature-painter) (1771–1837), English miniature-painter
