= Tim Richmond (photographer) =

British photographer

Tim Richmond (born 25 August 1959 in Hawkhurst, England) is an English photographer. He is most widely known for his filmic style imagery in fashion, reportage and landscape.

== Career ==
After graduating from the London College of Printing, he began his career in portraiture. Some of his early works now make up part of the permanent collection at the National Portrait Gallery. His work then evolved to encompass fashion and reportage for such publications as L'Uomo Vogue, US Vogue, Harpers & Queen, Big, Arena, Wonderland and The Telegraph. International advertising campaigns include Levi's, Gap and Hermes.
