= Mychal Thompson =

Bahamian basketball player (born 1955)

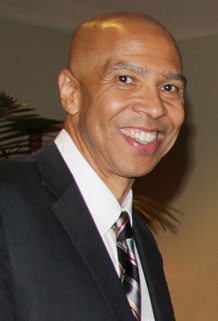
- Thompson in 2012

Personal information
- Born: January 30, 1955 (age 71) Eleuthera, The Bahamas
- Listed height: 6 ft 10 in (2.08 m)
- Listed weight: 226 lb (103 kg)

Career information
- High school: Jackson (Miami, Florida)
- College: Minnesota (1974–1978)
- NBA draft: 1978: 1st round, 1st overall pick
- Drafted by: Portland Trail Blazers
- Playing career: 1978–1992
- Position: Center
- Number: 43, 00

Career history
- 1978–1986: Portland Trail Blazers
- 1986–1987: San Antonio Spurs
- 1987–1991: Los Angeles Lakers
- 1991–1992: Juvecaserta Basket

Career highlights
- 2× NBA champion (1987, 1988); NBA All-Rookie First Team (1979); Consensus first-team All-American (1978); Consensus second-team All-American (1977); 3× First-team All-Big Ten (1976–1978); No. 43 retired by Minnesota Golden Gophers

Career NBA statistics
- Points: 12,810 (13.7 ppg)
- Rebounds: 6,951 (7.4 rpg)
- Blocks: 1,073 (1.1 bpg)
- Stats at NBA.com
- Stats at Basketball Reference

Mychal George Thompson (born January 30, 1955) is a Bahamian-American sports commentator and former professional basketball player. He was the first player born & raised in the Bahamas to make the NBA. The top overall pick in the 1978 NBA draft, Thompson played the center position for the University of Minnesota and center and power forward for the NBA's Portland Trail Blazers, San Antonio Spurs, and Los Angeles Lakers. Thompson won two NBA championships with the Lakers during their Showtime era in the 1980s. He is the father of basketball players Klay Thompson and Mychel Thompson, and baseball player Trayce Thompson.

== Early life ==
Thompson was born to a Catholic family in Nassau, Bahamas, where he grew up playing pickup basketball on the local courts and fostered his love for the game. In his teens, he moved to the United States in order to compete at a higher level. Settling in Miami, Florida, Thompson attended Miami Jackson Senior High School and played for its athletic team the Generals. In Thompson's senior year in 1974, he was part of a basketball starting lineup nicknamed the "Jackson 5" featuring himself, three other Bahamians and a Cuban; the Generals mowed through the regular season that year, beating opponents by an average of 30 points per game en route to a 33–0 record and winning the Class 4A state championship over Winter Park High School. Miami Jackson's team won the title with four key ineligible players due to falsified birth records, including Thompson. Thompson then attended the University of Minnesota where he had a standout collegiate career.

== NBA career ==
The Portland Trail Blazers selected Thompson with the first overall pick in the 1978 NBA draft, making him the first foreign-born player to be selected first.

Thompson was in the Portland lineup for eight years, where he started at both power forward and center positions. He was named to the 1978 All-Rookie team. The following season, Thompson missed the entire year following an ankle injury he suffered in the Bahamas when playing pick-up basketball. He had his best season in 1981–82, where he averaged 20.8 points and 11.7 rebounds per game, earning minor consideration for MVP. In the 1987 off-season, Thompson was traded to the San Antonio Spurs in exchange for center/forward Steve Johnson.

Thompson played only half a season with the Spurs before he was traded again in February 1987, this time to Los Angeles, for center/forward Frank Brickowski, center Pétur Guðmundsson plus a 1987 first-round draft pick and their 1990 second-round draft choice, along with an undisclosed amount of cash. Thompson was acquired as a back-up center and power forward. This gave the Pat Riley-coached Lakers a team that had four players who were overall #1 selections in the NBA draft, including Kareem Abdul-Jabbar (1969), Magic Johnson (1979), and James Worthy (1982). The trade proved valuable to the 1986–87 Lakers, who went on to defeat Boston for the 1987 NBA title. Thompson thrived as Abdul-Jabbar's backup. In Game six of the 1987 NBA Finals, he had 15 points and nine rebounds and played 37 minutes, as the Lakers won the series.

Thompson appeared in 193 of a total of 197 regular season Laker games from the time of his acquisition through the 1988–1989 season, nine of them as a starter. He proved to be a reliable backup during 1987–88 and 1988–89 seasons for the aging Abdul-Jabbar (and later Vlade Divac) and power forward for A.C. Green. The Lakers won another title in 1988, beating the Detroit Pistons, and reached the Finals in 1989, falling to Detroit, and again, in 1991. He retired later that year.

As of 2022, Mychal and his son Klay are one of five father-son duos to have each won an NBA Championship as a player; the others were (in chronological order of completing the feat) Matt Guokas, Sr. and his son Matt Guokas, Jr., Hall of Famer Rick Barry and his son Brent Barry, Hall of Famer Bill Walton and his son Luke Walton, and Hall of Famer Gary Payton and his son Gary Payton II. The Thompsons, along with the Waltons, are also the only father-son tandems to have each won at least two championships, with the Thompsons being the only tandem to each win in two consecutive years.

== NBA career statistics ==
Legend
| GP | Games played | GS | Games started | MPG | Minutes per game |
| FG% | Field goal percentage | 3P% | 3-point field goal percentage | FT% | Free throw percentage |
| RPG | Rebounds per game | APG | Assists per game | SPG | Steals per game |
| BPG | Blocks per game | PPG | Points per game | **Bold** | Career high |
| † | Won an NBA championship |

=== Regular season ===
| Year | Team | GP | GS | MPG | FG% | 3P% | FT% | RPG | APG | SPG | BPG | PPG |
|---|---|---|---|---|---|---|---|---|---|---|---|---|
| 1978–79 | Portland | 73 | — | 29.4 | .490 | — | .572 | 8.3 | 2.4 | .9 | 1.8 | 14.7 |
| 1980–81 | Portland | 79 | — | 35.3 | .494 | .000 | .641 | 8.7 | 3.6 | .8 | **2.2** | 17.0 |
| 1981–82 | Portland | 79 | 78 | **39.6** | .523 | — | .628 | **11.7** | 4.0 | .9 | 1.4 | **20.8** |
| 1982–83 | Portland | 80 | **80** | 37.7 | .489 | .000 | .621 | 9.4 | **4.8** | .9 | 1.4 | 15.7 |
| 1983–84 | Portland | 79 | 74 | 33.5 | .524 | .000 | .667 | 8.7 | 3.9 | **1.1** | 1.4 | 15.7 |
| 1984–85 | Portland | 79 | 55 | 33.1 | .515 | — | .684 | 7.8 | 2.6 | 1.0 | 1.3 | 18.4 |
| 1985–86 | Portland | **82** | 78 | 31.3 | .498 | — | .641 | 7.4 | 2.1 | .9 | .4 | 14.7 |
| 1986–87 | San Antonio | 49 | 6 | 24.7 | .436 | **1.000** | .735 | 5.6 | 1.8 | .6 | .8 | 12.3 |
| 1986–87† | L.A. Lakers | 33 | 1 | 20.6 | .480 | .000 | **.743** | 4.1 | .8 | .4 | .9 | 10.1 |
| 1987–88† | L.A. Lakers | 80 | 0 | 25.1 | .512 | .000 | .634 | 6.1 | .8 | .5 | 1.0 | 11.6 |
| 1988–89 | L.A. Lakers | 80 | 8 | 24.9 | **.559** | .000 | .678 | 5.8 | .6 | .7 | .7 | 9.2 |
| 1989–90 | L.A. Lakers | 70 | 70 | 26.9 | .500 | — | .706 | 6.8 | .6 | .5 | 1.0 | 10.1 |
| 1990–91 | L.A. Lakers | 72 | 4 | 15.0 | .496 | .000 | .705 | 3.2 | .3 | .3 | .3 | 4.0 |
| Career | | 935 | 454 | 29.7 | .504 | .083 | .655 | 7.4 | 2.3 | .7 | 1.1 | 13.7 |

=== Playoffs ===
| Year | Team | GP | GS | MPG | FG% | 3P% | FT% | RPG | APG | SPG | BPG | PPG |
|---|---|---|---|---|---|---|---|---|---|---|---|---|
| 1979 | Portland | 3 | — | 40.3 | .500 | — | .500 | **10.3** | 2.0 | .7 | 1.7 | 19.7 |
| 1981 | Portland | 3 | — | **44.0** | **.608** | — | .722 | 7.7 | 1.3 | 1.0 | **3.0** | **25.0** |
| 1983 | Portland | 7 | — | 40.6 | .471 | — | .658 | 8.0 | **5.6** | .9 | 1.1 | 15.0 |
| 1984 | Portland | 4 | — | 30.3 | .500 | — | **.773** | 7.3 | 3.8 | **1.3** | .8 | 15.3 |
| 1985 | Portland | 9 | 0 | 27.8 | .490 | — | .673 | 8.0 | 1.6 | .8 | 1.3 | 14.8 |
| 1986 | Portland | 4 | 4 | 35.0 | .574 | — | .538 | 8.3 | 3.5 | .3 | .8 | 19.0 |
| 1987† | L.A. Lakers | 18 | 0 | 22.3 | .453 | — | .680 | 4.9 | .5 | .4 | .9 | 8.8 |
| 1988† | L.A. Lakers | **24** | 0 | 25.6 | .513 | — | .581 | 7.1 | .5 | .7 | .9 | 9.7 |
| 1989 | L.A. Lakers | 15 | 0 | 25.1 | .508 | — | .683 | 5.1 | .7 | .4 | .8 | 11.4 |
| 1990 | L.A. Lakers | 9 | **8** | 25.0 | .477 | — | .615 | 4.3 | .2 | .2 | 1.4 | 6.4 |
| 1991 | L.A. Lakers | 8 | 0 | 5.3 | .286 | — | — | 1.1 | .0 | .0 | .4 | .5 |
| Career | | 104 | 12 | 26.0 | .501 | — | .648 | 6.0 | 1.2 | .5 | 1.0 | 10.9 |

== Post-NBA career ==
Thompson and his family moved back to Portland in 1991 after his career. He worked on local sports radio in the area. He and his family relocated back to Los Angeles in 2003 when he was offered a job as a color commentator for the Lakers. He was first a co-host on the "Loose Cannons" radio show on KLAC AM570 in Los Angeles but was let go, due to the move of Lakers broadcasts from AM570 to KSPN AM710 for the 2009–10 season. With the move to KSPN AM710, he joined Andrew Siciliano as co-hosts on the "LA Sports Live" radio show on KSPN AM710 until the show was canceled on December 26, 2010. On June 4, 2015, it was announced that Thompson would be teaming up with Mike Trudell as co-hosts on the show "Thompson & Trudell" on KSPN AM710 until the show was canceled on October 19, 2017.

Thompson is currently employed as the Lakers radio color commentator. He first worked with Joel Meyers, then Spero Dedes, and is currently paired with John Ireland.

== Personal life ==
Thompson married his wife Julie in 1987, and they have three sons, Mychel, Klay, and Trayce. Mychel briefly played in the NBA for the Cleveland Cavaliers, while Klay is a shooting guard for the Miami Heat and has won four NBA championships, and Trayce is an outfielder whose played for 5 MLB teams and plays for the Great Britain national baseball team.

Thompson is nicknamed "sweet bells" after Walt Bellamy, who was nicknamed "bells." Thompson's documentary about his life "Trailblazer: The Mychal Thompson Story" screened at Regal Cinemas at LA Live in Los Angeles on November 21, 2013. Thompson's brother, Andrew (Andy) Thompson, was an executive producer of the Michael Jordan documentary mini-series The Last Dance. Andy Thompson pitched Adam Silver the idea for the documentary while both were working for NBA Entertainment, knowing that Michael Jordan used to write his name as "Mychal Jordan" since he idolized Mychal Thompson.

Thompson once implied he had interest in becoming Bahamian Prime Minister. Before he joined the NBA, some fans believed him to be the cousin of fellow NBA player (and basketball Hall of Fame member) David Thompson. A street in Nassau leading to the Queen Elizabeth Sports Centre was named "Mychal Thompson Boulevard" in his honor during 2015.

As of the 2025–26 season, Thompson is one of seven players born in The Bahamas to appear in an NBA game, and one of only five to be drafted. Thompson was the first and only Bahamian NBA player until Ian Lockhart debuted in 1990 and appeared in only one career game.
