= Eddie Hughes (basketball) =

American basketball player

Personal information
- Born: May 26, 1960 (age 66) Greenville, Mississippi
- Listed height: 5 ft 10 in (1.78 m)
- Listed weight: 165 lb (75 kg)

Career information
- High school: Austin (Chicago, Illinois)
- College: Colorado State (1978–1982)
- NBA draft: 1982: 7th round, 140th overall pick
- Drafted by: San Diego Clippers
- Playing career: 1982–1994
- Position: Point guard
- Number: 25, 15, 1

Career history
- 1982–1983: Wyoming Wildcatters
- 1982–1983: Maine Lumberjacks
- 1983–1984: Bay State Bombardiers
- 1983–1985: Albuquerque Silvers
- 1985–1986: La Crosse Catbirds
- 1986–1987: Pensacola Tornados
- 1988: Utah Jazz
- 1989: Denver Nuggets
- 1989: La Crosse Catbirds
- 1989–1990: Denver Nuggets
- 1990–1991, 1993–1994: La Crosse Catbirds
- 1994: Grand Rapids Hoops

Career highlights
- CBA All-Defensive First Team (1984); First-team All-WAC (1979)
- Stats at NBA.com
- Stats at Basketball Reference

Eddie Hughes (born May 26, 1960) is an American former professional basketball player who played three years in the National Basketball Association (NBA).

== Basketball career ==
A 5-foot-10-inch (178 cm) point guard born in Greenville, Mississippi, Hughes played collegiately at Colorado State University from 1978 to 1982. He was selected in the seventh round of the 1982 NBA draft by the San Diego Clippers.

Hughes' NBA playing career began in 1987 with the Utah Jazz, for whom he played 11 games, averaging 1.5 points and 0.7 assists per game. He then played a total of 86 games with the Denver Nuggets in his second and third seasons, his last year being in 1989–90.

Hughes played in the Continental Basketball Association (CBA) from 1982 to 1987, 1990–91 and 1993–94. He was selected to the CBA All-Defensive First Team in 1984.

== Career statistics ==
Legend
GP	Games played	GS	Games started	MPG	Minutes per game
FG%	Field goal percentage	3P%	3-point field goal percentage	FT%	Free throw percentage
RPG	Rebounds per game	APG	Assists per game	SPG	Steals per game
BPG	Blocks per game	PPG	Points per game	**Bold**	Career high

=== NBA ===
==== Regular season ====
Year	Team	GP	GS	MPG	FG%	3P%	FT%	RPG	APG	SPG	BPG	PPG
1987–88	Utah	11	0	3.8	.385	.167	**1.000**	.4	.7	.0	.0	1.5
1988–89	Denver	26	1	8.6	**.438**	.318	.583	.7	1.3	.7	**.1**	2.7
1989–90	Denver	**60**	**7**	**14.9**	.411	**.408**	.676	**1.2**	**1.9**	**.8**	.0	**3.5**
Career		97	8	11.9	.416	.364	.692	1.0	1.6	.7	.0	3.1

==== Playoffs ====
Year	Team	GP	GS	MPG	FG%	3P%	FT%	RPG	APG	SPG	BPG	PPG
1988	Utah	7	0	2.3	.286	.333	–	.0	.1	.1	.0	.7
