= 1987–88 Los Angeles Lakers season =

Pro basketball team season (won NBA championship)

- NBA champions
- Conference champions
- Division champions
- Head coach: Pat Riley
- General manager: Jerry West
- Owners: Jerry Buss
- Arena: The Forum

Results
- Record: 62–20 (.756)
- Place: Division: 1st (Pacific); Conference: 1st (Western)
- Playoff finish: NBA champions (Defeated Pistons 4–3)
- Stats at Basketball Reference

Local media
- Television: Prime Ticket, KHJ (Chick Hearn, Stu Lantz)
- Radio: AM 570 KLAC (Chick Hearn, Stu Lantz)

The 1987–88 Los Angeles Lakers season was the 42nd season for the Los Angeles Lakers as a franchise, their 40th season in the National Basketball Association (NBA), and their 28th season in Los Angeles, California. The Lakers entered the regular season as the defending NBA champion, having defeated the Boston Celtics in six games in the 1987 NBA Finals; following their championship win, Lakers head coach Pat Riley promised the team would repeat as champions.

== Season summary ==
=== Regular season ===
The Lakers got off to a fast start by winning their first eight games of the regular season, then later on posting a 15-game winning streak between December and January, and holding a 35–8 record at the All-Star break. The Lakers then posted a 10-game winning streak in February, and won the Pacific Division title with a league-best 62–20 record, which earned them the first seed in the Western Conference; the team qualified for the NBA playoffs for the twelfth consecutive year.

Byron Scott led the Lakers in scoring averaging 21.7 points, 4.1 assists and 1.9 steals per game, while James Worthy averaged 19.7 points, 5.0 rebounds and 3.9 assists per game, and Magic Johnson provided the team with 19.6 points, 6.2 rebounds, 11.9 assists and 1.6 steals per game, and was named to the All-NBA First Team. In addition, Kareem Abdul-Jabbar contributed 14.6 points, 6.0 rebounds and 1.2 blocks per game, while A.C. Green provided with 11.4 points and 8.7 rebounds per game. Off the bench, Mychal Thompson averaged 11.6 points and 6.1 rebounds per game, while defensive guard Michael Cooper contributed 8.7 points and 4.7 assists per game, and was named to the NBA All-Defensive First Team, Wes Matthews provided with 5.7 points and 2.7 assists per game, and Kurt Rambis averaged 4.0 points and 3.8 rebounds per game.

During the NBA All-Star weekend at the Chicago Stadium in Chicago, Illinois, Johnson, Worthy and Abdul-Jabbar were all selected for the 1988 NBA All-Star Game, as members of the Western Conference All-Star team, while Riley was selected to coach the Western Conference. Johnson scored 17 points along with 19 assists and 2 steals, despite the Western Conference losing to the Eastern Conference, 138–133. Meanwhile, Scott participated in the NBA Three-Point Shootout for the second consecutive year. Johnson also finished in third place in Most Valuable Player voting, behind Michael Jordan of the Chicago Bulls, and Larry Bird of the Boston Celtics; Scott finished tied in eighth place in Most Improved Player voting, while Cooper finished tied in fifth place in Defensive Player of the Year voting, and Riley finished in second place in Coach of the Year voting, behind Doug Moe of the Denver Nuggets.

The Lakers finished third in the NBA in home-game attendance, with an attendance of 708,477 at the Great Western Forum during the regular season.

=== NBA playoffs ===
In the Western Conference First Round of the 1988 NBA playoffs, and before the Lakers could make good on Riley's guarantee, the team faced off against the 8th–seeded San Antonio Spurs, a team that featured All-Star guard Alvin Robertson, second-year star Walter Berry, and Frank Brickowski. The Lakers won the first two games over the Spurs at home at the Great Western Forum, before winning Game 3 on the road, 109–107 at the HemisFair Arena to win the series in a three-game sweep.

In the Western Conference Semi-finals, the Lakers faced off against the 5th–seeded Utah Jazz, who were led by the trio of All-Star forward Karl Malone, sixth man Thurl Bailey, and John Stockton. The Lakers won Game 1 over the Jazz at the Great Western Forum, 110–91, but then lost the next two games, which included a Game 3 road loss to the Jazz at the Salt Palace, 96–89, as the Jazz took a 2–1 series lead. The Lakers managed to win the next two games before losing Game 6 to the Jazz at the Salt Palace, 108–80. With the series tied at 3–3, the Lakers won Game 7 over the Jazz at the Great Western Forum, 109–98 to win in a hard-fought seven-game series.

In the Western Conference Finals, the Lakers then faced off against the 3rd–seeded Dallas Mavericks, a team that featured the quartet of All-Star forward Mark Aguirre, Rolando Blackman, Derek Harper and All-Star center James Donaldson. The Lakers won the first two games over the Mavericks at the Great Western Forum, and took a 2–0 series lead. However, the team lost the next two games on the road, including a Game 4 loss to the Mavericks at the Reunion Arena, 118–104. The Lakers won Game 5 at the Great Western Forum, 119–102, but then lost Game 6 to the Mavericks at the Reunion Arena, 105–103. With the series tied at 3–3, the Lakers won Game 7 over the Mavericks at the Great Western Forum, 117–102 to win in another hard-fought seven-game series, and advance to the NBA Finals for the second consecutive year.

In the 1988 NBA Finals, the Lakers faced off against the 2nd–seeded Detroit Pistons, who were led by the trio of All-Star guard Isiah Thomas, Adrian Dantley and Joe Dumars. The Lakers lost Game 1 to the Pistons at home, 105–93 at the Great Western Forum, but managed to win the next two games, which included a Game 3 win over the Pistons on the road, 99–86 at the Pontiac Silverdome. However, the Lakers lost the next two games, including a Game 5 loss to the Pistons at the Pontiac Silverdome, 104–94 as the Pistons took a 3–2 series lead. The Lakers managed to win their next two home games at the Great Western Forum, winning Game 6 over the Pistons by a score of 103–102, and then winning Game 7 by a score of 108–105 to win in another hard-fought seven-game series, winning their second consecutive NBA championship, and eleventh overall; Worthy, who had a triple-double of 36 points, 16 rebounds and 10 assists in Game 7, was named the NBA Finals Most Valuable Player. The Lakers also became the NBA's first repeat champions since the Boston Celtics did it in the 1968–69 NBA season.

By the time the Lakers had finished their season, they had played an NBA record of 106 games, including another record of 24 playoff games, winning 77 and losing 29; the team went 62–20 in the regular season and 15–9 in the playoffs, en route to their sixth NBA championship in Los Angeles, and their eleventh overall in franchise history.

In 2024, HoopsHype ranked the 1987–88 Lakers as the team with the 13th easiest route to the NBA Finals championship (in terms of team records of their opponents), primarily due to the record that the Spurs had this season. The 1988 NBA Finals was the last time that the Showtime-era Lakers won an NBA championship; it was also the final time that the franchise won a championship at the Great Western Forum. The Lakers did not win another championship until 2000, when they were playing at the Staples Center (now known as the Crypto.com Arena).

=== Aftermath ===
Following the season, Rambis signed as a free agent with the Charlotte Hornets expansion team.

== Draft picks ==
Round	Pick	Player	Position	Nationality	College
3	69	Willie Glass	Forward	United States	St. John's
4	92	Ralph Tally	Point Guard	United States	Norfolk State
6	115	Kenny Travis		United States	New Mexico State
6	138	Frank Ford	Guard-Forward	United States	Auburn University
7	161	Ron Vanderschaaf	Center	Netherlands	Central Washington University

== Roster ==
Los Angeles Lakers roster
Players

Pos.	No.	Player	Height	Weight	DOB	From
C	33	Kareem Abdul-Jabbar	7 ft 2 in (2.18 m)	225 lb (102 kg)		UCLA
SF	19	Tony Campbell	6 ft 7 in (2.01 m)	215 lb (98 kg)		Ohio State
SG	21	Michael Cooper	6 ft 5 in (1.96 m)	170 lb (77 kg)		New Mexico
PF	45	A.C. Green	6 ft 9 in (2.06 m)	220 lb (100 kg)		Oregon State
PG	32	Magic Johnson	6 ft 9 in (2.06 m)	215 lb (98 kg)		Michigan State
SF	3	Jeff Lamp	6 ft 6 in (1.98 m)	195 lb (88 kg)		Virginia
PG	1	Wes Matthews	6 ft 1 in (1.85 m)	170 lb (77 kg)		Wisconsin
PF	31	Kurt Rambis	6 ft 8 in (2.03 m)	213 lb (97 kg)		Santa Clara
SG	4	Byron Scott	6 ft 3 in (1.91 m)	195 lb (88 kg)		Arizona State
C	52	Mike Smrek	7 ft 0 in (2.13 m)	250 lb (113 kg)		Canisius
SF	55	Billy Thompson	6 ft 7 in (2.01 m)	195 lb (88 kg)		Louisville
C	43	Mychal Thompson	6 ft 10 in (2.08 m)	226 lb (103 kg)		Minnesota
PF	34	Ray Tolbert	6 ft 9 in (2.06 m)	225 lb (102 kg)		Indiana
SG	20	Milt Wagner	6 ft 5 in (1.96 m)	185 lb (84 kg)		Louisville
SF	00, 42	James Worthy	6 ft 9 in (2.06 m)	225 lb (102 kg)		North Carolina

Coaches
Head coach
- Pat Riley (Kentucky)
Assistant(s)
- Bill Bertka
- Randy Pfund (Wheaton (IL))

Legend
- (DP) Unsigned draft pick
- (FA) Free agent
- (S) Suspended
- Injured

== Regular season ==
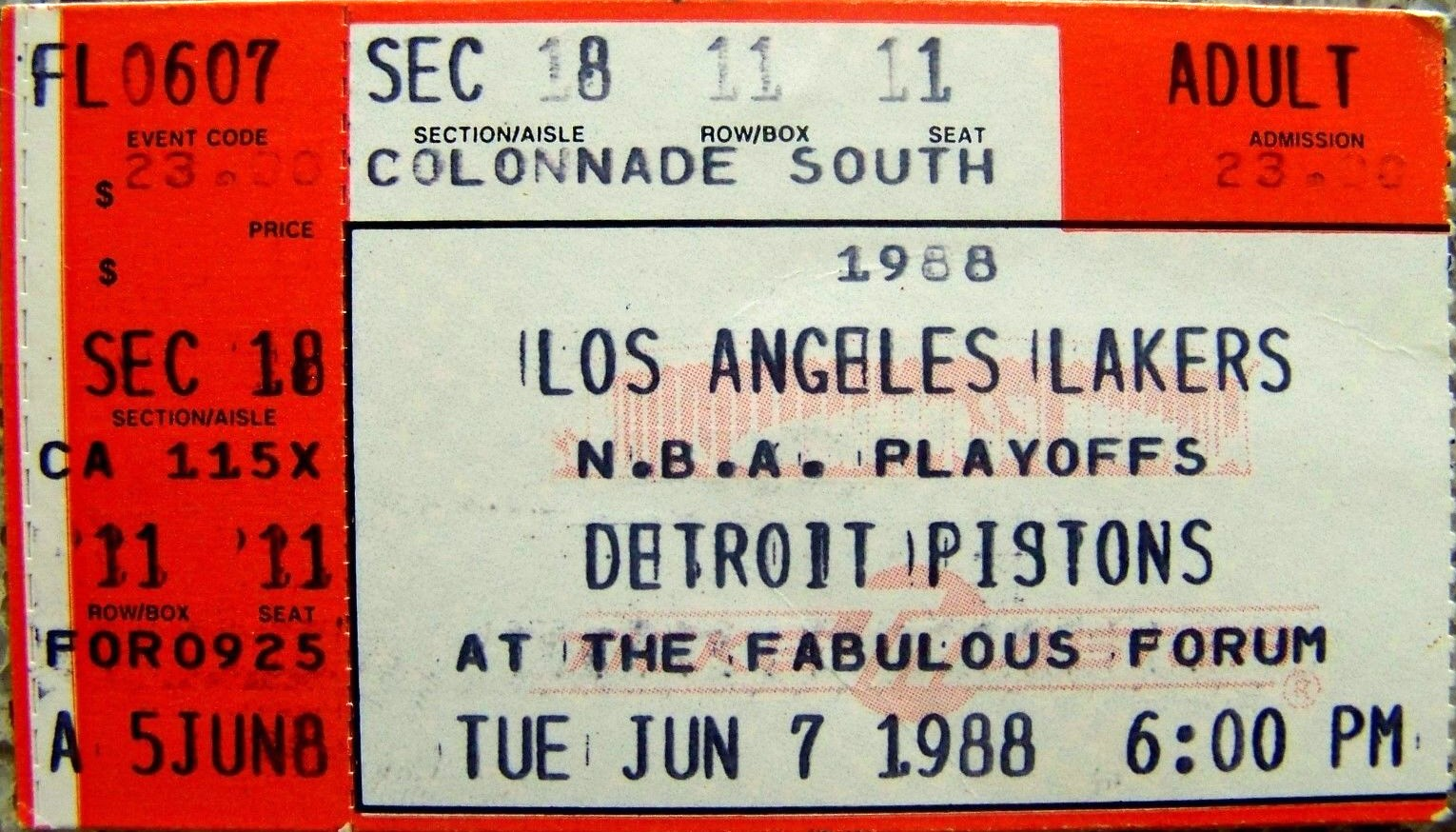
A ticket for Game 1 of the 1988 NBA Finals at The Forum.

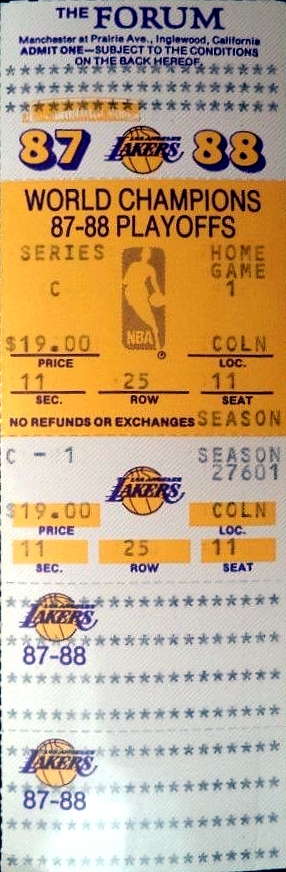
A ticket for Game 1 of the 1988 Western Conference Finals between the Lakers and the Dallas Mavericks.

=== Season standings ===
Pacific Division	W	L	PCT	GB	Home	Road	Div
y-Los Angeles Lakers	62	20	.756	–	36–5	26–15	23–7
x-Portland Trail Blazers	53	29	.646	9	33–8	20–21	23–7
x-Seattle SuperSonics	44	38	.537	18	32–9	12–29	19–11
Phoenix Suns	28	54	.341	34	22–19	6–35	11–19
Golden State Warriors	20	62	.244	42	16–25	4–37	7–23
Los Angeles Clippers	17	65	.207	45	14–27	3–38	7–23

#	Western Conference				
#	Team	W	L	PCT	GB
1	z-Los Angeles Lakers	62	20	.756	–
2	y-Denver Nuggets	54	28	.659	8
3	x-Dallas Mavericks	53	29	.646	9
4	x-Portland Trail Blazers	53	29	.646	9
5	x-Utah Jazz	47	35	.573	15
6	x-Houston Rockets	46	36	.561	16
7	x-Seattle SuperSonics	44	38	.537	18
8	x-San Antonio Spurs	31	51	.378	31
9	Phoenix Suns	28	54	.341	34
10	Sacramento Kings	24	58	.293	38
11	Golden State Warriors	20	62	.244	42
12	Los Angeles Clippers	17	65	.207	45

z – clinched division title
y – clinched division title
x – clinched playoff spot

=== Record vs. opponents ===
==== vs. Eastern Conference ====
vs. Atlantic Division

1987–88 NBA records
Team	BOS	NJN	NYK	PHI	WSB	Total
Golden State	0–2	2–0	0–2	1–1	0–2	3–7
L.A. Clippers	0–2	0–2	0–2	1–1	0–2	1–9
L.A. Lakers	2–0	2–0	2–0	2–0	1–1	9–1
Phoenix	0–2	1–1	2–0	1–1	0–2	4–8
Portland	0–2	2–0	1–1	1–1	2–0	6–6
Seattle	1–1	2–0	2–0	1–1	2–0	8–2

vs. Central Division

1987–88 NBA records
Team	ATL	CHI	CLE	DET	IND	MIL	Total
Golden State	0–2	0–2	2–0	0–2	0–2	0–2	2–10
L.A. Clippers	0–2	0–2	1–1	1–1	1–1	0–2	3–9
L.A. Lakers	2–0	1–1	1–1	2–0	1–1	0–2	7–5
Phoenix	1–1	0–2	1–1	0–2	0–2	1–1	3–9
Portland	2–0	1–1	1–1	1–1	2–0	1–1	8–4
Seattle	0–2	1–1	1–1	1–1	1–1	1–1	5–7

==== vs. Western Conference ====
vs. Midwest Division

1987–88 NBA records
Team	DAL	DEN	HOU	SAC	SAS	UTA	Total
Golden State	1–4	1–4	0–5	2–3	3–2	1–4	8–22
L.A. Clippers	0–5	0–5	2–3	3–2	0–5	1–4	6–24
L.A. Lakers	4–1	2–3	4–1	4–1	5–0	4–1	23–7
Phoenix	0–5	2–3	1–4	3–2	2–3	2–3	10–20
Portland	2–3	3–2	1–4	4–1	5–0	1–4	16–14
Seattle	2–3	1–4	2–3	4–1	2–3	1–4	12–18

vs. Pacific Division

1987–88 NBA records
Team	GSW	LAC	LAL	PHO	POR	SEA	Total
Golden State	—	3–3	0–6	2–4	1–5	1–5	7–23
L.A. Clippers	3–3	—	2–4	1–5	0–6	1–5	7–23
L.A. Lakers	6–0	5–1	—	5–1	3–3	4–2	23–7
Phoenix	4–2	4–2	1–5	—	0–6	2–4	11–19
Portland	5–1	6–0	3–3	6–0	—	3–3	23–7
Seattle	5–1	5–1	2–4	3–3	4–2	—	19–11

== Game log ==
=== Regular season ===
1987–88 game log
Total: 62–20 (Home: 36–5; Road: 26–15)
November: 9–2 (home: 7–1; road: 2–1)

Game	Date	Team	Score	High points	High rebounds	High assists	Location Attendance	Record
1	November 6; 7:30 p.m. PST	Seattle	W 113–109	Johnson (26)	Green (12)	Johnson (8)	The Forum; 17,505	1–0
2	November 8; 7:30 pm PST	Houston	W 101–92	Johnson & Scott (23)	A.C. Green (18)	Magic Johnson (12)	The Forum; 17,505	2–0
3	November 10; 5:30 pm PST	@ San Antonio	W 133–124	A.C. Green (32)	A.C. Green (10)	Magic Johnson (13)	HemisFair Arena; 13,751	3–0
4	November 12; 7:30 pm PST	L.A. Clippers	W 111–82	James Worthy (20)	Abdul-Jabbar & M. Thompson (10)	Magic Johnson (11)	The Forum; 15,569	4–0
5	November 14; 7:30 pm PST	@ Golden State	W 118–110	Byron Scott (27)	Mychal Thompson (9)	Magic Johnson (12)	Oakland-Alameda County Coliseum Arena; 15,025	5–0
6	November 15; 7:30 pm PST	San Antonio	W 147–130	Magic Johnson (25)	A.C. Green (13)	Johnson & Worthy (10)	The Forum; 17,505	6–0
7	November 17; 7:30 p.m. PST	Portland	W 142–115	Mychal ThompsonM Thompson (24)	Green, Rambis (10)	Johnson (14)	The Forum; 16,347	7–0
8	November 20; 7:30 p.m. PST	Dallas	W 119–116	Scott (25)	Green (11)	Johnson (15)	The Forum; 17,505	8–0
9	November 22; 7:30 p.m. PST	Milwaukee	L 116–124 (OT)	Johnson (26)	Green (11)	Johnson (11)	The Forum; 17,505	8–1
10	November 24; 7:30 p.m. PST	@ Seattle	L 85–103	Johnson (23)	Green (10)	Johnson (6)	Seattle Center Coliseum; 14,634	8–2
11	November 27; 7:30 p.m. PST	Denver	W 127–119	Green (28)	Green (16)	Johnson (16)	The Forum; 17,505	9–2

December: 11–4 (home: 5–1; road: 6–3)

Game	Date	Team	Score	High points	High rebounds	High assists	Location Attendance	Record
12	December 1; 7:30 pm PST	@ Sacramento	W 125–120 (OT)	Kareem Abdul-Jabbar (27)	A.C. Green (15)	Magic Johnson (10)	ARCO Arena I 10,333	10–2
13	December 2; 7:30 pm PST	Portland	L 104–117	Michael Cooper (17)	A.C. Green (13)	Cooper & Johnson (9)	The Forum; 17,505	10–3
14	December 4; 5:00 p.m. PST	@ Milwaukee	L 83–85	Johnson (22)	Johnson (10)	Johnson (12)	MECCA Arena; 11,052	10–4
15	December 5; 4:30 p.m. PST	@ Cleveland	L 95–97	Abdul-Jabbar, Johnson, Scott (19)	Green, Johnson (9)	Johnson (9)	Richfield Coliseum; 20,015	10–5
16	December 8; 4:30 pm PST	@ New Jersey	W 98–81	Byron Scott (21)	Magic Johnson (13)	Magic Johnson (14)	Brendan Byrne Arena; 18,008	11–5
17	December 9; 4:30 p.m. PST	@ Washington	L 112–120 (OT)	Johnson (30)	Cooper (12)	Johnson (14)	Capital Centre; 18,643	11–6
18	December 11; 5:00 p.m. PST	@ Boston	W 115–114	Abdul-Jabbar (23)	Abdul-Jabbar, Johnson (8)	Johnson (17)	Boston Garden; 14,890	12–6
19	December 13; 7:30 p.m. PST	Cleveland	W 90–89	Worthy (20)	Green (11)	Johnson (8)	The Forum; 17,505	13–6
20	December 15; 7:30 pm PST	Phoenix	W 122–97	Byron Scott (31)	A.C. Green (14)	Johnson & Scott (9)	The Forum; 17,371	14–6
21	December 17; 7:30 pm PST	@ Golden State	L 113–106	Magic Johnson (31)	A.C. Green (12)	Magic Johnson (17)	Oakland-Alameda County Coliseum Arena; 15,025	15–6
22	December 19; 7:30 pm PST	@ L.A. Clippers	W 108–97	Magic Johnson (28)	A.C. Green (12)	Cooper & Johnson (7)	Los Angeles Memorial Sports Arena; 14,417	16–6
23	December 20; 7:30 p.m. PST	Seattle	W 103–94	M. Thompson (22)	Green (9)	Johnson (12)	The Forum; 17,505	17–6
24	December 23; 7:30 pm PST	Sacramento	W 117–103	Magic Johnson (26)	Green & M. Thompson (9)	Michael Cooper (9)	The Forum; 17,505	18–6
25	December 26; 1:00 p.m. PST	@ Utah	W 117–109	Scott (26)	Abdul-Jabbar (9)	Johnson (14)	Salt Palace; 12,212	19–6
26	December 29; 7:30 pm PST	Philadelphia	W 131–115	Byron Scott (37)	Kurt Rambis (10)	Magic Johnson (17)	The Forum; 17,505	20–6

January: 13–2 (home: 7–0; road: 6–2)

Game	Date	Team	Score	High points	High rebounds	High assists	Location Attendance	Record
27	January 3; 5:00 pm PST	@ Portland	W 98–81	Byron Scott (31)	A.C. Green (10)	Magic Johnson (9)	Memorial Coliseum; 12,666	21–6
28	January 4; 7:30 pm PST	San Antonio	W 133–115	James Worthy (23)	Magic Johnson (8)	Magic Johnson (13)	The Forum; 17,505	22–6
29	January 6; 7:30 p.m. PST	Dallas	W 103–89	Scott (28)	Green (9)	Johnson (15)	The Forum; 17,505	23–6
30	January 8; 5:00 p.m. PST	@ Detroit	W 106–104	Scott (35)	Worthy (8)	Johnson (9)	Pontiac Silverdome; 40,278	24–6
31	January 9; 4:30 pm PST	@ Indiana	W 101–98	Johnson & Worthy (21)	A.C. Green (12)	Magic Johnson (13)	Market Square Arena; 16,912	25–6
32	January 12; 7:30 pm PST	Golden State	W 117–113	Byron Scott (30)	A.C. Green (11)	Magic Johnson (14)	The Forum; 17,505	26–6
33	January 13; 7:30 pm PST	@ L.A. Clippers	L 109–110 (OT)	Magic Johnson (27)	Magic Johnson (11)	Magic Johnson (13)	Los Angeles Memorial Sports Arena; 14,906	26–7
34	January 16; 6:30 pm PST	@ Phoenix	W 107–96	James Worthy (25)	A.C. Green (8)	Magic Johnson (9)	Arizona Veterans Memorial Coliseum; 14,471	27–7
35	January 18; 2:00 pm PST	Houston	W 121–110	Magic Johnson (39)	A.C. Green (9)	Magic Johnson (17)	The Forum; 17,505	28–7
36	January 21; 6:30 p.m. PST	@ Denver	L 113–115	Worthy (22)	Green, Johnson (10)	Johnson (14)	McNichols Sports Arena; 17,022	28–8
37	January 22; 7:30 pm PST	New York	W 113–112	Kareem Abdul-Jabbar (24)	A.C. Green (9)	Johnson & Scott (8)	The Forum; 17,505	29–8
38	January 24; 12:30 p.m. PST	@ Seattle	W 116–109	Johnson (34)	Worthy (12)	Worthy (7)	Seattle Center Coliseum; 14,739	30–8
39	January 26; 7:30 p.m. PST	Utah	W 111–100	Johnson (22)	Worthy (10)	Johnson (11)	The Forum; 17,505	31–8
40	January 28; 7:30 pm PST	@ Sacramento	W 115–94	James Worthy (26)	A.C. Green (13)	Magic Johnson (9)	ARCO Arena I 10,333	32–8
41	January 29; 7:30 p.m. PST	Atlanta	W 117–107	Worthy (29)	Green (8)	Johnson (13)	The Forum; 17,505	33–8

February: 12–1 (home: 7–1; road: 5–0)

Game	Date	Team	Score	High points	High rebounds	High assists	Location Attendance	Record
42	February 2; 7:30 p.m. PST	Chicago	W 110–101	Worthy (25)	Abdul-Jabbar (8)	Johnson (11)	The Forum; 17,505	34–8
43	February 4	@ L.A. Clippers	W 117–86	Byron Scott (21)	Abdul-Jabbar & Johnson (10)	Magic Johnson (11)	Los Angeles Memorial Sports Arena; 15,371	35–8
All-Star Break
44	February 9; 7:30 pm PST	Indiana	L 108–110	James Worthy (30)	Green & Worthy (8)	Magic Johnson (11)	The Forum; 17,505	35–9
45	February 11; 6:30 p.m. PST	@ Denver	W 120–108	Johnson (26)	Green (14)	Cooper (9)	McNichols Sports Arena; 17,022	36–9
46	February 12; 5:30 pm PST	@ San Antonio	W 133–132	Scott & Worthy (23)	Magic Johnson (9)	Magic Johnson (13)	HemisFair Arena; 15,770	37–9
47	February 14; 12:30 p.m. PST	Boston	W 115–106	Scott (38)	M. Thompson (11)	Johnson (14)	The Forum; 17,505	38–9
48	February 16; 7:30 pm PST	L.A. Clippers	W 119–100	Byron Scott (30)	Mychal Thompson (9)	Magic Johnson (12)	The Forum; 17,505	39–9
49	February 18; 5:30 pm PST	@ Houston	W 111–96	Byron Scott (27)	A.C. Green (10)	Magic Johnson (13)	The Summit; 16,611	40–9
50	February 19; 5:00 p.m. PST	@ Atlanta	W 126–119 (OT)	Worthy (38)	Green (11)	Johnson (19)	The Omni; 16,451	41–9
51	February 21; 12:30 p.m. PST	Detroit	W 117–110	Worthy (24)	Scott, M. Thompson (8)	Johnson (13)	The Forum; 17,505	42–9
52	February 23; 7:30 p.m. PST	Washington	W 111–100	Worthy (23)	M. Thompson (9)	Johnson (12)	The Forum; 17,505	43–9
53	February 26; 7:30 p.m. PST	Utah	W 112–105	Johnson (27)	M. Thompson (10)	Johnson (17)	The Forum; 17,505	44–9
54	February 28; 7:30 pm PST	Phoenix	W 111–97	Byron Scott (30)	Mychal Thompson (7)	Magic Johnson (15)	The Forum; 17,505	45–9

March: 8–7 (home: 4–2; road: 4–5)

Game	Date	Team	Score	High points	High rebounds	High assists	Location Attendance	Record
55	March 1; 7:30 p.m. PST	@ Seattle	L 100–114	Scott (21)	Green (16)	Johnson (13)	Seattle Center Coliseum; 14,850	45–10
56	March 4; 7:30 pm PST	Golden State	W 120–107	Byron Scott (30)	A.C. Green (11)	Magic Johnson (10)	The Forum; 17,505	46–10
57	March 6; 11:00 a.m. PST	@ Dallas	W 108–97	Scott (28)	Green (12)	Johnson (16)	Reunion Arena; 17,007	47–10
58	March 7; 4:30 pm PST	@ Philadelphia	W 110–104	Magic Johnson (24)	Magic Johnson (11)	Magic Johnson (17)	The Spectrum; 18,168	48–10
59	March 9; 5:00 pm PST	@ New York	W 104–99	Magic Johnson (26)	Magic Johnson (14)	Magic Johnson (9)	Madison Square Garden; 19,591	49–10
60	March 10; 5:30 p.m. PST	@ Chicago	L 107–128	James Worthy (21)	Green, M. Thompson (12)	Milt Wagner (6)	Chicago Stadium; 18,676	49–11
61	March 12; 8:00 p.m. PST	Dallas	L 101–110	Scott (35)	M. Thompson (11)	Scott (10)	The Forum; 17,505	49–12
62	March 14; 7:30 pm PST	New Jersey	W 115–105	Byron Scott (21)	Kurt Rambis (6)	Wes Matthews (11)	The Forum; 17,505	50–12
63	March 15; 7:30 pm PST	@ Portland	L 95–112	James Worthy (21)	A.C. Green (11)	Michael Cooper (5)	Memorial Coliseum; 12,666	50–13
64	March 19; 6:30 pm PST	@ Phoenix	L 97–102	Mychal Thompson (21)	Kareem Abdul-Jabbar (12)	Matthews & Scott (7)	Arizona Veterans Memorial Coliseum; 14,471	50–14
65	March 20; 7:30 pm PST	@ Golden State	W 130–127	Byron Scott (29)	Mychal Thompson (10)	Wes Matthews (13)	Oakland-Alameda County Coliseum Arena; 15,025	51–14
66	March 22; 7:30 pm PST	Houston	W 117–95	Byron Scott (21)	A.C. Green (10)	Magic Johnson (12)	The Forum; 17,505	52–14
67	March 25; 7:30 p.m. PST	Denver	L 119–120	Worthy (24)	Green (13)	Scott (10)	The Forum; 17,505	52–15
68	March 26; 7:30 pm PST	@ Sacramento	L 92–114	Byron Scott (26)	James Worthy (9)	Wes Matthews (5)	ARCO Arena I 10,333	52–16
69	March 29; 7:30 p.m. PST	Utah	W 122–111	Worthy (31)	Rambis (12)	Matthews (13)	The Forum; 17,505	53–16

April: 9–4 (home: 6–0; road: 3–4)

Game	Date	Team	Score	High points	High rebounds	High assists	Location Attendance	Record
70	April 2; 6:30 p.m. PST	@ Utah	L 92–106	Scott (23)	M. Thomspn (10)	Matthews (7)	Salt Palace; 12,444	53–17
71	April 3; 7:30 pm PDT	Sacramento	W 108–104	James Worthy (24)	Mychal Thompson (7)	Wes Matthews (10)	The Forum; 17,505	54–17
72	April 5; 7:30 p.m. PDT	Seattle	W 94–90	Worthy (28)	Worthy (8)	Worthy (4)	The Forum; 17,505	55–17
73	April 8; 7:30 pm PDT	L.A. Clippers	W 126–107	Campbell & Scott (20)	Kurt Rambis (15)	Magic Johnson (9)	The Forum; 17,505	56–17
74	April 9; 7:30 pm PDT	@ Portland	L 109–119	James Worthy (22)	Kurt Rambis (6)	Magic Johnson (12)	Memorial Coliseum; 12,666	56–18
75	April 12; 7:30 pm PDT	Portland	W 109–103	Scott & Worthy (25)	Mychal Thompson (13)	Magic Johnson (13)	The Forum; 17,505	57–18
76	April 13; 6:30 p.m. PDT	@ Denver	L 106–120	Campbell (16)	Johnson (11)	Johnson (10)	McNichols Sports Arena; 17,022	57–19
77	April 15; 7:30 pm PDT	Phoenix	W 117–114	Magic Johnson (31)	Mychal Thompson (9)	Magic Johnson (15)	The Forum; 17,505	58–19
78	April 17; 10:00 am PDT	@ Houston	L 119–127	Scott & M. Thompson (22)	Magic Johnson (10)	Magic Johnson (12)	The Summit; 16,611	58–20
79	April 19; 5:30 pm PDT	@ San Antonio	W 133–126	James Worthy (28)	A.C. Green (10)	Magic Johnson (9)	HemisFair Arena; 12,456	59–20
80	April 20; 5:30 p.m. PDT	@ Dallas	W 114–107	Scott (31)	M. Thompson (11)	Johnson (23)	Reunion Arena; 17,007	60–20
81	April 22; 7:30 pm PDT	@ Phoenix	W 117–112	Mychal Thompson (24)	A.C. Green (11)	Magic Johnson (17)	Arizona Veterans Memorial Coliseum; 14,077	61–20
82	April 24; 12:30 pm PDT	Golden State	W 136–100	Tony Campbell (28)	Kurt Rambis (11)	Wes Matthews (10)	The Forum; 17,505	62–20

1987–88 schedule

=== Playoffs ===
1988 playoff game log
Total: 15–9 (Home: 12–2; Road: 3–7)
First Round: 3–0 (home: 2–0; road: 1–0)

Game	Date	Team	Score	High points	High rebounds	High assists	Location Attendance	Series
1	April 29; 7:30 pm PDT	San Antonio	W 122–110	James Worthy (22)	Mychal Thompson (14)	Magic Johnson (18)	The Forum; 17,505	1–0
2	May 1; 7:30 pm PDT	San Antonio	W 130–112	Mychal Thompson (29)	Mychal Thompson (16)	Magic Johnson (15)	The Forum; 17,505	2–0
3	May 3; 5:30 pm PDT	@ San Antonio	W 109–107	Magic Johnson (25)	James Worthy (11)	Magic Johnson (11)	HemisFair Arena; 11,542	3–0

Western Conference Semifinals: 4–3 (home: 3–1; road: 1–2)

Game	Date	Team	Score	High points	High rebounds	High assists	Location Attendance	Series
1	May 8; 12:30 p.m. PDT	Utah	W 110–91	Worthy (23)	Abdul-Jabbar (10)	Johnson (9)	The Forum; 17,505	1–0
2	May 10; 8:00 p.m. PDT	Utah	L 97–101	Scott (26)	M. Thompson (12)	Johnson (10)	The Forum; 17,505	1–1
3	May 13; 8:00 p.m. PDT	@ Utah	L 89–96	Scott (29)	M. Thompson (12)	Johnson (6)	Salt Palace; 12,444	1–2
4	May 15; 12:30 p.m. PDT	@ Utah	W 113–100	Worthy (29)	Abdul-Jabbar (11)	Johnson (9)	Salt Palace; 12,444	2–2
5	May 17; 7:30 p.m. PDT	Utah	W 111–109	Worthy (27)	M. Thompson (11)	Johnson (13)	The Forum; 17,505	3–2
6	May 19; 7:30 p.m. PDT	@ Utah	L 80–108	Scott (16)	M. Thompson (9)	Johnson (9)	Salt Palace; 12,444	3–3
7	May 21; 12:30 p.m. PDT	Utah	W 109–98	Scott (29)	Johnson (9)	Johnson (16)	The Forum; 17,505	4–3

Western Conference Finals: 4–3 (home: 4–0; road: 0–3)

Game	Date	Team	Score	High points	High rebounds	High assists	Location Attendance	Series
1	May 23; 7:30 p.m. PDT	Dallas	W 113–98	Worthy (28)	Green, Johnson, M Thompson (6)	Johnson (12)	The Forum; 17,505	1–0
2	May 25; 7:30 p.m. PDT	Dallas	W 123–101	Scott (30)	Abdul-Jabbar (7)	Johnson (19)	The Forum; 17,505	2–0
3	May 27; 5:00 p.m. PDT	@ Dallas	L 94–106	Worthy (19)	Johnson (8)	Johnson (10)	Reunion Arena; 17,007	2–1
4	May 29; 12:30 p.m. PDT	@ Dallas	L 104–118	Johnson (28)	Green (12)	Johnson (12)	Reunion Arena; 17,007	2–2
5	May 31; 8:30 p.m. PDT	Dallas	W 119–102	Worthy (28)	Green (10)	Johnson (20)	The Forum; 17,505	3–2
6	June 2; 6:00 p.m. PDT	@ Dallas	L 103–105	Scott, Worthy (27)	Worthy (11)	Johnson (12)	Reunion Arena; 17,007	3–3
7	June 4; 12:30 p.m. PDT	Dallas	W 117–102	Worthy (28)	Johnson (9)	Johnson (11)	The Forum; 17,505	4–3

NBA Finals: 4–3 (home: 3–1; road: 1–2)

Game	Date	Team	Score	High points	High rebounds	High assists	Location Attendance	Series
1	June 7; 6:00 p.m. PDT	Detroit	L 93–105	Johnson (28)	Green (12)	Johnson (10)	The Forum; 17,505	0–1
2	June 9; 6:00 p.m. PDT	Detroit	W 108–96	Worthy (26)	Green (13)	Johnson (11)	The Forum; 17,505	1–1
3	June 12; 12:30 pm PDT	@ Detroit	W 99–86	Worthy (24)	Worthy (9)	Johnson (14)	Pontiac Silverdome; 39,188	2–1
4	June 14; 6:00 p.m. PDT	@ Detroit	L 86–111	Johnson (23)	Green (10)	Johnson (6)	Pontiac Silverdome; 34,297	2–2
5	June 16; 6:00 p.m. PDT	@ Detroit	L 94–104	Abdul-Jabbar (26)	Abdul-Jabbar, Green, Johnson (6)	Johnson (17)	Pontiac Silverdome; 41,372	2–3
6	June 19; 12:30 p.m. PDT	Detroit	W 103–102	Worthy (28)	Green (10)	Johnson (19)	The Forum; 17,505	3–3
7	June 21; 6:00 p.m. PDT	Detroit	W 108–105	Worthy (36)	Worthy (16)	Johnson (14)	The Forum; 17,505	4–3

1988 schedule

== Starting Lineups ==
=== Regular Season ===
1987–88 Regular Season Starting Lineup game log
November

#	Date	Opponent	PF	SF	C	PG	SG
8	November 20	DAL	#45; Green	#42; Worthy	#33; Abdul-Jabbar	#32; Johnson	#4; Scott
11	November 27	DEN					

December

#	Date	Opponent	PF	SF	C	PG	SG
18	December 11	@ BOS					
25	December 26	@ UTA					

January

#	Date	Opponent	PF	SF	C	PG	SG
29	January 6	DAL	#45; Green	#42; Worthy	#33; Abdul-Jabbar	#32; Johnson	#4; Scott
30	January 8	@ DET	#45; Green	#42; Worthy	#33; Abdul-Jabbar	#32; Johnson	#4; Scott
36	January 21	@ DEN					
39	January 26	UTA					
41	January 29	ATL					

February

#	Date	Opponent	PF	SF	C	PG	SG
42	February 2	CHI					
45	February 11	@ DEN					
47	February 14	BOS					
50	February 19	@ ATL					
51	February 21	DET	#45; Green	#42; Worthy	#33; Abdul-Jabbar	#32; Johnson	#4; Scott
53	February 26	UTA					

March

#	Date	Opponent	PF	SF	C	PG	SG
57	March 6	@ DAL	#45; Green	#42; Worthy	#33; Abdul-Jabbar	#32; Johnson	#4; Scott
60	March 10	@ CHI					
61	March 12	DAL	#45; Green	#42; Worthy	#33; Abdul-Jabbar	#1; Matthews	#4; Scott
67	March 25	DEN					
69	March 29	UTA					

April

#	Date	Opponent	PF	SF	C	PG	SG
70	April 2	@ UTA					
76	April 13	@ DEN					
80	April 20	@ DAL	#31; Rambis	#21; Cooper	#33; Abdul-Jabbar	#32; Johnson	#4; Scott

=== Playoffs ===
1987–88 Playoffs Starting Lineup game log
Western Conference First Round: vs. San Antonio Spurs

#	Date	Opponent	PF	SF	C	PG	SG
1	April 29	SA					
2	May 1	SA					
3	May 3	@ SA					

Western Conference Semifinals: vs. Utah Jazz

#	Date	Opponent	PF	SF	C	PG	SG
1	May 8	UTA					
2	May 10	UTA					
3	May 13	@ UTA					
4	May 15	@ UTA					
5	May 17	UTA					
6	May 19	@ UTA					
7	May 21	UTA					

Western Conference Finals: vs. Dallas Mavericks

#	Date	Opponent	PF	SF	C	PG	SG
1	May 23	DAL	#45; Green	#42; Worthy	#33; Abdul-Jabbar	#32; Johnson	#4; Scott
2	May 25	DAL	#45; Green	#42; Worthy	#33; Abdul-Jabbar	#32; Johnson	#4; Scott
3	May 27	@ DAL	#45; Green	#42; Worthy	#33; Abdul-Jabbar	#32; Johnson	#4; Scott
4	May 29	@ DAL	#45; Green	#42; Worthy	#33; Abdul-Jabbar	#32; Johnson	#4; Scott
5	May 31	DAL	#45; Green	#42; Worthy	#33; Abdul-Jabbar	#32; Johnson	#4; Scott
6	June 2	@ DAL	#45; Green	#42; Worthy	#33; Abdul-Jabbar	#32; Johnson	#4; Scott
7	June 4	DAL	#45; Green	#42; Worthy	#33; Abdul-Jabbar	#32; Johnson	#4; Scott

NBA Finals: vs. Detroit Pistons

#	Date	Opponent	PF	SF	C	PG	SG
1	June 7	DET	#45; Green	#42; Worthy	#33; Abdul-Jabbar	#32; Johnson	#4; Scott
2	June 9	DET	#45; Green	#42; Worthy	#33; Abdul-Jabbar	#32; Johnson	#4; Scott
3	June 12	@ DET	#45; Green	#42; Worthy	#33; Abdul-Jabbar	#32; Johnson	#4; Scott
4	June 14	@ DET	#45; Green	#42; Worthy	#33; Abdul-Jabbar	#32; Johnson	#4; Scott
5	June 16	@ DET	#45; Green	#42; Worthy	#33; Abdul-Jabbar	#32; Johnson	#4; Scott
6	June 19	DET	#45; Green	#42; Worthy	#33; Abdul-Jabbar	#32; Johnson	#4; Scott
7	June 21	DET	#45; Green	#42; Worthy	#33; Abdul-Jabbar	#32; Johnson	#4; Scott

== Game Officials ==
=== Regular Season ===
1987–88 Regular Season Officials game log
November

#	Date	Opponent	Officials
8	November 20	DAL	No. 40 Mike Lauerman and No. 14 Jack Madden
11	November 27	DEN	No. 10 Darell Garretson and No. 41 Ken Mauer

December

#	Date	Opponent	Officials
18	December 11	@ BOS	No. 13 Mike Mathis and No. 22 Paul Mihalak
25	December 26	@ UTA	No. 23 Bernie Fryer and No. 12 Earl Strom

January

#	Date	Opponent	Officials
29	January 6	DAL	No. 34 Ronnie Nunn and No. 4 Ed T. Rush
30	January 8	@ DET	No. 40 Mike Lauerman and No. 14 Jack Madden
36	January 21	@ DEN	No. 34 Ronnie Nunn and No. 21 Bill Oakes
39	January 26	UTA	No. 44 Ron Garretson and No. 4 Ed T. Rush
41	January 29	ATL	No. 18 Ed Middleton and No. 28 Tommy Nunez

February

#	Date	Opponent	Officials
42	February 2	CHI	No. 17 Joe Crawford and No. 35 Jack Nies
45	February 11	@ DEN	No. 42 Hue Hollins and No. 37 Blaine Reichelt
47	February 14	BOS	No. 8 Lee Jones and No. 14 Jack Madden
50	February 19	@ ATL	No. 35 Jack Nies and No. 12 Earl Strom
51	February 21	DET	No. 26 Bruce Alexander and No. 20 Jess Kersey
53	February 26	UTA	No. 31 Terry Durham and No. 37 Blaine Reichelt

March

#	Date	Opponent	Officials
57	March 6	@ DAL	No. 27 Dick Bavetta and No. 11 Jake O'Donnell
60	March 10	@ CHI	No. 44 Ron Garretson and No. 4 Ed T. Rush
61	March 12	DAL	No. 43 Dan Crawford and No. 10 Darell Garretson
67	March 25	DEN	No. 20 Jess Kersey and No. 41 Ken Mauer
69	March 29	UTA	No. 42 Hue Hollins and No. 37 Blaine Reichelt

April

#	Date	Opponent	Officials
70	April 2	@ UTA	No. 23 Bernie Fryer and No. 14 Jack Madden
76	April 13	@ DEN	No. 17 Joe Crawford and No. 35 Jack Nies
80	April 20	@ DAL	No. 28 Tommy Nunez and No. 11 Jake O'Donnell

=== Playoffs ===
1987–88 Playoffs Officials game log
Western Conference First Round: vs. San Antonio Spurs

#	Date	Opponent	Officials	Alternate
1	April 29	SA		
2	May 1	SA		
3	May 3	@ SA		

Western Conference Semifinals: vs. Utah Jazz

#	Date	Opponent	Officials	Alternate
1	May 8	UTA	No. 14 Jack Madden and No. 22 Paul Mihalak	No.
2	May 10	UTA	No. 17 Joe Crawford and No. 26 Bruce Alexander	No. 24 Bill Saar
3	May 13	@ UTA	No. 4 Ed T. Rush and No. 21 Bill Oakes	No.
4	May 15	@ UTA	No. 11 Jake O'Donnell and No. 27 Dick Bavetta	
5	May 17	UTA	No. 10 Darell Garretson and No. 13 Mike Mathis	No.
6	May 19	@ UTA	No. 25 Hugh Evans and No. 42 Hue Hollins	No. 31 Terry Durham
7	May 21	UTA	No. 20 Jess Kersey and No. 12 Earl Strom	No.

Western Conference Finals: vs. Dallas Mavericks

#	Date	Opponent	Officials	Alternate
1	May 23	DAL	No. 17 Joe Crawford and No. 14 Jack Madden	No. 21 Bill Oakes
2	May 25	DAL	No. 4 Ed T. Rush and No. 21 Bill Oakes	No. 42 Hue Hollins
3	May 27	@ DAL	No. 10 Darell Garretson and No. 42 Hue Hollins	No. 27 Dick Bavetta
4	May 29	@ DAL	No. 11 Jake O'Donnell and No. 27 Dick Bavetta	No. 13 Mike Mathis
5	May 31	DAL	No. 25 Hugh Evans and No. 12 Earl Strom	No. 24 Bill Saar
6	June 2	@ DAL	No. 20 Jess Kersey and No. 4 Ed T. Rush	No. 22 Paul Mihalak
7	June 4	DAL	No. 14 Jack Madden and No. 11 Jake O'Donnell	No. 42 Hue Hollins

NBA Finals: vs. Detroit Pistons

#	Date	Opponent	Officials	Alternate
1	June 7	DET	No. 17 Joe Crawford and No. 10 Darell Garretson	No. 20 Jess Kersey
2	June 9	DET	No. 20 Jess Kersey and No. 4 Ed T. Rush	No. 25 Hugh Evans
3	June 12	@ DET	No. 25 Hugh Evans and No. 12 Earl Strom	No. 11 Jake O'Donnell
4	June 14	@ DET	No. 14 Jack Madden and No. 11 Jake O'Donnell	No. 17 Joe Crawford
5	June 16	@ DET	No. 17 Joe Crawford and No. 10 Darell Garretson	No. 4 Ed T. Rush
6	June 19	DET	No. 25 Hugh Evans and No. 4 Ed T. Rush	No. 14 Jack Madden
7	June 21	DET	No. 11 Jake O'Donnell and No. 12 Earl Strom	No. 17 Joe Crawford

== Player statistics ==
Legend
GP	Games played	GS	Games started	MPG	Minutes per game
FG%	Field-goal percentage	3P%	3-point field-goal percentage	FT%	Free-throw percentage
RPG	Rebounds per game	APG	Assists per game	SPG	Steals per game
BPG	Blocks per game	PPG	Points per game

=== Season ===
Los Angeles Lakers statistics
Player	GP	GS	MPG	FG%	3P%	FT%	RPG	APG	SPG	BPG	PPG
Kareem Abdul-Jabbar	80	80	28.9	.532	.000	.762	6.0	1.7	0.6	1.2	14.6
Tony Campbell	13	1	18.6	.564	.333	.718	2.1	1.1	0.8	0.2	11.0
Michael Cooper	61	8	29.4	.392	.320	.858	3.7	4.7	1.1	0.4	8.7
A.C. Green	82	64	32.1	.503	.000	.773	8.7	1.1	1.1	0.5	11.4
Magic Johnson	72	70	36.6	.492	.196	.853	6.2	11.9	1.6	0.2	19.6
Jeff Lamp	3	0	2.3	.000	.000	1.000	0.0	0.0	0.0	0.0	0.7
Wes Matthews	51	8	13.8	.460	.233	.831	1.3	2.7	0.5	0.1	5.7
Kurt Rambis	70	20	12.1	.548	.000	.785	3.8	0.8	0.6	0.2	4.0
Byron Scott	81	81	37.6	.527	.346	.858	4.1	4.1	1.9	0.3	21.7
Mike Smrek	48	2	8.8	.427	.000	.667	1.8	0.2	0.1	0.9	2.8
Billy Thompson	9	0	4.2	.231	.000	.800	1.0	0.1	0.1	0.0	1.6
Mychal Thompson	80	0	25.1	.512	.000	.634	6.1	0.8	0.5	1.0	11.6
Ray Tolbert	14	0	5.9	.571	.000	.769	0.7	1.5	0.2	0.2	3.0
Milt Wagner	40	4	9.5	.422	.200	.897	0.7	1.5	0.2	0.1	3.8
James Worthy	75	72	35.4	.531	.125	.796	5.0	3.9	1.0	0.7	19.7

=== Playoffs ===
Los Angeles Lakers statistics
Player	GP	GS	MPG	FG%	3P%	FT%	RPG	APG	SPG	BPG	PPG
Kareem Abdul-Jabbar	24	24	29.9	.464	.000	.789	5.5	1.5	0.6	1.5	14.1
Tony Campbell	15	0	6.3	.429	.000	.688	0.7	0.3	0.2	0.0	3.1
Michael Cooper	24	0	24.5	.412	.403	.741	2.4	2.7	0.8	0.3	6.4
A.C. Green	24	18	30.3	.544	.000	.753	7.3	0.8	0.1	0.5	10.1
Magic Johnson	24	24	40.2	.514	.500	.852	5.4	12.6	1.4	0.1	19.9
Wes Matthews	10	0	2.7	.400	.000	.800	0.1	0.2	0.1	0.0	1.2
Kurt Rambis	19	6	9.8	.618	.000	.692	2.7	0.4	0.2	0.1	2.7
Byron Scott	24	24	37.4	.499	.436	.865	4.2	2.5	1.4	0.2	19.6
Mike Smrek	8	0	4.3	.200	.000	.333	0.8	0.0	0.1	0.3	0.4
Mychal Thompson	24	0	25.6	.513	.000	.581	7.1	0.5	0.7	0.8	9.7
Milt Wagner	5	0	2.8	.400	.000	1.000	0.4	0.6	0.0	0.2	1.2
James Worthy	24	24	37.3	.523	.111	.758	5.8	4.4	1.3	0.8	21.1

Player statistics citation:

== Awards and records ==
=== Awards ===
- James Worthy, NBA Finals Most Valuable Player Award
- Magic Johnson, All-NBA First Team
- Michael Cooper, NBA All-Defensive First Team

=== All-Star ===
- Kareem Abdul-Jabbar was named to his 18th consecutive NBA All-Star Game. He broke the All-Star scoring record during the game at Chicago Stadium
- Magic Johnson was voted to his 6th consecutive NBA All-Star Game as a starter and 8th overall
- James Worthy was voted to his 3rd consecutive NBA All-Star Game
- Pat Riley was the NBA All-Star Games Western Conference coach for the 4th consecutive time and 6th overall

== Transactions ==
=== Free Agents ===
==== Additions ==== : Player / Signed / Former team	==== Subtractions ==== : Player / Left / New team
