= Gary Dolphin =

American sports broadcaster

- Presenting career
- Show: Iowa Hawkeyes football Iowa Hawkeyes men's basketball
- Network: Iowa Hawkeye Sports Network
- Country: United States
- Website: www.hawkeyesports.com/sports/m-footbl/spec-rel/090707aai.html

Gary Dolphin is an American sports broadcaster. He is the radio play-by-play broadcaster for the University of Iowa Hawkeyes football and men's basketball teams for Learfield and the Iowa Hawkeye Sports Network, having served in that role since December 1996.

== Career ==
Dolphin attended Loras College in Dubuque, Iowa and then enrolled at Brown Institute of Broadcasting in Minneapolis. Prior to getting the job from Learfield Sports as "The Voice of The Hawkeyes," Dolphin had various stops in both radio and television before landing a job calling Northwestern University men's basketball in 1990. In 1996, Dolphin was one of 63 applicants that applied for the University of Iowa job. After a successful interview, he was hired on December 13, 1996. For football broadcasts, he works alongside Pat Angerer. His broadcast partner for basketball is Bobby Hansen.

In 1999, Dolphin was a contender for the radio play-by-play job on Chicago Bears football broadcasts. The field was narrowed to Dolphin and Gary Bender and the Bears chose Bender. Just two years later, the Bears pursued Dolphin when Bender resigned citing exhaustion from the extensive travel required. Dolphin rejected the Bears' offer because it would have forced him to move to Chicago and cut his ties to the Hawkeyes' broadcasts.

In addition to calling games, Dolphin is the host of the weekly radio program Hawk Talk, where fans can call in to talk to Dolphin and Iowa coaches Kirk Ferentz and Ben McCollum. He also hosts weekly television coaches shows, where Ferentz and McCollum recap the latest games.

Dolphin was named "Iowa Sportscaster of the Year" by the National Sportscasters and Sportswriters Association in 2000 and 2010.

In September 2026, the University of Iowa announced it would be naming the radio booth at Kinnick Stadium after Dolphin. This was to honor his 30 years of dedication to the program. Additionally, later that month he was officially added to the stadium's Media Wall of Fame.
