= Milt Wagner =

American basketball player and coach (born 1963)

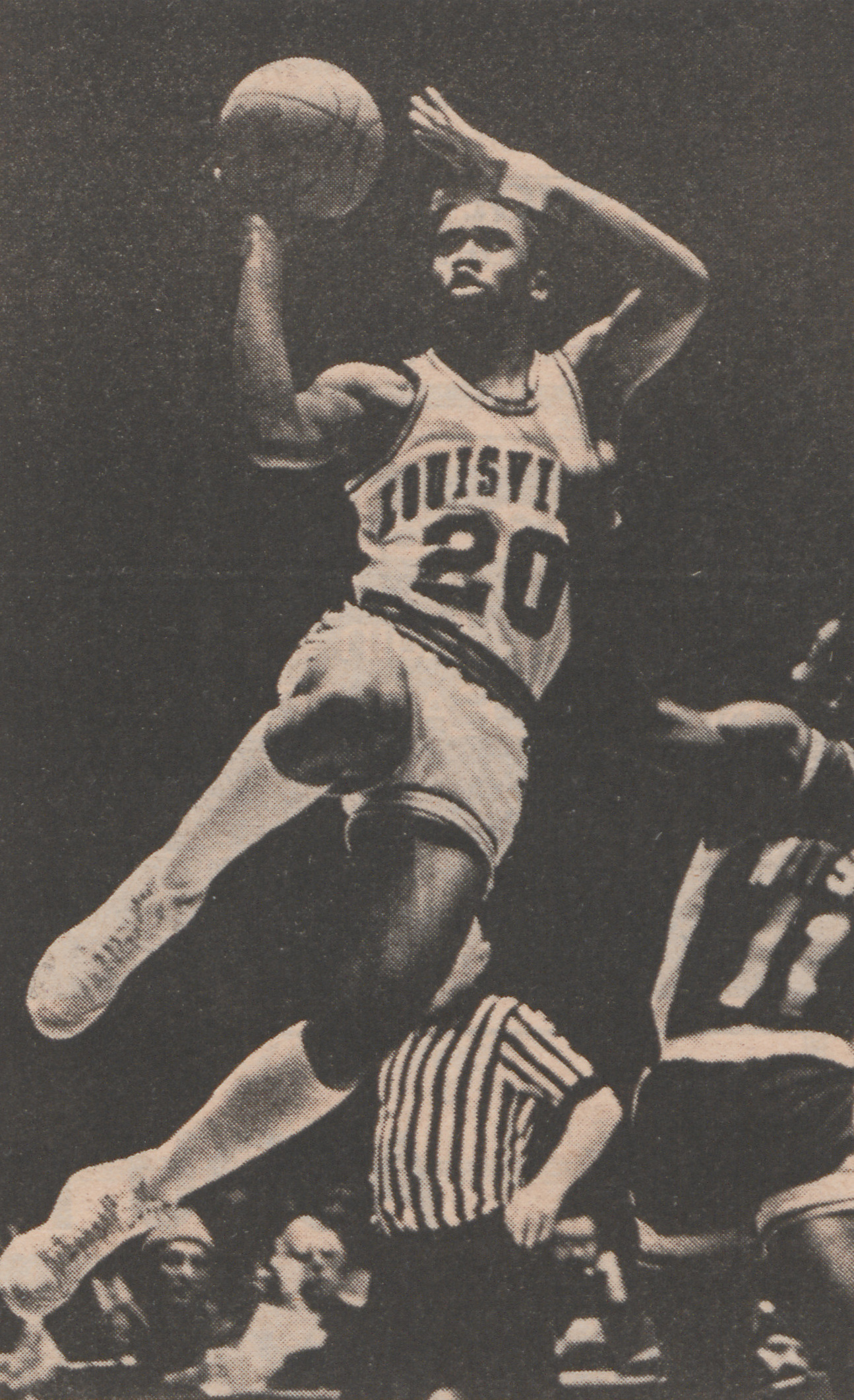
- Wagner playing for Louisville in 1983

Personal information
- Born: February 20, 1963 (age 63) Camden, New Jersey, U.S.
- Listed height: 6 ft 5 in (1.96 m)
- Listed weight: 185 lb (84 kg)

Career information
- High school: Camden (Camden, New Jersey)
- College: Louisville (1981–1986)
- NBA draft: 1986: 2nd round, 35th overall pick
- Drafted by: Dallas Mavericks
- Playing career: 1986–1999
- Position: Shooting guard / point guard
- Number: 20, 25
- Coaching career: 2006–2014

Career history

Playing
- 1986–1987: Rockford Lightning
- 1987: La Crosse Catbirds
- 1987–1988: Los Angeles Lakers
- 1988–1989: Rapid City Thrillers
- 1989–1990: Maccabi Ramat Gan
- 1990: Miami Heat
- 1990–1991: Quad City Thunder
- 1991: Louisville Shooters
- 1992–1993: Paris Basket Racing
- 1993–1994: Maccabi Ramat Gan
- 1994–1995: Hapoel Tel Aviv
- 1995–1997: Hapoel Holon
- 1997–1998: TSV Bayer 04 Leverkusen
- 1998–1999: Espé Basket Châlons-en-Champagne

Coaching
- 2006–2010: UTEP (assistant)
- 2010–2014: Auburn (assistant)

Career highlights
- NBA champion (1988); NCAA champion (1986); 2× First-team All-Metro Conference (1984, 1986); Second-team Parade All-American (1981); McDonald's All-American (1981)
- Stats at NBA.com
- Stats at Basketball Reference

Milton E. Wagner Jr. (born February 20, 1963) is an American former basketball coach and former professional basketball player. After playing college basketball at Louisville, Wagner played in the National Basketball Association (NBA). He served as assistant coach for the UTEP Miners and the Auburn Tigers. He most recently served as the Director of Player Development and Alumni Relations at the University of Louisville.

== Career ==
Wagner played high school basketball at Camden High School.

A 6' 5" point guard/shooting guard he led the Louisville Cardinals to the 1986 NCAA Championship along with three Final Four berths (1982, 1983, 1986) as well as to the 1984 Sweet Sixteen. He helped the Cardinals to a 113–32 record, three Metro Conference regular season titles and two Metro Conference Tournament crowns during his college career. He redshirted the 1985 season with a broken foot.

A three-time All-Metro Conference selection, Wagner ranks fifth (was fourth after finishing collegiate career) in Cardinal history with 1,836 career points, with a 12.7 career scoring average while also averaging three assists and 2.5 rebounds. He played in 144 career games, second all-time at Louisville, and started the last 111 games he played. He ranks sixth in career assists (432) and seventh in career free throw percentage (.808, 336-of-413).

Wagner was drafted in the second round of the 1986 NBA draft. Wagner is one of the few players that have won national titles in high school, college and in the NBA. He and Billy Thompson are the only players to win all three championships as teammates.

Wagner is also the father of Munirah Walker, DaShonda Wagner, Janay Wagner and former NBA player Dajuan Wagner, and grandfather of five-star recruit D. J. Wagner who plays for the University of Arkansas. He served as an assistant men's basketball coach for the University of Texas at El Paso under Tony Barbee. In 2010, he moved to Auburn as part of Barbee's staff there.

== Career statistics ==
Legend
GP	Games played	GS	Games started	MPG	Minutes per game
FG%	Field goal percentage	3P%	3-point field goal percentage	FT%	Free throw percentage
RPG	Rebounds per game	APG	Assists per game	SPG	Steals per game
BPG	Blocks per game	PPG	Points per game	**Bold**	Career high
†	Won an NBA championship

=== NBA ===
==== Regular season ====
Year	Team	GP	GS	MPG	FG%	3P%	FT%	RPG	APG	SPG	BPG	PPG
1987–88†	L.A. Lakers	**40**	**4**	**9.5**	**.422**	.200	**.897**	**.7**	**1.5**	**.2**	.1	3.8
1990–91	Miami	13	1	8.9	.421	**.353**	.818	.5	1.2	**.2**	**.2**	**4.8**
Career		53	5	9.4	.422	.296	.875	.7	1.4	.2	.1	4.1

==== Playoffs ====
Year	Team	GP	GS	MPG	FG%	3P%	FT%	RPG	APG	SPG	BPG	PPG
1988†	L.A. Lakers	5	0	2.8	.400	.000	1.000	.4	.6	.0	.2	1.2
