= Bart Kofoed =

American basketball player (born 1964)

Personal information
- Born: March 24, 1964 (age 62) Omaha, Nebraska, U.S.
- Listed height: 6 ft 4 in (1.93 m)
- Listed weight: 210 lb (95 kg)

Career information
- High school: Westside (Omaha, Nebraska)
- College: Hastings College (1982–1984); Nebraska–Kearney (1985–1987)
- NBA draft: 1987: 5th round, 107th overall pick
- Drafted by: Utah Jazz
- Playing career: 1987–1995
- Position: Point guard
- Number: 11, 23, 12

Career history

Playing
- 1987–1989: Utah Jazz
- 1989: Rochester Flyers
- 1990: Golden State Warriors
- 1990–1991: La Crosse Catbirds
- 1991: Yakima Sun Kings
- 1991–1992: Seattle SuperSonics
- 1992–1993: Boston Celtics
- 1993–1995: Omaha Racers

Coaching
- 1994–1995: Omaha Racers (assistant)

Career highlights
- CBA champion (1993)
- Stats at NBA.com
- Stats at Basketball Reference

Bart Kofoed (born March 24, 1964) is an American former professional basketball player. At 6 ft 4 in (1.93 m) he played as a point guard.

Kofoed attended Hastings College before transferring to Kearney State College (now University of Nebraska at Kearney), and was selected with the 15th pick of the fifth round of the 1987 NBA draft by the Utah Jazz (107th overall). He played on four different NBA teams between 1987 and 1992. During the 1994–95 Continental Basketball Association season, Kofoed served as assistant coach to Omaha Racers head coach Mike Thibault, as he had previously helped them win the 1993 title.

Along with former NBA players Bobby Jones and David Thompson, Kofoed co-founded 2XSALT, a non-profit Christian organization based in Charlotte, North Carolina.

== College career ==
In his junior season, Kofoed transferred to the Nebraska–Kearney Lopers, and averaged 21.2 points and had 186 assists. As a senior, he set school records with 902 points, a 26.5 average and 198 assists and led the Lopers to a 26–8 mark and a record-setting 10th straight appearance in the NAIA National Tournament. For his play that season, he was named a second team All-American and was conference and district player of the year.

== Professional career ==
=== Utah Jazz ===
Kofoed was drafted 107th overall in the fifth round of the 1987 NBA draft. In his rookie season, he lived with Karl Malone. He didn't play at first as he had a broken foot, but soon joined the roster. He played in 36 of the Jazz's remaining 54 games. In a Game 1 loss during their playoff series against the Portland Trail Blazers, he filled in for Kelly Tripucka, scoring seven points and holding All-Star Clyde Drexler to below his season average in points. The Jazz moved on to the semis, where they held a 2–1 lead. In Game 4, his inexperience showed, as he got into foul trouble, had several turnovers, and missed shots. Although the Jazz extended the series, they lost Game 7, and the Lakers went on to win the championship.

The Jazz re-signed Kofoed to a two-year contract. During a New Year's Eve party to ring in 1989, Kofoed and teammate Bobby Hansen got into a fight, with Kofoed breaking Hansen's cheekbone. Hansen couldn't play for a month. Two days after the incident, the Jazz waived him.

=== First CBA stint ===
After the incident with Hansen, Kofoed played for the Rochester Flyers in the Continental Basketball Association (CBA).

=== Golden State Warriors ===
Kofoed then signed with the Golden State Warriors. A sprained ankle caused the team to waive him, but when Mitch Richmond broke his thumb, the Warriors signed him once again.

=== Second CBA stint ===
Kofoed returned to the CBA first for the La Crosse Catbirds, then the Yakima SunKings.

=== Seattle Supersonics ===
Kofoed then signed with the Seattle Supersonics. In a loss to the Charlotte Hornets, he scored a career-high 15 points along with nine assists and five rebounds. He would go on to play a career-high 44 games for them. He was waived near the end of the season, but stayed with the team to help prepare them for the playoffs.

=== Boston Celtics ===
On October 8, 1992, Kofoed signed with the Boston Celtics. He was waived a month later, but brought back to the team a few days after he was cut. He had six assists in a win over the Detroit Pistons. In January 1993, he was waived before his contract became guaranteed. In all, he only played seven games for the team, averaging 2.4 points and 1.4 assists per game as a reserve.

=== Third CBA stint ===
He helped the Racers win the 1993 title. The following season, they were the champions of their conference. He signed with them for one more season. He tried to sign with the Minnesota Timberwolves, but couldn't make the team.

== Coaching career ==
During the 1994–95 Continental Basketball Association season, Kofoed served as assistant coach to Omaha Racers head coach Mike Thibault.

== Career statistics ==
Legend
GP	Games played	GS	Games started	MPG	Minutes per game
FG%	Field goal percentage	3P%	3-point field goal percentage	FT%	Free throw percentage
RPG	Rebounds per game	APG	Assists per game	SPG	Steals per game
BPG	Blocks per game	PPG	Points per game	**Bold**	Career high

=== NBA ===
==== Regular season ====
Year	Team	GP	GS	MPG	FG%	3P%	FT%	RPG	APG	SPG	BPG	PPG
1987–88	Utah	36	0	6.3	.375	**.286**	.615	.4	.6	.2	.0	1.3
1988–89	Utah	19	0	**9.3**	.364	.000	.545	**.6**	1.1	**.5**	.0	1.6
1990–91	Golden State	5	0	4.2	.000	—	.500	**.6**	.8	—	—	.6
1991–92	Seattle	**44**	0	5.4	**.472**	.143	.577	**.6**	1.2	.0	.0	1.5
1992–93	Boston	7	0	5.9	.231	.000	**.786**	.1	**1.4**	.3	**.1**	**2.4**
Career		111	0	6.3	.387	.188	.614	.5	1.0	.0	.0	1.5

==== Playoffs ====
Year	Team	GP	GS	MPG	FG%	3P%	FT%	RPG	APG	SPG	BPG	PPG
1988	Utah	10	0	10.9	.391	.200	1.000	1.4	1.1	.1	.0	2.1
Career		10	0	10.9	.391	.200	1.000	1.4	1.1	.1	.0	2.1

== Post-retirement ==
After retirement, Kofoed put up his own restaurants, one of which he had to close down. He then worked at Cisco Food Services. He then established 2XSALT, a non-profit Christian organization based in Charlotte, North Carolina that supports underprivileged youth through sports. NBA legends David Thompson and Bobby Jones then came aboard to help run the program. He and his wife also own a non-profit restaurant, The Grinning Mule.

== Personal life ==
Kofoed is married and he has four children.
