= Tony Campbell =

American basketball player and coach (born 1962)

Personal information
- Born: May 7, 1962 (age 64) Teaneck, New Jersey, U.S.
- Listed height: 6 ft 7 in (2.01 m)
- Listed weight: 215 lb (98 kg)

Career information
- High school: Teaneck (Teaneck, New Jersey)
- College: Ohio State (1980–1984)
- NBA draft: 1984: 1st round, 20th overall pick
- Drafted by: Detroit Pistons
- Playing career: 1984–1997
- Position: Small forward / shooting guard
- Number: 00, 19, 9

Career history
- 1984–1987: Detroit Pistons
- 1987: New Jersey Jammers
- 1987–1988: Albany Patroons
- 1988–1989: Los Angeles Lakers
- 1989–1992: Minnesota Timberwolves
- 1992–1994: New York Knicks
- 1994: Dallas Mavericks
- 1994–1995: Cleveland Cavaliers
- 1995: AEK Athens
- 1996–1997: Florida Beach Dogs

Career highlights
- NBA champion (1988); CBA champion (1988); CBA Newcomer of the Year (1989); 2× First-team All-Big Ten (1983, 1984)

Career NBA statistics
- Points: 7,994 (11.6 ppg)
- Rebounds: 2,117 (3.1 rpg)
- Assists: 1,019 (1.5 apg)
- Stats at NBA.com
- Stats at Basketball Reference

Anthony Campbell (born May 7, 1962) is an American former professional National Basketball Association (NBA) player.

Campbell played prep basketball at Teaneck High School in Teaneck, New Jersey, graduating in 1980. A 6'7" small forward out of Ohio State University, Campbell was selected 20th overall by the Detroit Pistons in the 1984 NBA draft. He was traded to the Los Angeles Lakers in 1987.

Campbell became the first player to earn an NBA ring (1987–88 Lakers) and CBA ring (Albany Patroons) in the same season.

Campbell struggled for playing time during his stint in Los Angeles. In 1989 he was signed as an unrestricted free agent by the Minnesota Timberwolves, for whom he averaged 23.2 points and 5.5 rebounds per game in their inaugural season. He held the Timberwolves' original all-time scoring record, scoring 4,888 points, before having his record later broken by Doug West.

After his time with the Timberwolves, Campbell played for the New York Knicks, Dallas Mavericks and Cleveland Cavaliers before leaving the NBA in 1995.

From 2007 to February 16, 2018, he was the director of athletics and head basketball coach at Bay Ridge Preparatory School in Brooklyn, New York.

== Career statistics ==
Legend
GP	Games played	GS	Games started	MPG	Minutes per game
FG%	Field goal percentage	3P%	3-point field goal percentage	FT%	Free throw percentage
RPG	Rebounds per game	APG	Assists per game	SPG	Steals per game
BPG	Blocks per game	PPG	Points per game	**Bold**	Career high
†	Won an NBA championship	*	Led the league

=== NBA ===
==== Regular season ====
Year	Team	GP	GS	MPG	FG%	3P%	FT%	RPG	APG	SPG	BPG	PPG
1984–85	Detroit	56	0	11.2	.496	.000	.800	1.6	.4	.5	.1	5.6
1985–86	Detroit	**82**	1	15.8	.484	.222	.795	2.9	.5	.8	.1	7.9
1986–87	Detroit	40	0	8.3	.393	.000	.615	1.5	.5	.3	.0	3.5
1987–88†	L.A. Lakers	13	1	18.6	**.564**	.333	.718	2.1	1.2	.8	.2	11.0
1988–89	L.A. Lakers	63	2	12.5	.458	.095	**.843**	2.1	.7	.6	.2	6.2
1989–90	Minnesota	**82***	**81**	**38.6**	.457	.167	.787	**5.5**	2.6	1.4	.4	**23.2**
1990–91	Minnesota	77	71	37.6	.434	.262	.803	4.5	2.6	**1.6**	**.6**	21.8
1991–92	Minnesota	78	41	31.3	.464	.351	.803	3.7	**2.9**	1.1	.4	16.8
1992–93	New York	58	13	18.3	.490	**.400**	.678	2.7	1.1	.6	.1	7.7
1993–94	New York	22	11	17.2	.492	.333	.811	2.7	1.4	.9	.0	7.1
1993–94	Dallas	41	3	20.4	.427	.240	.771	3.1	1.2	.7	.3	9.7
1994–95	Cleveland	78	0	14.5	.411	.357	.830	2.0	.9	.4	.1	6.0
Career		690	224	22.0	.456	.254	.790	3.1	1.5	.8	.2	11.6

==== Playoffs ====
Year	Team	GP	GS	MPG	FG%	3P%	FT%	RPG	APG	SPG	BPG	PPG
1985	Detroit	2	0	4.5	.333	–	–	1.0	.5	.0	.0	1.0
1986	Detroit	2	0	8.0	.400	–	.500	1.0	.0	.0	.0	4.5
1987	Detroit	4	0	3.3	.500	**1.000**	**1.000**	1.3	.0	.0	.0	2.3
1988†	L.A. Lakers	**15**	0	6.3	.429	.000	.688	.7	.3	.2	.0	3.1
1989	L.A. Lakers	9	**1**	11.8	**.613**	.500	.727	1.3	.7	.3	.0	6.2
1993	New York	2	0	**16.5**	.400	.000	.750	**2.0**	**1.0**	**.5**	.0	**7.0**
1995	Cleveland	4	0	9.3	.429	.500	.833	.5	.3	.3	**.3**	5.8
Career		38	1	8.1	.474	.444	.742	1.0	.4	.2	.0	4.2
