= Bob Hansen =

American basketball player (born 1961)

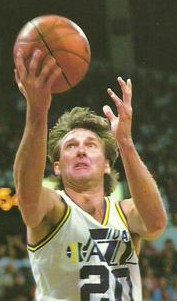
- Hansen, circa 1988

Personal information
- Born: January 18, 1961 (age 65) Des Moines, Iowa, U.S.
- Listed height: 6 ft 6 in (1.98 m)
- Listed weight: 190 lb (86 kg)

Career information
- High school: Dowling (West Des Moines, Iowa)
- College: Iowa (1979–1983)
- NBA draft: 1983: 3rd round, 54th overall pick
- Drafted by: Utah Jazz
- Playing career: 1983–1992
- Position: Shooting guard
- Number: 20

Career history
- 1983–1990: Utah Jazz
- 1990–1991: Sacramento Kings
- 1991–1992: Chicago Bulls

Career highlights
- NBA champion (1992)

Career statistics
- Points: 3,952
- Rebounds: 1,282
- Assists: 947
- Stats at NBA.com
- Stats at Basketball Reference
Medals
Men's basketball
Representing United States
FIBA U19 World Championship
Gold medal – first place	1979 Salvador	National team

Robert Louis Hansen II (born January 18, 1961) is an American former professional basketball player. A 6 ft 6 in (1.98 m) guard, he played nine seasons (1983–1992) in the National Basketball Association (NBA). Hansen is currently a commentator for Iowa Hawkeyes basketball broadcasts.

== Early years ==
Hansen attended Christ The King Elementary school and was a four-year starter at West Des Moines Dowling High School in the late 1970s. As a senior, he averaged 26 points and eleven rebounds per game to lead his team to an Iowa Class 4-A boys' basketball championship in 1979.

== College career ==
His success in high school made him a prized recruit for head coach Lute Olson and the Iowa Hawkeyes, where Hansen played a key role on the team that reached the 1980 Final Four.

Hanson averaged 5.6 ppg as a freshman in 1979–1980 as Iowa reached the Final Four. He averaged 8.4 in 1980–1981 as Iowa finished 21–7. He led the 21–8 Hawkeyes with 12.0 ppg in 1981–1982. As a senior in 1982–1983, he helped lead Iowa to the NCAA Sweet 16, averaging 15.4 points and 5.7 rebounds.

As a senior in 1983, he was named as the Hawkeyes' Most Valuable Player.

== Professional career ==
Hansen was selected by the Utah Jazz in the third round of the 1983 NBA draft, the 54th overall pick. Hansen appeared in 55 games during his rookie season with the Jazz, averaging 2.7 points per game and 7.6 minutes per game. By the 1985–86 season, Hansen was a regular starter for the Jazz. He was also one of three Jazz players named NBA Player of the Week (March 6, 1986) during the season, joining teammates John Stockton and Karl Malone. Hansen's highest scoring average, 9.7 points per game, came during the 1986–87 season. During the 1990 All-Star weekend, Hansen participated in the three-point challenge, finishing fourth.

During a New Year's Eve party to ring in 1989, Hansen and teammate Bart Kofoed got into a fight, with Kofoed breaking Hansen's cheekbone. Hansen couldn't play for a month. Two days after the incident, the Jazz waived Kofoed.

Hansen never missed the playoffs in his tenure with the Jazz, while reaching the Western Conference semifinals in both 1984 and 1988. On June 25, 1990, Hansen was involved in a three-team deal in which the Jazz acquired Jeff Malone from the Washington Bullets, the Bullets acquired Pervis Ellison from the Sacramento Kings, and the Kings acquired Hansen, Eric Leckner, and two draft picks from the Jazz.

To begin the 1990–91 season, Hansen suited up for the Kings, where he would play for chiefly one season, appearing in just two games for the 1991–92 Kings before Hansen and the Kings' 1992 second-round pick were traded for Dennis Hopson of the Chicago Bulls. In his final NBA season, and perhaps his best known, Hansen appeared in 66 regular season games and, along with Craig Hodges, served as back-up guard to Michael Jordan. Hansen, who averaged 2.5 points per contest heading into the 1992 NBA Playoffs, would have arguably his most memorable professional contribution during the 1992 NBA Finals. During Game 6, the Bulls, who held a 3–2 series lead over the Portland Trail Blazers, were trailing by 15 points after three quarters. Head coach Phil Jackson decided to pull Jordan from the game in favor of Hansen, hoping for an extra jolt to start what looked to be the final corner of a Finals looking to require seven games to determine a champion. According to longtime Bulls writer Sam Smith, Jackson may have wanted to rest his starters considering no team had ever come back from a 15-point deficit to win an NBA championship, and Hansen started the fourth quarter with a three-pointer, his only field goal of the game, and a steal off Jerome Kersey. Hansen confirmed with the defending Finals MVP Jordan whether he wanted to re-enter the game, but Jordan declined. Scottie Pippen led a 14–2 Bulls rally, and, along with Hansen and fellow reserve big man Stacey King, helped the Bulls get within three points by the time Jordan was put back in the game to replace Hansen. The Bulls completed the comeback, eventually rallying for a 97–93 victory and winning their second consecutive NBA championship. Hansen was the only player on the roster who had not won a ring with the Bulls during the 1991 Finals and after the Game 6 win, Jordan repeatedly stated, "I'm glad for Bobby Hansen." When Hansen gave Jordan the game ball, Jordan replied, "I told you I'd get you that ring." Hansen had logged 5 minutes of game time, while Jordan played in 43 minutes.

== After retirement ==
Having won his championship ring, Hansen retired from the NBA in 1992. Hansen is a color-commentator for Iowa Hawkeyes' basketball broadcasts. He calls games with Gary Dolphin. He has also run many summer basketball camps for Chicago-area children.

Former joins Iowa teammates Kevin Boyle and Steve Carfino as basketball analysts. Mark Gannon is also a former analyst.

Hanson sang "Take Me Out to the Ballgame" at Wrigley Field for the 7th Inning Stretch of the Chicago Cubs' game on August 31, 2012.

== Career statistics ==
Legend
GP	Games played	GS	Games started	MPG	Minutes per game
FG%	Field goal percentage	3P%	3-point field goal percentage	FT%	Free throw percentage
RPG	Rebounds per game	APG	Assists per game	SPG	Steals per game
BPG	Blocks per game	PPG	Points per game	**Bold**	Career high
†	Won an NBA championship	*	Led the league

=== NBA ===
==== Regular season ====
Year	Team	GP	GS	MPG	FG%	3P%	FT%	RPG	APG	SPG	BPG	PPG
1983–84	Utah	55	0	7.6	.448	.000	.643	.9	.8	.3	.1	2.7
1984–85	Utah	54	4	13.0	.489	.143	.556	1.3	1.4	.5	.0	4.8
1985–86	Utah	**82**	**82***	24.8	.476	.340	.720	**3.0**	2.4	**.9**	.1	8.7
1986–87	Utah	72	72	20.3	.453	**.356**	**.760**	2.8	1.4	.6	.1	**9.7**
1987–88	Utah	81	51	22.2	**.517**	.330	.743	2.3	2.2	.8	**.2**	9.6
1988–89	Utah	46	9	21.0	.467	.352	.560	2.8	1.1	.8	.1	7.4
1989–90	Utah	81	81	**26.8**	.467	.351	.516	2.8	1.8	.6	.1	7.6
1990–91	Sacramento	36	24	22.5	.375	.275	.500	2.7	**2.5**	.6	.1	6.4
1991–92	Sacramento	2	2	20.0	.444	.000	—	2.0	.5	.5	.0	4.0
1991–92†	Chicago	66	0	11.7	.444	.280	.364	1.1	1.0	.4	.0	2.5
Career		575	325	19.3	.468	.323	.662	2.2	1.6	.6	.1	6.9

==== Playoffs ====
Year	Team	GP	GS	MPG	FG%	3P%	FT%	RPG	APG	SPG	BPG	PPG
1984	Utah	4		4.5	.286	**.667**	.500	1.8	.5	.0	.0	1.8
1985	Utah	8	0	4.3	.250	–	.625	.5	.8	.4	.0	1.1
1986	Utah	4	4	35.0	**.730**	**.667**	**.889**	4.5	2.8	**.8**	.3	**16.0**
1987	Utah	5	5	28.4	.429	.400	.850	3.0	2.2	.2	.2	12.2
1988	Utah	**11**	**11**	37.1	.496	.528	.727	3.5	**2.9**	.6	.0	15.4
1989	Utah	3	3	**41.0**	.314	.333	.800	**5.7**	1.3	.3	**.7**	11.0
1990	Utah	5	5	29.0	.488	.500	.250	2.8	1.0	.6	.0	10.0
1992†	Chicago	9	0	7.7	.409	.500	.333	1.0	1.1	.1	.0	2.4
Career		49	28	22.0	.476	.500	.731	2.5	1.7	.4	.1	8.5

== Honors ==
He was named to the Des Moines Register Iowa Sports Hall of Fame in 1999.
