= Marc Iavaroni =

American basketball player and coach

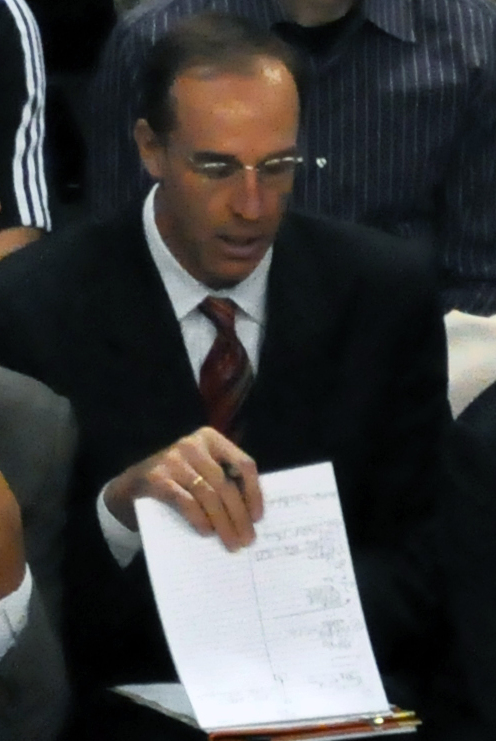
- Iavaroni in 2009

Personal information
- Born: September 15, 1956 (age 70) Jamaica, New York, U.S.
- Listed height: 6 ft 8 in (2.03 m)
- Listed weight: 210 lb (95 kg)

Career information
- High school: John F. Kennedy (Plainview, New York)
- College: Virginia (1974–1978)
- NBA draft: 1978: 3rd round, 55th overall pick
- Drafted by: New York Knicks
- Playing career: 1978–1992
- Position: Power forward
- Number: 8, 32, 43
- Coaching career: 1992–2013

Career history

Playing
- 1978–1980: Basket Brescia
- 1981–1982: Fulgor Libertas Forlì
- 1982–1984: Philadelphia 76ers
- 1984–1986: San Antonio Spurs
- 1986–1989: Utah Jazz
- 1989: Olimpia Milano
- 1990–1991: Caja de Ronda Málaga
- 1991–1992: Sioux Falls Skyforce

Career highlights
- NBA champion (1983)

Career NBA statistics
- Points: 2,328 (4.4 ppg)
- Rebounds: 1,725 (3.2 rpg)
- Assists: 514 (1.0 apg)
- Stats at NBA.com
- Stats at Basketball Reference

Marcus John Iavaroni (born September 15, 1956) is an American former professional basketball player and former head coach of the Memphis Grizzlies of the National Basketball Association (NBA). He has also served as an assistant coach for several NBA teams.

Iavaroni was a star player at Plainview, New York's John F. Kennedy High School in the 1970s and a teammate of Seth Greenberg.

Iavaroni, who joined the NBA at age 26 after playing four seasons in Europe, was an important role player as a rookie on the 1983 Philadelphia 76ers championship team, where he started 77 games in the regular season. In the 1983 NBA Finals, Iavaroni averaged 5.8 points and 5.5 rebounds in a four-game sweep. He later played for the San Antonio Spurs, where he averaged career-highs of 6.7 points and 4.8 rebounds in 1985, and the Utah Jazz.

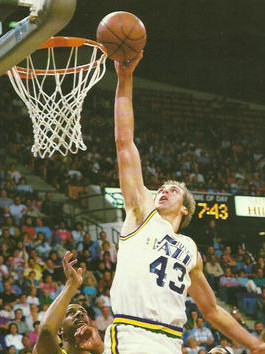
Iavaroni circa 1988

Iavaroni also played professionally in Brescia, Forlì and Málaga before retiring in 1992, playing a total of six seasons in Italy and Spain: four after his college career and two following his NBA career.

His coaching career began as a graduate assistant coach at his alma mater, the University of Virginia. Following his playing career, he was also an assistant coach for two seasons at Bowling Green State University from 1992 to 1994.

The first NBA coaching experience for Iavaroni came in 1997, when he was hired as a Cleveland Cavaliers assistant, working mainly with forwards. In 1999, he moved to the front office of the Miami Heat as director of player development. Since 2002, he served as an assistant to Mike D'Antoni at the Phoenix Suns.

On May 30, 2007, Iavaroni was named the head coach of the Memphis Grizzlies. On January 22, 2009, he was fired by the Grizzlies after an 11–30 start to the 2008–09 season.

On June 5, 2009, the Toronto Raptors announced that Iavaroni would become an assistant coach to Jay Triano.

On July 17, 2010, the Los Angeles Clippers announced that Iavaroni would become an assistant coach to newly hired Vinny Del Negro. He remained in that role until 2013.

== Career playing statistics ==
Legend
GP	Games played	GS	Games started	MPG	Minutes per game
FG%	Field goal percentage	3P%	3-point field goal percentage	FT%	Free throw percentage
RPG	Rebounds per game	APG	Assists per game	SPG	Steals per game
BPG	Blocks per game	PPG	Points per game	**Bold**	Career high
†	Won an NBA championship

=== NBA ===
==== Regular season ====
Year	Team	GP	GS	MPG	FG%	3P%	FT%	RPG	APG	SPG	BPG	PPG
1982–83†	Philadelphia	80	**77**	20.2	.462	.000	.690	4.1	1.0	.4	.6	5.1
1983–84	Philadelphia	78	71	19.6	.463	.000	.740	4.0	1.2	**.5**	**.7**	5.1
1984–85	Philadelphia	12	10	13.0	.387	–	**1.000**	2.4	.5	.3	.3	2.5
1984–85	San Antonio	57	33	**20.7**	.464	.000	.664	**4.8**	**2.0**	**.5**	.6	**6.7**
1985–86	San Antonio	42	7	15.9	.454	.000	.642	3.1	1.3	**.5**	.3	4.5
1985–86	Utah	26	2	13.3	.444	–	.688	3.0	1.1	.4	.1	4.0
1986–87	Utah	78	0	10.8	**.465**	.000	.672	2.2	.5	.2	.1	3.6
1987–88	Utah	**81**	71	15.3	.464	.000	.788	3.3	.8	.3	.3	4.5
1988–89	Utah	77	50	10.3	.442	.000	.818	1.7	.4	.1	.2	2.3
Career		531	321	15.8	.459	.000	.710	3.2	1.0	.3	.4	4.4

==== Playoffs ====
Year	Team	GP	GS	MPG	FG%	3P%	FT%	RPG	APG	SPG	BPG	PPG
1983†	Philadelphia	**13**		21.8	**.558**	–	.500	4.4	1.5	.6	.5	5.2
1984	Philadelphia	4		16.0	.467	**.500**	**.875**	2.0	.8	.3	.3	5.5
1985	San Antonio	5	5	**23.2**	.536	.000	.750	**5.2**	**2.6**	**1.0**	.4	**9.0**
1986	Utah	4	0	18.3	.313	–	.750	2.3	1.5	.3	.0	3.3
1987	Utah	5	0	9.4	.400	–	.667	2.6	.8	.0	**.6**	2.0
1988	Utah	11	**11**	12.5	.552	–	.857	1.7	1.3	.2	.2	4.0
1990	Utah	1	0	1.0	.000	.000	–	.0	.0	.0	.0	.0
Career		43	16	16.8	.503	.250	.716	3.1	1.4	.4	.3	4.7

== Head coaching record ==
Legend
Regular season	G	Games coached	W	Games won	L	Games lost	W–L %	Win–loss %
Playoffs	PG	Playoff games	PW	Playoff wins	PL	Playoff losses	PW–L %	Playoff win–loss %

Team	Year	G	W	L	W–L%	Finish	PG	PW	PL	PW–L%	Result
Memphis	2007–08	82	22	60	.268	5th in Southwest	—	—	—	—	Missed Playoffs
Memphis	2008–09	41	11	30	.268	(fired)	—	—	—	—	—
Career		123	33	90	.268		—	—	—	—	
