= 1987–88 Utah Jazz season =

NBA professional basketball team season

- Head coach: Frank Layden
- General manager: Dave Checketts
- Owner: Larry H. Miller
- Arena: Salt Palace

Results
- Record: 47–35 (.573)
- Place: Division: 3rd (Midwest); Conference: 5th (Western)
- Playoff finish: Conference semifinals (lost to Lakers 3–4)
- Stats at Basketball Reference

Local media
- Television: KSTU; Jazz Cable Network
- Radio: KSL

The 1987–88 Utah Jazz season was the 14th season for the Utah Jazz in the National Basketball Association, and their ninth season in Salt Lake City, Utah.

== Season summary ==
=== Off-season ===
The Jazz had the 15th overall pick in the 1987 NBA draft, and selected center Jose Ortiz out of Oregon State University; however, Ortiz went to play overseas in Spain, and would not play for the Jazz until the next season. During the off-season, the team acquired Melvin Turpin from the Cleveland Cavaliers.

=== Regular season ===
The Jazz played around .500 in winning percentage in the first half of the regular season, holding a 22–22 record at the All-Star break, but then played above .500 for the remainder of the season, winning seven of their final eight games. The Jazz finished in third place in the Midwest Division with a 47–35 record, and earned the fifth seed in the Western Conference; the team qualified for the NBA playoffs for the fifth consecutive year.

Karl Malone averaged 27.7 points, 12.0 rebounds and 1.4 steals per game, and was named to the All-NBA Second Team, and to the NBA All-Defensive Second Team. In addition, sixth man Thurl Bailey averaged 19.6 points, 6.5 rebounds and 1.5 blocks per game off the bench, while John Stockton showed improvement, replacing Rickey Green as the team's starting point guard this season, averaging 14.7 points, 13.8 assists and 3.0 steals per game, and also being named to the All-NBA Second Team, and Darrell Griffith contributed 11.3 points per game also off the bench, but only played 52 games due to a season-ending left knee injury. Meanwhile, Bob Hansen provided the team with 9.6 points per game, Kelly Tripucka contributed 7.5 points per game, but only played just 49 games due to a right calf injury and the flu, and Mark Eaton averaged 7.0 points, 8.7 rebounds and 3.7 blocks per game, and was also named to the NBA All-Defensive Second Team. Off the bench, Turpin provided with 5.9 points and 3.0 rebounds per game, while Green contributed 4.9 points and 3.7 assists per game, and starting small forward Marc Iavaroni averaged 4.5 points and 3.3 rebounds per game.

During the NBA All-Star weekend at the Chicago Stadium in Chicago, Illinois, Malone was selected for the 1988 NBA All-Star Game, as a member of the Western Conference All-Star team; it was his first ever All-Star appearance. Malone scored 22 points along with 10 rebounds and 2 steals, despite the Western Conference losing to the Eastern Conference, 138–133. Malone also finished in eighth place in Most Valuable Player voting, while Stockton finished in tenth place; Stockton also finished in second place in Most Improved Player voting, behind Kevin Duckworth of the Portland Trail Blazers, while Bailey finished in second place in Sixth Man of the Year voting, behind Roy Tarpley of the Dallas Mavericks, and Eaton finished in second place in Defensive Player of the Year voting, behind Michael Jordan of the Chicago Bulls, and with Stockton and Hansen both finishing tied in eighth place.

The Jazz finished 13th in the NBA in home-game attendance, with an attendance of 503,969 at the Salt Palace during the regular season.

=== NBA playoffs ===
In the Western Conference First Round of the 1988 NBA playoffs, the Jazz faced off against the 4th–seeded Trail Blazers, who were led by All-Star guard Clyde Drexler, Jerome Kersey, and Most Improved Player of the Year, Duckworth. The Jazz lost Game 1 to the Trail Blazers on the road, 108–96 at the Memorial Coliseum. However, the team managed to win the next three games, which included a Game 4 win over the Trail Blazers at home, 111–96 at the Salt Palace to win the series in four games.

In the Western Conference Semi-finals, the team faced off against the top–seeded, and defending NBA champion Los Angeles Lakers, who won the Pacific Division title, and were led by the quartet of All-Star guard Magic Johnson, All-Star forward James Worthy, Byron Scott and All-Star center Kareem Abdul-Jabbar. The Jazz lost Game 1 to the Lakers on the road, 110–91 at the Great Western Forum, but managed to win the next two games, including a Game 3 home win over the Lakers at the Salt Palace, 96–89 to take a 2–1 series lead. The Jazz lost the next two games, but managed to win Game 6 over the Lakers at the Salt Palace, 108–80 to even the series. However, the Jazz lost Game 7 to the Lakers at the Great Western Forum, 109–98, thus losing in a hard-fought seven-game series.

The Lakers would defeat the Detroit Pistons in a full seven-game series in the 1988 NBA Finals, winning their second consecutive NBA championship.

=== Aftermath ===
Following the season, Green was left unprotected in the 1988 NBA expansion draft, where he was selected by the Charlotte Hornets expansion team, while Tripucka was traded to the Hornets after two mediocre seasons with the Jazz, and Turpin left to play overseas in Spain.

== Draft picks ==
Round	Pick	Player	Position	Nationality	College
1	15	Jose Ortiz	C	Puerto Rico	Oregon State
3	61	Clarence Martin		United States	Western Kentucky
3	68	Billy Donovan	G	United States	Providence
4	84	Reuben Holmes		United States	Alabama State
5	107	Bart Kofoed	PG	United States	Nebraska-Kearney
6	130	Art Sabb		United States	Bloomfield
7	153	Keith Webster		United States	Harvard

== Roster ==
1987–88 Utah Jazz roster
Players

Pos.	No.	Player	Height	Weight	DOB	From
F	41	Thurl Bailey	6 ft 11 in (2.11 m)	215 lb (98 kg)	1961–04–07	NC State
C	53	Mark Eaton	7 ft 4 in (2.24 m)	275 lb (125 kg)	1957–01–24	UCLA
G	14	Rickey Green	6 ft 0 in (1.83 m)	170 lb (77 kg)	1954–08–18	Michigan
G	35	Darrell Griffith	6 ft 4 in (1.93 m)	190 lb (86 kg)	1958–06–16	Louisville
G	20	Bob Hansen	6 ft 6 in (1.98 m)	190 lb (86 kg)	1961–01–18	Iowa
G	25	Eddie Hughes	5 ft 10 in (1.78 m)	165 lb (75 kg)	1960–05–26	Colorado State
F	43	Marc Iavaroni	6 ft 8 in (2.03 m)	210 lb (95 kg)	1956–09–15	Virginia
G	11	Bart Kofoed	6 ft 4 in (1.93 m)	210 lb (95 kg)	1964–03–24	Nebraska–Kearney
F	32	Karl Malone	6 ft 9 in (2.06 m)	250 lb (113 kg)	1963–07–24	Louisiana Tech
F	33	Scott Roth	6 ft 8 in (2.03 m)	212 lb (96 kg)	1963–06–03	Wisconsin
F	22	Carey Scurry	6 ft 7 in (2.01 m)	188 lb (85 kg)	1962–12–04	Long Island
G	12	John Stockton	6 ft 1 in (1.85 m)	170 lb (77 kg)	1962–03–26	Gonzaga
F	4	Kelly Tripucka	6 ft 6 in (1.98 m)	220 lb (100 kg)	1959–02–16	Notre Dame
C	54	Melvin Turpin	6 ft 11 in (2.11 m)	240 lb (109 kg)	1960–12–28	Kentucky

Coaches
Head coach
- Frank Layden
Assistant(s)
- Scott Layden
- Jerry Sloan

Legend
- (DP) Unsigned draft pick
- (FA) Free agent
- (S) Suspended
- Injured

== Regular season ==
=== Season standings ===
Midwest Division	W	L	PCT	GB	Home	Road	Div
y-Denver Nuggets	54	28	.659	–	35–6	19–22	18–12
x-Dallas Mavericks	53	29	.646	1	33–8	20–21	20–10
x-Utah Jazz	47	35	.573	7	33–8	14–27	18–12
x-Houston Rockets	46	36	.561	8	31–10	15–26	13–17
x-San Antonio Spurs	31	51	.378	23	23–18	8–33	12–18
Sacramento Kings	24	58	.293	30	19–22	5–36	9–21

#	Western Conference				
#	Team	W	L	PCT	GB
1	z-Los Angeles Lakers	62	20	.756	–
2	y-Denver Nuggets	54	28	.659	8
3	x-Dallas Mavericks	53	29	.646	9
4	x-Portland Trail Blazers	53	29	.646	9
5	x-Utah Jazz	47	35	.573	15
6	x-Houston Rockets	46	36	.561	16
7	x-Seattle SuperSonics	44	38	.537	18
8	x-San Antonio Spurs	31	51	.378	31
9	Phoenix Suns	28	54	.341	34
10	Sacramento Kings	24	58	.293	38
11	Golden State Warriors	20	62	.244	42
12	Los Angeles Clippers	17	65	.207	45

== Game log ==
=== Regular season ===
1987–88 game log
Total: 47–35 (home: 33–8; road: 14–27)
November: 7–6 (home: 7–1; road: 0–5)

Game	Date	Team	Score	High points	High rebounds	High assists	Location Attendance	Record
1	November 6; 6:30 p.m. MST	@ Dallas	L 93–95	Malone (25)	Eaton (12)	Stockton (8)	Reunion Arena; 17,007	0–1
2	November 7	Sacramento	W 121–100				Salt Palace	1–1
3	November 10	@ L.A. Clippers	L 88–100				Los Angeles Memorial Sports Arena	1–2
4	November 11; 7:30 p.m. MST	Dallas	W 121–92	Malone (32)	Malone (10)	Stockton (14)	Salt Palace; 12,212	2–2
5	November 13	Phoenix	W 109–92				Salt Palace	3–2
6	November 14	@ Houston	L 93–101				The Summit	3–3
7	November 17; 7:30 p.m. MST	Denver	W 120–110	Malone (25)	Eaton (25)	Stockton (15)	Salt Palace; 11,461	4–3
8	November 18	@ Phoenix	L 80–90				Arizona Veterans Memorial Coliseum	4–4
9	November 20	Indiana	W 112–81				Salt Palace	5–4
10	November 21	@ San Antonio	L 119–120				HemisFair Arena	5–5
11	November 24; 7:30 p.m. MST	Washington	W 100–83	Malone (22)	Bailey, Eaton (14)	Green (8)	Salt Palace; 12,212	6–5
12	November 27	Houston	W 118–96				Salt Palace	7–5
13	November 30	Philadelphia	L 100–106				Salt Palace	7–6

December: 7–8 (home: 4–2; road: 3–6)

Game	Date	Team	Score	High points	High rebounds	High assists	Location Attendance	Record
14	December 2; 7:30 p.m. MST	Chicago	L 101–105	Malone (33)	Malone (14)	Stockton (11)	Salt Palace; 12,212	7–7
15	December 4	New York	W 104–92				Salt Palace	8–7
16	December 5	@ Sacramento	W 126–117				ARCO Arena	9–7
17	December 8	@ San Antonio	L 100–105				HemisFair Arena	9–8
18	December 10	@ Houston	L 93–98				The Summit	9–9
19	December 12	Golden State	W 127–93				Salt Palace	10–9
20	December 14	Seattle	W 116–95				Salt Palace	11–9
21	December 16; 5:30 p.m. MST	@ Boston	L 111–121	Malone (31)	Malone (12)	Stockton (11)	Boston Garden; 14,890	11–10
22	December 18	@ Indiana	L 97–121				Market Square Arena	11–11
23	December 19; 5:30 p.m. MST	@ Atlanta	L 124–130 (OT)	Griffith (32)	Malone (17)	Stockton (15)	The Omni; 12,515	11–12
24	December 21	@ New Jersey	L 95–106				Brendan Byrne Arena	11–13
25	December 23; 5:30 p.m. MST	@ Cleveland	W 91–83	Malone (26)	Eaton (16)	Green (6)	Richfield Coliseum; 9,202	12–13
26	December 26; 2:00 p.m. MST	L.A. Lakers	L 109–117	Malone (26)	Malone (14)	Stockton (15)	Salt Palace; 12,212	12–14
27	December 29; 7:30 p.m. MST	@ Denver	W 98–97	Malone (37)	Malone (13)	Stockton (8)	McNichols Sports Arena; 10,621	13–14
28	December 30	Golden State	W 104–103				Salt Palace	14–14

January: 5–8 (home: 4–2; road: 1–6)

Game	Date	Team	Score	High points	High rebounds	High assists	Location Attendance	Record
29	January 2	@ Sacramento	L 105–107				ARCO Arena	14–15
30	January 4; 7:30 p.m. MST	Boston	L 99–107	Malone (25)	Malone (17)	Stockton (11)	Salt Palace; 12,212	14–16
31	January 6	@ Philadelphia	L 93–116				The Spectrum	14–17
32	January 8; 7:00 p.m. MST	@ Milwaukee	W 111–107	Malone (29)	Malone (11)	Stockton (18)	MECCA Arena; 11,052	15–17
33	January 9; 6:30 p.m. MST	@ Chicago	L 91–113	Malone (25)	Malone (8)	Stockton (9)	Chicago Stadium; 17,877	15–18
34	January 13	Portland	W 116–104				Salt Palace	16–18
35	January 15	@ Seattle	L 105–124				Seattle Center Coliseum	16–19
36	January 20; 7:30 p.m. MST	Detroit	L 117–120	Malone (39)	Malone (13)	Stockton (11)	Salt Palace; 12,212	16–20
37	January 22	San Antonio	W 119–106				Salt Palace	17–20
38	January 25; 7:30 p.m. MST	Cleveland	W 119–96	Malone (36)	Malone (12)	Stockton (13)	Salt Palace; 12,212	18–20
39	January 26; 8:30 p.m. MST	@ L.A. Lakers	L 100–111	Malone, Stockton (18)	Bailey, Eaton, Malone (9)	Stockton (11)	The Forum; 17,505	18–21
40	January 29	@ Golden State	L 100–102				Oakland–Alameda County Coliseum Arena	18–22
41	January 30; 7:30 p.m. MST	Atlanta	W 115–109	Bailey (33)	Eaton (14)	Stockton (19)	Salt Palace; 12,212	19–22

February: 9–4 (home: 6–1; road: 3–3)

Game	Date	Team	Score	High points	High rebounds	High assists	Location Attendance	Record
42	February 1	Seattle	W 105–100				Salt Palace	20–22
43	February 3	Sacramento	W 123–91				Salt Palace	21–22
44	February 4	@ Portland	W 126–123				Memorial Coliseum	22–22
All-Star Break
45	February 9; 6:00 p.m. MST	@ Dallas	L 93–124	Malone (18)	Bailey (9)	Stockton (14)	Reunion Arena; 17,007	22–23
46	February 10; 7:30 p.m. MST	Dallas	W 93–80	Bailey (24)	Malone (13)	Stockton (16)	Salt Palace; 12,444	23–23
47	February 14; 7:30 p.m. MST	@ Denver	L 93–107	Malone (31)	Eaton (12)	Stockton (12)	McNichols Sports Arena; 9,971	23–24
48	February 15	Portland	W 112–94				Salt Palace	24–24
49	February 17	Phoenix	W 108–103				Salt Palace	25–24
50	February 19	@ L.A. Clippers	W 98–88				Los Angeles Memorial Sports Arena	26–24
51	February 20	L.A. Clippers	W 120–103				Salt Palace	26–25
52	February 24; 7:30 p.m. MST	Denver	L 120–123	Malone (38)	Malone (17)	Stockton (16)	Salt Palace; 12,444	27–25
53	February 26; 8:30 p.m. MST	@ L.A. Lakers	L 105–112	Malone (28)	Malone (16)	Stockton (15)	The Forum; 17,505	27–26
54	February 29	@ Sacramento	W 115–110				ARCO Arena	28–26

March: 11–5 (home: 8–1; road: 3–4)

Game	Date	Team	Score	High points	High rebounds	High assists	Location Attendance	Record
55	March 1	Houston	W 113–112				Salt Palace	29–26
56	March 4	@ Seattle	W 125–110				Seattle Center Coliseum	30–26
57	March 5	San Antonio	W 125–106				Salt Palace	31–26
58	March 7	New Jersey	W 105–81				Salt Palace	32–26
59	March 9; 5:30 p.m. MST	@ Detroit	L 98–103	Malone (26)	Malone (18)	Stockton (11)	Pontiac Silverdome; 20,623	32–27
60	March 11; 6:00 p.m. MST	@ Washington	W 109–107	Malone (34)	Malone, Turpin (8)	Stockton (16)	Capital Centre; 10,775	33–27
61	March 12	@ New York	L 105–108				Madison Square Garden	33–28
62	March 14; 7:30 p.m. MST	@ Denver	W 116–115	Bailey (31)	Eaton (12)	Stockton (20)	McNichols Sports Arena; 10,172	34–28
63	March 16; 7:30 p.m. MST	Dallas	W 120–105	Malone (29)	Malone (17)	Stockton (17)	Salt Palace; 12,444	35–28
64	March 18; 7:30 p.m. MST	Denver	W 118–111	Malone (30)	Eaton, Malone (10)	Stockton (15)	Salt Palace; 12,444	36–28
65	March 19	@ San Antonio	L 110–113				HemisFair Arena	36–29
66	March 22	Phoenix	W 103–96				Salt Palace	37–29
67	March 24	Sacramento	W 117–97				Salt Palace	38–29
68	March 26; 7:30 p.m. MST	Milwaukee	L 105–107	Malone (33)	Malone (14)	Stockton (18)	Salt Palace; 12,444	38–30
69	March 29; 8:30 p.m. MST	@ L.A. Lakers	L 111–122	Malone (25)	Malone (12)	Stockton (18)	The Forum; 17,505	38–31
70	March 31	Golden State	W 115–92				Salt Palace	39–31

April: 8–4 (home: 4–1; road: 4–3)

Game	Date	Team	Score	High points	High rebounds	High assists	Location Attendance	Record
71	April 2; 7:30 p.m. MST	L.A. Lakers	W 106–92	Bailey (31)	Malone (15)	Stockton (16)	Salt Palace; 12,444	40–31
72	April 5	@ Phoenix	L 106–111				Arizona Veterans Memorial Coliseum	40–32
73	April 7	@ Houston	L 107–113				The Summit	40–33
74	April 8; 6:30 p.m. MDT	@ Dallas	L 95–118	Stockton (15)	Iavaroni (6)	Stockton (9)	Reunion Arena; 17,007	40–34
75	April 11	@ Golden State	W 113–102				Oakland–Alameda County Coliseum Arena	41–34
76	April 12	L.A. Clippers	W 100–93				Salt Palace	42–34
77	April 14	Portland	L 123–128				Salt Palace	42–35
78	April 16	San Antonio	W 107–82				Salt Palace	43–35
79	April 19	@ Portland	W 129–122				Memorial Coliseum	44–35
80	April 20	@ L.A. Clippers	W 112–106				Los Angeles Memorial Sports Arena	45–35
81	April 22	@ Seattle	W 110–109				Seattle Center Coliseum	46–35
82	April 23	Houston	W 125–107				Salt Palace	47–35

1987–88 schedule

== Playoffs ==
1988 playoff game log
Western Conference First Round: 3–1 (home: 2–0; road: 1–1)

Game	Date	Team	Score	High points	High rebounds	High assists	Location Attendance	Series
1	April 28	@ Portland	L 96–108	Thurl Bailey (31)	Karl Malone (13)	John Stockton (9)	Memorial Coliseum; 12,666	0–1
2	April 30	@ Portland	W 114–105	Karl Malone (37)	Karl Malone (16)	John Stockton (13)	Memorial Coliseum; 12,666	1–1
3	May 4	Portland	W 113–108	Karl Malone (35)	Karl Malone (9)	John Stockton (16)	Salt Palace; 12,444	2–1
4	May 6	Portland	W 111–96	Karl Malone (38)	Mark Eaton (11)	John Stockton (10)	Salt Palace; 12,444	3–1

Western Conference Semifinals: 3–4 (home: 2–1; road: 1–3)

Game	Date	Team	Score	High points	High rebounds	High assists	Location Attendance	Series
1	May 8; 1:30 p.m. MDT	@ L.A. Lakers	L 91–110	Malone (29)	Bailey (8)	Stockton (16)	The Forum; 17,505	0–1
2	May 10; 9:00 p.m. MDT	@ L.A. Lakers	W 101–97	Malone (29)	Eaton (12)	Stockton (13)	The Forum; 17,505	1–1
3	May 13; 9:00 p.m. MDT	L.A. Lakers	W 96–89	Malone (29)	Eaton (14)	Stockton (12)	Salt Palace; 12,444	2–1
4	May 15; 1:30 p.m. MDT	L.A. Lakers	L 100–113	Malone (29)	Malone (11)	Stockton (13)	Salt Palace; 12,444	2–2
5	May 17; 8:30 p.m. MDT	@ L.A. Lakers	L 109–111	Bailey (28)	Malone (16)	Stockton (24)	The Forum; 17,505	2–3
6	May 19; 8:30 p.m. MDT	L.A. Lakers	W 108–80	Malone (27)	Malone (11)	Stockton (17)	Salt Palace; 12,444	3–3
7	May 21; 1:30 p.m. MDT	@ L.A. Lakers	L 98–109	Malone (31)	Malone (15)	Stockton (20)	The Forum; 17,505	3–4

1988 schedule

== Player statistics ==
Legend
GP	Games played	GS	Games started	MPG	Minutes per game
FG%	Field-goal percentage	3P%	3-point field-goal percentage	FT%	Free-throw percentage
RPG	Rebounds per game	APG	Assists per game	SPG	Steals per game
BPG	Blocks per game	PPG	Points per game

=== Season ===
Player	GP	GS	MPG	FG%	3FG%	FT%	RPG	APG	SPG	BPG	PPG
Thurl Bailey											
Darryl Dawkins											
Mark Eaton											
Rickey Green											
Darrell Griffith											
Bob Hansen											
Eddie Hughes											
Marc Iavaroni											
Bart Kofoed											
Karl Malone											
Scott Roth											
Carey Scurry											
John Stockton											
Kelly Tripucka											
Melvin Turpin											

=== Playoffs ===
Player	GP	GS	MPG	FG%	3FG%	FT%	RPG	APG	SPG	BPG	PPG
Thurl Bailey											
Mark Eaton											
Rickey Green											
Bob Hansen											
Eddie Hughes											
Marc Iavaroni											
Bart Kofoed											
Karl Malone											
Scott Roth											
John Stockton											
Kelly Tripucka											
Melvin Turpin											

== Awards and records ==
- Karl Malone, All-NBA Second Team
- John Stockton, All-NBA Second Team
- Mark Eaton, NBA All-Defensive Second Team
- Karl Malone, NBA All-Defensive Second Team
