= A. C. Green =

American basketball player (born 1963)

A.C. Green
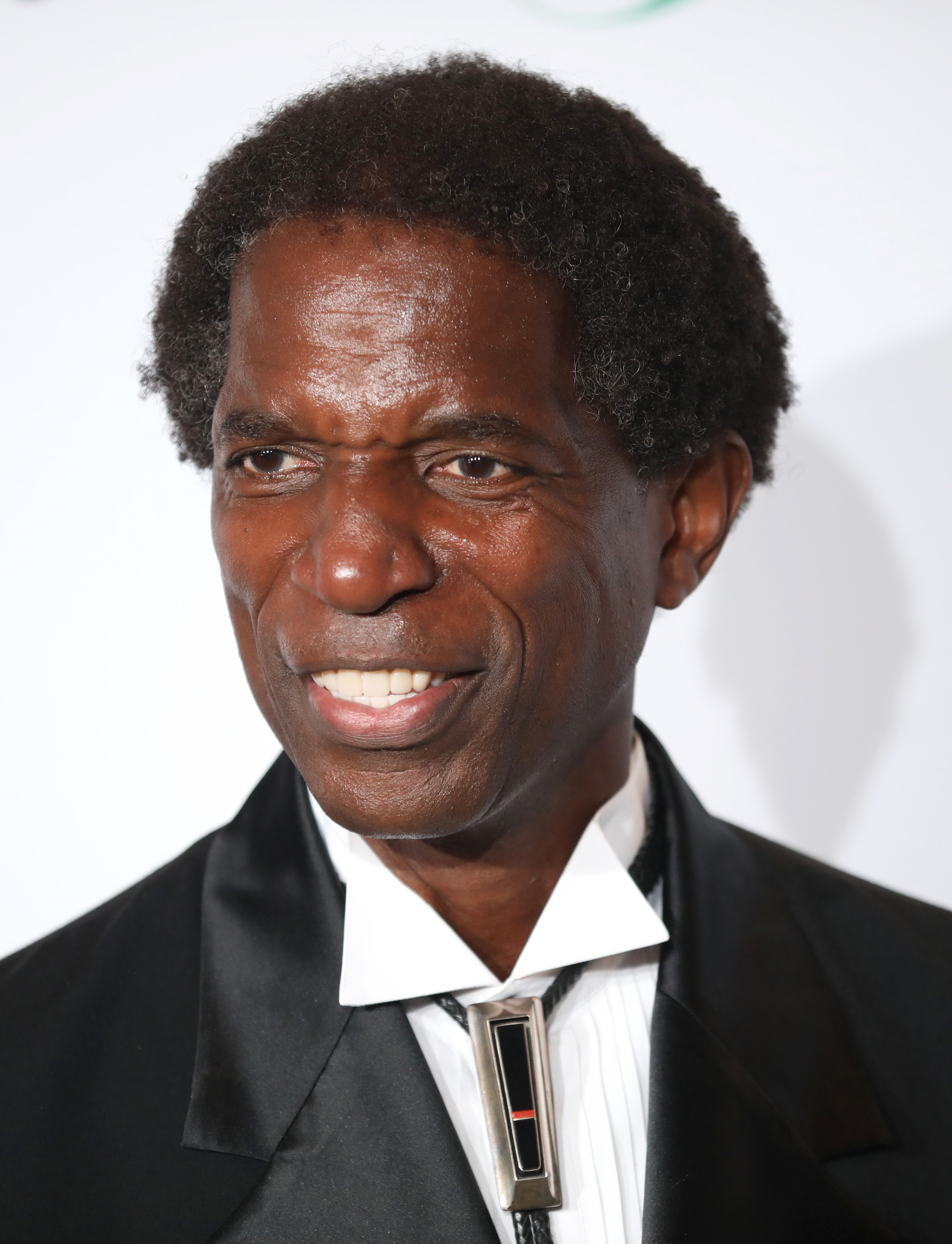
- Green in 2024

Personal information
- Born: October 4, 1963 (age 63) Portland, Oregon, U.S.
- Listed height: 6 ft 9 in (2.06 m)
- Listed weight: 225 lb (102 kg)

Career information
- High school: Benson Polytechnic (Portland, Oregon)
- College: Oregon State (1981–1985)
- NBA draft: 1985: 1st round, 23rd overall pick
- Drafted by: Los Angeles Lakers
- Playing career: 1985–2001
- Position: Power forward / small forward
- Number: 45

Career history
- 1985–1993: Los Angeles Lakers
- 1993–1996: Phoenix Suns
- 1996–1999: Dallas Mavericks
- 1999–2000: Los Angeles Lakers
- 2000–2001: Miami Heat

Career highlights
- 3× NBA champion (1987, 1988, 2000); NBA All-Star (1990); NBA All-Defensive Second Team (1989); Third-team All-American – AP, UPI (1985); Pac-10 Player of the Year (1984); 3× First-team All-Pac-10 (1983–1985); No. 45 retired by Oregon State Beavers

Career statistics
- Points: 12,331 (9.6 ppg)
- Rebounds: 9,473 (7.4 rpg)
- Steals: 1,033 (0.8 spg)
- Stats at NBA.com
- Stats at Basketball Reference

A.C. Green Jr. (born October 4, 1963) is an American former professional basketball player. Nicknamed "Iron Man", he holds a National Basketball Association (NBA) record for most consecutive regular-season games played with 1,192. Green played for the Los Angeles Lakers, Phoenix Suns, Dallas Mavericks and Miami Heat. He found most success with the Lakers, with whom he won three championships in 1987, 1988 and 2000, and was named an NBA All-Star in 1990.

Green was born and raised in Portland, Oregon, attending Benson Polytechnic High School and Oregon State University. He was inducted into the Oregon Sports Hall of Fame in 2003.

== Early life ==
A.C. Green Jr. was born on October 4, 1963, in Portland, Oregon. Green was given the initials "A.C." like his father A.C. Green Sr. The initials stand for his father's mother Amanda and his father's father Chester. Green, who had regularly attended church with his family until allowed the decision whether to do so during his high school freshman year, became a born again Christian during a Fellowship of Christian Athletes weekend retreat during his senior year of high school. He never missed a class in his educational career.

== College career ==
Green attended Oregon State University, where he finished second in school history in rebounding and fourth in scoring. He was an All-Pac-10 selection as a sophomore, and as a junior he ranked fourth in the nation in field goal percentage at .657. As a senior, he averaged 19.1 points and 9.2 rebounds and was named to the All-America Third Team. He was inducted into the Pac-12 Basketball Hall of Honor during the 2012 Pac-12 Conference men's basketball tournament, March 10, 2012.

== Professional career ==
=== Los Angeles Lakers (1985–1993) ===
The Los Angeles Lakers, fresh from winning an NBA championship, selected Green in the first round as the 23rd overall pick in the 1985 NBA draft.

Green led the Lakers in rebounding for six of his eight years on the team. Led by Magic Johnson, James Worthy and Kareem Abdul-Jabbar, Los Angeles captured back-to-back titles in 1987 and 1988, Green's second and third years with the squad. In the two campaigns combined, he averaged 11.1 points and 8.2 rebounds while shooting better than .500 from the field. Green also reached the NBA Finals with Los Angeles in 1989 and 1991. Green was named to the NBA All-Defensive Second Team in 1988–89, was voted a starter on the 1990 Western Conference All-Star Team and finished fourth in the league in field goal percentage in 1992–93 at .537.

=== Phoenix Suns (1993–1996) ===
Green left the Lakers in 1993 to sign with the Phoenix Suns as a free agent. The Suns had just reached the NBA Finals, losing in six games to the Chicago Bulls, and they viewed Green as the missing piece to their championship puzzle. Green posted a career-high average of 14.7 points per game in 1993–94, but the Suns were eliminated in the conference semifinals. In 1994–95 he again contributed double-figure scoring and solid rebounding for the Suns, but his playing time and contributions dipped in 1995–96; though he remained the team's second-leading rebounder. His streak of consecutive games played almost ended during a game with the New York Knicks when J. R. Reid intentionally elbowed him in the face. Green lost two teeth and sustained a head injury but was still able to continue on with his streak by wearing a protective mask and only playing a couple of minutes a game for a few weeks.

=== Dallas Mavericks (1997–1999) ===
Green, Sam Cassell, and Michael Finley were traded two months into the 1996–97 season to the Dallas Mavericks in a deal that brought Jason Kidd, Loren Meyer and Tony Dumas to Phoenix. In Dallas, Green brought reliable rebounding to the rebuilding Mavs. He tied Shawn Bradley for the team lead in rebounding in 1997–98 with 8.1 rpg, but his season highlight came on November 20 against Golden State when he played in his 907th consecutive game, becoming the league's all-time iron man, surpassing Randy Smith's mark of 906 consecutive games played.

Green played in his 1,000th consecutive game on March 13, 1999, against Vancouver, and finished the 1998–99 season at 1,028 in a row and counting. After 14 seasons in the league, Green had missed only three games, all during the 1986–87 season (his second in the league).

=== Return to the Lakers (1999–2000) ===
On September 1, 1999, Green was traded back to the Los Angeles Lakers for Sean Rooks and a 2000 second-round pick. During his second stint in Los Angeles, he won his last NBA championship with the Lakers by defeating the resilient Sacramento Kings in five games in the first round, his former team the Phoenix Suns also in five games in the second round and finally the talented Portland Trail Blazers in the Western Conference Finals en route to defeating the Indiana Pacers in six games to win the series and the 2000 NBA Championship, Green's third championship.

=== Miami Heat (2000–2001) ===
Green played his final NBA season with the Miami Heat where he was reunited with Pat Riley. The Heat made the playoffs, where they were swept 3–0 by the Charlotte Hornets.

=== Iron man streak ===
Green's 1,192 consecutive games played streak began on November 19, 1986, when the Los Angeles Lakers defeated the San Antonio Spurs in San Antonio. The streak ended with the last game of his career on April 18, 2001, when the Miami Heat defeated the Orlando Magic in Orlando. In addition to this streak, he also managed to miss only eight games throughout his entire playing career (all five games of the Western Conference Finals during the 1986 NBA playoffs and three games at the start of his second season).

== Personal life ==
Green visits the United States Department of Housing and Urban Development in 2004.

Green is a devout Christian. He is known for proclaiming that he began and ended his NBA career as a virgin bachelor. He was also known to abstain from smoking or drinking alcohol, even refusing to spray champagne for the cameras after winning championships. During his rookie year, his teammates sent a woman to tempt him to compromise his commitment. In 1989, he established the A.C. Green Youth Foundation, which operates youth camps to promote abstinence until marriage. In 2000, he wore a green bear on his head while on the bench during basketball games to promote his foundation.

Green married his wife Veronique in 2002.

In 2011, he was awarded the Bobby Jones Award by Athletes in Action for character, leadership, and faith in the world of basketball, in the home and the community. Green's humanitarian efforts earned him a spot in the World Sports Humanitarian Hall of Fame.

In 2015, Green was a judge for the 2015 Boost Mobile NBA D-League Slam Dunk Contest.

In 2017, Green signed to be the Director of Sports for the United Basketball Alliance of India.

== NBA career statistics ==
Legend
GP	Games played	GS	Games started	MPG	Minutes per game
FG%	Field goal percentage	3P%	3-point field goal percentage	FT%	Free throw percentage
RPG	Rebounds per game	APG	Assists per game	SPG	Steals per game
BPG	Blocks per game	PPG	Points per game	**Bold**	Career high
†	Won an NBA championship	*	Led the league

=== Regular season ===
Year	Team	GP	GS	MPG	FG%	3P%	FT%	RPG	APG	SPG	BPG	PPG
1985–86	L.A. Lakers	82	1	18.8	**.539**	.167	.611	4.6	.7	.6	.6	6.4
1986–87†	L.A. Lakers	79	72	28.4	.538	.000	.780	7.8	1.1	.9	**1.0**	10.8
1987–88†	L.A. Lakers	82	64	32.1	.503	.000	.773	8.7	1.1	**1.1**	.5	11.4
1988–89	L.A. Lakers	82*	**82***	30.6	.529	.235	**.786**	9.0	1.3	**1.1**	.7	13.3
1989–90	L.A. Lakers	82*	**82***	33.0	.478	.283	.751	8.7	1.1	.8	.6	12.9
1990–91	L.A. Lakers	82*	21	26.4	.476	.200	.738	6.3	.9	.7	.3	9.1
1991–92	L.A. Lakers	82	53	**35.4**	.476	.214	.744	**9.3**	1.4	**1.1**	.4	13.6
1992–93	L.A. Lakers	82	55	34.4	.537	**.348**	.739	8.7	1.4	**1.1**	.5	12.8
1993–94	Phoenix	82*	55	34.5	.502	.229	.735	9.2	**1.7**	.9	.5	**14.7**
1994–95	Phoenix	82*	52	32.8	.504	.339	.732	8.2	1.5	.7	.4	11.2
1995–96	Phoenix	82	36	25.8	.484	.269	.709	6.8	.9	.5	.3	7.5
1996–97	Phoenix / Dallas	**83***^{[a]}	73	30.0	.483	.050	.650	7.9	.8	.8	.2	7.2
1997–98	Dallas	82*	68	32.3	.453	.000	.716	8.1	1.5	1.0	.3	7.3
1998–99	Dallas	50*	35	18.5	.422	.000	.577	4.6	.5	.6	.2	4.9
1999–00†	L.A. Lakers	82	**82***	23.5	.447	.250	.695	5.9	1.0	.6	.2	5.0
2000–01	Miami	82	1	17.2	.444	.000	.712	3.8	.5	.4	.1	4.5
Career		1,278	832	28.6	.494	.254	.734	7.4	1.1	.8	.4	9.6
All-Star		1	1	12.0	.000	.000	.000	3.0	1.0	.0	1.0	.0

=== Playoffs ===
Year	Team	GP	GS	MPG	FG%	3P%	FT%	RPG	APG	SPG	BPG	PPG
1986	L.A. Lakers	9	–	11.8	.529	–	.444	1.8	.0	.1	.3	2.4
1987†	L.A. Lakers	18	–	28.1	**.546**	–	.747	7.9	.6	.5	.4	11.5
1988†	L.A. Lakers	**24**	–	30.3	.544	–	.753	7.3	.8	.5	.5	10.0
1989	L.A. Lakers	15	–	33.5	.412	.000	.763	9.1	1.2	1.1	.4	10.1
1990	L.A. Lakers	9	–	28.0	.519	–	.750	9.0	1.0	.6	.4	11.8
1991	L.A. Lakers	19	1	21.1	.423	**.500**	.704	5.4	.5	.6	.2	6.5
1992	L.A. Lakers	4	4	38.3	.410	–	.826	9.0	1.8	**1.8**	.0	**12.8**
1993	L.A. Lakers	5	5	**44.0**	.429	.000	.619	**14.6**	**2.6**	1.4	**.6**	9.8
1994	Phoenix	10	2	35.0	.482	.412	.613	8.4	1.3	1.0	.2	12.5
1995	Phoenix	10	10	36.8	.462	.083	.873	12.0	1.3	.6	.2	**12.8**
1996	Phoenix	4	4	21.8	.353	.000	.875	4.5	.5	.3	.0	4.8
2000†	L.A. Lakers	23	23	18.7	.411	–	.696	4.2	.6	1.6	.1	3.9
2001	Miami	3	0	7.0	.333	–	**1.000**	1.3	.7	.3	.0	1.0
Career		153	–	26.9	.475	.250	.739	7.1	.8	.7	.3	8.6

- **^{a}** Due to a mid-season trade ended up playing a career-high 83 games.

== See also ==
- List of NBA career games played leaders
