= Governor's Cup =

The Governors' Cup or Governor's Cup can refer to:

== Professional sports ==
- Governors' Cup, the baseball trophy awarded to the champion team of the International League
- Governor's Cup (Florida), awarded to the victor of the season series between the Tampa Bay Lightning and Florida Panthers hockey teams
- Governor's Cup Stakes, a Standardbred horse race alternating between racetracks in the United States and Canada
- Governor's Cup (Missouri), awarded to the victor of the Kansas City Chiefs and St. Louis Rams of the National Football League
- Governor's Cup (Texas), awarded to the victor of the Houston Texans and Dallas Cowboys of the National Football League
- Governor's Cup (Maryland), a keelboat long-distance sailing regatta across the Chesapeake Bay from Annapolis to Saint Mary's City
- Governor's Cup, the original name of the Nigerian FA Cup, the national football (soccer) cup in Nigeria
- Governor's Cup, an International Junior Match Racing Regatta in Newport Beach, California hosted by the Balboa Yacht Club
- Governor's Cup, an off-shore yacht race (and the first prize) between Cape Town and Saint Helena island
- PBA Governors' Cup, a basketball tournament held in the Philippines islands

== College sports ==
- Governor's Cup, the name of the Mississippi State–Ole Miss baseball rivalry since 2007
- Governor's Cup (Alaska), an ice hockey series hosted annually by Alaska and Alaska Anchorage
- Governor's Cup (Kansas), awarded to the victor of the football game between the Kansas State Wildcats and Kansas Jayhawks
- Governor's Cup (Kentucky), awarded to the victor of the football game between the Kentucky Wildcats and Louisville Cardinals
- Governor's Cup (Massachusetts), awarded to the victor of the Commonwealth Classic basketball game between the Boston College and University of Massachusetts Amherst teams not played since 2014
- Governor's Cup (Rhode Island), awarded to the victor of the football game between the Brown University and University of Rhode Island teams
- Governor's Cup, awarded to the victor of the football game nicknamed Clean, Old-Fashioned Hate between Georgia Institute of Technology and the University of Georgia
- Governor's Cup, awarded to the victor of the men's soccer game between University of Wisconsin–Madison and University of Wisconsin–Milwaukee
- Indiana National Guard Governor's Cup, for several varsity sports between Indiana University and Purdue University

== Other ==
- Governor's Cup (academics), an academic tournament in the state of Kentucky
- Governor's Cup, awarded to the team cooking the best cuisine at the International Bar-B-Q Festival in Owensboro, Kentucky
