= Lakers–Suns rivalry =

National Basketball Association rivalry

- Lakers vs. Suns Opening tip Game 5 of the 2010 Western Conference Finals

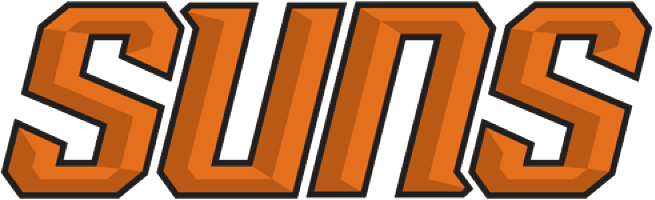
- Los Angeles Lakers Phoenix Suns
- First meeting: November 3, 1968; Lakers 127, Suns 109
- Latest meeting: November 15, 2026; Lakers 131, Suns 123
- Next meeting: February 8, 2027

Statistics
- Total meetings: 346
- All-time series: 196–150 (LAL)
- Regular season series: 156–122 (LAL)
- Postseason results: 40–28 (LAL)
- Longest win streak: LAL W10
- Current win streak: LAL W2

Postseason history
- 1970 Western Division Semifinals: Lakers won, 4–3; 1980 Western Conference Semifinals: Lakers won, 4–1; 1982 Western Conference Semifinals: Lakers won, 4–0; 1984 Western Conference Finals: Lakers won, 4–2; 1985 Western Conference First Round: Lakers won, 3–0; 1989 Western Conference Finals: Lakers won, 4–0; 1990 Western Conference Semifinals: Suns won, 4–1; 1993 Western Conference First Round: Suns won, 3–2; 2000 Western Conference Semifinals: Lakers won, 4–1; 2006 Western Conference First Round: Suns won, 4–3; 2007 Western Conference First Round: Suns won, 4–1; 2010 Western Conference Finals: Lakers won, 4–2; 2021 Western Conference First Round: Suns won, 4–2

Locations of the Los Angeles Lakers and Phoenix Suns.

The Lakers–Suns rivalry is a National Basketball Association (NBA) rivalry between the Los Angeles Lakers and the Phoenix Suns. The rivalry began as early as the 1969–70 season when the Lakers and Suns met against each other in the first round of the 1970 NBA playoffs, with peaks being had throughout the 1980s, early 1990s, and 2000s. While the Lakers won every playoff series from their 3–1 series comeback in 1970 until 1989, the Suns have won the vast majority of playoff series matchups since 1990, winning 5 of the last 7 playoffs series since then, including a reverse series sweep against the Lakers in 1993 and a 3–1 comeback of their own in 2006. While the rivalry cooled off during the 2010s due to poor teams and management by both squads throughout that decade, renewed interest in the rivalry sparked into the 2020s. With 13 head-to-head playoff meetings, this is the most frequently played playoff matchup in the history of the Western Conference.

== Background ==
The Lakers were founded in 1947 for the National Basketball League (a predecessor of the NBA) after the Detroit Gems folded their organization and sold off their assets (which mainly consisted of equipment at the time) to Bob Berger and Morris Chalfen to create the Minneapolis Lakers in Minneapolis, Minnesota (Minnesota's nickname is "The Land of 10,000 Lakes"). Under their first few seasons of existence, the Lakers saw immediate success as a franchise, winning an NBL championship, a WPBT championship, a BAA championship, and four NBA championships (including the first championship under the NBA name while under the Central Division and a three-peat from 1952 to 1954 under the Western Division) during six of their seven years in Minneapolis, primarily winning with center George Mikan being on their team. The combination of championships made the Lakers arguably the first dynasty in professional basketball history. However, a combination of less than stellar results after Mikan's multiple departures from the team, poor attendance, and a look at how the Brooklyn Dodgers successfully transitioned into the Los Angeles Dodgers led to the Lakers moving from Minneapolis to Los Angeles in 1960, keeping the team name despite a lack of natural lakes in the area. By the end of the 1960s, the Lakers created arguably one of the first superteams in the NBA with Wilt Chamberlain joining a roster that also included star players Elgin Baylor and Jerry West.

The Suns, meanwhile, were founded in the NBA in 1968 alongside the Milwaukee Bucks as one of two expansion teams that year. The Phoenix team was named the Suns above over 28,000 possible options that were listed in their "name the team" contest due to the city of Phoenix, Arizona's nickname of "Valley of the Sun". Incidentally, there was originally a semi-pro football team in the Western Professional Football League that was also named the Phoenix Suns before the NBA team existed, though the owner of that team would later settle with the NBA team out of court, according to a 1981 report from The Arizona Republic. During the 1968 NBA expansion draft, the Suns selected Gail Goodrich, John Wetzel, and Dennis Hamilton from the Lakers in the expansion draft, though only Goodrich and Wetzel ultimately played for the Suns. The Suns also acquired a Lakers draft pick in 1968 named Eddie Biedenbach during free agency. By contrast, the Suns tied with the Bucks for the worst record of their inaugural season with a 16–66 record, with the Lakers winning their first six straight games against the Suns that season. In the following season, the Suns lost a coin flip to acquire Lew Alcindor (later named Kareem Abdul-Jabbar) in the 1969 NBA draft (which is considered a key point where fans considered there to be a curse on the franchise), though they did acquire forward Connie Hawkins in free agency to help improve their fortunes a bit early on. In addition to the geographical location similarities, the rivalry between the Suns and the Lakers has been a key point for Arizona-based professional sports teams to have heated rivalries against other Los Angeles-based professional sports teams throughout the years.

== Early history (1968–1989) ==
While the Phoenix Suns first began their existence in 1968, their rivalry with the Lakers truly began as early as the 1969–1970 season after the Suns got their first regular season win against the Lakers on November 7, 1969. During that season, the Suns won their regular season against the Lakers 4–3 (including an overtime win on February 7, 1970, for their first competitive match to go to overtime). However, they also faced some different struggles during that season, including a point where head coach Johnny Kerr was replaced by general manager Jerry Colangelo exiting 1969 and entering 1970. Despite ending the season with a 39–43 record and barely qualifying as a No. 4 seed for their first playoff appearance in 1970 after losing their tiebreaker to the Chicago Bulls, their opponent in what was known as the Western Division Semi-finals was the No. 2 seeded Lakers, who finished their season at 46–36 in their division that season behind the Atlanta Hawks. After losing the first game in Los Angeles, the Suns managed to surprise the Lakers in the next three games afterward through key performances by Hawkins, Goodrich, and Paul Silas, with a chance to complete the upset the day after finishing Game 4. However, both Wilt Chamberlain and Jerry West ramped up their quality of play throughout the rest of the series and completed the second ever 3–1 series comeback in NBA history (with the first 3–1 series comeback happening in 1968 by the Boston Celtics against the Philadelphia 76ers). After the Lakers lost the 1970 NBA Finals to the New York Knicks, the Western Division turned into the Western Conference due to greater expansion in the NBA, with the Lakers joining the Pacific Division since then and the Suns briefly joining the Midwest Division before joining the Lakers in the Pacific Division as of 1972.

Throughout the rest of the 1970s, the Lakers and Suns would not meet each other in the playoffs. However, both of them were able to have competitive success during the decade, with the Lakers winning the 1972 NBA Finals in a rematch against the Knicks while holding what was considered at the time to be the best record ever at 69–13 and the Suns reaching the 1976 NBA Finals as unexpected underdogs against the Boston Celtics with a more pedestrian 42–40 record. They would also have varying failures involved under what can be considered as the biggest time of parity in NBA history, with the Suns not returning to the playoffs until 1976 through coach John MacLeod (with the 1971–72 Suns notably having the best record to not make it to the playoffs at 49–33) and the Lakers failing to make it to the playoffs during the mid-1970s, even during the season they acquired Kareem Abdul-Jabbar from the Bucks. Both the Lakers and Suns also had competitive games against each other during that decade despite not meeting each other in the playoffs after 1970. The end of the 1970s decade for the Lakers is most notable for two important moments: the selling of the Lakers from Jack Kent Cooke to Jerry Buss and the acquisition of the 1979 NBA draft's No. 1 pick, Magic Johnson.

The 1980s decade is most notable for it being the era of the Showtime Lakers, which was primarily led by Magic and Kareem on offense and Michael Cooper on the defensive end. With those three players being their primary players that stayed throughout the most important years of the decade alongside other important players that joined them throughout the decade (including another No. 1 pick in James Worthy), the Lakers both won 5 NBA Finals championships throughout that decade (one of them being coached by Paul Westhead after letting go of coach Jack McKinney due to a near-fatal head injury and the rest being coached by former player Pat Riley after firing Westhead) and were the most dominant Western Conference team of the 1980s decade. It was also the most consistent time that both teams met against each other in the playoffs, as the Suns met the Lakers four out of six times throughout the early 1980s due to acquisitions of players like Walter Davis, Truck Robinson, Dennis Johnson, and Larry Nance early on in that period of time. However, regardless of which round the Suns played the Lakers in, the Lakers would always dominate the Suns during that period, with the 1984 Western Conference Finals being the only time the Suns got more than one win over the Lakers in that decade. The late 1980s were one of the worst periods for the Suns, however, due to not just key players like Paul Westphal and Alvan Adams reaching retirement and coach John MacLeod no longer making a viable difference for the team, but also due to a scandalous period of time where players like Walter Davis, James Edwards, Jay Humphries, and Grant Gondrezick were taking illicit drugs (primarily cocaine) and damaging the team's reputation in the process, which subsequently later led to the sudden death of the young center Nick Vanos at the Northwest Airlines Flight 255 crash. The sudden shift into being one of the worst teams led to the Suns making more bold, daring choices near the end of the decade by not just having general manager Jerry Colangelo become the new owner of the team as well (which helped save the Suns from potentially moving elsewhere and prematurely ending their rivalry by extension), but also led to them making a gutsy trade with Larry Nance, Mike Sanders, and their 1988 first round pick being traded to the Cleveland Cavaliers for Kevin Johnson, Mark West, Tyrone Corbin, and multiple draft picks (one of which became fan favorite Dan Majerle) during the 1987–88 season, as well as fire former player turned coach John Wetzel for a return of Cotton Fitzsimmons coaching them (after previously doing so in the early 1970s) and sign Tom Chambers as the first ever unrestricted free agent during the following season. Those moves led to an immediate payoff for one of the biggest improvements from one season to the next for a franchise, though they still failed to defeat the Lakers in the playoffs by the end of the decade, being swept 4–0 in part due to their inexperience when compared to how the Showtime Lakers performed.

== The 1990s and Early 2000s ==
By the start of the 1990s, the Lakers were nearing the end of their Showtime era of basketball with Kareem Abdul-Jabbar retiring, most of their other key players from that decade either retiring or leaving the Lakers (including Kurt Rambis later joining the Suns in the 1989–90 season), and the rest of their key players getting older and not keeping up with their system like they used to. Despite the end coming closer, the Lakers still managed to get the best record in the NBA at 63–19, while the Suns were getting closer to their caliber with a third-place finish in the Western Conference and second-place finish in the Pacific Division. This helped culminate into a rematch of the 1989 Western Conference Finals in the semi-final round in 1990, as the Suns hoped to overcome their personal demons during that series (Cotton Fitzsimmons had a 0–37 record against the Lakers when coaching in the Great Western Forum at the time and the Suns not only hadn't won a playoff series yet to the Lakers, but they also lost 21 straight games while in The Forum dating back to 1984). The Suns managed to take their first step forward in their playoff rivalry with the Lakers by stealing Game 1 from the Lakers at the Great Western Forum with great performances by Tom Chambers, Mark West, and Kevin Johnson being key leaders in their 104–102 win. While the Lakers delivered a crushing blow to the Suns in Game 2 to even the series up, having home court advantage the rest of the way led to the Suns getting a 3–1 series lead over the Lakers at the Arizona Veterans Memorial Coliseum, with a chance to defeat the Lakers in the playoffs for the first time ever after failing to do so back in 1970. However, Magic Johnson and the Lakers weren't going to let them win the series that easily, as they commanded a 15-point lead early in Game 5 with Magic scoring a game-high 43 points as their de facto team leader. However, the Suns' own Johnson in Kevin Johnson had a comparable performance of his own with 37 points and 8 assists, with Mark West's 16 rebounds helping the Suns pull off a 106–103 upset win to defeat the Lakers for the first time ever in the playoffs. While the Suns ultimately failed to reach the NBA Finals that year, players like Tom Chambers and Eddie Johnson felt like they had truly made it with the series. After the series, Pat Riley stepped down as Lakers head coach and was replaced with Mike Dunleavy Sr. and left behind Michael Cooper to have one last shot at a championship with the Showtime Lakers before failing to defeat the Chicago Bulls (led by Michael Jordan and Scottie Pippen with Phil Jackson coaching them) and leaving behind the Showtime era for good with the unexpected announcement of Magic Johnson having HIV and subsequently retiring by force of fear of the disease afterward.

After the Suns failed to return to the conference finals the following two seasons afterward, they decided they needed a big-time splash in their name with a trade. In their first season moving out of the Veterans Memorial Coliseum and into America West Arena (now known as the Mortgage Matchup Center), Phoenix made the bold move to trade All-Star guard Jeff Hornacek and forwards Andrew Lang and Tim Perry to the Philadelphia 76ers for a superstar caliber power forward named Charles Barkley. With Barkley on the team alongside champion guard Danny Ainge and rookies Richard Dumas and Oliver Miller, the Suns saw immediate results with what was their best season yet at the time with a 62–20 regular season record for the best record in the NBA for the 1992–93 season, with Barkley being the Suns' first ever MVP winner. By contrast, the Lakers were trying to stay competitive without Magic Johnson around, but were severely reeling without his presence to the point where they fired Mike Dunleavy Sr. and replaced him with Randy Pfund after their first season without Magic. At the end of Pfund's first season with the Lakers, they had their worst season since the 1974–75 season, though they still barely qualified for the 1993 NBA playoffs despite their 39–43 record. While the Lakers were expected to have trouble with the Suns in the first round for a change of pace, the Lakers (now being led by James Worthy, A.C. Green, and Vlade Divac alongside surprise performances by Sedale Threatt) managed to stun the city of Phoenix by stealing the first two games of the series against the Suns at America West Arena, being one win away from being the first No. 8 seed to upset a No. 1 seed in the NBA. After the end of Game 2, coach Westphal made a bold guarantee during the postgame Q&A to the media.

We're down 0–2 and I know the next question is, 'are you guys dead?' No, we're going to win the series. We're going to win one [on] Tuesday, then the next game's Thursday, we'll win there, and we'll come back home and we'll win the series on Sunday. And everybody will be saying what a great series it was.

— Paul Westphal,

Despite initial critiques from the media, Barkley showed his support for Westphal there while noting the toughness of the situation at hand. This led to Barkley and the Suns bouncing back to win a hard-fought Game 3 and having a much easier Game 4 in the Great Western Forum before returning home to a decisive Game 5 back at the America West Arena. While the Suns made sure to hold the lead by the end of the third quarter, the Lakers under Worthy's leadership saw it to their best capabilities to steal not just the lead, but the series from the Suns by the end of the fourth quarter. However, a key shot late in the game by Dan Majerle led to the game going into overtime, which was where the Suns completely dominated the Lakers for good to win 112–104 and ultimately win their series 3–2, avoiding infamous history being made. This season also was the second time they reached the NBA Finals, though they would lose it to the Chicago Bulls also, this time 4–2 with a notable three-point shot by John Paxson sealing the deal there.

While the Suns couldn't return to the NBA Finals while they had Charles Barkley around due primarily to the Houston Rockets, the Lakers were able to regain Magic Johnson on their roster briefly in 1994 when he became a head coach for them in the early half of that year. Magic Johnson also returned to the Lakers as a player properly in early 1996, where he helped make the Lakers appear to be one of the top teams of the NBA once again. However, Johnson's return to the playoffs ended with a whimper as outside of a 104–94 Game 2 win, the Lakers lost 3–1 in the first round to the then-two-time champion Houston Rockets. 1996 was also a very important year for both teams during the NBA draft, as the Lakers and Suns had acquired key players that became important figures within their histories that year, with the Lakers getting Kobe Bryant from the Charlotte Hornets at pick No. 13 (alongside Derek Fisher with their own pick at #24) and the Suns drafting Steve Nash at pick No. 15. The 1996–97 season was also important for moves that shifted team trajectories, with the Lakers signing center Shaquille O'Neal after feeling the Orlando Magic were ungrateful to him and the Suns trading Charles Barkley to the Houston Rockets after feeling disappointed with recent moves Phoenix made to compete, which subsequently led to the Suns trading Robert Horry (and Joe Kleine) to the Lakers for the return of Cedric Ceballos (and Rumeal Robinson) after Horry had a confrontation with new coach Danny Ainge during a game. While both teams remained playoff competitive during that time (despite the Suns losing their first 13 games in their first season without Barkley), the Lakers saw much more significant success with their new key additions to the team. With Shaq & Kobe joining the Lakers, the team improved from every one of their final seasons in the 20th century (aside from the 1998–99 lockout shortened season) to the point of being considered championship contenders the more seasons they played together, with their apex of greatness coming from the 1999–2000 season when they had a 67–15 record with Phil Jackson coaching the Lakers and Shaq being the league's MVP that season.

During that same season, the Shaq & Kobe led Lakers saw the Suns in the Western Conference Semi-finals in their first appearances of the 21st century, with Phoenix implementing what they called "Backcourt 2000" led by the duo of Shaq's former teammate Anfernee "Penny" Hardaway and Jason Kidd, as well as the brief returns of Kevin Johnson and Oliver Miller, Sixth Man of the Year Rodney Rogers, and rookie Shawn Marion. While the Suns beat one rivaling team in the San Antonio Spurs during the 2000 playoffs, they couldn't do the same with another, much bigger rivaling team in the Lakers, as their roster under Shaq's dominating presence (alongside Kobe's shooting, Brian Shaw's playmaking capabilities, and Robert Horry's all-around peskiness) led to the Lakers defeating the Suns 4–1, with Phoenix's only win that series coming in Game 4 with Clifford Robinson and Jason Kidd upsetting the Lakers in the America West Arena. This eventually led to not just the Lakers winning the 2000 NBA Finals, but getting a three-peat in the early 2000s and one of the most infamous examples of a superteam in NBA history with old superstar players Karl Malone and Gary Payton joining Shaq & Kobe in an attempt to win the 2004 NBA Finals. Meanwhile, injuries to Hardaway and domestic abuse by Kidd led to "Backcourt 2000" reaching an end by the 2001–02 season alongside the Suns' playoff streak they had since 1988, with their lowest point in the 2000s decade coming in the 2003–04 season with Stephon Marbury being traded to New York, a young Amar'e Stoudemire being injured, owner Jerry Colangelo nearly reaching his limits, and a young, inexperienced roster needing new leadership on what they needed to do for future success.

== Seven Seconds or Less (2004–2010) ==
Kobe Bryant goes up for a shot against the Phoenix Suns double team. As Bryant's shot misses, Ron Artest (now named Metta Sandiford-Artest), left, gets the offensive game winning putback, Game 5 of the 2010 Western Conference Finals

During the same season Jerry Colangelo sold the Phoenix Suns to longtime fan and business owner Robert Sarver, they reacquired star point guard Steve Nash from the Dallas Mavericks in free agency after previously having him from 1996 until 1998. With Nash and Quentin Richardson being added to the young roster led at the time by Marion, Stoudemire, and Joe Johnson, the Suns began what was considered the "Seven Seconds or Less" era of Phoenix Suns basketball. Their fast-paced style of basketball was considered the more modernized equivalent of the Showtime Lakers that focused on primarily getting the offense ready and prepared to score in seven seconds or less. With that style of play in mind, the Suns tied what was their best regular season record at the time of 62–20 with Steve Nash winning the MVP award in his first season back in Phoenix.

The Lakers, meanwhile, had to deal with the aftermath of their failed superteam for the 2004–05 season, with Shaq & Kobe feuding to the point where Shaq demanded a trade to the Miami Heat (which got the Lakers Lamar Odom, Caron Butler, Brian Grant, and 2006 first round pick Jordan Farmar), Gary Payton was traded to their greater longtime rivals in the Boston Celtics, Karl Malone retired from playing altogether, Derek Fisher signed a long-term deal with the Golden State Warriors, and Phil Jackson was briefly fired from coaching and was replaced by longtime Houston Rockets coach Rudy Tomjanovich. Ironically, the Suns considered signing Kobe Bryant on a major deal (around six years worth $100 million) when he was open for free agency in 2004, but the emphasis on signing Steve Nash took them out of the competition for Kobe's services. Regardless, the Lakers tried their best to make their bad situation work out with what they had at the time, to the point where they started out the season with a 24–19 record. However, Tomjanovich was forced to resign from his position after his bladder cancer diagnosis got worse after his initial hiring, which left him replaced with assistant coach Frank Hamblen taking on the interim head coach role for the rest of the season. That led to the Lakers failing to reach the playoffs for the first time since 1994 with a 34–48 record, as well as them reneging on their decision with Phil Jackson, as they brought him back to coach for a second stint.

During the following season, the Lakers saw some fair improvement with Phil Jackson's coaching return, as he alongside Kobe Bryant's great scoring prowess (including an 81-point game that season) led the Lakers to an improved 45–37 record, earning them the No. 7 seed. However, the Suns still led the Pacific Division despite the frugal departures of Joe Johnson and Quentin Richardson and the season-long injury to Amar'e Stoudemire due to Steve Nash's growing leadership as a player combined with new additions like Boris Diaw (who became the Most Improved Player of the Year that season), Raja Bell, and both Kurt and Tim Thomas making sure the team didn't miss a beat along the way. With Phoenix winning the Pacific Division for the second season in a row and Steve Nash winning his second MVP in a row, this gave the Lakers ample motivation early on in the series. After losing Game 1 due to Tim Thomas' offense and Steve Nash's playmaking capabilities, Kobe Bryant turned up his playing capabilities to first win Game 2 with his overall play and then be the primary playmaker for players like Smush Parker and Lamar Odom to take Game 3 in the Staples Center (now Crypto.com Arena). For Game 4, while Lamar Odom was the leading scorer and former No. 1 pick Kwame Brown was the leading rebounder, it was Bryant that ultimately won the Lakers Game 4 in overtime with a buzzer-beating two-pointer to win 99–98 and take the series 3–1, thus giving the Lakers a second chance at an upset over the Suns. However, just when it felt like the Lakers would pull off the upset in the first round this time around, the Suns managed to fight back first by having Boris Diaw record a near-triple-double and then by Raja Bell pulling a clothesline move on Kobe that resulted in Bell being ejected for Game 5 and suspended for Game 6, but also sending a message that they weren't going down that easily with a 114–97 win. While the Suns entered the Staples Center undermanned for Game 6, their starting line-up led by Nash & Shawn Marion made sure to keep them competitive throughout the entire game. However, it was a buzzer-beating fourth-quarter three-pointer by Tim Thomas that helped save the series for Phoenix, as his shot sent that game into overtime and gave the Suns their second wind to win 126–118 to tie the series up again, despite Kobe scoring 50 points throughout the game. The Lakers had one last chance to pull off an upset of their own in Phoenix, but an early first quarter rout by the Suns led to Kobe Bryant ultimately giving up on the team by the second half (feeling as though he was the only guy that was actually trying to win that series up until that point), which led to the Suns getting a 121–90 blowout win (led by sixth man Leandro Barbosa alongside Shawn Marion and Steve Nash) at the recently renamed U.S. Airways Center and avenging their 3–1 series loss to the Lakers back in 1970.

The following season saw a repeat in standings with the Lakers finishing in 7th place once again (this time getting a more disappointing 42–40 record) and the Suns finishing in 2nd place to win the Pacific Division once again while seeing a more improved 61–21 record with Amar'e Stoudemire returning to action (being an All-NBA First Team member alongside Steve Nash that year, being the first teammates to be on the First Team since Shaq & Kobe back in 2004) and both Boris Diaw and Raja Bell keeping the same form of play they had earlier on in the prior season. This led to the Lakers and Suns seeing each other in the first round once again. This time, though, the Suns felt more prepared to take on the Lakers with Amar'e back in action, as Phoenix easily took the first two games at home, with Amar'e, Shawn Marion, and Steve Nash controlling Game 1 and everyone on the Suns taking command of Game 2 (though most notably Leandro Barbosa) with Kobe Bryant scoring only 15 points in the second game. Phoenix looked to have continued to take control for Game 3 at first, but foul trouble by Stoudemire and Bell combined with Kobe's offense and Lamar Odom's rebounding taking over led to the Lakers getting a 95–89 win on their home court. The Lakers then tried to even the series back up again at 2–2, but highlight double-double performances by Stoudemire, Nash, and Marion ultimately were too much for Kobe and the Lakers to overcome for Game 4, leading to a 113–100 win for a 3–1 series lead. Not wanting to leave anything up to chance, the Suns led by Amar'e, Nash, Marion, and Barbosa made sure to not give Kobe Bryant, Lamar Odom, and the Lakers any chances for a series comeback of their own, making sure to beat the Lakers 119–110 at home for the 4–1 series win and their tenth win in eleven straight games. After the series ended, Kobe Bryant was interested in being traded out of the Lakers due to perceived moves like drafting Andrew Bynum and trading for Smush Parker being seen as rebuilding to his eyes. Ironically, the Suns were one of the top teams that Kobe was interested in being traded to alongside the rivaling San Antonio Spurs and Chicago Bulls, but no trades ever happened with him and due to later moves like re-signing Derek Fisher to the team, Kobe ultimately stayed with the Lakers for the rest of his career.

The 2007–08 season saw major trades for both teams occur, with different outcomes occurring for them in terms of success. For the Lakers, they traded away Kwame Brown, Javaris Crittenton, the recently retired turned re-signed Aaron McKie, the draft rights to a young and inexperienced Marc Gasol, a 2008 first round pick, a 2010 first round pick, and cash considerations to acquire star center Pau Gasol and a 2010 second round pick from the Memphis Grizzlies after Andrew Bynum was confirmed out for the rest of the season. It was a trade that was widely criticized at the time due to how unbalanced it looked in favor of the Lakers, with rivaling coach Gregg Popovich specifically commenting that a committee should be formed to "scratch all trades that make no sense". Regardless of the controversy at the time, not only was the trade approved, but it made the Lakers immediate contenders once again, as they not only regained command of the Pacific Division, but they also went as far as the 2008 NBA Finals immediately with that trade before ultimately winning the NBA Finals in 2009 with Pau Gasol on board. As for the Suns, after doing more trades that had them going for salary cap relief under the new leadership of general manager Steve Kerr, they traded an increasingly unsatisfied Shawn Marion and Marcus Banks to the Miami Heat for Kobe Bryant's former teammate, Shaquille O'Neal. The move was considered the end of the "Seven Seconds or Less" era at the time, as they left behind the quick run-and-gun movement of play to have an alternative of that with the brief "Seven Seconds or Shaq" experiment instead. It also led to the Suns having a quick first round elimination to the San Antonio Spurs that later resulted in them failing to reach the 2009 NBA playoffs entirely due to less than good coaching from new coach Terry Porter and an untimely injury to Amar'e Stoudemire three games after Alvin Gentry took over.

Despite the great performances the team had when they were at full strength under Gentry, the Suns decided to trade Shaq to the Cleveland Cavaliers for the salary dump of Ben Wallace. Doing that allowed the Suns to retain Jason Richardson, Grant Hill, and Jared Dudley, as well as sign Channing Frye, Louis Amundson, and Jarron Collins in free agency to help refortify the original strengths of the Seven Seconds or Less era teams while also looking to improve their bench units with second-year players Robin Lopez and Goran Dragić also helping out Leandro Barbosa. While the Suns didn't reclaim the Pacific Division title that year, they did improve their previous performances just enough to become the No. 3 seed of the Western Conference that year. After beating the Portland Trail Blazers in six games and surprisingly sweeping the newly-rivaling San Antonio Spurs in the semi-finals after previously being a major obstacle in their championship path, the Suns saw the Lakers once again in the Western Conference Finals as their biggest obstacle from their best shot at the NBA Finals for their era of offense. Unfortunately for the Suns, the Lakers took care of their first two games at home to begin the series 2–0 with Kobe Bryant, Lamar Odom, Paul Gasol, and the rest of the team doing what they needed to do in the Staples Center. However, the Suns were able to even the series up 2–2 despite Kobe Bryant getting double-doubles in those games with Amar'e Stoudemire and Steve Nash primarily leading the way throughout the games hosted at the U.S. Airways Center, as well as a newly confident Goran Dragić tying Steve Nash in assists for Game 4. During Game 5 in Los Angeles, the Lakers held the advantage in the first half with a 21–4-point run to lead by as much as 18 points in halftime. However, a 16–4 third quarter rally led by Steve Nash and a game-tying three-pointer by Jason Richardson late in the fourth quarter gave the Suns a chance to pull off another comeback against the Lakers. However, after a missed air-ball by Kobe Bryant, Ron Artest (now named Metta Sandiford-Artest after going by Metta World Peace later in his career) grabbed an offensive rebound and scored a buzzer-beating two-pointer to give the Lakers a 103–101 win to take control of the series 3–2. The Suns had one more chance to even the series at their home court in Game 6, but despite a late comeback attempt in the fourth quarter, Bryant and Artest proved to be too much for the Suns to pull off another comeback, with the Lakers winning 111–103 to get the 4–2 series win and then the 2010 NBA Finals championship for No. 16 in their history.

== 2010s Struggles ==
After the Suns lost the 2010 Western Conference Finals, they would go into a major freefall that ultimately lasted throughout the entire 2010s decade. With Steve Kerr resigning from his position at general manager and later being replaced by Lon Babby and Lance Blanks, Robert Sarver and the Suns not only failed to retain Amar'e Stoudemire due to them not budging on a partial guarantee met by a certain number of games played instead of a full guarantee, but they also made multiple trades for lesser players throughout the 2010–11 season that ultimately ended the Seven Seconds or Less offensive style for them in general. After having an average record in the season with the 2011 NBA lockout being their final season with Steve Nash playing for them, they ultimately decided to trade Nash to the Lakers in July 2012 for a 2013 first round pick (which was from the Miami Heat, but held the option to be the Lakers' own first round pick instead had the Lakers missed the playoffs that year), a 2015 protected first round pick that eventually turned into an unprotected 2018 first round pick (which became Mikal Bridges), a 2013 second round pick from the Denver Nuggets, a 2014 second round pick, and cash considerations. The loss of key veterans like Nash, Grant Hill, and Channing Frye combined with the inexperience of the new roster they had (including replacing head coach Alvin Gentry with assistant coach Lindsey Hunter as the interim coach for the second half of their season) led to them having what was their second-worst record yet at the time at 25–57.

Meanwhile, the Lakers continued being the dominant team in the Pacific Division early on in the 2010s, remaining as a top three team in the Western Conference in their first two seasons entering the new decade, albeit failing to win a sixth championship for Kobe Bryant. However, cracks on their long-term structure first appeared when a trade they were supposed to get for star New Orleans Hornets point guard Chris Paul after the 2011 NBA lockout ended was vetoed by NBA commissioner David Stern after multiple complaints by other team owners, including Phoenix's Robert Sarver. With that season being the last season coached by Phil Jackson altogether, their 2012–13 season was expected to be a continuation of top-tier performances by the Lakers, who acquired Steve Nash from the Suns and Dwight Howard from the Orlando Magic to become a new superteam led by Mike Brown coaching the team. However, it immediately became a mess of a season between constant injuries from their top players, poor coaching by Brown leading to a new interim coach in Bernie Bickerstaff before being replaced by former Suns coach Mike D'Antoni for the rest of their season, and the untimely death of team owner Jerry Buss leading to his son Jim Buss taking over the structure of the Lakers. Despite the constant struggles and risk of missing the playoffs and their first round pick to the Suns, a late April surge by the Lakers led to them making it to the 2013 Playoffs as the No. 7 seed due to a combination of a win over the Houston Rockets and a loss to the Utah Jazz. However, the consequences of that season would prove to be a long-term disaster for the Lakers also.

The Suns did appear to return to playoff contention during the mid-2010s at first with a major revamping of the roster by new general manager Ryan McDonough and new head coach Jeff Hornacek leading them to a 48–34 season in their first season (with Goran Dragić, P.J. Tucker, and twin brothers Markieff and Marcus Morris being the only available players from the 2012–13 season to the 2013–14 season, excluding Channing Frye's return) and then a 29–25 record entering the 2015 NBA All-Star Game a season later. However, increasing dissatisfaction from players like Goran Dragić, Isaiah Thomas, and eventually Markieff Morris and Eric Bledsoe led to major trades that reversed course into trying to find new success through the NBA draft in the late 2010s instead. Both the Suns and the Lakers saw greater failures throughout the rest of the decade since their respective failure points, with increasing problems occurring for Phoenix and injuries and increasing incompetence going on with the Lakers. Both the Suns and Lakers saw greater periods of failures and low points that they hadn't seen since the early periods of their histories, with both teams also having their greatest playoff droughts in team history by 10 seasons for Phoenix and 6 seasons for the Lakers. When Kobe Bryant retired, he went on to note how the Suns kept him from winning a championship twice.

== Rivalry renewal of the 2020s ==
Before dealing with the COVID-19 pandemic, both the Lakers and the Suns saw some genuine improvements with themselves once they exited the 2010s and entered the 2020s decade. For the Lakers, the acquisition of New Orleans Pelicans power forward/center Anthony Davis they hinted at back in the 2018–19 season alongside the new coaching hire of Frank Vogel and veteran pick-ups like Rajon Rondo, Kentavious Caldwell-Pope, JaVale McGee, Danny Green, Avery Bradley, the return of Dwight Howard, and former Suns players Jared Dudley and Markieff Morris helped provide the Lakers their first playoff appearance since 2013. As for the Suns, under new head coach Monty Williams with a focus on trades for older players like Kelly Oubre Jr., Dario Šarić, Cameron Johnson, Aron Baynes, Ricky Rubio, and Jevon Carter; the Suns saw their best success before the pandemic began since 2015 with a 26–39 record. The 2019–20 NBA season suspension risked both teams failing to even have their seasons continue, never mind having the 2020 NBA playoffs occur altogether, but they were both given access to the 2020 NBA Bubble to help continue their seasons properly. Both teams saw significant success as newfound turning points once they entered the ESPN Wide World of Sports Complex in Orlando, Florida after the Suns signed Cameron Payne and the Lakers signed J. R. Smith for the Bubble, with Phoenix having a perfect 8–0 record in the Bubble (although missing the playoffs yet again) and the Lakers eventually winning the 2020 NBA Finals.

While still dealing with the long-term consequences of the pandemic for a somewhat shortened 2020–21 season, the Suns sought to make significant changes by trading Kelly Oubre Jr., Ricky Rubio, Jalen Lecque, Ty Jerome, and a 2022 first round pick to the Oklahoma City Thunder for Chris Paul and Abdel Nader. That trade alongside the signing of veteran forward Jae Crowder and a later trade for Torrey Craig helped the Suns not only end their playoff drought that began back in the 2010–11 season, but they also won the Pacific Division championship and had the second-best record of the NBA for the shortened season at 51–21 behind only the Utah Jazz. Meanwhile, the Lakers and Miami Heat (the losing 2020 NBA Finals team) had only 72 days off between the NBA Finals and the start of that season, which left not enough time for players like LeBron James and Anthony Davis to fully recover properly. Despite the inherent disadvantage, the Lakers still finished the season with a 42–30 record, leading to a seventh-place finish and a gritty win over the Golden State Warriors in the newly implemented and upgraded NBA play-in tournament to gain the 7th seed that season. Due to COVID-19 protocols at the time, neither team could fully fill up their stadiums with proper crowds, but they both made sure to provide a great first round for their rivalry being renewed since their last playoff match against each other in 2010. For Game 1, the performances of Devin Booker, Deandre Ayton, and Chris Paul from the Suns overtook the Lakers from the very start of the game, ultimately winning 99–90 in their first playoff match since 2010. For the next two games, though, the overpowering presences of Anthony Davis, LeBron James, and Andre Drummond led to the Lakers taking over the series with a 2–1 series lead with convincing victories at hand, as well as a notable moment in Game 3 where Andre Drummond was reflecting LeBron's movements offensively against Jae Crowder. For Game 4, however, Anthony Davis suffered a serious groin injury that led to him leaving the rest of the game, which subsequently led to the Suns winning 100–92 and tying the series back up again. Davis' absence in Game 5 led to the Suns blowing out the Lakers with a 115–85 score (highlighted by LeBron James willingly exiting the game in what was known as the Phoenix Suns Arena at the time with a few minutes left to go in the game) and forced the Lakers to try and get Davis back in action for Game 6. Unfortunately for the Lakers, Anthony Davis still faced serious pain with his groin during Game 6, which left him playing only limited minutes and led to Devin Booker having a series closing game of 47 points and 12 rebounds in a 113–100 win to secure a 4–2 series win over the Lakers during the last playoff series the Lakers played in for the Staples Center under that name. Phoenix eventually reached the 2021 NBA Finals, but ultimately lost to the Milwaukee Bucks 4–2.

The following season after that had the Suns record a new personal best 64–18 record leading the entire NBA that year by signing former Lakers center JaVale McGee alongside Bismack Biyombo, while the Lakers tried to have a new superteam with Russell Westbrook, Carmelo Anthony, Rajon Rondo for a second time, and Dwight Howard for a third time joining LeBron James and Anthony Davis. However, that superteam failed to even reach the play-in tournament for 2022, seeing themselves be eliminated from direct playoff contention on April 5, 2022, with a 121–110 defeat to the Phoenix Suns themselves, though Phoenix later saw a disappointing second round exit that season by Luka Dončić and the Dallas Mavericks. For the 2022–23 season, both the Suns and Lakers saw early struggles due to serious controversy with owner Robert Sarver and a failed offseason trade for Kevin Durant for Phoenix and troubles adapting to new head coach Darvin Ham and trying to make last season's superteam attempt still work for the Lakers respectively. However, with necessary adjustments combined with key trades for the Suns and Lakers by that season's trade deadline (acquiring Kevin Durant after Mat Ishbia and Justin Ishbia replaced Robert Sarver for the Suns and creating better balance over a superteam for the Lakers respectively), both teams still made it to the playoffs, with the Lakers winning another play-in tournament game (this time against the Minnesota Timberwolves). Despite the Suns having a better overall record, the 7-seeded Lakers managed to go farther in the playoffs than the Phoenix Suns via the Western Conference Finals, though both teams fell to the eventual champion Denver Nuggets, with the Suns being the only team to get more than one win against Denver.

Entering the 2023–24 season, the Phoenix Suns looked to create their own superteam with Chris Paul and Landry Shamet being traded alongside a bunch of first round picks to the Washington Wizards for star shooting guard Bradley Beal joining Devin Booker and Kevin Durant alongside mostly veteran's minimum players joining them, as well as having former Lakers coach Frank Vogel being their new head coach. Meanwhile, the Lakers looked to continue to build upon their success from the prior season by retaining most of the key players they acquired that season like D'Angelo Russell, Rui Hachimura, Austin Reaves, and Jarred Vanderbilt, as well as acquire players like Gabe Vincent and Christian Wood to help their bench unit. The second game of the season for both teams was Kevin Durant's first match against LeBron James while LeBron was in Los Angeles and Durant was in Phoenix (and their first regular season matchup in five years). Kevin Durant lead the Suns in scoring with 39 points, but LeBron helped lead the Lakers to bounce back and win 100–95 on October 28, 2023. In addition to that, the Suns and Lakers both were grouped in Group A of the inaugural NBA In-Season Tournament, with their debut game there being on November 10, 2023, at the Footprint Center. That game ended with the Lakers winning 122–119 with the Suns leading for most of the game, but the Lakers put up a 14–0 run after a buzzer-beating three-point shot by Cameron Reddish that Phoenix could not catch up from afterward. Another In-Season Tournament match happened between them during the knockout round portion of the tournament, with the Lakers being the best team of Group A and the Suns being the best team of the rest of the groups' second-best teams in the competition by point differential. Both teams met in the In-Season Quarterfinals in Los Angeles with the Lakers winning 106–103, though the game ended in controversy with the Lakers' penultimate timeout being accepted despite them not having possession of the ball at the time they called the timeout. The Lakers later ultimately won the inaugural tournament on December 9, 2023, defeating the Indiana Pacers at the T-Mobile Arena in Las Vegas, Nevada 123–109. Despite the fact that the Suns and Lakers now held 5 regular season matches against each other instead of their usual four, the Suns would win the final two matches in early 2024, with their first match being one with all of the Suns' Big 3 playing together via Bradley Beal returning from his injuries earlier in the season resulting in a 127–109 win for Phoenix in L.A. and their second match being won 123–113 in Phoenix after the trade deadline and 2024 NBA All-Star Game by a balanced team effort led primarily by Grayson Allen, new addition Royce O'Neale, Jusuf Nurkić, and Bol Bol ending the regular season between them. However, both teams would end up benefitting each other in a final playoff push to end the season with wins to end the regular season by the Suns avoiding the play-in tournament and the Lakers securing a match against the New Orleans Pelicans to later secure another playoff spot of their own, though they would both falter in the first round that season.

Following up the prior season's disappointments for both squads, both teams sought to replace their head coaches and most of their coaching staffs after disappointing first round exits, with the Suns replacing former Lakers coach Frank Vogel after only one season with them with Mike Budenholzer (the same coach that beat them in the 2021 NBA Finals) and the Lakers replacing Darvin Ham with former NBA player and analyst turned first year head coach JJ Redick. Both teams would also look to take advantage of the 2024 NBA draft under its new two-day format before they start feeling the aftereffects of previous draft trades they made for 2025 onward, with both teams also seeking interest in Bronny James, the son of LeBron James, during the draft process. The Suns would also retool their bench for this season, while the Lakers saw minuscule free agency changes. This season saw the Suns and Lakers compete against each other once again in the newly renamed Emirates NBA Cup (this time in Group B), as well as had them compete against each other early three out of four times this time around, including their Group B NBA Cup match, which the Suns won 127–100.

The Lakers–Suns game at Phoenix on December 14, 2025, was scheduled as a consolation game following their eliminations from the 2025 NBA Cup quarterfinals. Prior to that, both teams had advanced to that round—the Lakers as the West Group B winner and the Suns as the Western Conference wild-card. This matchup resulted in a five-game regular season series, marking only the second time in the rivalry's history that both teams have met this many times in a single regular season. The Lakers won that game 116–114.

== Players in both teams ==
- (United States) Gail Goodrich
- (United States) Mel Counts
- (United States) Jerry Chambers
- (United States) John Wetzel
- (United States) Keith Erickson
- (United States) Connie Hawkins
- (United States) Pat Riley
- (United States) Charlie Scott
- (United States) Corky Calhoun
- (United States) Walt Wesley
- (United States) Nate Hawthorne
- (United States) James Edwards
- (United States) Marty Byrnes
- (United States) Kurt Rambis
- (United States) Mike McGee
- (United States) Maurice Lucas
- (United States) A.C. Green
- (United States) Cedric Ceballos
- (United States) Tony Smith
- (United States) Chucky Brown
- (United States) Duane Cooper
- (United States) Joe Kleine
- (United States) Danny Schayes
- (United States) Corie Blount
- (United States) Mario Bennett
- (Canada) / (South Africa) Steve Nash
- (United States) Shaquille O'Neal
- (United States) Robert Horry
- (Jamaica) / (United States) Rumeal Robinson
- (United States) George McCloud
- (United States) Joe Crispin
- (United States) Jim Jackson
- (United States) Jumaine Jones
- (United States) Brian Grant
- (United States) Smush Parker
- (United States) Trevor Ariza
- (United States) Jared Dudley
- (United States) Matt Barnes
- (United States) Shannon Brown
- (United States) Channing Frye
- (United States) Earl Clark
- (United States) Markieff Morris
- (United States) Ronnie Price
- (United States) Michael Beasley
- (United States) Wesley Johnson
- (United States) Kendall Marshall
- (United States) Isaiah Thomas
- (Canada) Tyler Ennis
- (United States) Reggie Bullock
- (United States) Shaquille Harrison
- (United States) Davon Reed
- (United States) Tyson Chandler
- (United States) Troy Daniels
- (United States) JaVale McGee
- (United States) Damian Jones
- (The Bahamas) Deandre Ayton

== Season–by–season results ==
Los Angeles Lakers vs. Phoenix Suns Season–by–Season Results
1960s (Lakers, 9–4)

Season	Season series		at Los Angeles Lakers	at Phoenix Suns	Overall series	Notes
1968–69	Lakers	6–0	Lakers, 3–0	Lakers, 3–0	Lakers; 6–0	Phoenix Suns join the NBA as an expansion team, becoming the first major professional sports franchise in the Phoenix market and in the entire state of Arizona. They were placed in the Western Division, becoming divisional rivals with the Lakers. Lakers win the Western Division. Lakers lose 1969 NBA Finals.
1969–70	Suns	4–3	Lakers, 3–1	Suns, 3–0	Lakers; 9–4	

1970s (Lakers, 35–29)

Season	Season series		at Los Angeles Lakers	at Phoenix Suns	Overall series	Notes
1970 Western Division Semifinals	Lakers	4–3	Lakers, 3–1	Suns, 2–1	Lakers; 13–7	First postseason meeting. Lakers become the second NBA team to come back from a 3–1 series deficit. Lakers go on to lose 1970 NBA Finals.
1970–71	Suns	4–2	Suns, 2–1	Suns, 2–1	Lakers; 15–11	Lakers and Suns are placed in the Western Conference. Lakers are placed in the Pacific Division while the Suns are placed in the Midwest Division.
1971–72	Lakers	4–2	Lakers, 3–0	Suns, 2–1	Lakers; 19–13	Lakers finish with the best record in the league (69–13). Lakers win 1972 NBA Finals.
1972–73	Lakers	6–1	Lakers, 3–1	Lakers, 3–0	Lakers; 25–14	Suns are moved to the Pacific Division, once again becoming divisional rivals with the Lakers. Lakers win the Pacific Division. Lakers lose 1973 NBA Finals.
1973–74	Lakers	4–2	Lakers, 3–0	Suns, 2–1	Lakers; 29–16	Lakers win the Pacific Division.
1974–75	Tie	4–4	Lakers, 4–0	Suns, 4–0	Lakers; 33–20	
1975–76	Suns	4–2	Lakers, 2–1	Suns, 3–0	Lakers; 35–24	Suns lose 1976 NBA Finals.
1976–77	Lakers	3–1	Lakers, 2–0	Tie, 1–1	Lakers; 38–25	Lakers win the Pacific Division. Lakers finish with the best record in the league (53–29).
1977–78	Suns	3–1	Tie, 1–1	Suns, 2–0	Lakers; 39–28	
1978–79	Tie	2–2	Lakers, 2–0	Suns, 2–0	Lakers; 41–30	
1979–80	Tie	3–3	Lakers, 3–0	Suns, 3–0	Lakers; 44–33	

1980s (Lakers, 57–23)

Season	Season series		at Los Angeles Lakers	at Phoenix Suns	Overall series	Notes
1980 Western Conference Semifinals	Lakers	4–1	Lakers, 3–0	Tie, 1–1	Lakers; 48–34	Lakers go on to win 1980 NBA Finals.
1980–81	Suns	4–2	Lakers, 2–1	Suns, 3–0	Lakers; 50–38	Suns win their first Pacific Division title.
1981–82	Lakers	4–2	Suns, 2–1	Lakers, 3–0	Lakers; 54–40	Lakers finish with a winning record at Phoenix for the first time since the 1972 season. Suns finish with a winning record at Los Angeles for the first time since the 1970 season. Lakers win the Pacific Division.
1982 Western Conference Semifinals	Lakers	4–0	Lakers, 2–0	Lakers, 2–0	Lakers; 58–40	Lakers go on to win 1982 NBA Finals.
1982–83	Tie	3–3	Lakers, 2–1	Suns, 2–1	Lakers; 61–43	Lakers win the Pacific Division. Lakers lose 1983 NBA Finals.
1983–84	Tie	3–3	Lakers, 2–1	Suns, 2–1	Lakers; 64–46	Lakers win the Pacific Division.
1984 Western Conference Finals	Lakers	4–2	Lakers, 2–1	Lakers, 2–1	Lakers; 68–48	In game 2, Magic Johnson's 24 assists sets an NBA playoff record for most assists in a game. (Later tied with John Stockton.); Lakers go on to lose 1984 NBA Finals.
1984–85	Lakers	5–1	Lakers, 3–0	Lakers, 2–1	Lakers; 73–49	Lakers win the Pacific Division.
1985 Western Conference First Round	Lakers	3–0	Lakers, 2–0	Lakers, 1–0	Lakers; 76–49	Lakers go on to win 1985 NBA Finals.
1985–86	Lakers	5–1	Lakers, 3–0	Lakers, 2–1	Lakers; 81–50	Lakers win the Pacific Division.
1986–87	Lakers	5–1	Lakers, 3–0	Lakers, 2–1	Lakers; 86–51	On January 2, 1987, Lakers beat the Suns 155–118, their most points scored in a game against the Suns. Lakers win the Pacific Division. Lakers finish with the best record in the league (65–17). Lakers win 1987 NBA Finals.
1987–88	Lakers	5–1	Lakers, 3–0	Lakers, 2–1	Lakers; 91–52	Lakers win the Pacific Division. Lakers finish with the best record in the league (62–20). Lakers win 1988 NBA Finals.
1988–89	Tie	3–3	Lakers, 3–0	Suns, 3–0	Lakers; 94–55	Lakers win the Pacific Division.
1989 Western Conference Finals	Lakers	4–0	Lakers, 2–0	Lakers, 2–0	Lakers; 98–55	Lakers go on to lose 1989 NBA Finals.
1989–90	Lakers	3–1	Lakers, 2–0	Tie, 1–1	Lakers; 101–56	Lakers win 21 home games in a row against the Suns. Lakers record their 100th win over the Suns. Lakers win the Pacific Division. Lakers finish with the best record in the league (63–19).

1990s (Lakers, 29–27)

Season	Season series		at Los Angeles Lakers	at Phoenix Suns	Overall series	Notes
1990 Western Conference Semifinals	Suns	4–2	Suns, 2–1	Suns, 2–0	Lakers; 103–60	Suns win their first postseason series over the Lakers.
1990–91	Lakers	3–2	Tie, 1–1	Lakers, 2–1	Lakers; 106–62	Lakers lose 1991 NBA Finals.
1991–92	Suns	3–2	Lakers, 2–1	Suns, 2–0	Lakers; 108–65	Last season Suns played at Arizona Veterans Memorial Coliseum.
1992–93	Suns	5–0	Suns, 2–0	Suns, 3–0	Lakers; 108–70	Suns open up America West Arena (currently known as "Footprint Center"). Suns sweep the season series over the Lakers for the first time. Suns finish with a winning record in Los Angeles in the regular season for the first time since the 1981 season. Suns win the Pacific Division. Suns finish with the best record in the league (62–20).
1993 Western Conference First Round	Suns	3–2	Suns, 2–0	Lakers, 2–1	Lakers; 110–73	Suns become the 4th team in NBA history to overcome a 0–2 deficit to win a best-of-5 series. Following their loss in Game 2, Suns head coach Paul Westphal boldly guaranteed a playoff comeback. Suns go on to lose 1993 NBA Finals.
1993–94	Lakers	3–2	Lakers, 3–0	Suns, 2–0	Lakers; 113–75	
1994–95	Suns	4–1	Suns, 2–0	Suns, 2–1	Lakers; 114–79	Suns win the Pacific Division.
1995–96	Lakers	3–1	Lakers, 2–0	Tie, 1–1	Lakers; 117–80	
1996–97	Lakers	4–0	Lakers, 2–0	Lakers, 2–0	Lakers; 121–80	
1997–98	Tie	2–2	Tie, 1–1	Tie, 1–1	Lakers; 123–82	
1998–99	Lakers	3–1	Tie, 1–1	Lakers, 2–0	Lakers; 126–83	Last season Lakers played at Great Western Forum.
1999–2000	Lakers	4–0	Lakers, 2–0	Lakers, 2–0	Lakers; 130–83	Lakers open up Staples Center (now known as Crypto.com Arena). Lakers win the Pacific Division. Lakers finish with the best record in the league (67–15).

2000s (Lakers, 30–27)

Season	Season series		at Los Angeles Lakers	at Phoenix Suns	Overall series	Notes
2000 Western Conference Semifinals	Lakers	4–1	Lakers, 3–0	Tie, 1–1	Lakers; 134–84	Lakers go on to win 2000 NBA Finals.
2000–01	Lakers	3–1	Lakers, 2–0	Tie, 1–1	Lakers; 137–85	On December 28, 2000, Lakers beat the Suns 115–78, their largest victory over the Suns with a 37–point differential. Lakers win the Pacific Division. Lakers win 2001 NBA Finals.
2001–02	Tie	2–2	Lakers, 2–0	Suns, 2–0	Lakers; 139–87	Lakers win 2002 NBA Finals.
2002–03	Lakers	3–1	Lakers, 2–0	Tie, 1–1	Lakers; 142–88	
2003–04	Lakers	3–1	Tie, 1–1	Lakers, 2–0	Lakers; 145–89	Lakers win the Pacific Division. Lakers lose 2004 NBA Finals.
2004–05	Suns	4–0	Suns, 2–0	Suns, 2–0	Lakers; 145–93	Suns sweep the season series over the Lakers for the first time since the 1992 season. Suns win the season series over the Lakers and finish with a winning record in Los Angeles for the first time since the 1994 season. Suns win the Pacific Division. Suns finish with the best record in the league (62–20).
2005–06	Suns	3–1	Tie, 1–1	Suns, 2–0	Lakers; 146–96	Suns win the Pacific Division.
2006 Western Conference First Round	Suns	4–3	Lakers, 2–1	Suns, 3–1	Lakers; 149–100	In Game 4, Kobe Bryant hit both a lay–up with 0.7 seconds left to force overtime, and the game–winning jump shot at the buzzer in overtime. Suns become the 8th team in NBA history to overcome a 3–1 series deficit. First playoff series a Phil Jackson coached team has lost after taking a series lead, going 44–0 beforehand. Suns record their 100th win over the Lakers.
2006–07	Suns	3–1	Tie, 1–1	Suns, 2–0	Lakers; 150–103	Suns win the Pacific Division.
2007 Western Conference First Round	Suns	4–1	Tie, 1–1	Suns, 3–0	Lakers; 151–107	
2007–08	Lakers	3–1	Tie, 1–1	Lakers, 2–0	Lakers; 154–108	Lakers win the Pacific Division. Lakers lose 2008 NBA Finals.
2008–09	Lakers	3–1	Lakers, 2–0	Tie, 1–1	Lakers; 157–109	Lakers win the Pacific Division. Lakers win 2009 NBA Finals.
2009–10	Lakers	3–1	Lakers, 2–0	Tie, 1–1	Lakers; 160–110	Lakers win the Pacific Division.

2010s (Lakers, 24–21)

Season	Season series		at Los Angeles Lakers	at Phoenix Suns	Overall series	Notes
2010 Western Conference Finals	Lakers	4–2	Lakers, 3–0	Suns, 2–1	Lakers; 164–112	In Game 5, Ron Artest caught a missed airball by Kobe Bryant and scored the game–winner at the buzzer. Lakers go on to win 2010 NBA Finals.
2010–11	Lakers	3–1	Tie, 1–1	Lakers, 2–0	Lakers; 167–113	Lakers win the Pacific Division.
2011–12	Tie	2–2	Lakers, 2–0	Suns, 2–0	Lakers; 169–115	Lakers win the Pacific Division.
2012–13	Tie	2–2	Lakers, 2–0	Suns, 2–0	Lakers; 171–117	
2013–14	Suns	3–1	Tie, 1–1	Suns, 2–0	Lakers; 172–120	
2014–15	Suns	4–0	Suns, 2–0	Suns, 2–0	Lakers; 172–124	
2015–16	Suns	3–1	Tie, 1–1	Suns, 2–0	Lakers; 173–127	
2016–17	Tie	2–2	Tie, 1–1	Tie, 1–1	Lakers; 175–129	On February 15, 2017, Suns beat the Lakers 137–101, their largest victory over the Lakers with a 36–point differential.
2017–18	Lakers	3–1	Tie, 1–1	Lakers, 2–0	Lakers; 178–130	
2018–19	Lakers	3–1	Lakers, 2–0	Tie, 1–1	Lakers; 181–131	First season for LeBron James as a Laker.
2019–20	Lakers	3–0	Lakers, 2–0	Lakers, 1–0	Lakers; 184–131	Lakers sweep the season series over the Suns for the first time since the 1999 season. Lakers win the Pacific Division. Lakers win 2020 NBA Finals.

2020s (Suns, 19–12)

Season	Season series		at Los Angeles Lakers	at Phoenix Suns	Overall series	Notes
2020–21	Suns	2–1	Tie, 1–1	Suns, 1–0	Lakers; 185–133	Suns win the Pacific Division.
2021 Western Conference First Round	Suns	4–2	Suns, 2–1	Suns, 2–1	Lakers; 187–137	Suns go on to lose 2021 NBA Finals.
2021–22	Suns	4–0	Suns, 2–0	Suns, 2–0	Lakers; 187–141	On March 13, 2022, Suns beat the Lakers 140–111, their most points scored in a game against the Lakers. Suns win the inaugural Chuck Cooper Trophy. Suns finish with the best record in the league (64–18).
2022–23	Tie	2–2	Lakers, 2–0	Suns, 2–0	Lakers; 189–143	
2023–24	Lakers	3–2	Lakers, 2–1	Tie, 1–1	Lakers; 192–145	Lakers win the inaugural 2023 NBA Cup. The Lakers beat the Suns in both the group stage and quarterfinals games.
2024–25	Tie	2–2	Lakers, 2–0	Suns, 2–0	Lakers; 193–147	On November 26, 2024, at Phoenix, the Suns beat the Lakers 127–100 during the 2024 NBA Cup group stage. First season for Luka Doncic as a Laker.
2025–26	Suns	3–2	Tie, 1–1	Suns, 2–1	Lakers; 195–150	An additional consolation game at Phoenix was scheduled for December 14, 2025, after both teams were eliminated from the 2025 NBA Cup knockout stage. Final season for LeBron James as a Laker.
2026–27	Tie	0-0	March 17th and April 11th, 2027	November 15th, 2026 and February 8th, 2027	Lakers; 195–150	

Summary of Results

Season	Season series		at Los Angeles Lakers	at Phoenix Suns	Notes
Regular season games	Lakers	155–122	Lakers, 103–37	Suns, 85–52	
Postseason games	Lakers	40–28	Lakers, 25–10	Suns, 18–15	
Postseason series	Lakers	8–5	Lakers, 3–2	Lakers, 5–3	Western Division Semifinals: 1970; Western Conference First Round: 1985, 1993, 2006, 2007, 2021; Western Conference Semifinals: 1980, 1982, 1990, 2000; Western Conference Finals: 1984, 1989, 2010
Regular and postseason	Lakers	195–150	Lakers, 128–47	Suns, 103–67	

== See also ==
- National Basketball Association rivalries
- Diamondbacks–Dodgers rivalry
- Cardinals–Rams rivalry
