= Cardinals–Rams rivalry =

National Football League rivalry

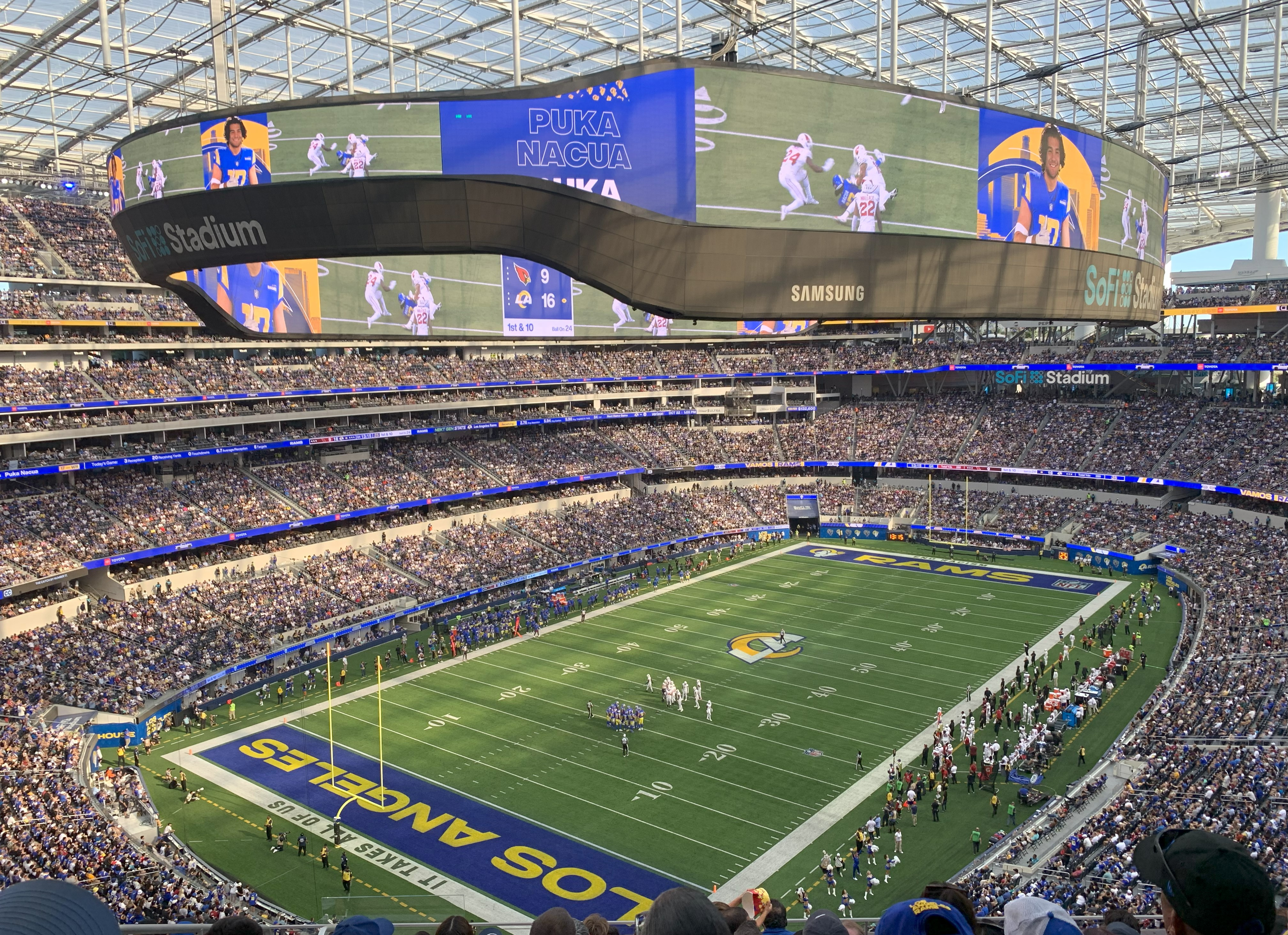
- Cardinals and Rams face off during the 2023 season.

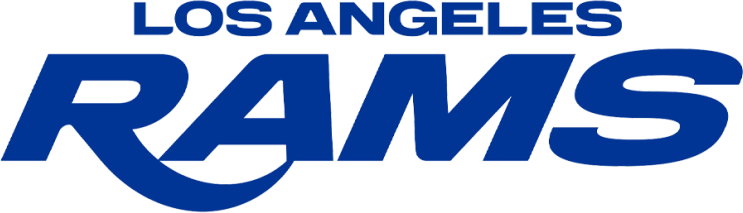
- Arizona Cardinals Los Angeles Rams
- Location: Phoenix, Los Angeles
- First meeting: October 3, 1937; Cardinals 6, Rams 0
- Latest meeting: November 15, 2026; Rams 34, Cardinals 6
- Next meeting: 2027
- Stadiums: Cardinals: State Farm Stadium; Rams: SoFi Stadium

Statistics
- Total meetings: 98
- All-time series: Rams: 54–42–2
- Regular season series: Rams: 52–42–2
- Postseason results: Rams: 2–0
- Largest victory: Cardinals: 44–6 (2016); Rams: 34–0 (2018)
- Most points scored: Cardinals: 48 (2007); Rams: 46 (1985)
- Longest win streak: Cardinals: 8 (2006–2010); Rams: 8 (2017–2021)
- Current win streak: Rams: 1 (2026–present)

Post-season history
- 1975 NFC Divisional: Rams won: 35–23; 2021 NFC Wild Card: Rams won: 34–11

The Cardinals–Rams rivalry is a National Football League (NFL) rivalry between the Arizona Cardinals and Los Angeles Rams.

One of the oldest matchups in the league, the two teams met for the first time during the NFL's infancy in 1937 back when the Cardinals were located in Chicago, and the Rams in Cleveland. State Farm Stadium and SoFi Stadium are only 375 miles apart, mostly along I-10. Both teams were also previously based in St. Louis and left to play in the Western United States.

The Rams lead the overall series 54–42–2. The two teams have met twice in the playoffs, with the Rams winning both games.

== History ==
=== Early origins ===
The Cardinals and Rams are some of the oldest surviving members of the National Football League; the Chicago Cardinals originally formed in 1898 and the Cleveland Rams were an expansion team that joined in 1936. Early on, both teams were pitted against each other in what was then the NFL Western division. Both clubs saw personnel struggles during World War II as neither team posted a winning season until 1944. The Rams and Cardinals would combine for 2 NFL Championships in 1945 and 1947 respectively, the latter being the most recent championship won by the Cardinals.

=== 1950s & 1960s ===
After 1950, matchups between the two teams were not regular again until the division realignment in 2002. Rams then-owner Dan Reeves previously relocated the team to Los Angeles following the 1946 season, and the Cardinals would shift to the American Conference from 1950–52, before encountering financial difficulties throughout the 1950s, ultimately leading them to relocate to St. Louis in 1960 as part of a bid from the league to prevent an AFL team from taking the St. Louis market. The Cardinals would begin to struggle mightily through the decades following their lone championship in 1947 and would not make a playoff appearance until 1974. Due to the shift in divisions and the reorganization following the merger with the AFL, the Rams and Cardinals only met 3 times between 1960 and 1968.

=== 1970s ===
The two franchises took very different paths during the 1970s. The Cardinals made back to back Divisional Round appearances in 1974 and 1975, while the Rams would make continuous postseason appearances from 1973 to 1979. These playoff appearances included a 1975 Divisional Round matchup against the Cardinals, the first postseason meeting between the two clubs. The Rams defense scored 2 touchdowns in the first half while running back Lawrence McCutcheon ran for an NFL playoff record 202 yards on 37 carries. Los Angeles started the game off with a 79-yard scoring drive. The Cardinals were extremely outmatched against the Rams defense as quarterback Jim Hart threw a critical interception that was returned for a pick-6. Hart would finish the game with 3 interceptions as the Rams were well beyond out of reach.

This would go onto be the Cardinals' last playoff appearance until 1982, and their last in a non-strike season until 1998, a decade after the franchise moved to Arizona. The two teams would meet again in the 1979 season, but the Rams dominated the game, shutting out the Cardinals 21–0.

The Rams were an aspiring playoff contender throughout the 1970s but would go onto lose in 4 straight Conference Championship games and lose an appearance in Super Bowl XIV.

=== 1980s ===
The Cardinals did not fare terribly well during the 1980s as the Rams would go onto boast a 6-game win streak in the series from 1979 to 1987. The Cardinals also would make their only playoff appearance of the decade during the 1982 postseason, but would fall to the Green Bay Packers. The Rams, meanwhile, were significantly competitive through the 1980s despite unstable ownership and a fight for the Los Angeles market with the Raiders relocating to LA in 1982. The Rams made 7 postseason appearances in the 1980s, but went on to lose twice in the conference championship to the 1985 Bears and the 1989 49ers. The Cardinals did not post a winning record from 1983 to 1998 and the club grew unsatisfied with the aging Busch Stadium, leading them to relocate to Phoenix, Arizona in 1988.

=== 1990s ===
The Rams sought relocation in 1995 following a sharp decline in fan attendance in addition to the team's play. Ironically, owner Georgia Frontiere relocated the team to St. Louis to fill the void left by the Cardinals 7 years earlier. The Cardinals struggled through most of the decade but somehow slipped into the playoffs in 1998 with a lowly 9–7 record, and pulled off a win over the Dallas Cowboys. However, they fell against the notorious 1998 Minnesota Vikings and their high-powered offense. The Rams pulled off an improbable turnaround the very next season: they finished 1998 with a weak 4–12 record, but turned their fortunes around during the 1999 season boasting a 13–3 record and winning Super Bowl XXXIV as the iconic Greatest Show On Turf led by Quarterback Kurt Warner.

=== 2000s ===
The new millennium fell in favor of the Rams briefly until they lost to the New England Patriots in Super Bowl XXXVI. The Cardinals were realigned back into the Rams' division following the 2002 NFL season where they remain today. The Rams remained competitive briefly but never regained the levels of playoff success they experienced at the beginning of the decade as they would not make a playoff appearance from 2005 to 2016. The Cardinals also turned their own fortunes around later in the decade following the hiring of Ken Whisenhunt in 2007, and reached a high point for the franchise the following season by winning the NFC West and making their first super bowl appearance in franchise history, but fell to the Pittsburgh Steelers. Ironically, the Cardinals revived their playoff ambitions with former Rams quarterback, Super Bowl winner and NFL MVP Kurt Warner. The Cardinals would only manage another wild card berth but would not return to the postseason until 2014; meanwhile, the Rams bottomed out with a terrible 1–15 record in 2009.

=== 2010s ===
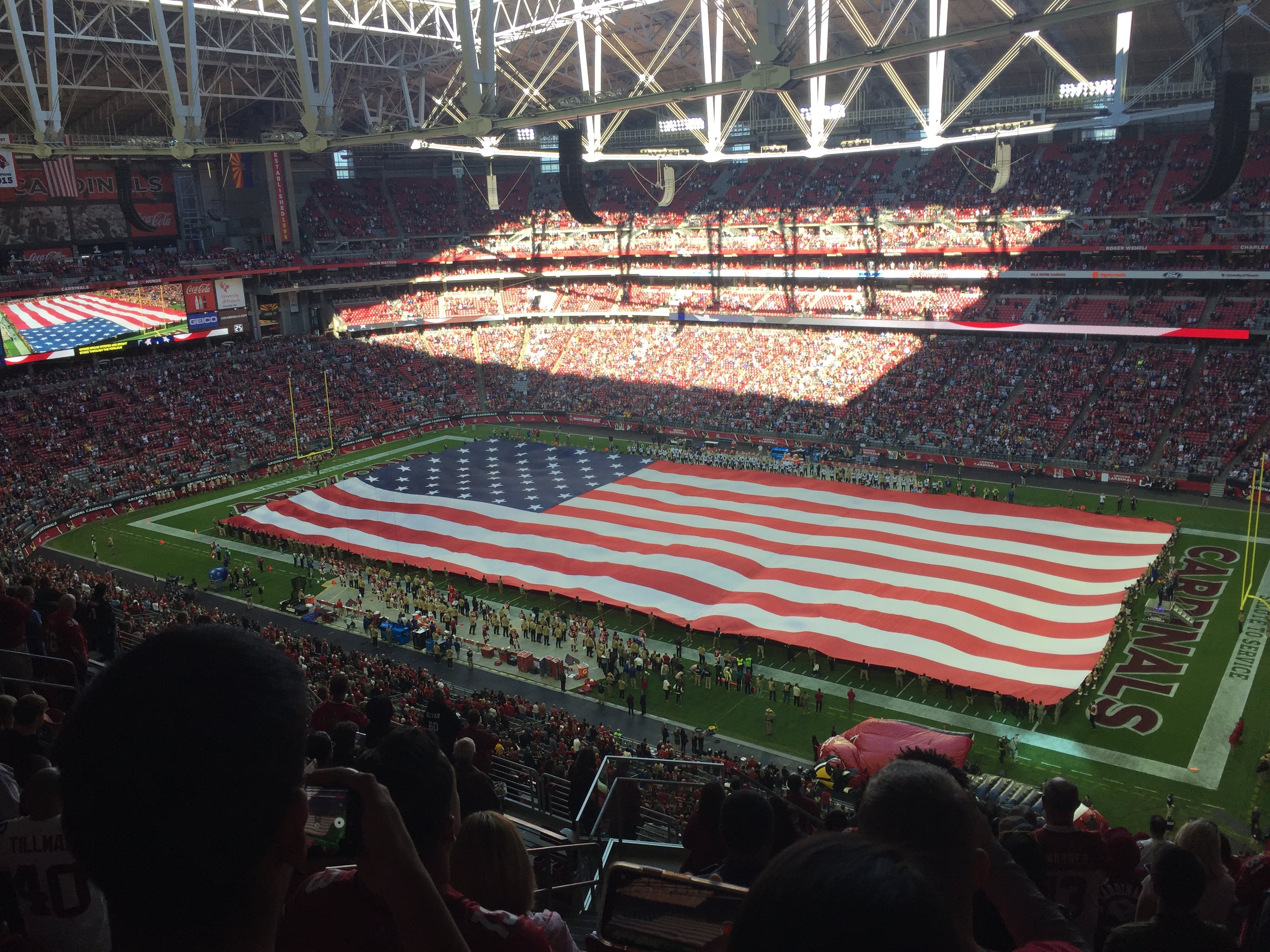
The Rams and Cardinals face off during a week 12 matchup in Glendale (final score 34–7), December 1, 2019

Both teams entered the decade rebuilding. The Rams attempted to turn their team around with coach Jeff Fisher but would not prosper much beyond mediocre 7–9 records in 2013 and 2015 respectively. The Cardinals found themselves thriving again as general manager Steve Keim and Head Coach Bruce Arians brought them to a 10–6 record his first two seasons with the team, and led them to a playoff berth in 2014. The Cardinals also traded for quarterback Carson Palmer and see a renaissance of their offense as they went 13–3 and managed a trip to the 2015 NFC Championship, where they fell to the Carolina Panthers. Following the 2015 season, the Rams would relocate back to Los Angeles and take quarterback Jared Goff first overall in that year's draft. The Rams would post a poor 4–12 record their first season back in Los Angeles, but would go on to make the postseason with an 11-5 record following the hire of new head coach Sean McVay. During this time, the Rams would also manage to shut out the Cardinals during a game at London's Twickenham Stadium, the first shut-out the team experienced since 1992. The Cardinals sputtered to a 8–8 record, after which Carson Palmer and Bruce Arians retired. The team brought in Steve Wilks as their coach, though his tenure was very short and he was fired following the 2018 season. From 2017, the Rams swept the Cardinals in four consecutive seasons. 2018 also saw the Rams make a return to the Super Bowl for the first time since 2001, though they again fell to the New England Patriots. The Cardinals hired Texas Tech head coach Kliff Kingsbury to replace Keim at the start of the 2019 season, after which they drafted quarterback Kyler Murray first overall. The Rams also hit a slump that season following their Super Bowl appearance, and finished 9–7, missing the postseason.

=== 2020s ===
The beginning of the decade saw strong play by of both teams yet again. The 2020 season saw the Cardinals breakout to a 6–3 record by week 9, one game ahead of the Rams who were 5–3 at their bye week. However they would only manage to win the remaining 4 of 7 games due to two upset losses to the 49ers and the then-winless New York Jets, the Rams lost control of the division followed by losing another critical rivalry matchup, (and ultimately the division lead) to the Seattle Seahawks. Arizona would fare even worse as they lost 5 of 7 games to finish the season tied for the lowest remaining wild card spot with the Chicago Bears. Both teams met during week 17 in Los Angeles for their regular season finale, notably the Rams had benched starting quarterback Jared Goff due to a thumb injury, and were forced to start backup quarterback John Wolford. Despite a 7–0 lead to finish the first quarter; the Rams would go onto humiliate the Cardinals, scoring 18 unanswered points in a crushing defeat. The loss ultimately gave the remaining wild card spot to the Bears; eliminating the Cardinals.

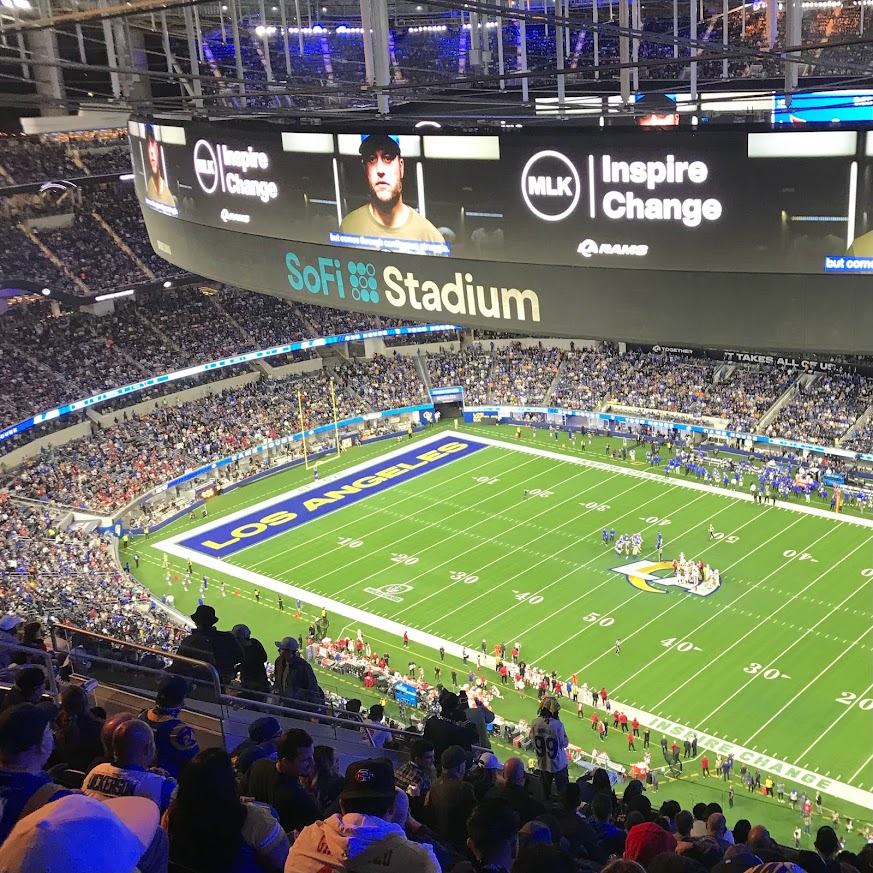
The Rams host the Cardinals for the NFC Wild Card Game on January 17, 2022

The 2021 season started with several drastic changes for the Rams as they traded Jared Goff and several draft picks to Detroit for quarterback Matthew Stafford. The Cardinals started the season 7–0, including a 37–20 win over the Rams in Los Angeles, ending their 8 game win streak over Arizona. The Rams entered the Monday Night matchup in Arizona with an 8–4 record as Arizona boasted a 10–2 record. However, the Rams won the return game in Glendale 30–23 in a hard-fought battle that saw Kyler Murray throw two interceptions, one critically turning the ball over in the fourth quarter, allowing the Rams to take the lead and eventually win. The Rams came back to win the division, while the Cardinals fell to a Wild Card spot, with the two facing off in the Wild Card round of the playoffs.

During the Wild Card game, the Cardinals were again quickly outgunned by the Rams as they were outscored 21–0 by halftime. During the third quarter, Rams running back Cam Akers unintentionally collided with Cardinals safety Budda Baker during a run. Akers was unaware Baker had suffered a concussion and was unable to get back up and playfully taunted him following the play. Following the arrival of medical personnel, Akers expressed his regret for the celebration and tweeted an apology for his taunt and expressed his support for Baker's recovery after the game. Despite Murray's best efforts during the second half, the Rams would go on to crush the Cardinals 34–11 in the Cardinals' first postseason appearance since 2015 and eventually win Super Bowl LVI.

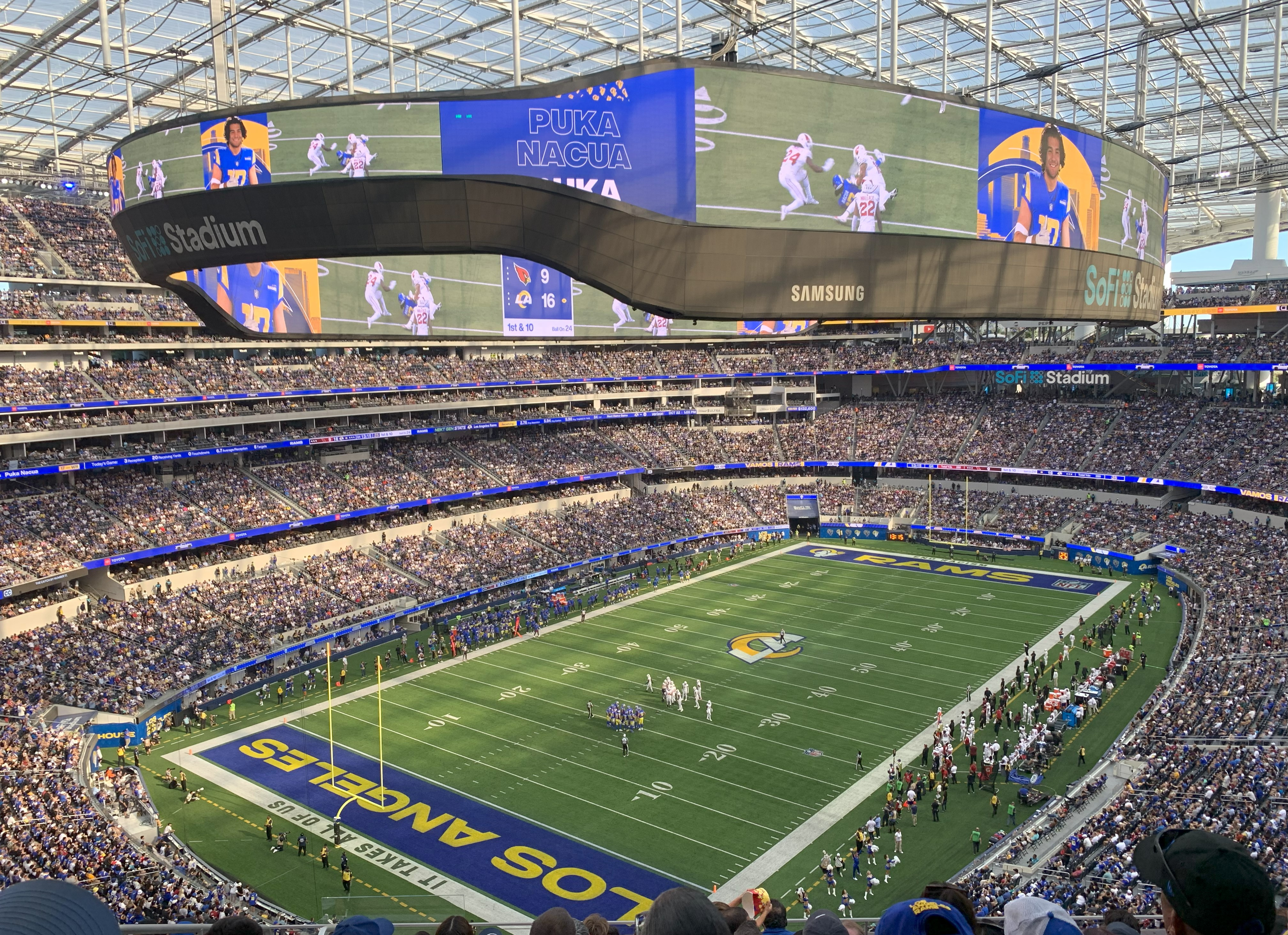
The Rams beat the Arizona Cardinals on October 15, 2023

The 2022 season proved to be tumultuous for the Rams as their Super Bowl winning roster was mostly ravaged by injuries; posting a meager 5–12 record in the process. They managed a victory against the Cardinals in Arizona, though collapsed the remainder of the season; losing the second matchup at home to Arizona, the second loss in Sean McVay's tenure to the Cardinals. The Cardinals managed a salvageable 4–6 record after beating the Rams, but went on to lose 7 straight matchups to finish the season 4–13. Adding to Arizona's struggles to repeat a postseason appearance; longtime general manager Steve Keim resigned from his position on January 16, 2023; head coach Kliff Kingsbury was later fired on February 14.

The 2023 season saw the Rams attempting to salvage a depleted roster as they struggled to stay above .500 following a tightly lost contest against both the rival 49ers and Eagles. The Cardinals dealt with their own struggles after quarterback Kyler Murray suffered an ACL tear against the New England Patriots during the 2022 season; sidelining him indefinitely. The Cardinals entered the week 6 matchup with a lowly 1–4 record despite an upset victory over the Dallas Cowboys. Despite an early showing from both defenses, Arizona managed to inch ahead as neither team were able to score a single touchdown in the first half as the Cardinals led 9–6. The second half saw the Rams obliterate the Cardinals as their rookie running back Kyren Williams scythed through Arizona's defense for 158 yards. Backup quarterback Josh Dobbs was unable to overcome the Rams' defense in the second half as he later threw a critical interception at the 24 yard line. The Rams went onto shut out the Cardinals for the second half of the game as they scored 20 unanswered points to secure the victory. The second meeting between the two teams in Glendale resulted in a Rams 37–14 blowout victory featuring four touchdown passes by Matthew Stafford. The Rams turned their season around after a 3–6 start, finishing with a 10–7 record and qualifying for the playoffs despite low expectations before the season, ultimately losing to the Detroit Lions in the Wild Card Round. The Cardinals finished with a 4–13 record, in line with the team's low expectations entering the season.

== Season–by–season results ==
Chicago/St. Louis/Arizona Cardinals vs. Cleveland/St. Louis/Los Angeles Rams Season-by-Season Results
1930s (Cardinals, 4–2)

Season	Season series	at Chicago Cardinals	at Cleveland Rams	Overall series	Notes
1937	Cardinals 2–0	Cardinals; 13–7	Cardinals; 6–0	Cardinals; 2–0	Rams join the National Football League (NFL) as an expansion team. They were placed in the NFL Western Division, resulting in two meetings annually with the Cardinals.
1938	Cardinals 2–0	Cardinals; 31–17	Cardinals; 7–6	Cardinals; 4–0	Cardinals' wins were their only wins in the 1938 season.
1939	Rams 2–0	Rams; 24–0	Rams; 14–0	Cardinals; 4–2	

1940s (Cardinals, 8–7–1)

Season	Season series	at Chicago Cardinals	at Cleveland/Los Angeles Rams	Overall series	Notes
1940	Tie 1–1	Cardinals; 17–7	Rams; 26–14	Cardinals; 5–3	
1941	Tie 1–1	Rams; 10–6	Cardinals; 7–0	Cardinals; 6–4	Rams' win was their last of the 1941 season, as they ended the season on a nine-game losing streak.
1942	Tie 1–1	Cardinals; 7–0	Rams; 7–3	Cardinals; 7–5	Beginning with their loss to the Rams, the Cardinals went on a 29-game losing streak — the longest in NFL history.
1945	Rams 2–0	Rams; 35–21	Rams; 21–0	Tied; 7–7	The Rams suspended operations in the 1943 season due to World War II. Cardinals and the Pittsburgh Steelers temporarily merged during the 1944 season due to a shortage of numerous players due to World War II military service, nicknamed Card-Pitt. Final season the Rams played as a Cleveland-based team. Rams win 1945 NFL Championship Game.
1946	Tie 1–1	Cardinals; 34–10	Rams; 17–14	Tied; 8–8	The Rams relocate to Los Angeles. First meeting in Los Angeles Memorial Coliseum.
1947	Tie 1–1	Cardinals; 17–10	Rams; 27–7	Tied; 9–9	Cardinals win 1947 NFL Championship Game, their most recent championship as of November 16, 2026, setting a record for the longest championship drought in American professional sports.
1948	Cardinals 2–0	Cardinals; 27–24	Cardinals; 27–22	Cardinals; 11–9	
1949	Cardinals 1–0–1	Tie; 28–28	Cardinals; 31–27	Cardinals; 12–9–1	In Los Angeles, Cardinals overcame a 24–3 second-half deficit. Last season until the 2002 season the Cardinals and Rams were in the same division. As a result of the AAFC–NFL merger the following season, the Cardinals were placed in the NFL American Conference while the Rams were placed in the NFL National Conference (both would be renamed to the NFL Eastern Conference and the NFL Western Conference respectively in the 1953 season.)

1950s (Rams, 3–0–1)

Season	Results	Location	Overall series	Notes
1951	Rams; 45–21	Los Angeles Memorial Coliseum	Cardinals; 12–10–1	Rams win 1951 NFL Championship Game.
1953	Tie; 24–24	Comiskey Park	Cardinals; 12–10–2	
1954	Rams; 28–17	Los Angeles Memorial Coliseum	Cardinals; 12–11–2	
1958	Rams; 20–14	Comiskey Park	Tied; 12–12–2	Final game Rams faced the Cardinals as a Chicago-based team and in Chicago.

1960s (Rams, 2–1)

Season	Results	Location	Overall series	Notes
1960	Cardinals; 43–21	Los Angeles Memorial Coliseum	Cardinals; 13–12–2	The Cardinals relocate to St. Louis, with their game against the Rams being their inaugural game as a St. Louis-based franchise.
1965	Rams; 27–3	Sportsman's Park	Tied; 13–13–2	The first head-to-head meeting between the Rams and Cardinals in St. Louis, and the first and only meeting was in Sportsman's Park.
1968	Rams; 24–13	Civic Center Busch Memorial Stadium	Rams; 14–13–2	First meeting in Busch Stadium. Rams take their first lead in the overall series record.

1970s (Rams, 3–2)

Season	Results	Location	Overall series	Notes
1970	Rams; 34–13	Los Angeles Memorial Coliseum	Rams; 15–13–2	As a result of the AFL-NFL merger, the Cardinals were placed in the NFC East while the Rams were placed in the NFC West. First regular season game following the AFL-NFL merger.
1972	Cardinals; 24–14	Civic Center Busch Memorial Stadium	Rams; 15–14–2	
1975 Playoffs	Rams; 35–23	Los Angeles Memorial Coliseum	Rams; 16–14–2	NFC Divisional.
1976	Cardinals; 30–28	Los Angeles Memorial Coliseum	Rams; 16–15–2	Cardinals overcame a 21–6 second-half deficit.
1979	Rams; 21–0	Los Angeles Memorial Coliseum	Rams; 17–15–2	Final meeting at Los Angeles Memorial Coliseum until the 2016 season, as the Rams moved to Angel Stadium the following season. Rams lose Super Bowl XIV.

1980s (Rams, 6–1)

Season	Results	Location	Overall series	Notes
1980	Rams; 21–13	Civic Center Busch Memorial Stadium	Rams; 18–15–2	
1984	Rams; 16–13	Busch Stadium	Rams; 19–15–2	
1985	Rams; 46–14	Anaheim Stadium	Rams; 20–15–2	First meeting in Anaheim Stadium. Rams score their most points in a game against the Cardinals.
1986	Rams; 16–10	Busch Stadium	Rams; 21–15–2	
1987	Rams; 27–24	Busch Stadium	Rams; 22–15–2	Last season Cardinals played as a St. Louis-based team.
1988	Cardinals; 41–27	Anaheim Stadium	Rams; 22–16–2	Cardinals relocate to Phoenix, Arizona.
1989	Rams; 37–14	Anaheim Stadium	Rams; 23–16–2	

1990s (Cardinals, 5–1)

Season	Results	Location	Overall series	Notes
1991	Cardinals; 24–14	Anaheim Stadium	Rams; 23–17–2	
1992	Cardinals; 20–14	Anaheim Stadium	Rams; 23–18–2	
1993	Cardinals; 38–10	Sun Devil Stadium	Rams; 23–19–2	First meeting in Phoenix, Arizona and in Sun Devil Stadium.
1994	Rams; 14–12	Anaheim Stadium	Rams; 24–19–2	Phoenix Cardinals rename themselves to the Arizona Cardinals. Final season until the 2016 season the Rams played as a Los Angeles-based team, as they relocated to St. Louis the following season. Final meeting in Anaheim Stadium.
1996	Cardinals; 31–28 (OT)	Sun Devil Stadium	Rams; 24–20–2	Cardinals overcame a 28–14 fourth-quarter deficit. First overtime result in the series.
1998	Cardinals; 20–17	Trans World Dome	Rams; 24–21–2	First meeting in Trans World Dome (now known as The Dome at America's Center).

2000s (Cardinals, 9–7)

Season	Season series	at Arizona Cardinals	at St. Louis Rams	Overall series	Notes
2002	Rams 2–0	Rams; 27–14	Rams; 30–28	Rams; 26–21–2	During the NFL realignment, the Cardinals were moved to the NFC West, once again resulting in two meetings annually with the Rams since the 1949 NFL season.
2003	Rams 2–0	Rams; 30–27 (OT)	Rams; 37–13	Rams; 28–21–2	
2004	Tie 1–1	Cardinals; 31–7	Rams; 17–10	Rams; 29–22–2	
2005	Tie 1–1	Rams; 17–12	Cardinals; 38–28	Rams; 30–23–2	Cardinals sign former Rams Quarterback and Super Bowl XXXIV MVP Kurt Warner.
2006	Tie 1–1	Rams; 16–14	Cardinals; 34–20	Rams; 31–24–2	
2007	Cardinals 2–0	Cardinals; 48–19	Cardinals; 34–31	Rams; 31–26–2	In Arizona, the Cardinals score their most points in a game against the Rams.
2008	Cardinals 2–0	Cardinals; 34–10	Cardinals; 34–13	Rams; 31–28–2	The Cardinals win all of their division games for the first time in franchise history. Cardinals lose Super Bowl XLIII.
2009	Cardinals 2–0	Cardinals; 31–10	Cardinals; 21–13	Rams; 31–30–2	

2010s (Rams, 12–8)

Season	Season series	at Arizona Cardinals	at St. Louis/Los Angeles Rams	Overall series	Notes
2010	Tie 1–1	Rams; 19–6	Cardinals; 17–13	Rams; 32–31–2	
2011	Cardinals 2–0	Cardinals; 19–13 (OT)	Cardinals; 23–20	Cardinals; 33–32–2	
2012	Rams 2–0	Rams; 31–17	Rams; 17–3	Rams; 34–33–2	
2013	Tie 1–1	Cardinals; 30–10	Rams; 27–24	Rams; 35–34–2	In St. Louis, Rams overcame a 24–13 fourth-quarter deficit.
2014	Cardinals 2–0	Cardinals; 31–14	Cardinals; 12–6	Cardinals; 36–35–2	As of November 16, 2026, this remains the Cardinals' most recent season series sweep against the Rams.
2015	Tie 1–1	Rams; 24–22	Cardinals; 27–3	Cardinals; 37–36–2	Last season, the Rams played as a St. Louis-based team, and last season, both previously St. Louis-based teams played in St. Louis.
2016	Tie 1–1	Rams; 17–13	Cardinals; 44–6	Cardinals; 38–37–2	Rams relocate back to Los Angeles. In Los Angeles, Cardinals record their largest victory against the Rams with a 38–point differential.
2017	Rams 2–0	Rams; 32–16	Rams; 33–0	Rams; 39–38–2	Rams' home game is played at Twickenham Stadium in Twickenham, London, as part of the NFL International Series.
2018	Rams 2–0	Rams; 31–9	Rams; 34–0	Rams; 41–38–2	In Los Angeles, Rams record their largest victory against the Cardinals with a 34–point differential. Rams lose Super Bowl LIII.
2019	Rams 2–0	Rams; 34–7	Rams; 31–24	Rams; 43–38–2	Cardinals draft Kyler Murray.

2020s (Rams, 11–4)

Season	Season series	at Arizona Cardinals	at Los Angeles Rams	Overall series	Notes
2020	Rams 2–0	Rams; 38–28	Rams; 18–7	Rams; 45–38–2	Rams open SoFi Stadium. In Los Angeles, Rams clinched a playoff berth and eliminated the Cardinals from playoff contention with their win. Rams won eight straight meetings (2017–2020).
2021	Tie 1–1	Rams; 30–23	Cardinals; 37–20	Rams; 46–39–2	Rams trade QB Jared Goff for Lions' quarterback Matthew Stafford.
2021 Playoffs	Rams 1–0	—N/a	Rams; 34–11	Rams; 47–39–2	NFC Wild Card. First career playoff win for quarterback Matthew Stafford. Rams go on to win Super Bowl LVI.
2022	Tie 1–1	Rams; 20–12	Cardinals; 27–17	Rams; 48–40–2	
2023	Rams 2–0	Rams; 37–14	Rams; 26–9	Rams; 50–40–2	Rams won 9 straight road meetings (2015–2023).
2024	Tie 1–1	Cardinals; 41–10	Rams; 13–9	Rams; 51–41–2	Rams clinched the NFC West title with their win and victories by the Bengals, Bills, Vikings, and Commanders to win strength of victory tiebreaker over Seahawks. Due to wildfires in southern California, the Rams' Wild Card home game against the Vikings was played at State Farm Stadium.
2025	Rams 2–0	Rams; 45–17	Rams; 37–20	Rams; 53–41–2	
2026	Tie 1–1	Rams; 34–6	Cardinals; 18–16	Rams; 54–42–2	

Summary of Results

Season	Season series	at Chicago/St. Louis/Arizona Cardinals	at Cleveland/St. Louis/Los Angeles Rams	Notes
Regular season	Rams 52–42–2	Rams 27–18–2	Rams 25–24	Rams are 1–0 at Twickenham Stadium in Twickenham, London (2017), accounted for as a Los Angeles Rams home game.
Postseason	Rams 2–0	no games	Rams 2–0	NFC Wild Card: 2021; NFC Divisional: 1975
Regular and postseason	Rams 54–42–2	Rams 27–18–2	Rams 27–24	At Cardinals' home games: Cardinals have a 7–4–2 record in Chicago, while the Rams have a 6–1 record in St. Louis and currently has a 17–10 record in Phoenix, Arizona. At Rams' home games: Cardinals have a 10–5 record in St. Louis, while the Rams have a 4–3 record in Cleveland and currently have a 17–11 record in Los Angeles.

== See also ==
- National Football League rivalries
- NFC West
- Diamondbacks–Dodgers rivalry
- Lakers–Suns rivalry
- Governor's Cup (Missouri)
