= Governor's Cup (Missouri) =

Former National Football League cross-state rivalry and trophy in Missouri

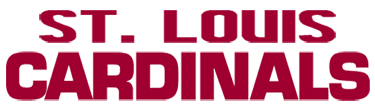
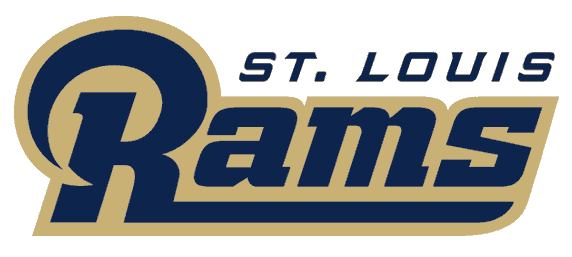
- Kansas City Chiefs St. Louis Cardinals (NFL) (NFL) St. Louis Rams
- First meeting: November 22, 1970; Cardinals 6, Chiefs 6
- Latest meeting: September 3, 2015; Chiefs 24, Rams 17
- Next meeting: (Defunct)

Statistics
- Total meetings: 11
- All-time series: Chiefs lead Cardinals, 3–1–1; Chiefs lead Rams, 6–0–0
- Largest victory: Chiefs (over Cardinals): 38–14 (October 2, 1983); Chiefs (over Rams): 49–10 (December 8, 2002); Cardinals (over Chiefs): 23–14 (November 23, 1986)
- Current win streak: Chiefs: 6 wins (1997–2014)

The Missouri Governor's Cup (also known as the Chiefs–Rams rivalry, or Cardinals–Chiefs rivalry) was a trophy awarded to the winner of the football game between Missouri's two National Football League (NFL) teams. The local press occasionally referred to the game as The Battle of Missouri, The Show-Me State Showdown, or the I-70 Series. Originally played for between the Kansas City Chiefs and the St. Louis Cardinals, the series went into recess after 1987 following the Cardinals' relocation to Phoenix, Arizona at the end of the season, leaving the Chiefs as the only NFL team in Missouri. In 1996, the year after the St. Louis Rams relocated from Los Angeles, the Governor's Cup series returned and was played until 2015 in the preseason and the interconference regular season matchups between the Chiefs and Rams. The series ended once again after the Rams returned to Los Angeles in 2016, leaving the Chiefs as the only NFL team in Missouri for a second time.

== History ==
=== 1968–1987: Cardinals and Chiefs ===
The contest began in 1968 when St. Louis was home of the St. Louis football Cardinals until the Cardinals' relocation in 1988. The Governor's Cup game was resumed in the 1996 season between the Chiefs and the Rams until the Rams' relocation in 2016.

The Chiefs posted a 16–7–2 mark in its Governor's Cup series against the Cardinals from 1968 to 1987, going 3–1–1 in the regular season record and 13–6–1 in preseason play.

=== 1996–2015: Chiefs and Rams ===
When the Los Angeles Rams relocated to St. Louis, the rivalry among Missourians re-emerged. Both the Rams and the Chiefs possessed the two most productive offenses in the NFL in the early 2000s, and the meetings often resulted in shootouts. Former Rams coach Dick Vermeil was hired by the Chiefs in 2001 after he had won Super Bowl XXXIV with the Rams with one of the NFL's most powerful offensive squads in history. Once the Chiefs created their own high-powered offense with the arrival of Vermeil, the rivalry became even more exciting. In often meaningless preseason games, the Chiefs and Rams gave all their energy to secure the Governor's Cup, their spot as the best offense in the league, and bragging rights for their respective city in Missouri. Dick Vermeil faced off against his old coaching staff with the Rams – including his offensive coordinator of "The Greatest Show on Turf", Mike Martz, who succeeded Vermeil for the Rams head coaching job.

=== Rams return to Los Angeles ===
Chiefs owner Clark Hunt helped engineer the Rams' return to Los Angeles, their home from 1946–94, in January 2016, when he was the sole dissenting vote for a proposal which would have allowed the Raiders and Chargers to move to a new stadium in Carson. Hunt and Cowboys owner Jerry Jones then brokered a deal to allow the Rams to move back to California, where owner Stan Kroenke would construct a new stadium in Inglewood. The substitute proposal was approved 30–2, with the Raiders and Chargers voting no. The Chargers moved to Los Angeles in 2017, then became tenants of the Rams' stadium in 2020.

== Regular season results ==
=== Chiefs vs. Cardinals ===
Kansas City Chiefs vs. St. Louis Cardinals Season-by-Season Results
1970s (Chiefs, 1–0–1)

Season	Results	Location	Overall series	Notes
1970	Tie; 6–6	Municipal Stadium	Tie; 0–0–1	First regular season meeting.
1974	Chiefs; 10–0	Busch Memorial Stadium	Chiefs; 1–0–1	

1980s (Chiefs, 2–1)

Season	Results	Location	Overall series	Notes
1980	Chiefs; 21–13	Busch Memorial Stadium	Chiefs; 2–0–1	
1983	Chiefs; 38–14	Arrowhead Stadium	Chiefs; 3–0–1	
1986	Cardinals; 23–14	Busch Memorial Stadium	Chiefs; 3–1–1	Last regular season Chiefs-Cardinals all-Missouri meeting.

Summary of Results

Season	Season series	at Kansas City Chiefs	at St. Louis Cardinals	Notes
Regular season	Chiefs 3–1–1	Chiefs 1–0–1	Chiefs 2–1	

=== Chiefs vs. Rams ===
Kansas City Chiefs vs. St. Louis Rams Season-by-Season Results
1990s (Chiefs, 1–0)

Season	Results	Location	Overall series	Notes
1997	Chiefs; 28–20	Trans World Dome	Chiefs; 1–0	First regular season Chiefs-Rams all-Missouri meeting.

2000s (Chiefs, 3–0)

Season	Results	Location	Overall series	Notes
2000	Chiefs; 54–34	Arrowhead Stadium	Chiefs; 2–0	
2002	Chiefs; 49–10	Arrowhead Stadium	Chiefs; 3–0	
2006	Chiefs; 31–17	Edward Jones Dome	Chiefs; 4–0	

2010s (Chiefs, 2–0)

Season	Results	Location	Overall series	Notes
2010	Chiefs; 27–13	Edward Jones Dome	Chiefs; 5–0	
2014	Chiefs; 34–7	Arrowhead Stadium	Chiefs; 6–0	Last regular season Chiefs-Rams all-Missouri meeting.

Summary of Results

Season	Season series	at Kansas City Chiefs	at St. Louis Rams	Notes
Regular season	Chiefs 6–0	Chiefs 3–0	Chiefs 3–0	

== See also ==
- 2018 Kansas City Chiefs–Los Angeles Rams game
- Battle of Ohio (NFL)
- I-70 Series
- Governor's Cup (Texas)
- Cardinals–Rams rivalry
- Bears–Cardinals rivalry
