= Clinton Wheeler =

American basketball player (1959–2019)

Personal information
- Born: October 27, 1959 Neptune Township, New Jersey, U.S.
- Died: February 14, 2019 (aged 59) Middletown, New Jersey, U.S.
- Listed height: 6 ft 1 in (1.85 m)
- Listed weight: 185 lb (84 kg)

Career information
- High school: Long Branch (Long Branch, New Jersey)
- College: William Paterson (1977–1981)
- NBA draft: 1981: 7th round, 150th overall pick
- Drafted by: Kansas City Kings
- Playing career: 1984–1995
- Position: Point guard
- Number: 5, 10, 11

Career history
- 1984–1985: Albany Patroons
- 1985: Jersey Jammers
- 1985–1986: Albany Patroons
- 1986–1987: Tampa Bay Thrillers
- 1987: Miami Tropics
- 1987–1988: Indiana Pacers
- 1988: Rapid City Thrillers
- 1988: Miami Heat
- 1989: Portland Trail Blazers
- 1989–1993: Bayer Giants Leverkusen
- 1993–1994: Rochester Renegade
- 1994: Jacksonville Hooters
- 1994–1995: Rapid City Thrillers

Career highlights
- CBA champion (1987); CBA Playoff/Finals MVP (1987); 2× All-CBA First Team (1985, 1989); 4× CBA All-Defensive First Team (1985–1987, 1989); CBA steals leader (1986)
- Stats at NBA.com
- Stats at Basketball Reference

Clinton Wheeler (October 27, 1959 – February 14, 2019) was an American professional basketball player. He was a 6-foot-1-inch (185 cm) 185 pounds (84 kg) point guard and played collegiately at Division III's William Paterson University. In his brief NBA career from 1987 to 1989, he played for three teams.

== Life ==
Wheeler played high school basketball at Long Branch High School in Long Branch, New Jersey.

A product of the William Paterson University program where he played four years, Wheeler scored 1,624 points for WP, which put him in third position on the school's all-time list, when he left college in 1981. In the 1979–80 season, he averaged 26.1 points a contest and 22.4 points a game in 1980–81.

During the 1980s, Wheeler played frequently in the Jersey Shore Basketball League which was a Pro-Am league that played outdoors at the Headliner in Neptune, NJ. NBA players and NJ residents like Kelly Tripucka, Roy Hinson, and Mike O'Koren also played. Wheeler's plays could be highlighted by the PA announcer stating, "Wow Wheeler!" after a basket.

Wheeler was selected by the Kansas City Kings in the 7th round (12th pick) of the 1981 NBA draft. Wheeler played in the Continental Basketball Association for the Albany Patroons and the Tampa Bay / Rapid City Thrillers from 1984 to 1989. He won a CBA championship with the Thrillers in 1987. He was selected as the CBA Playoff/Finals Most Valuable Player in 1987, and named to the All-CBA First Team in 1986 and 1989 and All-Defensive First Team in 1985, 1986, 1987 and 1989. He is ranked eighth on the Albany Patroons' all-time regular season scoring list. From 1989 to 1993, he played for Bayer Leverkusen in Germany's top flight Basketball Bundesliga, where he was a teammate with fellow American Kannard Johnson. Wheeler won four German national championship titles with Leverkusen.

He died February 14, 2019, at age 59.

== Career statistics ==
Legend
GP	Games played	GS	Games started	MPG	Minutes per game
FG%	Field goal percentage	3P%	3-point field goal percentage	FT%	Free throw percentage
RPG	Rebounds per game	APG	Assists per game	SPG	Steals per game
BPG	Blocks per game	PPG	Points per game	**Bold**	Career high

=== NBA ===
==== Regular season ====
Year	Team	GP	GS	MPG	FG%	3P%	FT%	RPG	APG	SPG	BPG	PPG
1987–88	Indiana	**59**	0	8.7	.470	–	.735	.7	1.7	.6	.0	2.5
1988–89	Miami	8	0	**17.9**	**.571**	.000	**.800**	**1.5**	**2.6**	**1.0**	.0	**7.0**
1988–89	Portland	20	0	10.6	.467	.000	.700	1.0	1.7	**1.0**	.0	2.5
Career		87	0	10.0	.489	.000	.741	.8	1.8	.7	.0	2.9
