= 1987–88 Detroit Pistons season =

- Conference champions
- Division champions
- Head coach: Chuck Daly
- General manager: Jack McCloskey
- Owner: William Davidson
- Arena: Pontiac Silverdome

Results
- Record: 54–28 (.659)
- Place: Division: 1st (Central); Conference: 2nd (Eastern)
- Playoff finish: NBA Finals (lost to Lakers 3–4)
- Stats at Basketball Reference

Local media
- Television: PASS Sports (Fred McLeod, Tom Wilson); WKBD (George Blaha, Hubie Brown, Greg Kelser, Dick Motta)
- Radio: WWJ–AM (George Blaha, Hubie Brown, Greg Kelser, Dick Motta)

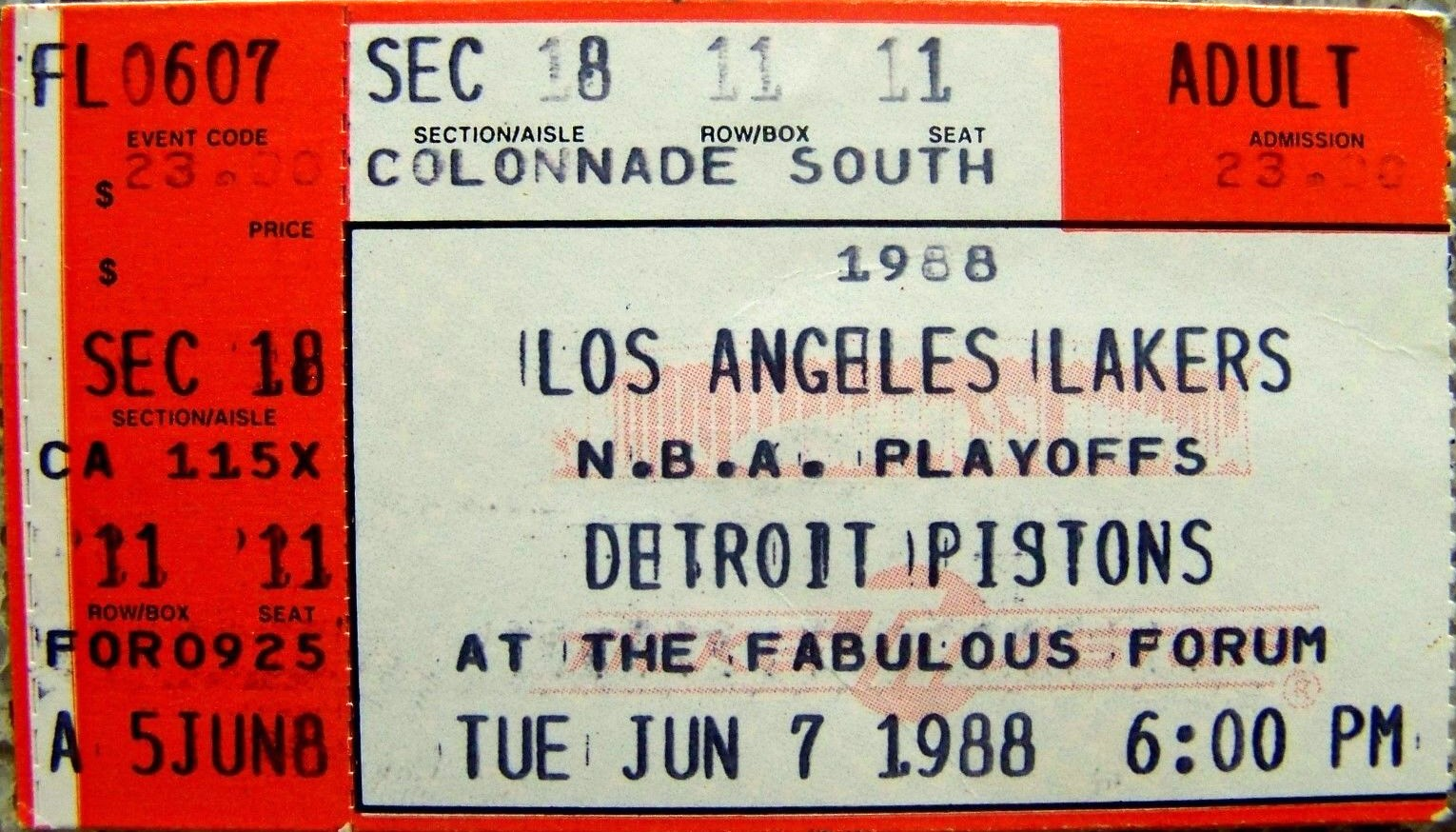
A ticket for Game 1 of the 1988 NBA Finals at The Forum.

The 1987–88 Detroit Pistons season was the 40th season for the Detroit Pistons in the National Basketball Association, and their 31st season in Detroit, Michigan. This was also the team's final season in which they played their home games at the Pontiac Silverdome in suburban Pontiac, Michigan.

== Season summary ==
=== Regular season ===
After a 7–5 start to the regular season, the Pistons posted a 10-game winning streak in December, and later on held a 25–16 record at the All-Star break. At mid-season, the team acquired James Edwards from the Phoenix Suns. The Pistons posted a seven-game winning streak in March, finished in first place in the Central Division with a 54–28 record, and earned the second seed in the Eastern Conference; it was the first Division title for the franchise since moving to Detroit in 1957, as the team qualified for the NBA playoffs for the fifth consecutive year.

Adrian Dantley led the Pistons in scoring with 20.0 points per game, while Isiah Thomas averaged 19.5 points, 8.4 assists and 1.7 steals per game, and Joe Dumars provided the team with 14.2 points and 4.7 assists per game. In addition, Bill Laimbeer averaged 13.5 points and 10.1 rebounds per game, while Vinnie Johnson contributed 12.2 points and 3.3 assists per game, and second-year forward Dennis Rodman provided with 11.6 points and 8.7 rebounds per game. Meanwhile, Rick Mahorn averaged 10.7 points and 8.4 rebounds per game, and second-year center John Salley contributed 8.5 points, 4.9 rebounds and 1.7 blocks per game.

During the NBA All-Star weekend at the Chicago Stadium in Chicago, Illinois, Thomas was selected for the 1988 NBA All-Star Game, as a member of the Eastern Conference All-Star team. Thomas, a native of Chicago, dished out 15 assists as the Eastern Conference defeated the Western Conference, 138–133. Thomas also finished in twelfth place in Most Valuable Player voting, while Dantley finished tied in 14th place, and Rodman finished tied in eighth place in Defensive Player of the Year voting.

The Pistons led the NBA in home-game attendance, with an attendance of 1,066,505 at the Pontiac Silverdome during the regular season.

=== NBA playoffs ===
In the Eastern Conference First Round of the 1988 NBA playoffs, the Pistons faced off against the 7th–seeded Washington Bullets, a team that featured All-Star center Moses Malone, All-Star guard Jeff Malone, and Bernard King. The Pistons won the first two games over the Bullets at home at the Pontiac Silverdome, before losing the next two games on the road, which included a Game 4 loss to the Bullets at the Capital Centre, 106–103. With the series tied at 2–2, the Pistons won Game 5 over the Bullets at the Pontiac Silverdome, 99–78 to win in a hard-fought five-game series.

In the Eastern Conference Semi-finals, the team faced off against the 3rd–seeded Chicago Bulls, who were led by All-Star guard, Most Valuable Player, and Defensive Player of the Year, Michael Jordan, Charles Oakley and Sam Vincent. The Pistons won Game 1 over the Bulls at the Pontiac Silverdome, 93–82, but then lost Game 2 at home by a score of 105–95, as the Bulls evened the series. The Pistons managed to win the next two games on the road at the Chicago Stadium, before winning Game 5 over the Bulls at the Pontiac Silverdome, 102–95 to win the series in five games.

In the Eastern Conference Finals, and for the second consecutive year, the Pistons faced off against the top–seeded, and Atlantic Division champion Boston Celtics, who were led by the All-Star quartet of Larry Bird, Kevin McHale, Robert Parish and Danny Ainge. The Pistons took a 2–1 series lead before losing Game 4 to the Celtics at the Pontiac Silverdome, 79–78, as the Celtics evened the series; the Pistons struggled only shooting .333 in field-goal percentage in Game 4. The Pistons managed to win Game 5 over the Celtics on the road in overtime, 102–96 at the Boston Garden, before winning Game 6 at the Pontiac Silverdome, 95–90 to win the series in six games, and advance to the NBA Finals for the first time since 1956, when the team was based in Fort Wayne, Indiana.

In the 1988 NBA Finals, the Pistons faced off against the top–seeded, and defending NBA champion Los Angeles Lakers, who were led by the quartet of All-Star guard Magic Johnson, All-Star forward James Worthy, Byron Scott and All-Star center Kareem Abdul-Jabbar. The Pistons won Game 1 over the Lakers on the road, 105–93 at the Great Western Forum, but then lost the next two games as the Lakers took a 2–1 series lead. The Pistons managed to win the next two games, including a Game 5 home win over the Lakers at the Pontiac Silverdome, 104–94 to take a 3–2 series lead.

However, in Game 6 at the Great Western Forum, Thomas suffered a gruesome ankle injury; on the sidelines, camera shots displayed the critical condition of Thomas's foot, as he could barely fit his shoe back on, but he insisted on playing. Hobbling badly for the rest of the game, Thomas put on a show, scoring 25 points in the third quarter, and 43 points in the game. In the closing seconds, and with the Pistons ahead, there was a controversial call on Laimbeer. Abdul-Jabbar feinted over his right shoulder to the middle, then pivoted to his left for his classic sky hook along the baseline; Laimbeer raised his hands straight above his head to show he was not fouling, and yet was called for what Lakers head coach Pat Riley would call a "phantom foul". The Pistons lost to the Lakers, 103–102 as Abdul-Jabbar made both free throws to even the series. In Game 7 at the Great Western Forum, and with a very limited Thomas, the Pistons lost to the Lakers, 108–105, thus losing in a hard-fought seven-game series, as the Lakers won their second consecutive NBA championship.

=== Aftermath ===
Game 5 of the NBA Finals was the franchise's last game at the Pontiac Silverdome, as the Pistons would move to another Detroit-area suburban arena, the purpose-built arena known as The Palace of Auburn Hills, the following season.

== Roster ==
1987–88 Detroit Pistons roster
Players

Pos.	No.	Player	Height	Weight	DOB	From
C	25	William Bedford	7 ft 0 in (2.13 m)	225 lb (102 kg)		Memphis
SF	45	Adrian Dantley	6 ft 5 in (1.96 m)	208 lb (94 kg)		Notre Dame
C	50	Darryl Dawkins	6 ft 11 in (2.11 m)	251 lb (114 kg)		Maynard Evans High School
SG	4	Joe Dumars	6 ft 3 in (1.91 m)	190 lb (86 kg)		McNeese State
F/C	53	James Edwards	7 ft 1 in (2.16 m)	225 lb (102 kg)		Washington
SG	15	Vinnie Johnson	6 ft 2 in (1.88 m)	200 lb (91 kg)		Baylor
C	40	Bill Laimbeer	6 ft 11 in (2.11 m)	245 lb (111 kg)		Notre Dame
SG	35	Ralph Lewis	6 ft 6 in (1.98 m)	200 lb (91 kg)		La Salle
F/C	44	Rick Mahorn	6 ft 10 in (2.08 m)	240 lb (109 kg)		Hampton
C	54	Ron Moore	7 ft 0 in (2.13 m)	195 lb (88 kg)		West Virginia State
C	42	Chuck Nevitt	7 ft 5 in (2.26 m)	217 lb (98 kg)		NC State
F	10	Dennis Rodman	6 ft 7 in (2.01 m)	220 lb (100 kg)		SE Oklahoma State
SG	23	Walker Russell	6 ft 5 in (1.96 m)	195 lb (88 kg)		Western Michigan
F/C	22	John Salley	6 ft 11 in (2.11 m)	230 lb (104 kg)		Georgia Tech
PG	11	Isiah Thomas	6 ft 1 in (1.85 m)	180 lb (82 kg)		Indiana

Coaches
Head coach
- Chuck Daly
Assistant(s)
- Ron Rothstein
- Dick Versace

Legend
- (DP) Unsigned draft pick
- (FA) Free agent
- (S) Suspended
- Injured

== Regular season ==
=== Season standings ===
Central Division	W	L	PCT	GB	Home	Road	Div
y-Detroit Pistons	54	28	.659	–	34–7	20–21	20–10
x-Chicago Bulls	50	32	.610	4	30–11	20–21	16–13
x-Atlanta Hawks	50	32	.610	4	30-11	20-21	16–13
x-Milwaukee Bucks	42	40	.512	12	30–11	12–29	13–17
x-Cleveland Cavaliers	42	40	.512	12	31–10	11–30	11–19
Indiana Pacers	38	44	.463	16	25–16	13–28	13–17

#	Eastern Conference				
#	Team	W	L	PCT	GB
1	c-Boston Celtics	57	25	.695	–
2	y-Detroit Pistons	54	28	.659	3
3	x-Chicago Bulls	50	32	.610	7
4	x-Atlanta Hawks	50	32	.610	7
5	x-Milwaukee Bucks	42	40	.512	15
6	x-Cleveland Cavaliers	42	40	.512	15
7	x-Washington Bullets	38	44	.463	19
8	x-New York Knicks	38	44	.463	19
9	Indiana Pacers	38	44	.463	19
10	Philadelphia 76ers	36	46	.439	21
11	New Jersey Nets	19	63	.232	38

=== Record vs. opponents ===
==== vs. Eastern Conference ====
vs. Atlantic Division

1987–88 NBA records
Team	BOS	NJN	NYK	PHI	WSB	Total
Atlanta	2–4	5–0	3–3	6–0	3–3	19–10
Chicago	3–3	5–1	3–2	4–2	3–3	18–11
Cleveland	3–2	5–1	2–4	3–2	6–0	19–9
Detroit	3–3	5–1	4–2	4–1	3–2	19–9
Indiana	0–5	6–0	2–3	2–4	2–4	12–16
Milwaukee	3–3	3–2	3–3	2–4	4–1	15–13

vs. Central Division

1987–88 NBA records
Team	ATL	CHI	CLE	DET	IND	MIL	Total
Atlanta	—	2–3	5–1	2–4	3–3	4–2	16–13
Chicago	3–2	—	3–3	2–4	3–3	5–1	16–13
Cleveland	1–5	3–3	—	1–5	4–2	2–4	11–19
Detroit	4–2	4–2	5–1	—	3–3	4–2	20–10
Indiana	2–4	3–3	2–4	3–3	—	3–3	13–17
Milwaukee	3–3	1–5	4–2	2–4	3–3	—	13–17

==== vs. Western Conference ====
vs. Midwest Division

1987–88 NBA records
Team	DAL	DEN	HOU	SAC	SAS	UTA	Total
Atlanta	2–0	1–1	1–1	1–1	2–0	1–1	8–4
Chicago	0–2	1–1	2–0	1–1	1–1	2–0	7–5
Cleveland	1–1	1–1	1–1	2–0	2–0	0–2	7–5
Detroit	1–1	1–1	1–1	2–0	1–1	2–0	8–4
Indiana	0–2	1–1	0–2	2–0	2–0	1–1	6–6
Milwaukee	0–2	1–1	0–2	2–0	1–1	1–1	5–7

vs. Pacific Division

1987–88 NBA records
Team	GSW	LAC	LAL	PHO	POR	SEA	Total
Atlanta	2–0	2–0	0–2	1–1	0–2	2–0	7–5
Chicago	2–0	2–0	1–1	2–0	1–1	1–1	9–3
Cleveland	0–2	1–1	1–1	1–1	1–1	1–1	5–7
Detroit	2–0	1–1	0–2	2–0	1–1	1–1	7–5
Indiana	2–0	1–1	1–1	2–0	0–2	1–1	7–5
Milwaukee	2–0	2–0	2–0	1–1	1–1	1–1	9–3

== Game log ==
=== Regular season ===
1987–88 game log
Total: 54–28 (home: 34–7; road: 20–21)
November: 7–5 (home: 3–1; road: 4–4)

Game	Date	Team	Score	High points	High rebounds	High assists	Location Attendance	Record
1	November 6, 1987; 7:30 PM EST	New York	W 110–99				Pontiac Silverdome; 28,676	1–0
2	November 7, 1987; 9:00 p.m. EST	@ Milwaukee	L 105–119	Dantley, Dumars (20)	Rodman (8)	Thomas (8)	MECCA Arena; 11,052	1–1
3	November 10, 1987; 7:30 PM EST	@ Indiana	L 118–121				Market Square Arena; 11,885	1–2
4	November 13, 1987; 7:30 PM EST	@ Philadelphia	W 113–94				The Spectrum; 12,302	2–2
5	November 14, 1987; 7:30 p.m. EST	@ Cleveland	W 128–113	Thomas (32)	Rodman (10)	Dumars, Thomas (9)	Richfield Coliseum; 10,157	3–2
6	November 18, 1987; 7:30 PM EST	Philadelphia	L 109–113				Pontiac Silverdome; 17,445	3–3
7	November 20, 1987; 7:30 PM EST	Golden State	W 131–108				Pontiac Silverdome; 20,362	4–3
8	November 21, 1987; 8:30 p.m. EST	@ Chicago	W 144–132 (OT)	Dantley (45)	Mahorn, Rodman (8)	Thomas (10)	Chicago Stadium; 18,466	5–3
9	November 24, 1987; 8:00 PM EST	@ Houston	W 97–83				The Summit; 16,611	6–3
10	November 25, 1987; 8:30 p.m. EST	@ Dallas	L 107–113	Dumars (19)	Rodman (10)	Thomas (15)	Reunion Arena; 17,007	6–4
11	November 27, 1987; 7:30 PM EST	San Antonio	W 143–111				Pontiac Silverdome; 30,743	7–4
12	November 28, 1987; 7:30 p.m. EST	@ Washington	L 102–124	Dantley, Thomas (22)	Mahorn (14)	Dumars (8)	Capital Centre; 13,028	7–5

December: 11–1 (home: 8–1; road: 3–0)

Game	Date	Team	Score	High points	High rebounds	High assists	Location Attendance	Record
13	December 1, 1987; 7:30 PM EST	@ New Jersey	W 124–115 (OT)				Brendan Byrne Arena; 8,232	8–5
14	December 2, 1987; 7:30 p.m. EST	Milwaukee	W 115–105	Dantley (25)	Laimbeer (16)	Thomas (13)	Pontiac Silverdome; 18,780	9–5
15	December 4, 1987; 7:30 p.m. EST	Boston	W 128–105	Dantley (21)	Mahorn (14)	Thomas (12)	Pontiac Silverdome; 34,523	10–5
16	December 8, 1987; 7:30 PM EST	Portland	W 127–117				Pontiac Silverdome; 17,126	11–5
17	December 11, 1987; 7:30 PM EST	Washington	W 114–108				Pontiac Silverdome; 17,884	12–5
18	December 12, 1987; 7:30 p.m. EST	New York	W 124–96	Dantley (29)	Laimbeer (11)	Thomas (9)	Pontiac Silverdome; 21,368	13–5
19	December 15, 1987; 8:00 p.m. EST	Chicago	W 127–123 (OT)	Laimbeer (29)	Mahorn (14)	Dantley (7)	Pontiac Silverdome; 23,729	14–5
20	December 18, 1987; 7:30 p.m. EST	Dallas	W 117–112	Dantley (28)	Laimbeer (15)	Johnson (11)	Pontiac Silverdome; 19,426	15–5
21	December 25, 1987; 12 Noon EST	@ New York	W 91–87				Madison Square Garden; 14,549	16–5
22	December 26, 1987; 7:30 PM EST	New Jersey	W 110–75				Pontiac Silverdome; 23,330	17–5
23	December 29, 1987; 7:30 PM EST	Houston	L 91–101				Pontiac Silverdome; 26,498	17–6
24	December 30, 1987; 7:30 PM EST	@ Indiana	W 105–95				Market Square Arena; 12,945	18–6

January: 6–8 (home: 4–2; road: 2–6)

Game	Date	Team	Score	High points	High rebounds	High assists	Location Attendance	Record
25	January 2, 1988; 7:30 p.m. EST	Denver	L 142–151	Thomas (40)	Laimbeer (13)	Thomas (17)	Pontiac Silverdome; 23,746	18–7
26	January 5, 1988; 8:00 p.m. EST	@ Atlanta	L 71–81	Thomas (18)	Laimbeer (16)	Thomas (6)	The Omni; 16,451	18–8
27	January 6, 1988; 7:30 p.m. EST	Atlanta	W 90–87	Thomas (18)	Rodman (16)	Thomas (7)	Pontiac Silverdome; 25,749	19–8
28	January 8, 1988; 8:00 p.m. EST	L.A. Lakers	L 104–106	Dantley, Dumars (25)	Laimbeer, Mahorn (11)	Thomas (10)	Pontiac Silverdome; 40,278	19–9
29	January 13, 1988; 7:30 p.m. EST	@ Boston	L 105–143	Dantley (24)	Mahorn (7)	Johnson (8)	Boston Garden; 14,890	19–10
30	January 15, 1988; 7:30 p.m. EST	Cleveland	W 97–93	Dantley (38)	Dantley, Mahorn (10)	Thomas (11)	Pontiac Silverdome; 19,622	20–10
31	January 16, 1988; 8:30 p.m. EST	@ Chicago	L 99–115	Johnson (22)	Rodman (13)	Thomas (11)	Chicago Stadium; 18,676	20–11
32	January 18, 1988; 4:00 p.m. EST	@ Denver	W 123–116	Dantley (32)	Laimbeer (17)	Thomas (10)	McNichols Sports Arena; 13,004	21–11
33	January 20, 1988; 9:30 p.m. EST	@ Utah	W 120–117	Dantley, Thomas (28)	Laimbeer (15)	Thomas (12)	Salt Palace; 12,212	22–11
34	January 22, 1988; 10:30 p.m. EST	@ Seattle	L 106–109	Laimbeer (21)	Laimbeer (14)	Thomas (15)	Seattle Center Coliseum; 14,737	22–12
35	January 24, 1988; 10:00 PM EST	@ Portland	L 111–119				Memorial Coliseum; 12,666	22–13
36	January 27, 1988; 7:30 PM EST	Indiana	W 103–86				Pontiac Silverdome; 19,801	23–13
37	January 29, 1988; 8:00 p.m. EST	Boston	W 125–108	Dantley (22)	Laimbeer, Mahorn, Salley (11)	Thomas (12)	Pontiac Silverdome; 61,983	24–13
38	January 30, 1988; 7:30 PM EST	@ New Jersey	L 104–116				Brendan Byrne Arena; 11,894	24–14

February: 11–4 (home: 7–0; road: 4–4)

Game	Date	Team	Score	High points	High rebounds	High assists	Location Attendance	Record
39	February 1, 1988; 7:30 p.m. EST	@ Cleveland	L 83–94	Dantley (20)	Laimbeer (13)	Thomas (11)	Richfield Coliseum; 10,636	24–15
40	February 2, 1988; 8:30 p.m. EST	@ Milwaukee	W 99–97	Mahorn (28)	Laimbeer (13)	Dumars (6)	MECCA Arena; 11,052	25–15
41	February 4, 1988; 7:30 PM EST	@ New York	L 93–100				Madison Square Garden; 14,363	25–16
All-Star Break
42	February 9, 1988; 8:30 PM EST	@ Chicago	W 89–74	Laimbeer (17)	Laimbeer (18)	Dumars, Johnson,Laimbeer (6)	Chicago Stadium; 17,846	26–16
43	February 10, 1988; 7:30 PM EST	New York	W 98–87				Pontiac Silverdome; 19,160	27–16
44	February 12, 1988; 8:00 p.m. EST	Atlanta	W 108–92	Thomas (25)	Laimbeer (12)	Johnson (10)	Pontiac Silverdome; 35,884	28–16
45	February 13, 1988; 7:30 p.m. EST	Chicago	W 82–73	Rodman (15)	Rodman (19)	Thomas (7)	Pontiac Silverdome; 40,369	29–16
46	February 15, 1988; 7:30 PM EST	Philadelphia	W 102–95				Pontiac Silverdome; 21,530	30–16
47	February 18, 1988; 7:30 p.m. EST	Seattle	W 108–95	Johnson (27)	Rodman (10)	Thomas (12)	Pontiac Silverdome; 24,482	31–16
48	February 19, 1988; 9:00 p.m. EST	@ Milwaukee	L 108–119	Thomas (32)	Mahorn, Rodman (11)	Thomas (9)	MECCA Arena; 11,052	31–17
49	February 21, 1988; 3:30 p.m. EST	@ L.A. Lakers	L 110–117	Thomas (42)	Laimbeer (14)	Thomas (10)	The Forum; 17,505	31–18
50	February 23, 1988; 10:30 PM EST	@ Sacramento	W 121–105				ARCO Arena; 10,333	32–18
51	February 24, 1988; 10:30 PM EST	@ Golden State	W 107–93				Oakland-Alameda County Coliseum Arena; 14,340	33–18
52	February 26, 1988; 7:30 PM EST	New Jersey	W 137–109				Pontiac Silverdome; 25,334	34–18
53	February 28, 1988; 12 Noon EST	Boston	W 106–101	Dantley (19)	Laimbeer, Mahorn (11)	Dumars (10)	Pontiac Silverdome; 37,462	35–18

March: 11–5 (home: 8–1; road: 3–4)

Game	Date	Team	Score	High points	High rebounds	High assists	Location Attendance	Record
54	March 1, 1988; 7:30 p.m. EST	@ Atlanta	W 117–104	Dumars (25)	Laimbeer, Rodman (9)	Dumars (9)	The Omni; 16,451	36–18
55	March 2, 1988; 7:30 PM EST	L.A. Clippers	W 103–90				Pontiac Silverdome; 16,554	37–18
56	March 5, 1988; 7:30 p.m. EST	@ Washington	L 97–101	Johnson, Thomas (17)	Mahorn (17)	Thomas (8)	Capital Centre; 15,656	37–19
57	March 6, 1988; 7:00 p.m. EST	Milwaukee	W 109–99	Laimbeer (22)	Rodman (11)	Thomas (10)	Pontiac Silverdome; 24,751	38–19
58	March 8, 1988; 7:30 PM EST	@ Indiana	L 104–117				Market Square Arena; 13,220	38–20
59	March 9, 1988; 7:30 p.m. EST	Utah	W 103–98	Laimbeer (27)	Rodman (13)	Thomas (8)	Pontiac Silverdome; 20,623	39–20
60	March 11, 1988; 7:30 PM EST	Phoenix	W 116–88				Pontiac Silverdome; 21,612	40–20
61	March 12, 1988; 7:30 p.m. EST	Cleveland	W 104–100	Dumars, Laimbeer, Thomas (16)	Laimbeer (13)	Thomas (13)	Pontiac Silverdome; 33,854	41–20
62	March 14, 1988; 7:30 PM EST	Sacramento	W 109–97				Pontiac Silverdome; 16,909	42–20
63	March 17, 1988; 7:30 p.m. EST	@ Cleveland	W 102–99	Dantley (20)	Rodman (14)	Thomas (8)	Richfield Coliseum; 13,261	43–20
64	March 20, 1988; 7:00 p.m. EST	Washington	W 118–110	Dumars (25)	Salley (9)	Thomas (6)	Pontiac Silverdome; 22,075	44–20
65	March 22, 1988; 7:30 PM EST	Indiana	W 123–104				Pontiac Silverdome; 18,645	45–20
66	March 25, 1988; 8:30 PM EST	@ San Antonio	L 106–107				HemisFair Arena; 8,596	45–21
67	March 26, 1988; 9:30 PM EST	@ Phoenix	W 108–103				Arizona Veterans Memorial Coliseum; 14,025	46–21
68	March 28, 1988; 10:30 PM EST	@ L.A. Clippers	L 100–102				Los Angeles Memorial Sports Arena; 12,156	46–22
69	March 30, 1988; 7:30 p.m. EST	Atlanta	L 102–103	Thomas (35)	Laimbeer (14)	Thomas (6)	Pontiac Silverdome; 47,692	46–23

April: 8–5 (home: 4–2; road: 4–3)

Game	Date	Team	Score	High points	High rebounds	High assists	Location Attendance	Record
70	April 1, 1988; 8:00 p.m. EST	@ Boston	L 110–121	Laimbeer (22)	Rodman (8)	Thomas (10)	Boston Garden; 14,890	46–24
71	April 3, 1988; 1:30 p.m. EDT	Chicago	L 110–112	Thomas (24)	Rodman (9)	Dumars (9)	Pontiac Silverdome; 23,712	46–25
72	April 5, 1988; 7:30 PM EDT	@ New Jersey	W 125–108				Brendan Byrne Arena; 11,586	47–25
73	April 8, 1988; 7:30 PM EDT	@ Philadelphia	W 96–86				The Spectrum; 15,164	48–25
74	April 9, 1988; 7:30 p.m. EDT	@ Atlanta	W 115–102	Thomas (20)	Laimbeer (16)	Dumars (8)	The Omni; 16,451	49–25
75	April 11, 1988; 7:30 PM EDT	@ New York	L 111–114 (OT)				Madison Square Garden; 13,312	49–26
76	April 13, 1988; 7:30 p.m. EDT	Cleveland	W 115–98	Dantley (28)	Laimbeer (13)	Dumars (6)	Pontiac Silverdome; 18,808	50–26
77	April 15, 1988; 8:00 p.m. EDT	Milwaukee	W 92–91	Rodman (18)	Laimbeer, Mahorn (10)	Thomas (8)	Pontiac Silverdome; 27,126	51–26
78	April 16, 1988; 7:30 PM EDT	New Jersey	W 114–96				Pontiac Silverdome; 22,767	52–26
79	April 19, 1988; 7:30 p.m. EDT	@ Boston	L 110–121	Thomas (21)	Rodman (11)	Thomas (8)	Boston Garden; 14,890	52–27
80	April 21, 1988; 7:30 p.m. EDT	@ Washington	W 99–87	Dantley (31)	Rodman (7)	Thomas (8)	Capital Centre; 11,713	53–27
81	April 22, 1988; 7:30 PM EDT	Indiana	L 98–103				Pontiac Silverdome; 27,881	53–28
82	April 24, 1988; 7:00 PM EDT	Philadelphia	W 128–118				Pontiac Silverdome; 27,854	54–28

1987–88 schedule

=== Playoffs ===
1988 playoff game log
Eastern Conference First Round: 3–2 (home: 3–0; road: 0–2)

Game	Date	Team	Score	High points	High rebounds	High assists	Location Attendance	Series
1	April 28, 1988; 7:30 p.m. EDT	Washington	W 96–87	Thomas (34)	Laimbeer (12)	Dumars (6)	Pontiac Silverdome; 17,356	1–0
2	April 30, 1988; 8:00 p.m. EDT	Washington	W 102–101	Thomas (30)	Laimbeer (11)	Dumars (5)	Pontiac Silverdome; 18,293	2–0
3	May 2, 1988; 8:00 p.m. EDT	@ Washington	L 106–114 (OT)	Thomas (29)	Laimbeer (8)	Thomas (8)	Capital Centre; 9,673	2–1
4	May 4, 1988; 8:00 PM EDT	@ Washington	L 103–106	Dantley, Rodman (23)	Laimbeer (10)	Thomas (10)	Capital Centre; 10,513	2–2
5	May 8, 1988; 3:30 p.m. EDT	Washington	W 99–78	Dumars (20)	Laimbeer (11)	Thomas (11)	Pontiac Silverdome; 18,403	3–2

Eastern Conference Semifinals: 4–1 (home: 2–1; road: 2–0)

Game	Date	Team	Score	High points	High rebounds	High assists	Location Attendance	Series
1	May 10, 1988; 8:30 p.m. EDT	Chicago	W 93–82	Dantley (23)	Laimbeer (14)	Thomas (8)	Pontiac Silverdome; 18,312	1–0
2	May 12, 1988; 8:00 p.m. EDT	Chicago	L 95–105	Thomas (25)	Laimbeer (14)	Thomas (13)	Pontiac Silverdome; 20,281	1–1
3	May 14, 1988; 1:00 p.m. EDT	@ Chicago	W 101–79	Johnson (23)	Laimbeer (10)	Thomas (11)	Chicago Stadium; 18,676	2–1
4	May 15, 1988; 3:30 p.m. EDT	@ Chicago	W 96–77	Dantley (24)	Laimbeer (13)	Thomas (11)	Chicago Stadium; 18,676	3–1
5	May 18, 1988; 8:30 p.m. EDT	Chicago	W 102–95	Thomas (25)	Laimbeer (13)	Thomas (9)	Pontiac Silverdome; 21,371	4–1

Eastern Conference Finals: 4–2 (home: 2–1; road: 2–1)

Game	Date	Team	Score	High points	High rebounds	High assists	Location Attendance	Series
1	May 25, 1988; 8:00 p.m. EDT	@ Boston	W 104–96	Thomas (35)	Mahorn (10)	Thomas (12)	Boston Garden; 14,890	1–0
2	May 26, 1988; 8:00 p.m. EDT	@ Boston	L 115–119 (2OT)	Thomas (24)	Salley (12)	Thomas (11)	Boston Garden; 14,890	1–1
3	May 28, 1988; 3:30 p.m. EDT	Boston	W 98–94	Dumars (29)	Salley (9)	Thomas (6)	Pontiac Silverdome; 26,481	2–1
4	May 30, 1988; 3:00 p.m. EDT	Boston	L 78–79	Laimbeer (29)	Mahorn, Salley, Thomas (8)	Thomas (7)	Pontiac Silverdome; 26,625	2–2
5	June 1, 1988; 8:00 p.m. EDT	@ Boston	W 102–96 (OT)	Thomas (35)	Salley (9)	Dumars, Thomas (5)	Boston Garden; 14,890	3–2
6	June 3, 1988; 9:00 p.m. EDT	Boston	W 95–90	Johnson (24)	Laimbeer (9)	Thomas (9)	Pontiac Silverdome; 38,912	4–2

NBA Finals: 3–4 (home: 2–1; road: 1–3)

Game	Date	Team	Score	High points	High rebounds	High assists	Location Attendance	Series
1	June 7, 1988; 9:00 p.m. EDT	@ L.A. Lakers	W 105–93	Dantley (34)	Laimbeer (7)	Thomas (12)	The Forum; 17,505	1–0
2	June 9, 1988; 9:00 p.m. EDT	@ L.A. Lakers	L 96–108	Dantley (19)	Laimbeer, Mahorn (9)	Dumars, Thomas (7)	The Forum; 17,505	1–1
3	June 12, 1988; 3:30 p.m. EDT	L.A. Lakers	L 86–99	Thomas (28)	Rodman (12)	Thomas (9)	Pontiac Silverdome; 39,188	1–2
4	June 14, 1988; 9:00 p.m. EDT	L.A. Lakers	W 111–86	Dantley (27)	Thomas (9)	Thomas (12)	Pontiac Silverdome; 34,297	2–2
5	June 16, 1988; 9:00 p.m. EDT	L.A. Lakers	W 104–94	Dantley (25)	Laimbeer (11)	Thomas (8)	Pontiac Silverdome; 41,372	3–2
6	June 19, 1988; 3:30 p.m. EDT	@ L.A. Lakers	L 102–103	Thomas (43)	Laimbeer (9)	Dumars (10)	The Forum; 17,505	3–3
7	June 21, 1988; 9:00 p.m. EDT	@ L.A. Lakers	L 105–108	Dumars (25)	Salley (10)	Thomas (7)	The Forum; 17,505	3–4

1988 schedule

== Starting Lineups ==
=== Regular Season ===
1987–88 Regular Season Starting Lineup game log
November

#	Date	Opponent	PF	SF	C	PG	SG
10	November 25	@ DAL	#44; Mahorn	#45; Dantley	#40; Laimbeer	#11; Thomas	#4; Dumars

December

#	Date	Opponent	PF	SF	C	PG	SG
15	December 4	BOS					
20	December 18	DAL	#44; Mahorn	#45; Dantley	#40; Laimbeer	#11; Thomas	#4; Dumars

January

#	Date	Opponent	PF	SF	C	PG	SG
28	January 8	LAL	#44; Mahorn	#45; Dantley	#40; Laimbeer	#11; Thomas	#4; Dumars
29	January 13	@ BOS					
37	January 29	BOS					

February

#	Date	Opponent	PF	SF	C	PG	SG
49	February 21	@ LAL	#44; Mahorn	#10; Rodman	#40; Laimbeer	#11; Thomas	#4; Dumars
53	February 28	BOS					

March

#	Date	Opponent	PF	SF	C	PG	SG

April

#	Date	Opponent	PF	SF	C	PG	SG
70	April 1	@ BOS					
79	April 19	@ BOS					

=== Playoffs ===
1987–88 Playoffs Starting Lineup game log
Eastern Conference First Round: vs. Washington Bullets

#	Date	Opponent	PF	SF	C	PG	SG

Eastern Conference Semifinals: vs. Chicago Bulls

#	Date	Opponent	PF	SF	C	PG	SG

Eastern Conference Finals: vs. Boston Celtics

#	Date	Opponent	PF	SF	C	PG	SG
1	May 25	@ BOS					
2	May 26	@ BOS					
3	May 28	BOS					
4	May 30	BOS					
5	June 1	@ BOS					
6	June 3	BOS					

NBA Finals: vs. Los Angeles Lakers

#	Date	Opponent	PF	SF	C	PG	SG
1	June 7	@ LAL	#44; Mahorn	#45; Dantley	#40; Laimbeer	#11; Thomas	#4; Dumars
2	June 9	@ LAL	#44; Mahorn	#45; Dantley	#40; Laimbeer	#11; Thomas	#4; Dumars
3	June 12	LAL	#44; Mahorn	#45; Dantley	#40; Laimbeer	#11; Thomas	#4; Dumars
4	June 14	LAL	#44; Mahorn	#45; Dantley	#40; Laimbeer	#11; Thomas	#4; Dumars
5	June 16	LAL	#44; Mahorn	#45; Dantley	#40; Laimbeer	#11; Thomas	#4; Dumars
6	June 19	@ LAL	#44; Mahorn	#45; Dantley	#40; Laimbeer	#11; Thomas	#4; Dumars
7	June 21	@ LAL	#44; Mahorn	#45; Dantley	#40; Laimbeer	#11; Thomas	#4; Dumars

== Game Officials ==
=== Regular Season ===
1987–88 Regular Season Officials game log
November

#	Date	Opponent	Officials
10	November 25	@ DAL	No. 34 Ronnie Nunn and No. 21 Bill Oakes

December

#	Date	Opponent	Officials
15	December 4	BOS	
20	December 18	DAL	No. 25 Hugh Evans and No. 32 Eddie F. Rush

January

#	Date	Opponent	Officials
28	January 8	LAL	No. 40 Mike Lauerman and No. 14 Jack Madden
29	January 13	@ BOS	
37	January 29	BOS	

February

#	Date	Opponent	Officials
49	February 21	@ LAL	No. 26 Bruce Alexander and No. 20 Jess Kersey
53	February 28	BOS	

March

#	Date	Opponent	Officials

April

#	Date	Opponent	Officials
70	April 1	@ BOS	
79	April 19	@ BOS	

=== Playoffs ===
1987–88 Playoffs Officials game log
Eastern Conference First Round: vs. Washington Bullets

#	Date	Opponent	Officials	Alternate

Eastern Conference Semifinals: vs. Chicago Bulls

#	Date	Opponent	Officials	Alternate

Eastern Conference Finals: vs. Boston Celtics

#	Date	Opponent	Officials	Alternate
1	May 25	@ BOS	No. 12 Earl Strom and No. 22 Paul Mihalak	No. 13 Mike Mathis
2	May 26	@ BOS	No. 14 Jack Madden and No. 13 Mike Mathis	No. 24 Bill Saar
3	May 28	BOS	No. 17 Joe Crawford and No. 20 Jess Kersey	No. 22 Paul Mihalak
4	May 30	BOS	No. 10 Darell Garretson and No. 4 Ed T. Rush	No. 21 Bill Oakes
5	June 1	@ BOS	No. 11 Jake O'Donnell and No. 42 Hue Hollins	No. 27 Dick Bavetta
6	June 3	BOS	No. 25 Hugh Evans and No. 12 Earl Strom	No. 13 Mike Mathis

NBA Finals: vs. Los Angeles Lakers

#	Date	Opponent	Officials	Alternate
1	June 7	@ LAL	No. 17 Joe Craford and No. 10 Darell Garretson	No. 20 Jess Kersey
2	June 9	@ LAL	No. 20 Jess Kersey and No. 4 Ed T. Rush	No. 25 Hugh Evans
3	June 12	LAL	No. 25 Hugh Evans anrdn No. 12 Earl Strom	No. 11 Jake O'Donnell
4	June 14	LAL	No. 14 Jack Madden and No. 11 Jake O'Donnell	No. 17 Joe Crawford
5	June 16	LAL	No. 17 Joe Crawford and No. 10 Darell Garretson	No. 4 Ed T. Rush
6	June 19	@ LAL	No. 25 Hugh Evans and No. 4 Ed T. Rush	No. 14 Jack Madden
7	June 21	@ LAL	No. 11 Jake O'Donnell and No. 12 Earl Strom	No. 17 Joe Crawford

== Birth of the Bad Boys ==
The Pistons of this era became known as the Bad Boys. At the start of the 1987–88 season, Al Davis, owner of the Los Angeles Raiders of the NFL sent Raiders merchandise to the Pistons to acknowledge the shared view of the teams and their physical style of play. Dan Hauser, Pistons Vice-president of Marketing said, "Al sent us Raiders sweaters, and when we played Golden State in Oakland, Al had Raiders warm-ups for us with our names and numbers on them. The rough bad-boy fighting style of the Raiders fits our image. That`s why, at our home games at the Palace, you see a sea of black: black caps, black T-shirts, black sweatshirts".

The end of season video yearbook produced by the Pistons was titled Bad Boys, with a connection to the 1983 movie, and the Bad Boys name came into being. The Pistons players embraced the rough and tumble image, Nintendo released Bill Laimbeer's Combat Basketball, a futuristic basketball game without rules, without fouls, and weapons are permitted, the Pistons marketed around the Bad Boys identity, and Detroit fan embraced the blue-collar identity. Pistons guard Joe Dumars said, "You can't be great in this league and have zero identity".

The positive view of the team was not universal with Michael Jordan declaring "the Bad Boys are bad for basketball", later adding "I hated them. And that hate carries even to this day." David Stern, Commissioner of the NBA at the time, said, "If I had it to do over again, we would be more aggressive in regulating, shall we say, that style of play, because it led to our game becoming much more physical".

Jalen Rose, who later starred as a member of the Fab Five at Michigan, embraced the Bad Boys brand as a teenager growing up in Detroit, stating "I loved everything about the Bad Boys. I loved how they played and how they didn't back down. They just went out and kicked the other teams' butts." Pistons announcer George Blaha said, "I think the people of Detroit and all across Michigan loved the Pistons' don't-back-down-ever mentality. Detroit's a working person's town and that's the same type of fan that you have all across the state of Michigan from the big cities to the small towns. Never does a day go by that somebody that I talk to doesn't bring up the Bad Boys; they loved 'em".

== NBA Finals ==
=== Game 1 ===
The Pistons had just dispatched the Celtics in six games, while the Lakers were coming off back-to-back seven-game wins over the Utah Jazz and Dallas Mavericks. The Lakers were tired, and it showed. Adrian Dantley scored 34 points, hitting 14 of 16 shots from the field. The Pistons took control of the game with six seconds left in the first half when Bill Laimbeer hit a 3-point shot to put the Pistons up 54–40. Kareem Abdul-Jabbar then fired an inbound pass intended for Byron Scott, but it was intercepted by Isiah Thomas who let fly with another three-pointer which went in at the halftime buzzer. The Pistons had a 57–40 halftime lead and never looked back, stealing Game 1 with a 105–93 win.

=== Game 2 ===
Facing the possibility of going down 2–0 with three games to play in Detroit, the veteran Lakers found resolve with a 108–96 win. James Worthy led the Lakers with 26 points, Byron Scott had 24, and Magic Johnson 23 despite battling the flu.

=== Game 3 ===
With Magic still battling the flu, the Lakers got a key win in Detroit, 99–86, to go up 2–1 in games. The Lakers took control of the game in the third period, outscoring the Pistons 31–14. Despite his illness, Magic had 18 points, 14 assists, and six rebounds.

=== Game 4 ===
With pride in front of their home fans, the Pistons tied the series at 2–2 with a 111–86 blowout win. The Pistons decided to attack the basket and make Magic Johnson defend. Johnson wound up on the bench early in the second half with foul trouble.

With Magic out of the game, the Pistons built a substantial lead. During timeouts, Bill Laimbeer was almost frantic. He kept saying, "No letup! We don't let up!" They didn't, and blew out the defending NBA champions by 25 points.

Left open by the trapping Lakers defense, Dantley led the team with 27 points. Vinnie Johnson came off the bench to add 16 while James Edwards had 14 points and five rebounds off the bench.

=== Game 5 ===
The Pistons' 104–94 victory was a perfect farewell to the Pontiac Silverdome. "I told Joe Dumars with a minute left in the game to look around and enjoy this because you'll never see anything like it again," Laimbeer said. "Forty-one thousand people waving towels and standing. It was awesome."

The Lakers opened Game 5 with a fury of physical intimidation, scoring the game's first 12 points. But that approach soon backfired, as the Laker big men got into foul trouble.

Dantley played a major role in the turnaround, scoring 25 points, 19 of them in the first half, to rally the Pistons to a 59–50 halftime lead. Vinnie Johnson added 12 of his 16 points in the first half to keep Detroit moving.

Joe Dumars added 19 points on 9-of-13 shooting to send the Pistons back to Los Angeles, one win away from their first NBA title.

=== Game 6 ===
This game turned out to be a classic confrontation between a team hungry for their first title (Detroit) and a veteran team with their backs to the wall (the Lakers).

The Lakers led 56–48 in the third quarter when Isiah Thomas suddenly began a classic performance. He scored the game's next 14 points, hitting two free throws, a driving layup, four jump shots, and a running bank shot.

On the Pistons' next possession, Thomas stepped on Michael Cooper's foot, rolled his ankle, and had to be helped from the floor. Despite a severe sprain, Thomas returned to the game 35 seconds later and continued his dizzying onslaught. By the end of the third quarter, Thomas had scored 25 points, an NBA Finals record for one quarter, on 11-of-13 shooting. This helped the Pistons gain an 81–79 lead.

The Pistons' momentum carried into the final period as they led 102–99 with a minute left. Byron Scott cut the lead to one with a 14-footer in the lane with 52 seconds remaining. The Lakers then turned up the defense on the Pistons' next possession, forcing Thomas into a desperation 18-footer. Forty-one-year-old Kareem Abdul-Jabbar then got the ball on the Lakers' trip down the floor and posted up Bill Laimbeer for his signature skyhook. As Kareem shot, Laimbeer was whistled for a foul, even though replays showed he barely touched Kareem. Jabbar then coolly sank the two free throws to put the Lakers up 103–102. The lead held up as Thomas, bad ankle and all, missed another shot at the buzzer.

Thomas would end up with 43 points and eight assists, but it was for naught as the series moved to Game 7.

=== Game 7 ===
Game 7 is often considered one of the best conclusions to the NBA Finals in recent history.

Thomas' ankle was still sore, as evidenced by his limping badly in warmups. He did manage to play the first half, scoring 10 points and leading the Pistons to a 52–47 halftime lead. But, the delay between halves caused the ankle to stiffen, and Thomas could not continue. With Isiah on the bench, the Lakers turned the halftime deficit into a 90–75 lead late in the 4th quarter.

Chuck Daly then went to a faster lineup with Dennis Rodman, John Salley, Joe Dumars, and Vinnie Johnson that created matchup problems for the Lakers and enabled the Pistons to score at a torrid pace. With 3:52 left, Salley canned two free throws to cut the Laker lead to 98–92, sending the Forum fans into a panic.

With 1:17 left, Dumars hit a jump shot to cut the lead to 102–100. Magic Johnson then hit a free throw after a Rodman foul to put the Lakers up by three. On the Pistons' next trip down the floor, Rodman took an ill-advised jumper with 39 seconds left. Byron Scott rebounded and was fouled. His two free throws pushed the lead to 105–100.

After Dumars made a layup, James Worthy hit a free throw and Bill Laimbeer canned a three-pointer, pushing the score to 106–105 with six seconds showing. A.C. Green completed the scoring with a layup off a length-of-the court pass from Magic, making it 108–105, and although the Pistons got the ball to Thomas at midcourt with a second remaining, he fell without getting off a shot.

Worthy racked up a monster triple-double: 36 points, 16 rebounds and 10 assists. For that and his earlier efforts in the series, he was named the Finals MVP.

Pistons owner Bill Davidson said, "Well, the worst loss was out in LA when I was in the room with David Stern getting ready to accept the trophy, and they call a foul on Bill Laimbeer against Kareem. Bill pulled down a clean rebound, and Hugh Evans calls a foul. You know that he was set up, and you know ... I don't say he had a bet on the game, but that was ... that was unconscionable! And that cost us a championship, which we should have had. Which we had."
