= Walker Russell =

American basketball player (born 1960)

Personal information
- Born: October 26, 1960 (age 66) Pontiac, Michigan, U.S.
- Listed height: 6 ft 5 in (1.96 m)
- Listed weight: 195 lb (88 kg)

Career information
- High school: Pontiac Central (Pontiac, Michigan)
- College: Oakland CC (1978–1979); Houston (1979–1980); Western Michigan (1980–1982)
- NBA draft: 1982: 4th round, 78th overall pick
- Drafted by: Detroit Pistons
- Playing career: 1982–1988
- Position: Shooting guard
- Number: 33, 2, 31, 23

Career history
- 1982–1983: Detroit Pistons
- 1983–1984: Detroit Spirits
- 1984: Atlanta Hawks
- 1985: Detroit Pistons
- 1985–1986: Detroit Spirits
- 1986: Kansas City Sizzlers
- 1986–1987: Indiana Pacers
- 1987–1988: Savannah Spirits
- 1988: Detroit Pistons
- 1989: Presto Ice Cream Makers
- 1990: Purefoods TJ Hotdogs

Career highlights
- CBA assists leader (1984); 2× First-team All-MAC (1981, 1982); Third-team Parade All-American (1978)
- Stats at NBA.com
- Stats at Basketball Reference

Walker D. Russell Sr. (born October 26, 1960) is an American former professional basketball player. He was a 6'5" 190 lb (86 kg) shooting guard born in Pontiac, Michigan.

Russell played collegiately for Oakland Community College, the University of Houston, and Western Michigan University. He was selected with the 9th pick of the fourth round (78th overall) of the 1982 NBA draft by the Detroit Pistons. He also played for the Atlanta Hawks and the Indiana Pacers. His stint in the CBA saw him playing for the Detroit Spirits, which later became the Savannah Spirits, and the Kansas City Sizzlers. Russell also took his talents overseas to the Philippine Basketball Association playing for the Presto Ice Cream Makers and the Purefoods TJ Hotdogs.

Since retiring as a player, Russell has served as an assistant coach for the Toronto Raptors and a player scout for the New York Knicks.

His son, Walker Russell, Jr., played collegiately for Chipola Junior College and Jacksonville State University, and has played professionally in the NBA and the NBA D-League. Both father and son started their NBA career with the Pistons. He was the last Pacers player to wear #31 before Reggie Miller.

== Career statistics ==
Legend
GP	Games played	GS	Games started	MPG	Minutes per game
FG%	Field goal percentage	3P%	3-point field goal percentage	FT%	Free throw percentage
RPG	Rebounds per game	APG	Assists per game	SPG	Steals per game
BPG	Blocks per game	PPG	Points per game	**Bold**	Career high

=== NBA ===
==== Regular season ====
Year	Team	GP	GS	MPG	FG%	3P%	FT%	RPG	APG	SPG	BPG	PPG
1982–83	Detroit	**68**	1	11.1	.364	.111	.810	1.1	1.9	.2	.0	2.7
1983–84	Detroit	16	0	7.4	.333	.500	**.923**	1.2	1.4	.3	.0	2.6
1984–85	Atlanta	21	**2**	**18.0**	**.540**	**1.000**	.824	**1.9**	**3.1**	**.8**	**.2**	**4.0**
1985–86	Detroit	1	0	2.0	.000	–	–	.0	1.0	.0	.0	.0
1986–87	Indiana	48	0	10.6	.388	.125	.730	1.1	2.7	.4	.1	3.3
1987–88	Detroit	1	0	1.0	.000	.000	–	.0	1.0	.0	.0	.0
Career		155	3	11.4	.393	.158	.800	1.2	2.3	.4	.1	3.0

==== Playoffs ====
Year	Team	GP	GS	MPG	FG%	3P%	FT%	RPG	APG	SPG	BPG	PPG
1988	Detroit	7	0	1.4	.400	–	1.000	.0	.1	.1	.0	.9
