= 1987–88 Indiana Pacers season =

NBA professional basketball team season

- Head coach: Jack Ramsay
- General manager: Donnie Walsh
- Owner: Herbert Simon
- Arena: Market Square Arena

Results
- Record: 38–44 (.463)
- Place: Division: 6th (Central); Conference: 9th (Eastern)
- Playoff finish: Did not qualify
- Stats at Basketball Reference

Local media
- Television: WTTV (Eddie Doucette, Dick Vitale)
- Radio: WNDE (Mike Inglis, Clark Kellogg)

The 1987–88 Indiana Pacers season was the 12th season for the Indiana Pacers in the National Basketball Association, and their 21st season as a franchise.

== Season summary ==
=== Off-season ===
This season was most memorable as the Pacers had the eleventh overall pick in the 1987 NBA draft, and selected shooting guard Reggie Miller from the University of California, Los Angeles. During the off-season, the team acquired second-year guard Scott Skiles from the Milwaukee Bucks.

=== Regular season ===
With the addition of Miller, the Pacers got off to an 11–7 start to the regular season, and played around .500 in winning percentage, holding a 22–22 record at the All-Star break. The team posted a seven-game winning streak in February, but then lost ten of their next twelve games, finishing in last place in the Central Division, and ninth place in the Eastern Conference with a 38–44 record. The Pacers lost a tie-breaker for the final NBA playoff spot to the 7th–seeded Washington Bullets, and the 8th–seeded New York Knicks, who both finished with the same record. In their final game of the regular season on April 23, 1988, the Pacers lost to the Knicks at home, 88–86 at the Market Square Arena.

Second-year star Chuck Person averaged 17.0 points, 6.8 rebounds and 3.9 assists per game, while Wayman Tisdale averaged 16.1 points and 6.2 rebounds per game, and Vern Fleming provided the team with 13.9 points, 7.1 assists and 1.4 steals per game. In addition, Steve Stipanovich provided with 13.5 points and 8.3 rebounds per game, while John Long contributed 12.8 points per game. Off the bench, Miller averaged 10.0 points per game, while Herb Williams averaged 10.0 points, 6.3 rebounds and 1.9 blocks per game, Ron Anderson contributed 7.3 points per game, Skiles provided with 4.4 points and 3.5 assists per game, but only played 51 games due to a right knee injury, and Stuart Gray averaged 3.0 points and 3.4 rebounds per game.

The Pacers finished 14th in the NBA in home-game attendance, with an attendance of 502,244 at the Market Square Arena during the regular season.

=== Aftermath ===
Following the season, Anderson was traded to the Philadelphia 76ers.

== Offseason ==
=== Draft picks ===
Round	Pick	Player	Position	Nationality	College
1	11	Reggie Miller	SG	United States	UCLA
2	34	Brian Rowsom	PF	United States	UNC Wilmington

== Roster ==
1987–88 Indiana Pacers roster
Players

Pos.	No.	Player	Height	Weight	DOB	From
F	15	Ron Anderson	6 ft 7 in (2.01 m)	215 lb (98 kg)	1958–10–15	Fresno State
C	54	Greg Dreiling	7 ft 1 in (2.16 m)	250 lb (113 kg)	1962–11–07	Kansas
G	10	Vern Fleming	6 ft 5 in (1.96 m)	185 lb (84 kg)	1962–02–04	Georgia
C	55	Stuart Gray	7 ft 0 in (2.13 m)	235 lb (107 kg)	1963–05–27	UCLA
G	25	John Long	6 ft 5 in (1.96 m)	195 lb (88 kg)	1956–08–28	Detroit Mercy
G	31	Reggie Miller	6 ft 7 in (2.01 m)	185 lb (84 kg)	1965–08–24	UCLA
F	45	Chuck Person	6 ft 8 in (2.03 m)	220 lb (100 kg)	1964–06–27	Auburn
F	24	Brian Rowsom	6 ft 9 in (2.06 m)	220 lb (100 kg)	1965–10–23	UNC Wilmington
G	3	Scott Skiles	6 ft 1 in (1.85 m)	180 lb (82 kg)	1964–03–05	Michigan State
C	40	Steve Stipanovich	6 ft 11 in (2.11 m)	245 lb (111 kg)	1960–11–17	Missouri
F	23	Wayman Tisdale	6 ft 9 in (2.06 m)	240 lb (109 kg)	1964–06–09	Oklahoma
G	5	Clinton Wheeler	6 ft 1 in (1.85 m)	185 lb (84 kg)	1959–10–27	William Paterson
C	32	Herb Williams	6 ft 10 in (2.08 m)	242 lb (110 kg)	1958–02–16	Ohio State

Coaches
Head coach
- Jack Ramsay
Assistant(s)
- Mel Daniels
- Dick Harter
- Dave Twardzik

Legend
- (DP) Unsigned draft pick
- (FA) Free agent
- (S) Suspended
- Injured

Roster
Updated: March 4, 1988

== Regular season ==
=== Season standings ===
Central Division	W	L	PCT	GB	Home	Road	Div
y-Detroit Pistons	54	28	.659	–	34–7	20–21	20–10
x-Chicago Bulls	50	32	.610	4	30–11	20–21	16–13
x-Atlanta Hawks	50	32	.610	4	30-11	20-21	16–13
x-Milwaukee Bucks	42	40	.512	12	30–11	12–29	13–17
x-Cleveland Cavaliers	42	40	.512	12	31–10	11–30	11–19
Indiana Pacers	38	44	.463	16	25–16	13–28	13–17

#	Eastern Conference				
#	Team	W	L	PCT	GB
1	c-Boston Celtics	57	25	.695	–
2	y-Detroit Pistons	54	28	.659	3
3	x-Chicago Bulls	50	32	.610	7
4	x-Atlanta Hawks	50	32	.610	7
5	x-Milwaukee Bucks	42	40	.512	15
6	x-Cleveland Cavaliers	42	40	.512	15
7	x-Washington Bullets	38	44	.463	19
8	x-New York Knicks	38	44	.463	19
9	Indiana Pacers	38	44	.463	19
10	Philadelphia 76ers	36	46	.439	21
11	New Jersey Nets	19	63	.232	38

z - clinched division title
y - clinched division title
x - clinched playoff spot

=== Record vs. opponents ===
==== vs. Eastern Conference ====
vs. Atlantic Division

1987–88 NBA records
Team	BOS	NJN	NYK	PHI	WSB	Total
Atlanta	2–4	5–0	3–3	6–0	3–3	19–10
Chicago	3–3	5–1	3–2	4–2	3–3	18–11
Cleveland	3–2	5–1	2–4	3–2	6–0	19–9
Detroit	3–3	5–1	4–2	4–1	3–2	19–9
Indiana	0–5	6–0	2–3	2–4	2–4	12–16
Milwaukee	3–3	3–2	3–3	2–4	4–1	15–13

vs. Central Division

1987–88 NBA records
Team	ATL	CHI	CLE	DET	IND	MIL	Total
Atlanta	—	2–3	5–1	2–4	3–3	4–2	16–13
Chicago	3–2	—	3–3	2–4	3–3	5–1	16–13
Cleveland	1–5	3–3	—	1–5	4–2	2–4	11–19
Detroit	4–2	4–2	5–1	—	3–3	4–2	20–10
Indiana	2–4	3–3	2–4	3–3	—	3–3	13–17
Milwaukee	3–3	1–5	4–2	2–4	3–3	—	13–17

==== vs. Western Conference ====
vs. Midwest Division

1987–88 NBA records
Team	DAL	DEN	HOU	SAC	SAS	UTA	Total
Atlanta	2–0	1–1	1–1	1–1	2–0	1–1	8–4
Chicago	0–2	1–1	2–0	1–1	1–1	2–0	7–5
Cleveland	1–1	1–1	1–1	2–0	2–0	0–2	7–5
Detroit	1–1	1–1	1–1	2–0	1–1	2–0	8–4
Indiana	0–2	1–1	0–2	2–0	2–0	1–1	6–6
Milwaukee	0–2	1–1	0–2	2–0	1–1	1–1	5–7

vs. Pacific Division

1987–88 NBA records
Team	GSW	LAC	LAL	PHO	POR	SEA	Total
Atlanta	2–0	2–0	0–2	1–1	0–2	2–0	7–5
Chicago	2–0	2–0	1–1	2–0	1–1	1–1	9–3
Cleveland	0–2	1–1	1–1	1–1	1–1	1–1	5–7
Detroit	2–0	1–1	0–2	2–0	1–1	1–1	7–5
Indiana	2–0	1–1	1–1	2–0	0–2	1–1	7–5
Milwaukee	2–0	2–0	2–0	1–1	1–1	1–1	9–3

== Game log ==
=== Regular season ===
1987–88 game log
Total: 38–44 (Home: 25–16; Road: 13–28)
November: 0–0 (home: 0–0; road: 0–0)

Game	Date	Team	Score	High points	High rebounds	High assists	Location Attendance	Record
3	November 10, 1987; 7:30 PM EST	Detroit	W 121–118				Market Square Arena; 11,885	2–1

December: 0–0 (home: 0–0; road: 0–0)

Game	Date	Team	Score	High points	High rebounds	High assists	Location Attendance	Record
26	December 30, 1987; 7:30 PM EST	Detroit	L 95–105				Market Square Arena; 12,945	13–13

January: 0–0 (home: 0–0; road: 0–0)

Game	Date	Team	Score	High points	High rebounds	High assists	Location Attendance	Record
30	January 9, 1988; 7:30 PM EST	L.A. Lakers	L 98–101				Market Square Arena; 16,912	15–15
40	January 27, 1988; 7:30 PM EST	@ Detroit	L 86–103				Pontiac Silverdome; 19,801	20–20

February: 0–0 (home: 0–0; road: 0–0)

Game	Date	Team	Score	High points	High rebounds	High assists	Location Attendance	Record
45	February 9, 1988; 10:30 PM EST	@ L.A. Lakers	W 110–108				The Forum; 17,505	23–22

March: 0–0 (home: 0–0; road: 0–0)

Game	Date	Team	Score	High points	High rebounds	High assists	Location Attendance	Record
59	March 8, 1988; 7:30 PM EST	Detroit	W 117–104				Market Square Arena; 13,220	30–29
66	March 22, 1988; 7:30 PM EST	@ Detroit	L 104–123				Pontiac Silverdome; 18,645	32–34

April: 0–0 (home: 0–0; road: 0–0)

Game	Date	Team	Score	High points	High rebounds	High assists	Location Attendance	Record
81	April 22, 1988; 7:30 PM EST	@ Detroit	W 103–98				Pontiac Silverdome; 27,881	38–43

1987–88 schedule

== Player statistics ==
=== Ragular season ===
Player	POS	GP	GS	MP	REB	AST	STL	BLK	PTS	MPG	RPG	APG	SPG	BPG	PPG
Reggie Miller	SG	82	1	1,840	190	132	53	19	822	22.4	2.3	1.6	.6	.2	10.0
John Long	SG	81	81	2,022	229	173	84	11	1,034	25.0	2.8	2.1	1.0	.1	12.8
Vern Fleming	PG	80	80	2,733	364	568	115	11	1,111	34.2	4.6	7.1	1.4	.1	13.9
Steve Stipanovich	C	80	80	2,692	662	183	90	69	1,079	33.7	8.3	2.3	1.1	.9	13.5
Chuck Person	SF	79	71	2,807	536	309	73	8	1,341	35.5	6.8	3.9	.9	.1	17.0
Wayman Tisdale	PF	79	57	2,378	491	103	54	34	1,268	30.1	6.2	1.3	.7	.4	16.1
Herb Williams	C	75	37	1,966	469	98	37	146	748	26.2	6.3	1.3	.5	1.9	10.0
Ron Anderson	SF	74	1	1,097	216	78	41	6	542	14.8	2.9	1.1	.6	.1	7.3
Stuart Gray	C	74	0	807	250	44	11	32	224	10.9	3.4	.6	.1	.4	3.0
Clinton Wheeler	PG	59	0	513	40	103	36	2	149	8.7	.7	1.7	.6	.0	2.5
Scott Skiles	PG	51	2	760	66	180	22	3	223	14.9	1.3	3.5	.4	.1	4.4
Greg Dreiling	C	20	0	74	17	5	2	4	34	3.7	.9	.3	.1	.2	1.7
Brian Rowsom	PF	4	0	16	5	1	1	0	6	4.0	1.3	.3	.3	.0	1.5

== See also ==
- 1987-88 NBA season
