= 1987–88 Philadelphia 76ers season =

NBA professional basketball team season

- Head coach: Matt Guokas (fired); Jim Lynam
- General manager: John Nash
- Owner: Harold Katz
- Arena: The Spectrum

Results
- Record: 36–46 (.439)
- Place: Division: 4th (Atlantic); Conference: 10th (Eastern)
- Playoff finish: Did not qualify
- Stats at Basketball Reference

Local media
- Television: WPHL-TV; PRISM
- Radio: WIP

The 1987–88 Philadelphia 76ers season was the 39th season for the Philadelphia 76ers in the National Basketball Association, and their 25th season in Philadelphia, Pennsylvania. This was the first season of the post-Julius Erving era, after the All-Star guard had retired after the previous season.

== Season summary ==
=== Off-season ===
The 76ers had the 16th overall pick in the 1987 NBA draft, and selected center Chris Welp from the University of Washington. In November, the team signed free agent Albert King, then in December, signed Gerald Henderson and released Steve Colter to free agency; Colter later on signed with the Washington Bullets.

=== Regular season ===
With the addition of King, the 76ers got off to a 12–10 start to the regular season, but then posted a five-game losing streak between December and January afterwards. The team won six of their next seven games, but then posted another five-game losing streak afterwards, falling below .500 in winning percentage. At mid-season, the 76ers traded Roy Hinson, and Tim McCormick to the New Jersey Nets in exchange for Mike Gminski and Ben Coleman. Before the trade, Hinson averaged 11.6 points, 5.8 rebounds and 2.3 blocks per game in 29 games, while McCormick provided with 7.8 points and 6.3 rebounds per game in 23 games. After holding a 20–23 record at the All-Star break, head coach Matt Goukas was fired and replaced with assistant coach Jim Lynam. The 76ers finished in fourth place in the Atlantic Division with a disappointing 36–46 record, and failed to qualify for the NBA playoffs for the first time since the 1974–75 season, ending a 12-year playoff streak.

Charles Barkley averaged 28.3 points, 11.9 rebounds, 1.3 steals and 1.3 blocks per game, and was named to the All-NBA First Team. In addition, Cliff Robinson averaged 19.0 points, 6.5 rebounds and 1.3 steals per game, while Gminski provided the team with 16.9 points, 10.5 rebounds and 1.8 blocks per game in 47 games after the trade, and Maurice Cheeks provided with 13.7 points, 8.0 assists and 2.1 steals per game. Meanwhile, second-year guard David Wingate contributed 8.9 points per game, Henderson contributed 8.4 points and 3.2 assists per game, Andrew Toney averaged 7.3 points and 3.7 assists per game, but only played just 29 games due to continuing foot injuries, King averaged 7.2 points per game, and Coleman provided with 6.9 points and 4.1 rebounds per game in 43 games.

During the NBA All-Star weekend at the Chicago Stadium in Chicago, Illinois, Barkley and Cheeks were both selected for the 1988 NBA All-Star Game, as members of the Eastern Conference All-Star team; it was Cheeks' final All-Star appearance. Barkley finished in fourth place in Most Valuable Player voting, while Cheeks finished tied in eighth place in Defensive Player of the Year voting. The 76ers finished eleventh in the NBA in home-game attendance, with an attendance of 505,245 at The Spectrum during the regular season.

=== Aftermath ===
Following the season, King was traded to the San Antonio Spurs, and Toney retired due to his foot injuries, and a dispute with the 76ers management.

== Draft picks ==
Round	Pick	Player	Position	Nationality	College
1	16	Chris Welp	C	Germany	Washington
2	39	Vincent Askew	SG/SF	United States	Memphis
2	43	Andrew Kennedy	F	Jamaica; United States	Virginia
3	57	Hansi Gnad		Germany	Alaska-Anchorage
3	62	Eric Higgins		United States	Rutgers
4	85	Brian Rahilly		United States	Tulsa
5	108	Frank Ross		United States	American
6	131	Tracy Foster		United States	Alabama-Birmingham
7	154	Eric Semisch		United States	West Virginia

== Roster ==
1987–88 Philadelphia 76ers roster
Players

Pos.	No.	Player	Height	Weight	DOB	From
SG	30	Vincent Askew	6 ft 6 in (1.98 m)	210 lb (95 kg)	1966-02-28	Memphis
PF	34	Charles Barkley	6 ft 6 in (1.98 m)	252 lb (114 kg)	1963-02-20	Auburn
PG	10	Maurice Cheeks	6 ft 1 in (1.85 m)	180 lb (82 kg)	1956-09-08	West Texas A&M
PF	40	Ben Coleman	6 ft 9 in (2.06 m)	235 lb (107 kg)	1961-11-14	Maryland
PG	14	Steve Colter	6 ft 3 in (1.91 m)	165 lb (75 kg)	1962-07-24	New Mexico State
C	42	Mike Gminski	6 ft 11 in (2.11 m)	250 lb (113 kg)	1959-08-03	Duke
PG	12	Gerald Henderson	6 ft 2 in (1.88 m)	175 lb (79 kg)	1956-01-16	VCU
SF	23	Roy Hinson	6 ft 9 in (2.06 m)	210 lb (95 kg)	1961-05-02	Rutgers
C	31	Mark McNamara	6 ft 11 in (2.11 m)	235 lb (107 kg)	1959-06-08	California
SF	4	Cliff Robinson	6 ft 9 in (2.06 m)	220 lb (100 kg)	1960-03-13	USC
PF	45	Bob Thornton	6 ft 10 in (2.08 m)	225 lb (102 kg)	1962-07-10	UC Irvine
SG	22	Andrew Toney	6 ft 3 in (1.91 m)	178 lb (81 kg)	1957-11-23	Louisiana
C	44	Chris Welp	7 ft 0 in (2.13 m)	245 lb (111 kg)	1964-01-02	Washington
SG	25	David Wingate	6 ft 5 in (1.96 m)	185 lb (84 kg)	1963-12-15	Georgetown

Coaches
Head coach
- Matt Guokas (fired)
- Jim Lynam
Assistant(s)
- Fred Carter

Legend
- (DP) Unsigned draft pick
- (FA) Free agent
- (S) Suspended
- Injured

Roster
Updated: March 3, 1988

== Regular season ==
=== Season standings ===
Atlantic Division	W	L	PCT	GB	Home	Road	Div
y-Boston Celtics	57	25	.695	–	36–5	21–20	19–5
x-Washington Bullets	38	44	.463	19	25–16	13–28	13–11
x-New York Knicks	38	44	.463	19	29–12	9–32	10–14
Philadelphia 76ers	36	46	.439	21	27–14	9–32	12–12
New Jersey Nets	19	63	.232	38	16–25	3–38	6–18

#	Eastern Conference				
#	Team	W	L	PCT	GB
1	c-Boston Celtics	57	25	.695	–
2	y-Detroit Pistons	54	28	.659	3
3	x-Chicago Bulls	50	32	.610	7
4	x-Atlanta Hawks	50	32	.610	7
5	x-Milwaukee Bucks	42	40	.512	15
6	x-Cleveland Cavaliers	42	40	.512	15
7	x-Washington Bullets	38	44	.463	19
8	x-New York Knicks	38	44	.463	19
9	Indiana Pacers	38	44	.463	19
10	Philadelphia 76ers	36	46	.439	21
11	New Jersey Nets	19	63	.232	38

z - clinched division title
y - clinched division title
x - clinched playoff spot

== Game log ==
=== Regular season ===
1987–88 game log
Total: 36–46 (Home: 27–14; Road: 9–32)
November: 5–6 (home: 3–1; road: 2–5)

Game	Date	Team	Score	High points	High rebounds	High assists	Location Attendance	Record
1	November 6	Indiana	W 108–95				The Spectrum	1–0
2	November 7	@ Chicago	L 94–104				Chicago Stadium	1–1
3	November 13, 1987; 7:30 PM EST	Detroit	L 94–113				The Spectrum; 12,302	1–2
4	November 14	@ Atlanta	L 83–104				The Omni	1–3
5	November 18, 1987; 7:30 PM EST	@ Detroit	W 113–109				Pontiac Silverdome; 17,445	2–3
6	November 20	Boston	W 116–85				The Spectrum	3–3
7	November 21	@ Cleveland	L 88–101				Richfield Coliseum	3–4
8	November 24	Cleveland	W 108–104				The Spectrum	4–4
9	November 27	@ Golden State	L 103–109				Oakland–Alameda County Coliseum Arena	4–5
10	November 28	@ Sacramento	L 114–115 (OT)				ARCO Arena	4–6
11	November 30	@ Utah	W 106–100				Salt Palace Acord Arena	5–6

December: 7–7 (home: 4–3; road: 3–4)

Game	Date	Team	Score	High points	High rebounds	High assists	Location Attendance	Record
12	December 2	@ L.A. Clippers	L 85–88				Los Angeles Memorial Sports Arena	5–7
13	December 4	Seattle	W 118–105				The Spectrum	6–7
14	December 8	@ Chicago	W 109–96				Chicago Stadium	7–7
15	December 9	Portland	W 94–86				The Spectrum	8–7
16	December 12	Denver	L 121–131				The Spectrum	8–8
17	December 16	San Antonio	W 114–102				The Spectrum	9–8
18	December 17	@ New York	W 110–106				Madison Square Garden	10–8
19	December 19	Dallas	W 95–90				The Spectrum	11–9
20	December 20	@ Boston	L 87–124				Boston Garden	11–9
21	December 22	Boston	L 115–118				The Spectrum	11–10
22	December 23	@ New Jersey	W 110–106				Brendan Byrne Arena	12–10
23	December 25	Atlanta	L 100–106				The Spectrum	12–11
24	December 28	@ Phoenix	L 101–117				Arizona Veterans Memorial Coliseum	12–12
25	December 29, 1987; 10:30 PM EST	@ L.A. Lakers	L 115–131				The Forum; 17,505	12–13

January: 7–9 (home: 7–2; road: 0–7)

Game	Date	Team	Score	High points	High rebounds	High assists	Location Attendance	Record
26	January 1	@ Portland	L 114–116				Memorial Coliseum	12–14
27	January 2	@ Seattle	L 114–116				Seattle Center Coliseum	12–15
28	January 4	Phoenix	W 122–114				The Spectrum	13–15
29	January 6	Utah	W 116–93				The Spectrum	14–15
30	January 8	L.A. Clippers	W 117–103				The Spectrum	15–15
31	January 9	Cleveland	W 126–110				The Spectrum	16–15
32	January 12	@ Milwaukee	L 103–106				MECCA Arena	16–16
33	January 13	New Jersey	W 104–95				The Spectrum	17–16
34	January 15	New York	W 119–104				The Spectrum	18–16
35	January 16	@ New York	L 96–110				Madison Square Garden	18–17
36	January 20	Washington	L 98–110				The Spectrum	18–18
37	January 24	@ Washington	L 99–131				Capital Centre	18–19
38	January 25	@ Washington	L 117–118 (OT)				Capital Centre	18–20
39	January 27	Chicago	L 109–119 (OT)				The Spectrum	18–21
40	January 29	Indiana	W 94–89				The Spectrum	19–21
41	January 31	@ Boston	L 85–100				Boston Garden	19–22

February: 4–10 (home: 4–1; road: 0–9)

Game	Date	Team	Score	High points	High rebounds	High assists	Location Attendance	Record
42	February 3	Golden State	W 96–84				The Spectrum	20–22
43	February 4	@ Indiana	L 95–109				Market Square Arena	20–23
All-Star Break
44	February 9	@ Atlanta	L 110–112				The Omni	20–24
45	February 11	Milwaukee	W 119–113 (OT)				The Spectrum	21–24
46	February 14	@ New Jersey	L 105–109				Brendan Byrne Arena	21–25
47	February 15, 1988; 7:30 PM EST	@ Detroit	L 95–102				Pontiac Silverdome; 21,530	21–26
48	February 17	Cleveland	L 107–115				The Spectrum	21–27
49	February 19	New Jersey	W 115–100				The Spectrum	22–27
50	February 21	@ Milwaukee	L 115–120 (OT)				MECCA Arena	22–28
51	February 22	@ Houston	L 106–119				The Summit	22–29
52	February 24	@ San Antonio	L 121–123 (OT)				HemisFair Arena	22–30
53	February 26	@ Denver	L 104–120				McNichols Sports Arena	22–31
54	February 27	@ Dallas	L 91–100				Reunion Arena	22–32
55	February 29	Chicago	W 102–101				The Spectrum	23–32

March: 9–6 (home: 6–2; road: 3–4)

Game	Date	Team	Score	High points	High rebounds	High assists	Location Attendance	Record
56	March 3	@ Chicago	L 93–97				Chicago Stadium	23–33
57	March 4	@ New York	L 108–110 (OT)				Madison Square Garden	23–34
58	March 6	@ Indiana	W 105–100				Market Square Arena	24–34
59	March 7, 1988; 7:30 PM EST	L.A. Lakers	L 104–110				The Spectrum; 18,168	24–35
60	March 11	Sacramento	W 124–118				The Spectrum	25–35
61	March 13	Washington	W 104–96				The Spectrum	26–35
62	March 15	@ Atlanta	L 90–104				The Omni	26–36
63	March 16	New York	W 115–108				The Spectrum	27–36
64	March 18	Indiana	W 129–109				The Spectrum	28–36
65	March 19	@ Washington	W 94–89				Capital Centre	29–36
66	March 22	@ New Jersey	L 90–102				Brendan Byrne Arena	29–37
67	March 23	Chicago	L 102–118				The Spectrum	29–38
68	March 25	@ Boston	W 97–93				Boston Garden	30–38
69	March 28	Houston	W 108–98				The Spectrum	31–38
70	March 30	Milwaukee	W 134–109				The Spectrum	32–38

April: 4–8 (home: 3–5; road: 1–3)

Game	Date	Team	Score	High points	High rebounds	High assists	Location Attendance	Record
71	April 1	Atlanta	L 93–105				The Spectrum	32–39
72	April 5	New York	L 119–136				The Spectrum	32–40
73	April 8, 1988; 7:30 PM EDT	Detroit	L 86–96				The Spectrum; 15,164	32–41
74	April 10	Boston	L 108–117				The Spectrum	32–42
75	April 11	@ Milwaukee	W 115–102				MECCA Arena	33–42
76	April 13	Washington	W 98–97 (OT)				The Spectrum	34–42
77	April 15	Atlanta	L 101–103 (OT)				The Spectrum	34–43
78	April 16	@ Indiana	L 92–126				Market Square Arena	34–44
79	April 19	Milwaukee	W 115–102				The Spectrum	35–44
80	April 21	New Jersey	W 104–101				The Spectrum	36–44
81	April 23	@ Cleveland	L 99–104				Richfield Coliseum	36–45
82	April 24, 1988; 7:00 PM EDT	@ Detroit	L 118–128				Pontiac Silverdome; 27,854	36–46

1987–88 schedule

== Player statistics ==
Legend
GP	Games played	GS	Games started	MPG	Minutes per game
FG%	Field-goal percentage	3P%	3-point field-goal percentage	FT%	Free-throw percentage
RPG	Rebounds per game	APG	Assists per game	SPG	Steals per game
BPG	Blocks per game	PPG	Points per game

== Awards and records ==
- Charles Barkley, All-NBA First Team

== See also ==
- 1987-88 NBA season
