= Stuart Gray (basketball) =

American-Panamanian basketball player (born 1963)

Personal information
- Born: May 27, 1963 (age 63) Panama Canal Zone, Panama
- Listed height: 7 ft 0 in (2.13 m)
- Listed weight: 235 lb (107 kg)

Career information
- High school: John F. Kennedy (Los Angeles, California)
- College: UCLA (1981–1984)
- NBA draft: 1984: 2nd round, 29th overall pick
- Drafted by: Indiana Pacers
- Playing career: 1984–1993
- Position: Center
- Number: 55, 40

Career history
- 1984–1989: Indiana Pacers
- 1989–1990: Charlotte Hornets
- 1990–1991: New York Knicks
- 1992–1993: Capital Region Pontiacs

Career highlights
- First-team Parade All-American (1981); McDonald's All-American (1981)
- Stats at NBA.com
- Stats at Basketball Reference

Stuart Allan Gray (born May 27, 1963) is an American-Panamanian former professional basketball player. At 7 ft 0 in (2.13 m) tall, he played at the center position.

== Early life ==
Gray attended John F. Kennedy High School in Granada Hills, California and graduated in 1981.

== Basketball career ==
Gray attended UCLA for three seasons between 1981 and 1984, and was afterwards selected with the 29th overall (5th in 2nd round) pick in the 1984 NBA draft by the Indiana Pacers. He played with them for five seasons (1984–85 – 1988–89) before moving on to the Charlotte Hornets (1989–90). During a game on December 12, 1989, where the Hornets were visiting the Los Angeles Lakers, Gray fouled James Worthy, then proceeded to get in a physical altercation with multiple Lakers, for which he was fined $5,000 and suspended one game. Two months later, Gray was traded mid-season to the New York Knicks, where he played in the 1990–91 season, finishing his NBA career that year with eight games. He holds NBA career averages of 2.3 points, 2.6 rebounds, and 0.3 blocks per game.

Gray played internationally with the Panama men's national basketball team.

== Career statistics ==
Legend
GP	Games played	GS	Games started	MPG	Minutes per game
FG%	Field goal percentage	3P%	3-point field goal percentage	FT%	Free throw percentage
RPG	Rebounds per game	APG	Assists per game	SPG	Steals per game
BPG	Blocks per game	PPG	Points per game	**Bold**	Career high

=== NBA ===
==== Regular season ====
Year	Team	GP	GS	MPG	FG%	3P%	FT%	RPG	APG	SPG	BPG	PPG
1984–85	Indiana	52	0	7.5	.380	–	.681	2.4	.3	.2	.3	2.0
1985–86	Indiana	67	**3**	6.3	**.500**	–	.635	1.8	.2	.1	.2	2.3
1986–87	Indiana	55	1	8.3	.406	–	.718	2.3	.5	.2	.5	2.0
1987–88	Indiana	**74**	0	10.9	.466	.000	.603	**3.4**	**.6**	.1	.4	**3.0**
1988–89	Indiana	72	0	10.9	.471	.000	.688	**3.4**	.4	.2	.3	2.6
1989–90	Charlotte	39	1	**11.9**	.463	.000	.641	**3.4**	.4	**.3**	**.6**	2.6
1989–90	New York	19	0	4.9	.235	.000	.875	.7	.1	.2	.1	.8
1990–91	New York	8	0	4.6	.333	–	**1.000**	1.3	.0	.0	.1	1.4
Career		386	5	9.0	.446	.000	.663	2.6	.4	.2	.3	2.3

==== Playoffs ====
Year	Team	GP	GS	MPG	FG%	3P%	FT%	RPG	APG	SPG	BPG	PPG
1986	Indiana	3	0	**4.7**	.000	–	**.500**	**2.3**	.0	.0	.0	.7
1990	New York	**4**	0	3.0	**.400**	–	–	2.0	.0	**.3**	.0	**1.0**
Career		7	0	3.7	.333	–	.500	2.1	.0	.1	.0	.9
