= 1987–88 Cleveland Cavaliers season =

NBA professional basketball team season

- Head coach: Lenny Wilkens
- General manager: Wayne Embry
- Owners: Gordon Gund; George Gund III
- Arena: Richfield Coliseum

Results
- Record: 42–40 (.512)
- Place: Division: 5th (Central); Conference: 6th (Eastern)
- Playoff finish: First round (lost to Bulls 2–3)
- Stats at Basketball Reference

Local media
- Television: WUAB
- Radio: WWWE

The 1987–88 Cleveland Cavaliers season was the 18th season for the Cleveland Cavaliers in the National Basketball Association.

== Season summary ==
=== Off-season ===
The Cavaliers received the seventh overall pick in the 1987 NBA draft, and selected point guard Kevin Johnson from the University of California. During the off-season, the team acquired second-year guard Dell Curry from the Utah Jazz.

For the season, the Cavaliers redesigned their home and road uniforms. The white home uniforms featured a blue, white and orange trim, while the color of the team nickname "Cavs", and jersey numbers were changed from orange to blue; the road uniforms were also changed from orange to blue. The team's new home uniforms would remain in use until 1994, while the new road uniforms would last until 1989, where the team nickname would be replaced with the city name "Cleveland" on the front on their jerseys.

=== Regular season ===
With the addition of Johnson and Curry, the Cavaliers struggled with a 3–8 start to the regular season, but soon recovered and played above .500 in winning percentage for the remainder of the season, holding a 23–22 record at the All-Star break. At mid-season, the team traded Johnson, Tyrone Corbin, and Mark West to the Phoenix Suns in exchange for All-Star forward Larry Nance, and Mike Sanders. Before the trade, West averaged 8.5 points, 5.2 rebounds and 1.5 blocks per game in 54 games, while Corbin contributed 7.3 points per game also in 54 games, and Johnson provided with 7.3 points, 3.7 assists and 1.2 steals per game in 52 games. Despite a six-game losing streak between February and March, the Cavaliers won 11 of their final 13 games of the season, finishing in fifth place in the Central Division with a 42–40 record, and earning the sixth seed in the Eastern Conference.

Second-year star Brad Daugherty averaged 18.7 points, 8.4 rebounds and 4.2 assists per game, while Nance averaged 16.2 points, 7.9 rebounds and 2.3 blocks per game in 27 games after the trade, and second-year guard Mark Price showed improvement becoming the team's starting point guard, averaging 16.0 points and 6.0 assists per game. In addition, second-year guard Ron Harper contributed 15.4 points, 4.9 assists and 2.1 steals per game, but only played 57 games due to a left ankle injury, and second-year forward Hot Rod Williams provided the team with 10.9 points, 6.6 rebounds and 1.9 blocks per game. Off the bench, Curry contributed 10.0 points and 1.2 steals per game, while starting small forward Phil Hubbard averaged 8.4 points and 3.6 rebounds per game, and Craig Ehlo provided with 7.1 points and 2.6 assists per game.

During the NBA All-Star weekend at the Chicago Stadium in Chicago, Illinois, Daugherty was selected for the 1988 NBA All-Star Game, as a member of the Eastern Conference All-Star team; it was his first ever All-Star appearance. Meanwhile, Price participated in the NBA Three-Point Shootout, and Harper was selected to participate in the NBA Slam Dunk Contest, but withdrew due to injury. Price also finished in third place in Most Improved Player voting, while head coach Lenny Wilkens finished tied in sixth place in Coach of the Year voting.

The Cavaliers finished twelfth in the NBA in home-game attendance, with an attendance of 504,847 at the Coliseum at Richfield during the regular season.

=== NBA playoffs ===
In the Eastern Conference First Round of the 1988 NBA playoffs, the Cavaliers faced off against the 3rd–seeded Chicago Bulls, who were led by All-Star guard, Most Valuable Player, and Defensive Player of the Year, Michael Jordan, Charles Oakley and Sam Vincent. The Cavaliers lost the first two games to the Bulls on the road at the Chicago Stadium, but managed to win the next two games at home, which included a Game 4 win over the Bulls at the Coliseum at Richfield, 97–91 to even the series. However, the Cavaliers lost Game 5 to the Bulls at the Chicago Stadium, 107–101, thus losing in a hard-fought five-game series.

=== Aftermath ===
Following the season, Curry was left unprotected in the 1988 NBA expansion draft, where he was selected by the Charlotte Hornets expansion team.

== Draft picks ==
Round	Pick	Player	Position	Nationality	School/Club team
1	7	Kevin Johnson	Guard	United States	California
2	41^{*}	Kannard Johnson	Forward	United States	Western Kentucky
3	52	Donald Royal	Forward	United States	Notre Dame
4	75	Chris Dudley	Center	United States	Yale
4	80^{**}	Carven Holcombe	Guard	United States	TCU
5	98	Carl Lott	Guard	United States	TCU
6	121	Harold Jensen	Guard	United States	Villanova
7	144	Michael Foster	Guard	United States	South Carolina

- 2nd round pick (#29) traded to Portland in Linton Townes deal. Used to draft Lester Fonville.

^{*}2nd round pick acquired from Milwaukee in Paul Thompson deal.

^{**}5th round pick acquired from Indiana in Ron Anderson deal.

== Roster ==
1987–88 Cleveland Cavaliers roster
Players

Pos.	No.	Player	Height	Weight	DOB	From
C	54	Kent Benson	6 ft 10 in (2.08 m)	235 lb (107 kg)	1954–12–27	Indiana
G	30	Dell Curry	6 ft 4 in (1.93 m)	190 lb (86 kg)	1964–06–25	Virginia Tech
C	43	Brad Daugherty	7 ft 0 in (2.13 m)	245 lb (111 kg)	1965–10–19	North Carolina
C	22	Chris Dudley	6 ft 11 in (2.11 m)	235 lb (107 kg)	1965–02–22	Yale
G	3	Craig Ehlo	6 ft 6 in (1.98 m)	180 lb (82 kg)	1961–08–11	Washington State
G	4	Ron Harper	6 ft 6 in (1.98 m)	185 lb (84 kg)	1964–01–20	Miami (OH)
G	12	Kevin Henderson	6 ft 4 in (1.93 m)	195 lb (88 kg)	1964–03–22	Cal State Fullerton
F	35	Phil Hubbard	6 ft 8 in (2.03 m)	215 lb (98 kg)	1956–12–13	Michigan
F	6	Larry Nance	6 ft 10 in (2.08 m)	205 lb (93 kg)	1959–02–12	Clemson
G	25	Mark Price	6 ft 0 in (1.83 m)	170 lb (77 kg)	1964–02–15	Georgia Tech
F	32	Johnny Rogers	6 ft 10 in (2.08 m)	225 lb (102 kg)	1963–12–30	UC Irvine
F	11	Mike Sanders	6 ft 6 in (1.98 m)	210 lb (95 kg)	1960–05–07	UCLA
F/C	18	Hot Rod Williams	6 ft 11 in (2.11 m)	215 lb (98 kg)	1962–08–09	Tulane

Coaches
Head coach
- Lenny Wilkens
Assistant(s)
- Dick Helm
- Brian Winters

Legend
- (DP) Unsigned draft pick
- (FA) Free agent
- (S) Suspended
- Injured

Roster
Updated: March 29, 1988

== Regular season ==
=== Season standings ===
Central Division	W	L	PCT	GB	Home	Road	Div
y-Detroit Pistons	54	28	.659	–	34–7	20–21	20–10
x-Chicago Bulls	50	32	.610	4	30–11	20–21	16–13
x-Atlanta Hawks	50	32	.610	4	30-11	20-21	16–13
x-Milwaukee Bucks	42	40	.512	12	30–11	12–29	13–17
x-Cleveland Cavaliers	42	40	.512	12	31–10	11–30	11–19
Indiana Pacers	38	44	.463	16	25–16	13–28	13–17

#	Eastern Conference				
#	Team	W	L	PCT	GB
1	c-Boston Celtics	57	25	.695	–
2	y-Detroit Pistons	54	28	.659	3
3	x-Chicago Bulls	50	32	.610	7
4	x-Atlanta Hawks	50	32	.610	7
5	x-Milwaukee Bucks	42	40	.512	15
6	x-Cleveland Cavaliers	42	40	.512	15
7	x-Washington Bullets	38	44	.463	19
8	x-New York Knicks	38	44	.463	19
9	Indiana Pacers	38	44	.463	19
10	Philadelphia 76ers	36	46	.439	21
11	New Jersey Nets	19	63	.232	38

Notes

- z, y – division champions
- x – clinched playoff spot

=== Record vs. opponents ===
==== vs. Eastern Conference ====
vs. Atlantic Division

1987–88 NBA records
Team	BOS	NJN	NYK	PHI	WSB	Total
Atlanta	2–4	5–0	3–3	6–0	3–3	19–10
Chicago	3–3	5–1	3–2	4–2	3–3	18–11
Cleveland	3–2	5–1	2–4	3–2	6–0	19–9
Detroit	3–3	5–1	4–2	4–1	3–2	19–9
Indiana	0–5	6–0	2–3	2–4	2–4	12–16
Milwaukee	3–3	3–2	3–3	2–4	4–1	15–13

vs. Central Division

1987–88 NBA records
Team	ATL	CHI	CLE	DET	IND	MIL	Total
Atlanta	—	2–3	5–1	2–4	3–3	4–2	16–13
Chicago	3–2	—	3–3	2–4	3–3	5–1	16–13
Cleveland	1–5	3–3	—	1–5	4–2	2–4	11–19
Detroit	4–2	4–2	5–1	—	3–3	4–2	20–10
Indiana	2–4	3–3	2–4	3–3	—	3–3	13–17
Milwaukee	3–3	1–5	4–2	2–4	3–3	—	13–17

==== vs. Western Conference ====
vs. Midwest Division

1987–88 NBA records
Team	DAL	DEN	HOU	SAC	SAS	UTA	Total
Atlanta	2–0	1–1	1–1	1–1	2–0	1–1	8–4
Chicago	0–2	1–1	2–0	1–1	1–1	2–0	7–5
Cleveland	1–1	1–1	1–1	2–0	2–0	0–2	7–5
Detroit	1–1	1–1	1–1	2–0	1–1	2–0	8–4
Indiana	0–2	1–1	0–2	2–0	2–0	1–1	6–6
Milwaukee	0–2	1–1	0–2	2–0	1–1	1–1	5–7

vs. Pacific Division

1987–88 NBA records
Team	GSW	LAC	LAL	PHO	POR	SEA	Total
Atlanta	2–0	2–0	0–2	1–1	0–2	2–0	7–5
Chicago	2–0	2–0	1–1	2–0	1–1	1–1	9–3
Cleveland	0–2	1–1	1–1	1–1	1–1	1–1	5–7
Detroit	2–0	1–1	0–2	2–0	1–1	1–1	7–5
Indiana	2–0	1–1	1–1	2–0	0–2	1–1	7–5
Milwaukee	2–0	2–0	2–0	1–1	1–1	1–1	9–3

=== Regular season ===
1987–88 game log
Total: 42–40 (home: 31–10; road: 11–30)
November: 3–8 (home: 2–4; road: 1–4)

Game	Date	Team	Score	High points	High rebounds	High assists	Location Attendance	Record
2	November 7, 1987; 7:30 p.m. EST	@ Atlanta	L 105–113	Harper (20)	Corbin (10)	Price (6)	The Omni; 11,455	1–1
3	November 11, 1987; 7:30 p.m. EST	Milwaukee	L 101–107	Daugherty (24)	Daugherty (13)	Daugherty, Price (6)	Richfield Coliseum; 12,145	1–2
4	November 13, 1987; 7:30 p.m. EST	@ Boston	L 114–128	Curry (25)	Hubbard (9)	Price (9)	Boston Garden; 14,890	1–3
5	November 14, 1987; 7:30 p.m. EST	Detroit	L 113–128	Daugherty (22)	West (6)	Price (10)	Richfield Coliseum; 10,157	1–4
6	November 17, 1987; 8:00 p.m. EST	Boston	W 109–88	Hubbard (17)	Curry, Daugherty, West (8)	Price (6)	Richfield Coliseum; 14,621	2–4

December: 10–7 (home: 6–2; road: 4–5)

Game	Date	Team	Score	High points	High rebounds	High assists	Location Attendance	Record
14	December 5, 1987; 7:30 p.m. EST	L.A. Lakers	W 97–95	Hubbard (19)	Daugherty (9)	Price (8)	Richfield Coliseum; 20,015	6–8
18	December 13, 1987; 10:30 p.m. EST	@ L.A. Lakers	L 89–90	Daugherty	Corbin, Daugherty, Williams (7)	Ehlo (7)	The Forum; 17,505	7–11
19	December 15, 1987; 7:30 p.m. EST	Dallas	W 106–93	Daugherty (21)	Ehlo (14)	Johnson (6)	Richfield Coliseum; 6,852	8–11
20	December 17, 1987; 8:30 p.m. EST	@ Chicago	L 100–111	Daugherty (2)	Daugherty, Johnson, Williams (6)	Johnson (8)	Chicago Stadium; 17,650	8–12
23	December 22, 1987; 7:30 p.m. EST	@ Washington	W 106–102	Price (22)	Ehlo (10)	Price (7)	Capital Centre; 4,464	11–12
24	December 23, 1987; 7:30 p.m. EST	Utah	L 83–91	Price (26)	Williams (10)	Daugherty (9)	Richfield Coliseum; 9,202	11–13
27	December 30, 1987; 7:30 p.m. EST	Atlanta	L 110–117	Curry (25)	Daugherty (9)	Daugherty, Price (7)	Richfield Coliseum; 19,029	12–15

January: 9–6 (home: 7–1; road: 2–5)

Game	Date	Team	Score	High points	High rebounds	High assists	Location Attendance	Record
29	January 4, 1988; 7:30 p.m. EST	Denver	W 122–101	Daugherty (25)	West, Williams (9)	Harper (9)	Richfield Coliseum; 6,448	14–15
31	January 8, 1988; 7:30 p.m. EST	@ Atlanta	L 97–101	Hubbard (17)	Daugherty (13)	Daugherty, Price (4)	The Omni; 11,408	23–8
34	January 14, 1988; 7:30 p.m. EST	Chicago	W 91–88 (OT)	Daugherty, Harper (16)	Ehlo (8)	Price (6)	Richfield Coliseum; 16,648	17–17
35	January 15, 1988; 7:30 p.m. EST	@ Detroit	L 93–97	Daugherty (20)	Daugherty (10)	Johnson (7)	Pontiac Silverdome; 19,622	17–18
36	January 17, 1988; 2:30 p.m. EST	@ Milwaukee	L 93–111	Daugherty (19)	Daugherty (8)	Harper (6)	MECCA Arena; 11,052	17–19
37	January 21, 1988; 7:30 p.m. EST	Atlanta	L 93–101	Daugherty (25)	Williams (12)	Curry, Daugherty (4)	Richfield Coliseum; 10,129	17–20
38	January 23, 1988; 7:30 p.m. EST	Boston	W 119–100	Curry (23)	Williams (9)	Harper, Johnson (6)	Richfield Coliseum; 20,900	18–20
39	January 25, 1988; 9:30 p.m. EST	@ Utah	L 96–119	Daugherty, Price, West (14)	Daugherty, West (8)	Johnson (8)	Salt Palace; 12,212	18–21
42	January 30, 1988; 7:30 p.m. EST	Washington	W 128–126 (OT)	Daugherty (29)	Williams (14)	Harper, Price (9)	Richfield Coliseum; 18,749	21–21

February: 7–8 (home: 5–1; road: 2–7)

Game	Date	Team	Score	High points	High rebounds	High assists	Location Attendance	Record
43	February 1, 1988; 7:30 p.m. EST	Detroit	W 94–83	Harper (23)	Williams (15)	Price (10)	Richfield Coliseum; 10,636	22–21
44	February 3, 1988; 7:30 p.m. EST	@ Washington	W 107–106	Williams (23)	Daugherty (10)	Daugherty (11)	Capital Centre; 6,806	23–21
All-Star Break
46	February 9, 1988; 8:30 p.m. EST	@ Milwaukee	L 104–112	Daugherty (19)	Daugherty (10)	Harper (10)	MECCA Arena; 11,052	23–23
47	February 10, 1988; 7:30 p.m. EST	Washington	W 118–102	Williams (23)	Daugherty (13)	Daugherty (6)	Richfield Coliseum; 9,179	24–23
52	February 21, 1988; 1:00 p.m. EST	Chicago	W 113–111	Daugherty (29)	Daugherty (8)	Price (11)	Richfield Coliseum; 20,089	28–25
54	February 24, 1988; 8:30 p.m. EST	@ Dallas	L 89–93	West (16)	West (11)	Harper (6)	Reunion Arena; 17,007	28–26

March: 5–9 (home: 4–2; road: 1–7)

Game	Date	Team	Score	High points	High rebounds	High assists	Location Attendance	Record
58	March 2, 1988; 9:30 p.m. EST	@ Denver	L 81–99	Daugherty, Nance (15)	Williams (10)	Harper (8)	McNichols Sports Arena; 9,178	28–29
59	March 6, 1988; 1:00 p.m. EST	@ Boston	L 98–127	Harper (25)	Williams (8)	Daugherty, Ehlo, Price (4)	Boston Garden; 14,890	28–31
60	March 9, 1988; 7:30 p.m. EST	Milwaukee	W 117–91	Harper (23)	Nance, Williams (9)	Price (8)	Richfield Coliseum; 11,641	29–31
62	March 12, 1988; 7:30 p.m. EST	@ Detroit	L 100–104	Daugherty (24)	Daugherty, Williams (9)	Daugherty (10)	Pontiac Silverdome; 33,854	30–32
64	March 15, 1988; 8:00 p.m. EST	@ Chicago	L 89–108	Harper (20)	Nacne (9)	Harper (9)	Chicago Stadium; 17,752	30–34
65	March 17, 1988; 7:30 p.m. EST	Detroit	L 99–102	Daugherty (21)	Daugherty (8)	Price (7)	Richfield Coliseum; 13,261	30–35
66	March 19, 1988; 9:00 p.m. EST	@ Milwaukee	L 100–101	Price (24)	Daugherty (10)	Price (7)	MECCA Arena; 11,052	30–36
68	March 25, 1988; 7:30 p.m. EST	Chicago	L 110–111 (OT)	Nance (29)	Nance (11)	Curry (6)	Richfield Coliseum; 19,876	31–37
69	March 26, 1988; 7:30 p.m. EST	@ Atlanta	L 102–109	Daugherty (25)	Nance (8)	Harper (8)	The Omni; 16,418	31–38
71	March 30, 1988; 7:30 p.m. EST	@ Washington	W 107–96	Nance (22)	Daugherty (14)	Harper, Price (6)	Capital Centre; 8,387	33–38

April: 9–2 (home: 7–0; road: 2–2)

Game	Date	Team	Score	High points	High rebounds	High assists	Location Attendance	Record
74	April 6, 1988; 7:30 p.m. EDT	Washington	W 98–87	Price (20)	Nance (9)	Harper (7)	Richfield Coliseum; 10,165	35–39
75	April 8, 1988; 7:30 p.m. EDT	Milwaukee	W 104–85	Daugherty (22)	Daugherty, Harper (8)	Harper (6)	Richfield Coliseum; 16,475	36–39
77	April 12, 1988; 7:30 p.m. EDT	Atlanta	W 116–103	Harper (25)	Daugherty (7)	Price (14)	Richfield Coliseum; 12,418	38–39
78	April 13, 1988; 7:30 p.m. EDT	@ Detroit	L 98–115	Nance (20)	Nance (12)	Ehlo (4)	Pontiac Silverdome; 18,808	38–40
79	April 15, 1988; 7:30 p.m. EDT	Boston	W 120–109	Daugherty (44)	Daugherty (9)	Harper (6)	Richfield Coliseum; 20,149	39–40
81	April 22, 1988; 8:30 p.m. EDT	@ Chicago	W 107–103	Price (26)	Daugherty (10)	Price (11)	Chicago Stadium; 17,726	41–40

1987–88 schedule

== Playoffs ==
1988 playoff game log
Eastern Conference First Round: 2–3 (home: 2–0; road: 0–3)

Game	Date	Team	Score	High points	High rebounds	High assists	Location Attendance	Series
1	April 28, 1988; 8:00 p.m. EDT	@ Chicago	L 93–104	Ehlo (21)	Nance (8)	Price (12)	Chicago Stadium; 18,676	0–1
2	May 1, 1988; 3:30 p.m. EDT	@ Chicago	L 101–106	Nance (27)	Daugherty (13)	Nance (8)	Chicago Stadium; 18,645	0–2
3	May 3, 1988; 8:00 p.m. EDT	Chicago	W 110–102	Price (31)	Daugherty (10)	Price (6)	Richfield Coliseum; 20,068	1–2
4	May 5, 1988; 8:00 p.m. EDT	Chicago	W 97–91	Harper (30)	Daugherty (9)	Price (7)	Richfield Coliseum; 20,026	2–2
5	May 8, 1988; 1:00 p.m. EDT	@ Chicago	L 101–107	Price (25)	Daugherty (10)	Price (7)	Chicago Stadium; 18,008	2–3

1988 schedule

== Player stats ==
Legend
GP	Games played	GS	Games started	MPG	Minutes per game
FG%	Field-goal percentage	3P%	3-point field-goal percentage	FT%	Free-throw percentage
RPG	Rebounds per game	APG	Assists per game	SPG	Steals per game
BPG	Blocks per game	PPG	Points per game

=== Regular season ===
Player	GP	GS	MPG	FG%	3FG%	FT%	RPG	APG	SPG	BPG	PPG
Brad Daugherty	79	78	37.4	51.0	0.0	71.6	8.4	4.2	0.6	0.7	18.7
Larry Nance	27	26	33.6	52.6	0.0	83.0	7.9	3.1	0.7	2.3	16.2
Mark Price	80	79	32.8	50.6	48.6	87.7	2.3	6.0	1.2	0.2	16.0
Ron Harper	57	52	32.1	46.4	15.0	70.5	3.9	4.9	2.1	0.9	15.4
Hot Rod Williams	77	50	27.4	47.7	0.0	75.6	6.6	1.3	0.8	1.9	10.9
Dell Curry	79	8	19.0	45.8	34.6	78.2	2.1	1.9	1.2	0.3	10.0
Mark West	54	12	21.9	57.6	0.0	62.1	5.2	0.9	0.5	1.5	8.5
Phil Hubbard	78	59	20.9	48.9	0.0	74.9	3.6	1.0	0.6	0.1	8.4
Tyrone Corbin	54	4	21.3	49.1	0.0	78.6	4.1	1.0	0.8	0.3	7.3
Kevin Johnson	52	3	20.1	46.0	22.2	82.1	1.4	3.7	1.2	0.3	7.3
Craig Ehlo	79	27	21.6	46.6	34.4	67.4	3.5	2.6	1.0	0.4	7.1
Mike Sanders	24	11	17.4	53.8	0.0	87.0	2.0	1.1	0.5	0.2	6.8
Chris Dudley	55	1	9.3	47.4	0.0	56.3	2.6	0.4	0.2	0.3	3.1
Johnny Rogers	24	0	7.0	42.6	0.0	76.9	1.1	0.1	0.2	0.1	2.6
Kent Benson	2	0	6.0	100.0	0.0	50.0	0.5	0.0	0.5	0.5	2.5
Kevin Henderson	5	0	4.0	40.0	0.0	41.7	0.8	0.4	0.0	0.0	1.8
Kannard Johnson	4	0	3.0	33.3	0.0	0.0	0.0	0.0	0.3	0.0	0.5

=== Playoffs ===
Player	GP	GS	MPG	FG%	3FG%	FT%	RPG	APG	SPG	BPG	PPG
Mark Price	5	5	41.0	56.7	41.7	96.0	3.6	7.6	0.6	0.0	21.0
Ron Harper	4	4	33.5	47.6	0.0	68.8	5.0	3.8	2.8	1.0	17.8
Larry Nance	5	5	40.0	53.1	0.0	88.9	7.2	3.6	0.4	2.2	16.8
Brad Daugherty	5	5	40.8	46.0	0.0	67.7	9.2	3.2	0.4	1.4	15.8
Mike Sanders	5	5	26.8	53.8	0.0	80.0	5.0	1.4	0.6	0.4	12.8
Hot Rod Williams	5	0	26.6	50.0	0.0	46.2	5.8	0.8	0.6	1.4	9.2
Craig Ehlo	5	1	25.6	42.5	0.0	62.5	3.6	3.4	1.0	0.0	8.8
Chris Dudley	4	0	6.0	50.0	0.0	50.0	1.5	0.5	0.0	0.0	1.3
Dell Curry	2	0	8.5	25.0	0.0	0.0	0.5	1.0	0.0	0.5	1.0
Phil Hubbard	3	0	7.0	16.7	0.0	0.0	1.0	0.0	0.0	0.0	0.7

Player statistics citation:
