= 1987–88 New Jersey Nets season =

NBA professional basketball team season

- Head coach: Dave Wohl; Bob MacKinnon; Willis Reed
- Arena: Brendan Byrne Arena

Results
- Record: 19–63 (.232)
- Place: Division: 5th (Atlantic); Conference: 11th (Eastern)
- Playoff finish: Did not qualify
- Stats at Basketball Reference

Local media
- Television: WWOR-TV; SportsChannel New York
- Radio: WNEW

The 1987–88 New Jersey Nets season was the 12th season for the New Jersey Nets in the National Basketball Association.

== Season summary ==
=== Off-season ===
The Nets received the third overall pick in the 1987 NBA draft, and selected shooting guard Dennis Hopson out of Ohio State University. During the off-season, the team acquired John Bagley and Keith Lee from the Cleveland Cavaliers in a three-team trade, acquired rookie power forward Dallas Comegys from the Atlanta Hawks, and later on signed free agent Dudley Bradley in December. However, Lee would miss the entire regular season due to a left leg injury.

=== Regular season ===
Despite the addition of Hopson and Bagley, the Nets struggled losing 15 of their first 17 games of the regular season, which included an 11-game losing streak between November and December. After a 2–13 start to the season, head coach Dave Wohl was fired and replaced with assistant General Manager Bob MacKinnon as an interim coach. In January, the team traded Mike Gminski, and Ben Coleman to the Philadelphia 76ers in exchange for Roy Hinson, and Tim McCormick. Before the trade, Gminski averaged 16.9 points and 9.4 rebounds per game in 34 games, while Coleman provided with 11.0 points and 6.4 rebounds per game in 27 games. The Nets held a 10–34 record at the All-Star break, and posted a six-game losing streak in February; at the end of the month, the team hired retired All-Star, and former New York Knicks center Willis Reed as their new coach. The Nets suffered a dreadful 15-game losing streak between March and April, and finished in last place in the Atlantic Division with a 19–63 record.

Buck Williams averaged 18.3 points and 11.9 rebounds per game, and was named to the NBA All-Defensive Second Team, while Hinson averaged 17.6 points, 7.3 rebounds and 1.5 blocks per game in 48 games after the trade. In addition, Orlando Woolridge provided the team with 16.4 points and 3.7 assists per game, but only played just 19 games due to a right hand injury and drug abuse, while McCormick provided with 14.1 points and 6.9 rebounds per game in 47 games, and Bagley contributed 12.0 points, 5.8 assists and 1.3 steals per game. Meanwhile, Otis Birdsong averaged 10.9 points per game, Hopson contributed 9.6 points per game, second-year guard Pearl Washington provided with 9.3 points, 3.0 assists and 1.3 steals per game, Bradley contributed 6.7 points per game, and Comegys averaged 5.6 points and 2.9 rebounds per game.

Williams finished tied in 14th place in Most Valuable Player voting. The Nets finished 15th in the NBA in home-game attendance, with an attendance of 476,054 at the Brendan Byrne Arena during the regular season.

=== Aftermath ===
Following the season, Woolridge signed as a free agent with the Los Angeles Lakers, while McCormick was traded to the Houston Rockets, and Washington was left unprotected in the 1988 NBA expansion draft, where he was selected by the Miami Heat expansion team. Meanwhile, Comegys was traded to the San Antonio Spurs, and Birdsong and Bradley were both released to free agency.

== Draft picks ==
Round	Pick	Player	Position	Nationality	College
1	3	Dennis Hopson	SF/SG	United States	Ohio State
3	48	Jamie Waller		United States	Virginia Union
4	72	Andrew Moten		United States	Florida
5	94	James Blackmon Sr.		United States	Kentucky
6	118	Perry Bromwell		United States	Pennsylvania
7	140	Frank Booker		United States	Bowling Green State

== Roster ==
1987–88 New Jersey Nets roster
Players

Pos.	No.	Player	Height	Weight	DOB	From
G	5	John Bagley	6 ft 0 in (1.83 m)	185 lb (84 kg)	1960-04-23	Boston College
G	10	Otis Birdsong	6 ft 3 in (1.91 m)	190 lb (86 kg)	1955-12-09	Houston
G	22	Dudley Bradley	6 ft 6 in (1.98 m)	195 lb (88 kg)	1957-03-19	North Carolina
F	45	Dallas Comegys	6 ft 9 in (2.06 m)	205 lb (93 kg)	1964-08-17	DePaul
C	50	Chris Engler	6 ft 11 in (2.11 m)	245 lb (111 kg)	1959-03-01	Wyoming
F	21	Roy Hinson	6 ft 9 in (2.06 m)	210 lb (95 kg)	1961-05-02	Rutgers
G/F	23	Dennis Hopson	6 ft 5 in (1.96 m)	200 lb (91 kg)	1965-04-22	Ohio State
F	24	Keith Lee (injured) (IN)	6 ft 10 in (2.08 m)	215 lb (98 kg)	1962-12-28	Memphis
C	40	Tim McCormick	6 ft 11 in (2.11 m)	240 lb (109 kg)	1962-03-10	Michigan
G	12	Kevin McKenna	6 ft 5 in (1.96 m)	195 lb (88 kg)	1959-01-08	Creighton
F	31	Mike O'Koren	6 ft 7 in (2.01 m)	207 lb (94 kg)	1958-02-07	North Carolina
G	14	Duane Washington	6 ft 4 in (1.93 m)	195 lb (88 kg)	1964-08-31	Middle Tennessee
G	1	Dwayne Washington	6 ft 2 in (1.88 m)	190 lb (86 kg)	1964-01-06	Syracuse
F	52	Buck Williams	6 ft 8 in (2.03 m)	215 lb (98 kg)	1960-03-08	Maryland
F	0	Orlando Woolridge	6 ft 9 in (2.06 m)	215 lb (98 kg)	1959-12-16	Notre Dame

Coaches
Head coach
- Willis Reed
Assistant(s)
- Garry St. Jean
- Bob Wenzel

Legend
- (DP) Unsigned draft pick
- (FA) Free agent
- (S) Suspended
- Injured

Roster

=== Roster notes ===
- Power forward Keith Lee was on the injured reserve list due to a left leg injury, and missed the entire regular season.

== Regular season ==
=== Season standings ===
Atlantic Division	W	L	PCT	GB	Home	Road	Div
y-Boston Celtics	57	25	.695	–	36–5	21–20	19–5
x-Washington Bullets	38	44	.463	19	25–16	13–28	13–11
x-New York Knicks	38	44	.463	19	29–12	9–32	10–14
Philadelphia 76ers	36	46	.439	21	27–14	9–32	12–12
New Jersey Nets	19	63	.232	38	16–25	3–38	6–18

#	Eastern Conference				
#	Team	W	L	PCT	GB
1	c-Boston Celtics	57	25	.695	–
2	y-Detroit Pistons	54	28	.659	3
3	x-Chicago Bulls	50	32	.610	7
4	x-Atlanta Hawks	50	32	.610	7
5	x-Milwaukee Bucks	42	40	.512	15
6	x-Cleveland Cavaliers	42	40	.512	15
7	x-Washington Bullets	38	44	.463	19
8	x-New York Knicks	38	44	.463	19
9	Indiana Pacers	38	44	.463	19
10	Philadelphia 76ers	36	46	.439	21
11	New Jersey Nets	19	63	.232	38

z – clinched division title
y – clinched division title
x – clinched playoff spot

== Game log ==
=== Regular season ===
1987–88 game log
Total: 19–63 (Home: 16–25; Road: 3–38)
November: 0–0 (home: 0–0; road: 0–0)

Game	Date	Team	Score	High points	High rebounds	High assists	Location Attendance	Record

December: 0–0 (home: 0–0; road: 0–0)

Game	Date	Team	Score	High points	High rebounds	High assists	Location Attendance	Record
12	December 1, 1987; 7:30 PM EST	Detroit	L 115–124 (OT)				Brendan Byrne Arena; 8,232	9–32
15	December 8, 1987; 7:30 PM EST	L.A. Lakers	L 81–98				Brendan Byrne Arena; 18,008	2–13
24	December 26, 1987; 7:30 PM EST	@ Detroit	L 75–110				Pontiac Silverdome; 23,330	4–20

January: 0–0 (home: 0–0; road: 0–0)

Game	Date	Team	Score	High points	High rebounds	High assists	Location Attendance	Record
41	January 30, 1988; 7:30 PM EST	Detroit	W 116–104				Brendan Byrne Arena; 11,894	9–32

February: 0–0 (home: 0–0; road: 0–0)

Game	Date	Team	Score	High points	High rebounds	High assists	Location Attendance	Record
53	February 26, 1988; 7:30 PM EST	@ Detroit	L 109–137				Pontiac Silverdome; 25,334	12–41

March: 0–0 (home: 0–0; road: 0–0)

Game	Date	Team	Score	High points	High rebounds	High assists	Location Attendance	Record
62	March 14, 1988; 10:30 PM EST	@ L.A. Lakers	L 105–115				The Forum; 17,505	16–46

April: 0–0 (home: 0–0; road: 0–0)

Game	Date	Team	Score	High points	High rebounds	High assists	Location Attendance	Record
73	April 5, 1988; 7:30 PM EDT	Detroit	L 95–107				Brendan Byrne Arena; 11,586	18–55
79	April 16, 1988; 7:30 PM EDT	@ Detroit	L 96–114				Pontiac Silverdome; 22,767	18–61

1987–88 schedule

== Awards and records ==
- Buck Williams, NBA All-Defensive Second Team

== See also ==
- 1987–88 NBA season
