= 1987–88 New York Knicks season =

Season of National Basketball Association team the New York Knicks

- Head coach: Rick Pitino
- General manager: Al Bianchi
- Owners: Gulf+Western
- Arena: Madison Square Garden

Results
- Record: 38–44 (.463)
- Place: Division: 3rd (Atlantic); Conference: 8th (Eastern)
- Playoff finish: East First Round (lost to Celtics 1–3)
- Stats at Basketball Reference

Local media
- Television: WWOR-TV; MSG Network (Marv Albert, John Andariese)
- Radio: WNBC (Jim Karvellas, Ernie Grunfeld)

The 1987–88 New York Knicks season was the 42nd season for the team in the National Basketball Association.

== Season summary ==
=== Off-season ===
The Knicks had the 18th overall pick in the 1987 NBA draft, and selected point guard Mark Jackson out of St. John's University. During the off-season, the team acquired Sidney Green from the Detroit Pistons, and signed free agent and second-year forward Johnny Newman in November. The Knicks also hired Providence College head coach Rick Pitino as their new coach; Pitino had been hired after leading Providence to the Final Four of the 1987 NCAA Division I men's basketball tournament.

For the season, the Knicks slightly redesigned their home and road uniforms, removing the jersey number from the right leg of their shorts; these uniforms would remain in use until 1990.

=== Regular season ===
In the regular season, under Pitino and with the addition of Jackson, the Knicks lost their first five games, and later on held a 16–28 record at the All-Star break. The team had a winning percentage of over .500 for the remainder of the season, finishing with a 38–44 record, which earned them a tie for second place in the Atlantic Division with the Washington Bullets, and the eighth seed in the Eastern Conference. In their final game of the regular season on April 23, 1988, the Knicks faced off against the Indiana Pacers on the road at Market Square Arena for the eighth seed in the Eastern Conference; the Knicks defeated the Pacers, 88–86, to qualify for the NBA playoffs.

Patrick Ewing averaged 20.2 points, 8.2 rebounds, 1.3 steals and 3.0 blocks per game, and was named to the All-NBA Second Team, and to the NBA All-Defensive Second Team, while Gerald Wilkins averaged 17.4 points and 4.0 assists per game, and Jackson provided the Knicks with 13.6 points, 4.8 rebounds, 10.6 assists and 2.5 steals per game, and was named the NBA Rookie of the Year, and also named to the NBA All-Rookie Team. In addition, Bill Cartwright averaged 11.1 points and 4.7 rebounds per game off the bench, while second-year forward Kenny Walker had 10.1 points and 4.7 rebounds per game, and Newman contributed 10.0 points per game. Meanwhile, Green averaged 7.8 points and rebounds per game each, three-point specialist Trent Tucker contributed 7.1 points per game, and Pat Cummings provided the Knicks with 5.5 points and 3.8 rebounds per game.

During the NBA All-Star weekend at Chicago Stadium in Chicago, Illinois, Ewing was selected for the 1988 NBA All-Star Game, as a member of the Eastern Conference All-Star team, while Tucker participated in the NBA Three-Point Shootout for the second time. Ewing also finished tied in fifth place in Defensive Player of the Year voting, while Jackson finished in 13th place in Most Valuable Player voting, and Pitino finished in fifth place in Coach of the Year voting.

The Knicks finished seventh in the NBA in home-game attendance, with an attendance of 586,752 at Madison Square Garden during the regular season.

=== NBA playoffs ===
In the Eastern Conference First Round of the 1988 NBA playoffs, the Knicks faced off against the top–seeded, and Atlantic Division champion Boston Celtics, who were led by the quartet of All-Star forward Larry Bird, All-Star forward Kevin McHale, Robert Parish and All-Star guard Danny Ainge. The Knicks lost the first two games to the Celtics on the road at the Boston Garden, but managed to win Game 3 at home, 109–100 at Madison Square Garden. However, the Knicks lost Game 4 to the Celtics at home, 102–94, thus losing the series in four games.

=== Aftermath ===
Following the season, Cartwright was traded to the Chicago Bulls before draft day, and Cummings signed as a free agent with the Miami Heat expansion team.

== Draft picks ==
Note: This is not an extensive list; it only covers the first round and notable post-first-round picks.

Round	Pick	Player	Position	Nationality	School/Club team
1	18	Mark Jackson	PG	United States	St. John's

== Roster ==
1987–88 New York Knicks roster
Players

Pos.	No.	Player	Height	Weight	DOB	From
G	3	Rick Carlisle	6 ft 5 in (1.96 m)	210 lb (95 kg)	1959–10–27	Virginia
C	25	Bill Cartwright	7 ft 1 in (2.16 m)	245 lb (111 kg)	1957–07–30	San Francisco
F	42	Pat Cummings	6 ft 9 in (2.06 m)	230 lb (104 kg)	1956–07–11	Cincinnati
G	1	Billy Donovan	5 ft 11 in (1.80 m)	171 lb (78 kg)	1965–06–30	Providence
C	33	Patrick Ewing	7 ft 0 in (2.13 m)	240 lb (109 kg)	1962–08–05	Georgetown
F	44	Sidney Green	6 ft 9 in (2.06 m)	220 lb (100 kg)	1961–01–04	UNLV
G	13	Mark Jackson	6 ft 1 in (1.85 m)	180 lb (82 kg)	1965–04–01	St. John's
F	14	Chris McNealy	6 ft 7 in (2.01 m)	210 lb (95 kg)	1961–07–15	San José State
F	4	Johnny Newman	6 ft 7 in (2.01 m)	190 lb (86 kg)	1963–11–28	Richmond
G	6	Trent Tucker	6 ft 5 in (1.96 m)	193 lb (88 kg)	1959–12–20	Minnesota
F	34	Kenny Walker	6 ft 8 in (2.03 m)	210 lb (95 kg)	1964–08–18	Kentucky
G	21	Gerald Wilkins	6 ft 6 in (1.98 m)	185 lb (84 kg)	1963–09–11	Chattanooga

Coaches
Head coach
- Rick Pitino

Legend
- (DP) Unsigned draft pick
- (FA) Free agent
- (S) Suspended
- Injured

== Regular season ==
=== Season standings ===
Atlantic Division	W	L	PCT	GB	Home	Road	Div
y-Boston Celtics	57	25	.695	–	36–5	21–20	19–5
x-Washington Bullets	38	44	.463	19	25–16	13–28	13–11
x-New York Knicks	38	44	.463	19	29–12	9–32	10–14
Philadelphia 76ers	36	46	.439	21	27–14	9–32	12–12
New Jersey Nets	19	63	.232	38	16–25	3–38	6–18

#	Eastern Conference				
#	Team	W	L	PCT	GB
1	c-Boston Celtics	57	25	.695	–
2	y-Detroit Pistons	54	28	.659	3
3	x-Chicago Bulls	50	32	.610	7
4	x-Atlanta Hawks	50	32	.610	7
5	x-Milwaukee Bucks	42	40	.512	15
6	x-Cleveland Cavaliers	42	40	.512	15
7	x-Washington Bullets	38	44	.463	19
8	x-New York Knicks	38	44	.463	19
9	Indiana Pacers	38	44	.463	19
10	Philadelphia 76ers	36	46	.439	21
11	New Jersey Nets	19	63	.232	38

z – clinched division title
y – clinched division title
x – clinched playoff spot

=== Record vs. opponents ===
==== vs. Eastern Conference ====
vs. Atlantic Division

1987–88 NBA records
Team	BOS	NJN	NYK	PHI	WSB	Total
New York	1–5	3–3	—	3–3	3–3	10–14

vs. Central Division

1987–88 NBA records
Team	ATL	CHI	CLE	DET	IND	MIL	Total
New York	3–3	2–3	4–2	2–4	3–2	3–3	17–17

==== vs. Western Conference ====
vs. Midwest Division

1987–88 NBA records
Team	DAL	DEN	HOU	SAC	SAS	UTA	Total
New York	1–1	1–1	1–1	1–1	1–1	1–1	6–6

vs. Pacific Division

1987–88 NBA records
Team	GSW	LAC	LAL	PHO	POR	SEA	Total
New York	2–0	2–0	0–2	0–2	1–1	0–2	5–7

== Game log ==
=== Regular season ===
1987–88 game log
Total: 38–44 (home: 29–12; road: 9–32)
November: 4–8 (home: 3–3; road: 1–5)

Game	Date	Team	Score	High points	High rebounds	High assists	Location Attendance	Record
1	November 6, 1987; 7:30 PM EST	@ Detroit	L 99–110				Pontiac Silverdome; 28,676	0–1
2	November 7, 1987	@ Indiana	95–108				Market Square Arena	0–2
3	November 9, 1987	Boston	87–96				Madison Square Garden	0–3
4	November 11, 1987	Atlanta	93–94				Madison Square Garden	0–4
5	November 13, 1987	@ Washington	101–108				Capital Centre	0–5
6	November 14, 1987	Milwaukee	93–89				Madison Square Garden	1–5
7	November 18, 1987	@ Boston	109–111 (2 OT)				Boston Garden	1–6
8	November 19, 1987	@ New Jersey	107–108				Brendan Byrne Arena	1–7
9	November 21, 1987	Golden State	99–91				Madison Square Garden	2–7
10	November 23, 1987	San Antonio	112–117				Madison Square Garden	2–8
11	November 25, 1987	@ Cleveland	104–101				Richfield Coliseum	3–8
12	November 28, 1987	Cleveland	105–93				Madison Square Garden	4–8

December: 5–10 (home: 5–4; road: 0–6)

Game	Date	Team	Score	High points	High rebounds	High assists	Location Attendance	Record
13	December 1, 1987	Seattle	109–112				Madison Square Garden	4–9
14	December 3, 1987	@ Phoenix	114–120				Arizona Veterans Memorial Coliseum	4–10
15	December 4, 1987	@ Utah	92–104				Salt Palace	4–11
16	December 6, 1987	@ Portland	99–117				Memorial Coliseum	4–12
17	December 8, 1987	Washington	116–92				Madison Square Garden	5–12
18	December 10, 1987	Denver	113–97				Madison Square Garden	6–12
19	December 12, 1987; 7:30 PM EST	@ Detroit	L 96–124				Pontiac Silverdome; 21,368	6–13
20	December 15, 1987	Milwaukee	98–103				Madison Square Garden	6–14
21	December 17, 1987	Philadelphia	96–106				Madison Square Garden	6–15
22	December 19, 1987	New Jersey	125–93				Madison Square Garden	7–15
23	December 22, 1987	@ Milwaukee	102–122				MECCA Arena	7–16
24	December 23, 1987	Chicago	90–89				Madison Square Garden	8–16
25	December 25, 1987; 12 Noon EST	Detroit	L 87–91				Madison Square Garden; 14,549	8–17
26	December 26, 1987	@ Atlanta	98–125				The Omni	8–18
27	December 29, 1987	Portland	123–110				Madison Square Garden	9–18

January: 5–10 (home: 5–1; road: 0–9)

Game	Date	Team	Score	High points	High rebounds	High assists	Location Attendance	Record
28	January 1, 1988	L.A. Clippers	115–96				Madison Square Garden	10–18
29	January 5, 1988	Phoenix	95–100				Madison Square Garden	10–19
30	January 6, 1988	@ Boston	108–117				Boston Garden	10–20
31	January 8, 1988	@ New Jersey	111–118				Brendan Byrne Arena	10–21
32	January 9, 1988	Boston	106–98				Madison Square Garden	11–21
33	January 12, 1988	@ Cleveland	111–119				Richfield Coliseum	11–22
34	January 15, 1988	@ Philadelphia	104–119				The Spectrum	11–23
35	January 16, 1988	Philadelphia	110–96				Madison Square Garden	12–23
36	January 18, 1988	Atlanta	110–102				Madison Square Garden	13–23
37	January 20, 1988	@ Seattle	96–108				Seattle Center Coliseum	13–24
38	January 22, 1988; 10:30 PM EST	@ L.A. Lakers	L 112–113				The Forum; 17,505	13–25
39	January 23, 1988	@ Sacramento	94–97				ARCO Arena	13–26
40	January 26, 1988	New Jersey	122–101				Madison Square Garden	14–26
41	January 28, 1988	@ Washington	90–104				Capital Centre	14–27
42	January 30, 1988	@ Chicago	95–97 (OT)				Chicago Stadium	14–28

February: 8–4 (home: 6–0; road: 2–4)

Game	Date	Team	Score	High points	High rebounds	High assists	Location Attendance	Record
43	February 2, 1988	Washington	110–106				Madison Square Garden	15–28
44	February 4, 1988; 7:30 PM EST	Detroit	W 100–93				Madison Square Garden; 14,363	16–28
45	February 10, 1988; 7:30 PM EST	@ Detroit	L 87–98				Pontiac Silverdome; 19,160	16–29
46	February 13, 1988	Cleveland	120–103				Madison Square Garden	17–29
47	February 15, 1988	New Jersey	97–96				Madison Square Garden	18–29
48	February 16, 1988	@ Indiana	104–117				Market Square Arena	18–30
49	February 18, 1988	Sacramento	108–104				Madison Square Garden	19–30
50	February 22, 1988	@ Boston	93–95				Hartford Civic Center	19–31
51	February 23, 1988	Milwaukee	89–87				Madison Square Garden	20–31
52	February 25, 1988	@ L.A. Clippers	106–96				Los Angeles Memorial Sports Arena	21–31
53	February 26, 1988	@ Golden State	125–119				Oakland-Alameda County Coliseum Arena	22–31
54	February 28, 1988	@ Denver	100–109				McNichols Sports Arena	22–32

March: 9–8 (home: 7–2; road: 2–6)

Game	Date	Team	Score	High points	High rebounds	High assists	Location Attendance	Record
55	March 1, 1988	Indiana	98–96				Madison Square Garden	23–32
56	March 4, 1988	Philadelphia	110–108 (OT)				Madison Square Garden	24–32
57	March 5, 1988	@ New Jersey	85–94				Brendan Byrne Arena	24–33
58	March 7, 1988	Chicago	110–98				Madison Square Garden	25–33
59	March 9, 1988; 8:00 PM EST	L.A. Lakers	L 99–104				Madison Square Garden; 19,591	25–34
60	March 11, 1988	@ Atlanta	115–122				The Omni	25–35
61	March 12, 1988	Utah	108–105				Madison Square Garden	26–35
62	March 14, 1988	Cleveland	104–102				Madison Square Garden	27–35
63	March 16, 1988	@ Philadelphia	108–115				The Spectrum	27–36
64	March 19, 1988	Atlanta	116–110				Madison Square Garden	28–36
65	March 21, 1988	@ San Antonio	133–121				HemisFair Arena	29–36
66	March 22, 1988	@ Dallas	105–124				Reunion Arena	29–37
67	March 24, 1988	@ Houston	117–134				The Summit	29–38
68	March 26, 1988	Boston	106–118				Madison Square Garden	29–39
69	March 28, 1988	Dallas	114–106				Madison Square Garden	30–39
70	March 29, 1988	@ Cleveland	103–108				Richfield Coliseum	30–40
71	March 31, 1988	@ Milwaukee	113–103				MECCA Arena	31–40

April: 7–4 (home: 3–2; road: 4–2)

Game	Date	Team	Score	High points	High rebounds	High assists	Location Attendance	Record
72	April 2, 1988	Houston	104–98				Madison Square Garden	32–40
73	April 5, 1988	@ Philadelphia	136–119				The Spectrum	33–40
74	April 8, 1988	@ Chicago	122–131				Chicago Stadium	33–41
75	April 10, 1988	@ Washington	118–98				Capital Centre	34–41
76	April 11, 1988; 7:30 PM EDT	Detroit	W 114–111 (OT)				Madison Square Garden; 13,312	35–41
77	April 13, 1988	Indiana	127–107				Madison Square Garden	36–41
78	April 15, 1988	Washington	97–106				Madison Square Garden	36–42
79	April 16, 1988	@ Atlanta	95–93				The Omni	37–42
80	April 19, 1988	Chicago	118–121				Madison Square Garden	37–43
81	April 22, 1988	@ Milwaukee	109–118				MECCA Arena	37–44
82	April 23, 1988	@ Indiana	88–86				Market Square Arena	38–44

1987–88 schedule

=== Playoffs ===
1988 playoff game log
First Round: 1–3 (home: 1–1; road: 0–2)

Game	Date	Team	Score	High points	High rebounds	High assists	Location Attendance	Series
1	April 29	@ Boston	L 92–112	Gerald Wilkins (24)	Ewing, Green (11)	Mark Jackson (9)	Boston Garden; 14,890	0–1
2	May 1	@ Boston	L 102–128	Gerald Wilkins (24)	Patrick Ewing (10)	Mark Jackson (7)	Boston Garden; 14,890	0–2
3	May 4	Boston	W 109–100	Johnny Newman (34)	Patrick Ewing (10)	Mark Jackson (14)	Madison Square Garden; 19,591	1–2
4	May 6	Boston	L 94–102	Mark Jackson (28)	Patrick Ewing (20)	Mark Jackson (9)	Madison Square Garden; 19,591	1–3

1988 schedule

== Starting lineups ==
=== Regular season ===
1987–88 Regular Season Staring Lineup game log
November

#	Date	Opponent	PF	SF	C	PG	SG
1	November 6	@ DET					
2	November 7	@ IND					
3	November 9	BOS					
4	November 11	ATL					
5	November 13	@ WSB					
6	November 14	MIL					
7	November 18	@ BOS					
8	November 19	@ NJ					
9	November 21	GS					
10	November 23	SA					
11	November 25	@ CLE					
12	November 28	CLE					

December

#	Date	Opponent	PF	SF	C	PG	SG
13	December 1	SEA					
14	December 3	@ PH0					
15	December 4	@ UTA					
16	December 6	@ POR					
17	December 8	WSB					
18	December 10	DEN					
19	December 12	@ DET					
20	December 15	MIL					
21	December 17	PHI					
22	December 19	NJ					
23	December 22	@ MIL					
24	December 23	CHI					
25	December 25	DET					
26	December 26	@ ATL					
27	December 29	POR					

January

#	Date	Opponent	PF	SF	C	PG	SG
28	January 1	LAC					
29	January 5	PH0					
30	January 6	@ BOS					
31	January 8	@ NJ					
32	January 9	BOS					
33	January 12	@ CLE					
34	January 15	@ PHI					
35	January 16	PHI					
36	January 18	ATL					
37	January 20	@ SEA					
38	January 22	@ LAL					
39	January 23	@ SAC					
40	January 26	NJ					
41	January 28	@ WSB					
42	January 30	@ CHI					

February

#	Date	Opponent	PF	SF	C	PG	SG
43	February 2	WSB					
44	February 4	DET					
45	February 10	@ DET					
46	February 13	CLE					
47	February 15	NJ					
48	February 16	@ IND					
49	February 18	SAC					
50	February 22	@ BOS					
51	February 23	MIL					
52	February 25	@ LAC					
53	February 26	@ GS					
54	February 28	@ DEN					

March

#	Date	Opponent	PF	SF	C	PG	SG
55	March 1	IND					
56	March 4	PHI					
57	March 5	@ NJ					
58	March 7	CHI					
59	March 9	LAL					
60	March 11	@ ATL					
61	March 12	UTA					
62	March 14	CLE					
63	March 16	@ PHI					
64	March 19	ATL					
65	March 21	@ SA					
66	March 22	@ DAL					
67	March 24	@ HOU					
68	March 26	BOS					
69	March 28	DAL					
70	March 29	@ CLE					
71	March 31	@ MIL					

April

#	Date	Opponent	PF	SF	C	PG	SG
72	April 2	HOU					
73	April 5	@ PHI					
74	April 8	@ CHI					
75	April 10	@ WSB					
76	April 11	DET					
77	April 13	IND					
78	April 15	WSB					
79	April 16	@ ATL					
80	April 19	CHI					
81	April 22	@ MIL					
82	April 23	@ IND					

=== Playoffs ===
1987–88 Playoffs Starting Lineup game log
Eastern Conference First Round

#	Date	Opponent	PF	SF	C	PG	SG
1	April 29	@ BOS					
2	May 1	@ BOS					
3	May 4	BOS					
4	May 6	BOS					

== Game officials ==
=== Regular season ===
1987–88 Regular Season Officials game log
November

#	Date	Opponent	Officials
1	November 6	@ DET	No. 29 Steve Javie and No. 16 Wally Rooney
2	November 7	@ IND	
3	November 9	BOS	No. 42 Hue Hollins and No. 39 Jess Thompson
4	November 11	ATL	
5	November 13	@ WSB	
6	November 14	MIL	
7	November 18	@ BOS	No. 23 Bernie Fryer and No. 13 Mike Mathis
8	November 19	@ NJ	
9	November 21	GS	
10	November 23	SA	
11	November 25	@ CLE	
12	November 28	CLE	

December

#	Date	Opponent	Officials
13	December 1	SEA	
14	December 3	@ PH0	
15	December 4	@ UTA	
16	December 6	@ POR	
17	December 8	WSB	
18	December 10	DEN	
19	December 12	@ DET	No. 23 Bernie Fryer and No. 20 Jess Kersey
20	December 15	MIL	
21	December 17	PHI	
22	December 19	NJ	
23	December 22	@ MIL	
24	December 23	CHI	No. 29 Steve Javie and No. 14 Jack Madden
25	December 25	DET	No. 17 Joe Crawford and No. 16 Wally Rooney
26	December 26	@ ATL	
27	December 29	POR	

January

#	Date	Opponent	Officials
28	January 1	LAC	
29	January 5	PH0	
30	January 6	@ BOS	No. 45 Bob Delaney and No. 20 Jess Kersey
31	January 8	@ NJ	
32	January 9	BOS	No. 43 Dan Crawford and No. 25 Hugh Evans
33	January 12	@ CLE	
34	January 15	@ PHI	
35	January 16	PHI	
36	January 18	ATL	
37	January 20	@ SEA	
38	January 22	@ LAL	No. 26 Bruce Alexander and No. 23 Bernie Fryer
39	January 23	@ SAC	
40	January 26	NJ	
41	January 28	@ WSB	
42	January 30	@ CHI	No. 32 Eddie F. Rush and No. 4 Ed T. Rush

February

#	Date	Opponent	Officials
43	February 2	WSB	
44	February 4	DET	No. 27 Dick Bavetta and No. 39 Jess Thompson
45	February 10	@ DET	No. 19 Jim Capers and No. 11 Jake O'Donnell
46	February 13	CLE	
47	February 15	NJ	
48	February 16	@ IND	
49	February 18	SAC	
50	February 22	@ BOS	No. 17 Joe Crawford and No. 35 Jack Nies
51	February 23	MIL	
52	February 25	@ LAC	
53	February 26	@ GS	
54	February 28	@ DEN	

March

#	Date	Opponent	Officials
55	March 1	IND	
56	March 4	PHI	
57	March 5	@ NJ	
58	March 7	CHI	No. 20 Jess Kersey and No. 36 Bennett Salvatore
59	March 9	LAL	No. 26 Bruce Alexander and No. 12 Earl Strom
60	March 11	@ ATL	
61	March 12	UTA	
62	March 14	CLE	
63	March 16	@ PHI	
64	March 19	ATL	
65	March 21	@ SA	
66	March 22	@ DAL	No. 17 Joe Crawford and No. 31 Terry Durham
67	March 24	@ HOU	
68	March 26	BOS	No. 34 Ronnie Nunn and No. 4 Ed T. Rush
69	March 28	DAL	No. 18 Ed Middleton and No. 22 Paul Mihalak
70	March 29	@ CLE	
71	March 31	@ MIL	

April

#	Date	Opponent	Officials
72	April 2	HOU	
73	April 5	@ PHI	
74	April 8	@ CHI	No. 43 Dan Crawford and No. 25 Hugh Evans
75	April 10	@ WSB	
76	April 11	DET	No. 27 Dick Bavetta and No. 4 Ed T. Rush
77	April 13	IND	
78	April 15	WSB	
79	April 16	@ ATL	
80	April 19	CHI	No. 37 Blaine Reichelt and No. 12 Earl Strom
81	April 22	@ MIL	
82	April 23	@ IND	

=== Playoffs ===
1987–88 Playoffs Officials game log
Eastern Conference First Round

#	Date	Opponent	Officials	Alternate
1	April 29	@ BOS	No. 12 Earl Strom and No. 22 Paul Mihalak	
2	May 1	@ BOS	No. 4 Ed T. Rush and No. 42 Hue Hollins	
3	May 4	BOS	No. 25 Hugh Evans and No. 13 Mike Mathis	
4	May 6	BOS	No. 17 Joe Crawford and No. 20 Jess Kersey	

== Player statistics ==
=== Regular season ===
Player	POS	GP	GS	MP	REB	AST	STL	BLK	PTS	MPG	RPG	APG	SPG	BPG	PPG
Patrick Ewing	C	82	82	2,546	676	125	104	245	1,653	31.0	8.2	1.5	1.3	3.0	20.2
Mark Jackson	PG	82	80	3,249	396	868	205	6	1,114	39.6	4.8	10.6	2.5	.1	13.6
Sidney Green	PF	82	65	2,049	642	93	65	32	642	25.0	7.8	1.1	.8	.4	7.8
Kenny Walker	SF	82	61	2,139	389	86	63	59	826	26.1	4.7	1.0	.8	.7	10.1
Bill Cartwright	C	82	4	1,676	384	85	43	43	914	20.4	4.7	1.0	.5	.5	11.1
Gerald Wilkins	SG	81	78	2,703	270	326	90	22	1,412	33.4	3.3	4.0	1.1	.3	17.4
Johnny Newman	SF	77	25	1,589	159	62	72	11	773	20.6	2.1	.8	.9	.1	10.0
Trent Tucker	SG	71	4	1,248	119	117	53	6	506	17.6	1.7	1.6	.7	.1	7.1
Pat Cummings	PF	62	9	946	235	37	20	10	339	15.3	3.8	.6	.3	.2	5.5
Billy Donovan	PG	44	0	364	25	87	16	1	105	8.3	.6	2.0	.4	.0	2.4
Louis Orr	SF	29	0	180	34	9	6	0	40	6.2	1.2	.3	.2	.0	1.4
Rick Carlisle	SG	26	0	204	13	32	11	4	74	7.8	.5	1.2	.4	.2	2.8
Sedric Toney	PG	21	0	139	8	24	9	1	57	6.6	.4	1.1	.4	.0	2.7
Chris McNealy	PF	19	0	265	64	23	16	2	67	13.9	3.4	1.2	.8	.1	3.5
Tony White^{†}	PG	12	0	117	3	10	1	0	43	9.8	.3	.8	.1	.0	3.6
Ray Tolbert^{†}	PF	11	0	177	35	5	5	2	47	16.1	3.2	.5	.5	.2	4.3
Bob Thornton^{†}	PF	7	0	85	13	4	2	0	17	12.1	1.9	.6	.3	.0	2.4
Gerald Henderson^{†}	PG	6	2	69	10	13	2	0	14	11.5	1.7	2.2	.3	.0	2.3
Carey Scurry^{†}	SF	4	0	8	3	1	2	1	2	2.0	.8	.3	.5	.3	.5
Rory Sparrow^{†}	PG	3	0	52	2	5	4	0	10	17.3	.7	1.7	1.3	.0	3.3

=== Playoffs ===
Player	POS	GP	GS	MP	REB	AST	STL	BLK	PTS	MPG	RPG	APG	SPG	BPG	PPG
Mark Jackson	PG	4	4	171	19	39	10	0	57	42.8	4.8	9.8	2.5	.0	14.3
Patrick Ewing	C	4	4	153	51	10	6	13	75	38.3	12.8	2.5	1.5	3.3	18.8
Gerald Wilkins	SG	4	4	149	8	19	4	0	80	37.3	2.0	4.8	1.0	.0	20.0
Sidney Green	PF	4	4	93	33	7	0	1	16	23.3	8.3	1.8	.0	.3	4.0
Johnny Newman	SF	4	2	113	11	7	6	1	76	28.3	2.8	1.8	1.5	.3	19.0
Kenny Walker	SF	4	2	80	9	5	2	3	18	20.0	2.3	1.3	.5	.8	4.5
Bill Cartwright	C	4	0	76	19	6	0	3	29	19.0	4.8	1.5	.0	.8	7.3
Trent Tucker	SG	4	0	71	2	4	3	0	25	17.8	.5	1.0	.8	.0	6.3
Pat Cummings	PF	3	0	28	7	3	0	0	7	9.3	2.3	1.0	.0	.0	2.3
Sedric Toney	PG	3	0	15	0	2	1	0	11	5.0	.0	.7	.3	.0	3.7
Rick Carlisle	SG	2	0	8	2	0	1	0	2	4.0	1.0	.0	.5	.0	1.0
Louis Orr	SF	2	0	3	2	0	0	0	1	1.5	1.0	.0	.0	.0	.5

- ^{†} Denotes player spent time with another team in the season. Stats reflect time with the Knicks only.

== Awards and records ==
- Mark Jackson, NBA Rookie of the Year Award
- Patrick Ewing, All-NBA Second Team
- Patrick Ewing, NBA All-Defensive Second Team
- Mark Jackson, NBA All-Rookie Team 1st Team
