= Kannard Johnson =

American basketball player

Personal information
- Born: June 24, 1965 (age 61) Cincinnati, Ohio, U.S.
- Listed height: 6 ft 9 in (2.06 m)
- Listed weight: 220 lb (100 kg)

Career information
- High school: Taft (Cincinnati, Ohio)
- College: Western Kentucky (1983–1987)
- NBA draft: 1987: 2nd round, 41st overall pick
- Drafted by: Cleveland Cavaliers
- Position: Small forward
- Number: 33

Career history
- 1987: Cleveland Cavaliers
- 1989–1993: TSV Bayer 04 Leverkusen

Career highlights
- First-team All-Sun Belt (1987); 2× Second-team All-Sun Belt (1985, 1986)
- Stats at NBA.com
- Stats at Basketball Reference

Kannard Johnson (born June 24, 1965) is an American retired college and professional basketball player. He was selected by the National Basketball Association's Cleveland Cavaliers with the 41st overall pick (second round) of the 1987 NBA draft.

Born and raised in Cincinnati, Johnson, played college basketball for the Western Kentucky Hilltoppers. At Western Kentucky University, he was a key player in the resurgence of the basketball program. He was a four-year starter and led the team to its first Sun Belt Conference basketball championship, a top ten national ranking, a 2nd-place finish in the pre-season NIT, and back-to-back NCAA tournament appearances.

Johnson appeared in four games with the Cavaliers in the 1987–88 NBA season. He scored 2 points with a 33% field goal percentage in the 12 minutes he played.

== Career statistics ==
Legend
GP	Games played	GS	Games started	MPG	Minutes per game
FG%	Field goal percentage	3P%	3-point field goal percentage	FT%	Free throw percentage
RPG	Rebounds per game	APG	Assists per game	SPG	Steals per game
BPG	Blocks per game	PPG	Points per game	**Bold**	Career high

=== NBA ===
==== Regular season ====
Year	Team	GP	GS	MPG	FG%	3P%	FT%	RPG	APG	SPG	BPG	PPG
1987–88	Cleveland	4	0	3.0	.333	–	–	.0	.0	.3	.0	.5
