= 1987–88 Washington Bullets season =

NBA professional basketball team season

- Head coach: Kevin Loughery (fired) (8–19); Wes Unseld (30–25)
- General manager: Bob Ferry
- Owner: Abe Pollin
- Arena: Capital Centre

Results
- Record: 38–44 (.463)
- Place: Division: 2nd (Atlantic); Conference: 7th (Eastern)
- Playoff finish: First round (lost to Pistons 2–3)
- Stats at Basketball Reference

Local media
- Television: WDCA; Home Team Sports
- Radio: WTOP

The 1987–88 Washington Bullets season was the 27th season for the Washington Bullets in the National Basketball Association, and their 15th season in Washington, D.C.

== Season summary ==
=== Off-season ===
The Bullets had the twelfth overall pick in the 1987 NBA draft, and selected 5' 3" point guard Muggsy Bogues out of Wake Forest University; Bogues would become the shortest player in NBA history, and would also team up with 7' 7" center Manute Bol, who was the tallest player in NBA history. During the off-season, the Bullets signed free agent All-Star forward Bernard King, who previously dealt with knee injuries with his former team, the New York Knicks, acquired Darrell Walker and Mark Alarie from the Denver Nuggets, and later on signed Steve Colter.

For the season, the Bullets redesigned their primary logo; the team removed the city name "Washington", and modified the team name "Bullets" in royal blue, removing the fingers from the two letter "L's" catching a red basketball with white seams. The team also redesigned their home and road uniforms, replacing their previous stars-and-stripes pattern jerseys with white home uniforms featuring a blue and red trim, and red road uniforms with a blue and white trim; both uniforms featured a blue wordmark of the team name on the front of their jerseys.

The team's new primary logo, and new uniforms would both remain in use until 1997.

=== Regular season ===
With the addition of King, Walker and Bogues, the Bullets struggled losing eight of their first ten games of the regular season, as head coach Kevin Loughery was fired after an 8–19 start to the season, and was replaced with former Bullets All-Star forward Wes Unseld as their new coach. Under Unseld, the team held a 17–25 record at the All-Star break, and posted a seven-game winning streak between February and March. The Bullets finished in second place in the Atlantic Division with a 38–44 record, and earned the seventh seed in the Eastern Conference.

Jeff Malone led the Bullets in scoring with 20.5 points per game, while Moses Malone averaged 20.3 points and 11.2 rebounds per game, and King provided the team with 17.2 points per game. In addition, second-year forward Hot Plate Williams averaged 12.8 points, 5.4 rebounds and 1.4 steals per game, while Terry Catledge provided with 10.7 points and 5.7 rebounds per game, and Colter contributed 8.0 points and 4.2 assists per game. Off the bench, Frank Johnson averaged 7.4 points and 2.5 assists per game, while Walker provided with 6.0 points and 1.2 steals per game, and Bogues contributed 5.0 points, 5.1 assists and 1.6 steals per game. On the defensive side, Charles Jones averaged 2.9 points, 4.7 rebounds and 1.6 blocks per game, and Bol provided with 2.3 points, 3.6 rebounds and 2.7 blocks per game off the bench.

During the NBA All-Star weekend at the Chicago Stadium in Chicago, Illinois, Moses Malone was selected for the 1988 NBA All-Star Game, as a member of the Eastern Conference All-Star team. Bol finished tied in eighth place in Defensive Player of the Year voting. The Bullets finished 20th in the NBA in home-game attendance, with an attendance of 433,376 at the Capital Centre during the regular season, which was the fourth-lowest in the league.

=== NBA playoffs ===
In the Eastern Conference First Round of the 1988 NBA playoffs, the Bullets faced off against the 2nd–seeded, and Central Division champion Detroit Pistons, who were led by the trio of All-Star guard Isiah Thomas, Adrian Dantley and Joe Dumars. The Bullets lost the first two games to the Pistons on the road at the Pontiac Silverdome, but managed to win the next two games at home, which included a Game 4 win over the Pistons at the Capital Centre, 106–103 to even the series. However, the Bullets lost Game 5 to the Pistons at the Pontiac Silverdome, 99–78, thus losing in a hard-fought five-game series.

This would also be the Bullets' final NBA playoff appearance until the 1996–97 season, as what would follow was an eight-year playoff drought. The Pistons would advance to the NBA Finals, but would lose to the defending NBA champion Los Angeles Lakers in a full seven-game series in the 1988 NBA Finals.

=== Aftermath ===
Following the season, Moses Malone signed as a free agent with the Atlanta Hawks after two seasons with the Bullets, while Bol was traded to the Golden State Warriors, and Bogues was left unprotected in the 1988 NBA expansion draft, where he was selected by the Charlotte Hornets expansion team.

== Draft picks ==
Round	Pick	Player	Position	Nationality	College
1	12	Muggsy Bogues	PG	United States	Wake Forest
2	36	Duane Washington	SG	United States	Middle Tennessee State
2	37	Derrick Dowell		United States	Southern California
3	59	Danny Pearson		United States	Jacksonville
4	81	Scott Thompson	C	United States	San Diego
5	106	Patrick Fairs		United States	Texas
6	128	Dwayne Scholten		United States	Washington State
7	150	Jamie Dixon		United States	Texas Christian

== Roster ==
1987–88 Washington Bullets roster
Players

Pos.	No.	Player	Height	Weight	DOB	From
PF	31	Mark Alarie	6 ft 8 in (2.03 m)	217 lb (98 kg)	1963-12-11	Duke
PG	1	Muggsy Bogues	5 ft 3 in (1.60 m)	136 lb (62 kg)	1965-01-09	Wake Forest
C	10	Manute Bol	7 ft 6 in (2.29 m)	200 lb (91 kg)	1962-10-16	Bridgeport
PF	33	Terry Catledge	6 ft 8 in (2.03 m)	220 lb (100 kg)	1963-08-22	South Alabama
PG	20	Steve Colter	6 ft 3 in (1.91 m)	165 lb (75 kg)	1962-07-24	New Mexico State
PG	15	Frank Johnson	6 ft 1 in (1.85 m)	185 lb (84 kg)	1958-11-23	Wake Forest
PF	23	Charles Jones	6 ft 9 in (2.06 m)	215 lb (98 kg)	1957-04-03	Albany State
SF	30	Bernard King	6 ft 7 in (2.01 m)	205 lb (93 kg)	1956-12-04	Tennessee
SG	24	Jeff Malone	6 ft 4 in (1.93 m)	205 lb (93 kg)	1961-06-28	Mississippi State
C	4	Moses Malone	6 ft 10 in (2.08 m)	215 lb (98 kg)	1955-03-23	Petersburg HS (VA)
PF	42	Jay Murphy	6 ft 9 in (2.06 m)	220 lb (100 kg)	1962-06-26	Boston College
SG	5	Darrell Walker	6 ft 4 in (1.93 m)	180 lb (82 kg)	1961-03-09	Arkansas
SF	34	John Williams	6 ft 8 in (2.03 m)	235 lb (107 kg)	1966-10-26	LSU

Coaches
Head coach
- Kevin Loughery (fired)
- Wes Unseld
Assistant(s)
- Bill Blair

Legend
- (DP) Unsigned draft pick
- (FA) Free agent
- (S) Suspended
- Injured

Roster
Updated: January 21, 1988

== Regular season ==
=== Season standings ===
Atlantic Division	W	L	PCT	GB	Home	Road	Div
y-Boston Celtics	57	25	.695	–	36–5	21–20	19–5
x-Washington Bullets	38	44	.463	19	25–16	13–28	13–11
x-New York Knicks	38	44	.463	19	29–12	9–32	10–14
Philadelphia 76ers	36	46	.439	21	27–14	9–32	12–12
New Jersey Nets	19	63	.232	38	16–25	3–38	6–18

#	Eastern Conference				
#	Team	W	L	PCT	GB
1	c-Boston Celtics	57	25	.695	–
2	y-Detroit Pistons	54	28	.659	3
3	x-Chicago Bulls	50	32	.610	7
4	x-Atlanta Hawks	50	32	.610	7
5	x-Milwaukee Bucks	42	40	.512	15
6	x-Cleveland Cavaliers	42	40	.512	15
7	x-Washington Bullets	38	44	.463	19
8	x-New York Knicks	38	44	.463	19
9	Indiana Pacers	38	44	.463	19
10	Philadelphia 76ers	36	46	.439	21
11	New Jersey Nets	19	63	.232	38

Notes

- z, y – division champions
- x – clinched playoff spot

== Game log ==
=== Regular season ===
1987–88 game log
Total: 38–44 (home: 25–16; road: 13–28)
November: 4–8 (home: 2–2; road: 2–6)

Game	Date	Team	Score	High points	High rebounds	High assists	Location Attendance	Record
1	November 6, 1987; 7:30 p.m. EST	@ Atlanta	L 97–114	M. Malone (32)	M. Malone (12)	Bogues (6)	The Omni; 16,064	0–1
2	November 7, 1987; 7:30 p.m. EST	Boston	L 139–140 (2OT)	M. Malone (32)	M. Malone (13)	Bogues (7)	Capital Centre; 19,643	0–2
3	November 10, 1987; 8:30 p.m. CST	@ Milwaukee	L 100–115	J. Malone (18)	M. Malone (14)	Bogues (11)	MECCA Arena; 10,586	0–3
4	November 13	New York	W 108–101				Capital Centre	1–3
5	November 15	@ New Jersey	W 113–109				Brendan Byrne Arena	2–3
6	November 17, 1987; 8:30 p.m. EST	@ Chicago	L 101–105	J. Malone (26)	M. Malone (9)	Bogues (6)	Chicago Stadium; 17,081	2–4
7	November 18, 1987; 7:30 p.m. EST	Chicago	L 82–84	Williams (17)	Williams (14)	Bogues (6)	Capital Centre; 13,721	2–5
8	November 20	@ Portland	L 101–120				Memorial Coliseum	2–6
9	November 21	@ Seattle	L 103–124				Seattle Center Coliseum	2–7
10	November 24, 1987; 9:30 p.m. EST	@ Utah	L 83–100	M. Malone (17)	M. Malone (10)	Walker (4)	Salt Palace; 12,212	2–8
11	November 25	@ L.A. Clippers	W 101–96				Los Angeles Memorial Sports Arena	3–8
12	November 28, 1987; 7:30 p.m. EST	Detroit	W 124–102	Williams (21)	M. Malone (9)	Johnson (7)	Capital Centre; 13,028	4–8

December: 4–9 (home: 3–5; road: 1–4)

Game	Date	Team	Score	High points	High rebounds	High assists	Location Attendance	Record
13	December 2	@ Indiana	L 102–108				Market Square Arena	4–9
14	December 3, 1987; 7:30 p.m. EST	Atlanta	L 94–102	J. Malone (28)	M. Malone (15)	Bogues (7)	Capital Centre; 6,464	4–10
15	December 5	Seattle	L 99–115				Capital Centre	4–11
16	December 8	@ New York	L 92–116				Madison Square Garden	4–12
17	December 9, 1987; 7:30 p.m. EST	L.A. Lakers	W 120–112 (OT)	J. Malone (29)	Catledge (15)	Bogues (9)	Capital Centre; 18,643	5–12
18	December 11, 1987; 7:30 p.m. EST	@ Detroit	L 108–114	Catledge (26)	Bol, Catledge, M. Malone (8)	Bogues, Johnson, Walker (4)	Pontiac Silverdome; 17,884	5–13
19	December 12	@ New Jersey	W 122–107				Brendan Byrne Arena	6–13
20	December 15, 1987; 7:30 p.m. EST	Boston	L 102–122	M. Malone (21)	M. Malone (10)	Walker (5)	Capital Centre; 15,890	6–14
21	December 17	Indiana	W 115–111 (OT)				Capital Centre	7–14
22	December 19, 1987; 7:30 p.m. EST	Chicago	W 109–96	King (28)	M. Malone (9)	Johnson (11)	Capital Centre; 14,353	8–14
23	December 22, 1987; 7:30 p.m. EST	Cleveland	L 102–106	J. Malone (27)	M. Malone (12)	Johnson (9)	Capital Centre; 4,464	8–15
24	December 26, 1987; 9:00 p.m. EST	@ Milwaukee	L 97–102	King (24)	Bol (8)	J. Malone, Williams (5)	MECCA Arena; 11,052	8–16
25	December 30	Portland	L 112–117				Capital Centre	8–17

January: 9–6 (home: 8–2; road: 1–4)

Game	Date	Team	Score	High points	High rebounds	High assists	Location Attendance	Record
26	January 1, 1988; 8:00 p.m. EST	Denver	L 109–124	Catledge (27)	M. Malone (15)	Bogues (10)	Capital Centre; 5,326	8–18
27	January 2	Houston	L 100–111				Capital Centre	8–19
28	January 5	New Jersey	W 101–97				Capital Centre	9–19
29	January 8, 1988; 7:30 p.m. EST	@ Boston	L 109–125	J. Malone (31)	M. Malone (13)	Colter, J. Malone (5)	Boston Garden; 14,890	9–20
30	January 9	L.A. Clippers	W 108–76				Capital Centre	10–20
31	January 14, 1988; 7:30 p.m. EST	Milwaukee	W 136–107	M. Malone (36)	M. Malone (14)	Bogues (9)	Capital Centre; 8,316	11–20
32	January 17	Sacramento	W 130–113				Capital Centre	12–20
33	January 18, 1988; 8:30 p.m. EST	@ Chicago	L 103–117	King (25)	Catledge, M. Malone (8)	Colter (7)	Chicago Stadium; 17,767	12–21
34	January 20	@ Philadelphia	W 110–98				The Spectrum	13–21
35	January 22	Golden State	W 115–91				Capital Centre	14–21
36	January 24	Philadelphia	W 131–99				Capital Centre	15–21
37	January 25	Philadelphia	W 118–117 (OT)				Capital Centre	16–21
38	January 27, 1988; 7:30 p.m. EST	@ Boston	L 100–106	King (32)	M. Malone (11)	Bogues (5)	Boston Garden; 14,890	16–22
39	January 28	New York	W 104–90				Capital Centre	17–22
40	January 30, 1988; 7:30 p.m. EST	@ Cleveland	L 126–128 (OT)	Catledge (23)	Catledge (13)	Bogues (12)	Richfield Coliseum; 18,749	17–23

February: 5–9 (home: 1–2; road: 4–7)

Game	Date	Team	Score	High points	High rebounds	High assists	Location Attendance	Record
41	February 2	@ New York	L 106–110				Madison Square Garden	17–24
42	February 3, 1988; 7:30 p.m. EST	Cleveland	L 106–107	J. Malone (27)	M. Malone (13)	Colter, King (5)	Capital Centre; 6,806	17–25
All-Star Break
43	February 9	New Jersey	W 126–117 (OT)				Capital Centre	18–25
44	February 10, 1988; 7:30 p.m. EST	@ Cleveland	L 102–118	J. Malone (34)	Catledge (10)	J. Malone (7)	Richfield Coliseum; 9,179	18–26
45	February 13, 1988; 7:30 p.m. EST	@ Atlanta	L 103–105	J. Malone (29)	Williams (10)	Colter (5)	The Omni; 16,451	18–27
46	February 15, 1988; 1:00 p.m. EST	Milwaukee	L 110–114	Williams (28)	Williams (8)	Bogues (4)	Capital Centre; 9,564	18–28
47	February 17, 1988; 8:30 p.m. EST	@ Dallas	L 108–123	Williams (22)	Jones, M. Malone (10)	Catledge, Colter, King, J. Malone (4)	Reunion Arena; 17,007	18–29
48	February 19	@ San Antonio	W 106–102				HemisFair Arena	19–29
49	February 20	@ Houston	L 109–115				The Summit	19–30
50	February 22, 1988; 9:30 p.m. EST	@ Denver	L 87–100	Johnson, M. Malone (17)	M. Malone (13)	Johnson (6)	McNichols Sports Arena; 10,553	19–31
51	February 23, 1988; 10:30 p.m. EST	@ L.A. Lakers	L 100–111	J. Malone (26)	Jones (14)	Colter (8)	The Forum; 17,505	19–32
52	February 25	@ Sacramento	W 129–110				ARCO Arena	20–32
53	February 27	@ Phoenix	W 116–106				Arizona Veterans Memorial Coliseum	21–32
54	February 29	@ Golden State	W 110–105				Oakland–Alameda County Coliseum Arena	22–32

March: 8–7 (home: 7–3; road: 1–4)

Game	Date	Team	Score	High points	High rebounds	High assists	Location Attendance	Record
55	March 2	Indiana	W 111–102				Capital Centre	23–32
56	March 4	@ Indiana	W 95–88				Market Square Arena	24–32
57	March 5, 1988; 7:30 p.m. EST	Detroit	W 101–97	J. Malone, M. Malone (21)	M. Malone (13)	Bogues (6)	Capital Centre; 15,656	25–32
58	March 9	Phoenix	W 115–111				Capital Centre	26–32
59	March 11, 1988; 8:00 p.m. EST	Utah	L 107–109	J. Malone (31)	M. Malone (17)	Colter, Williams (5)	Capital Centre; 10,775	26–33
60	March 13	@ Philadelphia	L 96–104				The Spectrum	26–34
61	March 14	San Antonio	W 112–106				Capital Centre	27–34
62	March 16, 1988; 7:30 p.m. EST	Chicago	W 106–103	J. Malone, Williams (28)	M. Malone (13)	Colter (8)	Capital Centre; 16,515	28–34
63	March 17	@ Indiana	L 95–99				Market Square Arena	28–35
64	March 19	Philadelphia	L 89–94				Capital Centre	28–36
65	March 20, 1988; 7:00 p.m. EST	@ Detroit	L 110–118	J. Malone (39)	M. Malone (11)	Colter (8)	Pontiac Silverdome; 22,075	28–37
66	March 23, 1988; 7:30 p.m. EST	@ Boston	L 89–104	Williams (27)	M. Malone (8)	Bogues (8)	Boston Garden; 14,890	28–38
67	March 24, 1988; 7:30 p.m. EST	Atlanta	W 94–91	J. Malone (21)	M. Malone (11)	J. Malone (5)	Capital Centre; 13,629	29–38
68	March 26	New Jersey	W 99–88				Capital Centre	30–38
69	March 30, 1988; 7:30 p.m. EST	Cleveland	L 96–107	J. Malone (20)	M. Malone (15)	Bogues, Colter, Williams (5)	Capital Centre; 8,387	30–39

April: 7–5 (home: 3–2; road: 4–3)

Game	Date	Team	Score	High points	High rebounds	High assists	Location Attendance	Record
70	April 1, 1988; 8:00 p.m. EST	Dallas	W 118–103	M. Malone (27)	M. Malone (9)	Bogues (7)	Capital Centre; 13,783	31–39
71	April 3	@ New Jersey	W 105–103				Brendan Byrne Arena	32–39
72	April 5, 1988; 8:30 p.m. EDT	@ Chicago	W 105–94	Williams (23)	M. Malone (13)	Bogues (12)	Chicago Stadium; 17,773	33–39
73	April 6, 1988; 7:30 p.m. EDT	@ Cleveland	L 87–98	Colter (29)	Jones (8)	Williams (5)	Richfield Coliseum; 10,165	33–40
74	April 8	Indiana	W 107–100				Capital Centre	34–40
75	April 10	New York	L 98–118				Capital Centre	35–40
76	April 11, 1988; 7:30 p.m. EDT	@ Atlanta	W 86–85	Walker (19)	Williams (14)	J. Malone (9)	The Omni; 10,473	35–41
77	April 13	@ Philadelphia	L 97–98 (OT)				The Spectrum	35–42
78	April 15	@ New York	W 106–97				Madison Square Garden	36–42
79	April 17, 1988; 3:30 p.m. EDT	Boston	W 98–92	M. Malone (24)	M. Malone (14)	Walker (7)	Capital Centre; 18,643	37–42
80	April 20, 1988; 8:30 p.m. EDT	@ Milwaukee	L 94–132	Alarie, King (14)	Bol (8)	Bogues (9)	MECCA Arena; 11,052	37–43
81	April 21, 1988; 7:30 p.m. EDT	Detroit	L 87–99	M. Malone (23)	M. Malone (11)	Walker (7)	Capital Centre; 11,713	37–44
82	April 23, 1988; 7:30 p.m. EDT	Atlanta	W 106–96	J. Malone, M. Malone (24)	Jones, M. Malone (7)	J. Malone (7)	Capital Centre; 15,638	38–44

1987–88 schedule

== Playoffs ==
1988 playoff game log
Eastern Conference First Round: 2–3 (home: 2–0; road: 0–3)

Game	Date	Team	Score	High points	High rebounds	High assists	Location Attendance	Series
1	April 28, 1988; 7:30 p.m. EDT	@ Detroit	L 87–96	J. Malone (33)	M. Malone (13)	Williams (9)	Pontiac Silverdome; 17,356	0–1
2	April 30, 1988; 8:00 p.m. EDT	@ Detroit	L 101–102	J. Malone (31)	M. Malone (14)	J. Malone (4)	Pontiac Silverdome; 18,293	0–2
3	May 2, 1988; 8:00 p.m. EDT	Detroit	W 114–106 (OT)	J. Malone (35)	M. Malone (9)	Colter (6)	Capital Centre; 9,673	1–2
4	May 4, 1988; 8:00 p.m. EDT	Detroit	W 106–103	J. Malone (25)	M. Malone (8)	Walker (5)	Capital Centre; 10,513	2–2
5	May 8, 1988; 3:30 p.m. EDT	@ Detroit	L 78–99	KIng (18)	M. Malone (12)	M. Malone, Walker, Williams (3)	Pontiac Silverdome; 18,403	2–3

1988 schedule

== Player statistics ==
Legend
GP	Games played	GS	Games started	MPG	Minutes per game
FG%	Field-goal percentage	3P%	3-point field-goal percentage	FT%	Free-throw percentage
RPG	Rebounds per game	APG	Assists per game	SPG	Steals per game
BPG	Blocks per game	PPG	Points per game

== See also ==
- 1987-88 NBA season
