= 1987–88 Portland Trail Blazers season =

NBA professional basketball team season

- Head coach: Mike Schuler
- General manager: Jon Spoelstra
- Owner: Larry Weinberg
- Arena: Memorial Coliseum

Results
- Record: 53–29 (.646)
- Place: Division: 2nd (Pacific); Conference: 4th (Western)
- Playoff finish: First round (lost to Jazz 1–3)
- Stats at Basketball Reference

The 1987–88 Portland Trail Blazers season was the 18th season for the Portland Trail Blazers in the National Basketball Association.

== Season summary ==
=== Off-season ===
During the first month of the regular season in November, the Trail Blazers signed free agent, former Trail Blazers and All-Star forward Maurice Lucas, and later on in December signed Richard Anderson, who was previously released by the Houston Rockets. After only playing just five games the previous season, Sam Bowie suffered a preseason right leg injury, and would miss the entire season.

=== Regular season ===
After winning their first two games of the regular season, the Trail Blazers posted a five-game losing streak, but then posted a nine-game winning streak between November and December, and later on held a 26–16 record at the All-Star break. At mid-season, the team traded Jim Paxson to the Boston Celtics in exchange for Jerry Sichting. The Trail Blazers posted another nine-game winning streak between February and March, and won 10 of their final 13 games of the season, finishing in second place in the Pacific Division with a 53–29 record, earning the fourth seed in the Western Conference; the team qualified for the NBA playoffs for the sixth consecutive year.

Clyde Drexler averaged 27.0 points, 6.6 rebounds, 5.8 assists and 2.9 steals per game, and was named to the All-NBA Second Team. In addition, Kiki Vandeweghe played a sixth man role off the bench, and contributed 20.2 points per game, but only played just 37 games due to a back injury, and Jerome Kersey, who replaced Vandeweghe as the team's starting small forward, provided the team with 19.2 points, 8.3 rebounds and 1.6 steals per game. Meanwhile, second-year center Kevin Duckworth averaged 15.8 points and 7.4 rebounds per game, and was named the NBA Most Improved Player of the Year, Steve Johnson provided with 15.4 points and 6.3 rebounds per game, but only appeared in just 43 games due to a sore right thumb, and ankle injuries, and Terry Porter contributed 14.9 points, 10.1 assists and 1.8 steals per game. Off the bench, Anderson averaged 6.7 points and 4.6 rebounds per game, while Lucas provided with 6.1 points and 4.3 rebounds per game, Mike Holton contributed 5.3 points and 2.6 assists per game, and starting power forward Caldwell Jones averaged 4.2 points, 5.2 rebounds and 1.3 blocks per game.

During the NBA All-Star weekend at the Chicago Stadium in Chicago, Illinois, Drexler and Johnson were both selected for the 1988 NBA All-Star Game, as members of the Western Conference All-Star team, although Johnson did not participate due to injury; it was his final All-Star selection. In addition, Drexler and Kersey both participated in the NBA Slam Dunk Contest; it was the fourth appearance for Drexler, and the third appearance for Kersey. Drexler finished in fifth place in Most Valuable Player voting, and also finished tied in eighth place in Defensive Player of the Year voting, while Kersey finished in fifth place in Most Improved Player voting, and head coach Mike Schuler finished tied in third place in Coach of the Year voting.

The Trail Blazers finished tenth in the NBA in home-game attendance, with an attendance of 519,306 at the Memorial Coliseum during the regular season.

=== NBA playoffs ===
In the Western Conference First Round of the 1988 NBA playoffs, the Trail Blazers faced off against the 5th–seeded Utah Jazz, who were led by the trio of All-Star forward Karl Malone, sixth man Thurl Bailey, and John Stockton. The Trail Blazers won Game 1 over the Jazz at home, 108–96 at the Memorial Coliseum. However, the team lost the next three games, which included a Game 4 loss to the Jazz on the road, 111–96 at the Salt Palace, thus losing the series in four games; it was the third consecutive year that the Trail Blazers lost in the opening round of the NBA playoffs.

=== Aftermath ===
Following the season, Lucas retired, and Holton was left unprotected in the 1988 NBA expansion draft, where he was selected by the Charlotte Hornets expansion team.

== Draft picks ==
| Round | Pick | Player | Position | Nationality | School/Club team |
|---|---|---|---|---|---|
| 1 | 17 | Ronnie Murphy | F | United States | Jacksonville |
| 2 | 29 | Lester Fonville | | United States | Jackson State |
| 2 | 30 | Nikita Wilson | PF | United States | Louisiana State |
| 3 | 63 | Kevin Gamble | SF/SG | United States | Iowa |
| 4 | 86 | Norwood Barber | | United States | Florida State |
| 5 | 109 | David Moss | | United States | Tulsa |
| 6 | 132 | Bernard Jackson | | United States | Loyola (IL) |
| 7 | 155 | Kenny Stone | | United States | George Fox |

== Roster ==
1987–88 Portland Trail Blazers roster
Players

| Pos. | No. | Player | Height | Weight | DOB | From |
|---|---|---|---|---|---|---|
| F | 35 | Richard Anderson | 6 ft 10 in (2.08 m) | 240 lb (109 kg) | 1960–11–19 | California |
| C | 31 | Sam Bowie (injured) (IN) | 7 ft 1 in (2.16 m) | 235 lb (107 kg) | 1961–03–17 | Kentucky |
| G | 22 | Clyde Drexler | 6 ft 7 in (2.01 m) | 210 lb (95 kg) | 1962–06–22 | Houston |
| C | 00 | Kevin Duckworth | 7 ft 0 in (2.13 m) | 275 lb (125 kg) | 1964–04–01 | Eastern Illinois |
| G | 6 | Mike Holton | 6 ft 4 in (1.93 m) | 185 lb (84 kg) | 1961–08–04 | UCLA |
| C | 33 | Steve Johnson | 6 ft 11 in (2.11 m) | 235 lb (107 kg) | 1957–11–03 | Oregon State |
| C | 27 | Caldwell Jones | 6 ft 11 in (2.11 m) | 217 lb (98 kg) | 1950–08–04 | Albany State |
| F | 25 | Jerome Kersey | 6 ft 7 in (2.01 m) | 215 lb (98 kg) | 1962–06–26 | Longwood |
| F | 20 | Maurice Lucas | 6 ft 9 in (2.06 m) | 215 lb (98 kg) | 1952–02–18 | Marquette |
| G | 4 | Jim Paxson | 6 ft 6 in (1.98 m) | 200 lb (91 kg) | 1957–07–09 | Dayton |
| G | 30 | Terry Porter | 6 ft 3 in (1.91 m) | 195 lb (88 kg) | 1963–04–08 | Wisconsin |
| G | 14 | Jerry Sichting | 6 ft 1 in (1.85 m) | 168 lb (76 kg) | 1956–11–29 | Purdue |
| F | 55 | Kiki Vandeweghe | 6 ft 8 in (2.03 m) | 220 lb (100 kg) | 1958–08–01 | UCLA |

Coaches
Head coach
- Mike Schuler
Assistant(s)
- Rick Adelman
- Jack Schalow

Legend
- (DP) Unsigned draft pick
- (FA) Free agent
- (S) Suspended
- Injured

Roster
Updated: February 23, 1988

=== Roster notes ===
- Center Sam Bowie was on the injured reserve list due to a right leg injury sustained during the preseason, and missed the entire regular season.

== Regular season ==
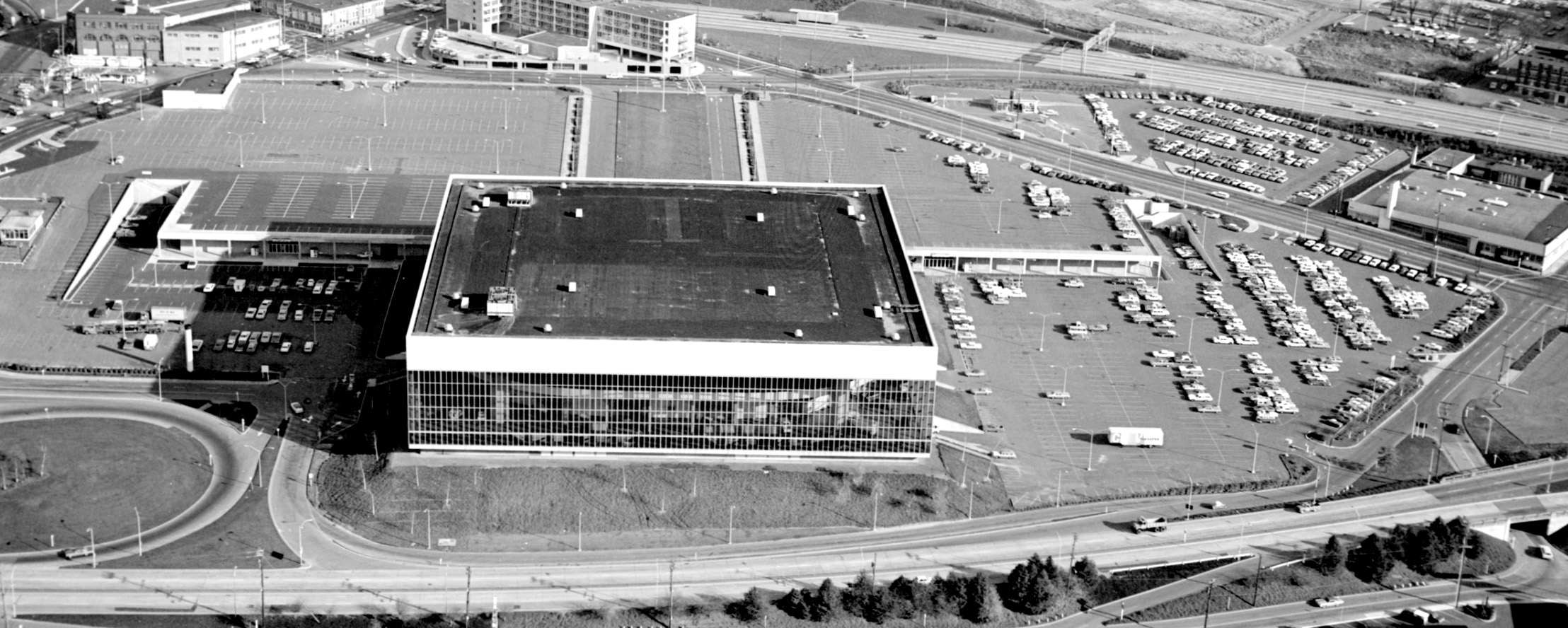
The Trail Blazers played their home games at Veterans Memorial Coliseum.

=== Season standings ===
| Pacific Division | W | L | PCT | GB | Home | Road | Div |
|---|---|---|---|---|---|---|---|
| y-Los Angeles Lakers | 62 | 20 | .756 | – | 36–5 | 26–15 | 23–7 |
| x-Portland Trail Blazers | 53 | 29 | .646 | 9 | 33–8 | 20–21 | 23–7 |
| x-Seattle SuperSonics | 44 | 38 | .537 | 18 | 32–9 | 12–29 | 19–11 |
| Phoenix Suns | 28 | 54 | .341 | 34 | 22–19 | 6–35 | 11–19 |
| Golden State Warriors | 20 | 62 | .244 | 42 | 16–25 | 4–37 | 7–23 |
| Los Angeles Clippers | 17 | 65 | .207 | 45 | 14–27 | 3–38 | 7–23 |

| # | Western Conference | | | | |
| # | Team | W | L | PCT | GB |
|---|---|---|---|---|---|
| 1 | z-Los Angeles Lakers | 62 | 20 | .756 | – |
| 2 | y-Denver Nuggets | 54 | 28 | .659 | 8 |
| 3 | x-Dallas Mavericks | 53 | 29 | .646 | 9 |
| 4 | x-Portland Trail Blazers | 53 | 29 | .646 | 9 |
| 5 | x-Utah Jazz | 47 | 35 | .573 | 15 |
| 6 | x-Houston Rockets | 46 | 36 | .561 | 16 |
| 7 | x-Seattle SuperSonics | 44 | 38 | .537 | 18 |
| 8 | x-San Antonio Spurs | 31 | 51 | .378 | 31 |
| 9 | Phoenix Suns | 28 | 54 | .341 | 34 |
| 10 | Sacramento Kings | 24 | 58 | .293 | 38 |
| 11 | Golden State Warriors | 20 | 62 | .244 | 42 |
| 12 | Los Angeles Clippers | 17 | 65 | .207 | 45 |

z - clinched division title
y - clinched division title
x - clinched playoff spot

== Game log ==
=== Regular season ===
1987–88 game log
Total: 53–29 (home: 33–8; road: 20–21)
November: 7–5 (home: 6–1; road: 1–4)

| Game | Date | Team | Score | High points | High rebounds | High assists | Location Attendance | Record |
|---|---|---|---|---|---|---|---|---|
| 1 | November 6 | Phoenix | W 118–104 | | | | Memorial Coliseum | 1–0 |
| 2 | November 7 | @ L.A. Clippers | W 124–99 | | | | Los Angeles Memorial Sports Arena | 2–0 |
| 3 | November 10 | Houston | L 111–118 | | | | Memorial Coliseum | 2–1 |
| 4 | November 12 | @ Denver | L 113–126 | | | | McNichols Sports Arena | 2–2 |
| 5 | November 14 | @ Dallas | L 116–127 | | | | Reunion Arena | 2–3 |
| 6 | November 17; 7:30 p.m. PST | @ L.A. Lakers | L 115–142 | VanDeWeghe (24) | Kersey (9) | Lucas, Porter (5) | The Forum; 16,347 | 2–4 |
| 7 | November 18 | @ Seattle | L 114–120 | | | | Seattle Center Coliseum | 2–5 |
| 8 | November 20 | Washington | W 120–101 | | | | Memorial Coliseum | 3–5 |
| 9 | November 22 | Indiana | W 120–110 | | | | Memorial Coliseum | 4–5 |
| 10 | November 24 | Sacramento | W 98–94 | | | | Memorial Coliseum | 5–5 |
| 11 | November 27 | L.A. Clippers | W 97–87 | | | | Memorial Coliseum | 6–5 |
| 12 | November 29 | New Jersey | W 125–104 | | | | Memorial Coliseum | 7–5 |

December: 10–5 (home: 5–0; road: 5–5)

| Game | Date | Team | Score | High points | High rebounds | High assists | Location Attendance | Record |
|---|---|---|---|---|---|---|---|---|
| 13 | December 1 | Phoenix | W 102–100 | | | | Memorial Coliseum | 8–5 |
| 14 | December 2, 1987; 7:30 pm PST | @ L.A. Lakers | W 117–104 | | | | The Forum; 17,505 | 9–5 |
| 15 | December 5 | @ Phoenix | W 133–115 | | | | Arizona Veterans Memorial Coliseum | 10–5 |
| 16 | December 6 | New York | W 117–99 | | | | Memorial Coliseum | 11–5 |
| 17 | December 8, 1987; 4:30 pm PST | @ Detroit | L 117–127 | | | | Pontiac Silverdome; 17,126 | 11–6 |
| 18 | December 9 | @ Philadelphia | L 86–94 | | | | The Spectrum | 11–7 |
| 19 | December 11 | @ Milwaukee | L 112–125 | | | | MECCA Arena | 11–8 |
| 20 | December 12 | @ Indiana | W 108–101 | | | | Market Square Arena | 12–8 |
| 21 | December 15 | Seattle | W 128–109 | | | | Memorial Coliseum | 13–8 |
| 22 | December 18 | @ Phoenix | W 129–114 | | | | Arizona Veterans Memorial Coliseum | 14–8 |
| 23 | December 20 | San Antonio | W 148–126 | | | | Memorial Coliseum | 15–8 |
| 24 | December 22 | Golden State | W 136–91 | | | | Memorial Coliseum | 16–8 |
| 25 | December 26 | @ Cleveland | L 117–120 | | | | Richfield Coliseum | 16–9 |
| 26 | December 29 | @ New York | L 110–123 | | | | Madison Square Garden | 16–10 |
| 27 | December 30 | @ Washington | W 117–112 | | | | Capital Centre | 17–10 |

January: 8–5 (home: 7–2; road: 1–3)

| Game | Date | Team | Score | High points | High rebounds | High assists | Location Attendance | Record |
|---|---|---|---|---|---|---|---|---|
| 28 | January 1 | Philadelphia | W 127–125 | | | | Memorial Coliseum | 18–10 |
| 29 | January 3, 1988; 5:00 pm PST | L.A. Lakers | L 81–98 | | | | Memorial Coliseum; 12,666 | 18–11 |
| 30 | January 5 | Seattle | W 126–114 | | | | Memorial Coliseum | 19–11 |
| 31 | January 8 | Sacramento | W 98–91 | | | | Memorial Coliseum | 20–11 |
| 32 | January 13 | @ Utah | L 104–116 | | | | Salt Palace | 20–12 |
| 33 | January 14 | @ Houston | L 98–103 | | | | The Summit | 20–13 |
| 34 | January 16 | @ San Antonio | W 121–120 | | | | HemisFair Arena | 21–13 |
| 35 | January 19 | Dallas | L 116–120 | | | | Memorial Coliseum | 21–14 |
| 36 | January 22 | Denver | W 126–106 | | | | Memorial Coliseum | 22–14 |
| 37 | January 24, 1988; 7:00 pm PST | Detroit | W 119–111 | | | | Memorial Coliseum; 12,666 | 23–14 |
| 38 | January 26 | Milwaukee | W 112–106 | | | | Memorial Coliseum | 24–14 |
| 39 | January 27 | @ Golden State | L 110–115 | | | | Oakland–Alameda County Coliseum Arena | 24–15 |
| 40 | January 29 | Phoenix | W 128–119 | | | | Memorial Coliseum | 25–15 |

February: 9–6 (home: 5–3; road: 4–3)

| Game | Date | Team | Score | High points | High rebounds | High assists | Location Attendance | Record |
|---|---|---|---|---|---|---|---|---|
| 41 | February 2 | Atlanta | W 121–118 | | | | Memorial Coliseum | 26–15 |
| 42 | February 4 | Utah | L 123–126 | | | | Memorial Coliseum | 26–16 |
| 43 | February 9 | Seattle | W 139–123 | | | | Memorial Coliseum | 27–16 |
| 44 | February 11 | @ Sacramento | L 113–123 | | | | ARCO Arena | 27–17 |
| 45 | February 12 | Denver | W 120–105 | | | | Memorial Coliseum | 28–17 |
| 46 | February 14 | Houston | L 103–115 | | | | Memorial Coliseum | 28–18 |
| 47 | February 15 | @ Utah | L 94–112 | | | | Salt Palace | 28–19 |
| 48 | February 17 | @ L.A. Clippers | W 110–96 | | | | Los Angeles Memorial Sports Arena | 29–19 |
| 49 | February 19 | Boston | L 104–124 | | | | Memorial Coliseum | 29–20 |
| 50 | February 21 | San Antonio | W 117–112 | | | | Memorial Coliseum | 30–20 |
| 51 | February 23 | @ New Jersey | W 114–102 | | | | Brendan Byrne Arena | 31–20 |
| 52 | February 24 | @ Boston | L 112–113 | | | | Boston Garden | 31–21 |
| 53 | February 26 | @ Chicago | W 104–96 | | | | Chicago Stadium | 32–21 |
| 54 | February 27 | @ Atlanta | W 123–120 | | | | The Omni | 33–21 |
| 55 | February 29 | Cleveland | W 107–94 | | | | Memorial Coliseum | 34–21 |

March: 9–4 (home: 4–0; road: 5–4)

| Game | Date | Team | Score | High points | High rebounds | High assists | Location Attendance | Record |
|---|---|---|---|---|---|---|---|---|
| 56 | March 3 | @ Phoenix | W 135–112 | | | | Arizona Veterans Memorial Coliseum | 35–21 |
| 57 | March 5 | Golden State | W 123–117 | | | | Memorial Coliseum | 36–21 |
| 58 | March 8 | @ Dallas | W 112–110 | | | | Reunion Arena | 37–21 |
| 59 | March 10 | @ Houston | W 112–109 | | | | The Summit | 38–21 |
| 60 | March 13 | L.A. Clippers | W 121–100 | | | | Memorial Coliseum | 39–21 |
| 61 | March 15, 1988; 7:30 pm PST | L.A. Lakers | W 112–95 | | | | Memorial Coliseum | 40–21 |
| 62 | March 17 | @ Denver | L 115–116 (OT) | | | | McNichols Sports Arena | 40–22 |
| 63 | March 18 | @ Golden State | W 121–116 | | | | Oakland–Alameda County Coliseum Arena | 41–22 |
| 64 | March 20 | Dallas | W 105–99 | | | | Memorial Coliseum | 42–22 |
| 65 | March 23 | @ Seattle | L 108–118 | | | | Seattle Center Coliseum | 42–23 |
| 66 | March 25 | @ Dallas | L 101–106 | | | | Reunion Arena | 42–24 |
| 67 | March 26 | @ Houston | L 109–115 | | | | The Summit | 42–25 |
| 68 | March 29 | @ San Antonio | W 136–113 | | | | HemisFair Arena | 43–25 |

April: 10–4 (home: 6–2; road: 4–2)

| Game | Date | Team | Score | High points | High rebounds | High assists | Location Attendance | Record |
|---|---|---|---|---|---|---|---|---|
| 69 | April 1 | Chicago | L 101–116 | | | | Memorial Coliseum | 43–26 |
| 70 | April 3 | San Antonio | W 110–107 | | | | Memorial Coliseum | 44–26 |
| 71 | April 5 | L.A. Clippers | W 141–119 | | | | Memorial Coliseum | 45–26 |
| 72 | April 6 | @ L.A. Clippers | W 111–103 | | | | Los Angeles Memorial Sports Arena | 46–26 |
| 73 | April 8 | @ Seattle | L 100–114 | | | | Seattle Center Coliseum | 46–27 |
| 74 | April 9, 1988; 7:30 pm PDT | L.A. Lakers | W 119–109 | | | | Memorial Coliseum; 12,666 | 47–27 |
| 75 | April 12, 1988; 7:30 pm PDT | @ L.A. Lakers | L 103–109 | | | | The Forum; 17,505 | 47–28 |
| 76 | April 14 | @ Utah | W 128–123 | | | | Salt Palace | 48–28 |
| 77 | April 15 | Golden State | W 147–113 | | | | Memorial Coliseum | 49–28 |
| 78 | April 17 | Sacramento | W 112–102 | | | | Memorial Coliseum | 50–28 |
| 79 | April 19 | Utah | L 122–129 | | | | Memorial Coliseum | 50–29 |
| 80 | April 20 | @ Golden State | W 131–117 | | | | Oakland–Alameda County Coliseum Arena | 51–29 |
| 81 | April 22 | Denver | W 141–135 (OT) | | | | Memorial Coliseum | 52–29 |
| 82 | April 23 | @ Sacramento | W 124–110 | | | | ARCO Arena | 53–29 |

1987–88 schedule

=== Playoffs ===
1988 playoff game log
First round: 1–3 (home: 1–1; road: 0–2)

| Game | Date | Team | Score | High points | High rebounds | High assists | Location Attendance | Series |
|---|---|---|---|---|---|---|---|---|
| 1 | April 28 | Utah | W 108–96 | Clyde Drexler (26) | Clyde Drexler (13) | Terry Porter (12) | Memorial Coliseum; 12,666 | 1–0 |
| 2 | April 30 | Utah | L 105–114 | Clyde Drexler (25) | Maurice Lucas (14) | Terry Porter (7) | Memorial Coliseum; 12,666 | 1–1 |
| 3 | May 4 | @ Utah | L 108–113 | Jerome Kersey (23) | Kevin Duckworth (16) | Drexler, Porter (4) | Salt Palace; 12,444 | 1–2 |
| 4 | May 6 | @ Utah | L 96–111 | Kevin Duckworth (33) | Kersey, Duckworth (10) | Clyde Drexler (6) | Salt Palace; 12,444 | 1–3 |

1988 schedule

== Player statistics ==
Legend
| GP | Games played | GS | Games started | MPG | Minutes per game |
| FG% | Field-goal percentage | 3P% | 3-point field-goal percentage | FT% | Free-throw percentage |
| RPG | Rebounds per game | APG | Assists per game | SPG | Steals per game |
| BPG | Blocks per game | PPG | Points per game |

== Awards and honors ==
- Clyde Drexler, All-NBA Second Team
- Kevin Duckworth, NBA Most Improved Player
