= 1987–88 Dallas Mavericks season =

NBA professional basketball team season

- Head coach: John MacLeod
- General manager: Norm Sonju
- Owner: Don Carter
- Arena: Reunion Arena

Results
- Record: 53–29 (.646)
- Place: Division: 2nd (Midwest); Conference: 3rd (Western)
- Playoff finish: Western Conference finals (lost to Lakers 3–4)
- Stats at Basketball Reference

Local media
- Television: KTVT (Allen Stone, Dave Barnett); Home Sports Entertainment (Allen Stone, Norm Hitzges)
- Radio: WBAP (Allen Stone, Dave Barnett)

The 1987–88 Dallas Mavericks season was the eighth season for the Dallas Mavericks in the National Basketball Association.

== Season summary ==
=== Off-season ===
After the resignation of Dick Motta, the Mavericks hired John MacLeod as their new head coach.

=== Regular season ===
Under MacLeod, the Mavericks got off to an 18–8 start to the regular season, then posted a seven-game winning streak in January, and later on held a 28–15 record at the All-Star break. The team then posted an 11-game winning streak between February and March, and finished in second place in the Midwest Division with a 53–29 record, earning the third seed in the Western Conference.

Mark Aguirre averaged 25.1 points, 5.6 rebounds and 3.6 assists per game, while Rolando Blackman averaged 18.7 points and 3.7 assists per game, and Derek Harper provided the team with 17.0 points, 7.7 assists and 2.0 steals per game. In addition, Sam Perkins contributed 14.2 points and 8.0 rebounds per game, while second-year forward Roy Tarpley provided with 13.5 points and 11.8 rebounds per game off the bench, and was named the NBA Sixth Man of the Year, and James Donaldson averaged 7.0 points, 9.3 rebounds and 1.3 blocks per game. Also off the bench, Detlef Schrempf contributed 8.5 points and 3.4 rebounds per game, and Brad Davis provided with 7.2 points and 4.0 assists per game.

During the NBA All-Star weekend at the Chicago Stadium in Chicago, Illinois, Aguirre and Donaldson were both selected for the 1988 NBA All-Star Game, as members of the Western Conference All-Star team; it was Donaldson's first and only All-Star appearance. Meanwhile, Schrempf participated in the NBA Three-Point Shootout for the second consecutive year, despite only making 5 out of 32 three-point field-goal attempts, while shooting .156 in three-point field-goal percentage during the regular season. Aguirre finished tied in 14th place in Most Valuable Player voting, while Perkins finished tied in eighth place in Defensive Player of the Year voting, and Tarpley finished tied in eighth place in Most Improved Player voting.

The Mavericks finished fourth in the NBA in home-game attendance, with an attendance of 695,592 at the Reunion Arena during the regular season.

=== NBA playoffs ===
In the Western Conference First Round of the 1988 NBA playoffs, the Mavericks faced off against the 6th–seeded Houston Rockets, a team that featured All-Star center Akeem Olajuwon, All-Star guard Sleepy Floyd, and Rodney McCray. The Mavericks won Game 1 over the Rockets at home, 120–110 at the Reunion Arena, but then lost Game 2 at home by a score of 119–108, as the Rockets evened the series. The Mavericks won the next two games on the road, which included a Game 4 win over the Rockets at The Summit, 107–97 to win the series in four games.

In the Western Conference Semi-finals, the team faced off against the 2nd–seeded, and Midwest Division champion Denver Nuggets, who were led by the trio of All-Star forward Alex English, All-Star guard Fat Lever, and sixth man Jay Vincent. The Mavericks lost Game 1 to the Nuggets on the road, 126–115 at the McNichols Sports Arena, but managed to win Game 2 on the road, 112–108 to even the series. The Mavericks lost Game 3 to the Nuggets at the Reunion Arena, 107–105, as the Nuggets took a 2–1 series lead. However, the Mavericks managed to win the next three games, including a Game 6 home win over the Nuggets at the Reunion Arena, 108–95 to win the series in six games, and advance to the Conference Finals for the first time in franchise history.

In the Western Conference Finals, the Mavericks then faced off against the top–seeded, and defending NBA champion Los Angeles Lakers, who won the Pacific Division title, and were led by the quartet of All-Star guard Magic Johnson, All-Star forward James Worthy, Byron Scott and All-Star center Kareem Abdul-Jabbar. The Mavericks lost the first two games to the Lakers on the road at the Great Western Forum, but managed to win their next two home games, including a Game 4 win over the Lakers at the Reunion Arena, 118–104. After losing Game 5 at the Great Western Forum, 119–102, the Mavericks won Game 6 over the Lakers at the Reunion Arena, 105–103 to even the series. However, the Mavericks lost Game 7 to the Lakers at the Great Western Forum, 117–102, thus losing in a hard-fought seven-game series.

The Lakers would defeat the Detroit Pistons in a full seven-game series in the 1988 NBA Finals, winning their second consecutive NBA championship.

=== Aftermath ===
The Mavericks would not win 50 games during the regular season again until the 2000–01 season, nor would they advance to the Western Conference Finals again until the 2002–03 season.

== NBA draft ==
Round	Pick	Player	Position	Nationality	College
1	20	Jim Farmer	Guard	United States	Alabama
2	26	Steve Alford	Guard	United States	Indiana
3	66	Mike Richmond	Forward	United States	UTEP
4	89	David Johnson	Forward	United States	Oklahoma
5	112	Sam Hill	Center	United States	Iowa State
6	135	Quintan Gates	Forward	United States	UTEP
7	158	Gerald White	Guard	United States	Auburn

== Roster ==
1987–88 Dallas Mavericks roster
Players

Pos.	No.	Player	Height	Weight	DOB	From
F	24	Mark Aguirre	6 ft 6 in (1.98 m)	232 lb (105 kg)	1959–12–10	DePaul
G	2	Steve Alford	6 ft 2 in (1.88 m)	183 lb (83 kg)	1964–11–23	Indiana
C	33	Uwe Blab	7 ft 1 in (2.16 m)	252 lb (114 kg)	1962–03–26	Indiana
G/F	22	Rolando Blackman	6 ft 6 in (1.98 m)	190 lb (86 kg)	1959–02–26	Kansas State
G	15	Brad Davis	6 ft 3 in (1.91 m)	180 lb (82 kg)	1955–12–17	Maryland
C	40	James Donaldson	7 ft 2 in (2.18 m)	275 lb (125 kg)	1957–08–16	Washington State
G	21	Jim Farmer	6 ft 4 in (1.93 m)	190 lb (86 kg)	1964–09–23	Alabama
G	12	Derek Harper	6 ft 4 in (1.93 m)	185 lb (84 kg)	1961–10–13	Illinois
F/C	44	Sam Perkins	6 ft 9 in (2.06 m)	235 lb (107 kg)	1961–06–14	North Carolina
F	32	Detlef Schrempf	6 ft 9 in (2.06 m)	214 lb (97 kg)	1963–01–21	Washington
F/C	42	Roy Tarpley	6 ft 11 in (2.11 m)	230 lb (104 kg)	1964–11–28	Michigan
C	23	Bill Wennington	7 ft 0 in (2.13 m)	245 lb (111 kg)	1963–04–26	St. John's

Coaches
Head coach
- John MacLeod
Assistant(s)
- Richie Adubato
- Garfield Heard
- Clifford Ray

Legend
- (DP) Unsigned draft pick
- (FA) Free agent
- (S) Suspended
- Injured

== Regular season ==
=== Standings ===
Midwest Division	W	L	PCT	GB	Home	Road	Div
y-Denver Nuggets	54	28	.659	–	35–6	19–22	18–12
x-Dallas Mavericks	53	29	.646	1	33–8	20–21	20–10
x-Utah Jazz	47	35	.573	7	33–8	14–27	18–12
x-Houston Rockets	46	36	.561	8	31–10	15–26	13–17
x-San Antonio Spurs	31	51	.378	23	23–18	8–33	12–18
Sacramento Kings	24	58	.293	30	19–22	5–36	9–21

#	Western Conference				
#	Team	W	L	PCT	GB
1	z-Los Angeles Lakers	62	20	.756	–
2	y-Denver Nuggets	54	28	.659	8
3	x-Dallas Mavericks	53	29	.646	9
4	x-Portland Trail Blazers	53	29	.646	9
5	x-Utah Jazz	47	35	.573	15
6	x-Houston Rockets	46	36	.561	16
7	x-Seattle SuperSonics	44	38	.537	18
8	x-San Antonio Spurs	31	51	.378	31
9	Phoenix Suns	28	54	.341	34
10	Sacramento Kings	24	58	.293	38
11	Golden State Warriors	20	62	.244	42
12	Los Angeles Clippers	17	65	.207	45

=== Record vs. opponents ===
==== vs. Eastern Conference ====
vs. Atlantic Division

1987–88 NBA records
Team	BOS	NJN	NYK	PHI	WSB	Total
Dallas	0–2	1–1	1–1	1–1	1–1	4–6
Denver	2–0	2–0	1–1	2–0	2–0	9–1
Houston	1–1	1–1	1–1	1–1	2–0	6–4
Sacramento	0–2	1–1	1–1	1–1	0–2	3–7
San Antonio	0–2	1–1	1–1	1–1	0–2	3–7
Utah	0–2	1–1	1–1	0–2	2–0	4–6

vs. Central Division

1987–88 NBA records
Team	ATL	CHI	CLE	DET	IND	MIL	Total
Dallas	0–2	2–0	1–1	1–1	2–0	2–0	8–4
Denver	1–1	1–1	1–1	1–1	1–1	1–1	6–6
Houston	1–1	0–2	1–1	1–1	2–0	2–0	7–5
Sacramento	1–1	1–1	0–2	0–2	0–2	0–2	2–10
San Antonio	0–2	1–1	0–2	1–1	0–2	1–1	3–9
Utah	1–1	0–2	2–0	0–2	1–1	1–1	5–7

==== vs. Western Conference ====
vs. Midwest Division

1987–88 NBA records
Team	DAL	DEN	HOU	SAC	SAS	UTA	Total
Dallas	—	3–3	4–2	5–1	5–1	3–3	20–10
Denver	3–3	—	4–2	4–2	5–1	2–4	18–12
Houston	2–4	2–4	—	4–2	2–4	3–3	13–17
Sacramento	1–5	2–4	2–4	—	3–3	1–5	9–21
San Antonio	1–5	1–5	4–2	3–3	—	3–3	12–18
Utah	3–3	4–2	3–3	5–1	3–3	—	18–12

vs. Pacific Division

1987–88 NBA records
Team	GSW	LAC	LAL	PHO	POR	SEA	Total
Dallas	4–1	5–0	1–4	5–0	3–2	3–2	21–9
Denver	4–1	5–0	3–2	3–2	2–3	4–1	21–9
Houston	5–0	3–2	1–4	4–1	4–1	3–2	20–10
Sacramento	3–2	2–3	1–4	2–3	1–4	1–4	10–20
San Antonio	2–3	5–0	0–5	3–2	0–5	3–2	13–17
Utah	4–1	4–1	1–4	3–2	4–1	4–1	20–10

== Game log ==
=== Regular season ===
1987–88 game log
Total: 53–29 (home: 33–8; road: 20–21)
November: 7–5 (home: 5–1; road: 2–4)

Game	Date	Team	Score	High points	High rebounds	High assists	Location Attendance	Record
1	November 6, 1988; 7:30 p.m. CST	Utah	W 95–93	Aguirre (31)	Donaldson (13)	Alford; Blackman (5)	Reunion Arena; 17,007	1–0
2	November 7, 1987	@ San Antonio	L 106–130				HemisFair Arena	1–1
3	November 10, 1987; 9:30 p.m. CST	@ Seattle	W 117–101	Aguirre (25)	Aguirre (8)	Harper (16)	Seattle Center Coliseum; 10,447	2–1
4	November 11, 1987; 8:30 p.m. CST	@ Utah	L 92–121	Aguirre (21)	Tarpley (14)	Schrempf (4)	Salt Palace; 12,212	2–2
5	November 13, 1987; 7:00 p.m. CST	Seattle	L 95–103	Blackman, Perkins (19)	Donaldson (9)	Harper (7)	Reunion Arena; 17,007	2–3
6	November 14, 1987	Portland	W 127–116				Reunion Arena	3–3
7	November 18, 1987	L.A. Clippers	W 97–87				Reunion Arena	4–3
8	November 20, 1987; 9:30 p.m. CST	@ L.A. Lakers	L 116–119	Aguirre (35)	Blackman (7)	Davis (8)	The Forum; 17,505	4–4
9	November 21, 1987	@ Sacramento	W 103–96				ARCO Arena	5–4
10	November 25, 1987; 7:30 p.m. CST	Detroit	W 113–107	Blackman (30)	Perkins (12)	Harper (10)	Reunion Arena; 17,007	6–4
11	November 27, 1987; 7:00 p.m. CST	Chicago	W 94–93	Aguirre (26)	Tarpley (10)	Harper (11)	Reunion Arena; 17,007	7–4
12	November 28, 1987; 8:30 p.m. CST	@ Denver	L 98–106	Blackman (28)	Tarpley (18)	Harper (7)	McNichols Sports Arena; 13,400	7–5

December: 10–3 (home: 6–0; road: 4–3)

Game	Date	Team	Score	High points	High rebounds	High assists	Location Attendance	Record
13	December 4, 1987	Golden State	W 116–95				Reunion Arena	8–5
14	December 5, 1987; 7:30 p.m. CST	Denver	W 109–96	Aguirre (35)	Aguirre (11)	Blackman (9)	Reunion Arena; 17,007	9–5
15	December 9, 1987	Sacramento	W 125–98				Reunion Arena	10–5
16	December 11, 1987	Phoenix	W 108–104				Reunion Arena	11–5
17	December 13, 1987; 7:30 p.m. CST	@ Milwaukee	W 113–99	Perkins (21)	Donaldson (9)	Harper (11)	MECCA Arena; 11,052	12–5
18	December 15, 1987; 6:30 p.m. CST	@ Cleveland	L 93–106	Harper (21)	Donaldson (12)	Aguirre, Blackman, Harper (4)	Richfield Coliseum; 6,852	12–6
19	December 16, 1987	@ New Jersey	W 109–105 (OT)				Brendan Byrne Arena	13–6
20	December 18, 1987; 6:30 p.m. CST	@ Detroit	L 112–117	Aguirre (35)	Donaldson (12)	Harper (7)	Pontiac Silverdome; 19,426	13–7
21	December 19, 1987	@ Philadelphia	L 90–95				The Spectrum	13–8
22	December 22, 1987; 7:00 p.m. CST	@ Chicago	W 111–100	Aguirre (32)	Donaldson (18)	Blackman, Harper (9)	Chicago Stadium; 18,103	14–8
23	December 23, 1987	@ Indiana	W 110–109				Market Square Arena	15–8
24	December 26, 1987	Houston	W 105–100				Reunion Arena	16–8
25	December 29, 1987	Sacramento	W 126–117				Reunion Arena	17–8

January: 11–4 (home: 5–2; road: 6–2)

Game	Date	Team	Score	High points	High rebounds	High assists	Location Attendance	Record
26	January 2, 1988	@ San Antonio	W 116–109				HemisFair Arena	18–8
27	January 4, 1988	@ Houston	L 107–117				The Summit	18–9
28	January 6, 1988; 9:30 p.m. CST	@ L.A. Lakers	L 89–103	Aguirre (29)	Donaldson (12)	Harper (11)	The Forum; 17,505	18–10
29	January 7, 1988	@ Phoenix	W 105–91				Arizona Veterans Memorial Coliseum	19–10
30	January 9, 1988	@ Golden State	W 115–99				Oakland–Alameda County Coliseum Arena	20–10
31	January 13, 1988	Indiana	W 110–108				Reunion Arena	21–10
32	January 16, 1988; 12:30 p.m. CST	Atlanta	L 98–101	Aguirre (32)	Tarpley (8)	Harper (11)	Reunion Arena; 17,007	21–11
33	January 18, 1988; 9:30 p.m. CST	@ L.A. Clippers	W 99–87				Los Angeles Memorial Sports Arena	22–11
34	January 19, 1988	@ Portland	W 120–116				Memorial Coliseum	23–11
35	January 22, 1988	L.A. Clippers	W 110–87				Reunion Arena	24–11
36	January 23, 1988; 7:30 p.m. CST	Milwaukee	W 113–97	Aguirre (35)	Donaldson, Tarpley (14)	Harper (12)	Reunion Arena; 17,007	25–11
37	January 26, 1988	San Antonio	W 128–111				Reunion Arena	26–11
38	January 27, 1988	@ Phoenix	W 121–102				Arizona Veterans Memorial Coliseum	27–11
39	January 29, 1988; 7:30 p.m. CST	Seattle	W 117–109	Aguirre (29)	Donaldson (10)	Harper (5)	Reunion Arena; 17,007	28–11
40	January 30, 1988	Houston	L 92–108				Reunion Arena	28–12

February: 10–5 (home: 7–2; road: 3–3)

Game	Date	Team	Score	High points	High rebounds	High assists	Location Attendance	Record
41	February 1, 1988	New Jersey	L 103–108				Reunion Arena	28–13
42	February 3, 1988; 8:30 p.m. CST	@ Denver	L 105–115	Aguirre (27)	Donaldson (15)	Harper (7)	McNichols Sports Arena; 10,667	28–14
43	February 4, 1988	@ Sacramento	L 101–118				ARCO Arena	28–15
All-Star Break
44	February 9, 1988; 7:00 p.m. CST	Utah	W 124–93	Harper (21)	Tarpley (13)	Aguirre (8)	Reunion Arena; 17,007	29–15
45	February 10, 1988; 8:30 p.m. CST	@ Utah	L 80–93	Blackman (18)	Tarpley (17)	Harper (6)	Salt Palace; 12,444	29–16
46	February 12, 1988; 7:30 p.m. CST	Boston	L 104–105	Aguirre (38)	Tarpley (14)	Harper (10)	Reunion Arena; 17,007	29–17
47	February 14, 1988	@ L.A. Clippers	W 110–100				Los Angeles Memorial Sports Arena	30–17
48	February 15, 1988; 8:00 p.m. CST	@ Seattle	W 128–122 (2OT)	Blackman (28)	Donaldson (13)	Blackman (7)	Seattle Center Coliseum; 13,492	31–17
49	February 17, 1988; 7:30 p.m. CST	Washington	W 123–108	Aguirre (35)	Tarpley (19)	Harper (11)	Reunion Arena; 17,007	32–17
50	February 19, 1988; 7:30 p.m. CST	Golden State	W 113–100				Reunion Arena	33–17
51	February 22, 1988; 7:30 p.m. CST	Phoenix	W 114–107				Reunion Arena	34–17
52	February 24, 1988; 7:30 p.m. CST	Cleveland	W 93–89	Blackman (26)	Tarpley (9)	Davis, Harper (5)	Reunion Arena; 17,007	35–17
53	February 25, 1988	@ Houston	W 108–106				The Summit	36–17
54	February 27, 1988	Philadelphia	W 100–91				Reunion Arena	37–17
55	February 29, 1988; 7:30 p.m. CST	Denver	W 123–96	Aguirre, Perkins (22)	Tarpley (21)	Aguirre (9)	Reunion Arena; 17,007	38–17

March: 8–6 (home: 6–2; road: 2–4)

Game	Date	Team	Score	High points	High rebounds	High assists	Location Attendance	Record
56	March 2, 1988	Sacramento	W 115–90				Reunion Arena	39–17
57	March 4, 1988; 7:00 p.m. CST	Houston	W 118–110				Reunion Arena	40–17
58	March 6, 1988; 1:00 p.m. CST	L.A. Lakers	L 97–108	Aguirre (27)	Donaldson (12)	Davis, Harper (6)	Reunion Arena; 17,007	40–18
59	March 8, 1988	Portland	L 110–112				Reunion Arena	41–19
60	March 12, 1988; 10:00 p.m. CST	@ L.A. Lakers	W 110–101	Aguirre (21)	Tarpley (21)	Aguirre, Davis (5)	The Forum; 17,505	41–19
61	March 14, 1988	Golden State	W 121–101				Reunion Arena	42–19
62	March 16, 1988; 8:30 p.m. CST	@ Utah	L 105–120	Aguirre (29)	Perkins (10)	Harper (7)	Salt Palace; 12,444	42–20
63	March 18, 1988	@ L.A. Clippers	W 106–98				Los Angeles Memorial Sports Arena	43–20
64	March 20, 1988	@ Portland	L 99–105				Memorial Coliseum	43–21
65	March 22, 1988; 7:30 p.m. CST	New York	W 124–105				Reunion Arena	44–21
66	March 25, 1988	Portland	W 106–101				Reunion Arena	45–21
67	March 26, 1988	San Antonio	W 131–112				Reunion Arena	46–21
68	March 28, 1988; 6:30 p.m. CST	@ New York	L 106–114				Madison Square Garden	46–22
69	March 29, 1988; 7:00 p.m. CST	@ Atlanta	L 106–120	Harper (25)	Tarpley (19)	Harper (9)	The Omni; 14,583	46–23

April: 7–5 (home: 4–1; road: 3–4)

Game	Date	Team	Score	High points	High rebounds	High assists	Location Attendance	Record
70	April 1, 1988; 7:00 p.m. CST	@ Washington	L 113–128	Aguirre (38)	Donaldson (11)	Aguirre (6)	Capital Centre; 13,783	46–24
71	April 3, 1988; 12 Noon CDT	@ Boston	L 101–110	Tarpley (22)	Tarpley (16)	Blackman (6)	Boston Garden; 14,890	46–25
72	April 6, 1988	Phoenix	W 119–93				Reunion Arena	47–25
73	April 8, 1988; 7:30 p.m. CDT	Utah	W 118–95	Blackman (21)	Tarpley (15)	Harper (6)	Reunion Arena; 17,007	48–25
74	April 9, 1988; 7:30 p.m. CDT	Denver	W 135–109	Harper (35)	Donaldson (13)	Harper (11)	Reunion Arena; 17,007	49–25
75	April 12, 1988	@ Sacramento	W 104–96				ARCO Arena	50–25
76	April 13, 1988	@ Golden State	L 110–112				Oakland–Alameda County Coliseum Arena	50–26
77	April 15, 1988; 9:30 p.m. CDT	@ Seattle	L 88–115	Aguirre (24)	Donaldson (13)	Harper (5)	Seattle Center Coliseum; 12,576	50–27
78	April 17, 1988; 3:00 p.m. CDT	@ Denver	L 122–133	Blackman (31)	Donaldson; Tarpley (11)	Davis (6)	McNichols Sports Arena; 17,022	50–28
79	April 19, 1988; 7:30 p.m. CDT	@ Houston	W 104–96				The Summit	51–28
80	April 20, 1988; 7:30 p.m. CDT	L.A. Lakers	L 107–114	Tarpley (24)	Tarpley (13)	Blackman (7)	Reunion Arena; 17,007	51–29
81	April 22, 1988	San Antonio	W 127–96				Reunion Arena	52–29
82	April 24, 1988	@ San Antonio	W 119–109				HemisFair Arena	53–29

1987–88 schedule

=== Playoffs ===
1988 playoff game log
Western Conference First Round: 3–1 (home: 1–1; road: 2–0)

Game	Date	Team	Score	High points	High rebounds	High assists	Location Attendance	Series
1	April 28, 1988; 7:30 p.m. CDT	Houston	W 120–110	Roy Tarpley (24)	Roy Tarpley (9)	Derek Harper (8)	Reunion Arena; 17,007	1–0
2	April 30, 1988; 2:30 p.m. CDT	Houston	L 108–119	Roy Tarpley (23)	Roy Tarpley (13)	Derek Harper (8)	Reunion Arena; 17,007	1–1
3	May 3, 1988; 7:30 p.m. CDT	@ Houston	W 93–92	Roy Tarpley (17)	Roy Tarpley (13)	Rolando Blackman (7)	The Summit; 16,611	2–1
4	May 5, 1988; 7:00 p.m. CDT	@ Houston	W 107–97	Mark Aguirre (38)	James Donaldson (10)	Rolando Blackman (10)	The Summit; 16,611	3–1

Western Conference Semifinals: 4–2 (home: 2–1; road: 2–1)

Game	Date	Team	Score	High points	High rebounds	High assists	Location Attendance	Series
1	May 10, 1988; 8:30 p.m. CDT	@ Denver	L 115–126	Aguirre (26)	Donaldson (13)	Harper (5)	McNichols Sports Arena; 17,022	0–1
2	May 12, 1988; 9:00 p.m. CDT	@ Denver	W 112–108	Blackman (31)	Donaldson (13)	Harper (8)	McNichols Sports Arena; 17,022	1–1
3	May 14, 1988; 2:30 p.m. CDT	Denver	L 105–107	Perkins (17)	Tarpley (15)	Aguirre (6)	Reunion Arena; 17,007	1–2
4	May 15, 1988; 7:00 p.m. CDT	Denver	W 124–103	Aguirre (34)	Tarpley (13)	Harper (10)	Reunion Arena; 17,007	2–2
5	May 17, 1988; 9:00 p.m. CDT	@ Denver	W 110–106	Aguirre (25)	Tarpley (16)	Harper (6)	McNichols Sports Arena; 17,022	3–2
6	May 19, 1988; 7:00 p.m. CDT	Denver	W 108–95	Blackman, Perkins (23)	Tarpley (19)	Harper (9)	Reunion Arena; 17,007	4–2

Western Conference Finals: 3–4 (home: 3–0; road: 0–4)

Game	Date	Team	Score	High points	High rebounds	High assists	Location Attendance	Series
1	May 23, 1988; 9:30 p.m. CDT	@ L.A. Lakers	L 98–113	Aguirre, Blackman, Tarpley (18)	Tarpley (20)	Harper (7)	The Forum; 17,505	0–1
2	May 25, 1988; 9:30 p.m. CDT	@ L.A. Lakers	L 101–123	Aguirre (28)	Tarpley (13)	Harper (8)	The Forum; 17,505	0–2
3	May 27, 1988; 7:00 p.m. CDT	L.A. Lakers	W 106–94	Aguirre (23)	Tarpley (20)	Davis (6)	Reunion Arena; 17,007	1–2
4	May 29, 1988; 2:30 p.m. CDT	L.A. Lakers	W 118–104	Harper (35)	Tarpley (13)	Blackman (11)	Reunion Arena; 17,007	2–2
5	May 31, 1988; 10:30 p.m. CDT	@ L.A. Lakers	L 102–119	Aguirre (31)	Tarpley (11)	Harper (6)	The Forum; 17,505	2–3
6	June 2, 1988; 8:00 p.m. CDT	L.A. Lakers	W 105–103	Aguirre (23)	Aguirre (13)	Harper (10)	Reunion Arena; 17,007	3–3
7	June 4, 1988; 2:30 p.m. CDT	@ L.A. Lakers	L 102–117	Aguirre (24)	Donaldson (14)	Harper (11)	The Forum; 17,505	3–4

1988 schedule

== Starting Lineups ==
=== Regular Season ===
1987–88 Regular Season Starting Lineup game log
November

#	Date	Opponent	PF	SF	C	PG	SG
8	November 20	@ LAL					
10	November 25	DET					

December

#	Date	Opponent	PF	SF	C	PG	SG
20	December 18	@ DET					

January

#	Date	Opponent	PF	SF	C	PG	SG
28	January 6	@ LAL					

February

#	Date	Opponent	PF	SF	C	PG	SG
46	February 12	BOS					

March

#	Date	Opponent	PF	SF	C	PG	SG
58	March 6	LAL					
60	March 12	@ LAL					

April

#	Date	Opponent	PF	SF	C	PG	SG
71	April 3	@ BOS					
80	April 20	LAL					

=== Playoffs ===
1987–88 Playoffs Starting Lineup game log
Western Conference First Round: vs. Houston Rockets

#	Date	Opponent	PF	SF	C	PG	SG

Western Conference Semifinals: vs. Denver Nuggets

#	Date	Opponent	PF	SF	C	PG	SG

Western Conference Finals: vs. Los Angeles Lakers

#	Date	Opponent	PF	SF	C	PG	SG
1	May 23	@ LAL					
2	May 25	@ LAL					
3	May 27	LAL					
4	May 29	LAL					
5	May 31	@ LAL					
6	June 2	LAL					
7	June 4	@ LAL					

== Game Officials ==
=== Regular Season ===
1987–88 Regular Season Officials game log
November

#	Date	Opponent	Officials
8	November 20	@ LAL	No. 40 Mike Lauerman and No. 14 Jack Madden
10	November 25	DET	No. 34 Ronnie Nunn and No. 21 Bill Oakes

December

#	Date	Opponent	Officials
20	December 18	@ DET	No. 25 Hugh Evans and No. 32 Eddie F. Rush

January

#	Date	Opponent	Officials
28	January 6	@ LAL	No. 34 Ronnie Nunn and No. 4 Ed T. Rush

February

#	Date	Opponent	Officials
46	February 12	BOS	

March

#	Date	Opponent	Officials
58	March 6	LAL	No. 27 Dick Bavetta and No. 11 Jake O'Donnell
60	March 12	@ LAL	No. 43 Dan Crawford and No. 10 Darell Garretson

April

#	Date	Opponent	Officials
71	April 3	@ BOS	
80	April 20	LAL	No. 28 Tommy Nunez and No. 11 Jake O'Donnell

=== Playoffs ===
1987–88 Playoffs Officials game log
Western Conference First Round: vs. Houston Rockets

#	Date	Opponent	Officials	Alternate

Western Conference Semifinals: vs. Denver Nuggets

#	Date	Opponent	Officials	Alternate

Western Conference Finals: vs. Los Angeles Lakers

#	Date	Opponent	Officials	Alternate
1	May 23	@ LAL	No. 17 Joe Crawford and No. 14 Jack Madden	No. 21 Bill Oakes
2	May 25	@ LAL	No. 4 Ed T. Rush and No. 21 Bill Oakes	No. 42 Hue Hollins
3	May 27	LAL	No. 10 Darell Garretson and No. 42 Hue Hollins	No. 27 Dick Bavetta
4	May 29	LAL	No. 11 Jake O'Donnell and No. 27 Dick Bavetta	No. 13 Mike Mathis
5	May 31	@ LAL	No. 25 Hugh Evans and No. 12 Earl Strom	No. 24 Bill Saar
6	June 2	LAL	No. 20 Jess Kersey and No. 4 Ed T. Rush	No. 22 Paul Mihalak
7	June 4	@ LAL	No. 14 Jack Madden and No. 11 Jake O'Donnell	No. 42 Hue Hollins

== Awards and honors ==
=== Week/Month ===
- Roy Tarpley was named Player of the Week for games played February 22 through February 28.

=== All-Star ===
- Mark Aguirre was selected as a reserve for the Western Conference in the All-Star Game. It was his third All-Star selection. Aguirre finished seventh in voting among Western Conference forwards with 347,357 votes.
- James Donaldson was selected as a reserve for the Western Conference in the All-Star Game. It was his first and only All-Star selection. Donaldson finished fourth in voting among Western Conference centers with 310,100 votes.
- Detlef Schrempf was selected to compete in the Three-Point Shootout. Schrempf was eliminated in the second round.

=== Season ===
- Roy Tarpley received the Sixth Man of the Year Award.
- Mark Aguirre finished 14th in MVP voting.

== Player statistics ==
=== Regular season ===
Player	POS	GP	GS	MP	REB	AST	STL	BLK	PTS	MPG	RPG	APG	SPG	BPG	PPG
Derek Harper	PG	82	82	3,032	246	634	168	35	1,393	37.0	3.0	7.7	2.0	.4	17.0
Detlef Schrempf	SF	82	4	1,587	279	159	42	32	698	19.4	3.4	1.9	.5	.4	8.5
James Donaldson	C	81	81	2,523	755	66	40	104	571	31.1	9.3	.8	.5	1.3	7.0
Roy Tarpley	PF	81	9	2,307	959	86	103	86	1,093	28.5	11.8	1.1	1.3	1.1	13.5
Mark Aguirre	SF	77	77	2,610	434	278	70	57	1,932	33.9	5.6	3.6	.9	.7	25.1
Sam Perkins	PF	75	75	2,499	601	118	74	54	1,066	33.3	8.0	1.6	1.0	.7	14.2
Brad Davis	PG	75	12	1,480	102	303	51	18	537	19.7	1.4	4.0	.7	.2	7.2
Uwe Blab	C	73	1	658	134	35	8	29	162	9.0	1.8	.5	.1	.4	2.2
Rolando Blackman	SG	71	69	2,580	246	262	64	18	1,325	36.3	3.5	3.7	.9	.3	18.7
Jim Farmer	SG	30	0	157	18	16	3	1	61	5.2	.6	.5	.1	.0	2.0
Bill Wennington	C	30	0	125	39	4	5	9	63	4.2	1.3	.1	.2	.3	2.1
Steve Alford	PG	28	0	197	23	23	17	3	59	7.0	.8	.8	.6	.1	2.1

=== Playoffs ===
Player	POS	GP	GS	MP	REB	AST	STL	BLK	PTS	MPG	RPG	APG	SPG	BPG	PPG
Rolando Blackman	SG	17	17	672	55	77	15	3	307	39.5	3.2	4.5	.9	.2	18.1
Derek Harper	PG	17	17	602	43	121	32	5	230	35.4	2.5	7.1	1.9	.3	13.5
Sam Perkins	PF	17	17	572	112	31	25	17	230	33.6	6.6	1.8	1.5	1.0	13.5
Mark Aguirre	SF	17	17	558	100	56	14	9	367	32.8	5.9	3.3	.8	.5	21.6
James Donaldson	C	17	17	499	146	12	7	15	158	29.4	8.6	.7	.4	.9	9.3
Roy Tarpley	PF	17	0	563	219	30	21	26	304	33.1	12.9	1.8	1.2	1.5	17.9
Brad Davis	PG	17	0	295	20	55	3	5	109	17.4	1.2	3.2	.2	.3	6.4
Detlef Schrempf	SF	15	0	274	55	24	8	7	117	18.3	3.7	1.6	.5	.5	7.8
Bill Wennington	C	6	0	14	4	1	1	0	0	2.3	.7	.2	.2	.0	.0
Steve Alford	PG	4	0	12	2	2	0	0	6	3.0	.5	.5	.0	.0	1.5
Jim Farmer	SG	3	0	11	4	1	0	0	4	3.7	1.3	.3	.0	.0	1.3
Uwe Blab	C	3	0	8	1	1	0	0	2	2.7	.3	.3	.0	.0	.7

== Transactions ==
=== Free agents ===
==== Subtractions ====
Date	Player	Reason Left	New Team
October 30, 1987	Dennis Nutt	Waived	Real Madrid (Spain)
November 17, 1987	Al Wood	Waived	Basket Mestre (Italy)
