= 1987–88 Denver Nuggets season =

NBA professional basketball team season

- Division champions
- Head coach: Doug Moe
- Arena: McNichols Sports Arena

Results
- Record: 54–28 (.659)
- Place: Division: 1st (Midwest); Conference: 2nd (Western)
- Playoff finish: West Conference semifinals (lost to Mavericks 2–4)
- Stats at Basketball Reference

The 1987–88 Denver Nuggets season was the 12th season for the Denver Nuggets in the National Basketball Association, and their 21st season as a franchise.

== Season summary ==
=== Off-season ===
During the off-season, the Nuggets acquired Michael Adams, and Jay Vincent from the Washington Bullets, and later on sold second-year guard Otis Smith to the Golden State Warriors in December.

=== Regular season ===
With the addition of Adams and Vincent, the Nuggets got off to an 8–4 start to the regular season, and later on held a 26–17 record at the All-Star break. The team posted a 10-game winning streak between March and April, and won 16 of their final 18 games of the season. The Nuggets finished in first place in the Midwest Division with a 54–28 record, and earned the second seed in the Western Conference; the team qualified for the NBA playoffs for the seventh consecutive year. Head coach Doug Moe was named the NBA Coach of the Year, after leading the Nuggets to a 17-game improvement over the previous season.

Alex English averaged 25.0 points, and 4.7 rebounds and assists per game each, while Fat Lever averaged 18.9 points, 8.1 rebounds, 7.8 assists and 2.7 steals per game, and was named to the NBA All-Defensive Second Team, and Vincent played a sixth man role off the bench, averaging 15.4 points and 4.2 rebounds per game. In addition, Adams provided the team with 13.9 points, 6.1 assists and 2.0 steals per game, and also led them with 139 three-point field goals, while Danny Schayes provided with 13.9 points and 8.2 rebounds per game, and Blair Rasmussen contributed 12.7 points and 5.5 rebounds per game. Meanwhile, Calvin Natt averaged 9.6 points per game, but only played just 27 games due to a left knee injury, Wayne Cooper averaged 6.4 points, 6.0 rebounds and 2.1 blocks per game, but only appeared in just 45 games due to a back injury, Bill Hanzlik provided with 4.5 points per game, and defensive guard T.R. Dunn contributed 2.2 points and 1.2 steals per game.

During the NBA All-Star weekend at the Chicago Stadium in Chicago, Illinois, English and Lever were both selected for the 1988 NBA All-Star Game, as members of the Western Conference All-Star team. Lever finished in ninth place in Most Valuable Player voting, while English finished in eleventh place, and Adams finished tied in 14th place; Lever also finished tied in fifth place in Defensive Player of the Year voting, and Adams finished in fourth place in Most Improved Player voting.

The Nuggets finished ninth in the NBA in home-game attendance, with an attendance of 520,881 at the McNichols Sports Arena during the regular season.

=== NBA playoffs ===
In the Western Conference First Round of the 1988 NBA playoffs, the Nuggets faced off against the 7th–seeded Seattle SuperSonics, a team that featured the trio of Dale Ellis, All-Star forward Xavier McDaniel, and All-Star forward Tom Chambers. The Nuggets took a 2–1 series lead before losing Game 4 to the SuperSonics on the road, 127–117 at the Seattle Center Coliseum. With the series tied at 2–2, the Nuggets won Game 5 over the SuperSonics at home, 115–96 at the McNichols Sports Arena to win in a hard-fought five-game series.

In the Western Conference Semi-finals, the team faced off against the 3rd–seeded Dallas Mavericks, a team that featured the quartet of All-Star forward Mark Aguirre, Rolando Blackman, Derek Harper and All-Star center James Donaldson. The Nuggets won Game 1 over the Mavericks at the McNichols Sports Arena, 126–115, but then lost Game 2 at home, 112–108 as the Mavericks evened the series. The Nuggets won Game 3 over the Mavericks on the road, 107–105 at the Reunion Arena to take a 2–1 series lead. However, the Nuggets lost the next three games, including a Game 6 loss to the Mavericks at the Reunion Arena, 108–95, thus losing the series in six games.

=== Aftermath ===
Following the season, Dunn signed as a free agent with the Phoenix Suns during the next season.

== Draft picks ==
Round	Pick	Player	Position	Nationality	School/Club team
2	31	Andre Moore	PF	United States; Australia	Loyola (IL)
3	54	Tom Schafer		United States	Iowa State
4	77	David Boone		United States	Marquette
5	100	Ron Grandison		United States	New Orleans
6	123	Kelvin Scarborough		United States	New Mexico
7	146	Rowan Gomes		United States	Hampton
7	156	Curtis Hunter		United States	North Carolina

== Roster ==
1987–88 Denver Nuggets roster
Players

Pos.	No.	Player	Height	Weight	DOB	From
PG	14	Michael Adams	5 ft 10 in (1.78 m)	162 lb (73 kg)		Boston College
SF	35	Michael Brooks	6 ft 7 in (2.01 m)	220 lb (100 kg)		La Salle
C	42	Wayne Cooper	6 ft 10 in (2.08 m)	220 lb (100 kg)		LSU New Orleans
SG	23	T.R. Dunn	6 ft 4 in (1.93 m)	190 lb (86 kg)		Alabama
SF	2	Alex English	6 ft 7 in (2.01 m)	190 lb (86 kg)		South Carolina
PG	5	Mike Evans	6 ft 1 in (1.85 m)	170 lb (77 kg)		Kansas State
SF	24	Bill Hanzlik	6 ft 7 in (2.01 m)	185 lb (84 kg)		Notre Dame
SG	12	Fat Lever	6 ft 3 in (1.91 m)	170 lb (77 kg)		Arizona State
SF	11	Maurice Martin	6 ft 6 in (1.98 m)	200 lb (91 kg)		Saint Joseph's
PF	33	Calvin Natt	6 ft 6 in (1.98 m)	220 lb (100 kg)		Louisiana–Monroe
C	41	Blair Rasmussen	7 ft 0 in (2.13 m)	250 lb (113 kg)		Oregon
PF	34	Danny Schayes	6 ft 11 in (2.11 m)	235 lb (107 kg)		Syracuse
SF	30	Jay Vincent	6 ft 7 in (2.01 m)	220 lb (100 kg)		Michigan State

Coaches
Head coach
- Doug Moe
Assistant(s)
- Allan Bristow

Legend
- (DP) Unsigned draft pick
- (FA) Free agent
- (S) Suspended
- Injured

== Regular season ==
=== Season standings ===
Midwest Division	W	L	PCT	GB	Home	Road	Div
y-Denver Nuggets	54	28	.659	–	35–6	19–22	18–12
x-Dallas Mavericks	53	29	.646	1	33–8	20–21	20–10
x-Utah Jazz	47	35	.573	7	33–8	14–27	18–12
x-Houston Rockets	46	36	.561	8	31–10	15–26	13–17
x-San Antonio Spurs	31	51	.378	23	23–18	8–33	12–18
Sacramento Kings	24	58	.293	30	19–22	5–36	9–21

#	Western Conference				
#	Team	W	L	PCT	GB
1	z-Los Angeles Lakers	62	20	.756	–
2	y-Denver Nuggets	54	28	.659	8
3	x-Dallas Mavericks	53	29	.646	9
4	x-Portland Trail Blazers	53	29	.646	9
5	x-Utah Jazz	47	35	.573	15
6	x-Houston Rockets	46	36	.561	16
7	x-Seattle SuperSonics	44	38	.537	18
8	x-San Antonio Spurs	31	51	.378	31
9	Phoenix Suns	28	54	.341	34
10	Sacramento Kings	24	58	.293	38
11	Golden State Warriors	20	62	.244	42
12	Los Angeles Clippers	17	65	.207	45

z – clinched division title
y – clinched division title
x – clinched playoff spot

== Game log ==
=== Regular season ===
1987–88 game log
Total: 54–28 (home: 35–6; road: 19–22)
November: 8–4 (home: 6–1; road: 2–3)

Game	Date	Team	Score	High points	High rebounds	High assists	Location Attendance	Record
1	November 6	L.A. Clippers	W 139–93				McNichols Sports Arena	1–0
2	November 7	@ Golden State	W 103–99				Oakland–Alameda County Coliseum Arena	2–0
3	November 10	@ Sacramento	L 123–134				ARCO Arena	2–1
4	November 12	Portland	W 126–113				McNichols Sports Arena	3–1
5	November 14	Sacramento	W 130–109				McNichols Sports Arena	4–1
6	November 17, 1987; 7:30 p.m. MST	@ Utah	L 110–120	Lever (18)	Rasmussen (10)	Lever (7)	Salt Palace; 11,461	4–2
7	November 18	Indiana	L 106–117				McNichols Sports Arena	4–3
8	November 20	San Antonio	W 156–142				McNichols Sports Arena	5–3
9	November 21	@ L.A. Clippers	W 97–91				Los Angeles Memorial Sports Arena	6–3
10	November 24	New Jersey	W 132–104				McNichols Sports Arena	7–3
11	November 27, 1987; 8:30 p.m. MST	@ L.A. Lakers	L 119–127	English (27)	Schayes (14)	Adams, Lever (10)	The Forum; 17,505	7–4
12	November 28, 1987; 7:30 p.m. MST	Dallas	W 106–98	English (25)	Schayes (15)	English (7)	McNichols Sports Arena; 13,400	8–4

December: 8–7 (home: 5–1; road: 3–6)

Game	Date	Team	Score	High points	High rebounds	High assists	Location Attendance	Record
13	December 1	@ Houston	L 101–106				The Summit	8–5
14	December 2	Sacramento	W 147–120				McNichols Sports Arena	9–5
15	December 4, 1987; 7:30 p.m. MST	Chicago	W 105–89	English (21)	Rasmussen (12)	Adams (7)	McNichols Sports Arena; 17,022	10–5
16	December 5, 1987; 6:30 p.m. MST	@ Dallas	L 96–109	English, Vincent (16)	English, Lever, Rasmussen (5)	Adams, English, Lever (5)	Reunion Arena; 17,007	10–6
17	December 9, 1987; 5:30 p.m. MST	@ Boston	W 124–119	Adams (31)	Lever (11)	Lever (13)	Boston Garden; 14,890	11–6
18	December 10	@ New York	L 97–113				Madison Square Garden	11–7
19	December 12	@ Philadelphia	W 131–121				The Spectrum	12–7
20	December 16	Houston	W 132–113				McNichols Sports Arena	13–7
21	December 18	@ San Antonio	L 114–133				HemisFair Arena	13–8
22	December 19	@ Houston	W 121–117				The Summit	14–8
23	December 22	Phoenix	W 119–104				McNichols Sports Arena	15–8
24	December 23	@ Golden State	L 117–129				Oakland–Alameda County Coliseum Arena	15–9
25	December 26	Seattle	W 115–111				McNichols Sports Arena	16–9
26	December 28	@ Seattle	L 100–108				Seattle Center Coliseum	16–10
27	December 29, 1987; 7:30 p.m. MST	Utah	L 97–98	Schayes (27)	English, Lever, Schayes (11)	Lever (6)	McNichols Sports Arena; 10,621	16–11

January: 8–6 (home: 5–1; road: 3–5)

Game	Date	Team	Score	High points	High rebounds	High assists	Location Attendance	Record
28	January 1, 1988; 6:00 p.m. MST	@ Washington	W 124–109	Vincent (33)	Schayes (7)	Adams (10)	Capital Centre; 5,326	17–11
29	January 2, 1988; 5:30 p.m. MST	@ Detroit	W 151–142	English (34)	Cooper (11)	Lever (13)	Pontiac Silverdome; 23,746	18–11
30	January 4, 1988; 5:30 p.m. MST	@ Cleveland	L 101–122	Evans (28)	Schayes (8)	English (7)	Richfield Coliseum; 6,448	18–12
31	January 6	@ New Jersey	W 98–93				Brendan Byrne Arena	19–12
32	January 7, 1988; 6:30 p.m. MST	@ Chicago	L 96–100	Lever (31)	Lever (16)	Lever (12)	Chicago Stadium; 17,590	19–13
33	January 9, 1988; 5:30 p.m. MST	@ Atlanta	L 105–113	English (27)	Rasmussen, Schayes (9)	Lever (6)	The Omni; 14,986	19–14
34	January 11	@ Phoenix	L 115–127				Arizona Veterans Memorial Coliseum	19–15
35	January 14, 1988; 7:30 p.m. MST	Atlanta	W 115–112	English (27)	Schayes (12)	English, Lever, Vincent (5)	McNichols Sports Arena; 14,944	20–15
36	January 16	Golden State	W 115–94				McNichols Sports Arena	21–15
37	January 18, 1988; 2:00 p.m. MST	Detroit	L 116–123	English (32)	Vincent (11)	English (7)	McNichols Sports Arena; 13,004	21–16
38	January 21, 1988; 7:30 p.m. MST	L.A. Lakers	W 115–113	Vincent (23)	Vincent (12)	Lever (8)	McNichols Sports Arena; 17,022	22–16
39	January 22	@ Portland	L 106–126				Memorial Coliseum	22–17
40	January 28, 1988; 7:30 p.m. MST	Milwaukee	W 122–113	English (24)	Rasmussen (8)	Adams, English, Lever (8)	McNichols Sports Arena; 13,911	23–17
41	January 30	L.A. Clippers	W 124–106				McNichols Sports Arena	24–17

February: 9–4 (home: 7–1; road: 2–3)

Game	Date	Team	Score	High points	High rebounds	High assists	Location Attendance	Record
42	February 3, 1988; 7:30 p.m. MST	Dallas	W 115–105	English (26)	Lever (9)	Adams (9)	McNichols Sports Arena; 10,667	25–17
43	February 4	@ San Antonio	W 129–123				HemisFair Arena	26–17
All-Star Break
44	February 9	San Antonio	W 136-108				McNichols Sports Arena	27–17
45	February 11, 1988; 7:30 p.m. MST	L.A. Lakers	L 105–120	English (31)	Rasmussenn (9)	Adams (8)	McNichols Sports Arena; 17,022	27–18
46	February 12	@ Portland	L 105–120				Memorial Coliseum	27–19
47	February 14, 1988; 7:30 p.m. MST	Utah	W 107–93	English (25)	Lever (15)	Lever (8)	McNichols Sports Arena; 9,971	28–19
48	February 17, 1988; 7:30 p.m. MST	Boston	W 138–125	English (37)	Rasmussen (11)	English (11)	McNichols Sports Arena; 17,022	29–19
49	February 20	@ Phoenix	L 108–128				Arizona Veterans Memorial Coliseum	29–20
50	February 22, 1988; 7:30 p.m. MST	Washington	W 100–87	Schayes (21)	Lever (15)	English (8)	McNichols Sports Arena; 10,553	30–20
51	February 24, 1988; 7:30 p.m. MST	@ Utah	W 123–120	English, Rasmussen (35)	Lever (10)	Lever (16)	Salt Palace; 12,444	31–20
52	February 26	Philadelphia	W 120–104				McNichols Sports Arena	32–20
53	February 28	New York	W 109–100				McNichols Sports Arena	33–20
54	February 29, 1988; 6:30 p.m. MST	@ Dallas	L 96–123	Schayes (21)	Lever (8)	Adams (8)	Reunion Arena; 17,007	33–21

March: 12–5 (home: 6–2; road: 6–3)

Game	Date	Team	Score	High points	High rebounds	High assists	Location Attendance	Record
55	March 2, 1988; 7:30 p.m. MST	Cleveland	W 99–81	Adams (23)	Lever (20)	Lever (12)	McNichols Sports Arena; 9,178	34–21
56	March 4	Phoenix	W 116–108				McNichols Sports Arena	35–21
57	March 5	@ Seattle	W 115–102				Seattle Center Coliseum	36–21
58	March 7	@ Sacramento	L 114–116 (OT)				ARCO Arena	36–22
59	March 8	Houston	L 103–113				McNichols Sports Arena	36–23
60	March 11, 1988; 7:00 p.m. MST	@ Milwaukee	L 93–132	Rasmussen (21)	Rasmussen (8)	Adams (7)	MECCA Arena; 11,052	36–24
61	March 13	@ Indiana	W 108–100				Market Square Arena	37–24
62	March 14, 1988; 7:30 p.m. MST	Utah	L 115–116	English (27)	Lever (17)	English (8)	McNichols Sports Arena; 10,172	37–25
63	March 17	Portland	W 116–115 (OT)				McNichols Sports Arena	38–25
64	March 18, 1988; 7:30 p.m. MST	@ Utah	L 111–118	Adams (22)	Lever, Rasmussen (11)	Lever (9)	Salt Palace; 12,444	38–26
65	March 20	Seattle	W 108–95				McNichols Sports Arena	39–26
66	March 22	San Antonio	W 136–109				McNichols Sports Arena	40–26
67	March 23	@ L.A. Clippers	W 118–108				Los Angeles Memorial Sports Arena	41–26
68	March 25, 1988; 8:30 p.m. MST	@ L.A. Lakers	W 120–119	English (34)	Schayes (9)	Lever (11)	The Forum; 17,505	42–26
69	March 26	@ Golden State	W 131–108				Oakland–Alameda County Coliseum Arena	43–26
70	March 29	@ Sacramento	W 107–103				ARCO Arena	44–26
71	March 31	Sacramento	W 121–111				McNichols Sports Arena	45–26

April: 9–2 (home: 6–0; road: 3–2)

Game	Date	Team	Score	High points	High rebounds	High assists	Location Attendance	Record
72	April 2	Golden State	W 123–107				McNichols Sports Arena	46–26
73	April 5	@ Houston	W 110–97				The Summit	47–26
74	April 8	@ San Antonio	W 129–124 (OT)				HemisFair Arena	48–26
75	April 9, 1988; 6:30 p.m. MDT	@ Dallas	L 109–135	Schayes (21)	Brooks (7)	Adams (10)	Reunion Arena; 17,007	48–27
76	April 11	@ Phoenix	W 123–119				Arizona Veterans Memorial Coliseum	49–27
77	April 13, 1988; 7:30 p.m. MDT	L.A. Lakers	W 120–106	English (29)	Lever (12)	Adams (9)	McNichols Sports Arena; 17,022	50–27
78	April 15	Houston	W 132–125				McNichols Sports Arena	51–27
79	April 17, 1988; 2:00 p.m. MDT	Dallas	W 133–122	English (31)	Lever (19)	Lever (13)	McNichols Sports Arena; 17,022	52–27
80	April 19	Seattle	W 134–114				McNichols Sports Arena	53–27
81	April 22	@ Portland	L 135–141 (OT)				Memorial Coliseum	53–28
82	April 23	L.A. Clippers	W 134–109				McNichols Sports Arena	54–28

1987–88 schedule

=== Playoffs ===
1988 playoff game log
First Round: 3–2 (home: 2–1; road: 1–1)

Game	Date	Team	Score	High points	High rebounds	High assists	Location Attendance	Series
1	April 29	Seattle	W 126–123	Alex English (28)	Fat Lever (11)	Fat Lever (8)	McNichols Sports Arena; 17,022	1–0
2	May 1	Seattle	L 91–111	English, Evans (16)	Fat Lever (12)	Michael Adams (5)	McNichols Sports Arena; 17,022	1–1
3	May 3	@ Seattle	W 125–114	Blair Rasmussen (28)	Blair Rasmussen (12)	Adams, Lever (7)	Seattle Center Coliseum; 14,250	2–1
4	May 5	@ Seattle	L 117–127	Jay Vincent (28)	Danny Schayes (8)	English, Evans (5)	Seattle Center Coliseum; 14,250	2–2
5	May 7	Seattle	W 115–96	Alex English (23)	Jay Vincent (7)	Alex English (7)	McNichols Sports Arena; 16,040	3–2

Western Conference Semifinals: 2–4 (home: 1–2; road: 1–2)

Game	Date	Team	Score	High points	High rebounds	High assists	Location Attendance	Series
1	May 10, 1988; 7:30 p.m. MDT	Dallas	W 126–115	Lever (30)	Lever (11)	English, Lever (8)	McNichols Sports Arena; 17,022	1–0
2	May 12, 1988; 8:00 p.m. MDT	Dallas	L 108–112	English, Lever (22)	Schayes (12)	Adams (7)	McNichols Sports Arena; 17,022	1–1
3	May 14, 1988; 1:30 p.m. MDT	@ Dallas	W 107–105	English (23)	Lever (11)	Lever (12)	Reunion Arena; 17,007	2–1
4	May 15, 1988; 6:00 p.m. MDT	@ Dallas	L 103–124	English (24)	Cooper (10)	Adams (9)	Reunion Arena; 17,007	2–2
5	May 17, 1988; 8:00 p.m. MDT	Dallas	L 106–110	Schayes (33)	Schayes (13)	Adams, English (6)	McNichols Sports Arena; 17,022	2–3
6	May 19, 1988; 8:00 p.m. MDT	@ Dallas	L 95–108	English (34)	Schayes (9)	Adams (8)	Reunion Arena; 17,007	2–4

1988 schedule

== Awards and records ==
- Doug Moe, NBA Coach of the Year Award
- Lafayette Lever, NBA All-Defensive Second Team

== See also ==
- 1987–88 NBA season
