= Ed Gregory =

American basketball player, scout, coach, executive

Personal information
- Born: October 28, 1931 Memphis, Texas, U.S.
- Died: August 31, 2022 (aged 90) Fresno, California, U.S.

Career information
- College: Pepperdine (1952–1955)
- Coaching career: 1963–1977, 1986–1988

Career history

Coaching
- 1963–1965: UNLV
- 1965–1977: Fresno State
- 1986–1988: Golden State Warriors (assistant)
- 1988: Golden State Warriors (interim)

Eddie J. Gregory (October 28, 1931 – August 31, 2022) was an American basketball scout, coach, and executive. In the 1960s he was the head men's basketball coach at Fresno State University; he also coached at the University of Nevada, Las Vegas (UNLV). He served as interim head coach of the Golden State Warriors for the final 18 games of the 1987–88 season, after George Karl departed. Gregory served as "Basketball GM and Scouting" instructor for the online sports career training school, Sports Management Worldwide in Portland, Oregon.

Gregory was born in Memphis, Texas. He played on the basketball and baseball teams at Pepperdine College where he graduated in 1955. Gregory received his master's degree from the University of Southern California in 1958.

Gregory was the head coach of the UNLV Runnin' Rebels from 1963 to 1965 and the Fresno State Bulldogs from 1965 to 1977. He resigned as head coach in 1977 but stayed at Fresno State University as a professor. Gregory scouted for the Portland Trail Blazers and Cleveland Cavaliers during this time. In 1986, he retired from Fresno State and followed Cavaliers head coach George Karl to the Golden State Warriors to become his assistant coach. Gregory worked for the Warriors for over a decade and retired as the director of scouting.

Gregory died on August 31, 2022, in Fresno, California. He was predeceased by his wife, Sally Gregory. He had three children.

== Head coaching record ==
Team	Year	G	W	L	W–L%	Finish	PG	PW	PL	PW–L%	Result
Golden State	1987–88	18	4	14	.222	5th in Pacific	—	—	—	—	Missed playoffs
Career		18	4	14	.222		0	0	0	–	
