= Jim Farmer =

American basketball player (born 1964)

Personal information
- Born: September 23, 1964 (age 62) Dothan, Alabama, U.S.
- Listed height: 6 ft 4 in (1.93 m)
- Listed weight: 190 lb (86 kg)

Career information
- High school: Houston Academy (Dothan, Alabama)
- College: Alabama (1983–1987)
- NBA draft: 1987: 1st round, 20th overall pick
- Drafted by: Dallas Mavericks
- Playing career: 1987–1997
- Position: Point guard / shooting guard
- Number: 20, 30, 21, 22

Career history
- 1987–1988: Dallas Mavericks
- 1989: Utah Jazz
- 1989–1990: Pensacola Tornados
- 1990: Seattle SuperSonics
- 1990: Philadelphia 76ers
- 1990–1991: Pensacola Tornados
- 1991: Denver Nuggets
- 1991–1992: Birmingham Bandits
- 1992: Rapid City Thrillers
- 1992–1993: Columbus Horizon
- 1993: Scavolini Pesaro
- 1993–1994: Yakima Sun Kings
- 1994: Denver Nuggets
- 1996–1997: Fort Wayne Fury
- Stats at NBA.com
- Stats at Basketball Reference

James Hubert Farmer (born September 23, 1964) is an American former professional basketball player who was drafted by the Dallas Mavericks in the first round (20th pick overall) of the 1987 NBA draft. Farmer, a 6'4" 190 lb small forward, played for the Mavericks, Utah Jazz, Seattle SuperSonics, Philadelphia 76ers, and Denver Nuggets across parts of five NBA seasons. His best stint as an NBA player was during the 1990–91 season, when he appeared in 25 games for the Nuggets and averaged 10.0 ppg. He toured the Orient with an Athletes in Action team in 1984.

== Personal life ==
Jim is a native of Dothan, Alabama, and is a 1982 graduate of Houston Academy in Dothan. He played basketball collegiately at the University of Alabama.

=== Legal issues ===
In 2019, Farmer was one of 16 men arrested in the two-day sting operation southeast of Nashville, Tennessee. He allegedly responded to an adult escort advertisement and agreed to both meet and pay $170 to an undercover officer who identified herself as a 16-year-old girl for sex, per the report.

In 2020, Farmer was indicted on new trafficking charges in by a Rutherford County grand jury, the new charges including "attempted patronizing prostitution and three counts of attempted solicitation of a minor."

== Career statistics ==
Legend
GP	Games played	GS	Games started	MPG	Minutes per game
FG%	Field goal percentage	3P%	3-point field goal percentage	FT%	Free throw percentage
RPG	Rebounds per game	APG	Assists per game	SPG	Steals per game
BPG	Blocks per game	PPG	Points per game	**Bold**	Career high
†	Won an NBA championship

=== NBA ===
==== Regular season ====
Year	Team	GP	GS	MPG	FG%	3P%	FT%	RPG	APG	SPG	BPG	PPG
1987–88	Dallas	30	0	5.2	.377	.000	.900	.6	.5	.1	.0	2.0
1988–89	Utah	37	0	11.1	.401	**.450**	.707	1.5	.8	.2	.0	4.1
1989–90	Seattle	**38**	0	10.5	.438	.296	.713	1.1	.7	.4	.0	6.4
1990–91	Philadelphia	2	0	6.5	.286	.000	**1.000**	**2.5**	.0	.0	.0	3.0
1990–91	Denver	25	**1**	**17.7**	**.458**	.227	.730	**2.5**	**1.5**	**.5**	**.1**	**10.0**
1993–94	Denver	4	0	7.3	.333	.000	–	.5	1.0	.0	.0	1.0
Career		136	1	10.7	.428	.282	.730	1.4	.8	.3	.0	5.3

==== Playoffs ====
Year	Team	GP	GS	MPG	FG%	3P%	FT%	RPG	APG	SPG	BPG	PPG
1988	Dallas	**3**	0	**3.7**	**.333**	–	–	**1.3**	**.3**	.0	.0	**1.3**
1989	Utah	2	0	1.5	.000	.000	–	.0	.0	.0	.0	.0
Career		5	0	2.8	.250	.000	–	.8	.2	.0	.0	.8
