= 1987–88 Golden State Warriors season =

NBA professional basketball team season

- Head coach: George Karl; Ed Gregory
- Arena: Oakland-Alameda County Coliseum Arena

Results
- Record: 20–62 (.244)
- Place: Division: 5th (Pacific); Conference: 11th (Western)
- Playoff finish: Did not qualify
- Stats at Basketball Reference

Local media
- Television: KPIX-TV
- Radio: KNBR

The 1987–88 Golden State Warriors season was the 42nd season for the Golden State Warriors in the National Basketball Association, and their 25th season in the San Francisco Bay Area.

== Season summary ==
=== Off-season ===
The Warriors had the 14th overall pick in the 1987 NBA draft, and selected power forward Tellis Frank out of Western Kentucky University. During the off-season, former Milwaukee Bucks coach Don Nelson became the team's new General Manager.

For the season, the Warriors slightly updated their home and road uniforms; the team changed the colors of the jersey trim, waistband, and side panels on their shorts from blue to yellow on their white home uniforms, and yellow to white on their blue road uniforms. The team's updated home and road uniforms would remain in use until 1989.

=== Regular season ===
The Warriors made two separate trades with the Houston Rockets; before the regular season began in early November, the team traded Purvis Short to the Rockets in exchange for Dave Feitl, then in December, traded All-Star center Joe Barry Carroll, and All-Star guard Sleepy Floyd in exchange for All-Star center Ralph Sampson, and Steve Harris. Before the trade, Floyd averaged 21.2 points, 5.1 rebounds, 9.9 assists and 1.5 steals per game in 18 games, while Barry Carroll provided with 15.5 points, 6.6 rebounds and 1.8 blocks per game in 14 games. In November, the team signed free agent and rookie point guard Winston Garland, then in December, traded second-year center Chris Washburn to the Atlanta Hawks, acquired second-year guard Otis Smith from the Denver Nuggets, and signed Dave Hoppen in January.

The Warriors struggled losing 18 of their first 21 games of the regular season, which included a seven-game losing streak in November, and later on held a 10–32 record at the All-Star break. The team posted an eight-game losing streak between February and March; after holding a 16–48 record as of March 20, 1988, George Karl resigned as head coach and was replaced with assistant coach Ed Gregory as an interim coach. The Warriors posted another seven-game losing streak between March and April, and finished in fifth place in the Pacific Division with a 20–62 record.

Chris Mullin averaged 20.2 points, 4.8 assists and 1.9 steals per game, while Rod Higgins averaged 15.5 points per game, and Sampson provided the team with 15.4 points, 10.0 rebounds and 1.9 blocks per game in 29 games after the trade. In addition, Otis Smith provided with 13.1 points and 1.5 steals per game in 57 games, while Terry Teagle contributed 12.6 points per game, but only played just 47 games due to hamstring and hip injuries, Garland averaged 12.4 points, 6.4 assists and 1.7 steals per game, and Harris contributed 10.3 points per game in 44 games. Meanwhile, Frank averaged 8.1 points and 4.2 rebounds per game, Ben McDonald averaged 7.6 points and 4.1 rebounds per game, Feitl provided with 6.5 points and 4.8 rebounds per game, Larry Smith contributed 6.4 points and 9.1 rebounds per game, but only appeared in just 20 games due to a right thigh injury, Hoppen averaged 5.9 points and 4.6 rebounds per game, and Jerome Whitehead provided with 5.7 points and 4.5 rebounds per game.

Garland finished tied in second place in Rookie of the Year voting, behind Mark Jackson of the New York Knicks. The Warriors finished 19th in the NBA in home-game attendance, with an attendance of 440,294 at the Oakland-Alameda County Coliseum Arena during the regular season, which was the fifth-lowest in the league.

=== Aftermath ===
Following the season, Feitl was traded to the Washington Bullets, while Hoppen was left unprotected in the 1988 NBA expansion draft, where he was selected by the Charlotte Hornets expansion team, and Harris was released to free agency.

== Draft picks ==
Round	Pick	Player	Position	Nationality	College
1	14	Tellis Frank	PF	United States	Western Kentucky
3	58	Darryl Johnson	PG	United States	Michigan State
4	83	Benny Bolton		United States	North Carolina State
5	105	Terry Williams		United States	Southern Methodist
6	127	Sarunas Marciulionis	SG	Lithuania	
7	152	Ronnie Leggette		United States	West Virginia State

== Roster ==
Golden State Warriors roster
Players

Pos.	No.	Player	Height	Weight	DOB	From
C	5	Dave Feitl	6 ft 11 in (2.11 m)	235 lb (107 kg)		UTEP
F	32	Tellis Frank	6 ft 10 in (2.08 m)	225 lb (102 kg)		Western Kentucky
G	12	Winston Garland	6 ft 2 in (1.88 m)	170 lb (77 kg)		Missouri State
G	11	Steve Harris	6 ft 5 in (1.96 m)	195 lb (88 kg)		Tulsa
F	22	Rod Higgins	6 ft 7 in (2.01 m)	200 lb (91 kg)		Fresno State
C	52	Dave Hoppen	6 ft 11 in (2.11 m)	235 lb (107 kg)		Nebraska
F	30	Ben McDonald	6 ft 8 in (2.03 m)	210 lb (95 kg)		UC Irvine
G/F	17	Chris Mullin	6 ft 6 in (1.98 m)	200 lb (91 kg)		St. John's
F/C	50	Ralph Sampson	7 ft 4 in (2.24 m)	228 lb (103 kg)		Virginia
F	13	Larry Smith	6 ft 8 in (2.03 m)	215 lb (98 kg)		Alcorn State
G/F	18	Otis Smith	6 ft 5 in (1.96 m)	210 lb (95 kg)		Jacksonville
G/F	20	Terry Teagle	6 ft 5 in (1.96 m)	195 lb (88 kg)		Baylor
G	4	Mark Wade	5 ft 11 in (1.80 m)	160 lb (73 kg)		UNLV
G	4	Tony White	6 ft 2 in (1.88 m)	170 lb (77 kg)		Tennessee
C	33	Jerome Whitehead	6 ft 10 in (2.08 m)	220 lb (100 kg)		Marquette

Coaches
Head coach
- Ed Gregory
Assistant(s)
- Herman Kull

Legend
- (DP) Unsigned draft pick
- (FA) Free agent
- (S) Suspended
- Injured

== Regular season ==
=== Season standings ===
Pacific Division	W	L	PCT	GB	Home	Road	Div
y-Los Angeles Lakers	62	20	.756	–	36–5	26–15	23–7
x-Portland Trail Blazers	53	29	.646	9	33–8	20–21	23–7
x-Seattle SuperSonics	44	38	.537	18	32–9	12–29	19–11
Phoenix Suns	28	54	.341	34	22–19	6–35	11–19
Golden State Warriors	20	62	.244	42	16–25	4–37	7–23
Los Angeles Clippers	17	65	.207	45	14–27	3–38	7–23

#	Western Conference				
#	Team	W	L	PCT	GB
1	z-Los Angeles Lakers	62	20	.756	–
2	y-Denver Nuggets	54	28	.659	8
3	x-Dallas Mavericks	53	29	.646	9
4	x-Portland Trail Blazers	53	29	.646	9
5	x-Utah Jazz	47	35	.573	15
6	x-Houston Rockets	46	36	.561	16
7	x-Seattle SuperSonics	44	38	.537	18
8	x-San Antonio Spurs	31	51	.378	31
9	Phoenix Suns	28	54	.341	34
10	Sacramento Kings	24	58	.293	38
11	Golden State Warriors	20	62	.244	42
12	Los Angeles Clippers	17	65	.207	45

z - clinched division title
y - clinched division title
x - clinched playoff spot

== Game log ==
=== Regular season ===
1987–88 game log
Total: 20–62 (Home: 16–25; Road: 4–37)
November: 0–0 (home: 0–0; road: 0–0)

Game	Date	Team	Score	High points	High rebounds	High assists	Location Attendance	Record
6	November 14, 1987; 7:30 pm PST	L.A. Lakers	L 110–118				Oakland-Alameda County Coliseum Arena; 15,025	1–5
9	November 20, 1987; 4:30 pm PST	@ Detroit	L 108–131				Pontiac Silverdome; 20,362	1–8

December: 0–0 (home: 0–0; road: 0–0)

Game	Date	Team	Score	High points	High rebounds	High assists	Location Attendance	Record
19	December 17, 1987; 7:30 pm PST	L.A. Lakers	L 106–113				Oakland-Alameda County Coliseum Arena; 15,025	3–16

January: 0–0 (home: 0–0; road: 0–0)

Game	Date	Team	Score	High points	High rebounds	High assists	Location Attendance	Record
29	January 12, 1988; 7:30 pm PST	@ L.A. Lakers	L 113–117				The Forum; 17,505	5–24

February: 0–0 (home: 0–0; road: 0–0)

Game	Date	Team	Score	High points	High rebounds	High assists	Location Attendance	Record
50	February 24, 1988; 7:30 pm PST	Detroit	L 93–107				Oakland-Alameda County Coliseum Arena; 14,340	14–36

March: 0–0 (home: 0–0; road: 0–0)

Game	Date	Team	Score	High points	High rebounds	High assists	Location Attendance	Record
55	March 4, 1988; 7:30 pm PST	@ L.A. Lakers	L 107–120				The Forum; 17,505	14–41
64	March 20, 1988; 7:30 pm PST	L.A. Lakers	L 106–113				Oakland-Alameda County Coliseum Arena; 15,025	16–48

April: 0–0 (home: 0–0; road: 0–0)

Game	Date	Team	Score	High points	High rebounds	High assists	Location Attendance	Record
82	April 24, 1988; 12:30 pm PDT	@ L.A. Lakers	L 100–136				The Forum; 17,505	20–62

1987–88 schedule

== Player statistics ==
Legend
GP	Games played	GS	Games started	MPG	Minutes per game
FG%	Field-goal percentage	3P%	3-point field-goal percentage	FT%	Free-throw percentage
RPG	Rebounds per game	APG	Assists per game	SPG	Steals per game
BPG	Blocks per game	PPG	Points per game

== See also ==
- 1987-88 NBA season
