= 1987–88 Los Angeles Clippers season =

NBA professional basketball team season

- Head coach: Gene Shue
- General manager: Elgin Baylor
- Owner: Donald Sterling
- Arena: Los Angeles Memorial Sports Arena

Results
- Record: 17–65 (.207)
- Place: Division: 6th (Pacific); Conference: 12th (Western)
- Playoff finish: Did not qualify
- Stats at Basketball Reference

Local media
- Television: KTLA (Ralph Lawler, Junior Bridgeman)
- Radio: KIIS (Pete Arbogast)

The 1987–88 Los Angeles Clippers season was the 18th season for the Los Angeles Clippers in the National Basketball Association, and their fourth season in Los Angeles, California.

== Season summary ==
=== Off-season ===
After finishing with a dreadful 12–70 record the previous season, the Clippers received the fourth overall pick in the 1987 NBA draft, and selected small forward Reggie Williams out of Georgetown University; the team also selected center Joe Wolf from the University of North Carolina with the 13th overall pick, and selected small forward Ken Norman from the University of Illinois with the 19th overall pick. During the off-season, the team hired Gene Shue as their new head coach. However, prior to the regular season, Norm Nixon ruptured his Achilles tendon in his right ankle during practice, and would miss the entire season for the second year in a row.

For the season, the Clippers redesigned their home and road uniforms, adding a blue, white and red trim; the white home uniforms featured red side panels with white and blue outlines on their jerseys and shorts, while the road uniforms were changed from blue to red, and featured white side panels with red and blue outlines. The team's new home uniforms would remain in use until 1989, while the new road uniforms only lasted for just one season, where they would change the jersey number from blue to white the following season.

=== Regular season ===
Under Shue and with the addition of Williams, Wolf and Norman, the Clippers got off to an 8–12 start to the regular season, but then posted an 11-game losing streak between December and January afterwards, and later on held a 10–32 record at the All-Star break. In February, the team signed free agent Greg Kite, who was previously released by the Boston Celtics, and later on signed rookie small forward Eric White in March. The team posted two seven-game losing streaks between January and February, then posted a 10-game losing streak in March, and lost their final seven games of the season. The Clippers finished in last place in the Pacific Division with a league-worst 17–65 record, and missed the NBA playoffs for the twelfth consecutive year.

Mike Woodson averaged 18.0 points, 3.4 assists and 1.4 steals per game, while Michael Cage averaged 14.5 points, 13.0 rebounds and 1.3 steals per game, and Quintin Dailey contributed 13.4 points per game. In addition, Benoit Benjamin provided the team with 13.0 points, 8.0 rebounds and 3.4 blocks per game, while White provided with 10.5 points and 3.6 rebounds per game in 17 games, Williams contributed 10.4 points per game, but only played just 35 games due to knee injuries, and Larry Drew averaged 10.3 points and 5.2 assists per game. Meanwhile, Norman averaged 8.6 points and 4.0 rebounds per game, Wolf provided with 7.6 points and 4.5 rebounds per game, but only appeared in just 42 games due to a right knee injury, Darnell Valentine contributed 7.1 points, 4.8 assists and 1.5 steals per game, Kite averaged 5.1 points, 6.0 rebounds and 1.3 blocks per game in 40 games, and Earl Cureton provided with 4.3 points and 3.9 rebounds per game.

The Clippers finished 22nd in the NBA in home-game attendance, with an attendance of 345,589 at the Los Angeles Memorial Sports Arena during the regular season, which was the second-lowest in the league.

=== Aftermath ===
Following the season, Woodson signed as a free agent with the Houston Rockets, while Cage was traded to the Seattle SuperSonics on draft day, and Drew left to play overseas in Italy. Meanwhile, Valentine was left unprotected in the 1988 NBA expansion draft, where he was selected by the Miami Heat expansion team, who then traded him to the Cleveland Cavaliers, Cureton signed with the Charlotte Hornets expansion team, and White was released to free agency.

== Draft picks ==
Round	Pick	Player	Position	Nationality	College
1	4	Reggie Williams	SF/SG	United States	Georgetown
1	13	Joe Wolf	C/PF	United States	North Carolina
1	19	Ken Norman	SF	United States	Illinois
2	38	Norris Coleman	F	United States	Kansas State
3	47	Tim McCalister	G	United States	Oklahoma
5	93	Chad Kessler	F	United States	Georgia
6	116	Martin Nessley	C	United States	Duke
7	139	Henry Carr	F	United States	Wichita State

== Roster ==
1987–88 Los Angeles Clippers roster
Players

Pos.	No.	Player	Height	Weight	DOB	From
C	00	Benoit Benjamin	7 ft 0 in (2.13 m)	250 lb (113 kg)		Creighton
G	15	Steve Burtt	6 ft 2 in (1.88 m)	195 lb (88 kg)		Iona
F/C	44	Michael Cage	6 ft 9 in (2.06 m)	235 lb (107 kg)		San Diego State
F	25	Earl Cureton	6 ft 9 in (2.06 m)	215 lb (98 kg)		Detroit Mercy
G	20	Quintin Dailey	6 ft 3 in (1.91 m)	180 lb (82 kg)		San Francisco
G	22	Larry Drew	6 ft 2 in (1.88 m)	190 lb (86 kg)		Missouri
F	43	Claude Gregory	6 ft 9 in (2.06 m)	235 lb (107 kg)		Wisconsin
C	32	Greg Kite	6 ft 11 in (2.11 m)	250 lb (113 kg)		BYU
G	10	Norm Nixon (injured) (IN)	6 ft 2 in (1.88 m)	170 lb (77 kg)		Duquesne
F	33	Ken Norman	6 ft 8 in (2.03 m)	215 lb (98 kg)		Illinois
G	1	Darnell Valentine	6 ft 1 in (1.85 m)	183 lb (83 kg)		Kansas
F	31	Eric White	6 ft 8 in (2.03 m)	200 lb (91 kg)		Pepperdine
F	34	Reggie Williams	6 ft 7 in (2.01 m)	190 lb (86 kg)		Georgetown
C	24	Joe Wolf	6 ft 11 in (2.11 m)	230 lb (104 kg)		North Carolina
G	42	Mike Woodson	6 ft 5 in (1.96 m)	198 lb (90 kg)		Indiana

Coaches
Head coach
- Gene Shue
Assistant(s)
- Don Casey

Legend
- (DP) Unsigned draft pick
- (FA) Free agent
- (S) Suspended
- Injured

=== Roster notes ===
- Point guard Larry Drew would later on serve as an assistant coach for the Clippers.
- This was shooting guard Kenny Fields' second tour of duty with the franchise after playing the first few months of the season in the CBA; he previously played for the team last season.
- Point guard Norm Nixon was on the injured reserve list due to a ruptured Achilles tendon in his right ankle, and missed the entire regular season.
- Shooting guard Mike Woodson would later on serve as an assistant coach for the Clippers from 2014 to 2018.

== Regular season ==
=== Season standings ===
Pacific Division	W	L	PCT	GB	Home	Road	Div
y-Los Angeles Lakers	62	20	.756	–	36–5	26–15	23–7
x-Portland Trail Blazers	53	29	.646	9	33–8	20–21	23–7
x-Seattle SuperSonics	44	38	.537	18	32–9	12–29	19–11
Phoenix Suns	28	54	.341	34	22–19	6–35	11–19
Golden State Warriors	20	62	.244	42	16–25	4–37	7–23
Los Angeles Clippers	17	65	.207	45	14–27	3–38	7–23

#	Western Conference				
#	Team	W	L	PCT	GB
1	z-Los Angeles Lakers	62	20	.756	–
2	y-Denver Nuggets	54	28	.659	8
3	x-Dallas Mavericks	53	29	.646	9
4	x-Portland Trail Blazers	53	29	.646	9
5	x-Utah Jazz	47	35	.573	15
6	x-Houston Rockets	46	36	.561	16
7	x-Seattle SuperSonics	44	38	.537	18
8	x-San Antonio Spurs	31	51	.378	31
9	Phoenix Suns	28	54	.341	34
10	Sacramento Kings	24	58	.293	38
11	Golden State Warriors	20	62	.244	42
12	Los Angeles Clippers	17	65	.207	45

z - clinched division title
y - clinched division title
x - clinched playoff spot

== Game log ==
=== Regular season ===
1987–88 game log
Total: 17–65 (Home: 14–27; Road: 3–38)
November: 0–0 (home: 0–0; road: 0–0)

Game	Date	Team	Score	High points	High rebounds	High assists	Location Attendance	Record
4	November 12, 1987; 7:30 pm PST	@ L.A. Lakers	L 82–111				The Forum; 15,569	1–3

December: 0–0 (home: 0–0; road: 0–0)

Game	Date	Team	Score	High points	High rebounds	High assists	Location Attendance	Record
21	December 19, 1987; 7:30 pm PST	L.A. Lakers	L 97–108				Los Angeles Memorial Sports Arena; 14,417	8–13

January: 0–0 (home: 0–0; road: 0–0)

Game	Date	Team	Score	High points	High rebounds	High assists	Location Attendance	Record
32	January 13, 1988; 7:30 pm PST	L.A. Lakers	W 110–109 (OT)				Los Angeles Memorial Sports Arena; 14,906	9–23

February: 0–0 (home: 0–0; road: 0–0)

Game	Date	Team	Score	High points	High rebounds	High assists	Location Attendance	Record
42	February 4, 1988; 7:30 pm PST	L.A. Lakers	L 86–117				Los Angeles Memorial Sports Arena; 15,371	10–32
47	February 16, 1988; 7:30 pm PST	@ L.A. Lakers	L 100–119				The Forum; 17,505	11–36

March: 0–0 (home: 0–0; road: 0–0)

Game	Date	Team	Score	High points	High rebounds	High assists	Location Attendance	Record
54	March 2, 1988; 4:30 pm PST	@ Detroit	L 90–103				Pontiac Silverdome; 16,554	12–42
68	March 28, 1988; 7:30 pm PST	Detroit	W 102–100				Los Angeles Memorial Sports Arena; 12,156	15–53

April: 0–0 (home: 0–0; road: 0–0)

Game	Date	Team	Score	High points	High rebounds	High assists	Location Attendance	Record
74	April 8, 1988; 7:30 pm PDT	@ L.A. Lakers	L 107–126				The Forum; 17,505	16–58

1987–88 schedule

== Player statistics ==
Legend
GP	Games played	GS	Games started	MPG	Minutes per game
FG%	Field-goal percentage	3P%	3-point field-goal percentage	FT%	Free-throw percentage
RPG	Rebounds per game	APG	Assists per game	SPG	Steals per game
BPG	Blocks per game	PPG	Points per game

Player	GP	GS	MPG	FG%	3FG%	FT%	RPG	APG	SPG	BPG	PPG
Benoit Benjamin											
Steve Burtt											
Michael Cage											
Norris Coleman											
Earl Cureton											
Quintin Dailey											
Larry Drew											
Kenny Fields											
Lancaster Gordon											
Claude Gregory											
Greg Kite											
Tod Murphy											
Martin Nessley											
Ken Norman											
Mike Phelps											
Darnell Valentine											
Eric White											
Reggie Williams											
Joe Wolf											
Mike Woodson											

== Awards, records and milestones ==
=== Awards ===
- Forward/center Michael Cage led the league in rebounding (13.0 rpg)

== Transactions ==
The Clippers were involved in the following transactions during the 1987–88 season.

=== Trades ===
No trades occurred for this team.

=== Free agents ===
==== Additions ==== : Player / Signed / Former team	==== Subtractions ==== : Player / Left / New team
