= 1987–88 Sacramento Kings season =

NBA professional basketball team season

- Head coach: Bill Russell; Jerry Reynolds
- Owners: Joseph Benvenuti; Gregg Lukenbill
- Arena: ARCO Arena I

Results
- Record: 24–58 (.293)
- Place: Division: 6th (Midwest); Conference: 10th (Western)
- Playoff finish: Did not qualify
- Stats at Basketball Reference

Local media
- Television: KOVR
- Radio: KFBK

The 1987–88 Sacramento Kings season was the 39th season for the Sacramento Kings in the National Basketball Association, and their third season in Sacramento, California.

== Season summary ==
=== Off-season ===
The Kings received the sixth overall pick in the 1987 NBA draft, and selected point guard Kenny Smith from the University of North Carolina. During the off-season, the team acquired Ed Pinckney from the Phoenix Suns, acquired Jawann Oldham from the New York Knicks, and later on acquired Mike McGee from the Atlanta Hawks in December. The Kings also hired retired All-Star center, and Boston Celtics legend Bill Russell as their new head coach.

=== Regular season ===
Under Russell, and with the addition of Kenny Smith and Pinckney, the Kings lost seven of their first nine games of the regular season, which included a six-game losing streak in November. The team posted an eight-game losing streak in December, and later on held a 14–29 record at the All-Star break. The Kings continued to struggle posting another eight-game losing streak between February and March; after holding a 17–41 record as of March 5, 1988, Russell was removed as head coach and became the team's General Manager, and was replaced with assistant coach Jerry Reynolds, who coached the Kings during the second half of the previous season as an interim coach. The Kings finished in last place in the Midwest Division with a 24–58 record.

Reggie Theus averaged 21.6 points and 6.3 assists per game, while Otis Thorpe averaged 20.8 points and 10.2 rebounds per game, and Kenny Smith provided the team with 13.8 points, 7.1 assists and 1.5 steals per game, and was named to the NBA All-Rookie Team. In addition, McGee provided with 14.2 points and 1.3 steals per game in 37 games after the trade, while Derek Smith contributed 12.7 points per game, but only played just 35 games due to knee injuries, Joe Kleine averaged 9.8 points and 7.1 rebounds per game, and second-year forward Harold Pressley averaged 9.7 points and 4.6 rebounds per game. Meanwhile, Franklin Edwards contributed 8.3 points and 5.8 assists per game, but only appeared in just 16 games, LaSalle Thompson provided with 8.0 points and 6.2 rebounds per game, Pinckney averaged 6.2 points and 2.9 rebounds per game, Terry Tyler contributed 5.5 points and 3.3 rebounds per game, and Oldham provided with 5.5 points, 5.6 rebounds and 2.0 blocks per game.

Kenny Smith finished tied in second place in Rookie of the Year voting, behind Mark Jackson of the New York Knicks. The Kings finished 21st in the NBA in home-game attendance, with an attendance of 423,653 at the ARCO Arena during the regular season, which was the third-lowest in the league.

=== Aftermath ===
This was also the Kings' final season in which they played their home games at the original ARCO Arena. Following the season, Theus was traded to the Atlanta Hawks before draft day, while Thorpe was traded to the Houston Rockets, and McGee was dealt to the New Jersey Nets. Meanwhile, Tyler signed as a free agent with the Dallas Mavericks, and Oldham and Edwards were both released to free agency.

== Draft picks ==
Round	Pick	Player	Position	Nationality	College
1	6	Kenny Smith	PG	United States	North Carolina
3	51	Sven Myer		Germany	Oregon
4	74	Joe Arlauckas	PF	United States	Niagara
5	97	Vernon Carr		United States	Michigan State
6	120	Daryl Thomas		United States	Indiana
7	143	Scott Adubato		United States	Upsala College

== Roster ==
1987–88 Sacramento Kings roster
Players

Pos.	No.	Player	Height	Weight	DOB	From
G	31	Conner Henry	6 ft 7 in (2.01 m)	195 lb (88 kg)		UC Santa Barbara
G	2	Michael Jackson	6 ft 2 in (1.88 m)	183 lb (83 kg)		Georgetown
C	35	Joe Kleine	6 ft 11 in (2.11 m)	255 lb (116 kg)		Arkansas
G/F	25	Mike McGee	6 ft 5 in (1.96 m)	190 lb (86 kg)		Michigan
C	51	Martin Nessley	7 ft 2 in (2.18 m)	260 lb (118 kg)		Duke
C	32	Jawann Oldham	7 ft 0 in (2.13 m)	215 lb (98 kg)		Seattle
F	54	Ed Pinckney	6 ft 9 in (2.06 m)	195 lb (88 kg)		Villanova
F	21	Harold Pressley	6 ft 7 in (2.01 m)	210 lb (95 kg)		Villanova
G/F	18	Derek Smith	6 ft 6 in (1.98 m)	205 lb (93 kg)		Louisville
G	30	Kenny Smith	6 ft 3 in (1.91 m)	170 lb (77 kg)		North Carolina
G	24	Reggie Theus	6 ft 7 in (2.01 m)	190 lb (86 kg)		UNLV
C	41	LaSalle Thompson	6 ft 10 in (2.08 m)	245 lb (111 kg)		Texas
F/C	33	Otis Thorpe	6 ft 9 in (2.06 m)	225 lb (102 kg)		Providence
F	40	Terry Tyler	6 ft 7 in (2.01 m)	215 lb (98 kg)		Detroit Mercy

Coaches
Head coach
- Jerry Reynolds
Assistant(s)
- Phil Johnson

Legend
- (DP) Unsigned draft pick
- (FA) Free agent
- (S) Suspended
- Injured

== Regular season ==
=== Season standings ===
Midwest Division	W	L	PCT	GB	Home	Road	Div
y-Denver Nuggets	54	28	.659	–	35–6	19–22	18–12
x-Dallas Mavericks	53	29	.646	1	33–8	20–21	20–10
x-Utah Jazz	47	35	.573	7	33–8	14–27	18–12
x-Houston Rockets	46	36	.561	8	31–10	15–26	13–17
x-San Antonio Spurs	31	51	.378	23	23–18	8–33	12–18
Sacramento Kings	24	58	.293	30	19–22	5–36	9–21

#	Western Conference				
#	Team	W	L	PCT	GB
1	z-Los Angeles Lakers	62	20	.756	–
2	y-Denver Nuggets	54	28	.659	8
3	x-Dallas Mavericks	53	29	.646	9
4	x-Portland Trail Blazers	53	29	.646	9
5	x-Utah Jazz	47	35	.573	15
6	x-Houston Rockets	46	36	.561	16
7	x-Seattle SuperSonics	44	38	.537	18
8	x-San Antonio Spurs	31	51	.378	31
9	Phoenix Suns	28	54	.341	34
10	Sacramento Kings	24	58	.293	38
11	Golden State Warriors	20	62	.244	42
12	Los Angeles Clippers	17	65	.207	45

z - clinched division title
y - clinched division title
x - clinched playoff spot

== Game log ==
=== Regular season ===
1987–88 game log
Total: 24–58 (Home: 19–22; Road: 5–36)
November: 0–0 (home: 0–0; road: 0–0)

Game	Date	Team	Score	High points	High rebounds	High assists	Location Attendance	Record

December: 0–0 (home: 0–0; road: 0–0)

Game	Date	Team	Score	High points	High rebounds	High assists	Location Attendance	Record
12	December 1, 1987; 7:30 pm PST	L.A. Lakers	L 120–125 (OT)				ARCO Arena; 10,333	4–8
24	December 23, 1987; 7:30 pm PST	@ L.A. Lakers	L 103–117				The Forum; 17,505	6–18

January: 0–0 (home: 0–0; road: 0–0)

Game	Date	Team	Score	High points	High rebounds	High assists	Location Attendance	Record
39	January 28, 1988; 7:30 pm PST	L.A. Lakers	L 94–115				ARCO Arena; 10,333	11–28

February: 0–0 (home: 0–0; road: 0–0)

Game	Date	Team	Score	High points	High rebounds	High assists	Location Attendance	Record
52	February 23, 1988; 7:30 pm PST	Detroit	L 105–121				ARCO Arena; 10,333	16–36

March: 0–0 (home: 0–0; road: 0–0)

Game	Date	Team	Score	High points	High rebounds	High assists	Location Attendance	Record
62	March 14, 1988; 4:30 pm PST	@ Detroit	L 97–109				Pontiac Silverdome; 16,909	18–44
68	March 26, 1988; 7:30 pm PST	L.A. Lakers	W 114–92				ARCO Arena; 10,333	20–48

April: 0–0 (home: 0–0; road: 0–0)

Game	Date	Team	Score	High points	High rebounds	High assists	Location Attendance	Record
72	April 3, 1988; 7:30 pm PDT	@ L.A. Lakers	L 104–108				The Forum; 17,505	20–52

1987–88 schedule

== Player statistics ==
Legend
GP	Games played	GS	Games started	MPG	Minutes per game
FG%	Field-goal percentage	3P%	3-point field-goal percentage	FT%	Free-throw percentage
RPG	Rebounds per game	APG	Assists per game	SPG	Steals per game
BPG	Blocks per game	PPG	Points per game

Player	GP	GS	MPG	FG%	3FG%	FT%	RPG	APG	SPG	BPG	PPG

== Awards and records ==
- Kenny Smith, NBA All-Rookie Team 1st Team

== See also ==
- 1987-88 NBA season
