= 1987–88 Houston Rockets season =

- Head coach: Bill Fitch
- General manager: Ray Patterson
- Owner: Charlie Thomas
- Arena: The Summit

Results
- Record: 46–36 (.561)
- Place: Division: 4th (Midwest); Conference: 6th (Western)
- Playoff finish: First round (lost to Mavericks 1–3)
- Stats at Basketball Reference

Local media
- Television: KTXH; Home Sports Entertainment
- Radio: KTRH

The 1987–88 Houston Rockets season was the 21st season for the Houston Rockets in the National Basketball Association, and their 17th season in Houston, Texas.

== Season summary ==
=== Off-season ===
During the off-season, the Rockets signed free agents, former All-Star guard World B. Free and Lester Conner.

=== Regular season ===
The Rockets made two separate trades with the Golden State Warriors. Shortly before the start of the regular season in early November, the team traded Dave Feitl to the Warriors in exchange for Purvis Short, then in December, traded All-Star center Ralph Sampson, and Steve Harris in exchange for All-Star guard Sleepy Floyd, and All-Star center Joe Barry Carroll; Sampson and head coach Bill Fitch both feuded with each other during the season, which resulted in the trade. Before the trade, Sampson averaged 15.9 points, 9.1 rebounds and 1.7 blocks per game in 19 games, while Harris contributed 5.9 points per game in 14 games. The Rockets got off to a 7–6 start in November, and later on held a 25–17 record at the All-Star break. The team won 9 of their 13 games in February, finished in fourth place in the Midwest Division with a 46–36 record, and earned the sixth seed in the Western Conference.

Akeem Olajuwon averaged 22.8 points, 12.1 rebounds, 2.1 steals and 2.7 blocks per game, and was named to the All-NBA First Team, and to the NBA All-Defensive First Team. In addition, Short played a sixth man role off the bench, averaging 14.3 points per game, while Floyd provided the team with 13.1 points and 6.2 assists per game in 59 games after the trade, Barry Carroll contributed 12.0 points, 6.3 rebounds and 1.3 blocks per game off the bench in 63 games, and Rodney McCray provided with 12.4 points and 7.8 rebounds per game, and was also named to the NBA All-Defensive First Team. Meanwhile, Allen Leavell averaged 10.2 points, 5.1 assists and 1.6 steals per game, Jim Petersen provided with 8.9 points and 6.3 rebounds per game, Free contributed 6.4 points per game, and Robert Reid contributed 6.3 points per game.

During the NBA All-Star weekend at the Chicago Stadium in Chicago, Illinois, Olajuwon was selected for the 1988 NBA All-Star Game, as a member of the Western Conference All-Star team. Olajuwon scored 21 points along with 9 rebounds, 2 steals and 2 blocks, despite the Western Conference losing to the Eastern Conference, 138–133. He finished in third place in Defensive Player of the Year voting, and also finished in seventh place in Most Valuable Player voting.

The Rockets finished fifth in the NBA in home-game attendance, with an attendance of 681,051 at The Summit during the regular season.

=== NBA playoffs ===
In the Western Conference First Round of the 1988 NBA playoffs, the Rockets faced off against the 3rd–seeded Dallas Mavericks, a team that featured the quartet of All-Star forward Mark Aguirre, Rolando Blackman, Derek Harper and All-Star center James Donaldson. The Rockets lost Game 1 to the Mavericks on the road, 120–110 at the Reunion Arena, but managed to win Game 2 on the road, 119–108 to even the series; in Game 2, Floyd finished with 42 points and 9 assists, while Olajuwon contributed 41 points, 26 rebounds and 4 blocks. However, the Rockets lost the next two games at home, which included a Game 4 loss to the Mavericks at The Summit, 107–97, thus losing the series in four games.

=== Aftermath ===
Following the season, Fitch was fired as head coach, while Barry Carroll and Conner were both traded to the New Jersey Nets, and McCray and Petersen were both traded to the Sacramento Kings. Meanwhile, Reid was dealt to the Charlotte Hornets expansion team, and Free retired.

== Draft picks ==
Round	Pick	Player	Position	Nationality	College/Club team
2	35	Doug Lee	SG/SF	United States	Purdue
4	82	Josh Niego		United States	Lewis
5	104	Andre LaFleur		United States	Northeastern
6	129	Fred Jenkins		United States	Tennessee
7	151	Clarence Grier		United States	Campbell

== Roster ==
Houston Rockets roster
Players

Pos.	No.	Player	Height	Weight	DOB	From
C	2	Joe Barry Carroll	7 ft 0 in (2.13 m)	225 lb (102 kg)	1958-07-24	Purdue
PG	7	Lester Conner	6 ft 4 in (1.93 m)	180 lb (82 kg)	1959-09-17	Oregon State
PG	11	Sleepy Floyd	6 ft 3 in (1.91 m)	170 lb (77 kg)	1960-03-06	Georgetown
SG	21	World B. Free	6 ft 2 in (1.88 m)	185 lb (84 kg)	1953-12-09	Guilford
SF	1	Buck Johnson	6 ft 7 in (2.01 m)	190 lb (86 kg)	1964-01-03	Alabama
SG	30	Allen Leavell	6 ft 1 in (1.85 m)	170 lb (77 kg)	1957-05-27	Oklahoma City
SF	18	Cedric Maxwell	6 ft 8 in (2.03 m)	205 lb (93 kg)	1955-11-21	Charlotte
SF	22	Rodney McCray	6 ft 7 in (2.01 m)	220 lb (100 kg)	1961-08-29	Louisville
C	34	Akeem Olajuwon	7 ft 0 in (2.13 m)	255 lb (116 kg)	1963-01-21	Houston
PF	43	Jim Petersen	6 ft 10 in (2.08 m)	235 lb (107 kg)	1962-02-22	Minnesota
SG	33	Robert Reid	6 ft 8 in (2.03 m)	205 lb (93 kg)	1955-08-30	Saint Mary's
SF	10	Purvis Short	6 ft 7 in (2.01 m)	210 lb (95 kg)	1957-07-02	Jackson State
PG	13	Andre Turner	5 ft 11 in (1.80 m)	160 lb (73 kg)	1964-12-13	Memphis

Coaches
Head coach
- Bill Fitch
Assistant(s)
- Carroll Dawson
- Rudy Tomjanovich

Legend
- (DP) Unsigned draft pick
- (FA) Free agent
- (S) Suspended
- Injured

Roster
Updated: December 13, 1987

== Regular season ==
=== Season standings ===
Midwest Division	W	L	PCT	GB	Home	Road	Div
y-Denver Nuggets	54	28	.659	–	35–6	19–22	18–12
x-Dallas Mavericks	53	29	.646	1	33–8	20–21	20–10
x-Utah Jazz	47	35	.573	7	33–8	14–27	18–12
x-Houston Rockets	46	36	.561	8	31–10	15–26	13–17
x-San Antonio Spurs	31	51	.378	23	23–18	8–33	12–18
Sacramento Kings	24	58	.293	30	19–22	5–36	9–21

#	Western Conference				
#	Team	W	L	PCT	GB
1	z-Los Angeles Lakers	62	20	.756	–
2	y-Denver Nuggets	54	28	.659	8
3	x-Dallas Mavericks	53	29	.646	9
4	x-Portland Trail Blazers	53	29	.646	9
5	x-Utah Jazz	47	35	.573	15
6	x-Houston Rockets	46	36	.561	16
7	x-Seattle SuperSonics	44	38	.537	18
8	x-San Antonio Spurs	31	51	.378	31
9	Phoenix Suns	28	54	.341	34
10	Sacramento Kings	24	58	.293	38
11	Golden State Warriors	20	62	.244	42
12	Los Angeles Clippers	17	65	.207	45

z – clinched division title
y – clinched division title
x – clinched playoff spot

== Game log ==
=== Regular season ===
1987–88 game log
Total: 46–36 (home: 31–10; road: 15–26)
November: 7–6 (home: 3–2; road: 4–4)

Game	Date	Team	Score	High points	High rebounds	High assists	Location Attendance	Record
2	November 8; 9:30 p.m. CST	@ L.A. Lakers	L 92–101	Olajuwon (26)	Olajuwon (11)	Conner, Leavell (4)	The Forum; 17,505	1–1
5	November 14; 7:30 p.m. CST	Utah	W 101–93	Olajuwon (19)	Olajuwon (16)	Leavell, Maxwell (3)	The Summit; 16,614	4–1
9	November 21; 6:30 p.m. CST	@ Atlanta	L 94–104	Olajuwon (17)	Sampson (9)	Leavell, McCray (7)	The Omni; 16,451	6–3
10	November 24; 7:00 p.m. CST	Detroit	L 83–97	Olajuwon (21)	Olajuwon (15)	Short (5)	The Summit; 16,611	6–4
12	November 27; 8:30 p.m. CST	@ Utah	L 96–118	Sampson (19)	Sampson (11)	Conner, McCray (3)	Salt Palace; 12,212	7–5

December: 7–6 (home: 5–1; road: 2–5)

Game	Date	Team	Score	High points	High rebounds	High assists	Location Attendance	Record
18	December 10; 7:30 p.m. CST	Utah	W 98–93	Leavell (20)	Olajuwon (14)	Leavell (8)	The Summit; 16,611	11–7
23	December 22; 7:30 p.m. CST	Atlanta	W 122–103	Floyd (27)	McCray, Olajuwon (13)	McCray (9)	The Summit; 16,611	12–11
24	December 26; 7:30 p.m. CST	@ Dallas	L 100–105	Olajuwon (24)	Olajuwon (14)	Leavell (7)	Reunion Arena; 17,007	12–12
25	December 29; 6:30 p.m. CST	@ Detroit	W 101–91	Carroll (25)	Olajuwon (14)	Floyd (6)	Pontiac Silverdome; 26,498	13–12

January: 9–5 (home: 6–1; road: 3–4)

Game	Date	Team	Score	High points	High rebounds	High assists	Location Attendance	Record
28	January 4; 7:30 p.m. CST	Dallas	W 117–107	Olajuwon (31)	Olajuwon (11)	Floyd (11)	The Summit; 16,611	16–12
35	January 18; 4:00 p.m. CST	@ L.A. Lakers	L 110–121	Olajuwon (24)	Olajuwon (9)	Floyd (7)	The Forum; 17,505	20–15
40	January 30; 7:30 p.m. CST	@ Dallas	W 108–92	Olajuwon (29)	McCray (12)	Floyd (8)	Reunion Arena; 17,007	23–17

February: 9–4 (home: 7–2; road: 2–2)

Game	Date	Team	Score	High points	High rebounds	High assists	Location Attendance	Record
All-Star Break
43	February 9; 7:30 p.m. CST	Boston	W 129–120	Olajuwon (30)	Olajuwon (16)	Floyd (7)	The Summit; 16,611	26–17
48	February 18; 7:30 p.m. CST	L.A. Lakers	L 96–111	Olajuwon (20)	Olajuwon (20)	Floyd (6)	The Summit; 16,611	29–19
51	February 25; 7:30 p.m. CST	Dallas	L 106–108	Floyd (22)	McCray (13)	Floyd (11)	The Summit; 16,611	31–20

March: 9–7 (home: 6–1; road: 3–6)

Game	Date	Team	Score	High points	High rebounds	High assists	Location Attendance	Record
54	March 1; 8:30 p.m. CST	@ Utah	L 112–113	Olajuwon (27)	McCray (13)	Short (5)	Salt Palace; 12,444	32–22
56	March 4; 7:00 p.m. CST	@ Dallas	L 110–118	Olajuwon, Short (22)	Olajuwon (12)	Leavell, Reid (7)	Reunion Arena; 17,007	33–23
64	March 22; 9:30 p.m. CST	@ L.A. Lakers	L 95–117	Carroll (16)	Olajuwon (10)	Leavell (6)	The Forum; 17,505	38–26
68	March 30; 6:30 p.m. CST	@ Boston	L 110–117	Johnson (18)	McCray (10)	Floyd, Short (5)	Boston Garden; 14,890	40–28

April: 5–8 (home: 4–3; road: 1–5)

Game	Date	Team	Score	High points	High rebounds	High assists	Location Attendance	Record
72	April 7; 7:30 p.m. CDT	Utah	W 113–107	Olajuwon (22)	Olajuwon (15)	Olajuwon (6)	The Summit; 16,611	42–30
78	April 17; 12 Noon CDT	L.A. Lakers	W 127–119	Olajuwon (38)	Carroll (10)	Floyd (9)	The Summit; 16,611	45–33
79	April 19; 7:30 p.m. CDT	Dallas	L 96–104	Olajuwon (33)	Olajuwon (9)	Floyd (8)	The Summit; 16,611	45–34
81	April 23; 8:30 p.m. CDT	@ Utah	L 107–125	Carroll (24)	Olajuwon (12)	Floyd (7)	Salt Palace; 12,444	45–36

1987–88 schedule

== Playoffs ==
1988 playoff game log
Western Conference First Round: 1–3 (home: 0–2; road: 1–1)

Game	Date	Team	Score	High points	High rebounds	High assists	Location Attendance	Series
1	April 28; 7:30 p.m. CDT	@ Dallas	L 110–120	Olajuwon (34)	Olajuwon (14)	Floyd (11)	Reunion Arena; 17,007	0–1
2	April 30; 2:30 p.m. CDT	@ Dallas	W 119–108	Floyd (42)	Olajuwon (26)	Floyd (9)	Reunion Arena; 17,007	1–1
3	May 3; 7:30 p.m. CDT	Dallas	L 92–93	Olajuwon (35)	Olajuwon (12)	Floyd (5)	The Summit; 16,611	1–2
4	May 5; 7:00 p.m. CDT	Dallas	L 97–107	Olajuwon (40)	Olajuwon (15)	Floyd (9)	The Summit; 16,611	1–3

1988 schedule

== Player statistics ==
Legend
GP	Games played	GS	Games started	MPG	Minutes per game
FG%	Field-goal percentage	3P%	3-point field-goal percentage	FT%	Free-throw percentage
RPG	Rebounds per game	APG	Assists per game	SPG	Steals per game
BPG	Blocks per game	PPG	Points per game

=== Season ===
Player	GP	GS	MPG	FG%	3FG%	FT%	RPG	APG	SPG	BPG	PPG

=== Playoffs ===
Player	GP	GS	MPG	FG%	3FG%	FT%	RPG	APG	SPG	BPG	PPG

== Awards and records ==
- Akeem Olajuwon, All-NBA First Team
- Akeem Olajuwon, NBA All-Defensive First Team
- Rodney McCray, NBA All-Defensive First Team
