= Ricky Pierce =

American basketball player (born 1959)

Personal information
- Born: August 19, 1959 (age 67) Dallas, Texas, U.S.
- Listed height: 6 ft 4 in (1.93 m)
- Listed weight: 215 lb (98 kg)

Career information
- High school: Garland (Garland, Texas)
- College: Walla Walla CC (1978–1979); Rice (1979–1982)
- NBA draft: 1982: 1st round, 18th overall pick
- Drafted by: Detroit Pistons
- Playing career: 1982–1998
- Position: Shooting guard / small forward
- Number: 22, 25, 21

Career history
- 1982–1983: Detroit Pistons
- 1983–1984: San Diego Clippers
- 1984–1991: Milwaukee Bucks
- 1991–1994: Seattle SuperSonics
- 1994–1995: Golden State Warriors
- 1995–1996: Indiana Pacers
- 1996–1997: Denver Nuggets
- 1997: Charlotte Hornets
- 1997: AEK Athens
- 1997–1998: Milwaukee Bucks

Career highlights
- NBA All-Star (1991); 2× NBA Sixth Man of the Year (1987, 1990); Second-team All-American – USBWA (1982); Third-team All-American – AP, NABC (1982); SWC Player of the Year (1982); 3× First-team All-SWC (1980–1982); No. 25 retired by Rice Owls

Career NBA statistics
- Points: 14,467 (14.9 ppg)
- Rebounds: 2,296 (2.4 rpg)
- Assists: 1,826 (1.9 apg)
- Stats at NBA.com
- Stats at Basketball Reference

Richard Charles Pierce (born August 19, 1959) is an American former professional basketball player. Nicknamed "Deuces" and "Big Paper Daddy", he was selected as an NBA All-Star (1991) and was twice the NBA Sixth Man of the Year (1987, 1990) while with the Milwaukee Bucks of the National Basketball Association (NBA).

== Career beginnings ==
Pierce graduated from Garland High School in Dallas County, Texas. He later played basketball at Walla Walla Community College and Rice University.

Pierce is first in Rice history in career scoring average at 22.5 points per game, while he is third all time in total points scored and second in total field goals made. His 1981–82 season of 26.8 points, 314 field goals made, and 614 field goals attempted are also school single season records.

== NBA ==
=== Detroit Pistons ===
Pierce was drafted by the Detroit Pistons in the 1st round (18th pick) of the 1982 NBA draft. Used sparingly in his rookie season, he was traded to the San Diego Clippers immediately prior to the 1983-84 NBA season for two future 2nd-round draft picks.

=== San Diego Clippers ===
Pierce became a rotation regular during his one season with the Clippers, averaging 9.9 points and 18.6 minutes per game. He started 35 games during the season, highlighted by a then-career-high 30-point performance against San Antonio in his first start as a Clipper.

=== Milwaukee Bucks ===
Pierce was traded by the San Diego Clippers before the 1984–85 season along with Terry Cummings to the Milwaukee Bucks. The trade, which also brought Craig Hodges to Milwaukee, while sending veterans Junior Bridgeman and Marques Johnson (both would eventually have their jerseys retired in Milwaukee) to the Clippers, is viewed as having worked much better for the Bucks than the Clippers.

Pierce was reunited with his coach at Rice, Mike Schuler, who was then an assistant coach for the Bucks. Pierce would go on to average 17 points per game over the next 6 full seasons in Milwaukee, despite starting only 46 games in that time.

On March 13, 1985, Pierce scored 22 points, grabbed 9 rebounds, and recorded 6 assists in a win against the Cleveland Cavaliers. Pierce and the Bucks would go on to beat Michael Jordan and the Bulls 3–1 in the first round of the playoffs, before being upset by the lower seeded Philadelphia 76ers in the Eastern Conference Semifinals.

Pierce won the NBA Sixth Man of the Year Award for 1986–87 for averaging 19.5 points per game with a 53.4% shooting percentage in his third season with the Bucks. That same postseason, on May 8, 1987, Pierce led the Bucks with 29 points off the bench in a Game 3 victory against Boston Celtics, however, Boston would ultimately win the series. During the 1989 NBA Playoffs, on May 2, Pierce led the Bucks to 117-113 Game 3 victory over the Atlanta Hawks with a team-high 35 points. The Bucks would win the series 3–2, before being eliminated in the next round by the eventual-champion Pistons.

The following season, Pierce earned the Sixth Man award again, averaging 23.0 points per game without starting a single one (an NBA record) in 1989–90. That season, on November 9, 1989, Pierce played a key role in the longest game in the shot clock era, at four hours and 17 minutes, scoring a team leading 36 points on 15 of 21 shooting, during a 155-154 5OT win. On December 5, Pierce scored a career-high 45 points in a loss against the Sacramento Kings. In the week preceding the 1991 trade deadline, the Bucks traded Pierce to the Seattle SuperSonics for Dale Ellis.

When asked about referring to himself as a “hired gun” in relation to being a designated scorer who bounced around on several teams, Pierce said “The teams would let you know that you were hired to play a certain role. That was the role that I took on, my strength, my scoring ability. That was what I focused on. One time, in the middle of a game, I was passing the ball a lot. Coach Don Nelson called a timeout. He told me ‘I have Paul Pressey to pass. Your job is to score the ball.’ I thought that was kind of cool. I really liked that.”

=== Seattle Supersonics ===
Pierce became a regular starter in the 1991–92 season, his first full season with the Sonics. He made 75 consecutive free throws over several games in November and December 1991, the second-longest such streak at that time. The same year, in 1992, Pierce led Seattle in scoring during both the regular and postseason. In the 1993 NBA playoffs, Pierce led the Sonics to a 103-100 Game 7 win in the conference semifinals over the Houston Rockets with a game-leading 25 points. In the next round, Pierce, alongside teammates Gary Payton and Shawn Kemp, lost in seven games to the Phoenix Suns, narrowly missing an NBA Finals appearance. Pierce returned to the bench for 1993–94 following Seattle's off-season acquisition of Kendall Gill.

=== Golden State Warriors ===
On July 18, 1994, Pierce was traded along with Carlos Rogers and two draft picks to the Golden State Warriors in exchange for Byron Houston and Sarunas Marciulionis. Pierce battled foot and back injuries during the season and was only able to see action in 27 games.

=== Indiana Pacers ===
Prior to the 1995–96 season, Pierce signed with the Indiana Pacers as an unrestricted free agent. Healthy once more, Pierce appeared in 76 games, and after starting only 2 games all season, he started 4 of the Pacers' 5 first round playoff games, contributing 10.2 points and 3.0 assists per game.

=== Denver Nuggets ===
Indiana traded Pierce to the Denver Nuggets before the start of 1996–97 season, sending Mark Jackson and a 1st-round draft pick to the Nuggets in exchange for Jalen Rose, Reggie Williams, and the Nuggets' 1st-round pick. In February, with the Nuggets out of the playoff picture, Pierce was traded to the Charlotte Hornets for Anthony Goldwire and George Zidek.

=== Charlotte Hornets ===
Pierce played an expanded role with the playoff-bound Hornets, starting 17 of the final 29 games and averaging 12 points per game. In the playoffs, Pierce started the first 2 games of the Hornets' series with the New York Knicks and contributed 11 points off the bench in the third, which would be his final playoff game as a player.

=== AEK BC Athens, return to the Bucks and retirement ===
Without a contract for the 1997–98 season, Pierce signed to play with AEK B.C. Athens, a Greek professional team and one of the best in the country. Pierce played five games with AEK before signing as a free agent with the Milwaukee Bucks in December 1997. On December 19, Pierce scored 13 points in a 92–91 loss against the Toronto Raptors. He retired from basketball at the end of the season.

== NBA career statistics ==
Legend
GP	Games played	GS	Games started	MPG	Minutes per game
FG%	Field goal percentage	3P%	3-point field goal percentage	FT%	Free throw percentage
RPG	Rebounds per game	APG	Assists per game	SPG	Steals per game
BPG	Blocks per game	PPG	Points per game	**Bold**	Career high

=== Regular season ===
Year	Team	GP	GS	MPG	FG%	3P%	FT%	RPG	APG	SPG	BPG	PPG
1982–83	Detroit	39	1	6.8	.375	.143	.563	.9	.4	.2	.1	2.2
1983–84	San Diego	69	35	18.6	.470	.000	.861	2.0	.9	.4	.2	9.9
1984–85	Milwaukee	44	3	20.0	.537	.250	.823	2.7	2.1	.8	.1	9.8
1985–86	Milwaukee	**81**	8	26.5	**.538**	.130	.858	2.9	2.2	1.0	.1	13.9
1986–87	Milwaukee	79	31	31.7	.534	.107	.880	**3.4**	1.8	.8	**.3**	19.5
1987–88	Milwaukee	37	0	26.1	.510	.214	.877	2.2	2.0	.6	.2	16.4
1988–89	Milwaukee	75	4	27.7	.518	.222	.859	2.6	2.1	1.0	**.3**	17.6
1989–90	Milwaukee	59	0	29.0	.510	.346	.839	2.8	2.3	.8	.1	**23.0**
1990–91	Milwaukee	46	0	28.8	.499	.398	.907	2.5	2.1	.8	.2	22.5
1990–91	Seattle	32	0	26.3	.463	.391	**.925**	2.3	2.3	.7	.1	17.5
1991–92	Seattle	78	**78**	**34.1**	.475	.268	.916	3.0	**3.1**	1.1	**.3**	21.7
1992–93	Seattle	77	72	28.8	.489	.372	.889	2.5	2.9	**1.3**	.1	18.2
1993–94	Seattle	51	0	20.0	.471	.188	.896	1.6	1.8	.8	.1	14.5
1994–95	Golden State	27	6	24.9	.437	.329	.877	2.4	1.5	.8	.1	12.5
1995–96	Indiana	76	2	18.5	.447	.337	.849	1.8	1.3	.8	.1	9.7
1996–97	Denver	33	10	18.2	.462	.308	.902	1.6	.9	.4	.2	10.2
1996–97	Charlotte	27	17	24.1	.502	**.536**	.889	2.5	1.8	.5	.1	12.0
1997–98	Milwaukee	39	0	11.3	.364	.308	.827	1.2	.9	.2	.0	3.9
Career		969	269	24.4	.493	.322	.875	2.4	1.9	.8	.2	14.9
All-Star		1	0	19.0	.500	–	1.000	2.0	2.0	.0	.0	9.0

=== Playoffs ===
Year	Team	GP	GS	MPG	FG%	3P%	FT%	RPG	APG	SPG	BPG	PPG
1985	Milwaukee	8	1	24.8	.493	.000	.778	2.3	1.9	.4	.1	9.9
1986	Milwaukee	13	0	24.8	.460	.000	.889	**2.8**	1.5	.6	.2	11.1
1987	Milwaukee	12	2	26.4	.479	–	.821	2.3	1.3	.8	**.4**	15.9
1988	Milwaukee	5	0	21.0	.472	.200	.889	**2.8**	1.8	.2	**.4**	11.8
1989	Milwaukee	9	0	32.4	**.546**	**.750**	.872	**2.8**	2.8	1.2	.2	**22.3**
1990	Milwaukee	4	0	30.5	.467	.500	.903	2.3	1.5	1.3	.0	**22.3**
1991	Seattle	5	0	22.4	.333	.300	**.941**	**2.8**	.8	.8	.2	11.4
1992	Seattle	9	9	**35.1**	.481	.273	.870	2.4	**3.1**	.6	.1	19.6
1993	Seattle	**19**	**19**	30.4	.456	.400	.898	2.4	2.2	.6	.2	17.7
1994	Seattle	5	0	14.8	.452	–	.706	1.0	.6	.2	.0	8.0
1996	Indiana	5	4	26.6	.340	.250	.850	.8	3.0	**1.6**	.2	10.2
1997	Charlotte	3	2	29.0	.458	.143	–	2.7	1.3	.7	.0	7.7
Career		97	37	27.4	.466	.355	.866	2.4	1.9	.7	.2	14.9

== Post-playing career ==
Since retiring, Pierce has developed his own basketball system that assists with shooting accuracy with specially designed fingertip-placement markers. Pierce developed the idea after watching his son, Aron, playing basketball at the YMCA. Pierce was giving advice to parents on how to teach their kids the perfect jump shot. A product would later be developed known as the Accushot22, a specially designed basketball with 10 oval indentations. The product sells for $37.95, although hundreds are given away free to underprivileged children.

In 2015, Pierce was inducted into the Southwest Conference Hall of Fame, becoming only the third Rice basketball player to be inducted.

== Personal life ==
Pierce is a Christian. Pierce is married to Joyce Pierce. They have three children.

Pierce returned to Rice University to complete his degree, and graduated with a Bachelor of Arts in kinesiology in May 2012.

== See also ==
- List of National Basketball Association career free throw percentage leaders
