= Jerry Reynolds (basketball, born 1962) =

American basketball player (born 1962)

Personal information
- Born: December 23, 1962 (age 63) Brooklyn, New York, U.S.
- Listed height: 6 ft 8 in (2.03 m)
- Listed weight: 200 lb (91 kg)

Career information
- High school: Alexander Hamilton (Brooklyn, New York)
- College: LSU (1982–1985)
- NBA draft: 1985: 1st round, 22nd overall pick
- Drafted by: Milwaukee Bucks
- Playing career: 1985–2001
- Position: Shooting guard / small forward
- Number: 35, 44

Career history
- 1985–1988: Milwaukee Bucks
- 1988–1989: Seattle SuperSonics
- 1989–1993: Orlando Magic
- 1995: Atlanta Trojans
- 1995: Connecticut Pride
- 1995–1996: Milwaukee Bucks
- 1996–1997: Polti Cantù
- 1997: Connecticut Pride
- 1997: Gigantes de Carolina
- 1997–1998: Fontanafredda Siena
- 1999: Indios de Mayagüez
- 2000: Brooklyn Kings
- 2000: Achilleas
- 2001: Florida Sea Dragons

Career highlights
- Second-team All-SEC (1984)

Career NBA statistics
- Points: 4,036 (9.1 ppg)
- Rebounds: 1,317 (3.0 rpg)
- Assists: 904 (2.0 apg)
- Stats at NBA.com
- Stats at Basketball Reference

Jerry "Ice" Reynolds (born December 23, 1962) is an American former professional basketball player who was selected by the Milwaukee Bucks in the first round (22nd pick overall) of the 1985 NBA draft. A 6'8" guard-forward from Louisiana State University (LSU), Reynolds played in eight National Basketball Association (NBA) seasons from 1985 to 1992 until 1995–96. He played for the Bucks, Seattle SuperSonics and Orlando Magic. His best year as a pro came during the 1989–90 season as a member of the Magic, appearing in 67 games and averaging 12.8 points, 4.8 rebounds, and 1.39 steals per game.

Reynolds is credited with being the first person noted to have used the term "24/7", when he described his jump shot as being "good 24 hours a day, seven days a week, 365 days a year".

Reynolds was also the beneficiary of Scott Skiles' record-breaking 30th assist on December 30, 1990, against the Denver Nuggets.

== Career statistics ==
Legend
GP	Games played	GS	Games started	MPG	Minutes per game
FG%	Field goal percentage	3P%	3-point field goal percentage	FT%	Free throw percentage
RPG	Rebounds per game	APG	Assists per game	SPG	Steals per game
BPG	Blocks per game	PPG	Points per game	**Bold**	Career high

=== NBA ===
==== Regular season ====
Year	Team	GP	GS	MPG	FG%	3P%	FT%	RPG	APG	SPG	BPG	PPG
1985–86	Milwaukee	55	8	9.2	.444	**.500**	.558	1.5	1.6	0.8	0.3	3.7
1986–87	Milwaukee	58	24	16.6	.393	.333	.641	3.0	1.8	0.9	0.5	7.0
1987–88	Milwaukee	62	21	18.7	**.449**	.429	.773	2.6	1.7	1.2	0.5	8.0
1988–89	Seattle	56	0	13.2	.417	.200	.760	1.8	1.1	0.9	0.5	7.6
1989–90	Orlando	67	**40**	**27.1**	.417	.071	.742	**4.8**	2.7	**1.4**	**1.0**	12.8
1990–91	Orlando	**80**	9	23.0	.434	.294	.802	3.7	2.5	1.2	0.7	**12.9**
1991–92	Orlando	46	16	25.2	.380	.125	**.836**	3.2	**3.3**	**1.4**	0.4	12.1
1995–96	Milwaukee	19	0	10.1	.396	.100	.619	1.7	0.6	0.8	0.3	2.9
Career		443	118	18.9	.418	.226	.749	3.0	2.0	1.1	0.6	9.1

==== Playoffs ====
Year	Team	GP	GS	MPG	FG%	3P%	FT%	RPG	APG	SPG	BPG	PPG
1985–86	Milwaukee	**7**	0	5.7	.412	.000	.545	**1.3**	**0.6**	0.6	0.4	2.9
1986–87	Milwaukee	4	0	1.3	.333	.000	.500	0.3	0.5	**0.8**	0.0	0.8
1987–88	Milwaukee	3	0	4.0	**.667**	.000	.000	0.3	0.3	0.0	0.0	2.7
1988–89	Seattle	4	0	**10.0**	.318	**.250**	**.700**	**1.3**	0.3	0.5	**1.5**	**5.5**
Career		18	0	5.4	.396	.167	.609	0.9	0.4	0.5	0.5	2.9

=== College ===
Year	Team	GP	GS	MPG	FG%	3P%	FT%	RPG	APG	SPG	BPG	PPG
1982–83	LSU	**32**	-	27.8	**.534**	-	**.620**	6.2	1.9	2.0	**0.8**	10.6
1983–84	LSU	29	**28**	**31.0**	.528	-	.538	**8.2**	1.6	**2.8**	0.6	**14.2**
1984–85	LSU	29	-	27.7	.502	-	.598	6.1	**3.6**	1.7	0.4	11.0
Career		90	28	28.8	.521	-	.582	6.8	2.3	2.2	0.6	11.9
