= John Stroeder =

American basketball player

Personal information
- Born: July 24, 1958 (age 68) Bremerton, Washington, U.S.
- Listed height: 6 ft 10 in (2.08 m)
- Listed weight: 260 lb (118 kg)

Career information
- High school: Port Townsend (Port Townsend, Washington)
- College: Montana (1976–1980)
- NBA draft: 1980: 8th round, 168th overall pick
- Drafted by: Portland Trail Blazers
- Playing career: 1980–1991
- Position: Power forward
- Number: 54, 32, 25

Career history
- 1980–1982: Birmingham Bullets
- 1982–1983: Montana Golden Nuggets
- 1983–1986: CEP Lorient
- 1986–1987: Rapid City Thrillers
- 1987–1988: Milwaukee Bucks
- 1988: San Antonio Spurs
- 1988–1989: Albany Patroons
- 1989: Golden State Warriors
- 1989–1990: Albany Patroons
- 1990: Sevilla
- 1990–1991: Alviks BK

Career highlights
- CBA champion (1987); All-CBA Second Team (1989)
- Stats at NBA.com
- Stats at Basketball Reference

John Stroeder (born July 24, 1958) is an American former professional basketball player. Born in Bremerton, Washington, he played college basketball for the Montana Grizzlies.

Despite being taken in the 1980 NBA draft (by the Portland Trail Blazers), the 6'10" power forward began his short NBA career with the Milwaukee Bucks in the 1987-88 season, appearing in 41 games and averaging 1.9 points and 1.7 rebounds per contest. After the season, he was selected in the 1988 expansion draft by one of the league's two newest franchises, the Miami Heat, but did not play a game for them. He split his final season in 1988-89 with the Golden State Warriors and San Antonio Spurs, playing five total games.

He also played with the Continental Basketball Association's Albany Patroons. He won a CBA championship with the Tampa Bay / Rapid City Thrillers in 1987. He was selected to the All-CBA Second Team in 1989.

In 2008 and 2009, Stroeder was the head boys basketball coach at his alma mater, Port Townsend High School in Port Townsend, Washington. He led the team to a 23–3 record and a sixth-place finish at the 2008 Class 2A State Basketball Tournament and a 23–4 record and a third-place finish at the 2009 Class 1A State Basketball Tournament.

== Career statistics ==
Legend
GP	Games played	GS	Games started	MPG	Minutes per game
FG%	Field goal percentage	3P%	3-point field goal percentage	FT%	Free throw percentage
RPG	Rebounds per game	APG	Assists per game	SPG	Steals per game
BPG	Blocks per game	PPG	Points per game	**Bold**	Career high

=== NBA ===
==== Regular season ====
Year	Team	GP	GS	MPG	FG%	3P%	FT%	RPG	APG	SPG	BPG	PPG
1987–88	Milwaukee	**41**	0	**6.6**	.367	.000	**.667**	1.7	.5	**.1**	.3	**1.9**
1988–89	San Antonio	1	0	2.0	–	–	–	.0	.0	.0	.0	.0
1988–89	Golden State	4	0	5.0	**.400**	–	–	**3.5**	**.8**	.0	**.5**	1.0
Career		46	0	6.4	.369	.000	.667	1.8	.5	.1	.3	1.8

==== Playoffs ====
Year	Team	GP	GS	MPG	FG%	3P%	FT%	RPG	APG	SPG	BPG	PPG
1988	Milwaukee	1	0	1.0	1.000	1.000	–	.0	.0	.0	.0	3.0
