= Dirk Minniefield =

American basketball player (born 1961)

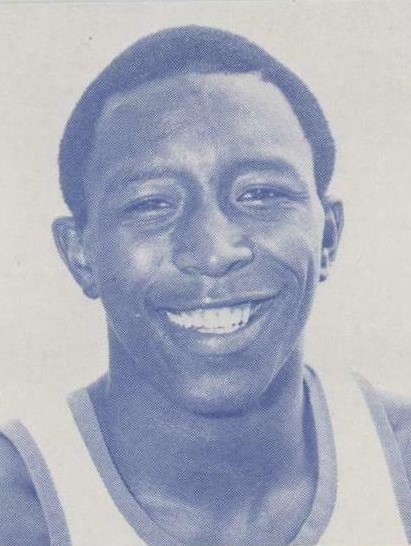

Personal information
- Born: January 17, 1961 (age 65) Lexington, Kentucky, U.S.
- Listed height: 6 ft 3 in (1.91 m)
- Listed weight: 180 lb (82 kg)

Career information
- High school: Lafayette (Lexington, Kentucky)
- College: Kentucky (1979–1983)
- NBA draft: 1983: 2nd round, 33rd overall pick
- Drafted by: Dallas Mavericks
- Playing career: 1983–1993
- Position: Point guard
- Number: 14, 10, 11

Career history
- 1983–1985: Louisville Catbirds
- 1985–1986: Cleveland Cavaliers
- 1986–1987: Houston Rockets
- 1987: Staten Island Stallions
- 1987: Golden State Warriors
- 1987–1988: Boston Celtics
- 1992–1993: Rochester Renegade

Career highlights
- Second-team All-SEC (1982); Kentucky Mr. Basketball (1979); McDonald's All-American (1979); Second-team Parade All-American (1979); Fourth-team Parade All-American (1978)
- Stats at NBA.com
- Stats at Basketball Reference

Dirk DeWayne Minniefield (born January 17, 1961) is an American former professional basketball player. While at Lafayette High School in Lexington, he was named the 1979 Kentucky Mr. Basketball, an honor given to the top high school player in the state of Kentucky. In addition to "Mr. Basketball", he was also named a McDonald's and Parade High School All-American. Minniefield played his college ball at the University of Kentucky (UK), where he became a member of the 1,000 point club. In 1983, he was drafted in the second round (33rd overall) by the National Basketball Association's Dallas Mavericks. The 6 ft 3 in (1.91 m), 180 lb (82 kg) guard played three seasons in NBA, making stops with the Cleveland Cavaliers, Houston Rockets, Golden State Warriors, and Boston Celtics.

== Early life ==
Minniefield began regularly using marijuana at age 14. Minniefield, who has been sober since the early 1990s, told a group of top high school prospects in 2007 that "My younger kids have never seen me take a drink. They don't know the daddy the older kids know. They know a totally different guy." (Minniefield was a father of three children by the time he graduated from high school, and has two children from his current marriage).

== Drug issues ==
His drug problem continued into college. He admitted to having carried a vial of cocaine with him regularly during his senior year at UK, and frequently took hits of the drug before games. Most notably, he admitted in 2007 that he and several teammates had gone to a park in Knoxville, Tennessee the night before Kentucky's showdown with Louisville in the 1983 NCAA Mideast Regional final and smoked marijuana. He also said that he smoked more marijuana after returning to his hotel room.

As fate would have it, he had the ball late in the game, with UK clinging to a narrow lead. He went into the lane and threw up a tentative shot that UofL center Charles Jones blocked. The Cardinals went on to force overtime and then dominated the extra period, winning 80–68. He would later say about the incident,

"It was sad. Because that was the moment. You only have certain moments in your life. You have to seize your moment. I missed my moment. I don't know if the marijuana had an impact. I'm not a doctor. Being a player, I'm going to say that (it did)... Any other time, I would dunk that ball. I know I was depressed about it for probably the first two years after college. It played a part in my drug use, the depression. Being from Lexington, I had to listen (to complaining fans) more than anybody else would."

Minniefield's drug use eventually contributed to the early end of his NBA career. He returned to Lexington, but wound up serving a year in jail after writing bad checks and violating probation on those charges. His first wife divorced him and he left Lexington "penniless". He found his way to the John Lucas Drug Abuse Center in Houston; Minniefield would say of Lucas, "I finally found that person who talked my language. He could see past the outside facade I learned to put up." For his part, Lucas said, "I call him one of my children. He's delightful. He's helped me as much as I helped him."

After treatment, Minniefield worked as transportation manager—according to him, "A better word is van driver"—for the San Antonio Spurs while Lucas was coach. He would go on to be a head coach/general manager in the United States Basketball League (USBL) for the Miami Tropics (a team that Lucas owned) and serve as the Spurs' strength and conditioning coach. When Lucas left for the Philadelphia 76ers, Minniefield took a job as a drug counselor with the NBA to enable him to stay in Houston.

== Career statistics ==
Legend
GP	Games played	GS	Games started	MPG	Minutes per game
FG%	Field goal percentage	3P%	3-point field goal percentage	FT%	Free throw percentage
RPG	Rebounds per game	APG	Assists per game	SPG	Steals per game
BPG	Blocks per game	PPG	Points per game	**Bold**	Career high

=== NBA ===
==== Regular season ====
Year	Team	GP	GS	MPG	FG%	3P%	FT%	RPG	APG	SPG	BPG	PPG
1985–86	Cleveland	**76**	2	14.9	.481	.270	.785	1.7	3.5	.9	.0	5.5
1986–87	Cleveland	11	0	11.1	.310	.000	.250	.9	1.2	.5	**.1**	2.5
1986–87	Houston	63	**52**	**23.5**	.466	**.324**	.709	**2.1**	**5.3**	1.0	**.1**	**7.7**
1987–88	Golden State	11	0	18.4	**.521**	.200	.609	1.9	3.5	**1.4**	.0	5.9
1987–88	Boston	61	5	14.2	.480	.273	**.844**	1.2	3.1	.7	.0	3.2
Career		222	60	17.1	.470	.272	.739	1.7	3.8	.9	.0	5.3

==== Playoffs ====
Year	Team	GP	GS	MPG	FG%	3P%	FT%	RPG	APG	SPG	BPG	PPG
1987	Houston	8	0	3.4	**.500**	.000	**1.000**	**.3**	.3	.1	.0	**1.8**
1988	Boston	**11**	0	**4.5**	.429	**.500**	**1.000**	.2	**1.0**	**.2**	.0	1.5
Career		19	0	4.1	.455	.400	1.000	.2	.7	.2	.0	1.6
