= Randy Breuer =

American basketball player (born 1960)

Personal information
- Born: October 11, 1960 (age 66) Lake City, Minnesota, U.S.
- Listed height: 7 ft 3 in (2.21 m)
- Listed weight: 230 lb (104 kg)

Career information
- High school: Lincoln (Lake City, Minnesota)
- College: Minnesota (1979–1983)
- NBA draft: 1983: 1st round, 18th overall pick
- Drafted by: Milwaukee Bucks
- Playing career: 1983–1994
- Position: Center
- Number: 45

Career history
- 1983–1990: Milwaukee Bucks
- 1990–1992: Minnesota Timberwolves
- 1992–1993: Atlanta Hawks
- 1993–1994: Sacramento Kings

Career highlights
- 2× First-team All-Big Ten (1982, 1983); No. 45 retired by Minnesota Golden Gophers; Fourth-team Parade All-American (1979); Co-Minnesota Mr. Basketball (1979)

Career statistics
- Points: 4,599 (6.8 ppg)
- Rebounds: 2,986 (4.4 rpg)
- Blocks: 750 (1.1 bpg)
- Stats at NBA.com
- Stats at Basketball Reference

Randall W. Breuer (born October 11, 1960) is an American former professional basketball player who was selected by the Milwaukee Bucks in the first round (18th pick overall) of the 1983 NBA draft. A 7'3" center from the University of Minnesota, Breuer played in 11 NBA seasons from 1983 to 1994. He played for the Bucks, Minnesota Timberwolves, Atlanta Hawks and Sacramento Kings.

Breuer's best year as a pro came during the 1987–88 season as a member of the Bucks, appearing in 81 games and averaging 12.0 points and 6.8 rebounds per game. In his career, he played in 681 games and scored a total of 4,599 points. On December 2 of that season, Breuer had arguably his best game as a Buck when he scored 33 points, grabbed 11 rebounds, and blocked 4 shots in a 115–105 loss against the Detroit Pistons.

As a member of the Lake City high school team, he led them to consecutive state titles in 1978 and 1979. He was named Minnesota Mr. Basketball in 1979, along with Greg Downing.

== NBA career statistics ==
Legend
GP	Games played	GS	Games started	MPG	Minutes per game
FG%	Field goal percentage	3P%	3-point field goal percentage	FT%	Free throw percentage
RPG	Rebounds per game	APG	Assists per game	SPG	Steals per game
BPG	Blocks per game	PPG	Points per game	**Bold**	Career high

=== Regular season ===
Year	Team	GP	GS	MPG	FG%	3P%	FT%	RPG	APG	SPG	BPG	PPG
1983–84	Milwaukee	57	8	8.3	.384	.000	.696	1.9	0.3	0.2	0.7	2.9
1984–85	Milwaukee	78	0	13.9	**.511**	.000	.701	3.3	0.5	0.3	1.1	5.3
1985–86	Milwaukee	**82**	63	21.9	.477	.000	**.712**	5.6	**1.4**	0.6	1.4	8.4
1986–87	Milwaukee	76	10	19.3	.485	.000	.584	4.6	0.6	**0.7**	0.8	7.9
1987–88	Milwaukee	81	**73**	**27.9**	.495	.000	.657	**6.8**	1.3	0.6	1.3	**12.0**
1988–89	Milwaukee	48	4	10.7	.480	.000	.549	2.8	0.5	0.2	0.8	4.2
1989–90	Milwaukee	30	8	18.5	.462	.000	.627	4.2	0.4	0.3	1.1	6.8
1989–90	Minnesota	51	47	26.0	.416	.000	.662	5.7	1.6	0.6	1.5	10.2
1990–91	Minnesota	73	44	20.6	.453	.000	.443	4.7	1.0	0.5	1.1	5.9
1991–92	Minnesota	67	25	17.6	.468	.000	.532	4.2	1.3	0.4	**1.5**	5.4
1992–93	Atlanta	12	0	8.9	.484	.000	.400	2.3	0.5	0.2	0.3	2.7
1993–94	Sacramento	26	3	9.5	.308	.000	.214	2.2	0.3	0.2	0.7	0.7
Career		681	285	18.4	.467	.000	.628	4.4	0.9	0.4	1.1	6.8

=== Playoffs ===
Year	Team	GP	GS	MPG	FG%	3P%	FT%	RPG	APG	SPG	BPG	PPG
1983–84	Milwaukee	12	-	5.5	.423	.000	.600	1.4	0.3	0.0	0.5	2.1
1984–85	Milwaukee	8	0	13.0	**.577**	.000	.667	3.0	0.0	0.3	0.3	5.5
1985–86	Milwaukee	**14**	**14**	**22.7**	.535	.000	**.684**	4.3	0.8	**0.8**	**1.3**	**8.4**
1986–87	Milwaukee	12	2	13.0	.485	.000	.667	2.6	0.3	0.6	0.8	3.3
1987–88	Milwaukee	4	0	11.8	.563	.000	.167	3.0	0.3	0.3	0.5	4.8
1988–89	Milwaukee	9	1	18.0	.531	.000	.385	**4.4**	0.6	0.2	0.7	4.3
1992–93	Atlanta	1	0	17.0	.250	.000	.000	2.0	**1.0**	0.0	1.0	2.0
Career		60	17	14.5	.516	.000	.600	3.1	0.4	0.4	0.7	4.8

== See also ==
- List of tallest players in National Basketball Association history
