= 1987–88 Milwaukee Bucks season =

NBA professional basketball team season

- Head coach: Del Harris
- General manager: Del Harris
- Owner: Herb Kohl
- Arena: MECCA Arena

Results
- Record: 42–40 (.512)
- Place: Division: 4th (Central); Conference: 5th (Eastern)
- Playoff finish: First round (lost to Hawks 2–3)
- Stats at Basketball Reference

The 1987–88 Milwaukee Bucks season was the 20th season for the Milwaukee Bucks in the National Basketball Association.

== Season summary ==
=== Off-season ===
After the resignation of Don Nelson, the Bucks hired Del Harris as their new head coach. In November, the team acquired second-year forward Larry Krystkowiak from the San Antonio Spurs; Krystkowiak previously played overseas in Italy, and was placed on the Spurs' suspended list for violating his contract.

=== Regular season ===
Under Harris, the Bucks got off to a 9–4 start to the regular season, and played around .500 in winning percentage as the season progressed, holding a 22–20 record at the All-Star break. At mid-season, the team traded three-point specialist Craig Hodges to the Phoenix Suns in exchange for Jay Humphries. Before the trade, Hodges averaged 9.2 points and 2.5 assists per game, and shot .466 in three-point field-goal percentage in 43 games. Despite losing nine of their final twelve games of the season, the Bucks finished in fourth place in the Central Division with a 42–40 record, and earned the fifth seed in the Eastern Conference; the team qualified for the NBA playoffs for the ninth consecutive year.

Terry Cummings averaged 21.3 points and 7.3 rebounds per game, while Jack Sikma averaged 16.5 points and 8.6 rebounds per game, and sixth man Ricky Pierce provided the team with 16.4 points per game off the bench; Pierce only played just 37 games due to a contract holdout, in which he missed the first 45 games of the regular season. In addition, Paul Pressey contributed 13.1 points, 5.0 rebounds, 7.0 assists and 1.5 steals per game, while Randy Breuer averaged 12.0 points, 6.8 rebounds and 1.3 blocks per game, and Sidney Moncrief provided with 10.8 points per game, but only played 56 games due to a knee injury. Meanwhile, John Lucas contributed 9.2 points and 4.8 assists per game, Jerry Reynolds contributed 8.0 points per game, Krystkowiak averaged 7.2 points and 4.6 rebounds per game, and Paul Mokeski provided with 4.2 points and 3.7 rebounds per game.

During the NBA All-Star weekend at the Chicago Stadium in Chicago, Illinois, and before the mid-season trade, Hodges participated in the NBA Three-Point Shootout for the third consecutive year. Pressey finished tied in eighth place in Defensive Player of the Year voting, while Breuer finished tied in sixth place in Most Improved Player voting. The Bucks finished 18th in the NBA in home-game attendance, with an attendance of 441,615 at the MECCA Arena during the regular season.

=== NBA playoffs ===
In the Eastern Conference First Round of the 1988 NBA playoffs, the Bucks faced off against the 4th–seeded Atlanta Hawks, who were led by All-Star forward Dominique Wilkins, All-Star guard Doc Rivers, and Kevin Willis. The Bucks lost the first two games to the Hawks on the road at the Omni Coliseum, but managed to win the next two games at home, which included a Game 4 win over the Hawks at the MECCA Arena, 105–99 to even the series. However, the Bucks lost Game 5 to the Hawks at the Omni Coliseum, 121–111, thus losing in a hard-fought five-game series.

=== Aftermath ===
This was also the Bucks' final season in which they played their home games at the MECCA Arena. Following the season, Lucas signed as a free agent with the Seattle SuperSonics.

== Draft picks ==
Round	Pick	Player	Position	Nationality	College
2	32	Bob McCann	PF	United States	Morehead State
2	40	Winston Garland	PG	United States	Missouri State
3	64	J. J. Weber		United States	Wisconsin
4	87	Darryl Bedford		United States	Austin Peay State
5	110	Brian Vaughns		United States	UC Santa Barbara
6	133	Gay Elmore	SF	United States	Virginia Military Institute

== Roster ==
1987–88 Milwaukee Bucks roster
Players

Pos.	No.	Player	Height	Weight	DOB	From
C	45	Randy Breuer	7 ft 3 in (2.21 m)	230 lb (104 kg)	1960–10–11	Minnesota
F	34	Terry Cummings	6 ft 9 in (2.06 m)	220 lb (100 kg)	1961–03–15	DePaul
G	24	Jay Humphries	6 ft 3 in (1.91 m)	185 lb (84 kg)	1962–10–17	Colorado
F	42	Larry Krystkowiak	6 ft 9 in (2.06 m)	220 lb (100 kg)	1964–09–23	Montana
G	10	John Lucas	6 ft 3 in (1.91 m)	175 lb (79 kg)	1953–10–31	Maryland
C	44	Paul Mokeski	7 ft 0 in (2.13 m)	250 lb (113 kg)	1957–01–03	Kansas
G	4	Sidney Moncrief	6 ft 3 in (1.91 m)	180 lb (82 kg)	1957–09–21	Arkansas
G	22	Ricky Pierce	6 ft 4 in (1.93 m)	205 lb (93 kg)	1959–08–19	Rice
F	25	Paul Pressey	6 ft 5 in (1.96 m)	185 lb (84 kg)	1958–12–24	Tulsa
G/F	35	Jerry Reynolds	6 ft 8 in (2.03 m)	200 lb (91 kg)	1962–12–23	LSU
C	43	Jack Sikma	6 ft 11 in (2.11 m)	230 lb (104 kg)	1955–11–14	Illinois Wesleyan
F	54	John Stroeder	6 ft 10 in (2.08 m)	260 lb (118 kg)	1958–07–24	Montana

Coaches
Head coach
- Del Harris
Assistant(s)
- Mack Calvin
- Mike Dunleavy, Sr.
- Frank Hamblen

Legend
- (DP) Unsigned draft pick
- (FA) Free agent
- (S) Suspended
- Injured

== Regular season ==
=== Season standings ===
Central Division	W	L	PCT	GB	Home	Road	Div
y-Detroit Pistons	54	28	.659	–	34–7	20–21	20–10
x-Chicago Bulls	50	32	.610	4	30–11	20–21	16–13
x-Atlanta Hawks	50	32	.610	4	30-11	20-21	16–13
x-Milwaukee Bucks	42	40	.512	12	30–11	12–29	13–17
x-Cleveland Cavaliers	42	40	.512	12	31–10	11–30	11–19
Indiana Pacers	38	44	.463	16	25–16	13–28	13–17

#	Eastern Conference				
#	Team	W	L	PCT	GB
1	c-Boston Celtics	57	25	.695	–
2	y-Detroit Pistons	54	28	.659	3
3	x-Chicago Bulls	50	32	.610	7
4	x-Atlanta Hawks	50	32	.610	7
5	x-Milwaukee Bucks	42	40	.512	15
6	x-Cleveland Cavaliers	42	40	.512	15
7	x-Washington Bullets	38	44	.463	19
8	x-New York Knicks	38	44	.463	19
9	Indiana Pacers	38	44	.463	19
10	Philadelphia 76ers	36	46	.439	21
11	New Jersey Nets	19	63	.232	38

z - clinched division title
y - clinched division title
x - clinched playoff spot

=== Record vs. opponents ===
==== vs. Eastern Conference ====
vs. Atlantic Division

1987–88 NBA records
Team	BOS	NJN	NYK	PHI	WSB	Total
Atlanta	2–4	5–0	3–3	6–0	3–3	19–10
Chicago	3–3	5–1	3–2	4–2	3–3	18–11
Cleveland	3–2	5–1	2–4	3–2	6–0	19–9
Detroit	3–3	5–1	4–2	4–1	3–2	19–9
Indiana	0–5	6–0	2–3	2–4	2–4	12–16
Milwaukee	3–3	3–2	3–3	2–4	4–1	15–13

vs. Central Division

1987–88 NBA records
Team	ATL	CHI	CLE	DET	IND	MIL	Total
Atlanta	—	2–3	5–1	2–4	3–3	4–2	16–13
Chicago	3–2	—	3–3	2–4	3–3	5–1	16–13
Cleveland	1–5	3–3	—	1–5	4–2	2–4	11–19
Detroit	4–2	4–2	5–1	—	3–3	4–2	20–10
Indiana	2–4	3–3	2–4	3–3	—	3–3	13–17
Milwaukee	3–3	1–5	4–2	2–4	3–3	—	13–17

==== vs. Western Conference ====
vs. Midwest Division

1987–88 NBA records
Team	DAL	DEN	HOU	SAC	SAS	UTA	Total
Atlanta	2–0	1–1	1–1	1–1	2–0	1–1	8–4
Chicago	0–2	1–1	2–0	1–1	1–1	2–0	7–5
Cleveland	1–1	1–1	1–1	2–0	2–0	0–2	7–5
Detroit	1–1	1–1	1–1	2–0	1–1	2–0	8–4
Indiana	0–2	1–1	0–2	2–0	2–0	1–1	6–6
Milwaukee	0–2	1–1	0–2	2–0	1–1	1–1	5–7

vs. Pacific Division

1987–88 NBA records
Team	GSW	LAC	LAL	PHO	POR	SEA	Total
Atlanta	2–0	2–0	0–2	1–1	0–2	2–0	7–5
Chicago	2–0	2–0	1–1	2–0	1–1	1–1	9–3
Cleveland	0–2	1–1	1–1	1–1	1–1	1–1	5–7
Detroit	2–0	1–1	0–2	2–0	1–1	1–1	7–5
Indiana	2–0	1–1	1–1	2–0	0–2	1–1	7–5
Milwaukee	2–0	2–0	2–0	1–1	1–1	1–1	9–3

=== Game log ===
1987–88 game log
Total: 42–40 (home: 30–11; road: 12–29)
November: 9–4 (home: 6–1; road: 3–3)

Game	Date	Team	Score	High points	High rebounds	High assists	Location Attendance	Record
1	November 6, 1987; 7:00 p.m. CST	@ Boston	L 108–125	Cummings (26)	Sikma (11)	Mannion, Pressey; Reynolds (4)	Boston Garden; 14,890	0–1
2	November 7, 1987; 8:00 p.m. CST	Detroit	W 119–105	Sikma (26)	Sikma (18)	Lucas, Pressey (8)	MECCA Arena; 11,052	1–1
3	November 10, 1987; 7:30 p.m. CST	Washington	W 115–100	Pressey (24)	Breuer (16)	Sikma (7)	MECCA Arena; 10,586	2–1
4	November 11, 1987; 6:30 p.m. CST	@ Cleveland	W 107–101	Sikma (26)	Sikma (14)	Sikma (6)	Richfield Coliseum; 12,145	3–1
5	November 14, 1987	@ New York	L 89–93				Madison Square Garden	3–2
6	November 15, 1987; 7:30 p.m. CST	Atlanta	W 112–103	Cummings (28)	Sikma (12)	Lucas (12)	MECCA Arena; 11,052	4–2
7	November 17, 1987	Golden State	W 120–108				MECCA Arena	5–2
8	November 19, 1987	@ Sacramento	W 117–113				ARCO Arena I	6–2
9	November 20, 1987	@ Seattle	L 97–99				Seattle Center Coliseum	6–3
10	November 22, 1987; 9:30 p.m. CST	@ L.A. Lakers	W 124–116 (OT)	Reynolds (24)	Sikma (17)	Cummings, Pressey; Sikma (6)	The Forum; 17,505	7–3
11	November 25, 1987; 7:30 p.m. CST	Chicago	L 101–103	Pressey (18)	Pressey (13)	Pressey (10)	MECCA Arena; 11,052	7–4
12	November 28, 1987; 8:00 p.m. CST	Boston	W 112–97	Pressey (21)	Sikma (11)	Pressey (12)	MECCA Arena; 11,052	8–4
13	November 30, 1987	Indiana	W 104–94				MECCA Arena	9–4

December: 6–6 (home: 4–3; road: 2–3)

Game	Date	Team	Score	High points	High rebounds	High assists	Location Attendance	Record
14	December 2, 1987; 6:30 p.m. CST	@ Detroit	L 105–115	Breuer (33)	Breuer (11)	Sikma (8)	Pontiac Silverdome; 18,780	9–4
15	December 4, 1987; 7:00 p.m. CST	L. A. Lakers	W 85–83	Hodges (22)	Breuer (9)	Mannion (6)	MECCA Arena; 11,052	10–5
16	December 8, 1987	@ Indiana	L 101–103				Market Square Arena	10–6
17	December 10, 1987; 7:30 p.m. CST	@ Chicago	L 105–111	Cummings (27)	Sikma (11)	Cummings, Lucas (5)	Chicago Stadium; 17,820	10–7
18	December 11, 1987	Portland	W 125–112				MECCA Arena	11–7
19	December 13, 1987; 7:30 p.m. CST	Dallas	L 99–113	Cummings, Sikma (19)	Cummings, Pressey (9)	Pressey (7)	MECCA Arena; 11,052	11–8
20	December 15, 1987	@ New York	W 103–98				Madison Square Garden	12–8
21	December 18, 1987; 8:00 p.m. CST	Atlanta	L 87–94	Breuer, Hodges (19)	Breuer (9)	Pressey (10)	MECCA Arena; 11,052	12–9
22	December 22, 1987	New York	W 122–105				MECCA Arena	13–9
23	December 26, 1987; 8:00 p.m. CST	Washington	W 102–97	Sikma (25)	Cumings (11)	Pressey (8)	MECCA Arena; 11,052	14–9
24	December 29, 1987	@ New Jersey	W 106–88				Brendan Byrne Arena	15–9
25	December 30, 1987	Houston	L 93–102				MECCA Arena	15–10

January: 6–9 (home: 4–2; road: 2–7)

Game	Date	Team	Score	High points	High rebounds	High assists	Location Attendance	Record
26	January 2, 1988	Indiana	L 97–99				MECCA Arena	15–11
27	January 5, 1988	L. A. Clippers	W 98–82				MECCA Arena	16–11
28	January 7, 1988	@ Indiana	L 108–114				Market Square Arena	16–12
29	January 8, 1988; 8:00 p.m. CST	Utah	L 107–111	Sikma (24)	Cummings (9)	Lucas (13)	MECCA Arena; 11,052	16–13
30	January 10, 1988	New Jersey	W 105–87				MECCA Arena	17–13
31	January 12, 1988	Philadelphia	W 106–103				MECCA Arena	18–13
32	January 14, 1988; 6:30 p.m. CST	@ Washington	L 107–136	Sikma (23)	Sikma (12)	Pressey (7)	Capital Centre; 8,316	18–14
33	January 17, 1988; 1:30 p.m. CST	Cleveland	W 111–93	Cummings (25)	Breuer (17)	Pressey (9)	MECCA Arena; 11,052	19–14
34	January 19, 1988	@ San Antonio	L 107–136				HemisFair Arena	19–15
35	January 21, 1988	@ Houston	L 103–116				The Summit	19–16
36	January 23, 1988; 7:30 p.m. CST	@ Dallas	L 97–113	Pressey (22)	Cummings, Sikma (12)	Lucas, Moncrief (4)	Reunion Arena; 17,007	19–17
37	January 25, 1988	@ Golden State	W 108–105				Oakland-Alameda County Coliseum Arena	20–17
38	January 26, 1988	@ Portland	L 106–112				Memorial Coliseum	20–18
39	January 28, 1988; 8:30 p.m. CST	@ Denver	L 113–122	Pressey (22)	Pressey (9)	Pressey (9)	McNichols Sports Arena; 13,911	20–19
40	January 29, 1988	@ L. A. Clippers	W 97–88				Los Angeles Memorial Sports Arena	21–19

February: 8–5 (home: 5–2; road: 3–3)

Game	Date	Team	Score	High points	High rebounds	High assists	Location Attendance	Record
41	February 2, 1988; 7:30 p.m. CST	Detroit	L 97–99	Cummings (30)	Cummings (9)	Pressey (5)	MECCA Arena; 11,052	21–20
42	February 4, 1988; 7:30 p.m. CST	Boston	W 111–101	Cummings (30)	Sikma (11)	Moncrief, Pressey (8)	MECCA Arena; 11,052	22–20
All-Star Break
43	February 9, 1988; 7:30 p.m. CST	Cleveland	W 112–104	Cummings (29)	Sikma (12)	Moncrief (10)	MECCA Arena; 11,052	23–20
44	February 11, 1988	@ Philadelphia	L 113–119 OT				The Spectrum	23–21
45	February 12, 1988; 8:00 p.m. CST	Chicago	L 93–95	Cummings (23)	Breuer, Sikma (9)	Lucas, Moncrief, Pressey (6)	MECCA Arena; 11,052	23–22
46	February 15, 1988; 12 Noon CST	@ Washington	W 114–110	Sikma (27)	Sikma (12)	Lucas (9)	Capital Centre; 9,564	24–22
48	February 19, 1988; 8:00 p.m. CST	Detroit	W 119–108	Cummings (36)	Cummings (11)	Pressey (7)	MECCA Arena; 11,052	26–22
52	February 26, 1988; 6:30 p.m. CST	@ Boston	L 96–132	Lucas (19)	Krystkowiak, Stroeder (7)	Lucas (6)	Boston Garden; 14,890	28–24
53	February 27, 1988; 7:30 p.m. CST	@ Chicago	W 94–91	Cummings (27)	Sikma (7)	Licas (13)	Chicago Stadium; 18,243	29–24

March: 9–7 (home: 7–1; road: 2–6)

Game	Date	Team	Score	High points	High rebounds	High assists	Location Attendance	Record
54	March 1, 1988; 7:00 p.m. CST	Boston	W 117–116	Moncrief, Sikma (20)	Sikma (15)	Moncrief, Pressey (7)	MECCA Arena; 11,052	30–24
55	March 5, 1988; 6:30 p.m. CST	@ Atlanta	W 104–101	Moncrief (29)	Cummings (15)	Pressey (6)	The Omni; 16,451	31–24
56	March 6, 1988; 6:00 p.m. CST	@ Detroit	L 99–109	Pierce (21)	Cummings (8)	Lucas (7)	Pontiac Silverdome; 24,751	31–25
58	March 9, 1988; 6:30 p.m. CST	@ Cleveland	L 91–117	Cummings (22)	Cummings, Mokeski (6)	Lucas, Pressey, Reynolds (4)	Richfield Coliseum; 11,641	32–26
59	March 11, 1988; 8:00 p.m. CST	Denver	W 132–93	Reynolds (24)	Breuer, Pressey (10)	Lucas (8)	MECCA Arena; 11,052	33–26
63	March 19, 1988; 8:00 p.m. CST	Cleveland	W 101–100	Pierce (29)	Cummings (9)	Lucas (7)	MECCA Arena; 11,052	36–27
64	March 21, 1988; 6:30 p.m. CST	@ Atlanta	L 105–115	Cummings (26)	Sikma (11)	Pressey (8)	The Omni; 13,702	36–28
65	March 22, 1988; 7:30 p.m. CST	Atlanta	W 111–98	Breuer (27)	Breuer (17)	Pressey (12)	MECCA Arena; 11,052	37–28
67	March 26, 1988; 8:30 p.m. CST	@ Utah	W 107–105	Cummings (24)	Sikma (11)	Humphries, Sikma (7)	Salt Palace; 12,444	38–29

April: 4–9 (home: 4–2; road: 0–7)

Game	Date	Team	Score	High points	High rebounds	High assists	Location Attendance	Record
71	April 5, 1988; 6:30 p.m. CDT	@ Atlanta	L 110–121	Pierce (21)	Sikma (8)	Lucas (7)	The Omni; 15,442	39–32
72	April 6, 1988; 7:30 p.m. CDT	Chicago	L 110–119	Pierce (19)	Cummings (9)	Lucas, Moncrief (8)	MECCA Arena; 11,052	39–33
73	April 8, 1988; 6:30 p.m. CDT	@ Cleveland	L 85–104	Reynolds (16)	Breuer (8)	Lucas (10)	Richfield Coliseum; 16,475	39–34
76	April 13, 1988; 6:30 p.m. CDT	@ Boston	L 104–123	Cummings (21)	Krystkowiak (8)	Cummings, Moncrief (5)	Boston Garden; 14,890	40–36
77	April 15, 1988; 7:00 p.m. CST	@ Detroit	L 91–92	Sikma (28)	Krystkowiak (8)	Lucas (5)	Pontiac Silverdome; 27,126	40–37
78	April 17, 1988; 12:30 p.m. CDT	@ Chicago	L 97–105	Cummings (27)	Cummings (11)	Lucas, Sikma (7)	Chicago Stadium; 18,551	40–38
80	April 20, 1988; 7:30 p.m. CDT	Washington	W 132–94	Cummings (26)	Cummings (10)	Pressey (12)	MECCA Arena; 11,052	41–39
81	April 22, 1988	New York	W 118–109				MECCA Arena	42–39

1987–88 schedule

== Playoffs ==
1988 playoff game log
Eastern Conference First Round: 2–3 (home: 2–0; road: 0–3)

Game	Date	Team	Score	High points	High rebounds	High assists	Location Attendance	Series
1	April 29, 1988; 6:30 p.m. CDT	@ Atlanta	L 107–110	Pressey (21)	Sikma (12)	Pressey (7)	The Omni; 11,517	0–1
2	May 1, 1988; 6:00 p.m. CDT	@ Atlanta	L 97–104	Moncrief (22)	Sikma (17)	Pressey (9)	The Omni; 11,777	0–2
3	May 4, 1988; 7:30 p.m. CDT	Atlanta	W 123–115	Cummings (30)	Sikma (16)	Pressey (6)	MECCA Arena; 11,052	1–2
4	May 6, 1988; 7:30 p.m. CDT	Atlanta	W 105–99	Cummings (30)	Sikma (9)	Moncrief (7)	MECCA Arena; 11,052	2–2
5	May 8, 1988; 6:00 p.m. CDT	@ Atlanta	L 111–121	Terry Cummings (28)	Larry Krystkowiak (10)	Moncrief, Pressey (6)	The Omni; 12,190	2–3

1988 schedule

== Player statistics ==
Legend
GP	Games played	GS	Games started	MPG	Minutes per game
FG%	Field-goal percentage	3P%	3-point field-goal percentage	FT%	Free-throw percentage
RPG	Rebounds per game	APG	Assists per game	SPG	Steals per game
BPG	Blocks per game	PPG	Points per game

=== Season ===
Player	GP	GS	MPG	FG%	3FG%	FT%	RPG	APG	SPG	BPG	PPG
Terry Cummings	76	76	34.6	48.5	33.3	66.5	7.3	2.4	1.0	0.6	21.3
Jack Sikma	82	82	35.6	48.6	21.4	92.2	8.6	3.4	1.1	1.0	16.5
Ricky Pierce	37	0	26.1	51.0	21.4	87.7	2.2	2.0	0.6	0.2	16.4
Paul Pressey	75	75	33.1	49.1	20.5	79.8	5.0	7.0	1.5	0.5	13.1
Randy Breuer	81	73	27.9	49.5	0.0	65.7	6.8	1.3	0.6	1.3	12.0
Sidney Moncrief	56	51	25.5	48.9	16.1	83.7	3.2	3.6	0.7	0.3	10.8
Craig Hodges	43	0	22.9	44.9	46.6	82.1	1.1	2.5	0.7	0.0	9.2
John Lucas	81	22	21.8	44.5	33.8	80.2	2.0	4.8	1.1	0.0	9.2
Jerry Reynolds	62	21	18.7	44.9	42.9	77.3	2.6	1.7	1.2	0.5	8.0
Larry Krystkowiak	50	7	21.0	48.1	0.0	81.1	4.6	1.0	0.4	0.2	7.2
Paul Mokeski	60	0	14.1	47.6	0.0	70.8	3.7	0.4	0.5	0.5	4.2
Dave Hoppen	3	0	11.7	36.4	0.0	100.0	2.3	0.7	0.0	0.0	3.7
Pace Mannion	35	1	13.6	40.7	16.7	67.6	1.5	1.6	0.4	0.2	3.5
Jay Humphries	18	0	14.0	37.0	0.0	64.3	1.3	2.3	1.1	0.1	2.7
Charles Davis	5	0	7.8	33.3	0.0	0.0	0.6	0.6	0.4	0.2	2.4
Conner Henry	14	2	10.4	31.7	33.3	57.1	1.4	2.1	0.3	0.1	2.3
John Stroeder	41	0	6.6	36.7	0.0	66.7	1.7	0.5	0.1	0.3	1.9
Andre Moore	3	0	5.3	66.7	0.0	0.0	0.7	0.3	0.0	0.0	1.3
Rickie Winslow	7	0	6.4	23.1	0.0	50.0	1.0	0.3	0.1	0.0	1.0
Dudley Bradley	2	0	2.5	0.0	0.0	0.0	0.5	0.5	0.0	0.0	0.0

=== Playoffs ===
Player	GP	GS	MPG	FG%	3FG%	FT%	RPG	APG	SPG	BPG	PPG
Terry Cummings	5	5	38.6	56.2	0.0	65.9	7.8	2.6	1.8	0.6	25.8
Jack Sikma	5	5	38.0	46.1	0.0	83.3	12.4	2.6	0.4	0.8	19.0
Sidney Moncrief	5	5	34.6	48.0	100.0	96.3	3.8	5.2	0.6	0.2	15.0
Paul Pressey	5	5	35.6	46.0	33.3	76.7	3.8	6.6	0.8	0.6	14.0
Ricky Pierce	5	0	21.0	47.2	20.0	88.9	2.8	1.8	0.2	0.4	11.8
Larry Krystkowiak	5	5	32.6	44.8	0.0	88.9	6.8	1.4	0.8	0.0	8.4
John Lucas	5	0	16.0	37.0	23.1	66.7	1.6	3.8	1.0	0.0	5.8
Randy Breuer	4	0	11.8	56.3	0.0	16.7	3.0	0.3	0.3	0.5	4.8
Paul Mokeski	4	0	10.0	35.7	0.0	66.7	2.3	0.0	0.8	0.5	3.5
John Stroeder	1	0	1.0	100.0	100.0	0.0	0.0	0.0	0.0	0.0	3.0
Jerry Reynolds	3	0	4.0	66.7	0.0	0.0	0.3	0.3	0.0	0.0	2.7
Jay Humphries	2	0	9.0	0.0	0.0	0.0	1.5	0.5	0.5	0.0	0.0

Player statistics citation:

== Awards and records ==
- The Bucks would win the inaugural 1987 McDonald's Open after winning games against the Tracer Milano from Italy and the Soviet Union national basketball team.

== Transactions ==
=== Trades ===
November 18, 1987

February 25, 1988
To Milwaukee Bucks----
- Larry Krystkowiak
To Milwaukee Bucks----
- Jay Humphries
To San Antonio Spurs----
- Charles Davis
To Phoenix Suns----
- Craig Hodges

=== Free agents ===
Player	Signed	Former team
Pace Mannion	October 8, 1987	New Jersey Nets
John Stroeder	October 8, 1987	Rapid City Thrillers

Player Transactions Citation:

== See also ==
- 1987-88 NBA season
