= 1987–88 Boston Celtics season =

NBA basketball team season

- Division champions
- Head coach: K. C. Jones
- General manager: Jan Volk
- Owners: Don Gaston; Alan N. Cohen; Paul Dupee
- Arena: Boston Garden; Hartford Civic Center

Results
- Record: 57–25 (.695)
- Place: Division: 1st (Atlantic); Conference: 1st (Eastern)
- Playoff finish: Eastern Conference finals (lost to Pistons 2–4)
- Stats at Basketball Reference

Local media
- Television: SportsChannel New England (Mike Gorman, Tom Heinsohn); WLVI, WTXX, WTIC-TV (Gil Santos, Bob Cousy)
- Radio: WEEI, WTIC Radio (Johnny Most, Glenn Ordway)

The 1987–88 Boston Celtics season was the 42nd season for the Boston Celtics in the National Basketball Association.

== Season summary ==
=== Off-season ===
The Celtics had the 22nd overall pick in the 1987 NBA draft, and selected small forward Reggie Lewis out of Northeastern University. During the off-season, the team signed rookie center Mark Acres, who previously played overseas in Belgium.

=== Regular season ===
Coming off from an NBA Finals defeat to their rivals, the Los Angeles Lakers in six games, the Celtics won their first six games of the regular season, then later on posted a seven-game winning streak in January, and held a 32–13 record at the All-Star break. At mid-season, the team traded Jerry Sichting to the Portland Trail Blazers in exchange for Jim Paxson. The Celtics posted an eight-game winning streak between March and April, but then lost four of their final six games of the season afterwards, winning the Atlantic Division title with a 57–25 record, and earning the first seed in the Eastern Conference.

Larry Bird averaged 29.9 points, 9.3 rebounds, 6.1 assists and 1.6 steals per game, contributed 98 three-point field goals, and was named to the All-NBA First Team, while Kevin McHale averaged 22.6 points, 8.4 rebounds and 1.4 blocks per game, led the league with .604 in field-goal percentage, and was named to the NBA All-Defensive First Team. In addition, Danny Ainge provided the team with 15.7 points, 6.2 assists and 1.4 steals per game, and also led them with 148 three-point field goals, while Robert Parish provided with 14.3 points and 8.5 rebounds per game, and Dennis Johnson contributed 12.6 points and 7.8 assists per game. Off the bench, Paxson contributed 8.7 points per game in 28 games after the trade, while Fred Roberts provided with 6.1 points per game, and Acres averaged 3.6 points and 3.4 rebounds per game.

During the NBA All-Star weekend at the Chicago Stadium in Chicago, Illinois, Bird, McHale and Ainge were all selected for the 1988 NBA All-Star Game, as members of the Eastern Conference All-Star team; it was Ainge's first and only All-Star appearance. In addition, Bird and Ainge both participated in the NBA Three-Point Shootout, in which Bird won for the third consecutive year. Bird also finished in second place in Most Valuable Player voting, behind Michael Jordan of the Chicago Bulls, while head coach K.C. Jones finished tied in sixth place in Coach of the Year voting.

The Celtics finished sixth in the NBA in home-game attendance, with an attendance of 611,231 at the Boston Garden during the regular season.

=== NBA playoffs ===
In the Eastern Conference First Round of the 1988 NBA playoffs, the Celtics faced off against the 8th–seeded New York Knicks, a team that featured All-Star center Patrick Ewing, Gerald Wilkins, and Rookie of the Year, Mark Jackson. The Celtics won the first two games over the Knicks at home at the Boston Garden, before losing Game 3 on the road, 109–100 at Madison Square Garden. The Celtics won Game 4 over the Knicks on the road, 102–94 to win the series in four games.

In the Eastern Conference Semi-finals, the team faced off against the 4th–seeded Atlanta Hawks, who were led by All-Star forward Dominique Wilkins, All-Star guard Doc Rivers, and Kevin Willis. The Celtics won the first two games over the Hawks at the Boston Garden, and took a 2–0 series lead. However, the Celtics lost the next three games, including a Game 5 home loss to the Hawks at the Boston Garden, 112–104 as the Hawks took a 3–2 series lead. However, the Celtics managed to win Game 6 on the road, 102–100 at the Omni Coliseum to even the series, and then won Game 7 over the Hawks at the Boston Garden, 118–116 to win in a hard-fought seven-game series. The Celtics advanced to the Eastern Conference Finals for the fifth consecutive year, becoming the first team to do so since the 1968–69 Boston Celtics (which reached the previous thirteen).

In the Conference Finals, and for the second consecutive year, the Celtics faced off against the 2nd–seeded, and Central Division champion Detroit Pistons, who were led by the trio of All-Star guard Isiah Thomas, Adrian Dantley and Joe Dumars. The Pistons took a 2–1 series lead, but the Celtics managed to win Game 4 on the road, 79–78 at the Pontiac Silverdome to even the series. However, the Celtics lost Game 5 to the Pistons at the Boston Garden in overtime, 102–96, before losing Game 6 at the Pontiac Silverdome by a score of 95–90, thus losing the series in six games; this was the first time since the 1982–83 season that the Celtics failed to advance to the NBA Finals.

The Pistons would advance to the Finals, but would lose to the defending NBA champion Los Angeles Lakers in a full seven-game series in the 1988 NBA Finals.

=== Aftermath ===
Following the season, Jones resigned as head coach, and Roberts was left unprotected in the 1988 NBA expansion draft, where he was selected by the Miami Heat expansion team, who then traded him to the Milwaukee Bucks.

== Draft picks ==
Round	Pick	Player	Position	Nationality	College
1	22	Reggie Lewis	SF	United States	Northeastern
2	45	Brad Lohaus	C/PF	United States	Iowa
4	70	Tom Sheehey		United States	Virginia
4	91	Darryl Kennedy		United States	Oklahoma
5	114	David Butler		United States	California
6	137	Tim Naegeli		United States	Wisconsin–Stevens Point
7	160	Jerry Corcoran		United States	Northeastern

== Roster ==
1987–88 Boston Celtics roster
Players

Pos.	No.	Player	Height	Weight	DOB	From
C	42	Mark Acres	6 ft 11 in (2.11 m)	220 lb (100 kg)	1962–11–15	Oral Roberts
G	44	Danny Ainge	6 ft 4 in (1.93 m)	175 lb (79 kg)	1959–03–17	BYU
F	33	Larry Bird	6 ft 9 in (2.06 m)	220 lb (100 kg)	1956–12–07	Indiana State
C	53	Artis Gilmore	7 ft 2 in (2.18 m)	240 lb (109 kg)	1949–09–21	Jacksonville
G	3	Dennis Johnson	6 ft 4 in (1.93 m)	185 lb (84 kg)	1954–09–18	Pepperdine
G/F	35	Reggie Lewis	6 ft 7 in (2.01 m)	195 lb (88 kg)	1965–11–21	Northeastern
F/C	54	Brad Lohaus	6 ft 11 in (2.11 m)	230 lb (104 kg)	1964–09–29	Iowa
F/C	32	Kevin McHale	6 ft 10 in (2.08 m)	210 lb (95 kg)	1957–12–19	Minnesota
G	11	Dirk Minniefield	6 ft 3 in (1.91 m)	180 lb (82 kg)	1961–01–17	Kentucky
C	00	Robert Parish	7 ft 0 in (2.13 m)	230 lb (104 kg)	1953–08–30	Centenary
G	4	Jim Paxson	6 ft 6 in (1.98 m)	200 lb (91 kg)	1957–07–09	Dayton
C	5	Bill Walton (IN)	6 ft 11 in (2.11 m)	235 lb (107 kg)	1952–11–05	UCLA
F	31	Fred Roberts	6 ft 10 in (2.08 m)	218 lb (99 kg)	1960–08–10	BYU

Coaches
Head coach
- K. C. Jones
Assistant(s)
- Ed Badger
- Chris Ford
- Jimmy Rodgers

Legend
- (DP) Unsigned draft pick
- (FA) Free agent
- (S) Suspended
- Injured

Roster

=== Roster notes ===
- Center Bill Walton was on the injured reserve list due to a right foot injury, and missed the entire regular season.

== Regular season ==
=== Season standings ===
Atlantic Division	W	L	PCT	GB	Home	Road	Div
y-Boston Celtics	57	25	.695	–	36–5	21–20	19–5
x-Washington Bullets	38	44	.463	19	25–16	13–28	13–11
x-New York Knicks	38	44	.463	19	29–12	9–32	10–14
Philadelphia 76ers	36	46	.439	21	27–14	9–32	12–12
New Jersey Nets	19	63	.232	38	16–25	3–38	6–18

#	Eastern Conference				
#	Team	W	L	PCT	GB
1	c-Boston Celtics	57	25	.695	–
2	y-Detroit Pistons	54	28	.659	3
3	x-Chicago Bulls	50	32	.610	7
4	x-Atlanta Hawks	50	32	.610	7
5	x-Milwaukee Bucks	42	40	.512	15
6	x-Cleveland Cavaliers	42	40	.512	15
7	x-Washington Bullets	38	44	.463	19
8	x-New York Knicks	38	44	.463	19
9	Indiana Pacers	38	44	.463	19
10	Philadelphia 76ers	36	46	.439	21
11	New Jersey Nets	19	63	.232	38

== Game log ==
=== Regular season ===
1987–88 game log
Total: 57–25 (home: 36–5; Away: 21–20)
November: 10–4 (home: 6–1; road: 4–3)

Game	Date	Team	Score	High points	High rebounds	High assists	Location Attendance	Record
1	November 6, 1987; 8:00 p.m. EST	Milwaukee	W 125–108	Bird (28)	Bird (15)	Bird, Johnson (8)	Boston Garden; 14,890	1–0
2	November 7, 1987; 7:30 p.m. EST	@ Washington	W 140–139 (2 OT)	Bird (47)	Parish (13)	Johnson (17)	Capital Centre; 19,643	2–0
3	November 9, 1987	@ New York	W 96–87				Madison Square Garden	3–0
4	November 11, 1987	Indiana	W 120–106				Boston Garden	4–0
5	November 13, 1987; 7:30 p.m. EST	Cleveland	W 128–114	Bird (34)	Parish (16)	Johnson (13)	Boston Garden; 14,890	5–0
6	November 15, 1987	@ Indiana	W 103–98				Market Square Arena	6–0
7	November 17, 1987; 8:00 p.m. EST	@ Cleveland	L 88–109	Johnson (16)	Acres (8)	Bird (4)	Richfield Coliseum; 14,621	6–1
8	November 18, 1987	New York	W 111–109 (2OT)				Boston Garden	7–1
9	November 20, 1987	@ Philadelphia	L 85–116				The Spectrum	7–2
10	November 21, 1987	@ New Jersey	W 107–97				Brendan Byrne Arena	8–2
11	November 23, 1987; 7:30 p.m. EST	Chicago (at Hartford, Connecticut)	L 102–107	Johnson (23)	Lohaus, Parish (9)	Johnson (7)	Hartford Civic Center; 15,134	8–3
12	November 25, 1987; 7:30 p.m. EST	Atlanta	W 117–102	Daye (26)	Parish (13)	Ainge (10)	Boston Garden; 14,890	9–3
13	November 27, 1987; 7:30 p.m. EST	Seattle	W 117–112	Daye (27)	Bird (10)	Bird (9)	Boston Garden; 14,890	10–3
14	November 28, 1987; 9:00 p.m. EST	@ Milwaukee	L 97–112	Bird (28)	Parish (13)	Johnson (9)	MECCA Arena; 11,052	10–4

December: 7–5 (home: 3–2; road: 4–3)

Game	Date	Team	Score	High points	High rebounds	High assists	Location Attendance	Record
15	December 1, 1987; 7:30 p.m. EST	@ Atlanta	L 106–120	McHale (22)	Bird, Lohaus (8)	Johnson (8)	The Omni; 16,451	10–5
16	December 2, 1987	New Jersey	W 130–99				Boston Garden	11–5
17	December 4, 1987; 7:30 p.m. EST	@ Detroit	L 105–128	Bird (27)	Parish (11)	Johnson (6)	Pontiac Silverdome; 34,523	11–6
18	December 9, 1987; 7:30 p.m. EST	Denver	L 119–124	Bird (40)	Parish (14)	Johnson (15)	Boston Garden; 14,890	11–7
19	December 11; 8:00 p.m. EST	L.A. Lakers	L 114–115	Bird (35)	Bird, Parish (9)	Bird (8)	Boston Garden; 14,890	11–8
20	December 15, 1987; 7:30 p.m. EST	@ Washington	W 122–102	Bird (27)	McHale (8)	Johnson (8)	Capital Centre; 15,890	12–8
21	December 16, 1987; 7:30 p.m. EST	Utah	W 121–111	Bird (38)	Parish (14)	Johnson (11)	Boston Garden; 14,890	13–8
22	December 20, 1987	Philadelphia	W 124–87				Boston Garden	14–8
23	December 22, 1987	@ Philadelphia	W 118–115				The Spectrum	15–8
24	December 26, 1987	@ L.A. Clippers	W 106–97				Los Angeles Memorial Sports Arena	16–8
25	December 27, 1987	@ Sacramento	W 114–102				ARCO Arena	17–8
26	December 30, 1987; 10:30 p.m. EST	@ Seattle	L 105–111	Bird (36)	Bird (15)	Bird (8)	Seattle Center Coliseum; 14,850	17–9

January: 14–3 (home: 9–0; road: 5–3)

Game	Date	Team	Score	High points	High rebounds	High assists	Location Attendance	Record
27	January 2, 1988	@ Golden State	W 115–110				Oakland-Alameda County Coliseum Arena	18–9
28	January 4, 1988; 9:30 p.m. EST	@ Utah	W 107–99	Bird (28)	Parish (10)	Johnson (12)	Salt Palace; 12,212	19–9
29	January 6, 1988	New York	W 117–108				Boston Garden	20–9
30	January 8, 1988; 7:30 p.m. EST	Washington	W 125–109	Bird (35)	Bird (11)	Johnson (10)	Boston Garden; 14,890	21–9
31	January 9, 1988	@ New York	L 98–106				Madison Square Garden	21–10
32	January 12, 1988; 8:00 p.m. EST	@ Chicago	W 104–97	Bird (38)	Parish (16)	Ainge, Minniefield (9)	Chicago Stadium; 18,676	22–10
33	January 13, 1988; 7:30 p.m. EST	Detroit	W 143–105	McHale (31)	Bird, McHale (7)	Bird (13)	Boston Garden; 14,890	23–10
34	January 15, 1988	Sacramento	W 122–86				Boston Garden	24–10
35	January 16, 1988	@ New Jersey	W 103–96				Brendan Byrne Arena	25–10
36	January 18, 1988	Golden State	W 121–101				Boston Garden	26–10
37	January 20, 1988	Phoenix	W 131–115				Boston Garden	27–10
38	January 22, 1988; 8:00 p.m. EST	Atlanta	W 124–106	Bird (25)	Parish (12)	Ainge (11)	Boston Garden; 14,890	28–10
39	January 23, 1988; 7:30 p.m. EST	@ Cleveland	L 100–119	Bird (32)	McHale (17)	Johnson (5)	Richfield Coliseum; 20,900	28–11
40	January 26, 1988; 7:30 p.m. EST	@ Atlanta	W 102–97	McHale (21)	Parish (14)	Ainge (10)	The Omni; 16,451	29–11
41	January 27, 1988; 7:30 p.m. EST	Washington	W 106–100	Bird (49)	Parish (12)	Ainge (13)	Boston Garden; 14,890	30–11
42	January 29, 1988; 8:00 p.m. EST	@ Detroit	L 108–125	Bird (25)	Bird (11)	Bird (8)	Pontiac Silverdome; 61,983	30–12
43	January 31, 1988	Philadelphia	W 100–85				Boston Garden	31–12

February: 9–5 (home: 5–0; road: 4–5)

Game	Date	Team	Score	High points	High rebounds	High assists	Location Attendance	Record
44	February 3, 1988	Indiana	W 118–103				Boston Garden	32–12
45	February 4, 1988; 8:30 p.m. EST	@ Milwaukee	L 101–111	McHale (25)	Bird (12)	Johnson (6)	MECCA Arena; 11,052	32–13
All-Star Break
46	February 9, 1988	@ Houston	L 120–129				The Summit	32–14
47	February 10, 1988	@ San Antonio	W 139–120				HemisFair Arena	33–14
48	February 12, 1988; 8:30 p.m. EST	@ Dallas	W 105–104	Bird (39)	McHale, Parish (15)	Johnson (11)	Reunion Arena; 17,007	34–14
49	February 14; 3:30 p.m. EST	@ L.A. Lakers	L 106–115	Bird (25)	Bird (17)	Johnson (10)	The Forum; 17,505	34–15
50	February 15, 1988	@ Phoenix	W 107–106				Arizona Veterans Memorial Coliseum	35–15
51	February 17, 1988; 9:30 p.m. EST	@ Denver	L 125–138	McHale (33)	McHale (11)	Minniefield (6)	McNichols Sports Arena; 17,022	35–16
52	February 19, 1988	@ Portland	W 124–104				Memorial Coliseum	36–16
53	February 22, 1988	New York	W 95–93				Hartford Civic Center	37–16
54	February 24, 1988	Portland	W 113–112				Boston Garden	38–16
55	February 26, 1988; 7:30 p.m. EST	Milwaukee	W 132–96	Bird (32)	McHale (8)	Bird, Johnson (8)	Boston Garden; 14,890	39–16
56	February 28, 1988; 12 Noon EST	@ Detroit	L 101–106	McHale (33)	McHale (11)	Bird (9)	Pontiac Silverdome; 37,462	39–17

March: 11–4 (home: 8–2; road: 3–2)

Game	Date	Team	Score	High points	High rebounds	High assists	Location Attendance	Record
57	March 1, 1988; 8:00 p.m. EST	@ Milwaukee	L 116–117	Bird (31)	Bird, McHale (7)	Ainge (10)	MECCA Arena; 11,052	39–18
58	March 2, 1988	New Jersey	L 107–117				Boston Garden	39–19
59	March 4, 1988	L.A. Clippers	W 121–90				Boston Garden	40–19
60	March 6, 1988; 1:00 p.m. EST	Cleveland	W 127–98	Bird (31)	McHale (8)	Ainge, Johnson (6)	Boston Garden; 14,890	41–19
61	March 9, 1988	San Antonio	W 117–116				Boston Garden	42–19
62	March 11, 1988	Indiana	W 122–112				Hartford Civic Center	43–19
63	March 13, 1988; 12 Noon EST	Atlanta	W 117–100	Bird (28)	Acres (11)	Johnson (9)	Boston Garden; 14,890	44–19
64	March 15, 1988	@ Indiana	W 119–113				Market Square Arena	45–19
65	March 18, 1988; 8:30 p.m. EST	@ Chicago	L 103–113	McHale (33)	Bird, McHale (10)	Ainge (9)	Chicago Stadium; 18,676	45–20
66	March 20, 1988; 1:00 p.m. EST	Chicago	W 137–107	Bird (33)	McHale (10)	Johnson (10)	Boston Garden; 14,890	46–20
67	March 23, 1988; 7:30 p.m. EST	Washington	W 104–89	Bird (37)	Bird (14)	Bird (8)	Boston Garden; 14,890	47–20
68	March 25, 1988	Philadelphia	L 93–97				Boston Garden	47–21
69	March 26, 1988	@ New York	W 118–106				Madison Square Garden	48–21
70	March 28, 1988	@ New Jersey	W 106–105				Brendan Byrne Arena	49–21
71	March 30, 1988	Houston	W 117–110				Boston Garden	50–21

April: 7–4 (home: 6–0; road: 1–4)

Game	Date	Team	Score	High points	High rebounds	High assists	Location Attendance	Record
72	April 1, 1988; 8:00 p.m. EST	Detroit	W 121–110	Bird (32)	Bird, McHale (11)	Johnson (10)	Boston Garden; 14,890	51–21
73	April 3, 1988; 1:00 p.m. EDT	Dallas	W 110–101	Bird (32)	McHale (7)	McHale (10)	Boston Garden; 14,890	52–21
74	April 8, 1988	New Jersey	W 127–90				Boston Garden	53–21
75	April 10, 1988	@ Philadelphia	W 117–108				The Spectrum	54–21
76	April 13, 1988; 7:30 p.m. EDT	Milwaukee	W 123–104	Bird (26)	Bird; McHale (10)	Bird (10)	Boston Garden; 14,890	55–21
77	April 15, 1988; 7:30 p.m. EDT	@ Cleveland	L 109–120	Bird (30)	Parish (9)	Bird (8)	Richfield Coliseum; 20,149	55–22
78	April 17, 1988; 3:30 p.m. EDT	@ Washington	L 92–98	Bird (23)	Bird (7)	Ainge (9)	Capital Centre; 18,643	55–23
79	April 19, 1988; 7:30 p.m. EDT	Detroit	W 121–110	McHale (33)	Parish (12)	Bird (9)	Boston Garden; 14,890	56–23
80	April 21, 1988; 7:30 p.m. EDT	Chicago	W 126–119	Bird (44)	Bird, Parish (10)	Johson (15)	Boston Garden; 14,890	57–23
81	April 22, 1988; 7:30 p.m. EDT	@ Atlanta	L 106–133	Ainge (25)	Parish (7)	Ainge, Johnson,,Parish, Roberts (4)	The Omni; 16,451	57–24
82	April 24, 1988; 3:30 p.m. EDT	@ Chicago	L 108–115	Ainge (20)	Acres (9)	Ainge (11)	Chicago Stadium; 18,636	57–25

1987–88 schedule

=== Playoffs ===
1988 playoff game log
First round: 3–1 (home: 2–0; road: 1–1)

Game	Date	Team	Score	High points	High rebounds	High assists	Location Attendance	Series
1	April 29	New York	W 112–92	McHale, Bird (29)	Robert Parish (13)	Dennis Johnson (9)	Boston Garden; 14,890	1–0
2	May 1	New York	W 128–102	Larry Bird (36)	Kevin McHale (12)	Dennis Johnson (9)	Boston Garden; 14,890	2–0
3	May 4	@ New York	L 100–109	Kevin McHale (24)	Robert Parish (11)	Larry Bird (12)	Madison Square Garden; 19,591	2–1
4	May 6	@ New York	W 102–94	Larry Bird (28)	Robert Parish (12)	Dennis Johnson (12)	Madison Square Garden; 19,591	3–1

Eastern Conference Semifinals: 4–3 (home: 3–1; road: 1–2)

Game	Date	Team	Score	High points	High rebounds	High assists	Location Attendance	Series
1	May 11, 1988; 8:30 p.m. EDT	Atlanta	W 110–101	Bird (38)	Parish (14)	Ainge (12)	Boston Garden; 14,890	1–0
2	May 13, 1988; 8:00 p.m. EDT	Atlanta	W 108–97	McHale (32)	Parish (14)	Johnson (9)	Boston Garden; 14,890	2–0
3	May 15, 1988; 1:00 p.m. EDT	@ Atlanta	L 92–110	Bird (22)	Parish (13)	Bird (8)	The Omni; 16,451	2–1
4	May 16, 1988; 8:00 p.m. EDT	@ Atlanta	L 109–118	Bird (30)	McHale (12)	Johnson (10)	The Omni; 16,451	2–2
5	May 18, 1988; 8:00 p.m. EDT	Atlanta	L 104–112	Parish (24)	Parish (13)	Johnson (10)	Boston Garden; 14,890	2–3
6	May 20, 1988; 8:00 p.m. EDT	@ Atlanta	W 102–100	McHale (26)	Bird (11)	Ainge (14)	The Omni; 16,451	3–3
7	May 22, 1988; 1:00 p.m. EDT	Atlanta	W 118–116	Bird (34)	McHale (13)	Ainge (10)	Boston Garden; 14,890	4–3

Eastern Conference Finals: 2–4 (home: 1–2; road: 1–2)

Game	Date	Team	Score	High points	High rebounds	High assists	Location Attendance	Series
1	May 25, 1988; 8:00 p.m. EDT	Detroit	L 96–104	McHale (31)	Parish (13)	Johnson (10)	Boston Garden; 14,890	0–1
2	May 26, 1988; 8:00 p.m. EDT	Detroit	W 119–115 (2OT)	Parish (26)	Bird (12)	Johnson (10)	Boston Garden; 14,890	1–1
3	May 28, 1988; 3:30 p.m. EDT	@ Detroit	L 94–98	McHale (32)	Bird (11)	Bird (8)	Pontiac Silverdome; 26,481	1–2
4	May 30, 1988; 3:00 p.m. EDT	@ Detroit	W 79–78	Bird (20)	Bird (10)	Bird, Johnson (6)	Pontiac Silverdome; 26,625	2–2
5	June 1, 1988; 8:00 p.m. EDT	Detroit	L 96–102 (OT)	Bird (27)	Bird (17)	Johnson (8)	Boston Garden; 14,890	2–3
6	June 3, 1988; 9:00 p.m. EST	@ Detroit	L 90–95	McHale (33)	Bird (14)	Johnson (9)	Pontiac Silverdome; 38,912	2–4

1988 schedule

== Player statistics ==
Legend
GP	Games played	GS	Games started	MPG	Minutes per game
FG%	Field-goal percentage	3P%	3-point field-goal percentage	FT%	Free-throw percentage
RPG	Rebounds per game	APG	Assists per game	SPG	Steals per game
BPG	Blocks per game	PPG	Points per game

=== Playoffs ===
The Celtics would end up losing to the Detroit Pistons in the conference finals, as an aging Celtics team was beginning to falter against a younger and fresher Pistons team led by Isiah Thomas. This also marked that franchise's "Bad Boy" era, noted for the team's penchant for fighting and rough, physical play. This would be the first time in five years that the Celtics would not make it to the finals and would not return to another finals until 2008.

== Awards and records ==
- Larry Bird, All-NBA First Team
- Kevin McHale, NBA All-Defensive First Team

== See also ==
- 1987–88 NBA season
