= 1987–88 Chicago Bulls season =

NBA professional basketball team season

- Head coach: Doug Collins
- General manager: Jerry Krause
- Owner: Jerry Reinsdorf
- Arena: Chicago Stadium

Results
- Record: 50–32 (.610)
- Place: Division: 2nd (Central); Conference: 3rd (Eastern)
- Playoff finish: Conference semifinals (lost to Pistons 1–4)
- Stats at Basketball Reference

Local media
- Television: WFLD; Sportsvision (Jim Durham, Johnny “Red” Kerr)
- Radio: WMAQ (Jim Durham, Johnny “Red” Kerr)

The 1987–88 Chicago Bulls season was the 22nd season for the Chicago Bulls in the National Basketball Association. The city of Chicago, Illinois hosted the NBA All-Star weekend at the Chicago Stadium this season.

== Season summary ==
=== Off-season ===
The Bulls received the eighth overall pick in the 1987 NBA draft, and selected center Olden Polynice from the University of Virginia; however, the team soon traded Polynice to the Seattle SuperSonics in exchange for rookie small forward, and first-round draft pick Scottie Pippen from the University of Central Arkansas on draft day. The Bulls also had the tenth overall pick, and selected power forward Horace Grant out of Clemson University.

=== Regular season ===
With the addition of Pippen and Grant, the Bulls won their first four games of the regular season, but posted a five-game losing streak after a 15–7 start to the season, and later on held a 27–18 record at the All-Star break. At mid-season, the team traded Sedale Threatt to the SuperSonics in exchange for Sam Vincent. The Bulls posted a six-game winning streak in April, and finished in second place in the Central Division with a 50–32 record, earning the third seed in the Eastern Conference.

Michael Jordan led the league in scoring averaging 35.0 points, 5.5 rebounds, 5.9 assists, 3.2 steals and 1.6 blocks per game, shot .535 in field-goal percentage, and was named the NBA Most Valuable Player of the Year, and also named the NBA Defensive Player of the Year; he was also named to the All-NBA First Team, and to the NBA All-Defensive First Team. In addition, Charles Oakley averaged 12.4 points and 13.0 rebounds per game, while Vincent contributed 13.0 points and 8.4 assists per game in 29 games after the trade, Dave Corzine provided the team with 10.1 points, 6.6 rebounds and 1.2 blocks per game, and Brad Sellers contributed 9.5 points per game. Off the bench, Pippen averaged 7.9 points, 3.8 rebounds and 1.2 steals per game, while Grant provided with 7.7 points and 5.5 rebounds per game, John Paxson contributed 7.9 points and 3.7 assists per game, and Mike Brown averaged 4.3 points and 3.5 rebounds per game.

During the NBA All-Star weekend at the Chicago Stadium in Chicago, Jordan was selected for the 1988 NBA All-Star Game, as a member of the Eastern Conference All-Star team. Jordan scored 40 points along with 8 rebounds, 4 steals and 4 blocks, and was named the NBA All-Star Game Most Valuable Player, as the Eastern Conference defeated the Western Conference, 138–133. In addition, Jordan also won the NBA Slam Dunk Contest for the second consecutive year; Pippen was also selected for the Slam Dunk Contest, but did not participate. Head coach Doug Collins finished tied in third place in Coach of the Year voting.

The Bulls finished second in the NBA in home-game attendance behind the Pistons, with an attendance of 740,411 at the Chicago Stadium during the regular season.

=== NBA playoffs ===
In the Eastern Conference First Round of the 1988 NBA playoffs, the Bulls faced off against the 6th–seeded Cleveland Cavaliers, a team that featured the quartet of All-Star center, and second-year star Brad Daugherty, Larry Nance, second-year star Mark Price, and second-year star Ron Harper. The Bulls won the first two games over the Cavaliers at home at the Chicago Stadium, but then lost the next two games on the road, which included a Game 4 loss to the Cavaliers at the Coliseum at Richfield, 97–91. With the series tied at 2–2, the Bulls won Game 5 over the Cavaliers at the Chicago Stadium, 107–101 to win in a hard-fought five-game series; Jordan averaged 45.2 points per game during the series.

In the Eastern Conference Semi-finals, the team faced off against the 2nd–seeded, and Central Division champion Detroit Pistons, who were led by the trio of All-Star guard Isiah Thomas, Adrian Dantley and Joe Dumars. The Bulls lost Game 1 to the Pistons on the road, 93–82 at the Pontiac Silverdome, but managed to win Game 2 on the road, 105–95 to even the series. However, the Bulls lost their next two home games at the Chicago Stadium, before losing Game 5 to the Pistons at the Pontiac Silverdome, 102–95, thus losing the series in five games.

The Pistons would advance to the NBA Finals, but would lose to the defending NBA champion Los Angeles Lakers in a full seven-game series in the 1988 NBA Finals.

=== Aftermath ===
Following the season, Oakley was traded to the New York Knicks after three seasons with the Bulls, and Brown was left unprotected in the 1988 NBA expansion draft, where he was selected by the Charlotte Hornets expansion team, who then traded him to the Utah Jazz. The Bulls had the third-best team defensive rating in the NBA.

== NBA draft ==
Note: This is not an extensive list; it only covers the first round, and notable post-first-round picks.

| Round | Pick | Player | Position | Nationality | School/Club team |
|---|---|---|---|---|---|
| 1 | 8 | Olden Polynice (traded to Seattle) | C | Haiti | Virginia |
| 1 | 10 | Horace Grant | PF | United States | Clemson |
| 2 | 28 | Rickie Winslow | F | United States | Houston |
| 4 | 79 | Jack Haley | C | United States | UCLA |

== Roster ==
1987–88 Chicago Bulls roster
Players

| Pos. | No. | Player | Height | Weight | DOB | From |
|---|---|---|---|---|---|---|
| C | 17 | Mike Brown | 6 ft 9 in (2.06 m) | 257 lb (117 kg) | 1963–07–19 | George Washington |
| C | 40 | Dave Corzine | 6 ft 11 in (2.11 m) | 250 lb (113 kg) | 1956–04–25 | DePaul |
| F | 54 | Horace Grant | 6 ft 10 in (2.08 m) | 245 lb (111 kg) | 1965–07–04 | Clemson |
| G | 23 | Michael Jordan | 6 ft 6 in (1.98 m) | 216 lb (98 kg) | 1963–02–17 | North Carolina |
| F | 34 | Charles Oakley | 6 ft 8 in (2.03 m) | 225 lb (102 kg) | 1963–12–18 | Virginia Union |
| G | 5 | John Paxson | 6 ft 2 in (1.88 m) | 185 lb (84 kg) | 1960–09–29 | Notre Dame |
| F | 33 | Scottie Pippen | 6 ft 7 in (2.01 m) | 220 lb (100 kg) | 1965–09–25 | Central Arkansas |
| F | 6 | Brad Sellers | 7 ft 0 in (2.13 m) | 210 lb (95 kg) | 1962–12–17 | Ohio State |
| G | 2 | Rory Sparrow | 6 ft 2 in (1.88 m) | 175 lb (79 kg) | 1958–06–12 | Villanova |
| F | 21 | Elston Turner | 6 ft 5 in (1.96 m) | 190 lb (86 kg) | 1959–06–10 | Mississippi |
| G | 11 | Sam Vincent | 6 ft 2 in (1.88 m) | 185 lb (84 kg) | 1963–05–18 | Michigan State |
| C | 31 | Granville Waiters | 6 ft 11 in (2.11 m) | 225 lb (102 kg) | 1961–01–08 | Ohio State |

Coaches
Head coach
- Doug Collins
Assistant(s)
- Johnny Bach
- Phil Jackson
- Tex Winter

Legend
- (DP) Unsigned draft pick
- (FA) Free agent
- (S) Suspended
- Injured

Roster
Updated: February 25, 1988

== Regular season ==
Jordan was great, and Oakley led the league in total rebounds (1,066). Still, the Bulls lacked a quality supporting cast. They took a major step toward alleviating that problem at the 1987 NBA draft, when Vice President of Basketball Operations Jerry Krause acquired two players who would be vital cogs in Chicago's future championship machine. With two picks in the top 10, Krause selected Olden Polynice at No. 8 and Horace Grant at No. 10. He then traded Polynice and draft considerations to the Seattle SuperSonics for Scottie Pippen, whom the Sonics had grabbed with the fifth pick.

With Grant and Pippen on board, the Bulls in 1987–88 forged a 50–32 record, their best mark since 1973-74. Chicago finished in a second-place tie with Atlanta in a competitive Central Division won by the surging Detroit Pistons. The Bulls in the playoffs, defeated the Cleveland Cavaliers in a five-game first-round series, but then fell to Detroit in the Eastern Conference semifinals.

Oakley and the Los Angeles Clippers' Michael Cage engaged in a nip-and-tuck battle for the league's rebounding title, which came down to the last day of the regular season. On April 22 against Cleveland, Oakley put the pressure on Cage by pulling down 35 rebounds, the second-highest total in Bulls history behind Tom Boerwinkle's 37 in 1970. Two days later, however, Cage grabbed 30 boards in a game against Seattle, just enough to edge Oakley by the slimmest of margins, 13.03 per game to 13.00. Cage played in 10 fewer games than Oakley, however, so Oakley led the NBA in total rebounds for the second consecutive year, with 1,066.

Jordan led the league in scoring (35.0 ppg) and steals (3.16 per game). He won almost every major award, including Most Valuable Player, Defensive Player of the Year, All-NBA First Team Honors and NBA All-Defensive First Team Honors.

=== Season standings ===
| Central Division | W | L | PCT | GB | Home | Road | Div |
|---|---|---|---|---|---|---|---|
| y-Detroit Pistons | 54 | 28 | .659 | – | 34–7 | 20–21 | 20–10 |
| x-Chicago Bulls | 50 | 32 | .610 | 4 | 30–11 | 20–21 | 16–13 |
| x-Atlanta Hawks | 50 | 32 | .610 | 4 | 30-11 | 20-21 | 16–13 |
| x-Milwaukee Bucks | 42 | 40 | .512 | 12 | 30–11 | 12–29 | 13–17 |
| x-Cleveland Cavaliers | 42 | 40 | .512 | 12 | 31–10 | 11–30 | 11–19 |
| Indiana Pacers | 38 | 44 | .463 | 16 | 25–16 | 13–28 | 13–17 |

| # | Eastern Conference | | | | |
| # | Team | W | L | PCT | GB |
|---|---|---|---|---|---|
| 1 | c-Boston Celtics | 57 | 25 | .695 | – |
| 2 | y-Detroit Pistons | 54 | 28 | .659 | 3 |
| 3 | x-Chicago Bulls | 50 | 32 | .610 | 7 |
| 4 | x-Atlanta Hawks | 50 | 32 | .610 | 7 |
| 5 | x-Milwaukee Bucks | 42 | 40 | .512 | 15 |
| 6 | x-Cleveland Cavaliers | 42 | 40 | .512 | 15 |
| 7 | x-Washington Bullets | 38 | 44 | .463 | 19 |
| 8 | x-New York Knicks | 38 | 44 | .463 | 19 |
| 9 | Indiana Pacers | 38 | 44 | .463 | 19 |
| 10 | Philadelphia 76ers | 36 | 46 | .439 | 21 |
| 11 | New Jersey Nets | 19 | 63 | .232 | 38 |

=== Record vs. opponents ===
==== vs. Eastern Conference ====
vs. Atlantic Division

1987–88 NBA records
| Team | BOS | NJN | NYK | PHI | WSB | Total |
|---|---|---|---|---|---|---|
| Atlanta | 2–4 | 5–0 | 3–3 | 6–0 | 3–3 | 19–10 |
| Chicago | 3–3 | 5–1 | 3–2 | 4–2 | 3–3 | 18–11 |
| Cleveland | 3–2 | 5–1 | 2–4 | 3–2 | 6–0 | 19–9 |
| Detroit | 3–3 | 5–1 | 4–2 | 4–1 | 3–2 | 19–9 |
| Indiana | 0–5 | 6–0 | 2–3 | 2–4 | 2–4 | 12–16 |
| Milwaukee | 3–3 | 3–2 | 3–3 | 2–4 | 4–1 | 15–13 |

vs. Central Division

1987–88 NBA records
| Team | ATL | CHI | CLE | DET | IND | MIL | Total |
|---|---|---|---|---|---|---|---|
| Atlanta | — | 2–3 | 5–1 | 2–4 | 3–3 | 4–2 | 16–13 |
| Chicago | 3–2 | — | 3–3 | 2–4 | 3–3 | 5–1 | 16–13 |
| Cleveland | 1–5 | 3–3 | — | 1–5 | 4–2 | 2–4 | 11–19 |
| Detroit | 4–2 | 4–2 | 5–1 | — | 3–3 | 4–2 | 20–10 |
| Indiana | 2–4 | 3–3 | 2–4 | 3–3 | — | 3–3 | 13–17 |
| Milwaukee | 3–3 | 1–5 | 4–2 | 2–4 | 3–3 | — | 13–17 |

==== vs. Western Conference ====
vs. Midwest Division

1987–88 NBA records
| Team | DAL | DEN | HOU | SAC | SAS | UTA | Total |
|---|---|---|---|---|---|---|---|
| Atlanta | 2–0 | 1–1 | 1–1 | 1–1 | 2–0 | 1–1 | 8–4 |
| Chicago | 0–2 | 1–1 | 2–0 | 1–1 | 1–1 | 2–0 | 7–5 |
| Cleveland | 1–1 | 1–1 | 1–1 | 2–0 | 2–0 | 0–2 | 7–5 |
| Detroit | 1–1 | 1–1 | 1–1 | 2–0 | 1–1 | 2–0 | 8–4 |
| Indiana | 0–2 | 1–1 | 0–2 | 2–0 | 2–0 | 1–1 | 6–6 |
| Milwaukee | 0–2 | 1–1 | 0–2 | 2–0 | 1–1 | 1–1 | 5–7 |

vs. Pacific Division

1987–88 NBA records
| Team | GSW | LAC | LAL | PHO | POR | SEA | Total |
|---|---|---|---|---|---|---|---|
| Atlanta | 2–0 | 2–0 | 0–2 | 1–1 | 0–2 | 2–0 | 7–5 |
| Chicago | 2–0 | 2–0 | 1–1 | 2–0 | 1–1 | 1–1 | 9–3 |
| Cleveland | 0–2 | 1–1 | 1–1 | 1–1 | 1–1 | 1–1 | 5–7 |
| Detroit | 2–0 | 1–1 | 0–2 | 2–0 | 1–1 | 1–1 | 7–5 |
| Indiana | 2–0 | 1–1 | 1–1 | 2–0 | 0–2 | 1–1 | 7–5 |
| Milwaukee | 2–0 | 2–0 | 2–0 | 1–1 | 1–1 | 1–1 | 9–3 |

== Game log ==
=== Regular season ===
1987–88 game log
Total: 50–32 (home: 30–11; road: 20–21)
November: 10–3 (home: 4–2; road: 6–1)

| Game | Date | Team | Score | High points | High rebounds | High assists | Location Attendance | Record |
|---|---|---|---|---|---|---|---|---|
| 1 | November 7, 1987 | Philadelphia | W 104–94 | | | | Chicago Stadium | 1–0 |
| 2 | November 10, 1987; 7:00 p.m. CST | @ Atlanta | W 105–95 | Jordan (29) | Oakley (15) | Jordan (7) | The Omni; 16,451 | 2–0 |
| 3 | November 11, 1987 | @ New Jersey | W 105–96 | | | | Brendan Byrne Arena | 3–0 |
| 4 | November 13, 1987 | New Jersey | W 117–103 | | | | Chicago Stadium | 4–0 |
| 5 | November 14, 1987 | Indiana | L 110–101 | | | | Chicago Stadium | 4–1 |
| 6 | November 17, 1987; 7:30 p.m. CST | Washington | W 105–101 | Jordan (26) | Oakley (21) | Paxson (8) | Chicago Stadium; 17,081 | 5–1 |
| 7 | November 18, 1987; 6:30 p.m. CST | @ Washington | W 84–82 | Jordan (30) | Oakley (24) | Jordan (8) | Capital Centre; 13,721 | 6–1 |
| 8 | November 20, 1987; 7:30 p.m. CST | Atlanta | W 94–92 | Jordan (33) | Oakley (17) | Jordan, Paxson (7) | Chicago Stadium; 18,423 | 7–1 |
| 9 | November 21, 1987; 7:30 p.m. CST | Detroit | L 132–144 (OT) | Jordan (49) | Oakley (12) | Jordan (8) | Chicago Stadium; 18,466 | 7–2 |
| 10 | November 23, 1987; 6:30 p.m. CST | @ Boston (at Hartford) | W 107–102 | Jordan (31) | Jordan (10) | Paxson (6) | Hartford Civic Center; 15,134 | 8–2 |
| 11 | November 25, 1987; 7:30 p.m. CST | @ Milwaukee | W 103–101 | Jordan (33) | Oakley (14) | Jordan (6) | MECCA Arena; 11,052 | 9–2 |
| 12 | November 27, 1987; 7:00 p.m. CST | @ Dallas | L 93–94 | Jordan (26) | Oakley (17) | Jordan (9) | Reunion Arena; 17,007 | 9–3 |
| 13 | November 28, 1987 | @ Houston | W 98–86 | | | | The Summit | 10–3 |

December: 5–9 (home: 3–3; road: 2–6)

| Game | Date | Team | Score | High points | High rebounds | High assists | Location Attendance | Record |
|---|---|---|---|---|---|---|---|---|
| 14 | December 1, 1987 | @ Golden State | W 98–97 | | | | Oakland–Alameda County Coliseum Arena | 11–3 |
| 15 | December 2, 1987; 8:30 p.m. CST | @ Utah | W 105–101 | Jordan (47) | Oakley (9) | Jordan (9) | Salt Palace Acord Arena; 12,212 | 12–3 |
| 16 | December 4, 1987; 8:30 p.m. CST | @ Denver | L 89–105 | Jordan (23) | Oakley (18) | Paxson (6) | McNichols Sports Arena; 17,022 | 12–4 |
| 17 | December 5, 1987 | @ San Antonio | L 101–110 | | | | HemisFair Arena | 12–5 |
| 18 | December 8, 1987 | Philadelphia | L 96–109 | | | | Chicago Stadium | 12–6 |
| 19 | December 10, 1987; 7:30 p.m. CST | Milwaukee | W 111–105 | Jordan (32) | Oakley (13) | Oakley (8) | Chicago Stadium; 17,820 | 13–6 |
| 20 | December 12, 1987 | Houston | W 112–103 | | | | Chicago Stadium | 14–6 |
| 21 | December 15, 1987; 7:00 p.m. CST | @ Detroit | L 123–127 (OT) | Jordan (38) | Oakley (17) | Jordan (12) | Pontiac Silverdome; 23,729 | 14–7 |
| 22 | December 17, 1987; 7:30 p.m. CST | Cleveland | W 111–100 | Jordan (52) | Corzine (9) | Paxson (13) | Chicago Stadium; 17,650 | 15–7 |
| 23 | December 19, 1987; 6:30 p.m. CST | @ Washington | L 96–109 | Jordan (30) | Oakley (16) | Jordan (7) | Capital Centre; 14,353 | 15–8 |
| 24 | December 22, 1987; 7:00 p.m. CST | Dallas | L 100–111 | Jordan (28) | Oakley (10) | Paxson (9) | Chicago Stadium; 18,103 | 15–9 |
| 25 | December 23, 1987 | @ New York | L 89–90 | | | | Madison Square Garden | 15–10 |
| 26 | December 26, 1987 | @ Indiana | L 92–106 | | | | Market Square Arena | 15–11 |
| 27 | December 29, 1987; 7:30 p.m. CST | Atlanta | L 98–108 | Jordan (39) | Oakley (13) | Jordan (6) | Chicago Stadium; 18,676 | 15–12 |

January: 11–4 (home: 10–1; road: 1–3)

| Game | Date | Team | Score | High points | High rebounds | High assists | Location Attendance | Record |
|---|---|---|---|---|---|---|---|---|
| 28 | January 2, 1988 | New Jersey | W 116–93 | | | | Chicago Stadium | 16–12 |
| 29 | January 5, 1988 | Indiana | W 93–77 | | | | Chicago Stadium | 17–12 |
| 30 | January 7, 1988; 7:30 p.m. CST | Denver | W 100–96 | Jordan (28) | Oakley (14) | Sparrow (8) | Chicago Stadium; 17,590 | 18–12 |
| 31 | January 9, 1988; 7:30 p.m. CST | Utah | W 113–91 | Jordan (45) | Oakley (15) | Jordan (8) | Chicago Stadium; 17,877 | 19–12 |
| 32 | January 12, 1988; 7:00 p.m. CST | Boston | L 97–104 | Jordan (42) | Oakley (11) | Oakley (8) | Chicago Stadium; 18,676 | 19–13 |
| 33 | January 14, 1988; 6:30 p.m. CST | @ Cleveland | L 88–91 (OT) | Jordan (28) | Oakley (17) | Jordan (7) | Richfield Coliseum; 16,648 | 19–14 |
| 34 | January 16, 1988; 7:30 p.m. CST | Detroit | W 115–99 | Jordan (36) | Jordan, Oakley (10) | Jordan (10) | Chicago Stadium; 18,676 | 20–14 |
| 35 | January 18, 1988; 7:30 p.m. CST | Washington | W 117–103 | Jordan (33) | Oakley (10) | Jordan (7) | Chicago Stadium; 17,767 | 21–14 |
| 36 | January 19, 1988; 7:00 p.m. CST | @ Atlanta | L 94–106 | Jordan (38) | Corzine (11) | Threatt (5) | The Omni; 16,451 | 21–15 |
| 37 | January 22, 1988; 7:30 p.m. CST | Phoenix | W 118–108 | | | | Chicago Stadium | 22–15 |
| 38 | January 23, 1988 | Golden State | W 121–94 | | | | Chicago Stadium | 23–15 |
| 39 | January 26, 1988 | @ Indiana | L 93–97 | | | | Market Square Arena | 23–16 |
| 40 | January 27, 1988 | @ Philadelphia | W 119–109 (OT) | | | | The Spectrum | 24–16 |
| 41 | January 29, 1988 | New Jersey | W 120–93 | | | | Chicago Stadium | 25–16 |
| 42 | January 30, 1988 | New York | W 97–95 (OT) | | | | Chicago Stadium | 26–16 |

February: 5–9 (home: 3–3; road: 2–6)

| Game | Date | Team | Score | High points | High rebounds | High assists | Location Attendance | Record |
|---|---|---|---|---|---|---|---|---|
| 43 | February 1, 1988 | @ Sacramento | L 95–97 | | | | ARCO Arena | 26–17 |
| 44 | February 2, 1988; 9:30 p.m. CST | @ L.A. Lakers | L 101–110 | Jordan (39) | Grant (8) | Jordan, Pippen, Threatt (4) | The Forum; 17,505 | 26–18 |
| 45 | February 4, 1988 | @ Phoenix | W 113–101 | | | | Arizona Veterans Memorial Coliseum | 27–18 |
All-Star Break
| 46 | February 9, 1988; 7:30 p.m. CST | Detroit | L 74–89 | Jordan (20) | Oakley (13) | Jordan (9) | Chicago Stadium; 17,846 | 27–19 |
| 47 | February 10, 1988 | @ New Jersey | L 84–93 | | | | Brendan Byrne Arena | 27–20 |
| 48 | February 12, 1988; 8:00 p.m. CST | @ Milwaukee | W 95–93 | Jordan (27) | Oakley (14) | Jordan (8) | MECCA Arena; 11,052 | 28–20 |
| 49 | February 13, 1988; 6:30 p.m. CST | @ Detroit | L 73–82 | Jordan (27) | Oakley (10) | Oakley, Paxson, Sparrow, Threatt (4) | Pontiac Silverdome; 40,369 | 28–21 |
| 50 | February 15, 1988; 12:30 p.m. CST | Atlanta | W 126–107 | Jordan (32) | Jordan (13) | Jordan, Sellers (8) | Chicago Stadium; 17,704 | 29–21 |
| 51 | February 19, 1988 | Sacramento | W 116–101 | | | | Chicago Stadium | 30–21 |
| 52 | February 21, 1988; 12 Noon CST | @ Cleveland | L 111–113 | Jordan (46) | Corzine (9) | Jordan (9) | Richfield Coliseum; 20,089 | 30–22 |
| 53 | February 23, 1988 | Seattle | W 104–97 (OT) | | | | Chicago Stadium | 31–22 |
| 54 | February 26, 1988 | Portland | L 96–104 | | | | Chicago Stadium | 33–21 |
| 55 | February 27, 1988; 7:30 p.m. CST | Milwaukee | L 91–94 | Jordan (38) | Oakley (12) | Vincent (9) | Chicago Stadium; 18,243 | 33–22 |
| 56 | February 29, 1988 | @ Philadelphia | L 101–102 | | | | The Spectrum | 33–23 |

March: 10–4 (home: 7–0; road: 3–4)

| Game | Date | Team | Score | High points | High rebounds | High assists | Location Attendance | Record |
|---|---|---|---|---|---|---|---|---|
| 57 | March 3, 1988 | Philadelphia | W 97–93 | | | | Chicago Stadium | 33–24 |
| 58 | March 5, 1988 | L.A. Clippers | W 100–76 | | | | Chicago Stadium | 34–24 |
| 59 | March 7, 1988 | @ New York | L 98–110 | | | | Madison Square Garden | 34–25 |
| 60 | March 10, 1988; 7:30 p.m. CST | L.A. Lakers | W 128–107 | Jordan (38) | Grant, Oakley (11) | Vincent (11) | Chicago Stadium; 18,676 | 35–25 |
| 61 | March 12, 1988 | San Antonio | W 112–92 | | | | Chicago Stadium | 36–25 |
| 62 | March 15, 1988; 7:00 p.m. CST | Cleveland | W 108–89 | Jordan (38) | Oakley (14) | Vincent (11) | Chicago Stadium; 17,752 | 37–25 |
| 63 | March 16, 1988; 6:30 p.m. CST | @ Washington | L 103–106 | Jordan (25) | Oakley (9) | Vincent (7) | Capital Centre; 16,515 | 37–26 |
| 64 | March 18, 1988; 7:30 p.m. CST | Boston | W 113–103 | Jordan (50) | Oakley (12) | Jordan (9) | Chicago Stadium; 18,676 | 38–26 |
| 65 | March 20, 1988; 12 Noon CST | @ Boston | L 107–137 | Jordan (26) | Oakley (9) | Jordan (7) | Boston Garden; 14,890 | 38–27 |
| 66 | March 23, 1988 | @ Philadelphia | W 118–102 | | | | The Spectrum | 39–27 |
| 67 | March 25, 1988; 6:30 p.m. CST | @ Cleveland | W 111–110 (OT) | Jordan (39) | Oakley (19) | Vincent (8) | Richfield Coliseum; 19,876 | 40–27 |
| 68 | March 26, 1988 | Indiana | W 109–100 | | | | Chicago Stadium | 41–27 |
| 69 | March 29, 1988 | @ Seattle | L 103–106 | | | | Seattle Center Coliseum | 41–28 |
| 70 | March 30, 1988 | @ L.A. Clippers | W 111–94 | | | | Los Angeles Memorial Sports Arena | 41–29 |

April: 9–3 (home: 3–2; road: 6–1)

| Game | Date | Team | Score | High points | High rebounds | High assists | Location Attendance | Record |
|---|---|---|---|---|---|---|---|---|
| 71 | April 1, 1988 | @ Portland | W 116–101 | | | | Memorial Coliseum | 42–29 |
| 72 | April 3, 1988; 12:30 p.m. CDT | @ Detroit | W 112–110 | Jordan (59) | Corzine (12) | Vincent (13) | Pontiac Silverdome; 23,712 | 43–29 |
| 73 | April 5, 1988; 7:30 p.m. CDT | Washington | L 94–105 | Jordan (29) | Oakley (8) | Vincent (9) | Chicago Stadium; 17,773 | 44–29 |
| 74 | April 6, 1988; 7:30 p.m. CDT | @ Milwaukee | W 119–110 | Jordan (37) | Oakley (12) | Jordan (6) | MECCA Arena; 11,052 | 44–30 |
| 75 | April 8, 1988 | New York | W 131–122 | | | | Chicago Stadium | 45–30 |
| 76 | April 14, 1988 | @ Indiana | W 116–110 | | | | Market Square Arena | 46–30 |
| 77 | April 15, 1988 | @ New Jersey | W 100–99 | | | | Brendan Byrne Arena | 47–30 |
| 78 | April 17, 1988; 12:30 p.m. CDT | Milwaukee | W 105–97 | Jordan (44) | Oakley (14) | Vincent (10) | Chicago Stadium; 18,551 | 48–30 |
| 79 | April 19, 1988 | @ New York | W 121–118 | | | | Madison Square Garden | 49–30 |
| 80 | April 21, 1988; 6:30 p.m. CDT | @ Boston | L 119–126 | Jordan (39) | Oakley (17) | Vincent (9) | Boston Garden; 14,890 | 49–31 |
| 81 | April 22, 1988; 7:30 p.m. CDT | Cleveland | L 103–107 | Jordan, Oakley (26) | Oakley (35) | Jordan, Vincent (7) | Chicago Stadium; 17,726 | 49–32 |
| 82 | April 24, 1988; 2:30 p.m. CDT | Boston | W 115–108 | Jordan (46) | Oakley (21) | Jordan, Vincent (6) | Chicago Stadium; 18,636 | 50–32 |

1987–88 schedule

=== Playoffs ===
1988 playoff game log
Eastern Conference First Round: 3–2 (home: 3–0; road: 0–2)

| Game | Date | Team | Score | High points | High rebounds | High assists | Location Attendance | Series |
|---|---|---|---|---|---|---|---|---|
| 1 | April 28, 1988; 7:00 p.m. CDT | Cleveland | W 104–93 | Jordan (50) | Oakley (15) | Paxson (7) | Chicago Stadium; 18,676 | 1–0 |
| 2 | May 1, 1988; 2:30 p.m. CDT | Cleveland | W 106–101 | Jordan (55) | Oakley (12) | Vincent (14) | Chicago Stadium; 18,645 | 2–0 |
| 3 | May 3, 1988; 7:00 p.m. CDT | @ Cleveland | L 102–110 | Jordan (38) | Oakley (9) | Jordan (9) | Richfield Coliseum; 20,068 | 2–1 |
| 4 | May 5, 1988; 7:00 p.m. CDT | @ Cleveland | L 91–97 | Jordan (44) | Oakley (10) | Vincent (5) | Richfield Coliseum; 20,026 | 2–2 |
| 5 | May 8, 1988; 12 Noon CDT | Cleveland | W 107–101 | Jordan (39) | Oakley (20) | Sparrow (7) | Chicago Stadium; 18,008 | 3–2 |

Eastern Conference Semifinals: 1–4 (home: 0–2; road: 1–2)

| Game | Date | Team | Score | High points | High rebounds | High assists | Location Attendance | Series |
|---|---|---|---|---|---|---|---|---|
| 1 | May 10, 1988; 7:30 p.m. CDT | @ Detroit | L 82–93 | Jordan (29) | Oakley (13) | Jordan (6) | Pontiac Silverdome; 18,312 | 0–1 |
| 2 | May 12, 1988; 7:00 p.m. CDT | @ Detroit | W 105–95 | Jordan (36) | Oakley (12) | Pippen, Vincent (5) | Pontiac Silverdome; 20,281 | 1–1 |
| 3 | May 14, 1988; 12 Noon CDT | Detroit | L 79–101 | Jordan (24) | Oakley (12) | Vincent (6) | Chicago Stadium; 18,676 | 1–2 |
| 4 | May 15, 1988; 2:30 p.m. CDT | Detroit | L 77–96 | Jordan (23) | Oakley (10) | Jordan (5) | Chicago Stadium; 18,676 | 1–3 |
| 5 | May 18, 1988; 7:00 p.m. CDT | @ Detroit | L 95–102 | Jordan (25) | Oakley (15) | Jordan, Paxson (8) | Pontiac Silverdome; 21,371 | 1–4 |

1988 schedule

== Player statistics ==
=== Playoffs ===
Charles Oakley 14.3 ppg 15.6 reb 1.3 stl 2.4 blk 2.3 to

== Awards and records ==
- Michael Jordan, NBA Most Valuable Player Award
- Michael Jordan, NBA Defensive Player of the Year Award
- Michael Jordan, NBA All-Star Weekend Slam Dunk Contest Winner
- Michael Jordan, NBA All-Star Game Most Valuable Player Award
- Jerry Krause, NBA Executive of the Year Award
- Michael Jordan, All-NBA First Team
- Michael Jordan, NBA All-Defensive First Team
- Michael Jordan, NBA All-Star Game

== Transactions ==
1st Round, 8th overall Center Olden Polynice was drafted by the Bulls, but traded that same night with draft picks to the Seattle SuperSonics and the rights to the 5th overall pick Forward Scottie Pippen and draft picks.

Forward Horace Grant was drafted in the 1st Round, 10th overall by the Bulls.

== See also ==
- 1987–88 NBA season
