= 1987–88 NBA season =

42nd NBA season

- League: National Basketball Association
- Sport: Basketball
- Duration: November 6, 1987 – April 24, 1988; April 28 – June 4, 1988 (Playoffs); June 7–21, 1988 (Finals)
- Teams: 23
- TV partner(s): CBS, TBS

Draft
- Top draft pick: David Robinson
- Picked by: San Antonio Spurs

Regular season
- Top seed: Los Angeles Lakers
- Season MVP: Michael Jordan (Chicago)
- Top scorer: Michael Jordan (Chicago)

Playoffs
- Eastern champions: Detroit Pistons
- Eastern runners-up: Boston Celtics
- Western champions: Los Angeles Lakers
- Western runners-up: Dallas Mavericks

Finals
- Champions: Los Angeles Lakers
- Runners-up: Detroit Pistons
- Finals MVP: James Worthy (L.A. Lakers)

NBA seasons
- ← 1986–87 1988–89 →

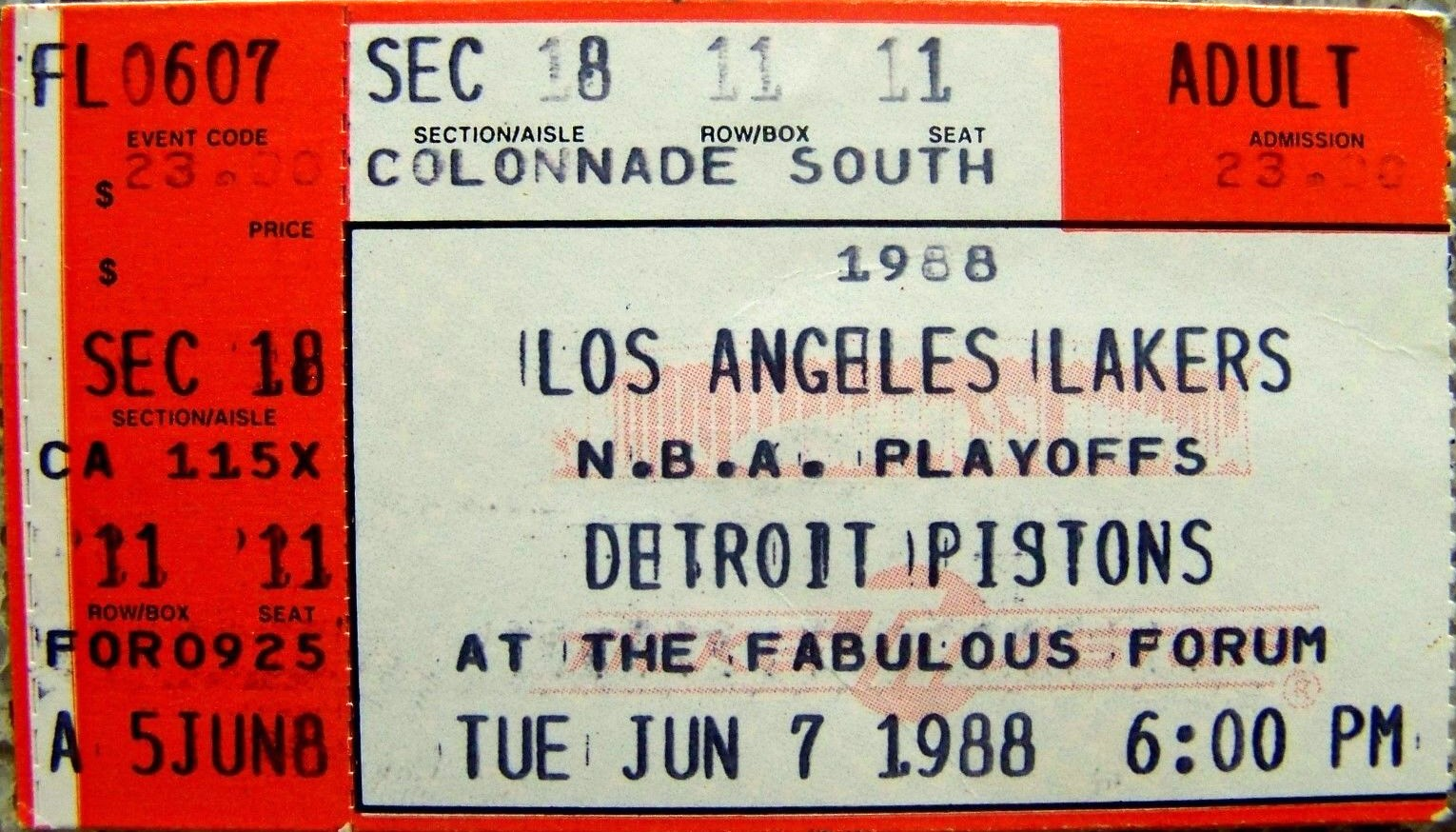
A ticket for game 1 of the 1988 NBA Finals at The Forum.

The 1987–88 NBA season was the 42nd season of the National Basketball Association. The season ended with the Los Angeles Lakers winning their second straight championship, beating the Detroit Pistons in seven hard-fought games in the NBA Finals, becoming the NBA's first repeat champions since the Boston Celtics did it in the 1968–69 NBA season.

== Notable occurrences ==
Coaching changes
Offseason
Team	1986–87 coach	1987–88 coach
Dallas Mavericks	Dick Motta	John MacLeod
Phoenix Suns	Dick Van Arsdale	John Wetzel
Milwaukee Bucks	Don Nelson	Del Harris
New York Knicks	Bob Hill	Rick Pitino
Sacramento Kings	Jerry Reynolds	Bill Russell
Los Angeles Clippers	Don Chaney	Gene Shue
In-season
Team	Outgoing coach	Incoming coach
Golden State Warriors	George Karl	Ed Gregory
Philadelphia 76ers	Matt Guokas	Jim Lynam
New Jersey Nets	Dave Wohl	Bob MacKinnon
New Jersey Nets	Bob MacKinnon	Willis Reed
Sacramento Kings	Bill Russell	Jerry Reynolds
Washington Bullets	Kevin Loughery	Wes Unseld

- The 1988 NBA All-Star Game was played at Chicago Stadium in Chicago, with the East defeating the West 138–133. Local hero Michael Jordan steals the show during the weekend, taking home the game's MVP award, after winning the slam dunk contest earlier in the week over runner-up Dominique Wilkins.
- Michael Jordan becomes the only player in NBA history to win both the scoring title and Defensive Player of the Year honors. He is also the only player in NBA history to combine these awards with the season's Most Valuable Player award.
- Michael Jordan becomes the only player in NBA history to accumulate over 200 steals with over 100 blocks in a season twice, and in a row.
- James Worthy records the first ever Game Seven triple double as he records 36 points, 16 rebounds, and 10 assists.
- The league awards expansion franchises to Charlotte, Miami, Minneapolis, and Orlando. The Charlotte and Miami franchises would debut in the 1988–89 NBA season, while Minneapolis and Orlando would begin play in the 1989–90 NBA season.
- The New Jersey Nets had 3 different head coaches during the season, a rare occurrence. The Indiana Pacers had four different head coaches during the following season.
- The San Antonio Spurs are the last team in NBA history to lose 50 or more games in a season, and still make the playoffs. Although they drafted center David Robinson with the No. 1 overall pick the previous year, he does not join the team until the 1989–90 season, due to a two-year commitment to the United States Navy.
- With the exception of their first-round sweep of San Antonio, the Los Angeles Lakers played seven-game series the rest of the way. During the run, they overcame the Utah Jazz in the semifinals, the Dallas Mavericks in the conference finals, and the Detroit Pistons in the NBA Finals. The Mavs' appearance in the conference finals was the team's first, but it would not make the conference finals again until 2003, fifteen years later. Dallas would also make it at least as far as the conference finals in 2006, 2011, 2022, and 2024.
- This was the first time that the season extended until the 21st of June, which meant that the entire NBA season covered all four seasons of the year, beginning with autumn in November during the regular season and lasting all the way to Game 7 of the Finals which was played on the first official day of summer.
- On January 5, 1988, Hall of Famer Pete Maravich died of a heart attack during a pickup game. He was 40 years old. The Utah Jazz subsequently honored him by sporting a patch containing his jersey No. 7.
- The Phoenix Suns mourned the loss of center Nick Vanos, killed in an airline crash on August 16, 1987. The Suns sported black circular patches with his jersey No. 30 on their uniforms for the season.
- The Detroit Pistons play their final season at Pontiac Silverdome.
- The Milwaukee Bucks play their final season at MECCA (Milwaukee Arena).
- The Sacramento Kings play their final season at ARCO Arena I.
- The Washington Bullets played the 1987–88 season with two players on opposite sides of the NBA height record: 7'7" Manute Bol, then the league's tallest player (tied with another former Bullet, Gheorghe Mureșan) and 5'3" Muggsy Bogues, the league's shortest player.
- CBS begins broadcasting the NBA games in stereo.
- Larry Bird becomes the first player in NBA history to enter the 50–40–90 club more than once, and in consecutive seasons.

== 1987–88 NBA changes ==
- The Cleveland Cavaliers changed their road uniform from orange to dark blue color.
- The Washington Bullets changed their logo and uniforms.

== Final standings ==
=== By division ===
Atlantic Division	W	L	PCT	GB	Home	Road	Div
y-Boston Celtics	57	25	.695	–	36–5	21–20	19–5
x-Washington Bullets	38	44	.463	19	25–16	13–28	13–11
x-New York Knicks	38	44	.463	19	29–12	9–32	10–14
Philadelphia 76ers	36	46	.439	21	27–14	9–32	12–12
New Jersey Nets	19	63	.232	38	16–25	3–38	6–18

Central Division	W	L	PCT	GB	Home	Road	Div
y-Detroit Pistons	54	28	.659	–	34–7	20–21	20–10
x-Chicago Bulls	50	32	.610	4	30–11	20–21	16–13
x-Atlanta Hawks	50	32	.610	4	30-11	20-21	16–13
x-Milwaukee Bucks	42	40	.512	12	30–11	12–29	13–17
x-Cleveland Cavaliers	42	40	.512	12	31–10	11–30	11–19
Indiana Pacers	38	44	.463	16	25–16	13–28	13–17

Midwest Division	W	L	PCT	GB	Home	Road	Div
y-Denver Nuggets	54	28	.659	–	35–6	19–22	18–12
x-Dallas Mavericks	53	29	.646	1	33–8	20–21	20–10
x-Utah Jazz	47	35	.573	7	33–8	14–27	18–12
x-Houston Rockets	46	36	.561	8	31–10	15–26	13–17
x-San Antonio Spurs	31	51	.378	23	23–18	8–33	12–18
Sacramento Kings	24	58	.293	30	19–22	5–36	9–21

Pacific Division	W	L	PCT	GB	Home	Road	Div
y-Los Angeles Lakers	62	20	.756	–	36–5	26–15	23–7
x-Portland Trail Blazers	53	29	.646	9	33–8	20–21	23–7
x-Seattle SuperSonics	44	38	.537	18	32–9	12–29	19–11
Phoenix Suns	28	54	.341	34	22–19	6–35	11–19
Golden State Warriors	20	62	.244	42	16–25	4–37	7–23
Los Angeles Clippers	17	65	.207	45	14–27	3–38	7–23

=== By conference ===
#	Eastern Conference				
#	Team	W	L	PCT	GB
1	c-Boston Celtics	57	25	.695	–
2	y-Detroit Pistons	54	28	.659	3
3	x-Chicago Bulls	50	32	.610	7
4	x-Atlanta Hawks	50	32	.610	7
5	x-Milwaukee Bucks	42	40	.512	15
6	x-Cleveland Cavaliers	42	40	.512	15
7	x-Washington Bullets	38	44	.463	19
8	x-New York Knicks	38	44	.463	19
9	Indiana Pacers	38	44	.463	19
10	Philadelphia 76ers	36	46	.439	21
11	New Jersey Nets	19	63	.232	38

#	Western Conference				
#	Team	W	L	PCT	GB
1	z-Los Angeles Lakers	62	20	.756	–
2	y-Denver Nuggets	54	28	.659	8
3	x-Dallas Mavericks	53	29	.646	9
4	x-Portland Trail Blazers	53	29	.646	9
5	x-Utah Jazz	47	35	.573	15
6	x-Houston Rockets	46	36	.561	16
7	x-Seattle SuperSonics	44	38	.537	18
8	x-San Antonio Spurs	31	51	.378	31
9	Phoenix Suns	28	54	.341	34
10	Sacramento Kings	24	58	.293	38
11	Golden State Warriors	20	62	.244	42
12	Los Angeles Clippers	17	65	.207	45

Notes

- z – Clinched home court advantage for the entire playoffs
- c – Clinched home court advantage for the conference playoffs
- y – Clinched division title
- x – Clinched playoff spot

== Playoffs ==
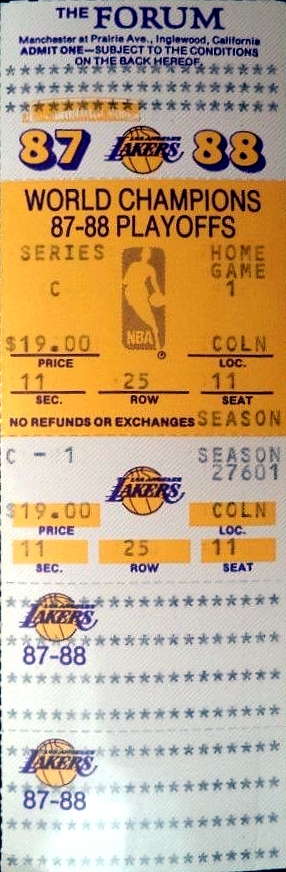
A ticket for Game 1 of the 1988 Western Conference Finals between the Los Angeles Lakers and the Dallas Mavericks.

Teams in bold advanced to the next round. The numbers to the left of each team indicate the team's seeding in its conference, and the numbers to the right indicate the number of games the team won in that round. The division champions are marked by an asterisk. Home court advantage does not necessarily belong to the higher-seeded team, but instead the team with the better regular season record; teams enjoying the home advantage are shown in italics.

First Round	Conference Semifinals
**E1**	**Boston***	**3**
E8	New York	1
**E1**	**Boston***	**4**
E4	Atlanta	3
**E4**	**Atlanta**	**3**
E5	Milwaukee	2
**Eastern Conference**
**E3**	**Chicago**	**3**
E6	Cleveland	2
E3	Chicago	1
**E2**	**Detroit***	**4**
**E2**	**Detroit***	**3**
E7	Washington	2
**W1**	**LA Lakers***	**3**
W8	San Antonio	0
**W1**	**LA Lakers***	**4**
W5	Utah	3
W4	Portland	1
**W5**	**Utah**	**3**
**Western Conference**
**W3**	**Dallas**	**3**
W6	Houston	1
**W3**	**Dallas**	**4**
W2	Denver*	2
**W2**	**Denver***	**3**
W7	Seattle	2

Conference Finals
E1	Boston*	2
**E2**	**Detroit***	**4**
**W1**	**LA Lakers***	**4**
W3	Dallas	3

NBA Finals
E2	Detroit*	3
**W1**	**LA Lakers***	**4**

- * Division winner
- **Bold** Series winner
- Italic Team with home-court advantage

== Statistics leaders ==
Category	Player	Team	Stat
Points per game	Michael Jordan	Chicago Bulls	35.0
Rebounds per game	Michael Cage	Los Angeles Clippers	13.0
Assists per game	John Stockton	Utah Jazz	13.8
Steals per game	Michael Jordan	Chicago Bulls	3.16
Blocks per game	Mark Eaton	Utah Jazz	3.71
FG%	Kevin McHale	Boston Celtics	.604
FT%	Jack Sikma	Milwaukee Bucks	.922
3FG%	Craig Hodges	Milwaukee Bucks	.492

== NBA awards ==
=== Yearly awards ===
- Most Valuable Player: Michael Jordan, Chicago Bulls
- Rookie of the Year: Mark Jackson, New York Knicks
- Defensive Player of the Year: Michael Jordan, Chicago Bulls
- Sixth Man of the Year: Roy Tarpley, Dallas Mavericks
- Most Improved Player: Kevin Duckworth, Portland Trail Blazers
- Coach of the Year: Doug Moe, Denver Nuggets

- All-NBA First Team:
  - F – Larry Bird, Boston Celtics
  - F – Charles Barkley, Philadelphia 76ers
  - C – Akeem Olajuwon, Houston Rockets
  - G – Michael Jordan, Chicago Bulls
  - G – Magic Johnson, Los Angeles Lakers
- All-NBA Second Team:
  - F – Karl Malone, Utah Jazz
  - F – Dominique Wilkins, Atlanta Hawks
  - C – Patrick Ewing, New York Knicks
  - G – Clyde Drexler, Portland Trail Blazers
  - G – John Stockton, Utah Jazz

- All-NBA Rookie Team:
  - Derrick McKey, Seattle SuperSonics
  - Cadillac Anderson, San Antonio Spurs
  - Mark Jackson, New York Knicks
  - Kenny Smith, Sacramento Kings
  - Armen Gilliam, Phoenix Suns

- NBA All-Defensive First Team:
  - Kevin McHale, Boston Celtics
  - Rodney McCray, Houston Rockets
  - Akeem Olajuwon, Houston Rockets
  - Michael Cooper, Los Angeles Lakers
  - Michael Jordan, Chicago Bulls
- NBA All-Defensive Second Team:
  - Buck Williams, New Jersey Nets
  - Karl Malone, Utah Jazz
  - Mark Eaton, Utah Jazz (tie)
  - Patrick Ewing, New York Knicks (tie)
  - Alvin Robertson, San Antonio Spurs
  - Lafayette Lever, Denver Nuggets

=== Player of the week ===
The following players were named NBA Player of the Week.

Week	Player
Nov. 6 – Nov. 15	Larry Bird (Boston Celtics)
Nov. 16 – Nov. 22	Xavier McDaniel (Seattle SuperSonics)
Nov. 23 – Nov. 29	Clyde Drexler (Portland Trail Blazers)
Nov. 30 – Dec. 6	Clyde Drexler (Portland Trail Blazers)
Dec. 7 – Dec. 13	Magic Johnson (Los Angeles Lakers)
Dec. 14 – Dec. 20	Larry Nance (Phoenix Suns)
Dec. 21 – Dec. 27	Dominique Wilkins (Atlanta Hawks)
Dec. 28 – Jan. 3	Karl Malone (Utah Jazz)
Jan. 4 – Jan. 10	Byron Scott (Los Angeles Lakers)
Jan. 11 – Jan. 17	Dominique Wilkins (Atlanta Hawks)
Jan. 18 – Jan. 24	Michael Jordan (Chicago Bulls)
Jan. 25 – Jan. 31	Bernard King (Washington Bullets)
Feb. 1 – Feb. 14	Dominique Wilkins (Atlanta Hawks)
Feb. 15 – Feb. 21	John Stockton (Utah Jazz)
Feb. 22 – Feb. 28	Roy Tarpley (Dallas Mavericks)
Feb. 29 – Mar. 6	Bobby Hansen (Utah Jazz)
Feb. 7 – Mar. 13	Clyde Drexler (Portland Trail Blazers)
Mar. 14 – Mar. 20	Charles Barkley (Philadelphia 76ers)
Mar. 21 – Mar. 27	Michael Jordan (Chicago Bulls)
Mar. 28 – Apr. 3	Michael Jordan (Chicago Bulls)
Apr. 4 – Apr. 10	Harold Pressley (Sacramento Kings)
Apr. 11 – Apr. 17	Lafayette Lever (Denver Nuggets)
Apr. 18 – Apr. 24	Karl Malone (Utah Jazz)

=== Player of the month ===
The following players were named NBA Player of the Month.

Month	Player
November	Michael Jordan (Chicago Bulls)
December	Larry Nance (Phoenix Suns)
January	Michael Jordan (Chicago Bulls)
February	John Stockton (Utah Jazz)
March	Karl Malone (Utah Jazz)
April	Lafayette Lever (Denver Nuggets)

=== Rookie of the month ===
The following players were named NBA Rookie of the Month.

Month	Rookie
November	Mark Jackson (New York Knicks)
December	Mark Jackson (New York Knicks)
January	Armon Gilliam (Phoenix Suns)
February	Mark Jackson (New York Knicks)
March	Greg Anderson (San Antonio Spurs)
April	Kevin Johnson (Phoenix Suns)

=== Coach of the month ===
The following coaches were named NBA Coach of the Month.

Month	Coach
November	Doug Collins (Chicago Bulls)
December	Chuck Daly (Detroit Pistons)
January	Wes Unseld (Washington Bullets)
February	Pat Riley (Los Angeles Lakers)
March	Doug Moe (Denver Nuggets)
April	Lenny Wilkens (Cleveland Cavaliers)

== See also ==
- List of NBA regular season records
